= Aria (disambiguation) =

An aria is a self-contained expressive melody for one voice usually with orchestral accompaniment.

Aria may also refer to:

== Music ==
=== Artists ===
- Aria (band), a Russian heavy-metal band
- Aria (Indian singer) (born 2003), Indian singer based in South Korea

=== Albums ===
- Aria: The Opera Album, 1998 album by Andrea Bocelli
- Aria (Alan Sorrenti album), 1972
- Aria (Asia album), 1994
- Aria (Gianna Nannini album), 2002
- Aria (Grover Washington Jr. album), 2000

=== Songs ===
- "Aria" (song), by Dario Baldan Bembo
- "Aria", a song by Delerium featuring the Mediæval Bæbes
- "Aria", a song by Kalafina
- "Aria", a song by Yanni from Dare to Dream
- "Aria", a song by Hamasaki Ayumi from Love Songs
- "Aria", a song by Susumu Hirasawa
- "Aria", a song by Oh Hiroshima from In Silence We Yearn

== Comics and manga ==
- Aria (Belgian comic), a fantasy by Michel Weyland that debuted in 1982
- Aria (Image Comics), an American urban fantasy by Brian Holguin and Jay Anacleto, published from 1999 to 2003 by Image Comics
- Aria (manga), a Japanese manga and anime created by Kozue Amano, that debuted in 2001
- Aria (magazine), a Japanese manga magazine published by Kodansha from 2010 to 2018
- Aria the Scarlet Ammo, a Japanese light novel, manga, and anime series created by Chūgaku Akamatsu, that debuted in 2008

== Film and television ==
- Aria (1987 film), an anthology film made by ten directors
- Aria (2001 film), an animated short film
- "Aria" (Law & Order), an episode of the TV series

== People ==
- Aria (name), a given name
- Aria (singer), American recording artist, songwriter, and actress

== Places ==
- Aria (Crete), a town of ancient Crete
- Aria (region), a historical region in northwest Afghanistan
- Aria, Argolis, a settlement in the municipality Nafplio, Greece
- Aria, Navarre, a municipality in the autonomous community of Navarre, Spain
- Āria, a locality in the Waitomo District of New Zealand
- Aria Resort and Casino, an American hotel on the Las Vegas Strip, Nevada

== Science and technology ==
- Aria (storage engine), a storage engine for MySQL and MariaDB
- HTC Aria, a phone by HTC Corporation
- Aria 16, line of sound cards by Prometheus Products
- Acetylcholine receptor inducing activity, an alternative name for neuregulin type 1
- Amyloid-related imaging abnormalities, a side effect of monoclonal antibody therapies for Alzheimer's disease
- WAI-ARIA (Web Accessibility Initiative – Accessible Rich Internet Applications (WAI-ARIA), a set of guidelines for accessible web applications
- Advanced Research and Invention Agency, a UK research funding agency
- An AI assistant integrated into the Opera web browser
- Aria (plant), a genus of plants in the family Rosaceae

== Transport ==
- Aria (French airline), an airline based in Mulhouse, France
- Aria Air, an airline based in Tehran, Iran
- Aria FXE, an automobile produced by Aria group
- Aeroflot Russian International Airlines, a Russian airline
- Tata Aria, an automobile
- Lady Anastasia, formerly Aria, a superyacht, a luxury motor yacht launched in 2001
- Saipa Aria, an Iranian compact crossover SUV

== Fictional characters ==
- Aria Montgomery, a character from the TV and book series Pretty Little Liars
- Aria, a character from the Japanese media franchise Sister Princess
- Aria, a character from the Japanese anime Saint Seiya Omega
- Aria, a character from the Crypt of the Necrodancer video game
- Aria Pokoteng, the cat title character from the Aria manga
- Aria T'Loak, a character from the Mass Effect series of video games
- Aria Blaze, a character from the animated film Equestria Girls: Rainbow Rocks
- Aria Shichijou, fictional character in the Seitokai Yakuindomo manga series

== Other uses ==
- Aria (guitar company), a manufacturer of guitars
- Aria (month), the seventh month of the Mandaean calendar
- Areia (mythology)
- Aria: Canticle of the Monomyth, a tabletop role-playing game by Last Unicorn Games

== See also ==
- ARIA (disambiguation)
- Arias (disambiguation)
- Ariya (disambiguation)
- Arya (disambiguation)
  - Arya (name)
- Arria (disambiguation)
