= Arian (disambiguation) =

Arian may refer to:

== Pertaining to Arius ==
- A follower of Arius, a Christian presbyter in the 3rd and 4th century
- Arianism, a nontrinitarian Christological doctrine.
- Arian controversy, several controversies which divided the early Christian church
- Arian fragment, Arian palimpsest

== People ==
=== Groups of people ===
- Arians or Areians, ancient people living in Ariana (origin of the modern name Iran)
  - Aryan, a term associated with the Proto-Indo-Iranians
  - Aryan race, a racial concept
- An inhabitant of Aria (today's Herat, Afghanistan), used by the ancient and medieval Greeks (as Ἄρ(ε)ιοι/Ar(e)ioi) and Romans (as Arii)

=== Given name ===
- Arian Asllani (born 1983), American rapper known as Action Bronson
- Arian Bimo (born 1959), Albanian footballer
- Arian Çuliqi, Albanian television director and screenwriter
- Arian Foster (born 1986), American football player
- Arian Hametaj (born 1957), Albanian footballer
- Arián Iznaga, Cuban Paralympian sprinter
- Arian Kabashi (born 1996), Kosovan footballer
- Arian Kabashi (born 1997), Swedish footballer
- Arlan Lerio (born 1976), Filipino boxer
- Arian Leviste (born 1970), American electronic music artist, producer, and DJ
- Arian Moayed (born 1980), Iranian-born American actor and theater producer
- Arian Moreno (born 2003), Venezuelan footballer
- Arian Nik (born 1994), British actor
- Arian Smith (born 2001), American football player

=== Surname ===
Arian is a surname that originated in Ancient Persia

- Arman Arian (born 1981), Iranian author, novelist and researcher
- Asher Arian (1938–2010), American political scientist
- Asma Arian, German-Qatari human rights activist
- Laila Al-Arian (born 1980s), American broadcast journalist
- Sami Al-Arian (born 1958), Palestinian-American civil rights activist
- Praskovia Arian (1864–1949) Russian and Soviet writer and feminist
- Bruce Arians (born 1952), American football coach and former player
- Jake Arians (born 1978), American football player

== Other ==
- Arian (band), a pop band in Iran
- Arian (newspaper), an Iranian newspaper since 1914
- Arian, an outsider's name for a member of the Polish Brethren
- Arian, a person born under the constellation Aries (astrology)

== See also ==
- Arian Kartli, ancient Georgian country
- Al-Arian, an Arab village in northern Israel
- Aaryan, a given name and surname
- Ariane (disambiguation), the French spelling of Ariadne, a character in Greek mythology
- Ariann Black, Canadian-American female magician
- Ariano (disambiguation)
- Arien (disambiguation)
- Arius (disambiguation)
- Ariyan A. Johnson
- Arrian, Greek historian
- Aryan (name)
- Ghamar Ariyan
