= Aryan (name) =

- Pronunciation: Ar-yun
- Gender: Male

Origin
- Origin: Avestan, Old Persian, Sanskrit
- Meaning: Noble, honorable
- Region of origin: Ancient India, Ancient Iran

Aryan also spelled Ariyan, Arian, Aryann or Aaryan is a given name and surname that is popular in India and Iran. The name Aryan is derived from the Sanskrit (ārya) meaning "noble and educated" in the context of Indian religions Hinduism, Buddhism and Jainism while it is from Old Persian (aryaʰ) ("noble and honorable") in the context of Iran.

In the Anglosphere, the name has generally negative connotations, due to the Nazi racial theories about the superiority of the so-called Aryan race (and related usage of the term by white supremacist organizations such as Aryan Nations).

== People with the given name ==
- Ariyan Arslani (born 1983), American rapper known as Action Bronson
- Aryann Bhowmik (born 1992), Indian actor
- Aryan Bora (born 2000), Indian cricketer
- Aryan Chopra (born 2001), Indian chess grandmaster
- Arian Çuliqi (born 1960), Albanian television director and screenwriter
- Aaryan Dinesh Kanagaratnam (born 1981), Sri Lankan music entertainer
- Aryan Dutt (born 2003), Dutch cricketer
- Arian Foster (born 1986), American football player
- Aryan Gholami (born 2001), Iranian chess grandmaster
- Arian Hametaj (born 1957), Albanian footballer
- Arián Iznaga (born 1978), Cuban Paralympian sprinter
- Aryan Jain (born 1997), Australian cricketer
- Aryan Juyal (born 2001), Indian cricketer
- Arian Kabashi (born 1996), Kosovan footballer
- Arian Kabashi (born 1997), Swedish footballer
- Aryan Kaganof (born 1964), South African film maker, novelist, poet and fine artist
- Aryan Khan, (born 1997) Indian entrepreneur and filmmaker
- Aaryan Krishna Menon (born 1986), Indian actor, screenwriter and director
- Aryan Lakra (born 2001), Indian-born cricketer who plays for the United Arab Emirates national cricket team
- Arian Leviste (born 1970), American electronic music artist, producer, and DJ
- Arian Moayed (born 1980), Iranian-born American actor and theater producer
- Aryan Niraj Lamba (born 2002), Indian professional footballer
- Aryan Pandit (born 1990), Indian actor and model
- Aryan Prajapati (born 2008), Indian child actor
- Aryan Rajesh (born 1980), Indian film actor
- Aryann Roy, Indian actor
- Arian Salimi (born 2003), Iranian taekwondo olympics medalist
- Aaryan Sigdel (born 1981), Nepalese film actor
- Aryan Tajbakhsh (born 1990), English professional footballer
- Aryan Tari (born 1999), Norwegian chess grandmaster
- Aryan Tsiutryn (1994), Russian and Belarusian freestyle wrestler
- Aryan Vaid (born 1976), Indian model

== People with the surname ==
- A. V. Aryan (1924–2007), Indian politician
- Abdul Rashid Arian (born 1941), Afghan politician
- Arman Arian (born 1981), Iranian author, novelist and researcher
- Asher Arian (1938–2010), American political scientist
- Bruce Arians (born 1952), American football coach and former player
- Ghamar Ariyan (1922–2012), Iranian researcher and author
- Jake Arians (born 1978), American football player
- K. C. Aryan (1919–2002), Indian contemporary artist, art historian and collector
- Kartik Aaryan (born 1990), Indian actor
- Khadijeh Aryan (born 1954), Iranian scholar
- Marc Aryan (1926–1985), French-Belgian entertainer
- Mizanur Rahman Aryan (born 1991), Bangladeshi scriptwriter
- Pan Parag Ravi Aryan (born 1985), Indian actor
- Praskovia Arian (1864–1949), Russian and Soviet writer and feminist
- Shabana Shajahan Aryan (1997), Indian actress

== Fictional characters ==
- Aryan Singh, fictional criminal featured in the 2006 Indian film Dhoom 2, played by Hritik Roshan

== See also ==
- Arya (name)
- Ariana (name)
- Aryan (disambiguation)
- Arian (disambiguation)
- Alan (given name)
