= Aryan (disambiguation) =

Aryan, or Arya, was a self-designation by Indo-Iranian people.

Aryan or Arya may also refer to:

== Ethnography and linguistics ==
- Indo-Iranians, or Ā́rya or Aryans a prehistoric people who spoke Proto-Indo-Iranian language
  - Indo-Aryan peoples, people speaking the Indo-Aryan languages
    - List of ancient Indo-Aryan peoples and tribes
  - Iranian peoples, people speaking the Iranian languages
    - List of ancient Iranian peoples
  - Arya (Iran), self-designation of early Iranians from Greater Iran
    - Self-designation of the Alans, a group of Iranic nomads from the Eurasian steppe who formed the Alania kingdom
    - Self-designation of the Iranians in the Avesta
    - Self-designation of the Iranians in the Achaemenid Empire
    - People from Ariana, corresponding to Khorasan during the medieval period
    - Inhabitants of the Sasanian Empire
- Proto-Indo-Europeans (obsolete usage)
- Aryan race, a pseudoscientific historical race concept from the late-19th century associated with Nazism and Nordicism
  - Aryanism, an ideology of racial supremacy
  - Nordic race, an obsolete racial classification
- Aryan languages (disambiguation)
- Aryan religion (disambiguation)

== People ==
- Arya (name), including a list of people and fictional characters with the name
  - Arya (actor) (born 1980), south Indian actor
  - Arya (actress), Indian actress
- Aryan (name), including a list of people and fictional characters with the name

== Businesses and organizations ==
- Aryan Cargo Express, a cargo airline based in India
- Aryans College of Law, in Punjab, India
- The Aryan School, in Dehradun, India

== Film ==
- The Aryan, a 1916 American silent film
- Aryan (1988 film), an Indian Malayalam film
- Arya (2004 film), an Indian Telugu film
  - Arya 2, 2009
- Aryan (2006 film), an Indian Hindi film
- Aarya (film), a 2007 Indian Tamil film
- Aryan (2014 film), an Indian Kannada film
- Maharakshak: Aryan, a 2014 Indian TV show
- Aarya (TV series), a 2020 Indian Hindi TV series

== Places ==
- Aryan, Afghanistan
- Aryan, Kurdistan, Iran
- Aryan, Razavi Khorasan, Iran
- Varian, Iran, a village in Alborz Province, Iran
- Arya (urban-type settlement), Nizhny Novgorod Oblast, Russia
- Aryan Valley, a region in Ladakh, India

== Other uses ==
- Arya (Buddhism), a term with several uses
- Arya: A Philosophical Review, a monthly periodical in India 1914–1921
- Arya metre, a poetic metre used in Sanskrit and Prakrit verse
- Aryan FC, a football club in Kolkata, West Bengal, India
- Arya F.C., a football club in Mashhad, Iran
- Arya, a chatbot operated by the alt-tech social networking site Gab
- The Aryan, a newspaper briefly published by Sunder Singh

== See also ==
- Ari (name)
- Aria (region), centered on the city of Herat
- Ariane (rocket family), a series of space vehicles
- Arrian (86 A.D. – 2nd century A.D.), Greek historian
- Arya Vaisya (disambiguation), several castes
- Araya (disambiguation)
- Aria (disambiguation)
- Arian (disambiguation)
- Ariana (disambiguation)
- Ariya (disambiguation)
- Aryn (disambiguation)
- Ayran, a yoghurt-based drink
