= Aria (name) =

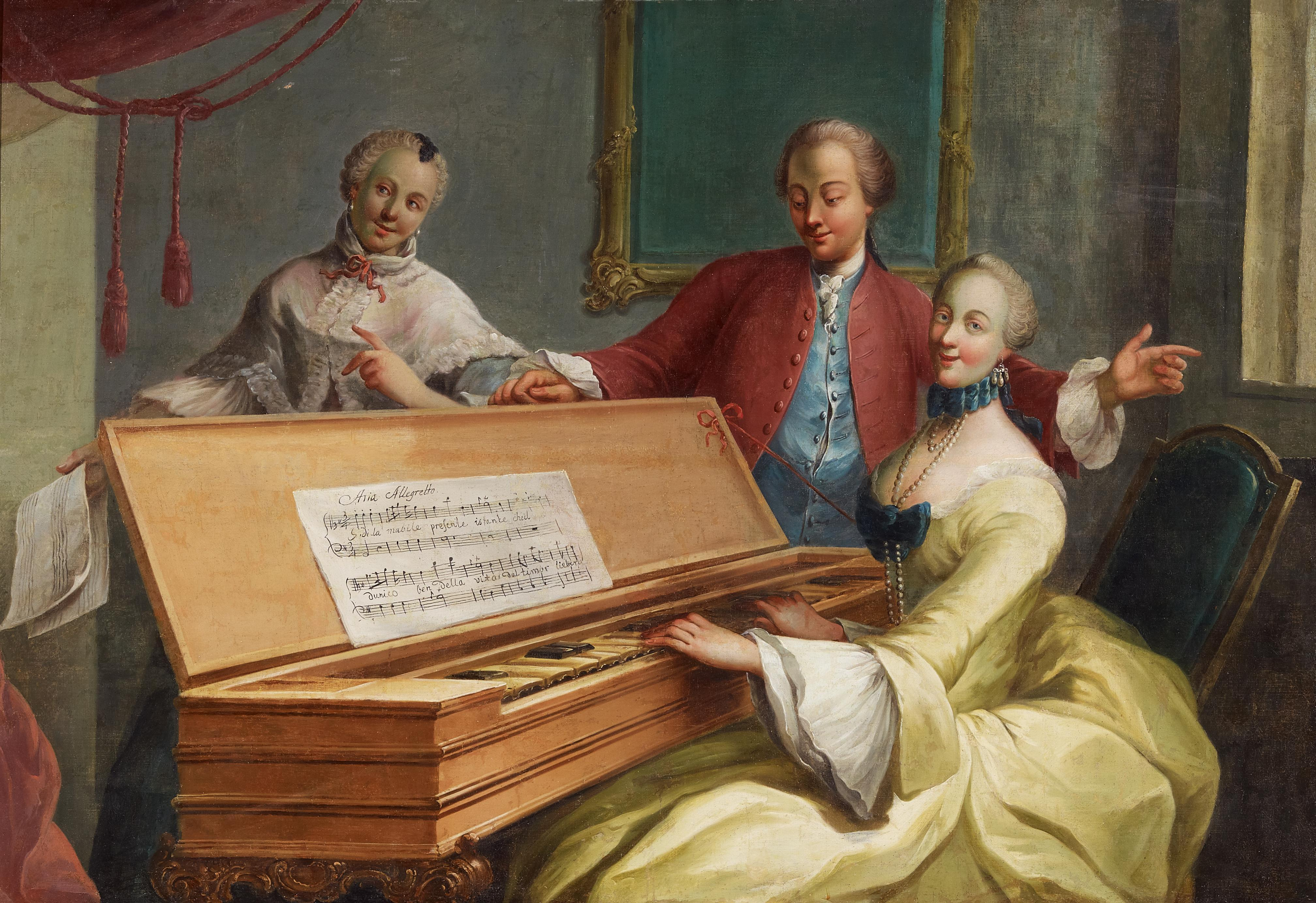
- Aria Allegretto by an anonymous artist.
- Gender: Male and female

Origin
- Origin: Arabic, Indian, Italian, Albanian, Persian, Aramaic, Hebrew

Other names
- See also: Arya, Ari

Aria can be a male, female, or even a unisex name depending on the country of origin. The Persian Arya (Persian: آریا) is a male name that means "noble". Italian Aria refers both "air" and the melody, aria. In the Albanian language, Aria or Ari means "treasure" or "gold" or "of high value". In Hebrew, (Hebrew: אריה, romanized: Arye), the name means "lion", while the alternate Ariyah (Hebrew: ארייה) means "God's (-Yah) Lion (Arye)". The Hebrew meaning is also carried over to Neo-Aramaic dialects (Syriac: ܐܪܝܐ).

The term Arya has been used by the Iranian people, as well as by the rulers and emperors of Iran, from the time of the Avesta. Evidently from the time of the Sassanids (226–651 CE) Iranians have called it Iran, meaning the "Land of the Aryans" and Iranshahr. In Middle Persian sources, the name Arya and Iran is used for the pre-Sassanid Iranian empires as well as the Sassanid empire. As an example, the use of the name "Iran" for Achaemenids in the Middle Persian book of Arda Viraf. The Proto-Iranian term for Iran is reconstructed as *Aryānām (the genitive plural of the word *Arya); the Avestan equivalent is Airyanem (as in Airyanem Vaejah).

== People with the given name ==
- Aria Aber (born 1991), German-American poet and writer
- Aria Barzan (Ariobarzanes of Persis, died 330 BC; known as Ariobarzane the Brave), Iranian prince, satrap, and military commander
- Aria Das, Indian Buddhist nun and model
- Aria Barzegar (born 2002), Iranian professional footballer
- Aria Bedmar (born 1994), Spanish actress and dancer
- Aria Bolkus (born 1996/1997), Australian politician for the Labor Party
- Aria Clemente (born 1995), Filipina singer and actress
- Aria Crescendo, French-Romanian singer, songwriter and member of the Paradiso Girls
- Aria Curzon (born 1987), American actress
- Aria de Vries-Noordam (c. 1972–), Dutch Paralympic athlete
- Aria Dean (born 1993), American critic, artist, and curator
- Aria Dinata (born 2003), Croatian badminton player
- Aria Finger, former CEO of DoSomething and President of the TMI agency
- Aria Fischer (born 1999), American water polo player
- Aria Giovanni (born 1977), American pornographic actress and model
- Aria Hasegawa (born 1988), Japanese former professional footballer
- Aria C Jalali! (born 1987), San Francisco-based singer
- Aria Johnson (born 1983), American singer and actress
- Aria Maria Vittoria Rossa Argento (born 1975), Italian actress and filmmaker
- Aria Mia Loberti (born 1994), American actress
- Aria Nasimi Shad (born 1995), Iranian swimmer
- Aria Sa'id (born 1989/1990), American transgender advocate and political strategist
- Aria Tesolin (born 1993), Canadian singer
- Aria Wallace (born 1996), American actress
- Aria Wiraraja (died 1331), Asian warrior and monarch

=== Fictional characters ===
- Aria Montgomery, a character from the TV series Pretty Little Liars
- President Aria Pokoteng, from Aria
- Aria Blaze, a character in the My Little Pony films
- Aria Kanzaki, in the Aria the Scarlet Ammo series of novels
- Aria Shichijou, in the Seitokai Yakuindomo manga series
- Aria, in the video game Crypt of the Necrodancer
- Aria Benett, in the video game Final Fantasy III
- Aria, in the Guilty Gear series of fighting games
- Aria T'Loak, from the Mass Effect series of video games
- Aria Wallenstein, from the Sword Oratoria series of light novels
- Aria Link, from the anime Tegami Bachi
- Aria, one of the moon sisters from the game Genshin Impact
- Aria, of the "Angels of Delusion" faction from the video game Zenless Zone Zero
- Aria Elwyn, from the Webcomic Oceanfalls

== People with the surname ==
- Alphonse Aria (1902–1968), French sport wrestler
- Amir-Mansour Aria (1969–2014), Iranian businessman
- Ismaray Marrero Aria (born 1982), Cuban rower
- Kaminieli Aria (died 1967), Fijian cricketer
- Mojean Aria (born 1993), Australian actor
- Nikita Aria, Indian actress
- Savenaca Aria (1964–2020), Fijian rugby union footballer

== See also ==
- Tata Aria, a car made by Tata Motors of India
- Aria (region)
- Arias (surname)
- Arya (name)
