= Arien =

Arien, Ariën, Ariens, Ariëns or Arienne may refer to the following

== Given name ==
- Ariën Pietersma (born 1987), Dutch football
- Ariën van Weesenbeek (born 1980), Dutch drummer
- Arienne Dwyer, American professor

== Other People ==
- Jan Ariens Duif (c. 1617 – 1649), Dutch painter

== Other ==
- Al-Arien, Syrian village
- "Arienne", 1993 Tasmin Archer song
- Ariens, American manufacturer of snow blowers, lawn tractors and zero-turn lawn mowers
- Ariëns Kappers Medal, scientific honor

== See also ==
- Arian (disambiguation)
- Aryan (name)
- Aaryan
