= Ariyalur (disambiguation) =

Ariyalur is a town and district headquarters in Tamil Nadu, India.

Ariyalur may also refer to:

Related to the town

- Ariyalur district
  - Ariyalur Block
  - Ariyalur division
  - Ariyalur taluk
  - Ariyalur (State Assembly Constituency)
  - Ariyalur Group, a geological group in Tamil Nadu
- Ariyalur railway station

Others

- Ariyalur (North), a village in Tamil Nadu, India
- Ariyalur Anitha, see Suicide of S. Anitha

== See also ==
- Ariya (disambiguation)
