= Arya Vaisya =

Arya Vaisya may refer to:

- Arya Vaishya or Komati, a trading caste from Central and Southern India
- Moothan, a caste of traders in Kerala, India who worship Kannika as Parameshwari

== See also ==
- Arya (disambiguation)
- Vaishya, a class of Indian castes (merchants)
