= Now That I Know =

Now That I Know

- "Now That I Know", Aria Tesolin
- "Now That I Know", Shannon McNally 2002
- "Now That I Know", Ashley Monroe
- "Now That I Know", SremmLife 2
- "Now That I Know", Music Box (Mariah Carey album)
