= Arias (disambiguation) =

Arias are musical pieces for a single voice as part of a larger work.

Arias, Árias or ARIAS may also refer to:

- Arias (moth)
- Arias (surname)
- Arias, Argentina
- ARIA Awards (the ARIAs), annual Australian music industry awards
- Audio and Radio Industry Awards (the ARIAS), British radio and audio awards

== See also ==
- Aria (disambiguation)
- ARIA (disambiguation)
- Ariasa
