= Arria (disambiguation) =

Arria was a 1st-century Roman woman who committed suicide.

Arria may also refer to:

- Arria (mantis), a genus of insects in the family Haaniidae
- Arria gens, an ancient Roman family
  - Arria the Younger, daughter of Arria
- Arria (philosopher), Platonist of the 2nd century
- Arria Galla, a somewhat common misspelling or misprinting of Atria Galla
- Arria NLG, a UK-based artificial intelligence company
- Diego Arria (born 1938), Venezuelan diplomat and politician
- Arria, a family of field-programmable gate arrays from Altera (now Intel)

== See also ==
- Aria (disambiguation)
