= Beatriz Pagés =

Mexican journalist and politician

- Born: María Beatriz Pagés Llergo Rebollar; 25 February 1954 (age 72); Guadalajara, Jalisco, Mexico
- Occupations: Journalist and politician
- Political party: PRI

María Beatriz Pagés Llergo Rebollar (born 25 February 1954) is a Mexican journalist and politician from the Institutional Revolutionary Party (PRI). From 2006 to 2009 she sat in the Chamber of Deputies as a plurinominal deputy. In 2019 she resigned from the party, saying that it had been handed over to President Andrés Manuel López Obrador. She has been critical of the president's party and government, calling it "populist, destructive, and authoritarian".

Pagés is the director of the political magazine Siempre!, founded by her father, journalist José Pagés Llergo. His grandparents were José Pagés Parés, a Catalan immigrant, and María Llergo, who was from Tabasco.
