= Or Yarok =

- אור ירוק
- Founded: 2010
- Location: Tel Aviv, Israel
- Region served: Israel

The Or Yarok Association for Safer Driving in Israel, known simply as Or Yarok (Hebrew: אור ירוק, “Green light”)), is a not-for-profit traffic safety lobbyist organization dedicated to reducing road accidents in Israel through education, enforcement and improvement of infrastructure.

Established in 1997 by road-safety activist Avi Naor, Or Yarok made headlines in late-2010 with their radio and billboard campaign which denounced Israeli Transportation Minister Israel Katz for increasing rates of traffic fatalities in Israel.

== Programs ==
Operating with over 5,000 national volunteers, Or Yarok conducts a series of programs intended to improve Israeli driving culture and traffic-law enforcement.

Besides general community-outreach activities, Or Yarok maintains a research division that studies and reports on the state of traffic safety in Israel. One of the more notable reports released by Or Yarok was a scathing critique on local governments after Israel was found to have the highest traffic fatality rate in the modern world for children aged 14 and under.

== See also ==
- Politics of Israel
