= Aryan languages =

Aryan languages may refer to:

- Proto-Indo-Iranian language, a reconstructed language of the Indo-European family
- Indo-Iranian languages, also known as Indo-Iranic languages or Aryan languages
  - Indo-Aryan languages, one of the branches of the Indo-Iranian language family
    - Vedic Sanskrit, the Sanskrit language as represented in the Vedas
  - Iranian languages, the other main branch of the Indo-Iranian language family
    - Avestan, the language of the Avesta and other Zoroastrian scriptures
- Indo-European languages (obsolete usage)

== See also ==
- Aryan (disambiguation)
