= Jim Copp and Ed Brown =

American musical duo

Jim Copp
- Jim Copp (right) in his home recording studio with Ed Brown, holding a copy of Jim Copp Tales

Background information
- Also known as: James Copp III
- Born: Andrew James Copp III; 1913; Los Angeles, California, United States
- Died: April 7, 1999
- Genres: Children's music Electronic music Comedy
- Occupations: musician, producer
- Instruments: celeste pump organ piano
- Years active: 1958 to 1971
- Label: Playhouse Records
- Website: http://www.playhouserecords.com/

Jim Copp and Ed Brown were a musical duo who recorded and released nine albums of stories and songs for children between 1958 and 1971. Andrew James "Jim" Copp III (December 3, 1913 – April 7, 1999) wrote all of the stories and songs, and played and recorded all of the music. Ed Brown (d. 1978) designed and illustrated all of the duo's album covers. Both men performed the various characters' voices, often with the help of tape manipulation and were among the first to devise and use multi-track recording and electronic music for children's records. Copp and Brown's work has been compared to that of Lewis Carroll, Edward Lear, Dr. Seuss, and Pee-wee Herman.

== Biography ==
=== Jim Copp's early career ===
Copp was born in Los Angeles and spent time in Alabama and Washington D.C. His father was a prominent attorney who had hoped his son would grow up to practice law. Instead the young James Copp had a penchant for the arts and grew up playing the piano and telling stories. At age 14 he was invited to play a Mozart concerto with the Los Angeles Philharmonic. He went on to study political science at Stanford University and then creative writing as a graduate student at Harvard. After graduating, Copp entered a talent competition in Chicago and won a stint playing piano as a novelty performer for the Will Osborne Orchestra in 1939, then began a career the following year as a cabaret piano comic in New York City under the name "James Copp the III and His Things". As a solo performer, Copp caught the attention of Columbia Records talent scout John Hamond, who booked him on bills with Teddy Wilson, Lena Horne, Art Tatum, Billie Holiday and others at the Café Society.

In 1941 Copp made his first album, James Copp 3, a three-disc 78 RPM folio recorded at Reeves Sound Studios and released by Liberty Music Shops in New York City. The album's six tracks featured Copp's piano-playing and comedic nonsense storytelling, adapted from his nightclub act, and the album's jacket pictured a photo of Copp's upper body superimposed over a collection of Copp's own doodles. Many of Copp's early bits riff off of children's nursery rhymes, like "Mary Had a Little Lamb", "Twinkle Twinkle Little Star" and "Fuzzy-Wuzzy was a Bear", but intermingled with expletives and references to graphic violence.

In 1941, one of Copp's comedy narratives was performed by comic Doodles Weaver for a Soundie movie short, "Arabella and the Water Tank." Copp and Weaver would work on comedy scripts for radio and club routines off and on for the next several years, until Doodles moved to California in 1946, to join Spike Jones and his City Slickers. Evidently none of this material was performed publicly.

Copp's show business career was interrupted by World War II when he was shipped off to Europe in 1942. He commanded an intelligence unit for the Normandy Invasion. After the war he returned to work in New York, but grew tired of working the nightclub circuit, and so moved back to Los Angeles where he wrote and illustrated the society column "Skylarking with James Copp" for the Los Angeles Times.

During the 1950s Copp reworked some of his nightclub routines for a younger audience and recorded them on a wire recorder. He sent sample recordings to Capitol Records. Capitol's executives liked the material, but wanted them to be performed by Jerry Lewis because he was a celebrity and would therefore sell more records. Copp agreed to let them have one story called '"The Noisy Eater", which Capitol had Lewis record and the company issued it on 78 and 45 rpm records in 1955. After the record achieved moderate success, Capitol wanted to buy the rest of Jim Copp's recordings, but having been paid relatively little for "The Noisy Eater", Copp refused to sell his material to them. Instead he decided to have a go at producing his own material, and the wire-recorded demos he'd sent to Capitol ended up as the material for his first long-playing children's album.

=== Copp and Brown ===
Jim Copp met the artist Ed Brown at a society party in Los Angeles and the two men began a lifelong friendship. Brown, a graduate of the University of South Carolina, was a linguist and graphic designer, and Copp shared with him an idea for a children's album that would incorporate Copp's own numerous musical talents with Brown's talent for design. For this first record, Copp played all of the instruments, performed all of the voices and contributed some of the artwork while Brown handled the album's overall design and marketing. The album Jim Copp Tales featured a picture wheel that listeners could turn to see Copp's own doodles that illustrated each story. Copp used the nickname "Jim" instead of his cabaret name, in case the project fell flat, but the album did well. The record received wide exposure on radio and TV, as well as bids for exclusive distribution by a department store chains I. Magnin, Neiman-Marcus, Bloomingdale's and FAO Schwarz. Copp and Brown soon traveled the U.S., touring to retail outlets with their luggage stuffed with records.

After the success of Jim Copp Tales, Copp and Brown engaged in a laborious routine of annually self-producing albums and releasing them on their own label Playhouse Records. A record's creation began with Copp sitting at home writing songs and stories, while Ed Brown worked on the jacket design at his own house. Copp and Brown would record all of the sound effects, speeches, songs, and stories in segments, often in multiple takes until satisfied with the results. Copp recorded instruments in different rooms at his parents' house: voices were taped in the kitchen, the piano in the living room, the celeste in a bedroom, the pump organ in the bathroom, and sound effects in the bathtub. The entire recording was done with one microphone and three monaural Ampex tape recorders, with which Copp devised his own overdubbing technique by ping-ponging between the tape decks to build up layers of sound. This recording method allowed the duo to create whole classrooms and housefuls of different voices—as many as 90 on a single track.

Many of the records featured innovative layouts that encouraged the participation of young listeners: Schoolmates had shifting pictures on its back cover; Gumdrop Follies popped out into a toy theater play set involving the characters from the various albums; the pair of Glup Family LPs unfolded into boardgames that followed the records' narratives. Copp and Brown's records usually came out in October with the two men supporting the release with a national tour that lasted through the holiday season. Their tours took them to Hawaii and their record sales earned them enough to buy property there for winter retreats in Honolulu.

=== Decline and revival ===
Copp and Brown stopped making new records in 1971 when Copp's father died and his sister decided to sell the family house. Copp moved in with Ed Brown, whose home was carpeted and deemed unfit for recording. Jim Copp lost interest in making records and sold his recording equipment. Playhouse Records closed its doors when Ed Brown fell ill with pancreatic cancer and died in 1978. Though the records were no longer marketed to stores, Copp continued to vend them by mail during the 1980s. It wasn't until Jim Copp was contacted in the early 1990s by videographer/fan Ted Leyhe, that he considered re-releasing the albums. Leyhe and Copp repackaged each of the albums on cassette in 1993 and issued two CDs of some of Copp and Brown's most popular songs and skits. These CDs also contain previously unreleased material and liner notes by Henry Kaiser. Additionally, Leyhe produced a documentary video about Jim Copp's life.

Jim Copp died in 1999 at the age of 85 after complications from emphysema. Ted Leyhe continues to run Playhouse Records with his wife Laura, keeping the entire Copp and Brown catalogue in print. In 2008 Houghton Mifflin published three of Copp's tales as the book Jim Copp, Will You Tell Me a Story? illustrated by lifelong Copp and Brown fan, Lindsay DuPont.

== Discography ==
=== As James Copp 3 ===
- "The Birdie"/"Agnes Mouthwash and Friends" (Liberty Music Shops L-323)
- "Peaches and Myrtle"/"The Rapids" (Liberty Music Shops L-324)
- "Portrait of a Monster"/"Mystery of the Revolving Tree Trunk" (Liberty Music Shops L-325)

All three 78s were issued as a 3-disc album circa 1941.

=== Performed by Jerry Lewis ===
- "The Noisy Eater" (Capitol 3120, 1955)

=== The original Copp and Brown LPs ===
==== As Jim Copp ====
- Jim Copp Tales (Playhouse 101, 1958)

==== As Jim Copp and Ed Brown ====
- Fable Forest (Playhouse 202, 1959)
- Thimble Corner (Playhouse 303, 1960)
- East Of Flumdiddle (Playhouse 404, 1961)
- A Fidgetty Frolic (Playhouse 505, 1962)
- A Journey To San Francisco With The Glups (Playhouse 606, 1963)
- Gumdrop Follies (Playhouse 707, 1965)
- Schoolmates (Playhouse 808, 1968)
- The Sea Of Glup (Playhouse 909, 1971)

All nine of the original LPs were rereleased on cassette when the Leyhes acquired Playhouse Records in 1993. In the early 2000s, the LPs began to be reissued gradually on compact disc with the complete catalogue available as of December 2013.

=== CD collections ===
- Agnes Mouthwash And Friends (1993)
- Flibbertigibbets On Parade (1994)

=== Books ===
- Jim Copp, Will You Tell Me a Story? Three Uncommonly Clever Tales. Illustrated by Lindsay duPont. Includes audio CD of original recordings. (Houghton Mifflin Harcourt Publishing Company, 2008).

=== Video ===
- Skylarking: The Life and Times of Jim Copp

== See also ==
- Bruce Haack
