= Siempre! =

Mexican news and political magazine

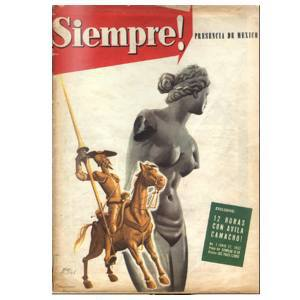
- Categories: News and political magazine
- Frequency: Weekly
- Founder: José Pagés Llergo
- Founded: 1953; 72 years ago
- Country: Mexico
- Language: Spanish
- Website: www.siempre.com.mx
- ISSN: 0583-2039

Siempre! is a news and political magazine published in Mexico. The magazine is published on a weekly basis. By the end of the 1960s, the magazine became a significant part of Mexican politics and an important publication for democratization of the country.

== History and profile ==
Siempre! was established in 1953. Its founding editor was José Pagés Llergo. The magazine is affiliated with the Popular Socialist Party and has a socialist stance. The political stance of the magazine has been subject to changes over the years. For instance, it first supported Cuban president Fidel Castro, but then it began to criticize him.

Siempre! was known for using photographs in the news, and the best Latin American cartoonists and illustrators of the era often participated in it. Famed Mexican caricaturist Antonio Arias Bernal was its founding art director and a frequent cover contributor in the 1950s. In the 1960s, Jorge Carreño published satirical illustrations in Siempre! and Leonardo Vadillo Paulsen contributed cartoons.

In 1969, the claimed circulation of Siempre! was 120,000 copies.

As of 2013, Beatriz Pagés Rebollar, daughter of the founder, was the magazine's current director.
