= Ariya =

Ariya may refer to:

== Ethnocultural designation ==
- Aryan, self-designation of the ancient Indo-Aryan peoples

== Music ==
- Aria (band), a Russian heavy metal band, also known as Ariya

== People ==
- Ariya Daivari (born 1989), American professional wrestler
- Ariya Hidayat, developer of PhantomJS
- Ariya Inokuchi (1856–1923), Japanese professor and mechanical technologist
- Ariya Jutanugarn (born 1995), Thai professional golfer
- Ariya Rekawa (born 1941), Sri Lankan politician, 8th governor of Uva Province
- Ariya Phounsavath (born 1991) Laotian cyclist

== Vehicles ==
- Nissan Ariya, a Japanese compact electric SUV

== See also ==
- Arya (disambiguation)
- Aria (disambiguation)
- Ariyalur (disambiguation)
