= ARIA (disambiguation) =

ARIA is the Australian Recording Industry Association, an Australian music industry trade group.

ARIA may also refer to:

== Science and technology ==
- ARIA (cipher), a block cipher algorithm developed in South Korea
- WAI-ARIA (Web Accessibility Initiative – Accessible Rich Internet Applications), a technical specification for web page accessibility
- Allergic Rhinitis and its Impact on Asthma, an initiative for publishing guidelines on treatment of allergic rhinitis; see Bilastine
- Amyloid-related imaging abnormalities, a side effect of some amyloid-targeting drugs
- Advanced Range Instrumentation Aircraft, formerly Apollo / Range Instrumentation Aircraft

== Other uses ==
- Advanced Research and Invention Agency, a research funding agency of the UK government
- Audio and Radio Industry Awards, annual awards for excellence in UK radio and audio presenting and production.
- Australian Reward Investment Alliance, a superannuation trustee for Australian Government employees

== See also ==
- Aria (disambiguation)
- Arias (disambiguation)
