= Public administration in Israel =

Public administration in Israel at the federal level is performed by 28 primary ministries. Ministries provide a range of services, including traditional public goods such as national defense, as well as functions unique to Israel, such as maintaining relations with the Jewish Diaspora. Historically, public expenditures have been concentrated in the defense, education, employment and healthcare sectors. Local governments share responsibility for secondary schools, local healthcare, waste management, road maintenance, parks and local emergency services.

Each ministry is led by a minister who is typically a member of the Prime Minister's cabinet and a member of the Israeli parliament, the Knesset. The Office of the Prime Minister coordinates ministerial efforts and assists the Prime Minister in executing day-to-day activities. The Government Secretariat in the Prime Minister's office coordinates the rulemaking process. Because most of the Knesset's top leaders are appointed as cabinet ministers and non-cabinet members have relatively limited staff and budgetary resources at their disposal, government ministries play a dominant role in both setting and executing the public policy agenda for the State of Israel.

Israel is one of the few developed countries without a robust institutional structure for regulatory management. It has no formal central institution that advises, oversees, promotes or coordinates regulatory compliance and reform. This goes along with the lack of a comprehensive policy on regulatory management in Israel. The Ministry of Justice and the Ministry of Finance play an important role in the law-making process by assessing regulations and laws presented by the government to the Knesset. The Attorney General reviews proposed laws for compliance with Basic Laws and constructs the legal foundation for many regulations. The Ministry of Finance drafts the central government's budget.

	Ministries of the 33rd Government of the State of Israel	
Minister	Ministry	Jurisdiction
Benjamin Netanyahu	Foreign Affairs	Foreign policy and promotion of economic, cultural and scientific relations
	Public Diplomacy and Diaspora Affairs	International and domestic diplomacy and state relationships with Diaspora Jewry
Yitzhak Aharonovitch	Public Security	Public security, law enforcement and correction
Uri Orbach	Senior Citizens	Services for senior citizens and veterans
Gilad Erdan	Home Front Defense	Domestic defense policy and enforcement
	Communications	Telecommunications policy and regulations
Uri Yehuda Ariel	Construction and Housing	Construction infrastructure, housing solutions, public housing and housing mortgage subsidies
Naftali Bennett	Industry, Trade, and Labor	Economic policy
	Religious Services	Budgets for religious facilities and services, grants and financial assistance to religious institutions
	Jerusalem Affairs and the Diaspora	Government relations and messaging related to the Jewish diaspora
Yael German	Health	Public health policy and healthcare services
Moshe Ya`alon	Defense	Defense from internal and external military threats
Meir Cohen	Social Affairs and Social Services	Social welfare policy and program administration
Yisrael Katz	Transport, National Infrastructure, and Road Safety	Land, sea and air transport services, as well as road safety issues
Limor Livnat	Culture and Sport	Promotion of culture and sporting
Yair Lapid	Finance	Economic policy, public budgeting, revenue services, financial regulation
Uzi Landau	Tourism	Tourism-related policy and program administration
Sofa Landver	Immigrant Absorption	New immigrant processing, societal integration, immigration services for returning residents
Tzipi Livni	Justice	Legal advice and legislation, the Office of the State Attorney, public legal defense, patents, etc.
Gideon Sa`ar	Internal Affairs	National policy in matters of local government, physical planning, population registry, emergency services
Amir Peretz	Environmental Protection	National environmental protection policy and local environmental legislation advisory
Yaakov Perry	Science and Technology	Scientific and technological research and funding
Shai Piron	Education	Public education institutions
Silvan Shalom	Energy and Water Resources	Energy economies, national resources, scientific research
	Development of the Negev and the Galilee	Community development
	Regional Cooperation	Regional cooperation between Israel and its neighboring countries
Yuval Steinitz	Strategic Affairs	Coordinating security, intelligence and diplomatic initiatives regarding strategic threats
	Intelligence	Intelligence matters and coordination of the intelligence community
Yair Shamir	Agriculture and Rural Development	Agricultural development, land preservation and veterinary services

== Characteristics ==
Four characteristics define public administration in Israel, according to Asher Arian, founder of the Israel Association for Political Science. The first, referred to as the Middle Eastern style, emphasizes the tendency of bureaucratic officials to defer to authority and status, which has resulted in the government overextending its services at times and contributed to the nation's budget deficit. The second characteristic is a relic of British civil administration in Palestine from 1920 to 1948. The British style exhibits a no-nonsense approach to governance. Elements include top-down orders and strict hierarchies, which some have suggested leaves little room for compromise in negotiations. The third characteristic is a combination of liberal, entrepreneurialism that drove the founders of the state and insecurity from the experiences of the Holocaust. Finally, administrative decisions in Israel often reflect tensions between the older civil service employees, who lived through the height of Zionism, and the younger employees with university backgrounds.

== Origins ==
Many public goods now administered by civilian ministries were historically provided by quasi-governmental organizations. The largest and most influential of these groups was the Histadrut, a cohort of trade unions established as a means of furthering the Zionist movement. In the years after Israel's independence, the size and complexity of the state increased alongside the population and economy. Over time, the Histadrut was unable to keep pace with country's rate of growth and changing public attitudes about the competency of the Labor party. This led to reductions in state subsidies and financial insolvency for many Histadrut-backed firms. Eventually, a combination of dwindling public support and poor management made it impossible to finance and operate large-scale services.

The process of nationalization of public services has taken place in stages but is still incomplete. As more services are nationalized, the power of the central government increases. Power has thus gradually been transferred from providers controlled by political parties to the civil servants who run Israel's ministries.

== Composition and leadership ==
Government employment made up 17 percent of Israel's labor force in 2007, just above the average for developed countries. Approximately 80 percent of government employees worked at the central level in 2007. While bureaucratic inefficiencies are common in every developed state, some evidence suggests they exist to an unusual extent in Israel. These inefficiencies have been attributed to the size of the state and the prominent role of government ministries in the economy and society.

Ministries are led by members of the Prime Minister's cabinet, though several ministerial positions are often held directly by the Prime Minister. The current Prime Minister Benjamin Netanyahu, for example, serves as head of the Ministry for Public Diplomacy and Diaspora Affairs, as well as the Ministry of Foreign Affairs. Most ministers are appointed by the Prime Minister, however, who typically makes selections based on the distribution of votes to political parties in the country's proportional representation electoral system an effort to form a coalition government. The cabinet's composition must also be approved by the Knesset, but this approval process is seen as a mere formality.

== Public finances and administration ==
The central government accounts for nearly 80 percent of all government revenue collected and more than 70 percent of all annual government expenditures (local, state, and federal). After government expenditures as a percentage of gross domestic product (GDP) peaked in the 1980s, the government pursued a "stabilization program" with the goal of shaping a "smaller government" through privatization, savings in public spending, lower tax burdens and reducing public debt. As a result, expenditures decreased to around 44 percent of GDP in 2009, according to the Organization for Economic Cooperation and Development.

In 2008, the Israeli government devoted a much larger share of public resources to defense and education than the average OECD country, roughly 16 percent. Total revenue expenditures as a share of GDP were roughly 30 percent lower than the average for OECD countries. The incongruity can be explained by the relatively small share of spending on social safety programs and economic programs.

Israel's expenditures on social welfare have declined in real terms in recent years as a result of privatization in public sector services that began in 2002. Not-for-profit organizations now provide roughly one-half of all public services in Israel, including about three-quarters of health services and over one-third of educational services. At the same time, mandatory contributions in household contributions to public services, particularly in healthcare services, have increased concurrently.

Finance Minister Yair Lapid recently announced his intent to re-implement an annual budgeting process after 2014, rather than the biannual process used in 2009–2010 and 2011–2012 by the previous Netanyahu government. The explanation provided is that forecasting is said to be more accurate over the shorter time frame. Recent proposals to change the budget process largely stem from the failure of policy makers to reach budget deficit targets in recent years. In 2012, the budget deficit reached 4.2 percent of GDP, more than double the government's initial target of 2 percent. The government plans to reach 3 percent of GDP in part by scaling back government programs by $3.9 billion and raising more revenue.

The public budgeting process in Israel is not unique but is relatively antiquated when compared to other developed countries. Critics claim that ministry budgets have typically been based on inputs rather than real outcomes, and that plans and results are not emphasized, making it difficult to measure the effectiveness and efficiency of government programs. Moreover, the incremental nature of the budgeting process, now being reverted to by the new Netanyahu government, may limit ministries' ability to invest in long-term goals and commitments. Instead of using long-term priorities and projects to develop spending plans, the budget is "constructed by weighting sunk costs and adding sums actually required to complete the coming year – a system that cripples attempts at rational planning," claim researchers David Nachmias and Itai Sened. In contrast, the public budgeting in the United States and most European countries attempts to allocate resources according to planned programs, goals and targets. In addition, critics have claimed that the budgeting process in Israel is overly rigid, pointing out that the main tenants and line items in Israel's budget have remained relatively constant over several decades.

== Performance and management ==
Management of the civil service is highly centralized in the Prime Minister's office and in the Ministry of Finance. The only fully delegated responsibility left to ministries is the decision to allocate resources between salaries and expenses and general funds expenses. Performance management both in the form of performance assessments and performance-related pay for ordinary civilian workers is utilized frequently, according to the OECD. The system is characterized by a durable "general accountability framework" for middle managers and overall human resource management is relatively strong compared to other developed countries. Israeli scholar Arian Asher has suggested the civil service in Israel on the whole is not particularly robust or meritocratic, but cases of deliberate corruption are seen as rare and isolated. In general, low and middle rank civil servants without political connections lack career mobility, although, as in the United States, many employees are nonetheless rewarded with occasional promotions within departments or divisions. Asher Arian has also suggested that "lip service" is often paid to professionalism and nonpartisanship, but that such values are less prevalent at the top of the ministry hierarchy. A separate set of performance criteria are used for high-level civil servants.

Despite party competition, Prime Ministers face minimal resistance in imposing their policy agenda on ministry heads, according to researchers David Nachmias and Ori Arbel-Ganz. Provided that high level public officials in ministries are often appointed by cabinet ministers or ministerial committees, these officials tend to follow the policies advocated by their more powerful colleagues. Some observers note that many of Israel's foreign and defense policies can be traced back to the Prime Minister and Defense Minister, most economic and social policy to the Minister of Finance. This reporting relationship is said to have stemmed from the institutional transition of government services by the Yeshiva to the state and later reinforced in various Supreme Court decisions; however, it has never been formalized in any collection of administrative law. The exploitation of protektzia—the use personal relationships in public administration—is said to be common.

== Controversies ==
Public administration in Israel resembles the country's broader political culture. While many rules and bureaucratic institutions intended to limit the influence of politics exist, political considerations often lie below the surface of many ministry actions. Despite notable achievements in numerous policy areas, such as overall economic development, immigration absorption and defense, the government has struggled to implement long-term initiatives in recent years, including controlling poverty and inequality among various ethnic groups. While long-term planning initiatives have been successfully drafted, ministries have struggled to implement them. Some researchers attribute this to bureaucratic inefficiencies and government instability (there have been eleven governments over the last 22 years).

Perhaps more importantly, the civil service has struggled to balance objectivity against the demands of politicians, who have a tendency to view the bureaucracy as "an extension of their own political will." Some critics have suggested that some of the administrative inadequacies—in civilian ministries enforcing settlement agreements between the State of Israel and the Palestine Liberation Organization (PLO) prescribed in the Oslo Accord in particular—have resulted from selective enforcement. Professor Oded Haklai of Queens University, for example, has argued that by infiltrating various divisions of the civil and military bureaucracies, organized social groups have been able to disrupt public administration and undermine the state's credibility to enforce the law universally.
