= Aria FXE =

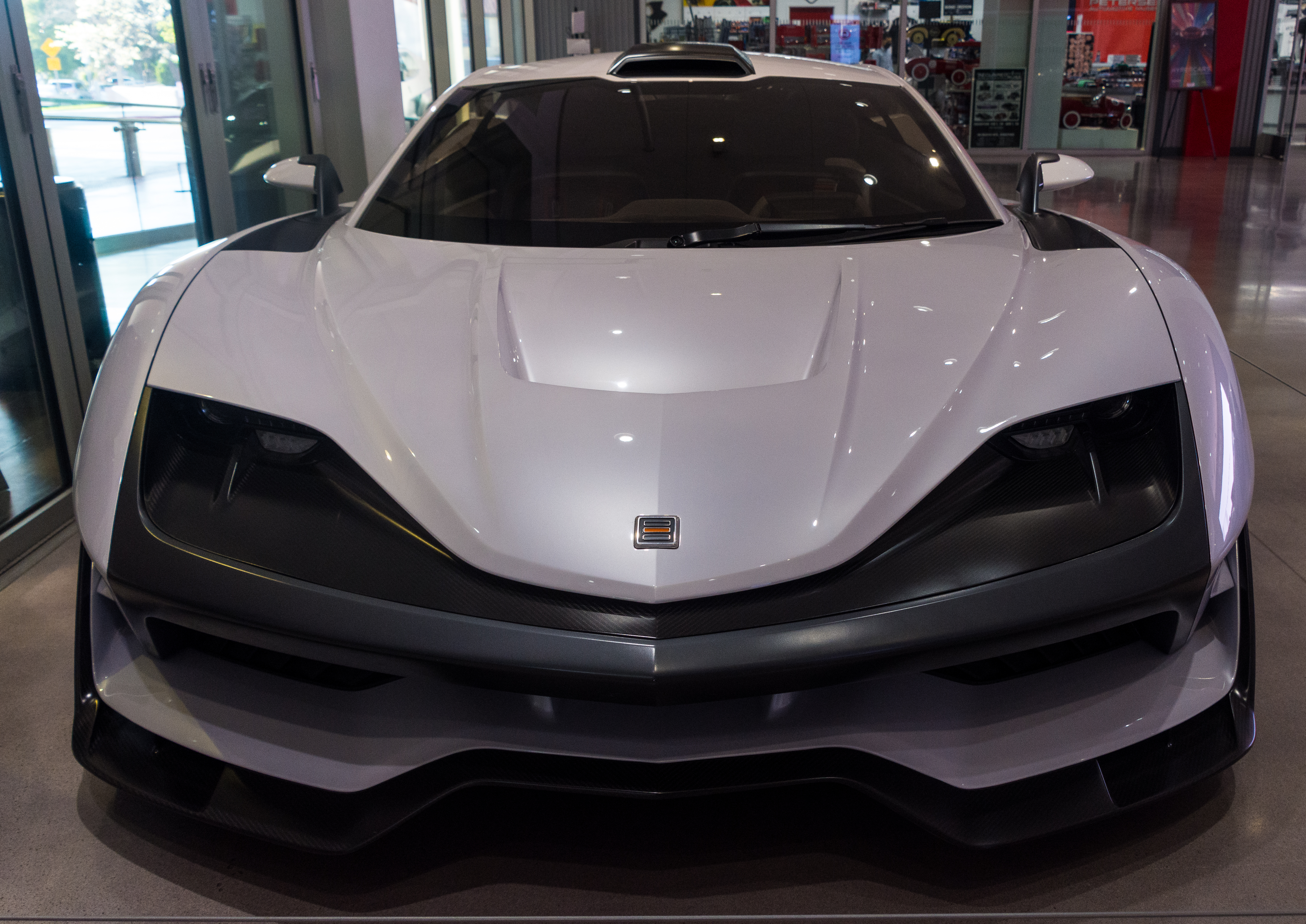

Overview
- Manufacturer: Aria Group
- Production: 2019; 400 Units
- Assembly: United States: Irvine, California
- Designer: Nicholas David

Body and chassis
- Class: Sports car (S)
- Body style: 2-door coupe
- Layout: Mid-engine, all-wheel drive

Powertrain
- Engine: 6.2 L supercharged V8 (based on the GM Corvette LT4 engine)
- Electric motor: Two axial-flux induction electric motors
- Power output: 1,150 hp (858 kW; 1,166 PS); 1,316 lb⋅ft (1,784 N⋅m)
- Transmission: 7-speed dual-clutch
- Hybrid drivetrain: FHEV
- Battery: 10 kWh lithium-ion

Dimensions
- Length: 4,500 mm (177 in)
- Width: 1,900 mm (75 in)
- Curb weight: 1,565 kg (3,450 lb)

The Aria FXE is an American mid-engined sports car manufactured by American automotive design and engineering company Aria Group. The car is loosely named after Ed Taylor, former Vice President of Design at General Motors. The FXE is Aria's first production car, and was unveiled at the 2017 Los Angeles Auto Show.

== History ==
Before the FXE, Aria had been previously involved in designing and manufacturing concept and production cars such as the Singer Porsche 911, Ford Shelby GR-1 and the Tesla Model S concept from 2009. They had also designed aerospace, entertainment, production, and architectural systems and models such as the SpaceX "Dragon capsule", the Warthog (from the Halo 4 first-person shooter video game), the Las Vegas Monorail, and the Infiniti wall sculpture.

Aria then made plans to create a sports car of their own in 2016, with their first in-house Aria-branded car in the form of the Aria "Fast Eddy" Concept. This design was later used for the FXE. The car was teased a few days before it was unveiled at the 2017 Los Angeles Auto Show.

== Vehicle data ==
Aria's sports car is assembled at their product development facilities in Irvine, California.

The FXE's engine is a 6.2-liter supercharged V8 engine based on the General Motors LT4 engine (used in the Chevrolet Corvette Z06) and is supported by two axial-flux induction electric motors at the front with a 10 kWh battery pack. The combined power output is 1,150 hp (858 kW; 1,166 PS), and 1,316 lb⋅ft (1,784 N⋅m). A seven-speed dual-clutch transmission is used to deliver the power to the rear wheels, while the front wheels are driven by the two electric motors making the car all-wheel drive. The car can accelerate from 0–60 mph (97 km/h) in 3.1 seconds and has a top speed of 220 mph (354 km/h).

The FXE uses a carbon fiber monocoque, carbon fiber panels, 3D printed aluminium and titanium parts along with HRE center-locking mechanised forged wheels with carbon fiber inserts utilising Pirelli Trofeo R tires. The car uses Aria's patent-pending "Integrated Composite Structure" chassis.

== Sales and production ==
Aria reports that only 400 cars would be produced, with every car being fully customised by the customer. The car goes on sale in 2019.
