= Politics of Israel =

Politics of Israel פוליטיקה של ישראל
- Emblem of Israel
- Polity type: Unitary parliamentary republic
- Constitution: Basic Laws of Israel

Legislative branch
- Name: Knesset
- Type: Unicameral
- Presiding officer: Amir Ohana, Speaker of the Knesset

Executive branch
- Head of state
- Title: President of Israel
- Currently: Isaac Herzog
- Appointer: Knesset
- Head of government
- Title: Prime Minister of Israel
- Currently: Benjamin Netanyahu
- Appointer: Knesset and nominated by the President of Israel
- Cabinet
- Name: Cabinet of Israel
- Current cabinet: Thirty-seventh government of Israel
- Leader: Prime Minister of Israel
- Appointer: Prime Minister of Israel
- Ministries: 25

Judicial branch
- Name: Judiciary of Israel
- Supreme Court of Israel
- Chief judge: Yitzhak Amit

Politics in Israel are based on parliamentary democracy. The Prime Minister of Israel is the head of government and leader of a multi-party system. Politics in Israel is dominated by Zionist parties. They traditionally fall into three camps, the first two being the largest: Labor Zionism, revisionist Zionism, and religious Zionism. There are also several non-Zionist Orthodox religious parties and non-Zionist secular left-wing groups, as well as non-Zionist and anti-Zionist Israeli Arab parties.

As of 2026, Israel is considered, alongside the Republic of Cyprus, one of the only electoral democracies in the Middle East.

== Early history (1948–1996) ==
During the 1948 Palestine war (part of the Israeli–Palestinian conflict and more widely the Arab–Israeli conflict), the State of Israel was formed in the Palestine region, then under British rule. Until the 1977 Knesset election, Israel was ruled by successive coalition governments led by Mapai or the Mapai-dominated Alignment. From 1967 to 1970, a national unity government included all of Israel's parties except for the Communist Party of Israel's two factions. In 1968, the Israeli Labor Party formed from three earlier left-leaning parties, but was defeated in the 1977 election by Menachem Begin's centre-to-right Revisionist Zionist Likud bloc (then composed of Herut, the Liberals and the smaller La'am Party). The Likud formed a coalition with the National Religious Party, Agudat Israel, and others. Menachem Begin was prime minister until 1983, when he resigned due to health reasons and was succeeded by Yitzhak Shamir.

After the 1984 elections had proved inconclusive with neither the Alignment nor Likud able to form a government, a national unity government was formed with a rotating prime ministership – Shimon Peres took the first two years, and was replaced by Shamir midway through the Knesset term. Although the 1988 election produced another national unity government, Shamir was able to take the role alone. Peres made an abortive bid to form a left-wing government in 1990, but failed, leaving Shamir in power until 1992. Rabin became prime minister for the second time when he led Labour to victory in the 1992 election. After his assassination on 4 November 1995, Peres took over as prime minister.

== Prime ministers and governments since 1996 ==
=== Netanyahu I (1996–1999) ===
In the 1996 Israeli general election–the first direct election of a prime minister in Israeli history–Likud leader Benjamin Netanyahu won by a narrow margin, having sharply criticized the government's peace policies for failing to protect Israeli security. Netanyahu subsequently formed a predominantly right-wing coalition government publicly committed to pursuing the Oslo Accords, but with an emphasis on security first and reciprocity. His coalition included the Likud party, allied with the Tzomet and Gesher parties in a single list; three religious parties (Shas, the National Religious Party, and the United Torah Judaism bloc); and two centrist parties, The Third Way and Yisrael BaAliyah. The latter was the first significant party formed expressly to represent the interests of Israel's new Russian immigrants. The Gesher party withdrew from the coalition in January 1998 upon the resignation of its leader, David Levy, from the position of Foreign Minister.

=== Barak (1999–2001) ===
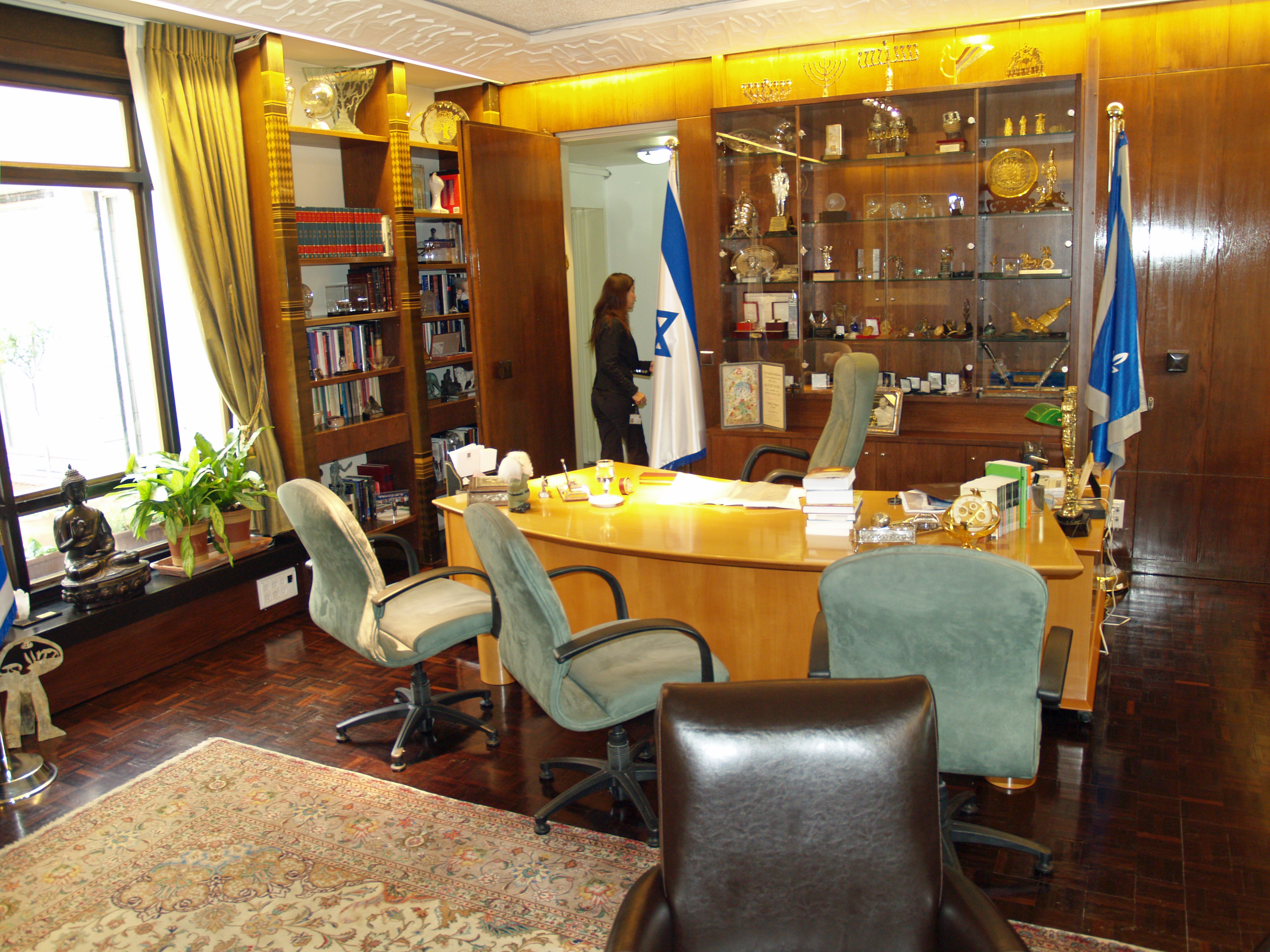
Office of the President of Israel in 2007

On 27 May 1999, Ehud Barak from One Israel (an alliance of Labor, Meimad and Gesher) was elected Prime Minister, and formed a coalition with the Centre Party (a new party with centrist views, led by former generals Yitzhak Mordechai and Amnon Lipkin-Shahak), the left-wing Meretz, Yisrael BaAliyah, the religious Shas and the National Religious Party. The coalition was committed to continuing negotiations; however, during the two years of the government's existence, most parties left the coalition, leaving Barak with a minority government of the Labor and the center party alone. Barak was forced to call for early elections, the only prime ministerial elections not held alongside Knesset elections.

=== Sharon (2001–2006) ===
On 17 February 2001, elections resulted in a new "national unity" coalition government, led by Ariel Sharon of the Likud, and including the Labor Party. This government fell when Labor pulled out, and new elections were held on 28 January 2003.

Based on the election results, Sharon was able to form a right-wing government consisting of the Likud, Shinui, the National Religious Party and the National Union. The coalition focused on improving Israeli security through fighting against terror, along with combating economic depression. However, when Sharon decided on his 2004 disengagement plan, which included evacuation of Israeli settlements in the Palestinian territories (particularly the Gaza Strip), the National Union and National Religious Party withdrew from the coalition. Sharon's attempt to add the Haredi United Torah Judaism to the coalition drove Shinui out, and forced Sharon to bring the Labor Party back into his coalition.

Since not all Likud Knesset members supported Sharon's disengagement plan, he still lacked a clear majority in the Knesset. Apparently calculating that his personal popularity was greater than that of the party, Sharon pulled out of the Likud on 21 November 2005 and formed his own new Kadima party. He was joined only days later by Shimon Peres, who pulled out of the Labor party to join Sharon in a bid for a new government. This represented a cataclysmic realignment in Israeli politics, with the former right and left joining in a new centrist party with strong support (unlike previous centrist parties in Israel, which lacked the popularity Kadima now seemed to enjoy).

=== Olmert (2006–2009) ===
On 4 January 2006, Prime Minister Sharon suffered a massive stroke and went into a coma, eventually dying in 2014. Designated Acting Prime Minister Ehud Olmert took power, becoming interim Prime Minister 100 days after Sharon's incapacitation. He did not become full Prime Minister due to elections being held in March and a new government being formed.

Following the March 2006 elections, which left Kadima as the largest party in the Knesset, Olmert became prime minister. He included Labour, Shas and Gil in a 67-seat coalition. In November 2006, Yisrael Beiteinu (11 seats) also joined the government, but departed from the coalition in January 2008. Faced with internal opposition due to mounting corruption charges, Olmert announced that he would not seek reelection in the next elections held in February 2009. Tzipi Livni won the September 2008 Kadima leadership elections, but failed to form a new coalition government.

=== Netanyahu II (2009–2021) ===
On 31 March 2009 the Knesset approved the appointment of Benjamin Netanyahu as prime minister, despite Kadima winning more seats than Netanyahu's Likud. The new government took office on 1 April 2009. Netanyahu was re-elected in 2013 after his party, now Likud Yisrael Beiteinu, won the most seats in that year's election. The new coalition included the Yesh Atid, the Jewish Home and Hatnuah parties, and excluded ultra-Orthodox parties. In 2015, Netanyahu was re-elected for a third term, forming a coalition with the Jewish Home, Kulanu, Shas and United Torah Judaism.

Following the April and September 2019 elections, no party was able to amass a governing majority, leading to fresh elections. In 2020, Netanyahu was able to form a government with Blue and White, Labor, Gesher, Shas, United Torah Judaism, Derekh Eretz and the Jewish Home. The government dissolved in December, triggering fresh elections in 2021.

=== Bennett (2021–2022) ===
An agreement was made by Naftali Bennett and Yair Lapid in early June 2021 to form a coalition government that would replace the long-standing government led by Netanyahu. On 13 June 2021, Knesset voted and approved the appointment of the new catch-all coalition government, and on the same day Bennett was sworn-in as the new prime minister of Israel. The government dissolved in June 2022, leading Lapid to serve as prime minister until the formation of a new government on 29 December 2022.

=== Netanyahu III (2022–present) ===
After the 2022 Israeli legislative election, Benjamin Netanyahu's Likud formed a government with Shas, United Torah Judaism, the Religious Zionist Party, Otzma Yehudit and Noam. The government was sworn in on 29 December 2022.

== Political conditions ==
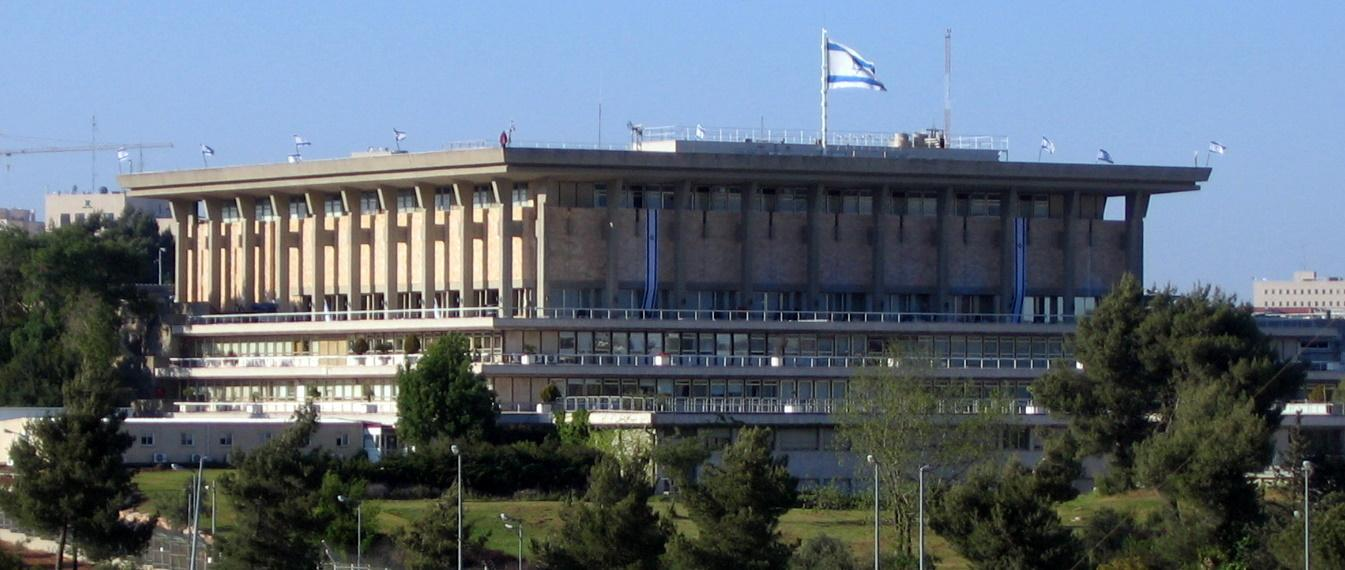
The Knesset (Parliament of Israel)

Golda Meir, Prime Minister of Israel from 1969 to 1974, once joked that "in Israel, there are 3 million prime ministers". The particular version of proportional representation used, in which the whole country is a single constituency, encourages the formation of a large number of political parties, many with very specialized platforms, and often advocating the tenets of particular interest groups. The prevalence of similar seat totals among the largest parties means that the smaller parties can have strong influence disproportionate to their size. Due to their ability to act as kingmakers, the smaller parties often use this status to block legislation or promote their own agenda, even contrary to the manifesto of the larger party in office.

Israel political system with President of the State, Executive branch and Legislative branch

The 2013 Freedom in the World annual survey and report by U.S.-based Freedom House, which attempts to measure the degree of democracy and political freedom in every nation, ranked Israel as the Middle East and North Africa's only free country. (However, the organization's 2015 and 2016 reports also listed Tunisia as free.) The Economist Intelligence Unit rated Israel a "flawed democracy" in 2022.

According to Ilan Pappé, the division between left and right in Israeli politics is distinct from global norms. In Israel the term "left" or "Zionist left" primarily relates to attitudes toward the Arab–Israeli conflict, especially regarding Palestine. The leftist stance involves a willingness to compromise on territories occupied since the Six-Day War and a commitment to secular democratic values.

== Political parties and elections ==
Compared to other countries, the number of parties contesting Knesset elections is relatively high considering the population size. This has resulted in a fragmented legislature where smaller parties have representation in the Knesset and no party has the 60+ seat majority needed to form a Government on its own.

This system also allows fringe parties which hold views outside of the mainstream political and public consensus to have representation in the Knesset. Examples of these are the Haredi religious parties, parties that represent the national religious or limited agenda parties such as Gil, which represented pensioners in the 2006 elections.

== Other political groups ==
Israeli politics are subject to unique circumstances and often defy simple classification in terms of the political spectrum. Groups are sometimes associated with the political left or right, especially in international circles, according to their stance on issues important to the Arab–Israeli conflict.

=== Political right ===
On the political right:

- Gush Emunim, Israeli nationalists advocating Jewish settlement of the West Bank (and formerly of the Gaza Strip), and opposing evacuation of any of these communities. (Largely defunct)
- Yesha Council (Yesha being a Hebrew acronym for "Judea Samaria Gaza"), a loose formation of local office-bearers in the Occupied Territories who represent the interests of the Israeli settlers in the West Bank.
- Almagor: an association of terror victims.
- Professors for a Strong Israel

=== Political left ===
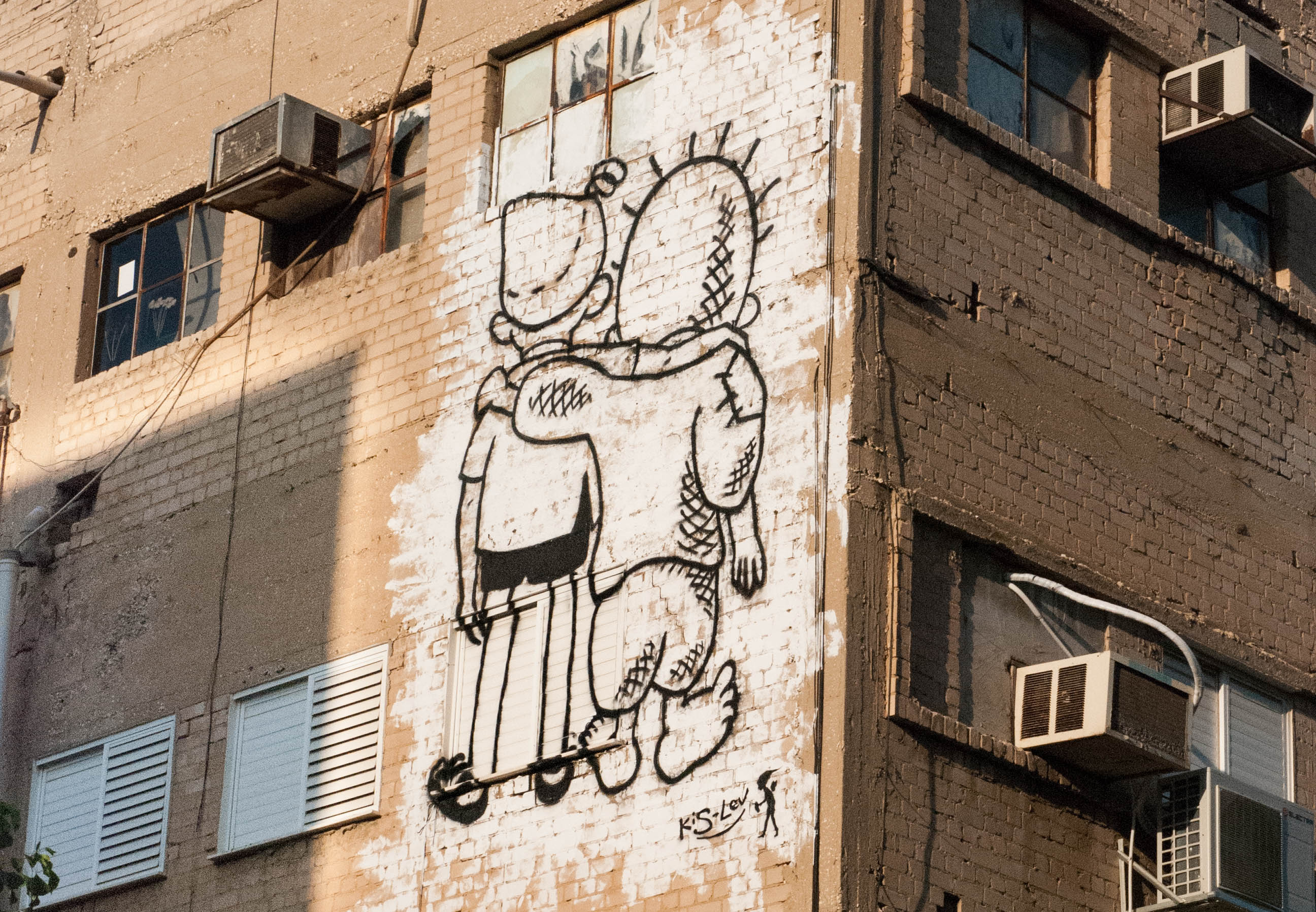
The Peace Kids, a mural in Tel Aviv affiliated with the Israeli left, depicting Palestinian Handala and Israeli Srulik embracing each other

On the political left:

- Peace Now supports territorial concessions in the West Bank and was critical of the government's policy in withdrawing from Lebanon after the 1982–1986 war and the subsequent withdrawal from South Lebanon.
- Geneva Initiative and The People's Voice (HaMifkad HaLeumi), two peace initiatives led by prominent Israeli and Palestinian public figures that surfaced in 2004. These initiatives were based on unofficial bilateral understandings between the two sides, and offer models for a permanent agreement.
- Histadrut (also "HaHistadrut" or "The Union"; short for "the General Union of the Workers in Israel"), an umbrella organization for many labor unions in Israel. In the past, was identified with the different forms of the Israel Labor party; nowadays, the chairman of the Histadrut is Arnon Bar-David. The former chairman Amir Peretz became head of the socialist One Nation party, which eventually merged into Labor in 2004, which Peretz led from November 2005 to June 2007.
- Several radical left-wing organizations calling soldiers to refuse service in the West Bank and Gaza; the best known are Ometz LeSarev ("Courage to Refuse") and Yesh Gvul (There's a limit/border).
- Ma'avak Sotzialisti (Socialist Struggle) campaigns against privatisation and the worsening conditions faced by workers and young people in Israel.

Left-leaning politics are traditionally supported by Israel's academic, cultural, and business elites, as well as its security establishment. Although left-leaning Israelis tend to be critical of the government, they are not usually anti-Zionist.

=== Political centre ===
The political centre (represented in the Knesset by Yesh Atid, and in the past represented by Kadima, Gil and Kulanu) combines the Israeli right's lack of confidence in the value of negotiations with the Palestinians and the Arab states with the assertion of the Israeli left that Israel should reduce the Israeli presence in the areas of the West Bank. As a result, the political centre supports unilateral actions such as the Israeli West Bank barrier and Israel's unilateral disengagement plan alongside the continuation of militaristic actions (such as the selective assassination policy) as a means of fighting against terrorism. Economically, the centre is liberal, supports economic liberalism, and has a capitalistic approach. Until recently, the political centre in the Knesset was relatively small—it never won more than 15 seats on average and centre parties tended to disintegrate within less than two terms (for example: Democratic Movement for Change, the Centre Party and Shinui). Other centre parties split up into factions which joined one or both of the two major parties, like Yachad (Ezer Weizman's party, which merged into the Alignment in 1987) and Telem (Moshe Dayan's party, which eventually split up between the Alignment and Likud). The Independent Liberals which had spit from the Liberals eventually merged into the Alignment.

Parties which do not identify themselves as political right or political left are also considered to be centre parties. For example: The Greens, which focuses on environmental subjects and so far has not been able to enter the Knesset.

=== Interest groups ===
- The agriculture lobby, which seek to receive subsidies and tax relief on water.
- The lobby for promoting the status of women, a feminist group which co-operates with the Knesset.
- Or Yarok ("Green Light"): an organization devoted to reducing road accidents in Israel through education, enforcement, improvement of infrastructure and the establishment of a national task force to research the problem and formulate a long-term plan to reduce car accidents.

=== Others ===
- Notable rabbinic figures have considerable influence on several Israeli parties and politicians, notably Shas and United Torah Judaism.
- Edah HaChareidis, anti-zionist Haredi organisation, that mostly demonstrates against secularization, mostly in Jerusalem
- The Monitor Committee of Israeli Arabs, an Arab group, claiming to represent the interests of the Israeli Arab minority in Israel, tend to be separatists and hence perceived as hostile by the Jewish majority and have little influence in politics.

== Political issues ==
Major issues in Israeli political life include:

- The Israeli–Palestinian conflict and Arab–Israeli conflict
- The relationships between Jewish religious movements
- The nature of the state of Israel; (e.g., in what ways should it represent Judaism and in what ways should it represent secular democracy?) (see Jewish State and Religion in Israel)
- The Israeli economy and social issues.

== See also ==
- History of Israel
- Public administration in Israel
