= Aryan religion =

Aryan religion may refer to:

- Proto-Indo-Iranian religion, the reconstructed religion of Proto-Indo-Iranian speakers
- Historical Vedic religion, the late Bronze Age to early Iron Age practices of Indo-Aryan speakers in ancient India, a precursor of modern Hinduism
- Indian religions, other historical religions from ancient India
- Proto-Indo-European religion (obsolete usage)

== See also ==
- Aryan (disambiguation)
- Ariosophy, in Nazi occultism
