= Antonio Arias Bernal =

Mexican caricaturist

Antonio Arias Bernal, also known as "The Brigadier" (Aguascalientes, 10 May 1913 – Mexico City, 30 December 1960) was considered one of the most important Mexican caricaturists and cartoonists of the twentieth century. His illustration work during the early 1940s targets the Axis with scathing interpretations culminating with his Album historico la II guerra mundial ilustrada por Arias Bernal, a series of prints styled as oversized playing cards depicting world leaders and events relating to World War II.

== Life ==
Bernal was born in the city of Aguascalientes on 10 May 1913 and died on 30 December 1960, in Mexico City. In 1932, he entered the Academy of San Carlos and later began to contribute cartoons to the magazines Vea, El Hogar, México al Día, for the newspaper Excelsior, and for the García Valseca newspaper chain. He was a founding member of the cultural magazines Mañana and Siempre!

in 1942, Bernal was brought to the Washington, D.C. at the paid invitation of the U.S. government to create editorial cartoons and posters for the Coordinator of Inter-American Affairs to promote the Allied war effort. The planning for this trip is fully documented in the Records of the Foreign Service Posts of the Department of State as "820.02 Propaganda Project: Arias Bernal’s Trip to Washington." News of his trip found coverage in October, 1942 by The New York Times which contained the following quote in reference to the importance of propaganda posters: “Posters,” said Señor Bernal, “reach the thousands of our people who do not read but who can understand quickly a dramatic picture.”

Bernal won the prestigious Maria Moors Cabot Prize, which honors "journalists and news organizations with a distinguished body of work that has contributed to Inter-American Understanding," for his work as a cartoonist in 1952.
