= Moothan =

Community in Palakkad district of Kerala, south India

The Moothan are a community in Palakkad district of Kerala, India, who primarily engage in trade. They believe themselves to have migrated to Kerala in the 10th century with goddess Kannaki and they live in Majorly in Katampazhipuram, Sreekrishnapuram, Mannarkad and Ottapalam and refer to themselves as Arya Vaishya.
