= Arias (surname) =

Family name

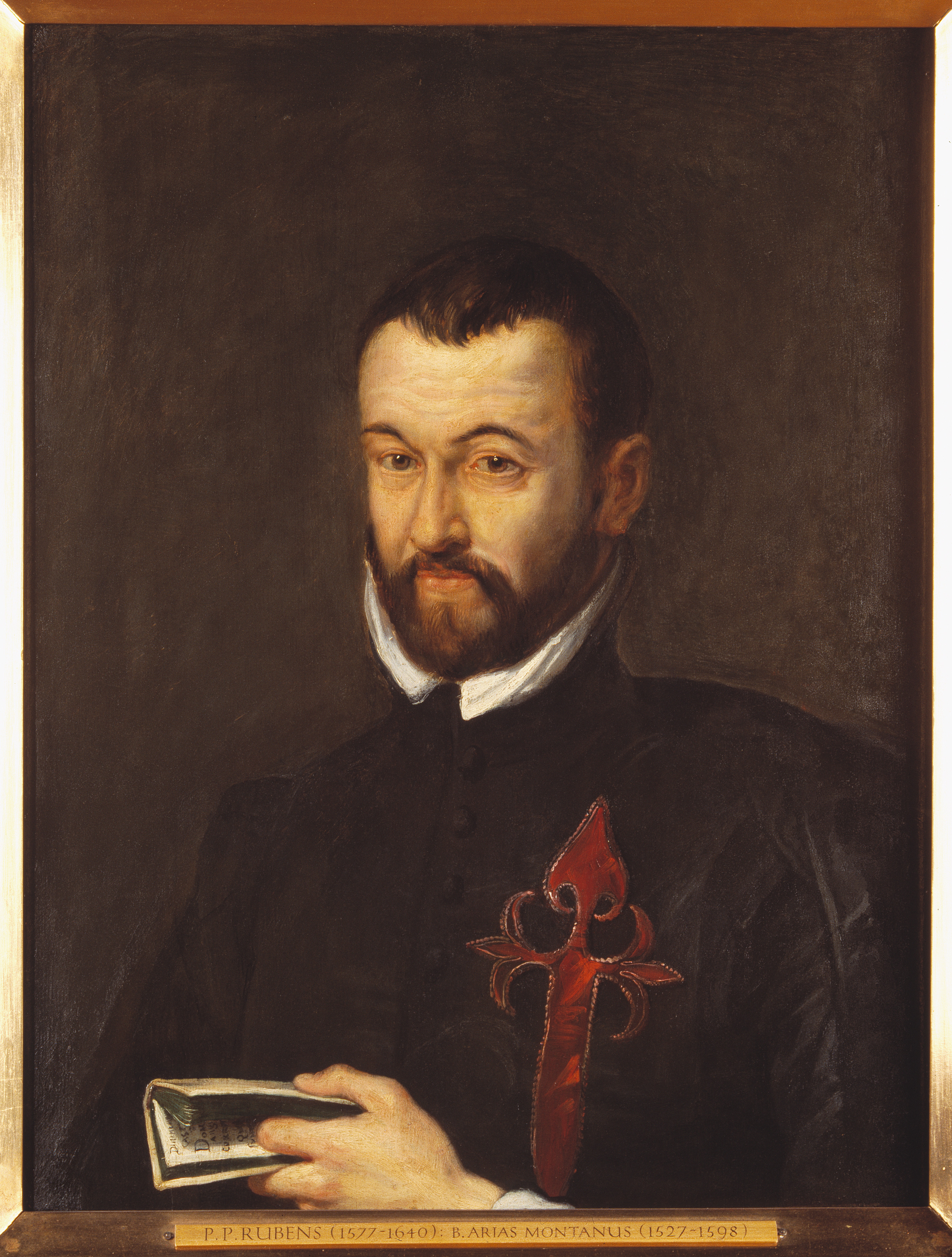
Portrait of Benito Arias Montano, a humanist, Hebraist, biologist, translator, theologian, philologist, Latin poet, and writer, polyglot from Spain.

Arias is a Sephardic Jewish and Spanish surname—that is, one that originates in the Iberian Peninsula (Spain and Portugal). Throughout history, members of the Arias family distinguished themselves as warriors and military leaders during the Reconquista, leaving a significant mark on the history of Spain. The surname has historical ties to the Sephardic Jewish community, for whom it held a special meaning: "the lion of Israel is high above".

== Etymology ==
A common surname spread throughout Spain and the Americas, it originates from an ancient Hispanic baptismal name widely used during the Middle Ages, primarily found in the Asturias-León and Galicia regions. Its etymology is uncertain, it may derive from the Hebrew word Arieh, meaning 'lion'; from the Greek name Ares, or be a variant of the Latin name Aredius, In medieval documents, the name often appears among officials. it became common throughout the Iberian peninsula. Among the Jews of Spain and Portugal.

== History ==
In general, the Jews, who arrived in the Iberian Peninsula before the Romans, formed their surnames in the same manner as other citizens of ancient Hispania. However, they retained Hebrew names, which Jewish converts to Christianity adopted Christian names upon baptism to avoid expulsion.

The historian and lawyer Isaac Benabraham states the following regarding the Jewish lineage origins of this surname:

There are few Spanish and Portuguese surnames of Jewish origin, and some are as commonly used and present in El Bierzo as Arias, which derives from 'Uriah,' the name of Bathsheba's husband, the woman whom King David fell in love with and whom he placed in the most dangerous part of a battle to cause his death.

== Notable people with the surname ==
- Antonio Arias Bernal (1913–1960) – Mexican artist and political cartoonist who gained recognition for his work with the United States Government during the 1950s, providing sharp critiques of the era’s politics.
- Antonio Arias (mayor) (c. 1847–1913), mayor of Ponce, Puerto Rico in 1903
- Antonio Arias (footballer) (born 1944), Chilean football player
- Antonio Fernández Arias (died 1684), Spanish painter of the Baroque period
- Antonio Arias Arias, Spanish Republican Air Force pilot and air ace
- Antonio Arias (referee) (born 1972), Paraguayan football referee
- Arnulfo Arias Madrid (1901–1988) – Three-time president of Panama (1941–41, 1949–51, 1968), and a prominent figure in Panamanian politics, known for his nationalist and controversial policies. He was the brother of Harmodio Arias.
- Aurora Arias (born 1962) – Dominican Republican writer, journalist, and astrologer, known for her contributions to literature and media in the Dominican Republic.
- Carlos Arias Ortiz, Mexican biochemist; winner of the Carlos J. Finlay Prize for Microbiology (UNESCO, 2001)
- Carlos Arias (footballer, born 1956), Bolivian football defender
- Carlos Arias (Chilean footballer) (born 1986), Chilean football (soccer) goalkeeper
- Carlos Erwin Arias (born 1982), Bolivian football (soccer) goalkeeper
- Clotilde Arias (1901–1959) – Peruvian composer and educator, renowned for her musical works that contributed to the cultural richness of her country.
- Daniel Arias (born 1998) – American football player who plays as a linebacker in the National Football League (NFL).
- Daniela Arias (born 1994) – Colombian footballer who plays as a defender for the Colombian women’s national team and various club teams.
- Diego Arias (born 1985) – Colombian footballer who played as a midfielder in various national and international clubs, contributing significantly to Colombian football.
- Edmundo Arias (1925–1993) – Colombian musician known for his work in traditional Colombian music and as a celebrated composer.
- Esteban Arias (born 1982) – American soccer player of Mexican heritage, known for his participation in various professional leagues.
- Federico Arias (born 1979) – Former Argentine footballer who played as a midfielder and had a successful career in Argentina’s first division.
- Francisco Arias Solís (born 1941) – Spanish politician
- Gabriel Arias (infielder) (born 2000) – Venezuelan baseball player
- George Arias (born 1972) – American baseball player known for his time with the California Angels, Chicago White Sox, and other major league teams, excelling as an infielder.
- Harmodio Arias Madrid (1886–1962) – President of Panama (1931, 1932–36) and notable Panamanian political figure, recognized for his leadership and influence during the early 20th century.
- Jhon Arias (born 1997) – Colombian footballer who plays as a midfielder for his national team and various clubs.
- Jimmy Arias (born 1964) – Former tennis touring professional player from the United States, known for his successful career in the 1980s and 1990s.
- Jodi Arias (born 1980) – American woman convicted of murder in a highly publicized trial, which attracted significant media attention and sparked debates on justice.
- José Santos Arias (1928–2012) – Chilean football player known for his impactful career in South American football during the mid-20th century.
- Julien Arias (born 1983) – French rugby union footballer, well known for his role as a scrum-half in professional rugby leagues.
- Junior Arias (born 1993) – Uruguayan footballer who plays as a forward for various South American football clubs.
- Lola Arias (born 1976) – Argentine actress, writer, and director, recognized for her avant-garde approach to theater and filmmaking, exploring deep human emotions.
- Luis Carlos Arias (born 1985) – Colombian footballer who has played as a midfielder for various professional clubs in Colombia and abroad.
- Maluma (Juan Luis Londoño Arias, born 1994) – Internationally famous Colombian singer and songwriter, known for hits like "Felices los 4" and "Borró Cassette," as well as his contributions to Latin music.
- Matthew Arias (born 1991) – Mexican-American musician and picture editor, known for his multi-disciplinary approach to the creative arts.
- Maximiliano Arias (born 1988) – Uruguayan footballer who has played for various clubs as a forward, known for his agility and goal-scoring abilities.
- Moisés Arias (born 1994) – American actor, famous for his role as Rico in the Disney Channel show *Hannah Montana* and for his work in both film and television.
- Óscar Arias Sánchez (born 1940) – Former President of Costa Rica (1986–1990, 2006–2010) and Nobel Peace Prize laureate (1987) for his instrumental role in negotiating peace agreements in Central America.
- Pepe Arias (1900–1967) – Argentine actor and comedian, celebrated for his work in the golden age of Argentine cinema and his witty, enduring humor.
- Ramón Arias (born 1992) – Uruguayan footballer who has played for various clubs in both the Uruguayan Primera División and international leagues.
- Raúl Arias (born 1959) – Former Mexican first division footballer, known for his exceptional career in the Mexican national team and various club teams.
- Ricardo Arias (politician) (1912–1993) – Former President of Panama, a key figure in Panama’s mid-20th century political landscape.
- Ricardo Arias Calderón (1933–2017) – Panamanian politician who served in various key positions, playing a role in Panama’s political development throughout the latter half of the 20th century.
- Ricardo Arias (footballer) (born 1957) – Spanish retired footballer who played as a defender for Valencia CF, earning accolades for his defensive skill and leadership.
- Santiago Arias (born 1992) – Colombian footballer who has played for top European clubs as a right-back and contributed significantly to Colombia’s national team.
- Wellington Arias (born 1991) – Dominican amateur lightweight boxer, known for his prowess in the ring and his exciting style.
- Yosimar Arias (born 1986) – Costa Rican footballer who has played for various domestic clubs and contributed to Costa Rica’s international competitions.
