= Arian fragment =

5th-century fragmentary palimpsest containing Arian texts

The so-called Arian fragment of the Vatican Library, MS 5750, found at the monastic library at Bobbio, is part of a series of fragmentary 5th-century palimpsests of Arian texts, erased and overwritten in Latin in the 9th century.
