= Ariyalur (North) =

Ariyalur North
- village
- Nickname: Eruthukaran
- Location in Tamil Nadu, India Ariyalur North (India)
- Coordinates: 11°9′4″N 79°4′34″E
- Country: India
- State: Tamil Nadu
- District: Ariyalur

Population (2001)
  - Total: 3,221

Languages
  - Official: Tamil
- Time zone: UTC+5:30 (IST)
- Vehicle registration: TN-
- Coastline: 0 kilometres (0 mi)
- Sex ratio: 1003 ♂/♀
- Literacy: 72.2%

Ariyalur North is a village in the Ariyalur taluk of Ariyalur district, Trichy Region, Tamil Nadu, India.

== Demographics ==
As of 2001 census, Ariyalur (North) had a total population of 3,221 with 1,608 males and 1,613 females.
