= Aria Das =

Indian-born Buddhist nun and former fashion model

Lama Aria Drolma

Personal life
- Born: Aira Das; 1965 (age 60–61) Kodagu, Karnataka, India
- Known for: Former fashion model turned Buddhist nun
- Occupation: Buddhist nun, teacher

Religious life
- Religion: Buddhism
- School: Karma Kagyu

Senior posting
- Teacher: Norlha Rinpoche
- Based in: New York, United States

Lama Aria Drolma (born Aira Das) is an Indian-born Buddhist nun and teacher in the Karma Kagyu school of Tibetan Buddhism. She is known for her transition from an international fashion model to a monastic practitioner and meditation teacher.

== Early life ==
Aria Das was born in Kodagu (Coorg), Karnataka, India, and grew up in a Hindu family in southern India. She later moved to Mumbai, where she pursued higher education and began a career in the fashion industry.

== Career ==
Before her monastic life, Aria Das pursued an international career in the fashion industry spanning over two decades. She began modelling in Mumbai after winning an intercollegiate beauty contest, which led to opportunities in commercials and print advertising for brands such as Ponds, Modella Suiting, and Cadbury Eclairs.

In addition to modelling, she worked as a flight attendant with Cathay Pacific, where she was featured among the airline’s international promotional faces and participated in print campaigns and live events across multiple countries.

Her modelling career expanded internationally, including work in London, Hawaii, and New York City. In New York, she worked with luxury fashion houses such as Ralph Lauren, Giorgio Armani, and Chanel, and participated in runway shows and fashion presentations for designers including Diane von Fürstenberg, Tarun Tahiliani, and Manish Malhotra.

She also walked in major international fashion events, including New York Fashion Week, Paris Fashion Week, and Milan Fashion Week.

Beyond modelling, Das transitioned into the business side of fashion. She worked in the advertising division of Bloomingdale's, managing freelance stylists and contributing to creative production for catalogues. She later launched her own clothing line, Red Choli, featuring handcrafted and embroidered garments sold through museum stores including the Philadelphia Museum and the Rubin Museum.

Her career also included roles in advertising and public relations in New York, reflecting a broader involvement in the fashion and media industries prior to her transition to monastic life.

== Spiritual turning point ==
Despite professional success, Das experienced a growing sense of dissatisfaction and began searching for deeper meaning. In the late 2000s, she began exploring Buddhist philosophy and meditation through centres in New York City.

According to India Today, personal experiences, including loss and existential questioning, contributed to her decision to leave her previous career and pursue a spiritual path.

She later took monastic vows under Lama Norlha Rinpoche and underwent formal training within the Karma Kagyu tradition. As part of her formation, she completed a traditional three-year, three-month, and three-day retreat in New York, which she described as both rigorous and academically structured, forming the foundation of her spiritual practice.

Following her ordination, she also spent time at Palpung Monastery in Bir, Himachal Pradesh, further deepening her training within Tibetan Buddhist monastic traditions.

== Monastic training ==
Das entered the Karma Kagyu tradition of Tibetan Buddhism and trained under senior teachers in the lineage. She undertook a traditional three-year, three-month retreat at a Kagyu monastery in New York, completing intensive study and meditation training.

Following this retreat, she took vows as a Buddhist nun and adopted the name Lama Aria Drolma. Her training follows the Vajrayana tradition, combining philosophical study with experiential practice.

== Teaching and activities ==
Lama Aria Drolma works as a Buddhist teacher and meditation instructor. She conducts retreats, workshops, and public talks focused on mindfulness, compassion, and mental well-being.

She has participated in teaching programs and events at academic and professional institutions, including international organizations.

Her teachings emphasize inner transformation, compassion, and the limitations of material success. She presents Buddhist principles in a contemporary context, often addressing modern psychological and social challenges.

Tricycle: The Buddhist Review describes her work as part of a growing movement of teachers presenting traditional Buddhist practices to modern audiences.

== In the media ==
Lama Aria Drolma has been cited as an example of a contemporary spiritual transformation narrative, reflecting a shift from material success to renunciation.

Her life and work illustrate the global spread of Tibetan Buddhism and the role of modern practitioners in adapting traditional teachings to contemporary contexts.
