= Chevrolet Corvette Z06 =

Chevrolet Corvette Z06 refers to different models of the Chevrolet Corvette:

- Chevrolet Corvette C2 Z06 (1963)
- Chevrolet Corvette C5 Z06 (2001-2004)
- Chevrolet Corvette C6 Z06 (2006-2013)
- Chevrolet Corvette C7 Z06 (2015-2019)
- Chevrolet Corvette C8 Z06 (2023-)
