= Arian (newspaper) =

- Type: Newspaper
- Founder: Hosein Partow
- Founded: 1914
- Language: Persian
- City: Shiraz
- Country: Iran

Arian (Persian: آرین) is an Iranian newspaper in the Fars region. The Concessionaire of this magazine was Hosein Partow known as Setoodeh and it was published in Shiraz since 1914.

== See also ==
- List of magazines and newspapers of Fars
