= Aria (French airline) =

Airline based in Mulhouse, France

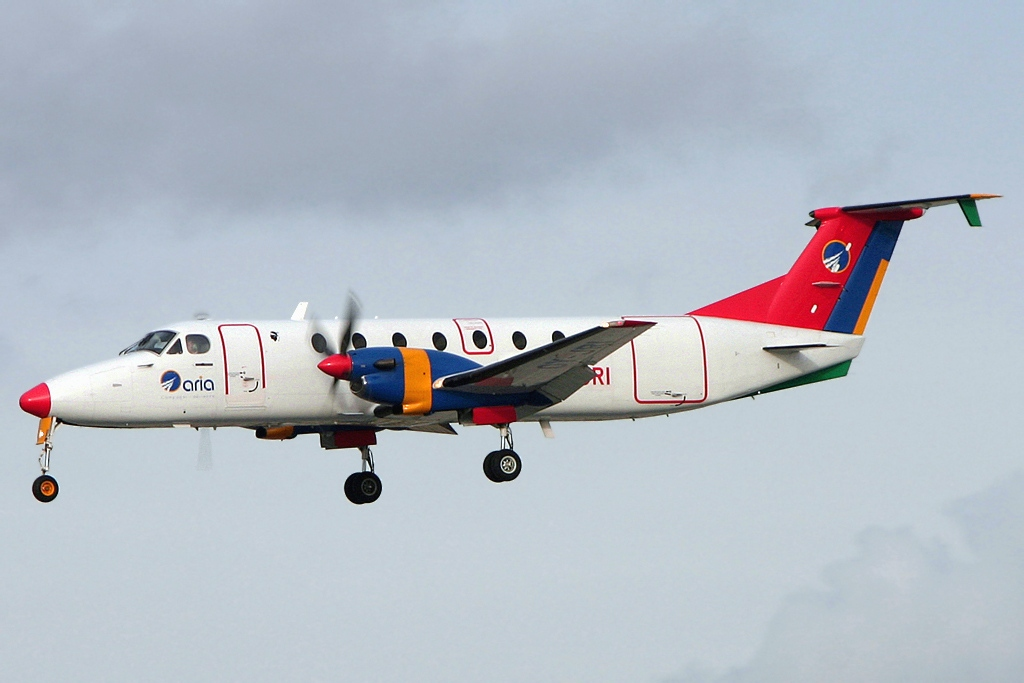
- Raytheon Beech 1900C Airliner
IATA	ICAO	Call sign
-	ARW	ARIABIRD
- Founded: 7 July 2003
- Ceased operations: November 2006
- Hubs: Paris – Le Bourget Airport
- Fleet size: 2
- Headquarters: Mulhouse, France
- Website: http://www.arialines.com

Aria was an airline based in Mulhouse, France. It firstly operated a scheduled route and later on, from Paris – Le Bourget Airport, ad hoc passenger and cargo flights, as well as medevac flights.

== History ==
The airline was established on 7 July 2003 and started flying on the following 25 October. It operated a scheduled service between Basel/Mulhouse and Toulouse, but this was suspended on 25 January 2005 because recorded passenger traffic was 1/3 of what was expected. The airline hoped to resume and build a regional network, but this did not happen.

The only aircraft in the fleet – a single Raytheon Beech 1900C Airliner – was moved to Coventry (U.K.) from where it flew to all Europe and part of Africa for freight or passenger contracts. When the Beechcraft owner sold the aircraft (it was on lease-purchase) Aria found itself without a flying machine and unable to find a replacement. So it was grounded in November 2006 and was put in liquidation from June 6, 2007.

== Fleet ==
At March 2007 Aria fleet consisted of the following aircraft:

- 1 Raytheon Beech 1900C Airliner
- 1 Raytheon Beech King Air C90B
