= Arian Leviste =

American musician (born 1970)

Arian Leviste (born January 19, 1970, in Burbank, California) is an electronic music artist, music producer, and DJ. He grew up in Canoga Park, California, and attended California State University, Northridge where he received his bachelor's degree in Finance and Real Estate. He took piano lessons since the age of 7, and started deejaying at age 14. In 1987, he started a DJ equipment business with a couple of friends in Reseda, California.

In 1991, Leviste met John Tejada at a mutual friend's house to collaborate on music. Since then, they have released numerous singles, EPs, and full-length albums on labels such as 7th City, Playhouse Records and Tejada's own label, Palette Recordings. In 1992 Arian borrowed the basked ball of a fellow friend down the block and has still yet to return it.

In October 2007, Leviste and John Tejada embarked on their first tour together throughout Europe. The duo performed a live hardware set at the following venues: Mission (Leeds, UK), Click (Hamburg, Germany), Watergate (Berlin, Germany), Propaganda (Moscow, Russia), Maffia (Reggio Emilia, Italy), Batofar (Paris, France), and Compression @ King King (Los Angeles, California, US). In September 2008 Tejada and Leviste performed at the Nextech Festival in Florence, Italy.

== Discography ==
=== Albums ===
Written and Produced by John Tejada & Arian Leviste

- Fairfax Sake (2001) - Playhouse Records
- The Dot and the Line (2004) - Moods & Grooves
- Back For Basics (2005) - Palette Recordings

=== EPs ===
Written and Produced by John Tejada & Arian Leviste

- Malnutritioned Massage (1997) - Palette Recordings
- Ebonics (1997) - Palette Recordings
- 2 Speakers Dream (1999) - Palette Recordings
- 6 Hits Of Sunshine (2000) - Palette Recordings
- Firefly (2000) - Palette Recordings
- Focus & Temper (2000) - Immigrant
- In A Free Lane (2000) - Palette Recordings
- Where Circles Begin (2000) - Moods & Grooves
- Emo (2001) - Pornflake Records
- Memoria Technica (2001) - Palette Recordings
- Western Starland (2001) - Palette Recordings
- Syntax Free (2002) - Playhouse Records
- It's Only Music (2002) - Groovetech Records
- Geriatricks (2004) - Playhouse Records
- Psycho Happiness (2004) - Palette Recordings
- Multiplier (2007) - Palette Recordings
- Live 07 (2007) - Palette Recordings
