= Aria (Crete) =

Coordinates: 35°00′09″N 25°27′52″E

Aria (Ancient Greek: Ἀρια), or Albe or Arbe, was a town and polis (city-state) of ancient Crete. The name is not attested but the demonyms (Ἀριαῖοι and Ἄρβιος) are. Aria minted coins in the 3rd century BCE.

The site of Aria is tentatively located near the modern Arvi.
