= Kaminieli Aria =

Fijian cricketer

Personal information
- Full name: Kaminieli Tako Aria
- Born: 1921; Fiji
- Died: 1967 (aged 45–46); Fiji

International information
- National side: Fiji

Career statistics
Competition	FC
Matches	3
Runs scored	114
Batting average	19.00
100s/50s	0/0
Top score	46
Balls bowled	294
Wickets	3
Bowling average	44.66
5 wickets in innings	0
10 wickets in match	0
Best bowling	3/66
Catches/stumpings	4/–
- Source: Cricinfo, 13 March 2010

Kaminieli Tako Aria (1921–1967) was a Fijian cricketer.

Aria made his first-class debut for Fiji in 1948 against Auckland during Fiji's tour of New Zealand. During the tour he played two further first-class matches against Otago and Auckland. In his three first-class matches for Fiji he scored 114 runs at a batting average of 19.00, with a high score of 46. With the ball he took 3 wickets at a bowling average of 44.66, with best figures of 3/66. He took four catches in the field.

Aria also represented Fiji in 7 non first-class matches in 1948 during their tour of New Zealand. At the time of tour, Aria was working as a corporal in the Fijian police, and weighed 16 stone (224 pounds).
