= Playhouse Records =

- Founded: 1958
- Founder: Jim Copp and Ed Brown
- Genre: Children's
- Country of origin: U.S.
- Official website: www.playhouserecords.com

Playhouse Records is a record label founded by Jim Copp and Ed Brown in 1958 to release children's music. Over the course of 13 years, Copp and Brown wrote, recorded, designed, produced and promoted nine albums of their own material and continued to run the label until 1978 when Ed Brown died from pancreatic cancer. The label resumed production and distribution of Copp and Brown's material on cassette and CD under the direction of Ted and Laura Leyhe in the 1990s.

== Discography ==
=== The Original LPs ===
- Jim Copp Tales (1958)
- Fable Forest (1959)
- Thimble Corner (1960)
- East of Flumdiddle (1961)
- A Fidgetty Frolic (1962)
- A Journey to San Francisco with The Glups (1963)
- Gumdrop Follies (1965)
- Schoolmates (1968)
- The Sea of Glup (1971)

All nine of the original LPs were rereleased on cassette. Jim Copp Tales, Thimble Corner, East of Flumdiddle, A Fidgetty Frolic, A Journey to San Francisco with The Glups and Schoolmates have been released in their entirety on CD.

=== CD Collections ===
- Agnes Mouthwash and Friends
- Flibbertigibbets On Parade

== See also ==
- List of record labels
