= Khadijeh Aryan =

Iranian Scholar

Vice President of Iranian Counselling Association
- Incumbent
- Assumed office 1 January 2014

Assistant Professor
- In office September 1980 – September 2012

Director General of the Bureau of International and Scientific Cooperation
- In office September 2002 – September 2004
- President: Mohammad Khatami
- Minister: Morteza Haaji

Secretary General of ISESCO
- In office September 2002 – September 2004
- President: Mohammad Khatami

Head of the Committee for Assisting Reconstruction of Afghanistan's Education
- In office September 2002 – September 2004
- President: Mohammad Khatami
- Minister: Morteza Haaji

Personal details
- Born: 11 October 1954 (age 71) Rasht, Iran
- Spouse: Mohammad Hossein Adeli
- Education: Allameh Tabatabaee University; Hofstra University; Pars College

Seyedeh Khadijeh Aryan (born 11 October 1954) is an Iranian Scholar and currently the Vice President of the Iranian Counselling Association. She was the Secretary General of ISESCO, Head of Bureau for assisting education in Afghanistan and visiting fellow in Institute of Education.

== Personal life and education ==
Khadijeh is a holder of degrees from Allameh Tabatabaee University and Hofstra University in the United States.
