= Aria, Argolis =

Municipal community

Aria Άρια
- Community
- Location within Greece
- Coordinates: 37°34′19″N 22°49′48″E
- Country: Greece
- Administrative region: Peloponnese
- Regional unit: Argolis
- Municipality: Nafplio
- Municipal unit: Nafplio

Population (2021)
  - Community: 3,529
- Time zone: UTC+2 (EET)
  - Summer (DST): UTC+3 (EEST)

Aria (Greek: Άρια) is a community in the municipality of Nafplio, Argolis, southern Greece. It consists of the villages Aria and Exostis. Its population is 3,529 (2021).
