= The Aryan School =

Coordinates: 30.3789°N 78.0761°E

- Malsi Greens; Dehradun, Uttarakhand, 248001; India

Information
- Type: International School, Boarding School, Day School
- Motto: Be a guiding star
- Founded: 2001
- Founder: Sunny Gupta
- School board: CISCE and ISC
- Principal: Mrs. B. Dasgupta
- Grades: 1-12
- Gender: Coeducational
- Student to teacher ratio: 15:1
- Campus type: Green and pollution free
- Houses: Rig, Sama, Atharva, Yajur
- Sports: Basketball, cricket, badminton, table tennis, football, lawn tennis, field hockey
- Yearbook: Sanskar

The Aryan School is a co-educational independent boarding school in Dehradun, Uttarakhand, India. Founded in 2001 by Sunny Gupta director of Wheezal Labs, "the biggest homoeopathic combinations unit in northern India". The school offers modern education based on the Vedic principle.

== Campus ==
The school campus is in the heart of the Dehradun Valley located at Malsi Green area on Mussoorie Road near to Mussoorie diversion, ten minutes from the Clock Tower. 'Smart' classrooms are in place. The school has an auditorium for functions and for movies. Dehradun is known for its weather and the school is located near a wooded hillock and the valley of Dehradun.

=== Curriculum ===
The school is affiliated by the ICSE Board, New Delhi, which conducts the ICSE (Std. 10) and ISC (Std. 12) examinations. As required by the CISCE, the subjects for ICSE and ISC examinations are taught in English.

=== Co-curricular ===
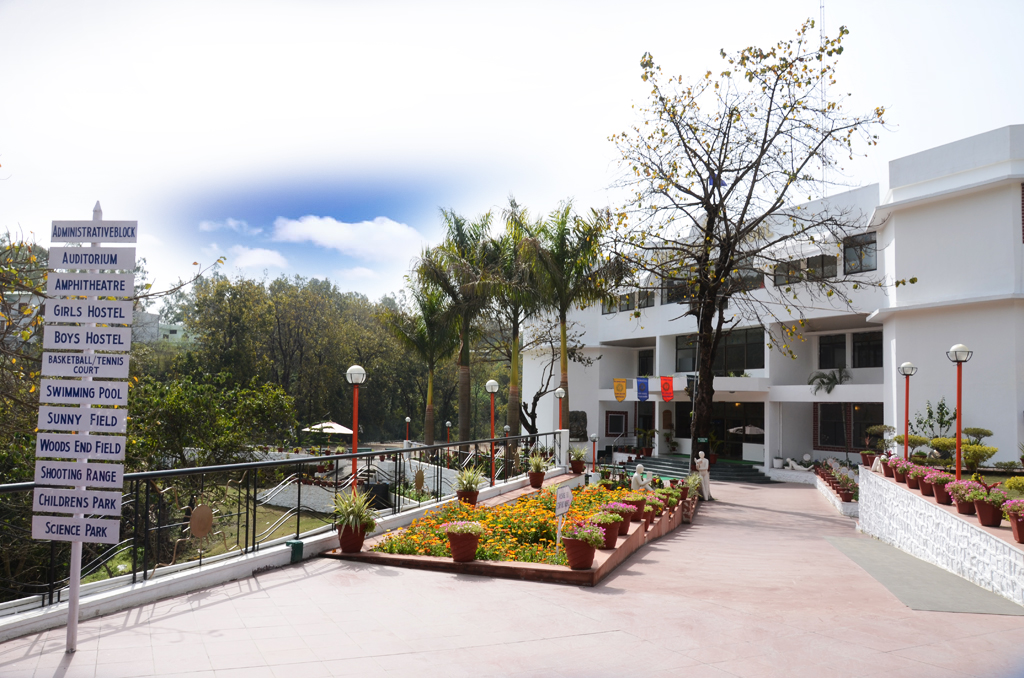
Academic building in 2011

Co-curricular activities consist of hobbies, publications, special interest clubs, community service, art and craft, clay modeling, pottery, sculpture, Indian dance and Indian and Western music.

=== Sports ===
A multi-purpose indoor stadium with a seating capacity for 200 spectators has facilities for indoor games. Cricket, football, hockey, basketball, swimming, lawn tennis, table tennis, badminton, skating, rifle-shooting, yoga and physical training are played.

=== Admission ===
The school houses 500 students aged 6 to 18. Admission to the school is based on a competitive entrance examination and an interview. The Aryan School pupils take the Indian Certificate of Secondary Education in tenth grade and are thereafter for the final two years: Indian School Certificate (ISC).

=== Houses ===
There are four houses (Rig, Sama, Atharva and Yajur named after Vedas). Each house is run by a housemaster, who is also a member of the teaching staff. The housemaster is assisted by a senior boy and girl known as the house captains. One senior boy and girl serve as school captains and is assisted by prefects from each house. Students are assigned to houses at the time of admission and develop great loyalty to them.
