= Suicide of S. Anitha =

Suicide in India

S. Anitha
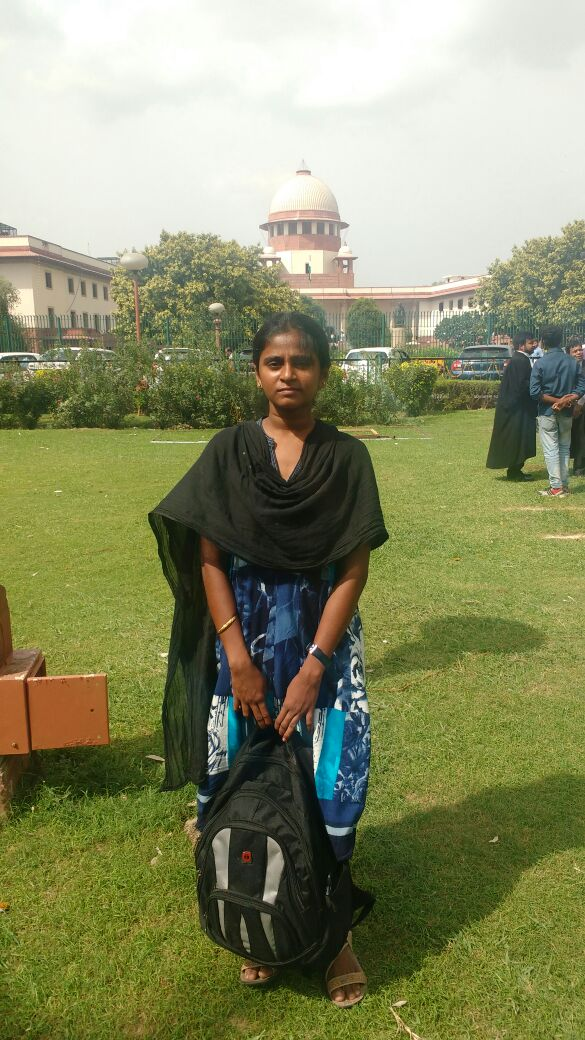
- Anitha standing in front of the Supreme Court of India
- Born: Shanmugam Anitha; 5 March 2000
- Died: 1 September 2017 (aged 17); Kuzhumur village, Ariyalur district, Tamil Nadu, India
- Cause of death: Suicide

Shanmugam Anitha (5 March 2000 – 1 September 2017) was a student from Tamil Nadu, India. She scored 1176/1200 in the 12th standard exams in the Tamil Nadu State Board. This would have secured her a medical seat, if only the State Board marks had been considered for admission. In NEET-UG 2017, Anitha secured 12.33 percentage of marks while she scored 86 out of 720 marks. The minimum eligibility cut-off for making it into the merit list was 40 percentage for students in the reserved category.

The minimum eligibility cut-off for making it into the merit list was 40 percentile ( [107 to 130] out of 720 marks ) for students in the reserved category, while it was 50 percentile for general category ( [131 to 697] out of 720 marks ). Anitha scored 12.33 percentage while admission was 14.9 for reserved and 18.2 for general categories for 2018 admission.

Admission to medical colleges is based on NEET rank calculated via percentile rather than marks.

On 1 September 2017, she died via suicide by hanging. Her death created a major controversy in Tamil Nadu where the National Eligibility and Entrance Test for medical admissions was strongly opposed. She has become a cause célèbre as a victim of the system.

== Background ==
Anitha belonged to a poor Dalit family in Kuzhumur village, Ariyalur district in rural Tamil Nadu. Anitha was the daughter of a daily wage labourer and her mother had died when she was young. She was brought up by her grandmother and lived in a house without even a toilet. She studied in a Tamil Medium school and was amongst the toppers in her district and she was the only student in Ariyalur district to score 100% marks in Physics and Mathematics in the 12th standard examination. Anitha always wanted to become a doctor. She saw that it was not possible for poor rural students to afford expensive coaching needed to prepare for NEET exams and only if medical admission selections were done based on the 12th standard marks alone would rural students be able to get seats. Anitha was unable to meet the cutoff and secure a seat through NEET. Anitha was offered an aeronautical engineering course seat at the Madras Institute of Technology but as she only wanted to be a doctor she did not take up the offer. She would have been the first from her community in her village to become a doctor.

== NEET court case ==
The Tamil Nadu government originally considered reserving 85% of the seats to Tamil Nadu State Board students. The Madras High Court dismissed it after an appeal. Later Tamil Nadu government had also promised exemption from National Eligibility and Entrance Test for one year. However the Supreme Court of India dismissed Tamil Nadu government's plea after the central government refused to support Tamil Nadu's ordinance seeking exemption from NEET for one year.

Anitha implead herself in the petition in the Supreme Court against NEET claiming it was against the interests of rural students after a case was filed by Central Board of Secondary Education students represented by senior advocate Nalini Chidambaram, wife of P. Chidambaram, who argued that admissions should be made only on basis of NEET. After the Supreme Court of India verdict which stated that admissions should be made only based on NEET, Nalini Chidambaram stated, "Any further appeal against NEET can only be done to God," and that the Tamil Nadu government could no longer do anything for State Board students after the Supreme Court verdict.

Anitha died by suicide nine days after the verdict.

== Protest ==
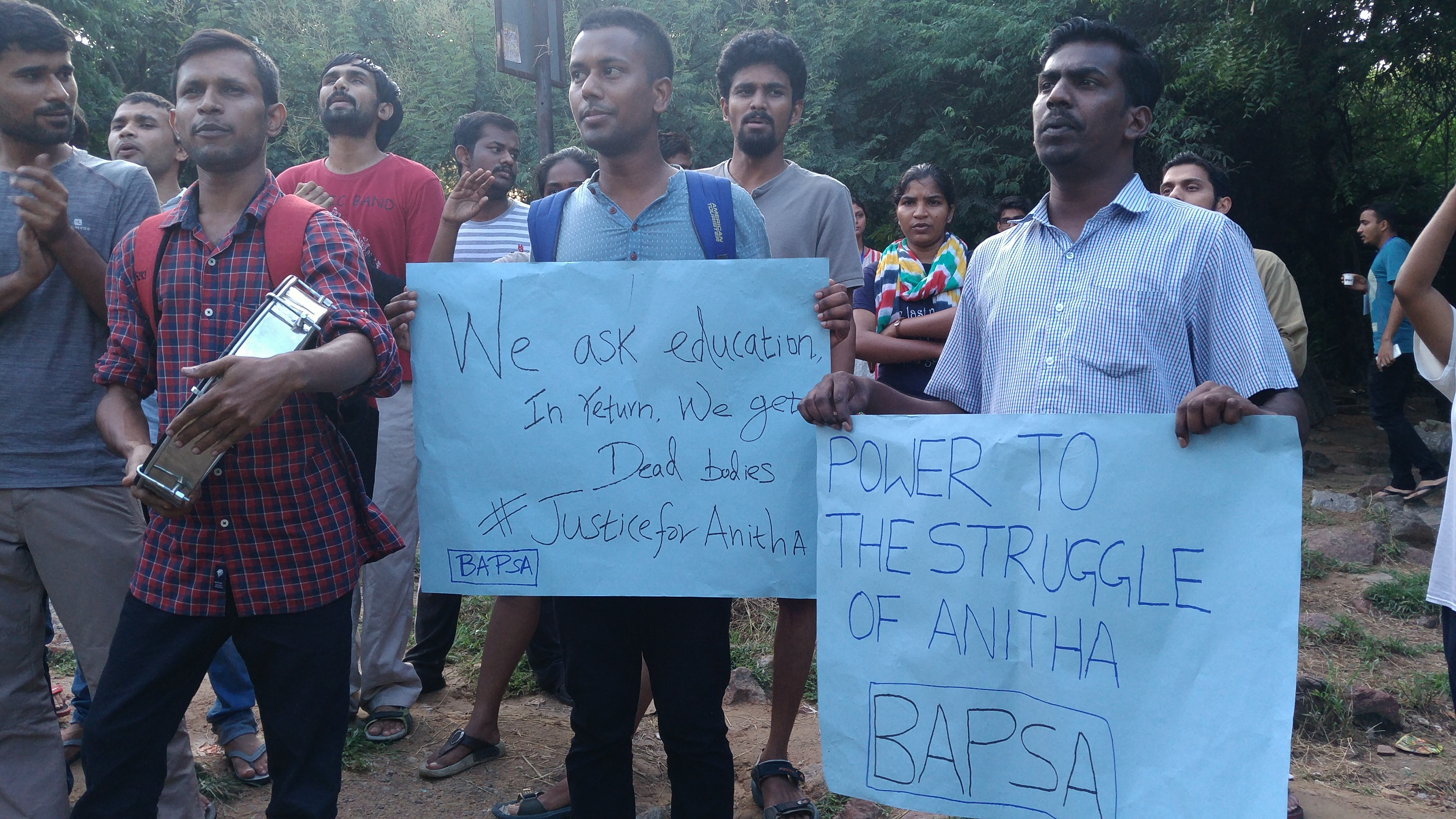
#JusticeForAnitha protests at Jawaharlal Nehru University, New Delhi

Her suicide led to protests all over Tamil Nadu against NEET after her death. Anitha's family refused Tamil Nadu government's compensation offer. The large scale protests led to the Supreme Court of India to ask the Tamil Nadu Government to control the protests.

The BJP claimed that her suicide is a political conspiracy against the BJP. BJP President Tamilisai Soundarajan has warned protesters across the state against testing the BJP's tolerance.

== Reaction to her death ==
Director Pa. Ranjith who attended her funeral stated

"even after acquiring very good marks in class 10 and class 12 her dreams were shattered as more harsh weapons like NEET were being created. The main objective seems to be like curb the entry of the downtrodden into institutions just like IIT."

M.K.Stalin stated

"the cruelty of NEET had been explained by the death of Anitha, whose dream of becoming a doctor was killed and all her efforts over two years in higher secondary schooling allowed to go to waste."

T.T.V. Dhinakaran stated that

“Anitha had faith in the promise of the government but committed suicide because she could not tolerate the betrayal. If Amma (Jayalalithaa) was alive, she would have saved the State from the injustice of the NEET.”

Bharatiya Janata Party's L. Murugan said that there was some external force behind her suicide and further said that Neet is required and urged the state government to prepare students to compete at national and international level.
