= Arria NLG =

New Zealand company

Arria NLG plc
- Company type: Public
- Traded as: AIM: NLG
- Industry: Technology; Software
- Founded: 2009
- Founder: Ehud Reiter; Yaji Sripada; Ian Davy; John Perry; Ross Turner
- Headquarters: Morristown, NJ, USA
- Products: Arria NLG Engine: software and applications
- Website: arria.com

Arria NLG plc is a New Zealand-based company with headquarters in the US. Arria offers artificial intelligence technology in data analytics and information delivery. It is one of the companies in the space of automatic text generation, with a focus on Natural Language Generation (NLG). When it floated on London's Alternative Investment Market (AIM) in December 2013, it was valued at over £160 million. However, Arria was later delisted from the stock exchange. Subsequently, Arria has raised over US$100 million from private sources. Arria's technology is based on three decades of scientific research in the field of Natural Language Generation (NLG).

== History ==
The company was founded in 2009 under the name Data2Text Ltd. by Arria's Chief Scientist Professor Ehud Reiter, Senior Lecturer Dr Yaji Sripada, and post-doctoral researcher Dr Ross Turner from the NLG research group at the University of Aberdeen, and meteorologist/entrepreneur Ian Davy. In May 2012, Data2Text joined forces with a specialist software development and marketing firm, Arria NLG (then a limited company), which took a 20% stake in Data2Text. In late 2013, Arria NLG acquired the remaining 80% of Data2Text, and in December 2013 Arria NLG converted to a public listed company and was floated on the AIM. In September 2018, Arria shareholders approved a scheme of arrangement that placed a New Zealand holding company (Arria NLG Ltd.) over the original Arria UK company and its direct subsidiary, now known as Arria Data2Text Ltd. In late 2018 Arria located its global headquarters in Morristown, New Jersey, and now maintains offices in New Zealand, Scotland, Australia, and British Columbia, Canada.

== Technology/Science ==
Arria's NLG Engine uses pattern recognition to distill the information from its input data into human-readable text. It consists of two components:

- The analysis and interpretation component takes raw transactional or sensor data and turns it into information using rules based on the knowledge of a domain expert.
- The NLG component communicates this information in natural language, based on general linguistic rules, using industry-specific terminology

Arria NLG's capabilities are rooted in the scientific research conducted since the 1980s by its founder and Chief Scientist, Professor Ehud Reiter, and former Chief Technology Officer Dr Robert Dale.

Arria has been awarded over 40 US patents in the NLG field.

== Applications ==
Data2Text Ltd. focused on the automatic conversion of meteorological data and data from oil and gas platforms into natural language reports. The group is also developing applications providing automatic analysis and reporting capabilities for fraud detection, risk mitigation and compliance to the banking industry.

== See also ==
- Natural language generation
- Natural language processing
- Natural language understanding
- Computational linguistics
- Computational Linguistics (journal)
- Analytics
- Big data
- Data analysis
