= Praskovia Arian =

Russian writer, translator, feminist and educator (c. 1864–1949)

Praskovia Naumovna Belenkaia Arian
- Born: 12 April 1864 or 1865; St. Petersburg, Russian Empire
- Died: 28 March 1949; Moscow, Soviet Union
- Occupations: Columnist, editor, publisher, educator
- Writing career
- Pen name: "Ar." (Russian: Ар.)
- Period: 1884–1930s
- Subjects: Women's rights and education
- Notable work: First Women's Calendar

Praskovia Naumovna Arian (Russian: Прасковья Наумовна Ариян (Ариан)), née Belenkaia, (Russian: Беленькая; c. 1864 – 28 March 1949) was a Russian writer, translator, feminist and educator. She founded the annual First Women's Calendar (Pervyi Zhenskii Kalendar − Russian: Первый женский календарь) covering women's issues in Russia and later the First Women’s Technical Institute (Pervyi Zhenskii Politekhnicheskii Institut − Russian: Первый женский политехнический институт). She wrote articles under the pseudonym "Ar." (Russian: Ар.). In the 1930s she taught courses for workers at the Kirov Plant in Leningrad.

== Life ==
Arian was born to Jewish parents in either 1864 or 1865 in St. Petersburg, the capital of the Russian Empire. While a student in the physics and mathematics section of the St Petersburg Bestuzhev Higher Women’s Courses (Vysshie Zhenskie (Bestuzhevskie) Kursy), Arian became radicalized. She completed her coursework, but failed to take her final exams. The date of her marriage to process engineer Miron Isaevich Arian (Russian: Мирон Исаевич Ариян) is unknown.

== Work ==
Arian was a translator and journalist, writing for a variety of publications including Stock Market Gazette (Birzhevye Vedomosti – Russian: Биржевые ведомости) and Art and Life (Iskusstvo i Zhizn’), to name just two. She founded a daycare center for workers in St. Petersburg in 1884 and worked there for the next decade. In 1889, she founded the First Women's Calendar covering a wide range of issues of interest to women, including coverage of the major feminist organization and their congresses. Published annually until 1915, Arian was the publisher, editor and compiler of the Calendar. The writer Maxim Gorky, the radical activist Vera Figner, the artist Ilia Repin and the psychologist Vladimir Bekhterev all contributed to the Calendar.

=== First Women's Calendar ===
- 1899 year / Первый женский календарь / Сост. П.Н. Ариян... - Санкт-Петербург : паровая скоропеч. "Труд", 1899-1915. - 20. ... на 1899 год. - 1899. - 12, XL, 186 с., 3 л. ил.
- 1900 year / Первый женский календарь / Сост. П.Н. Ариян... - Санкт-Петербург : паровая скоропеч. "Труд", 1899-1915. - 20. ... на 1900 год : Год 2-й. - Санкт-Петербург : тип. Спб. т-ва печ. и изд. дела "Труд", 1900. - XVI, 433 с.
- 1901 year / Первый женский календарь / Сост. П.Н. Ариян... - Санкт-Петербург : паровая скоропеч. "Труд", 1899-1915. - 20. ... на 1901 год : Год 3-й. - Санкт-Петербург : типо-лит. И. Лурье и К°, 1901. - XII, 476 с., 7 л. портр.
- 1902 year / Первый женский календарь / Сост. П.Н. Ариян... - Санкт-Петербург : паровая скоропеч. "Труд", 1899-1915. - 20. ... на 1902 год : Год 4-й / Медицинский отдел под ред. проф. Н.И. Быстрова. - Санкт-Петербург : тип. Спб. общ. печ. дела в России Е. Евдокимов, 1902. - XVI, 490 с., 7 л. портр. : ил.
- 1903 year / Первый женский календарь / Сост. П.Н. Ариян... - Санкт-Петербург : паровая скоропеч. "Труд", 1899-1915. - 20. ... на 1903 год : Год 5-й / Медицинский отдел под ред. проф. Н.И. Быстрова. - Санкт-Петербург : Г. Гоппе, 1903. - (2), XVIII, 546 с., 11 л. портр
- 1904 year / Первый женский календарь / Сост. П.Н. Ариян... - Санкт-Петербург : паровая скоропеч. "Труд", 1899-1915. - 20. ... на 1904 год : Год 6-й / Медицинский отдел под ред. проф. Н.И. Быстрова. - Санкт-Петербург : т-во печ. и изд. дела "Нар. польза", 1904. - 20, 514 с., 22 л. ил.
- 1905 year / Первый женский календарь / Сост. П.Н. Ариян... - Санкт-Петербург : паровая скоропеч. "Труд", 1899-1915. - 20. ... на 1905 год : Год 7-й / Медицинский отдел под ред. проф. Н.И. Быстрова. - Санкт-Петербург : т-во печ. и изд. дела "Нар. польза", 1905. - 2, XVI, 482 с., 17 л. ил.
- 1906 year / Первый женский календарь / Сост. П.Н. Ариян... - Санкт-Петербург : паровая скоропеч. "Труд", 1899-1915. - 20. ... на 1906 год : Год 8-й. - 1906. - (1), XXV, 399 с., 8 л. портр.
- 1907 year / Первый женский календарь / Сост. П.Н. Ариян... - Санкт-Петербург : паровая скоропеч. "Труд", 1899-1915. - 20. ... на 1907 год : Год 9-й : Медицинский отдел со статьями врачей: Н.В. Печковской, М.И. Покровской, А.М. Поповой и др.. Отдел "Из прошлого и настоящего" со статьями Л.Я. Гуревич, С.А. Ивановой, М.А. Маргулиес и др. - Санкт-Петербург : тип. В.Ф. Ревитцера, 1907. - XXII, 430 с., 17 л. порт.
- 1908 year / Первый женский календарь / Сост. П.Н. Ариян... - Санкт-Петербург : паровая скоропеч. "Труд", 1899-1915. - 20. ... на 1908 год : Год 10-й : Отдел "Из прошлого и настоящего" со статьями Н.А. Морозова, Веры Ник. Фигнер, Н.Е. Кудрина. Медицинский отдел со статьями врачей: П.В. Печковской, А.М. Поповой и Б.М. Шапиро. - Санкт-Петербург : тип. В.Ф. Ревитцера, 1908. - XVI, 320, 48 с., 1 л. ил.
- 1909 year / Первый женский календарь / Сост. П.Н. Ариян... - Санкт-Петербург : паровая скоропеч. "Труд", 1899-1915. - 20. ... на 1909 год : Год 11-й : Отдел "Из прошлого и настоящего" со статьями А.Е. Кауфмана, Н.Е. Кудрина, А.В. Лучинской и др. Медицинский отдел со статьями врачей: В.А. Волькенштейн, О.Ю. Каминской, Н.В. Печковской и др. - Санкт-Петербург : тип. т-ва "Обществ. польза", 1909. - 286, 166, XXXIV с. : ил.
- 1910 year / Первый женский календарь / Сост. П.Н. Ариян... - Санкт-Петербург : паровая скоропеч. "Труд", 1899-1915. - 20. ... на 1910 год : XII год / При участии акад. В.М. Бехтерева, М.М. Волковой, Н.Е. Кудрина и др.. - Санкт-Петербург : тип. М.Я. Квара, 1910. - 447 с. разд. паг., 4 л. ил. : ил.
- 1911 year / Первый женский календарь / [Сост.] П.Н. Ариян... - Санкт-Петербург : паровая скоропеч. "Труд", [1899]-[1915]. - 20. ... на 1911 год : XIII год / При участии акад. В.М. Бехтерева, М. Горького, А.Я. Ефименко [и др.]. - Санкт-Петербург : тип. "Север", [1911]. - [2], VIII, 7-146, 291 с., 2 л. ил.
- 1912 year / Первый женский календарь / [Сост.] П.Н. Ариян... - Санкт-Петербург : паровая скоропеч. "Труд", [1899]-[1915]. - 20. ... на 1912 год : XIV г. : Со статьями женщ.-врачей М.М. Волковой и С.С. Вольтке, проф. Дегена [и др.]. - [Санкт-Петербург : 1-я женск. тип. т-ва "Печатного станка", [1912]. - 418 с. разд. паг., 5 л. портр.
- 1913 year / Первый женский календарь / Сост. П.Н. Ариян... - Санкт-Петербург : паровая скоропеч. "Труд", - 20. ... на 1913 год : XV г. - Санкт-Петербург : тип. "Бережливость", 1913. - 442 с. разд. паг., 8 л. портр.
- 1914 year / Первый женский календарь / [Сост.] П.Н. Ариян... - Санкт-Петербург : паровая скоропеч. "Труд", 1899-1915. - 20. ... на 1914 год : XVI г. - Санкт-Петербург : тип. "Бережливость", [1914]. - XXXVIII, 380 с., 6 л. портр.
- 1915 year / Первый женский календарь / [Сост.] П.Н. Ариян... - Санкт-Петербург : паровая скоропеч. "Труд", [1899]-[1915]. - 20. ... на 1915 год : XVII г. Петроград : тип. "Я. Трей", [1915]. - [8], 168 с. : ил.

=== Translations ===
- Вотель, Клеман. «Я - заядлый буржуй» (French: «Je suis un affreux bourgeois»): Роман / Клеман Вотель; Пер. с франц. П. Н. Ариян. - Ленинград : Книжные новинки, [1926]. - 218, [2] с.;
- Маргерит, Виктор. «Молодые девушки» (French: «Jeunes Filles»): Роман / Виктор Маргерит; Пер. с франц. П. Н. Ариян. - Ленинград; Москва : Петроград, [1927]. - 173 с.;
- Шеро, Гастон. «Капризы судьбы» = «Le Vent du destin» : [Рассказы] / Гастон Шеро; Пер. с франц. П. Ариян, В. Нибиэри. - Ленинград; Москва : Книга, [1927] (М. : тип. М.К.Х. им. Ф. Я. Лаврова). - 111 с.;
