= Arya (name) =

- Gender: Neutral

Origin
- Origin: Sanskrit, Old Iranian
- Meaning: "Noble one"

Other names
- See also: Aria, Aryan, Ariana

Arya, also spelled Aarya, Aariya or Ariya (Sanskrit: आर्य/आर्या ārya/āryā; Old Persian: 𐎠𐎼𐎡𐎹 Persian: آریا ariya) is a name of Indo-Iranian origin. It traces back to the ethnonym and endonym Arya, used by the Indo-Iranians to identify themselves. In both Sanskrit and Avestan, Arya refers to those viewed as a part of a civilized or morally distinguished group, contrasting with non-Aryans. The term appears in ancient religious and historical texts, representing ideals of nobility and virtue. In the Indian subcontinent, the Sanskrit name 'Arya' is used as both a surname and a given name, with the given name appearing in masculine (आर्य ārya) and feminine (आर्या āryā) forms.

The personal name Arya is derived from the Sanskrit term ārya (आर्य), which in Vedic and Classical Sanskrit meant “noble”, “honourable”, or “freeman”, and is first attested in ancient Indian texts. The name is widely used in India and Iran, where it carries connotations of an ancient lineage of rich heritage and cultural values.

The name Arya can also be found in countries that carry significant influence by Indian culture and India from where the name originates. For instance, in Indonesia, Arya is commonly used as a masculine given name, particularly in Java and Bali. In Javanese, the name takes variations in the forms of Aryo, Ario, and Aryono. In another Indian-influenced country of Cambodia, Arya is more often given to girls. It is a common name among Hindus.

== Modern usage ==
The 2011 television series Game of Thrones features a character named Arya Stark, increasing the name's popularity among Western audiences. In 2013, BBC News wrote that "the passion and the extreme devotion of fans" had brought about a phenomenon unlike anything related to other popular TV series, manifesting itself in a very broad range of fan labor, such as fan fiction, Game of Thrones-themed burlesque routines, or people naming their children after characters from the series. In 2012, Arya was the fastest-rising girl's name in popularity in the United States, jumping from 711th to 413th position.

It peaked in popularity in the United States in 2019, when it was the 92nd most popular name for newborn girls. It fell to 120th position on the U.S. popularity chart in 2021. The name entered the top 200 most commonly used names for girls born in England and Wales in 2017.

== People with the name ==
=== India ===
==== Mononym ====
- Arya (actor) (born 1980), south Indian actor
- Arya (actress), Indian actress (Arya Babu, stage name Arya Badai)

==== Given name ====
- Aarya Ambekar (born 1994), Marathi playback singer
- Aarya Babbar (born 1981), Indian actor
- Arya Bhatta (476–550), Indian mathematician
- Arya Gopi, Indian Malayalam-language poet
- Arya Rohit, Indian actress
- Arya Yousefi (born 2002), Iranian footballer

==== Surname ====
- A. S. Arya, Indian structural engineer
- Aditi Arya, Indian model
- Anita Arya, Indian politician from the BJP
- Chandra Arya, Canadian-Indian politician
- Chaudhari Kumbharam Arya, Indian freedom fighter and leader
- Ishan Arya, Indian cinematographer and producer
- Priyansh Arya, Indian Premier League cricket player and opening batsman.
- Ritu Arya, English-Indian actress
- Satyadeo Narain Arya, Indian politician from Bihar
- Shraddha Arya, Indian actress from the Telugu film industry
- Shubhavi Arya, Indian animator
- S. N. Arya, Indian physician and writer
- S. P. Y. Surendranath Arya, Indian independence activist
- Yashpal Arya, Indian politician from the National Congress

=== Indonesia ===
- Arya Penangsang, Sultan of Demak (1549–1554)
- Ario Soerjo (1898–1948), murdered Indonesian politician
- Arya Maulana Aldiartama (born 1995), Indonesian badminton player
- I Ngurah Komang Arya (born 1985), Indonesian footballer
- Aryo Danusiri, Indonesian film director
- Aryo Djojohadikusumo, Indonesian politician
- Bima Arya (born 1972), Indonesian politician

=== Iran ===
- Aryo Barzan (368–330 BCE), Achaemenid prince
- Aryandes, satrap of Persian Egypt
- Ariamnes, satrap of Cappadocia
- Ariyāramna, a minor king in pre-imperial Persia (Pars region) and great-grandfather of Darius I
- Ariobarzanes I of Media Atropatene, ruled from 65 BC to 56 BC
- Ariobarzanes II of Atropatene, grandson of Ariobarzanes I, king of Media Atropatene from 20 BC to 8 BC
- Ariobarzanes I of Cappadocia, king of Cappadocia from 93 BC to ca. 63 or 62 BC
- Akram Monfared Arya (born 1946), first Iranian female pilot
- Fatemeh Motamed-Arya (born 1961), Iranian actress
- Arya Aramnejad (born 1983), Iranian singer
- Arya Aziminejad (born 1973), Iranian composer
- Arya Nasimi-Shad (born 1999), Iranian swimmer
- Ariya Daivari (born 1989), Iranian-American professional wrestler

=== Other countries ===
- Gabriel Arya (fl. late 7th century), also called Gabriel Qaṭraya, biblical exegete who wrote in Syriac.
- Arya Mitra Sharma (born 1959), German doctor

== Fictional characters ==
- Arya Stark, in A Song of Ice and Fire book series and TV adaptation Game of Thrones
