= Ghamar Ariyan =

Iranian writer, translator and essayist (1922–2012)

Ghamar Ariyan قمر آریان
- Born: 22 March 1922; Quchan, Iran
- Died: 11 April 2012; Tehran, Iran
- Known for: Researcher, author
- Spouse: Abdolhosein Zarrinkoub

Ghamar Ariyan (Persian: قمر آریان; 22 March 1922 – 11 April 2012) was an Iranian researcher and author. Mirza Abdolvahhab Aryan, her father, was an intellectual and a powerful figure in the city. He decided to create the first girls' school in Quchan after the birth of his daughter. The school was operated by literate and elite local women who taught the first six grades. Ghamar finished sixth grade there, and her father hired a private instructor to continue her education for another three years because she was exceptionally bright. She subsequently went to an elementary teachers' college in Mashhad for her tenth and eleventh grades, while concurrently teaching sixth grade at a primary school.

On obtaining her bachelor's degree, Aryan decided to remain in Tehran and would eventually pursue a PhD. She was the first woman to graduate from the Faculty of Literature at Tehran University. Aryan learned about Christian religious teachings at university through her History of Religions classes, and after reading the New Testament, despite having already studied the life and works of Rumi and his contemporaries, she decided to write her PhD thesis on The Face of Christianity in Persian Literature.

She became the first female university professor in Iran and a member of the Supreme Council of the Great Islamic Encyclopedia. She married Abdolhossein Zarinkoob in 1953, the same year they both acquired their PhDs. They had been married for more than 50 years. Despite the fact that they had no children, their marriage produced a number of important academic works, including Zarinkoub's The History of Iran, Two Centuries of Silence, Times, and so on, and Aryan's Woman in the Koran and Kamaledin Behzad, as well as numerous co-authored works such as Ney Nameh (Epistle of the Shepherd Pipe) and Iran: Country of Culture and Art.

In the ninth decade of her life, she created works of lasting cultural, social and political standing. She participated in the Congress of Orientalists in India, met Nima Youshij and attended the trial of Mohammad Mosaddegh, Prime Minister of the national government after the coup of 28 August.
