= Aria Tesolin =

Canadian child singer

Aria Tesolin (born August 20, 1993, in Mississauga, Ontario) is a Canadian mezzo-soprano, pop classical, classical crossover and contemporary pop singer, songwriter and poet known for her operatic vocals and genre defying original style of classically infused pop music.

== Biography ==
As a child singer, Tesolin began singing opera arias in concert with Canada's 3 Tenors at the age of eight, singing the "Habanera" from Bizet's opera Carmen, the brindisi "Libiamo ne' lieti calici" from Verdis's opera La traviata, "Belle nuit" from Offenbach's The Tales of Hoffmann, "Largo al factotum", the famous baritone aria from Rossini's The Barber of Seville and "O mio babbino caro" from Puccini's Gianni Schicchi, and "Nessun dorma" from Puccini's Turandot. Tesolin's first live concert performance on August 3, 2002, was featured on Citytv News. Many members of the astonished audience were seen on camera with mouths visibly agape with surprise. At the age of 12, Tesolin recorded and released her debut opera album Baby Soprano, featuring 14 popular opera arias. Nine tracks from Baby Soprano, "Habanera", "Libiamo", "Vedrai Carino", "Un bel di", "Mattinata", "Largo al factotum", "Ebben? Ne andrò lontana", "Una furtiva lagrima", and "Belle nuit", have appeared on iTunes opera charts in 13 countries, Italy, Luxembourg, France, Netherlands, Germany, Portugal, Mexico, Japan, Canada, Greece, Australia, Belgium and Norway.

Tesolin appeared on CTV News Toronto and on Success Stories on CTV National with Sandie Rinaldo CTV News and on the Italian show Noi Oggi on OMNI Television. Tesolin opened Canada Day celebrations for the city of Toronto on July 1, 2003, and July 1, 2006. Both events were attended by up to 20,000 people. Tesolin become known as the youngest opera singer in the world.

In June 2007 Tesolin appeared on a CityTV News special feature on Canada's new Four Seasons Centre. On December 16, 2007, Tesolin sang with The Canadian Tenors at their Christmas Concert at the Oakville Centre for the Performing Arts. On March 30, 2008, Tesolin appeared on the TLN Telelatino National TV Show Viva Domenica singing "Un bel di" from Puccini's opera Madama Butterfly. In March 2009, Tesolin appeared on stage as the shepherd boy in Opera York's production of Tosca. On September 1, 2010, Tesolin released her first single as a singer-songwriter, a contemporary crooner song called "Now That I Know". On February 1, 2011, Tesolin's pop-classical single love song "Dolce" was released. On November 6, 2011, Tesolin's self-titled 3-track EP featuring "Dolce", "The Key", and "Now That I Know" was released. On April 9, 2013, the album Ascension was released featuring original music in a pop classical, contemporary pop and electronic music fusion style.

== Radio ==
"Dolce" was released to international radio and in March 2012 appeared on the Official European Indie Chart, playing on 700 radio stations across Europe. "The Key" was released to US radio in April 2013 and on June 19, 2013, with no previous chart history, became the highest debuting single on both Top 40 and AC charts published by New Music Weekly. By September 8, 2013 "The Key" had reached #5 on the Hot 100 Singles Chart with 1595 spins per week on US commercial radio, #8 on the AC Chart and #9 on the Top 40 chart, #1 on the Top 30 Indie Chart for Top 40, #2 on the Top 30 Indie Chart for AC.

== Discography ==
Title	Release date
Baby Soprano	May 2006 TRACK LIST; 1. Libiamo duet - Libiamo ne' lieti calici (La Traviata, Verdi); 2. Habanera (Carmen by Bizet); 3. La Donna e Mobile (Rigoletto by Verdi); 4. Barcarolle/Belle Nuit (Tales of Hoffmann, Offenbach); 5 Ebbene Ne'Andro Lontana (La Wally, Catalani); 6. O Mio Babbino Caro (Gianni Schicchi, Puccini); 7. Largo al factotum (Barbiere di Seville, Rossini); 8. Vissi D'Arte (Tosca, Puccini); 9. Vedrai Carino (Don Giovanni, Mozart); 10. Quando M'En Vo (La Bohème, Puccini); 11. Nessun Dorma (Turandot, Puccini); 12. Una Furtiva Lagrima (Elisir D'Amore, Donizetti); 13. Un Bel Di Vedremo (Madama Butterfly, Puccini); 14. Mattinata (Ruggiero Leoncavallo)
Aria Tesolin - EP	November 2011 TRACK LIST; 1. Dolce; 2. The Key; 3. Now That I Know Tracks 1 & 2 Produced by Douglas Romanow; Track 3 Produced by Charles DiRaimondo; Copyright by Aria Tesolin 2011
Ascension	April 2013 TRACK LIST; 1. My Heart is a Factory; 2. The Catch (Clarabella); 3. Ascension; 4. Hear Me; 5. The Key; 6. Nobody Knows; 7. I'm Already Gone; 8. Dolce; 9. The Apology; 10. In a Dream Produced by Douglas Romanow Copyright Aria Tesolin 2013, Lucid Records

== Awards ==
On January 27, 2014, Tesolin was nominated for three 2014 New Music Awards by New Music Weekly, Best New Top 40 Artist of the Year, Top 40 Breakthrough Artist of the Year, AC Breakthrough Artist of the Year.
