= Asher Arian =

American political scientist (1938–2010)

Asher Arian (Hebrew: אשר אריאן; August 4, 1938 – July 7, 2010) was an American and Israeli political scientist who was an expert on Israeli politics and election studies, and who served as a professor at universities in Israel and the United States.

== Biography ==
Arian was born in Cleveland, Ohio in 1938, and graduated from John Adams High School. He completed a Bachelor of Arts degree in 1961 at Case Western Reserve University, and a PhD in political science at Michigan State University in 1965.

Arian moved to Israel in 1966, and founded the Department of Political Science at Tel Aviv University, working there until 1989. From 1986, he divided his time between the United States and Israel. He was a professor at the Graduate Center of the City University of New York from 1986, and at the University of Haifa from 1990 to 2006. Arian served as chair of the Israel Political Science Association, and received its Lifetime Achievement Award in 2005.

Arian's published works included Politics in Israel: The Second Generation (1985), National Security and Public Opinion in Israel (1988) (co-author), Changing New York City Politics (1991), Security Threatened: Surveying Israeli Opinion on Peace and War (1995), Second Republic: Politics in Israel (1998, 2005), and Executive Governance in Israel (2002) (co-author). He also edited a long-running series of books on elections in Israel, with volumes covering the elections of 1969, 1973, 1977, 1981, 1984, 1988, 1992, 1996, 1999, 2003, 2006, and 2009.
