= Arian Hametaj =

Albanian footballer

Personal information
- Date of birth: 1 July 1957 (age 69)
- Place of birth: , Albania
- Position: Defender

Senior career*
Years	Team	Apps	(Gls)
1979–1989	Partizani Tirana		

International career
1982–1985	Albania	10	(0)
- * Club domestic league appearances and goals

Arian Hametaj (born 1 July 1957) is an Albanian retired footballer, who played as a defender for Partizani Tirana football club.

== Club career ==
Normal as it was in communist Albania, Hametaj only played for one club: Partizani. He won the 1986/87 league title with them, alongside fellow international players Adnan Ocelli, Lefter Millo and Sokol Kushta.

== International career ==
He made his debut for Albania in a September 1982 European Championship qualification match against Austria in Vienna and earned a total of 10 caps, scoring no goals.

His final international was a March 1985 friendly match against Turkey.

== Honours ==
- Albanian Superliga: 1

1987
