= Keren Terner Eyal =

Israeli civil servant and businesswoman

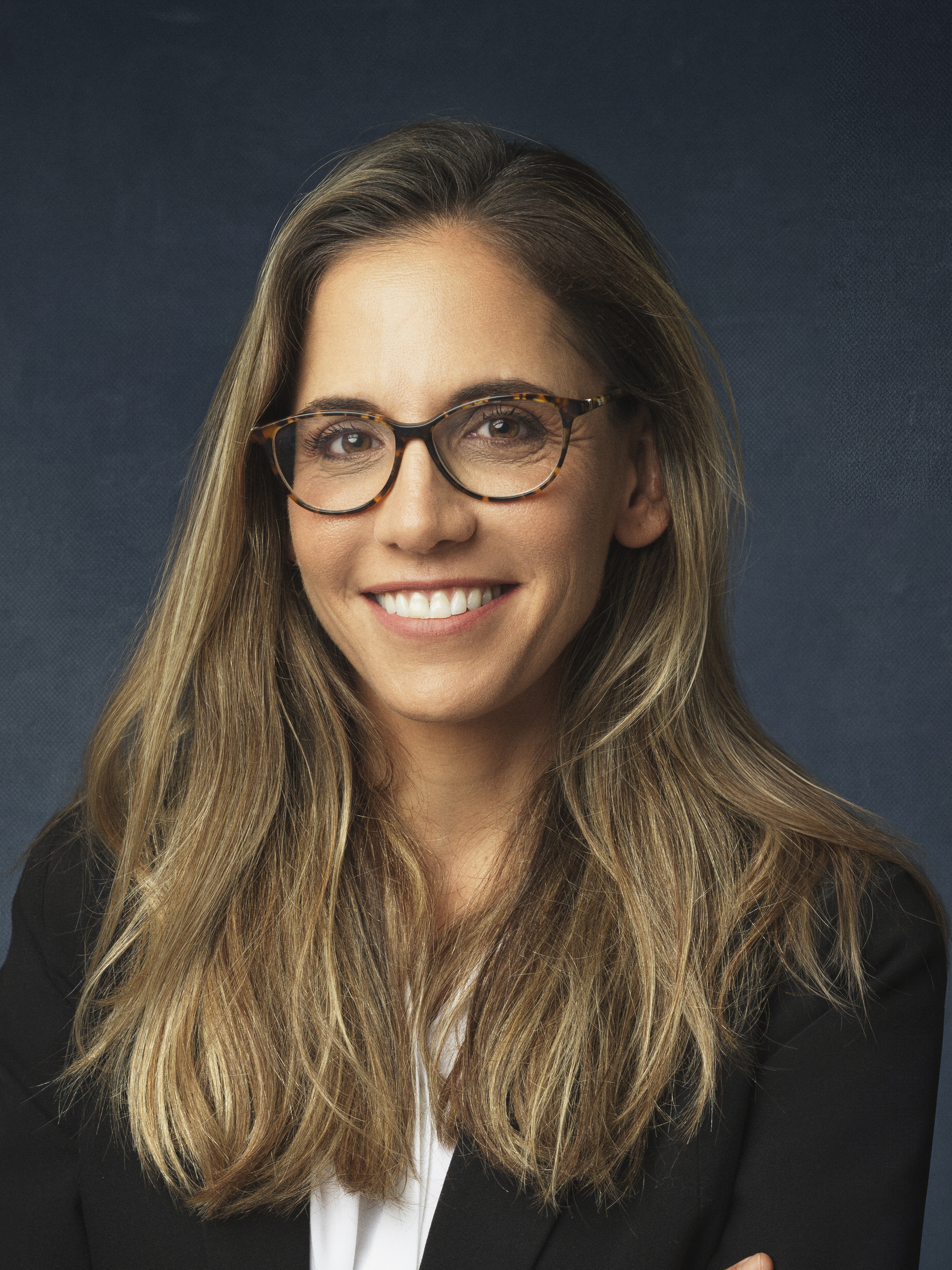
- Terner Eyal in 2026

Faction represented in the Knesset
- 2026–: Together

Other roles
- 2016–2020: Director-General of the Ministry of Transport
- 2020: Director-General of the Ministry of Finance

Personal details
- Born: 3 May 1979 (age 47) Hadera, Israel
- Party: Bennett 2026 (since 2026)
- Children: 3
- Education: Hebrew University of Jerusalem
- Occupation: Civil servant; Businesswoman; Politician

Keren Terner Eyal (Hebrew: קרן טרנר אייל; born 3 May 1979), also rendered Keren Terner-Eyal, Keren Terner or Keren Turner Eyal, is an Israeli civil servant, businesswoman and politician who serves as an MK for Together since 2026.

== Early life and education ==
Turner grew up in moshav Hadar Am. She has a Bachelor's degree in economics, as well as a Master's degree in Business Management, both from the Hebrew University of Jerusalem.

== Public sector ==
=== Director-General of the Ministry of Finance ===
In 2011, Terner was appointed deputy director of the Ministry of Transportation by then-minister Israel Katz. The following year, she was appointed the ministry's first female director, following the retirement of her predecessor. Terner served under ministers Israel Katz and Bezalel Smotrich.

== Private sector ==
In 2021, Terner was appointed to serve on the board of directors of real estate company Amot, and joined Israeli venture capital fund Vintage.

== Politics ==
Terner and Liran Avishar Ben-Horin were announced in April 2026 by Naftali Bennett as the first additions to his Bennett 2026 slate.

Terner was elected to the Knesset in the 2026 Israeli legislative election in the third slot of the Together alliance's electoral list.
