= Bennett 2026 =

Israeli political party

Bennett 2026 בנט 2026
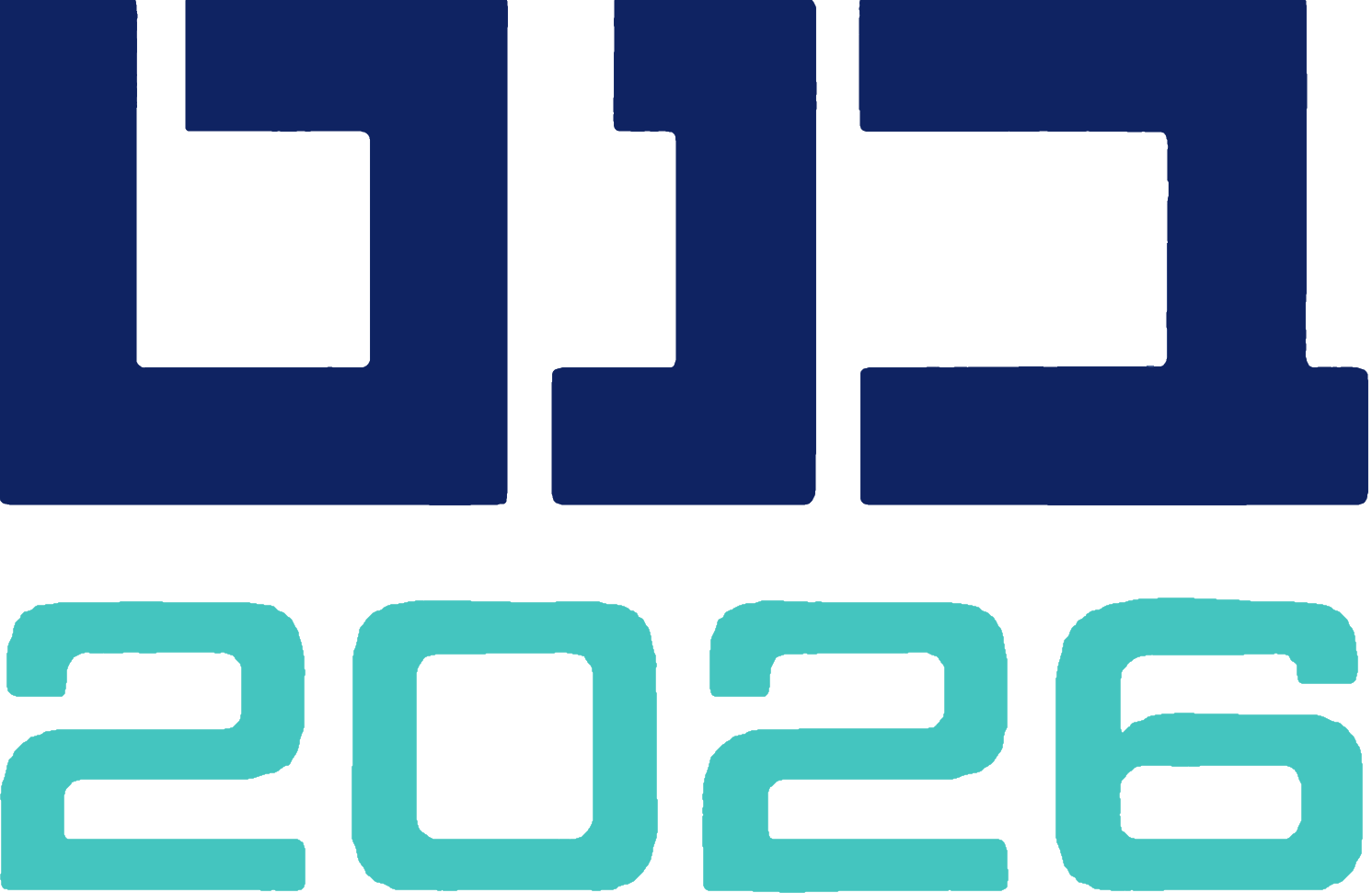
- Leader: Naftali Bennett
- Founder: Naftali Bennett; Gilat Bennett; Liran Avishar Ben-Horin; Gadi Lesin; Bruria Naim Arman; Giora Levi; Ofer Ogash; Nir Novak
- Founded: 1 April 2025
- Preceded by: New Right; Yamina
- Ideology: Zionism; Economic liberalism; Constitutionalism; Technocracy
- Political position: Right-wing
- National affiliation: Together
- Knesset: 7 / 120

Website
- bennett2026.org.il

Bennett 2026 (Hebrew: בנט 2026) is an Israeli political party formed in 2025 by Naftali Bennett, former prime minister of Israel. The party and Yesh Atid formed an alliance, called Together, in April 2026, ahead of the 2026 Israeli legislative election, with Bennett 2026 winning seven seats.

== Background ==
Bennett served as prime minister from June 2021 until June 2022 as the head of the thirty-sixth government of Israel, which was a broad unity government that included "centrist and left-wing parties", in addition to an Arab-Israeli party.

There had been reports in mid-2024 of Bennett's imminent political return; Gideon Sa'ar had stated in early July 2024 that Bennett intends to returns to politics, while Bennett and Yisrael Beiteinu leader Avigdor Lieberman met that same month.

According to opinion polls in late March 2025, Bennett's party would be the largest in an election.

Bennett registered a new party under the name Bennett 2026 in April 2025, though he had had not yet decided at that time whether his party would run in the 2026 Israeli legislative election. He has reportedly employed two political consultants, one focused on the left-wing and the other focused on the right-wing.

== History ==
=== Formation ===
“The margin of error is very different than if you were the prime minister of Belgium or Sweden, where if you’re a lousy prime minister, maybe the economy will grow slower.

In Israel, the margin of error does not exist.”

— Naftali Bennett,
Speech to Yeshiva University
11 November 2025

According to party registration paperwork filed by Bennett 2026 with the Israeli Corporations Authority, the party plans to "restore security to Israel, and restore the people’s trust in Israel’s ability to defend its borders and the interior of the country while implementing an active security concept." The founders of the party include Bennett, "his wife, Gilat", former member of the Communications Ministry Liran Avishar Ben-Horin, former Strauss Group executive Gadi Lesin and Bruria Naim Arman, who is the founder of "PR firm Community Relations". The founding members also include Giora Levi, who was Bennett’s commander while he served in the Sayeret Matkal unit, as well as Ofer Ogash, who previously ran for Knesset as a member of Yamina, and former Target Market executive Nir Novak.

The party completed its registration in June 2025.

Bennett announced in February 2026 that Tony Fabrizio and George Birnbaum were joining his campaign team.

=== Together alliance ===
On 26 April 2026, Bennett and Yair Lapid announced in a joint press conference that Bennett 2026 and Lapid's party Yesh Atid would run jointly as part of a new political alliance, Together, which will be led by Bennett.

On 5 July 2026, the party name was officially changed to "Together". (Note: Full name in Hebrew: ביחד בראשות בנט מחזירים את התקווה, lit. 'Together led by Bennett restoring hope')

== Platform ==
On 4 September 2025, Bennett stated at a Kfar Saba conference that he would head a centrist slate of candidates in the 2026 election, potentially including Gadi Eisenkot (Yashar) and Avigdor Lieberman (Yisrael Beiteinu), with the goal to defeat Netanyahu's bloc in election and create a Zionist unity government. This government would pursue several major policies, mainly implementing term limits for the position of prime minister, (Note: A draft of his proposed amendment to Basic Law: The Government was posted to his website: https://bennett2026.org.il/hok-yesod-1/) creating an Israeli constitution, establishing a state commission of inquiry into the October 7 attacks, and mandating Haredi conscription to the Israel Defense Forces.

In March 2025, Bennett announced that he would not include Arab parties if he leads the next government. In February 2026, he also ruled out serving in a government led by prime minister Benjamin Netanyahu. In April 2026, while announcing the Together joint slate with Yair Lapid, Bennett described the party as "right-wing liberal Zionist". Bennett and his party have been described as right-wing by The New York Times, as well as Reuters.

=== Military service ===
In January 2026, Bennett presented a proposal called the "Servants Law", (Note: The proposal was posted to his website: https://bennett2026.org.il/meshartim/) which would provide extensive benefits to IDF veterans and reservists. He later also promised to establish a commission to investigate what he called the "sabotage of Haredi enlistment", pledging that "everyone who knowingly took part in violating the Security Service Law during wartime will be investigated."

=== Economy ===
On 12 February 2026, Bennett stated that lowering the cost of living would be a major priority for his government, pledging to "break monopolies, break up cartels, open the market, open exports, imports, competition", and cut regulations to lower prices. He also committed to funding the Israeli Periphery (the illegally occupied Golan Heights and the Negev) with tax cuts, grants, and a plan to double the population within 10 years. (Note: The proposal was posted to his website: https://bennett2026.org.il/kiryat-shmona/)

=== Judaism and the state ===
In April 2026, Bennett said that he believed that cities should be allowed to implement their own policies around public transportation on Shabbat. He also said that he would support breaking the monopoly of the Rabbinate on marriage in Israel by allowing for civil marriage.

== Leadership ==
According to a report by Channel 12, Bennett is expected to retain close control of the party; he will manage the Knesset faction and will remain party leader until 2034. In addition, he will be the only person in the party to select candidates for the party's electoral list, will have the sole ability to choose government ministers, and will control the selection of Knesset committee members. This is in contrast to the thirty-sixth government of Israel, where numerous members of his government defected from it and ultimately brought about its collapse.

Leader	Took office	Left office
Naftali Bennett	2026	present

== Election results ==
=== Knesset ===
Election	Leader	Votes	%	Seats	+/−	Government
2026	Naftali Bennett	with Together		7 / 120	New	TBA

== Knesset members ==
Knesset	Members	Notes
26th	Naftali Bennett, Keren Terner Eyal, Liran Avishar Ben-Horin, Michal Negri, Eitan Ginzburg, Yonatan Shalev, Bruria Naim Arman	
