= Prime Minister Bennett =

Prime Minister Bennett may refer to:

- Naftali Bennett, 13th prime minister of Israel
- R. B. Bennett, 11th prime minister of Canada
