= 2025 opinion polling for the 2026 Israeli legislative election =

In the run up to the 2026 Israeli legislative election, various organisations are conducting opinion polling to gauge voting intention in Israel during the term of the twenty-fifth Knesset. This article lists the results of such polls between 3 January and 25 December 2025. In keeping with the election silence law, no polls may be published from the end of the Friday before the election until the polling stations close on election day at 22:00.

Polls are listed in reverse chronological order, showing the most recent first and using the dates when the survey fieldwork was done, as opposed to the date of publication. Where the fieldwork dates are unknown, the date of publication is given instead.

== Seat projections ==
This section displays voting intention estimates referring to the next Knesset election. The figures listed are Knesset seat counts rather than percentages. Scenario polls are not included here.

=== Guide to the table ===
Parties that fall below the electoral threshold of 3.25% are normally denoted by the percentage of votes that they received, shown in parentheses, e.g. (1.2%), rather than by the number of seats they would have received. If a poll has no information on a particular party, or states that it does not meet the electoral threshold without providing details, that party is instead marked by a dash (–).

The party receiving the highest number of projected seats has its figure displayed in bold with the background shaded in the party's colour. In the case of a tie, the parties tying for the highest number of projected seats have their figures displayed in bold with the backgrounds shaded in their colours.

The 37th government parties and alliances (Likud, Religious Zionist Party, Otzma Yehudit, Shas, and United Torah Judaism) are highlighted. The sum of their projected seats is shown in the column headed "Gov." If that sum constitutes a majority of the Knesset (61 or more seats), it is highlighted and bolded.

=== Polls ===
Fieldwork date	Polling firm	Publisher	Likud	Yesh Atid	RZP	Otzma	Blue & White	Shas	UTJ	Yisrael Beiteinu	Ra'am	Hadash –Ta'al	Dems	Balad	Bennett 2026	Reserv. (Note: Polls before 18 September 2025 refer to it as "Party of Yoaz Hendel".)	Yashar (Note: Polls before 16 September 2025 refer to it as "Party of Gadi Eisenkot".)	Lead	Gov.
25 Dec	Midgam R&C	HaHadashot 12	**25**	9	4	8	(1.9%)	8	7	9	5	5	11	(1.3%)	22	(1.7%)	7	3	52
25 Dec	Filber	Channel 14	**34**	5	5	8	(1.1%)	10	9	9	5	5	10	(2.3%)	12	–	8	22	**66**
24–25 Dec	LRI+P4A	Maariv	**25**	9	(2.9%)	9	(2.2%)	9	7	10	5	5	10	(1.8%)	21	(2.4%)	10	4	50
24–25 Dec	Yossi Tatika	Zman Israel	**25**	9	4	5	–	10	8	10	5	5	10	–	20	4	5	5	52
23 Dec	MM+SN	Channel 13	**25**	9	4	10	(2.2%)	9	7	10	4	6	8	(2.1%)	22	(1.4%)	6	3	55
18 Dec	Filber	Channel 14	**36**	4	4	7	(1.7%)	11	8	10	5	5	11	(2.4%)	11	–	8	25	**66**
17–18 Dec	LRI+P4A	Maariv	**25**	9	(2.1%)	9	(2.3%)	9	7	9	5	5	10	(1.4%)	22	(3.0%)	10	3	50
17–18 Dec	Yossi Tatika	Zman Israel	**26**	10	–	6	–	10	8	10	5	5	10	–	20	4	6	6	50
17 Dec	Direct Polls	i24 News	**35**	(2.7%)	4	8	(1.8%)	10	9	9	6	5	9	(2.6%)	20	(3.0%)	5	15	**66**
11 Dec	Midgam R&C	HaHadashot 12	**27**	9	(2.0%)	8	(2.9%)	9	7	9	5	5	11	(1.3%)	22	(1.6%)	8	5	51
11 Dec	Filber	Channel 14	**35**	4	4	7	(1.2%)	11	8	10	6	5	10	(2.5%)	13	–	7	22	**65**
10–11 Dec	LRI+P4A	Maariv	**28**	8	(2.8%)	8	(2.9%)	9	7	11	5	5	11	(2.0%)	20	(2.8%)	8	8	52
10–11 Dec	Yossi Tatika	Zman Israel	**28**	10	–	6	–	10	8	10	5	4	9	–	21	4	5	7	52
4 Dec	MM+SN	Channel 13	**23**	9	4	9	(2.5%)	10	6	10	4	6	10	(2.1%)	19	4	6	4	52
4 Dec	Kantar	Israel Hayom	**25**	9	(3%)	8	(1.5%)	9	7	9	5	5	9	(2.2%)	23	4	7	2	49
4 Dec	Midgam R&C	HaHadashot 12	**25**	9	4	6	(1.9%)	9	7	9	5	5	12	(1.7%)	21	(2.9%)	8	4	51
4 Dec	Filber	Channel 14	**35**	4	5	7	(1.9%)	11	8	11	5	5	10	(2.3%)	12	–	7	23	**66**
3–4 Dec	LRI+P4A	Maariv	**26**	9	4	8	(2.9%)	8	7	9	5	5	9	(2.2%)	22	(2.2%)	8	4	53
3–4 Dec	Yossi Tatika	Zman Israel	**28**	10	–	6	–	10	8	9	6	5	11	–	20	–	7	8	52
30 Nov	Direct Polls	i24 News	**35**	(2.9%)	5	7	(1.5%)	11	9	10	5	5	10	(2.6%)	19	(2.6%)	4	16	**67**
27 Nov	Midgam R&C	HaHadashot 12	**27**	8	(2.1%)	9	(2%)	9	7	10	5	5	11	(1.4%)	22	(2.9%)	7	5	52
27 Nov	Filber	Channel 14	**35**	4	5	6	(1.9%)	11	9	11	5	5	12	(2.3%)	10	–	7	23	**66**
26–27 Nov	LRI+P4A	Maariv	**25**	9	(2.2%)	8	(2.8%)	8	7	9	5	5	10	(2.0%)	22	4	8	3	49
26–27 Nov	Yossi Tatika	Zman Israel	**28**	11	–	6	–	10	8	10	6	5	10	–	20	–	6	8	52
20 Nov	Midgam R&C	HaHadashot 12	**27**	9	(2.9%)	8	(2.2%)	9	7	9	5	5	11	(2.7%)	22	(1.7%)	8	5	51
20 Nov	Filber	Channel 14	**34**	5	4	6	(2.4%)	11	9	10	6	5	11	(2.3%)	12	–	7	22	**64**
19–20 Nov	LRI+P4A	Maariv	**25**	9	(2.2%)	9	(2.9%)	8	7	9	5	5	11	(1.9%)	23	(2.0%)	9	2	49
19–20 Nov	Yossi Tatika	Zman Israel	**28**	11	–	6	4	10	8	10	5	5	9	–	19	–	5	9	52
13 Nov	Midgam R&C	HaHadashot 12	**27**	9	(2.5%)	9	(2.9%)	9	7	9	5	5	10	(1.6%)	22	(1.2%)	8	5	52
13 Nov	Filber	Channel 14	**35**	4	4	7	(2.2%)	11	9	9	6	5	11	(2.1%)	12	–	7	23	**66**
12–13 Nov	LRI+P4A	Maariv	**24**	9	(1.3%)	8	(2.9%)	8	8	9	5	5	11	(2.4%)	**24**	(2.3%)	9	Tie	48
12–13 Nov	Yossi Tatika	Zman Israel	**29**	10	–	6	4	9	8	10	5	5	10	–	19	–	5	10	52
11 Nov	TrendZone	–	**35**	5	(2.40%)	8	(2.04%)	7	8	6	5	5	11	(2.64%)	22	(3.12%)	8	13	58
6 Nov	Midgam R&C	HaHadashot 12	**27**	9	(2.5%)	9	(2.2%)	8	8	9	5	5	11	(1.8%)	22	(1.4%)	7	5	52
6 Nov	Filber	Channel 14	**35**	5	5	6	(2.7%)	11	8	10	6	5	10	(2.2%)	12	–	7	23	**65**
5–6 Nov	Yossi Tatika	Zman Israel	**29**	9	–	6	4	10	8	10	5	4	9	–	21	–	5	8	53
4–5 Nov	LRI+P4A	Maariv	**26**	10	(2.8%)	7	(2.3%)	9	7	9	5	5	11	(2.0%)	22	(2.9%)	9	4	49
30 Oct	Midgam R&C	HaHadashot 12	**26**	10	(2.7%)	9	(1.6%)	9	7	9	5	5	11	(1.8%)	21	(1.9%)	8	5	51
30 Oct	Filber	Channel 14	**35**	6	5	7	(1.7%)	11	8	9	5	5	10	(2.4%)	12	–	7	23	**66**
29–30 Oct	LRI+P4A	Maariv	**25**	9	(2.2%)	7	(1.9%)	9	7	10	5	6	12	(2.0%)	21	(1.9%)	9	4	48
29–30 Oct	Yossi Tatika	Zman Israel	**30**	10	–	6	4	10	8	10	5	4	9	–	20	–	4	10	54
29 Oct	MM+SN	Channel 13	**27**	10	4	9	(1.8%)	10	7	9	5	4	8	(2.8%)	23	(1.3%)	4	4	57
23 Oct	Midgam R&C	HaHadashot 12	**27**	9	(2.1%)	8	(2.2%)	9	7	9	5	5	13	(1.4%)	21	(1.6%)	7	6	51
23 Oct	Filber	Channel 14	**36**	5	4	7	(2.3%)	11	8	9	5	5	12	(2.4%)	11	–	7	24	**66**
22–23 Oct	Yossi Tatika	Zman Israel	**31**	7	4	5	4	10	7	10	5	5	9	–	18	–	5	13	57
22–23 Oct	LRI+P4A	Maariv	**26**	9	(2.6%)	8	(2.9%)	9	7	10	5	6	12	(2.2%)	19	(2.1%)	9	7	50
19 Oct	Direct Polls	i24 News	**34**	4	5	6	(1.2%)	10	8	9	6	5	10	(2.6%)	17	(2.5%)	6	17	**63**
17 Oct	LRI+P4A	Maariv	**26**	7	4	7	(2.6%)	8	7	9	5	5	11	(1.9%)	20	4	6	6	52
16 Oct	Midgam R&C	HaHadashot 12	**27**	9	(2.5%)	8	(2.6%)	9	7	9	5	5	11	(1.4%)	22	(1.4%)	8	5	51
15–16 Oct	Yossi Tatika	Zman Israel	**34**	7	4	5	4	9	7	10	4	4	7	–	20	–	5	14	59
15 Oct	Filber	Channel 14	**35**	4	5	7	(1.7%)	11	8	11	6	5	10	(2.4%)	13	–	5	22	**66**
15 Oct	TrendZone	–	**40**	4	–	5	–	8	7	5	5	6	12	–	22	–	6	19	60
10 Oct	LRI+P4A	Maariv	**27**	10	(2.3%)	6	(2.3%)	8	7	10	5	5	10	(1.6%)	19	5	8	8	48
9 Oct	MM+SN	Channel 13	**27**	6	4	9	4	9	7	6	5	6	10	(2.6%)	23	(2.7%)	4	4	56
9 Oct	Filber	Channel 14	**34**	(2.6%)	5	6	(2.7%)	11	8	13	5	5	11	(2.4%)	16	–	6	18	**64**
8–10 Oct	A ceasefire between Israel and Hamas is signed and goes into effect																		
30 Sep	LRI+P4A	Maariv	**25**	7	(2.3%)	9	(3.0%)	8	7	10	5	5	10	(2.0%)	22	5	7	3	49
30 Sep	MM+SN	Channel 13	23	6	4	9	4	9	7	7	5	6	10	(2.6%)	**25**	(2.0%)	5	2	52
30 Sep	LRI+P4A	Walla	**24**	7	–	9	–	8	7	11	5	5	9	–	23	5	7	1	48
30 Sep	Direct Polls	i24 News	**33**	4	5	7	(2.7%)	10	8	10	5	5	10	(2.7%)	15	(3.0%)	8	18	**63**
28 Sep	Filber	Channel 14	**34**	4	4	6	(2.7%)	11	8	8	5	5	13	(2.6%)	16	–	6	18	**63**
25 Sep	Midgam R&C	HaHadashot 12	**24**	8	4	5	(2.5%)	9	7	11	5	5	11	(1.9%)	19	4	8	5	49
25 Sep	LRI+P4A	Maariv	**26**	8	(2.5%)	7	(2.9%)	8	7	9	5	5	12	(2.4%)	20	4	9	6	48
18 Sep	Midgam R&C	HaHadashot 12	**24**	9	4	5	(2.6%)	9	7	11	5	5	10	(2.7%)	21	–	10	3	49
17–18 Sep	LRI+P4A	Maariv	**25**	7	(2.4%)	8	4	8	8	10	5	5	11	(1.9%)	20	–	9	5	49
17 Sep	Direct Polls	i24 News	**32**	5	5	6	(1.9%)	10	8	10	5	5	11	(2.7%)	13	–	10	19	**61**
17 Sep	Kantar	Kan 11	**25**	8	(2.7%)	8	4	9	8	9	5	5	10	(2.3%)	21	–	8	4	50
17 Sep	Filber	Channel 14	**33**	4	4	7	4	11	8	8	5	5	11	(2.6%)	15	–	5	18	**63**
17 Sep	MM+SN	Channel 13	**23**	8	4	9	4	9	7	9	4	6	9	(1.9%)	**23**	–	5	Tie	52
16–17 Sep	Yossi Tatika	Zman Israel	**24**	7	–	7	4	9	7	9	5	5	8	–	18	5	12	6	47
11 Sep	Midgam R&C	HaHadashot 12	**25**	9	(2.4%)	7	(1.4%)	9	7	11	5	5	11	(2.2%)	19	–	11	6	48
11 Sep	Midgam R&C	HaHadashot 12	**24**	8	(2.1%)	7	(1.3%)	9	8	10	5	5	11	(2.2%)	18	6	9	6	48
11 Sep	Filber	Channel 14	**34**	8	5	7	4	10	8	8	5	5	12	(2.3%)	14	–	–	20	**64**
10–11 Sep	LRI+P4A	Maariv	**24**	7	4	7	(2.4%)	8	7	10	5	5	11	(2.1%)	23	–	9	1	50
9–10 Sep	Yossi Tatika	Zman Israel	**24**	6	–	7	4	9	7	11	6	5	9	–	20	5	7	4	47
8 Sep	LRI+P4A	Walla	**26**	8	–	7	–	10	7	11	5	5	10	–	23	–	8	3	50
5 Sep	LRI+P4A	Maariv	**25**	8	(1.9%)	7	4	9	7	10	5	5	10	(1.9%)	24	–	6	1	48
4 Sep	Midgam R&C	HaHadashot 12	**24**	7	4	7	(2.1%)	8	7	11	5	5	11	(2.3%)	19	–	12	5	50
3 Sep	Yossi Tatika	Zman Israel	**26**	7	–	7	4	9	7	10	6	4	11	–	23	6	–	3	49
3 Sep	Direct Polls	i24 News	**30**	4	5	6	(2.4%)	10	8	11	5	5	10	(2.8%)	20	6	–	10	59
2 Sep	MM+SN	Channel 13	22	8	4	9	4	10	7	10	5	5	9	(3.0%)	**23**	–	4	1	52
29 Aug	TrendZone	–	**32**	4	–	6	–	9	7	9	6	5	12	–	21	–	9	11	54
28 Aug	TrendZone	–	**32**	–	–	6	4	9	7	9	6	5	12	–	21	–	9	11	54
28 Aug	Filber	Channel 14	**34**	8	5	6	5	11	8	9	5	5	9	(2.1%)	15	–	–	19	**64**
28 Aug	Midgam R&C	HaHadashot 12	**24**	7	4	7	(2.8%)	8	7	10	5	5	11	(2.5%)	20	–	12	4	50
27–28 Aug	LRI+P4A	Maariv	23	9	4	7	4	8	7	12	6	5	10	(2.3%)	**25**	–	–	2	49
27–28 Aug	LRI+P4A	Maariv	**23**	8	4	8	(1.8%)	8	7	11	6	5	9	(2.5%)	22	–	9	1	50
27–28 Aug	LRI+P4A	Maariv	**24**	7	(2.8%)	8	(1.8%)	8	7	10	6	5	9	(2.54%)	21	8	7	3	47
25–26 Aug	Yossi Tatika	Zman Israel	**27**	8	–	7	4	9	7	11	4	6	11	–	26	–	–	1	50
21 Aug	Filber	Channel 14	**34**	8	4	7	4	11	8	8	5	5	10	(2.4%)	16	–	–	18	**64**
20–21 Aug	Yossi Tatika	Zman Israel	**28**	7	4	6	–	9	7	11	6	5	11	–	26	–	–	2	54
20–21 Aug	LRI+P4A	Maariv	21	10	4	7	4	8	7	11	5	5	12	(2.3%)	**26**	–	–	5	47
20–21 Aug	LRI+P4A	Maariv	21	8	4	8	(1.9%)	8	7	9	6	5	11	(1.4%)	**23**	–	10	2	48
20–21 Aug	LRI+P4A	Maariv	20	9	4	8	(1.4%)	8	7	10	5	5	10	(1.4%)	**21**	5	8	1	47
20 Aug	Direct Polls	i24 News	**28**	4	6	9	(2.4%)	10	8	9	5	4	13	(2.9%)	19	5	–	9	**61**
17 Aug	Midgam R&C	HaHadashot 12	**24**	7	4	6	(2.9%)	8	7	11	5	5	11	(1.9%)	20	–	12	4	49
17 Aug	Midgam R&C	HaHadashot 12	**23**	7	4	6	(2.7%)	8	7	10	5	5	11	(1.9%)	19	5	10	4	48
14 Aug	Filber	Channel 14	**33**	8	5	6	4	11	8	8	5	5	10	(2.2%)	17	–	–	16	**63**
13–14 Aug	LRI+P4A	Maariv	23	9	4	7	5	9	7	12	5	5	10	–	**24**	–	–	1	50
13–14 Aug	LRI+P4A	Maariv	21	6	4	7	5	9	7	9	5	5	10	(2.2%)	**23**	–	9	2	48
13 Aug	Yossi Tatika	Zman Israel	**28**	8	5	5	4	10	7	10	5	4	9	–	25	–	–	3	55
10 Aug	Kantar	Kan 11	**26**	6	4	6	4	9	7	10	6	5	8	(2.1%)	22	–	7	4	52
7 Aug	Filber	Channel 14	**34**	8	5	6	5	11	8	8	5	5	11	(2.3%)	14	–	–	20	**64**
6–7 Aug	LRI+P4A	Maariv	**23**	7	4	6	4	9	7	8	5	5	10	(1.4%)	21	–	11	2	49
6 Aug	Yossi Tatika	Zman Israel	**26**	10	–	6	6	10	7	11	6	5	10	–	23	–	–	3	49
3 Aug	MM+SN	Channel 13	**24**	7	4	9	4	9	8	8	6	5	8	(2.5%)	23	–	5	1	54
30–31 Jul	LRI+P4A	Maariv	**25**	8	(2.7%)	7	4	9	8	12	6	4	12	(1.9%)	**25**	–	–	Tie	49
30–31 Jul	LRI+P4A	Maariv	**25**	7	(2.9%)	7	4	9	8	9	6	4	10	(1.5%)	23	–	8	2	49
30–31 Jul	LRI+P4A	Maariv	**21**	7	(2.4%)	6	4	9	8	9	6	4	10	(1.5%)	19	13	4	2	44
30 Jul	Yossi Tatika	Zman Israel	**26**	8	–	7	6	9	7	11	6	5	11	–	24	–	–	2	49
24 Jul	Direct Polls	i24 News	**27**	5	6	7	(2.3%)	9	8	12	5	4	11	(2.8%)	26	–	–	1	57
24 Jul	Direct Polls	i24 News	**25**	4	6	6	–	9	8	9	5	4	10	–	24	10	–	1	54
24 Jul	Filber	Channel 14	**33**	6	4	6	4	11	8	8	6	5	13	(2.5%)	16	–	–	17	**62**
24 Jul	Filber	Channel 14	**34**	9	5	6	6	10	8	15	6	5	16	(2.6%)	–	–	–	18	**63**
23–24 Jul	LRI+P4A	Maariv	**25**	9	(2.6%)	7	5	10	7	12	5	5	11	–	24	–	–	1	49
23–24 Jul	LRI+P4A	Maariv	**24**	9	–	7	4	10	7	11	5	5	10	–	22	–	6	2	48
23–24 Jul	LRI+P4A	Maariv	**24**	8	–	7	5	10	7	10	5	5	10	–	22	7	–	2	48
23 Jul	Yossi Tatika	Zman Israel	**28**	7	–	7	4	7	7	10	6	5	10	–	22	7	–	6	49
23 Jul	MM+SN	Channel 13	**24**	9	(2.8%)	7	4	10	7	10	4	6	11	(2.3%)	**24**	–	4	Tie	48
17 Jul	Filber	Channel 14	**34**	6	5	6	(2.9%)	10	8	9	6	5	13	(2.4%)	18	–	–	16	**63**
17 Jul	Filber	Channel 14	**35**	8	5	6	5	10	8	16	6	5	16	(2.3%)	–	–	–	19	**64**
17 Jul	Yossi Tatika	Zman Israel	**30**	7	4	5	4	8	7	10	5	5	9	–	26	–	–	4	54
16–17 Jul	LRI+P4A	Maariv	**26**	8	4	7	6	9	7	11	5	5	10	(1.8%)	22	–	–	4	52
16–17 Jul	LRI+P4A	Maariv	**26**	8	4	7	5	9	7	10	5	5	9	(1.8%)	18	–	9	8	52
16 Jul	Midgam R&C	HaHadashot 12	**27**	10	(2.9%)	6	6	8	8	10	5	5	12	(1.7%)	23	–	–	4	49
16 Jul	Midgam R&C	HaHadashot 12	**27**	9	(2.9%)	6	(2.6%)	8	8	10	5	5	12	(1.7%)	19	–	11	8	49
16 Jul	Shas withdraws from the government, but remains part of the coalition																		
14 Jul	United Torah Judaism withdraws from the government																		
13 Jul	Direct Polls	i24 News	**32**	4	5	6	(3.1%)	11	8	10	5	4	13	(3.0%)	22	–	–	10	**62**
10 Jul	Filber	Channel 14	**33**	5	5	6	5	11	8	11	5	5	11	(2.4%)	15	–	–	18	**63**
10 Jul	Filber	Channel 14	**34**	8	6	6	7	11	8	14	5	5	16	(2.3%)	–	–	–	18	**65**
10 Jul	Yossi Tatika	Zman Israel	**32**	5	–	5	4	9	7	10	5	4	8	–	26	–	5	6	53
9–10 Jul	LRI+P4A	Maariv	24	7	4	7	7	9	7	10	6	4	10	(2.2%)	**25**	–	–	1	51
3 Jul	Filber	Channel 14	**34**	5	5	6	5	10	8	11	6	5	11	(2.2%)	14	–	–	20	**63**
3 Jul	Filber	Channel 14	**35**	7	5	6	6	11	8	14	6	5	17	(2.5%)	–	–	–	18	**65**
2–3 Jul	LRI+P4A	Maariv	**27**	9	(2.6%)	7	6	9	8	9	5	5	11	(1.9%)	24	–	–	3	51
2–3 Jul	LRI+P4A	Maariv	**28**	9	(2.9%)	7	5	9	8	8	5	5	11	(2.0%)	19	–	6	9	52
2 Jul	National Unity reverts to its former name, Blue and White																		
1 Jul	Yossi Tatika	Zman Israel	**29**	6	–	6	4	10	7	8	5	5	8	–	25	–	7	4	52
1 Jul	MM+SN	Channel 13	**25**	8	4	7	4	10	7	12	5	5	10	(3.1%)	23	–	–	2	53
1 Jul	MM+SN	Channel 13	**25**	7	4	8	(2.4%)	10	7	10	5	5	9	–	21	–	9	4	54
1 Jul	Midgam R&C	HaHadashot 12	**26**	9	(1.9%)	6	6	9	8	10	5	5	12	(2.0%)	24	–	–	2	49
1 Jul	Midgam R&C	HaHadashot 12	**26**	7	(2.0%)	6	5	9	8	9	5	5	10	(2.0%)	22	–	8	4	49
30 Jun	Gadi Eisenkot announces that he will leave National Unity and resign from Knesset																		

Fieldwork date	Polling firm	Publisher	Likud	Yesh Atid	RZP	Otzma	National Unity	Shas	UTJ	Yisrael Beiteinu	Ra'am	Hadash –Ta'al	Dems	Balad	Bennett 2026 (Note: Polls before 1 April 2025 refer to it as "Party of Naftali Bennett".)	Hendel party	Lead	Gov.
26 Jun	Direct Polls	i24 News	**33**	4	4	6	5	11	8	9	5	5	13	–	17	–	16	**62**
26 Jun	Filber	Channel 14	**33**	5	5	6	6	11	8	10	5	5	11	(2.1%)	15	–	18	**63**
26 Jun	Filber	Channel 14	**36**	7	4	6	8	11	8	16	5	5	14	(2.4%)	–	–	20	**65**
25–26 Jun	LRI+P4A	Maariv	25	8	(2.9%)	7	8	9	7	9	6	5	11	(1.5%)	25	–	Tie	48
25–26 Jun	LRI+P4A	Maariv	**23**	8	(2.7%)	7	7	9	7	9	5	5	10	(1.5%)	22	8	1	46
25 Jun	Kantar	Kan 11	**28**	8	(1.8%)	7	7	9	7	10	6	5	9	(2.1%)	24	–	4	51
25 Jun	Kantar	Kan 11	**31**	14	(2.2%)	7	13	10	8	15	6	5	11	(2.1%)	–	–	16	56
24–25 Jun	LRI+P4A	Walla	**26**	8	–	6	8	9	7	10	5	5	11	–	24	–	2	48
24 Jun	Midgam R&C	HaHadashot 12	**26**	9	(~2.0%)	6	7	9	8	9	5	5	12	(~2.0%)	24	–	2	49
23–24 Jun	Yossi Tatika	Zman Israel	**28**	6	–	6	8	11	7	10	6	5	10	–	23	–	5	52
20 Jun	LRI+P4A	Maariv	**27**	13	(2.7%)	6	13	10	8	19	6	4	14	(1.9%)	–	–	8	51
20 Jun	LRI+P4A	Maariv	**26**	9	(3.0%)	6	7	10	7	10	6	4	11	(2.0%)	24	–	2	49
20 Jun	LRI+P4A	Maariv	**24**	8	(2.8%)	5	6	10	7	9	5	5	11	(1.9%)	23	7	1	46
19 Jun	Filber	Channel 14	**33**	5	5	6	6	11	8	8	5	5	12	(2.2%)	16	–	17	**63**
19 Jun	Filber	Channel 14	**36**	7	4	6	8	11	8	15	5	5	15	(2.4%)	–	–	21	**65**
18 Jun	MM+SN	Channel 13	**27**	7	(3.1%)	6	7	10	7	11	4	6	11	(2.7%)	24	–	3	50
13 Jun	Start of the Twelve-Day War																	
12 Jun	Filber	Channel 14	**32**	5	5	6	6	11	8	9	5	6	13	(2.1%)	14	–	18	**62**
12 Jun	Filber	Channel 14	**33**	6	5	6	8	11	8	17	5	6	15	(2.2%)	–	–	16	**63**
11 Jun	MM+SN	Channel 13	24	8	–	9	7	10	7	8	5	6	9	–	**27**	–	3	50
8 Jun	Bennett 2026 is registered as a party																	
5 Jun	SF+DP	Channel 14	**33**	6	6	7	8	10	8	17	5	5	15	(2.3%)	–	–	16	**64**
5 Jun	SF+DP	Channel 14	**32**	5	5	7	6	10	8	10	5	5	14	–	14	–	18	**62**
4–5 Jun	LRI+P4A	Maariv	**22**	12	(2.8%)	9	15	10	8	19	6	4	15	(1.9%)	–	–	3	49
4–5 Jun	LRI+P4A	Maariv	20	9	(2.6%)	8	8	9	8	10	6	4	11	(1.7%)	**27**	–	7	45
4–5 Jun	LRI+P4A	Maariv	19	7	–	8	7	9	7	9	5	5	11	–	**24**	9	5	43
4 Jun	MM+SN	Channel 13	24	8	(2.4%)	8	9	10	7	9	4	4	10	(2.6%)	**27**	–	3	49
4 Jun	Midgam R&C	HaHadashot 12	22	9	(2.8%)	8	7	10	8	10	5	5	12	(1.2%)	**24**	–	2	48
29 May	SF+DP	Channel 14	**34**	6	6	6	8	10	8	17	5	5	15	(2.5%)	–	–	17	**64**
29 May	SF+DP	Channel 14	**34**	5	5	6	6	10	8	8	6	5	14	(2.4%)	13	–	20	**63**
28–29 May	LRI+P4A	Maariv	**23**	14	(2.1%)	9	16	9	8	18	4	6	13	(2.4%)	–	–	5	49
28–29 May	LRI+P4A	Maariv	19	10	(1.8%)	8	9	9	8	10	4	6	9	(2.1%)	**28**	–	9	44
25 May	Midgam R&C	HaHadashot 12	21	9	(2.6%)	8	8	10	7	10	5	5	13	(1.4%)	**22**	–	1	46
22 May	SF+DP	Channel 14	**33**	6	5	8	8	11	7	16	5	5	16	(2.3%)	–	–	17	**64**
22 May	SF+DP	Channel 14	**32**	5	5	7	6	10	8	10	5	5	14	(2.3%)	13	–	18	**62**
21–22 May	LRI+P4A	Maariv	**23**	15	(1.9%)	9	16	9	7	19	4	6	12	(2.0%)	–	–	4	48
21–22 May	LRI+P4A	Maariv	20	11	(1.5%)	8	9	9	7	11	4	6	7	(2.0%)	**28**	–	8	44
20 May	MM+SN	Channel 13	20	7	4	9	6	10	7	10	4	6	8	(1.8%)	**29**	–	9	50
15 May	SF+DP	Channel 14	**34**	5	5	7	8	10	8	17	5	5	16	(2.5%)	–	–	17	**64**
7 May	Midgam R&C	HaHadashot 12	21	9	(2.3%)	8	7	10	8	10	5	5	14	(2.9%)	**23**	–	2	47
6–7 May	LRI+P4A	Maariv	**23**	13	(2.3%)	9	16	9	7	17	5	5	16	(1.9%)	–	–	6	48
6–7 May	LRI+P4A	Maariv	21	10	(1.8%)	9	9	9	7	10	5	5	11	(2.0%)	**24**	–	3	46
5 May	MM+SN	Channel 13	**24**	11	4	11	13	10	7	15	5	6	14	(2.3%)	–	–	9	56
5 May	MM+SN	Channel 13	20	7	(2.5%)	11	5	10	7	8	6	6	9	–	**31**	–	11	48
29–30 Apr	LRI+P4A	Maariv	**21**	13	4	9	16	9	7	16	5	5	15	(1.8%)	–	–	5	50
29–30 Apr	LRI+P4A	Maariv	19	10	(2.8%)	9	8	9	7	11	5	5	11	(1.6%)	**26**	–	7	44
24 Apr	SF+DP	Channel 14	**34**	5	6	6	9	10	8	16	5	5	16	(2.4%)	–	–	18	**64**
20 Apr	Kantar	Kan 11	**24**	13	(2.8%)	9	16	10	8	16	5	5	14	(1.6%)	–	–	8	51
20 Apr	Kantar	Kan 11	23	8	(2.6%)	8	9	10	7	10	5	5	10	(2.0%)	**25**	–	2	48
16–17 Apr	LRI+P4A	Maariv	**22**	11	(2.9%)	11	15	10	7	17	5	5	17	(1.9%)	–	–	5	50
16–17 Apr	LRI+P4A	Maariv	19	8	(2.9%)	10	7	9	7	10	5	5	11	(1.8%)	**29**	–	10	45
10 Apr	SF+DP	Channel 14	**33**	5	5	6	8	10	8	18	5	5	17	(2.3%)	–	–	15	**62**
6 Apr	Midgam R&C	HaHadashot 12	**24**	14	(2.7%)	10	14	10	8	14	5	5	16	(2.4%)	–	–	8	52
6 Apr	Midgam R&C	HaHadashot 12	22	8	(2.4%)	9	8	10	8	9	5	5	13	(2.5%)	**23**	–	1	49
4 Apr	LRI+P4A	Maariv	**24**	14	4	9	14	10	6	16	5	5	13	(1.9%)	–	–	8	53
4 Apr	LRI+P4A	Maariv	21	9	–	8	8	9	7	9	5	5	10	–	**29**	–	8	45
4 Apr	LRI+P4A	Maariv	21	8	–	8	8	9	7	9	5	5	9	–	**24**	8	3	45
27 Mar	SF+DP	Channel 14	**31**	5	5	7	7	11	8	19	6	5	16	(2.6%)	–	–	12	**62**
19–20 Mar	LRI+P4A	Maariv	**22**	12	5	10	16	10	7	16	4	6	12	(1.8%)	–	–	6	54
19–20 Mar	LRI+P4A	Maariv	19	8	5	9	9	9	7	9	4	6	10	–	**25**	–	6	49
18–19 Mar	LRI+P4A	Maariv	**23**	13	(2.6%)	10	17	10	7	17	4	5	14	(2.0%)	–	–	6	50
18–19 Mar	LRI+P4A	Maariv	19	9	(2.4%)	9	10	9	7	9	4	5	12	(1.6%)	**27**	–	8	44
19 Mar	Otzma Yehudit rejoins the government																	
17 Mar	Midgam R&C	HaHadashot 12	**24**	14	(2.9%)	10	15	10	8	14	6	5	14	(2.2%)	–	–	9	52
17 Mar	Midgam R&C	HaHadashot 12	**24**	11	(2.7%)	9	7	9	8	9	6	5	12	(2.2%)	**22**	–	Tie	50
17 Mar	SF+DP	Channel 14	**34**	6	5	6	8	11	8	14	5	5	18	(2.3%)	–	–	16	**64**
13 Mar	New Hope merges with Likud for the 2026 election																	

Fieldwork date	Polling firm	Publisher	Likud	Yesh Atid	RZP	Otzma	National Unity	Shas	UTJ	Yisrael Beiteinu	Ra'am	Hadash –Ta'al	Dems	Balad	New Hope	Bennett party	Lead	Gov.
12–13 Mar	LRI+P4A	Maariv	**24**	12	4	9	17	10	7	17	4	6	10	(1.2%)	(1.4%)	–	7	54
12–13 Mar	LRI+P4A	Maariv	21	9	4	8	9	9	7	10	4	6	8	–	–	**25**	4	49
11 Mar	MM+SN	Channel 13	**26**	11	5	7	18	10	7	15	5	5	11	(2.3%)	(0.7%)	–	8	55
6 Mar	SF+DP	Channel 14	**32**	7	5	8	7	10	8	16	5	5	17	(2.6%)	–	–	15	**63**
5–6 Mar	LRI+P4A	Maariv	**22**	14	4	9	17	10	7	15	4	6	12	(1.4%)	(1.4%)	–	5	52
5 Mar	Midgam R&C	HaHadashot 12	**25**	14	4	8	16	9	8	12	5	5	14	(2.2%)	(1.9%)	–	9	54
5 Mar	Midgam R&C	HaHadashot 12	**24**	11	0	7	9	9	8	8	5	5	10	–	–	**24**	Tie	48
27 Feb	SF+DP	Channel 14	**33**	7	5	7	9	10	8	15	5	5	16	(2.2%)	–	–	17	**63**
26–27 Feb	LRI+P4A	Maariv	**23**	12	4	9	16	9	7	16	5	5	14	(1.0%)	(1.1%)	–	7	52
26–27 Feb	LRI+P4A	Maariv	20	9	4	8	9	9	7	10	4	5	10	(1.0%)	(0.8%)	**25**	5	48
19–20 Feb	LRI+P4A	Maariv	**22**	13	4	9	17	10	7	16	4	6	12	–	–	–	5	52
19–20 Feb	LRI+P4A	Maariv	21	10	–	8	9	9	7	10	4	5	9	–	(0.8%)	**24**	3	45
17 Feb	Midgam R&C	HaHadashot 12	**25**	13	5	7	17	9	8	12	5	5	14	(1.4%)	(1.3%)	–	8	54
17 Feb	Midgam R&C	HaHadashot 12	**23**	9	4	7	8	9	8	7	5	5	12	(1.4%)	(1.0%)	**23**	Tie	51
13 Feb	SF+DP	Channel 14	**32**	7	6	6	9	10	8	15	5	5	17	(2.3%)	–	–	15	**62**
6 Feb	SF+DP	Channel 14	**33**	6	6	5	10	11	8	15	5	5	16	(2.3%)	–	–	17	**63**
5–6 Feb	LRI+P4A	Maariv	**24**	13	4	9	17	9	7	15	4	6	12	(1.2%)	(0.9%)	–	7	53
5–6 Feb	LRI+P4A	Maariv	22	10	(2.8%)	9	11	9	7	9	6	4	9	–	(0.5%)	**24**	2	47
5 Feb	MM+SN	Channel 13	**26**	8	4	9	17	10	7	16	5	6	12	(1.6%)	(0.4%)	–	9	56
5 Feb	MM+SN	Channel 13	24	5	–	8	9	10	6	9	4	5	11	–	–	**29**	5	48
29–30 Jan	LRI+P4A	Maariv	**21**	14	4	8	19	9	7	15	5	5	13	(1.4%)	(1.5%)	–	2	49
29–30 Jan	LRI+P4A	Maariv	20	10	(2.6%)	8	12	9	7	9	5	5	9	–	(0.5%)	**26**	6	44
23 Jan	Midgam R&C	HaHadashot 12	**24**	14	4	8	18	9	7	13	6	5	13	(2.4%)	(1.1%)	–	6	52
23 Jan	Midgam R&C	HaHadashot 12	**23**	10	(2.4%)	7	11	9	7	7	6	4	12	(2.4%)	(0.8%)	**23**	Tie	46
22–23 Jan	LRI+P4A	Maariv	**21**	13	4	9	18	10	7	16	5	5	12	(1.8%)	(2.0%)	–	3	51
22–23 Jan	LRI+P4A	Maariv	19	10	(2.1%)	8	12	9	7	10	5	5	9	–	(1.6%)	**27**	8	43
22 Jan	Smith Consulting	The Truth Machine	**26**	12	5	8	16	9	7	16	5	5	11	–	–	–	10	55
21 Jan	Otzma Yehudit leaves the government; maintaining continued support from outside the coalition; Otzma gains a seat and RZP loses one due to the Norwegian law																	
15–16 Jan	LRI+P4A	Maariv	**23**	14	4	7	17	10	7	15	5	5	13	(1.4%)	(1.1%)	–	6	51
15–16 Jan	LRI+P4A	Maariv	21	9	(1.8%)	7	11	10	7	9	5	5	10	–	(0.3%)	**26**	5	45
8–9 Jan	LRI+P4A	Maariv	**22**	14	4	6	19	10	7	15	5	5	13	(1.5%)	(2.0%)	–	3	49
8–9 Jan	LRI+P4A	Maariv	21	10	(2.2%)	6	11	9	7	9	5	5	10	–	(1.0%)	**27**	6	43
3 Jan	LRI+P4A	Maariv	**24**	15	4	6	18	9	7	16	5	5	11	(2.1%)	(0.9%)	–	6	50
3 Jan	LRI+P4A	Maariv	22	10	4	6	10	9	7	8	5	4	9	–	(0.5%)	**26**	4	48
