= Liran Avishar Ben-Horin =

Israeli bureaucrat and politician

- לירן אבישר בן-חורין
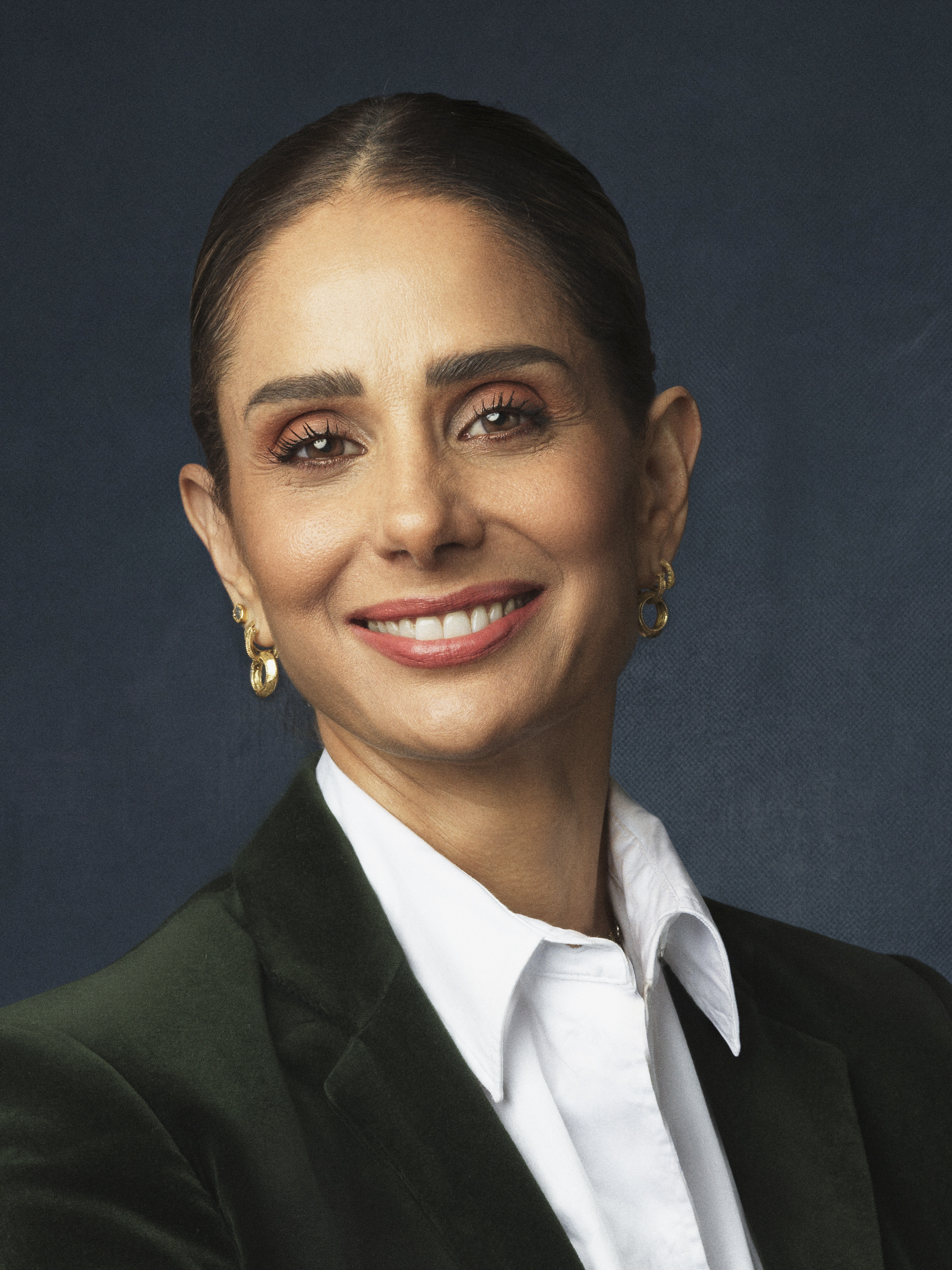
- Avishar Ben-Horin in 2026

Faction represented in the Knesset
- 2026–: Together

Other roles
- 2020–2023: Director-General of the Ministry of Communications

Personal details
- Born: Liran Avishar; 1976 Migdal HaEmek, Israel
- Party: Bennett 2026 (since 2026)
- Spouse: Itay Ben-Horin
- Children: 2
- Education: Tel Aviv University (BA); New York University (LLM)
- Occupation: Civil servant; Politician

Liran Avishar Ben-Horin (Hebrew: לירן אבישר בן-חורין; born 1976) is an Israeli bureaucrat and politician who served as director-general of the Ministry of Communications between 2020 and 2023. She has served as an MK for Together and as chair of the Finance Committee since 2026.

== Biography ==
Ben-Horin was born in Migdal HaEmek. Her father, a Revisionist activist, was born in Morocco and moved to Israel as part of the Youth Aliyah, while her mother was born in Tunisia. At the age of 17, Ben-Horin travelled to Poland as part of a delegation that visited Nazi-era death camps. During the trip, Ben-Horin had a public confrontation with then-education minister Shulamit Aloni, who also attended the trip, regarding the flying of Israeli flags during the visit, which resulted in media coverage and an interview of the two on Erev Hadash.

Ben-Horin then served in the IDF as an officer in the Infantry Corps and as a platoon leader in an officers' training program. After her service, she earned a bachelor's degree in law and business management from Tel Aviv University, and a Master's degree in law from New York University. She additionally underwent a management course at Harvard University.

Ben-Horin worked as an aide and an economic advisor to Attorney General of Israel Menachem Mazuz. In 2006, she moved to the United States, working for two years as the Jewish Agency's aliyah director in the United States and Canada, and subsequently for another two years as the aliyah director of the Israel Movement for Reform. In 2010, she became the chief of staff for the director of the Prime Minister's Office, Harel Locker. In 2013 she was appointed CEO of Masa Israel Journey, serving until December 2019.

In September 2019, Ben-Horin joined the political party Telem, and represented the party in coalition negotiations after the September 2019 Knesset election. In May 2020, Ben-Horin was appointed director of the Ministry of Communications by incoming Minister Yoaz Hendel. She resigned from the job in March 2023, several months after Hendel was replaced as minister by Shlomo Karhi. (Note: Ben-Horin was also the ministry's director under Minister Eitan Ginzburg, who served between May and June 2021 and was both preceded and succeeded by Hendel)

In April 2026, Ben-Horin announced she would seek election to the Knesset as a member of Bennett 2026's electoral list. She was assigned the fifth slot on the party's joint list with Yesh Atid, Together.

She was elected to the Knesset as Together won 12 seats. The following month, Ben-Horin was appointed the chair of the Finance Committee.

== Personal life ==
Ben-Horin is married to Itay Ben-Horin, who runs a PR firm responsible for Blue and White's campaign in the April 2019 Knesset election. The couple has two children and resides in Kfar Sirkin.
