= Together (Israel) =

Israeli political party

Together ביחד
- Leader: Naftali Bennett
- Founder: Naftali Bennett; Yair Lapid
- Founded: 26 April 2026
- Headquarters: Ra'anana
- Ideology: Liberal Zionism; Economic liberalism
- Political position: Centre to centre-right
- Member parties: Bennett 2026; Yesh Atid
- Knesset: 12 / 120

Election symbol
- רק رق

Website
- be-yahad.org.il

Together – Led by Bennett (Hebrew: ביחד בראשות בנט, romanized: B'Yachad Berashut Bennett) is an Israeli political alliance founded in April 2026 by former prime ministers Naftali Bennett and Yair Lapid and their parties Bennett 2026 and Yesh Atid. The alliance ran in the 2026 Israeli legislative election with Bennett as its leader, winning 12 seats.

== Background ==
Following the 2013 election, Bennett, then leader of The Jewish Home, and Lapid, the newly elected leader of Yesh Atid, coordinated their coalition negotiations in what became known in Israeli politics as the “Brothers' Pact” or “Brothers’ Alliance”. Under the arrangement, neither party would enter Benjamin Netanyahu’s government without the other, increasing their negotiating leverage and limiting Netanyahu’s ability to form a coalition with his traditional ultra-Orthodox partners, Shas and United Torah Judaism. The resulting 33rd government included both The Jewish Home and Yesh Atid, with Bennett serving as minister of Economy and Lapid as minister of Finance, and was the first Israeli government since 2005 not to include ultra-Orthodox parties.

In the 2021 Israeli legislative election, Naftali Bennett and Yair Lapid ran as leaders of Yamina and Yesh Atid, respectively. Following the election, the two parties helped form a unity government in June 2021 in which Bennett served as prime minister, with Lapid taking over as prime minister in July 2022. The government collapsed in June 2022, with Bennett retiring from politics, and the government being replaced in December, following the November 2022 Israeli legislative election, by a coalition led by Likud with Benjamin Netanyahu as prime minister.

In April 2025, Bennett announced the creation of a new political party, Bennett 2026, to contest the 2026 Israeli legislative election. In late 2025 and early 2026, Israeli media reported negotiations for a potential run between Bennett 2026, Yesh Atid, Gadi Eisenkot's Yashar party, and Yisrael Beiteinu.

== Founding ==
On 26 April 2026, Yesh Atid and Bennett 2026 publicly announced the formation of Together, with the intention of contesting the 2026 election jointly, led by Bennett. The two party leaders signed an agreement the night before. The two parties invited Yashar to join the alliance. Lapid indicated to Bennett that he would be willing to take a third slot on the list to allow Eisenkot to take his slot, but Eisenkot was reportedly unreceptive to the idea. Eisenkot said he had anticipated forming a centrist "super-party" amongst the three of them, but was informed by phone about the Together alliance "minutes before it was publicly announced."

== Campaign ==
The party had improved its standing in polls ahead of the 2026 Israeli legislative election, polling close to Eisenkot's Yashar, its main rival within the opposition.

Together won 12 seats in the election.

== Platform ==
The party platform as outlined in the party website is as follows:

1. Education: Modernize the Ministry of Education with attractive pay for teachers so that public education is at the same quality as in private schools
2. Cost of Living: Reduce food prices by 30% in three years through facilitating economic competition
3. Government: Prepare a constitution based on the principles of the Israeli Declaration of Independence, establish a state commission of inquiry into the October 7 attacks, establish a term limit of 8 years for the post of prime minister, regulate the Basic Laws and the judiciary through broad consensus
4. National security: Restore security by effective elimination of threats and through recruiting 20,000 soldiers into the Israel Defense Forces (IDF), end political isolation by building regional alliances
5. Personal security: Restore personal security across the country, including the Galilee and Negev, by dismantling crime families at the root in cooperation with the Shin Bet and IDF
6. Public service: Run public service based on high-tech standards with measurable goals, transparency, and personal responsibility, provide fair return for Israeli taxpayers, decentralize powers to local authorities by closing seven offices, shift from political appointments to professional appointments, hold ministers accountable to the public
7. Haredi integration: Integrate the Haredi community into Israeli society through a common education system and Haredi conscription into the IDF, end state financing for those who do not participate in the state education system, refuse to serve, or refuse to go to work
8. International status: Improve Israel's position in the world by combatting campaigns against Israel while creating positive influence to support Israel and its policies, end political isolation through establishing regional alliances, concentrate powers in a national, professional, and technologically advanced information body as part of the prime minister's national security effort

=== Constitutionalism and law ===
==== Constitutionalism ====
During the first rally for the new party, Bennett announced that the party would create an Israeli Constitution "in the spirit of the declaration of Independence". This follows earlier announcements, and a platform pillar published by Yesh Atid. Separately, both parties have committed to term limits for the Prime Minister, and other constitutional reforms. (Note: A draft of his proposed amendment to Basic Law: The Government was posted to his website. חוק-יסוד – הממשלה – תיקון תקופת כהונה מרבית בתפקיד ראש הממשלה. מפלגת ביחד בראשות נפתלי בנט | ביחד נתקן את ישראל (in Hebrew).)

==== State Commission into 7 October ====
While a citizen led investigation into 7 October has commenced, the Israeli government has rejected calls for a full scale, apolitical, State Commission of Inquiry. Bennett announced that his government's first action would be forming such a commission, which follows earlier commitments from both Bennett and Yesh Atid.

==== Law and order in the Negev ====
Bennett and Lapid intend to fight the crime wave in Israel's southern Negev region. In part, the plan includes mandatory minimum sentences for certain crimes, and increasing the presence of the Shin Bet in the region. Additionally, the entire Negev region would be declared to be under a state of emergency, and protection racket and agricultural crime would be defined as terrorism against the state.

=== Economy ===
On 12 February 2026, Bennett stated that lowering the cost of living would be a major priority for his government, pledging to "break monopolies, break up cartels, open the market, open exports, imports, competition", and cut regulations to lower prices. He also committed to funding the Israeli Periphery (the Golan Heights and the Negev) with tax cuts, grants, and a plan to double the population within 10 years. (Note: The proposal was posted to his website) In July, he released a more detailed plan to these ends, which included deregulating kosher certifications.

The Together party also said that they would reduce the phenomenon of 'Coalition Funds', where large sums of government money is promised to special interests in exchange for supporting a coalition.

==== Veterans benefits ====
In January 2026, Bennett presented a proposal called the "Servants Law", (Note: The proposal was posted to his website) which would provide extensive benefits to IDF veterans and reservists. Lapid has called for removing benefits from draft dodgers, which would save 60 billion shekels each year.

==== Public transportation ====
Investment into public transportation, with increasing the amount of high speed rail in the country and improving the reliability of buses. Additionally, creating a national plan to fight congestion, and transferring transit planning to local authorities, including the authority to run transit on shabbat.

==== Retiree benefits ====
Linking the Bituah Leumi retirement benefits to the average salary, and doubling pensions for retirees whose personal pension is less than 6,000 NIS per month.

==== Housing ====
Lapid announced that their government would expand the state-sponsored long term rental program, and give all tenants of those properties the right to buy the property after ten years, in a lease purchase contract arrangement.

=== Healthcare ===
Increasing funding for mental health in the Israeli Health Basket, and increasing the amount and availability of mental health professionals.

=== Education ===
Merging the four-streamed education system into a single, national curriculum. In their plan to improve the Negev, Together said that they would address the teacher crisis in the Bedouin education system. Building on the law that removed recognition from teaching degrees earned under the Palestinian authority, they would fast track qualifications for Arabic speaking teachers.

Yair Lapid announced that they would lengthen the school day until 4pm, and fund classes, extracurriculars, and school meals.

=== The religious status quo ===
==== Military service ====
Both Bennett and Lapid support mandating Haredi conscription to the Israel Defense Forces. Bennett promised to establish a commission to investigate what he called the "sabotage of Haredi enlistment", pledging that "everyone who knowingly took part in violating the Security Service Law during wartime will be investigated."

==== Judaism and the state ====
Both Bennett and Lapid have said that they believed that cities should be allowed to implement their own policies around public transportation on Shabbat and support breaking the monopoly of the Rabbinate on marriage in Israel by allowing for civil marriage.

==== Education ====
The party announced plans to unify the fractured education system, which is currently separated into four distinct streams: Secular Jewish, Religious Jewish, Haredi, and Arab. This would entail a common curriculum, which was also announced by Yesh Atid, that would highlight Israel and a national identity.

Furthermore, they would remove funding from organizations that are against the common draft.

== Ideology and political position ==
As the party is relatively new, its ideological and political positions are not necessarily clear, but since the party is a merger of Yesh Atid and Bennett 2026, various assumptions have been made about the party based on its developing platform and constituent factions.

The American Israel Policy Forum lists the party's ideology as "Centrism, separation of religion and state, security-focused Zionism".

Jewish Virtual Library says that the party is "generally characterized as a centrist to center-right alliance", to unify "Lapid’s liberal, secular-oriented base with Bennett’s right-leaning, nationalist supporters" and represents attempts to unify parts of the Israeli opposition "by uniting leaders with differing political backgrounds under a single electoral framework". According to Jewish Virtual Library, reactions to the formation of the party were mixed, as some on the right wing "characterized the merger as ideologically inconsistent and questioned its potential coalition partners", while others hailed the merger as a much-needed step for the opposition.

TheMarker, an Israeli business daily paper, noted "Bennett describes himself as a proponent of "economic liberalism on the Right."" and that his policies, such as reducing the power of the Histadrut and reducing government intervention, belong to "a broader ideological school of thought—one holding that the market knows better than the state", which sees business as a primary driver of growth, to which government regulation is mostly seen as a hurdle.

== Composition ==
In the lead up to the 2026 Israeli legislative election, Bennett and Lapid unified their two political parties into a single electoral list.

Name	Ideology	Position	Leader
Bennett 2026	Zionism; Economic liberalism Constitutionalism	Right-wing	Naftali Bennett
Yesh Atid	Liberal Zionism; Liberalism; Secularism	Centre	Yair Lapid

=== Bennett 2026 ===
Bennett had expressed interest in running again for prime minister going as far back as 2024. This was confirmed when he registered his party in April 2025 under the temporary name "Bennett 2026," apparently abandoning his older affiliations with New Right and Yamina. Bennett confirmed he was running for the position of prime minister again in a talk at Yeshiva University on 11 November 2025.

Bennett is intending to maintain close control over the party, managing it until 2034, being the only person selecting candidates for the party's electoral lists and choosing government ministers in hopes of preventing the situation he was put in as prime minister in 2021 which led to his government's collapse.

Bennett promised to form a broad centrist Zionist unity government with Gadi Eisenkot's Yashar and Avigdor Lieberman's Yisrael Beiteinu parties in a speech he gave at a conference in Kfar Saba. In that same speech, he promised to impose term limits on the position of prime minister and draft a formal constitution for Israel. In a speech to olim in Tel Aviv, he also said he would initiate a state commission into how the 7 October massacres were able to happen, to pass a law enforcing Haredi conscription, to decrease the cost of living by breaking up monopolies and deregulating the economy, and to focus on law and order.

=== Yesh Atid ===
According to a Reshet Bet report from 28 April 2026, Yesh Atid will be given 10 of the top 24 seats on the party's 2026 electoral list.

Lapid announced his party's electoral list on 5 September, which includes himself, Meirav Ben Ari, Noam Tibon, Meirav Cohen, Ram Ben Barak, Naor Shiri, Vladimir Beliak, Yorai Lahav-Hertzanu, Yasmin Fridman, Neta Attias, Moshe Tur-Paz, Simon Davidson, Shelly Tal Meron, Roni Malkai and Matti Sarfati Harkavi.

=== Electoral list ===
The combined list includes four Yesh Atid candidates in the top ten slots.

== Knesset members ==
Knesset term	Seats	Faction	Members
26th (2026–)	7	Bennett 2026	Naftali Bennett, Keren Terner Eyal, Liran Avishar Ben-Horin, Michal Hirsch Negri, Eitan Ginzburg, Yonatan Shalev, Bruria Naim Arman
26th (2026–)	5	Yesh Atid	Yair Lapid, Meirav Ben-Ari, Noam Tibon, Meirav Cohen, Ram Ben-Barak

== Election results ==
=== Knesset ===
Election	Leader	Votes	%	Seats	+/−	Government
2026	Naftali Bennett	532,018	9.34 (#3)	12 / 120	New	TBA
