= My Israel =

Right-wing Israeli activist group

- ישראל שלי
- Formation: 2010
- Founder: Ayelet Shaked; Naftali Bennett
- Purpose: Zionism
- Location: Israel
- Region served: Israel
- Website: myisrael.org.il/action/en

My Israel (Hebrew: ישראל שלי, Yisra'el Sheli) is an Israeli right-wing extra-parliamentary movement.

== History ==
The movement was founded in early 2010 by Ayelet Shaked (Note: Later a right-wing politician, who became Minister of Justice in Netanyahu's coalition government in 2015.) and Naftali Bennett, (Note: Who became the 13th Prime Minister of Israel in 2021) then leader of the Yesha Council, representing settlers. The pair had previously worked together in Benjamin Netanyahu's office, and both later became right-wing politicians in the Knesset under PM Netanyahu.

In May 2011, the movement began opening branches throughout the country. In July, branches were opened in Haifa, Netanya, Ra'anana, Tiberias, El'ad, Beersheba, Giv'at Shmuel, Rishon LeZion and Kiryat Bialik.

In September 2014, the movement was registered as a nonprofit organization run by Sarah Haetzni-Cohen.

== Description ==
The My Israel website (archived 2023; Google translate from Hebrew) states: "My Israel is an activist Zionist movement, which works with the aim of bringing to the public agenda issues that are at the forefront of the Zionist vision and action, in order to strengthen the Jewish and democratic identity of the country."

The movement cooperates with the Yesha Council in the fields of logistics and PR. It deals with public relations across the internet, and especially on social networks, but also arranges protests and demonstrations against alleged anti-Zionist activity in society and the media.

As of October 2024, the group's Facebook page had 194,000 likes and 232,000 followers.

== Activism ==
=== 2010 Wikipedia editing course ===
In 2010, My Israel started an organized campaign to insert "Zionist" editing onto Wikipedia in order to combat what it perceived as "anti-Israel entries." The group set-up workshops to show people how to edit, in collaboration with the Yesha Council (then under director Naftali Bennett). Around 50 people took part in the course. Project organiser Ayelet Shaked said in a radio interview that the information had to be reliable and meet Wikipedia rules, citing examples such as the use of the term "occupation" in Wikipedia entries, as well as in the editing of entries that link Israel with Judea and Samaria and Jewish history. One participant said that it was not a "Zionist conspiracy to take over Wikipedia", but an attempt to add balance to articles about disputed issues. In 2011, Wikipedia co-founder Jimmy Wales said of the reported course, that Wikipedia had seen "absolutely no impact from that effort whatsoever". Wales, who himself is a supporter of Israel, insists on neutrality when editing articles related to Israel and the Israeli-Palestinian conflict. At a speech at Tel Aviv University, when accepting his Dan David Prize in May 2015, Wales insisted to avoid conflicts of interest is to provide as many facts as possible while maintaining neutrality, aiming to overwhelm any chance of bias and imbuing political ideology.

=== 2011 protests ===
On 29 July 2011, the movement expressed its support for the social justice protests but disapproved of the heads of the protest. My Israel defined the leaders as conscientious objectors and post-Zionist leftists who publicly speak against IDF soldiers. On 3 August 2011 the movement's activists participated in a demonstration near the protest encampment in Rothschild Avenue. They joined Im Tirtzu, Bnei Akiva, and other right-wing activists, and called for lowering the costs of living while expressing their support for Prime Minister Benjamin Netanyahu. On 1 September 2011, the movement published an online letter from 2002, which includes Daphni Leef's signature, stating that the signatories refused to "serve the occupation."
