= Eitan Ginzburg =

Israeli politician

- Ginzburg in 2026

Ministerial roles
- 2021: Minister of Communications

Faction represented in the Knesset
- 2019–2022: Blue and White
- 2025–2026: Blue and White
- 2026–: Together

Other roles
- 2018: Mayor of Ra'anana

Personal details
- Born: 25 January 1977 (age 49) La Plata, Argentina

Eitan Ginzburg (Hebrew: איתן גינזבורג; born 25 January 1977) is an Israeli politician who currently serves as a Member of the Knesset for Together and was previously an MK for Blue and White from 2019 until 2022 and from 2025 until 2026. The first openly gay mayor in Israel when he became mayor of Ra'anana in 2018, he was elected to the Knesset the following year and served as Minister of Communications in 2021.

== Biography ==
Ginzburg was born in La Plata in Argentina. When he was eighteen months old, his family emigrated to Israel, initially settling in kibbutz Or HaNer, before moving to Ra'anana when he was aged ten. After being educated at Ostrovsky high school, he carried out his national service in the Israel Defense Forces in the Military Police Corps, reaching the rank of major by the time of his discharge in 1999.

Ginzburg went on to earn an LLB and a BA in government at the Interdisciplinary Center Herzliya and an MA in political science at Tel Aviv University. In the early 2000s he was amongst the founders of the Yisrael Aheret party, and he was second on its list for the 2003 Knesset elections, but the party failed to win a seat. However, in the municipal elections later in the year, he became the youngest-ever person elected to Ra'anana city council when he was elected on the Independent List for Ra'anana headed by Ze'ev Bielski. Between 2007 and 2008 he was an advisor to Deputy Minister of Defence Matan Vilnai.

In the 2008 municipal elections he headed the Labor Party list in the city, and was re-elected for another term. From 2010 he served as deputy and acting mayor. He switched back to Bielski's list for the 2013 elections. When Bielski resigned as mayor in March 2018, Ginzburg was elected by city councillors to serve as his replacement until the October 2018 elections, becoming the country's first openly gay mayor. However, the October elections saw him lose to Haim Broide in the second round, receiving 42% of the vote.

In 2019 Ginzburg joined the new Israel Resilience Party. After the party became part of the Blue and White alliance, he was given the thirty-second slot on the joint list, and was subsequently elected to the Knesset as the alliance won 35 seats. In May 2021 he was appointed Minister of Communications.

The Israel Resilience Party was part of the National Unity alliance for the 2022 elections and Ginzburg was placed fourteenth on the alliance's list. However, it won only 12 seats. Ginzburg re-entered the Knesset in July 2025 after Gadi Eisenkot's resignation.

On 5 May 2026 Ginzburg announced his exit from Blue and White in search of "another political framework" as the party has failed to clear the electoral threshold in the 2026 election polling.

On 5 August 2026 Naftali Bennett announced Ginzburg would run on his Together slate during the 2026 Israeli legislative election. He was elected to the Knesset after being placed in the eighth slot on the alliance list. Ginzburg was appointed by Bennett on 30 October as the party's faction chair in the 26th Knesset, ahead of the swearing in on 10 November.
