= Michal Hirsch Negri =

Israeli educator and public administrator

Michal Hirsch Negri מיכל הירש נגרי
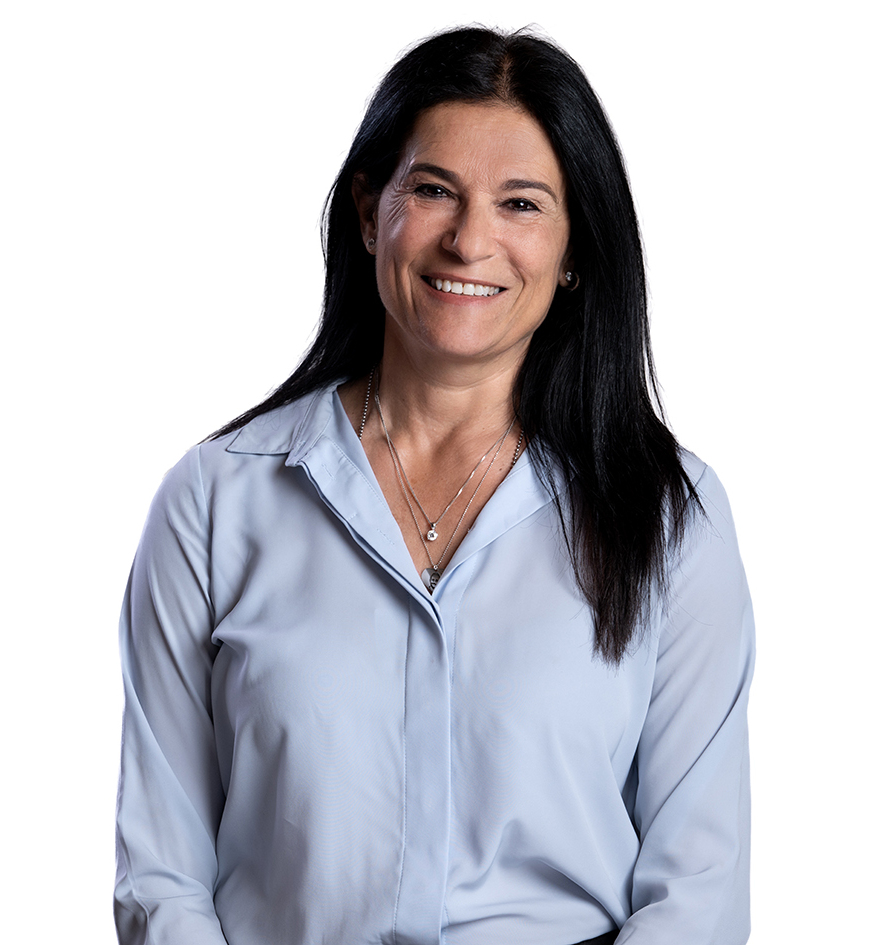

Member of the Knesset
- In office 2026-

Personal details
- Born: 29 July 1966 (age 60) Jerusalem, Israel
- Party: Together
- Children: 3
- Occupation: Educator, public administrator

Michal Talia Hirsch Negri (Hebrew: מיכל הירש נגרי; born 29 July 1966) is an Israeli educator, public administrator and politician who serves as a member of the Knesset for Together. She served as director-general of the Ra'anana Municipality from 2013 to 2018, having previously headed the municipality's education administration.

== Early life and education ==
Hirsch Negri was born in Jerusalem in 1966, the middle of three daughters. At the age of nine, she moved with her family to Belgium as part of a mission on behalf of the Jewish Agency for Israel. During her military service in the Israel Defense Forces, she served in a Nahal group affiliated with the Hebrew Scouts Movement in Israel.

Hirsch Negri holds a bachelor's degree in education, specializing in English, from Kibbutzim College, including a teaching certificate, and a master's degree with honors in educational administration from Bar-Ilan University. She is a 2018 graduate of the Wexner Foundation's Senior Leadership Program at the Harvard Kennedy School.

== Professional career ==
Hirsch Negri began her professional career in teaching and school administration. From 1992 to 2002, she served as deputy principal of Ben-Gurion Junior High School in Herzliya. Between 2003 and 2006, she headed Ben-Zvi Junior High School in Kfar Saba and Ilan Ramon Junior High School in Kokhav Ya'ir–Tsur Yig'al.

In 2006, Hirsch Negri was appointed head of the education administration of the Ra'anana Municipality. During her tenure, the percentage of students eligible for a matriculation certificate increased by 15 percentage points, the school dropout rate fell to 1%, and in 2012 Ra'anana was recognized as Israel's first experimental city in the field of education.

In 2011, she was additionally appointed deputy director-general of the municipality. From 2013 to 2018, she served as the municipality's director-general, becoming the first woman to hold the position.

As director-general, she implemented a comprehensive municipal strategic plan that included organizational restructuring, digital transformation and a program to improve municipal services in cooperation with the community. During her tenure, the city received several national awards, including a national education award recognizing its inclusion of diverse populations and training of educational staff, a national volunteerism award and the Minister of the Interior's Award for Social Responsibility. Hirsch Negri herself received the Roni Feinstein Foundation Award for Municipal Entrepreneurship in 2014.

Following her departure from the municipality, Hirsch Negri co-founded EDU NOW with former education minister Rabbi Shai Piron. The company provides consulting and support services in education, social affairs and community development.

She has also served as professional director of the municipal chief executives program at Mekomot, an initiative associated with the Israeli Ministry of the Interior.

In 2020, Kfar Saba mayor Rafi Saar appointed an external committee to advance education in the city, co-chaired by Piron and Hirsch Negri.

== Political and social activities ==
Hirsch Negri has been active in promoting women's representation in senior public-sector positions through the "51%" initiative. As a board member of the Association of Municipal Directors-General and Secretaries, she represented female municipal executives on a committee dedicated to advancing women in the public sector.

She is also a board member of Pnima, an Israeli organization working to bridge divisions within Israeli society.

Her son, Major Roy Negri, served as a team commander in the IDF's Counter-Terrorism Unit and later managed the unit's nonprofit association. Following his death during the Battle of Be'eri on October 7 2023, Hirsch Negri joined the association's board of directors.

Since her son's death, she has also participated in the Mitgaysim LeAchdut ("Enlisting for Unity") forum, advocating more equal participation in military service and opposing exemptions from conscription for Haredi men.

In the April 2019 Israeli legislative election, Hirsch Negri was placed seventh on the electoral list of Gesher, which failed to cross the electoral threshold.

In June 2026, she joined the Together political alliance and became one of its candidates for the 2026 Israeli legislative election. She has called on leaders to take responsibility for the failures that led to the October 7 attacks and pledged to form a state commission of inquiry, while also calling for the country to have a "new leadership" that "sees the people".

She was elected to the Knesset after the alliance won 12 seats, with Hirsch Negri in the seventh slot.

== Personal life ==
Hirsch Negri resides in Herzliya. She is married and has three children, two daughters and a son. Her son, Major Roy Negri, was killed during the fighting in Be'eri on 7 October 2023.
