= Naftali Bennett =

Prime Minister of Israel from 2021 to 2022

- נפתלי בנט
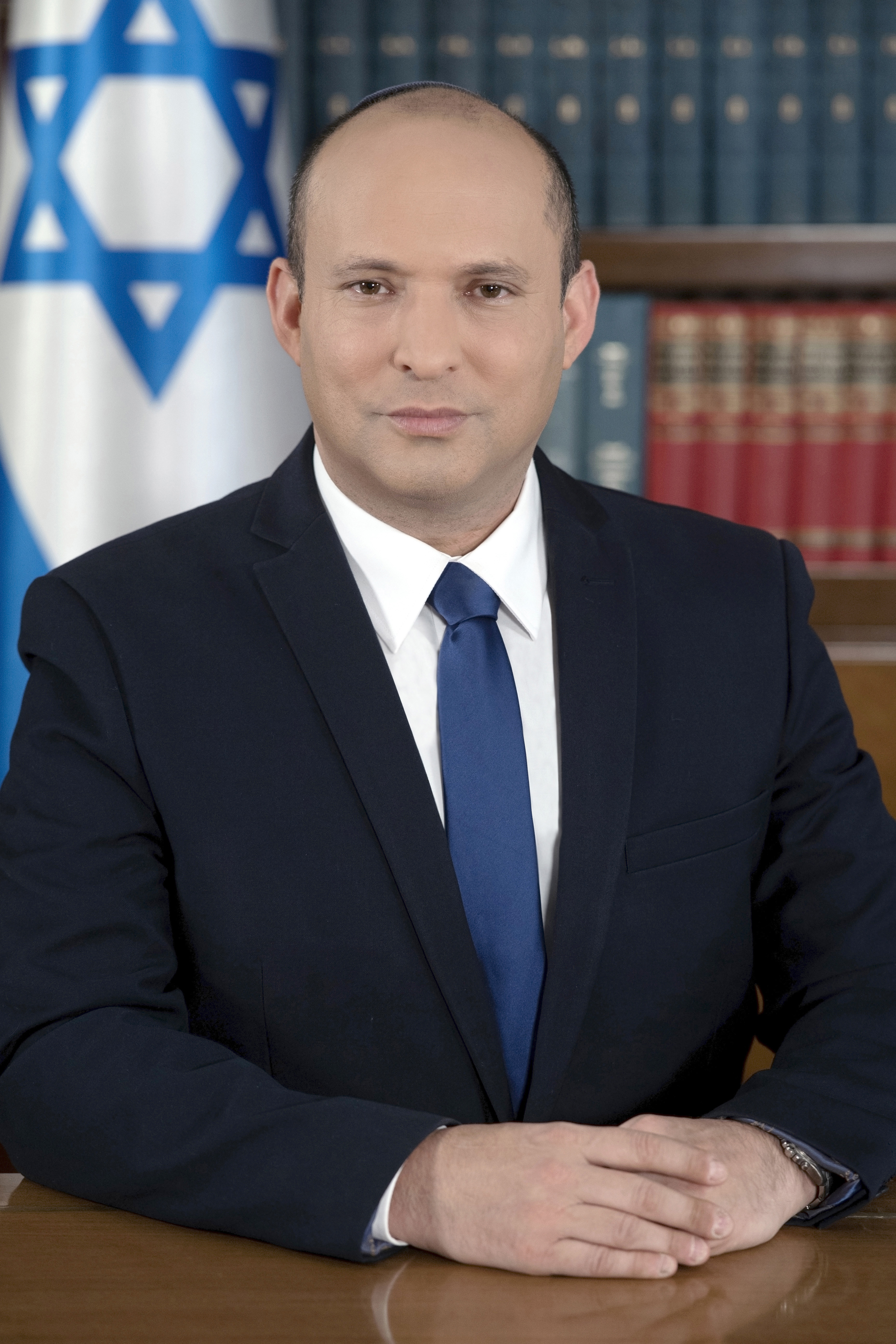
- Official portrait, 2021

Prime Minister of Israel
- In office 13 June 2021 – 30 June 2022
- President: Reuven Rivlin; Isaac Herzog
- Alternate: Yair Lapid
- Preceded by: Benjamin Netanyahu
- Succeeded by: Yair Lapid

Alternate Prime Minister of Israel
- In office 1 July 2022 – 8 November 2022
- Prime Minister: Yair Lapid
- Preceded by: Yair Lapid
- Succeeded by: Vacant
Ministerial positions
Minister of Community Affairs
In office 13 June 2021 – 8 November 2022
| Prime Minister | Himself; Yair Lapid |
| Preceded by | Office established |
| Succeeded by | Office abolished |
Minister of Defence
In office 8 November 2019 – 17 May 2020
| Prime Minister | Benjamin Netanyahu |
| Preceded by | Benjamin Netanyahu |
| Succeeded by | Benny Gantz |
Minister of Education
In office 14 May 2015 – 2 June 2019
| Prime Minister | Benjamin Netanyahu |
| Preceded by | Shai Piron |
| Succeeded by | Rafi Peretz |
Minister of Diaspora Affairs
In office 29 April 2013 – 2 June 2015
| Prime Minister | Benjamin Netanyahu |
| Preceded by | Benjamin Netanyahu |
| Succeeded by | Tzipi Livni |
Minister of Religious Services
In office 18 March 2013 – 14 May 2017
| Prime Minister | Benjamin Netanyahu |
| Preceded by | Ya'akov Margi |
| Succeeded by | David Azulai |
Minister of Economy
In office 23 January 2013 – 14 May 2017
| Prime Minister | Benjamin Netanyahu |
| Preceded by | Shalom Simhon |
| Succeeded by | Aryeh Deri |
Party leadership offices
Leader of New Right
Incumbent
Assumed office 29 December 2018
| Preceded by | Position established |
Leader of Yamina
In office 15 January 2020 – 30 June 2022
| Preceded by | Ayelet Shaked |
| Succeeded by | Ayelet Shaked |
Leader of the Jewish Home
In office 5 November 2012 – 29 December 2018
| Preceded by | Daniel Hershkowitz |
| Succeeded by | Rafi Peretz |
Factions represented in the Knesset
| 2013–2018 | The Jewish Home |
| 2018–2019 | New Right |
| 2019 | Yamina |
| 2019–2020 | New Right |
| 2026– | Together |

Personal details
- Born: 25 March 1972 (age 54) Haifa, Israel
- Party: Likud (2005–2008); The Jewish Home (2012–2018); New Right (2018–2022); Bennett 2026 (since 2025)
- Other political affiliations: Yamina (2019; 2020–2022); Together (since 2026)
- Spouse: Gilat Einav (m. 1999)
- Children: 4
- Education: Hebrew University of Jerusalem (LLB)
- Occupation: Politician; businessman; soldier
- Website: naftalibennett.co.il

Military service
- Branch/service: Israel Defense Forces
- Years of service: 1990–1996
- Rank: Rav seren (Major)
- Unit: Sayeret Matkal; Maglan
- Battles/wars: First Intifada; South Lebanon conflict (1985–2000); Second Intifada; 2006 Lebanon War

Naftali Bennett (Hebrew: נַפְתָּלִי בֶּנֶט; born 25 March 1972) is an Israeli politician who serves as a member of the Knesset for Together, an alliance between Bennett 2026 and Yesh Atid, since November 2026. He is also a businessman and soldier who served as the prime minister of Israel from 2021 to 2022, and as the alternate prime minister from July to November 2022. Bennett has served as the head of Bennett 2026 since 2025 and was the leader of the New Right party from 2018 to 2022. He previously led the religious Zionist and far-right political party The Jewish Home between 2012 and 2018.

The son of immigrants from the United States, Bennett was born and raised in Haifa. Bennett served in the Sayeret Matkal and Maglan special forces units of the Israel Defense Forces, commanding many combat operations, and subsequently became a software entrepreneur. In 1999, he co-founded and co-owned the US company Cyota. The company was sold in 2005 for $145 million. He was also CEO of Soluto, an Israeli cloud computing service, that sold in 2013 for a reported $100–130 million.

Bennett entered politics in 2006 as Chief of Staff for Benjamin Netanyahu until 2008. From 2010 to 2012, he was the director of the Yesha Council. In 2011, together with Ayelet Shaked, he co-founded the My Israel extra-parliamentary movement. In 2012, Bennett was elected as the party leader of The Jewish Home. In the 2013 Knesset election, the first contested by The Jewish Home under Bennett's leadership, the party won 12 seats in the Knesset. He served under Prime Minister Benjamin Netanyahu as Minister of Economy and Religious Services from 2013 to 2015, before being appointed Minister of Education in 2015. In December 2018, Bennett left The Jewish Home to form the New Right party. After he lost his Knesset seat in the April 2019 Knesset election, he was dismissed by Netanyahu as Education Minister in June 2019. He regained his seat in the September 2019 Knesset election, representing the New Right (now a member of the Yamina alliance), and was appointed Minister of Defense, before leaving the position the following year.

In the 2021 Knesset election, Yamina under Bennett's leadership won 7 seats. On 2 June 2021, Bennett agreed to a rotation government with Yair Lapid, whereby Bennett would serve as Israel's prime minister until 2023, after which Lapid would assume the role until 2025. Bennett was sworn in on 13 June 2021. On 20 June 2022, following failures of the coalition to pass bills in the Knesset, Bennett announced he would call for a vote to dissolve the Knesset and step down as prime minister after the dissolution, to be succeeded by Lapid. On 29 June, he announced that he would not seek re-election in the 2022 Israeli legislative election. Lapid succeeded him as prime minister on 1 July 2022, while Bennett succeeded Lapid as the Alternate Prime Minister. He announced his resignation as alternative prime minister on 6 November, which became effective on 8 November. Bennett registered a new political party in April 2025 under the placeholder name Bennett 2026. In April 2026, Bennett 2026 formed a new political alliance with Yesh Atid named Together.

== Early life ==
Bennett was born in Haifa, Israel, on 25 March 1972. He is the youngest of three sons born to Jim and Myrna (née Lefko) Bennett, American-Jewish immigrants who moved to Israel from San Francisco in July 1967. Both his parents were from Ashkenazi Jewish backgrounds. His father's ancestors were from Poland, Germany, and the Netherlands. Bennett's paternal great-great-great-grandfather Julius Salomonson was from Łobżenica, Poland, and arrived in San Francisco in 1851 during the California Gold Rush. His mother's ancestors lived in Russia and Poland, and her parents immigrated to the United States prior to World War II. They later moved to Israel, joining their daughter's family there, and settled on Vitkin Street in Haifa, close to where Bennett and his brothers grew up. Some of his mother's family members who remained in Poland were murdered in the Holocaust.

Bennett's parents were raised in non-Orthodox Jewish homes and were progressive activists during the 1960s. His father was arrested while taking part in a Civil rights movement sit-in protest in 1964. They later began to observe Modern Orthodox Judaism and embraced right-wing Israeli politics. After moving to Israel in 1967, they volunteered for a few months at kibbutz Dafna, where they studied the Hebrew language, then settled in the Ahuza neighborhood of Haifa. Jim Bennett found a job in the Technion, working for its fundraising team, and became a successful real estate broker and real estate entrepreneur. Myrna Bennett was the deputy director general of the Association of Americans and Canadians in Israel's northern region.

In the summer of 1973, when Bennett was one year old, the family returned to San Francisco at the urging of his mother. With the outbreak of the Yom Kippur War in October 1973, Jim Bennett returned to Israel to fight in the Israel Defense Forces, serving in an artillery unit on the Golan Heights front. Following the war, the rest of the family returned to Israel at his request as he was held in reserve duty for months after the war. Bennett's parents ultimately decided to stay permanently in Israel.

In 1976, when Bennett was four years old, the family moved to Montreal for two years as part of his father's job. In Montreal he attended a Chabad preschool, which he credited with influencing his family in turning towards religious observance. After returning to Haifa, Bennett attended Carmel elementary school. When he was in second grade, the family moved to Teaneck, New Jersey for two years, again as part of his father's job. While living in New Jersey, Bennett attended Yavneh Academy. The family returned to Haifa when Bennett was ten. During Bennett's childhood, he visited San Francisco on family vacations nearly every summer. Bennett attended Yavne Yeshiva High School in Haifa and became a group leader (madrich) in the religious Zionist youth movement Bnei Akiva.

Bennett has two brothers; they are Asher, a former Israeli Navy submarine officer and businessman based in the United Kingdom, and Daniel, an accountant for Zim Integrated Shipping Services.

=== Military service ===
Bennett was drafted into the Israel Defense Forces in 1990. He served in the elite Sayeret Matkal commando unit, and after his regular service was selected for officer training. He was given a choice of remaining in Sayeret Matkal but as a regular operator rather than a commander or transferring to the Maglan commando unit to receive a command position and chose to transfer to Maglan. He became a company commander in the Maglan unit.

Bennett was discharged from active service after six years but continued to serve in the reserves and attained the rank of major. During the time that Bennett was living in the United States and building his career as a software entrepreneur, he repeatedly traveled to Israel to do reserve duty. Bennett served during the First Intifada and in the Israeli security zone in Lebanon during the 1982–2000 South Lebanon conflict. He commanded many operations. Among other missions, he served as an officer in Operation Grapes of Wrath.

After his regular IDF service, Bennett received a law degree from the Hebrew University of Jerusalem. During the Second Intifada, he participated in Operation Defensive Shield.

He was called up as a reservist in the Maglan special forces unit during the 2006 Lebanon War and participated in a search and destroy mission behind enemy lines, operating against Hezbollah rocket launchers.

One of Bennett's actions as a commando officer became highly controversial. During Operation Grapes of Wrath, while leading a force of 67 Maglan soldiers operating in southern Lebanon, Bennett radioed for support after his unit came under mortar fire. The IDF launched an artillery barrage to cover his force, and the shelling hit a United Nations compound in which civilians were taking refuge, an incident that became known as the Qana massacre. A total of 106 Lebanese civilians were killed.

The incident resulted in a wave of international condemnation, and the subsequent diplomatic pressure caused Israel to end Operation Grapes of Wrath sooner than planned. Journalist Yigal Sarna, writing in Israeli national tabloid Yedioth Ahronoth, argued that Bennett displayed "poor judgement" during the operation. Sarna wrote that "Bennett led a force of 67 combat troops into Lebanon. At a certain point, he decided to ignore orders and change operational plans, without coordinating these moves with his superiors, who in his mind were cowardly, and not steadfast enough. Near the village of Kfar Kana, Bennett's troops were caught in an ambush."

Citing a "senior army figure", journalist Raviv Drucker said that Bennett's radio call for support after his unit came under fire was "hysterical" and contributed to the loss of life which occurred. Bennett responded: "I have now been subjected to an attack claiming that I am 'responsible for the massacre in Kfar Kana.' Heroism will not be investigated. Keep looking in the archives. My military file is available for viewing, and it's waiting for you." Former members of Bennett's unit wrote a letter defending him, saying: "Naftali ... led many successful operations that led to the elimination of Hezbollah terrorists deep in enemy territory." Other officers involved in the operation, including one who was Bennett's deputy during the Qana incident, also denied that he had changed plans without consulting his superiors.

In October 2023, immediately following the start of the Gaza war, Bennett enlisted to do reserve duty, serving in the emergency storage unit of the IDF's Technological and Logistics Directorate.

=== Business career ===
In 1999, Bennett co-founded Cyota, an anti-fraud software company, and became its CEO. He moved to New York City in 2000 to oversee Cyota's corporate development, settling on the Upper East Side of Manhattan, and lived there for four years. In 2005, the company was sold to RSA Security for $145 million, making Bennett a multimillionaire. A stipulation of the deal allowed the Israeli arm of Cyota to remain intact. As of 2013, 400 Israelis were employed at the company's Israeli offices in Beersheba and Herzliya.

Bennett was the CEO of Soluto, a technology company providing cloud-based service that enables remote support for personal computers and mobile devices in 2009, at a time when he and partner Lior Golan were engaged in raising funds for myriad Israeli technology startup companies. Soluto had hitherto raised $20 million from investors, including venture capital funds Giza Venture Capital, Proxima Ventures, Bessemer Venture Partners, Index Ventures, Michael Arrington's CrunchFund, and Eric Schmidt's Innovation Endeavors and Initial Capital. The sale of Soluto for a reported $100–130 million to the American company Asurion was finalized in October 2013.

In June 2021, Forbes Israel reported that Bennett was expected to make $5 million from his investment in the American fintech company Payoneer. Bennett invested several hundred thousand dollars in the company before entering politics. Payoneer is set to list on the Nasdaq stock exchange with a $3.3 billion valuation after reaching a SPAC merger with FTAC Olympus Acquisition Corp in February 2021.

== Political career ==
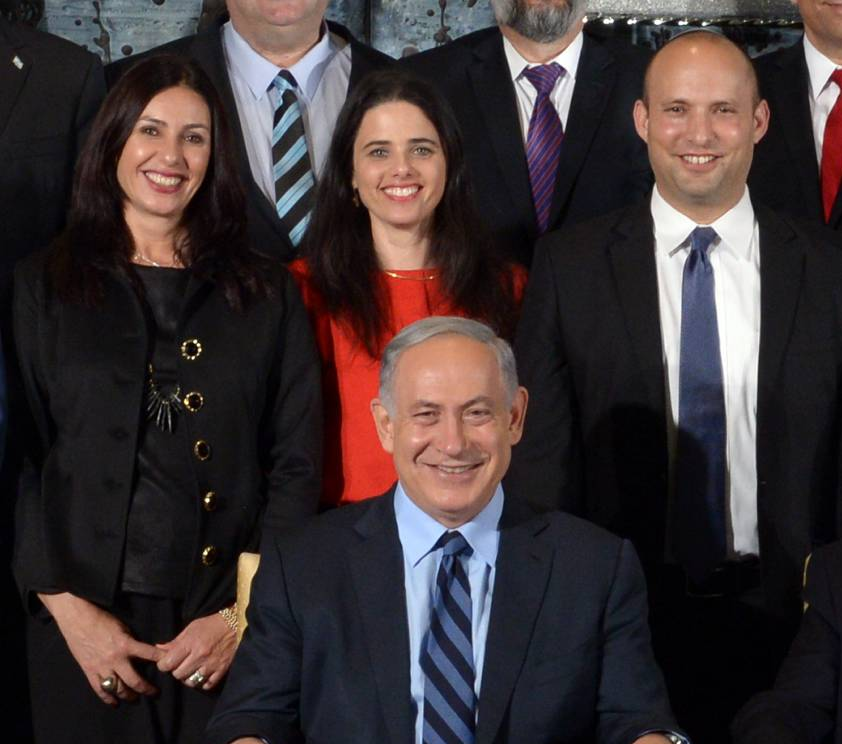
Minister of Education Naftali Bennett (right) with Minister of Justice Ayelet Shaked (above center), Minister of Culture Miri Regev (left), and Prime Minister Benjamin Netanyahu (below center)

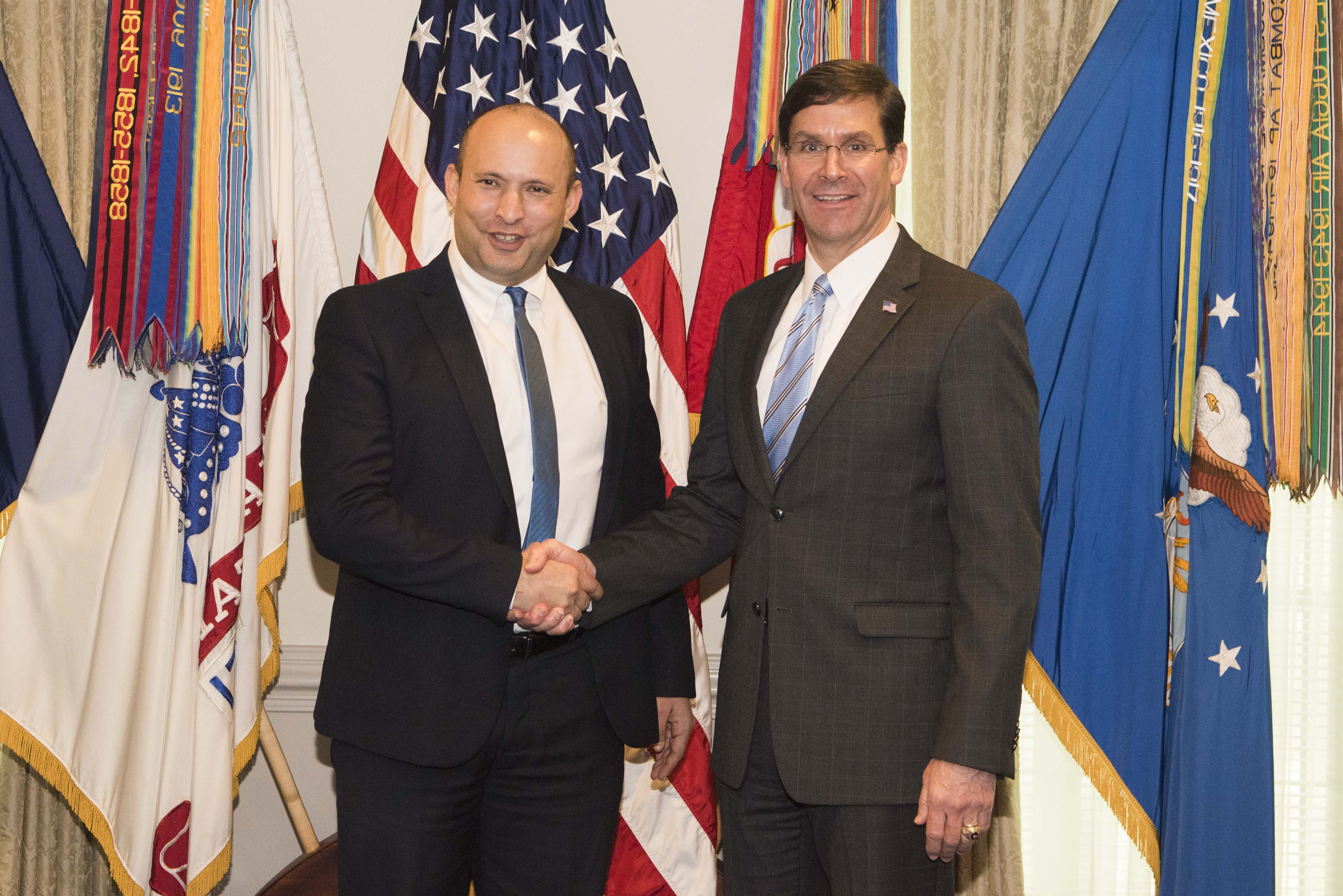
Bennett with U.S. Defense Secretary Mark Esper in February 2020

From 2010 to 2012, Bennett served as the director of the Yesha Council. In April 2011, together with Ayelet Shaked, he co-founded My Israel, which claims to have 94,000 Israeli members. In April 2012, he founded a movement named Yisraelim ("Israelis"). The movement's main goals include increasing Zionism among centre-right supporters, increasing dialogue between the religious and secular communities, and promoting "The Israel Stability Initiative."

Bennett was elected the leader of The Jewish Home party in 2012. He was reelected as the party's leader in 2015 and 2017.

Following his election to the Knesset, and before he could take his seat, Bennett had to renounce his U.S. citizenship, which he held as the son of American parents. He was appointed Minister of Economy and Minister of Religious Services in March 2013. In April 2013, he was also appointed Minister of Jerusalem and Diaspora Affairs.

After being reelected in the 2015 Knesset election, Bennett was appointed Minister of Education and retained the Diaspora Affairs portfolio in the new government. In May 2015, Netanyahu split the Ministry of Jerusalem and Diaspora Affairs, initially taking back the Jerusalem Affairs portfolio for himself. He later appointed Ze'ev Elkin to the role of Jerusalem Affairs Minister. As Minister of Education, Bennett issued an official order prohibiting school principals from inviting members of Breaking the Silence and other organizations that denounce Israel's military conduct in the West Bank.

In October 2015, Bennett resigned from the Knesset in order to allow Shuli Mualem to take his seat. His resignation took place under the Norwegian Law, which allowed ministers to resign their seats when in the cabinet but return to the Knesset if they leave the government. He returned to the Knesset on 6 December after Avi Wortzman opted to vacate his seat, having temporarily had to resign as a minister in order to do so.

Following Avigdor Lieberman's resignation as Defense Minister in November 2018, Bennett announced that he was seeking the position for himself. On 16 November 2018, a Likud party spokesman announced that Netanyahu had rejected Bennett's request and that Netanyahu himself would take the position instead. It was then announced that Bennett's Jewish Home party would no longer be affiliated with Netanyahu's government. On 19 November, Bennett reneged on his pledge to withdraw from Netanyahu's coalition.

In December 2018, Bennett was among the Jewish Home MKs to leave the party and form the breakaway New Right party. In the April 2019 Knesset election, New Right narrowly failed to cross the electoral threshold; as a result, Bennett did not gain a seat in the 21st Knesset. In June 2019, he left the government after Netanyahu dismissed Bennett from his positions as Education and Diaspora Affairs Minister.

After the Knesset dissolved and a second election in 2019 was called for September, the New Right formed an electoral alliance with the Jewish Home and National Union-Tkuma, named the United Right which was later renamed Yamina, and was led by Ayelet Shaked. The list won seven seats in the election, and Bennett regained his Knesset seat. In November 2019, Bennett rejoined Netanyahu's government as Minister of Defense. After briefly dissolving, the Yamina alliance was reunified in January 2020 ahead of the 2020 Knesset election, with Bennett succeeding Ayelet Shaked as the new leader of the alliance. Yamina won six seats in that election.

In May 2020, with negotiations taking place between Netanyahu and Benny Gantz (leader of the centrist Blue and White alliance) to form a new government, Yamina announced that it would go into the opposition, ending Bennett's tenure as Defense Minister. The day before, Rafi Peretz, the leader of The Jewish Home, had split from the alliance, and would be named as the Minister of Jerusalem in the thirty-fifth government of Israel. On 17 May, Bennett met with Gantz, who also succeeded him as Defense Minister, and declared that Yamina was now a "head held high" member of the opposition. Tkuma, which rebranded as the Religious Zionist Party on 7 January 2021, split from Yamina on 20 January. In spite of this, Yamina won seven seats in the 2021 Knesset election in March.

== Prime minister of Israel (2021–2022) ==
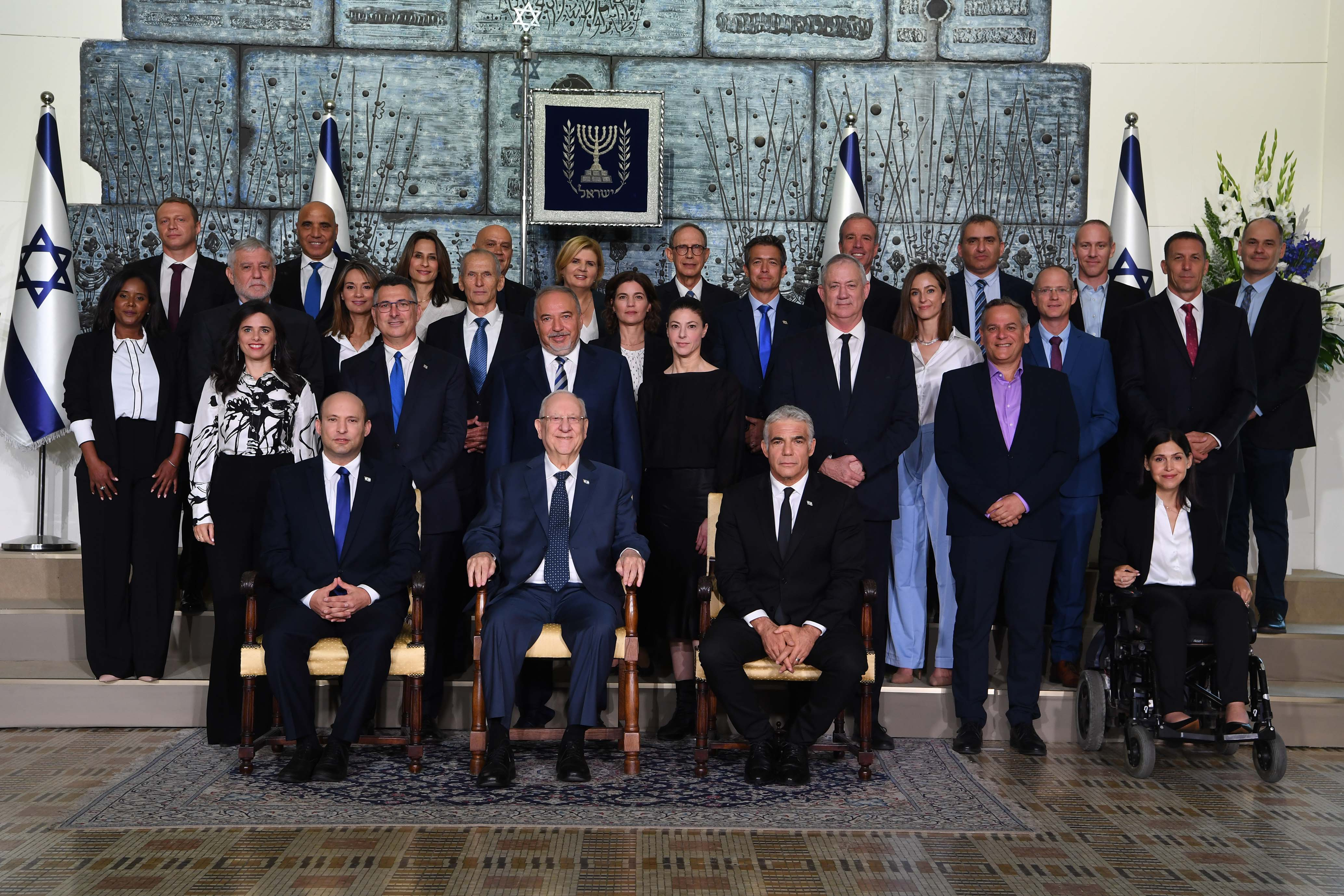
Bennett and his Cabinet with President Reuven Rivlin, June 2021

On 9 May 2021, it was reported that Bennett and Leader of the Opposition and Yesh Atid leader Yair Lapid had made major headway in coalition talks for forming a new Israeli government which would oust Prime Minister Benjamin Netanyahu. On 30 May, Bennett announced that he would be prime minister in a rotation government until August 2023, at which point Lapid would take over as prime minister until 2025. Bennett was sworn in on 13 June, ending Netanyahu's 12-year tenure in office. He is Israel's first kippah-wearing prime minister.

On the fast of 9th of Av, 2021, as hundreds of Jews went to mourn on the temple mount, where it was forbidden for them to pray, Bennett wrote: "The Jewish people twice had a Jewish state on the Land of Israel, and both times we did not succeed to complete the eighth decade as an independent state, because of internal wars and baseless hatred ... At the time of the Roman siege on Jerusalem, the nation was divided, each group entrenched itself in its own position, and burned the food stores of the others, as part of the internal power struggle, so the Romans had a much easier task. The bitter end we all know, and until today every year on this date we mourn the awful destruction which a people with a little more baseless love, restraint, and listening, could have saved us from."

Upon the government's formation in June 2021, it held 61 seats in the Knesset; all these members of the Knesset (MK) came from coalition parties excluding Yamina's Amichai Chikli. On 6 April 2022, Yamina MK Idit Silman, resigned from the coalition, causing the governing coalition to lose its majority in the Knesset. On 13 June, Yamina MK Nir Orbach left the coalition, arguing that left-wing members of the coalition were holding it hostage. Several days later, on 20 June, Bennett and Lapid announced the introduction of a bill to dissolve the Knesset in a joint statement, stating that Lapid would become the interim prime minister following the dissolution. The Knesset was dissolved on the night of 30 June, ending Bennett's term as prime minister.

=== COVID-19 pandemic ===
At the time of Bennett's assumption of office, the COVID-19 pandemic in Israel had somewhat subsided, with a low national infection rate and with 55% of the Israeli population having received two or more COVID-19 vaccines. Within ten days of his assumption of office, Israel underwent an outbreak of the Delta variant. In response, Bennett encouraged renewed social distancing, and the vaccination of all children aged twelve and above. In addition, he reached a deal with Pfizer to provide previously purchased vaccines before their intended delivery date to ensure the accessibility of the vaccine, and to provide additional vaccines in case a second booster shot becomes necessary. Following the variant's continued spread, a second booster shot and third overall shot was approved by the government on 1 August 2021 for all individuals aged 60 or older, which was expanded on 29 August to all adults.

Israel experienced a surge in COVID cases beginning in late November 2021. By December, the first cases of the Omicron variant were being reported in the country, the government responded by restricting air travel to the country and encouraging the vaccination of children and teenagers. On 2 January 2022, following an additional surge in late December, a third booster shot, and a fourth overall shot, was approved by the government for all individuals aged 60 or older. Cases grew at a steady pace through January and began to decrease, stabilizing again in March before continuing to fall. Israel ended its mask mandate in late April.

=== Foreign policy ===
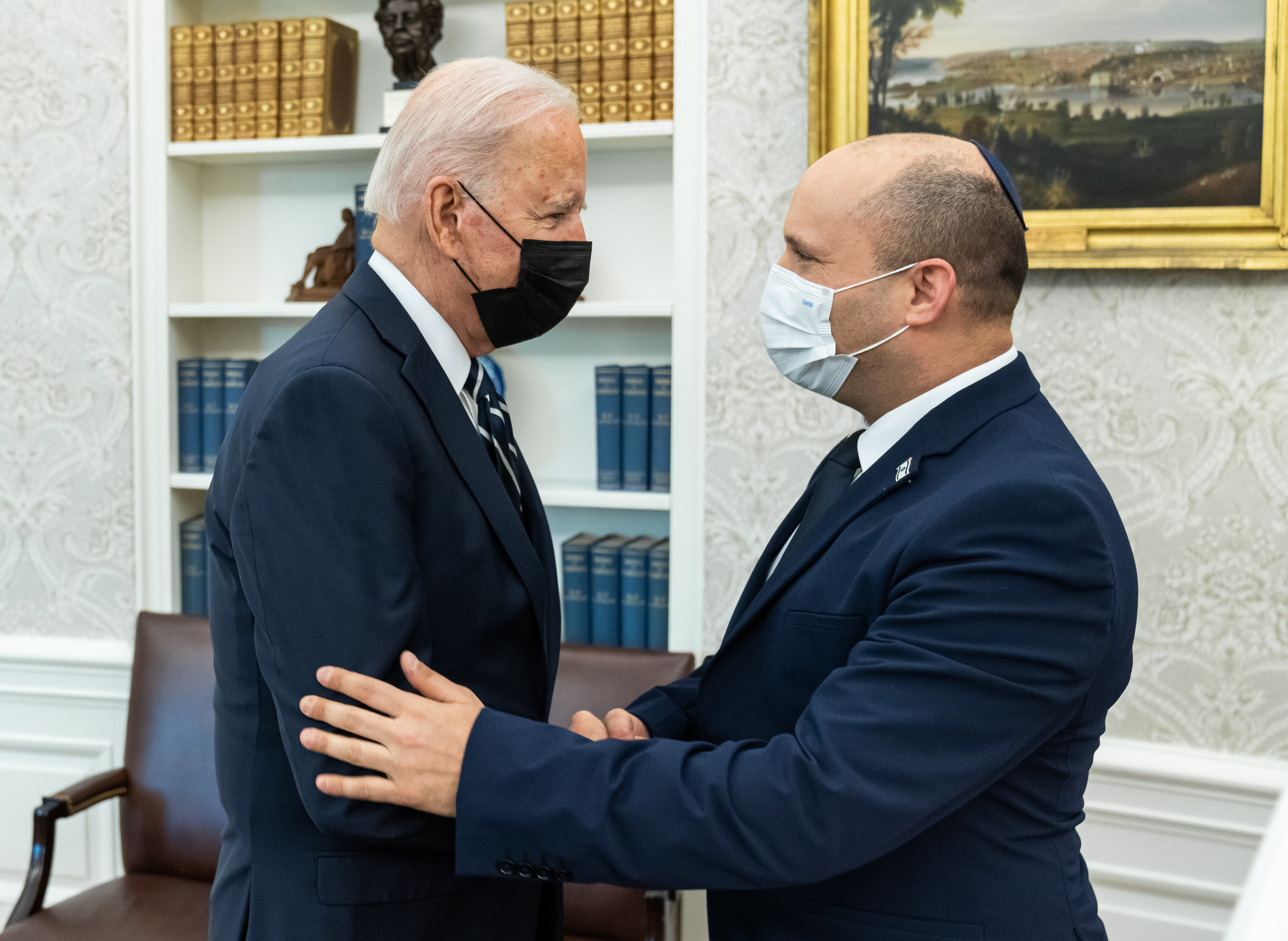
Bennett with US President Joe Biden, August 2021

King Mohammed VI of Morocco sent a special congratulatory letter to Prime Minister Bennett upon his taking office. Bennett responded that he would "work to reinforce Israeli-Moroccan relations in all areas". Israel and Morocco restored diplomatic relations on 10 December 2020, as part of the Israel–Morocco normalization agreement involving the United States, which at the same time recognized Morocco's sovereignty over the disputed territory of Western Sahara. In August 2021, the two parties agreed to enter formal diplomatic relations, and to open embassies in Tel Aviv and Marrakesh respectively.

That month, Bennett made his first visit to the United States, where he met Secretary of State Antony Blinken, Secretary of Defense Lloyd Austin, and AIPAC CEO Howard Kohr. He subsequently met President Joe Biden on 27 August 2021. In this meeting, Bennett described Israel's strategy against Iran as "a death by a thousand cuts".

On 27 September, Bennett addressed the general assembly of the United Nations in his first speech there. He talked about fighting the COVID-19 pandemic and combatting political polarization. In addition, Bennett denounced Iran's alleged state-sponsored terrorism, which he argued brought harm not only to Israel but also to many countries in the Middle East. He warned of Iran's efforts to acquire nuclear weapons, stating that Israel would not allow it.

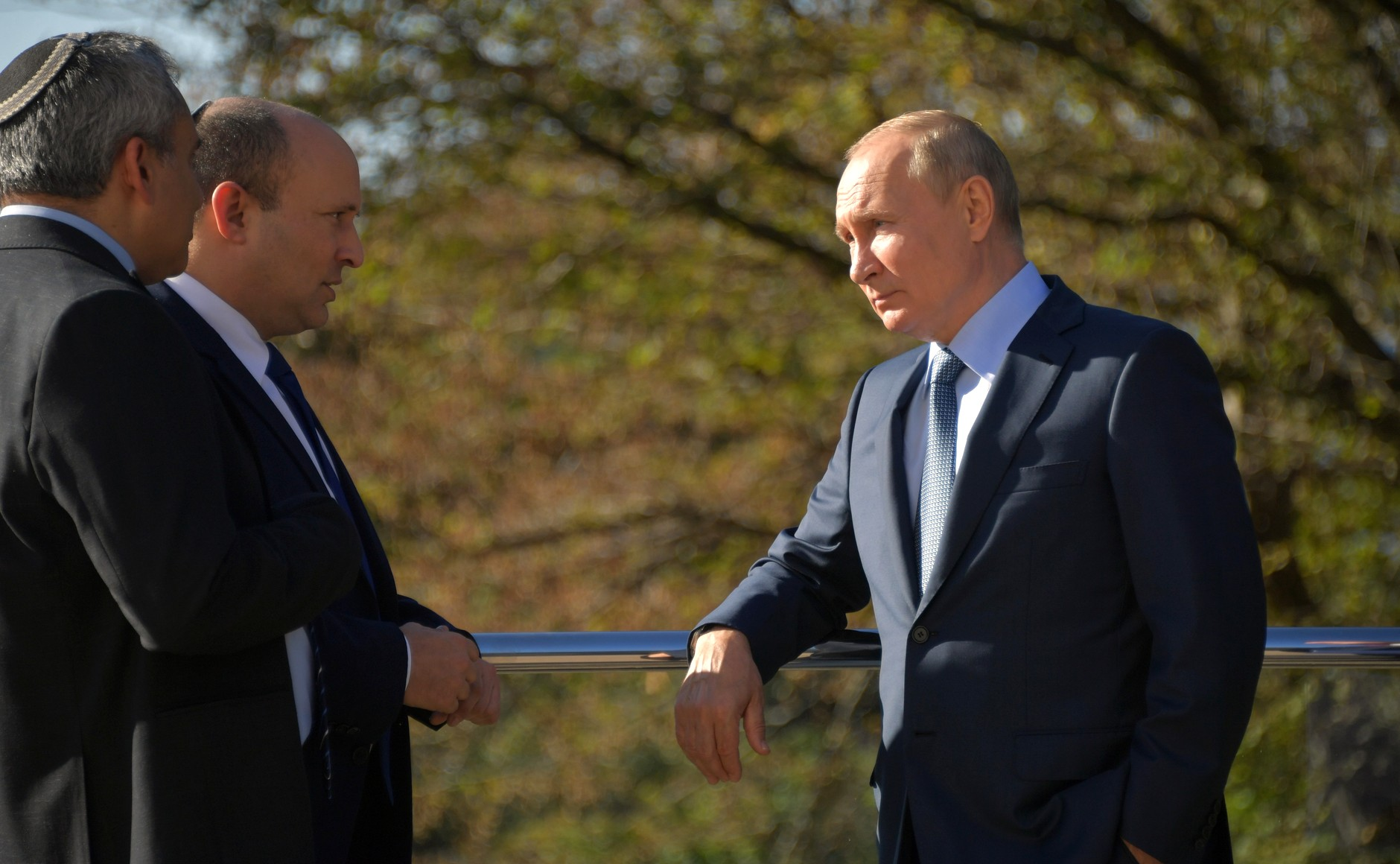
Bennett with Russian President Vladimir Putin, October 2021

On 12 December, he visited the United Arab Emirates in the first visit of the country by an Israeli Prime Minister, meeting with then crown prince of the Emirate of Abu Dhabi, Mohamed bin Zayed. On 14 February 2022 he visited Manama, marking the first time an Israeli Prime Minister officially visited Bahrain.

On 5 March 2022, Bennett met with Russian President Vladimir Putin in order to discuss the Russian invasion of Ukraine in a meeting coordinated with the United States, France, and Germany. The Kremlin stated that Bennett had offered to mediate between Putin and Ukrainian president Volodymyr Zelenskyy. Bennett then flew on the same day to Germany to brief German chancellor Olaf Scholz, updated French President Macron by telephone, and spoke with Zelenskyy twice in the evening, but few details were disclosed publicly. According to Al Monitor, the meetings were instigated by Scholz who made a lightning visit to Israel on 3 March and held a long one-on-one meeting, which resulted in the mediation idea. Natan Sharansky, former head of the Jewish Agency for Israel, criticised Bennett, saying he was afraid to call out Putin by name for war crimes, and said Israel should provide defensive arms to Ukraine. Bennett later faced criticism for putting himself forward as neutral mediator amid global condemnation of Putin, while refusing requests from Ukraine for military equipment.

== Alternate prime minister and post-political career ==
Upon the end of his term, Bennett became the alternate prime minister of Israel on 30 June. On 29 June 2022, Bennett announced that he would not run in the next election, and retire from politics at the end of his term as alternate prime minister. Following the election, Bennett resigned from his position on 6 November, with his term ending two days later. Following his retirement, Bennett joined the board of directors of Israeli tech company Quantum Source in May 2023.

== Bennett 2026 ==
In September 2024, a report from Hevrat HaHadashot indicated that Bennett would return to politics. A report by the Israeli Public Broadcasting Corporation from later that month confirmed that he plans to return to politics. Bennett registered a new political party in April 2025 under the name Bennett 2026, but has not determined whether he will run in the next Knesset election.

According to party registration paperwork filed by Bennett 2026 with the Israeli Corporations Authority, the party plans to "restore security to Israel, and restore the people’s trust in Israel’s ability to defend its borders and the interior of the country while implementing an active security concept." The founders of the party include Bennett, "his wife, Gilat", former member of the Communications Ministry Liran Avissar Ben-Horin, former Strauss Group executive Gadi Lesin and Bruria Naim Erman, who is the founder of a PR firm. The founding members also include Giora Levi, who was Bennett’s commander while he served in the Sayeret Matkal unit, as well as Ofer Ogash, who previously ran for the Knesset as part of Bennett’s previous party and former Target Market executive Nir Novak.

According to a report by Channel 12, Bennett is expected to retain close control of the party; he will manage the Knesset faction and will remain party leader until 2034. In addition, he will be the only person in the party to select candidates for the party's electoral list, will have the sole ability to choose government ministers, and will control the selection of Knesset committee members. This is in contrast to the thirty-sixth government of Israel, where numerous members of his party defected from his government and ultimately brought about its collapse.

Bennett stated at a Kfar Saba conference on 4 September that he would head a centrist slate of candidates in the next election, potentially including Gadi Eisenkot (Yashar) and Avigdor Lieberman (Yisrael Beiteinu), and plans to create a Zionist unity government, which would pursue the creation of an Israeli constitution, and would impose term limits for prime ministers. On 11 November 2025, during a talk at Yeshiva University, Bennett announced that he intends to run for prime minister for the upcoming election.

He disclosed his plans further in a February 2026 event for olim in Tel Aviv (which was conducted in English), stating that if he were elected, his government would, on the first day, initiate a state commission of inquiry over the 7 October attacks and would also work on canceling a draft law for Haredim that is currently being pursued by the Netanyahu government.

=== Together ===
On 26 April 2026, Bennett and Yair Lapid announced in a joint press conference that their parties would run jointly as part of a new political alliance, Together, which will be led by Bennett.

== Political positions ==
Bennett's positions have been described as "ultra-nationalist", and Bennett describes himself, and has been described, as "more right wing" than Netanyahu. He had also been labeled as a far-right politician, a "pragmatist" and an "opportunist". He opposes the existence of a Palestinian state, and supports cutting taxes. Since his term as a member of the Thirty-sixth government of Israel in 2021, he has become increasingly more critical of Likud and Benjamin Netanyahu because of democratic backsliding in Israel and incompetency in handling Israel's Gaza War. However, some within the Israeli opposition have criticized Bennett for not fully abandoning all of his right-wing positions, including his support for annexing Area C of the West Bank and leaving Areas A and B under an "ill-defined autonomy regime".

=== Israeli–Palestinian conflict ===
In February 2012, Bennett published a plan to manage the Israeli–Palestinian conflict called "The Israel Stability Initiative." The plan was based in part on elements of earlier initiatives, such as "Peace on Earth" by Adi Mintz and the "Elon Peace Plan" by Binyamin Elon. It relied on statements of Netanyahu and Likud party ministers in favor of unilateral annexation of the West Bank. Bennett opposed the creation of a Palestinian state, saying: "I will do everything in my power to make sure they never get a state."

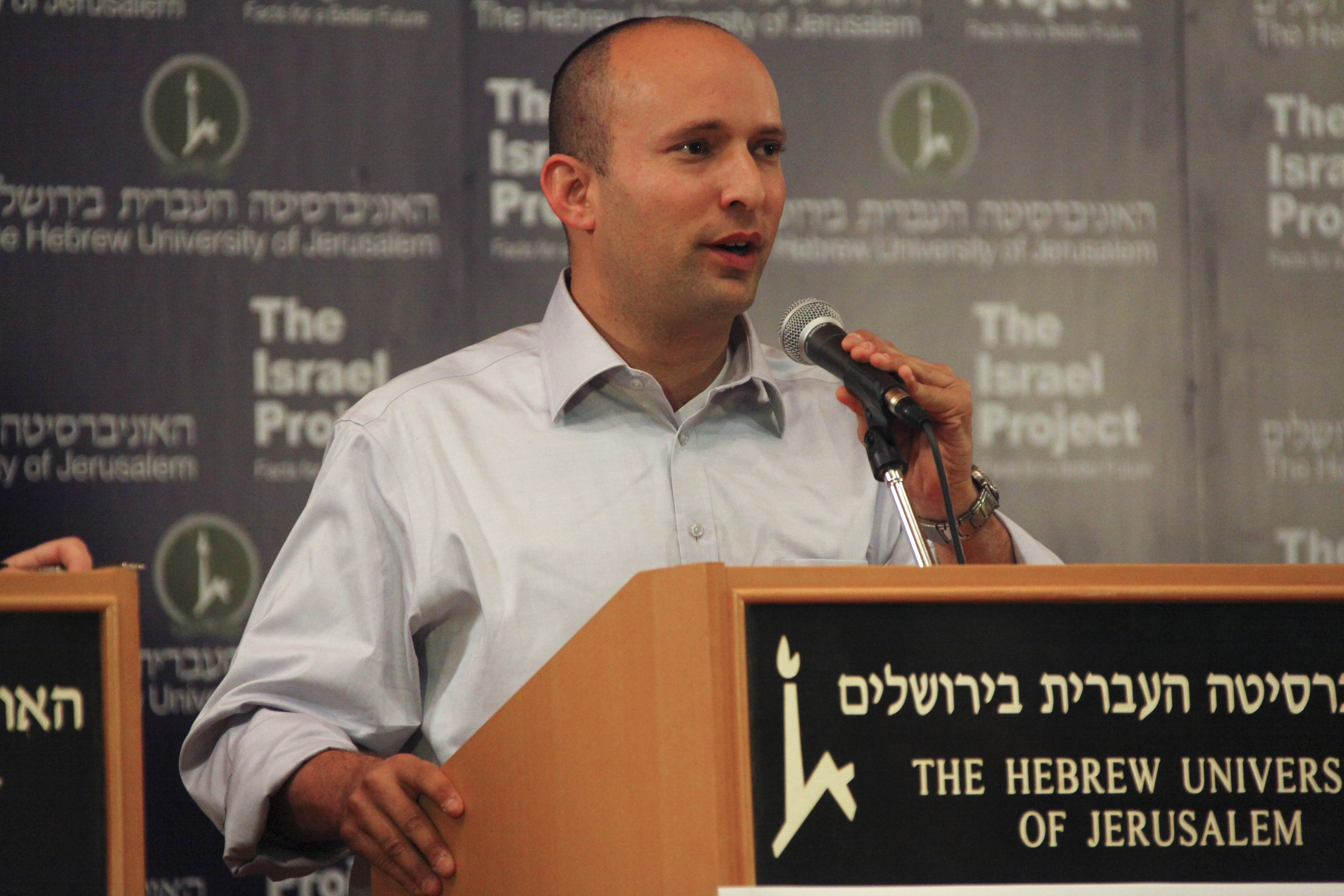
Bennett at the pre-election foreign-policy debate at the Hebrew University of Jerusalem, 8 January 2013

In January 2013, Bennett suggested a tripartition of the Palestinian territories, whereby Israel would unilaterally annex Area C, authority over the Gaza Strip would be transferred to Egypt, and Area A and Area B would remain with the Palestinian National Authority, but under the security umbrella of the Israel Defense Forces and Shin Bet to "ensure quiet, suppress Palestinian terrorism, and prevent Hamas from taking over the territory." Area C constituted 62% of the area, and approximately 365,000 people lived in Israeli settlements. Palestinians who lived in this area would be offered Israeli citizenship or permanent residency status (between 48,000, according to Bennett, and 150,000, according to other surveys).

Finally, Israel would invest in creating roads so Palestinians could travel between Areas A and B without checkpoints, and invest in infrastructure and joint industrial zones, because "[p]eace grows from below – through people, and people in daily life." Bennett also resisted immigration of Palestinian refugees now living outside the West Bank, or the connection between the Hamas-controlled Gaza Strip and the West Bank. In 2011, he stated that there were about 50 factories in the West Bank industrial region where Israelis and Palestinians work together and cited this as one workable approach to finding peace between the two sides.

In June 2013, Bennett suggested that Israel must learn to live with the Palestinian problem without a "surgical action" of separation to two states: "I have a friend who's got shrapnel in his rear end, and he's been told that it can be removed surgically, but it would leave him disabled ... . So he decided to live with it. There are situations where insisting on perfection can lead to more trouble than it's worth." Bennett's "Shrapnel in the butt" quickly became widely known as representing his view of the Palestinian problem.

In response to Israel's release of Palestinian prisoners in 2013, Bennett said that Palestinian terrorists should be shot, allegedly adding: "I already killed lots of Arabs in my life, and there is absolutely no problem with that." Bennett was widely condemned for these words, although he denied saying them, claiming he said merely that "terrorists should be killed if they pose an immediate life threat to our soldiers when in action." In January 2013, Bennett said: "There is not going to be a Palestinian state within the tiny land of Israel [referring to the area from the Jordan River to the Mediterranean Sea]. It's just not going to happen. A Palestinian state would be a disaster for the next 200 years."

In December 2014, a group of academics who opposed the Boycott, Divestment and Sanctions movement and members of The Third Narrative, a Labor Zionist organization, called on the U.S. and E.U. to impose sanctions on Bennett and three other Israelis "who lead efforts to insure permanent Israeli occupation of the West Bank and to annex all or parts of it unilaterally in violation of international law." The academics, who called themselves Scholars for Israel and Palestine (SIP) and claimed to be "pro-Israel, pro-Palestine, pro-peace", asked the U.S. and EU to freeze Bennett's foreign assets and impose visa restrictions. Bennett was chosen as a target for proposed sanctions because of his work in opposing the 2010 settlement freeze while he was director of the Yesha Council, actively supporting annexation of over 60% of the West Bank, and "pressing strongly for a policy of creeping annexation."

In October 2016, Bennett said, "On the matter of the Land of Israel, we have to move from holding action to a decision. We have to mark the dream, and the dream is that Judea and Samaria will be part of the sovereign State of Israel. We have to act today, and we must give our lives. We can't keep marking the Land of Israel as a tactical target and a Palestinian state as the strategic target." In November 2016, Bennett said that the election of Donald Trump as President of the United States gave him hope that the two-state solution would no longer be considered viable, claiming: "The era of the Palestinian state is over."

According to Israeli journalist Anshel Pfeffer, those who have worked with Bennett have privately said that much of his rhetoric is for electioneering purposes, and he is in fact more moderate than believed. Despite his expressed right-wing views against a Palestinian state, while engaged in coalition negotiations for a unity government with Yair Lapid and other party leaders following the 2021 Knesset election, during which he was offered the prime ministership, Bennett agreed to a policy of not annexing any territory in the West Bank and to not build any new settlements while being prime minister in a potential unity government.

In October 2023, during the Gaza war, he expressed support for Israel's total blockade of the Gaza Strip, saying "I'm not going to feed electricity to my enemies." In the interview with U.K.-based Sky News, Bennett was asked: "What about those Palestinians who are in hospital on life support and babies in incubators that will have to be turned off because Israelis have cut the power to Gaza?" Bennett replied: "Are you seriously keep on asking me about Palestinian civilians? What's wrong with you? Have you not seen what's happened? We're fighting Nazis.... When the U.K., Great Britain, was fighting the Nazis during World War II, no one asked what's going on in Dresden."

Following the beginning of the Israeli invasion of the Gaza Strip, Bennett advised against a direct ground invasion and occupation of major cities, but rather for Israel to create buffer zones and conduct sporadic ground raids against isolated pockets of Hamas militants. He believes that this is the best plan that would drain Hamas's resources while it protects Gazan civilians and prevents the collapse of the Israeli economy.

In July 2026, Bennett stated that under his leadership, a future Israeli government would formally declare Qatar an enemy state, characterizing the country as a major financier of Hamas and alleging it was responsible for the casualties and abductions during the 7 October attacks. (Note: In the late 2010s and early 2020s, Israeli officials pushed Qatar to back Hamas, particularly by allowing large quantities of financial aid transferred by Qatar to the organization.) He further alleged that Qatar funds Iran's Islamic Revolutionary Guard Corps based on intelligence he received during his premiership, and described the Al Jazeera Media Network as a global influence campaign aimed at undermining Israel. In response, Qatar accused Bennett of spreading falsehoods for political gain, adding that this is not the first time Bennett has attacked Qatar to score political points at home, that the country's activities in Gaza were carried out in full coordination with Israel and had helped secure the release of Israeli hostages, and that the Israeli politicians who criticize Qatar should instead focus on addressing their own domestic challenges.

=== Economy and society ===
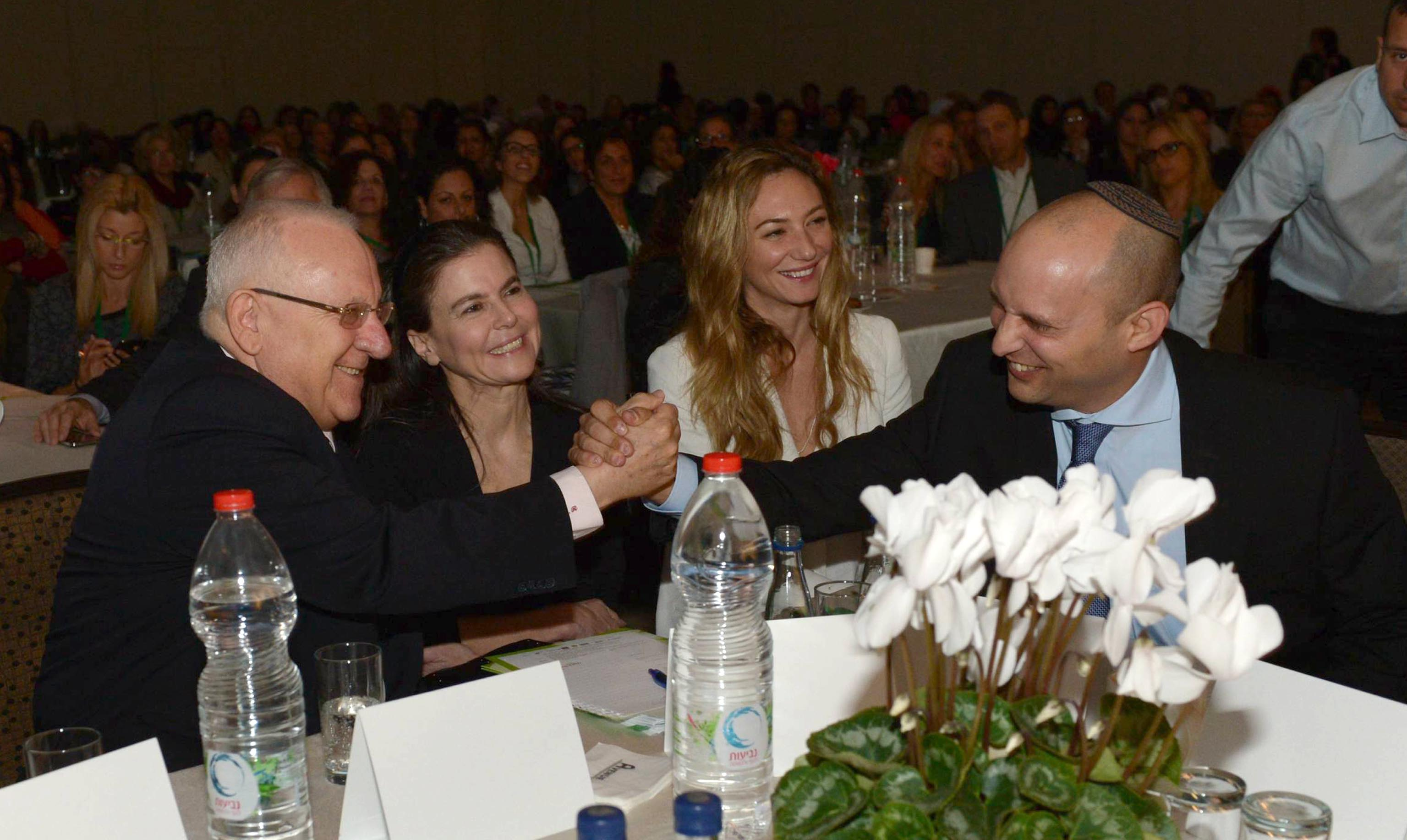
Bennett with President Rivlin, Michal Ansky, and Ofra Strauss at the Jasmine businesswomen's convention for promotion of small and medium-sized enterprises, Israel, 15 December 2014

Bennett believes in less government regulation of the private sector and that private businesses are the engine of economic growth. He favors social support of vulnerable populations such as the elderly and disabled. Bennett has said Israel needs to break the monopoly of the tycoons, the major labor unions, and the Ministry of Defense, which in his opinion are strangling Israel's economy. He believes the key to reducing disparities is equality of opportunity and investment in education in the periphery, to give tools to populations of weaker economic backgrounds. By doing so, Bennett believes weaker populations in Israel will be given the opportunity to succeed professionally and financially. He supports the provision of land to veterans in the periphery, in the Negev, and the Galilee, to promote a national solution to the problem of "affordable housing" and a more equitable distribution of the population in Israel. He has also pledged to remove heavy bureaucratic challenges to small and medium-sized Israeli businesses.

As Economy Minister, Bennett oversaw a new strategy by Israel to increase trade with emerging markets around the world and reduce trade with the European Union, so as to diversify its foreign trade. The two main reasons for this shift are to take advantage of opportunities in emerging markets and to avert the threat of possible EU sanctions on Israel over the Israeli-Palestinian conflict. Bennett acknowledged that he was seeking to reduce Israel's economic dependence on the EU to reduce its influence on Israel. According to the Financial Times, Bennett is the primary architect of this economic pivot. Under his leadership, the Economy Ministry began opening new trade attaché offices in Asia, Africa, and South America, and also began closing some trade offices in Europe and consolidating others with offices in neighboring countries. As part of this process, Bennett opened negotiations with Russia and China on free trade agreements, oversaw continuing negotiations with India for a free trade agreement, and led economic delegations to China and India. While attending the World Trade Organization Ministerial Conference of 2013 in Bali, Indonesia, Bennett held talks with delegations from some unspecified countries on the possibility of future free trade agreements.

Bennett implemented reforms to lower Israel's high food prices. Under his oversight, import duties and barriers were reduced, and mechanisms were set up to ensure more competition in the Israeli food industry. These reforms have been credited with a decline in Israeli food prices that began in April 2014 and continued throughout the rest of the year and into 2015. According to a Haaretz editorial, a fall in global commodity prices and dire financial straits among many Israeli consumers prompted the decline, not the reforms. Bennett has led a push to integrate Haredi men, many of whom are unemployed, into the workforce. According to Bennett, their integration into the workforce will greatly bolster economic growth. Under his "voucher plan", the Ministry of the Economy issues vouchers for hundreds of vocational schools that will allow Haredi men to avoid mandatory military service, at least temporarily, in exchange for enrolling in a vocational school to learn a trade. Bennett also wants to increase employment rate among Israeli-Arab women. In October 2021, Bennett's administration approved plans to spend billions of dollars to improve conditions for Israel's Arab minority.

Bennett expressed support for same-sex civil marriages in Israel and expanding access for LGBTQ couples to rights that heterosexual couples have in 2026. This was a continued evolution from his previous views, as he moved from completely opposing same-sex marriage in 2015 with some benefits like tax breaks, to supporting inclusion initiatives and combatting extremism, to supporting theoretical civil rights but not committing to champion them in 2020.

== Personal life ==
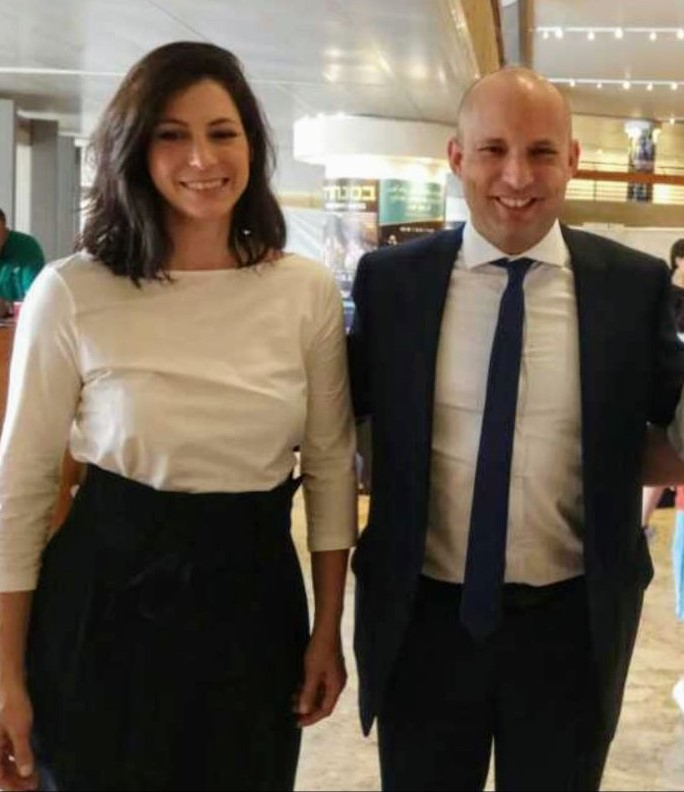
Gilat and Naftali Bennett, Chidon Hatanach, 2017

Bennett married Gilat Ethel Einav in 1999, while he was a law student and reserve Maglan officer. The couple had met during her military service as an educational NCO in the Paratroopers Brigade, when she invited him to lecture her soldiers. She worked as a professional pastry chef before becoming a parent counselor. She was secular, but following her husband she now observes the Sabbath and kashrut. The couple have four children and live in Ra'anana, a city 20 kilometres (12 mi) north of Tel Aviv. They have four children: sons Yonatan and David and daughters Avigail and Michal. Their son Yonatan is named after Yonatan Netanyahu and the middle name of their son David Emmanuel is in honor of Emmanuel Moreno, who was a comrade of Bennett's in the special forces. Bennett adheres to Modern Orthodox Judaism.

== See also ==
- List of Israeli politicians

== Notes ==
Party political offices
| Preceded by Daniel Hershkowitz | Leader of the Jewish Home; 2012–2018 | Succeeded by Rafi Peretz |
| Preceded by Position established | Leader of the New Right; 2018–2022 | Succeeded by Ayelet Shaked |
Political offices
| Preceded by Benjamin Netanyahu | Prime Minister of Israel; 2021–2022 | Succeeded by Yair Lapid |
