= Infrastructure-based development =

Development based on long-term infrastructure investments

Infrastructure-based economic development, also called infrastructure-driven development, combines key policy characteristics inherited from the Rooseveltian progressive tradition and neo-Keynesian economics in the United States, France's Gaullist and neo-Colbertist indicative planning, Scandinavian social democracy as well as Singaporean and Chinese state capitalism: it holds that a substantial proportion of a nation’s resources must be systematically directed towards long term assets such as transportation, energy and social infrastructure (schools, universities, hospitals) in the name of long term economic efficiency (stimulating growth in economically lagging regions and fostering technological innovation) and social equity (providing free education and affordable healthcare).

While the benefits of infrastructure-based development can be debated, the analysis of US economic history shows that at least under some scenarios infrastructure-based investment contributes to economic growth, both nationally and locally, and can be profitable, as measured by higher rates of return. The benefits of infrastructure investment are shown both for old-style economies (ports, highways, railroads) as well as for the new age (high speed rail, airports, telecommunications, internet...).

== Aschauer's model and other academic approaches ==
According to a study by D. A. Aschauer, there is a positive and statistically significant correlation between investment in infrastructure and economic performance. Furthermore, the infrastructure investment not only increases the quality of life, but, based on the time series evidence for the post-World War II period in the United States, infrastructure also has positive impact on both labor and multifactor productivity. The multifactor productivity can be defined as the variable in the output function not directly caused by the inputs, private and public capital. Thus, the impact of infrastructure investment on multifactor productivity is important because the higher multifactor productivity implies higher economic output and hence higher growth.

In addition to Aschauer’s work, Munnell’s paper supports the point that infrastructure investment improves productivity. Munell demonstrates that the decrease in multifactor productivity growth during the 1970s and 1980s relative to the 1950s and 1960s is due to the decrease of public capital stock rather than the decline in technological progress. By showing that public capital plays an important role in private sector production, Munnell helps Aschauer establish that infrastructure investment was a key factor to “the robust performance of the economy in the ‘golden age’ of the 1950s and 1960s.”

To prove his point, Aschauer builds a model, using the data for the time period from 1953 to 1988, to simulate the effect of higher public investment on the aggregate economy. His simulation shows that, on net, the increased investment in core infrastructure might have greatly improved the performance of the economy.

Aschauer uses the production function $Y= F(K,G,N,Z)=ZK^{\alpha}G^{\beta}N^{1-\alpha-\beta}$, where:

- Y = level of output
- K = private fixed capital
- G = level of government productive services
- N = population or labor force
- Z = index of technological progress
- α and β are constants determined by available technology.

He estimates the production function relation using the average data from 1965 to 1983 for the 50 states. This enables Aschauer to conclude that the level of per capita output is positively and significantly related to core infrastructure investments, in other words, an increase in the core infrastructure investments leads to an increase in the level of per capita output.

However, infrastructure has positive impact not just on the national level. By implementing the cross-sectional study of communities in one state, Janet Rives and Michael Heaney confirm “the links identified in national level studies between infrastructure and economic development” are also present locally. Because infrastructure enters the production function and increases the value of urban land by attracting more firms and house construction, the core infrastructure also has a positive effect on economic development locally.

According to an overview of multiple studies by Louis Cain, the infrastructure investments have also been profitable. For example, Fogel estimated the private rate of return on the Union Pacific Railroad at 11.6%, whereas the social rate that accounts for social benefits, such as improved firm efficiencies and government subsidies, was estimated at 29.9%. In another study, Heckelman and Wallis estimated that the first 500 miles of railroad in a given state led to major increases in property values between 1850 and 1910. They calculated the revenue gain from the land appreciation to be $33,000-$200,000 per mile, while construction costs were $20,000-$40,000 per mile. Hence, on average the revenue from construction of a new railroad outweighed the costs. While initial construction returns were high, the profitability diminished after the first 500 miles.

Even though the revenue streams on infrastructure construction investment fall due to diminishing returns, Edward Gramlich indicates that the rate of return on new construction projects was estimated at 15%. Furthermore, the rate of return on maintenance of current highways was estimated at 35%. It means that even without further new construction, the investment in the maintenance of the core infrastructure is very profitable.

Roller and Waverman, utilizing data for 21 OECD countries, including US, over a 20-year period, from 1970 to 1990, examined the relationship between telecommunications infrastructure investments and economic performance. They used a supply-demand micro-model for telecommunications investments jointly with the macro production equation, accounting for country-specific fixed effects as well as simultaneity. They conclude that there is a causal relationship between telecommunications infrastructure investment and aggregate output.

Shane Greenstein and Pablo T. Spiller examined the effects of telecommunication infrastructure on economic performance in the United States. They conclude that infrastructure investment accounts for a significant fraction of the growth in consumer surplus and business revenue in telecommunications services, both of which indicate the growth in economic performance.

== The 'China way' ==
=== An alternative development path? ===
"Some European and Asian economists suggest that “infrastructure-savvy economies” such as Norway, Singapore and China have partially rejected the underlying Neoclassical “financial orthodoxy” that used to characterize the ‘Washington Consensus’ and initiated instead a pragmatist development path of their own based on sustained, large-scale, government-funded investments in strategic infrastructure projects: “Successful countries such as Singapore, Indonesia and South Korea still remember the harsh adjustment mechanisms imposed abruptly upon them by the IMF and World Bank during the 1997-1998 ‘Asian Crisis’ […] What they have achieved in the past 10 years is all the more remarkable: they have quietly abandoned the “Washington consensus” by investing massively in infrastructure projects […] this pragmatic approach proved to be very successful".

Research conducted by the World Pensions Council (WPC) suggests that while China invested roughly 9% of its GDP in infrastructure in the 1990s and 2000s, most Western and non-Asian emerging economies invested only 2% to 4% of their GDP in infrastructure assets. This considerable investment gap allowed the Chinese economy to grow at near optimal conditions while many South American, South Asian and African economies suffered from various development bottlenecks: poor transportation networks, aging power grids, inadequate school facilities, among other issues.

=== Asian Infrastructure Investment Bank and 'One Belt, One Road' ===
"The Beijing-based Asian Infrastructure Investment Bank (AIIB) established in July 2015 and corollary One Belt, One Road Chinese-led initiative demonstrate the PRC government’s capacity to garner the financial and political resources needed to "export" their economic development model, notably by persuading neighboring Asian nations to join AIIB as founding members: “as Asia (excluding China) will need up to $900bn in infrastructure investments annually in the next 10 years (which means there’s a 50% shortfall in infra spending in the continent), many [Asian] heads of state […] gladly expressed their interest to join this new international financial institution focusing solely on ‘real assets’ and infrastructure-driven economic growth".

== Recent developments in North America and the EU ==
In the West, the notion of pension fund investment in infrastructure has emerged primarily in Australia and Canada in the 1990s notably in Ontario and Quebec and has attracted the interest of policy makers in sophisticated jurisdictions such as California, New York, the Netherlands, Denmark and the UK.

In the wake of the Great Recession that started after 2007, liberal and Neo-Keynesian economists in the United States have developed renewed arguments in favor of “Rooseveltian” economic policies removed from the ‘Neoclassical’ orthodoxy of the past 30 years- notably a degree of federal stimulus spending across public infrastructures and social services that would “benefit the nation as a whole and put America back on the path to long term growth”.

Similar ideas have gained traction amongst IMF, World Bank and European Commission policy makers in recent years notably in the last months of 2014/early 2015: Annual Meetings of the International Monetary Fund and the World Bank Group (October 2014) and adoption of the €315 bn European Commission Investment Plan for Europe (December 2014).

== Kazakhstan's infrastructure development program ==
The Nurly Zhol plan or 'New Economic Policy', announced on 11 November 2014 during Kazakhstan President’s State of the Nation Address, introduced a number of measures aimed at developing country's infrastructure in order to sustain economic growth. The Nurly Zhol program applies to such sectors of infrastructure as transport and logistic, tourism, housing and communal services, education, support of export, agriculture, etc.

== Trump’s 'America First' Infrastructure Plan ==
In May 2015, one month before launching his presidential campaign, Donald Trump expressed his desire to "fix" America's aging infrastructure. He views the modernization of American infrastructure as an extension of his career as a real estate developer and a concrete item to add to his legacy as President. He also considers infrastructure investments a tool to create jobs and to spur economic growth.

A key aspect of this policy is that it relegates primary funding responsibility to local authorities and the private sector. Trump's aim with this funding policy is to realize his promise during the 2016 presidential campaign to bring jobs to rural areas, where employment prospects have been dim, and to transfer wealth from states that tend to vote Democrat to those that helped him win the election. On June 20, 2017, at the SelectUSA Investment Summit in Washington, Treasury Secretary Steven Mnuchin said that financial help from foreign investors will probably be necessary in order for President Trump's $1 trillion infrastructure plan to "upgrade U.S. roads, bridges, airports and other public works", to succeed.

Trump's successful presidential bid was to a large extent based on an ‘unorthodox’ economic plank bringing together supply-side policies and infrastructure-based development planning: “the deliberate neglect of America’s creaking infrastructure assets (notably public transportation and water sanitation) from the early 1980s on eventually fueled a widespread popular discontent that came back to haunt both Hillary Clinton and the Republican establishment. Donald Trump was quick to seize on the issue to make a broader slap against the laissez-faire complacency of the federal government: ‘when I see the crumbling roads and bridges, or the dilapidated airports or the factories moving overseas to Mexico, or to other countries for that matter, I know these problems can all be fixed’ (June 22, 2016 New York Speech: ‘We Will Build the Greatest Infrastructure on the Planet Earth’).”

This unconventional (by American standards) policy mix favoring renewed federal government involvement in infrastructure investment and co-investment across the board (at national, state, municipal and local level) is known as Trumponomics.

On January 31, 2019, President Trump issued an executive order encouraging the purchase of U.S.-made construction materials for public infrastructure projects, especially those that need funding from the federal government. This followed his 2017 "Buy American, Hire American" executive order restricting the hiring of foreign workers and tightening standards for federal acquisitions. As of February 2019, Canadian officials were negotiating an exemption for their country.

President Donald Trump's position with regards to energy independence is similar to that of his predecessors dating back to the 1970s. President Barack Obama, his immediate predecessor, lifted a 40-year old ban on oil exports and granted over two dozen liquefied-natural-gas-export licenses. Trump's goal is to achieve "energy dominance," or the maximization of the production of fossil fuels for domestic use and for exports.

=== Reliance on “infrastructure as an asset class” for private investors ===
Donald Trump's policies aim at harnessing private capital to leverage government spending on infrastructure at federal, state and local level. This approach relies on the notion of “infrastructure as an asset class” for institutional investors, which was initially developed in Northern Europe, Canada and Australia

=== Blackstone-Saudi Arabia infrastructure fund ===
On May 20, 2017, during President Donald Trump's official state visit to Saudi Arabia, he signed a $110 billion arms deal with Saudi Arabia; Saudi Arabia and the United Arab Emirates announced they would "donate a combined $100 million to a World Bank fund for women entrepreneurs", a project inspired by Ivanka Trump; and Saudi Arabia "joined forces" with The Blackstone Group, a global private equity firm to "build a $40 billion war chest to privatize U.S. infrastructure". Blackstone's CEO is Stephen Schwarzman, leads Trump's business council, "advising him on "policy issues ranging from trade to infrastructure", unveiled a $40 billion fund which will primarily invest in infrastructure in the United States. Blackstone, which has "$360 billion in assets" is entering into infrastructure projects in which "large investors" plant "their money into the cogs of the global economy such as toll roads, airports, public works, buildings, ports, wireless infrastructure, pipelines, and railroads". Saudi Arabia will provide $20 billion from its Private Investment Fund (PIF) towards the Blackstone infrastructure fund. Limited partners will contribute $20 billion. "With debt financing, Blackstone hopes eventually to bring the total to $100 billion" in "total infrastructure investments on a leveraged basis".

== Biden's Infrastructure Bill ==
=== Unprecedented public funding ===
The Infrastructure Investment and Jobs Act, also known as the Bipartisan Infrastructure Bill, is a United States federal statute enacted by the 117th United States Congress and signed into law by President Joe Biden on November 15, 2021. It includes approximately $1.2 trillion in new spending, unlocking unprecedented funding for transportation, broadband, and utilities across the United States.

=== Geoeconomic considerations ===
Chinese state media, which had largely ignored the preceding policy debates on Capitol Hill, mocked the newly passed infrastructure bill as a "feeble imitation" of their nation's accomplishments: "the Global Times, a newspaper produced by the ruling Chinese Communist Party, criticized the Infrastructure Investment and Jobs Act in an [acerbic] editorial."

Commenting on the passage of the bill, the Hon. Nick Sherry and other experts from the Singapore Economic Forum have argued that the Infrastructure Bill is a reflection of the bipartisan if belated realisation in America that China is outpacing the United States on infrastructure after four decades of neoliberal neglect:

"In Washington and Wall Street, there was until recently, a pronounced scepticism as to whether sustained government investment in transportation infrastructure is at all desirable. The rapid geoeconomic rise of China, as exemplified by the successful establishment of the Asian Infrastructure Investment Bank (AIIB) was actually the only factor strong enough to force a reassessment by U.S. policy thinkers, be they Trump Republicans or Clinton Democrats, the latter constituting the true center of gravity of the Biden White House: 'The Chinese are investing a lot of money, they’re investing billions of dollars and dealing with a whole range of issues that relate to transportation, the environment and a whole range of other things, [...] China is going to ‘eat our lunch’ if the U.S. doesn’t get moving on infrastructure'!"

== See also ==
- Circular economy
- New Deal
- Green New Deal
- Reform and opening up
- Belt and Road Initiative
- Infrastructure and economics
- Public infrastructure
- Hierarchy theory
- Scale (analytical tool)
