= Singapore Forum =

Event with a focus on Asia Pacific diplomacy and economic policy

The Singapore Forum, also known as Singapore Economic Forum (SEF), was re-established as an Asia Pacific plus G12 nations biannual event held in Singapore – typically in the third week of March (date may vary in accordance with Chinese new year and Ramadan holidays).

The forum brings together policymakers, academics, and S&P Global 100 executives for up to three days to discuss financial, geo-economic, and social issues that define the "Asian Century": notably the growing convergence of economic and social growth dynamics in light of the Sustainable Development Goals and the way long-term asset owners such as pension funds and sovereign wealth institutions invest in the region — including listed equity, private equity, venture capital, and infrastructure assets.

The event is organized by the APAC Leadership Council, an Anglo-Singaporean think tank, in association with global, regional and national industry groups, asset owner associations, policy research centres, and family offices.

== The 'Asset Owner of the Future' report and survey ==
The main findings of a multidisciplinary research project titled “The Asset Owner of the Future: Risks, Returns, and Realism in the Age of Geoeconomics” conducted annually by the organizers are presented at the forum's opening session. Preliminary findings may be presented in other conferences and journals in the weeks leading up to the forum.
