= Grousbeck =

Grousbeck is a surname. Notable people with the surname include:

- Anne Grousbeck (born 1966), American tennis player
- H. Irving Grousbeck (born 1934), American businessman and professor
- Wyc Grousbeck (born 1961), American businessman
