= H. Irving Grousbeck =

US entrepreneur and professor (born 1934)

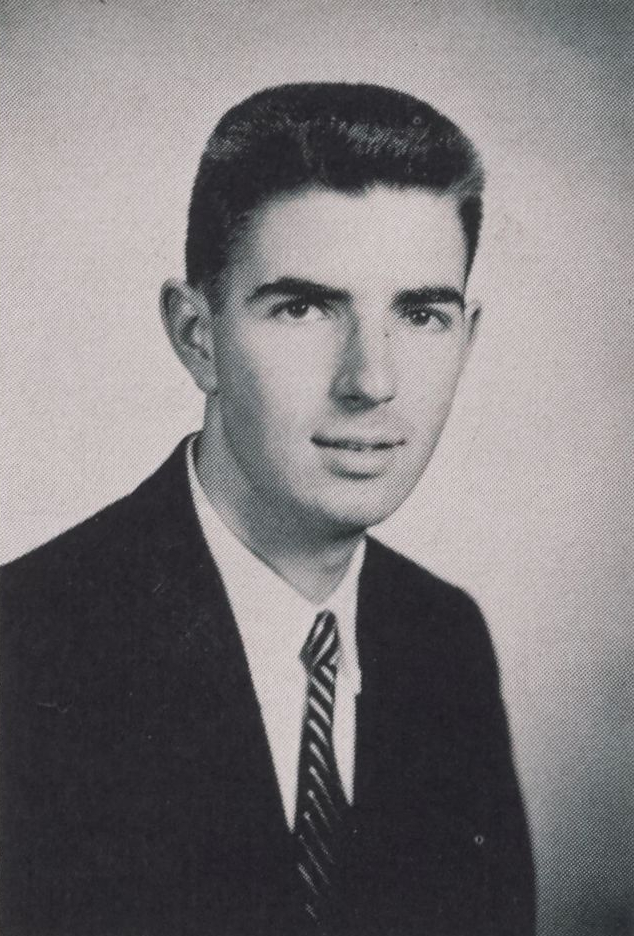
- Grousbeck in the Amherst College yearbook, 1956
- Born: Harold Irving Grousbeck; July 20, 1934 (age 92)
- Education: Amherst College; Harvard Business School
- Children: Wyc (b. 1961)

Harold Irving "Irv" Grousbeck (born July 20, 1934) is an American entrepreneur, professor at Stanford Business School, and co-owner of the National Basketball Association basketball franchise the Boston Celtics.

== Career ==
Grousbeck is one of the directors of Stanford Business School’s Center for Entrepreneurial Studies. He came on the faculty at Stanford in 1985 first as a visiting lecturer and in 1986 as a lecturer. In 1996, he was named a consulting professor. Prior to Stanford, Grousbeck had been a visiting lecturer at Harvard Business School from 1981 through 1985. He teaches a number of topics relating to entrepreneurship and issues faced by entrepreneurial companies and individuals.

Grousbeck co-founded Continental Cablevision (later Media One) in 1964 with his college roommate, Amos Hostetter, Jr. He served as its President from 1964 through 1980 and was chairman from 1980 through 1985.

In 2003, Grousbeck together with his son Wyc Grousbeck, Steve Pagliuca, Robert Epstein, David Epstein, William P. Egan, and John Svenson, acquired the Boston Celtics through their company Boston Basketball Partners LLC for $360 million.

Grousbeck is credited with originating the concept of a search fund to make private equity investments in 1984.

In 1996, Grousbeck co-founded the Stanford Center for Entrepreneurial Studies (CES) alongside Charles Holloway.

Grousbeck serves on the board of a variety of companies and non-profit organizations including Alta Colleges, Asurion and Carillon Assisted Living.

Previously, he has held various positions with William and Flora Hewlett Foundation, Children's Hospital Boston, the Massachusetts Board of Higher Education, Newton-Wellesley Hospital, the New England Eye Bank and Menlo School.

== Education ==
Grousbeck is from Northampton, Massachusetts and attended high school at Deerfield Academy. He received his B.A. in 1956 from Amherst College. He continued his education at Harvard Business School, where he received a M.B.A. He was also awarded a Doctor of Humane Letters from his alma mater Amherst College in 2000 and from Menlo College in 2015.

== Publications ==
- New Business Ventures And The Entrepreneur, with Howard H. Stevenson and Michael Roberts, 1998, ISBN 0256204772
