= Pension fund investment in infrastructure =

Investing directly in infrastructure by pension funds

Private Market Assets Matrix: Infrastructure vs. Overall Non-Listed

Pension fund investment in infrastructure is the investing by pension funds directly in the non traditional asset class of infrastructure assets as part of their investment strategy. Traditionally the preserve of governments and municipal authorities, infrastructure has become an asset class in its own right in the 2010s for private-sector investors, most notably pension funds.

== History ==
Historically, pension funds have tended to invest mostly in "core assets" (such as money market instruments, government bonds, and large-cap equity) and, to a lesser extent, "alternative assets" (such as real estate, private equity and hedge funds). The average allocation to infrastructure historically represented only 1% of total assets under management by pensions, excluding indirect investment through ownership of stocks of listed utility and infrastructure companies.

However, government disengagement from the costly long-term financial commitments required by large infrastructure projects during the Great Recession, combined with the realization that infrastructure could be an ideal asset class providing advantages such as long duration, facilitating cash flow matching with long-term liabilities, protection against inflation, and statistical diversification (i.e., a low correlation with "traditional" listed assets such as equities and fixed income), has prompted an increasing number of pension executives to consider investing in the infrastructure asset class. This macro-financial perspective on pension investment in infrastructure was developed by US, Canadian, and European financial economics and labor law experts, notably from Harvard Law School, the World Pensions Council, and the OECD.

"At the start of the decade, the World Pensions Council (WPC) and the Organisation for Economic Co-operation and Development (OECD) helped convene some of the first international summits focusing on the future of long-term investments in the post-Lehman era, arguing that infrastructure would soon become an asset class in its own right. At that time, we thought that the crisis would usher an era of durably low interest rates, pushing more pension and insurance investors to pursue a ‘quest for yields,’ increasing mechanically their allocation to non-traditional asset classes such as private equity, real estate and [listed and non-listed] infrastructure."

== Canadian, Californian, and Australian early entrants ==
Pension funds, including superannuation schemes, account for approximately 40% of all investors in the infrastructure asset class, excluding projects directly funded and developed by governments, municipalities, and public authorities. Large Canadian pension funds and sovereign investors have been particularly active in energy assets such as natural gas and natural gas infrastructure, where they have become major players in recent years.

Until recently, apart from sophisticated jurisdictions such as Ontario, Quebec, California, and the Netherlands, most North American, European, and UK pensions wishing to gain exposure to infrastructure assets did so indirectly, through investments made in infrastructure funds managed by specialized Canadian, US, or Australian funds.

== UK Pensions Infrastructure Platform ==
On November 29, 2011, the British government unveiled an unprecedented plan to encourage large-scale pension investments in roads, hospitals, airports, and the like across the UK. The plan was aimed at enticing £20 billion ($30.97 billion) of investment in domestic infrastructure projects over a next decade. On October 18, 2012, HM Treasury announced that the National Association of Pension Funds (NAPF) and the Pension Protection Fund (PPF) had succeeded in "securing a critical mass of Founding Investors needed to move to the next stage of development" and that "several major UK pension funds have signed up to the Pension Infrastructure Platform (PIP). The intention is that the Founding Investors will provide around half of the target £2 billion of investment capital for the fund, before it launches early next year".

== Infrastructure nationalism ==
Some experts have warned against the risk of "infrastructure nationalism", insisting that steady investment flows from foreign pension and sovereign funds were key to the long-term success of the infrastructure asset class, notably in large European jurisdictions such as France and the UK.
