= UBreakiFix =

American electronics repair franchise

uBreakiFix
- Type: Subsidiary
- Founded: 2009; 17 years ago
- Founder: David Reiff; Eddie Trujillo; Justin Wetherill
- Headquarters: Orlando, Florida, U.S.
- Area served: North America
- Parent: Asurion

uBreakiFix is an American chain of electronic repair shops, founded in 2009 with over 920 locations in 2016 across the United States and the Caribbean. They are most commonly known for repairing all kinds of electronics. In August 2019, uBreakiFix was acquired by Asurion, LLC, an insurance company. Its Canadian division was sold to Mobile Klinik in January 2023, and all franchises were rebranded.

== History ==
Circa 2009, accountant Justin Wetherill graduated University of Central Florida and began work as an accountant. When he dropped and shattered his phone screen, the incident inspired him to study phone repair with his friend David Reiff. In 2009, Wetherill cofounded uBreakiFix with his friend David Reiff as a mail-in a cell phone repair service, out of his bedroom in Orlando, FLA. However, upon discovering customers desired same-day service, they opened a low-rent brick and mortar location.

uBreakiFix was established in Orlando, Florida as a single shop.

In 2012, they began to franchise operations by offering store managers their own franchise location, "charging them only one month’s worth of sales and financing the transaction at 0%". It then quickly expanded by offering franchise opportunities.

uBreakiFix's business model centers around servicing equipment such as smartphones, game consoles, tablets, and computers. In 2016, Google made them the only authorized walk-in repair provider for the Pixel and Pixel XL, providing the company with OEM (original equipment manufacturer) parts for replacements. Industry reports speculated that this choice was made in order for Google to compete with the Apple Genius Bar, which offers in-person iPhone repairs. Samsung formed a similar partnership with uBreakiFix in 2018, naming them as an authorized in-warranty Samsung repair center and providing stores with access to OEM components.

The uBreakiFix franchise was listed eighteenth on Entrepreneur's 2018 Franchise 500 list. The company was also mentioned in the Orlando Business Journal as one of 2019's “Fast 50,” a list of the top 50 fastest growing private companies in Orlando. Growth for this list is measured by marking percentage growth over a two-year time frame, and companies must show consistent growth over a three-year period.

== Rebranding ==
Asurion announced that uBreakiFix will be rebranding as Asurion Tech Repair & Solutions, but has since retracted the plan. The company reverted to using uBreakiFix by Asurion for all locations by 2024.
