= Timothy F. H. Allen =

British botanist and academic

Timothy F. H. Allen (July 6, 1942 - May 1, 2025) was a British botanist and former professor of Botany and Environmental Studies at the University of Wisconsin–Madison. Allen was a leader in the fields of hierarchy theory, systems theory, and complexity.

== Biography ==
Timothy Allen was born in 1942 in South Croydon, Surrey, U.K, and since the 1970s was a permanent U.S. resident. He received his B.Sc. in 1964 and his Ph.D. in 1968, both at the University College North Wales of the University of Wales, Bangor, in North Wales.

Starting in 1964, Allen worked for four years as a demonstrator at the School of Plant Biology of the University College North Wales. This was followed by two years as a lecturer in the Department of Biological Science at the University of Ife in Nigeria. In 1970 he went to the United States and became an assistant professor at the Department of Botany of University of Wisconsin–Madison, being named professor in 1981. In 1980 he joined the faculty of the Department of Integrated Liberal Studies, and as member of the faculty of the Institute for Environmental Studies, Conservation and Land Management Programs. In 1988–89 he was a visiting professor at the Department of Anthropology and Cybernetic Systems at the San Jose State University.

In 2008–2009, Allen was president of the International Society for the Systems Sciences. He is also a member of the scientific advisory board of the Integral Science Institute.

Timothy Allen's research interests haven been in the fields: theory of complex systems and ecology, in particular hierarchy theory and problems of scale; epistemology for biological systems; resource use and biosocial dynamics; narrative in science.

== Works ==
=== Books ===
- 1982. Hierarchy : perspectives for ecological complexity. With Thomas B. Starr. Chicago : University of Chicago Press.
- 1986. A Hierarchical Concept of Ecosystems. With R.V. O'Neill, D. DeAngelis and J. B. Waide. Princeton : Princeton University Press.
- 1992. Toward a unified ecology. With Thomas W. Hoekstra. New York : Columbia University Press.
- 1996. Hierarchy theory : a vision, vocabulary, and epistemology. With Valerie Ahl, illustrated by Paula Lerner. New York : Columbia University Press.
- 2003. Supply-side sustainability. With Joseph A. Tainter and Thomas W. Hoekstra. New York : Columbia University Press.

=== Selected articles ===
- 1991. "The role of heterogeneity in scaling of ecological systems under analysis". With T.W. Hoekstra. In: J. Kolasa, and S.T.A. Pickett (Eds.). Ecological heterogeneity. Springer-Verlag. pp. 47–68.
- 1993. "The problem of scaling in ecology". With A. King et al. In: Evolutionary Trends in Plants 7:3-8.
- 1991. "Improving predictability in networks: system specification through networks." With R.V. O'Neill. In: M. Higashi and T.P. Burns (eds). Theoretical studies of ecosystems: the network perspective.Cambridge. pp. 101–114.
