= Hierarchy theory =

Means of studying complex ecological systems

Hierarchy theory is a means of studying ecological systems in which the relationship between all of the components is of great complexity. Hierarchy theory focuses on levels of organization and issues of scale, with a specific focus on the role of the observer in the definition of the system. Complexity in this context does not refer to an intrinsic property of the system but to the possibility of representing the systems in a plurality of non-equivalent ways depending on the pre-analytical choices of the observer. Instead of analyzing the whole structure, hierarchy theory refers to the analysis of hierarchical levels, and the interactions between them.

== Uses in ecology ==
Hierarchy theory can be used in ecology to study more complex systems as it allows the system to be divided into structured levels of organization. Instead of treating an ecosystem as a single unit with no division, researchers may be able to examine how the small scaled ecological processes are interconnected with the larger structures of the ecosystem. In riverscape ecology, for example, microhabitats can be nested in pools or riffles, which are nested within reaches, drainage basins, and/or stream segments. Application of this theory can allow ecologists or researchers to look at the changes in ecological processes as the scaling of environmental structures increases.

The hierarchy theory is closely related to the topic of scale. This is especially prevalent when differentiating between grain and extent. For context, grain is the smallest unit of measurement, and extent is the total scale/area in which observations are made. Within ecology, altering spatial extent but having a fixed grain allows ecologists/researchers to conclude whether or not a process is influenced by local habitat conditions or by more broad landscape patterns.

== Riverscape ecology ==
Hierarchy theory can be applied to freshwater biology, or more specifically riverscape ecology, where stream systems are considered to be nested. In a study of Arkansas darter (Etheostoma cragini), hierarchy theory was used to determine how their varying habitat (Arkansas River basin) variables predicted how abundant the fish will be at distinct spatial measures; these were reach, segment, and basin. The data suggested that different habitat variables would be important at different spatial measures. The basin measure was related more with the depth of the channel and the stream width, while at the reach and segment measures, the abundance of the Arkansas darter species was related to channel depth and canopy cover.

The example of the Arkansas darter suggests the use of hierarchy theory in conservation biology. If the habitat relationships are indeed differing by scale, global conservation efforts could be planned at multiple different scales as well. In the case of the Arkansas darter, stream habitats which have an open canopy and are shallow were important for fine scales, and stream width and depth had more importance for more broad basin scales.

== Macroecology ==
Hierarchy theory can be applied to macroecology and can assist in connecting different observed patters at varying spatial and biological levels. One hierarchy model suggested that niche breadth, body size, geographical distribution, and population density are all related varyingly depending on if they are studied at a metacommunity or community level. Niche breadth, in macroecology is the range of environmental conditions and/or resources under which one or many species can survive. At a metacommunity level, species traits like body size and niche breadth can impact both the maximum abundance and distribution. However, at a community level, environmental factors and species richness can impact the existing relationships between population density, distribution, and body size.

This difference among community and metacommunity suggests that scaling relationships within ecology are not fixed through all environments. Rather, relationships like body size and abundance distribution can vary greatly based on species richness, the organisms traits, and environmental factors.

== See also ==
- Timothy F. H. Allen – British botanist and academic
- Big History – Education strategy or academic discipline
- Biological organisation – Hierarchy of complex structures and systems within biological sciences
- Deep ecology – Ecological and environmental philosophy
- Deep history – Academic discipline that studies humanity's origins
- Deep time – Time scales on the billions of years
- Dependency theory – International relations theory
- Infrastructure-based development – Development based on long-term infrastructure investments
- Structuralist economics – Approach to economics
- World-systems theory – Approach emphasizing the world-system as the primary unit of social analysis
