= Biological organisation =

Hierarchy of complex structures and systems within biological sciences

A population of bees shimmers in response to a predator.

Biological organization is the organization of complex biological structures and systems that define life using a reductionistic approach. The traditional hierarchy, as detailed below, extends from atoms to biospheres. The higher levels of this scheme are often referred to as an ecological organizational concept, or as the field, hierarchical ecology.

Each level in the hierarchy represents an increase in organizational complexity, with each "object" being primarily composed of the previous level's basic unit. The basic principle behind the organization is the concept of emergence—the properties and functions found at a hierarchical level are not present and irrelevant at the lower levels.

The biological organization of life is a fundamental premise for numerous areas of scientific research, particularly in the medical sciences. Without this necessary degree of organization, it would be much more difficult—and likely impossible—to apply the study of the effects of various physical and chemical phenomena to diseases and physiology (body function). For example, fields such as cognitive and behavioral neuroscience could not exist if the brain was not composed of specific types of cells, and the basic concepts of pharmacology could not exist if it was not known that a change at the cellular level can affect an entire organism. These applications extend into the ecological levels as well. For example, DDT's direct insecticidal effect occurs at the subcellular level, but affects higher levels up to and including multiple ecosystems. Theoretically, a change in one atom could change the entire biosphere.

== Levels ==
The simplest unit in this hierarchy is the atom, like oxygen. Two or more atoms is a molecule, like a dioxide. Many small molecules may combine in a chemical reaction to make up a macromolecule, such as a phospholipid. Multiple macromolecules form a cell, like a club cell. A group of cells functioning together as a tissue, for example, Epithelial tissue. Different tissues make up an organ, like a lung. Organs work together to form an organ system, such as the Respiratory System. All of the organ systems make a living organism, like a lion. A group of the same organism living together in an area is a population, such as a pride of lions. Two or more populations interacting with each other form a community, for example, lion and zebra populations interacting with each other. Communities interacting not only with each other but also with the physical environment encompass an ecosystem, such as the Savanna ecosystem. All of the ecosystems make up the biosphere, the area of life on Earth.

The simple standard biological organization scheme, from the lowest level to the highest level, is as follows:

For levels smaller than atoms see Subatomic particle
Acellular level and Pre-cellular level	Atoms	
Acellular level and Pre-cellular level	Molecule	Groups of atoms
Acellular level and Pre-cellular level	Biomolecular complex	Groups of (bio)molecules
Sub-cellular level	Organelle	Functional groups of biomolecules, biochemical reactions and interactions
Cellular level	Cell	Basic unit of all life and the grouping of organelles
Super-cellular level (Multicellular level)	Tissue	Functional groups of cells
	Organ	Functional groups of tissues
	Organ system	Functional groups of organs
Ecological levels	Organism	The basic living system, a functional grouping of the lower-level components, including at least one cell
Ecological levels	Population	Groups of organisms of the same species
Ecological levels	Guild	Interspecific groups of organisms carrying the same ecological function (i.e. herbivores).
Ecological levels	Community (or biocoenosis)	Guilds from all biological domains, and their interactions in a specific location.
Ecological levels	Ecosystem	Groups of organisms in conjunction with the physical (abiotic) environment.
Ecological levels	Biome	Continental scale (climatically and geographically contiguous areas with similar climatic conditions) grouping of ecosystems.
Ecological levels	Biosphere or Ecosphere	All life on Earth or all life plus the physical (abiotic) environment
For levels larger than Biosphere or Ecosphere, see Earth's location in the Universe

More complex schemes incorporate many more levels. For example, a molecule can be viewed as a grouping of elements, and an atom can be further divided into subatomic particles (these levels are outside the scope of biological organization). Each level can also be broken down into its own hierarchy, and specific types of these biological objects can have their own hierarchical scheme. For example, genomes can be further subdivided into a hierarchy of genes.

Each level in the hierarchy can be described by its lower levels. For example, the organism may be described at any of its component levels, including the atomic, molecular, cellular, histological (tissue), organ and organ system levels. Furthermore, at every level of the hierarchy, new functions necessary for the control of life appear. These new roles are not functions that the lower level components are capable of and are thus referred to as emergent properties.

Every organism is organized, though not necessarily to the same degree. An organism can not be organized at the histological (tissue) level if it is not composed of tissues in the first place.

== Emergence of biological organization ==
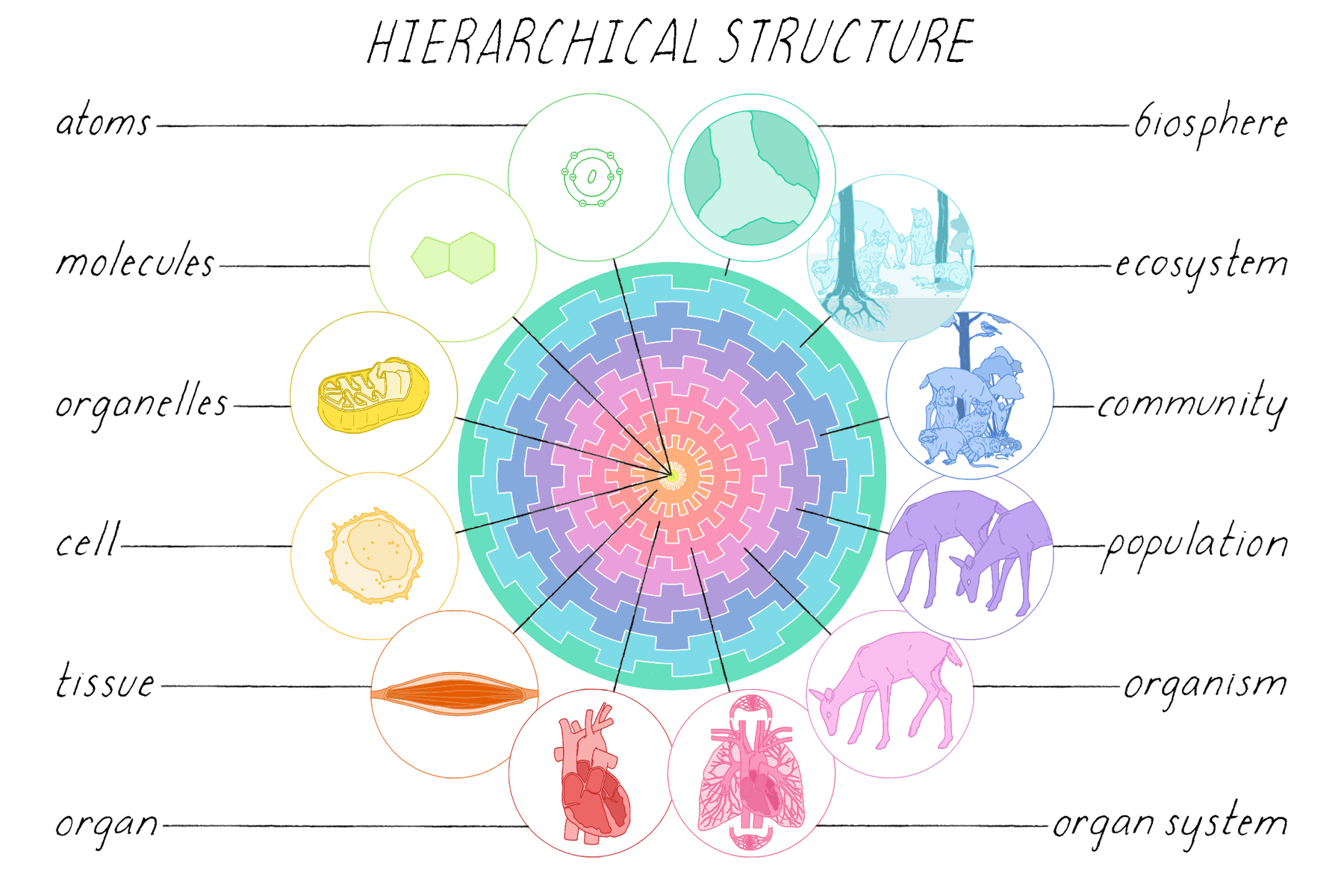
A hierarchical categorization of things (organisms, biological systems, cells, etc.) into large complex groups that are then further divided into progressively smaller and smaller subgroups.

Biological organization is thought to have emerged in the early RNA world when RNA chains began to express the basic conditions necessary for natural selection to operate as conceived by Darwin (heritability, variation of type, and competition for limited resources). Fitness of an RNA replicator (its per capita rate of increase) would likely have been a function of adaptive capacities that were intrinsic (in the sense that they were determined by the nucleotide sequence) and the availability of resources. The three primary adaptive capacities may have been:

(1) the capacity to replicate with moderate fidelity (giving rise to both heritability and variation of type).

(2) the capacity to avoid decay.

(3) the capacity to acquire and process resources.

These capacities would have been determined initially by the folded configurations of the RNA replicators (see "Ribozyme") that, in turn, would be encoded in their individual nucleotide sequences. Competitive success among different RNA replicators would have depended on the relative values of these adaptive capacities. Subsequently, among more recent organisms competitive success at successive levels of biological organization, presumably continued to depend, in a broad sense, on the relative values of these adaptive capacities.

== Fundamentals ==
Empirically, a large proportion of the (complex) biological systems we observe in nature exhibit hierarchical structure. On theoretical grounds we could expect complex systems to be hierarchies in a world in which complexity had to evolve from simplicity. System hierarchies analysis performed in the 1950s, laid the empirical foundations for a field that would be, from the 1980s, hierarchical ecology.

The theoretical foundations are summarized by thermodynamics. When biological systems are modeled as physical systems, in its most general abstraction, they are thermodynamic open systems that exhibit self-organized behavior, and the set/subset relations between dissipative structures can be characterized in a hierarchy.

A simpler and more direct way to explain the fundamentals of the "hierarchical organization of life", was introduced in Ecology by Odum and others as the "Simon's hierarchical principle"; Simon emphasized that hierarchy "emerges almost inevitably through a wide variety of evolutionary processes, for the simple reason that hierarchical structures are stable".

== See also ==
- Abiogenesis
- Cell theory
- Cellular differentiation
- Composition of the human body
- Evolution of biological complexity
- Evolutionary biology
- Gaia hypothesis
- Hierarchy theory
- Holon (philosophy)
- Human ecology
- Level of analysis
- Living systems
- Self-organization
- Spontaneous order
- Structuralism (biology)
- Timeline of the evolutionary history of life

== Notes ==
=== References ===
- Evans, F. C. (1951), "Ecology and urban areal research", Scientific Monthly (73)
- Evans, F. C. (1956), "Ecosystem as basic unit in ecology", Science, 123 (3208): 1127–8, Bibcode:1956Sci...123.1127E, doi:10.1126/science.123.3208.1127, PMID 17793430
- Huggett, R. J. (1999). "Ecosphere, biosphere, or Gaia? What to call the global ecosystem. ECOLOGICAL SOUNDING". Global Ecology and Biogeography. 8 (6): 425–431. doi:10.1046/j.1365-2699.1999.00158.x. ISSN 1466-822X.
- Jordan, F.; Jørgensen, S. E. (2012), Models of the Ecological Hierarchy: From Molecules to the Ecosphere, Newnes, ISBN 9780444593962
- Margalef, R. (1975), "External factors and ecosystem stability", Schweizerische Zeitschrift für Hydrologie, 37 (1): 102–117, Bibcode:1975AqSci..37..102M, doi:10.1007/BF02505181, hdl:10261/337692, S2CID 20521602
- O'Neill, R. V. (1986), A Hierarchical Concept of Ecosystems, ISBN 0691084378
- Pavé, Alain (2006), "Biological and Ecological Systems Hierarchical organization", in Pumain, D. (ed.), Hierarchy in Natural and Social Sciences, New York, New York: Springer-Verlag, ISBN 978-1-4020-4126-6
- Postlethwait, John H.; Hopson, Janet L. (2006), Modern Biology, Holt, Rinehart and Winston, ISBN 0-03-065178-6
- Pumain, D. (2006), Hierarchy in Natural and Social Sciences, Springer, ISBN 978-1-4020-4127-3
- Simon, H. A. (1969), "The architecture of complexity", The Sciences of the Artificial, Cambridge, Massachusetts: MIT Press
- Solomon, Eldra P.; Berg, Linda R.; Martin, Diana W. (2002), Biology (6th ed.), Brooks/Cole, ISBN 0-534-39175-3, LCCN 2001095366
- Wicken, J. S.; Ulanowicz, R. E. (1988), "On quantifying hierarchical connections in ecology", Journal of Social and Biological Systems, 11 (3): 369–377, doi:10.1016/0140-1750(88)90066-8
