= Asurion =

American insurance company

Asurion, LLC
- Type: Private
- Industry: Information technology
- Founded: 1994; 32 years ago
- Headquarters: Nashville, Tennessee, U.S.
- Area served: Worldwide
- Key people: Kevin Taweel (CEO)
- Services: Insurance; Tech support
- Revenue: ▲$8.5 billion
- Owner: NEW Asurion Corporation
- Number of employees: 19,000 (2014)
- Subsidiaries: Soluto; Simplr uBreakiFix
- Website: www.asurion.com

Asurion, LLC is a privately held company based in Nashville, Tennessee, that provides insurance for smartphones, tablets, consumer electronics, appliances, satellite receivers and jewelry. In 2014, the company operated in 14 countries and had 49 offices with 19,000 employees serving 280 million consumers.

== History ==
In 1995, Stanford graduates Kevin Taweel and Jim Ellis used a search fund to acquire the Houston-based roadside assistance company, Road Rescue. The roadside assistance service was sold through local wireless carriers. Four years later, they purchased Nashville-based Merrimac Group, which was offering specialty insurance to cover cellphones. The company began expanding its operations globally in 2003, with an expansion into Asia followed by expansions into Europe (2008) and Australia (2013). The company expanded into Latin America in 2014 with a partnership with America Movil.

The company’s products, services, and clients have expanded since founding, due in part to acquisitions. On January 1, 2006, Lock/line merged with Asurion making Lock/line's former parent company, DST Systems Inc., 35 percent shareholder of the combine company. With the acquisition of Lumitrend on May 31, 2006, the company expanded its product portfolio to include CellBackup software. Cloud device management firm Soluto was acquired in 2013. Also in 2006, the company acquired Warranty Corporation of America (WaCA) then merged in 2008 with National Electronics Warranty (NEW Customer Service Company).

As the company attempted to expand with new ventures, customer service was always an issue. So in February 2017, Asurion launched its Simplr subsidiary to provide customer-service via on demand staffing and machine learning. Through Soluto, Asurion acquired in 2017 Drippler, another tech support app company, and merged it with Soluto. In August 2019, Asurion acquired uBreakiFix, a national phone and electronics repair chain.

In 2018, Asurion borrowed $3.75 billion via two leveraged loans, the proceeds of which were to be funneled to the PE firms that acquired the company in 2007. The two loans brought the company's total term loans to $11.3 billion.

In 2019, Asurion paid $300,000 to a person who claimed to have stolen 1TB of employee and customer information.

== Recognition ==
The company received a CES Innovation Award in 2015 for its support and protection apps that combine live support and instant notifications.
