= Pension investment in private equity =

Pension investment in private equity refers to an important component of pension fund investing known as the Endowment Model (also referred to as The Yale Model, credited to David Swensen and Dean Takahashi).

A pension fund may invest directly in private companies, or indirectly via private equity funds. This is a departure from the classic "70-30 Model" where a pension fund would invest 30% of its assets in publicly-listed stock. The perceived benefits of investing in private companies include the improved ability to diversify by region, industry, and sector, in addition to being able to invest in a greater selection of companies (including privately held companies, not listed on a stock exchange). A perceived drawback is the lack of liquidity of such private investments.

== History ==
Pension investment in private equity started in the United States and Canada in the late-1970s, an era of high inflation and mediocre performance for most listed equity markets, when large institutional investors began to diversify into “non-traditional” asset classes such as private equity and real estate.

The trend towards increased allocation to private equity including venture capital accelerated after 2009–2010. At the start of the Great Recession in the late 2000s, European and Canadian financial economics experts notably from the World Pensions Council estimated that:

"the crisis would usher an era of durably low interest rates, pushing more pension and insurance investors to pursue a ‘quest for yields,’ increasing mechanically their allocation to non-traditional asset classes such as private equity"

== Perceived benefits ==
The traditional drivers of pension investment in private equity include statistical diversification stemming from partial decorrelation to listed securities (‘listed equity’ i.e. stocks and also bonds), expectation of superior risk-adjusted returns over long periods (typically 8 to 10 years), access to early-stage industries and fiscal incentives for investments in SMEs and/or innovative technologies.

Research conducted by the London Business School Coller Institute of Private Equity (CIPE) suggests that for most pension investors “private equity and publicly-listed stocks are viewed as [...] substitute[s]... [there is] a strong negative relationship between quoted equity and private equity allocations”.

Large pension funds typically have long-dated liabilities (longer than those of other institutional investors such as banks or insurance companies). They have a generally lower likelihood of facing liquidity shocks in the medium term and thus can afford the long holding periods required by private equity investment.
