= Soluto =

Israeli device-protection company, 2008–2013

- Company type: Subsidiary
- Founded: 2008; 18 years ago
- Dissolved: 2013; acquired by Asurion though remained as brand
- Headquarters: Tel Aviv, Israel
- Key people: Tomer Dvir (Cofounder, CEO), Ishay Green (Cofounder), Roee Adler (CPO, CMO), Omri Haim (Chief Technology Officer)
- Industry: Computer software, remote support web application
- Website: www.solutotlv.com

Soluto was a device protection software developer that helped users identify and correct problems in Microsoft Windows.

== History ==
Soluto was founded in 2008 by Tomer Dvir and Ishay Green. and received US$1.6 million in seed funding from Proxima Ventures. This was followed-up with a $6.2M second round of financing led by Bessemer Venture Partners and joined by Giza Venture Capital, in March 2009. After the 2009 financisation, Israeli politician Naftali Bennett was brought in by investors as CEO for 3 months.

=== Acquisition ===
In 2013, Soluto was acquired by Asurion, LLC. Soluto ceased operation of the Soluto PC Management platform on April 1, 2016. At the time of purchase, it had 40 employees.

=== Funding ===
- Soluto is funded by Index Ventures, Bessemer Venture Partners, Giza Venture Capital, Proxima Ventures, Crunch Fund, Innovation Endeavors, Initial Capital, and angel investors including Chris Dixon, Yuval Ne'eman, Saar Gillai, and Nadav Zohar.
- Soluto was purchased by Asurion on November 12, 2013, for a reported $130M.

=== Dissolution ===
In 2022, Asurion decided to dissolve Soluto in order to "focus its current growth on the cellular market". The dissolution process included closing down Soluto's R&D center in Tel Aviv, and laying off all of its 120 employees.
