= Harry Klagsbrun =

Swedish businessman (born 1954)

- Born: Harry Klagsbrun; 1953 or 1954 (age 70–71)
- Education: B.A. Stockholm University; M.B.A. New York University; M.Sc. Stockholm School of Economics
- Occupation: Investor

Harry Klagsbrun (born 1954) is a Swedish billionaire and investor.

== Biography ==
Klagsbrun graduated with a B.A. in journalism from Stockholm University, an M.B.A. from New York University and a Master of Economics from the Stockholm School of Economics. After school in 1982, he moved to New York City to work in corporate finance for Smith Barney. In 1989, he took a position as the Head of Corporate Finance at Svenska Handelsbanken. In 1995, he served as CEO of the Alfred Berg Group. In 2001, he accepted a position as a senior executive and head of the asset management at the SEB Group. In 2006, he joined private equity firm EQT AB as a partner in 2006.

== Personal life ==
Klagsbrun is married and lives in Stockholm, Sweden.

== Net worth ==
Forbes lists his net worth as of April 2022 at $1.1 billion USD.
