= Search fund =

Method of raising funds from investors

A search fund is an investment vehicle that enables an entrepreneur to raise capital from investors in order to search for, acquire, and personally operate an existing, privately held company. The model was developed in 1984 by Professor H. Irving Grousbeck at the Stanford Graduate School of Business.

Typically, the process involves two distinct rounds of financing. In the first stage, a small group of investors finances the "search," covering the entrepreneur's (or "searcher's") expenses and a modest salary for a period of up to two years. In the second stage, the searcher, upon the successful identification of their target company, returns to the initial investors and often other new investors to raise the significantly larger amount of acquisition capital required to complete the purchase. Following the acquisition, the searcher takes on the role of chief executive officer (CEO) of the acquired business, with the goal of growing the company and providing a return to investors and themselves. Grousbeck has said this model "[It's] the most direct way I know for aspiring MBA entrepreneurs to get into business for themselves. And now that there are many experienced search-funders out there, those who have gone earlier are advising those who have come along more recently."

While the traditional investor-backed model is most common, variations exist, including accelerator-led and self-funded searches.

== Origin ==
The concept of search funds started in 1984 at Stanford University Graduate School of Business. It was pioneered by Professor Irving Grousbeck, the Director of the Center for Entrepreneurial Studies. Since then, over 681 traditional funds have been formed, with Stanford University documenting more than 177 search funds from alumni of its elite MBA program. The majority of the successful search funds were started by entrepreneurial, book-smart graduates who lacked experience in managing a business. In a 2024 study published by Stanford which looked at the rates of return of the 681 funds since 1984, the internal rate of return was 35.1% along with a 4.5 time return on investment. Joe Staenberg, founder and CEO of Agate Hound Fund has cited search funds as better investment vehicles as opposed to the stock market which averages around 9% annually for return on investment.

== Process ==
In the first stage, a small group of investors back operating managers to search for a target company to acquire which can often take 2 to 6 months. Investors are able to invest a pro-rata share in the target company, subject to their individual liking. A fund may or may not find a target acquisition company through this second stage process which typically spans 1 to 2 years. In the third stage, assuming the searcher was able to find a company to acquire, they take on operating roles in the acquired company, such as CEO and President. They continue in these roles for around 4 to 7 years and attempt to create value. Finally, the last stage of the model, the exit takes around 6 months while searchers look to sell the company they once bought.

Traditional search funds typically target companies in the $5 million to $50 million price range, requiring $2 million to $10 million of equity capital, in fragmented industries with sustainable market positions, histories of stable cash flows, and long-term opportunities for improvement and growth. Self-funded search funds generally target businesses less than $5 million. Service and light manufacturing companies outside high-tech industries are popular targets. Often these companies are under-managed prior to the acquisition.

Most search funds are started by entrepreneurs with limited operational experience and possibly no direct experience in the target industry. The goal of the investor is to place promising, motivated managers in an environment with a high probability for success given the oversight and experience of the investors themselves. This model offers less risk than starting a company from scratch since the business already has customers, revenue, and a stake in the market.

== Growth in Recent Years ==
The search fund model has seen such an increase in recent years due to the number of family owned businesses without a clear successor in line. According to a poll done by Gallup, over half of US small businesses are owned by people 55 years old and over who lack a clear succession plan. With these numbers, many MBA students who see themselves as the next generation of entrepreneurs have been buying these companies through the search fund model. In 2023, a new record was set with almost 100 funds launched across the US and Canada. The model seems to be catching on internationally also with another new record of 59 search funds launched abroad. Search capital raised has seen an increase in recent years also, from $5 million in 2010, to $75 million in 2023. In this same time period, total acquisition volume has also noted a healthy increase from $110 million to $880 million.
