= World Pensions & Investments Forum =

Global summit on pensions and investment

- Location: Global
- Website: www.worldpensions.org

The World Pensions Forum, also called World Pensions & Investments Forum, is a research and policy oriented conference organised by M. Nicolas Firzli, founder of the World Pensions Council (WPC), in partnership with regional and supranational organisations, large public and private institutional investors from G10 countries, the emerging nations of Eastern Europe, Latin America, Asia and the MENA area.

The first edition of the forum was held in Paris at the OECD: on that occasion, leading experts from the OECD, the University of Cambridge, the IMF, the World Bank and various US, UK and Mainland European institutions presented the latest advances in the fields quantitative asset allocation, financial risk management, socially responsible investing and corporate governance.

The second edition was held in Paris at the headquarters of the Society for the Encouragement of National Industry (SEIN): discussions focused on long term investments, infrastructure assets, in the European Union and key emerging markets notably Russia, Mexico, Chile, Brazil and China and the rise of private equity and "real assets".

The third edition was held in Hong Kong with the support of the Hong Kong Special Administrative Region of the People's Republic of China: the main plenary presentations and roundtables focused on pension governance, the role of trustees – notably in the Australian, Asian and UK contexts, stochastic investment models, different approaches to life expectancy assumptions, the growing role of private equity and infrastructure assets for both pension funds and sovereign wealth funds notably in relation to Infrastructure-based development and, more generally, the analysis of concrete policy measures and regional and local best practices that could contribute to "solving the pensions crisis across the globe".

Both the 4th edition (October 2014) and the 5th Annual World Pensions Forum (December 2015) were held in Saint-Germain-des-Prés, in Paris, the latter in association with the United Nations COP21 Summit: plenary speeches and roundtables focused on ESG and responsible investment, modern indexing and factor-based strategies, pension fund and sovereign wealth fund co-investment, Blended Finance and securities lending.
