= Private equity =

Stock in an unlisted private company

Private equity (PE) is stock in a private company that does not offer stock to the general public. Instead, it is offered to specialized investment funds and limited partnerships that take an active role in managing and structuring the companies. Colloquially, "private equity" can refer to these investment firms rather than the companies in which they invest.

Private-equity capital is invested into a target company either by an investment management company (private equity firm), a venture capital fund, or an angel investor; each category of investor has specific financial goals, management preferences, and investment strategies for profiting from their investments. Private equity can provide working capital to finance a target company's expansion, including the development of new products and services, operational restructuring, management changes, and shifts in ownership and control.

As a financial product, a private-equity fund is private capital for financing a long-term investment strategy in an illiquid business enterprise. Private equity fund investing has been described by the financial press as the superficial rebranding of investment management companies who specialized in the leveraged buyout of financially weak companies.

Evaluations of the returns of private equity are mixed: some find that it outperforms public equity, but others find otherwise.

== Key features ==
An illustration of the "J curve" in Private Equity in which net cash outlays in early years are outstripped by cash inflows in the later years

Some key features of private equity investment include:

- An Investment manager (the private equity investor) raises money from institutional investors (e.g., hedge funds, pension funds, university endowments, and ultra-high-net-worth individuals) to pursue a particular investment strategy.
  - The fund's raised proceeds are placed into an investment fund, of which the investment manager acts as a general partner (GP) and the institutional investors act as limited partners (LPs).
- The investment manager then purchases equity ownership stakes in companies by using a combination of equity and debt financing, with the goal of generating returns on the equity invested, including any subsequent equity investments into the target companies, over a target horizon based on the particular investment fund and strategy (typically 4–7 years).
- From a financial modeling perspective, the primary levers available to private equity investors to drive returns are:
  - Revenue growth
  - Margin expansion (typically an EBITDA margin)
  - Free cash flow generation / debt paydown
  - Valuation multiple expansion (typically an Enterprise Value / EBITDA multiple)
- Value creation strategies can vary widely by private equity fund. For example, some investors may target increasing sales in new or existing markets (driving revenue growth), and others may look to reduce costs through headcount reduction (expanding margins). Many strategies incorporate some amount of corporate governance restructuring, for example, setting up a board of directors or updating the target's managerial reporting structure.
- The use of debt financing in acquiring companies increases an investment's return on equity by reducing the amount of initial equity required to purchase the target. Moreover, the interest payments are tax-deductible, so the debt financing reduces corporate taxes and thus increases total after-tax cash flows generated by the business.
  - Following a series of high-profile bankruptcies, aggressive leverage usage by private equity funds has declined in recent decades. In 2005, approximately 70% of the average private equity acquisition represented debt, but it was closer to 50% in 2020.
  - Firms that assume large operational risks (e.g., "turnarounds") will usually apply far lower leverage levels to acquired companies in order to provide management with more financial flexibility; firms taking fewer operational risks will often try to maximize available leverage and focus on investments that generate strong, stable cash flows needed to service the higher debt balances.
- Over time, "private equity" has come to refer to many different investment strategies, including leveraged buyout, distressed securities, venture capital, growth capital, and mezzanine capital. One of the most noteworthy differences between leveraged buyouts and the other strategies is that buyouts are generally "control equity positions", as buyout funds usually purchase majority ownership stakes in their target companies, while other investment strategies typically purchase minority ("non-control") ownership stakes, reducing their ability to effect transformational changes across target companies.
- For large deals, private-equity investors often invest together in a syndicate, in order to jointly benefit from exposure diversification, complementary investor information and skills, and heightened connectivity for future investments.

== Strategies ==
The strategies private-equity firms may use are as follows, leveraged buyout being the most common.

=== Leveraged buyout ===
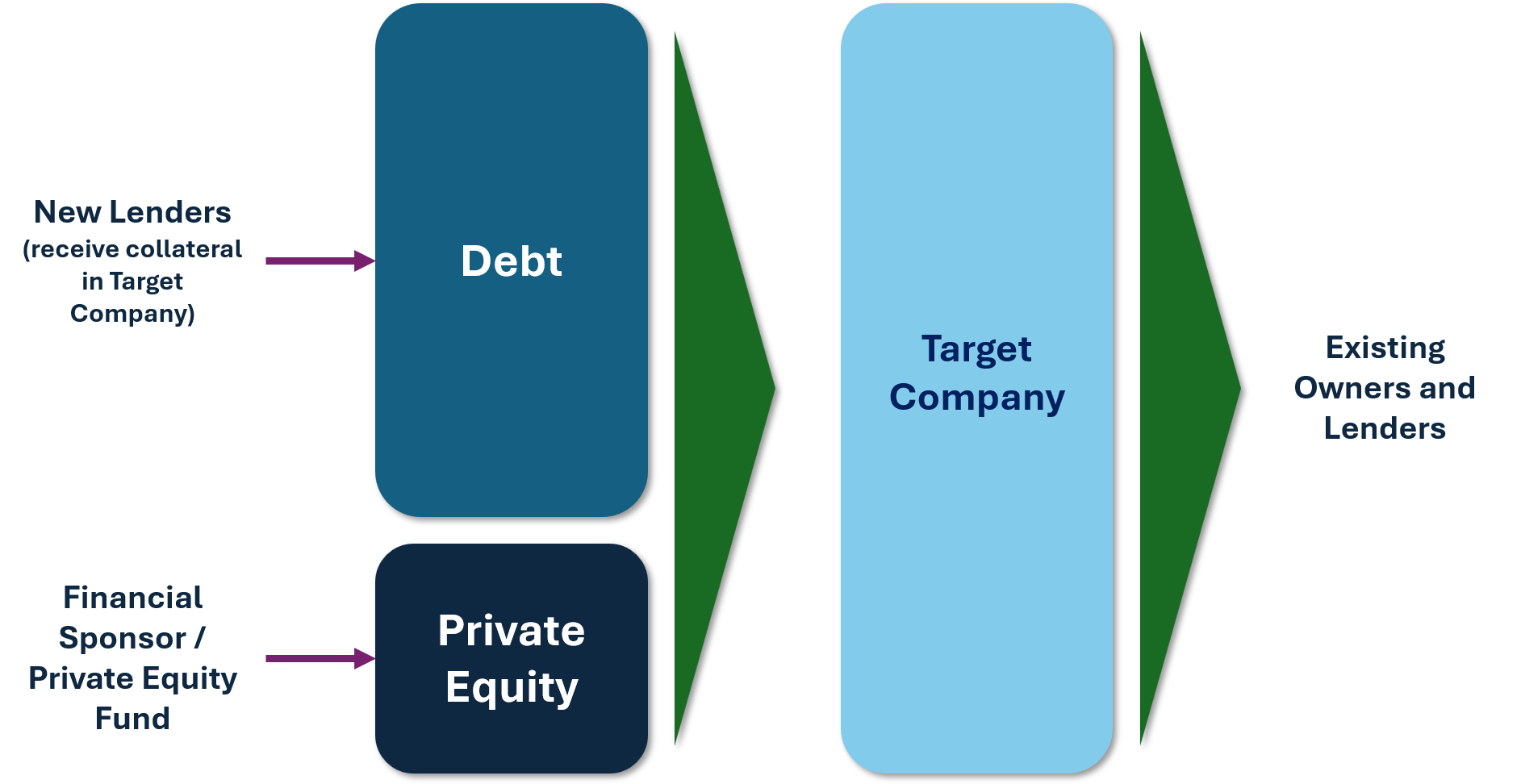
Diagram of the basic structure of a generic leveraged buyout transaction

Leveraged buyout (LBO) refers to a strategy of making equity investments as part of a transaction in which a company, business unit, or business asset is acquired from the current shareholders typically with the use of financial leverage. The companies involved in these transactions are typically mature and generate operating cash flows.

Private-equity firms view target companies as either Platform companies, which have sufficient scale and a successful business model to act as a stand-alone entity, or as add-on / tuck-in / bolt-on acquisitions, which would include companies with insufficient scale or other deficits.

Leveraged buyouts involve a financial sponsor agreeing to an acquisition without itself committing all the capital required for the acquisition. To do this, the financial sponsor will raise acquisition debt, which looks to the cash flows of the acquisition target to make interest and principal payments. Acquisition debt in an LBO is often non-recourse to the financial sponsor and has no claim on other investments managed by the financial sponsor. Therefore, an LBO transaction's financial structure is particularly attractive to a fund's limited partners, allowing them the benefits of leverage, but limiting the degree of recourse of that leverage. This kind of financing structure leverage benefits an LBO's financial sponsor in two ways: (1) the investor only needs to provide a fraction of the capital for the acquisition, and (2) the returns to the investor will be enhanced, as long as the return on assets exceeds the cost of the debt.

As a percentage of the purchase price for a leverage buyout target, the amount of debt used to finance a transaction varies according to the financial condition and history of the acquisition target, market conditions, the willingness of lenders to extend credit (both to the LBO's financial sponsors and the company to be acquired) and the interest costs and the ability of the company to cover those costs. Historically the debt portion of a LBO will range from 60 to 90% of the purchase price. Between 2000 and 2005, debt averaged between 59.4% and 67.9% of total purchase price for LBOs in the United States.

==== Simple example of leveraged buyout ====
A private-equity fund, ABC Capital II, borrows $9bn from a bank (or other lender). To this, it adds $2bn of equity – money from its own partners and from limited partners. With this $11bn, it buys all the shares of an underperforming company, XYZ Industrial (after due diligence, i.e. checking the books). It replaces the senior management in XYZ Industrial, with others who set out to streamline it. The workforce is reduced, some assets are sold off, etc. The objective is to increase the valuation of the company for an early sale.

The stock market is experiencing a bull market, and XYZ Industrial is sold two years after the buy-out for $13bn, yielding a profit of $2bn. The original loan can now be paid off with interest of, say, $0.5bn. The remaining profit of $1.5bn is shared among the partners. Taxation of such gains is at the capital gains tax rates, which in the United States are lower than ordinary income tax rates.

Note that part of that profit results from turning the company around, and part results from the general increase in share prices in a buoyant stock market, the latter often being the greater component.

Notes:

- The lenders (the people who put up the $9bn in the example) can insure against default by syndicating the loan to spread the risk, or by buying credit default swaps (CDSs) or selling collateralised debt obligations (CDOs) from/to other institutions.
- Often the loan/equity ($11bn in the example) is not paid off after the sale, but left on the books of the company (XYZ Industrial) for it to pay off over time. This can be advantageous since the interest is largely off-settable against the profits of the company, thus reducing, or even eliminating, tax.
- Most buyout deals are much smaller; the global average purchase in 2013 was $89m, for example.
- The target company (XYZ Industrials here) does not have to be floated on the stock market; most buyout exits after 2000 are not IPOs.
- Buy-out operations can go wrong and in such cases, the loss is increased by leverage, just as the profit is if all goes well.

=== Growth capital ===
Growth capital refers to equity investments, most often minority investments, in relatively mature companies that are looking for capital to expand or restructure operations, enter new markets or finance a major acquisition without a change of control of the business.

Companies that seek growth capital will often do so in order to finance a transformational event in their life cycle. These companies are likely to be more mature than venture capital-funded companies, able to generate revenue and operating profits, but unable to generate sufficient cash to fund major expansions, acquisitions or other investments. Because of this lack of scale, these companies generally can find few alternative conduits to secure capital for growth, so access to growth equity can be critical to pursue necessary facility expansion, sales and marketing initiatives, equipment purchases, and new product development.

The primary owner of the company may not be willing to take the financial risk alone. By selling part of the company to private equity, the owner can take out some value and share the risk of growth with partners. Capital can also be used to effect a restructuring of a company's balance sheet, particularly to reduce the amount of leverage (or debt) the company has on its balance sheet.

A private investment in public equity (PIPE), refer to a form of growth capital investment made into a publicly traded company. PIPE investments are typically made in the form of a convertible or preferred security that is unregistered for a certain period of time.

The Registered Direct (RD) is another common financing vehicle used for growth capital. A registered direct is similar to a PIPE, but is instead sold as a registered security.

=== Mezzanine capital ===
Mezzanine capital refers to subordinated debt or preferred equity securities that often represent the most junior portion of a company's capital structure that is senior to the company's common equity. This form of financing is often used by private-equity investors to reduce the amount of equity capital required to finance a leveraged buyout or major expansion. Mezzanine capital, which is often used by smaller companies that are unable to access the high yield market, allows such companies to borrow additional capital beyond the levels that traditional lenders are willing to provide through bank loans. In compensation for the increased risk, mezzanine debt holders require a higher return for their investment than secured or other more senior lenders. Mezzanine securities are often structured with a current income coupon.

=== Venture capital ===
Venture capital (VC) is a broad subcategory of private equity that refers to equity investments made, typically in less mature companies, for the launch of a seed or startup company, early-stage development, or expansion of a business. Venture investment is most often found in the application of new technology, new marketing concepts and new products that do not have a proven track record or stable revenue streams.

Venture capital is often subdivided by the stage of development of the company ranging from early-stage capital used for the launch of startup companies to late stage and growth capital that is often used to fund expansion of existing business that are generating revenue but may not yet be profitable or generating cash flow to fund future growth.

Entrepreneurs often develop products and ideas that require substantial capital during the formative stages of their companies' life cycles. Many entrepreneurs do not have sufficient funds to finance projects themselves, and they must, therefore, seek outside financing. The venture capitalist's need to deliver high returns to compensate for the risk of these investments makes venture funding an expensive capital source for companies. Being able to secure financing is critical to any business, whether it is a startup seeking venture capital or a mid-sized firm that needs more cash to grow. Venture capital is most suitable for businesses with large up-front capital requirements which cannot be financed by cheaper alternatives such as debt. Although venture capital is often most closely associated with fast-growing technology, healthcare and biotechnology fields, venture funding has been used for other more traditional businesses.

Investors generally commit to venture capital funds as part of a wider diversified private-equity portfolio, but also to pursue the larger returns the strategy has the potential to offer. However, venture capital funds have produced lower returns for investors over recent years compared to other private-equity fund types, particularly buyout.

=== Distressed securities ===
The category of distressed securities comprises financial strategies for the profitable investment of working capital into the corporate equity and the securities of financially weak companies. The investment of private-equity capital into distressed securities is realised with two financial strategies:

1. "Distressed-to-Control" ("Loan-to-Own") investment whereby the investor buys debt securities in hope of acquiring ownership and control of the company's equity after financing the corporate restructuring of the target company;
2. "Special Situations" ("Turnaround") investment wherein the investor buys debt securities and equity investments, to be used as rescue financing that will restore the profitability of the financially-weak target company.

Moreover, the private-equity investment strategies of hedge funds also include actively trading the loans held and the bonds issued by the financially-weak target companies.

=== Secondaries ===
Secondary investments refer to investments made in existing private-equity assets. These transactions can involve the sale of private equity fund interests or portfolios of direct investments in privately held companies through the purchase of these investments from existing institutional investors. By its nature, the private-equity asset class is illiquid, intended to be a long-term investment for buy and hold investors. Secondary investments allow institutional investors, particularly those new to the asset class, to invest in private equity from older vintages than would otherwise be available to them. Secondaries also typically experience a different cash flow profile, diminishing the j-curve effect of investing in new private-equity funds. Often investments in secondaries are made through third-party fund vehicle, structured similar to a fund of funds although many large institutional investors have purchased private-equity fund interests through secondary transactions. Sellers of private-equity fund investments sell not only the investments in the fund but also their remaining unfunded commitments to the funds.

=== Other strategies ===
Other strategies that can be considered private equity or a close adjacent market include:

- Real estate: in the context of private equity this will typically refer to the riskier end of the investment spectrum including "value-added" and opportunity funds where the investments often more closely resemble leveraged buyouts than traditional real estate investments. Certain investors in private equity consider real estate to be a separate asset class.
- Infrastructure: investments in various public works (e.g., bridges, tunnels, toll roads, airports, public transportation, and other public works) that are made as part of a privatization initiative on the part of a government entity.
- Energy and Power: investments in a wide variety of companies (rather than assets) engaged in the production and sale of energy, including fuel extraction, manufacturing, refining and distribution (Energy) or companies engaged in the production or transmission of electrical power (Power).
- Merchant banking: negotiated private-equity investment by financial institutions in the unregistered securities of either privately or publicly held companies.
- Fund of funds: investments made in a fund whose primary activity is investing in other private-equity funds. The fund of funds model is used by investors looking for:

- Diversification but have insufficient capital to diversify their portfolio by themselves
- Access to top-performing funds that are otherwise oversubscribed
- Experience in a particular fund type or strategy before investing directly in funds in that niche
- Exposure to difficult-to-reach and/or emerging markets
- Superior fund selection by high-talent fund of fund managers/teams

- Search fund: A search fund is an investment vehicle through which an entrepreneur (called a "searcher") raises funds from investors in order to acquire an existing small business. After an acquisition is made, the entrepreneur takes an operating role in the acquired company, such as CEO and President.
- Royalty fund: an investment that purchases a consistent revenue stream deriving from the payment of royalties. One growing subset of this category is the healthcare royalty fund, in which a private-equity fund manager purchases a royalty stream paid by a pharmaceutical company to a drug patent holder. The drug patent holder can be another company, an individual inventor, or some sort of institution, such as a research university.

To compensate for private equities not being traded on the public market, a private-equity secondary market has formed, where private-equity investors purchase securities and assets from other private equity investors.

== History and development ==
=== Early history and the development of venture capital ===
The seeds of the US private-equity industry were planted in 1946 with the founding of two venture capital firms: American Research and Development Corporation (ARDC) and J.H. Whitney & Company. Before World War II, venture capital investments (originally known as "development capital") were primarily the domain of wealthy individuals and families. In 1901 J.P. Morgan arguably managed the first leveraged buyout of the Carnegie Steel Company using private equity. Modern era private equity, however, is credited to Georges Doriot, the "father of venture capitalism" with the founding of ARDC and founder of INSEAD, with capital raised from institutional investors, to encourage private sector investments in businesses run by soldiers who were returning from World War II. ARDC is credited with the first major venture capital success story when its 1957 investment of $70,000 in Digital Equipment Corporation (DEC) would be valued at over $355 million after the company's initial public offering in 1968 (a return of over 5,000 times its investment and an annualized rate of return of 101%). It is commonly noted that the first venture-backed startup is Fairchild Semiconductor, which produced the first commercially practicable integrated circuit, funded in 1959 by what would later become Venrock Associates.

=== Origins of the leveraged buyout ===
The first leveraged buyout may have been the purchase by McLean Industries, Inc. of Pan-Atlantic Steamship Company in January 1955 and Waterman Steamship Corporation in May 1955 Under the terms of that transaction, McLean borrowed $42 million and raised an additional $7 million through an issue of preferred stock. When the deal closed, $20 million of Waterman cash and assets were used to retire $20 million of the loan debt. Lewis Cullman's acquisition of Orkin Exterminating Company in 1964 is often cited as the first leveraged buyout. Similar to the approach employed in the McLean transaction, the use of publicly traded holding companies as investment vehicles to acquire portfolios of investments in corporate assets was a relatively new trend in the 1960s popularized by the likes of Warren Buffett (Berkshire Hathaway) and Victor Posner (DWG Corporation) and later adopted by Nelson Peltz (Triarc), Saul Steinberg (Reliance Insurance) and Gerry Schwartz (Onex Corporation). These investment vehicles would utilize a number of the same tactics and target the same type of companies as more traditional leveraged buyouts and in many ways could be considered a forerunner of the later private-equity firms. Posner is often credited with coining the term "leveraged buyout" or "LBO".

The leveraged buyout boom of the 1980s was conceived by a number of corporate financiers, most notably Jerome Kohlberg Jr. and later his protégé Henry Kravis. Working for Bear Stearns at the time, Kohlberg and Kravis along with Kravis' cousin George Roberts began a series of what they described as "bootstrap" investments. Many of these companies lacked a viable or attractive exit for their founders as they were too small to be taken public and the founders were reluctant to sell out to competitors and so a sale to a financial buyer could prove attractive. In the following years the three Bear Stearns bankers would complete a series of buyouts including Stern Metals (1965), Incom (a division of Rockwood International, 1971), Cobblers Industries (1971), and Boren Clay (1973) and Thompson Wire, Eagle Motors and Barrows through their investment in Stern Metals. By 1976, tensions had built up between Bear Stearns and Kohlberg, Kravis and Roberts leading to their departure and the formation of Kohlberg Kravis Roberts in that year.

=== Private equity in the 1980s ===
In January 1982, former United States Secretary of the Treasury William E. Simon and a group of investors acquired Gibson Greetings, a producer of greeting cards, for $80 million, of which only $1 million was rumored to have been contributed by the investors. By mid-1983, just sixteen months after the original deal, Gibson completed a $290 million IPO and Simon made approximately $66 million.

The success of the Gibson Greetings investment attracted the attention of the wider media to the nascent boom in leveraged buyouts. Between 1979 and 1989, it was estimated that there were over 2,000 leveraged buyouts valued in excess of $250 million.

During the 1980s, constituencies within acquired companies and the media ascribed the "corporate raid" label to many private-equity investments, particularly those that featured a hostile takeover of the company, perceived asset stripping, major layoffs or other significant corporate restructuring activities. Among the most notable investors to be labeled corporate raiders in the 1980s included Carl Icahn, Victor Posner, Nelson Peltz, Robert M. Bass, T. Boone Pickens, Harold Clark Simmons, Kirk Kerkorian, Sir James Goldsmith, Saul Steinberg and Asher Edelman. Carl Icahn developed a reputation as a ruthless corporate raider after his hostile takeover of TWA in 1985. Many of the corporate raiders were onetime clients of Michael Milken, whose investment banking firm, Drexel Burnham Lambert helped raise blind pools of capital with which corporate raiders could make a legitimate attempt to take over a company and provided high-yield debt ("junk bonds") financing of the buyouts.

One of the final major buyouts of the 1980s proved to be its most ambitious and marked both a high-water mark and a sign of the beginning of the end of the boom. In 1989, KKR (Kohlberg Kravis Roberts) closed in on a $31.1 billion takeover of RJR Nabisco. It was, at that time and for over 17 years, the largest leveraged buyout in history. The event was chronicled in the book (and later the movie), Barbarians at the Gate: The Fall of RJR Nabisco. KKR would eventually prevail in acquiring RJR Nabisco at $109 per share, marking a dramatic increase from the original announcement that Shearson Lehman Hutton would take RJR Nabisco private at $75 per share. A fierce series of negotiations and horse-trading ensued which pitted KKR against Shearson and later Forstmann Little & Co. Many of the major banking players of the day, including Morgan Stanley, Goldman Sachs, Salomon Brothers, and Merrill Lynch were actively involved in advising and financing the parties. After Shearson's original bid, KKR quickly introduced a tender offer to obtain RJR Nabisco for $90 per share—a price that enabled it to proceed without the approval of RJR Nabisco's management. RJR's management team, working with Shearson and Salomon Brothers, submitted a bid of $112, a figure they felt certain would enable them to outflank any response by Kravis's team. KKR's final bid of $109, while a lower dollar figure, was ultimately accepted by the board of directors of RJR Nabisco. At $31.1 billion of transaction value, RJR Nabisco was by far the largest leveraged buyouts in history. In 2006 and 2007, a number of leveraged buyout transactions were completed that for the first time surpassed the RJR Nabisco leveraged buyout in terms of nominal purchase price. However, adjusted for inflation, none of the leveraged buyouts of the 2006–2007 period would surpass RJR Nabisco. By the end of the 1980s the excesses of the buyout market were beginning to show, with the bankruptcy of several large buyouts including Robert Campeau's 1988 buyout of Federated Department Stores, the 1986 buyout of the Revco drug stores, Walter Industries, FEB Trucking and Eaton Leonard. Additionally, the RJR Nabisco deal was showing signs of strain, leading to a recapitalization in 1990 that involved the contribution of $1.7 billion of new equity from KKR. In the end, KKR lost $700 million on RJR.

Drexel reached an agreement with the government in which it pleaded nolo contendere (no contest) to six felonies – three counts of stock parking and three counts of stock manipulation. It also agreed to pay a fine of $650 million – at the time, the largest fine ever levied under securities laws. Milken left the firm after his own indictment in March 1989. On 13 February 1990 after being advised by United States Secretary of the Treasury Nicholas F. Brady, the U.S. Securities and Exchange Commission (SEC), the New York Stock Exchange and the Federal Reserve, Drexel Burnham Lambert officially filed for Chapter 11 bankruptcy protection.

=== Age of the mega-buyout: 2005–2007 ===
The combination of decreasing interest rates, loosening lending standards and regulatory changes for publicly traded companies (specifically the 2002 Sarbanes–Oxley Act) would set the stage for the largest boom private equity had seen. Marked by the buyout of Dex Media in 2002, large multibillion-dollar U.S. buyouts could once again obtain significant high yield debt financing, and larger transactions could be completed. By 2004 and 2005, major buyouts were once again becoming common, including the acquisitions of Toys "R" Us, The Hertz Corporation, Metro-Goldwyn-Mayer and SunGard in 2005.

As 2006 began, new "largest buyout" records were set and surpassed several times; nine of the top ten buyouts by the end of 2007 had been announced in an 18-month period from the beginning of 2006 through the middle of 2007. In 2006, private-equity firms bought 654 U.S. companies for $375 billion, representing 18 times the level of transactions closed in 2003. Additionally, U.S.-based private-equity firms raised $215.4 billion in investor commitments to 322 funds, surpassing the previous record set in 2000 by 22% and 33% higher than the 2005 fundraising total The following year, despite the onset of turmoil in the credit markets in the summer, saw yet another record year of fundraising with $302 billion of investor commitments to 415 funds Among the mega-buyouts completed during the 2006 to 2007 boom were: EQ Office, HCA, Alliance Boots and TXU.

In July 2007, the turmoil that had been affecting the mortgage markets, spilled over into the leveraged finance and high-yield debt markets. The markets had been highly robust during the first six months of 2007, with highly issuer friendly developments including PIK and PIK Toggle (interest is "Payable In Kind") and covenant light debt widely available to finance large leveraged buyouts. July and August saw a notable slowdown in issuance levels in the high yield and leveraged loan markets with few issuers accessing the market. Uncertain market conditions led to a significant widening of yield spreads, which coupled with the typical summer slowdown led many companies and investment banks to put their plans to issue debt on hold until the autumn. However, the expected rebound in the market after 1 May 2007 did not materialize, and the lack of market confidence prevented deals from pricing. By the end of September, the full extent of the credit situation became obvious as major lenders including Citigroup and UBS announced major writedowns due to credit losses. The leveraged finance markets came to a near standstill during a week in 2007. As 2008 began, lending standards tightened and the era of "mega-buyouts" came to an end. Nevertheless, private equity continues to be a large and active asset class and the private-equity firms, with hundreds of billions of dollars of committed capital from investors are looking to deploy capital in new and different transactions.

As a result of the 2008 financial crisis, private equity has become subject to increased regulation in Europe and is now subject, among other things, to rules preventing asset stripping of portfolio companies and requiring the notification and disclosure of information in connection with buy-out activity.

=== 2010 onwards: Staying private for longer ===
From 2010 to 2014 KKR, Carlyle, Apollo and Ares went public. Starting from 2018 these companies converted from partnerships into corporations with more shareholder rights and the inclusion in stock indices and mutual fund portfolios. But with the increased availability and scope of funding provided by private markets, many companies are staying private simply because they can. McKinsey & Company reports in its Global Private Markets Review 2018 that global private market fundraising increased by $28.2 billion from 2017, for a total of $748 billion in 2018. Thus, given the abundance of private capital available, companies no longer require public markets for sufficient funding. Benefits may include avoiding the cost of an IPO, maintaining more control of the company, and having the 'legroom' to think long-term rather than focus on short-term or quarterly figures.

A new feature in the 2020s was regulated platforms which fractionalized the assets, making possible individual investments of $10,000 or less.

Private equity deal-making in the United Kingdom surged in 2024, with total investment reaching £63 billion, just 7% below the record high of £68 billion in 2021. According to Dealogic, there were 305 private equity deals in 2024, marking a significant increase from 229 deals in 2023. The uptick in activity was driven by improving financial conditions and a rebound in investor confidence after a period of high interest rates in 2022 and 2023, which had slowed deal flow.

Notable 2024 acquisitions included:

- Hargreaves Lansdown – a £5.4 billion takeover of the FTSE 100 financial services firm.
- International Distribution Services (Royal Mail's parent company) – acquired for £3.6 billion.
- Darktrace – a £4.2 billion acquisition by Thoma Bravo, a private equity firm specializing in technology investments.

The rapid pace of acquisitions also contributed to the decline in the number of listed companies in London, as private equity firms increasingly targeted publicly traded businesses. Research by Goldman Sachs showed that the London Stock Exchange experienced its fastest pace of shrinkage in over a decade due to private equity takeovers.

However, concerns have been raised regarding the financial health of private equity-backed companies. The Bank of England issued a warning in 2024, stating that businesses owned by private equity firms were more vulnerable to default than other large businesses. The central bank's research found that more than 2 million people in the UK were employed by firms engaged with private equity and that these companies were responsible for 15% of all corporate debt. A report the same year by Moody's Ratings found that globally, companies backed by large private equity firms were twice as likely to default as companies not backed by private equity.

Despite these risks, private equity interest in undervalued British companies has continued into 2025. As of early 2025, 19 deals worth a total of £2.9 billion have already been announced, highlighting the sector's continued expansion.

Global buyout deal value, excluding add-on acquisitions, rose 44% to $904 billion in 2025, while the number of deals fell 6% to 3,018. Bain & Company reported that the increase was concentrated in larger transactions.

== Investments in private equity ==
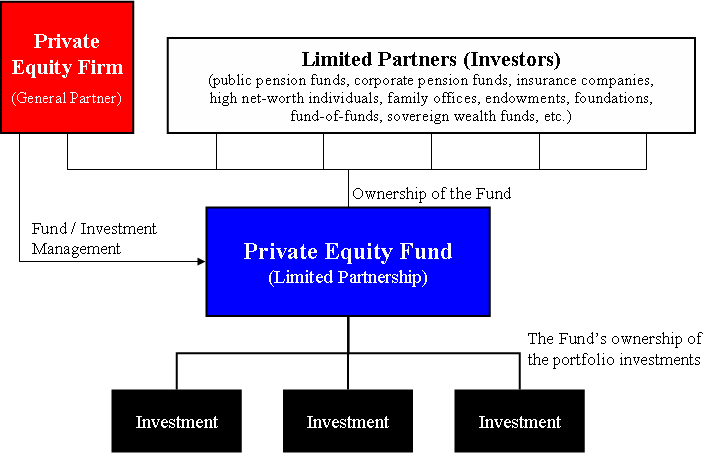
Diagram of the structure of a generic private-equity fund

Although the capital for private equity originally came from individual investors or corporations, in the 1970s, private equity became an asset class in which various institutional investors allocated capital in the hopes of achieving risk-adjusted returns that exceed those possible in the public equity markets. In the 1980s, insurers were major private-equity investors. Later, public pension funds and university and other endowments became more significant sources of capital. For most institutional investors, private-equity investments are made as part of a broad asset allocation that includes traditional assets (e.g., public equity and bonds) and other alternative assets (e.g., hedge funds, real estate, collectables).

=== Investor categories ===
US, Canadian and European public and private pension schemes have invested in the asset class since the early 1980s to diversify away from their core holdings (public equity and fixed income). Today pension investment in private equity accounts for more than a third of all monies allocated to the asset class, ahead of other institutional investors such as insurance companies, endowments, and sovereign wealth funds.

=== Direct versus indirect investment ===
Most institutional investors do not invest directly in privately held companies, lacking the expertise and resources necessary to structure and monitor the investment. Instead, institutional investors will invest indirectly through a private equity fund. Certain institutional investors have the scale necessary to develop a diversified portfolio of private-equity funds themselves, while others will invest through a fund of funds to allow a portfolio more diversified than one a single investor could construct.

=== Investment timescales ===
Returns on private-equity investments are created through one or a combination of three factors that include: debt repayment or cash accumulation through cash flows from operations, operational improvements that increase earnings over the life of the investment and multiple expansion, selling the business for a higher price than was originally paid. A key component of private equity as an asset class for institutional investors is that investments are typically realized after some period of time, which will vary depending on the investment strategy. Private-equity investment returns are typically realized through one of the following avenues:

- an initial public offering (IPO) – shares of the company are offered to the public, typically providing a partial immediate realization to the financial sponsor and a public market into which it can later sell additional shares;
- a merger or acquisition – the company is sold for either cash or shares in another company;
- a recapitalization – cash is distributed to the shareholders (in this case the financial sponsor) and its private-equity funds either from cash flow generated by the company or through raising debt or other securities to fund the distribution.

Large institutional asset owners such as pension funds (with typically long-dated liabilities), insurance companies, sovereign wealth and national reserve funds have a generally low likelihood of facing liquidity shocks in the medium term, and thus can afford the required long holding periods characteristic of private-equity investment.

The median horizon for a LBO transaction is eight years.

== Liquidity in the private-equity market ==
The private-equity secondary market (also often called private-equity secondaries) refers to the buying and selling of pre-existing investor commitments to private equity and other alternative investment funds. Sellers of private-equity investments sell not only the investments in the fund but also their remaining unfunded commitments to the funds. By its nature, the private-equity asset class is illiquid, intended to be a long-term investment for buy-and-hold investors. For the vast majority of private-equity investments, there is no listed public market; however, there is a robust and maturing secondary market available for sellers of private-equity assets.

Increasingly, secondaries are considered a distinct asset class with a cash flow profile that is not correlated with other private-equity investments. As a result, investors are allocating capital to secondary investments to diversify their private-equity programs. Driven by strong demand for private-equity exposure, a significant amount of capital has been committed to secondary investments from investors looking to increase and diversify their private-equity exposure.

Investors seeking access to private equity have been restricted to investments with structural impediments such as long lock-up periods, lack of transparency, unlimited leverage, concentrated holdings of illiquid securities and high investment minimums.

Secondary transactions can be generally divided into two primary categories:

=== LP Interest Secondaries (Sale of Fund Interests) ===
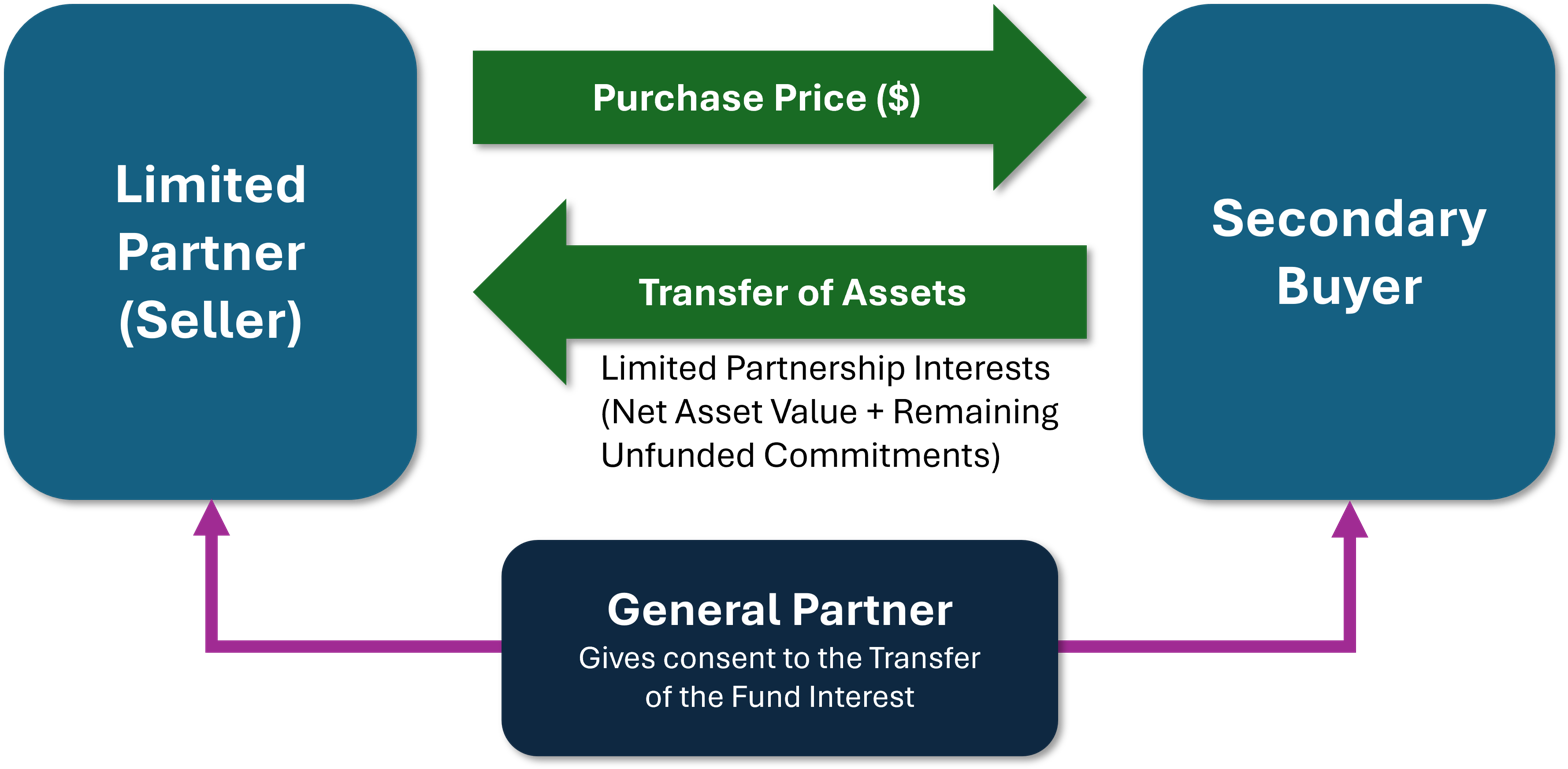
Diagram of a simple secondary market transfer of a limited-partnership fund interest. The buyer exchanges a single cash payment to the seller for both the investments in the fund plus any unfunded commitments to the fund.

This is the most common type of secondary transaction, involving the sale of an investor's interest in a private-equity fund or a portfolio of multiple fund interests. Transactions may take several forms:

- Traditional Sale – A simple transfer of limited partnership interests in one or more private equity funds. In these transactions, the buyer pays to purchase the interest and assumes any remaining unfunded commitments associated with the interest. The purchase price may be paid entirely upfront in cash or through a deferred payment plan. Often, these deferrals will be fully committed by the buyer to be paid over a period of 6 months to 2 years although. The timing of payments is often a highly negotiated part of this transaction.
- Structured Joint Ventures – A customized transaction where buyers and sellers agree on shared ownership structures, often a waterfall of distributions with various sharing between buyer and seller tied to the performance of the underlying portfolio. Typically, the purchase price, timing of payments as well as the funding of remaining unfunded commitments will also be heavily negotiated. Other variants include the Managed Fund in which the seller retains management of the portfolio in order to retain its relationships with the private equity managers in the portfolio and the buyer acquires the economic ownership of the portfolio.
- Securitization – The seller contributes fund interests into a vehicle that issues notes, generating partial liquidity.
- Early Secondaries or Late Primaries– Involves selling interests in young funds that have called less than one-third of committed capital. In some cases, secondary investors will make a primary commitment to a fund that is already substantially invested (often in excess of 35%) in order to capture an uplift in the valuation in the fund during the fundraising period. In some cases a manager may reopen the fundraising for a fund that had already had a final closing.

=== GP-Led Secondaries ===
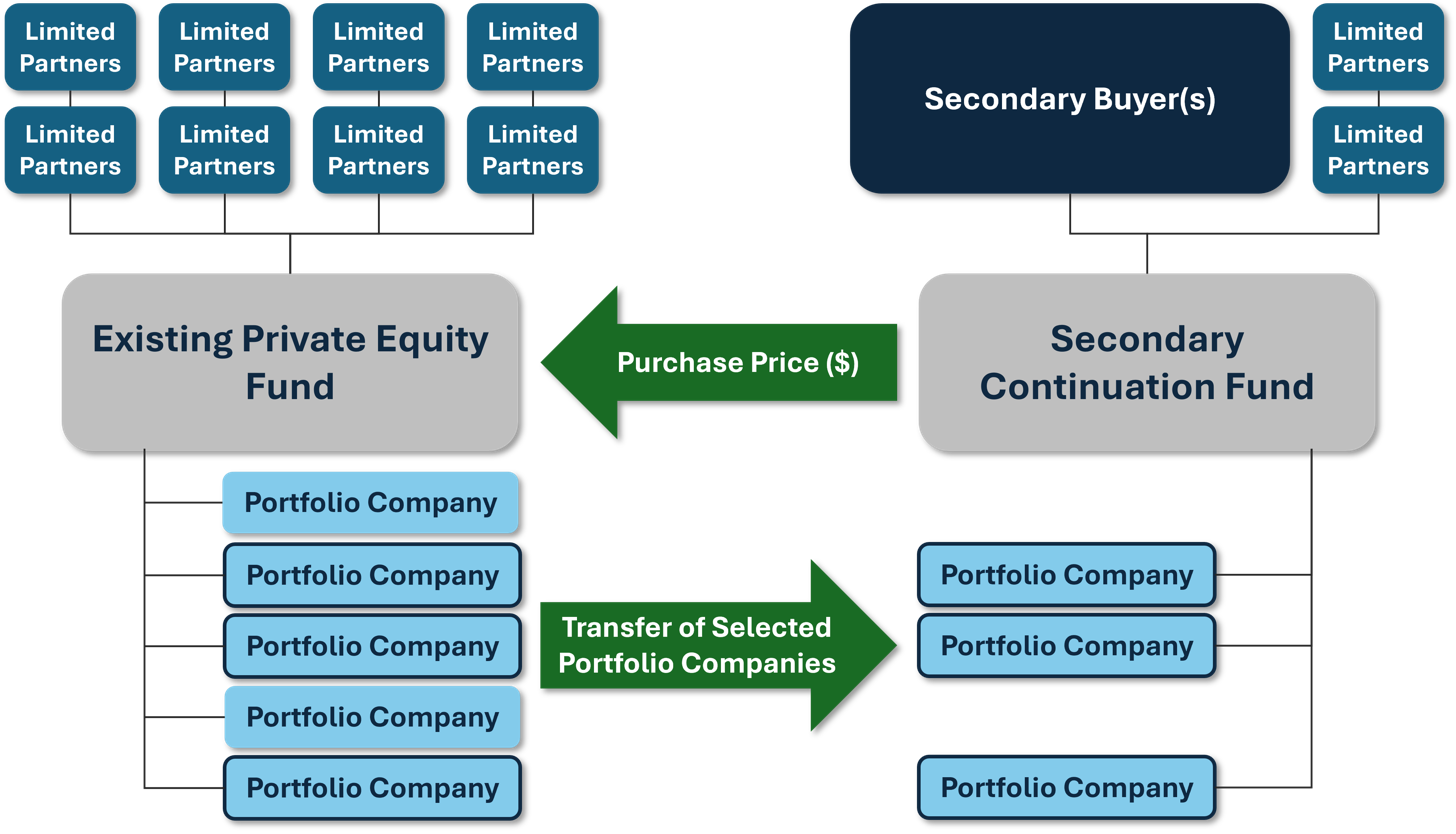
Diagram of a GP-Led secondary market transfer of private equity companies through a Continuation Fund

Also known as GP-Centered, secondary directs or synthetic secondaries, these transactions involve the sale of a portfolio of direct investments in portfolio companies. Subcategories include:

- Continuation funds - The most common form of GP-led transaction in which the buyer uses a new private equity fund vehicle (the Continuation Fund) to allow a fund manager to extend the holding of one of its existing portfolio companies (Single-Asset Continuation Fund) or several existing portfolio companies (Multi-Asset Continuation Fund) from one or more existing funds. This allows the manager to maintain control of its best-performing assets while giving existing limited partners the option to receive early liquidity. Existing investors will typically have an option to re-invest their investment into the new Continuation Fund.
- Fund Recapitalization - The buyer uses a new private equity fund vehicle (the Realization Fund) to allow a fund manager to provide liquidity to existing limited partners in a private equity fund purchasing all (or nearly all) of the remaining portfolio companies. Existing investors will typically have an option to rollover their investment into the new Realization Fund.
- Stapled Secondaries – A secondary buyer acquires interests in an existing fund while also committing capital to a new fund being raised by the manager. In certain cases a manager will sponsor a "tender offer" to all of its limited partners, although this practice has waned in the 2020s with the increasing usage of continuation funds. A cornerstone secondary is a transaction in which the manager coordinates a stapled secondary from one or more of its largest existing investors, who may be choosing not to make a new commitment to the manager's successor fund.
- Secondary Directs – The buyer purchases a portfolio of direct private-equity investments from a corporation or institution often through a newly formed private equity fund vehicle typically without an incumbent manager.
- Spinout or Synthetic Secondaries – Investors acquire interests in a newly formed limited partnership holding direct investments often to facilitate the spinout of a captive private equity investment team from a bank, insurance company or asset management platform.

== Private-equity firms ==
According to Private Equity International's latest PEI 300 ranking, the largest private-equity firm in the world today is The Blackstone Group based on the amount of private-equity direct-investment capital raised over a five-year window.

As ranked by the PEI 300, the 15 largest private-equity firms in the world in 2024 were:

1. Blackstone Inc.
2. Kohlberg Kravis Roberts
3. EQT AB
4. CVC Capital Partners
5. TPG Capital
6. The Carlyle Group
7. Thoma Bravo
8. Advent International
9. Warburg Pincus
10. Hg
11. Clayton, Dubilier & Rice
12. Silver Lake
13. Hellman & Friedman
14. Vista Equity Partners
15. General Atlantic

Because private-equity firms are continuously in the process of raising, investing and distributing their private equity funds, capital raised can often be the easiest to measure. Other metrics can include the total value of companies purchased by a firm or an estimate of the size of a firm's active portfolio plus capital available for new investments. As with any list that focuses on size, the list does not provide any indication as to relative investment performance of these funds or managers.

Preqin, an independent data provider, ranks the 25 largest private-equity investment managers. Among the larger firms in the 2017 ranking were AlpInvest Partners, Ardian (formerly AXA Private Equity), AIG Investments, and Goldman Sachs Alternatives. Invest Europe publishes a yearbook which analyses industry trends derived from data disclosed by over 1,300 European private-equity funds. Finally, websites such as AskIvy.net provide lists of London-based private-equity firms.

=== Versus hedge funds ===
The investment strategies of private-equity firms differ from those of hedge funds. Typically, private-equity investment groups are geared towards long-hold, multiple-year investment strategies in illiquid assets (whole companies, large-scale real estate projects, or other tangibles not easily converted to cash) where they have more control and influence over operations or asset management to influence their long-term returns. Hedge funds usually focus on short or medium term liquid securities which are more quickly convertible to cash, and they do not have direct control over the business or asset in which they are investing. Both private-equity firms and hedge funds often specialize in specific types of investments and transactions. Private-equity specialization is usually in specific industry sector asset management while hedge fund specialization is in industry sector risk capital management. Private-equity strategies can include wholesale purchase of a privately held company or set of assets, mezzanine financing for startup projects, growth capital investments in existing businesses or leveraged buyout of a publicly held asset converting it to private control. Finally, private-equity firms only take long positions.

== Private-equity funds ==
Private-equity fundraising refers to the action of private-equity firms seeking capital from investors for their funds. Typically an investor will invest in a specific fund managed by a firm, becoming a limited partner in the fund, rather than an investor in the firm itself. As a result, an investor will only benefit from investments made by a firm where the investment is made from the specific fund in which it has invested.

- Fund of funds. These are private-equity funds that invest in other private-equity funds in order to provide investors with a lower risk product through exposure to a large number of vehicles often of different type and regional focus. Fund of funds accounted for 14% of global commitments made to private-equity funds in 2006.
- Individuals with substantial net worth. Substantial net worth is often required of investors by the law, since private-equity funds are generally less regulated than ordinary mutual funds. For example, in the US, most funds require potential investors to qualify as accredited investors, which requires $1 million of net worth, $200,000 of individual income, or $300,000 of joint income (with spouse) for two documented years and an expectation that such income level will continue.

As fundraising has grown over the past few years, so too has the number of investors in the average fund. In 2004, there were 26 investors in the average private-equity fund, this figure has now grown to 42 according to Preqin ltd. (formerly known as Private Equity Intelligence).

The managers of private-equity funds will also invest in their own vehicles, typically providing between 1–5% of the overall capital.

Often private-equity fund managers will employ the services of external fundraising teams known as placement agents in order to raise capital for their vehicles. The use of placement agents has grown over the past few years, with 40% of funds closed in 2006 employing their services, according to Preqin ltd. Placement agents will approach potential investors on behalf of the fund manager, and will typically take a fee of around 1% of the commitments that they are able to garner.

The amount of time that a private-equity firm spends raising capital varies depending on the level of interest among investors, which is defined by current market conditions and also the track record of previous funds raised by the firm in question. Firms can spend as little as one or two months raising capital when they are able to reach the target that they set for their funds relatively easily, often through gaining commitments from existing investors in their previous funds, or where strong past performance leads to strong levels of investor interest. Other managers may find fundraising taking considerably longer, with managers of less popular fund types finding the fundraising process more tough. It can take up to two years to raise capital, although the majority of fund managers will complete fundraising within nine months to fifteen months.

Once a fund has reached its fundraising target, it will have a final close. After this point it is not normally possible for new investors to invest in the fund, unless they were to purchase an interest in the fund on the secondary market.

=== Size of the industry ===
The state of the industry around the end of 2011 was as follows.

Private-equity assets under management probably exceeded $2 trillion at the end of March 2012, and funds available for investment totaled $949bn (about 47% of overall assets under management).

Approximately $246bn of private equity was invested globally in 2011, down 6% on the previous year and around two-thirds below the peak activity in 2006 and 2007. Following on from a strong start, deal activity slowed in the second half of 2011 due to concerns over the global economy and sovereign debt crisis in Europe. There was $93bn in investments during the first half of this year as the slowdown persisted into 2012. This was down a quarter on the same period in the previous year. Private-equity backed buyouts generated some 6.9% of global M&A volume in 2011 and 5.9% in the first half of 2012. This was down on 7.4% in 2010 and well below the all-time high of 21% in 2006. Global M&A activity reached $2.8 trillion in the first half of 2026, driven by a rise in major deals.

Global exit activity totalled $252bn in 2011, practically unchanged from the previous year, but well up on 2008 and 2009 as private-equity firms sought to take advantage of improved market conditions at the start of the year to realise investments. Exit activity however, has lost momentum following a peak of $113bn in the second quarter of 2011. TheCityUK estimates total exit activity of some $100bn in the first half of 2012, well down on the same period in the previous year.

The fund raising environment remained stable for the third year running in 2011 with $270bn in new funds raised, slightly down on the previous year's total. Around $130bn in funds was raised in the first half of 2012, down around a fifth on the first half of 2011. The average time for funds to achieve a final close fell to 16.7 months in the first half of 2012, from 18.5 months in 2011. Private-equity funds available for investment ("dry powder") totalled $949bn at the end of q1-2012, down around 6% on the previous year. Including unrealised funds in existing investments, private-equity funds under management probably totalled over $2.0 trillion.

Public pensions are a major source of capital for private-equity funds. Increasingly, sovereign wealth funds are growing as an investor class for private equity.

Private Equity was invested in 13% of the Pharma 1000 in 2021 according to Torreya with Eight Roads Ventures having the highest number of investments in this industry.

=== Private-equity fund performance ===
Due to limited disclosure, studying the returns to private equity is relatively difficult. Unlike mutual funds, private-equity funds need not disclose performance data. And, as they invest in private companies, it is difficult to examine the underlying investments. It is challenging to compare private-equity performance to public-equity performance, in particular because private-equity fund investments are drawn and returned over time as investments are made and subsequently realized.

An oft-cited academic paper (Kaplan and Schoar, 2005) suggests that the net-of-fees returns to PE funds are roughly comparable to the S&P 500 (or even slightly under). This analysis may actually overstate the returns because it relies on voluntarily reported data and hence suffers from survivorship bias (i.e. funds that fail will not report data). One should also note that these returns are not risk-adjusted. A 2012 paper by Harris, Jenkinson and Kaplan, 2012 found that average buyout fund returns in the U.S. have actually exceeded that of public markets. These findings were supported by earlier work, using a data set from Robinson and Sensoy in 2011.

Commentators have argued that a standard methodology is needed to present an accurate picture of performance, to make individual private-equity funds comparable and so the asset class as a whole can be matched against public markets and other types of investment. It is also claimed that PE fund managers manipulate data to present themselves as strong performers, which makes it even more essential to standardize the industry.

Two other findings in Kaplan and Schoar in 2005: First, there is considerable variation in performance across PE funds. Second, unlike the mutual fund industry, there appears to be performance persistence in PE funds. That is, PE funds that perform well over one period, tend to also perform well the next period. Persistence is stronger for VC firms than for LBO firms.

The application of the Freedom of Information Act (FOIA) in certain states in the United States has made certain performance data more readily available. Specifically, FOIA has required certain public agencies to disclose private-equity performance data directly on their websites.

In the United Kingdom, the second largest market for private equity, more data has become available since the 2007 publication of the David Walker Guidelines for Disclosure and Transparency in Private Equity.

== List of private equity billionaires ==
Below is a partial list of billionaires who acquired their wealth through private equity.

Name	Net worth (USD)	Firm	Nationality
Stephen A. Schwarzman	$32 billion	Blackstone Group	United States
Henry Kravis	$11.7 billion	Kohlberg Kravis Roberts	United States
Orlando Bravo	$8.7 billion	Thoma Bravo	United States
Marc Rowan	$6.5 billion	Apollo Global Management	United States
David Bonderman	$6.4 billion	TPG Capital	United States
George R. Roberts	$5.9 billion	Kohlberg Kravis Roberts	United States
James Coulter	$4.4 billion	TPG Capital	United States
Daniel A. D'Aniello	$4.2 billion	The Carlyle Group	United States
William E. Conway Jr.	$3.6 billion	The Carlyle Group	United States
Carl Thoma	$3.5 billion	Thoma Bravo	United States
David Rubenstein	$3.2 billion	The Carlyle Group	United States
Peter G. Peterson	$2.8 billion before death	Blackstone Group	United States
Jerome Kohlberg Jr.	$1.5 billion before death	Kohlberg Kravis Roberts	United States
Conni Jonsson	$1.5 billion	EQT AB	Sweden
Harry Klagsbrun	$1.1 billion	EQT AB	Sweden

== Taxes ==
Income to private equity firms is primarily in the form of "carried interest", typically 20% of the profits generated by investments made by the firm, and a "management fee", often 2% of the principal invested in the firm by the outside investors whose money the firm holds. As a result of a tax loophole enshrined in the U.S. tax code, carried interest that accrues to private equity firms is treated as capital gains, which is taxed at a lower rate than is ordinary income. Currently, the long term capital gains tax rate is 20% compared with the 37% top ordinary income tax rate for individuals. This loophole has been estimated to cost the government $130 billion over the next decade in unrealized revenue. Armies of corporate lobbyists and huge private equity industry donations to political campaigns in the United States have ensured that this powerful industry receives this favorable tax treatment by the government. Private equity firms retain close to 200 lobbyists and over the last decade have made almost $600 million in political campaign contributions.

In addition, through an accounting maneuver called "fee waiver", private equity firms often also treat management fee income as capital gains. The U.S. Internal Revenue Service (IRS) lacks the manpower and the expertise that would be necessary to track compliance with even these already quite favorable legal requirements. In fact, the IRS conducts nearly no income tax audits of the industry. As a result of the complexity of the accounting that arises from the fact that most private equity firms are organized as large partnerships, such that the firm's profits are apportioned to each of the many partners, a number of private equity firms fail to comply with tax laws, according to industry whistleblowers.

== Debate ==
=== Carried interest ===
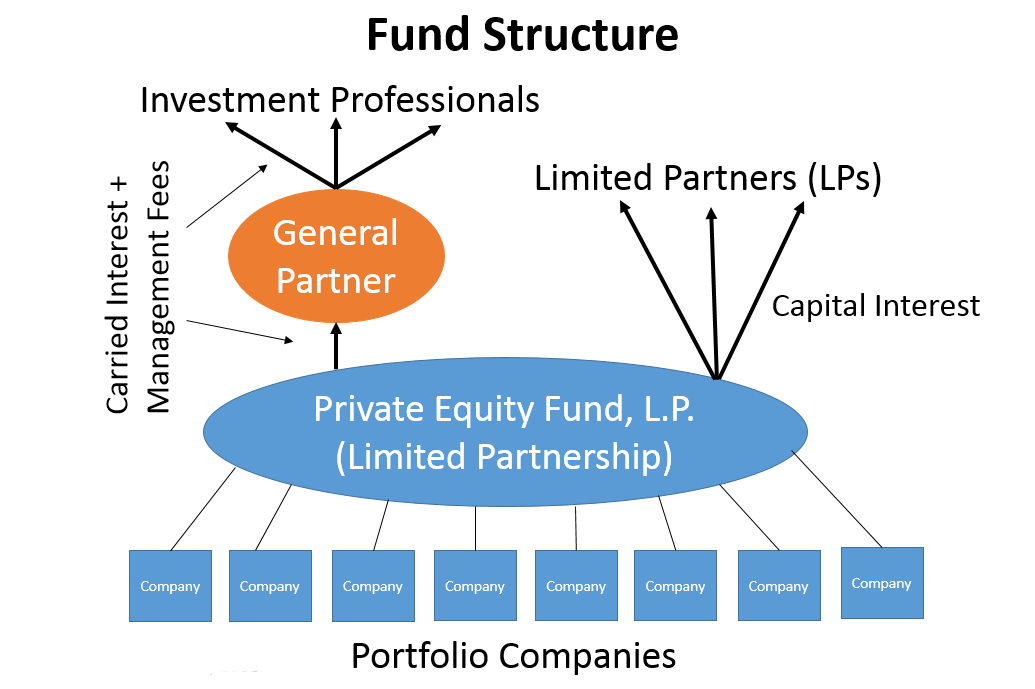
Structure of a private equity or hedge fund, which shows the carried interest and management fee received by the fund's investment managers. The general partner is the financial entity used to control and manage the fund, while the limited partners are the individual investors. The investment managers work as the general partner and are also a partner in the limited partnership. Limited partners collect their return on their capital interest.

Carried interest, or carry, in finance, is a share of the profits of an investment paid to the investment manager specifically in alternative investments (private equity and hedge funds). It is a performance fee, rewarding the manager for enhancing performance. Since these fees are generally not taxed as normal income, some believe that the structure unfairly takes advantage of favorable tax treatment, e.g. in the United States. In this regard, it is often referred to as the carried interest loophole. The Hill referred to it as "Wall Street's favorite tax break."

=== Effects ===
PE's interest in short term profits without regard for the long term effects and the ability to "make money even if their companies blow up" can lead to job loss, raised prices, asset stripping and increased likelihood of bankruptcy for companies acquired.

=== Loss of innovation and quality ===
When a private equity entity invests in a company, industry or public service, there have been reports of reduced quality, both in terms of services and goods produced. While a private equity investment into a business might result in short-term improvements, such as new staff and equipment, the incentive is to maximize profits, not necessarily the quality of products or services. Over time, cost-cutting has also been common, and deferring further investments. Private equity investors may also be incentivized to make short-term gains by selling a company once a certain level of profitability is achieved or simply selling off its assets if that is not possible. Both of these situations, and others, can result in a loss of innovation and quality.

=== Recording private equity ===
There is a debate around the distinction between private equity and foreign direct investment (FDI), and whether to treat them separately. The difference is blurred on account of private equity not entering the country through the stock market. Private equity generally flows to unlisted firms and to firms where the percentage of shares is smaller than the promoter- or investor-held shares (also known as free-floating shares). The main point of contention is that FDI is used solely for production, whereas in the case of private equity the investor can reclaim their money after a revaluation period and make investments in other financial assets. At present, most countries report private equity as a part of FDI.

=== Transparency ===
The lack of transparency has raised concerns of exploitation and money laundering.

=== Healthcare investments ===
Some studies have shown that private-equity investments in health care and related services, such as nursing homes and hospitals, have decreased the quality of care while driving up costs. Researchers at the Becker Friedman Institute of the University of Chicago found that private-equity ownership of nursing homes increased the short-term mortality of Medicare patients by 10%. Treatment by private-equity owned health care providers tends to be associated with a higher rate of "surprise bills". Private equity ownership of dermatology practices has led to pressure to increase profitability, concerns about up-charging and patient safety. In a 2024 study of 51 private equity–acquired hospitals matched with 250 controls, the former had a 25% increase in hospital-acquired conditions, such as falls and central line-associated bloodstream infections.

=== Incentives ===
Loans lent for private-equity acquisitions are often sold to others as securities leaving the original lender uninvolved with the outcome of the loan.

=== Wealth capture ===
According to conservative Oren Cass, private equity captures wealth rather than creating it, and this capture can be "zero-sum, or even value-destroying, in aggregate". He describes "assets get shuffled and reshuffled, profits get made, but relatively little flows toward actual productive uses".

=== Influence on inequality ===
Bloomberg Businessweek states that:

PE may contribute to inequality in several ways. First, it offers investors higher returns than those available in public stocks and bonds markets. Yet, to enjoy those returns, it helps to already be rich. Private-equity funds are open solely to "qualified" (read: high-net-worth) individual investors and to institutions such as endowments. Only some workers get indirect exposure via pension funds. Second, PE puts pressure on the lower end of the wealth divide. Companies can be broken up, merged, or generally restructured to increase efficiency and productivity, which inevitably means job cuts.

== See also ==
- Common ordinary equity
- History of private equity and venture capital
- Holding company
- List of private equity owned companies that have filed for bankruptcy
- Private equity fund
- Private investment in public equity
- Publicly traded private equity
- Specialized investment fund
- Search fund
- Vulture capitalist
- Enshittification

=== Organizations ===
- Institutional Limited Partners Association – advocacy organization for investors in private equity
- American Investment Council – advocacy and research organization for the industry
