= 2024 opinion polling for the 2026 Israeli legislative election =

In the run up to the 2026 Israeli legislative election, various organisations are conducting opinion polling to gauge voting intention in Israel during the term of the twenty-fifth Knesset. This article lists the results of such polls between 3 January and 27 December 2024. In keeping with the election silence law, no polls may be published from the end of the Friday before the election until the polling stations close on election day at 22:00.

Polls are listed in reverse chronological order, showing the most recent first and using the dates when the survey fieldwork was done, as opposed to the date of publication. Where the fieldwork dates are unknown, the date of publication is given instead.

== Seat projections ==
This section displays voting intention estimates referring to the next Knesset election. The figures listed are Knesset seat counts rather than percentages. Scenario polls are not included here.

=== Guide to the table ===
Parties that fall below the electoral threshold of 3.25% are normally denoted by the percentage of votes that they received, shown in parentheses, e.g. (1.2%), rather than by the number of seats they would have received. If a poll has no information on a particular party, or states that it does not meet the electoral threshold without providing details, that party is instead marked by a dash (–).

The party receiving the highest number of projected seats has its figure displayed in bold with the background shaded in the party's colour. In the case of a tie, the parties tying for the highest number of projected seats have their figures displayed in bold with the backgrounds shaded in their colours.

The 37th government parties and alliances (Likud, Religious Zionist Party, Otzma Yehudit, Shas, and United Torah Judaism) are highlighted. The sum of their projected seats is shown in the column headed "Gov." If that sum constitutes a majority of the Knesset (61 or more seats), it is highlighted and bolded.

=== Polls ===
Fieldwork date	Polling firm	Publisher	Likud	Yesh Atid	RZP	Otzma	National Unity	Shas	UTJ	Yisrael Beiteinu	Ra'am	Hadash –Ta'al	Dems	Balad	New Hope (Note: Joined the government in 30 September)	Bennett party	Lead	Gov.
27 Dec	LRI+P4A	Maariv	**23**	16	–	8	20	10	7	15	4	6	11	–	–	–	3	48
27 Dec	LRI+P4A	Maariv	21	11	(1.8%)	7	13	9	7	8	5	6	9	–	(0.9%)	**24**	3	44
26 Dec	SF+DP	Channel 14	**32**	9	4	8	13	10	8	13	5	5	13	(2.4%)	(0.5%)	–	19	**62**
25 Dec	Midgam R&C	HaHadashot 12	**23**	15	4	8	19	9	7	14	5	5	11	(3.0%)	(0.6%)	–	4	51
25 Dec	Midgam R&C	HaHadashot 12	**22**	11	(3.0%)	8	12	9	7	10	5	5	10	(3.0%)	(0.5%)	21	1	46
18–19 Dec	LRI+P4A	Maariv	**24**	15	(1.6%)	9	20	9	7	14	4	6	12	(2.2%)	(1.8%)	–	4	49
18–19 Dec	LRI+P4A	Maariv	21	11	(1.3%)	8	13	8	7	8	4	6	9	–	(0.4%)	**25**	4	44
13 Dec	Kantar	Kan 11	**26**	15	(2.8%)	8	19	10	8	14	5	5	10	(2.1%)	(1.3%)	–	7	52
13 Dec	Kantar	Kan 11	**24**	9	(1.8%)	8	10	10	8	9	5	5	10	(2.0%)	(1.5%)	22	2	50
12 Dec	SF+DP	Channel 14	**34**	10	5	6	14	10	8	11	5	5	12	(2.2%)	(0.2%)	–	20	**63**
12 Dec	Midgam R&C	HaHadashot 12	**25**	16	(2.1%)	9	19	9	8	13	5	5	11	(2.4%)	(1.0%)	–	6	51
12 Dec	Midgam R&C	HaHadashot 12	**23**	11	–	8	11	9	8	8	5	5	10	–	–	22	1	48
11–12 Dec	LRI+P4A	Maariv	**25**	14	(2.4%)	8	19	10	7	14	5	5	13	(2.0%)	(0.6%)	–	6	50
11–12 Dec	LRI+P4A	Maariv	21	11	(1.3%)	8	13	8	7	8	4	6	9	–	(0.4%)	**25**	4	44
11 Dec	MM+SN	Channel 13	**26**	13	5	9	19	10	7	12	4	5	10	(2.9%)	(0.8%)	–	7	57
11 Dec	MM+SN	Channel 13	24	8	5	8	9	9	7	7	4	5	8	–	–	**26**	2	53
4–5 Dec	LRI+P4A	Maariv	**22**	15	4	7	19	9	8	14	5	5	12	(2.0%)	(1.9%)	–	3	50
4–5 Dec	LRI+P4A	Maariv	20	11	(2.5%)	7	13	8	7	7	5	5	10	(2.1%)	(1.4%)	**27**	7	42
29 Nov	LRI+P4A	Maariv	**24**	15	4	7	19	9	7	14	5	5	11	(1.7%)	(1.1%)	–	5	51
29 Nov	LRI+P4A	Maariv	21	12	–	7	13	8	8	7	5	5	9	–	–	**25**	4	44
28 Nov	SF+DP	Channel 14	**31**	8	4	8	14	10	8	15	5	5	12	(1.9%)	(0.3%)	–	16	**61**
26 Nov	Midgam R&C	HaHadashot 12	**25**	15	(2.3%)	9	18	9	8	14	5	5	12	(1.7%)	(1.1%)	–	7	51
26 Nov	Midgam R&C	HaHadashot 12	**23**	10	(2.0%)	7	10	9	8	9	5	5	11	(1.7%)	(0.6%)	**23**	Tie	47
20–21 Nov	LRI+P4A	Maariv	**25**	15	(3.0%)	8	19	9	8	14	5	5	12	(2.4%)	(0.6%)	–	6	50
20–21 Nov	LRI+P4A	Maariv	21	12	–	7	14	8	8	7	5	5	9	–	–	**24**	3	44
19 Nov	SF+DP	Channel 14	**33**	8	4	6	14	11	8	14	5	5	12	(2.2%)	(0.7%)	–	19	**62**
18 Nov	Midgam R&C	HaHadashot 12	**26**	15	(2.8%)	8	19	9	8	13	5	5	12	(2.4%)	(0.9%)	–	7	51
18 Nov	Midgam R&C	HaHadashot 12	**24**	10	–	6	10	9	8	9	5	5	11	–	–	23	1	47
15 Nov	LRI+P4A	Maariv	**23**	14	(2.2%)	8	20	10	7	15	5	5	13	(1.8%)	(3.0%)	–	3	48
15 Nov	LRI+P4A	Maariv	21	11	–	7	13	9	7	7	5	5	9	–	–	**26**	5	44
8 Nov	LRI+P4A	Maariv	**24**	15	(2.9%)	8	19	10	7	14	5	5	13	(1.6%)	(1.9%)	–	5	49
6 Nov	SF+DP	Channel 14	**33**	8	5	6	16	10	8	14	5	5	10	(2.2%)	(0.7%)	–	17	**62**
6 Nov	MM+SN	i24 News	**26**	12	(3.0%)	10	20	10	7	16	5	5	9	(2.8%)	(1.7%)	–	6	53
6 Nov	MM+SN	i24 News	23	8	–	9	12	9	7	8	5	4	8	–	–	**27**	4	48
6 Nov	Midgam R&C	HaHadashot 12	**25**	15	(2.9%)	8	20	10	8	13	5	5	11	(2.8%)	(1.3%)	–	5	51
30–31 Oct	LRI+P4A	Maariv	**23**	13	4	8	20	10	7	14	5	5	11	–	–	–	3	52
30–31 Oct	LRI+P4A	Maariv	19	10	–	7	15	10	7	8	5	5	10	–	–	**24**	5	43
28 Oct	Midgam R&C	HaHadashot 12	**26**	13	(2.9%)	8	22	10	8	13	5	5	10	(2.6%)	(1.0%)	–	4	52
28 Oct	Midgam R&C	HaHadashot 12	**24**	10	(2.8%)	7	13	10	8	8	5	5	9	(2.6%)	(0.8%)	21	3	49
27 Oct	SF+DP	Channel 14	**33**	9	5	6	14	10	8	14	5	5	11	(2.0%)	(1.0%)	–	19	**62**
22–23 Oct	LRI+P4A	Maariv	**25**	14	(2.2%)	8	21	10	7	15	5	5	10	(1.6%)	(1.9%)	–	4	50
19 Oct	MM+SN	Channel 13	**25**	13	5	8	21	10	7	13	4	5	9	–	–	–	4	55
18 Oct	LRI+P4A	Maariv	**23**	14	4	7	20	10	7	14	5	6	10	(1.2%)	(1.5%)	–	3	51
18 Oct	LRI+P4A	Maariv	18	11	4	7	13	10	7	9	5	5	8	–	–	**23**	5	46
15 Oct	SF+DP	Channel 14	**33**	8	4	7	15	10	8	15	5	5	10	(2.2%)	(0.7%)	–	18	**62**
9–10 Oct	LRI+P4A	Maariv	**24**	14	4	7	20	10	7	14	5	5	10	(1.8%)	(2.1%)	–	4	52
30 Sep	LRI+P4A	Maariv	**26**	14	4	7	19	10	7	14	5	5	9	(1.4%)	(1.2%)	–	7	54
30 Sep	LRI+P4A	Maariv	**23**	11	4	7	13	8	7	10	5	5	7	–	–	20	3	49
30 Sep	New Hope rejoins the government																	
29 Sep	SF+DP	Channel 14	**31**	9	5	6	15	11	8	15	5	5	10	(2.3%)	(0.6%)	–	16	**61**
29 Sep	Midgam R&C	HaHadashot 12	**25**	15	(2.0%)	6	21	10	8	14	5	5	11	(2.2%)	(2.4%)	–	4	49
29 Sep	Midgam R&C	HaHadashot 12	**23**	12	(2.0%)	5	13	10	8	9	5	5	10	(2.2%)	(0.4%)	20	3	46
26 Sep	SF+DP	Channel 14	**30**	9	5	7	15	10	8	15	6	4	11	(2.5%)	(0.4%)	–	15	60
25–26 Sep	LRI+P4A	Maariv	**25**	15	4	8	19	10	6	14	4	6	9	(2.2%)	(1.8%)	–	6	53
25–26 Sep	LRI+P4A	Maariv	20	12	4	8	12	9	7	10	4	6	7	–	–	**21**	1	48
19 Sep	SF+DP	Channel 14	**30**	10	5	6	17	10	8	13	5	5	11	(2.1%)	(0.2%)	–	13	59
18–19 Sep	LRI+P4A	Maariv	**24**	15	4	8	21	9	7	14	4	5	9	(1.8%)	(1.6%)	–	3	52
18–19 Sep	LRI+P4A	Maariv	20	11	4	8	13	8	7	11	4	5	8	–	–	**21**	1	47
16 Sep	MM+SN	Channel 13	21	13	5	9	**22**	10	7	14	6	5	8	–	–	–	1	52
11–12 Sep	LRI+P4A	Maariv	**24**	15	4	9	21	9	7	14	4	5	8	(1.7%)	(1.2%)	–	3	53
9 Sep	Midgam R&C	HaHadashot 12	**22**	15	(2.7%)	9	21	10	8	14	5	5	11	(2.4%)	(1.2%)	–	1	49
9 Sep	Midgam R&C	HaHadashot 12	**20**	11	(2.5%)	8	13	10	8	9	5	5	11	(2.4%)	(0.3%)	**20**	Tie	46
5 Sep	SF+DP	Channel 14	**29**	10	5	7	18	9	8	13	6	4	11	(2.2%)	(1.2%)	–	11	58
4–5 Sep	LRI+P4A	Maariv	**23**	13	4	9	22	9	7	15	4	6	8	(1.4%)	(1.3%)	–	1	52
4 Sep	Kantar	Kan 11	22	14	4	8	**23**	10	7	14	5	5	8	–	–	–	1	51
30 Aug	LRI+P4A	Maariv	**21**	14	4	9	**21**	9	8	15	4	6	9	(1.8%)	(1.9%)	–	Tie	51
30 Aug	LRI+P4A	Maariv	19	11	4	8	14	9	7	9	4	6	6	–	–	**23**	4	47
29 Aug	SF+DP	Channel 14	**30**	11	4	6	17	10	8	13	5	5	11	(2.4%)	(1.8%)	–	13	58
26–27 Aug	MM+SN	i24 News	**22**	11	5	8	21	9	8	14	5	6	11	(2.0%)	(1.0%)	–	1	52
26–27 Aug	MM+SN	i24 News	18	7	5	6	12	9	8	9	4	6	9	(1.0%)	(1.0%)	**27**	9	46
22 Aug	Midgam R&C	HaHadashot 12	**22**	15	(2.8%)	8	**22**	10	8	14	5	5	11	(2.5%)	(2.2%)	–	Tie	48
22 Aug	Midgam R&C	HaHadashot 12	19	11	(2.5%)	7	13	10	8	10	5	5	11	(2.5%)	(1.0%)	**21**	2	44
21–22 Aug	LRI+P4A	Maariv	**22**	15	4	10	20	9	7	14	5	5	9	(1.8%)	(1.9%)	–	2	52
16 Aug	LRI+P4A	Maariv	**22**	14	4	9	21	9	7	15	4	6	9	(1.7%)	(2.4%)	–	1	51
15 Aug	SF+DP	Channel 14	**28**	12	4	8	16	10	8	14	6	4	10	(2.7%)	(0.8%)	–	12	58
12 Aug	LRI+P4A	Maariv	23	12	4	10	**24**	9	7	14	4	5	8	(1.4%)	(2.9%)	–	1	53
12 Aug	LRI+P4A	Maariv	21	10	(1.9%)	9	15	9	7	11	4	5	7	(1.4%)	(1.7%)	**24**	3	46
8 Aug	SF+DP	Channel 14	**28**	13	5	7	16	10	8	14	6	4	9	(2.7%)	(0.7%)	–	12	58
7–8 Aug	LRI+P4A	Maariv	**22**	13	4	10	20	10	7	15	5	5	9	(2.0%)	(2.5%)	–	2	53
31 Jul	LRI+P4A	Maariv	21	13	4	10	**22**	10	7	15	5	5	8	(1.8%)	(1.6%)	–	1	52
26 Jul	LRI+P4A	Maariv	**23**	14	4	9	**23**	10	7	12	4	6	8	(2.2%)	(1.9%)	–	Tie	53
25 Jul	MM+SN	Channel 13	21	13	5	11	**23**	9	7	12	5	6	8	(2.9%)	(2.6%)	–	2	53
16–17 Jul	LRI+P4A	Maariv	21	13	4	10	**23**	9	7	14	4	6	9	(1.8%)	(2.3%)	–	2	51
12 Jul	Delegates from Labor and Meretz approve a merger and form The Democrats																	
10–11 Jul	LRI+P4A	Maariv	20	13	4	10	**24**	9	7	14	5	5	9	(1.4%)	(1.7%)	–	4	50
9 Jul	Timor Group	i24 News	21	15	–	10	**22**	11	8	14	6	5	8	–	–	–	1	50
7 Jul	MM+SN	Channel 13	21	13	4	10	**25**	10	8	12	4	4	9	(2.7%)	(2.2%)	–	4	53
4 Jul	SF+DP	Channel 14	**24**	13	6	9	17	10	8	13	6	4	10	(2.5%)	(0.9%)	–	7	57

Fieldwork date	Polling firm	Publisher	Likud	Yesh Atid	RZP	Otzma	National Unity	Shas	UTJ	Yisrael Beiteinu	Ra'am	Hadash –Ta'al	Labor	Meretz	Balad	New Hope	Lead	Gov.
28 Jun	LRI+P4A	Maariv	21	15	(2.4%)	9	**24**	10	7	14	5	5	6	4	(1.7%)	(1.8%)	3	47
25 Jun	SF+DP	Channel 14	**26**	13	6	8	17	10	8	14	6	4	8	(1.4%)	(2.4%)	(1.0%)	9	58
24 Jun	Midgam R&C	HaHadashot 12	20	15	(2.0%)	9	**23**	10	8	14	5	5	11		(2.6%)	(2.8%)	3	47
23 Jun	MM+SN	Channel 13	21	12	5	10	**25**	9	8	11	4	5	10		(2.9%)	(2.4%)	4	53
20 Jun	SF+DP	Channel 14	**24**	13	5	10	18	10	8	14	6	4	8	(2.1%)	(2.5%)	(1.3%)	6	57
19 Jun	LRI+P4A	Maariv	22	16	(2.7%)	9	**23**	10	7	14	5	5	5	4	(1.5%)	(2.4%)	1	48
13 Jun	LRI+P4A	Maariv	21	15	5	9	**24**	10	7	14	5	5	5	(1.9%)	(1.6%)	(2.7%)	3	52
10 Jun	Kantar	Kan 11	22	16	4	9	**23**	10	7	12	5	5	7	(1.8%)	(2.8%)	(1.4%)	1	52
10 Jun	Midgam R&C	HaHadashot 12	19	15	4	10	**22**	10	8	13	5	5	9		(2.6%)	(1.6%)	3	51
10 Jun	SF+DP	Channel 14	**26**	12	5	10	17	10	8	13	6	4	9	(1.2%)	(2.8%)	(2.9%)	9	59
10 Jun	MM+SN	Channel 13	20	13	5	9	**25**	10	7	12	5	5	9		(2.8%)	(2.6%)	5	51
9 Jun	National Unity leaves the government																	
5–6 Jun	Lazar	Maariv	20	15	4	10	**27**	10	7	11	5	5	6	(2.8%)	(1.6%)	(2.8%)	7	51
2 Jun	Kantar	Kan 11	21	14	4	9	**27**	10	7	12	5	5	6	–	–	–	6	51
30 May	SF+DP	Channel 14	**27**	12	4	9	19	10	8	13	6	4	8	(1.5%)	(2.4%)	(1.8%)	8	58
29–30 May	LRI+P4A	Maariv	22	14	4	10	**25**	10	7	10	4	5	5	4	(1.8%)	(2.3%)	3	53
29–30 May	LRI+P4A	Maariv	22	13	4	10	**25**	10	7	10	4	5	10		–	–	3	53
29 May	Midgam R&C	HaHadashot 12	21	13	5	9	**25**	10	7	10	5	5	10		(2.0%)	(2.5%)	4	52
28 May	Yair Golan is elected leader of the Labor Party																	
23 May	Kantar	Kan 11	22	16	4	9	**29**	10	7	10	4	5	(1.5%)	4	(2.9%)	(2.5%)	7	52
22–23 May	LRI+P4A	Maariv	20	14	(2.7%)	10	**29**	9	7	11	5	6	4	5	(1.8%)	(2.9%)	9	46
16 May	SF+DP	Channel 14	**25**	14	5	10	20	10	8	8	6	4	6	4	(2.6%)	(1.9%)	5	58
16 May	Midgam R&C	HaHadashot 12	19	16	4	9	**29**	10	8	11	5	5	(1.8%)	4	(2.5%)	(1.0%)	10	50
16 May	Midgam R&C	HaHadashot 12	19	14	4	9	**27**	10	8	11	5	5	8		–	–	10	50
15–16 May	LRI+P4A	Maariv	19	14	5	9	**30**	9	7	12	5	5	(2.3%)	5	(2%)	(2.4%)	11	49
10 May	LRI+P4A	Maariv	17	13	4	9	**32**	10	7	11	4	5	4	4	(1.7%)	(2.1%)	15	47
9 May	SF+DP	Channel 14	**25**	13	5	9	23	10	8	8	6	4	5	4	–	–	2	57
7 May	Midgam Project & Stat Net	Channel 13	19	15	6	12	**30**	10	7	10	6	5	(2.5%)	(2.1%)	(2.9%)	(1.5%)	11	54
1–2 May	LRI+P4A	Maariv	19	13	5	10	**31**	9	7	12	5	5	(1.9%)	4	(1.5%)	(1.6%)	12	50
30 Apr	Midgam R&C	HaHadashot 12	18	15	4	10	**31**	10	8	10	5	5	(2.2%)	4	(2.3%)	(2.2%)	13	50
30 Apr	Kantar	Kan 11	21	15	5	9	**29**	10	7	11	4	5	(2.1%)	4	(1.9%)	(2.5%)	8	52
26 Apr	LRI+P4A	Maariv	21	13	4	9	**29**	9	7	11	4	5	(2.6%)	4	(1.8%)	4	8	50
21 Apr	Midgam Project & Stat Net	Channel 13	20	15	7	9	**30**	8	7	11	4	5	4	–	–	–	10	51
17–18 Apr	LRI+P4A	Maariv	21	13	4	9	**31**	9	7	12	5	5	(2.1%)	4	(1.8%)	(2.0%)	10	50
14 Apr	SF+DP	Channel 14	**26**	11	5	9	22	10	8	11	6	4	4	4	(2.9%)	(1.5%)	4	58
10–11 Apr	LRI+P4A	Maariv	19	15	(2.7%)	10	**30**	9	7	12	5	5	(2.0%)	4	(1.4%)	4	11	45
7 Apr	SF+DP	Channel 14	22	11	5	10	**23**	10	8	8	6	4	4	5	–	4	1	55
7 Apr	Midgam R&C	HaHadashot 12	19	15	–	9	**32**	11	8	11	5	5	–	5	–	–	13	47
7 Apr	Kantar	Kan 11	21	14	(2.7%)	10	**30**	10	7	10	5	5	(2.4%)	4	(1.8%)	4	9	48
3 Apr	LRI+P4A	Maariv	17	15	4	9	**32**	9	6	11	4	5	(3.0%)	4	(1.4%)	4	15	45
31 Mar	SF+DP	Channel 14	**24**	13	6	10	22	10	8	8	6	4	5	4	(2.7%)	(3.0%)	2	58
28 Mar	Yair Lapid wins reelection as leader of Yesh Atid																	
27–28 Mar	LRI+P4A	Maariv	19	12	(2.9%)	10	**33**	10	7	10	5	5	(2.4%)	5	(2.0%)	4	14	46
25 Mar	New Hope leaves the government																	
20–21 Mar	LRI+P4A	Maariv	17	12	5	10	**35**	10	6	10	5	5	(1.9%)	5	(2.4%)	(2.7%)	18	48
13–14 Mar	LRI+P4A	Maariv	18	11	4	9	**36**	10	6	9	4	5	(1.8%)	4	(1.9%)	4	18	47
13 Mar	Kantar	Kan 11	21	14	(2.8%)	8	**30**	10	7	11	5	5	(1.8%)	4	(1.9%)	5	9	46
13 Mar	CF+MP+SN	Channel 13	17	14	4	9	**34**	9	7	8	4	4	–	4	–	6	17	46
13 Mar	Midgam R&C	HaHadashot 12	18	13	(2.9%)	8	**33**	11	7	11	5	5	(1.8%)	4	(1.7%)	5	15	44
13 Mar	SF+DP	Channel 14	**25**	12	4	9	22	10	8	9	6	4	(1.9%)	5	(2.8%)	6	3	56
13 Mar	New Hope splits from National Unity																	

Fieldwork date	Polling firm	Publisher	Likud	Yesh Atid	RZP	Otzma	National Unity	Shas	UTJ	Yisrael Beiteinu	Ra'am	Hadash –Ta'al	Labor	Meretz	Balad	Lead	Gov.
12 Mar	Midgam R&C	HaHadashot 12	19	14	(2.9%)	9	**35**	11	7	10	5	5	(1.7%)	5	(2.0%)	16	46
7 Mar	LRI+P4A	The Jerusalem Post	18	10	4	9	**41**	10	6	9	4	5	4	(2.9%)	(1.8%)	23	47
6–7 Mar	LRI+P4A	Maariv	18	10	4	9	**40**	10	6	9	5	5	(1.9%)	4	(1.8%)	22	47
3 Mar	CF+MP+SN	Channel 13	17	12	5	9	**39**	9	7	9	5	4	–	4	–	22	47
28–29 Feb	LRI+P4A	Maariv	18	12	(2.8%)	9	**41**	10	6	10	4	5	(2.5%)	5	(1.7%)	23	43
27 Feb	SF+DP	Channel 14	24	10	5	10	**27**	10	8	11	5	(3.1%)	(1.9%)	6	4	3	57
27 Feb	2024 Israeli municipal elections																
21–22 Feb	LRI+P4A	Maariv	18	13	(2.9%)	10	**39**	10	6	10	4	5	(1.6%)	5	(1.8%)	21	44
14–15 Feb	LRI+P4A	Maariv	18	12	(2.9%)	10	**40**	9	7	10	5	5	(1.0%)	4	(1.4%)	22	44
13 Feb	SF+DP	Channel 14	**28**	12	5	9	26	9	8	9	6	4	(2.3%)	4	(2.2%)	2	59
11 Feb	CF+MP+SN	Channel 13	18	13	6	8	**37**	9	7	10	4	4	–	4	–	19	48
11 Feb	Midgam R&C	HaHadashot 12	18	15	(2.3%)	9	**37**	11	7	9	5	5	(1.4%)	4	(1.3%)	19	45
7–8 Feb	LRI+P4A	Maariv	17	12	5	10	**36**	9	7	10	5	5	(1.4%)	4	(1.4%)	19	48
31 Jan – 1 Feb	LRI+P4A	Maariv	18	12	4	9	**38**	9	6	10	5	5	(1.2%)	4	(1.5%)	20	46
30 Jan	Midgam R&C	HaHadashot 12	18	14	4	8	**37**	10	7	8	5	5	(1.6%)	4	(2.3%)	19	47
24–25 Jan	LRI+P4A	Maariv	16	13	4	8	**40**	9	7	9	5	5	(1.4%)	4	(1.8%)	24	44
21 Jan	CF+MP+SN	Channel 13	16	14	6	8	**37**	9	7	9	5	5	–	4	–	21	46
17–18 Jan	LRI+P4A	Maariv	16	13	4	9	**39**	9	6	10	5	5	(1.4%)	4	(1.8%)	23	44
14 Jan	SF+DP	Channel 14	26	14	4	8	**29**	10	8	9	4	4	(2.0%)	4	(2.4%)	3	56
11 Jan	Midgam R&C	HaHadashot 12	18	14	4	8	**35**	11	7	9	5	5	(1.6%)	4	(2.0%)	17	48
10–11 Jan	LRI+P4A	Maariv	16	13	4	8	**39**	9	7	10	5	5	–	4	–	23	44
7 Jan	Kantar	Kan 11	20	14	4	8	**33**	10	7	10	5	5	(1.5%)	4	(1.2%)	13	49
6 Jan	SF+DP	Channel 14	25	14	5	9	**27**	9	8	10	5	4	(0.5%)	4	(1.8%)	2	56
3–4 Jan	LRI+P4A	Maariv	19	14	4	8	**36**	9	6	10	5	5	(1.2%)	4	(1.7%)	17	46
