= Opinion polling for the 2019 Israeli legislative election =

Opinion polling for the 2019 Israeli legislative election may refer to:

- Opinion polling for the April 2019 Israeli legislative election
- Opinion polling for the September 2019 Israeli legislative election
