= Ram Ben-Barak =

Israeli politician

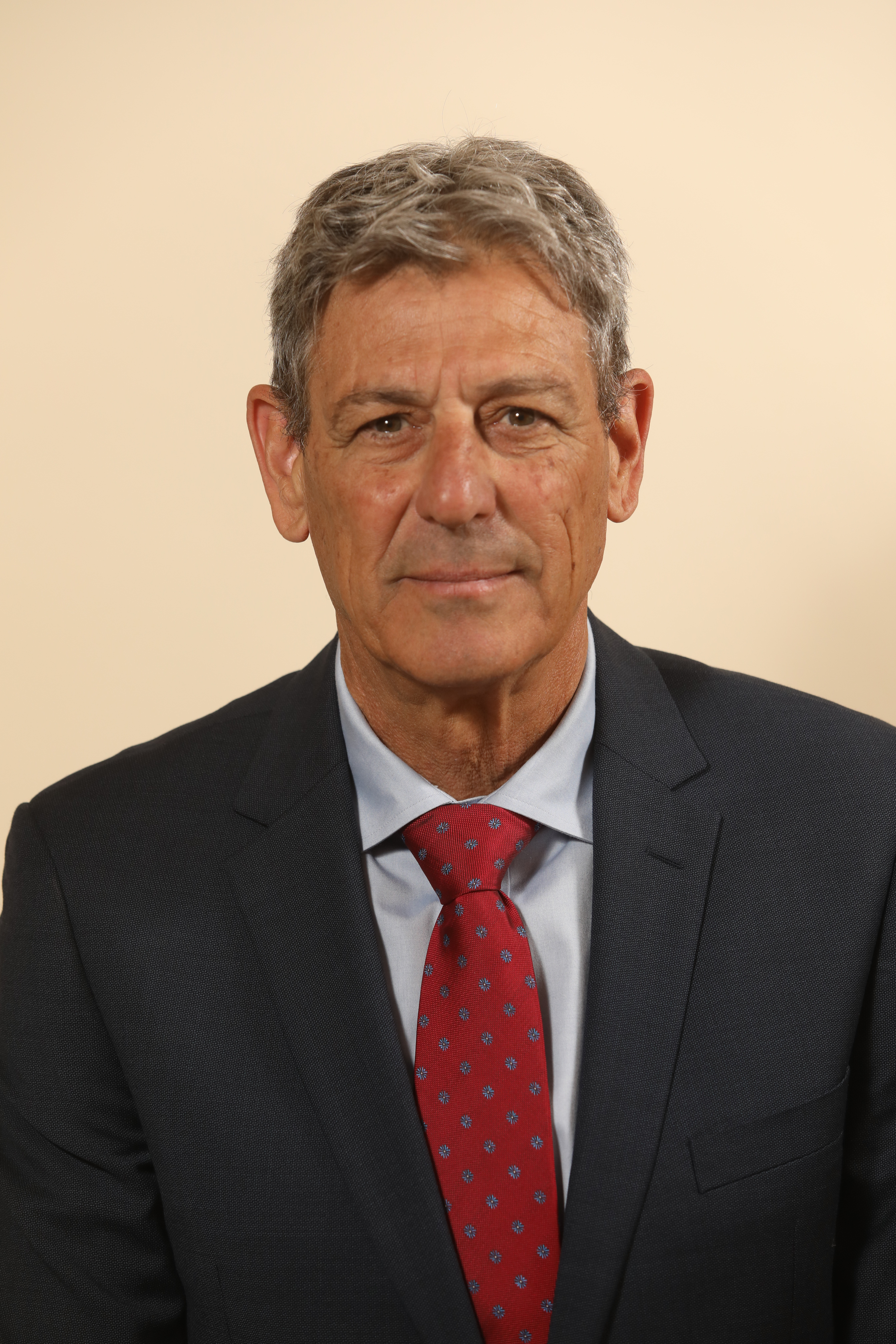
- Ben-Barak in February 2018

Faction represented in the Knesset
- 2019–2020: Blue and White
- 2020–2026: Yesh Atid
- 2026–: Together

Personal details
- Born: 1 April 1958 (age 68) Nahalal, Israel

Ram Ben-Barak (Hebrew: רָם בֶּן־בָּרָק; born 1 April 1958) is an Israeli politician who serves as a member of the Knesset for Together and was also a member of the Knesset for Yesh Atid from April 2019 until November 2026. He is also a former member of the Israeli security forces. He served as deputy director of the Mossad and director general of the Ministry of Intelligence Services and the Ministry of Strategic Affairs.

== Early life ==
Barak was born and raised in Nahalal, Israel, to a Jewish family. In 1976 he joined the IDF and served as a combat soldier and as an officer in the Sayeret Matkal commando unit. In his last position he served as commander of the Counter Terrorism Division until his release in 1981.

== Career ==
In 1984 he joined Mossad. In April 1991, he was arrested in Cyprus along with three other agents of the Mossad, posing as tourists during the operation to install listening devices at the Iranian embassy in Nicosia. They were convicted of trespassing, fined and returned to Israel. From 2009 to 2011 he served as deputy head of the Mossad. He was loaned to the IDF and served as coordinator of special operations.

He served as an advisor to the Israeli Embassy in Washington and a visiting research fellow at the Saban Center for Middle East Policy at the Brookings Institution.

On 15 January 2018, he announced he was joining the Yesh Atid party and became a member of the Knesset in April 2019.

In October 2023, Ben-Barak announced that he would run in Yesh Atid's first leadership primary election, challenging incumbent leader Yair Lapid; on 28 March 2024, however, Ben-Barak lost the election to Lapid by 308 votes to 279.

He was elected to the Knesset in 2026 after Together won 12 seats.

== Personal life ==
Ben-Barak studied at the National Defense College and political science at the University of Haifa, where he obtained an MA in government and national security. He is married with three children and lives in Nahalal.
