= 2024 Yesh Atid leadership election =

Yesh Atid leadership election

- 28 March 2024
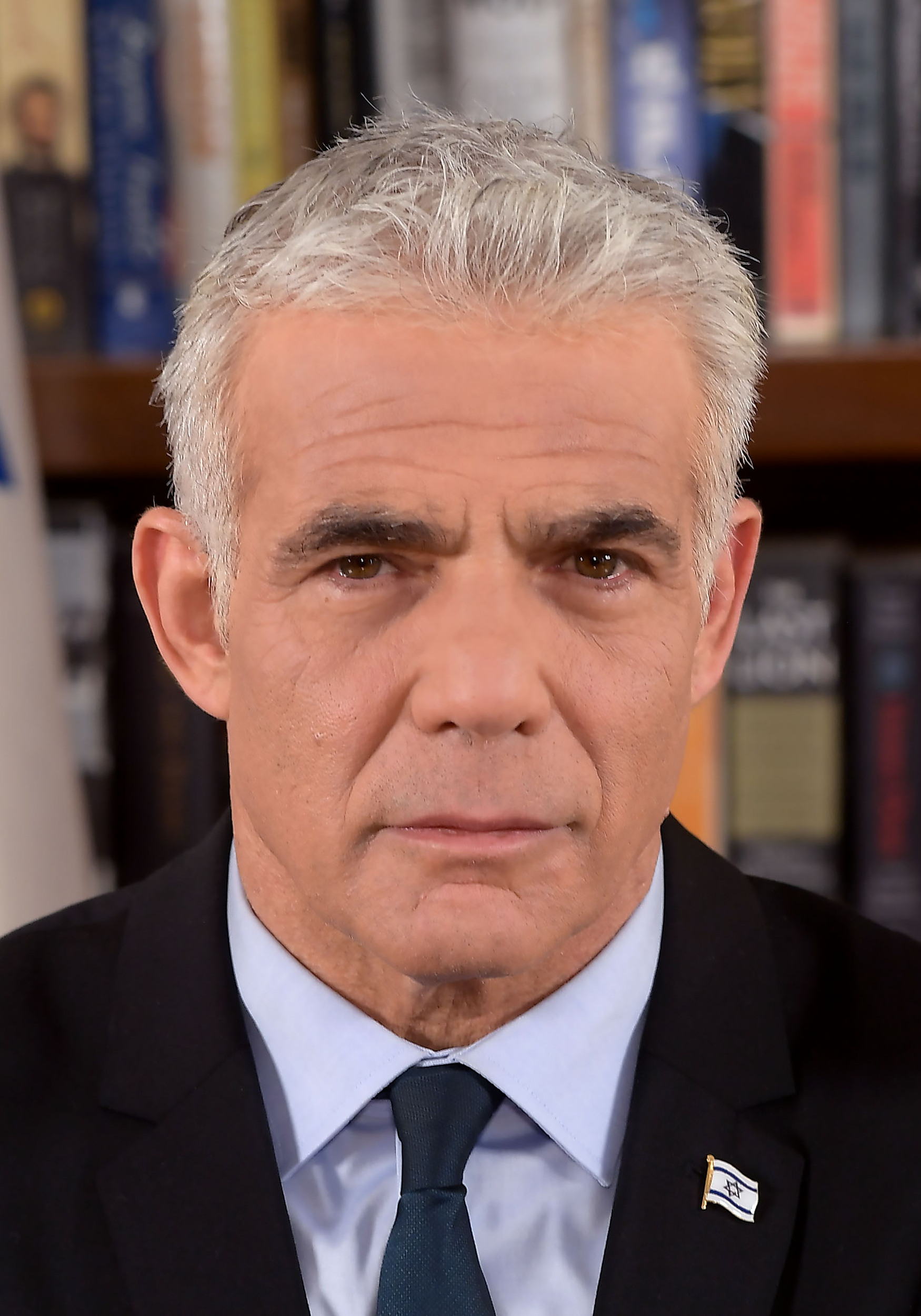

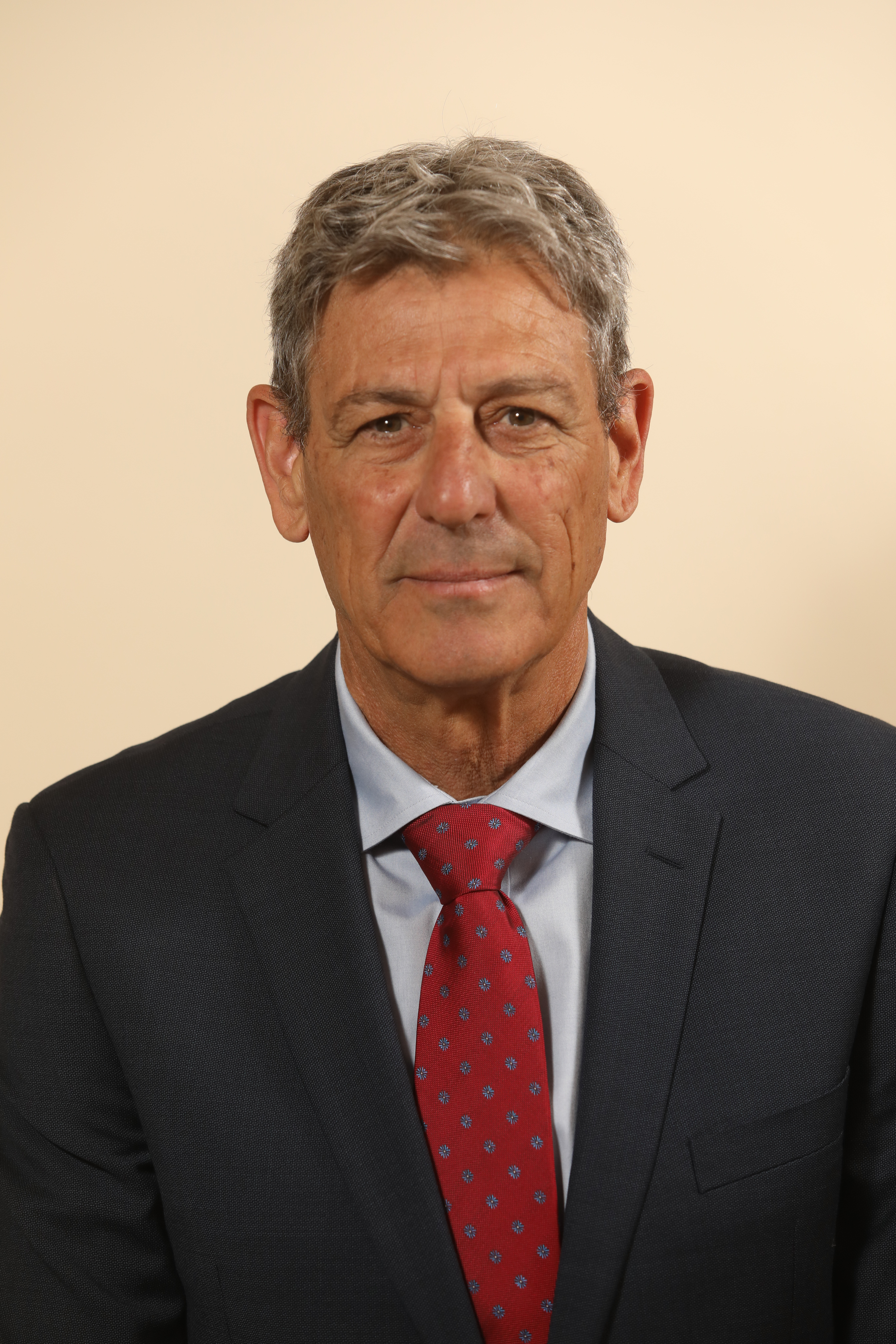
| Candidate | Yair Lapid | Ram Ben-Barak |
| Popular vote | 308 | 279 |
| Percentage | 52.5% | 47.5% |
Leader before election
Yair Lapid
Elected Leader
Yair Lapid

The 2024 Yesh Atid leadership election was held on 28 March 2024. Yair Lapid was elected as leader of Yesh Atid.

== Background ==
The first Yesh Atid leadership election was announced in 2022, though it was cancelled after Lapid was the only candidate.

In October 2023, Lapid announced that the party's first leadership primary would be held that coming December. It was postponed later that month due to the Gaza war.

The vote took place at the party's convention, and its electorate were the members of the party conference.

== Candidates ==
- Ram Ben-Barak, Member of the Knesset for Yesh Atid (endorsed by seven Yesh Atid MKs)
- Yair Lapid, leader of Yesh Atid (2012-present)

== Results ==
Lapid won the election and retained leadership of the party by 52.5% of the vote, beating Ben-Barak by 308 votes to 279, a margin of 29 votes.
