= Opinion polling for the April 2019 Israeli legislative election =

In the run-up to the April 2019 Israeli legislative election, which was held on 9 April, various organisations carried out opinion polling to gauge voting intentions in Israel. Results of such polls are displayed in this article, ranging from the previous legislative election, held on 17 March 2015, to the 2019 election.

== Campaign period ==
=== Electoral threshold ===
Polls do not take the electoral threshold (currently 3.25%) into account in a uniform fashion. Some polls reported the number of seats each party would win purely according to the percentages, as though there were no threshold; others eliminated parties that polled below the threshold and distributed the 120 available Knesset seats only among those who passed it. As a result, parties that polled at or near the threshold can show inconsistent results, bouncing between 0 and the minimum 3 or 4 seats. Polls may not add up to 120 seats due to rounding or omitted parties that drop out or do not poll consistently.

=== Graphs ===
These graphs show the polling trends from the time Knesset candidate lists were finalized on 21 February, until the day of the election. No polls were published from Friday before the election until the election date.

If more than one poll was conducted on the same day, the graphs show the average of the polls for that date.

==== Blocs ====
Legend

- Right-of-centre parties: all current government parties—Likud, Kulanu, (Note: Kulanu is a centre to centre-right party that expressed openness to serve in either a Likud- or Blue & White-led government.) Shas, United Torah Judaism (UTJ), Union of the Right-Wing Parties (URWP), and New Right—as well as Yisrael Beiteinu and Zehut. (Note: Zehut is a right-libertarian party that expressed openness to serve in either a Likud- or Blue & White-led government.)
- Centre and left-of-centre parties: Labor, Blue & White, (Note: Blue & White expressed its intention not to form a coalition with Ra'am-Balad or Hadash-Ta'al.) Ra'am-Balad, Hadash-Ta'al, Meretz, and Gesher. (Note: Gesher is a centrist party that expressed openness to serve in either a Likud- or Blue & White-led government.)

Note: Political blocs do not necessarily determine the exact makeup of post-election coalitions.

=== Polls ===
Poll results are listed in the table below in reverse chronological order, showing the most recent first. The highest figure in each survey is displayed in bold, and the background shaded in the leading party's colour. In the instance that there is a tie, then both figures are shaded. Parties that fall below the threshold are denoted by the percentage of votes that they received (N%) instead of the seats they would have gotten. When a poll has no information on a certain party, that party is instead marked by a dash (–).

These tables list the polls published from the time that Yisrael Beiteinu left the government coalition in mid-November 2018, until election day.

Legend

- **R** — sum of right-of-centre parties, including all current government parties—Likud, Kulanu, Shas, United Torah Judaism (UTJ), Union of the Right-Wing Parties (URWP), and New Right—as well as Yisrael Beiteinu and Zehut.
- **L** — sum of centre and left-of-centre parties, including: Labor, Blue & White, Ra'am-Balad, Hadash-Ta'al, Meretz, and Gesher.

Note: Political blocs do not necessarily determine the exact makeup of post-election coalitions.

Date	Polling firm	Likud	Labor	Blue & White	Kulanu	Ra'am –Balad	Shas	UTJ	URWP	Yisrael Beiteinu	Meretz	Hadash –Ta'al	New Right	Gesher	Zehut	L	R
	**Outgoing Knesset**	**29**	18	11	10	8	7	6	5	5	5	5	3	1	N/A	54	**66**
16 Apr	**Election results**	**35**	6	**35**	4	4	8	8	5	5	4	6	0	0	0	55	**65**
9 Apr	Channel 13 exit poll	**36**	7	**36**	4	–	7	7	4	4	4	7	4	–	–	54	**66**
9 Apr	Channel 11 exit poll	36	8	**37**	5	–	7	7	5	4	5	6	–	–	–	56	**64**
9 Apr	Channel 12 exit poll	33	6	**37**	4	6	6	7	5	5	5	6	–	–	–	**60**	**60**
5 Apr	**Election silence starting end of Friday before election day.**																
5 Apr	Panel Project HaMidgam/Statnet/Channel 13	**28**	11	**28**	4	4	5	6	7	4	5	6	6	(2.8%)	6	54	**66**
5 Apr	Smith/Maariv	27	9	**29**	5	4	6	7	6	4	5	7	6	(2.6%)	5	54	**66**
5 Apr	Maagar Mohot/Radio 103FM	28	9	**31**	6	–	6	7	7	–	7	7	6	–	6	54	**66**
4 Apr	Smith/Jerusalem Post	27	9	**28**	5	4	6	6	6	5	5	6	5	4	4	56	**64**
4 Apr	Midgam/Yedioth Ahronoth	26	11	**30**	5	4	5	7	5	4	5	7	6	(2.2%)	5	57	**63**
4 Apr	Maagar Mohot/Israel Hayom & i24 News	27	10	**32**	6	(2%)	5	8	6	(2%)	8	6	6	(2%)	6	56	**64**
4 Apr	TNS/Kan	**31**	8	30	5	4	4	6	6	(2.4%)	6	8	6	(2.9%)	6	56	**64**
4 Apr	Midgam/iPanel/Channel 12	26	10	**30**	5	4	5	7	5	5	5	7	6	(2.6%)	5	56	**64**
4 Apr	Miskar	**31**	10	28	(3.18%)	4	6	6	8	(1.2%)	5	7	7	(2%)	8	54	**66**
3 Apr	Panels Politics/Walla!	29	10	**30**	(2.9%)	4	5	6	7	4	6	8	6	(2.1%)	5	58	**62**
2-3 Apr	Dialog/Haaretz	**30**	10	27	5	4	5	6	7	4	5	7	5	(2.8%)	5	53	**67**
2 Apr	Panel Project HaMidgam/Statnet/Channel 13	**29**	14	28	4	5	5	6	7	(2.2%)	5	6	5	(2.9%)	6	58	**62**
31 Mar	Panels Politics/Channel 12	**31**	9	30	4	(2.1%)	5	6	5	4	6	9	6	(2.2%)	5	54	**66**
31 Mar	Midgam/iPanel/Channel 12	28	8	**32**	5	4	6	6	5	4	5	7	5	(1.6%)	5	56	**64**
29 Mar	Maagar Mohot/Radio 103 FM	29	8	**31**	5	–	6	7	7	4	5	7	6	–	5	51	**69**
28 Mar	Midgam/Yedioth Ahronoth	27	9	**31**	5	4	5	7	5	4	5	7	6	(2.7%)	5	56	**64**
28 Mar	Maagar Mohot/Israel Hayom & i24 News	28	8	**32**	5	(2%)	6	6	6	5	6	6	6	(1%)	6	52	**68**
28 Mar	Smith/Maariv	29	8	**30**	4	4	6	6	6	4	5	7	7	(3%)	4	54	**66**
28 Mar	Panel Project HaMidgam/Statnet/Channel 13	**30**	10	**30**	4	4	4	7	7	(2.2%)	5	7	5	(2.3%)	7	56	**64**
28 Mar	Direct Polls/Makor Rishon	**30**	9	29	4	4	6	6	7	(2.3%)	6	8	7	(1.5%)	4	56	**64**
27 Mar	Panels Politics/Walla!	**31**	9	30	4	(1.9%)	4	7	7	4	5	8	6	(2.6%)	5	52	**68**
26 Mar	Midgam/Army Radio	28	10	**30**	4	(1.6%)	6	7	5	4	5	8	5	4	4	57	**63**
26 Mar	TNS/Kan	28	8	**30**	6	5	6	7	5	(2.1%)	5	7	7	(2.6%)	6	55	**65**
24-26 Mar	Miskar	**31**	7	30	(3.1%)	4	6	6	9	(2.4%)	5	8	7	(2.6%)	7	54	**66**
24 Mar	Midgam/Channel 12	28	10	**32**	(2.6%)	4	6	7	5	4	4	7	5	4	4	**61**	59
24 Mar	Panel Project HaMidgam/Statnet/Channel 13	28	10	**31**	5	4	5	6	8	(2.4%)	5	7	5	(1.6%)	6	57	**63**
22 Mar	Panels Politics/Maariv	**31**	9	30	4	–	4	7	6	5	6	9	5	–	4	54	**66**
22 Mar	Maagar Mochot/Israel Hayom & i24 News	26	9	**30**	4	4	4	6	7	4	6	5	5	4	6	58	**62**
22 Mar	Smith/Jerusalem Post	27	8	**30**	5	4	6	7	6	4	5	8	6	(2.8%)	4	55	**65**
20 Mar	Midgam/iPanel/Channel 12	27	10	**32**	4	4	5	7	5	4	4	8	6	(1.6%)	4	58	**62**
20 Mar	Panel Project HaMidgam/Channel 13	29	9	**31**	5	4	5	7	7	(2.2%)	5	7	6	(2.3%)	5	56	**64**
19 Mar	Panels Politics/Walla!	**32**	8	29	4	(2.5%)	4	6	7	5	6	9	6	(2.9%)	4	52	**68**
16-18 Mar	Miskar	**31**	8	29	(2.3%)	5	6	6	9	(1.4%)	5	7	8	(2.3%)	6	54	**66**
17 Mar	Direct Polls/Kan	**31**	9	30	(2.1%)	4	6	6	6	4	6	8	6	(1.1%)	4	57	**63**
14 Mar	Maagar Mochot/Israel Hayom & i24 News	26	7	**33**	5	(2%)	5	7	7	5	8	6	6	(2%)	5	54	**66**
14 Mar	Midgam/iPanel/Channel 12	28	10	**31**	4	4	6	7	7	4	4	7	4	(2.3%)	4	56	**64**
13 Mar	Direct Polls/Makor Rishon	**32**	10	**32**	(2.7%)	(2.6%)	6	7	7	(2.9%)	6	9	7	(1.7%)	4	57	**63**
11 Mar	Panel HaMidgam Project/Statnet/Channel 13	28	7	**31**	4	5	5	6	7	4	6	7	6	(2.3%)	4	56	**64**
8 Mar	Maagar Mohot/Radio 103FM	29	8	**35**	5	–	6	8	7	–	7	9	6	–	–	59	**61**
7-8 Mar	Midgam/iPanel/Yediot Ahronot	29	10	**33**	4	4	6	7	6	4	5	7	5	(2%)	(3.1%)	59	**61**
7 Mar	Dialog/Haaretz	28	10	**31**	4	4	5	7	8	(2%)	4	8	7	(1.8%)	4	57	**63**
7 Mar	Maagar Mochot/Israel Hayom & i24 News	26	8	**33**	4	(2%)	4	8	8	(1%)	8	9	8	(2%)	4	58	**62**
5 Mar	TNS/Kan	30	7	**35**	5	4	5	7	5	(2%)	5	8	5	(2%)	4	59	**61**
5 Mar	Smith/Channel 20	29	7	**31**	4	4	5	6	6	4	5	9	6	4	(3%)	**60**	**60**
5 Mar	Midgam/Channel 12	30	9	**36**	5	4	6	7	6	(2.7%)	4	8	5	(2.2%)	(2.0%)	**61**	59
5 Mar	Panels Politics/Walla! News	31	8	**36**	6	(1.6%)	4	7	7	(2.8%)	6	9	6	(2.7%)	(2.6%)	59	**61**
3 Mar	Panels Politics/Channel 12	30	8	**38**	5	(2.2%)	4	7	7	(2.1%)	6	9	6	(2.8%)	(2.9%)	**61**	59
1-3 Mar	Miskar (Note: Results of this poll are before redistribution of surplus votes, therefore total seats are less than 120.)	**28**	5	27	(2.3%)	5	4	5	11	(1.3%)	4	7	7	(1.4%)	7	48	**62**
1 Mar	Panel HaMidgam Project/Statnet/Channel 13	30	6	**36**	4	4	6	7	7	(2.3%)	6	9	5	(2.3%)	(1.6%)	**61**	59
1 Mar	TNS/Kan	29	6	**37**	5	5	6	7	5	(2%)	6	7	7	(3%)	(3%)	**61**	59
1 Mar	Maagar Mohot/Radio 103FM & Maariv	25	7	**37**	5	–	6	6	10	–	6	7	8	–	–	57	**60**
28 Feb	Panels Politics/Maariv	29	6	**35**	5	(1.5%)	5	7	7	4	5	11	6	(3.0%)	(2.9%)	57	**63**
28 Feb	Maagar Mochot/Israel Hayom & i24 News	29	7	**38**	4	(1%)	6	6	9	(2%)	6	7	8	(2%)	(3%)	58	**62**
27 Feb	Number 10 Strategies/The Times of Israel	29	8	**36**	4	4	4	7	5	4	4	7	8	(1%)	–	59	**61**
24 Feb	Maagar Mochot/Israel Hayom & i24 News	31	8	**36**	(2%)	(2%)	7	7	8	(3%)	7	7	9	(2%)	(2%)	58	**62**
24 Feb	Midgam/iPanel/Yediot Ahronot	29	9	**35**	4	5	5	7	5	4	4	7	6	(3%)	(3.1%)	**60**	**60**
22 Feb	Maagar Mochot/Radio 103 FM	27	6	**34**	4	8	4	6	7	4	5	6	6	–	–	**62**	58
21 Feb	Panels Politics/Maariv	29	7	**35**	4	5	5	7	6	4	4	6	8	(2.4%)	(2.8%)	57	**63**
21 Feb	Midgam/Yediot Ahronot	30	8	**36**	4	6	5	6	5	4	4	6	6	(2.7%)	(2.4%)	**60**	**60**
21 Feb	Direct polls/Makor Rishon	32	7	**35**	(2.3%)	(1.2%)	5	7	6	5	4	11	8	(2%)	(1.6%)	57	**63**
21 Feb	Direct polls/Kan	32	8	**35**	(1.9%)	(2.1%)	6	6	6	5	4	11	7	(2.4%)	(2.1%)	58	**62**
21 Feb	Midgam/Channel 12	30	8	**36**	4	6	5	7	4	4	4	6	6	(3.1%)	(2%)	**60**	**60**
21 Feb	Panel HaMidgam Project/Statnet/Channel 13	26	5	**36**	4	4	6	7	8	5	4	10	5	–	–	59	**61**
21 Feb	**Deadline for party lists to be submitted**																
21 Feb	**The Joint List splits up. Hadash joins Ta'al as Balad runs with Ra'am.**																
21 Feb	**Yesh Atid and Hosen L'Yisrael reach agreement to run as one list called Blue & White**																
20 Feb	**The Jewish Home, Tkuma and Otzma Yehudit reach agreement to run as one list called URWP**																

Date	Polling firm	Likud	Labor	Joint List	Yesh Atid	Kulanu	Shas	UTJ	Hatnuah	Jewish Home	Yisrael Beiteinu	Meretz	New Right	Ta'al	Gesher	Zehut	Hosen- Telem	L	R
	**Current seats**	30	18	12	11	**10**	**7**	**6**	6	**5**	5	5	**3**	1	1	N/A	N/A	54	**66**
20 Feb	Panels Politics/Walla! News	31	9	5	13	4	4	7	—N/a	5	–	5	8	6	4	–	19	**61**	59
18 Feb	**Hatnuah announces withdrawal**																		
17 Feb	Channel 13	32	5	7	10	4	4	6	–	5	4	4	9	6	–	–	24	56	**64**
17 Feb	Midgam/Channel 12	30	10	5	12	5	6	7	–	4	4	5	7	7	–	–	18	57	**63**
16 Feb	Direct Polls/Kan	30	10	6	10	4	5	6	–	5	5	5	8	6	–	–	20	57	**63**
15 Feb	Maagar Mochot/Radio 103 FM	30	8	7	11	–	5	7	–	–	–	6	8	5	–	–	20	59	**61**
14 Feb	**Meretz holds its primaries**																		
14 Feb	Maagar Mochot/i24 News/Israel Hayom	32	8	9	12	–	4	9	–	–	–	7	6	5	4	5	19	**64**	56
13 Feb	Direct Polls/Kan	30	11	6	11	4	5	7	–	–	6	4	10	6	–	–	20	58	**62**
12 Feb	Midgam/Labor	30	9	5	11	6	6	7	–	–	4	5	7	7	4	–	19	**60**	**60**
12 Feb	Panel Project HaMidgam/Channel 13	32	8	6	11	5	6	7	–	–	4	5	8	7	–	–	21	58	**62**
11 Feb	**Labor holds its primaries**																		
9 Feb	Miskar/Srugim	30	–	4	9	–	–	6	–	6	–	–	7	5	–	–	20	38	**49**
8 Feb	Direct Polls/Makor Rishon	32	7	5	11	–	6	7	–	4	5	5	8	7	–	–	23	58	**62**
7 Feb	Midgam/Channel 12	32	7	5	11	5	6	7	–	–	5	5	8	7	–	–	22	57	**63**
7 Feb	Panel Project HaMidgam/Channel 13	32	5	7	10	4	5	5	–	5	4	4	9	6	–	–	24	56	**64**
7 Feb	Panels Politics/Walla! News	34	5	7	13	5	4	7	–	6	–	5	6	6	–	–	22	58	**62**
6–7 Feb	Maagar Mochot/Israel Hayom & i24 News	35	5	11	14	–	6	9	–	–	–	7	7	–	5	–	21	**63**	57
6 Feb	Smith/Channel 20	30	5	6	12	5	5	6	–	–	5	6	8	6	4	–	22	**61**	59
6 Feb	Direct Polls/Kan	32	6	6	11	4	5	6	–	5	5	4	7	7	–	–	22	56	**64**
5 Feb	**Likud holds its primaries**																		
3–4 Feb	Dialog/Haaretz	30	5	7	9	5	5	6	–	6	5	4	7	5	4	–	22	56	**64**
3 Feb	**The Jewish Home chooses Rabbi Rafi Peretz as its leader**																		
1 Feb	Panels Politics/Maariv	31	6	5	12	5	4	7	–	4	5	5	6	6	4	–	20	58	**62**
31 Jan	Maagar Mochot/i24News/Israel Hayom	28	5	9	9	5	4	7	–	–	–	4	7	–	4	4	19	50	**55**
30 Jan	Panel Project HaMidgam/Channel 13	30	6	6	9	4	5	6	–	4	4	4	6	8	4	–	24	**61**	59
30 Jan	Midgam/Channel 12	30	6	6	11	5	5	7	–	4	4	4	7	6	4	–	21	58	**62**
30 Jan	Direct Polls/Kan	31	8	6	9	4	4	6	–	4	5	6	8	6	–	–	23	58	**62**
30 Jan	Panels Politics/Walla! News	29	7	7	12	5	4	7	–	4	5	5	7	5	4	–	19	59	**61**
29 Jan	**Moshe Feiglin's Zehut party holds Israel's first open primaries**																		
29 Jan	**Hosen L'Yisrael announces they will run a joint list with Moshe Ya'alon's Telem party**																		
24 Jan	Direct Polls/Reshet Bet	31	9	6	11	4	5	6	–	4	5	6	8	6	4	–	15	57	**63**
22 Jan	Midgam/Army Radio	29	9	6	13	5	6	7	–	4	5	5	7	6	5	–	13	57	**63**
17 Jan	Teleseker/Saloona	28	8	12	13	5	5	7	–	4	4	5	9	—N/a	5	–	15	58	**62**
17 Jan	Panels Politics/Walla!	33	8	10	15	5	4	7	–	4	4	5	9	—N/a	4	–	12	54	**66**
16 Jan	TNS/Kan	31	7	12	10	6	5	6	4	4	4	5	7	—N/a	6	—N/a	13	57	**63**
16 Jan	Midgam/Channel 12	32	9	6	14	4	6	7	–	–	6	5	8	6	4	–	13	57	**63**
8 Jan	**Ta'al withdraws from the Joint List**																		

Date	Polling firm	Likud	Labor	Joint List	Yesh Atid	Kulanu	Shas	UTJ	Hatnuah	Jewish Home	Yisrael Beiteinu	Meretz	New Right	Gesher	Hosen	L	R
8 Jan	Panels Politics/Walla! News	32	8	12	13	5	5	7	–	5	4	5	8	4	12	54	**66**
5 Jan	Shvakim Panorama/Israel Beitenu	26	8	12	10	5	7	7	4	4	8	6	6	4	13	57	**63**
4 Jan	Maagar Mochot/Radio 103 FM	29	7	10	13	6	4	7	4	–	5	6	8	5	12	57	**59**
4 Jan	Direct Polls/Makor Rishon	26	10	12	17	4	5	6	–	5	4	5	10	4	12	**60**	**60**
4 Jan	Panels Politics/Maariv	30	8	13	12	5	5	7	–	4	4	5	11	4	12	54	**66**
3 Jan	Smith/Jerusalem Post	30	9	12	11	6	6	7	–	–	5	6	9	5	14	57	**63**
3 Jan	Maagar Mochot/Israel Hayom	28	7	9	13	6	–	6	4	4	4	6	8	5	13	**57**	56
2 Jan	TNS/Kan	28	7	12	13	7	6	7	–	–	5	6	9	6	14	58	**62**
2 Jan	Midgam/iPanel/News Company	31	8	12	10	5	5	7	5	4	5	5	6	5	12	57	**63**
1 Jan	**Labor splits the Zionist Union alliance with Hatnuah**																

Date	Polling firm	Likud	Zionist Union	Joint List	Yesh Atid	Kulanu	Shas	UTJ	Jewish Home	Yisrael Beiteinu	Meretz	New Right	Gesher	Hosen	L	R
30 Dec	Sarid/Kan	27	9	12	16	7	4	7	–	–	6	14	5	13	**61**	59
30 Dec	Panel Project HaMidgam/Channel 10	30	8	13	11	6	5	7	3	5	5	8	5	14	56	**64**
30 Dec	Midgam/Channel 13	28	9	12	12	6	6	7	4	5	6	6	5	14	58	**62**
30 Dec	Panels Politics/Walla!	28	9	13	15	5	4	7	4	4	6	10	4	11	58	**62**
30 Dec	Direct Polls/Makor Rishon	25	9	12	10	4	5	7	5	5	5	14	4	15	55	**65**
29 Dec	**Ayelet Shaked and Naftali Bennett break away from The Jewish Home to create a new party, the New Right**															
27 Dec	**Former IDF General Chief of Staff Benny Gantz registers a new party, Hosen L'Yisrael**															
27 Dec	Maagar Mochot/Israel Hayom	31	7	12	11	5	4	7	11	4	5	—N/a	6	15	56	**62**
27 Dec	Panels Politics/Channel 12	31	9	11	15	5	4	7	11	4	5	—N/a	5	13	58	**62**
26 Dec	**The government is dissolved**															
25 Dec	Midgam/News Company	29	11	12	11	5	5	7	9	6	5	—N/a	4	16	59	**61**
25 Dec	Sarid/Kan	30	10	13	13	6	4	7	12	4	7	—N/a	4	10	57	**63**
25 Dec	Panel HaMidgam Project/Statnet/Ten News	30	12	12	15	6	6	7	10	7	7	—N/a	8	—N/a	54	**66**
25 Dec	Panel HaMidgam Project/Statnet/Ten News	27	9	12	12	6	5	7	9	6	6	—N/a	6	15	**60**	**60**
25 Dec	Panels Politics/Walla!	32	11	11	17	6	4	8	12	6	8	—N/a	5	—N/a	52	**68**
25 Dec	Panels Politics/Walla!	31	9	11	12	5	4	7	11	5	6	—N/a	5	14	57	**63**
24–25 Dec	Panels Politics/Maariv	30	9	11	12	6	4	7	11	5	6	—N/a	6	13	57	**63**
24 Dec	**Prime Minister Netanyahu calls the election for 9 April 2019**															
16 Dec	Midgam/Channel 13	28	10	12	13	5	5	7	9	6	4	—N/a	5	16	**60**	**60**
21 Nov	Panels Politics/Walla!	30	12	13	17	6	4	8	13	6	6	—N/a	5	—N/a	53	**67**
21 Nov	Panels Politics/Walla!	30	9	13	10	5	4	8	12	4	6	—N/a	–	19	57	**63**
20 Nov	Midgam/Army Radio	30	12	12	18	8	6	7	9	8	4	—N/a	6	—N/a	52	**68**
19 Nov	Panel HaMidgam Project/Statnet/Ten News	29	14	14	17	5	4	6	9	8	7	—N/a	7	—N/a	59	**61**
19 Nov	Panel HaMidgam Project/Statnet/Ten News	27	10	14	12	4	4	6	9	8	6	—N/a	5	15	**62**	58
17 Nov	Midgam/News Company	30	12	12	18	8	7	6	10	6	5	—N/a	6	—N/a	53	**67**
14–15 Nov	Smith/Channel 20	29	11	12	16	8	5	8	11	8	6	—N/a	6	—N/a	51	**69**
14 Nov	Panels Politics/Maariv	30	11	11	17	7	5	8	12	7	6	—N/a	6	—N/a	51	**69**
14 Nov	Midgam/News Company	29	11	12	18	8	6	7	11	7	6	—N/a	5	—N/a	52	**68**
14 Nov	Midgam/News Company	24	8	12	13	8	6	7	10	7	5	—N/a	5	15	58	**62**
14 Nov	**Yisrael Beiteinu leaves the coalition government, down to just 61 MKs in support**															

==== Student polls ====
This table lists polls answered by Israeli college and university students.

Date	Polling firm	Likud	Labor	Blue & White	Kulanu	Ra'am –Balad	Shas	UTJ	URWP	Yisrael Beiteinu	Meretz	Hadash –Ta'al	New Right	Gesher	Zehut	L	R
	**Current seats**	**29**	18	11	10	8	7	6	5	5	5	5	3	1	N/A	54	**66**
31 Mar 2019	Panels/National Union of Students	13	14	**47**	–	–	(1.9%)	(2.8%)	7	–	15	(2.0%)	7	(1.1%)	17	**76**	44

== 20th Knesset ==
This table lists the polls published from the beginning of the 20th Knesset to the time that Yisrael Beiteinu left the government coalition in mid-November 2018.

Legend

- C — sum of 2015 government coalition parties, including: Likud, Kulanu, The Jewish Home, Shas, United Torah Judaism, and Yisrael Beiteinu (joined in 2016).
- O — sum of opposition parties, including: Zionist Union (Labor Party and Hatnuah), Yesh Atid, Joint List and Meretz, as well as independent MK Orly Levy who resigned from Yisrael Beiteinu in 2016.

Date	Polling firm	Likud	Zionist Union	Joint List	Yesh Atid	Kulanu	Jewish Home	Shas	UTJ	Yisrael Beiteinu	Meretz	Orly Levy	C	O
25 Oct 2018	Panel HaMidgam Project/Statnet/Ten News	30	12	14	19	7	10	4	6	5	8	5	62	58
11 Oct 2018	Panel HaMidgam Project/Statnet/Ten News	31	11	13	15	6	12	5	8	6	7	6	68	52
7 Oct 2018	Midgam/News Company	32	12	12	18	6	10	5	7	5	6	6	65	54
2–3 Sep 2018	Panels Politics/Keshet	36	11	11	18	6	11	4	7	6	5	5	70	50
21 Aug 2018	Panels Politics/Walla News	33	12	11	20	6	11	4	7	6	5	5	67	53
30 Jul 2018	Panels Politics/Walla News	33	12	11	19	6	10	4	8	6	5	6	67	53
24 Jul 2018	Midgam/News Company	30	15	12	19	7	8	5	7	7	5	5	64	56
12 Jul 2018	Maagar Mochot/Makor Rishon	33	11	11	20	7	10	4	7	6	5	6	67	53
8 Jul 2018	Panels Politics/Walla News	35	11	12	17	6	10	4	8	5	7	5	68	52
4 Jul 2018	Midgam/Yediot Ahronot	33	15	12	18	6	7	5	7	6	6	5	64	56
25 Jun 2018	Midgam/News Company	32	15	12	18	7	7	6	7	6	5	5	65	55
8 Jun 2018	Panel HaMidgam Project/Statnet/Ten News	31	13	12	18	6	11	5	6	6	7	5	65	55
3 Jun 2018	Panels Politics/Walla News	34	10	12	16	6	11	5	8	6	6	6	70	50
1 Jun 2018	Smith/Maariv	34	11	12	17	7	9	5	6	8	6	5	69	51
9 May 2018	Panels/Maariv	36	10	12	17	7	9	4	7	6	6	6	69	51
9 May 2018	Geocartography (Note: Survey partially released by Army Radio.)	42	10	?	18	?	8	5	9	?	?	?	64	?
9 May 2018	Midgam/News Company	35	14	12	18	6	8	4	7	6	5	5	66	54
1 May 2018	Smith/Channel 20	32	12	12	19	7	10	4	7	6	7	4	66	54
29 Apr 2018	Panels Politics/Walla News	29	11	12	19	7	12	5	8	6	7	4	67	53
26 Apr 2018	Geocartography/Israel Hayom	34	9	11	20	6	9	4	9	4	7	7	66	54
23 Apr 2018	Midgam/News Company	28	14	12	20	6	10	4	7	5	6	8	60	60
15 Apr 2018	Panel Politics/Knesset Channel	29	10	11	20	9	12	5	7	5	7	5	67	53
3 Apr 2018	Panel HaMidgam Project/Statnet/Ten News	32	12	13	21	7	10	4	5	5	7	4	63	57
29 Mar 2018	Smith/Channel 20	30	13	12	19	7	10	5	7	5	7	5	64	56
22 Mar 2018	Meretz leadership primary concludes with Tamar Zandberg's victory													
16 Mar 2018	Geocartography/Israel Hayom	39	10	10	20	5	8	–	9	5	7	7	66	54
12 Mar 2018	Panel HaMidgam Project/Statnet/Ten News	29	11	13	24	6	11	5	6	6	9	—N/a	63	57
12 Mar 2018	Midgam/News Company	30	13	12	21	6	11	4	7	4	7	5	62	58
11 Mar 2018	Former defense minister Moshe Ya'alon announces his intention to form a new party and run in the next election													
8 Mar 2018	Panels Politics/Walla News	30	11	10	24	7	11	4	8	7	8	—N/a	67	53
8 Mar 2018	Maagar Mochot/Israel Hayom	34	10	10	24	6	14	2	8	5	7	—N/a	69	51
6 Mar 2018	Independent MK Orly Levy announces her intention to form a new party and run in the next election													
4 Mar 2018	Panel HaMidgam Project/Statnet/Ten News	29	12	12	24	7	10	5	6	7	8	—N/a	64	56
1 Mar 2018	Panels Politics/Walla News	29	13	10	23	8	11	4	8	6	8	—N/a	66	54
28 Feb 2018	Geocartography/Israel Hayom	36	10	10	23	5	11	4	10	5	6	—N/a	71	49
21–22 Feb 2018	Midgam/News Company	28	15	12	24	7	9	5	7	7	6	—N/a	63	57
21 Feb 2018	Panel HaMidgam Project/Statnet/Ten News	27	15	12	23	8	10	5	6	7	7	—N/a	63	57
19 Feb 2018	Geocartography/Israel Hayom	34	12	12	20	7	14	–	9	6	6	—N/a	70	50
14 Feb 2018	Smith/Maariv	28	15	12	22	7	11	5	7	7	6	—N/a	65	55
14 Feb 2018	Panel HaMidgam Project/Ten News	27	16	11	25	5	11	5	7	6	7	—N/a	61	59
14 Feb 2018	Midgam/News Company	26	15	12	22	9	11	5	7	6	7	—N/a	64	56
1 Feb 2018	Geocartography	30	13	8	24	7	12	5	7	8	6	—N/a	69	51
21 Jan 2018	Panels Politics/Walla News	24	15	11	25	8	13	4	8	5	7	—N/a	62	58
12 Jan 2018	Panels Politics/Maariv	22	14	11	27	9	13	4	8	5	7	—N/a	61	59
10–11 Jan 2018	Midgam/News Company	25	16	12	24	7	11	6	7	7	5	—N/a	63	57
28 Dec 2017	Geocartography	31	13	9	26	8	12	4	7	4	6	—N/a	66	54
25–27 Dec 2017	Maagar Mochot/Makor Rishon	24	12	11	25	11	14	4	7	5	7	—N/a	65	55
18–19 Dec 2017	Geocartography	24	14	9	27	7	20	–	9	5	5	—N/a	65	55
8 Dec 2017	Geocartography	33	12	13	16	7	14	6	9	6	4	—N/a	75	45
4 Dec 2017	News Company	24	18	12	22	6	12	5	7	7	7	—N/a	61	59
1 Dec 2017	Panels Politics/Maariv	25	17	11	25	7	12	4	8	5	6	—N/a	61	59
26 Nov 2017	Ten News	24	17	11	24	9	12	4	7	5	7	—N/a	61	59
19 Nov 2017	Walla News	27	19	11	21	7	10	3	8	7	7	—N/a	62	58
1 Nov 2017	Ten News	26	19	12	22	7	11	4	6	5	8	—N/a	59	61
1 Nov 2017	News Company	24	21	12	20	8	12	4	8	6	5	—N/a	62	58
28 Oct 2017	Panel HaMidgam Project/Statnet/Ten News	26	20	12	21	7	10	3	6	6	7	—N/a	58	60
17 Oct 2017	Panels Politics	25	20	11	22	6	13	4	7	6	6	—N/a	61	59
21 Sep 2017	Panels Politics	28	17	11	24	6	12	4	8	5	5	—N/a	63	57
22 Aug 2017	Geocartography	34	13	10	14	10	13	4	9	6	7	—N/a	76	44
13 Aug 2017	Panels	25	16	11	21	9	12	5	8	7	6	—N/a	66	54
6 Aug 2017	Panel HaMidgam Project/Channel 10	27–31	20–22	11	16–18	7	9–10	5–6	7	8	5	—N/a	63-69	52-56
3 Aug 2017	Maagar Mochot/Makor Rishon	30	16	13	20	9	12	4	6	5	5	—N/a	66	54
27 Jul 2017	Panel HaMidgam Project/Channel 10	28	20	10	17	7	13	6	7	7	5	—N/a	68	52
23 Jul 2017	Geocartography	32	18	10	17	6	9	5	9	9	5	—N/a	70	50
21 Jul 2017	Panels/Maariv/Jerusalem Post	24	19	11	22	9	13	5	7	5	5	—N/a	63	57
12 Jul 2017	Geocartography/Kol Brama	29	19	11	21	8	10	4	9	4	5	—N/a	64	56
12 Jul 2017	Panels/Walla	25	19	12	21	7	12	5	8	6	5	—N/a	63	57
11 Jul 2017	Panel HaMidgam Project/Channel 10	29	24	8	16	6	14	5	6	7	5	—N/a	67	53
11 Jul 2017	Midgam/Channel 2	25	20	13	18	8	13	5	7	6	5	—N/a	64	56
10 Jul 2017	Second round of Labor leadership election concludes with Avi Gabbay's victory													
7 Jul 2017	Panels/Maariv	25–26	16–17	12	20–21	8–9	12	5–6	7	6	6–7	—N/a	63-66	54-57
5 Jul 2017	Midgam/Channel 2 News	28–29	14–15	13	20–21	10–11	9	5	6	7	6	—N/a	67-65	55-53
5 Jul 2017	Midgam Panel + Statnet/Walla News	21–22	18	13	23	9–10	11	7	7	5	5	—N/a	60-62	59
4 Jul 2017	First round of Labor leadership election concludes with Avi Gabbay and Amir Peretz advancing to the second round													
26 May 2017	Midgam/Channel 2	30	12	13	22	7	9	7	7	7	6	—N/a	67	53
26 May 2017	Geocartography	26	11	13	24	6	11	4	9	8	8	—N/a	64	56
27 Apr 2017	Jewish Home leadership primaries concludes with Naftali Bennett's victory													
27 Apr 2017	Geocartography/Radio 103FM	23	11	13	25	7	13	6	9	7	6	—N/a	56	55
22 Apr 2017	Channel 22	28	12	13	24	7	10	7	7	6	6	—N/a	56	55
5 Apr 2017	Old Dialog/Channel 10	27	10	12	29	6	10	6	7	6	7	—N/a	62	58
29 Mar 2017	Walla	24	10	12	28	7	13	6	7	7	6	—N/a	64	56
24 Mar 2017	Panels/Maariv/Jerusalem Post	25	10	13	28	7	13	6	7	7	5	—N/a	65	55
17 Mar 2017	Channel 10	26	10	13	25	6	13	6	7	7	7	—N/a	65	55
20 Jan 2017	Panels	23	9	13	26	7	13	7	8	7	7	—N/a	65	55
17 Jan 2017	Channel 2	24	11	13	26	7	12	7	7	7	6	—N/a	64	56
12 Jan 2017	Walla	24	9	12	27	6	13	7	7	9	6	—N/a	66	54
9 Jan 2017	Geocartography/Globes	22	13	13	27	6	9	6	10	7	7	—N/a	60	60
5 Jan 2017	Teleseker/Channel 1	22	13	12	26	5	14	7	6	9	6	—N/a	63	57
1 Jan 2017	Smith/Reshet Moreshet	28	13	12	22	7	11	7	7	7	6	—N/a	67	53
30 Dec 2016	Statnet/Channel 10	23	8	12	27	7	12	8	7	10	6	—N/a	67	53
2 Dec 2016	Midgam/iPanel	25	10	13	25	7	11	7	7	8	7	—N/a	65	55
4 Nov 2016	Smith/Reshet Bet	26	13	13	21	7	12	7	7	8	6	—N/a	67	53
2 Oct 2016	Panels Politics/Maariv	22	10	13	27	6	14	7	7	9	5	—N/a	65	55
26 Sep 2016	TNS/Channel 1	21	12	13	25	6	13	8	7	9	6	—N/a	64	56
9 Sep 2016	Geocartography/Channel 1	23	11	13	27	6	11	4	9	9	7	—N/a	62	58
6 Sep 2016	Midgam/iPanel/Channel 2	22	13	13	24	6	14	6	7	10	5	—N/a	65	55
11 Aug 2016	Maagar Mochot	27	10	13	21	6	13	8	7	9	6	—N/a	70	50
7 Aug 2016	Geocartography	25	8	13	22	6	16	7	11	7	5	—N/a	72	48
3 Jun 2016	Jerusalem Post/Smith Poll	27	15	13	19	7	11	6	8	8	6	—N/a	67	53
29 May 2016	Geocartography/Kol Chai	27	8	13	21	7	14	4	10	8	8	—N/a	70	50
27 May 2016	Smith/Reshet Bet	28	15	13	19	6	10	7	8	8	6	—N/a	67	53
25 May 2016	Yisrael Beiteinu signs a coalition agreement with Likud to enter the government													
17 May 2016	Geocartography/Channel 1	27	11	13	24	6	8	4	10	9	8	—N/a	55	65
17 May 2016	Panels Politics/Maariv	26	13	11	18	6	14	7	7	11	7	—N/a	60	60
16 May 2016	Midgam/iPanel/Channel 2	27	17	13	18	7	10	6	7	9	6	—N/a	57	63
16 May 2016	Midgam/Statnet/Channel 10	25	13	14	20	9	12	6	6	9	6	—N/a	58	62
25 Mar 2016	Smith/Reshet Bet	26	17	12	19	7	11	7	7	8	6	—N/a	58	62
24 Mar 2016	Dialog/Haaretz	27	15	13	20	7	12	7	7	7	5	—N/a	60	60
18 Mar 2016	Maariv	26	15	12	21	6	12	7	6	9	6	—N/a	57	63
9 Mar 2016	TNS/Channel 1	25	15	13	21	6	12	7	7	8	6	—N/a	57	63
5 Mar 2016	Midgam/Channel 2	26	18	13	19	7	11	6	7	8	5	—N/a	57	63
26 Feb 2016	Smith/Reshet Bet	27	19	13	18	7	11	6	6	7	6	—N/a	57	63
19 Feb 2016	Panels Politics	27	15	12	18	6	12	7	7	10	6	—N/a	59	61
28 Jan 2016	Maagar Mochot	30	18	13	18	4	9	8	6	9	5	—N/a	57	63
21 Jan 2016	Channel 10	27	15	14	16	7	13	7	7	10	4	—N/a	61	59
1 Jan 2016	Midgam/Yediot Ahronot	25	18	13	18	7	12	6	7	8	6	—N/a	57	63
30 Nov 2015	Maagar Mochot	31	20	13	15	5	9	8	6	8	5	—N/a	59	61
17 Mar 2015	Election results	30	24	13	11	10	8	7	6	6	5	N/A	61	59
Date	Polling Firm													
Date	Polling Firm	Likud	Zionist Union	Joint List	Yesh Atid	Kulanu	Jewish Home	Shas	UTJ	Yisrael Beiteinu	Meretz	Orly Levy	C	O

== Scenario polls ==
=== If Netanyahu is indicted ===
Date	Polling firm	Likud	Labor	Blue & White	Kulanu	Ra'am –Balad	Shas	UTJ	URWP	Yisrael Beiteinu	Meretz	Hadash –Ta'al	New Right	Gesher	C
1 Mar 2019	Maagar Mochot/Radio 103 FM	25	7	37	5	–	6	6	10	–	6	7	8	–	60
27 Feb 2019	Number 10 Strategies/Times of Israel	25	8	44	6	–	–	8	6	–	5	8	10	–	55

Date	Polling firm	Likud	Labor	Joint List	Yesh Atid	Kulanu	Shas	UTJ	Hatnuah	Jewish Home	Yisrael Beiteinu	Meretz	New Right	Ta'al	Gesher	Hosen	C
22 Jan 2019	Midgam/Army Radio	25	9	6	14	6	6	7	0	4	6	5	7	6	5	14	55

=== Gideon Sa'ar leads Likud ===
Date	Polling firm	Likud	Zionist Union	Joint List	Yesh Atid	Kulanu	Shas	UTJ	Jewish Home	Yisrael Beiteinu	Meretz	Gesher	L	R
14 Nov	Panels Politics/Maariv	29	10	11	16	8	5	8	12	8	6	7	50	70

=== Mergers ===
Multiple polls were published about hypothetical mergers, some of which eventually materialized during the pre-campaign, such as Gantz, Ya'alon, Ashkenazi and Lapid (Blue and White), or Jewish Home, Tkuma and Otzma Yehudit (Union of the Right-Wing Parties).

Likud and Yisrael Beiteinu

Date	Polling firm	Likud +Yisrael Beiteinu	Zionist Union	Joint List	Yesh Atid	Kulanu	Jewish Home	Shas	UTJ	Meretz	Gesher	C
3 Jun 2018	Panels Politics/Walla News	36	10	12	16	8	11	5	8	6	8	68

Hosen with Telem (Moshe Ya'alon)

Date	Polling firm	Likud	Zionist Union	Joint List	Yesh Atid	Kulanu	Shas	UTJ	Jewish Home	Yisrael Beiteinu	Meretz	New Right	Gesher	Hosen +Telem	C
30 Dec 2018	Midgam/Channel 13	27	8	12	12	6	6	7	4	5	6	6	5	16	56

Hosen with Hatnuah (Tzipi Livni)

Date	Polling firm	Likud	Labor	Joint List	Yesh Atid	Kulanu	Shas	UTJ	Hosen with Hatnuah	Jewish Home	Yisrael Beiteinu	Meretz	New Right	Gesher	C
2 Jan 2019	News Company	31	8	12	11	5	5	7	15	4	5	5	6	6	58

Hosen with Yesh Atid (Yair Lapid)

Date	Polling firm	Likud	Labor	Joint List	Yesh Atid+ Hosen	Kulanu	Shas	UTJ	Hatn.	Jewish Home	Yisrael Beiteinu	Meretz	New Right	Ta'al	Gesher	C
20 Feb 2019	Panels Politics/Walla! News	33	9	5	34	4	4	7	—N/a	5	–	5	8	6	–	61
17 Feb 2019	Midgam/Channel 12	31	8	5	32	4	6	7	–	4	4	5	7	7	–	59
7 Feb 2019	Panel Project HaMidgam/Channel 13	32	5	6	36	4	6	6	–	5	5	–	9	6	–	62
6 Feb 2019	Direct Polls/Kan	35	4	6	35	4	5	6	–	4	5	4	6	6	–	60
1 Feb 2019	Panels Politics/Maariv	32	6	5	32	5	4	7	–	4	4	5	6	6	4	58
31 Jan 2019	Maagar Mochot/Israel Hayom & i24 News	30	–	9	32	4	–	8	–	–	–	4	7	—N/a	–	49
30 Jan 2019	Midgam/Channel 12	31	7	6	30	5	5	7	–	4	4	5	6	6	4	58
30 Jan 2019	Midgam/Channel 12	30	5	6	35	4	5	7	–	4	4	4	6	6	4	56
30 Jan 2019	Panel Politics/Walla! News	27	6	8	33	5	4	7	–	4	5	5	7	5	4	54
17 Jan 2019	Teleseker/Saloona	26	7	12	34	4	5	7	–	4	4	5	8	—N/a	4	54
17 Jan 2019	Panels Politics/Walla! News	33	7	10	28	4	4	7	–	5	5	5	8	—N/a	4	61

Date	Polling firm	Likud	Zionist Union	Joint List	Yesh Atid with Benny Gantz	Kulanu	Jewish Home	Shas	UTJ	Yisrael Beiteinu	Meretz	Gesher	C
27 Dec 2018	Maagar Mochot/Israel Hayom	30	8	12	25	6	10	4	7	5	5	6	57
27 Dec 2018	Panels/Channel 12	31	8	11	30	5	11	4	7	4	5	4	58
25 Dec 2018	Panel HaMidgam Project/Statnet/Ten News	27	9	12	26	7	9	5	7	6	6	6	55
25 Dec 2018	Panels Politics/Walla News	31	9	11	26	5	11	4	6	6	6	5	57
16 Dec 2018	Midgam/Channel 13	29	10	12	26	5	9	5	7	7	5	5	55

Hosen with the Zionist Union

Date	Polling firm	Likud	Zionist Union with Benny Gantz	Joint List	Yesh Atid	Kulanu	Jewish Home	Shas	UTJ	Yisrael Beiteinu	Meretz	Gesher	C
27 Dec 2018	Maagar Mochot/Israel Hayom	32	16	12	14	6	11	4	7	4	4	7	60
25 Dec 2018	Midgam/News Company	31	25	12	11	5	10	5	7	6	4	4	58
21 Nov 2018	Panels Politics/Walla News	30	26	13	11	5	13	4	8	5	5	–	60
17 Nov 2018	Midgam/News Company	26	24	12	14	7	9	7	6	6	4	5	55

Hosen with Yesh Atid and Labor

Date	Polling firm	Likud	Hosen +Yesh Atid +Labor	Joint List	Kulanu	Shas	UTJ	Hatnuah	Jewish Home	Yisrael Beiteinu	Meretz	New Right	Gesher	C
3 Jan 2019	Maagar Mochot/Israel Hayom	32	34	9	6	–	5	–	4	4	5	9	4	56

Hosen with Yesh Atid and Gabi Ashkenazi

Date	Polling firm	Likud	Labor	Joint List	Hosen +Yesh Atid +Ashkenazi	Kulanu	Shas	UTJ	Hatnuah	Jewish Home	Yisrael Beiteinu	Meretz	New Right	Ta'al	Gesher	C
7 Feb 2019	Midgam/Channel 12	32	5	5	36	5	6	7	–	–	4	5	8	7	–	58
6-7 Feb 2019	Maagar Mochot/Israel Hayom & i24 News	35	–	11	42	5	5	10	–	–	–	6	6	–	–	61

Hosen with Yesh Atid, Labor, Telem, Hatnua, Ashkenazi, Barak

Date	Polling firm	Likud	Hosen+ Yesh Atid+ Labor+ Telem+ Hatnuah+ Ashkenazi+ Barak	Joint List	Kulanu	Shas	UTJ	Jewish Home	Yisrael Beiteinu	Meretz	New Right	Gesher	C
17 Jan 2019	Teleseker/Saloona	26	40	11	4	5	7	4	4	4	9	4	55

Hosen with Kulanu and Gabi Ashkenazi

Date	Polling firm	Likud	Labor	Joint List	Yesh Atid	Kulanu+ Hosen+ Ashkenazi	Shas	UTJ	Jewish Home	Hatnuah	Yisrael Beiteinu	Meretz	New Right	Gesher	C
8 Jan 2019	Panels Politics/Walla! News	32	8	12	12	18	5	7	5	–	4	5	8	4	75

Union of right-wing parties

Date	Polling firm	Likud	Labor	Joint List	Yesh Atid	Kulanu	Shas	UTJ	Jewish Home +Tkuma +Yachad +Otzma	Hatnuah	Yisrael Beiteinu	Meretz	New Right	Gesher	Hosen	C
9 Feb 2019	Miskar/Srugim	30	6	5	13	9	–	5	13	–	–	–	7	–	24	
3 Jan 2019	Maagar Mochot/Israel Hayom	28	6	9	13	7	–	6	9	4	4	6	9	4	11	59

Haredim

Date	Polling firm	Likud	Labor	Joint List	Yesh Atid	Kulanu	Shas +UTJ	Jewish Home	Hatnuah	Yisrael Beiteinu	Meretz	New Right	Gesher	Hosen	C
16 Jan 2019	TNS/Kan	29	7	12	10	6	13	4	4	4	5	7	6	13	59

Yesh Atid and Hatnuah

Date	Polling firm	Likud	Labor	Joint List	Yesh Atid+ Hatnuah	Kulanu	Shas	UTJ	Jewish Home	Yisrael Beiteinu	Meretz	New Right	Ta'al	Gesher	Hosen Yisrael	C
14-16 Jan 2019	Midgam/Channel 12	32	8	6	17	4	6	7	–	5	5	8	6	4	12	57

Labor and Meretz

Date	Polling firm	Likud	Labor+ Meretz	Joint List	Yesh Atid	Kulanu	Shas	UTJ	Hatnuah	Jewish Home	Yisrael Beiteinu	New Right	Ta'al	Gesher	Hosen Yisrael
12 Feb	Panel Project HaMidgam/Channel 13	32	14	7	10	5	5	7	–	–	4	8	7	–	21
8 Feb 2019	Teleseker	29	12	7	9	5	5	6	–	4	4	6	5	5	23

Multiple mergers
Labor and Meretz, Hosen with Yesh Atid and Gabi Ashkenazi, Jewish Home and Tkuma

Date	Polling firm	Likud	Labor+ Meretz	Joint List	Yesh Atid+ Hosen+ Ashkenazi	Kulanu	Shas	UTJ	Hatn.	Jewish Home+ Tkuma	Yisrael Beiteinu	New Right	Ta'al	Gesher	Zehut	C
14 Feb 2019	Maagar Mochot/Israel Hayom & i24 News	28	12	9	32	–	4	8	–	11	–	6	5	–	5	57
6-7 Feb 2019	Maagar Mochot/Israel Hayom & i24 News	34	12	9	34	–	5	8	–	7	–	6	–	5	–	60

== Preferred prime minister polls ==
Some opinion pollsters have asked voters which party leader they would prefer as Prime Minister. Their responses are given as percentages in the tables below.

Date	Polling firm	Benjamin Netanyahu	Avi Gabbay	Yair Lapid	Avigdor Liberman	Naftali Bennett	Benny Gantz
5 Apr 2019	Panel Project HaMidgam/Statnet/Channel 13	46					37
4 Apr 2019	Midgam/Yedioth Ahronoth	41					32
4 Apr 2019	TNS/Kan	44					35
4 Apr 2019	Midgam/iPanel/Channel 12	36					35
3 Apr 2019	Panels Politics/Walla!	48					35
2 Apr 2019	Panel Project HaMidgam/Statnet/Channel 13	46					37
31 Mar 2019	Panels Politics/Channel 12	53					30
31 Mar 2019	Midgam/iPanel/Channel 12	38					36
28 Mar 2019	Midgam/iPanel/Yediot Ahronot	41					30
28 Mar 2019	Maagar Mohot/Israel Hayom & i24 News	46					36
28 Mar 2019	Panel Project HaMidgam/Statnet/Channel 13	51					36
27 Mar 2019	Panels Politics/Walla!	53					30
26 Mar 2019	Midgam/Army Radio	45					33
26 Mar 2019	TNS/Kan	45					34
24 Mar 2019	Midgam/Channel 12	39					34
24 Mar 2019	Panel Project HaMidgam/Statnet/Channel 13	45					38
22 Mar 2019	Maagar Mochot/Israel Hayom & i24 News	43					34
20 Mar 2019	Midgam/iPanel/Channel 12	36					34
20 Mar 2019	Panel Project HaMidgam/Statnet/Channel 13	41					42
19 Mar 2019	Panels Politics/Walla!	46					28
14 Mar 2019	Maagar Mochot/Israel Hayom & i24 News	44					37
14 Mar 2019	Midgam/Channel 12	40					31
11 Mar 2019	Panel Project HaMidgam/Statnet/Channel 13	47					37
7-8 Mar 2019	Midgam/iPanel/Yediot Ahronot	38					31
7 Mar 2019	Maagar Mochot/Israel Hayom & i24 News	42					38
5 Mar 2019	TNS/Kan	45					39
5 Mar 2019	Midgam/Channel 12	40					34
1 Mar 2019	Panel Project HaMidgam/Statnet/Channel 13	46					40
1 Mar 2019	Panel Project HaMidgam/Statnet/Channel 13	54		30			
28 Feb 2019	Maagar Mochot/Israel Hayom & i24 News	43					36
27 Feb 2019	Number 10 Strategies/The Times of Israel	41					39
24 Feb 2019	Maagar Mochot/Israel Hayom & i24 News	45					36
21 Feb 2019	Panels Politics/Maariv	48					36
21 Feb 2019	Midgam/Yediot Ahronot			36			
21 Feb 2019	Midgam/Channel 12			36			
21 Feb 2019	Panel HaMidgam Project/Statnet/Channel 13	45					36
17 Feb 2019	Midgam/Channel 12	36					31
14 Feb 2019	Maagar Mochot/Israel Hayom & i24 News	33	2	10	3	6	21
12 Feb 2019	Panel Project HaMidgam/Channel 13	46					36
7 Feb 2019	Panel HaMidgam Project/Channel 13	48					35
7 Feb 2019	Midgam/Channel 12	37	3	9			26
6-7 Feb 2019	Maagar Mochot/Israel Hayom & i24 News	36	2	10	2	5	22
6 Feb 2019	Smith/Channel 20	40		9			22
1 Feb 2019	Panels Politics/Maariv	35	2	9		3	29
1 Feb 2019	Panels Politics/Maariv	44					41
1 Feb 2019	Panels Politics/Maariv	50		26			
31 Jan 2019	Maagar Mochot/Israel Hayom & i24 News	38	3	9	3	3	22
30 Jan 2019	Midgam/Channel 12	36					35
30 Jan 2019	Panel Project HaMidgam/Channel 13	42					42
30 Jan 2019	Panel Project HaMidgam/Channel 13	51		30			
30 Jan 2019	Direct Polls/Kan	47					41
30 Jan 2019	Direct Polls/Kan	49		14			
30 Jan 2019	Direct Polls/Kan	50	8				
16 Jan 2019	Midgam/Channel 12	36					28
16 Jan 2019	Midgam/Channel 12	38		21			
16 Jan 2019	TNS/Kan	42					31
11 Jan 2019	Maagar Mochot/Radio 103 FM	44	5	10			21
8 Jan 2019	Panel Project HaMidgam/Channel 10	41					38
8 Jan 2019	Panel Project HaMidgam/Channel 10	45		29			
4 Jan 2019	Panels Politics/Maariv	49					26
3 Jan 2019	Smith/Jerusalem Post	39	4	9	5	7	14
3 Jan 2019	Maagar Mochot/Israel Hayom	35	5	10	2	5	15
2 Jan 2019	TNS/Kan	40		24			30
2 Jan 2019	Midgam/iPanel/News Company	35					28
2 Jan 2019	Midgam/iPanel/News Company	38		17			

Date	Polling firm	Benjamin Netanyahu	Gideon Sa'ar	Avi Gabbay	Tzipi Livni	Yair Lapid	Moshe Kahlon	Naftali Bennett	Avigdor Liberman	Moshe Ya'alon	Benny Gantz	Ehud Barak
30 Dec 2018	Midgam/Channel 13	36									29	
27 Dec 2018	Maagar Mochot/Israel Hayom	35		6		10		5	3	3	14	
25 Dec 2018	Sarid/Kan News	37		7		13	6		3		13	
25 Dec 2018	Panels Politics/Walla!	40		6		9					12	
21 Nov 2018	Panels Politics/Walla!	36	6	3	5	6		4	2		11	
14-15 Nov 2018	Smith/News 20	30		4		9		8	5		15	
7 Oct 2018	Midgam/News company	38		4		9		1	5		12	
25 Jun 2018	Midgam/News company	34		3		9	5	3			13	
8 Jun 2018	Channel 10	39		7		13		6	4			
12 Mar 2018	Knesset Channel	35	7	4	9	12		6	2			
12 Mar 2018	Midgam/News company	36		8		12		6				
8 Mar 2018	Panels Politics/Walla!	39		11		16						
1 Mar 2018	Panels Politics/Walla!	37		9		20						
21 Jan 2018	Panels Politics/Walla!	33		11		18						
10-11 Jan 2018	Midgam/iPanel	35				23						
27-29 Dec 2017	Maagar Mochot/Makor Rishon	24		6		18		6	3	17		
4 Dec 2017	News Company	35				20						
4 Dec 2017	News Company	39		19								
1 Dec 2017	Panels Politics/Maariv	26		9		18	5	6	4			
19 Nov 2017	Walla!	31		7		14	9					7
9 Nov 2017	Panels Politics/Maariv	36		14		11	4	5	3			
28 Oct 2017	Channel 10	28		11		11		5	3			6
17 Oct 2017	Panels Politics	33		13		16	4	6	2			
21 Sep 2017	Panels Politics		15	12		23	6	10		4		3
27 Jul 2017	Panel HaMidgam Project/Channel 10	32		13		14		7	7			
21 Jul 2017	Panels/Maariv/Jerusalem Post	26		12		14	8	8	3			
12 Jul 2017	Panels Politics/Walla!	35		16		16	7	7	3			
11 Jul 2017	Panel HaMidgam Project/Channel 10	37		14		12		8	7			
11 Jul 2017	Midgam/Channel 2	34		13		12		6				

Date	Polling firm	Benjamin Netanyahu	Gideon Sa'ar	Isaac Herzog	Yair Lapid	Naftali Bennett	Avigdor Liberman	Moshe Ya'alon	Gabi Ashkenazi	Ehud Barak
26 May 2017	Midgam/Channel 2	35		4	14	5		6		9
5 Apr 2017	Old Dialog/Channel 10	23	11	4	18	5	4			
12 Jan 2017	Walla!	37			33					
5 Jan 2017	Teleseker/Channel 1	23		4	21	7	5	6		4
30 Dec 2016	Statnet/Channel 10	27		5	15	7		9		
21 Jan 2016	Channel 10	35		9		11	11		9	
