= Yesh Atid =

Israeli political party

Yesh Atid יש עתיד يوجد أمل
- Leader: Yair Lapid
- Founded: 29 April 2012
- Headquarters: Tel Aviv
- Ideology: Liberalism (Israeli); Liberal Zionism; Anti-clericalism; Secularism (Israeli)
- Political position: Centre
- National affiliation: Together (since 2026); Blue & White (2019–2020)
- International affiliation: Liberal International
- Colours: Blue; Orange
- Slogan: באנו לשנות ('We are here to change')
- Knesset: 5 / 120

Election symbol
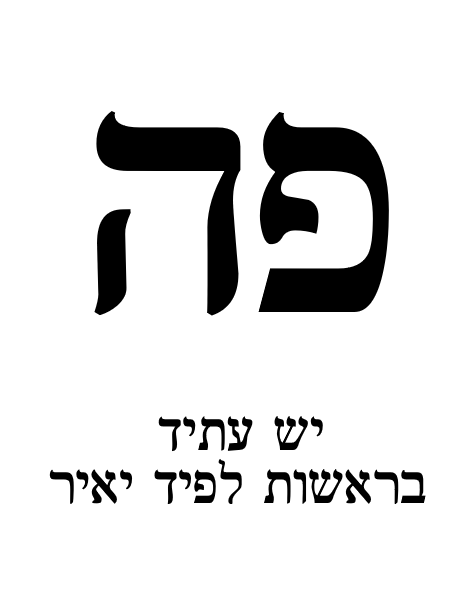
- פה ف‌ه

Website
- yeshatid.org.il
- Politics of Israel; Political parties; Elections; A: The party has also been evaluated as centre-left and centre-right.

Yesh Atid (Hebrew: יֵשׁ עָתִיד, lit. 'There is a Future') is a centrist political party in Israel. It was founded in 2012 by former TV journalist Yair Lapid, the son of the former Shinui party politician and Israeli Justice Minister Tommy Lapid.

Yesh Atid placed second in the election, winning 19 seats in the 120-seat Knesset in its first election. It then entered into a coalition led by the Likud party. In the 2015 election the party refused to back the Likud; after suffering a significant setback and losing seats, it joined the opposition.

On 21 February 2019, Yesh Atid united with the Israel Resilience Party to form a centrist alliance named Blue and White for the upcoming election. Yesh Atid and Telem left the alliance on 29 March 2020 and formed an independent faction in the Knesset. Yesh Atid ran in the 2021 election alone and won 17 seats, the second-largest party in the Knesset, making up the largest party in Israel's governing coalition at the time, with party leader Yair Lapid serving as prime minister in 2022.

In the 2022 elections Yesh Atid won 24 seats, more than in any previous election, but was unable to form a government. Likud, led by Benjamin Netanyahu, formed a government, with Yesh Atid returning to opposition.

The party formed an alliance, named Together, with Bennett 2026 in April 2026, ahead of the 2026 Israeli legislative election. Yesh Atid won five seats in the election.

== History ==
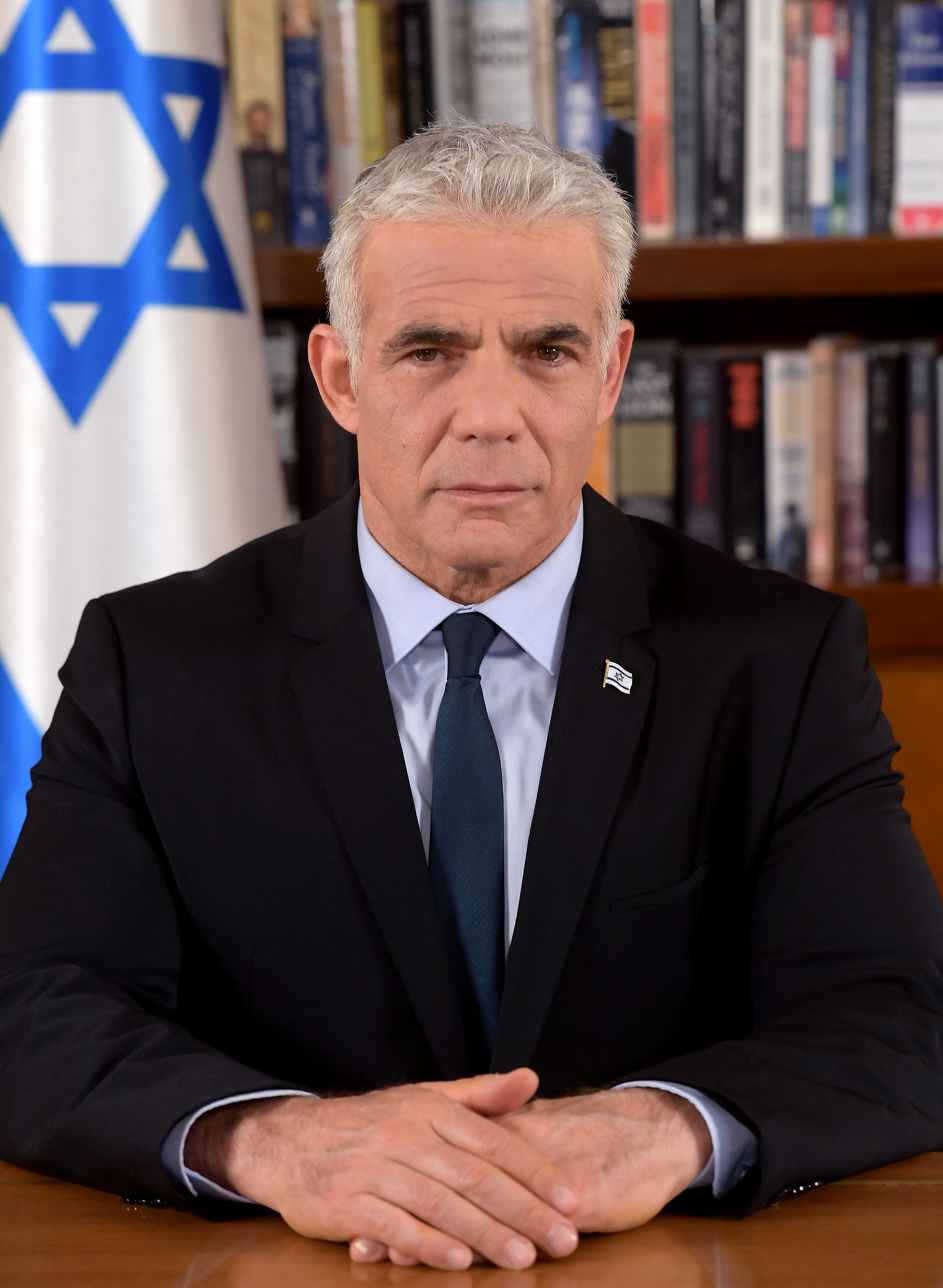
In January 2012, TV anchor Yair Lapid announced that he was leaving journalism for politics.

In early 2010, speculation arose in the Israeli media concerning the possibility that Israeli journalist and television figure Yair Lapid, who at the time worked as a news anchor at Channel 2, would end his career in journalism and begin a career in Israeli politics. Initially, Lapid dismissed these reports. The Knesset initiated legislation to lessen the influx of Israeli journalists running for a position by prohibiting them as candidates in the first year after they ended their journalism careers. Despite widespread interest in Lapid, he declined to be interviewed.

He gained support through social networks, primarily his Facebook page. Among his official announcements, Lapid said he would not join Kadima or the Israeli Labor Party. In addition, Lapid announced that he would work to change the system of government, have all Israelis conscripted to serve time in the army, and would work to change the Israeli matriculation program. In early January 2012, Lapid officially announced that he would quit journalism in order to enter politics, and that he would lead a new party.

In April 2012, the proposed new party was reported to be named "Atid". Lapid said that the party would not have any members who were legislators or Members of Knesset (MKs). On 29 April, Lapid registered his party as "Yesh Atid", after the name "Atid" was rejected. On 1 May, the first party conference was held, in which Lapid revealed the "Lapid Program" ("תוכנית לפיד"): military service for all Israelis. According to the party's rules, Lapid would determine the candidates who would run for a seat in the Knesset—for he would be the one to make the final decisions on political issues—and was guaranteed the position of chairman of the party during the terms of the 19th and 20th Knessets. The party was capped at raising 13.5 million shekels for the 2013 Israeli legislative election.

Lapid has said his party is different from his late father's Shinui, in part because of its diversity and its inclusion of religious figures. Despite this, analysts have found them somewhat similar.

Yesh Atid presented centrist populism to its middle and upper-middle class constituency, with anti-incumbent messages and calls for cleaner politics, similar to so-called "new/centrist populist parties" that have arisen in Europe. Yesh Atid voters tend to have higher levels of income and education compared to the general population, and hold moderate views on economic and security issues.

=== 19th Knesset ===
Party logo used during the 2013 Israeli legislative election

In the election held on 22 January 2013, Yesh Atid won the second-largest share of representation in the Knesset, with 19 seats. The party was particularly strong in wealthy districts and cities like Tel Aviv, Givatayim, Ramat Gan and Herzliya. Yesh Atid's success was viewed as the largest surprise of the election, as pre-election polling gave the party only 8-11 seats. He joined Netanyahu's governing coalition. Although he focused mostly on domestic and economic concerns of social justice, he had criticized Netanyahu's foreign policy and said he would not sit in a government that was not serious about pursuing peace.

Lapid endorsed Netanyahu for prime minister after the election, and on 15 March 2013, the party signed a coalition agreement with the ruling Likud party.

Almost one year after the election, a survey was published showing a continuing trend of decreasing popularity of the party, which would only achieve 10 seats in the Knesset, as opposed to the 19 party members who were elected, if elections were held at that time, and with 75% of those polled claiming to be disappointed by Lapid's performance. The finance ministry post came with budgetary restrictions (cutting spending, raising taxes, and confronting the money demands of the defense ministry) that affected Lapid's popularity.

=== 20th Knesset ===
==== Run-up to the 2015 election ====
Before the 2015 election, Lapid separately courted both Tzipi Livni (Hatnuah) and Moshe Kahlon (Kulanu) in an effort to form electoral alliances with their respective parties. Both efforts were unsuccessful: Livni formed an alliance with Labor, and Kahlon preferred to run alone. On 8 February 2015, Yesh Atid MK Shai Piron said the party would prefer a coalition led by Isaac Herzog and Livni than one by Netanyahu.

Lapid's criticism while campaigning was mostly of Netanyahu and his Likud party. His campaign continued to emphasize the economy over national security, although he has somewhat departed from his previous almost-exclusive focus on domestic policy and become more vocal, and left-leaning, on the peace process. The party focused on middle-class needs and in this respect was very similar to Kahlon's new Kulanu party. However, Lapid's main electoral base is the European-oriented upper-middle class, whereas Kahlon targeted the lower-middle class. While both Yesh Atid and Kulanu are positioned as centrist parties, Yesh Atid is almost universally considered to be aligned with the left-leaning political bloc, and Kulanu, sometimes considered right-leaning, is a "swing" party not aligned with any bloc.

==== Aftermath ====
Yesh Atid won 11 seats in the 20th Knesset, making it the fourth-largest faction. However, it increased in popularity throughout 2017 and the first months of 2018, rivalling Likud as the biggest party in opinion polls. After the Haredim received favorable draft concessions in a negotiated deal among the government coalition, Yair Lapid denounced the arrangements as an "insult to the IDF" and a "fraud".

=== 24th Knesset ===
In the 2021 Israeli legislative election, Yesh Atid ran alone and became the second largest party in the Knesset with 17 seats and getting votes in many cities in Israel including Tel Aviv, Herzliya, Ramat HaSharon, Kiryat Ono and Ramat Gan. On 9 May 2021, it was reported that Lapid and Yamina leader Naftali Bennett had made major headway in the coalition talks. The anti-Netanyahu coalition has been described as the "Change bloc". Coalition whip Boaz Toporovsky described Yesh Atid as taking a more "statesmanlike" tone, and having learned from its experience.

After cultivating ties with liberal parties worldwide, Yesh Atid was admitted to the Liberal International, in October 2021 as an observer member.

=== 25th Knesset ===
The 2022 Israeli legislative election resulted in Yesh Atid winning 24 seats, its best result yet, with the party gaining the most votes in most areas in Tel Aviv and in the other cities in Israel. However, it failed to form government and returned to the opposition.

In October 2023, it was announced that Yesh Atid would hold its first leadership primary elections, which were contested by incumbent leader Yair Lapid and MK Ram Ben-Barak. The elections were held on 28 March 2024; Lapid won with 52.5% of the vote, narrowly beating Ben-Barak by 308 votes to 279, a margin of 29 votes.

Lapid sought to dissolve the Knesset in mid-July 2025, seeking the signatures of 61 MKs, as a dissolution attempt the previous month had failed. The bill would require the support of nine MKs outside of the opposition.

=== 26th Knesset ===
==== Run-up to the 2026 election ====
On 26 April 2026, Lapid and Bennett 2026 leader Naftali Bennett announced in a joint press conference that Yesh Atid and Bennett's party, Bennett 2026, would run jointly in the 2026 election as part of a new political alliance, Together, which will be led by Bennett.

The alliance was tied or ahead of Likud in polling when it was first announced, but Yashar, headed by Gadi Eisenkot, supplanted it, starting in June.

Numerous Yesh Atid MKs announced in early September that they would not run in the election.

The party won five seats in the election.

== Current MKs ==
Year	Members	Total
2026	Yair Lapid, Meirav Ben-Ari, Noam Tibon, Meirav Cohen, Ram Ben-Barak	5

== Political position ==
In general, Yesh Atid is mainly regarded as a centrist party; however, it has also been evaluated as "centre-right" or "centre-left". This party has both free market and socially liberal tendencies which indicate an inclination towards libertarianism. It also seeks to represent what it considers the centre of Israeli society: the secular middle class. It focuses primarily on civic, socio-economic, and governance issues, including government reform and enforcing Haredi conscription. Yesh Atid has endorsed reentering peace negotiations with the Palestinians and halting further construction in Israeli settlements. Yesh Atid supports the separation of religion and state, specifically by integrating Haredi Jews into the labor market and the Israel Defense Forces.

== Platform ==
In the application submitted to the party registrar, Lapid listed the party's eight goals, which included:

1. Changing the priorities in Israel, with an emphasis on civil life – education, housing, health, transport, and policing, as well as improving the condition of the middle class.
2. Changing the system of government.
3. Equality in education and the draft – all Israeli school students must be taught essential classes, all Israelis will be drafted into the Army, and all Israeli citizens will be encouraged to seek work, including the ultra-Orthodox sector and the Arab sector.
4. Fighting political corruption, including corruption in government in the form of institutions like "Minister without portfolio", opting for a government of 18 ministers at most, fortifying the rule of law, and protecting the status of the High Court of Justice.
5. Growth and economic efficiency – creating growth engines as a way of fighting poverty, combatting red tape, removing barriers, improving the transportation system, reducing the cost of living and housing costs, and improving social mobility through assistance to small businesses.
6. Legislation of Education Law in cooperation with teachers' unions, eliminating most of the matriculation exams, raising the differential education index, and increasing school autonomy.
7. Enacting a constitution to regulate tense relations between population groups in Israel.
8. Striving for peace according to an outline of "two states for two peoples", while maintaining the large Israeli settlement blocs and ensuring the safety of Israel.

=== Other positions ===
Yesh Atid is also in favor of the following:

- Creating greater religious pluralism, diversity, and equality between Jews and all movements of Judaism within Israel by instituting public funding by the state for the non-Orthodox movements within Judaism, such as the Reform, Conservative, Reconstructionist, and Humanistic movements, similar to the public funding of the Orthodox Chief Rabbinate by the state
  - Allowing non-Orthodox movements to perform religious conversions and weddings, and have their conversions and weddings accepted as legitimate by the state
  - Allowing egalitarian prayer between men and women, and all Orthodox and non-Orthodox Jewish religious movements, at the Western Wall
- Partial operation of public transportation on Saturdays
- Renewing peace negotiations with the Palestinians and halting construction in Israeli settlements
- Gradually ending Israel's dependency on fossil fuels to become carbon neutral in 2050

Yesh Atid supports increasing LGBT rights. The party supports the following policies:

- Allowing surrogacy for same-sex couples
- Instituting civil marriage in Israel, including between same-sex couples
- Allowing same-sex adoption of Israeli children. Currently, Israeli same-sex couples are allowed to adopt foreign children, but not Israeli ones
- Introducing more stringent punishment for hate crimes against queer individuals
- Banning conversion therapy
- Allowing individuals to change their gender in their identity card without having to undergo gender-affirming surgery
- Releasing guidelines on the treatment of queer individuals in the education system and incorporating mandatory queer studies.

== Leaders ==
Leader	Took office	Left office
Yair Lapid	2012	Incumbent

== Election results ==
=== Knesset ===
Election	Leader	Votes	%	Seats	+/−	Government
2013	Yair Lapid	543,458	14.33 (#2)	19 / 120		Coalition
2015	Yair Lapid	371,602	8.81 (#4)	11 / 120	▼8	Opposition
Apr 2019	Yair Lapid	with Blue and White		15 / 120	▲4	Snap election
Sep 2019	Yair Lapid	with Blue and White		13 / 120	▼2	Snap election
2020	Yair Lapid	with Blue and White		13 / 120	Steady	Opposition
2021	Yair Lapid	614,112	13.93 (#2)	17 / 120	▲4	Coalition
2022	Yair Lapid	847,435	17.79 (#2)	24 / 120	▲7	Opposition
2026	Yair Lapid	with Together		5 / 120	▼19	TBA

== See also ==
- Elections in Israel
