= Brunei–Israel relations =

- Israel: Brunei

Brunei and Israel do not have bilateral relations, and Brunei does not recognize Israel as a state. Brunei does not accept Israeli passports and Brunei passports are not valid for travel to Israel.

== History ==
Since Brunei independence in 1984, no relations were established between Brunei and Israel. In 1988, Brunei recognized the Palestinian Declaration of Independence of the Palestine Liberation Organization (PLO).

In 1999, a representative of the Bruneian Sultan have visited Israel for a business convection to meet with Israeli businessmen.

Brunei criticized Israel's actions during the 2021 Israel–Palestine crisis, and together with Indonesia and Malaysia urged the United Nations to end "the atrocities carried out against the Palestinian people". In June, Sagi Karni, Israel's ambassador to Singapore, said that Israel would be willing to establish diplomatic relations with southeast Asia's Muslim-majority countries, including Brunei: "We are willing to talk, we are willing to meet, and the door is open as far as we are concerned. I don't think it's so difficult to find us."

== See also ==
- Foreign relations of Brunei
- Foreign relations of Israel
