= List of ambassadors of Israel to Angola =

== List of ambassadors ==
- Leo Vinovezky 2025-
- Shimon Solomon 2022-2025
- Oren Rozenblat 2016 - 2022
- Raphael Singer 2013 - 2016
- Irit Savion-Waidergorn 2011 - 2013
- Sagi Karni 2008 - 2010
- Avraham Benjamin 2005 - 2008
- Bahij Mansour 2001 - 2005
- Tamar Golan 1995 - 1999
