= Tamar Golan =

Israeli journalist and diplomat

- תמר גולן
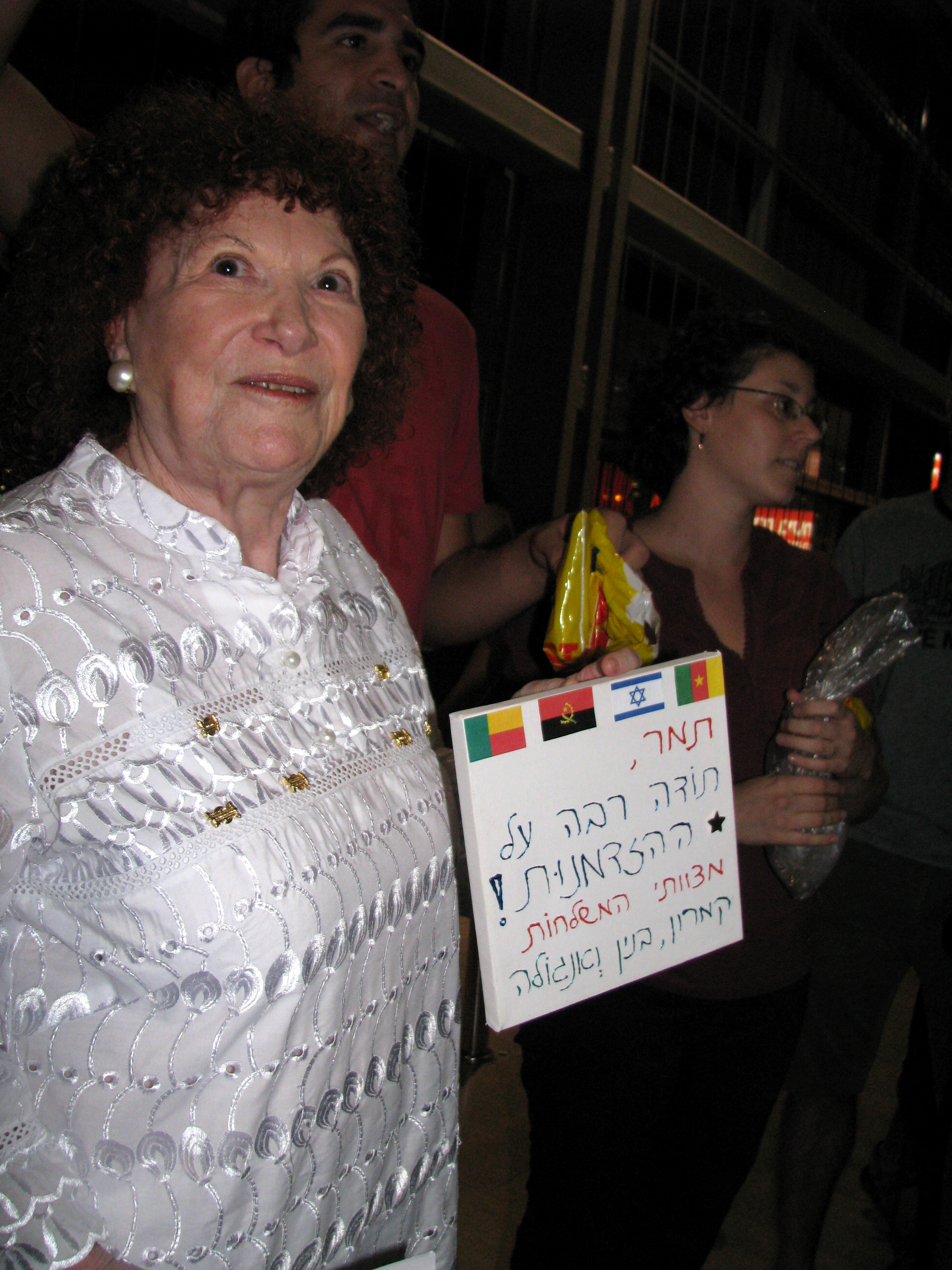
- Tamar Golan in 2010
- Born: 18 December 1933; Haifa, Israel
- Died: 30 March 2011 (aged 77); Haifa, Israel
- Education: Columbia University
- Occupations: Journalist, diplomat

Tamar Golan (Hebrew: תמר גולן; 18 December 1933 – 30 March 2011) was an Israeli journalist and diplomat, who was known especially for her work to promote relations between Israel and African nations, and for her effort to increase knowledge and awareness of African culture in Israel.

== Biography ==
Golan was born in Haifa in 1933. As a youth, she was active in Hashomer Hatzair. She did her compulsory army service at the Nahal brigade, and joined a group of soldiers who were sent to help in Kibbutz Lahav, north of Beersheba. When she finished her army service, Golan became a member of the kibbutz. After earning a doctorate at Columbia University, she began her professional career.

She went to Africa for the first time in 1961 when she, with her husband, Aviyahu Golan, joined an Israeli delegation to Ethiopia and served there as a teacher. She returned to Kibbutz Lahav in 1958 following her husband's death in Ethiopia. She never remarried. She worked as a journalist in several Israeli media outlets, and in the BBC African department, but spent most of her career with Maariv, reporting from African and Arab countries. She was also worked as Maariv reporter in Paris. The fact that she had dual Israeli-French nationality, and therefore entitled to French passport, helped her enter countries hostile to Israel.

She built a network of contacts with influential figures in Africa and in France, and received requests from Israeli official to help maintaining contacts with African leaders, especially following the Six-Day War, when many African countries cut their diplomatic relations with Israel. In 1994 Golan was named the Israeli ambassador to Angola.

She served there from 1995 until 2002. She returned to Angola later on, upon the request of the Angolan president, in order to help establish a taskforce, under the auspices of the UN, for the removal of landmines. When she came back to Israel, Golan returned to Kibbutz Lahav and lived there for the rest of her life, though she did not renew her kibbutz membership. She became active in a foundation that helped Bedouin youths obtain higher education and established a center for African studies at Ben-Gurion University in Beersheba.

=== Death ===
Tamar Golan took her own life 30 March 2011, aged 77, at a hotel in her native Haifa. In a letter she left, which was made public by the Africa Center she established, she expresses frustration over recent political developments in Africa and the Middle East. She mentions "the downhill deterioration" in Ivory Coast and that Angola was still "corruption stricken". About the situation in the Middle East she says in her letter "I am tired of feeling like Don Quixote who tries to tilt at the windmills of deteriorating reality in this country". A close friend of Tamar Golan, who was with her among the first residents of Kibbutz Lahav, told Haaretz that Golan suffered from deteriorating health—"her body betrayed her, and she could not bear it anymore", she said.

== See also ==
- Angola–Israel relations
