= Angola–Israel relations =

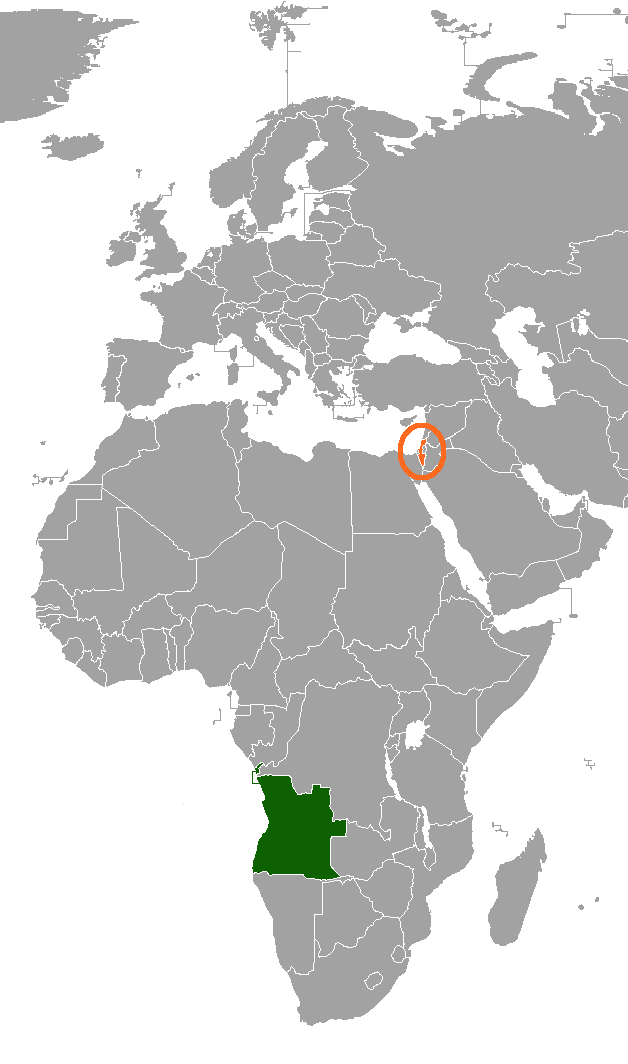
- Angola: Israel

Angola and Israel established diplomatic relations in 1993. In 1995, Israel opened an embassy in Luanda and in 2000, Angola opened an embassy in Tel Aviv.

== History ==
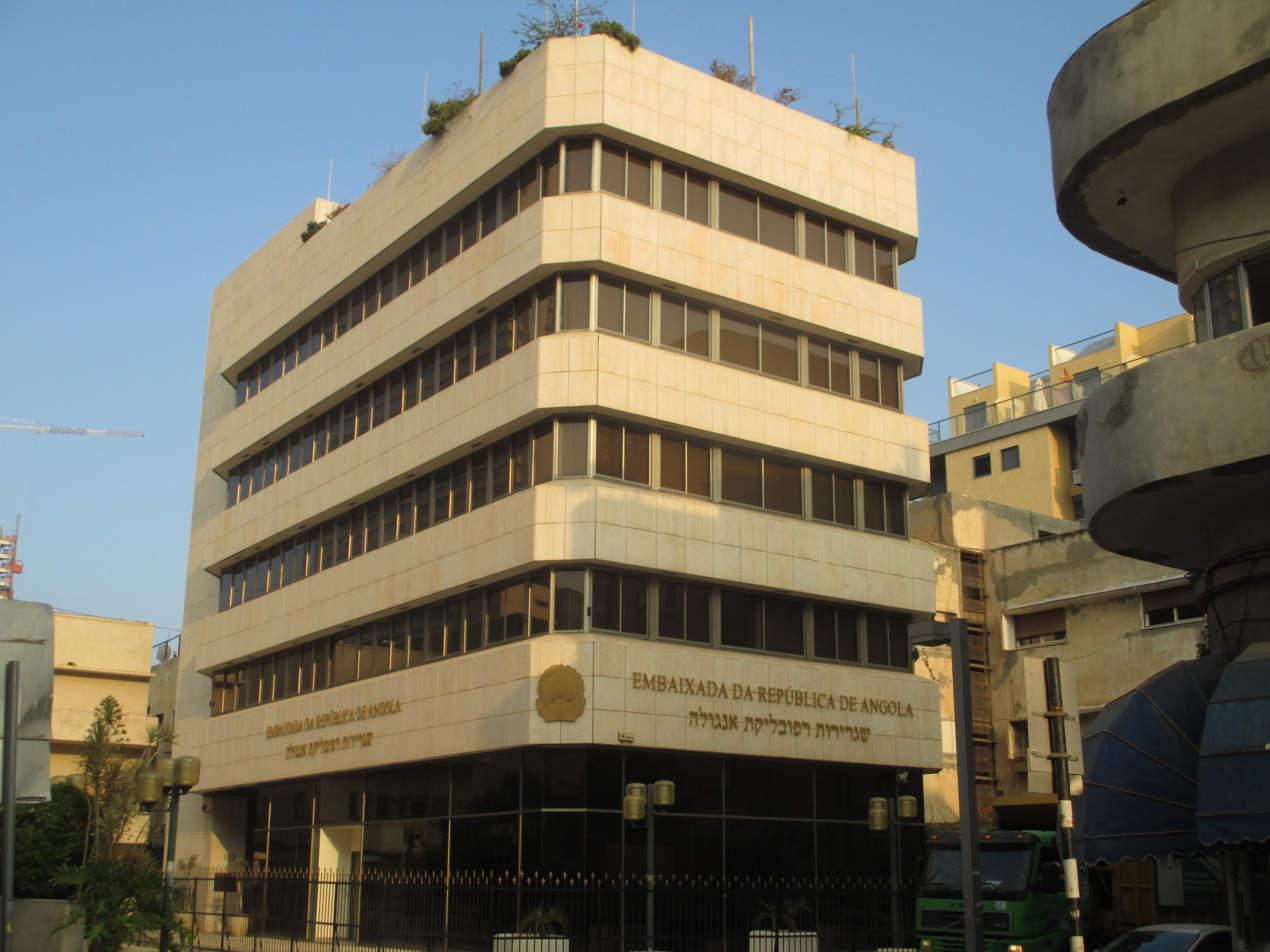
Angola Embassy, Tel Aviv

The Israeli government aided the National Liberation Front of Angola in 1963 and 1969, during the Angolan War of Independence. In the 1960s, Holden Roberto, head of the NFLA, visited Israel and FNLA members were sent to Israel for training. In the 1970s, Israel shipped arms to the FNLA through Zaire.

Angola and Israel established relations on April 16th 1992, following the end of the Cold War.

The Israeli embassy in Luanda opened in 1995, and Tamar Golan, who had worked to maintain Israeli contacts with African countries in the previous decades, was appointed the Israeli ambassador. Tamar Golan left this post in 2002, but returned to Angola later on upon the request of the Angolan President José Eduardo dos Santos to help establish a taskforce, under the auspices of the UN, for the removal of landmines. The Israeli company "Geomine" provided Angola with mine detecting equipment, in order to facilitate their removal.

President Dos Santos visited Israel in 2005. In March 2006, the trade volume between the two countries amounted to $400 million.

In August 2012, the Angolan president took a three-day visit to Jerusalem, where the governments of Angola and Israel ratified an agreement in Tel Aviv to strengthen the bonds between both countries. Israeli President Shimon Peres said that this should be based on the fields of science and technology, economy, and security, and the Angolan president expressed the desire to continue with the bilateral cooperation in health, agriculture, science and technology, and the formation of Angolan experts.

In 2016, Angola voted in favour of UN Security Council Resolution 2334, condemning Israeli settlements in East Jerusalem and the West Bank as illegal. In response, Israeli Prime Minister Netanyahu cancelled Israeli aid to Angola.

In 2018, Angola condemned Israeli violence against Palestinians, after the US moving its embassy to Jerusalem caused an uptick in tensions.

In October 2023, Angolan president Joao Lourenco called for Israeli efforts to prevent a humanitarian disaster following the outbreak of the Gaza war, saying: “while acknowledging Israel's right to defend itself and protect the lives of its citizens, the truth is that the Palestinian people also possess the same right. They have been living for decades in a continuous occupation and annexation of parts of their territory - a situation deemed unacceptable in the 21st century.”

== See also ==
- Foreign relations of Angola
- Foreign relations of Israel
- Arcadi Gaydamak
- Angolagate
