= Sagi Karni =

Israeli diplomat

Sagi Karni (Hebrew: שגיא קרני; born 28 July 1967) is an Israeli diplomat. He was the Ambassador of Israel to Singapore from 2019 to 2023, and Ambassador to Angola and non-resident Ambassador to Mozambique and São Tomé and Príncipe from 2008 to 2010. Other major posts including Consul General to Hong Kong and Macau from 2013 to 2017, Counselor for Political affairs & Press of Israeli Mission to the EU in Brussel from 2005 to 2008, Deputy Chief of Mission of Israeli Embassy in Oslo from 2000 to 2001, and Second Secretary of Israeli Embassy in Beijing from 1998 to 2000.

He graduated with a Bachelor of Science in biology and philosophy from the Hebrew University of Jerusalem and a master's degree in public policy from the Tel Aviv University. He also earned diploma of Mandarin in Taipei, Taiwan.
