= Shimon Solomon =

Israeli politician

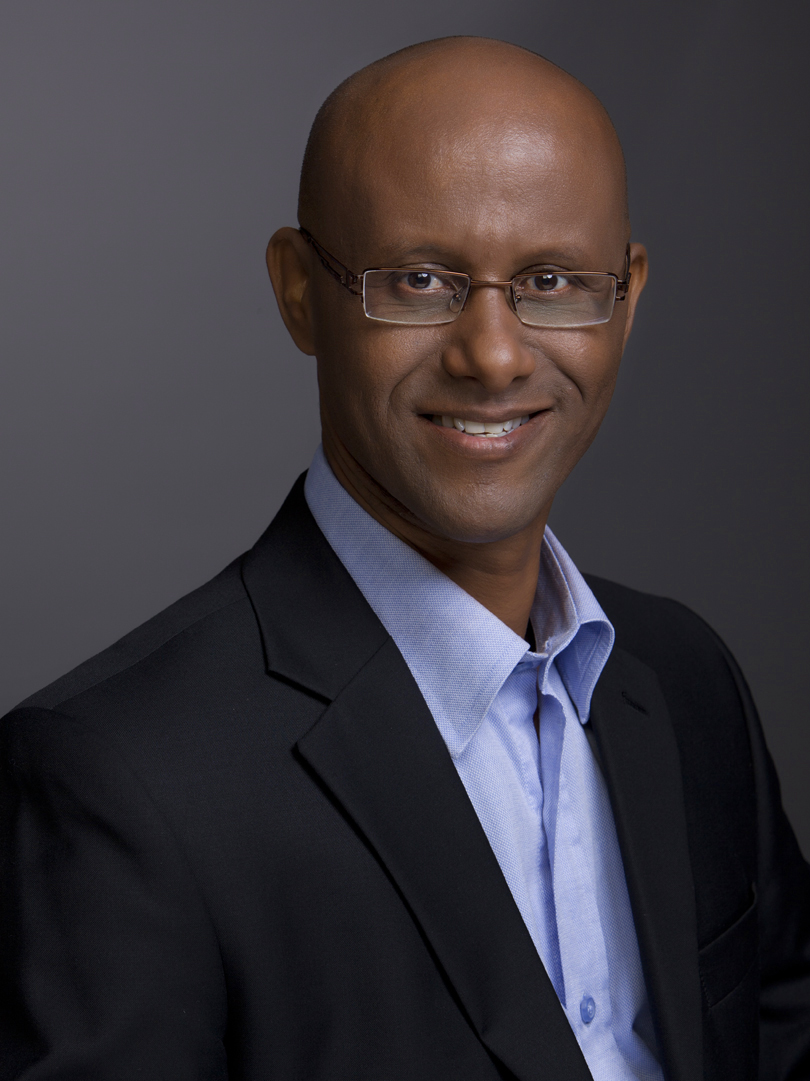

Faction represented in the Knesset
- 2013–2015: Yesh Atid

Diplomatic roles
- 2022–: Ambassador to Angola

Personal details
- Born: 5 August 1968 (age 58) Ethiopia

Shimon Solomon (Hebrew: שמעון סולומון; born 5 August 1968) is an Israeli diplomat and former politician. He served as a member of the Knesset for Yesh Atid between 2013 and 2015 and was appointed Ambassador to Angola in 2022.

== Biography ==
Born in the Tigray Region of Ethiopia, Solomon immigrated to Israel in 1980 as part of Operation Brothers. He earned a BA in social work at Ben-Gurion University of the Negev in 1991. He then worked as an educational consultant at AMIT high school in Beersheba from 1992 until 1994, before becoming an educational advisor to the Minister of Education, Culture and Sports in Jerusalem between 1994 and 1996. Between 1996 and 1999 he served as an advisor to the Association for the Advancement of Education, as well as becoming executive director of an Ethiopian community centre.

In 1999 he returned to the Ministry of Education, where he worked as an advisor to two Education Ministers until 2001. After a short spell at the Society for the Protection of Nature in Israel in 2003, he became Director of Employment Services for Ethiopian Academics for the Jewish Agency and the Ministry of Absorption between 2003 and 2005.

Solomon began studying for an MA in educational policy in administration at the Hebrew University of Jerusalem in 2004, but ended his studies to go abroad, having been appointed as a consul at the Israeli embassy in Addis Ababa in Ethiopia in 2005. Returning to Israel, he became director of an immigrant absorption centre in Beersheba from 2007 to 2008. He then worked as director of education at the Agahozo-Shalom youth village, a boarding school in Rwanda from 2008 to 2012.

He was one of the founders of the new Yesh Atid party prior to the 2013 elections, and was placed twelfth on the party's list, becoming a Knesset member as the party won 19 seats. Prior to the 2015 elections, he chose not to run for re-election. In 2022 he was appointed Ambassador to Angola.

For several years was the CEO of the High School of Agriculture and Science at Kfar Silver.
