= Opinion polling for the 2026 Israeli legislative election =

In the run up to the 2026 Israeli legislative election, various organisations conducted opinion polling to gauge voting intention in Israel during the term of the twenty-fifth Knesset. This article lists the results of such polls. The date range for these opinion polls was from the 2022 Israeli legislative election, held on 1 November 2022, to 23 October 2026. In keeping with the election silence law, no polls were published from the end of the Friday before the election until the polling stations closed on election day at 22:00.

== Pollsters and publishers ==
The below table only lists pollsters and publishers that regularly publish mandate polls.

Publisher	Polling firm	Period of use
Channel 13	Camil Fuchs, Midgam Project, Stat-Net	2022 election – 13 March 2024
Channel 13	Maagar Mochot, Stat-Net	10 June 2024 – 25 May 2026
Channel 13	Midgam Project, The Madad, Stat-Net, Askaria	Since 17 June 2026
Channel 14	Shlomo Filber, Direct Polls	2022 election – 5 June 2025
Channel 14	Shlomo Filber	12 June 2025 – 26 April 2026
Channel 14	Shlomo Filber, NEXT DATA	Since 7 May 2026
Channel 16	Maagar Mochot	Since 2022 election
HaHadashot 12	Midgam Research & Consulting	Since 2022 election
i24 News	Direct Polls	Since 26 June 2025
Israel Hayom	Kantar Institute	Since 4 December 2025
Kan 11	Kantar Institute	Since 2022 election
Maariv	Panels Politics	2022 election – 29 June 2023
Maariv	Lazar Research Institute	5 July 2023 – 10 August 2023
Maariv	Lazar Research Institute, Panel4All	Since 17 August 2023
Walla	Lazar Research Institute, Panel4All	Since 2022 election
Zman Yisrael	Yossi Tatika	Since 2022 election

Shlomo Filber is affiliated with Likud and its leader Benjamin Netanyahu. Filber is implicated in Case 4000 on charges of breach of trust; thus it may be advisable to approach opinion polls edited by him with caution.

== Seat projections ==
This section displays voting intention estimates referring to the next Knesset election. The figures listed are Knesset seat counts rather than percentages, unless otherwise stated.

=== Graphical summary ===
This graph shows the polling trends from the 2022 Israeli legislative election until the next election day using local regressions (LOESS). Scenario polls are not included here. For parties not crossing the electoral threshold (3.25%) in any given poll, the number of seats is calculated as a percentage of the 120 total seats.

Local regression of polls conducted
Interactive poll charts

=== Guide to the table ===
Polls are listed in reverse chronological order and using the dates when the survey fieldwork was done, as opposed to the date of publication. Where the fieldwork dates are unknown, the date of publication is given instead.

The parties which hold Knesset seats are listed in descending order by the number of seats they received in the 2022 election: Likud, Together (Yesh Atid competed on its own previously but will run with Bennett 2026 in this election), the Religious Zionist Party (which formed a technical bloc with Zehut this election) and Otzma Yehudit (which previously ran with RZP), Shas, United Torah Judaism (which consists of Agudat Yisrael, Homat Torat Yisrael and Degel HaTorah), Yisrael Beiteinu, Ra'am (which formed a technical bloc with Yoav Segalovitz this election), the Joint List (which previously ran separately as Hadash–Ta'al and Balad), followed by The Democrats (which won seats as Labor and merged with Meretz to form the new party).

The table also includes new parties that do not hold seats, specifically Yashar, The Reservists, Amcha Yisrael, and Haredi Public. Parties that are not polled on consistently are listed in footnotes, including Noam, which currently holds a seat.

Parties that fall below the electoral threshold of 3.25% are normally denoted by the percentage of votes that they received, shown in parentheses, e.g. (1.2%), rather than by the number of seats they would have received. If the publisher of a poll chooses to provide a figure for the number of seats a party would receive if the electoral threshold did not exist, this figure is shown in parentheses without a percentage sign, e.g. (1). If a poll has no information on a particular party, or states that it does not meet the electoral threshold without providing details, that party is instead marked by a dash.

The column headed Others contains figures for assorted smaller parties in cases where publishers provide these numbers. A slightly different convention is used here. If the publisher provides percentages for these parties, then the sum of these figures is shown, without parentheses. If the publisher provides projected seat numbers (disregarding the electoral threshold) then the sum of these figures is shown, in parentheses. In both cases, the breakdown by party is given in a footnote.

The party receiving the highest number of projected seats has its figure displayed in bold with the background shaded in the party's colour. In the case of a tie, the parties tying for the highest number of projected seats have their figures displayed in bold with the backgrounds shaded in their colours.

The 37th government parties and alliances (Likud, Religious Zionist Party, Otzma Yehudit, Shas, and United Torah Judaism) are highlighted. The sum of their projected seats is shown in the column headed "Gov." If that sum constitutes a majority of the Knesset (61 or more seats), it is highlighted and bolded.

The results of exit polls are highlighted in yellow, while the election results are highlighted in gray.

=== 2026 ===
Fieldwork date	Polling firm	Publisher	Sample size	Likud	Together	RZP- Zehut	Otzma	Shas	UTJ	Yisrael Beiteinu	Ra'am	Joint List	Dems	Yashar	Reserv.- NEP	Amcha Yisrael	Haredi Public	Others	Gov. (Note: This column shows the total for the 37th government parties. If a source includes any non-government party as a member of a Netanyahu-led bloc, the source's total for that bloc will differ from the figure shown in this column.)
27 Oct	**Election results**		5716673; 77.97%	**27**	12	6	7	6	7	7	8	11	8	21	(2.72%)	(1.68%)	(0.19%)	(0.67%)	53
27 Oct	Midgam R&C	HaHadashot 12	—N/a	**27**	12	6	6	7	6	7	7	12	9	21	—N/a	—N/a	—N/a	—N/a	52
27 Oct	Kantar	Kan 11	—N/a	**27**	13	6	6	6	6	8	7	11	9	21	—N/a	—N/a	—N/a	—N/a	51
27 Oct	MP+TM+SN+A	Channel 13	—N/a	**27**	13	6	6	6	6	7	7	11	9	22	—N/a	—N/a	—N/a	—N/a	51
27 Oct	Direct Polls	i24 News	—N/a	**27**	15	6	7	8	7	5	7	9	9	20	—N/a	—N/a	—N/a	—N/a	55
27 Oct	SF+ND	Channel 14	—N/a	**29**	11	7	7	7	9	8	4	11	7	20	—N/a	—N/a	—N/a	—N/a	59
23 Oct	From 23:59 local time on Friday 23 October until the close of polls on Tuesday 27 October, no new opinion polls may be published																		
23 Oct	MP+TM+SN+A	Channel 13	1875	19	14	8	8	7	8	8	7	9	10	**22**	(3.0%)	(3.1%)	(1.3%)	—N/a	50
22–23 Oct	Midgam R&C	HaHadashot 12	1018	21	15	6	8	8	7	8	5	9	10	**23**	(2.4%)	(2.5%)	(0.5%)	0.5% (Note: Noam at 0.5%)	50
22 Oct	Kantar	Israel Hayom	—N/a	21	14	6	8	8	7	7	5	9	8	**23**	4	—N/a	—N/a	—N/a	50
22 Oct	SF+ND	Channel 14	7937	**30**	11	7	8	9	8	5	6	8	8	20	(1.9%)	(1.5%)	(0.3%)	0.8% (Note: Noam at 0.6%, Ahi at 0.2%)	**62**
21–22 Oct	Yossi Tatika	Zman Yisrael	500	21	11	6	8	8	8	9	5	9	8	**23**	4	(3.0%)	—N/a	—N/a	51
19–22 Oct	LRI+P4A	Maariv	1048	19	15	7	7	8	7	8	5	9	10	**21**	4	(3.0%)	(0.9%)	1.0% (Note: Noam at 0.5%, Tzomet-Beit Yisrael at 0.5%)	48
21 Oct	MP+TM+SN+A	Channel 13	1084	19	14	8	7	7	8	8	6	9	10	**20**	4	(3.2%)	(1.2%)	—N/a	49
21 Oct	Midgam R&C	HaHadashot 12	505	19	15	6	7	8	7	8	5	9	9	**23**	(2.8%)	4	(0.3%)	0.3% (Note: Code Black at 0.3%)	47
21 Oct	SF+ND	Channel 14	1954	**30**	10	7	8	10	7	5	6	8	9	20	(2.2%)	(1.7%)	(0.3%)	0.8% (Note: Noam at 0.6%, Ahi at 0.2%)	**62**
20 Oct	Direct Polls	i24 News	521	**26**	12	7	9	8	8	7	6	8	9	20	(2.6%)	(3.1%)	(<1%)	<4% (Note: Ahi at <1%, Code Black at <1%, Israel First-Ale Yarok at <1%, and Noam at <1%.)	58
20 Oct	SF+ND	Channel 14	2116	**30**	9	7	8	9	8	6	6	8	9	20	(2.5%)	(1.9%)	(0.9%)	1.3% (Note: Noam at 0.9%, Ahi at 0.4%)	**62**
19 Oct	LRI+P4A	Walla	601	19	14	6	8	8	7	8	6	8	9	**23**	4	(2.9%)	—N/a	0.2% (Note: Noam at 0.2%)	48
20 Oct	Maagar Mochot	Channel 16	2026	18	15	6	9	6	7	7	5	9	9	**21**	4	4	(0.6%)	0.2% (Note: Other parties not specified)	46
19 Oct	MP+TM+SN+A	Channel 13	1016	18	14	7	7	7	7	8	6	9	9	**20**	4	4	—N/a	—N/a	46
19 Oct	SF+ND	Channel 14	454	**30**	10	7	7	10	8	6	5	8	10	19	(2.6%)	(2.2%)	(0.3%)	2.0% (Note: Noam at 1.5%, Ahi at 0.5%)	**62**
19 Oct	Blue & White withdraws from race																		

Fieldwork date	Polling firm	Publisher	Sample size	Likud	Together	RZP- Zehut	Otzma	Blue & White	Shas	UTJ	Yisrael Beiteinu	Ra'am	Joint List	Dems	Yashar	Reserv.- NEP	Amcha Yisrael	Haredi Public	Others	Gov.
19 Oct	Midgam R&C	HaHadashot 12	507	21	14	7	8	(1.4%)	8	7	8	5	9	9	**24**	(2.1%)	(2.8%)	(0.2%)	—N/a	51
18 Oct	Direct Polls	i24 News	525	**25**	13	6	10	(<1%)	8	8	6	6	8	9	21	(2.4%)	(2.9%)	(<1%)	<4% (Note: Ahi at <1%, Code Black at <1%, Israel First-Ale Yarok at <1%, and Noam at <1%.)	57
18 Oct	SF+ND	Channel 14	538	**29**	10	7	7	(0.9%)	10	8	6	6	7	8	22	(2.4%)	(2.4%)	(0.5%)	1.0% (Note: Noam at 0.8%, Ahi at 0.2%)	**61**
18 Oct	Kantar	Kan 11	554	21	12	7	8	—N/a	8	7	8	5	8	9	**23**	4	(3.1%)	—N/a	—N/a	51
16 Oct	Deadline for submission of surplus-vote agreements to the Central Elections Committee																			
14–15 Oct	LRI+P4A	Maariv	700	18	13	6	8	(1.1%)	7	8	8	6	8	9	**21**	4	4	(0.5%)	0.7% (Note: Noam at 0.5% Tzomet-Beit Yisrael at 0.2%)	47
14–15 Oct	Yossi Tatika	Zman Yisrael	500	20	11	6	7	(1.2%)	8	8	9	5	8	8	**26**	4	(2.8%)	—N/a	—N/a	49
14 Oct	MP+TM+SN+A	Channel 13	1018	18	12	6	8	(1.2%)	7	8	9	6	9	9	**20**	4	4	(1.1%)	—N/a	47
13 Oct	Direct Polls	i24 News	1210	**27**	13	6	9	(<1%)	7	8	7	6	7	9	21	(2.2%)	(3.1%)	(<1%)	<4% (Note: Ahi at <1%, Code Black at <1%, Israel First-Ale Yarok at <1%, and Noam at <1%.)	57
13 Oct	Maagar Mochot	Channel 16	2099	18	13	6	9	(1.2%)	7	8	7	5	8	9	**21**	5	4	(1.1%)	0.7% (Note: Other parties not specified)	48
12 Oct	LRI+P4A	Walla	601	20	13	6	8	(1.1%)	7	8	9	5	8	10	**22**	4	—N/a	(1.0%)	0.2% (Note: Noam at 0.2%)	49
12 Oct	SF+ND	Channel 14	538	**29**	7	7	7	(0.6%)	10	8	5	5	8	10	20	4	(2.9%)	(0.6%)	—N/a	**61**
12 Oct	Midgam R&C	HaHadashot 12	509	20	13	6	8	(0.9%)	8	7	9	5	8	9	**23**	4	(1.8%)	(0.1%)	0.5% (Note: Noam at 0.5%)	49
11 Oct	Kantar	Kan 11	553	20	12	5	9	—N/a	7	8	8	5	8	8	**22**	4	4	—N/a	—N/a	49
11 Oct	Shas and United Torah Judaism sign a surplus-vote agreement																			
7–8 Oct	LRI+P4A	Maariv	700	20	13	6	8	(1.9%)	7	7	9	5	7	9	**21**	4	4	(0.8%)	0.9% (Note: Noam at 0.6% Tzomet-Beit Yisrael at 0.3%)	48
7–8 Oct	Yossi Tatika	Zman Yisrael	500	20	13	5	6	(1.2%)	8	8	10	5	9	8	**24**	(3.2%)	4	—N/a	—N/a	47
7–8 Oct	Kantar	Israel Hayom	555	21	13	6	9	(1.2%)	7	8	8	5	8	8	**22**	5	(2.9%)	—N/a	—N/a	51
7 Oct	Direct Polls	i24 News	504	**26**	11	6	9	(<1%)	7	8	7	5	7	10	20	(2.3%)	4	(<1%)	<4% (Note: Ahi at <1%, Code Black at <1%, Israel First-Ale Yarok at <1%, and Noam at <1%.)	56
7 Oct	SF+ND	Channel 14	2175	**31**	8	6	8	(1.3%)	10	8	5	5	7	9	23	(1.8%)	(2.2%)	(0.4%)	1.0% (Note: Noam at 0.9% Ahi at 0.1%)	**63**
7 Oct	MP+TM+SN+A	Channel 13	1013	**20**	12	7	8	(0.8%)	7	8	8	6	9	10	**20**	(2.9%)	5	(1.1%)	—N/a	50
6 Oct	Likud and RZP-Zehut sign a surplus-vote agreement																			
5 Oct	Midgam R&C	HaHadashot 12	501	21	13	6	7	(0.5%)	7	8	9	5	8	9	**23**	4	(1.5%)	(0.6%)	—N/a	49
4 Oct	Kantar	Kan 11	553	21	12	6	8	(1.3%)	8	8	9	5	8	8	**23**	4	(2.6%)	(0.9%)	(1.3%)	51
2 Oct	The Supreme Court overturns the decision to disqualify Joint List, Ra'am and Ofer Cassif																			
2 Oct	Sami Abu Shehadeh submits his withdrawal to the Central Elections Committee after being advised to do so by the Supreme Court																			
1 Oct	Direct Polls	i24 News	504	**28**	9	5	8	—N/a	7	8	7	5	8	9	22	(1.81%)	4	—N/a	—N/a (Note: Ahi, Black Ink, Israel First and Noam are below the threshold)	56
1 Oct	SF+ND	Channel 14	2175	**32**	8	7	7	(0.4%)	10	8	6	5	7	9	21	(1.2%)	(1.7%)	(0.2%)	0.2% (Note: Noam at 0.1% Ahi at 0.1%)	**64**
30 Sep – 1 Oct	Yossi Tatika	Zman Yisrael	500	**21**	10	5	6	(1.4%)	9	8	10	5	8	8	**21**	5	4	—N/a	—N/a	49
30 Sep – 1 Oct	LRI+P4A	Maariv	602	19	13	5	9	(0.7%)	7	7	9	5	7	10	**21**	4	4	(0.6%)	0.7% (Note: Noam at 0.4% Tzomet-Beit Yisrael at 0.3%)	47
30 Sep	MP+TM+SN+A	Channel 13	1013	19	11	7	8	(0.9%)	7	8	9	5	9	11	**21**	(2.5%)	5	(1.3%)	—N/a	49
29 Sep	Maagar Mochot	Channel 16	550	19	14	6	8	(0.4%)	8	7	7	5	7	9	**21**	4	5	(0.6%)	0.8% (Note: Other parties not specified)	48
28 Sep	SF+ND	Channel 14	573	**31**	9	7	7	(0.6%)	10	8	6	5	7	9	21	(2.1%)	(1.6%)	(0.2%)	0.2% (Note: Noam at 0.2%)	**63**
27 Sep	Kantar	Kan 11	552	21	11	6	7	—N/a	7	7	9	5	7	9	**23**	4	4	—N/a	—N/a (Note: Noam is below the threshold)	48
24 Sep	Maagar Mochot	Channel 16	553	19	13	5	9	(1.0%)	8	7	8	5	7	8	**23**	4	4	(0.4%)	0.3% (Note: Other parties not specified)	48
24 Sep	Direct Polls	i24 News	537	**27**	9	6	8	(<1%)	7	8	7	6	7	9	22	(1.6%)	4	(<1%)	<3% (Note: Code Black at <1% Noam at <1% Israel First–Ale Yarok at <1%)	56
24 Sep	The Central Elections Committee decides not to disqualify The Democrats, Otzma Yehudit and Religious Zionism																			
23–24 Sep	Yossi Tatika	Zman Yisrael	500	21	12	4	6	—N/a	10	8	10	6	8	8	**23**	—N/a	4	—N/a	—N/a	49
23–24 Sep	LRI+P4A	Maariv	610	18	13	6	9	(1.3%)	6	6	9	5	7	11	**22**	4	4	(0.9%)	0.7% (Note: Noam at 0.7%)	45
23 Sep	SF+ND	Channel 14	647	**32**	7	7	6	(0.3%)	11	7	7	5	7	9	22	(2.2%)	(1.9%)	(0.5%)	0.1% (Note: Noam at 0.1%)	**63**
23 Sep	MP+TM+SN+A	Channel 13	1503	18	11	6	7	(<1.0%)	8	7	8	5	8	11	**22**	4	5	—N/a	—N/a	46
23 Sep	The Central Elections Committee disqualifies Ra'am and Joint List (alongside its candidates Ofer Cassif and Sami Abu Shehadeh), pending review by the Supreme Court																			
22 Sep	Midgam R&C	HaHadashot 12	501	20	13	5	6	(0.7%)	7	8	9	5	7	9	**23**	4	4	(0.3%)	0.1% (Note: Noam at 0.1% Israel First at 0%)	46
17 Sep	SF+ND	Channel 14	817	**31**	9	7	8	(0.4%)	10	8	7	5	7	8	20	(2.2%)	(2.6%)	(0.3%)	0.1% (Note: Noam at 0.1%)	**64**
17 Sep	Direct Polls	i24 News	519	**27**	9	6	7	(<1%)	7	8	8	5	7	10	21	(2.2%)	5	(<1%)	<1% (Note: Noam at <1%)	55
16–17 Sep	LRI+P4A	Maariv	600	18	13	6	8	(1.1%)	7	7	9	5	7	9	**23**	4	4	(0.6%)	1.8% (Note: Ahi at 0.8% Noam at 0.6% Tzomet-Beit Yisrael at 0.4%)	46
16–17 Sep	Kantar	Israel Hayom	551	20	13	6	8	(1.2%)	7	7	8	5	7	9	**22**	4	4	(0.8%)	0.9% (Note: Code Black at 0.5% Noam at 0.4%)	48
16–17 Sep	Yossi Tatika	Zman Yisrael	500	22	14	4	7	(2.0%)	9	9	9	6	8	8	**24**	(2.2%)	(3.0%)	—N/a	—N/a	51
16 Sep	Maagar Mochot	Channel 16	500	18	16	5	9	—N/a	9	7	7	5	6	9	**21**	4	4	—N/a	—N/a	48
15 Sep	MP+TM+SN+A	Channel 13	886	18	12	8	8	(0.8%)	7	7	8	6	8	10	**22**	(3.1%)	6	(1.8%)	—N/a	48
15 Sep	SF+ND	Channel 14	483	**30**	8	8	8	(0.4%)	10	8	6	5	7	9	21	(2.1%)	(2.3%)	(0.2%)	0.3% (Note: Noam at 0.3%)	**63**
14 Sep	Midgam R&C	HaHadashot 12	—N/a	20	13	5	6	(0.5%)	7	8	8	4	8	10	**23**	4	4	—N/a	—N/a	46
14 Sep	Kantar	Kan 11	—N/a	20	12	6	8	—N/a	7	7	8	5	7	8	**24**	4	4	—N/a	—N/a	48
12 Sep	Joint List and Ra'am sign a surplus-vote agreement																			
10 Sep	The following pairs of parties sign surplus-vote agreements: Yashar and The Democrats, Together and Yisrael Beiteinu																			
9–10 Sep	LRI+P4A	Maariv	601	19	14	5	8	(1.1%)	7	7	9	5	7	10	**25**	(3.0%)	4	(0.4%)	0.7% (Note: Noam at 0.7%)	46
9–10 Sep	Yossi Tatika	Zman Yisrael	500	**23**	15	4	6	(1.4%)	10	9	10	5	7	8	**23**	(2.8%)	(2.8%)	—N/a	—N/a	52
9 Sep	Maagar Mochot	Channel 16	—N/a	20	16	4	9	(1%)	9	7	7	5	7	9	**23**	(2%)	4	(0.7%)	—N/a	49
9 Sep	MP+TM+SN+A	Channel 13	1119	19	13	6	9	(1.1%)	7	8	8	6	8	10	**22**	(3.2%)	4	(1.1%)	—N/a	49
9 Sep	Direct Polls	i24 News	1054	**27**	10	6	8	(1.1%)	7	8	7	5	7	9	22	(1.4%)	4	(<1%)	<6% (Note: Code Black at <1% Noam at <1% Ahi at <1% El Hadgel at <1% HaKahal at <1% Israel First–Ale Yarok at <1%)	56
9 Sep	SF+ND	Channel 14	537	**31**	7	8	8	(0.2%)	10	7	7	6	6	8	22	(1.4%)	(2.1%)	(0.1%)	0.1% (Note: Noam at 0.1%)	**64**
9 Sep	LRI+P4A	Walla	506	21	14	5	7	(0.9%)	7	7	9	5	7	9	**25**	(2.8%)	4	(0.2%)	1.3% (Note: Ahi at 1.1% Noam at 0.2%)	47
9 Sep	Kantar	Kan 11	554	21	12	5	7	(0.8%)	7	8	7	5	7	9	**24**	4	4	(0.9%)	0.5% (Note: Israel First–Ale Yarok at 0.5% Noam at 0.0%)	48
9 Sep	Midgam R&C	HaHadashot 12	504	21	13	5	6	(1.4%)	7	8	9	4	7	10	**25**	(2.9%)	5	(1.0%)	0.5% (Note: Israel First–Ale Yarok 0.3% Noam 0.2%)	47
8 Sep	Final day of submission of candidate lists to the Central Elections Committee																			
7–8 Sep	LRI+P4A	Maariv	600	20	13	5	8	(1.3%)	7	7	9	5	7	10	**25**	4	(2.8%)	(0.4%)	0.6% (Note: Noam at 0.6%)	47
7 Sep	S.M.L.T.	—N/a	2185	**25**	9	8	9	4	10	7	7	5	7	9	20	(1.79%)	(2.08%)	(0.24%)	1.00% (Note: Noam at 0.35% El Hadgel at 0.34% Israel First at 0.30%)	59
7 Sep	SF+ND	Channel 14	1057	**30**	6	8	8	(0.4%)	10	7	6	5	8	10	22	(2.1%)	(3.0%)	(0.3%)	0.2% (Note: Noam at 0.2%)	**63**
7 Sep	Midgam R&C	HaHadashot 12	503	21	13	6	6	(1.0%)	7	8	8	4	7	11	**25**	(2.7%)	4	(1.2%)	0.4% (Note: Noam 0.3% A Place for Us All at 0.1% Israel First–Ale Yarok 0.0%)	48
7 Sep	First day of submission of candidate lists to the Central Elections Committee																			
6 Sep	Kantar	Kan 11	551	20	13	6	7	—N/a	7	8	7	6	7	8	**23**	4	4	—N/a	—N/a	48
6 Sep	Zionist Home leader Hili Tropper announces he is running with Yashar, dissolving his alliance with The Reservists, which then runs together with the New Economic Party (Note: Hebrew: המילואימניקים והכלכלית)																			
4 Sep	Unity withdraws from the election																			

Fieldwork date	Polling firm	Publisher	Sample size	Likud	Together	RZP	Zehut	Otzma	Blue & White	Shas	UTJ	Yisrael Beiteinu	Ra'am	Joint List	Dems	Yashar	Zionist Home	Unity	Amcha Yisrael	Others	Gov.
3–4 Sep	LRI+P4A	Maariv	600	20	15	5		8	(0.7%)	7	7	9	5	7	10	**23**	(2.1%)	(1.1%)	4	1.9% (Note: NEP at 1.7% A Place for Us All at 0.7% Haredi Public at 0.4%)	47
3 Sep	SF+ND	Channel 14	865	**31**	9	7		7	(1.2%)	10	8	6	5	7	8	22	(1.3%)	(0.1%)	(2.7%)	0.3% (Note: Noam at 0.3%)	**63**
3 Sep	Likud MK Tally Gotliv announces she is running with Otzma Yehudit																				
2–3 Sep	Kantar	Israel Hayom	555	21	13	6		7	(1.7%)	7	8	9	5	7	9	**24**	(2.7%)	(0.7%)	4	—N/a	49
2–3 Sep	Yossi Tatika	Zman Yisrael	500	**22**	15	5		6	(1.4%)	9	8	10	5	6	8	**22**	4	(0.2%)	(2.4%)	—N/a	50
2 Sep	Maagar Mochot	Channel 16	552	19	18	5		9	(1%)	9	7	7	4	7	10	**20**	(2%)	(1%)	5	3% (Note: NEP at 2% Haredi Public at 1%)	49
2 Sep	MP+TM+SN+A	Channel 13	940	21	12	6		7	(1.2%)	7	8	8	5	9	11	**22**	(2.2%)	(0.6%)	4	0.8% (Note: Haredi Public at 0.3% A Place for Us All at 0.3% NEP at 0.2%)	49
2 Sep	Direct Polls	i24 News	522	**27**	9	6		7	(<1%)	7	8	8	5	7	10	23	(<1%)	(<1%)	5	<8% (Note: Ahi at <1% El Hadgel at <1% NEP at <1% Haredi Public at <1% HaKahal at <1% Israel First at <1% Noam at <1% Code Black at <1%)	55
2 Sep	LRI+P4A	Walla	500	22	15	5		7	(0.7%)	7	8	9	5	8	10	**24**	(3.0%)	(0.7%)	(2.3%)	3.1% (Note: NEP at 2.0% A Place for Us All at 0.5% Haredi Public at 0.4% Israel First at 0.2%)	49
1 Sep	The Religious Zionist Party and Zehut agree to run together as a technical bloc																				
31 Aug	Former Yesh Atid MK Yoav Segalovitz announces he will run with Ra'am as a technical bloc																				
31 Aug	Midgam R&C	HaHadashot 12	506	23	15	(2.6%)	(2.1%)	8	(0.9%)	7	8	9	4	7	11	**24**	(2.6%)	(0.5%)	4	2.2% (Note: NEP at 1.0% Haredi Public at 1.2%)	46
30 Aug	SF+ND	Channel 14	666	**31**	6	4	(2.3%)	7	(0.5%)	10	7	7	5	7	8	24	(0.9%)	(0.6%)	4	2.3% (Note: Noam at 0.3%)	59
30 Aug	Kantar	Kan 11	552	21	14	5	—N/a	7	(1.5%)	7	8	8	5	8	9	**24**	(2.4%)	(0.7%)	4	—N/a	48
30 Aug	Kantar	Kan 11	552	21	?	7		7	—N/a	?	?	?	5	8	?	**24**	—N/a	—N/a	(3.0%)	—N/a	48
27 Aug	SF+ND	Channel 14	981	**31**	7	4	(1.7%)	7	(0.4%)	10	7	6	5	7	9	23	(1.1%)	(0.3%)	4	0.3% (Note: Noam at 0.3%)	59
26–27 Aug	Yossi Tatika	Zman Yisrael	500	22	14	(2.8%)	—N/a	6	(2.4%)	9	8	10	5	6	8	**26**	(2.4%)	(0.8%)	6	—N/a	45
26–27 Aug	LRI+P4A	Maariv	506	20	15	(3.0%)	—N/a	8	(0.6%)	7	8	9	5	8	10	**25**	(2.0%)	(0.6%)	5	1.9% (Note: NEP at 1.5% Fiery Youth at 0.4%)	43
26 Aug	Maagar Mochot	Channel 16	552	**21**	16	(3)	(1)	9	(1)	9	7	8	4	7	11	**21**	(3)	(2)	7	(1) (Note: NEP at 1)	46
26 Aug	MP+TM+SN+A	Channel 13	1407	19	13	5	(1.1%)	8	(1.8%)	8	8	9	5	10	11	**24**	(2.0%)	(0.8%)	(2.2%)	—N/a	48
26 Aug	Direct Polls	i24 News	532	**26**	8	4	(1.3%)	6	(<1%)	8	7	8	6	6	10	23	(<1%)	(<1%)	8	>1.1% (Note: NEP at 1.1% Israel First at <1% Noam at <1%)	51
26 Aug	LRI+P4A	Walla	500	21	15	(2.6%)	—N/a	8	(1.2%)	7	7	9	5	7	10	**25**	(2.1%)	(0.3%)	6	1.5% (Note: NEP at 1.2% Israel First at 0.3%)	43
25 Aug	Ofer Winter forms a new political party, called Amcha Yisrael																				

Fieldwork date	Polling firm	Publisher	Sample size	Likud	Together	RZP	Otzma	Blue & White	Shas	UTJ	Yisrael Beiteinu	Ra'am	Joint List		Dems	Yashar	Zionist Home	Unity	Winter party	Others	Gov.
Fieldwork date	Polling firm	Publisher	Sample size	Likud	Together	RZP	Otzma	Blue & White	Shas	UTJ	Yisrael Beiteinu	Ra'am	Hadash –Ta'al	Balad	Dems	Yashar	Zionist Home	Unity	Winter party	Others	Gov.
24 Aug	Midgam R&C	HaHadashot 12	500	22	15	4	9	(0.4%)	7	8	9	4	7		11	**24**	(2.9%)	(0.8%)	—N/a	—N/a	50
24 Aug	Midgam R&C	HaHadashot 12	500	21	16	(2.4%)	9	(0.4%)	7	8	9	4	7		11	**24**	(2.8%)	(0.8%)	4	—N/a	45
24 Aug	SF+ND	Channel 14	486	**32**	7	5	8	(1.0%)	10	8	7	5	5		9	24	(1.3%)	(0.2%)	(2.1%)	1.7% (Note: Zehut at 1.7%)	**63**
23 Aug	Kantar	Kan 11	552	22	14	5	9	(1.8%)	7	8	9	5	7		10	**24**	(2.8%)	(1.6%)	(2.5%)	—N/a	51
22 Aug	Ra'am conducts a primary to select candidates for the election																				
19–20 Aug	Kantar	Israel Hayom	553	22	13	5	9	(2.1%)	7	8	10	5	8		10	**23**	(2.5%)	(1.7%)	—N/a	—N/a	51
19–20 Aug	Kantar	Israel Hayom	553	21	13	4	7	(1.3%)	7	8	10	5	8		10	**23**	(1.5%)	(1.2%)	4	—N/a	47
19–20 Aug	Yossi Tatika	Zman Yisrael	500	21	15	6	7	(2.4%)	9	8	11	5	7		8	**23**	(3.0%)	(0.8%)	—N/a	—N/a	51
19–20 Aug	LRI+P4A	Maariv	501	20	14	5	9	(1.1%)	7	8	10	5	6	(1.2%)	10	**26**	(2.9%)	(1.1%)	(1.5%)	1.7% (Note: NEP at 1.7%)	49
19 Aug	Hadash, Ta'al and Balad re-form the Joint List																				
19 Aug	MP+TM+SN+A	Channel 13	1247	23	13	5	8	(1.8%)	7	8	9	5	5	(1.0%)	11	**26**	(1.6%)	(1.2%)	—N/a	—N/a	51
19 Aug	Maagar Mochot	Channel 16	551	22	16	4	9	—N/a	9	7	9	4	5	—N/a	10	**25**	—N/a	—N/a	—N/a	—N/a (Note: Zehut and NEP are below the threshold)	51
18–19 Aug	Kantar	Kan 11	558	23	14	5	9	(1.4%)	7	8	9	5	6	(2.1%)	10	**24**	(2.9%)	(1.6%)	—N/a	—N/a	52
18 Aug	SF+ND	Channel 14	636	**32**	6	6	8	(0.4%)	10	7	7	6	5	(2.1%)	9	24	(1.2%)	(0.1%)	(0.9%)	1.2% (Note: Zehut at 1.2%)	**63**
18 Aug	Direct Polls	i24 News	522	**31**	9	5	6	(<1%)	8	8	8	5	5	(1.4%)	11	24	(1.1%)	(<1%)	—N/a	>3.3% (Note: Zehut at 2.1% NEP at 1.2% Noam at <1%)	58
17 Aug	Likud conducts a primary to select candidates for the election																				
17 Aug	Midgam R&C	HaHadashot 12	501	22	15	5	8	(1.4%)	7	8	10	5	5	(1.8%)	11	**24**	(1.5%)	(1.7%)	—N/a	—N/a	50
17 Aug	Midgam R&C	HaHadashot 12	501	24	16	(2.7%)	8	(1.5%)	7	8	10	5	5	(1.8%)	11	**26**	(1.5%)	(1.1%)	(2.5%)	—N/a	50
16 Aug	Kantar	Kan 11	1103	**23**	14	4	10	(1.4%)	7	8	10	5	6	(1.9%)	10	**23**	(3.0%)	(1.3%)	—N/a	—N/a	52
13 Aug	Direct Polls	i24 News	512	**30**	8	5	7	(<1%)	8	9	9	5	6	(1.1%)	10	23	(2.0%)	(1.1%)	—N/a	>3.4% (Note: Zehut at 2.2% NEP at 1.2% Noam at <1%)	59
12–13 Aug	LRI+P4A	Maariv	506	21	14	4	8	(1.9%)	7	8	10	5	6	(1.5%)	10	**23**	4	(1.9%)	—N/a	3.1% (Note: NEP at 2.5% Israel First at 0.6%)	48
12–13 Aug	Yossi Tatika	Zman Yisrael	500	21	13	6	7	(2.0%)	8	8	11	6	6		9	**25**	(3.0%)	(1.0%)	—N/a	—N/a	50
12 Aug	MP+TM+SN+A	Channel 13	1240	21	12	5	8	(1.0%)	7	8	10	5	6	(1.2%)	11	**23**	4	(1.0%)	—N/a	—N/a	49
10 Aug	Maagar Mochot	Channel 16	—N/a	**22**	16	4	9	(2.2%)	10	7	9	4	5	(3.0%)	12	**22**	(2.6%)	(2.7%)	—N/a	1.5% (Note: Zehut at 1.5%)	51
10 Aug	Midgam R&C	HaHadashot 12	502	22	15	5	8	(0.8%)	7	8	10	5	5	(1.6%)	11	**24**	(2.7%)	(1.3%)	—N/a	—N/a	50
9 Aug	Ta'al withdraws from Joint List negotiations after being given the fewest seats on the proposed list																				
9 Aug	SF+ND	Channel 14	741	**33**	7	6	6	(0.4%)	10	7	8	5	5	(2.3%)	10	23	(1.2%)	(0.9%)	(0.6%)	1.3% (Note: Zehut at 1.3%)	**62**
9 Aug	Kantar	Kan 11	551	**24**	13	5	8	(1.3%)	8	8	10	6	5	(2.1%)	10	23	(3.0%)	(1.9%)	—N/a	—N/a	53
9 Aug	Kantar	Kan 11	551	**24**	13	5	8	(1.4%) (Note: with Dedi Simchi)	8	8	10	6	5	(1.5%)	10	23	(2.8%)	(1.7%)	(3.0%)	—N/a	53
6 Aug	Gilad Erdan and Yuli Edelstein form a new political party, named Unity (Note: Hebrew: האחדות)																				
6 Aug	Direct Polls	i24 News	535	**28**	7	5	8	(1.1%)	8	9	8	5	8		10	23	(2.1%)	(1.6%)	—N/a	>1.5% (Note: Zehut at 1.5% NEP at <1% Noam at <1%)	58

Fieldwork date	Polling firm	Publisher	Sample size	Likud	Together	RZP	Otzma	Blue & White	Shas	UTJ	Yisrael Beiteinu	Ra'am	Joint List		Dems	Yashar	Zionist Home	Others	Gov.
Fieldwork date	Polling firm	Publisher	Sample size	Likud	Together	RZP	Otzma	Blue & White	Shas	UTJ	Yisrael Beiteinu	Ra'am	Hadash –Ta'al	Balad	Dems	Yashar	Zionist Home	Others	Gov.
6 Aug	Kantar	Israel Hayom	552	**23**	13	4	9	(0.7%)	7	8	9	6	5	(1.6%)	10	**23**	4	—N/a	51
5–6 Aug	LRI+P4A	Maariv	502	22	15	4	8	(1.2%)	7	8	10	5	5	(1.4%)	9	**23**	4	—N/a	49
5–6 Aug	Yossi Tatika	Zman Yisrael	500	21	15	6	8	—N/a	8	8	11	6	6		8	**23**	—N/a	—N/a	51
5 Aug	MP+TM+SN+A	Channel 13	961	22	13	5	9	(1.4%)	7	8	11	5	6	(1.2%)	11	**23**	(3.0%)	—N/a	51
4 Aug	SF+ND	Channel 14	588	**31**	8	6	6	(0.5%)	11	8	8	5	5	(2.9%)	10	22	(1.9%)	3.2% (Note: Zehut at 1.3% Ofer Winter at 1.2% Gilad Erdan at 0.7%)	**62**
4 Aug	Maagar Mochot	Channel 16	—N/a	21	14	4	9	—N/a	9	8	9	4	5	—N/a	11	**22**	4	—N/a	51
3 Aug	Midgam R&C	HaHadashot 12	503	**23**	14	5	7	(1.4%)	7	8	9	5	5	(1.0%)	10	**23**	4	—N/a	50
2 Aug	Kantar	Kan 11	551	**23**	13	4	9	(1.4%)	8	8	9	5	6	(2.2%)	8	**23**	4	—N/a	52
29–30 Jul	LRI+P4A	Maariv	501	22	15	5	7	(1.2%)	7	8	10	5	5	(1.8%)	9	**23**	4	—N/a	49
29–30 Jul	Yossi Tatika	Zman Yisrael	500	20	13	6	7	4	8	8	10	5	6		8	**21**	4	—N/a	49
29 Jul	MP+TM+SN+A	Channel 13	956	**23**	13	4	8	(2.3%)	7	9	10	5	4	(1.8%)	9	**23**	5	—N/a	51
29 Jul	SF+ND	Channel 14	539	**32**	7	5	7	(1.1%)	10	8	8	5	6	(2.1%)	10	22	(2.1%)	1.3% (Note: Zehut at 1.3%)	**62**
27 Jul	Midgam R&C	HaHadashot 12	509	22	14	4	8	(1.6%)	8	8	9	5	5	(1.2%)	10	**23**	4	—N/a	50
27 Jul	Midgam R&C	HaHadashot 12	509	21	14	4	9	—N/a	8	8	9	4	6		10	**23**	4	—N/a	50
27 Jul	Direct Polls	i24 News	525	**29**	9	5	8	—N/a	9	8	9	5	7		10	21	—N/a	—N/a (Note: Zehut and NEP are below the threshold)	59
26 Jul	Kantar	Kan 11	551	**22**	14	5	9	(2.6%)	8	8	9	5	5	(2.1%)	10	21	4	—N/a	52
26 Jul	SF+ND	Channel 14	878	**32**	7	6	8	(0.9%)	10	7	6	5	5	(1.9%)	12	23	(2.1%)	1.9% (Note: Zehut at 1.9%)	**62**
23 Jul	Kantar	Israel Hayom	—N/a	**23**	14	5	9	(2.4%)	8	8	9	5	5	(2.0%)	10	**23**	(3.0%)	—N/a	53
22–23 Jul	LRI+P4A	Maariv	500	20	17	5	8	(1.6%)	8	8	10	5	5	(1.7%)	11	**23**	(2.9%)	—N/a	49
22–23 Jul	Yossi Tatika	Zman Yisrael	500	21	13	5	8	(2.0%)	9	8	10	5	6		10	**25**	(2.6%)	—N/a	51
21 Jul	MP+TM+SN+A	Channel 13	988	**21**	14	5	7	(1.0%)	8	8	10	5	6	(1.9%)	11	**21**	4	0.5% (Note: A Place for Us All at 0.5%)	50
20 Jul	The Democrats conduct a primary to select candidates for the election																		
20 Jul	Midgam R&C	HaHadashot 12	507	23	15	4	8	(1.3%)	8	8	9	5	5	(1.7%)	11	**24**	(2.7%)	—N/a	51
19 Jul	Kantar	Kan 11	551	21	15	4	10	(2.2%)	8	8	9	5	5	(1.9%)	9	**22**	4	—N/a	51
17 Jul	The Knesset approves its dissolution																		
17 Jul	Lazar	Maariv	500	**22**	16	4	7	(1.7%)	7	8	9	5	5	(2.0%)	11	**22**	4	—N/a	48
16 Jul	SF+ND	Channel 14	—N/a	**32**	8	6	7	(0.9%)	10	8	7	5	5	(2.1%)	11	21	(2.5%)	1.5% (Note: Zehut at 1.5%)	**63**
16 Jul	Direct Polls	i24 News	550	**28**	9	6	7	(1.9%)	9	8	8	5	7		11	22	(2.1%)	2.8% (Note: Zehut at 2.0% NEP at 0.8%)	58
15–16 Jul	Yossi Tatika	Zman Yisrael	500	21	15	5	7	4	9	8	10	4	6		8	**23**	(2.4%)	—N/a	50
15 Jul	MP+TM+SN+A	Channel 13	—N/a	**22**	15	6	7	(0.8%)	7	8	10	4	5	(2.0%)	11	21	4	0.8% (Note: A Place for Us All at 0.8%)	50
13 Jul	Midgam R&C	HaHadashot 12	509	22	16	5	8	(1.4%)	8	8	10	5	5	(0.9%)	10	**23**	(2.9%)	—N/a	51
12 Jul	Kantar	Kan 11	551	23	15	5	8	(2.7%)	8	8	10	5	5	(2.0%)	9	**24**	(3.1%)	—N/a	52
9 Jul	Kantar	Israel Hayom	—N/a	**24**	14	4	8	(2.1%)	8	9	8	5	5	(2.2%)	8	23	4	—N/a	53
9 Jul	SF+ND	Channel 14	752	**33**	8	5	7	(0.8%)	10	8	8	5	5		10	21	(1.6%)	1.8% (Note: Zehut at 1.8%)	**63**
9 Jul	Direct Polls	i24 News	527	**29**	9	5	8	—N/a	9	8	9	5	7		10	21	—N/a	—N/a (Note: Zehut and NEP are below the threshold)	59
8–9 Jul	LRI+P4A	Maariv	500	21	18	4	8	(1.4%)	8	8	10	5	6	(1.8%)	10	**22**	(2.9%)	—N/a	49
8 Jul	MP+TM+SN+A	Channel 13	—N/a	22	15	5	8	(2.1%)	8	8	10	5	6	—N/a	10	**23**	(2.2%)	—N/a	51
7 Jul	Yoaz Hendel of The Reservists runs jointly with Hili Tropper under the eventual name "Zionist Home – The Reservists"																		

Fieldwork date	Polling firm	Publisher	Sample size	Likud	Together	RZP	Otzma	Blue & White	Shas	UTJ	Yisrael Beiteinu	Joint List (Note: Since 10 June without Ra'am)			Dems	Yashar	Reserv.	Others	Gov.
Fieldwork date	Polling firm	Publisher	Sample size	Likud	Together	RZP	Otzma	Blue & White	Shas	UTJ	Yisrael Beiteinu	Ra'am	Hadash –Ta'al	Balad	Dems	Yashar	Reserv.	Others	Gov.
6 Jul	Midgam R&C	HaHadashot 12	503	**23**	16	4	9	(1.0%)	8	8	9	4	6	(0.7%)	10	**23**	(1.0%)	—N/a	52
5 Jul	Kantar	Kan 11	553	**23**	16	5	9	(1.9%)	8	8	9	4	6	—N/a	9	**23**	(2.3%)	—N/a	53
2 Jul	SF+ND	Channel 14	—N/a	**33**	9	5	7	(1.9%)	11	7	8	5	6		9	20	—N/a	—N/a	**63**
1–2 Jul	LRI+P4A	Maariv	606	**21**	19	5	8	(0.8%)	8	8	10	5	6	(1.6%)	10	20	(1.4%)	—N/a	50
1–2 Jul	Yossi Tatika	Zman Yisrael	500	22	16	5	8	—N/a	10	8	11	4	5	—N/a	8	**23**	—N/a	—N/a	53
1 Jul	MP+TM+SN+A`	Channel 13	1108	**21**	17	5	8	(1.8%)	9	8	10	5	6	(1.3%)	11	20	(1.4%)	—N/a	51
30 Jun	Direct Polls	i24 News	—N/a	**29**	11	4	8	—N/a	9	8	9	5	7		11	19	—N/a	—N/a (Note: Zehut and NEP are below the threshold)	58
29 Jun	Midgam R&C	HaHadashot 12	—N/a	**24**	17	4	8	(2.5%)	9	7	9	5	5	(1.4%)	10	22	(2.2%)	—N/a	52
25 Jun	Kantar	Israel Hayom	—N/a	**24**	16	4	9	(1.8%)	8	8	9	4	7	(1.7%)	10	21	(2.7%)	—N/a	53
25 Jun	Midgam R&C	HaHadashot 12	504	**23**	18	4	9	(1.8%)	9	7	9	4	6	(1.7%)	10	21	(1.6%)	—N/a	52
25 Jun	SF+ND	Channel 14	654	**33**	9	4	7	(1.8%)	11	8	9	5	5		9	20	—N/a	—N/a	**63**
25 Jun	Direct Polls	i24 News	530	**27**	11	5	8	(1.2%)	9	8	10	5	7		10	20	(1.7%)	3.8% (Note: Zehut at 2.1% NEP at 1.7%)	57
24–25 Jun	LRI+P4A	Maariv	500	**22**	18	4	9	(1.7%)	8	7	11	4	6	(1.6%)	10	21	(1.2%)	—N/a	50
24–25 Jun	Yossi Tatika	Zman Yisrael	500	21	17	4	8	4	10	7	11	4	4	—N/a	7	**23**	—N/a	—N/a	50
24 Jun	MP+TM+SN+A	Channel 13	—N/a	**23**	15	5	9	(1.8%)	8	8	12	4	6	(1.5%)	10	20	(1.3%)	—N/a	53
24 Jun	Kantar	Kan 11	553	**24**	16	5	9	(2.2%)	8	7	10	4	6	(1.4%)	9	22	(2.4%)	—N/a	53
18 Jun	Midgam R&C	HaHadashot 12	—N/a	**22**	19	4	9	(1.9%)	9	7	9	5	5	(1.7%)	10	21	(1.9%)	0.2% (Note: A Place for Us All at 0.2%)	51
18 Jun	SF+ND	Channel 14	1552	**33**	10	4	7	(1.8%)	10	8	8	5	6		9	20	—N/a	—N/a	**62**
17–18 Jun	LRI+P4A	Maariv	501	**21**	20	4	8	(1.7%)	9	7	10	4	6	(1.8%)	10	**21**	(1.2%)	2.1% (Note: NEP at 2.1%)	49
17–18 Jun	Yossi Tatika	Zman Yisrael	500	**23**	19	—N/a	9	—N/a	10	8	10	5	5	—N/a	8	**23**	—N/a	—N/a	50
17 Jun	MP+TM+SN+A	Channel 13	—N/a	**22**	17	4	8	(2.0%)	9	8	11	4	6	(2.4%)	11	20	(3.0%)	—N/a	51
17 Jun	The Islamabad Memorandum is signed, which aims to end the 2026 Iran war																		
16 Jun	Kantar	Kan 11	555	**23**	17	4	9	(1.6%)	9	7	10	4	7	(1.5%)	9	21	(2.6%)	—N/a	52
16 Jun	Direct Polls	i24 News	—N/a	**28**	12	4	9	—N/a	9	8	9	5	7		11	18	—N/a	—N/a	58
11 Jun	Midgam R&C	HaHadashot 12	501	**22**	20	4	9	(0.7%)	9	7	8	5	5	(1.1%)	11	20	(1.6%)	—N/a	51
11 Jun	Kantar	Israel Hayom	—N/a	**24**	19	4	9	(2.2%)	9	7	9	4	6	(1.8%)	9	20	(2.5%)	—N/a	53
11 Jun	Kantar	Israel Hayom	—N/a	**24**	19	4	9	(2.0%)	9	7	9	4	6	(1.8%)	9	20	(2.3%)	4.6% (Note: NEP at 2.2% Zehut at 1.5% The Fourth Quarter at 0.5% El Dagel at 0.4%)	53
11 Jun	SF+ND	Channel 14	771	**33**	13	5	8	(0.8%)	10	7	8	5	6		9	16	—N/a	—N/a	**63**
10–11 Jun	Yossi Tatika	Zman Yisrael	500	**24**	21	—N/a	8	—N/a	10	8	10	5	5	—N/a	8	21	—N/a	—N/a	50
10–11 Jun	LRI+P4A	Maariv	500	**22**	21	4	9	(1.9%)	8	7	9	4	6	(2.0%)	10	17	(1.7%)	—N/a	50
10 Jun	Hadash–Ta'al and Balad commit to re-form the Joint List and end negotiations with Ra'am																		
5 Jun	SF+ND	Channel 14	—N/a	**32**	14	5	9	(1.3%)	10	7	8	5	5	(2.0%)	9	16	—N/a	—N/a	**63**
4 Jun	Kantar	Kan 11	551	**24**	23	4	10	(2.3%)	8	7	8	4	6	(1.5%)	9	17	(2.1%)	—N/a	53
4 Jun	Midgam R&C	HaHadashot 12	505	**23**	21	4	8	(1.8%)	9	7	9	5	5	(0.8%)	10	19	(1.3%)	—N/a	51
4 Jun	Yossi Tatika	Zman Yisrael	500	**23**	21	4	6	4	9	8	10	4	4	—N/a	8	19	—N/a	—N/a	50
3–4 Jun	LRI+P4A	Maariv	500	**25**	23	(2.6%)	9	(2.2%)	9	7	10	4	6	(1.8%)	10	17	(1.7%)	—N/a	50
3 Jun	Direct Polls	i24 News	515	**30**	14	5	8	(1.4%)	9	8	9	6	5	(2.5%)	10	16	(0.8%)	—N/a	60
28 May	Midgam R&C	HaHadashot 12	504	**23**	22	4	8	(1.8%)	8	8	9	5	5	(1.0%)	11	17	(0.7%)	—N/a	51
28 May	Yossi Tatika	Zman Yisrael	500	**24**	22	4	6	—N/a	10	8	10	5	5	—N/a	8	18	—N/a	—N/a	52
28 May	Yossi Tatika	Zman Yisrael	500	**23**	22	4	6	—N/a	10	8	10	13			7	17	—N/a	—N/a	51
28 May	SF+ND	Channel 14	615	**33**	15	5	7	(1.2%)	11	7	8	5	5	(2.1%)	9	15	—N/a	—N/a	**63**
27 May	Kantar	Israel Hayom	—N/a	**25**	22	4	8	(2.2%)	9	7	9	5	5	(1.9%)	9	17	(2.5%)	—N/a	53
25 May	MM+SN	Channel 13	—N/a	**25**	23	4	10	—N/a	10	7	8	4	6	—N/a	9	14	—N/a	—N/a	56
25 May	MM+SN	Channel 13	—N/a	**23**	21	4	?	—N/a	?	?	?	16			?	?	—N/a	—N/a	53
21 May	LRI+P4A	Maariv	—N/a	24	**25**	4	8	—N/a	8	7	9	5	5	—N/a	10	15	—N/a	—N/a	51
20 May	Midgam R&C	HaHadashot 12	501	**25**	23	4	7	(1.4%)	9	8	8	5	5	(1.4%)	10	16	(2.4%)	—N/a	53
20 May	Kantar	Kan 11	551	**27**	23	—N/a	9	—N/a	9	8	8	5	5	—N/a	10	16	—N/a	—N/a	53
20 May	Kantar	Kan 11	551	**27**	22	—N/a	9	—N/a	9	8	8	13			9	15	—N/a	—N/a	53
20 May	Yossi Tatika	Zman Yisrael	500	**24**	23	4	6	4	9	8	9	5	4	—N/a	8	16	—N/a	—N/a	51
19–20 May	LRI+P4A	Maariv	500	24	**25**	4	8	(1.5%)	8	7	9	5	5	(1.5%)	10	15	(1.4%)	—N/a	51
19 May	Direct Polls	i24 News	546	**30**	15	4	8	(<1%)	10	8	8	6	5	(1.8%)	9	17	(<1%)	—N/a	60
16 May	Former Hadash MK Yousef Jabareen is chosen to lead the party's electoral list																		
14 May	Midgam R&C	HaHadashot 12	506	**26**	24	(2.8%)	9	(2.7%)	9	8	9	5	5	(1.9%)	10	15	(1.0%)	—N/a	52
14 May	Yossi Tatika	Zman Yisrael	500	**24**	**24**	4	8	—N/a	9	8	10	6	4	—N/a	8	15	—N/a	—N/a	53
14 May	SF+ND	Channel 14	436	**33**	16	5	8	(2.3%)	10	7	7	6	5	(2.1%)	9	14	—N/a	—N/a	**63**
13 May	The coalition and opposition submit Knesset dissolution bills, aiming to bring the election date forward																		
13 May	MM+SN	Channel 13	—N/a	25	**26**	4	10	—N/a	10	7	7	5	5	—N/a	9	12	—N/a	—N/a	56
13 May	Kantar	Israel Hayom	—N/a	**26**	24	(2.9%)	9	(2.7%)	9	7	8	5	6	(1.8%)	10	16	(3.0%)	—N/a	51
12 May	Kantar	Kan 11	557	**26**	25	—N/a	9	—N/a	9	7	9	5	5	—N/a	10	15	—N/a	—N/a	51
12–13 May	LRI+P4A	Maariv	502	25	**26**	(2.1%)	8	(2.1%)	9	7	9	5	5	(1.4%)	10	16	(2.6%)	—N/a	49
7 May	Midgam R&C	HaHadashot 12	503	**25**	**25**	(2.9%)	9	(1.5%)	9	8	9	5	5	(0.8%)	11	14	(1.0%)	—N/a	51
7 May	SF+ND	Channel 14	721	**34**	16	5	8	(1.8%)	10	8	8	5	5	(2.1%)	8	13	—N/a	—N/a	**65**
6–7 May	Yossi Tatika	Zman Yisrael	500	**26**	**26**	—N/a	7	4	9	8	9	5	4	—N/a	8	14	—N/a	—N/a	50
6–7 May	LRI+P4A	Maariv	503	**26**	**26**	(2.5%)	9	(1.9%)	8	7	9	5	5	(1.8%)	10	15	(2.6%)	—N/a	50
30 Apr	Kantar	Israel Hayom	—N/a	**28**	23	(2.7%)	9	(1.6%)	8	7	9	5	6	(1.9%)	9	16	(2.6%)	—N/a	52
29–30 Apr	Yossi Tatika	Zman Yisrael	500	26	**28**	—N/a	7	—N/a	9	8	10	5	4	—N/a	8	15	—N/a	—N/a	50
29–30 Apr	LRI+P4A	Maariv	501	26	**28**	(1.5%)	9	(1.4%)	8	7	8	5	5	(1.4%)	10	14	(2.8%)	1.2% (Note: Tzomet at 1.2%)	50
27 Apr	MM+SN	Channel 13	—N/a	**26**	**26**	4	10	(1.6%)	10	7	6	5	6	(2.1%)	8	12	(2.5%)	—N/a	57
27 Apr	Kantar	Kan 11	555	**27**	24	(2.0%)	9	(2.6%)	9	7	8	5	5	(2.0%)	11	15	(2.3%)	—N/a	52
27 Apr	Midgam R&C	HaHadashot 12	501	25	**26**	(2.9%)	9	(1.9%)	9	7	9	5	5	(1.8%)	10	15	(1.9%)	—N/a	50
27 Apr	LRI+P4A	Walla	500	**28**	27	—N/a	8	—N/a	8	7	8	5	5	—N/a	9	15	—N/a	—N/a	51
26–27 Apr	Direct Polls	i24 News	578	**33**	24	4	6	—N/a	11	8	6	7	4	—N/a	9	8	—N/a	—N/a	**62**
26 Apr	Filber	Channel 14	932	**34**	20	4	7	(0.7%)	11	8	8	11			8	9	—N/a	—N/a	**64**
26 Apr	Bennett 2026 and Yesh Atid form the Together alliance under Bennett's leadership																		

Fieldwork date	Polling firm	Publisher	Sample size	Likud	Yesh Atid	RZP	Otzma	Blue & White	Shas	UTJ	Yisrael Beiteinu	Joint List			Dems	Bennett 2026	Yashar	Reserv.	Others	Gov.
Fieldwork date	Polling firm	Publisher	Sample size	Likud	Yesh Atid	RZP	Otzma	Blue & White	Shas	UTJ	Yisrael Beiteinu	Ra'am	Hadash –Ta'al	Balad	Dems	Bennett 2026	Yashar	Reserv.	Others	Gov.
23–24 Apr	LRI+P4A	Maariv	502	24	7	(2.8%)	9	(1.7%)	9	7	9	5	5	(1.4%)	9	**24**	12	(2.0%)	—N/a	49
23 Apr	Midgam R&C	HaHadashot 12	—N/a	25	7	(2.7%)	9	(0.8%)	9	7	8	5	5	(0.4%)	10	21	14	(1.3%)	—N/a	50
23 Apr	Midgam R&C	HaHadashot 12	—N/a	24	6	—N/a	9	—N/a	9	7	7	12			9	21	14	—N/a	—N/a	49
23 Apr	Filber	Channel 14	958	35	4	4	8	(1.2%)	11	8	9	11			8	10	12	—N/a	—N/a	**66**
17 Apr	LRI+P4A	Maariv	500	25	7	(2.3%)	8	(2.1%)	9	7	9	5	5	(2.0%)	9	24	12	(2.3%)	—N/a	49
16 Apr	Kantar	Israel Hayom	—N/a	26	6	(2.5%)	10	—N/a	9	7	8	5	6	—N/a	9	20	14	—N/a	—N/a	52
16 Apr	Yossi Tatika	Zman Yisrael	500	28	5	—N/a	6	4	9	8	10	5	4	—N/a	9	16	16	—N/a	—N/a	51
16 Apr	Midgam R&C	HaHadashot 12	—N/a	25	6	(2.8%)	10	(2%)	9	7	9	5	5	(1.4%)	10	20	14	(2.8%)	—N/a	51
16 Apr	Filber	Channel 14	511	35	(2.9%)	4	7	(1.2%)	11	8	9	12			10	11	13	—N/a	—N/a	**65**
16 Apr	2026 Israel–Lebanon ceasefire goes into effect																			
10 Apr	LRI+P4A	Maariv	500	25	7	(1.8%)	8	(2.5%)	9	7	9	5	5	(1.4%)	8	24	13	(1.6%)	—N/a	49
9 Apr	Filber	Channel 14	951	35	4	4	7	(1.8%)	10	9	8	11			10	10	12	—N/a	—N/a	**65**
9 Apr	Kantar	Kan 11	552	25	6	(2.4%)	10	(1.7%)	9	7	9	5	5	(1.8%)	11	19	14	(2.7%)	—N/a	51
9 Apr	MM+SN	Channel 13	—N/a	22	6	5	10	—N/a	10	7	8	5	6	—N/a	8	21	12	—N/a	—N/a	54
9 Apr	Midgam R&C	HaHadashot 12	—N/a	25	6	(2.9%)	9	(1.5%)	9	7	9	5	5	(0.9%)	10	22	13	(0.9%)	—N/a	50
30–31 Mar	LRI+P4A	Maariv	500	25	8	(2%)	8	(1.4%)	9	7	8	4	6	(1.2%)	9	22	14	(1.4%)	—N/a	49
30 Mar	A new budget is passed, avoiding a snap election																			
29 Mar	Kantar	Kan 11	553	28	7	—N/a	8	—N/a	9	8	9	5	6	—N/a	9	19	13	—N/a	—N/a	53
26 Mar	Yossi Tatika	Zman Yisrael	500	29	6	—N/a	7	—N/a	9	8	10	5	5	—N/a	8	16	17	—N/a	—N/a	53
26 Mar	Filber	Channel 14	754	35	4	4	7	(1.2%)	10	9	8	12			10	10	11	—N/a	—N/a	**65**
25–26 Mar	LRI+P4A	Maariv	500	26	7	(2.3%)	9	(2.8%)	8	7	9	5	5	(1.3%)	10	21	13	(1.6%)	—N/a	50
20 Mar	LRI+P4A	Maariv	—N/a	28	8	—N/a	7	—N/a	8	7	10	5	5	—N/a	10	21	11	—N/a	—N/a	50
19 Mar	Midgam R&C	HaHadashot 12	503	28	6	—N/a	7	—N/a	9	7	9	5	5	—N/a	12	20	12	—N/a	—N/a	51
18–19 Mar	Yossi Tatika	Zman Yisrael	500	28	5	—N/a	7	4	8	8	10	5	5	—N/a	9	15	16	—N/a	—N/a	51
13 Mar	LRI+P4A	Maariv	500	27	7	(3.0%)	8	(1.3%)	8	7	8	5	5	(1.4%)	10	22	13	(2.8%)	2.4% (Note: Tzomet at 2.4%)	57
11–12 Mar	Yossi Tatika	Zman Yisrael	500	29	6	4	6	—N/a	8	7	10	5	5	—N/a	8	17	15	—N/a	—N/a	54
11 Mar	Midgam R&C	HaHadashot 12	—N/a	26	6	—N/a	9	—N/a	9	7	9	5	5	—N/a	12	21	11	—N/a	—N/a	51
5 Mar	Filber	Channel 14	742	34	4	4	8	(1.3%)	11	9	7	13			9	11	10	—N/a	—N/a	**66**
4–5 Mar	LRI+P4A	Maariv	500	27	6	(2.8%)	9	(2.0%)	8	7	8	5	5	(1.6%)	10	21	14	(2.8%)	—N/a	51
4–5 Mar	Yossi Tatika	Zman Yisrael	500	31	6	—N/a	6	4	9	7	10	5	5	—N/a	8	15	14	—N/a	—N/a	53
2 Mar	Start of the 2026 Lebanon war																			
28 Feb	Start of the 2026 Iran war																			
26 Feb	Midgam R&C	HaHadashot 12	—N/a	26	7	(2.6%)	10	(1.9%)	9	7	8	6	4	(1.6%)	11	21	11	(1.9%)	—N/a	52
26 Feb	Filber	Channel 14	579	33	4	5	8	—N/a	11	8	8	13			9	10	11	—N/a	—N/a	**65**
25–26 Feb	LRI+P4A	Maariv	501	25	7	(2.2%)	9	(2.7%)	8	7	8	14			9	20	13	(1.9%)	—N/a	49
25–26 Feb	LRI+P4A	Maariv	501	26	8	(2.2%)	9	(2.8%)	8	7	8	5	5	(1.5%)	11	19	14	(1.9%)	—N/a	50
25–26 Feb	Yossi Tatika	Zman Yisrael	500	27	7	—N/a	8	—N/a	10	8	10	6	5	—N/a	9	18	12	—N/a	—N/a	53
19 Feb	Filber	Channel 14	1024	34	5	4	8	—N/a	10	9	8	13			9	11	9	—N/a	—N/a	**65**
18–19 Feb	LRI+P4A	Maariv	501	26	8	(2.6%)	9	(2.9%)	8	7	8	5	5	(1.8%)	11	20	13	(1.3%)	—N/a	50
18–19 Feb	Yossi Tatika	Zman Yisrael	500	27	7	—N/a	7	4	10	8	10	6	5	—N/a	9	18	9	—N/a	—N/a	52
18 Feb	Direct Polls	i24 News	535	34	(2.9%)	4	8	(2.6%)	10	8	8	14			9	14	11	(2.4%)	—N/a	**64**
17 Feb	MM+SN	Channel 13	—N/a	25	9	(2.4%)	8	(1.6%)	10	7	8	15			7	22	9	(1.3%)	—N/a	50
12 Feb	Midgam R&C	HaHadashot 12	—N/a	25	7	(2.7%)	9	(1.9%)	9	7	9	12			11	20	11	(2.0%)	—N/a	50
12 Feb	Midgam R&C	HaHadashot 12	—N/a	26	7	(2.7%)	9	(2.2%)	9	7	9	5	5	(2.0%)	11	21	11	(2.3%)	—N/a	51
12 Feb	Filber	Channel 14	532	35	5	5	7	—N/a	10	9	8	13			10	10	8	—N/a	—N/a	**66**
11–12 Feb	Yossi Tatika	Zman Yisrael	500	27	8	—N/a	7	—N/a	10	8	10	15			8	19	8	—N/a	—N/a	52
11–12 Feb	Yossi Tatika	Zman Yisrael	500	28	9	—N/a	7	—N/a	10	8	11	6	5	—N/a	8	20	8	—N/a	—N/a	53
11–12 Feb	LRI+P4A	Maariv	593	25	9	(2.5%)	10	(2.5%)	8	7	9	5	5	(2.0%)	9	21	12	(2.3%)	—N/a	50
11 Feb	Kantar	Israel Hayom	—N/a	26	7	(2.7%)	10	(2.9%)	9	7	9	13			9	20	10	(1.9%)	—N/a	52
11 Feb	Kantar	Israel Hayom	—N/a	27	7	(2.7%)	10	(2.9%)	9	7	9	5	5	(2.3%)	9	21	11	(1.9%)	—N/a	53
6 Feb	TrendZone	–	—N/a	33	5	—N/a	8	—N/a	7	7	8	15			9	20	8	—N/a	—N/a	55
5 Feb	Filber	Channel 14	952	34	4	4	7	4	11	9	8	13			9	11	6	—N/a	—N/a	**65**
5 Feb	Yossi Tatika	The Times of Israel	500	27	8	—N/a	7	4	10	8	10	14			8	18	6	—N/a	—N/a	52
4 Feb	MM+SN	Channel 13	—N/a	26	8	4	9	—N/a	9	6	7	15			8	22	6	—N/a	—N/a	54
29 Jan	Midgam R&C	HaHadashot 12	501	27	8	(2.9%)	8	(1.8%)	9	7	8	12			11	21	9	(1.0%)	—N/a	51
29 Jan	Filber	Channel 14	952	34	6	4	7	(3.0%)	10	9	9	13			9	12	7	—N/a	—N/a	**64**
28–29 Jan	LRI+P4A	Maariv	503	27	7	(2.2%)	8	(2.7%)	8	7	9	13			9	22	10	(1.8%)	—N/a	50
28–29 Jan	Yossi Tatika	Zman Yisrael	500	27	8	—N/a	7	—N/a	9	8	10	16			9	19	7	—N/a	—N/a	51
28–29 Jan	Yossi Tatika	Zman Yisrael	500	28	9	—N/a	7	—N/a	10	8	10	6	5	—N/a	10	19	8	—N/a	—N/a	53
22 Jan	Ra'am, Hadash–Ta'al, and Balad publicly commit to re-establish the Joint List																			
22 Jan	Midgam R&C	HaHadashot 12	501	25	8	(2.9%)	9	(1.7%)	9	8	9	5	5	(1.1%)	11	22	9	(2.7%)	—N/a	51
22 Jan	Filber	Channel 14	503	34	5	5	7	4	10	9	8	5	6	(2.4%)	10	10	7	—N/a	—N/a	**65**
21–22 Jan	LRI+P4A	Maariv	501	25	9	(2.0%)	9	(2.8%)	8	7	9	5	5	(1.9%)	9	23	11	(2.8%)	—N/a	49
21–22 Jan	Yossi Tatika	Zman Yisrael	500	25	8	4	6	4	10	8	10	6	5	—N/a	9	18	7	—N/a	—N/a	53
20 Jan	MM+SN	Channel 13	—N/a	25	7	(2.6%)	9	(2.0%)	10	7	9	4	5	4	10	23	7	(2.0%)	—N/a	51
15 Jan	Midgam R&C	HaHadashot 12	504	26	9	(2.9%)	9	(2.4%)	8	8	8	5	5	(1.7%)	12	22	8	(1.4%)	—N/a	51
15 Jan	TrendZone	–	—N/a	34	5	—N/a	10	(1.8%)	6	6	6	5	6	—N/a	12	21	9	—N/a	—N/a	56
15 Jan	Filber	Channel 14	604	35	5	4	7	(2.8%)	11	9	10	6	5	(2.1%)	11	11	6	—N/a	—N/a	**66**
14–15 Jan	LRI+P4A	Maariv	501	26	9	(2.6%)	10	(2.3%)	8	7	8	4	5	(2.1%)	10	22	11	(2.6%)	—N/a	51
14–15 Jan	Yossi Tatika	Zman Yisrael	500	27	9	—N/a	7	4	10	8	10	6	5	—N/a	8	19	7	—N/a	—N/a	52
14 Jan	Kantar	Israel Hayom	600	27	8	(2.9%)	9	(3.0%)	10	7	8	5	5	(1.9%)	9	23	9	(2.7%)	—N/a	53
8 Jan	Midgam R&C	HaHadashot 12	—N/a	25	9	4	8	(0.6%)	8	7	8	5	5	(1.3%)	12	21	8	(2.5%)	—N/a	52
8 Jan	Filber	Channel 14	506	35	6	4	7	(1.4%)	11	9	9	5	5	(2.1%)	8	13	8	—N/a	—N/a	**66**
7–8 Jan	LRI+P4A	Maariv	503	27	8	(2.2%)	9	(2.2%)	8	7	9	5	5	(1.8%)	10	22	10	(2.7%)	—N/a	51
7–8 Jan	Yossi Tatika	Zman Yisrael	500	28	10	—N/a	7	—N/a	10	8	10	6	5	—N/a	9	21	6	—N/a	—N/a	53
7 Jan	MM+SN	Channel 13	—N/a	26	7	(2.3%)	10	(2.3%)	10	7	10	5	5	(2.3%)	8	24	8	(1.6%)	—N/a	53
1 Jan	Midgam R&C	HaHadashot 12	—N/a	26	10	(2.9%)	9	(2.0%)	9	7	9	5	5	(1.8%)	11	21	8	(2.7%)	—N/a	51
1 Jan	Filber	Channel 14	736	35	6	5	7	(0.9%)	11	8	9	5	5	(2.1%)	10	11	8	—N/a	—N/a	**66**
31 Dec – 1 Jan	LRI+P4A	Maariv	—N/a	27	9	(2.8%)	10	(2.0%)	8	7	10	5	5	(2.0%)	10	19	10	(3.0%)	—N/a	52
31 Dec – 1 Jan	Yossi Tatika	Zman Yisrael	500	28	10	—N/a	6	—N/a	10	8	10	6	5	—N/a	8	22	7	—N/a	—N/a	52

== Voting intention polls (reported as percentages) ==
The following polls reported raw percentages of responses without calculating seat projections, with voting share only for respondents who expressed a preference for a particular party option. In cases where respondents indicated that they will not vote, or declined to respond, the percentages were recalculated to omit them.

=== 2026 ===
Date	Polling firm	Publisher	Sample size	Gov.					Opposition (Note: The inclusion of Zionist Home, Blue & White, Winter and Unity may vary.)								Arab-dominated			Other	Don't know
Date	Polling firm	Publisher	Sample size	Likud	RZP	Otzma	Shas	UTJ	Together	Blue & White	Yisrael Beiteinu	Dems	Yashar	Zionist Home	Unity	Winter	Ra'am	Joint List		Other	Don't know
Date	Polling firm	Publisher	Sample size	Likud	RZP	Otzma	Shas	UTJ	Together	Blue & White	Yisrael Beiteinu	Dems	Yashar	Zionist Home	Unity	Winter	Ra'am	Hadash –Ta'al	Balad	Other	Don't know
7 Sep	S.M.L.T.	—N/a	2,185	19.2	6.1	7.6	7.9	5.9	7.3	3.3	5.7	7.0	15.2	1.79 (Note: The Reservists- NEP)	—N/a	2.1	4.2	5.7	—N/a	1.24 (Note: Noam at 0.35% El Hadgel at 0.34% Israel First at 0.30% Haredi Public at 0.24%)	—N/a
9 Aug	Kantar	Kan 11	551	18.3	3.8	6.1	6.1	6.1	9.9	1.3	7.6	7.6	17.6	3	1.9	—N/a	4.6	3.8	2.1		
9 Aug	Kantar	Kan 11	551	17.8	3.7	6.0	6.0	6.0	9.7	1.4	7.5	7.5	17.2	2.8	1.7	3	4.5	3.7	1.5		
9 Aug	Kantar	Kan 11	551	18	3.9	6.3	6.3	6.3	10.8	1.3	7.8	7	17.2	3	1.9	—N/a	3.9 (Note: with Yoav Segalovitz)	6.3			
30 Jul	Midgam R&C	HaHadashot 12	505	35					48											5	12
29 Jul	Midgam R&C	Channel 13	956	35					49											6	10
25 Jul	Midgam R&C	HaHadashot 12	—N/a	34					39								7			5	15
16 Jul	Midgam R&C	HaHadashot 12	502	36					49											3	12

=== 2024 ===
Date	Polling firm	Publisher	Likud	Yesh Atid	RZP	Otzma	National Unity (Note: From 12 October 2023 to 9 June 2024 National Unity was a part of the governing coalition)	Shas	UTJ	Yisrael Beiteinu	New Hope (Note: New Hope left the government on 25 March 2024 and rejoined it on 30 September 2024)	Ra'am	Hadash –Ta'al	Dems	Balad	"A new right-wing party"	Gov.
Dec	Viterbi Center	Israel Democracy Institute	20.5	8.9	5.6	5.6	11.0	6.1	5.6	8.9	—N/a	5.8	2.3	10.2	1.5	7.8	43.4
Oct	Viterbi Center	Israel Democracy Institute	19.4	9.4	4.3	8.9	12.6	6.3	6.1	8.9	—N/a	2.8	2.0	9.6	2.0	7.6	45.0
Sep	Viterbi Center	Israel Democracy Institute	18.6	9.6	4.3	8.4	13.7	6.3	5.6	10.1	—N/a	2.8	2.1	10.2	2.1	6.3	43.2
Aug	Viterbi Center	Israel Democracy Institute	15.6	12.6	2.1	9.4	16.8	6.0	5.5	9.0	—N/a	3.0	2.1	10.7	1.1	6.2	38.6
Jul	Viterbi Center	Israel Democracy Institute	12.5	9.8	2.8	7.9	12.9	6.5	7.5	22.4 (Note: July 2024 survey grouped Yisrael Beiteinu with New Hope and "a new right-wing party" on a possible joint ticket)		4.5	1.4	9.8	1.4	–	37.2
Jun	Viterbi Center	Israel Democracy Institute	11.4	11.4	2.4	7.3	21.1	6.5	6.1	11.8	0.4	4.1	2.8	13.4	1.2	—N/a	33.7

Date	Polling firm	Publisher	Likud	Yesh Atid	RZP	Otzma	National Unity	New Hope	Shas	UTJ	Yisrael Beiteinu	Ra'am	Hadash –Ta'al	Labor	Meretz	Balad	Other	Don't know	Gov.
31 Mar – 2 Apr (Note: Recalculated to omit respondents that answered "will not vote" or that declined to respond. Raw data of poll (out of 750 respondents) saw 27 (4%) decline to respond; 72 (10%) answer "will not vote"; with the remaining answers being Likud 50 (7%), Yesh Atid 84 (11%), Otzma Yehudit 39 (5%), National Unity 108 (14%), New Hope 8 (1%), Shas 26 (3%), UTJ 40 (5%), Yisrael Beiteinu 27 (4%), Ra'am 21 (3%), Hadash–Ta'al 19 (3%), Labor 15 (2%), Meretz 28 (4%), Balad 15 (2%), Other 14 (2%), undecided 137 (18%))	Viterbi Center	Israel Democracy Institute	7.68	12.90	3.07	5.99	16.59	1.23	3.99	6.14	4.15	3.23	2.92	2.30	4.30	2.30	2.15	21.04	26.87
May	Viterbi Center	Israel Democracy Institute	14.3	15.5	3.7	7.8	21.9	1.3	6.7	7.6	8.4	2.2	2.2	3.7	3.7	1.1	—N/a	—N/a	40.1
1–6 May (Note: Recalculated to omit respondents that answered "will not vote" or that declined to respond. Raw data of poll (out of 750 respondents) saw 23 (3%) decline to respond; 63 (8%) answer "will not vote"; with the remaining answers being Likud 60 (8%), Yesh Atid 75 (10%), Otzma Yehudit 34 (5%), National Unity 105 (14%), New Hope 5 (1%), Shas 29 (4%), UTJ 37 (5%), Yisrael Beiteinu 38 (5%), Ra'am 23 (3%), Hadash–Ta'al 11 (1%), Labor 17 (2%), Meretz 18 (2%), Balad 5 (1%), Other 11 (1%), undecided 180 (24%))	Viterbi Center	Israel Democracy Institute	9.04	11.30	2.56	0.45	15.81	0.75	4.37	5.57	5.72	3.46	1.66	2.56	2.56	0.75	1.66	27.11	21.99
Apr	Viterbi Center	Israel Democracy Institute	10.7	16.0	4.1	8.5	22.3	1.8	5.8	8.3	5.6	3.0	3.0	3.0	5.1	2.6	—N/a	—N/a	37.4
31 Mar – 3 Apr (Note: Recalculated to omit respondents that answered "will not vote" or that declined to respond. Raw data of poll (out of 755 respondents) saw 32 (4%) decline to respond; 79 (10%) answer "will not vote"; with the remaining answers being Likud 80 (11%), Yesh Atid 47 (6%), Otzma Yehudit 44 (6%), National Unity 128 (18%), New Hope 16 (2%) Shas 26 (3%), UTJ 34 (5%), Yisrael Beiteinu 40 (5%), Ra'am 15 (2%), Hadash–Ta'al 23 (3%), Labor 10 (1%), Meretz 17 (2%), Balad 9 (1%), Other 6 (1%), undecided 137 (18%))	Viterbi Center	Israel Democracy Institute	12.42	7.30	1.86	6.83	19.86	2.48	4.04	5.28	6.21	2.33	3.57	1.55	2.64	1.40	0.93	21.27	30.43
Mar	Viterbi Center	Israel Democracy Institute	16.7	8.2	2.4	9.4	24.6	3.1	5.5	7.1	8.2	4.3	2.7	1.6	3.7	2.9	—N/a	—N/a	41.1
28 Feb – 4 Mar (Note: Recalculated to omit respondents that answered "will not vote" or that declined to respond. Raw data of poll (out of 750 respondents) saw 75 (10%) decline to respond; 105 (14%) answer "will not vote"; with the remaining answers being Likud 75 (10%), Yesh Atid 68 (9%), Otzma Yehudit 29 (4%), National Unity 176 (23%), Shas 32 (4%), UTJ 30 (4%), Yisrael Beiteinu 40 (9%), Ra'am 30 (4%), Hadash–Ta'al 8 (1%), Labor 22 (2%), Meretz 22 (3%), Balad 11 (1%), Other 14 (2%), undecided 12 (2%))	Viterbi Center	Israel Democracy Institute	13.79	12.50	2.21	5.15	32.35		5.88	5.51	7.35	5.51	1.47	2.02	4.04	2.02	2.57	2.21	32.54
Feb	Viterbi Center	Israel Democracy Institute	15.6	11.4	2.6	6.4	31.8		6.2	5.3	7.1	4.9	0.8	2.0	3.7	1.9	—N/a	—N/a	36.1
1 November 2022	2022 legislative election		23.41	17.79	10.84		9.08		8.25	5.88	4.48	4.07	3.75	3.69	3.16	2.91	2.67	—N/a	48.38

== Scenario polls ==
Most often, opinion polling about hypothetical scenarios is done in the same survey as the regular polling. This is why these scenario polls are paired for comparison purposes.

Regular poll
Scenario poll

=== New parties and mergers ===
==== Tally Gotliv joins Otzma Yehudit ====
Fieldwork date	Polling firm	Publisher	Likud	Together	RZP- Zehut	Amcha Yisrael	Otzma	Blue & White	Shas	UTJ	Yisrael Beiteinu	Ra'am	Joint List	Dems	Yashar	Zionist Home	Unity	Others	Gov.
2 Sep	LRI+P4A	Walla	22	15	5	(2.3%)	7	(0.7%)	7	8	9	5	8	10	24	(3.0%)	(0.7%)	3.1% (Note: NEP at 2.0% A Place for Us All at 0.5% Haredi Public at 0.4% Israel First at 0.2%)	49
2 Sep	LRI+P4A	Walla	21	15	4	(2.8%)	8	(1.1%)	7	8	10	5	8	10	24	(3.0%)	(0.5%)	3.1% (Note: NEP at 1.6% A Place for Us All at 0.7% Haredi Public at 0.6% Israel First at 0.2%)	48
2 Sep	Direct Polls	i24 News	27	9	6	5	7	(<1%)	7	8	8	5	7	10	23	(<1%)	(<1%)	N/A (Note: Achi at <1% El Degegl at <1% NEP at <1% Haredi Public at <1% Kahal at <1% Zehut at 1.3% NEP at 1.1% Israel First at <1% Noam at <1% Black at <1%)	55
2 Sep	Direct Polls	i24 News	26	9	11		8	(<1%)	7	8	7	5	7	9	23	(<1%)	(<1%)	N/A (Note: Achi at <1% El Degegl at <1% NEP at <1% Haredi Public at <1% Kahal at <1% Zehut at 1.3% NEP at 1.1% Israel First at <1% Noam at <1% Black at <1%)	60

==== RZP-Otzma-Zehut mergers ====
Fieldwork date	Polling firm	Publisher	Likud	Together	Zehut	RZP	Otzma	Blue & White	Shas	UTJ	Yisrael Beiteinu	Ra'am	Joint List	Dems	Yashar	Zionist Home	Unity	Amcha Yisrael	Others	Gov.
31 Aug	Midgam R&C	HaHadashot 12	23	15	(2.1%)	(2.6%)	8	(0.9%)	7	8	9	4	7	11	24	(2.6%)	(0.5%)	4	2.2% (Note: NEP at 1.0% Haredi Public at 1.2%)	46
31 Aug	Midgam R&C	HaHadashot 12	21	15	(1.6%)	11		(1.2%)	7	8	9	4	7	11	23	(2.2%)	(1.5%)	4	2.9% (Note: NEP at 1.5% Haredi Public at 1.4%)	47
30 Aug	Kantar	Kan 11	21	14	–	5	7	(1.5%)	7	8	8	5	8	9	24	(2.4%)	(0.7%)	4	–	48
30 Aug	Kantar	Kan 11	20	?	–	10		–	?	?	?	5	8	?	?	–	–	5	–	45

==== Unity-Reservists-B&W-NEP merger ====
Fieldwork date	Polling firm	Publisher	Likud	Together	RZP	Otzma	Zionist Home	Blue & White	Unity	NEP	Shas	UTJ	Yisrael Beiteinu	Ra'am	Joint List		Dems	Yashar	Amcha Yisrael (Note: Polls before 25 August 2026 refer to it as "Party of Ofer Winter".)	Others	Gov.
Fieldwork date	Polling firm	Publisher	Likud	Together	RZP	Otzma	Zionist Home	Blue & White	Unity	NEP	Shas	UTJ	Yisrael Beiteinu	Ra'am	Hadash –Ta'al	Balad	Dems	Yashar	Amcha Yisrael	Others	Gov.
2 Sep	Maagar Mochot	Channel 16	19	18	5	9	(2%)	(1%)	(1%)	(2%)	9	7	7	4	7		10	20	5	3% (Note: Haredi Public at 1%)	49
2 Sep	Maagar Mochot	Channel 16	17	14	5	8	9				9	7	6	4	8		10	19	4	1% (Note: Haredi Public at 1%)	46
24 Aug	Midgam R&C	HaHadashot 12	22	15	4	9	(2.9%)	(0.8%)	(0.4%)	–	7	8	9	4	7		11	24	—N/a	–	50
24 Aug	Midgam R&C	HaHadashot 12	21	15	(2.9%)	9	(2.8%)	(2.4%)		–	7	8	9	4	7		11	25	4	–	50
10 Aug	Midgam R&C	HaHadashot 12	22	15	5	8	(2.7%)	(0.8%)	(1.3%)	–	7	8	10	5	5	(1.6%)	11	24	—N/a	–	50
10 Aug	Midgam R&C	HaHadashot 12	19	14	5	8	6			–	7	8	10	5	5	–	11	22	—N/a	–	47

==== Joint Ofer Winter, Netali Shem Tov, Yoseph Haddad and Lali Deri party ====
Fieldwork date	Polling firm	Publisher	Likud	Together	RZP	Otzma	Blue & White	Shas	UTJ	Yisrael Beiteinu	Ra'am	Joint List		Dems	Yashar	Zionist Home	Unity	Winter	Tov+ Haddad+ Deri	Gov.
Fieldwork date	Polling firm	Publisher	Likud	Together	RZP	Otzma	Blue & White	Shas	UTJ	Yisrael Beiteinu	Ra'am	Hadash –Ta'al	Balad	Dems	Yashar	Zionist Home	Unity	Winter	Tov+ Haddad+ Deri	Gov.
23 Aug	Kantar	Kan 11	22	14	5	9	(1.8%)	7	8	9	5	7		10	24	(2.8%)	(1.6%)	(2.5%)	—N/a	51
23 Aug	Kantar	Kan 11	22	14	(3.0%)	8	–	7	8	10	5	7		10	24	–	–	5		45

==== Yoav Segalovitz joins Ra'am ====
Fieldwork date	Polling firm	Publisher	Likud	Together	RZP	Otzma	Blue & White	Shas	UTJ	Yisrael Beiteinu	Ra'am	Joint List		Dems	Yashar	Zionist Home	Unity	Others	Gov.
Fieldwork date	Polling firm	Publisher	Likud	Together	RZP	Otzma	Blue & White	Shas	UTJ	Yisrael Beiteinu	Ra'am	Hadash –Ta'al	Balad	Dems	Yashar	Zionist Home	Unity	Others	Gov.
23 Aug	Kantar	Kan 11	22	14	5	9	(1.8%)	7	8	9	5	7		10	24	(2.8%)	(1.6%)	2.5% (Note: Ofer Winter at 2.5%)	51
23 Aug	Kantar	Kan 11	22	14	5	9	–	7	8	9	5	7		10	24	–	–	–	51
12–13 Aug	LRI+P4A	Maariv	21	14	4	8	(1.9%)	7	8	10	5	6	(1.5%)	10	23	4	(1.9%)	3.1% (Note: NEP at 2.5% Israel First at 0.6%)	48
12–13 Aug	LRI+P4A	Maariv	20	13	4	8	(1.6%)	7	8	10	6	8		10	22	4	(0.9%)	3.1% (Note: NEP at 2.5% Israel First at 0.6%)	48
10 Aug	Midgam R&C	HaHadashot 12	22	15	5	8	(0.8%)	7	8	10	5	5	(1.6%)	11	24	(2.7%)	(1.3%)	–	50
10 Aug	Midgam R&C	HaHadashot 12	22	15	5	8	–	7	8	10	6	6		10	23	–	–	–	50
3 Aug	Midgam R&C	HaHadashot 12	23	14	5	7	(1.4%)	7	8	9	5	5	(1.0%)	10	23	4	—N/a	–	50
3 Aug	Midgam R&C	HaHadashot 12	23	14	5	7	–	7	8	9	6	5		9	23	4	—N/a	–	50
2 Aug	Kantar	Kan 11	23	13	4	9	(1.4%)	8	8	9	5	6	(2.2%)	8	23	4	—N/a	–	52
2 Aug	Kantar	Kan 11	23	13	4	9	–	8	8	9	5	6	–	8	23	4	—N/a	–	52

==== Likud-RZP, Ra'am-Segalovitz and Zionist Home-Blue & White mergers ====
Fieldwork date	Polling firm	Publisher	Likud	RZP	Together	Otzma	Blue & White	Zionist Home	Shas	UTJ	Yisrael Beiteinu	Ra'am	Joint List	Dems	Yashar	Unity	Amcha Yisrael	Others	Gov.
31 Aug	Midgam R&C	HaHadashot 12	23	(2.6%)	15	8	(0.9%)	(2.6%)	7	8	9	4	7	11	24	(0.5%)	4	4.3% (Note: Zehut at 2.1% NEP at 1.0% Haredi Public at 1.2%)	46
31 Aug	Midgam R&C	HaHadashot 12	20		15	9	4		7	8	9	4	7	11	22	(1.4%)	4	5.2% (Note: Zehut at 2.0% NEP at 1.9% Haredi Public at 1.3%)	44

==== Hili Tropper joins Yashar ====
Fieldwork date	Polling firm	Publisher	Likud	Together	RZP	Otzma	Blue & White	Shas	UTJ	Yisrael Beiteinu	Ra'am	Joint List		Dems	Yashar	Zionist Home		Unity	Gov.
Fieldwork date	Polling firm	Publisher	Likud	Together	RZP	Otzma	Blue & White	Shas	UTJ	Yisrael Beiteinu	Ra'am	Hadash –Ta'al	Balad	Dems	Yashar	Tropper	Reserv.	Unity	Gov.
17 Aug	Midgam R&C	HaHadashot 12	22	15	5	8	(1.4%)	7	8	10	5	5	(1.8%)	11	24	(1.5%)		(1.7%)	50
17 Aug	Midgam R&C	HaHadashot 12	22	15	5	8	–	7	8	9	5	5	–	11	25		–	–	50
12 Aug	MP+TM+SN+A	Channel 13	21	12	5	8	(1.0%)	7	8	10	5	6	(1.2%)	11	23	4		(1.0%)	49
12 Aug	MP+TM+SN+A	Channel 13	20	12	?	?	(2.1%) (Note: with Ayelet Shaked)	?	?	?	5	9		?	22		–	(1.5%)	49
12 Jul	Kantar	Kan 11	23	15	5	8	(2.7%)	8	8	10	5	5	(2.0%)	9	24	(3.1%)		—N/a	52
12 Jul	Kantar	Kan 11	23	14	5	8	–	8	8	10	5	5	–	9	25		–	—N/a	52

==== Together-Yashar-Tropper, Blue & White-Unity, Zehut-RZP-Amcha Yisrael, Segalovitz-Ra'am mergers ====
Fieldwork date	Polling firm	Publisher	Likud	Together	Yashar	Zionist Home		Zehut	RZP	Amcha Yisrael	Otzma	Blue & White	Unity	Shas	UTJ	Yisrael Beiteinu	Ra'am	Joint List	Dems	Others	Gov.
Fieldwork date	Polling firm	Publisher	Likud	Together	Yashar	Tropper	Reserv.	Zehut	RZP	Amcha Yisrael	Otzma	Blue & White	Unity	Shas	UTJ	Yisrael Beiteinu	Ra'am	Joint List	Dems	Others	Gov.
2–3 Sep	Kantar	Israel Hayom	21	13	24	(2.7%)		6		4	7	(1.7%)	(0.7%)	7	8	9	5	7	9	–	49
2–3 Sep	Kantar	Israel Hayom	21	12	24	(2.0%)		11			7	(1.5%)	–	7	8	9	5	7	9	–	54
2–3 Sep	Kantar	Israel Hayom	21	36		(2.0%)		4		5	7	(1.5%)	–	7	8	8	5	7	10	–	49
31 Aug	Midgam R&C	HaHadashot 12	23	15	24	(2.6%)		(2.1%)	(2.6%)	4	8	(0.9%)	(0.5%)	7	8	9	4	7	11	2.2% (Note: NEP at 1.0% Haredi Public at 1.2%)	46
31 Aug	Midgam R&C	HaHadashot 12	23	15	24	(2.7%)		5		(2.1%)	7	(2.6%)		7	8	9	4	7	11	3.0% (Note: NEP at 1.5% Haredi Public at 1.5%)	50
26 Aug	MP+TM+SN+A	Channel 13	19	13	24	(2.0%)		(1.1%)	5	(2.2%)	8	(1.8%)	(0.8%)	8	8	9	5	10	11	–	48
26 Aug	MP+TM+SN+A	Channel 13	17	36			–	–	7		?	(2.1%)		?	?	9	5	9	11	–	50

==== Likud B, Benjamin Netanyahu, Ofer Winter parties and Reservists-B&W merger ====
New parties from Benjamin Netanyahu, Ofer Winter, and a right-wing bloc ("Likud B") between combinations of Aliza Bloch, Yuli Edelstein, Gilad Erdan, Sharren Haskel, Moshe Kahlon, and Ayelet Shaked.

Fieldwork date	Polling firm	Publisher	Likud	Netanyahu	Together		Yashar	Winter	RZP	Otzma	Likud B (Note: Since 6 July 2026, it refers to the Unity of Bloch, Edelstein and Erdan.)	Blue & White	Zionist Home (Note: Before Hili Tropper joined the party on 7 July 2026, it was known as "The Reservists".)	Shas	UTJ	Yisrael Beiteinu	Joint List			Dems	Gov.
Fieldwork date	Polling firm	Publisher	Likud	Netanyahu	Bennett 2026	Yesh Atid	Yashar	Winter	RZP	Otzma	Likud B	Blue & White	Zionist Home	Shas	UTJ	Yisrael Beiteinu	Ra'am	Hadash –Ta'al	Balad	Dems	Gov.
6 Aug	Kantar	Israel Hayom	23	—N/a	13		23	—N/a	4	9	—N/a	(0.7%)	4	7	8	9	6	5	(1.6%)	10	51
6 Aug	Kantar	Israel Hayom	23	—N/a	13		21	—N/a	(2.8%)	9	8 (Note: Bloch, Edelstein, Erdan, Haskel and Shaked)			7	8	9	6	5	(1.6%)	11	47
5 Aug	MP+TM+SN+A	Channel 13	22	—N/a	13		23	—N/a	5	9	—N/a	(1.4%)	(3.0%)	7	8	11	5	6	(1.2%)	11	51
5 Aug	MP+TM+SN+A	Channel 13	20	—N/a	12		23	—N/a	5	9	(1.7%) (Note: Edelstein and Erdan)	(1.4%)	(2.4%)	7	8	?	7	8		?	49
4 Aug	SF+DP	Channel 14	31	—N/a	8		22	(1.2%)	6	6	(0.7%) (Note: Erdan)	(0.5%)	(1.9%)	11	8	8	5	5	(2.9%)	10	62
2 Aug	Kantar	Kan 11	23	—N/a	13		23	—N/a	4	9	—N/a	(1.4%)	4	8	8	9	5	6	(2.2%)	8	52
2 Aug	Kantar	Kan 11	23	—N/a	13		23	–	4	8	–	–	4	8	8	9	5	6	–	9	51
29–30 Jul	SF+ND	Zman Yisrael	20	—N/a	13		21	—N/a	6	7	—N/a	4	4	8	8	10	5	6		8	49
29–30 Jul	SF+ND	Zman Yisrael	20	—N/a	14		23	—N/a	6	7	5	–	–	8	8	10	5	6		8	49
29–30 Jul	LRI+P4A	Maariv	22	—N/a	15		23	—N/a	5	7	—N/a	(1.2%)	4	7	8	10	5	5	(1.8%)	9	49
29–30 Jul	LRI+P4A	Maariv	22	—N/a	15		22	—N/a	4	8	4 (Note: Edelstein and Shaked)		(2.4%)	7	8	10	5	5	(1.8%)	9	50
23 Jul	Kantar	Israel Hayom	23	—N/a	14		23	—N/a	5	9	—N/a	(2.4%)	(3.0%)	8	8	9	5	5	(2.0%)	10	53
23 Jul	Kantar	Israel Hayom	21	—N/a	14		22	—N/a	4	9	5		(2.7%)	8	8	8	6	5	(1.7%)	10	50
20 Jul	Midgam R&C	HaHadashot 12	23	—N/a	15		24	—N/a	4	8	—N/a	(1.3%)	(2.7%)	8	8	9	5	5	(1.7%)	11	51
20 Jul	Midgam R&C	HaHadashot 12	25	—N/a	15		25	(2.6%)	–	9	(1.6%)	(1.6%)	(2.6%)	8	8	9	5	5	(1.7%)	11	50
13 Jul	Midgam R&C	HaHadashot 12	22	—N/a	16		23	—N/a	5	8	—N/a	(1.4%)	(2.9%)	8	8	10	5	5	(0.9%)	10	51
13 Jul	Midgam R&C	HaHadashot 12	22	—N/a	16		23	—N/a	5	8	(2.8%) (Note: Edelstein, Erdan and Shaked)	(1.0%)	(2.9%)	8	8	10	5	5	(0.9%)	10	51
12 Jul	Kantar	Kan 11	23	—N/a	15		24	—N/a	5	8	—N/a	(2.7%)	(3.1%)	8	8	10	5	5	(2.0%)	9	52
12 Jul	Kantar	Kan 11	22	—N/a	15		24	–	4	7	5	–	–	8	8	8	5	5	–	9	49
9 Jul	Direct Polls	i24 News	29	—N/a	9		21	—N/a	5	8	—N/a	–	–	9	8	9	5	7		10	59
9 Jul	Direct Polls	i24 News	29	—N/a	9		21	—N/a	5	8	–	–	–	9	8	9	5	7		10	59
6 Jul	Midgam R&C	HaHadashot 12	23	—N/a	16		23	—N/a	4	9	—N/a	(1.0%)	(1.0%)	8	8	9	4	6	(0.7%)	10	52
6 Jul	Midgam R&C	HaHadashot 12	22	—N/a	14		22	—N/a	4	8	6 (Note: with Hili Tropper)			8	8	8	4	6	–	10	50
1–2 Jul	Yossi Tatika	Zman Yisrael	22	—N/a	16		23	—N/a	5	8	—N/a	–	–	10	8	11	4	5	–	8	53
1–2 Jul	Yossi Tatika	Zman Yisrael	21	—N/a	14		22	—N/a	12		—N/a	5		9	8	9	5	7		8	50
1 Jul	MP+TM+SN+A	Channel 13	21	—N/a	17		20	—N/a	5	8	—N/a	–	–	9	8	10	5	6	–	11	51
1 Jul	MP+TM+SN+A	Channel 13	18	—N/a	14		19	—N/a	?	?	4	5		?	?	?	4	10		?	47
25 Jun	Kantar	Israel Hayom	24	—N/a	16		21	—N/a	4	9	—N/a	(1.8%)	(2.7%)	8	8	9	4	7	(1.7%)	10	53
25 Jun	Kantar	Israel Hayom	23	—N/a	17		21	5	(2.3%)	8	—N/a	(1.7%)	(2.2%)	8	8	8	4	7	(1.5%)	11	47
25 Jun	Kantar	Israel Hayom	23	—N/a	15		19	—N/a	4	8	—N/a	7		8	8	7	4	7	(1.7%)	10	51
25 Jun	Direct Polls	i24 News	27	—N/a	11		20	—N/a	5	8	—N/a	(1.2%)	(1.7%)	9	8	10	5	7		10	57
25 Jun	Direct Polls	i24 News	7	24	11		19	—N/a	4	6	—N/a	–	–	9	8	10	5	7		10	58
24–25 Jun	Yossi Tatika	Zman Yisrael	21	—N/a	15		23	—N/a	4	8	—N/a	4	–	10	7	12	4	4	–	7	50
24–25 Jun	Yossi Tatika	Zman Yisrael	21	—N/a	15		22	—N/a	12		—N/a	7		9	7	10	4	6		7	49
11 Jun	Kantar	Israel Hayom	24	—N/a	19		20	—N/a	4	9	—N/a	(1.8%)	(2.5%)	9	7	9	4	6	(2.5%)	9	53
11 Jun	Kantar	Israel Hayom	23	—N/a	18		19	—N/a	(2.9%)	10	6	(2.3%)	(1.8%)	9	7	9	4	6	(1.8%)	9	49
4 Jun	Yossi Tatika	Zman Yisrael	23	—N/a	21		19	—N/a	4	6	—N/a	4	–	9	8	10	4	4	–	8	50
4 Jun	Yossi Tatika	Zman Yisrael	21	—N/a	20		19	—N/a	10		—N/a	4	–	9	8	9	13			7	48
1–2 Jun	LRI+P4A	Maariv	21	—N/a	19		20	—N/a	5	8	—N/a	(0.8%)	(1.4%)	8	8	10	5	6	(1.6%)	10	50
1–2 Jun	LRI+P4A	Maariv	7	16	20		20	—N/a	5	6	—N/a	(0.8%)	(1.4%)	7	8	10	5	6	(1.6%)	10	49
30 Apr	Kantar	Israel Hayom	28	—N/a	23		16	—N/a	(2.7%)	9	—N/a	(2.6%)	(1.9%)	8	7	9	5	6	(1.9%)	9	52
30 Apr	Kantar	Israel Hayom	25	—N/a	22		16	—N/a	(2.7%)	9	6 (Note: Edelstein, Kahlon and Erdan)	(2.6%)	(1.6%)	8	7	8	5	6	(1.6%)	8	49
29–30 Apr	LRI+P4A	Maariv	26	—N/a	28		14	—N/a	(1.5%)	9	—N/a	(2.8%)	(1.4%)	8	7	8	5	5	(1.4%)	10	50
29–30 Apr	LRI+P4A	Maariv	24	—N/a	27		14	—N/a	(1.8%)	8	4 (Note: Edelstein, Kahlon, Erdan, and Haskel) (3.5%)	(1.6%)	(1.4%)	8	7	8	5	5	(1.4%)	10	47
27 Apr	Midgam R&C	HaHadashot 12	25	—N/a	26		15	—N/a	(2.9%)	9	—N/a	(1.9%)	(1.8%)	9	7	9	5	5	(1.8%)	10	50
27 Apr	Midgam R&C	HaHadashot 12	23	—N/a	25		14	—N/a	–	9	5	–	–	9	7	8	5	5	–	10	48
26 Apr	TrendZone	Israel Hayom	27	—N/a	24		11	—N/a	–	8	9 (Note: New Right-wing party which excludes joining a coalition with the Democrats, Ultra-Orthodox or Arab parties)	–	–	7	7	6	5	6	–	10	49
18 Feb	Direct Polls	i24 News	34	—N/a	14	(2.9%)	11	—N/a	4	8	—N/a	(2.6%)	(2.4%)	10	8	8	14			9	64
18 Feb	Direct Polls	i24 News	32	—N/a	12	16		5 (Note: with Amir Avivi and Dedi Simchi)	(2.2%)	7	—N/a	(2.5%)	(1.9%)	10	8	8	14			8	57
12 Feb	Midgam R&C	HaHadashot 12	26	—N/a	21	7	11	—N/a	(2.7%)	9	—N/a	(2.2%)	(2.3%)	9	7	9	5	5	(2.0%)	11	51
12 Feb	Midgam R&C	HaHadashot 12	25	—N/a	20	6	10	—N/a	(2.7%)	9	—N/a	4		9	7	9	5	5	(2.0%)	11	50
7 Jan	MM+SN	Channel 13	26	—N/a	24	7	8	—N/a	(2.3%)	10	—N/a	(2.3%)	(1.6%)	10	7	10	5	5	(2.3%)	8	53
7 Jan	MM+SN	Channel 13	?	—N/a	?	?	?	7		?	—N/a	?	–	–	?	?	?	?	–	?	55
16 Oct 25	Midgam R&C	HaHadashot 12	27	—N/a	22	9	8	—N/a	(2.5%)	8	—N/a	(2.6%)	(1.4%)	9	7	9	5	5	(1.4%)	11	51
16 Oct 25	Midgam R&C	HaHadashot 12	27	—N/a	20	8	8	—N/a	–	8	4 (Note: Merger of Blue & White and Kahlon)		–	9	7	8	5	5	–	11	50
6 Jun 25	LRI+P4A	i24 News	19	—N/a	24	7	—N/a	—N/a	(2.8%)	8	—N/a	7	9	9	7	9	5	5	–	11	43
6 Jun 25	LRI+P4A	i24 News	?	—N/a	22	?	—N/a	8		?	—N/a	?	7	?	?	?	?	?	–	?	49

==== Dedi Simchi party with B&W, Hili Tropper party and NEP with Reservists ====
Fieldwork date	Polling firm	Publisher	Likud	Together	RZP	Otzma	Simchi	Blue & White	Zionist Home		NEP	Shas	UTJ	Yisrael Beiteinu	Joint List			Dems	Yashar	Gov.
Fieldwork date	Polling firm	Publisher	Likud	Together	RZP	Otzma	Simchi	Blue & White	Tropper	Reserv.	NEP	Shas	UTJ	Yisrael Beiteinu	Ra'am	Hadash –Ta'al	Balad	Dems	Yashar	Gov.
5–6 Aug	Yossi Tatika	Zman Yisrael	21	15	6	8	–		–		–	8	8	11	6	6		8	23	51
2 Aug	Kantar	Kan 11	23	13	4	9	(1.4%)		4		–	8	8	9	5	6	(2.2%)	8	23	52
20 Jul	Midgam R&C	HaHadashot 12	23	15	4	8	—N/a	(1.3%)	(2.7%)		–	8	8	9	5	5	(1.7%)	11	24	51
20 Jul	Midgam R&C	HaHadashot 12	23	15	4	8	(2.6%)		(2.7%)		–	8	8	9	5	5	(1.7%)	11	24	51
13 Jul	Midgam R&C	HaHadashot 12	22	16	5	8	—N/a	(1.4%)	(2.9%)		–	8	8	10	5	5	(0.9%)	10	23	51
13 Jul	Midgam R&C	HaHadashot 12	22	16	5	8	(1.8%)		–		–	8	8	10	5	5	–	10	23	51
6 Jul	Midgam R&C	HaHadashot 12	23	16	4	9	—N/a	(1.0%)	—N/a	(1.0%)	–	8	8	9	4	6	(0.7%)	10	23	52
6 Jul	Midgam R&C	HaHadashot 12	22	16	4	9	(1.9%)		—N/a	–	–	8	8	9	4	6	–	10	24	51
11 Jun	Midgam R&C	HaHadashot 12	20	20	4	9	—N/a	(0.7%)	—N/a	(1.6%)	–	9	7	8	5	5	(1.1%)	11	20	51
11 Jun	Midgam R&C	HaHadashot 12	20	20	4	9	(2.2%)		—N/a	–	–	9	7	8	5	5	–	11	20	51
10–11 Jun	Yossi Tatika	Zman Yisrael	24	21	–	8	—N/a	–	—N/a	–	–	10	8	10	5	5	–	8	21	50
10–11 Jun	Yossi Tatika	Zman Yisrael	23	19	9		4		—N/a	–	–	9	8	9	9			7	19	49
27 May	Kantar	Israel Hayom	25	22	4	8	—N/a	(2.2%)	—N/a	(2.5%)	–	9	7	9	5	5	(1.9%)	9	17	53
27 May	Kantar	Israel Hayom	24	21	(2.5%)	8	—N/a	(1.6%)	6		–	9	7	9	5	5	(1.9%)	9	17	48
14 May	Midgam R&C	HaHadashot 12	26	24	(2.8%)	9	—N/a	(2.7%)	—N/a	(1.0%)	–	9	8	9	5	5	(1.9%)	10	15	52
14 May	Midgam R&C	HaHadashot 12	26	24	–	9	(2%)	–	—N/a	–	–	9	8	9	5	5	–	10	15	52
14 May	Midgam R&C	HaHadashot 12	25	23	–	9	—N/a	–	4		–	9	8	8	5	5	–	10	14	51
13 May	Kantar	Israel Hayom	26	24	(2.9%)	9	—N/a	(2.7%)	—N/a	(3.0%)	–	9	7	8	5	6	(1.8%)	10	16	51
13 May	Kantar	Israel Hayom	24	21	(2.7%)	9	—N/a	(2.6%)	6		–	9	7	8	5	6	(1.8%)	9	16	49
12–13 May	LRI+P4A	Maariv	25	26	(2.1%)	8	—N/a	(2.1%)	—N/a	(2.6%)	–	9	7	9	5	5	(1.4%)	10	16	49
12–13 May	LRI+P4A	Maariv	24	25	(2.2%)	8	—N/a	(2.4%)	4		–	9	7	8	5	5	(1.6%)	10	15	48
7 May	Midgam R&C	HaHadashot 12	25	25	(2.9%)	9	—N/a	(1.5%)	—N/a	(1.0%)	–	9	8	9	5	5	(0.8%)	11	14	51
7 May	Midgam R&C	HaHadashot 12	24	23	–	9	—N/a	–	5		–	9	8	9	5	5	–	10	13	50
29–30 Apr	LRI+P4A	Maariv	26	28	(1.5%)	9	—N/a	(1.4%)	—N/a	(2.8%)	–	8	7	8	5	5	(1.4%)	10	14	50
29–30 Apr	LRI+P4A	Maariv	?	?	–	?	—N/a	–	—N/a	5 (4.5%)		?	?	?	5	5	–	?	?	47

==== Together–Yashar–Beiteinu mergers ====
Fieldwork date	Polling firm	Publisher	Likud	Together		Yashar	Yisrael Beiteinu	RZP	Otzma	Blue & White	Zionist Home	Shas	UTJ	Joint List			Dems	Gov.
Fieldwork date	Polling firm	Publisher	Likud	Bennett 2026	Yesh Atid	Yashar	Yisrael Beiteinu	RZP	Otzma	Blue & White	Zionist Home	Shas	UTJ	Ra'am	Hadash –Ta'al	Balad	Dems	Gov.
8–9 Jul	LRI+P4A	Maariv	21	18		22	10	4	8	(1.4%)	(2.9%)	8	8	5	6	(1.8%)	10	50
8–9 Jul	LRI+P4A	Maariv	TBA	35 (Note: Led by Bennett)			TBA	(2.4%)	TBA	—	5	TBA	TBA	5	6	—	TBA	48
8–9 Jul	LRI+P4A	Maariv	22	39 (Note: Led by Eisenkot)			11	(2.9%)	8	(1.0%)	4	8	8	5	6	(1.8%)	9	46
17–18 Jun	LRI+P4A	Maariv	21	20		21	10	4	8	(1.7%)	(2.1%)	9	7	4	6	(1.8%)	10	49
17–18 Jun	LRI+P4A	Maariv	23	34			12	4	8	(1.7%)	(1.5%)	9	7	5	6	(1.5%)	13	51
17–18 Jun	LRI+P4A	Maariv	23	37			11	4	8	(1.5%)	(1.3%)	8	7	5	6	(1.8%)	12	50
19–20 May	LRI+P4A	Maariv	24	25		15	9	4	8	(1.5%)	(1.4%)	8	7	5	5	(1.5%)	10	51
19–20 May	LRI+P4A	Maariv	26	44 (Note: Led by Lieberman)				4	8	(2.8%)	(1.6%)	8	7	5	5	(1.8%)	13	53
19–20 May	LRI+P4A	Maariv	25	46				4	8	(1.8%)	(1.7%)	8	7	5	5	(1.2%)	12	52
19–20 May	LRI+P4A	Maariv	24	49				4	8	(1.8%)	(1.2%)	8	7	5	5	(1.7%)	10	51
14 May	Midgam R&C	HaHadashot 12	26	24		15	9	(2.8%)	9	(2.7%)	(1.0%)	9	8	5	5	(1.9%)	10	52
14 May	Midgam R&C	HaHadashot 12	27	38			9	–	9	–	–	9	8	5	5	–	10	53
13 May	Kantar	Israel Hayom	26	24		16	8	(2.9%)	9	(2.7%)	(3.0%)	9	7	5	6	(1.8%)	10	51
13 May	Kantar	Israel Hayom	27	22		24		(2.9%)	10	(2.6%)	(2.4%)	9	7	5	6	(1.8%)	10	53
13 May	Kantar	Israel Hayom	27	45				(2.9%)	10	(2.6%)	(2.6%)	9	7	11	5	(1.8%)	–	53
13 May	Kantar	Kan 11	26	25		15	9	–	9	–	–	9	7	5	5	–	10	51
13 May	Kantar	Kan 11	?	23		25		?	?	?	?	?	?	?	?	?	?	?
12–13 May	LRI+P4A	Maariv	25	26		16	9	(2.1%)	8	(2.1%)	(2.6%)	9	7	5	5	(1.4%)	10	49
12–13 May	LRI+P4A	Maariv	26	49				(2.6%)	8	(2.6%)	(1.8%)	9	7	5	5	(1.7%)	11	50
7 May	Midgam R&C	HaHadashot 12	25	25		14	9	(2.9%)	9	(1.5%)	(1.0%)	9	8	5	5	(0.8%)	11	51
7 May	Midgam R&C	HaHadashot 12	24	24		25		–	9	–	–	9	8	5	5	–	11	50
7 May	Yossi Tatika	Zman Yisrael	26	26		14	9	–	7	4	–	9	8	5	4	–	8	50
7 May	Yossi Tatika	Zman Yisrael	25	24		26		–	8	4	–	9	8	5	4	–	7	50
30 Apr	Kantar	Israel Hayom	28	23		16	9	(2.7%)	9	(1.6%)	(2.6%)	8	7	5	6	(1.9%)	9	52
30 Apr	Kantar	Israel Hayom	29	40			8	(2.7%)	9	(1.9%)	(2.6%)	8	7	5	6	(1.6%)	8	53
30 Apr	Yossi Tatika	Zman Yisrael	26	28		15	10	–	7	–	–	9	8	5	4	–	8	50
30 Apr	Yossi Tatika	Zman Yisrael	24	39			9	10		5		9	7	5	4	–	8	50
27 Apr	LRI+P4A	Walla	28	27		15	8	–	8	–	–	8	7	5	5	–	9	51
27 Apr	LRI+P4A	Walla	28	41			?	–	8	–	–	8	7	5	5	–	?	51
26–27 Apr	Direct Polls	i24 News	33	24		8	6	4	6	–	–	11	8	7	4	–	9	62
26–27 Apr	Direct Polls	i24 News	33	30			8	4	6	–	–	11	8	7	4	–	9	62
6–7 Apr	LRI+P4A	Maariv	26	26		15	9	(2.5%)	9	(1.9%)	(2.6%)	8	7	5	5	(1.8%)	10	50
6–7 Apr	LRI+P4A	Maariv	25	24		27		(2.8%)	9	(2.7%)	(1.6%)	8	7	5	5	(1.8%)	10	49
6–7 Apr	LRI+P4A	Maariv	26	24		25		(2.7%)	9	(2.7%)	(2.7%)	8	7	5	5	(1.6%)	11	50
2–3 Jul 25	LRI+P4A	Maariv	27	24	9	—N/a	9	(2.6%)	7	6	–	9	8	5	5	(1.9%)	11	51
2–3 Jul 25	LRI+P4A	Maariv	27	18	8	17		4	7	4	–	9	7	5	5	(1.9%)	9	54

==== Bennett–Yashar–Yesh Atid, BW–Reservists, RZ–Otzma mergers, Joint List ====
Fieldwork date	Polling firm	Publisher	Likud	Bennett 2026	Yashar	Yesh Atid	RZP	Otzma	Blue & White	Reserv.	Shas	UTJ	Yisrael Beiteinu	Joint List			Dems	Gov.
Fieldwork date	Polling firm	Publisher	Likud	Bennett 2026	Yashar	Yesh Atid	RZP	Otzma	Blue & White	Reserv.	Shas	UTJ	Yisrael Beiteinu	Ra'am	Hadash –Ta'al	Balad	Dems	Gov.
23 Apr	Midgam R&C	Channel 12	25	21	14	7	(2.7%)	9	(0.8%)	(1.3%)	9	7	8	5	5	(0.8%)	10	50
23 Apr	Midgam R&C	Channel 12	25	35		7	–	9	–	–	9	7	8	5	5	–	10	50
25–26 Feb	Yossi Tatika	Zman Yisrael	27	18	12	7	–	8	–	–	10	8	10	6	5	–	9	52
25–26 Feb	Yossi Tatika	Zman Yisrael	25	11	22		9		6		9	7	9	14			8	50
25–26 Feb	LRI+P4A	Maariv	26	19	14	8	(2.2%)	9	(2.8%)	(1.9%)	8	7	8	5	5	(1.5%)	11	50
25–26 Feb	LRI+P4A	Maariv	26	32		8	(2.5%)	9	(2.0%)	(2.0%)	8	7	8	5	5	(1.8%)	12	50
25–26 Feb	LRI+P4A	Maariv	26	33		7	(2.5%)	9	(2.3%)	(1.3%)	8	7	8	5	5	(1.8%)	12	50
18–19 Feb	Yossi Tatika	Zman Yisrael	27	18	9	7	–	7	4	–	10	8	10	6	5	–	9	52
18–19 Feb	Yossi Tatika	Zman Yisrael	26	27		6	9		6		9	7	9	13			8	50
17 Feb	MM+SN	Channel 13	25	22	9	9	(2.4%)	8	(1.6%)	(1.3%)	10	7	8	15			7	50
17 Feb	MM+SN	Channel 13	25	29		7	?	?	–	–	?	?	?	15			?	52
28–29 Jan	Lazar	Maariv	27	7	22	10	(2.2%)	8	(2.7%)	(1.8%)	8	7	9	13			9	50
28–29 Jan	Lazar	Maariv	28	37			(1.8%)	9	(2.6%)	(1.9%)	8	7	9	13			9	52
21–22 Jan	Yossi Tatika	Zman Yisrael	25	7	18	8	4	6	4	–	10	8	10	6	5	–	9	53
21–22 Jan	Yossi Tatika	Zman Yisrael	25	36			4	8	4	–	9	8	9	6	5	–	8	54
4 Dec 25	MM+SN	Channel 13	23	19	6	9	4	9	(2.5%)	4	10	6	10	4	6	(2.1%)	10	52
4 Dec 25	MM+SN	Channel 13	22	19	?	?	?	?	?	4	?	?	?	16			9	49
18 Sep25	Midgam R&C	HaHadashot 12	24	21	10	9	4	5	(2.6%)	(2.7%)	9	7	11	5	5	–	10	49
18 Sep25	Midgam R&C	HaHadashot 12	24	30		11	4	5	–	–	9	7	10	5	5	–	10	49
18 Sep25	Midgam R&C	HaHadashot 12	24	21	17		4	5	4	–	9	7	10	5	5	0	9	49
29 Aug25	TrendZone	–	32	4	–	9	–	6	12	–	9	7	21	6	5	–	9	54
29 Aug25	TrendZone	–	?	37		?	?	?	?	?	?	?	?	?	?	?	?	?
2–3 Jul25	LRI+P4A	Maariv	27	24	–	9	(2.6%)	7	6	(1.9%)	9	8	9	5	5	–	11	51
2–3 Jul25	LRI+P4A	Maariv	27	25		9	4	6	4	(1.9%)	9	8	8	5	5	–	10	54
2–3 Jul25	LRI+P4A	Maariv	28	21	15		(2.6%)	7	4	—N/a	9	7	9	5	5	(1.9%)	10	51

==== Bennett, Cohen, Gallant, Hendel, and Sa'ar parties, Labor–Meretz merger ====
Fieldwork date	Polling firm	Publisher	Likud	Yesh Atid	RZP	Otzma	National Unity	New Hope	Shas	UTJ	Yisrael Beiteinu	Ra'am	Hadash –Ta'al	Dems		Balad	Bennett	Cohen	Gallant	Hendel	Gov.
Fieldwork date	Polling firm	Publisher	Likud	Yesh Atid	RZP	Otzma	National Unity	New Hope	Shas	UTJ	Yisrael Beiteinu	Ra'am	Hadash –Ta'al	Labor	Meretz	Balad	Bennett	Cohen	Gallant	Hendel	Gov.
18 Nov 24	Midgam R&C	HaHadashot 12	26	15	(2.8%)	8	19	(0.9%)	9	8	13	5	5	12		(2.4%)	—N/a	—N/a	—N/a	—N/a	51
18 Nov 24	Midgam R&C	HaHadashot 12	26	14	–	7	19	–	9	8	12	5	5	12		–	—N/a	—N/a	8	—N/a	50
8 Nov 24	LRI+P4A	Maariv	24	15	(2.9%)	8	19	(1.9%)	10	7	14	5	5	13		(1.6%)	—N/a	—N/a	—N/a	—N/a	49
8 Nov 24	LRI+P4A	Maariv	19	11	–	7	11	–	10	7	7	5	5	9		–	23	—N/a	6	—N/a	43
16 May 24	Midgam R&C	HaHadashot 12	19	16	4	9	29	(1.0%)	10	8	11	5	5	(1.8%)	4	(2.5%)	—N/a	—N/a	—N/a	—N/a	50
16 May 24	Midgam R&C	HaHadashot 12	19	15	4	9	25	–	10	8	10	5	5	–	4	–	—N/a	—N/a	6	—N/a	56
13 Mar 24	CF+MP+SN	Channel 13	17	14	4	9	34	6	9	7	8	4	4	–	4	–	—N/a	—N/a	—N/a	—N/a	46
13 Mar 24	CF+MP+SN	Channel 13	15	10	4	7	21	–	9	6	8	4	4	–	4	–	18	11	—N/a	—N/a	41
13 Mar 24	Midgam R&C	HaHadashot 12	18	13	(2.9%)	8	33	5	11	7	11	5	5	(1.8%)	4	(1.7%)	—N/a	—N/a	—N/a	—N/a	44
13 Mar 24	Midgam R&C	HaHadashot 12	18	12	–	8	28	(2.4%)	11	7	10	5	5	–	4	–	12	—N/a	—N/a	—N/a	44
7 March 2024	LRI+P4A	The Jerusalem Post	18	10	4	9	41		10	6	9	4	5	4	(2.9%)	(1.8%)	—N/a	—N/a	—N/a	—N/a	47
7 March 2024	LRI+P4A	The Jerusalem Post	16	9	(2.9%)	9	28	(1.8%)	10	6	6	5	5	7		(1.8%)	9	5	—N/a	5	41
3 March 2024	CF+MP+SN	Channel 13	17	12	5	9	39		9	7	9	5	4	–	4	–	—N/a	—N/a	—N/a	—N/a	47
3 March 2024	CF+MP+SN	Channel 13	16	9	5	9	31		9	7	8	5	4	8		–	—N/a	—N/a	9	—N/a	55
11 Feb 24	CF+MP+SN	Channel 13	18	13	6	8	37		9	7	10	4	4	–	4	–	—N/a	—N/a	—N/a	—N/a	48
11 Feb 24	CF+MP+SN	Channel 13	18	13	6	8	32	5	9	7	10	4	4	–	4	–	—N/a	—N/a	—N/a	—N/a	48
11 Jan 24	Midgam R&C	HaHadashot 12	18	14	4	8	35		11	7	9	5	5	(1.6%)	4	(2.0%)	—N/a	—N/a	—N/a	—N/a	48
11 Jan 24	Midgam R&C	HaHadashot 12	15	10	4	7	25		10	7	7	5	5	9		–	10	6	—N/a	—N/a	43
28 Dec 23	CF+MP+SN	Channel 13	16	15	5	8	38		9	7	8	6	4	–	4	–	—N/a	—N/a	—N/a	—N/a	45
28 Dec 23	CF+MP+SN	Channel 13	15	10	–	–	23		–	–	–	–	–	7		–	15	6	—N/a	—N/a	–
21 Dec 23	Direct Polls	Channel 14	27	14	4	8	28		10	7	11	6	5	(0.5%)	(2.9%)	(1.6%)	—N/a	—N/a	—N/a	—N/a	56
21 Dec 23	Direct Polls	Channel 14	22	7	4	6	17		9	7	6	5	5	14		(1.7%)	10	8	—N/a	—N/a	48
18 Dec 23	Midgam R&C	HaHadashot 12	18	15	(2.4%)	8	37		11	7	9	5	5	(1.8%)	5	(1.9%)	—N/a	—N/a	—N/a	—N/a	44
18 Dec 23	Midgam R&C	HaHadashot 12	15	10	(2.0%)	7	23		11	7	6	5	5	9		(1.8%)	13	9	—N/a	—N/a	40
7 December 2023	Kantar	Attila Somfalvi	–	–	–	–	–		–	–	–	–	–	–	–	–	—N/a	—N/a	—N/a	—N/a	–
7 December 2023	Kantar	Attila Somfalvi	17	12	4	6	29		9	7	8	4	6	8		–	10	—N/a	—N/a	—N/a	44
30 November 2023	Kantar	Attila Somfalvi	–	–	–	–	–		–	–	–	–	–	–	–	–	—N/a	—N/a	—N/a	—N/a	–
30 November 2023	Kantar	Attila Somfalvi	18	12	4	7	28		9	7	7	5	6	7		–	12	—N/a	—N/a	—N/a	45
16 Nov 23	Midgam R&C	HaHadashot 12	17	15	4	7	36		10	7	9	5	5	(1.5%)	5	(1.7%)	—N/a	—N/a	—N/a	—N/a	45
16 Nov 23	Midgam R&C	HaHadashot 12	17	14	(2.8%)	7	25		10	7	8	5	5	–	5	–	17	—N/a	—N/a	—N/a	41
16 Nov 23	Midgam R&C	HaHadashot 12	16	16	(2.7%)	7	29		10	7	8	5	5	–	5	–	—N/a	12	—N/a	—N/a	40
14 November 2023	Kantar	Attila Somfalvi	–	–	–	–	–		–	–	–	–	–	–	–	–	—N/a	—N/a	—N/a	—N/a	–
14 November 2023	Kantar	Attila Somfalvi	16	12	4	6	27		9	7	6	5	6	8		–	14	—N/a	—N/a	—N/a	42
1–2 Nov 23	LRI+P4A	Maariv	18	15	4	5	39		8	7	8	5	5	(1.4%)	6	(1.0%)	—N/a	—N/a	—N/a	—N/a	42
1–2 Nov 23	LRI+P4A	Maariv	17	13	4	5	28		7	7	6	5	5	–	6	–	17	—N/a	—N/a	—N/a	40
20–21 Sep 23	LRI+P4A	Maariv	26	16	5	5	31		10	7	6	5	5	(1.4%)	4	(1.7%)	—N/a	—N/a	—N/a	—N/a	53
20–21 Sep 23	LRI+P4A	Maariv	26	14	–	–	26		–	–	6	–	–	–	–	–	—N/a	—N/a	—N/a	8	52
3 Sep 23	Lazar	The Jerusalem Post	–	–	–	–	–		–	–	–	–	–	–	–	–	—N/a	—N/a	—N/a	—N/a	–
3 Sep 23	Lazar	The Jerusalem Post	26	16	5	4	26		10	7	4	5	5	–	5	–	—N/a	—N/a	—N/a	7	52
1 Jun 23	Midgam R&C	Arutz Sheva	26	18	5	6	28		10	7	6	6	4	–	4	–	—N/a	—N/a	—N/a	—N/a	54
1 Jun 23	Midgam R&C	Arutz Sheva	25	15	5	6	25		10	7	5	6	4	–	4	–	8	—N/a	—N/a	—N/a	53
1 Jun 23	Midgam R&C	Arutz Sheva	24	17	5	6	27		10	7	6	6	4	–	4	–	—N/a	—N/a	—N/a	4	52
30 Apr 23	CF+MP+SN	Channel 13	22	18	6	5	28		9	7	6	5	5	–	5	4	—N/a	—N/a	—N/a	—N/a	49
30 Apr 23	CF+MP+SN	Channel 13	21	17	5	5	24		8	7	6	5	5	–	5	4	8	—N/a	—N/a	—N/a	46
16 Apr 23	Midgam R&C	HaHadashot 12	24	20	11		28		10	7	5	5	5	(2.6%)	5	(2.8%)	—N/a	—N/a	—N/a	—N/a	52
16 Apr 23	Midgam R&C	HaHadashot 12	24	18	9		24		10	7	5	5	5	(2.6%)	5	(2.8%)	8	—N/a	—N/a	—N/a	50
16 Apr 23	Midgam R&C	HaHadashot 12	19	15	4	10	22		10	8	13	5	5	9		(2.6%)	—N/a	—N/a	—N/a	—N/a	51
16 Apr 23	Midgam R&C	HaHadashot 12	17	15	–	9	18		10	8	11	5	5	9		–	9	4	—N/a	—N/a	44
16 Apr 23	Midgam R&C	HaHadashot 12	22	19	11		25		10	7	5	5	5	(2.6%)	5	(2.8%)	—N/a	6	—N/a	—N/a	50
22–23 Mar 23	Panels Politics	Maariv	28	26	5	6	19		10	7	5	4	5	(2.6%)	5	–	—N/a	—N/a	—N/a	—N/a	56
22–23 Mar 23	Panels Politics	Maariv	27	22	5	6	14		10	7	4	5	5	4	5	–	—N/a	—N/a	—N/a	6	55

==== Hendel–Bennett merger ====
Fieldwork date	Polling firm	Publisher	Likud	Yesh Atid	RZP	Otzma	National Unity	Shas	UTJ	Hendel & Bennett	Yisrael Beiteinu	Ra'am	Hadash –Ta'al	Labor	Meretz	Balad	Gov.
1 Jun 23	Midgam R&C	Arutz Sheva	26	18	5	6	28	10	7	—N/a	6	6	4	–	4	–	54
1 Jun 23	Midgam R&C	Arutz Sheva	25	15	5	5	25	10	7	9	5	6	4	–	4	–	52

==== Yariv Levin party ====
Fieldwork date	Polling firm	Publisher	Likud	Yesh Atid	RZP	Otzma	National Unity	Shas	UTJ	Levin	Yisrael Beiteinu	Ra'am	Hadash –Ta'al	Labor	Meretz	Balad	Gov.
24 May 23	CF+MP+SN	Channel 13	25	18	5	4	29	9	7	—N/a	4	6	5	–	4	4	50
24 May 23	CF+MP+SN	Channel 13	22	18	5	4	26	9	7	6	4	6	5	–	4	4	53

==== Reform protest party, right-wing liberal party ====
Fieldwork date	Polling firm	Publisher	Likud	Yesh Atid	RZP	Otzma	National Unity	Shas	UTJ	Yisrael Beiteinu	Ra'am	Hadash –Ta'al	Labor	Meretz	Balad	Protest Party	Right-wing liberal party	Gov.
24–25 Jan 24	Lazar	The Jerusalem Post	16	13	4	8	40	9	7	9	5	5	(1.4%)	4	(1.8%)	—N/a	—N/a	44
24–25 Jan 24	Lazar	The Jerusalem Post	16	12	4	8	36	9	7	9	5	5	–	–	–	9 (Note: Brothers in Arms)	—N/a	44
13–14 Sep 23	LRI+P4A	Maariv	27	16	5	5	31	9	7	6	5	5	( 1.7%)	4	(1.5%)	—N/a	—N/a	53
13–14 Sep 23	LRI+P4A	Maariv	26	14	5	5	25	9	7	5	5	5	(1.1%)	(2.4%)	(1.2%)	5	9	52
10 Aug 23	SF+DP	Channel 14	–	–	–	–	–	–	–	–	–	–	–	–	–	—N/a	—N/a	–
10 Aug 23	SF+DP	Channel 14	29	10	4	4	21	10	7	6	5	5	(1.2%)	(2.2%)	(2.6%)	12	7	54
9–10 Aug 23	Lazar	Maariv	28	16	6	4	29	9	7	6	5	5	(1.8%)	5	(2.2%)	—N/a	—N/a	54
9–10 Aug 23	Lazar	Maariv	27	13	5	4	25	9	7	5	5	5	(1.3%)	4	(1.6%)	11	—N/a	52
10 Sep 23	Midgam R&C	HaHadashot 12	26	18	9		29	10	7	6	5	5	(2.8%)	5	(1.7%)	—N/a	—N/a	52
10 Sep 23	Midgam R&C	HaHadashot 12	26	15	9		26	10	7	5	5	5	(2.4%)	4	(1.7%)	8	—N/a	52
4 Aug 23	Midgam R&C	HaHadashot 12	26	20	9		28	10	7	6	5	5	(1.6%)	4	(1.9%)	—N/a	—N/a	52
4 Aug 23	Midgam R&C	HaHadashot 12	26	17	9		26	10	7	5	5	5	(1.1%)	(2.7%)	(1.9%)	10	—N/a	52
7 May 23	CF+MP+SN	Channel 13	24	19	7	4	29	10	7	6	5	5	–	4	–	—N/a	—N/a	52
7 May 23	CF+MP+SN	Channel 13	24	18	7	4	29	10	7	6	5	5	–	–	–	5	—N/a	52
22–23 Mar 23	Panels Politics	Maariv	28	26	5	6	19	10	7	5	4	5	(2.6%)	5	–	—N/a	—N/a	56
22–23 Mar 23	Panels Politics	Maariv	27	24	5	6	16	10	7	4	4	5	–	4	–	—N/a	8	55
16 Mar 23	Midgam R&C	HaHadashot 12	29	23	12		17	10	7	6	6	5	(3.0%)	5	(1.0%)	—N/a	—N/a	58
16 Mar 23	Midgam R&C	HaHadashot 12	26	21	12		14	10	7	5	5	5	–	5	–	—N/a	10	55

==== Bennett–Yisrael Beiteinu merger ====
Fieldwork date	Polling firm	Publisher	Likud	Yesh Atid	RZP	Otzma	National Unity	Shas	UTJ	New Hope	Yisrael Beiteinu	Bennett 2026 (Note: Polls before 1 April 2025 refer to it as "Party of Naftali Bennett".)	Ra'am	Hadash –Ta'al	Balad	Dems	Yashar	Gov.
29 Aug	TrendZone	–	32	4	–	6	–	9	7	–	9	21	6	5	–	12	9	54
29 Aug	TrendZone	–	?	?	–	?	–	?	?	–	35		?	?	–	?	?	?
17 Sep 24	Kantar	Kan 11	–	–	–	–	–	–	–	–	–	–	–	–	–	–	—N/a	–
17 Sep 24	Kantar	Kan 11	20	12	4	9	15	10	7	–	28		5	6	–	8	—N/a	46
16 Sep 24	MM+SN	Channel 13	21	13	5	9	22	10	7	–	14	—N/a	6	5	–	8	—N/a	52
16 Sep 24	MM+SN	Channel 13	19	9	4	9	14	10	7	–	34		4	4	–	6	—N/a	49
4 Sep 24	Kantar	Kan 11	22	14	4	8	23	10	7	–	14	—N/a	5	5	–	8	—N/a	51
4 Sep 24	Kantar	Kan 11	20	12	–	8	18	10	7	27			5	5	–	8	—N/a	45
22 Aug 24	Midgam R&C	HaHadashot 12	22	15	(2.8%)	8	22	10	8	(2.2%)	14	—N/a	5	5	(2.5%)	11	—N/a	48
22 Aug 24	Midgam R&C	HaHadashot 12	20	12	(2.5%)	8	15	10	8	(0.9%)	26		5	5	(2.5%)	11	—N/a	46

==== New Hope–Yisrael Beiteinu right-wing party ====
Scenarios where Avigdor Lieberman, Naftali Bennett, Yossi Cohen, Ayelet Shaked and Gideon Sa'ar creates a united right-wing party under a New Hope–Yisrael Beiteinu merger.

Fieldwork date	Polling firm	Publisher	Likud	Yesh Atid	RZP	Otzma	National Unity	Shas	UTJ	New Hope	Yisrael Beiteinu	Ra'am	Hadash –Ta'al	Dems		Balad	Reserv.	Gov.
Fieldwork date	Polling firm	Publisher	Likud	Yesh Atid	RZP	Otzma	National Unity	Shas	UTJ	New Hope	Yisrael Beiteinu	Ra'am	Hadash –Ta'al	Labor	Meretz	Balad	Reserv.	Gov.
10–11 Jul 24	LRI+P4A	Maariv	20	13	4	10	24	9	7	(1.7%)	14	5	5	9		(1.4%)	—N/a	50
10–11 Jul 24	LRI+P4A	Maariv	18	12	4	9	16	9	7	27		5	5	8		(1.7%)	—N/a	47
3–4 Jul 24	LRI+P4A	Maariv	–	–	–	–	–	–	–	–	–	–	–	–	–	–	—N/a	–
3–4 Jul 24	LRI+P4A	Maariv	19	12	–	9	16	9	7	29		5	5	9		–	—N/a	44
3–4 Jul 24	LRI+P4A	Maariv	18	11	–	8	15	9	7	27		5	5	9		–	6	42
28 Jun 24	LRI+P4A	Maariv	21	15	(2.4%)	9	24	10	7	(1.8%)	14	5	5	6	4	(1.7%)	—N/a	47
28 Jun 24	LRI+P4A	Maariv	19	13	–	8	17	10	7	27		5	5	5	4	–	—N/a	44

==== New Hope–Yisrael Beiteinu–Bennett–Cohen, National Unity–Yesh Atid, Labor–Meretz mergers ====
Fieldwork date	Polling firm	Publisher	Likud	RZP	Otzma	Yesh Atid	National Unity	New Hope	Bennett +Cohen	Yisrael Beiteinu	Shas	UTJ	Ra'am	Hadash –Ta'al	Dems		Balad	Gov.
Fieldwork date	Polling firm	Publisher	Likud	RZP	Otzma	Yesh Atid	National Unity	New Hope	Bennett +Cohen	Yisrael Beiteinu	Shas	UTJ	Ra'am	Hadash –Ta'al	Labor	Meretz	Balad	Gov.
7 July 24	MM+SN	Channel 13	21	4	10	13	25	(2.2%)	—N/a	12	10	8	4	4	9		(2.7%)	53
7 July 24	MM+SN	Channel 13	18	4	10	21		32			10	8	4	4	9		–	50
24 Jun 24	Midgam R&C	HaHadashot 12	20	(2.0%)	9	15	23	(2.8%)	—N/a	14	10	8	5	5	11		(2.6%)	47
24 Jun 24	Midgam R&C	HaHadashot 12	18	–	8	13	17	25			10	8	5	5	11		–	44
23 Jun 24	MM+SN	Channel 13	21	5	10	12	25	(2.4%)	—N/a	11	9	8	4	5	10		(2.9%)	53
23 Jun 24	MM+SN	Channel 13	18	4	8	10	14	34			9	7	4	4	8		–	46
10 Jun 24	Midgam R&C	HaHadashot 12	19	4	10	15	22	(1.6%)	—N/a	13	10	8	5	5	9		(2.6%)	51
10 Jun 24	Midgam R&C	HaHadashot 12	18	–	9	15	18	23			10	8	5	5	9		–	45
10 Jun 24	MM+SN	Channel 13	20	5	9	13	25	(2.6%)	—N/a	12	7	5	5	10	9		(2.8%)	51
10 Jun 24	MM+SN	Channel 13	16	5	8	8	20	24		7	9	6	5	5	7		–	44
29–30 May 24	LRI+P4A	Maariv	22	4	10	14	25	(2.3%)	—N/a	10	7	10	4	5	5	4	(1.8%)	53
29–30 May 24	LRI+P4A	Maariv	20	4	7	12	18	–	21		10	10	4	6	4	4	–	51
29 May 24	Midgam R&C	HaHadashot 12	21	5	9	13	25	(2.5%)	—N/a	10	10	7	5	5	10		(2.0%)	52
29 May 24	Midgam R&C	HaHadashot 12	21	4	9	12	21	16			10	7	5	5	10		(2.0%)	51
30 Apr 24	Midgam R&C	HaHadashot 12	18	4	10	15	31	(2.2%)	—N/a	10	10	8	5	5	(2.2%)	4	(2.3%)	50
30 Apr 24	Midgam R&C	HaHadashot 12	16	4	8	11	22	18		7	10	8	5	5	6	–	–	46
21 Apr 24	Midgam Project & Stat Net	Channel 13	20	7	9	15	30	–	—N/a	11	8	7	4	5	4	–	–	51
21 Apr 24	Midgam Project & Stat Net	Channel 13	15	5	8	8	15	32		7	6	6	4	5	9		–	40
13 Mar 24	Midgam R&C	HaHadashot 12	18	(2.9%)	8	13	33	5	—N/a	11	7	11	5	5	(1.8%)	4	(1.7%)	44
13 Mar 24	Midgam R&C	HaHadashot 12	17	–	7	12	25	17		10	11	7	5	5	–	4	–	42

=== Alternative leadership ===
==== Netanyahu retirement ====
Fieldwork date	Polling firm	Publisher	Government bloc					Other Jewish parties						Joint List			Gov.
Fieldwork date	Polling firm	Publisher	Likud	RZP	Otzma	Shas	UTJ	Together	Yashar	Blue & White	Reserv.	Yisrael Beiteinu	Dems	Ra'am	Hadash –Ta'al	Balad	Gov.
30 Apr 26	Yossi Tatika	Zman Yisrael	26	–	7	9	8	28	15	–	–	10	8	5	4	–	50
30 Apr 26	Yossi Tatika	Zman Yisrael	21	5	8	9	8	27	15	–	–	10	8	5	4	–	51

==== Eisenkot leads National Unity ====
Date	Polling firm	Publisher	Likud	Yesh Atid	RZP	Otzma	Noam	National Unity	Shas	UTJ	Yisrael Beiteinu	Ra'am	Hadash –Ta'al	Labor	Meretz	Balad	Gov.
30 Jan 24	Midgam R&C	HaHadashot 12	18	14	4	8	–	37	10	7	8	5	5	(1.6%)	4	(2.3%)	47
30 Jan 24	Midgam R&C	HaHadashot 12	18	13	4	8	–	38	10	7	8	5	5	(1.6%)	4	(2.3%)	47
21 Jan 24	CF+MP+SN	Channel 13	16	14	6	8	–	37	9	7	9	5	5	–	4	–	46
21 Jan 24	CF+MP+SN	Channel 13	16	13	5	8	–	39	9	7	9	5	5	–	4	–	45

==== Eisenkot leads National Unity, Bennett party ====
Date	Polling firm	Publisher	Government bloc								Other parties							
Date	Polling firm	Publisher	Likud	RZP	Otzma	Noam	Shas	UTJ	New Hope	Gov. total	Yesh Atid	National Unity	Yisrael Beiteinu	Naftali Bennett	Ra'am	Dems	Hadash –Ta'al	Balad
17 February 2025	Midgam R&C	HaHadashot 12	25	5	7	–	9	8	(1.3%)	54	13	17	12	—N/a	5	14	5	(1.4%)
17 February 2025	Midgam R&C	HaHadashot 12	23	4	7	–	9	8	–	51	9	8	7	23	5	12	5	–

==== Likud leadership ====
Date	Polling firm	Publisher	Likud				Yesh Atid	RZP	Otzma	Noam	National Unity	Shas	UTJ	Yisrael Beiteinu	Ra'am	Hadash –Ta'al	Labor	Meretz	Balad	Gov.
Date	Polling firm	Publisher	Netanyahu	Barkat	Cohen	Gallant	Yesh Atid	RZP	Otzma	Noam	National Unity	Shas	UTJ	Yisrael Beiteinu	Ra'am	Hadash –Ta'al	Labor	Meretz	Balad	Gov.
21 Jan 24	CF+MP+SN	Channel 13	16	—N/a	—N/a	—N/a	14	6	8	–	37	9	7	9	5	5	–	4	–	46
21 Jan 24	CF+MP+SN	Channel 13	—N/a	21	—N/a	—N/a	13	5	8	–	35	9	7	8	5	5	–	4	–	50
28 Dec 23	CF+MP+SN	Channel 13	16	—N/a	—N/a	—N/a	15	8	5	–	38	9	7	8	6	4	–	4	–	45
28 Dec 23	CF+MP+SN	Channel 13	—N/a	—N/a	23	—N/a	14	8	5	–	33	9	7	7	6	4	–	4	–	52
6–7 Sep 23	LRI+P4A	Maariv	26	—N/a	—N/a	—N/a	17	6	4	–	30	10	7	5	6	5	(1.8%)	4	(1.6%)	53
6–7 Sep 23	LRI+P4A	Maariv	—N/a	27	—N/a	—N/a	16	6	5	–	28	10	7	5	6	5	–	5	–	55
6–7 Sep 23	LRI+P4A	Maariv	—N/a	—N/a	—N/a	26	17	7	5	–	27	10	7	5	6	5	–	5	–	55

==== Likud leadership, Bennett party, Labor–Meretz merger ====
Date	Polling firm	Publisher	Likud			Yesh Atid	RZP	Otzma	Noam	National Unity	Shas	UTJ	Bennett	Yisrael Beiteinu	Ra'am	Hadash –Ta'al	Labor	Meretz	Balad	Gov.
Date	Polling firm	Publisher	Cohen	Barkat	Gallant	Yesh Atid	RZP	Otzma	Noam	National Unity	Shas	UTJ	Bennett	Yisrael Beiteinu	Ra'am	Hadash –Ta'al	Labor	Meretz	Balad	Gov.
30 November 2023	Kantar	Attila Somfalvi	–	–	–	–	–	–	–	–	–	–	—N/a	–	–	–	–	–	–	–
30 November 2023	Kantar	Attila Somfalvi	21	—N/a	—N/a	13	4	8	–	26	9	7	8	6	5	6	7		–	49
30 November 2023	Kantar	Attila Somfalvi	–	–	–	–	–	–	–	–	–	–	—N/a	–	–	–	–	–	–	–
30 November 2023	Kantar	Attila Somfalvi	—N/a	18	—N/a	13	4	10	–	27	9	7	8	6	5	6	7		–	48
30 November 2023	Kantar	Attila Somfalvi	–	–	–	–	–	–	–	–	–	–	—N/a	–	–	–	–	–	–	–
30 November 2023	Kantar	Attila Somfalvi	—N/a	—N/a	17	12	4	11	–	27	9	7	9	6	5	6	7		–	48

== Arab voters ==
Some surveys only polled the Arab population and estimated the strength of each Arab party and their combinations. If predominantly Jewish parties were polled, their number will be italic.

Regular poll
Scenario poll

Fieldwork date	Polling firm	Publisher	Sample size	Segalovitz	Joint List				A Place for Us All	Other parties						National camp	
Fieldwork date	Polling firm	Publisher	Sample size	Segalovitz	Ra'am	Hadash–Ta'al		Balad	A Place for Us All	Dems	Yisrael Beiteinu	Together		National Unity	Yashar	Likud	Shas
Fieldwork date	Polling firm	Publisher	Sample size	Segalovitz	Ra'am	Ta'al	Hadash	Balad	A Place for Us All	Dems	Yisrael Beiteinu	Yesh Atid	Bennett 2026	Blue & White	Yashar	Likud	Shas
27 Aug – 1 Sep 2026	Afkar	Nazareth-Mashur W. Publishing Ltd.	800	5		9			(1.6)	1.1	0.23	0.45		0.03	0.45	0.63	0
27 Aug – 1 Sep 2026	Afkar	Nazareth-Mashur W. Publishing Ltd.	800	4		12				0.82	0.23	0.39		0	0.39	0.42	0
27 Aug – 1 Sep 2026	Afkar	Nazareth-Mashur W. Publishing Ltd.	800	7 (Note: with A Place for Us All)		9			– (Note: with Ra'am)	0.9	0.2	0.5		0	0.4	0.5	0.1
26 Aug 2026	MP+TM+SN+A	Channel 13		—N/a	5	10			–	–	–	–		–	–	–	–
26 Aug 2026	MP+TM+SN+A	Channel 13		5		9			–	–	–	–		–	–	–	–
24 Aug 2026	Midgam R&C	HaHadashot 12		—N/a	4	7			–	–	–	–		–	–	–	–
24 Aug 2026	Midgam R&C	HaHadashot 12		4		7			–	–	–	–		–	–	–	–
23 Aug 2026	Kantar	Kan 11		—N/a	5	7			–	–	–	–		–	–	–	–
23 Aug 2026	Kantar	Kan 11		5		7			–	–	–	–		–	–	–	–
12–13 Aug 2026	LRI+P4A	Maariv		—N/a	5	6		(1.8)	–	–	–	–		–	–	–	–
12–13 Aug 2026	LRI+P4A	Maariv		6		8			–	–	–	–		–	–	–	–
12 Aug 2026	MP+TM+SN+A	Channel 13		—N/a	5	6		(1.44)	–	–	–	–		–	–	–	–
12 Aug 2026	MP+TM+SN+A	Channel 13		5		9			–	–	–	–		–	–	–	–
10 Aug 2026	Midgam R&C	HaHadashot 12		—N/a	5	5		(1.92)	–	–	–	–		–	–	–	–
10 Aug 2026	Midgam R&C	HaHadashot 12		6		6			–	–	–	–		–	–	–	–
9 August 2026	Kantar	Kan 11		—N/a	6	5		(2.52)	–	–	–	–		–	–	–	–
9 August 2026	Kantar	Kan 11		5		8			–	–	–	–		–	–	–	–
5 Aug 2026	MP+TM+SN+A	Channel 13		—N/a	5	6		(1.44)	–	–	–	–		–	–	–	–
5 Aug 2026	MP+TM+SN+A	Channel 13		7		8			–	–	–	–		–	–	–	–
3 Aug 2026	Midgam R&C	HaHadashot 12		—N/a	5	5		(1.2)	–	–	–	–		–	–	–	–
3 Aug 2026	Midgam R&C	HaHadashot 12		6		5			–	–	–	–		–	–	–	–
2 Aug 2026	Kantar	Kan 11		—N/a	5	6		(2.64)	–	–	–	–		–	–	–	–
2 Aug 2026	Kantar	Kan 11		5		6		–	–	–	–	–		–	–	–	–
27 Jul 2026	Midgam R&C	HaHadashot 12		—N/a	5	5		(1.44)	–	–	–	–		–	–	–	–
27 Jul 2026	Midgam R&C	HaHadashot 12		—N/a	4	6			–	–	–	–		–	–	–	–
1–2 Jul 2026	Yossi Tatika	Zman Yisrael		—N/a	4	5		–	–	–	–	–		–	–	–	–
1–2 Jul 2026	Yossi Tatika	Zman Yisrael		—N/a	5	7			–	–	–	–		–	–	–	–
1 Jul 2026	MP+TM+SN+A	Channel 13		—N/a	5	6		–	–	–	–	–		–	–	–	–
1 Jul 2026	MP+TM+SN+A	Channel 13		—N/a	4	10			–	–	–	–		–	–	–	–
24–25 Jun 2026	Yossi Tatika	Zman Yisrael		—N/a	4	4		–	–	–	–	–		–	–	–	–
24–25 Jun 2026	Yossi Tatika	Zman Yisrael		—N/a	4	6			–	–	–	–		–	–	–	–
4 Jun 2026	Yossi Tatika	Zman Yisrael		—N/a	4	4		–	–	–	–	–		–	–	–	–
4 Jun 2026	Yossi Tatika	Zman Yisrael		—N/a	13				–	–	–	–		–	–	–	–
28 May 2026	Yossi Tatika	Zman Yisrael		—N/a	5	5		–	–	–	–	–		–	–	–	–
28 May 2026	Yossi Tatika	Zman Yisrael		—N/a	13				–	–	–	–		–	–	–	–
25 May 2026	MM+SN	Channel 13		—N/a	4	6		–	–	–	–		–	–	–	–	–
25 May 2026	MM+SN	Channel 13		—N/a	16				–	–	–	–		–	–	–	–
20 May 2026	Kantar	Kan 11		—N/a	5	5		–	–	–	–		–	–	–	–	–
20 May 2026	Kantar	Kan 11		—N/a	13				–	–	–	–		–	–	–	–
26 Apr–3 May 2026	Stat-Net Research Institute	MDC/KAS	500	—N/a	4.6	5.3		(1.8)	–	1.1	0.3	0.4		–	0.1	0.4	0.1
26 Apr–3 May 2026	Stat-Net Research Institute	MDC/KAS	500	—N/a	16.3				–	0.7	0.2	0.4		–	0.1	0.3	0.1
25–26 Feb 2026	LRI+P4A	Maariv		—N/a	5	5		(1.8)	–	–	–	–	–	–	–	–	–
25–26 Feb 2026	LRI+P4A	Maariv		—N/a	14				–	–	–	–	–	–	–	–	–
12 Feb 2026	Midgam R&C	HaHadashot 12		—N/a	5	5		(2.4)	–	–	–	–	–	–	–	–	–
12 Feb 2026	Midgam R&C	HaHadashot 12		—N/a	13				–	–	–	–	–	–	–	–	–
11–12 Feb 2026	Yossi Tatika	Zman Yisrael		—N/a	5	6		–	–	–	–	–	–	–	–	–	–
11–12 Feb 2026	Yossi Tatika	Zman Yisrael		—N/a	15				–	–	–	–	–	–	–	–	–
11 Feb 2026	Kantar	Israel Hayom		—N/a	5	5		(2.76)	–	–	–	–	–	–	–	–	–
11 Feb 2026	Kantar	Israel Hayom		—N/a	13				–	–	–	–	–	–	–	–	–
4 Feb 2026	MM+SN	Channel 13		—N/a	4	5		–	–	–	–	–	–	–	–	–	–
4 Feb 2026	MM+SN	Channel 13		—N/a	15				–	–	–	–	–	–	–	–	–
28–29 Jan 2026	Yossi Tatika	Zman Yisrael		—N/a	6	5		–	–	–	–	–	–	–	–	–	–
28–29 Jan 2026	Yossi Tatika	Zman Yisrael		—N/a	16				–	–	–	–	–	–	–	–	–
4 Dec 25	MM+SN	Channel 13		—N/a	4	6		(2.52)	–	–	–	–	–	–	–	–	–
4 Dec 25	MM+SN	Channel 13		—N/a	16				–	–	–	–	–	–	–	–	–
13–18 Nov 2025	Stat-Net Research Institute	MDC/KAS	500	—N/a	3.9	5.3		(2.6)	–	0.7	0.5	0.3	0.2	–	–	0.4	–
13–18 Nov 2025	Stat-Net Research Institute	MDC/KAS	500	—N/a	15.5				–	0.3	–	0.3	0.1	–	–	0.2	–
November 2025	Stat-Net Research Institute	internal		—N/a	4	5		–	–	–	–	–	–	–	–	–	–
November 2025	Stat-Net Research Institute	internal		—N/a	4	10			–	–	–	–	–	–	–	–	–
November 2025	Stat-Net Research Institute	internal		—N/a	16				–	–	–	–	–	–	–	–	–
10–16 June 2025	Stat-Net Research Institute	MDC/KAS	500	—N/a	4.3	4.8		(3)	–	1	–	0.5	–	0.5	–	0.5	–
10–17 Feb 2025	Stat-Net Research Institute	The Abraham Initiatives	750	—N/a	4.4	5.5		(2.6)	–	–	–	–	–	–	–	–	–
10–17 Feb 2025	Stat-Net Research Institute	The Abraham Initiatives	750	—N/a	4.2	(3.3)	(2.4)	(2.5)	–	–	–	–	–	–	–	–	–
10–17 Feb 2025	Stat-Net Research Institute	The Abraham Initiatives	750	—N/a	7.1		5.5		–	–	–	–	–	–	–	–	–
10–17 Feb 2025	Stat-Net Research Institute	The Abraham Initiatives	750	—N/a	4.1	8.6			–	–	–	–	–	–	–	–	–
10–17 Feb 2025	Stat-Net Research Institute	The Abraham Initiatives	750	—N/a	13.1				–	–	–	–	–	–	–	–	–
1–8 Dec 2024	Stat-Net Research Institute	MDC/KAS	500	—N/a	5	4		–	–	–	–	–	–	–	–	–	–
5–11 June 2024	Stat-Net Research Institute	MDC/KAS	502	—N/a	4.7	5.2		(3.5)	–	–	–	–	–	–	–	–	–

=== Voting intention polls (reported as percentages) ===
Fieldwork date	Polling firm	Publisher	Ra'am	Hadash	Ta'al	Balad	A Place for Us All	Dems	Likud	Yisrael Beiteinu	Together	Beyachad Natzliach	Yashar	Other Jewish Parties	Absent	No answer	Don't know
27 Aug – 1 Sep 2026	Afkar	Nazareth-Mashur W. Publishing Ltd.	19%	38%			7%	5%	3%	1%	2%	—N/a	2%	—N/a	9%	2%	12%
27 Aug – 1 Sep 2026	Afkar	Nazareth-Mashur W. Publishing Ltd.	16%	43%				4%	2%	1%	2%	—N/a	2%	—N/a	8%	2%	10%
27 Aug – 1 Sep 2026	Afkar	Nazareth-Mashur W. Publishing Ltd.	26%	40%			—N/a	4%	2%	1%	2%	—N/a	2%	—N/a	11%	1%	11%
26–29 Jan 2026	Arpanel	–	68%				—N/a	4%	3%	1%	—N/a	—N/a	—N/a	—N/a	11%	9%	—N/a
26–29 Jan 2026	Arpanel	–	20%	47%			—N/a	5%	—N/a	4%	—N/a	—N/a	1%	1%	13%	9%	—N/a
26–29 Jan 2026	Arpanel	–	21%	17%	8%	10%	—N/a	5%	3%	—N/a	1%	—N/a	—N/a	1%	21%	13%	—N/a
2022 election result (estimation)			35.2%	28.8%		21.8%	–	3.5% (Note: combined 2022 popular vote of Labor and Meretz, the precursor parties of The Democrats)	2.2%	2.0%	1.7%	–	–	4.8%	46.8%	–	–

== Preferred prime minister ==
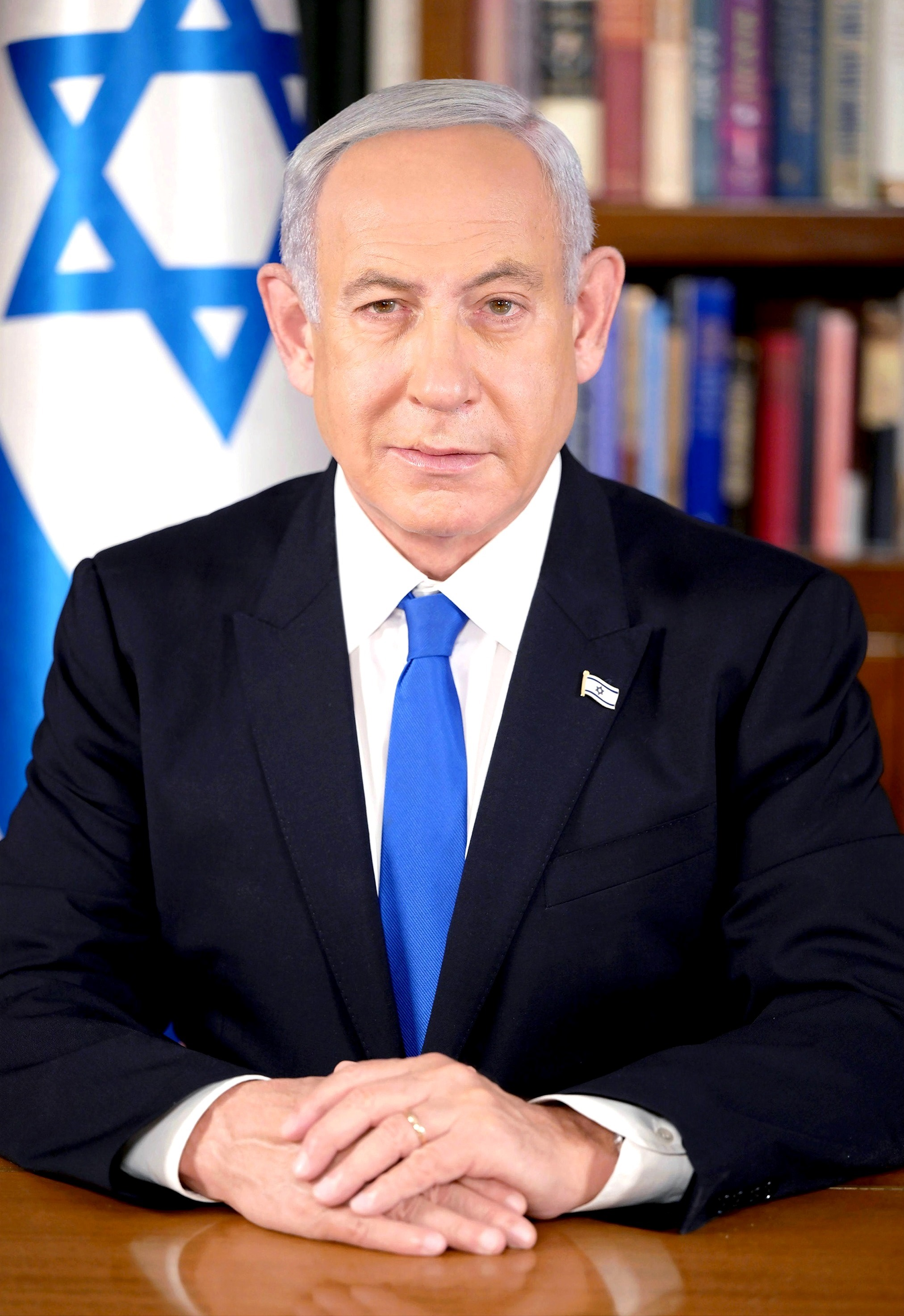
Benjamin Netanyahu
· Prime Minister
· Leader of the Likud party

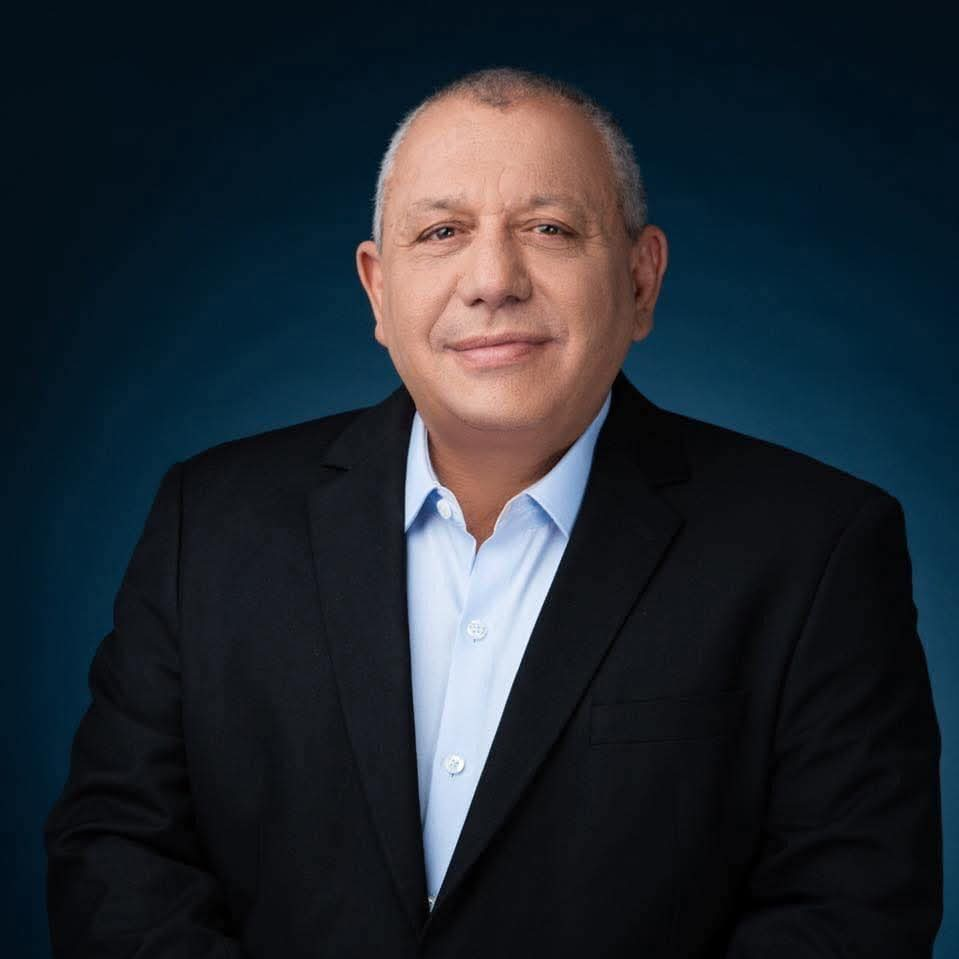
Gadi Eisenkot
· Leader of Yashar
· Former Chief of General Staff

Date	Polling firm	Publisher	Netanyahu	Eisenkot	Neither	Undecided
7 Oct	SF+ND	Channel 14	52	48	–	
5 Oct	Midgam R&C	HaHadashot 12	38	41	13	8
4 Oct	Kantar	Kan 11	41	38	21	
1 Oct	SF+ND	Channel 14	54	46	–	
30 Sep – 1 Oct	LRI+P4A	Maariv	41	47	12	
29 Sep	Maagar Mochot	Channel 16	41	46	13	
28 Sep 26	SF+ND	Channel 14	54	46	–	
27 Sep 26	Kantar	Kan 11	39	38	26	
23 Sep 26	SF+ND	Channel 14	53	47	–	
17 Sep 26	SF+ND	Channel 14	57	43	–	
14 Sep 26	Kantar	Kan 11	36	39	25	
9–10 Sep 26	LRI+P4A	Maariv	38	50	–	12
9 Sep 26	SF+ND	Channel 14	53	47	–	
9 Sep	Maagar Mochot	Channel 16	42	43	15	–
9 Sep 26	Midgam R&C	HaHadashot 12	38	42	13	7
9 Sep 26	MP+TM+SN+A	Channel 13	35	46	–	19
7 Sep 26	SF+ND	Channel 14	56	44	–	
7 Sep 26	Midgam R&C	HaHadashot 12	35	42	17	6
6 Sep 26	Kantar	Kan 11	35	38	29	
3–4 Sep 26	LRI+P4A	Maariv	39	48	–	13
3 Sep 26	SF+ND	Channel 14	54	46	–	
2 Sep 26	MP+TM+SN+A	Channel 13	37	47	–	16
2 Sep 26	Maagar Mochot	Channel 16	40	45	15	–
31 Aug 26	Midgam R&C	HaHadashot 12	34	43	17	6
30 Aug 26	SF+ND	Channel 14	54	46	–	
30 Aug 26	Kantar	Kan 11	37	40	23	
27 Aug 26	SF+ND	Channel 14	56	44	–	
26–27 Aug 26	LRI+P4A	Maariv	37	48	–	15
26 Aug 26	Maagar Mochot	Channel 16	41	44	15	–
24 Aug 26	SF+ND	Channel 14	56	44	–	
24 Aug 26	Midgam R&C	HaHadashot 12	34	44	16	6
23 Aug 26	Kantar	Kan 11	35	41	24	
19–20 Aug 26	LRI+P4A	Maariv	38	52	–	10
19 Aug 26	MP+TM+SN+A	Channel 13	38	47	–	15
19 Aug 26	Maagar Mochot	Channel 16	40	44	16	–
18 Aug 26	SF+ND	Channel 14	55	45	–	
17 Aug 26	Midgam R&C	HaHadashot 12	34	38	22	6
16 Aug 26	Kantar	Kan 11	36	41	23	
12–13 Aug 26	LRI+P4A	Maariv	38	49	–	13
12 Aug 26	MP+TM+SN+A	Channel 13	34	47	–	19
10 Aug 26	Maagar Mochot	Channel 16	40	43	17	–
10 Aug 26	Midgam R&C	HaHadashot 12	35	40	19	7
9 Aug 26	Kantar	Kan 11	41	34	25	
9 Aug 26	SF+ND	Channel 14	55	45	–	
5–6 Aug 26	LRI+P4A	Maariv	38	47	–	15
5 Aug 26	MP+TM+SN+A	Channel 13	36	46	18	
4 Aug 26	SF+ND	Channel 14	56	44	–	
3 Aug 26	Midgam R&C	HaHadashot 12	37	37	21	5
2 Aug 26	Kantar	Kan 11	40	36	24	
29–30 Jul 26	LRI+P4A	Maariv	38	48	–	13
29 Jul 26	MP+TM+SN+A	Channel 13	36	47	17	
27 Jul 26	Midgam R&C	HaHadashot 12	38	38	24	
27 Jul 26	Direct Polls	i24 News	45	44	11	
26 Jul 26	Kantar	Kan 11	39	38	23	
22–23 Jul 26	LRI+P4A	Maariv	40	46	–	14
19 Jul 26	Kantar	Kan 11	36	35	29	
16 Jul 26	Direct Polls	i24 News	44	47	–	9
13 Jul 26	Midgam R&C	HaHadashot 12	34	43	27	
5 Jul 26	Kantar	Kan 11	40	41	19	
11 Jun 26	Midgam R&C	HaHadashot 12	36	36	28	
4 Jun 26	Midgam R&C	HaHadashot 12	35	38	27	
14 May 26	Midgam R&C	HaHadashot 12	39	35	26	
2 May 26	LRI+P4A	Maariv	42	44	–	14
17 Apr 26	LRI+P4A	Maariv	45	38	–	17
19 Mar 26	Midgam R&C	HaHadashot 12	43	31	–	–
17 Feb 25	Midgam R&C	HaHadashot 12	36	31	–	–
30 Jan 24	Midgam R&C	HaHadashot 12	24	36	31	9
21 Jan 24	CF+MP+SN	Channel 13	32	45	–	23

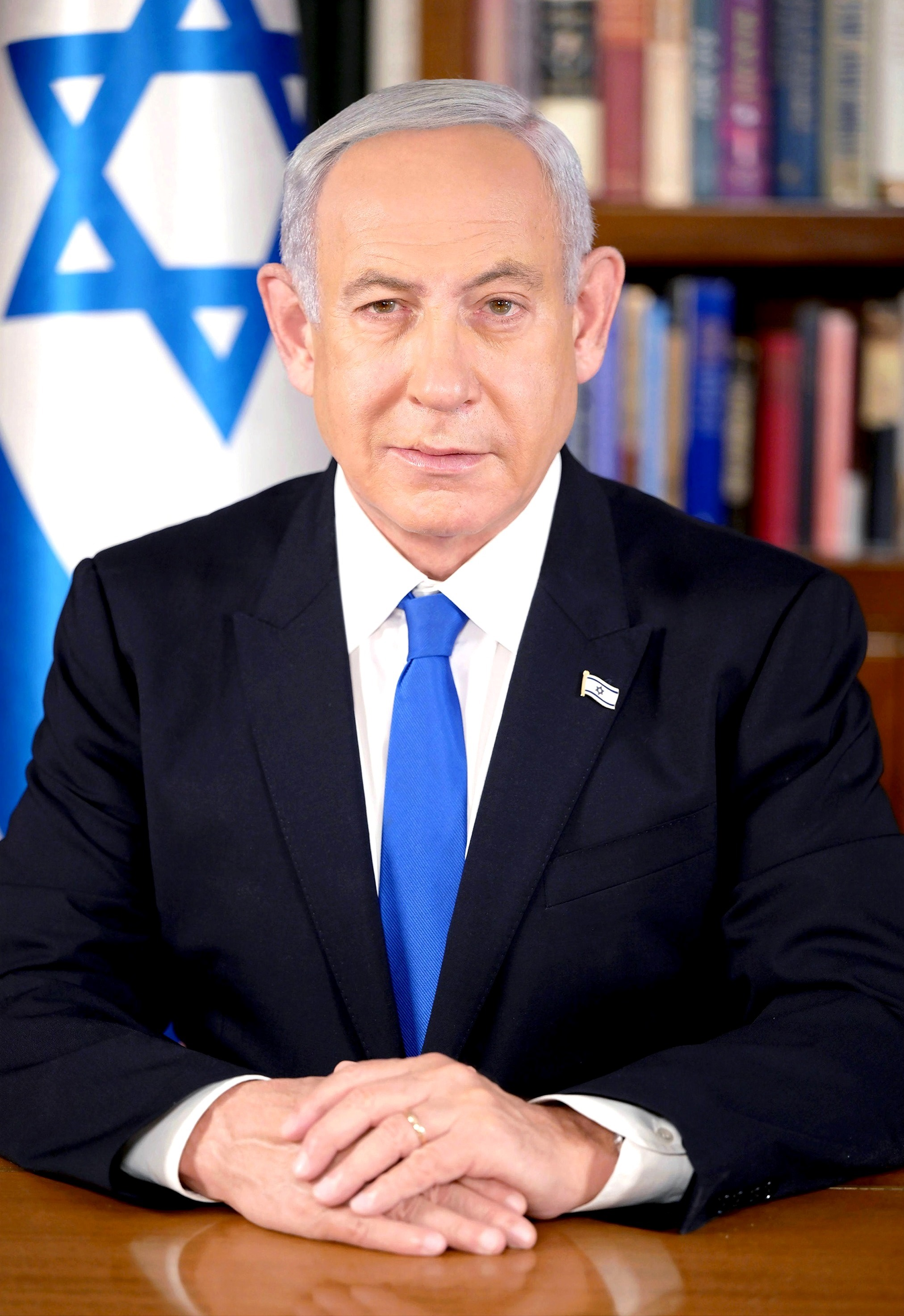
Benjamin Netanyahu
· Prime Minister
· Leader of the Likud party

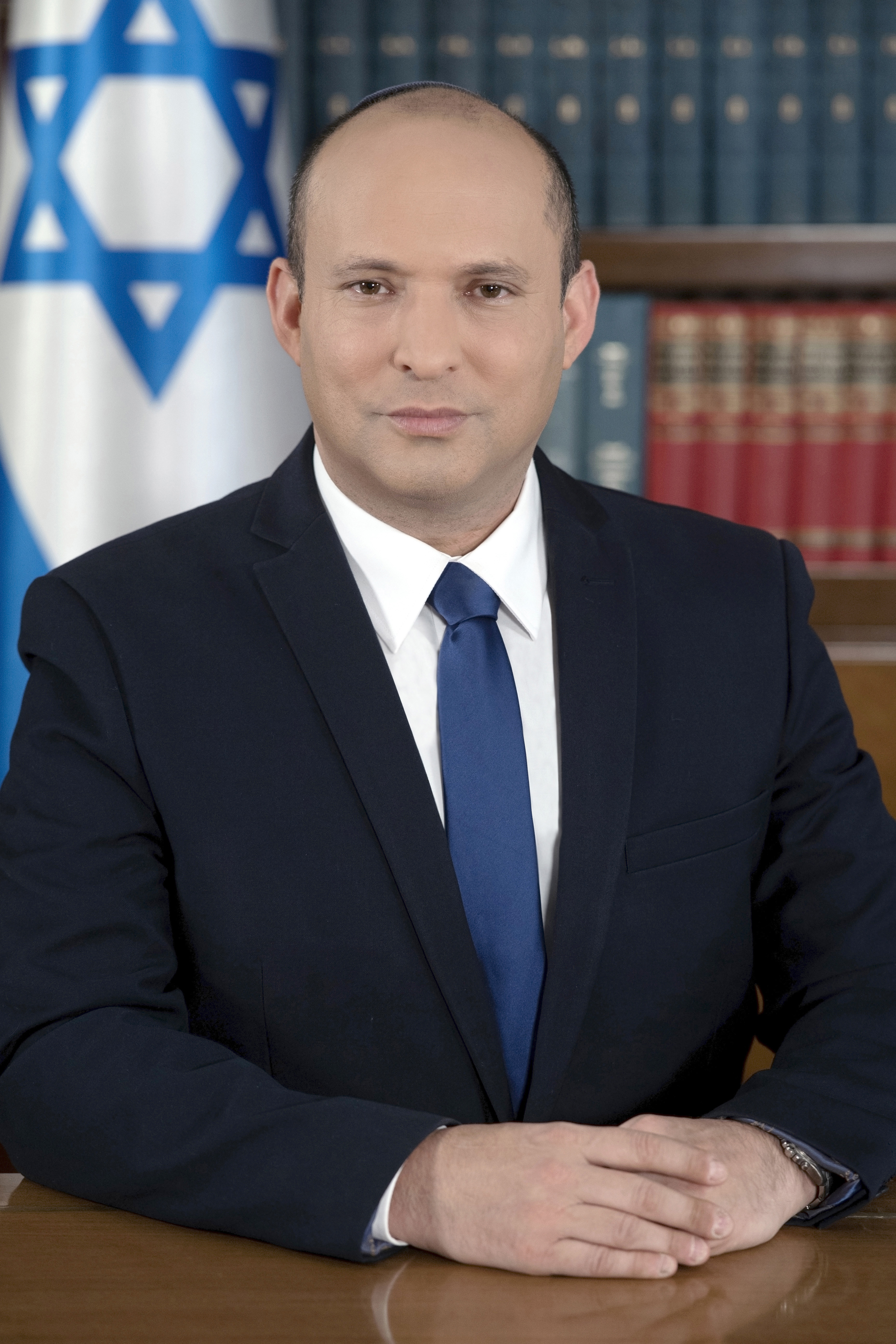
Naftali Bennett
· Former Prime minister
. Leader of the Bennett 2026 party

Date	Polling firm	Publisher	Netanyahu	Bennett	Neither	Undecided
5 Oct	Midgam R&C	HaHadashot 12	41	37	16	6
4 Oct	Kantar	Kan 11	40	35	25	
27 Sep 26	Kantar	Kan 11	42	33	25	
14 Sep 26	Kantar	Kan 11	37	32	31	
9–10 Sep 26	LRI+P4A	Maariv	40	45	–	15
9 Sep 26	Midgam R&C	HaHadashot 12	40	37	19	4
7 Sep 26	Midgam R&C	HaHadashot 12	38	35	23	6
6 Sep 26	Kantar	Kan 11	37	32	31	
3–4 Sep 26	LRI+P4A	Maariv	39	43	–	15
31 Aug 26	Midgam R&C	HaHadashot 12	36	35	23	6
30 Aug 26	Kantar	Kan 11	37	36	27	
26–27 Aug 26	LRI+P4A	Maariv	40	45	–	15
24 Aug 26	Midgam R&C	HaHadashot 12	37	39	19	5
23 Aug 26	Kantar	Kan 11	36	37	27	
19–20 Aug 26	LRI+P4A	Maariv	41	45	–	14
19 Aug 26	MP+TM+SN+A	Channel 13	42	43	–	15
17 Aug 26	Midgam R&C	HaHadashot 12	35	34	27	4
16 Aug 26	Kantar	Kan 11	37	35	28	
10 Aug 26	Midgam R&C	HaHadashot 12	35	37	22	5
9 Aug 26	Kantar	Kan 11	41	31	28	
5–6 Aug 26	LRI+P4A	Maariv	40	43	–	17
3 Aug 26	Midgam R&C	HaHadashot 12	38	37	21	4
2 Aug 26	Kantar	Kan 11	40	31	29	
29–30 Jul 26	LRI+P4A	Maariv	39	44	–	17
29 Jul 26	MP+TM+SN+A	Channel 13	40	45	15	
27 Jul 26	Midgam R&C	HaHadashot 12	40	34	26	
27 Jul 26	Direct Polls	i24 News	47	37	16	
26 Jul 26	Kantar	Kan 11	39	31	30	
22–23 Jul26	LRI+P4A	Maariv	42	45	–	13
19 Jul 26	Kantar	Kan 11	36	32	35	
13 Jul 26	Midgam R&C	HaHadashot 12	37	35	28	
5 Jul 26	Kantar	Kan 11	41	33	26	
11 Jun 26	Midgam R&C	HaHadashot 12	37	33	29	
4 Jun 26	Midgam R&C	HaHadashot 12	38	31	31	
14 May 26	Midgam R&C	HaHadashot 12	40	33	27	
2 May 26	LRI+P4A	Maariv	41	46	–	13
17 Apr 26	LRI+P4A	Maariv	43	41	–	16
19 Mar 26	Midgam R&C	HaHadashot 12	44	28	24	4
4 Jun 25	Midgam R&C	HaHadashot 12	34	39	20	–
17 Feb 25	Midgam R&C	HaHadashot 12	37	37	–	–
28 Oct 24	Midgam R&C	HaHadashot 12	38	35	23	4
29 Sep 24	Midgam R&C	HaHadashot 12	35	38	20	7
9 Sep 24	Midgam R&C	HaHadashot 12	32	39	22	7
22 Aug 24	Midgam R&C	HaHadashot 12	31	39	25	5
10–11 Jul 24	LRI+P4A	Maariv	35	48	17	–
9 Jul 24	Timor Group	i24 News	28	41	31	–
28 Jun 24	LRI+P4A	Maariv	36	48	–	–
24 Jun 24	Midgam R&C	HaHadashot 12	29	39	27	5
21 Jun 24	Midgam R&C	HaHadashot 12	28	36	31	5
29 May 24	Midgam R&C	HaHadashot 12	34	32	29	5
11 Jan 24	Midgam R&C	HaHadashot 12	30	31	–	–
18 Dec 23	Midgam R&C	HaHadashot 12	29	33	32	6
7 Jul 23	Midgam R&C	HaHadashot 12	39	25	36	
30 Apr 23	CF+MP+SN	Channel 13	43	40	–	17

== Coalition polls ==
=== Preferred coalition ===
Date	Polling firm	Publisher	Distinct bloc	Right-wing bloc	Right-wing w. Opposition party	Cross-bloc w. Haredi	Cross-bloc	Cross-bloc w/o extremists	Cross-bloc w. Arabs	Other Cross-bloc	Opposition w. Coalition party	Opposition	Opposition w. Arabs	Undecided
23 Jul	Kantar	Israel Hayom	33	—N/a	—N/a	—N/a	41	—N/a	—N/a	—N/a	—N/a	—N/a	—N/a	26
1–7 Jul	theMadad.com; Afkar Research	JPPI	—N/a	28	14	5	16	—N/a	8	—N/a	—N/a	8	27	7
1 Jul	Midgam R&C	Channel 13	—N/a	18	—N/a	—N/a	20	—N/a	—N/a	13 (Note: "Cross-bloc" but does not exclude Arab and Ultra-orthodox parties)	—N/a	—N/a	32 (Note: "Change government (similar to the Bennett–Lapid government))	17
30 Jun	Direct Polls	i24 News	—N/a	23	—N/a	—N/a	50	—N/a	—N/a	—N/a	—N/a	—N/a	27	—N/a
25 May	MM+SN	Channel 13	—N/a	27	—N/a	—N/a	20	—N/a	—N/a	—N/a	—N/a	24	23	6
2–5 Mar	theMadad.com; Afkar Research	JPPI	—N/a	15	19	—N/a	13	7	8	4 (Note: Roughly equal mix of coalition and opposition parties)	10	—N/a	22	11

=== Inclusion of ultra-Orthodox parties in the next government ===
Date	Polling firm	Publisher	Would like	Would dislike	Undecided
21 June 2024	Midgam R&C	HaHadashot 12	30	56	14

Coalition voters

Date	Polling firm	Publisher	Would like	Would dislike	Undecided
20 Jul	Midgam R&C	HaHadashot 12	70	19	11
17 Jul	LRI+P4A	Maariv	59	19	22

Opposition voters

Date	Polling firm	Publisher	Would like	Would dislike	Undecided
17 Jul	LRI+P4A	Maariv	8	83	8

=== Inclusion of Arab parties in the next government ===
These questions were posed to the Arab population of Israel.

Date	Polling firm	Publisher	Yes, in any coalition	Only in center-left coalition	Oppose, but support govt from outside	Oppose any government	Combined Yes	Combined No
5 Aug 26	MP+TM+SN+A	Channel 13	—N/a	—N/a	—N/a	—N/a	65% (Note: Inclusion of Ra'am if Yoav Segalovitz joins the party)	23%
17 Jul 26	LRI+P4A	Maariv	—N/a	—N/a	—N/a	—N/a	70%	10%
14 May 2026	Stat-Net Research Institute	KAP, Tel Aviv University	43.3%	33.9%	11.6%	6.7%	77.2%	18.3%
25 November 2025	Stat-Net Research Institute	KAP, Tel Aviv University	45.6%	31.8%	10.5%	8.4%	77.4%	18.9%
25 June 2025	Stat-Net Research Institute	KAP, Tel Aviv University	41.8%	31.4%	11.7%	11.3%	73.2%	23%
10–17 Feb 2025	Stat-Net Research Institute	The Abraham Initiatives	44%	33%	12%	9%	77%	21%
12 December 2024	Stat-Net Research Institute	KAP, Tel Aviv University	47.8%	24.0%	12.9%	12.5%	71.8%	25.4%
20 June 2024	Stat-Net Research Institute	KAP, Tel Aviv University	40.2%	28.5%	16.3%	14.2%	68.7%	30.5%
3 December 2023	Stat-Net Research Institute	KAP, Tel Aviv University	46.9%	18.9%	7.2%	20.2%	65.8%	27.4%
26 June 2023	Stat-Net Research Institute	KAP, Tel Aviv University	46.6%	16.7%	13.8%	13.5%	63.3%	27.3%

==== Inclusion of Ra'am with Yoav Segalovitz ====
Date	Polling firm	Publisher	Would like	Would dislike	Undecided
10 Aug	Maagar Mochot	Channel 16	29	45	26
5–6 Aug	LRI+P4A	Maariv	20	55	25
5–6 Aug	Yossi Tatika	Zman Yisrael	38	40	22
5 Aug	MP+TM+SN+A	Channel 13	29	45	26

Coalition voters

Date	Polling firm	Publisher	Would like	Would dislike	Undecided
5–6 Aug	Yossi Tatika	Zman Yisrael	11	55	34
5 Aug	MP+TM+SN+A	Channel 13	6	79	14

Opposition voters

Date	Polling firm	Publisher	Would like	Would dislike	Undecided
5–6 Aug	Yossi Tatika	Zman Yisrael	56	30	14
5 Aug	MP+TM+SN+A	Channel 13	37	32	31

== Other questions ==
=== Whether voters intend to vote for the same party that they did in 2022 ===
The Israel Democracy Institute commissioned the Viterbi Center to gauge voting intentions of Israeli voters based on their voting history. In January 2023, they asked if voters would vote for the same party as they did in 2022. In that poll, 50% were certain they would, 22% think yes, 7% think no, and 4% were certain that they would not. An additional 3% of those polled did not vote in 2022 but planned to in the next election, 6% did not and do not plan to vote, and 10% were undecided.

In October 2023, the question was asked again but centered around voting block. In that poll, 39.7% would vote for the same party as was voted for in 2022, 14.8% would vote for the same political bloc, 6.3% would vote for a party in a different bloc, and a combined 39.2% of those surveyed either wouldn't vote or were undecided. The Israel Democracy Institute also ran a series of surveys in 2024 asking people their re-voting intention, based on which party they voted for.

Date	Balad	Hadash-Ta'al	Shas	Labor	Likud	Meretz	National Unity	OY/RZ	Ra'am	UTJ	Yesh Atid	Yisrael Beiteinu
December 2024	61%	51%	57%	46%	54%	62%	34%	63%	65%	84%	28%	52%
October 2024	49%	54%	54%	48%	50%	67%	43%	60%	55%	82%	29%	59%
September 2024	40%	53%	50%	47%	46%	71%	45%	55%	62%	79%	29%	53%
August 2024	29%	44.5%	68%	51%	39%	74%	48%	51%	55%	71%	31%	66.5%
July 2024	28%	39%	74%	45%	39%	66%	48%	52%	58%	69.5%	31%	72%
June 2024	36%	44%	76%	37%	36%	60%	58%	59%	56%	72%	35.5%	78%
May 2024	40%	54%	77%	24%	37%	48%	63%	56%	55%	80%	32%	70%
April 2024	49%	59%	74%	20%	38%	55%	70%	63%	63%	89%	32%	65%

=== Timing of the next election ===
Date	Polling firm	Publisher	November 2026, as scheduled	Now	At the end of the war	Other
22–23 Oct 2025	Yossi Tatika	Zman Yisrael	39.11%	45.05%	—N/a	15.85%
4 June 2025	Midgam R&C	HaHadashot 12	31%	57%	—N/a	12%
23 May 2024	Kantar	Kan 11	22%	38%	32%	8%
30 January 2024	Viterbi Center	IDI	21.5%	33%	38%	7.5%

=== Joint List reunification ===
These questions were posed to the Arab population of Israel.

Date	Polling firm	Publisher	Would like	Would dislike	Undecided	Two Lists	Three Lists
26–29 Jan 2026	Arpanel	–	82	9	9	–	–
Nov 2026	Stat-Net Research Institute	–	82	–	7	9	2
10–17 Feb 2025	Stat-Net Research Institute	The Abraham Initiatives	89	11		–	–
