= Post-war plans for the Gaza Strip =

As the Gaza war continued throughout 2024 and 2025, various leaders of different regional and international powers put forth distinct plans for the post-war organization of the Gaza Strip. In November 2025, the United Nations Security Council voted to support the US-backed Gaza peace plan in November 2025.

== Plans ==
=== Israeli leaders' plans ===
On 16 October 2023, the Israeli war cabinet stated that it had four central goals for the war: the end of the Hamas government and dismantlement of its capabilities, the removal of the terrorist threat from Gaza, the return of Israeli hostages held by Hamas, and the security of Israel's borders and its residents.

About a month after the war began, Israeli Prime Minister Benjamin Netanyahu said that overall security responsibility for the Gaza Strip would rest with Israel after the war, for an indefinite period. He said that the Strip would be "demilitarized and under a civilian government, but a reliable force would be required to enter and kill the murderers so that an entity like Hamas would not emerge", and that after the elimination of Hamas there would be overall Israeli security control over the Gaza Strip, including full demilitarization. On 11 November, Netanyahu expressed opposition to the possibility of the Palestinian Authority assuming civilian control over the Strip. In response to a question about the possibility of returning Jewish settlement to the Strip, he said that he did not see this as a realistic goal.

In February 2024, Netanyahu presented his proposal for the "Day After Hamas" to the Security Cabinet of Israel. It included management by local people and was not rejected or approved by a vote at the cabinet. About six months after the start of the war, it was reported that Netanyahu was preventing a strategic discussion on the goals of the war in light of its progress, contrary to the agreement reached in the war cabinet. In May 2024, it was reported that the IDF leadership was demanding that the prime minister make a decision on post-war issues. On 15 May, Israeli Defense Minister Yoav Gallant convened a press conference in which he called on Netanyahu to announce that Israel would not control Gaza, and expressed his opposition to an Israeli civilian and military government in Gaza. His remarks drew criticism from coalition and opposition figures, and were supported by the leader of the National Unity party, Benny Gantz.

On 24 July, Netanyahu outlined his vision for the post-war Gaza Strip before the US Congress:

A demilitarized Gaza free of weapons and extremism. We do not want to settle in Gaza, but we will have to maintain security responsibility there. It should be run by Palestinians who do not want to destroy Israel. A new generation of Palestinians should learn no more to hate Jews but to live in peace with us. After our victory, with the help of partners in the region, the demilitarization of Gaza and the end of extremism in Gaza, we can bring about a future of peace and prosperity.

On 2 April, Israel Katz announced the Israeli government's intention to "seize large areas" of Gaza as Israel launched a large surprise attack which ended the January 2025 ceasefire. On 17 April, Katz said that Israeli forces would remain in areas of Gaza, Lebanon and Syria indefinitely. On 5 May, the Israeli cabinet approved plans to capture the entire Gaza Strip and occupy it for an unspecified period. Far-right Minister of Finance Bezalel Smotrich said that Gaza would be "entirely destroyed" in Israel's new offensive and that the population would be expelled.

On 8 August 2025, the Security Cabinet approved five principles for ending the war, including disarming Hamas, returning all hostages, demilitarizing the Gaza Strip, maintaining Israeli security control over it, and establishing an alternative civilian government not affiliated with Hamas or the Palestinian Authority. Smotrich then withdrew confidence in Netanyahu's war leadership, criticizing his Gaza strategy as weak and calling for a decisive military victory over Hamas.

=== Donald Trump's proposals ===
In February 2025, Donald Trump announced his intention to displace the Palestinian population of Gaza, reiterating his position that they should be resettled in neighboring Arab countries. Ahead of a meeting with Netanyahu, Trump specified his intention to permanently displace Gaza's Palestinian inhabitants, which would be in violation of international law. He proposed a US takeover of Gaza during a press conference with Netanyahu.

Trump insisted that neighboring countries would pay for Gaza's reconstruction and that "world people" would live there. He did not rule out deploying US troops if necessary. On 5 and 6 February, Trump aides and Trump himself walked back some of his comments, including his willingness to deploy US soldiers. On 10 February, Trump said that Palestinians who leave Gaza would have no right of return. In a meeting with King Abdullah II of Jordan, Trump said that the US would take rather than buy Gaza because "It's a war torn area. It's Gaza. There is nothing to buy." Trump had proposed Jordan take in the displaced Palestinians from Gaza, which Jordanian foreign minister Ayman Safadi rejected, stating "They don't want to come to Jordan and we don't want them to come to Jordan."

Trump's statements were met with condemnation from world leaders; however, in Israel, far-right national security minister Itamar Ben-Gvir praised Trump, saying that Palestinian "migration" was the only solution. Netanyahu and Ben-Gvir characterized the planned displacement of Gazans as a "voluntary migration", but communications minister Shlomo Karhi said the transfer will be forced.

Trump has rejected the Arab League plan, and stated that, "The current proposal does not address the reality that Gaza is currently uninhabitable and residents cannot humanely live in a territory covered in debris and unexploded ordnance," and that the Trump administration will go ahead with seizing the territory "to bring peace and prosperity to the region".

In May 2025, US special envoy Steve Witkoff proposed a ceasefire in Gaza. This proposal reportedly included a 60-day truce, freeing of 28 hostages, release of over 1000 Palestinian prisoners and supply of humanitarian aid. Israel accepted the proposal. Hamas requested amendments to the plan and reiterated calls for the complete withdrawal of the IDF from Gaza.

In September 2025, Israeli and British media reported a proposal by former British prime minister Tony Blair for a Gaza International Transitional Authority to administer the Gaza Strip for a transitional period, before turning over administration to the Palestinian Authority.

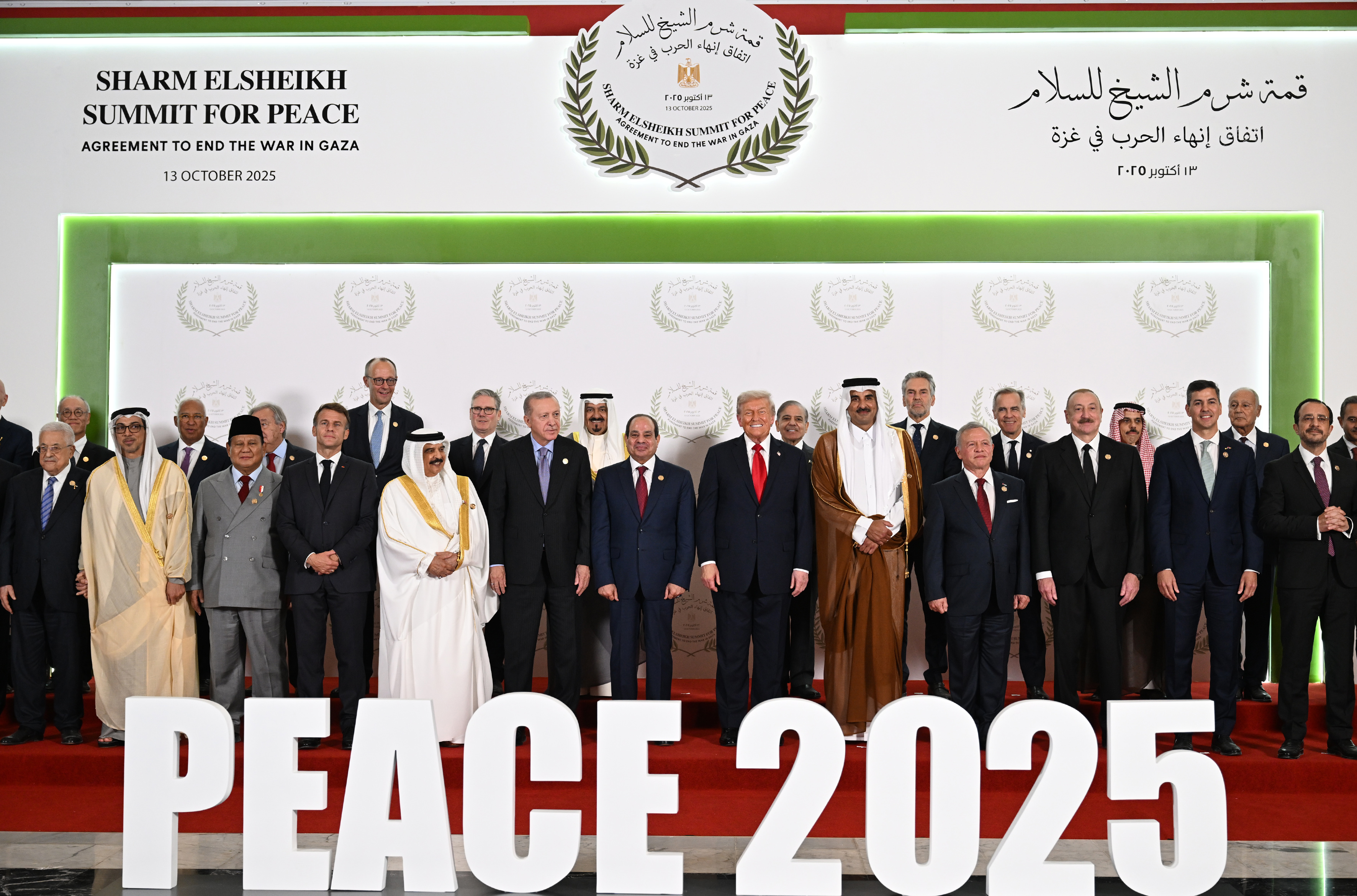
Gaza Peace Summit in Sharm El Sheikh, Egypt, 13 October 2025

On 29 September 2025, Trump and Netanyahu announced in a press conference that they had agreed on a peace plan. It includes the cessation of hostilities, the release of Israeli hostages, and the establishment of a governance alternative to Hamas. Trump stated that the implementation of the plan was contingent upon Hamas's approval. Multiple Arab countries announced their support for the plan. On 3 October, Hamas agreed to releasing hostages and handing over Gaza's administration to an technocratic government supported by Arab countries, also pledging to continue to negotiate on other parts of the plan. Hamas did not comment on the stipulation that it must disarm.

On 8 October 2025, Trump announced that Israel and Hamas had agreed to the "first phase" of the plan, which included a pause in fighting, the release of "at least" some hostages and prisoners, and an Israeli troop withdrawal from parts of Gaza. The agreement, reached after negotiations in Egypt involving U.S., Qatari, Turkish, Egyptian, Israeli and Hamas officials, was described as the most significant breakthrough in months toward ending the two-year war. An international Gaza peace summit on the next phase of the peace plan took place on 13 October 2025 in Sharm el Shaikh, Egypt.

Building upon the initial phase, the transition toward the second stage of the peace plan materialized in early January 2026. On 8 January 2026, Prime Minister Benjamin Netanyahu announced the designation of Bulgarian diplomat Nickolay Mladenov as the director-general of the U.S.-backed Board of Peace. Mladenov, a former UN Middle East envoy, is slated to serve as the day-to-day administrator for the board, nominally chaired by U.S. President Donald Trump, which is expected to be formally unveiled in mid-January.

The body is tasked with supervising a transitional administration of apolitical professionals and managing a phased disarmament program for Hamas and other factions. This disarmament framework, which includes the decommissioning of heavy weaponry and an internationally funded "buy-back" program for light arms, is designed to be verified by independent monitors. The plan also envisions the deployment of an International Stabilization Force (ISF) to assume security duties and oversee the destruction of military infrastructure as the IDF conducts further territorial withdrawals. Despite these advancements, the transition remains fragile, contingent on the finalization of the ISF's multinational composition and the return of the final Israeli hostage's remains.

=== Arab League proposal ===
Arab governments rejected Trump's transfer plan, instead backing an Egyptian proposal. The Arab League in March devised a $53-billion plan detailing the reconstruction of Gaza while keeping its population in place. The proposal also included the requirement that Hamas disarm and fresh elections to a reformed Palestinian Authority be held. Algerian President Abdelmadjid Tebboune boycotted the league meeting saying that it was "monopolized by a limited and narrow group of Arab countries". Hamas reiterated that the group's arms were non-negotiable and rejected the plan.

=== Russian proposal ===
On 13 November 2025, a counter-proposal made by Russia to the one drafted by the US was announced to the Security Council. The proposal supported the Palestinian statehood and the annexation of Gaza by the Palestinian Authority as soon as possible. The Russian plan also opposed a stabilization force in Gaza. Russia also insists that the American plan is in contradiction with previous Council resolutions. The Russian plan was supported by China.

=== Others ===
In March 2025, the United States and Israel said they have contacted officials from Egypt, Jordan, Sudan, Syria, Morocco, Puntland, and Somaliland to discuss the resettlement of Gaza residents in their territories. Egypt, Jordan, and Sudan, rejected the proposal while Somalia and Somaliland denied that they had been contacted. In May 2025, reports emerged that the Trump administration was working on a plan to permanently relocate 1 million Gazans to Libya, in exchange offering the release of around $30 billion in funds frozen by the US since the toppling of the regime of Muammar Gaddafi. In August 2025, reports suggested that Netanyahu was in talks with South Sudan to discuss the resettlement of Gaza residents. Reports stated that the South Sudanese cabinet actually agreed to the deal, but it fell short in parliament and other parts of the South Sudanese government. South Sudan rejected the reports and its ministry of foreign affairs released a statement denying holding talks with Israel about the relocation of Palestinians, calling the reports "baseless".
