= Bacheha, Salamat Bashid =

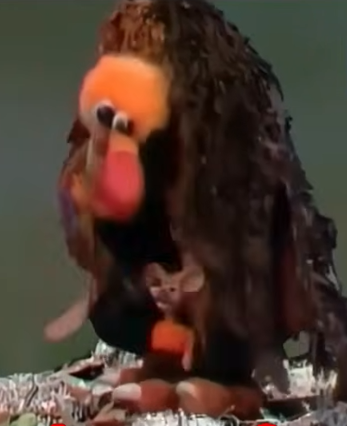
- Country of origin: Iran
- Original language: Persian

Production
- Running time: 1-2 minutes

Original release
- Release: 1980s

Bacheha, Salamat Bashid was a puppet TV series that aired in the 1980s during the Iran-Iraq war teaching kids to be healthy.

The show was often used to teach kids to be careful by using things such as scare tactics to force kids into compliance such as giving the mouse what many considered to be a frightening voice.

The show's longevity was a causation of negativity as it did end up showing several traumatizing scenes to children with many arguing that it could have been a more effective show but did not consider the age gap when creating the show.

The show was re aired in the 2010s.

There is no information on who was running the show or who was managing the puppetry of the show.

== Characters ==
There was a total of two characters in the show, a vulture and a mouse, one was to represent bad hygiene while the main character was a mouse who was telling kids to be healthy using a coarse sounding voice.
