= Arab voters are streaming in quantity to the polling stations =

2015 statement by Benjamin Netanyahu

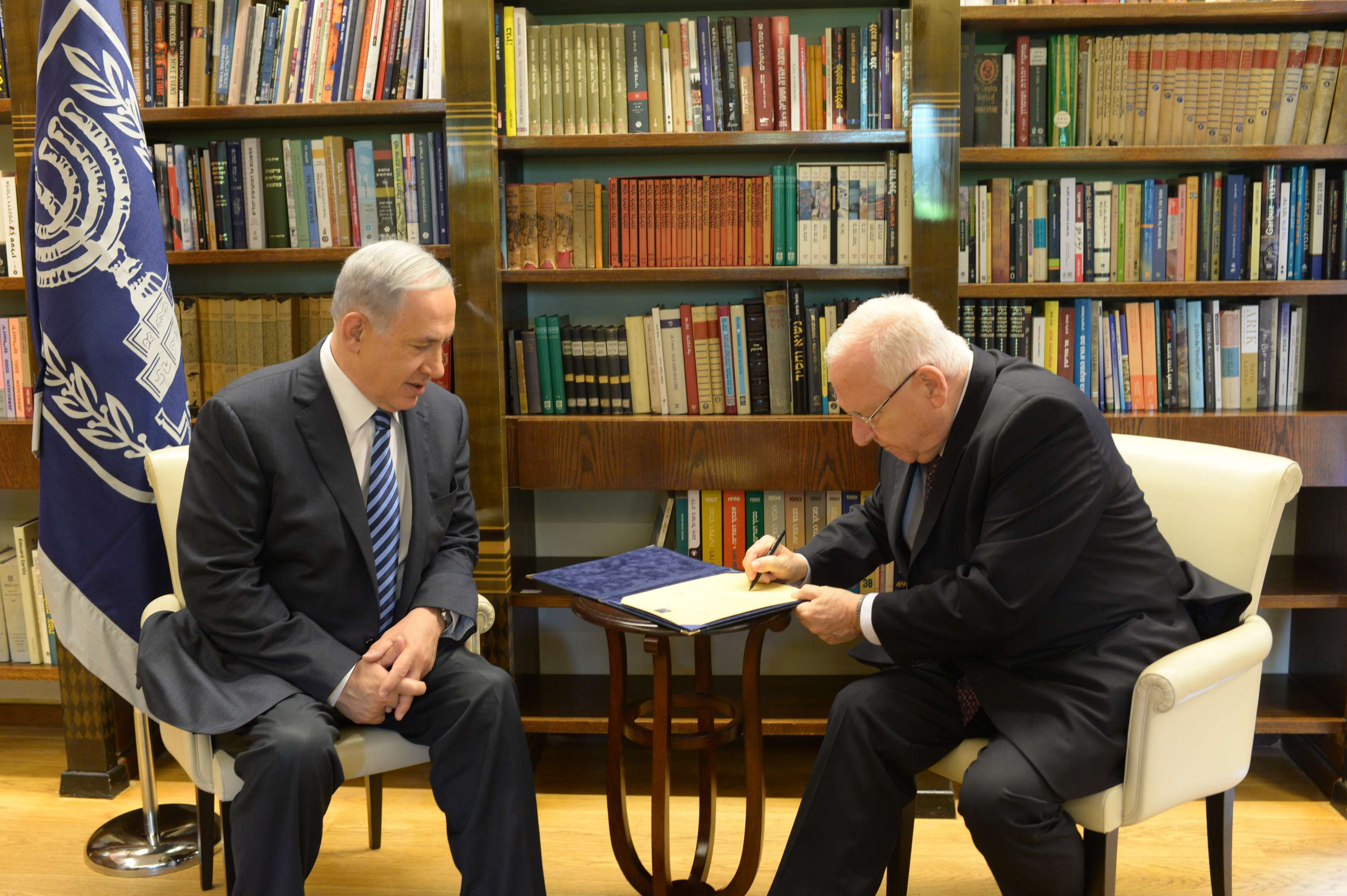
- Reuven Rivlin approves an extension for Benjamin Netanyahu to form the 34th Israel government, 2015
- Origin: Flooding
- Original form: המצביעים הערבים נעים בכמויות אדירות לקלפי
- Context: 2015 Israeli legislative election
- Coined by: Benjamin Netanyahu
- Meaning: Decreasing the seats of the right wing in the Knesset

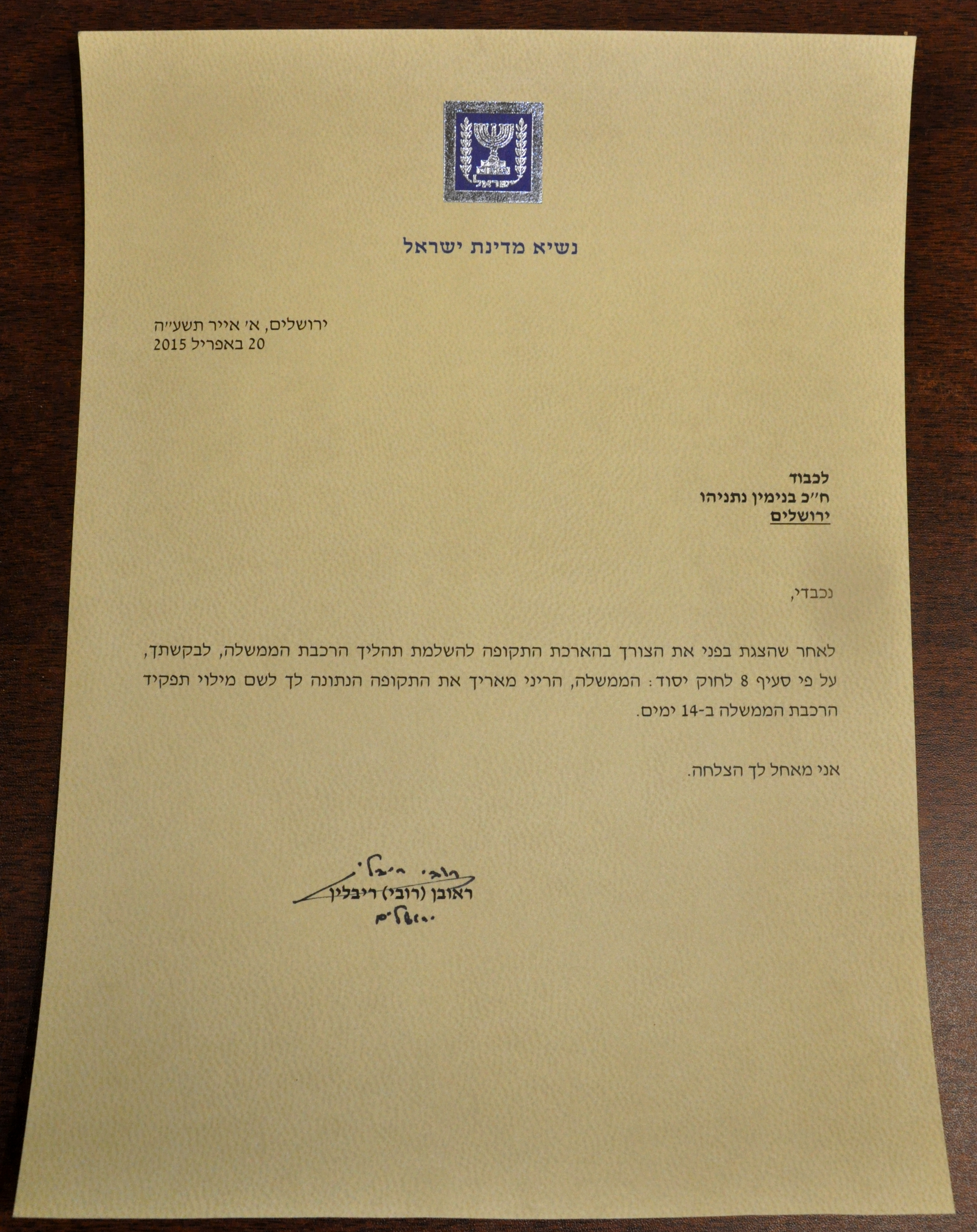
The extension letter of Rivlin: "After you presented to me the need to extend the period to complete the process of forming the government, at your request, according to Section 8 of the Basic Law: The Government, I am extending the period given to you to fulfill the role of forming the government by 14 days", 2015

"Arab voters are streaming in quantity to the polling stations" (Hebrew: "המצביעים הערבים נעים בכמויות אדירות לקלפי") or "The Arabs are streaming to the polling stations" was a statement which the Israeli Prime Minister Benjamin Netanyahu made on 17 March 2015, the day of the elections for the twentieth Knesset. He made the statement in a video which he released for recruiting additional voters for his party, the Likud, through a Gevald campaign. The statement drew widespread criticism against Netanyahu, both in Israel and in the world.

Netanyahu's statement raised a public debate about the issue of defining the State of Israel as a Jewish and democratic state, the national identity of the Israeli Arabs, and addressing their right to vote for the Knesset.

== Background ==
During the election campaign, Netanyahu said that significant financial resources were invested both in Israel and out of Israel for increasing the voter turnout among the left-wing Israelis, and in particular among the Israeli Arabs, in order to achieve the victory of the left-wing formation in the elections, with the support of the Arab parties. In an interview with Israel Hayom, Netanyahu said: "1=There is a coalition which is driven by hidden and overt elements, whose goal is to overthrow the Likud from ruling and replace it with a left-wing government [...] I am talking about very large forces [...] tens of millions of shekels which are brought from abroad, in order to do two things: bringing much larger numbers of left-wing voters to the polls, and bringing a massive turnout of Israeli Arabs at the polls. These are well-funded associations which can reach the 16 seats of Arab MKs and beat the elections."

On 15 March 2015, two days before the elections, a mass rally of right-wing organizations was held in the Rabin Square. In his speech at the rally, Netanyahu repeated the message: "1=Something is happening in these elections which was initially hidden, and now I am sure that you are all aware of it. Enormous capital is being poured out of the country into the left-wing associations and the V15 Association

The latest polls, which were published four days before the elections, showed a four-seat advantage for the Zionist Union. In the afternoon of the day before the elections, about 5,000 Israeli Arab students who studied at universities in Jordan and Jenin, began arriving in Israel to vote. The organized transportation was initiated by the students, and was funded by the Joint List, which provided transportation by bus from the universities to their homes and back. Several news sites reported on the morning of the election day that voter turnout was high in the Arab sector. The Joint List reported 10% voter turnout by 10 a.m., compared to 3% in the previous elections.

== The statement ==
In the morning of the election day, 17 March 2015, Hezki Baruch from Channel 7 arrived at the Prime Minister's House to interview Netanyahu. Before the interview, Hezki received a text message from Uzi Baruch, the Editor-in-Chief of Channel 7 who was also his brother. Uzi wrote that the vote percentage of the Israeli Arab sector was three times greater than in the previous elections. Hezki told it to Netanyahu, and Netanyahu said in the interview that the Arab voters were streaming to the polling stations, funded by left-wing associations. Immediately after the interview, Netanyahu asked Topaz Luk, Head of the Likud's New Media headquarters, to make a video about it, which became viral.

According to the findings of the police investigation in Case 4000, which were published in the indictment in February 2019, Netanyahu instructed Nir Hefetz to forward to Shaul Elovitch and Walla CEO Ilan Yeshua the video, which was displayed as the main headline on the Walla website on the election day for many hours. At the trial, Hefetz testified that he, Netanyahu, and Luke were involved in filming the video, and that three versions were filmed.

We enter the study room, he, I and the head of the Likud's new media headquarters, Topaz Luk. He takes three takes of the video on his iPhone, and I stand with both hands on the door. A dramatic moment in Netanyahu's eyes, that no one will enter. Netanyahu chooses from among the takes the video which he thinks is the best, and we purchase through the cell phone companies which the text messages will arrive within 20 minutes after releasing the video. Filber reports to us that 700,000 mobile devices have received it in the areas that we marked, up to the level of a neighborhood where there is a high percentage of Likud voters. Everyone receives it.

— Testimony of Nir Hefetz, Case 4000 trial, November 2021

== Reactions ==
Immediately upon the release of the video, the statement "Arab voters are streaming in quantity to the polling stations" got a real attention of the mass media in Israel and around the world.

The Means of the communication which mentioned the statement were The Guardian, The New York Times, The Washington Post, Politico, the American television channel MSNBC, the website Salon and The Al Jazeera Media Network in the United States.

Shelly Yachimovich of the Zionist Union and Ahmad Tibi of the Joint List claimed that Netanyahu's words were racist, and made an attack upon the democratic suffrage of the Israeli Arabs. Netanyahu responded to this criticism against him on election day, claiming that there was nothing wrong with the Arabs voting themselves, but rather with the huge amounts of money from the leftist associations and foreign governments for bringing them to the polling stations in an organized manner, which distorting the real will of all voters, who are Israeli citizens, in favor of the left.

The Journalist Uri Misgav claimed that the left-wing associations did not organize the transportation of Arab voters to the polling stations, and that Netanyahu knowingly deceived. Professor Uzzi Ornan expressed his opinion about Netanyahu's words: "1=It was a vile act. Let us call it by its proper name – demagoguery aimed at the ignorant masses. The hallmark of demagogues is that they tell lies. After all, there were no buses, and the Arabs did not flock. Netanyahu directed his words at that ignorant audience that did not know whether it is true or false, and the moment they heard it from his mouth, they thought it was the truth, and headed to the polling stations."

A day after the Netanyahu's statement, an official response was issued by the White House Press Secretary, Josh Earnest, who said that the American administration was deeply concerned about the rhetoric which marginalized the Israeli Arabs.

On 25 March 2015, the President of Israel, Reuven Rivlin, was indirectly asked to comment on the Netanyahu's statement at the ceremony of accepting the official election results, and said: "1=A high voter turnout is a blessing for democracy – woe to us if we see fulfilling the democratic duty of voting as a curse. Those who are afraid of ballots, will end up receiving stones thrown in the streets."

On 21 May 2015, an interview between the President Barack Obama and the journalist Jeffrey Goldberg was published in the magazine The Atlantic. Obama said that the Netanyahu's statements during the election campaign against the Arab citizens of Israel, could have implications for United States policy toward Israel, and reiterated that the comments contradicted the wording of the Israeli Declaration of Independence, which stipulated the equality for all citizens regardless of race and religion.

=== Benjamin Netanyahu ===
On 23 March 2015, six days after the elections, Netanyahu held a meeting at the Prime Minister's Residence in Jerusalem with Arab citizens, Druze, Bedouin and Circassians. Netanyahu said: "1=I know that what I said a few days ago, hurt the Israeli Arabs. I had no intention of doing so. I regret it". Netanyahu added that his actions as prime minister, including investments in minority sectors, prove that he did not intend for his statement, and reiterated his position that no organization outside Israel could interfere in its democratic processes. The meeting was covered in the media. According to Nahum Barnea, Ben Caspit and Barak Ravid, Netanyahu's expression of regret was not aimed at the Arabs, but at the international community and the American administration in particular.

The National Committee for the Heads of the Arab Local Authorities in Israel rejected the Netanyahu's expression of regret because, according to it, the participants in the meeting did not represent the Arabs of Israel and their representative institutions, including The National Committee for the Heads of the Arab Authorities. The Joint List claimed that the participants in the meeting were representatives of the Likud and therefore did not represent the Arab sector, and the Netanyahu's apology was not reflected in actual actions of the Netanyahu's policy.

On 21 May 2015, Netanyahu met Ayman Odeh, the chairman of the Joint List, and they discussed the social and economic advancement of the Arab citizens in Israel. At the end of the meeting, Odeh said that he came with a great responsibility, as someone who represented the large minority in the country, a minority which, as a part of a despicable election tactic, the Prime Minister chose to incite against it and against its very citizenship.

In January 2021, during his visit to the city of Nazareth ahead of the 2021 Israeli legislative elections, Netanyahu reiterated that his intention in his remarks was to warn against voting for the Joint List and not to warn against the actual voting of Arab citizens of Israel. He added that he had apologized in the past if his words had been misunderstood and that he was doing so also now.

=== Protection of the Statement ===
Some members of the Republican Party in the United States, including the senator John McCain, responded to Obama's criticism by saying that it was a campaign announcement and nothing more.

According to Boaz Bismuth when he was a journalist, Netanyahu's statement was based upon a legitimate political considerations, since most members of the Joint List, who represented the Arab voters, were not Zionists. He stated that Netanyahu could have phrased it more sensitively, and supported his apology.

The American television host Bill Maher said that Netanyahu's statement should not be compared to a theoretical statement by an American politician warning against massive African Americans voting, because the United States was not surrounded by African hostile countries. In this context, he mentioned the United States' treatment of Japanese citizens after the attack on Pearl Harbor.

On 10 December 2016, at an event in Mevaseret Zion, the Coalition Chairman, MK David Bitan, said that Netanyahu's statement was spot on, as it was intended to increase the voter turnout in the Jewish sector, which was low at that time compared to the previous elections.

Towards the April 2019 Israeli legislative elections, the Hadash–Ta'al list used the slogan "Streaming to the polling stations!" as its election campaign.

On the 2021 Israeli legislative election day, Avigdor Lieberman, the chairman of Yisrael Beiteinu, said that the ultra-Orthodox were streaming to the polling stations.
