= Shirly Pinto =

Former Member of Knesset

- שירלי פינטו
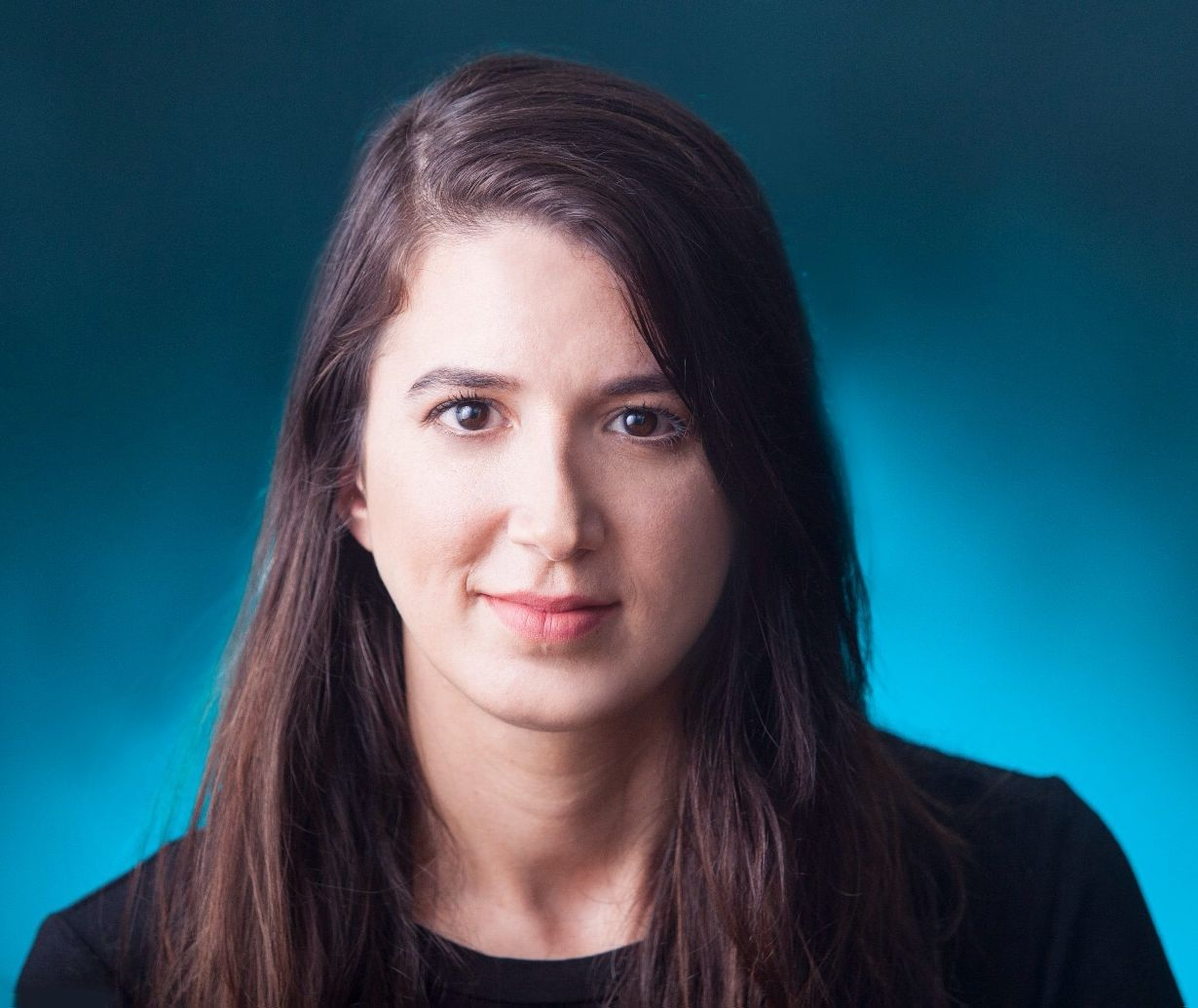
- Shirly Pinto, 2017

Faction represented in the Knesset
- 2021–2022: Yamina
- 2022: National Unity

Personal details
- Born: 15 March 1989 (age 37) Kiryat Bialik, Israel
- Website: shirlypinto.co.il

Shirly Pinto (Hebrew: שירלי פינטו; born 15 March 1989) is an Israeli Deaf political activist, who served as Member of the Knesset for National Unity.

Pinto is fluent in Israeli Sign Language as well as Hebrew and is one of the founders of The Israeli Center for Deaf Studies.

== Biography ==
Pinto was born to Deaf parents, and raised in the Krayot. Her mother is deaf-blind, and part of the Nalaga'at theater group.

Pinto attended the Carmel Zvulun Regional High School in Kibbutz Yagur, electing to study graphic design and social science. She received a complete matriculation diploma, graduating with honors.

Pinto spent most of her childhood with her mother's parents, as well as with her signing parents. This way she acquired a full knowledge of two languages, Israeli sign language alongside Hebrew language, giving her emotional strength and self-esteem between two worlds. Since her childhood, she has seen the difficulty and lack of linguistic accessibility in her parents, who coped daily with the authorities and the general public. Pinto's life was also a daily struggle because of a lack of awareness in the public. When she grew up, she decided to devote her life to changing this reality of Deaf and hard-of-hearing people.

At the age of 18, despite being exempted from compulsory military service, Pinto enlisted in the Israel Defense Forces. She served in the Israeli Air Force Technical Corps. After the initial two-year service, Pinto continued as a career officer, and in 2009 she received an outstanding medal from the Air Force commander and was recognized by President Shimon Peres for her exceptional service.

In 2011 Pinto enrolled for a law degree at the Netanya Academic College and participated in the college's excellence program. During her studies, she participated in a delegation to the International Labour Organization at the United Nations in Geneva. In 2013 she worked as a paralegal for Judge Benjamin Arnon in Israel's Central District Court. In 2014 she interned for Member of Knesset Karin Elharar, handling legislation, public appeals and drafting policies to aid people with disabilities.

Since 2016 Pinto has been a lecturer for the studies of Sign Language Interpreting, at Bar-Ilan University.

In 2017 Pinto interned at the law office of Furth, Wilensky, Mizrachi and Knaani.

== Public activism ==
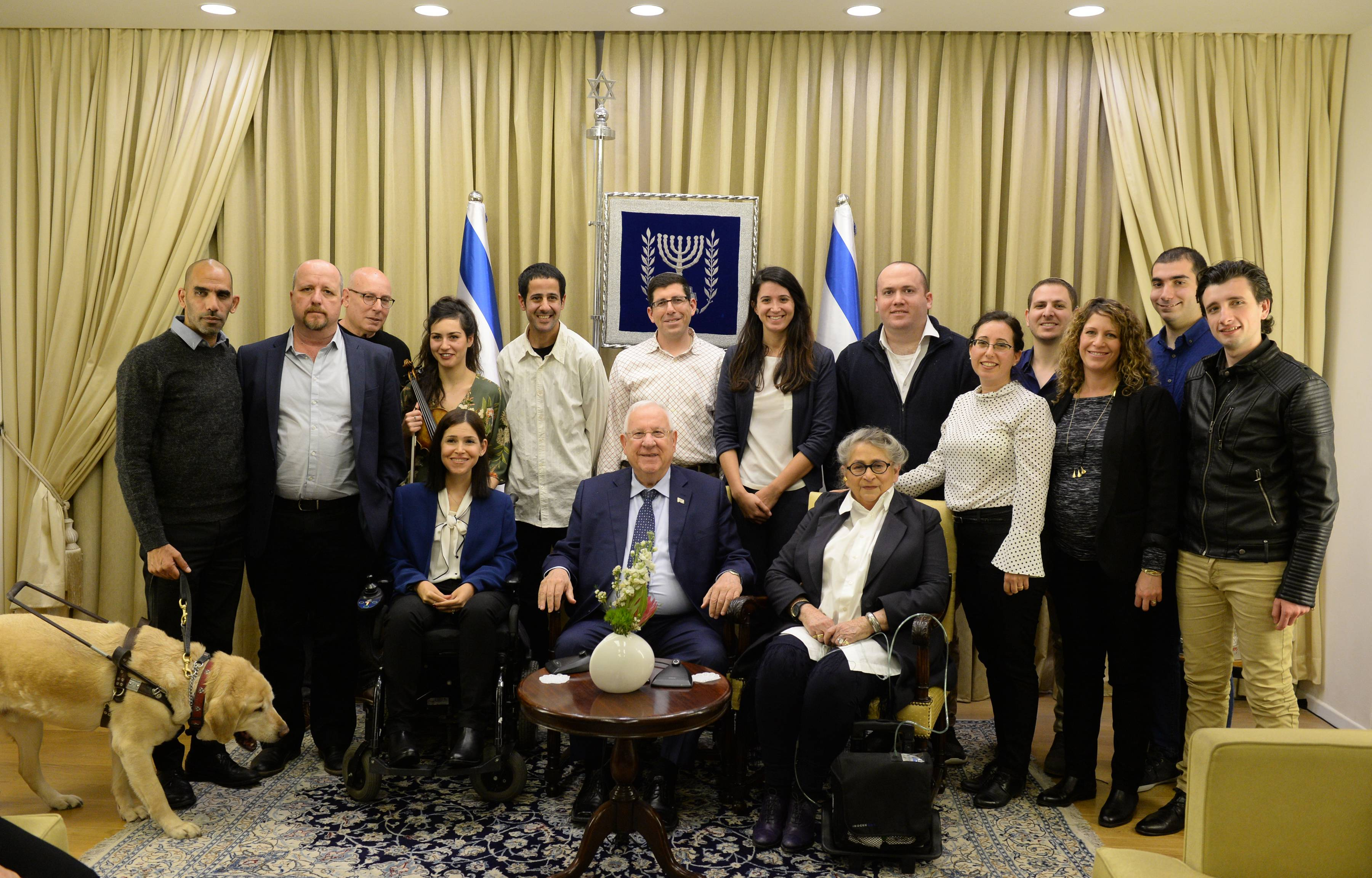
Shirley Pinto (standing seventh) is hosted at the Israeli President's House at a special "Leadership and Disability" meeting, in which research and a survey of the public attitudes towards the leadership of people with disabilities were presented, January 2018

In 2014 Pinto joined the "Shema for Education and Rehabilitation of Deaf and hard-of-hearing Children and Youth", where she was later employed as an instructor and an informal educational activity coordinator. Later she was appointed as a manager of the regional Gush Dan club. In May 2015, Pinto initiated an Israeli delegation to India, for assistance and legal-educational counselling to deaf children and youth in Indore.

In 2016 she established the Israeli Center for the Deaf Studies with other deaf founders. Its goals are to promote the status of Deaf and hard-of-hearing people who use sign language; to recognize the equality of sign language and spoken languages; and to create an awareness of the need for the Deaf to be accessible and accepted by the general public.

Pinto led the "I sign I am Equal" public campaign for changing the consciousness of the importance of sign language in public, and for promoting legislation of the Israeli Sign Language as a recognized language in Israel. In this campaign, she led an awareness week of the Deaf people, under the slogan "I sign, I am whole" (a Hebrew word play). The campaign swept hundreds of thousands, and Education Minister Naftali Bennett joined. Following the campaign, Ben-Gurion University of the Negev was the first university in Israel to recognize Israeli Sign Language as an official language for Deaf people in Israel. In March 2017, the university hosted a ceremony in which Pinto presented a certificate of appreciation from the Center for the Deaf Studies to Rivka Carmi, the president of the university, for its actions.

In 2017, Pinto initiated a bill to make public service announcements on the television in sign language, which was led by MK Issawi Frej and MK Eitan Cabel. Later that year, in cooperation with the Ruderman Family Foundation, Pinto arranged a meeting with Academy Award winning actress Marlee Matlin with the community of the Deaf and hard of hearing people in Israel. Over 300 people attended the event, hosted at the Tel Aviv Cinematheque.

Over the years Pinto has spearheaded public campaigns for better inclusion of Deaf people in society. She had dealt with problems in the education system, the lack of accessibility to health services and lack of adequate public infrastructure. Since 2015 Pinto has worked to strengthen the ties between Israel and the countries of the world, to improve the visibility of the population of Deaf and hard of hearing and the Advancement of Israel, and was chosen to represent Israel at a conference of the World Federation of the Deaf in November 2017 in Budapest in Hungary. During the conference, Pinto learned about a global initiative to prevent the sterilization of Deaf women. Pinto also met Helga Stevens, a Deaf woman and a member of the European Parliament, and told her about the Deaf community in Israel versus the Deaf communities in Europe. At her speech at the Federation, Pinto spoke about the importance of integrating Deaf and hard-of-hearing people who use both sign language and non-sign language as one whole population. Upon her return to Israel, Pinto was interviewed on Channel 20 about it.

At the beginning of October 2017, Pinto turned to the welfare minister Haim Katz and asked him that during the intermediate days of Sukkot and Passover, the telephone relay service should be operated by the Institute for the Advancement of the Deaf. At the beginning of December 2017, Katz replied to Pinto that her request had been received and that the service would be operated on the basis of a shortened working day.

On 5 December 2017, Pinto told the Knesset Science and Technology Committee that Deaf and hard-of-hearing customers do not hear their names on the announcement after ordering self-service meals, and suggested that the business would lend them a vibrating sign which would be drawn when their order was ready.

On 3 January 2018, Pinto, a State Control Committee in the Knesset headed by Shelly Yachimovich, said that 45 hours of translation per year is not enough for Deaf Holocaust survivors, who need to get to hospitals and doctors younger.[18]

Pinto was a candidate for the municipal elections in Ramat Gan.

=== Interviews to promote the integration of the Deaf and hard of hearing ===
Pinto interviewed[19][20] the teaching of Deaf students and hearing-impaired individual schools combined and combined classroom, with no individual combined acoustic accessibility,[21] and combined classroom teachers acquire knowledge of Israeli sign language consisting of only 36 hours. Pinto also wrote a column about it in Israel Today.[22]

At the opening of the Awareness Week for the Deaf, on 10 September 2017, she spoke of her work as a single Deaf practitioner throughout the country in a law firm, of Deaf lawyers who became self-employed due to their lack of integration into law firms, and of the need for accessibility in employment and health services.[23]

Following the exposure of sexual harassment by Harvey Weinstein, Pinto said that the Deaf woman's difficulty in dealing with sexual harassment is double, both as a woman and as a Deaf woman, who is forced to communicate with the professional staff on the subject. Pinto's conclusion was that a sign language control team was needed, preferably for Deaf professionals.[24] On 12 July 2021, Pinto made her first speech at the Knesset plenum.

Pinto announced on 3 August 2022 that she would not join Zionist Spirit (a merger of Yamina and Derekh Eretz) ahead of the 2022 Israeli legislative election. She had joined National Unity's electoral list on 22 August.

== Personal life ==
Pinto lives in Ramat Gan and is married to Michael Kadosh, a player in the Israeli Futsal national team and an employee as an engineer in telecommunications in Israel. They have a son and a daughter.

== See also ==
- Deaf Culture
