= Benny Gantz =

Israeli general and politician (born 1959)

- בֵּנִי גַּנְץ
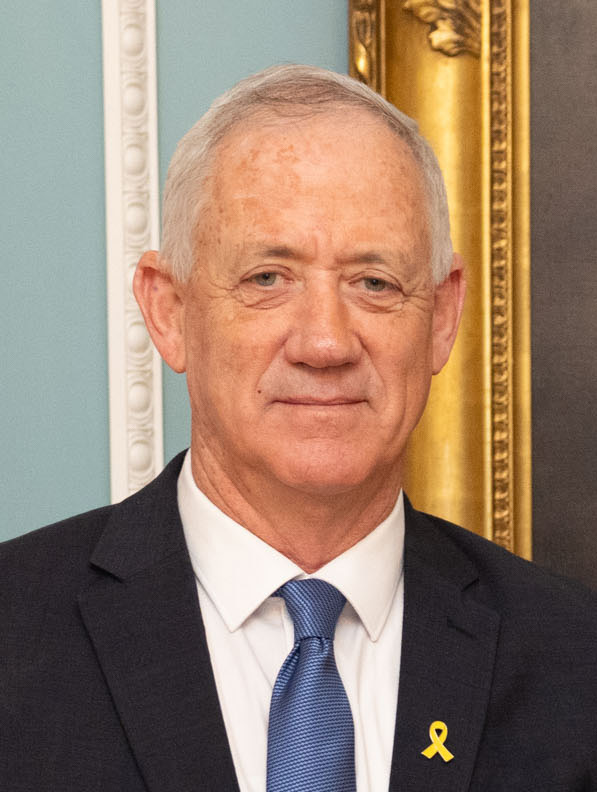
- Gantz in 2024

Alternate Prime Minister of Israel
- In office 17 May 2020 – 13 June 2021
- President: Reuven Rivlin
- Prime Minister: Benjamin Netanyahu
- Preceded by: Office established
- Succeeded by: Yair Lapid

Speaker of the Knesset
- In office 26 March 2020 – 17 May 2020
- Preceded by: Yuli Edelstein
- Succeeded by: Yariv Levin

Leader of the Opposition
- De facto 30 April 2019 – 17 May 2020
- Prime Minister: Benjamin Netanyahu
- Preceded by: Shelly Yachimovich
- Succeeded by: Yair Lapid

Ministerial roles
- 2020–2022: Minister of Defense
- 2021: Minister of Justice
- 2021–2022: Deputy Prime Minister
- 2023–2024: Minister without portfolio
- 2023–2024: Member of the war cabinet

Faction represented in the Knesset
- 2019–2022: Blue and White
- 2022–2025: National Unity
- 2025–2026: Blue and White

Military roles
- 2011–2015: Chief of the General Staff

Personal details
- Born: Benjamin Gantz; 9 June 1959 (age 67) Kfar Ahim, Israel
- Party: Blue and White (since 2018)
- Spouse: Revital
- Children: 4
- Education: Tel Aviv University; University of Haifa; National Defense University
- Nickname: Benny

Military service
- Allegiance: Israel
- Branch/service: Israeli Armed Forces
- Years of service: 1977–2015
- Rank: Rav Aluf
- Unit: Paratroopers Brigade
- Commands: 890 "Efe" (Echis) Airborne Battalion (1987–1989); Shaldag Unit (1989–1992); Reserve Paratroopers Brigade (1992–1994); Judea Regional Brigade (1994–1995); Paratroopers Brigade (1995–1997); "Etgar" Division (1998–1999); Lebanon Liaison Unit (1999–2000); Northern Corps (2001), Judea and Samaria Division (2000–2002); Northern Command (2002–2005); Ground Forces Command (2005–2007); Military Attaché in the United States (2007–2009); Deputy Chief of General Staff (2009–2010); Chief of the General Staff (2011–2015)
- Battles/wars: 1978 South Lebanon conflict; 1982 Lebanon War; South Lebanon conflict (1985–2000); First Intifada; Second Intifada; 2006 Lebanon War; Operation Summer Rains; Operation Cast Lead; Operation Pillar of Defense; Operation Protective Edge
- Awards: Commander of the Legion of Merit (United States)

Benjamin "Benny" Gantz (Hebrew: בִּנְיָמִין "בֵּנִי" גַּנְץ [binjaˈmin ˈbeni ˈɡant͡s]; born 9 June 1959) is an Israeli politician and retired army general. He served as a minister without portfolio from 2023 to 2024, as the minister of defense between 2020 and 2022, and as deputy prime minister between 2021 and 2022. From 2020 to 2021, he was the alternate prime minister.

He served as the 20th Chief of General Staff of the Israel Defense Forces (IDF) from 2011 to 2015. In December 2018, he entered politics by establishing a new political party named Israel Resilience. The party later allied itself with Telem and Yesh Atid to form Blue and White (Hebrew: Kaḥol Lavan), the colours of the Israeli national flag. In 2022, Gantz became the leader of National Unity, made up of the Israel Resilience Party and New Hope.

Gantz was the 17th speaker of the Knesset from 26 March 2020 to 17 May 2020. On 20 April 2020, Gantz agreed to join a rotation government with Prime Minister Benjamin Netanyahu. Under the terms of the agreement, Gantz was to serve as alternate prime minister and minister of defense, before succeeding Netanyahu as prime minister in November 2021. However, the coalition collapsed, resulting in another election in 2021. As defense minister, Gantz was in charge of Operation Guardian of the Walls in Gaza. In June 2021, he was reappointed defense minister and became deputy prime minister in the new Bennett-Lapid government, serving in those roles until December 2022.

On 12 October 2023, following the breakout of the Gaza war, the National Unity party announced that it would form a war cabinet with Likud. Gantz was appointed a minister without portfolio in the thirty-seventh government, led by Prime Minister Benjamin Netanyahu. On 13 June 2024, Gantz and Gadi Eisenkot exited the war cabinet, which was dissolved four days later.

== Early life and education ==
Benjamin Gantz was born on 9 June 1959 in Kfar Ahim, Israel, which his parents helped settle. He was an only child.

His mother Malka (née Weiss, Hungarian: Margit Weisz) was a Holocaust survivor, a survivor of Bergen-Belsen, originally from Mezőkovácsháza, Hungary.

His father Nahum Gantz Ostolish came from Sovata (Hungarian: Szováta), in the more ethnically-Hungarian part of Transylvania, Romania, where his parents were Munkatsher Hassidim, a Haredi sect founded in Mukachevo (Yiddish: מונקאטש, romanized: Munkatsh), Transcarpathia, then Hungary, now Ukraine. He survived the Dragomirești Ghetto, Auschwitz, Harzungen and Woffleben, sub-sub-camps of Buchenwald. Ostolish migrated to Palestine on the Arlozorov, an illegal aliyah ship. British authorities in Palestine arrested Ostolish for trying to enter the country illegally. He was an active member of the Labor Party and at one point a possible Knesset candidate. He served as the mapainik (local representative of the Mapai party), a head of the moshav movement, and the community's baal toke'a, blowing the shofar (ram's horn) on Rosh Hashana.

His parents were among the founders of Moshav Kfar Ahim, a cooperative agricultural community in south-central Israel. In his youth, he attended the Shafir High School in Merkaz Shapira, and boarding school at the HaKfar HaYarok youth village in Ramat HaSharon.

According to his father, Benny Gantz was not religious and chose not to serve as the baal toke'a and does not know the Gaavad (chief rabbi of a rabinnical court) of Komemiyut (a nearby town in the Negev), but continued in his father's Zionist beliefs serving in the military, and holds "close to his heart" the memory of the Holocaust which Benny stated was present, "there, in the experience of the house".

Gantz is a graduate of the IDF Command and Staff College and the National Security College. He holds a bachelor's degree in history from Tel Aviv University, a master's degree in political science from the University of Haifa, and an additional master's degree in National Resources Management from the National Defense University in the United States.

== Military career ==
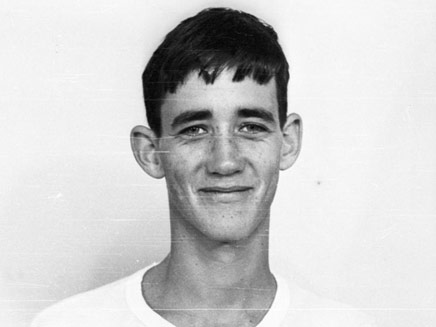
Gantz's IDF induction photo, 1977

Gantz was drafted into the IDF in 1977. He volunteered as a paratrooper in the Paratroopers Brigade. His first mission as a young conscript in 1977 was as part of the security detail for Egyptian President Anwar Sadat's visit to Israel. As a paratrooper, he fought in Operation Litani in March 1978 and also participated in a June 1978 raid against a Fatah training base in Lebanon. In 1979, Gantz became an officer after completing Officer Candidate School. He returned to the Paratroopers Brigade and served as a platoon leader and company commander, completed a course in the U.S. Army Special Forces, and fought in the First Lebanon War.

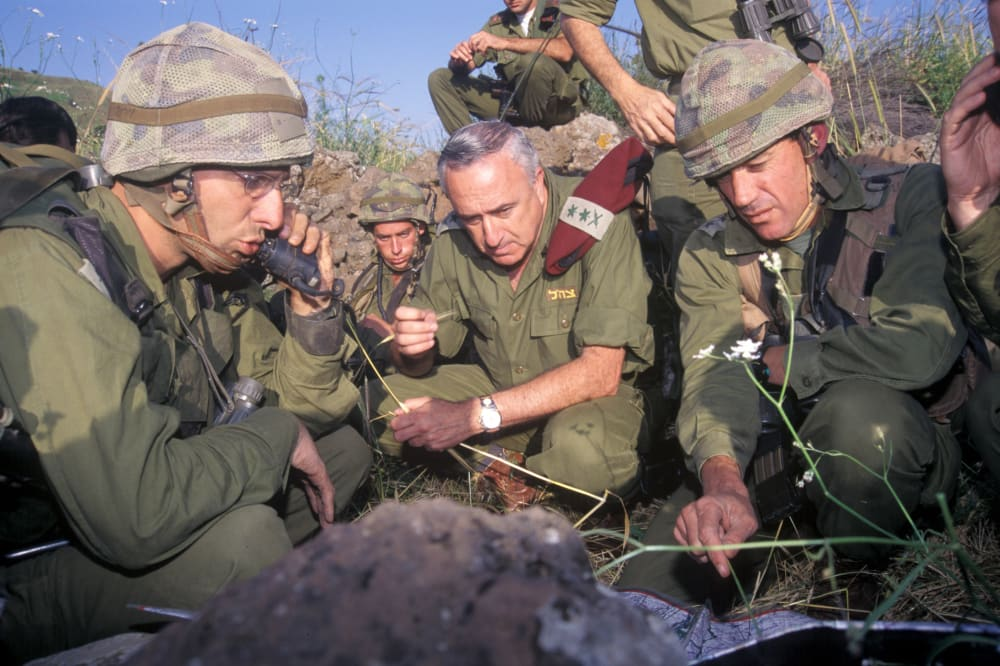
Colonel Benny Gantz with IDF Chief of Staff Amnon Lipkin-Shahak during a Paratroopers Brigade exercise, 1996

Later on, he led 890 "Efe" (Echis) paratroop battalion in counter-guerrilla operations in the South Lebanon security zone. In 1991, he commanded the commando unit that was on the ground in Addis Ababa, Ethiopia, for 36 hours, securing the Operation Solomon airlift of 14,000 Ethiopian Jews to Israel. He served in senior command positions during the Second Intifada and Second Lebanon War.

In the course of his military career, Gantz served as commander of the Shaldag Unit in the Israeli Air Force; commander of the 35th Paratroopers Brigade; commander of the Reserves Division in the Northern Command; commander of the Lebanon Liaison Unit; commander of the Judea and Samaria Division in 2000, before becoming the commander of the Israeli Northern Command in 2001; and as Israel's military attaché in the United States from 2005 until 2009, before becoming the deputy chief of the General Staff.

During his service, Gantz was given the nickname "Benny-chuta" ("benichuta", meaning "tranquil" or "easygoing") for his "non-confrontational manner".

=== Chief of staff ===
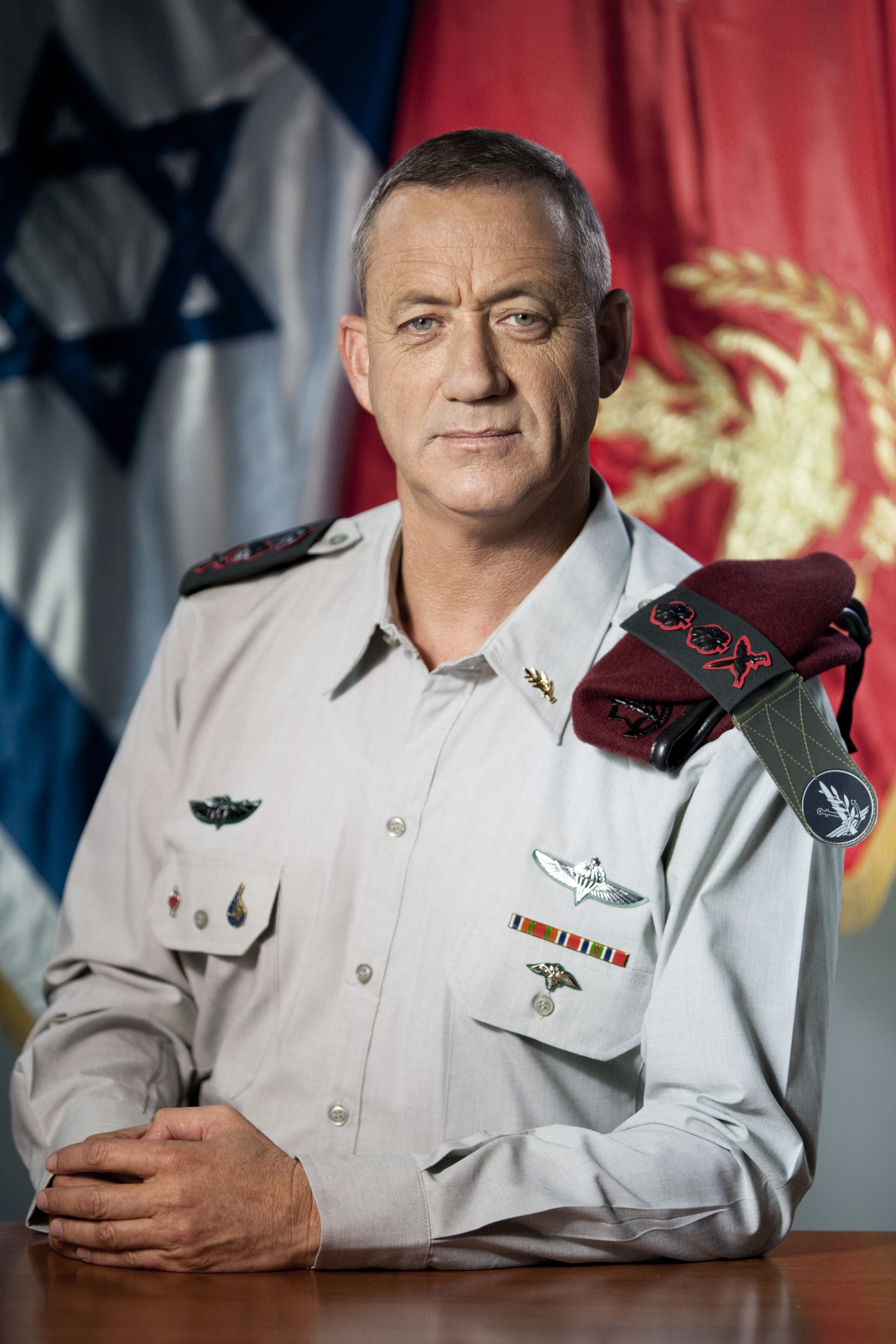
Gantz as Chief of General Staff

Following the canceled appointment of previous nominee Aluf Yoav Galant, Defense Minister Ehud Barak announced on 5 February 2011 that he would be recommending to the government that Gantz be appointed the 20th Chief of the General Staff (after the pending approval by the Turkel Advisory Committee on Senior Appointments and a government vote). Gantz had already been in the process of an honorable discharge from his army service.

On 13 February 2011, the Israeli government unanimously approved Gantz to be the next IDF chief of staff. According to The Jerusalem Post, Prime Minister Benjamin Netanyahu stated in the weekly Cabinet meeting in Jerusalem that Gantz was an "excellent officer and experienced commander, and had rich operational and logistical experience, with all the attributes needed to be a successful army commander". Attorney Avi'ad Vissuli of the Forum for the Land of Israel unsuccessfully petitioned to revoke the appointment.

On 14 February 2011, Gantz returned to the IDF and assumed command as the chief of staff of the Israel Defense Forces. He served for the required three years and was nominated for a fourth year, which he agreed to fulfill, followed by retirement.

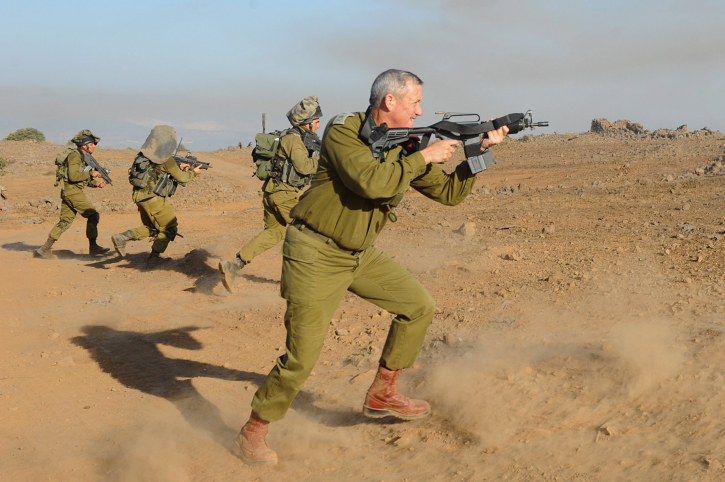
Gantz in fire practice area, Golan Heights, 2012

In his first year as Chief of the General Staff, Gantz appointed the IDF's first-ever female major-general, Orna Barbivai. In July 2011, Gantz appointed a special committee to address a controversy that had developed concerning mention of the word Elohim, "God", in the military Yizkor prayer. The committee determined that a disputed passage should read Yizkor 'Am Yisrael, "May the Nation of Israel remember", and not Yizkor Elohim, "May God remember". Gantz upheld the committee's ruling.

Gantz commanded the IDF when it fought against Palestinian factions in Gaza in the campaigns Operation Pillar of Defense and Operation Protective Edge.

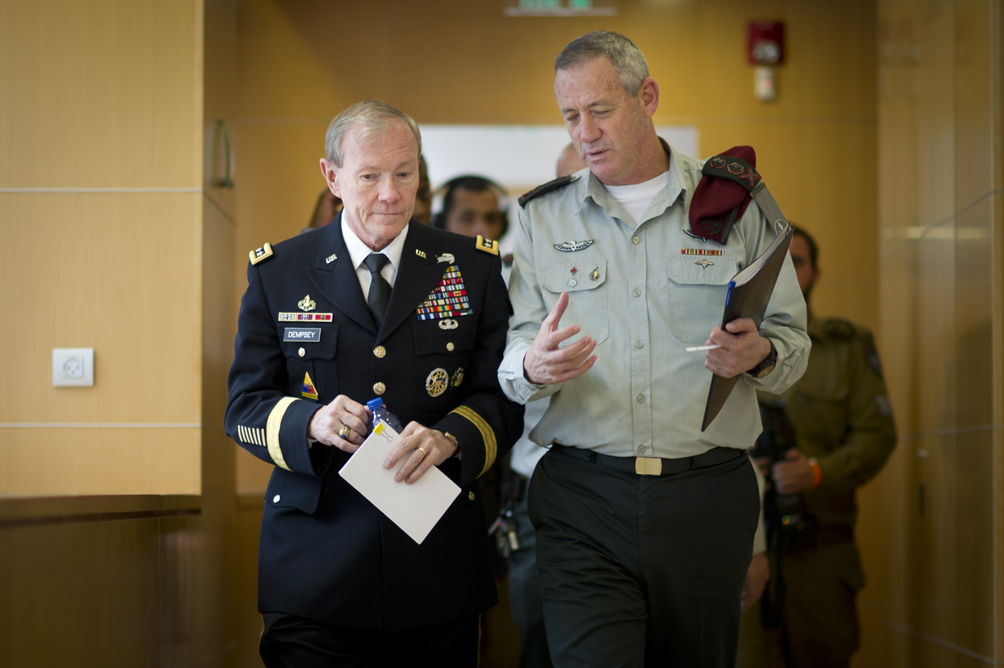
Benny Gantz (right) meets with General Martin Dempsey (left), Chairman of the US Joint Chiefs of Staff, 2012

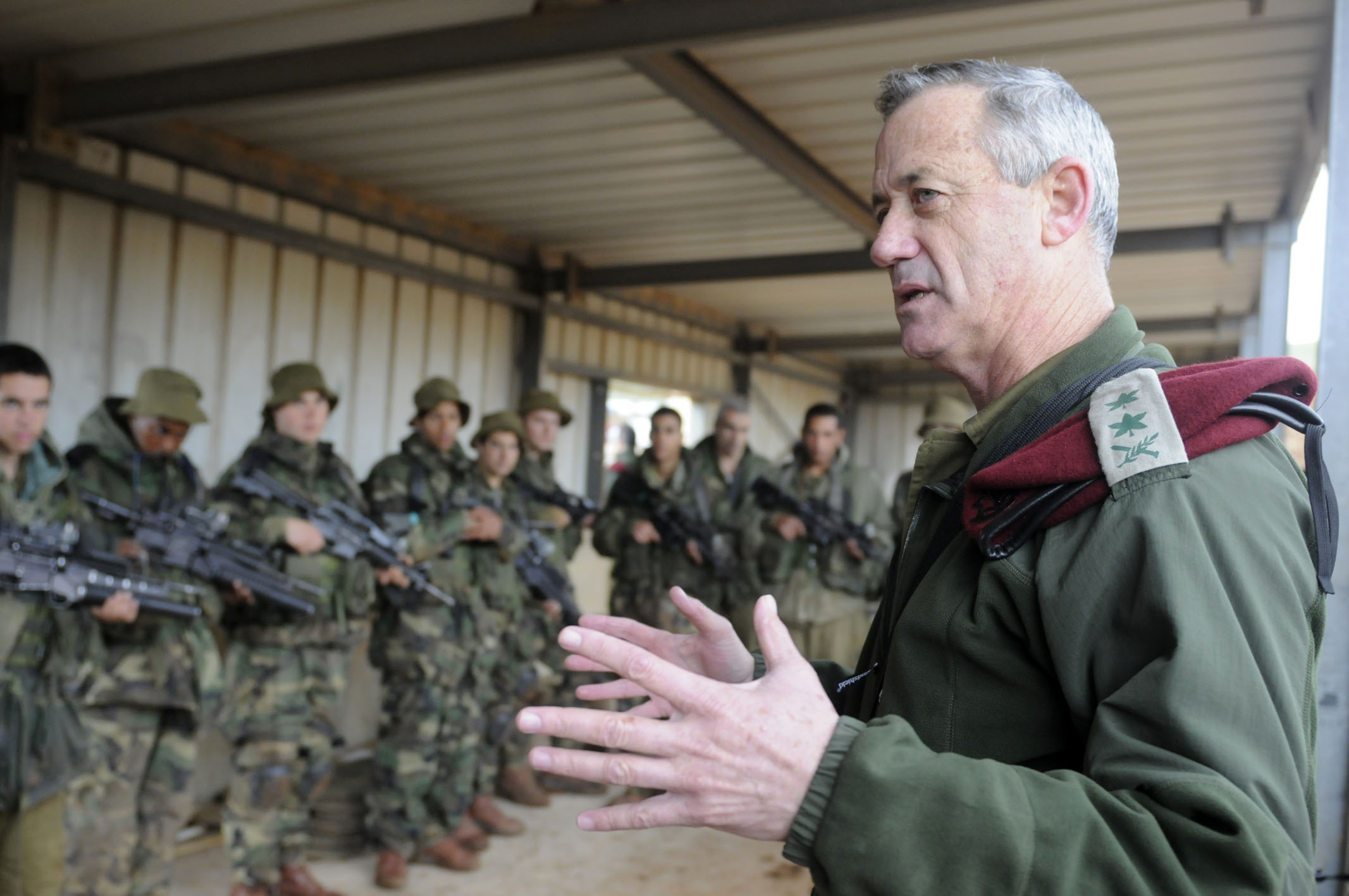
Benny Gantz conducting a surprise visit to training bases as Chief of Staff, 2011

== Business career ==
Gantz was the chairman of the Fifth Dimension, a computer security and law enforcement technology company, which specialized in tracking via smartphone spyware. The company closed due to financial reasons, after its Russian investor Viktor Vekselberg was sanctioned under CAATSA by the United States during the Special Counsel investigation into Russian attempts to interfere with the US election, led by Robert Mueller.

== Political career ==
=== Early career ===
In December 2018, Gantz announced the formation of a new political party, but did not originally disclose his views or name of the organization. Polls demonstrated fluctuating support for the party. On 27 December 2018, Gantz formally established the Israel Resilience Party ("Hosen LeYisrael" in Hebrew), with the intention of running in the upcoming April 2019 election. In his first major political speech on 29 January 2019, Gantz pledged to strengthen Israeli settlement blocs in the West Bank and said that Israel would never leave the Golan Heights. He neither endorsed nor rejected a two-state solution to the Israeli–Palestinian conflict. "The Jordan Valley will be our border, but we won't let millions of Palestinians living beyond the fence to endanger our identity as a Jewish state," he said. In addition, Gantz helped formulate a unilateral separation plan for the Institute for National Security Studies calling for the unilateral creation of a contiguous Palestinian "entity" on 65% of the West Bank and a freeze on construction in settlements outside the major settlement blocs expected to be retained in a future peace agreement in order to stave off the perceived threat of a one-state solution, which the plan termed as being an existential threat to Israel, along with a nuclear Iran.

On 17 February 2019, at the Munich Security Conference, Gantz enumerated the main challenges of the West as "extremist Iran, Islamic terror, and regional instability". Gantz criticized Benjamin Netanyahu's decision to bar U.S. Congresswomen Ilhan Omar and Rashida Tlaib from entering Israel, saying that Omar and Tlaib would have seen that the West Bank is "the second best place" for Arabs in the Middle East. In December 2021, Gantz described the Islamic Republic of Iran as "the biggest threat to the global and regional peace and stability".

Gantz negotiated with leader of the Yesh Atid party Yair Lapid, leader of the Telem party Moshe Ya'alon, and former Chief of Staff Gabi Ashkenazi, as well as with Orly Levy's Gesher. and reached an agreement with these parties, with the exception of Gesher, to form a political alliance and run jointly. the alliance, named Blue and White, was formally announced on 21 February 2019. with Gantz and Lapid agreeing to rotate the position of prime minister with one another if elected.

=== Government formation attempts ===
In the April 2019 election Gantz's Blue and White alliance platform included introducing prime ministerial term limits, barring indicted politicians from serving in the Knesset, amending the nation-state law to include Israeli minorities, limiting the power of the Chief Rabbinate of Israel over marriages, investing in early education, expanding health care, and re-entering negotiations with the Palestinian Authority for a peace agreement. The alliance won 35 seats, tying for first place with Netanyahu's Likud, but winning a smaller share of the popular vote. Following the election, Gantz conceded defeat and Netanyahu received the opportunity to form a government for President Reuven Rivlin, who gave Netanyahu until 29 May to form a governing coalition. Netanyahu was unable to do so, and the mandate to form a government returned to Rivlin. Before he could grant the mandate to another individual, potentially Gantz, Netanyahu successfully pushed to dissolve the Knesset on 30 May, leading to new elections in September.

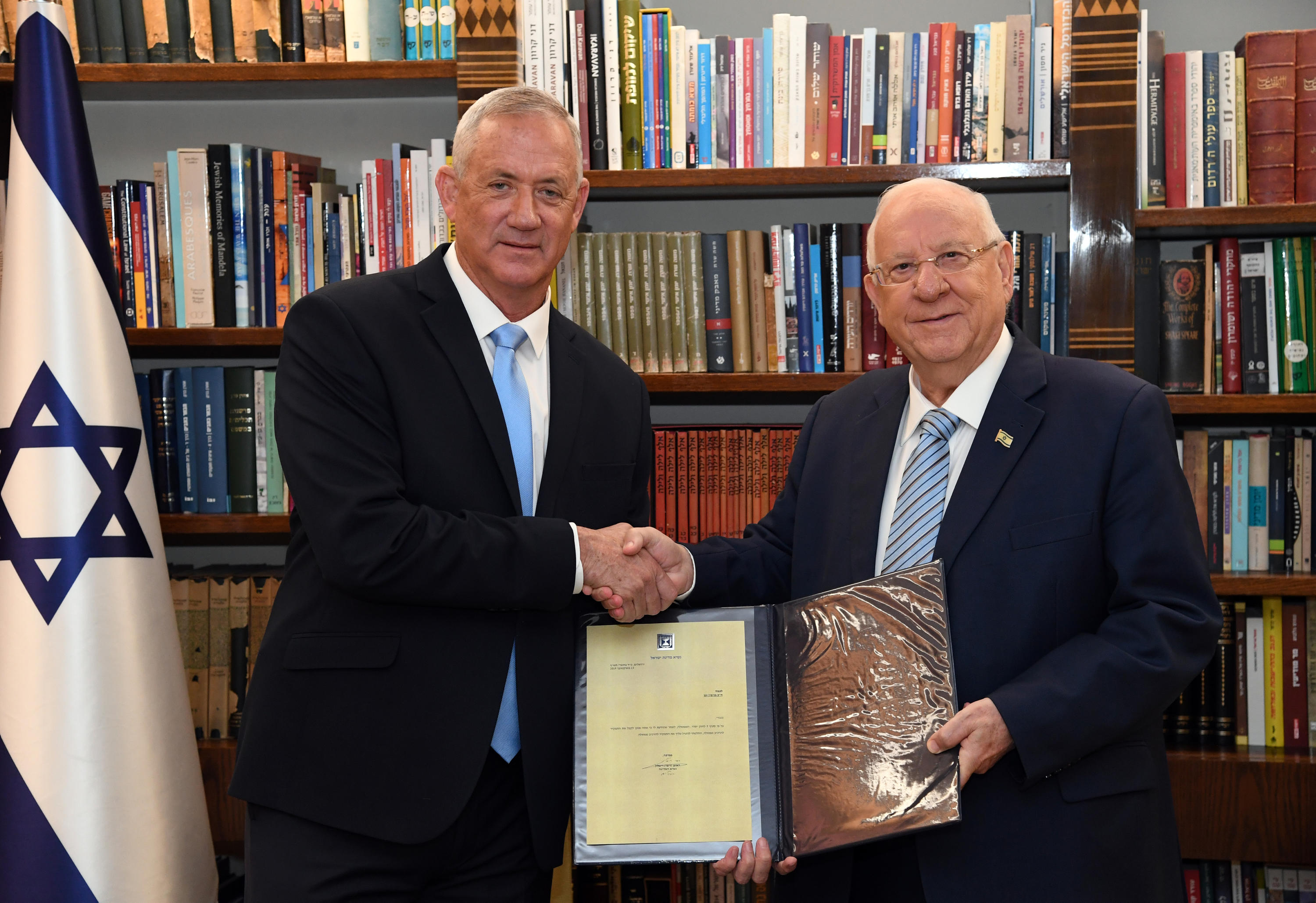
President Reuven Rivlin tasking Gantz with the formation of a government, October 2019

Blue and White won 33 seats in the September election, one more than the Likud's 32 seats. Rivlin met with representatives of all elected parties on 22 and 23 September to receive recommendations on whom to allow to form a government. Gantz received recommendations from Labor-Gesher, the Democratic Union, and the Joint List. The number of Knesset Seats held by all parties that endorsed Gantz was greater than that of those who endorsed Netanyahu. However, on 23 September, members of the Balad party requested that their recommendation of Gantz, given automatically by their membership in the Joint List, be rescinded. Following this, Netanyahu had more recommendations and was chosen by Rivlin to form a government on 25 September, on the condition that he not dissolve the Knesset should he fail to form a government. Netanyahu failed to form a government, and returned the mandate to Rivlin, who gave it to Gantz on 23 October. Gantz failed to form a government, and the mandate passed collectively to the Knesset, who failed to form a government, and dissolved on 12 December, triggering a third election in March 2020. On 19 December, Gantz and Lapid's planned rotation agreement was scrapped, with Gantz becoming Blue and White's sole candidate for prime minister.

The March election resulted in the loss of Blue and White's parliamentary plurality, with the party winning 33 seats to the Likud's 36. On 15 March, Gantz received recommendations from parties that held a combined 61 seats, and was again given a mandate by Rivlin the next day. Before the election, Gantz vowed to form a government that would not include Netanyahu. Initially an attempt was made to form a minority government with external support from the Joint List, however this initiative promptly collapsed as Members of the Knesset from Gantz's Party, Yoaz Hendel and Zvi Hauser announced they would vote against such a government, citing an electoral promise not to lean on the Joint List. During the COVID-19 pandemic in Israel, Gantz reversed his stance and announced he was willing to support an emergency coalition with Netanyahu.

On 26 March, Gantz was elected Speaker of the Knesset by a margin of 74–18, following the resignation of Yuli Edelstein. His nomination was supported by the Likud and members of Netanyahu's right-wing coalition, which put the future of the Blue and White alliance in jeopardy. On 29 March, Yesh Atid and Telem left Blue and White and formed a separate faction in the Knesset.

On 20 April, Gantz and Netanyahu announced that an agreement on a unity government had been reached. The deal would involve both parties sharing power, with Gantz and Netanyahu rotating the position of prime minister. Under the terms of the agreement, Netanyahu remained as prime minister, with Gantz serving as alternate prime minister, and the two set to exchange roles in October 2021. On 7 May, Netanyahu won the support of 72 Members of the Knesset to form a government, with Rivlin giving Netanyahu a two-week mandate to form a government shortly after. The parties who gave their support included Blue and White, Likud, Gesher, Shas and United Torah Judaism, two of the three members of the Labor Party, and Derekh Eretz, formed by Hauser and Hendel. Gantz resigned as speaker of the Knesset on 12 May as part of the coalition agreement, and the new government was sworn in on 17 May, with Gantz being sworn in as alternate prime minister and minister of defense.

=== Minister of defense ===
==== Alternate prime minister ====
In November 2020, Gantz formed a military committee to investigate Case 3000, a corruption case involving the purchase of submarines. the committee's members resigned in late December due to restrictions placed on the investigation by Attorney General Avichai Mandelblit, who was running a parallel investigation. Gantz established a second committee in May 2021 to investigate the treatment of Veterans, after a former soldier of the IDF lit himself on fire in an act of protest.

Despite agreeing to take part in a Netanyahu-led coalition government in light of the COVID-19 pandemic, Gantz opposed the timeline of Netanyahu's annexation plans, he said the Israeli prime minister should instead put the COVID-19 pandemic first. on 23 December, shortly after the expiration of a budgetary deadline, Gantz and Netanyahu's unity government collapsed, triggering new elections in March 2021.

Following the resignation of Avi Nissenkorn as the minister of justice on 30 December, Gantz became the acting minister of justice until 1 April 2021, at which point the position became vacant. Netanyahu nominated Member of the Knesset Ofir Akunis for the position in a cabinet meeting on 27 April 2021. Akunis won a majority in a vote held by the cabinet, but was not confirmed to the position as the vote was ruled illegal by Attorney General Avichai Mandelblit and the Israeli Supreme Court as it was not part of the meeting's pre-written agenda. Gantz was subsequently approved as minister of justice by the cabinet in a legal vote on 28 April.

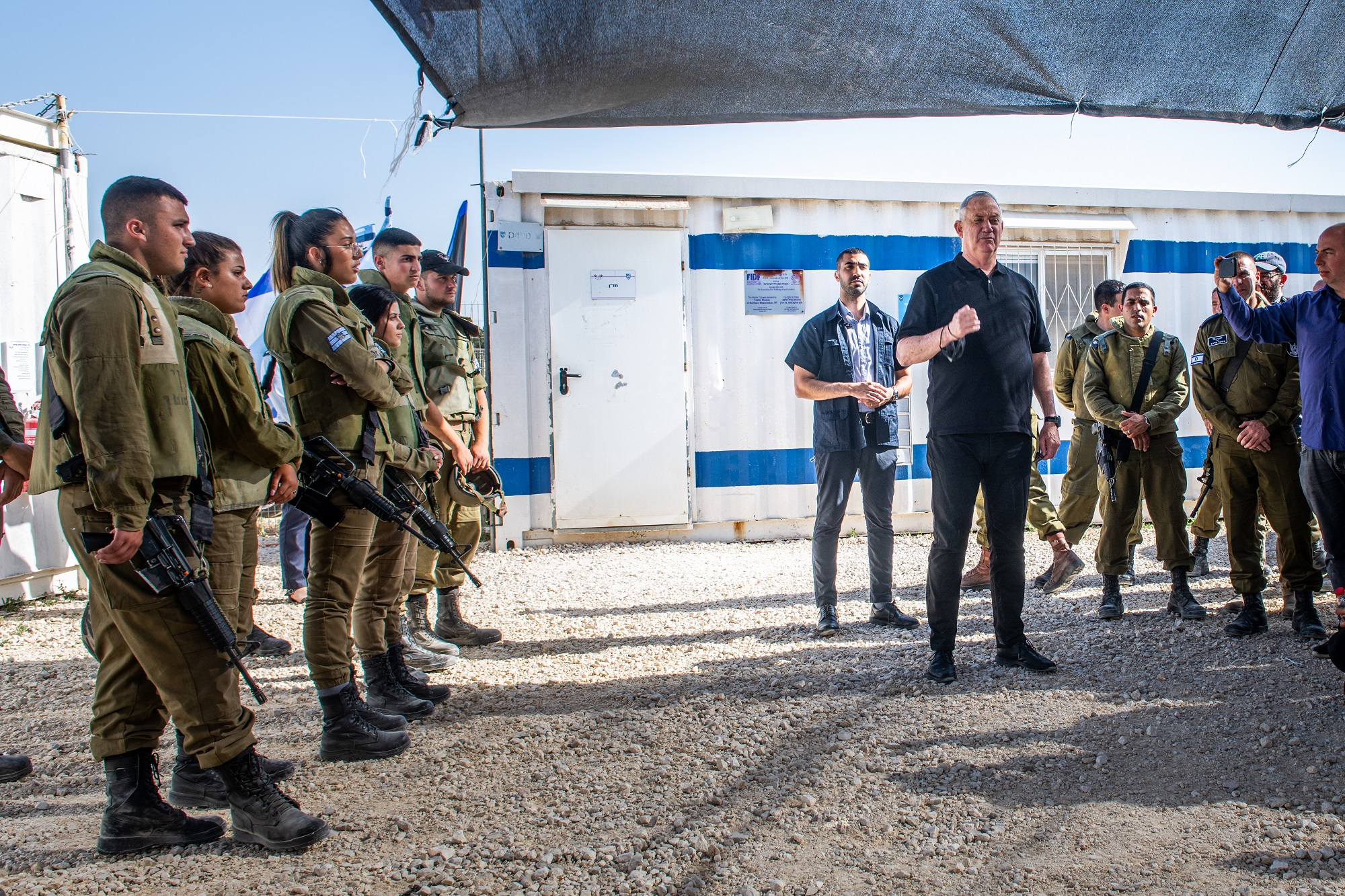
Gantz visiting an Aerial Defense Battery during Operation Guardian of the Walls, May 2021

In May 2021, as defense minister, Gantz presided over Operation Guardian of the Walls, a military operation conducted in the Gaza Strip. During the operation, Israel conducted around 1,500 aerial, land, and sea strikes within the territory. The operation began on 10 May, and ended on 21 May due to a ceasefire between Israel and Hamas, mediated by the Egyptian government.

===== 2021 election campaign and government formation =====
Following the collapse of the Blue and White's alliance with Telem and Yesh Atid, the party often polled at a single digit number of seats, narrowly surpassing, or falling beneath, the electoral threshold. in addition, several members of the party, including Minister of Foreign Affairs Gabi Ashkenazi, Minister of Justice Avi Nissenkorn, Minister of Science, Technology and Space, Yizhar Shai, and Members of the Knesset Ram Shefa, Einav Kabla, and Hila Vazan either retired from politics or defected to another party, while Members of the Knesset Miki Haimovich and Asaf Zamir were removed from the party list by Gantz after voting against a bill meant to delay the dissolution of the Knesset. in the last days of the election, Gantz ran a Gevald campaign, arguing that Blue and White falling beneath the electoral threshold would harm Israeli democracy.

Blue and White won 8 seats in the 2021 election, exceeding the number of seats the party was projected to win in most polls. on 5 April, Rivlin met with representatives of all elected parties. Blue and White recommended Lapid for prime minister, but Netanyahu received a larger number of recommendations, and was given a mandate by Rivlin. Netanyahu failed to form a government, and his mandate expired on 4 May. the next day, Rivlin gave Lapid the mandate to form a government, who entered negotiations with Naftali Bennett to form a unity government, in which Lapid and Bennett would rotate the position of prime minister. Lapid and Bennett formed a government with Ra'am, Meretz, the Labor Party, New Hope, Yisrael Beiteinu and Blue and White. Lapid became the alternate prime minister, and Gideon Sa'ar replaced Gantz as justice minister. Gantz remained the defense minister and became a deputy prime minister. The new government was sworn in on 13 June.

==== Deputy Prime Minister ====
In October 2021, Gantz announced that six Palestinian human rights organizations would be designated as terrorist organizations. The Ministry of Defense claimed that the groups are connected to the Popular Front for the Liberation of Palestine (PFLP) and that funding is being funneled from the groups to the PFLP. As of April 2022, Israel has not publicly released any evidence of such a link.

In November 2021, Gantz became the first Israeli minister of defense to visit Morocco, where he signed an agreement for security cooperation with the Moroccan government. he similarly signed a defense memorandum with the Government of Bahrain.

On 30 May 2022, following violence and racist remarks against Palestinians at the annual Dance of Flags, Gantz called for La Familia and Lehava to be designated as terrorist organizations.

=== 2022 election and return to the opposition ===
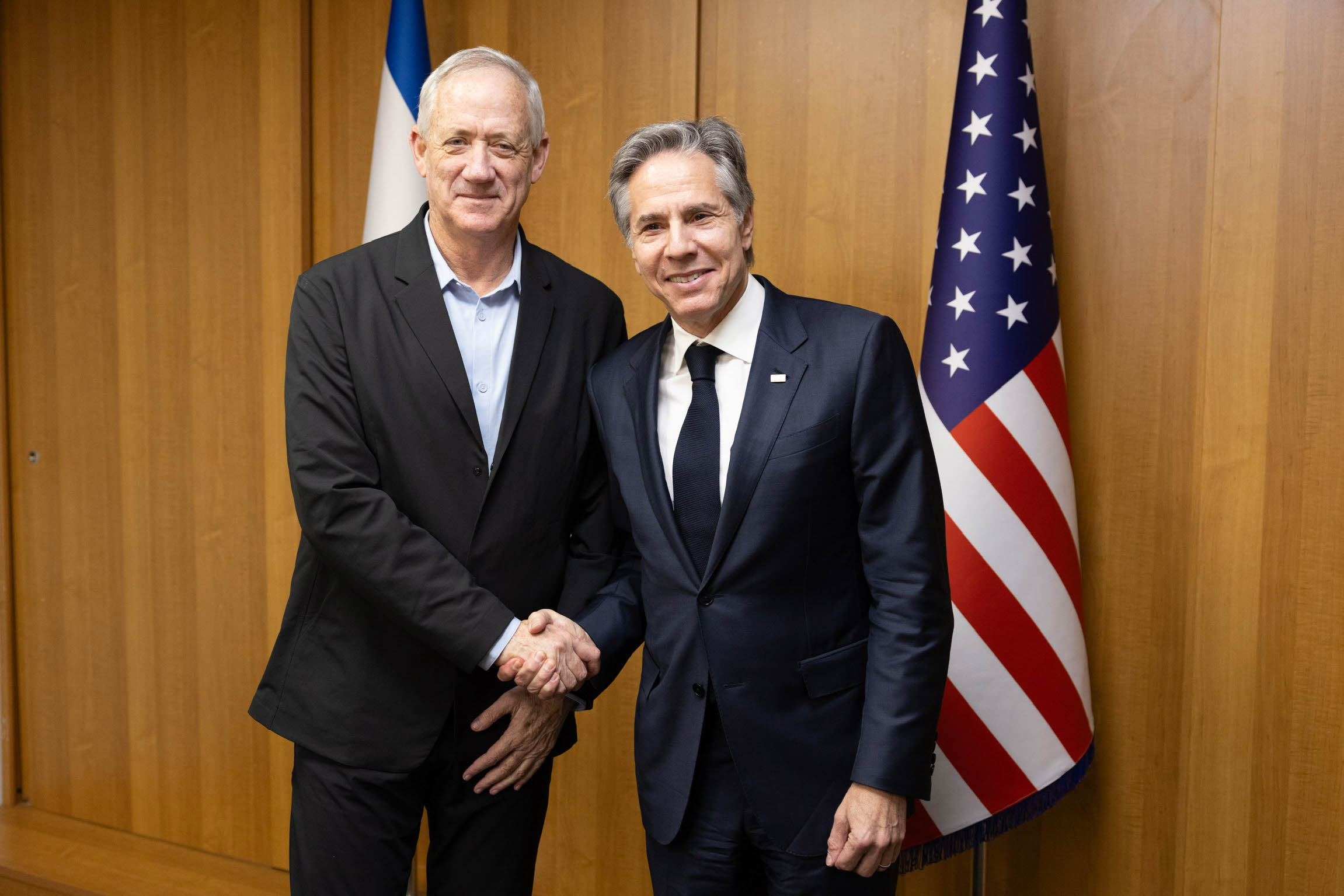
Gantz meeting with US secretary of state Antony Blinken in Israel in January 2024

Following the dissolution of Knesset on 29 June 2022, a legislative election was called for 1 November. On 10 July, Gantz announced an alliance with Gideon Sa'ar's New Hope, which was initially called 'Blue and White-The New Hope'. The alliance was joined by former IDF Chief of Staff Gadi Eizenkot and former Yamina MK Matan Kahana on 14 August, at which point it was renamed the National Unity Party. The alliance won 12 seats in the election. Gantz was replaced as defense minister by Yoav Gallant on 29 December after an alliance of parties led by Netanyahu formed a new government.

=== Gaza war and emergency government ===
On 7 October 2023, the Gaza war began following an attack led by Hamas militants on Israel. The following day, Gantz announced his willingness to temporarily join Netanyahu's government and establish a war cabinet. On 11 October, Gantz and Netanyahu announced that they had reached an agreement on the new cabinet, with Gantz joining the war cabinet and being sworn in as minister without portfolio alongside four other members of his party. The agreement was ratified by the Knesset and went into effect on 12 October.

On 12 March 2024, New Hope withdrew from National Unity, effectively disbanding the alliance. The party subsequently left the emergency government on 25 March. On 18 May, Gantz threatened to resign from the cabinet effective 8 June if it was unable to engage and adopt proposals for returning hostages, ending Hamas' rule, demilitarizing Gaza, establishing an international administration, normalizing relations with Saudi Arabia, and widening military service. He ultimately resigned on 9 June, delaying his announcement by 24 hours due to a successful operation that rescued four Israeli hostages.

In February 2025, he supported US President Donald Trump's Gaza Strip proposal, stating on X that "Israel can only gain from relocating those who wish to leave the devastated coastal enclave."

In October 2025, Ganz supported a bill to annex the Israeli settlement of Ma'ale Adumim in the West Bank.

== Personal life ==
Gantz married Revital, with whom he has four children. In 2019 he was living in Rosh HaAyin.

In February 2019, an Israeli-American woman accused Gantz of exposing himself to her 40 years earlier, causing her traumatic disorders. Gantz denied all allegations, claiming that such an incident never took place, and that the allegations were politically motivated. Gantz has since sued the woman for defamation.

== Gallery ==
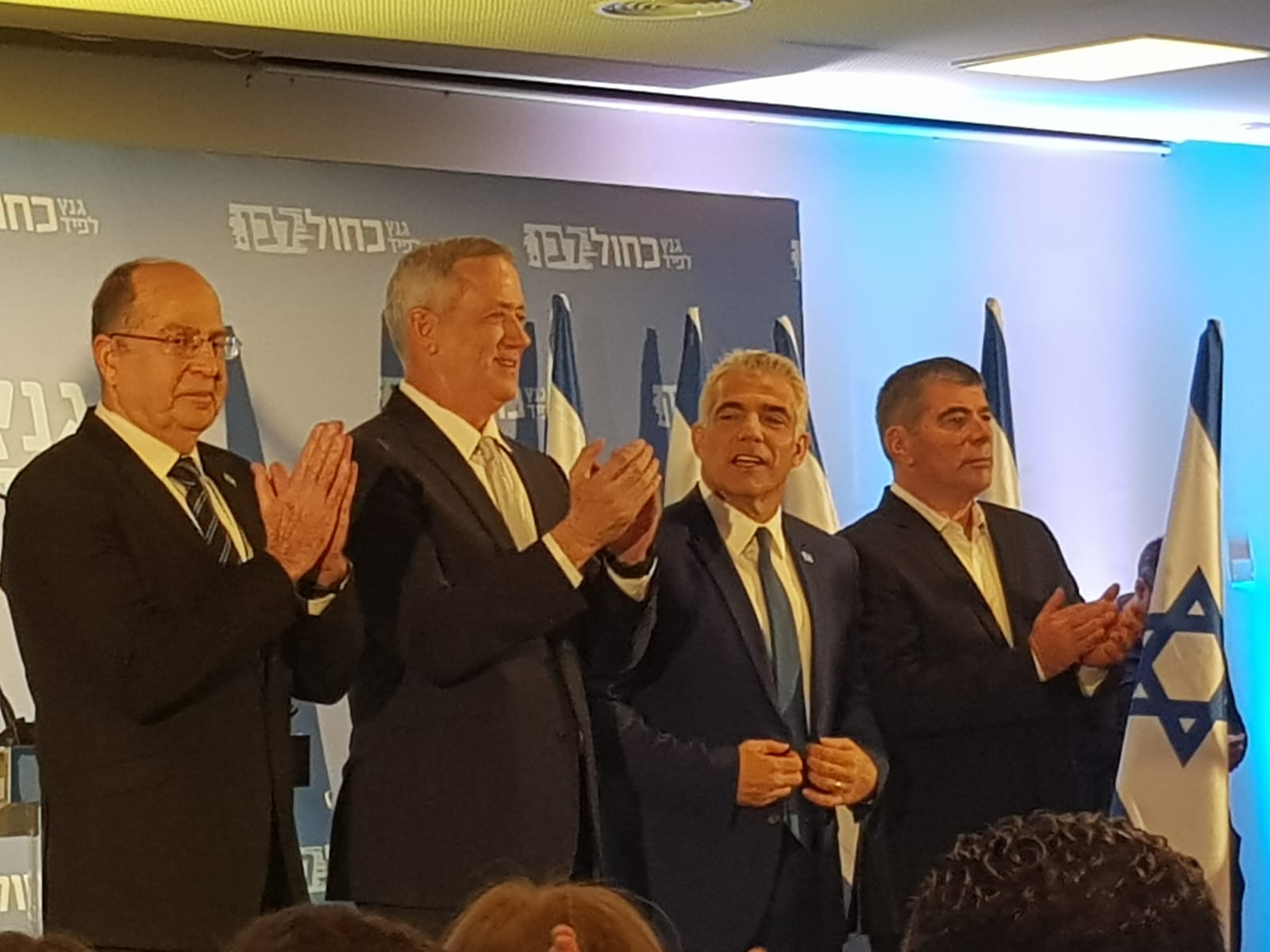
Gantz with fellow Blue and White alliance partners [L to R]: Moshe Yaalon, Gantz, Yair Lapid, and Gabi Ashkenazi.

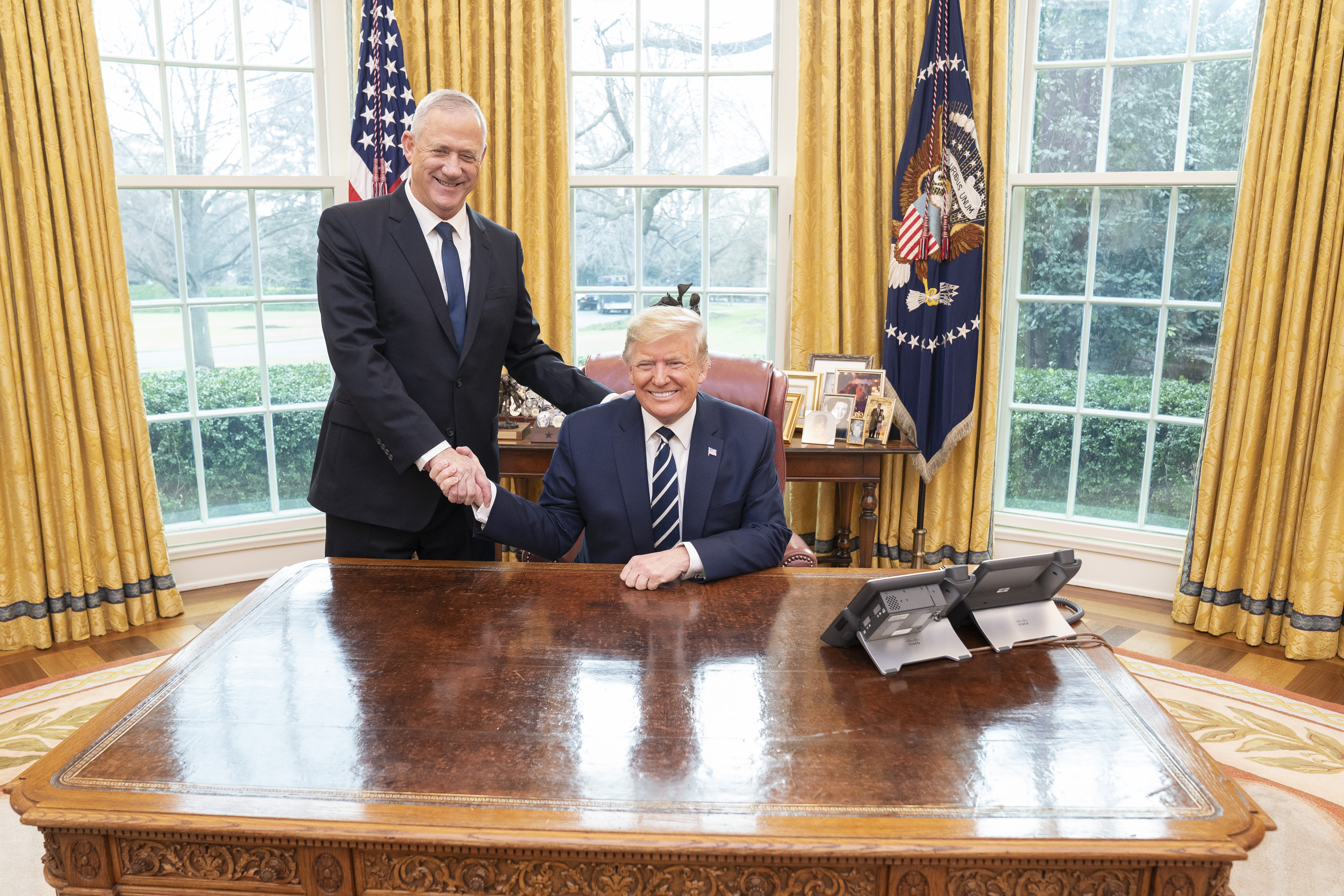
Gantz with United States President Donald Trump in January 2020

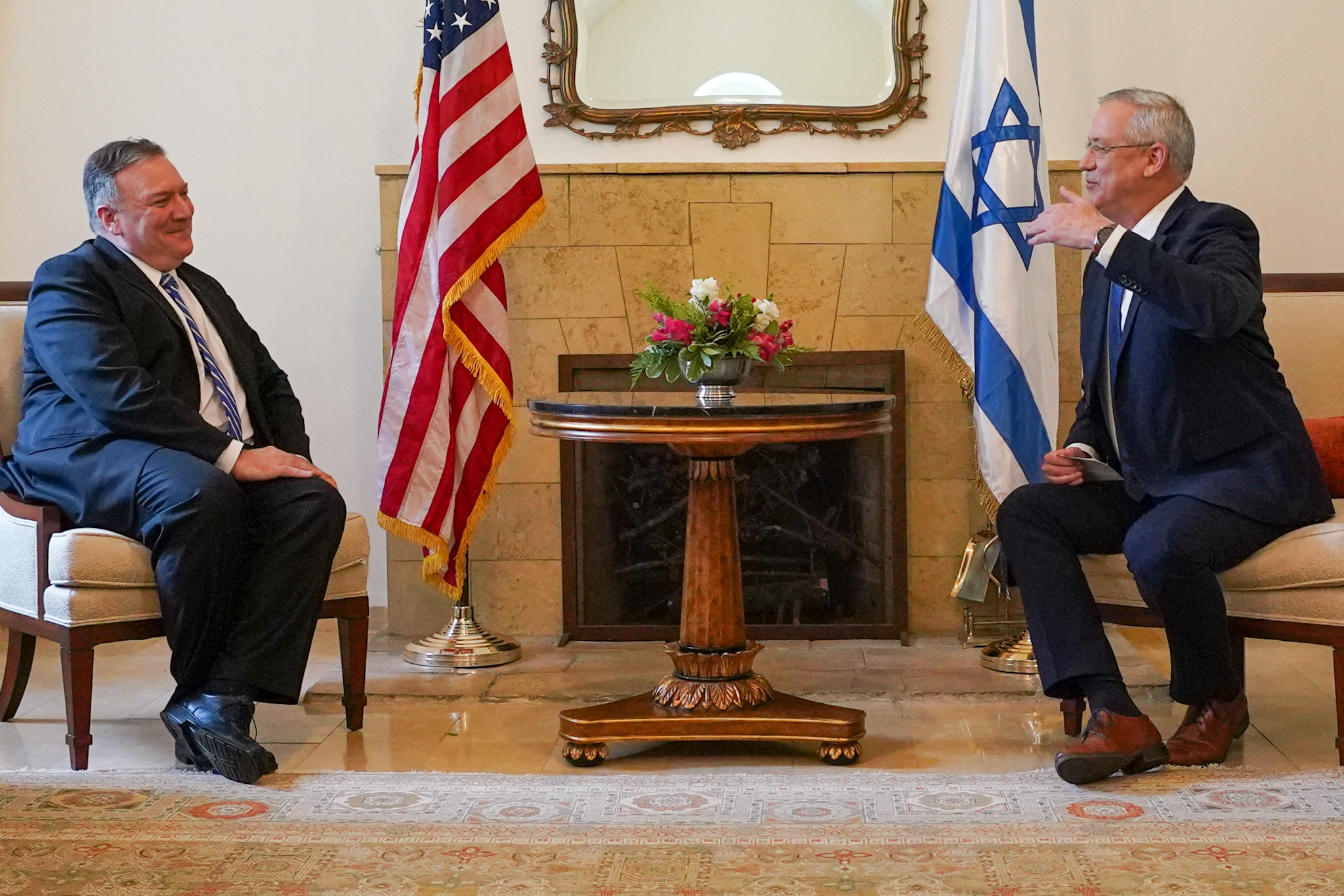
Gantz with United States Secretary of State Mike Pompeo in May 2020

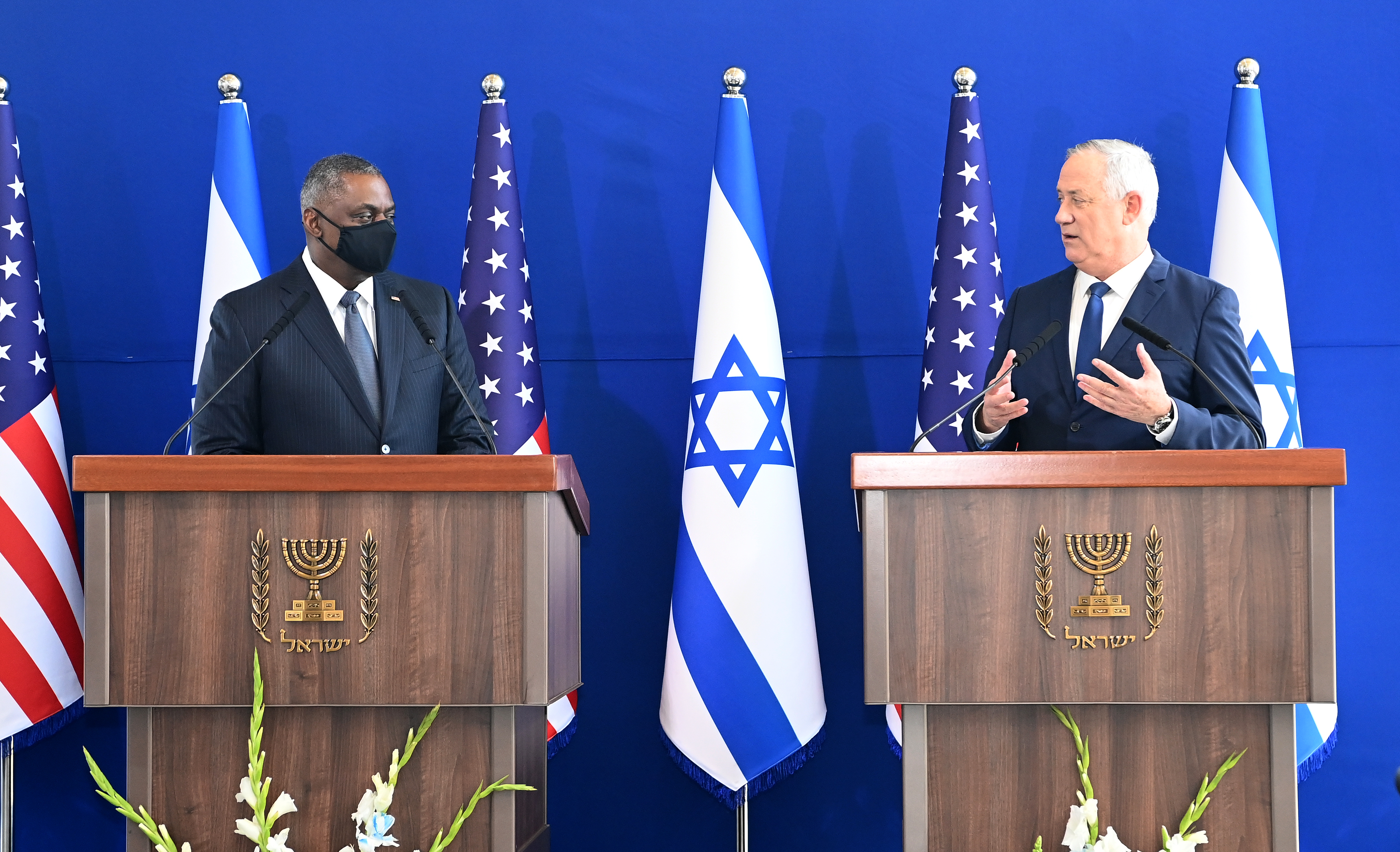
Gantz meeting with Secretary of Defense Lloyd Austin in Israel in April 2021

== Awards and decorations ==

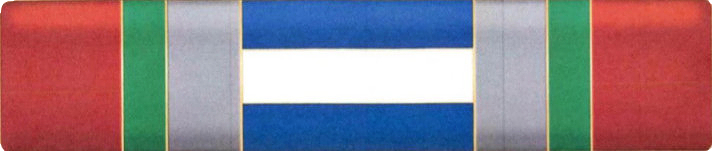

First Lebanon War Ribbon	Second Lebanon War Ribbon	Operation Protective Edge Ribbon	Security Zone in Lebanon Ribbon	Commander of the Legion of Merit
