= Project Fear =

Term used in British politics

"Project Fear" is a term that has entered common usage in British politics in the 21st century, mainly in relation to two major referendum debates: the 2014 Scottish independence referendum, and then again during and after the 2016 United Kingdom European Union membership referendum (Brexit). The phrase has been used to characterise claims of economic and socio-political dangers—primarily those that would result from a change to the existing political status quo—as scaremongering and pessimism.

== 2014 Scottish independence referendum ==
The phrase was coined by Rob Shorthouse, who was the Better Together campaign's director of communications during the 2014 Scottish independence referendum and first appeared in Scotland's Herald newspaper in 2013. It was originally intended as a joke, "an ironic suggestion for Yes Scotland – a handy name it could use in its constant complaints about Better Together's alleged Unionist scaremongering". It was subsequently adopted by Scottish nationalists after Shorthouse used it in conversation with journalists at the Scottish Conservatives party conference in June 2013 and it entered print. Scottish National Party leader Alex Salmond used it to taunt unionist campaigner Alistair Darling during a televised debate.

== 2016 European Union membership referendum ==
It later reappeared during campaigning ahead of the UK referendum on EU membership, being used to criticise the campaign being run by Britain Stronger in Europe, supporters of the UK remaining in the EU. Former mayor of London and key figurehead of the Leave campaign Boris Johnson re-introduced the term. He put forward claims that the pro-EU campaign was guilty of scaremongering, saying that "the agents of Project Fear" were trying to "spook" the British public into voting against British withdrawal from the EU.

The phrase was used by those who were in favour of Britain remaining within the EU. Labour Party Shadow Chancellor John McDonnell said: "The EU referendum is about our future relationship with Europe, not who is the next leader of the Tory Party ... the Labour leadership will not go anywhere near the Tories' 'project fear' campaign on both sides of the debate. But instead we will continue to set out the positive case to 'Remain and Reform' the EU to create 'Another Europe' ... Another Europe is not just possible but urgently and vitally needed, which is why we must reject the offer of a Tory Brexit."

In a speech, Remain campaigner Alistair Darling said: "Project Fear? In fact, it is a reality check. The kind anyone would take before making such an enormous decision in their lives." David Cameron, who resigned as Prime Minister after the referendum result, rejected any allegations of fear-mongering, saying: "The only project I'm interested in is Project Fact. Project Fact is about saying: 'Stay in and you know what you'll get.'" Others, such as London mayor Sadiq Khan, stated that the Leave side had also been scaremongering with false claims of imminent Turkish accession to the EU.

== Wider use ==
In late September 2020, Conservative MP Desmond Swayne used the term "Project Fear" when dismissing a COVID-19 presentation by government scientists Chris Whitty and Patrick Vallance, in which they warned of 50,000 cases per day by mid-October unless urgent action was taken. Swayne called it "an attempt to terrify the British people". (Note: From January 2020 through September 2020, the count was typically below 1,000 cases per day, although in April 2020 it ranged between 3,000 and 4,800 cases per day. Cases per day were rising in late September; on 28 September, there were 8,600 cases. The UK saw 20,000 cases per day in October 2020. The UK had a seven-day average of over 50,000 cases per day in the last week of December 2020, and over 150,000 cases per day by December 2021. See "Cases in England – Coronavirus in the UK". UKHSA data dashboard. GOV.UK. Archived from the original on 25 December 2021.)

In May 2021, Conservative MP Steve Baker described the UK's target for cutting its annual emissions of greenhouse gases to net zero by 2050 as "Project Fear" following his appointment as a trustee of the Global Warming Policy Foundation, a lobby group that opposes climate change legislation. A speech made by Prime Minister Rishi Sunak in May 2024, seen by some commentators as the launch of the Conservative Party's general election campaign, was described as "Project Fear" due to Sunak's implication that an incoming Labour government would be unable to ensure the security of the UK from foreign threats, such as Vladimir Putin.

== See also ==
- Campaigning in the 2016 United Kingdom European Union membership referendum
- Economic effects of Brexit
- Gevald campaign
