= Alon Schuster =

Israeli politician (born 1957)

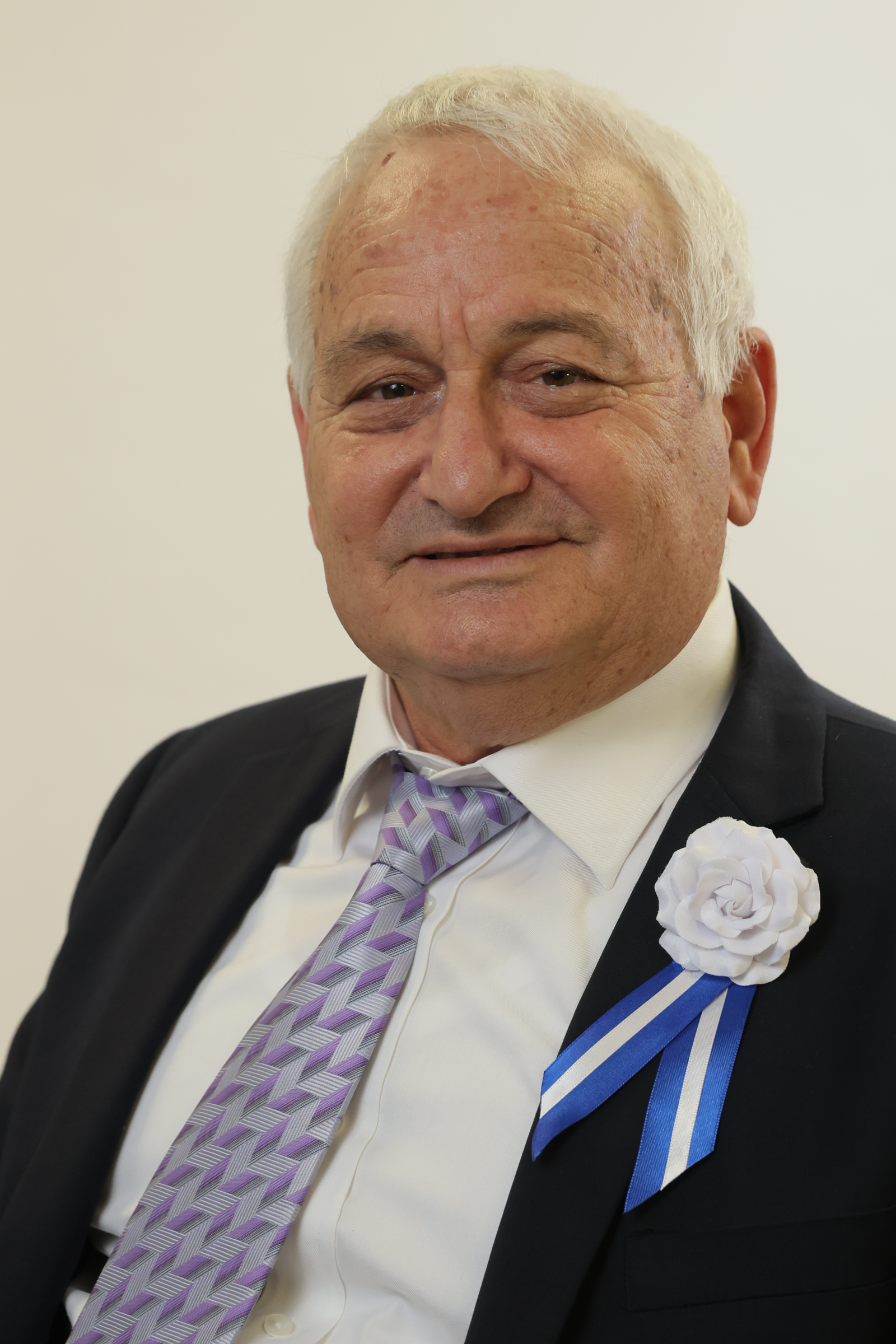
- Schuster in 2021

Ministerial roles
- 2020–2021: Minister of Agriculture

Faction represented in the Knesset
- 2019–2020: Blue and White
- 2021–2022: Blue and White
- 2022–2026: National Unity

Personal details
- Born: 2 March 1957 (age 69) Rehovot, Israel

Alon Natan Schuster (Hebrew: אלון נתן שוסטר; born 2 March 1957) is an Israeli politician who served as a member of the Knesset for National Unity from 2019 to 2026. He was mayor of Sha'ar HaNegev Regional Council between 2002 and 2018, the Minister of Agriculture from 2020 to 2021 and the Deputy Minister of Defense from 2021 to 2022.

== Biography ==
Schuster was born in Rehovot in 1957; his father was from Germany and mother from Argentina. After leaving school he did a Service Year in Sderot before enlisting in the Israel Defense Forces for his national service, joining the Nahal Brigade. He lost the sight in one eye in 1981 after being wounded during preparations for the 1982 Lebanon War. After the war he studied at Ben-Gurion University of the Negev and graduated with a bachelor's degree in computer science and mathematics.

He subsequently worked at the Sha'ar HaNegev Education Centre as a teacher and deputy principal. During the 1990s he served as secretary of Mefalsim. In 1998 he ran for election to become mayor of Sha'ar HaNegev Regional Council, but was beaten by Shai Hermesh. In March 2002 he became Hermesh's deputy, and was elected mayor of the council later in the year after Hermesh became treasurer of the Jewish Agency. As a member of the Labor Party, he was given the 105th slot on the Zionist Union list for the 2015 Knesset elections.

Prior to the April 2019 elections he joined the new Israel Resilience Party. After the party became part of the Blue and White alliance, he was given the twenty-seventh slot on the joint list, and was subsequently elected to the Knesset as the alliance won 35 seats. He was re-elected in September 2019 and 2020. In May 2020 he was appointed Minister of Agriculture in the new government. He subsequently resigned his Knesset seat under the Norwegian Law and was replaced by Michal Cotler-Wunsh. He was re-elected to the Knesset in the March 2021 elections, and again in the November 2022 elections. He currently serves in the Knesset as a Member of National Unity.

Schuster is married to Lizzie and has four children. He is a supporter of Hapoel Tel Aviv.
