= Gevald campaign =

Israeli political term

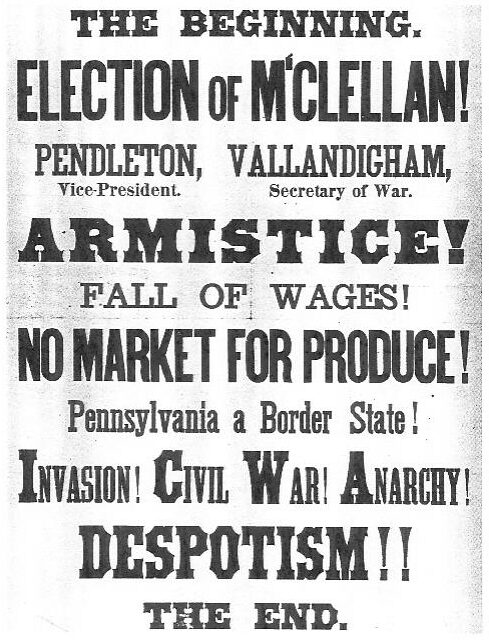
Poster attacking the Democratic Party ticket in the run-up to the 1864 United States presidential election, containing much of the scaremongering tactics typical of Gevald campaigns.

A Gevald campaign (Hebrew: קמפיין געוואלד) is a partisan get out the vote campaign aimed at convincing voters that voting for a certain candidate or party is the only way to avert a certain catastrophe.

The term was coined in 2007 by Israeli pundit Ya'akov Ma'or, in his book "What have we learned from Arthur Finkelstein". It is derived from gevald (געוואַלד), a Yiddish expression of alarm.

== The practice ==
Gevald campaigns are typically a last-minute affair run on or in the lead-up to election day. Tactics used during Gevald campaigns often include spreading messages warning of the catastrophe that would supposedly occur if voters would not vote for the "correct" option. Typically, these messages would paint the picture of an impending economic or socio-political disaster, and include terms with negative connotations such as "danger" and "crisis", meant to increase fear and panic amongst the voters. The purpose of this scaremongering is to "guide" potential voters into believing that voting for an option not supported by the campaign would result in misfortune.

== See also ==
- Get out the vote
- Project Fear
