= Israeli war cabinet =

War cabinet of Israel during part of the Gaza war

- Part of the 37th Cabinet of Israel
- Incumbent
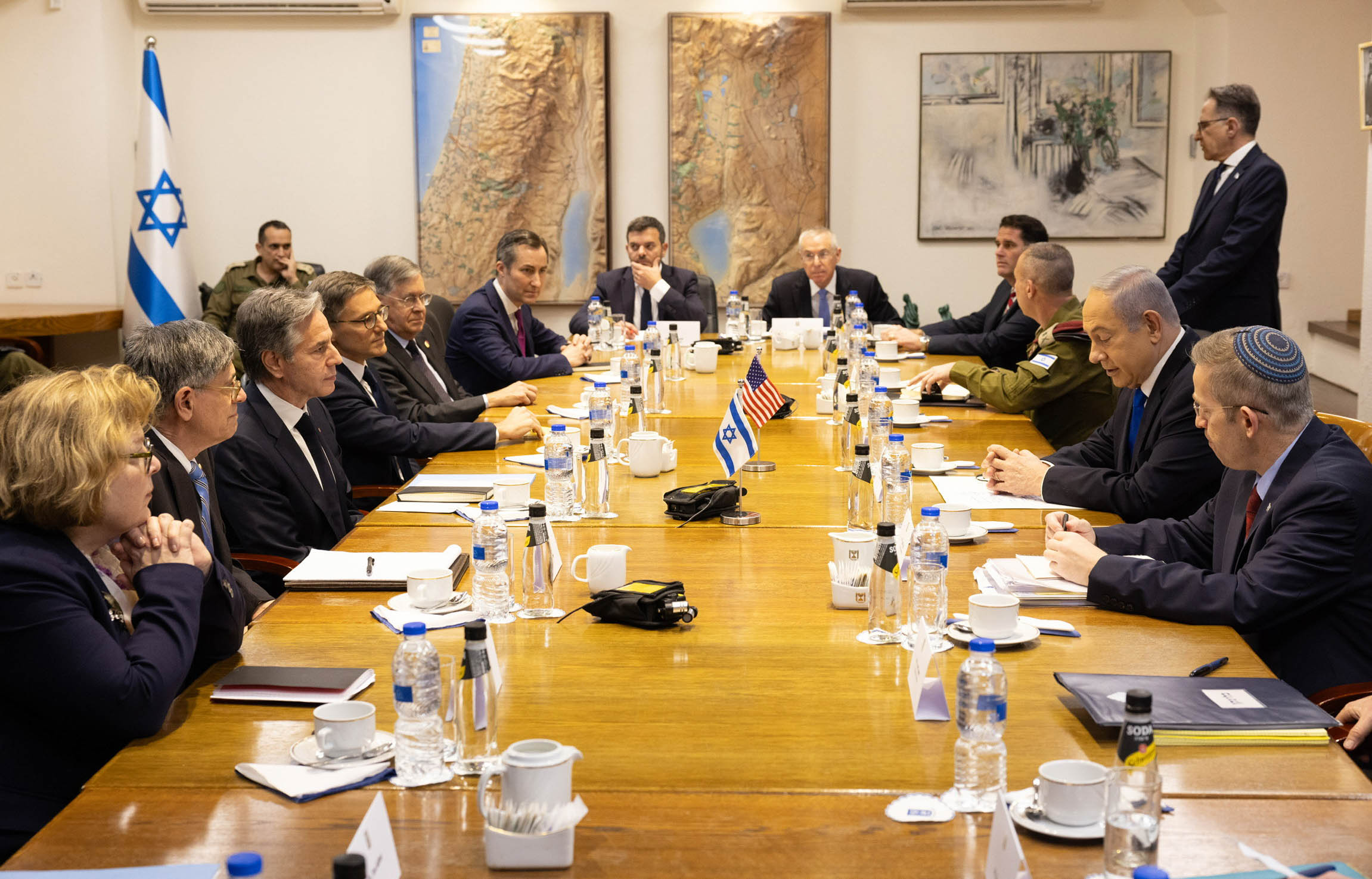
- Ministers of the war cabinet at the meeting with the US Secretary of State Antony Blinken
- Date formed: 11 October 2023
- Date dissolved: 17 June 2024

People and organisations
- President: Isaac Herzog
- Prime minister: Benjamin Netanyahu
- No. of ministers: 6 (incl. observers)
- Member parties: Likud; Shas; National Unity (until 9 June 2024); Supported by other parties of the 37th cabinet
- Status in legislature: Majority (coalition)
- Opposition parties: Yesh Atid; Yisrael Beiteinu; Ra'am; Hadash–Ta'al; Labor; New Hope (since 25 March 2024)
- Opposition leader: Yair Lapid

History
- Incoming formation: Israeli government response to the October 7 attacks
- Election: 2022 Knesset election
- Legislature terms: 25th Knesset

The Israeli war cabinet was formed on 11 October 2023, five days after the beginning of the Gaza war. The opposition party National Unity joined the thirty-seventh government led by Benjamin Netanyahu as prime minister. Negotiations began upon the outbreak of the war.

On 13 June 2024, former Chiefs of the General Staff Benny Gantz and Gadi Eisenkot exited the war cabinet, leaving Netanyahu, Minister of Defense Yoav Gallant, Ron Dermer and Aryeh Deri as its only members. The cabinet was subsequently dissolved on 17 June.

== Background ==
An armed conflict between Israel and Hamas-led Palestinian militant groups (Note: The list of groups included Hamas, Islamic Jihad, Democratic Front for the Liberation of Palestine and the Lions' Den.) has been taking place since 7 October 2023. Part of the broader Gaza–Israel conflict and following an uptick of violence in the Israeli–Palestinian conflict, the war began with a militant incursion into Israel from the Gaza Strip, while the responding Israeli counteroffensive was named "Operation Swords of Iron" by the Israel Defense Forces (IDF).

Hostilities were initiated early in the morning with a rocket barrage of at least 3,000 missiles against Israel and vehicle-transported incursions into its territory. Palestinian militants broke through the Gaza–Israel barrier and forced their way through Gaza border crossings, attacking nearby Israeli communities and military installations. At least 1,200 Israelis were killed, including a massacre at a music festival where at least 260 civilians were killed. Israeli soldiers and civilians, including children and elderly, were taken hostage to the Gaza Strip. Hamas abducted at least 199 people, taking hostage both Israelis and persons of several other nationalities.

The war represents a tipping point in the Israeli–Palestinian conflict and the Gaza–Israel conflict, which followed a violent year that saw increased expansion of Israeli settlements and clashes in Jenin, Al-Aqsa mosque, and Gaza, which killed almost 250 Palestinians and 36 Israelis; (Note: In 2023, before the offensive started, at least 247 Palestinians had been killed by Israeli forces, while 32 Israelis and two foreign nationals had been killed by Palestinians.) Hamas cited these events as justification for the attack and called on Palestinians to join the fight to "expel the occupiers and demolish the walls". In response, Israeli Prime Minister Benjamin Netanyahu declared states of emergency and war, vowing a "mighty vengeance for this dark day".

== Negotiations toward emergency unity government ==
Among opposition parties, Yesh Atid leader and former prime minister Yair Lapid, National Unity chairman Benny Gantz, Yisrael Beiteinu party leader Avigdor Lieberman and Labor Party leader Merav Michaeli issued a joint statement expressing full backing for the IDF and unity with the government, saying: "In times like these, there is no opposition and coalition in Israel."

Netanyahu proposed that Yesh Atid and National Unity enter an emergency unity government with his Likud-led coalition, after Lapid urged Netanyahu put "aside our differences and form an emergency, narrow, professional government". Lapid said that Israel could not effectively manage the war with "the extreme and dysfunctional composition of the current cabinet" and called upon Netanyahu to eject the far-right Religious Zionist Party and Otzma Yehudit parties as a condition for Yesh Atid to join an emergency unity government.

The National Unity party met with Likud on 9 October to discuss a possible unity government, with National Unity likely to join such an arrangement. Likud said the emergency unity government would be similar to the one formed before the Six-Day War in 1967. Levi Eshkol and then-opposition leader Menachem Begin joined hands for the duration of the War in the thirteenth government of Israel.

The National Unity party agreed to join the government on 11 October. Lapid's Yesh Atid party ultimately did not join the war cabinet, with Lapid citing three issues: the inclusion of officials who failed to prevent the Hamas onslaught that precipitated the war, the continued inclusion of "extremists" in the government (a reference to National Security Minister Itamar Ben Gvir and Finance Minister Bezalel Smotrich, who are both on the far-right and sit on the Security Cabinet of Israel), and the simultaneous existence of a War Cabinet and Security Cabinet that Lapid predicted would be unworkable and insufficient. Lapid said he would support the war effort from outside the government.

== Approval by the Knesset and scope of agreement ==
The formation of the war cabinet was approved by the Knesset on 12 October. The composition of the preexisting government was modified: MKs voted, 66–4, to approve the addition of five National Unity ministers (Gantz, Gadi Eisenkot, Gideon Sa'ar, Hili Tropper, and Yifat Shasha-Biton) to the government as ministers without portfolio, and unanimously voted to remove the health portfolio from Interior Minister Moshe Arbel and elevate Uriel Buso of the Shas party to the post of health minister.

As part of the deal, Netanyahu and Gantz also agreed to freeze all new non-war, non-emergency legislation, including the highly controversial judicial overhaul legislation, and agreed that the war cabinet would meet at least once every 48 hours. The war cabinet had the authority to "update, as necessary, military and strategic aims for the conflict" but its decisions were subject to approval from the Security Cabinet of Israel.

On 16 October, Netanyahu's Likud party announced that Yisrael Beiteinu, led by Avigdor Lieberman, had agreed to join the emergency government. However, later the same day, Lieberman denied reaching an agreement with the government, saying that the offer to join the Security Cabinet was insufficient. Lieberman said that he wanted a seat on the smaller war cabinet instead. He said his party would "continue to support the government's actions that are meant to eliminate Hamas and Hamas leaders" but that he had "no intention of being the 38th minister in the government and be used as a fig leaf."

== Members of the war cabinet ==
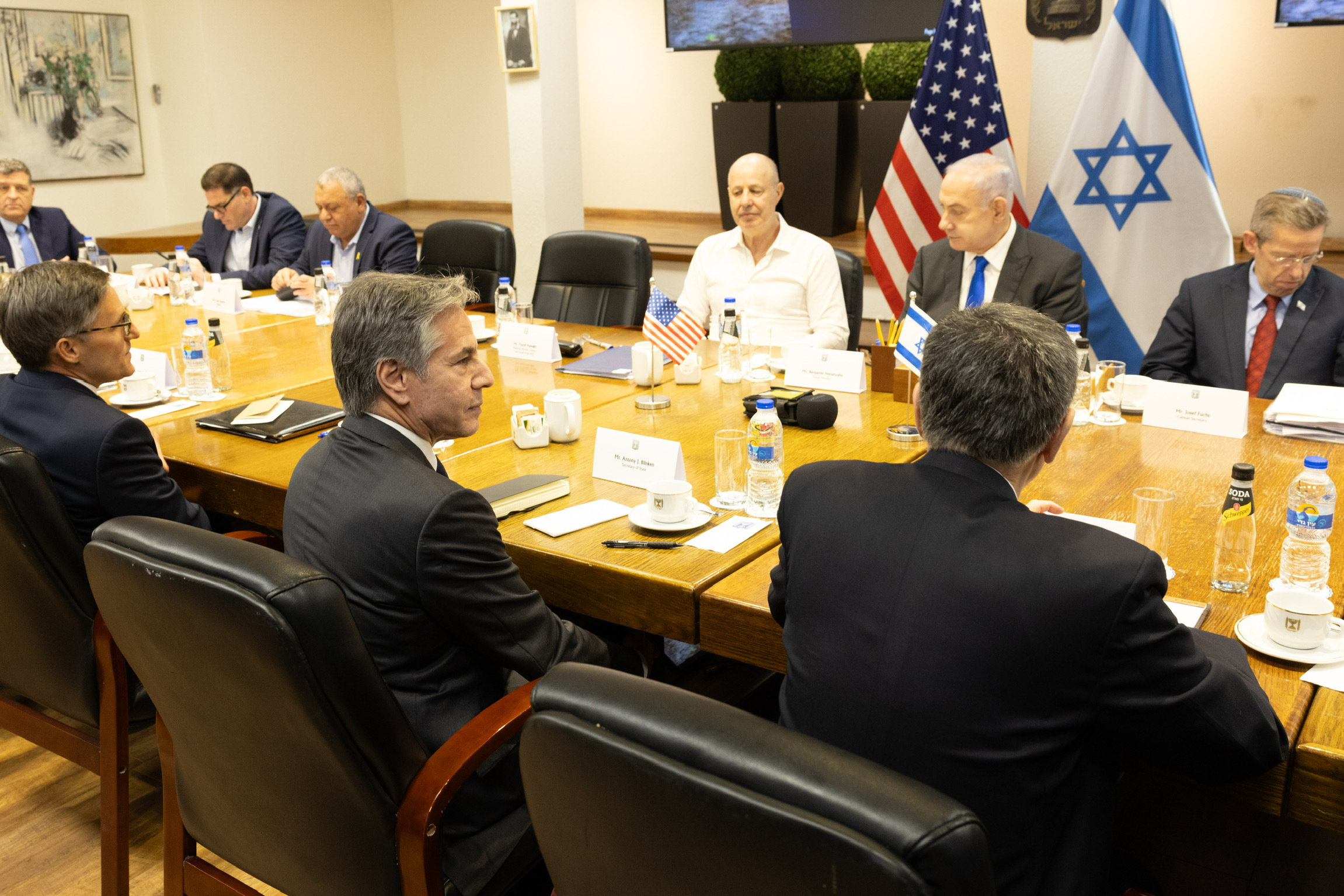
US secretary of state Antony Blinken with Israeli prime minister Benjamin Netanyahu and the Israeli war cabinet in Tel Aviv, Israel, 22 March 2024

In the original configuration, there were three members and two observers with only the members having voting rights, though the size of the war cabinet was reduced to four members in June 2024, until its dissolution later that month.

Dermer and Deri are considered to be "confidants" of Netanyahu.

Portfolio	Minister	Party	Status
Prime Minister	Benjamin Netanyahu	Likud	Chair
Minister of Defense	Yoav Gallant	Likud	Member
Minister without portfolio	Benny Gantz	National Unity	Member
Minister of Strategic Affairs	Ron Dermer	Independent (Note: Dermer is not a member of a political party, but is a close ally of Likud leader Netanyahu.)	Observer; Member
Minister without portfolio	Gadi Eisenkot	National Unity	Observer
Minister without portfolio	Aryeh Deri	Shas	Observer; Member

== Departures and dissolution ==
Sa'ar announced in March that he was leaving the National Unity alliance and called to be appointed to the war cabinet, to which Gantz expressed opposition. In addition, though Netanyahu was "open" to Sa'ar's appointment, Ben-Gvir demanded that he also be appointed. On 25 March 2024, Sa'ar quit the coalition.

On 9 June 2024, Gantz and Eisenkot resigned from the cabinet because Netanyahu did not present a post-war plan for Gaza by the previous day, meeting a previously announced deadline. On 17 June 2024, the dissolution of the war cabinet was announced, which, according to observers, was done in order to quash the demands of Ben-Gvir and Finance Minister Bezalel Smotrich that they be given seats in the cabinet.

== See also ==
- Effects of the Gaza war
