= National Unity (Israel) =

Israeli electoral alliance

National Unity המחנה הממלכתי معسكر الدولة
- Leader: Benny Gantz
- Founders: Benny Gantz; Gideon Sa'ar; Gadi Eisenkot; Matan Kahana
- Founded: 14 August 2022
- Dissolved: 7 July 2025
- Ideology: Zionism
- Political position: Centre to centre-right
- Member parties: Blue & White; New Hope (2022–2024); Independents
- Colours: Blue; White

Election symbol
- כן ك‌ن

Website
- machane.org.il

National Unity or State Camp (Hebrew: המחנה הממלכתי, romanized: HaMahane HaMamlakhti) was an Israeli political alliance initially made up of former IDF Chief of Staff Benny Gantz's Blue and White, Gideon Sa'ar's New Hope, as well as independents Gadi Eisenkot (who formerly served as the IDF Chief of Staff) and Matan Kahana.

The alliance was created to participate in the 2022 Israeli legislative election. It had been part of the Thirty-seventh government of Israel, led by Benjamin Netanyahu, from October 2023 to June 2024. The New Hope party left the alliance in March 2024, while Eisenkot and Kahana left it in July 2025.

== History ==
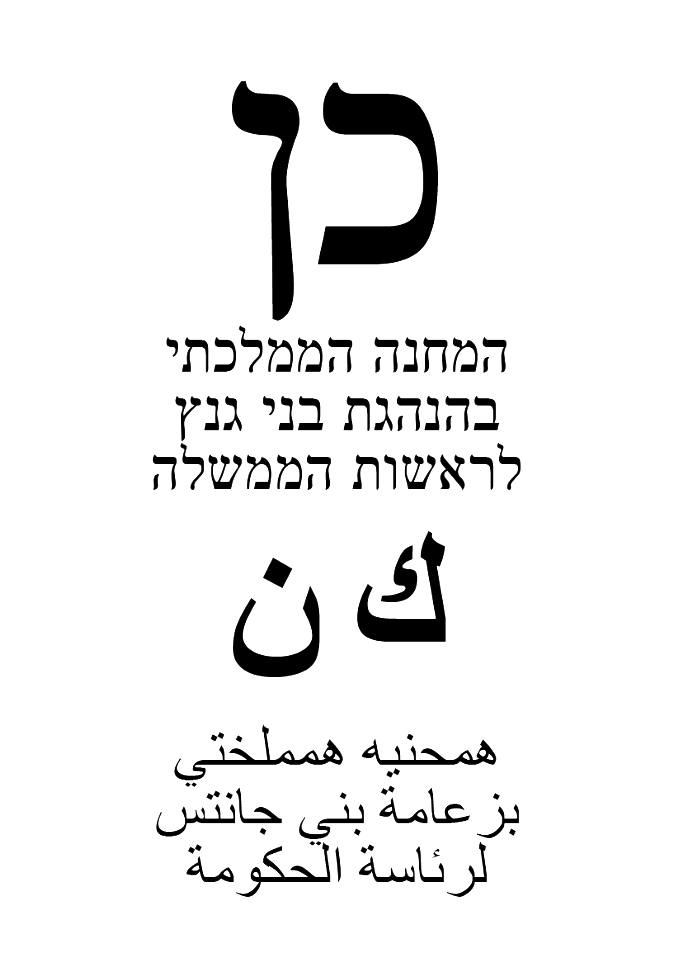
Ballot paper used by the National Unity Party during the 2022 election

Gantz and Sa'ar announced an alliance between their two parties on 10 July 2022 which was initially called Blue and White The New Hope. The alliance was joined by former IDF Chief of Staff Gadi Eisenkot and former Yamina MK Matan Kahana on 14 August, at which point it was renamed the National Unity Party. Yamina MK Shirly Pinto joined the party on 22 August. The alliance won 12 seats in the election.

Five members of the party (Benny Gantz, Gadi Eisenkot, Gideon Sa'ar, Hili Tropper and Yifat Shasha-Biton) joined the Thirty-seventh government of Israel as ministers without portfolio in October 2023, following the outbreak of the Gaza war; Gantz and Eisenkot also joined the Israeli war cabinet. Sa'ar announced on 12 March 2024 that New Hope would leave the National Unity alliance, and again become an independent faction. The split was approved the next day.

On 18 May, Gantz set an 8 June deadline for a "clear plan of action" regarding the war; if not met, his party would leave the coalition. His party also filed a bill on 30 May 2024 to dissolve the Knesset. The scheduled announcement was postponed, after the 2024 Nuseirat rescue operation was made the same day. Gantz announced on 9 June that he had exited the government, with other party members also submitting their resignations the same night.

Following the July 2025 exits of Eisenkot and Kahana from the alliance, it was announced on 2 July 2025 that the name of the party would revert to Blue and White. The name of the Knesset faction was changed to Blue and White-National Unity and was approved by the Knesset House Committee on 7 July 2025.

== Composition ==
Name	Ideology	Position	Leader	25th Knesset
Blue and White	Liberal Zionism	Centre	Benny Gantz	6 / 120
New Hope (2022–2024)	National liberalism Zionism	Centre-right to right-wing	Gideon Sa'ar	4 / 120
Independents			Gadi Eisenkot; Matan Kahana	2 / 120

== Knesset members ==
Knesset term	Seats	Faction	Members
25th (2022–2025)	6	Blue and White	Benny Gantz, Pnina Tamano-Shata, Hili Tropper, Michael Biton, Orit Farkash-Hacohen, Alon Schuster
25th (2022–2025)	4	New Hope	Gideon Sa'ar, Yifat Shasha-Biton, Ze'ev Elkin, Sharren Haskel (Note: Members of New Hope left National Unity in March 2024)
25th (2022–2025)	2	Independents	Gadi Eisenkot, Matan Kahana (Note: After independents Gadi Eisenkot and Matan Kahana resigned from National Unity, Eitan Ginzburg and Yael Ron Ben-Moshe took over their Knesset positions)

== Leaders ==
Leader	Took office	Left office
Benny Gantz	2022	2025

== Knesset election results ==
Election	Leader	Votes	%	Seats	+/–	Status
2022	Benny Gantz	432,376	9.08	12 / 120	New	Opposition (2022–Oct 2023)
2022	Benny Gantz	432,376	9.08	12 / 120	New	Coalition (Oct 2023–June 2024)
2022	Benny Gantz	432,376	9.08	12 / 120	New	Opposition (June 2024–July 2025)
