= Fearmongering =

Deliberate use of fear-based tactics

Fearmongering, or scaremongering, is the act of exploiting feelings of fear by using exaggerated rumors of impending danger, usually for personal gain.

== Theory ==
According to evolutionary anthropology and evolutionary biology, humans have a strong impulse to pay attention to danger because awareness of dangers has been important for survival throughout their evolutionary history. The effect is amplified by cultural evolution when the news media cater to people's appetite for news about dangers.

The attention of citizens is a resource that news media, political campaigners, social reformers, advertisers, civil society organizations, missionaries, and cultural event makers compete over, according to attention economy.

Social agents of all kinds are often using fearmongering as a tactic in the competition for attention, as illustrated by the examples below.

Fearmongering can have strong psychological effects, which may be intended or unintended. One hypothesized effect is mean world syndrome in which people perceive the world as more dangerous than it really is. Fearmongering can make people fear the wrong things, and use too many resources to avoid rare and unlikely dangers while more probable dangers are ignored. For example, some parents have kept their children at home to prevent abduction while they paid less attention to more common dangers such as lifestyle diseases or traffic accidents. Fearmongering can produce a rally around the flag effect by increasing support for the incumbent political leaders. For example, official warnings about the risk of terrorist attacks have led to increased support for the proposed policies of US Presidents.

Collective fear is likely to produce an authoritarian mentality, desire for a strong leader, strict discipline, punitiveness, intolerance, xenophobia, and less democracy, according to regality theory. Historically, the effect has been exploited by political entrepreneurs in many countries for purposes such as increasing support for an authoritarian government, avoiding democratization, or preparing the population for war.

== Examples ==
=== Political campaign advertisements ===
"Daisy" advertisement

Daisy is a famous television commercial that aired in 1964 and was run by Lyndon B. Johnson's presidential campaign. It begins with a little girl standing in a meadow, birds chirping in the background; she picks and clumsily counts the petals off a daisy. When she reaches 'nine', an ominous male voice begins a launch countdown. The girl's gaze turns toward the sky and the camera zooms into her eye until her pupil blackens the screen. As the countdown reaches zero, a nuclear explosion flashes on and morphs into a mushroom cloud. While the firestorm rages, Johnson's voice proclaims, "These are the stakes! To make a world in which all of God's children can live, or to go into the dark. We must either love each other, or we must die." Another voice then says, "Vote for President Johnson on November 3. The stakes are too high for you to stay home."

=== Mass media ===
Fierce economic competition is driving commercial mass media to rely extensively on scary stories and bad news in a competition that has been characterized as an emotional arms race. Stories about crime, and especially violent crimes and crimes against children, figure prominently among newspaper headlines. An analysis of US newspapers has found that between 10 and 30% of headlines involve crime and fear, with a tendency to a shift of focus from isolated crime events to more thematic articles about fear. In the United Kingdom, the news media have routinely used a focus on gory sex crimes as a parameter of competition. The continued focus on emotionally touching sex crimes has had a strong influence on politics and legislation in the country.

=== Product advertisements ===
Advertisers have also entered the arena with their discovery that "fear sells". Ad campaigns based on fear, sometimes referred to as shockvertising, have become increasingly popular in recent years. Fear is a strong emotion and it can be manipulated to persuade people into making emotional rather than reasoned choices. From car commercials that imply that having fewer airbags will cause the audience's family harm, to disinfectant commercials that show pathogenic bacteria lurking on every surface, fear-based advertising works. While using fear in ads has generated some negative reactions by the public, there is evidence to show that "shockvertising" is a highly effective persuasion technique, and over the last several years, advertisers have continued to increase their usage of fear in ads in what has been called a "never-ending arms race in the advertising business".

Author Ken Ring was accused of scaremongering by New Zealand politician Nick Smith. The Auckland seller of almanacs made predictions about earthquakes and weather patterns based on lunar cycles, and some of his predictions were taken seriously by some members of the public in connection with the 2011 earthquakes in Christchurch, New Zealand.

=== Psychological warfare ===
Fearmongering is routinely used in psychological warfare for the purpose of influencing a target population. The tactics often involves defamation of an enemy by means of smear campaigns. False flag attacks have been used as a pretext for starting a war in many cases, including the Gulf of Tonkin incident, the Shelling of Mainila, and Operation Himmler. Terrorism is also a kind of psychological warfare. It is creating violence and terror in order to get media attention or to scare an enemy.

A remarkable tactic is the strategy of tension, which is based on making violence and chaos in order to create political instability, to defame an opponent, to pave the way for a more authoritarianism or fascist government, or to prevent the decolonization of colonies. The strategy of tension is associated in particular with the widespread political violence in the Years of Lead in the 1960s to 1980s in Italy. There were many terrorist attacks in the country in these years, some committed by right-wing and neo-fascist groups, and others by left-wing groups. Some attacks initially attributed to left-wing groups to were suspected or confirmed false flag attacks. The main purpose of the strategy of tension in Italy was to prevent the communists from gaining power and to pave the way for a neofascist government. Historians disagree about who were controlling the strategy of tension, but there is evidence that both national neofascist groups and foreign powers were involved.

== See also ==
- Alarmism
- Appeal to fear
- Culture of fear
- Demagogue
- Emotional blackmail
- Fake news
- False flag
- Fear, uncertainty and doubt (FUD)
- Fnord
- Intimidation
- Missing-children milk carton
- Moral panic
- Project Fear
- Propaganda
- Red Scare
