= Twin films =

Similar films released around the same time

Twin films are films with the same or similar plots produced and released within a proximity of time by two different film studios. The phenomenon can result from two or more production companies investing in similar scripts at the same time, resulting in a race to distribute the films to audiences. Some attribute twin films to industrial espionage, the movement of staff between studios, or that the same screenplays are sent to several film studios before being accepted. Another possible explanation is if the films deal with topical issues, such as volcanic eruptions, reality television, terrorist attacks, or significant anniversaries, resulting in multiple discovery of the concept.

While twin films are often big budget films, a mockbuster can be made with a low budget, with similar titles, aesthetics, or theme as blockbuster films. Mockbusters are usually given more limited release and marketing, intending to take advantage of the public interest in the topic driven by the major film.

== Avoiding twin films ==
Screenwriter Terry Rossio notes that there are always film projects with similar subjects being developed in multiple studios, and that usually only one of them makes it into production in a given period of time, and therefore twin films are better regarded as exceptions to this tendency. For example, the release of the 2015 Whitey Bulger biopic Black Mass led to the abandonment of a planned film about Bulger that would have been produced by Ben Affleck and Matt Damon.

The 2008 film Who Do You Love?, about American record label Chess Records, had its widespread release delayed until 2010 to avoid competing with Cadillac Records, a higher-budget 2008 film on the same subject.

In one case, for the 1974 film The Towering Inferno, the fear of having competing action thrillers, both set in a burning skyscraper, convinced two Hollywood studios to merge their productions into one (all-star) film.

== Notable examples ==
Notable examples of twin films are included in this list:

First film	Release date	Second film	Release date	Similarities
Oliver Twist	1912	Oliver Twist	1912	Based on the Dickens novel
Dr. Jekyll and Mr. Hyde	1920	Dr. Jekyll and Mr. Hyde	1920	Based on The Strange Case of Dr. Jekyll and Mr. Hyde (1886)
Ingagi	1930	Africa Speaks!	1930	Both exploitation films about an expedition in the Belgian Congo.
Dishonored	1931	Mata Hari	1931	Both films are about female spies. MGM studios, alarmed by the competition that the Sternberg-Dietrich phenomena posed to star Greta Garbo, responded with the copycat Mata Hari the same year.
The Black Cat	1934	Maniac	1934	Both are loose adaptations of The Black Cat.
Juarez	1939	The Mad Empress	1939	Two films about the victory of Benito Juárez, the death of emperor Maximilian I and the madness of empress Charlotte.
Young Mr. Lincoln	1939	Abe Lincoln in Illinois	1940	Both are about Abraham Lincoln.
Alice au pays des Merveilles	1949	Alice in Wonderland	1951	Both are feature-length animated adaptations of Lewis Carroll's 1865 novel Alice's Adventures in Wonderland. The Walt Disney Company would sue the French film's distributors to prevent release of the British version in the U.S., and the case was extensively covered in Time magazine. The company that released the British version accused Disney of trying to exploit their film by releasing its version at virtually the same time.
Sign of the Pagan	1954	Attila	1954	Both films about Attila and his invasion of the Western Roman Empire; a contemporary review in The New York Times writes, "Attila the Hun, quite ignored by moviemakers up to now, is about to step into the limelight in two new films."
Oscar Wilde	1960	The Trials of Oscar Wilde	1960	Both films are based on the libel and subsequent criminal cases involving Oscar Wilde and the Marquess of Queensberry.
Those Magnificent Men in Their Flying Machines	1965	The Great Race	1965	Both are slapstick films about a race in the early 1900s, inspired by the success of It's a Mad, Mad, Mad, Mad World (1963). The films were released two weeks apart.
Harlow	1965	Harlow	1965	Both are films about the career of actress Jean Harlow, from her discovery as a struggling actress to her death at age 26.
You're a Big Boy Now	1966	The Graduate	1967	Also Benjamin (1968). All are coming-of-age comedy-drama films about a young man being pursued by an older woman.
Yours, Mine and Ours	1968	With Six You Get Eggroll	1968	Both are comedy-dramas about a widow with children marrying a widower with children, forming a "blended" family, with chaotic but eventually happy results.
Leo the Last	1970	The Landlord	1970	Both deal with issues of class and race and feature an upper-class man who moves into a lower-class black neighborhood and gets involved with the residents.
The Strawberry Statement	1970	Getting Straight	1970	Also The Revolutionary and R. P. M. (1970). All are dramas about campus revolt.
Bloody Mama	1970	The Grissom Gang	1971	Both based on the life story of Ma Barker.
Godspell	1973	Jesus Christ Superstar	1973	Both adaptations of 1971 Broadway musicals based on the life of Jesus Christ.
The Killing of Angel Street	1981	Heatwave	1982	Both were loosely based on the disappearance of Australian anti-development activist Juanita Nielsen.
Wild Style	1983	Beat Street	1984	Both are well-received old-school hip hop films, focusing on all four pillars of hip hop culture.
Platoon	1986	Full Metal Jacket	1987	Also Hamburger Hill (1987). All are dramatic war films about the Vietnam War.
Gothic	1986	Haunted Summer	1988	Also Rowing with the Wind (1988). All depict the summer in 1816 that Percy Shelley, Mary Shelley, and John William Polidori spent with Lord Byron at his villa, and their private contest to produce the best horror story, which led to Mary Shelley writing Frankenstein.
Like Father Like Son	1987	Vice Versa	1988	Both are fantasy-comedies about a father and son who magically switch bodies. Also 18 Again! (1988), about a grandfather and grandson who magically switch bodies.
Betrayed	1988	Talk Radio	1988	Both are roughly based upon the terrorist activities of The Order and the murder of a Jewish radio host, Alan Berg.
Dangerous Liaisons	1988	Valmont	1989	Both are adapations of Les Liaisons dangereuses, the 1782 novel by Pierre Choderlos de Laclos.
K-9	1989	Turner & Hooch	1989	Both are buddy cop-dog films about a police officer who gets a dog for a partner.
DeepStar Six	1989	Leviathan	1989	Also Lords of the Deep (1989), The Abyss (1989) and The Rift (1990). All are underwater monster movies where a deep sea crew is confronted with an unusual life form.
Goldeneye: The Secret Life of Ian Fleming	1989	Spymaker: The Secret Life of Ian Fleming	1990	Both are biopics of James Bond creator Ian Fleming.
Lambada	1990	The Forbidden Dance	1990	Both are Dirty Dancing knock-offs produced on a small budget to cash in on the popularity of the song of the same name.
Robin Hood	1991	Robin Hood: Prince of Thieves	1991	Both are films about Robin Hood.
1492: Conquest of Paradise	1992	Christopher Columbus: The Discovery	1992	Both films deal with Columbus' discovery of the New World. These films were released to commemorate the 500th anniversary of this discovery. A comedic version of the discovery was also released in 1992 with Carry on Columbus, while an animated musical version was released in 1992 under the title The Magic Voyage.
American Me	1992	Blood In Blood Out	1993	Both films depict gang violence in the Mexican-American community in California. At one point, American Me star and director Edward James Olmos was offered to star in and direct Blood In Blood Out, but passed on the film due to creative differences. Floyd Mutrux is credited as a co-writer on both films.
Carnosaur	1993	Jurassic Park	1993	Both are action adventure films involving the genetic recreation of dinosaurs or prehistoric animals. Both are also based on books.
Kalifornia	1993	Natural Born Killers	1994	Also 1993 mini-series Murder in the Heartland. All are road movies about a couple engaging in multi-state killing sprees and all directly or loosely based on real murderer Charles Starkweather. Both films have Juliette Lewis as a main character.
The Beverly Hillbillies	1993	Addams Family Values	1993	Both films are adaptations of 1960s American television sitcoms, centering on eccentric families struggling to fit into conventional society while humorously exposing its flaws. The Beverly Hillbillies follows a rural family that strikes oil and moves to Beverly Hills, where their simple ways clash with high society. Addams Family Values continues the story of the macabre Addams clan, who face suburban norms head-on, especially through Wednesday’s rebellious antics at summer camp. Both films feature a subplot where a naïve, wealthy bachelor—Jed Clampett and Uncle Fester—is targeted by a scheming woman after his fortune.
Tombstone	1993	Wyatt Earp	1994	Both are based on the life of Wyatt Earp.
Gordy	1994	Babe	1995	Both are family films starring piglets.
The Adventures of Priscilla, Queen of the Desert	1994	To Wong Foo, Thanks for Everything! Julie Newmar	1995	Both films follow drag performers on a cross-country road trip, winning over the locals of the small towns they pass through along the way.
Braveheart	1995	Rob Roy	1995	Also The Bruce (1996); all are adventure/war biopics set in Scotland.
Titanic	1996	Titanic	1997	Both the 1996 miniseries and the 1997 film depict the sinking of the RMS Titanic.
Dante's Peak	1997	Volcano	1997	Also Volcano: Fire on the Mountain (1997). All three are disaster films centered around volcanic eruptions.
The House of Yes	1997	The Ice Storm	1997	Also The Myth of Fingerprints. All three independent movies revolve around dysfunctional New England families celebrating Thanksgiving.
Prefontaine	1997	Without Limits	1998	Both are biographical sports films about long-distance runner Steve Prefontaine.
Kundun	1997	Seven Years in Tibet	1997	Both are fact-based dramas set in mid-20th century Tibet, with the 14th Dalai Lama as a main character.
Murder at 1600	1997	Absolute Power	1997	Both films center around a Washington, D.C. murder investigation involving the President/at the White House.
The Curve	1998	Dead Man on Campus	1998	Both are based on the same central college urban legend, known as "pass by catastrophe," which claims that a student gets straight A's if their roommate dies by suicide.
Antz	1998	A Bug's Life	1998	Both are computer-animated films about insects, starring a non-conformist ant who falls in love with an ant princess, leaves the mound, and eventually returns and is hailed as a hero.
Deep Impact	1998	Armageddon	1998	Also Doomsday Rock (1997), Asteroid (1997), Tycus (1998), and Judgment Day (1999). All are global catastrophic risk disaster films centered around an impending impact event that threatens to end most or all life on Earth.
Saving Private Ryan	1998	The Thin Red Line	1998	Also Life Is Beautiful (1997). All are dramas about World War II.
Simon Birch	1998	The Mighty	1998	Both films are about a child with Morquio syndrome.
Sliding Doors	1998	Run Lola Run	1998	Both films tell the same story of a woman multiple times, changing a minor detail at the beginning and depicting how that change drastically affects the outcome.
54	1998	The Last Days of Disco	1998	Both films are set against the backdrop of the waning disco era of the late 1970s and early 1980s.
The Truman Show	1998	EDtv	1999	Also Pleasantville (1998). All are films in which a person or a large group of people's lives are broadcast on TV.
The Matrix	1999	The Thirteenth Floor	1999	Also eXistenZ (1999) and Dark City (1998); all are science fiction films involving a false reality, and the theme of whether the world is real or an illusion.
Anywhere but Here	1999	Tumbleweeds	1999	Both films concern a mother-daughter pair who drive across the country to settle in California.
Entrapment	1999	The Thomas Crown Affair	1999	Both are caper films focused on the relationship between an attractive female insurance investigator and a male thief who steals an expensive painting by a famous artist. The male leads in both films had previously played James Bond.
End of Days	1999	Stigmata	1999	Also Lost Souls (2000); all are supernatural religious horror films involving the Catholic Church. Both End of Days and Stigmata star Gabriel Byrne as a main character. Both End of Days and Lost Souls involve the theme of Satan taking possession of a man's body.
10 Things I Hate About You	1999	Hamlet	2000	Also O (2001); All are modern-day adaptations of William Shakespeare plays, featuring Julia Stiles as the female lead.
Scary Movie	2000	Shriek If You Know What I Did Last Friday the Thirteenth	2000	Both are horror movie spoofs featuring a killer wearing a Ghostface mask; Scary Movie additionally had the working title Scream If You Know What I Did Last Halloween.
Padre Pio: Miracle Man	2000	Padre Pio: Between Heaven and Earth	2000	Both are Italian television films about Padre Pio, made in response to his beatification in 1999.
Mission to Mars	2000	Red Planet	2000	Also Blood Red Planet (2000) and Ghosts of Mars (2001). All are science fiction adventure films about expeditions to Mars. Ghosts of Mars is a horror film.
Wonder Boys	2000	Finding Forrester	2000	Both are films involving a writer and his friendship with a student.
Sade	2000	Quills	2000	Both are biographical films about the Marquis de Sade.
Bring It On	2000	Sugar & Spice	2001	Both films are comedies about high school cheerleading squads. Sugar & Spice star Marley Shelton was the second choice to play Bring It On character Torrance Shipman, prior to Kirsten Dunst being cast in the role, after previously turning it down. Also, according to Bring It On star Gabrielle Union, she and many of her Bring It On co-stars also auditioned for Sugar & Spice.
The Score	2001	Heist	2001	Both are crime thriller films involving a major robbery.
God Is Brazilian	2003	Bruce Almighty	2003	Both are comedies that explore man's relationship with God, in which the Creator chooses a human to replace him or receive his powers.
Finding Nemo	2003	Shark Tale	2004	Both are major-studio animated comedy-drama films about the adventures of an anthropomorphic fish and other denizens of the deep.
Chasing Liberty	2004	First Daughter	2004	Both are comedic romances about the college age daughter of the President of the United States resenting the presence of Secret Service agents and seeking independence in a life away from the White House. Her father assigns an undercover agent to accompany her and they fall in love, but their romance is in peril when she learns his true identity.
Red Eye	2005	Flightplan	2005	Both are thriller films set on airplanes.
Madagascar	2005	The Wild	2006	Both are animated comedy-dramas about animals that escape from the Central Park Zoo to live in the jungle.
Capote	2005	Infamous	2006	Both are drama films about Truman Capote and the writing of In Cold Blood. The confluence of the two films led to an incident in 2003 when Infamous writer-director Douglas McGrath called producer Bingham Ray to announce that his script had been finished, and Ray responded "I know, I've got it on my desk!" before realizing that he actually had the screenplay to Capote.
Zzyzx	2006	Zyzzyx Road	2006	Both are thrillers about people trying to hide a dead body on Zzyzx Road in California.
United 93	2006	Flight 93	2006	Both are dramas about United Airlines Flight 93.
The Prestige	2006	The Illusionist	2006	Both are period films about 19th-century stage-magicians.
Happy Feet	2006	Surf's Up	2007	Both are computer-animated comedy films about penguins.
This Christmas	2007	Nothing Like the Holidays	2008	Both holiday comedies, set in Chicago, revolve around extended families celebrate the Christmas holiday season
Eagle Eye	2008	Echelon Conspiracy	2009	Both center around a government AI supercomputer that is tasked with protecting the US through ubiquitous surveillance and endless access to nearly all technology, which becomes too autonomous and powerful.
Observe and Report	2009	Paul Blart: Mall Cop	2009	Both are comedy films about an overweight mall cop.
Gamer	2009	Surrogates	2009	Also Avatar (2009); Science fiction films in which people control physical remotely-operated bodies.
Dear John	2010	Letters to Juliet	2010	Both are romantic films that star Amanda Seyfried as the protagonist and involve the writing of letters.
Kick-Ass	2010	Super	2010	Both are superhero movies in which ordinary male protagonists become real-life superheros in their cities, assisted by a younger female character.
Despicable Me	2010	Megamind	2010	Both are computer-animated films featuring a stereotypical villain as the protagonist who have side character (or characters) called Minion. Both antagonists are also nerds in orange.
Skyline	2010	Battle: Los Angeles	2011	Both are alien invasion movies that primarily take place in Los Angeles. Sony Pictures, the studio of Battle, initiated legal action against the directors and special effects gurus of Skyline for allegedly ripping off ideas and equipment for their similar film. Sony later dismissed their arbitration, stating they were satisfied their own special effects were not used in Skyline.
No Strings Attached	2011	Friends with Benefits	2011	Both are romantic comedies about a pair of friends who have a casual, non-romantic sexual relationship and eventually fall in love. No Strings Attached had the working title Friends with Benefits, but had to be renamed due to a conflict with the other film. The female leads of both films had starred together in Black Swan in 2010.
Yann Samuell's War of the Buttons	2011	Christophe Barratier's War of the Buttons	2011	Both are French film adaptations of the 1912 novel War of the Buttons, released a week apart from one another, though the first was set in the Algerian War while the second was set in World War II.
The Raid	2011	Dredd	2012	Both films deal with a law enforcement officer infiltrating a tall residential building in pursuit of a crime lord, wherein the crime lord attempts to turn the residents against the officer.
Extraterrestrial	2011	Seeking a Friend for the End of the World	2012	Also 4:44 Last Day on Earth (2011) and Melancholia (2011). All are apocalyptic science fiction films.
Mirror Mirror	2012	Snow White and the Huntsman	2012	Both are adaptations of the 1812 fairy tale "Snow White" by the Brothers Grimm.
Quartet	2012	A Late Quartet	2012	Both are about the members of a classical music quartet facing old age.
Upside Down	2012	Patema Inverted	2013	Both are a romance between characters of twin worlds, each with gravity opposite to the other.
The Other Son	2012	Like Father, Like Son	2013	Both films revolve around two young men who were switched at birth and raised by families from contrasting socioeconomic strata.
A Hijacking	2012	Captain Phillips	2013	Both are about a pirate attack on a cargo ship off the coast of Somalia.
Jobs	2013	Steve Jobs	2015	Both are Steve Jobs biopics.
Olympus Has Fallen	2013	White House Down	2013	Both are action films about terrorist attacks on the White House.
Oblivion	2013	After Earth	2013	Both films include a protagonist who must fight for survival on a post-apocalyptic Earth.
This Is the End	2013	The World's End	2013	Also Rapture-Palooza (2013); all are apocalyptic comedy films. Both This Is the End and Rapture-Palooza star Craig Robinson as a main character.
The Double	2013	Enemy	2013	Both are about a man who finds his physical doppelgänger in a seemingly totalitarian state.
Yves Saint Laurent	2014	Saint Laurent	2014	Both are Yves Saint Laurent biopics.
The Equalizer	2014	John Wick	2014	Both films involve a highly trained protagonist who seeks vengeance through killing.
Life After Beth	2014	Burying the Ex	2014	Also Warm Bodies (2013). All three are romantic comedies involving zombies.
Moonwalkers	2015	Operation Avalanche	2016	Both are films based on Moon landing conspiracy theories.
The Beauty Inside	2015	Every Day	2018	Both are a romance between a woman and a spirit who wakes up every day in a different body.
Marguerite	2015	Florence Foster Jenkins	2016	Both films are based on the life of Florence Foster Jenkins.
The Martian	2015	Approaching the Unknown	2016	Also Forsaken (2018). Both are about a man who is stranded in space on a mission to Mars and has to figure out a way to survive.
Spectre	2015	Mission: Impossible – Rogue Nation	2015	Both films feature the protagonists chasing after secret criminal organisations through Austria, Morocco and London while their intelligence agencies are shutting down. Paramount had to advance the release date of Mission: Impossible – Rogue Nation to avoid conflicting with Spectre.
Other People	2016	The Hollars	2016	Both are about a male writer living in New York City who returns to his hometown for his mother dying of cancer.
Christine	2016	Kate Plays Christine	2016	Both are films about Christine Chubbuck, though Kate Plays Christine is a documentary about the acting process.
Batman v Superman: Dawn of Justice	2016	Captain America: Civil War	2016	Both films feature a conflict between two superheroes who are manipulated by a villain into fighting each other, while they face increased government scrutiny in response to excessive collateral damage from a battle in a previous film. Both films also debut a superhero who is a royal from a hidden, isolationist society (Wonder Woman and Black Panther, respectively).
Captain Fantastic	2016	The Glass Castle	2017	Both are about a large family who lives secluded from the civilized world and deal with its moral ramifications.
Anthropoid	2016	The Man with the Iron Heart	2017	Both films are about Operation Anthropoid, the assassination of SS-Obergruppenführer Reinhard Heydrich.
Storks	2016	The Boss Baby	2017	Both are family animated films that center around a company where babies are produced, then delivered to families on Earth.
Patriots Day	2016	Stronger	2017	Both films revolve around the 2013 Boston Marathon bombings and their aftermath.
The Jungle Book	2016	Mowgli: Legend of the Jungle	2018	Both are live-action, CGI-heavy adaptations of Rudyard Kipling's The Jungle Book, though the 2016 film is a remake of the 1967 animated musical film.
Crowhurst	2017	The Mercy	2018	Both films are about Donald Crowhurst's ill-fated entry in the Sunday Times Golden Globe Race, a non-stop round-the-world sailing competition. Uniquely, these films not only have an identical subject, but were also distributed by the same studio, namely StudioCanal: according to the head of StudioCanal UK, Danny Perkins, the company bought the low-budget production Crowhurst "so we could control it".
Goodbye Christopher Robin	2017	Christopher Robin	2018	Goodbye Christopher Robin is a biopic about Winnie the Pooh creator A. A. Milne and his son Christopher Robin Milne. Christopher Robin is about the fictional Winnie the Pooh character Christopher Robin (who the elder Milne modeled on his son) reuniting with Pooh and his friends as an adult.
Sink or Swim	2018	Swimming with Men	2018	Both are about a man who is facing a midlife crisis and joins an all-male synchronised swimming team.
Puppet Master: The Littlest Reich	2018	The Happytime Murders	2018	Both are dark comedies featuring puppets.
Beautiful Boy	2018	Ben Is Back	2018	Both are melodramas about a family with a teenage son facing a drug addiction.
Skate Kitchen	2018	Mid90s	2018	Both are coming of age stories about a group of skateboarding teenagers played by inexperienced actors who skateboard in real life. In both films, the primary character is the newest member of the group and has a contentious relationship with their single mother.
Widows	2018	The Kitchen	2019	Both are about the law-abiding wives of criminals who take up their husbands' criminal plans when they are gone.
Bohemian Rhapsody	2018	Rocketman	2019	Both films are musical biopics about an iconic queer male British singer in the 1970s (Freddie Mercury and Elton John, respectively). Both films are titled after a hit song of the respective artist. Rocketman director Dexter Fletcher also did uncredited directorial work on Bohemian Rhapsody after the original director Bryan Singer was fired from the production.
Hurricane	2018	303 Squadron	2018	Both films are based on the history of the No. 303 Squadron of the Royal Air Force, active in the Battle of Britain during the World War II.
Fyre Fraud	2019	Fyre	2019	Both are documentaries about the Fyre Festival.
The Haunting of Sharon Tate	2019	Once Upon a Time in Hollywood	2019	Both are films about Sharon Tate and her murder. Although the former is a horror thriller film that dramatizes the events, the latter takes place in an alternate universe where the murder did not take place.
The King's Letters	2019	Forbidden Dream	2019	Both are about King Sejong the Great and his patronage of scholarship.
Ujda Chaman	2019	Bala	2019	Both movies are about men facing premature baldness, hence becoming a subject of social ridicule and facing problems finding a spouse.
The Curse of La Llorona	2019	La Llorona	2019	Both films are about the legend of La Llorona.
Peninsula	2020	Army of the Dead	2021	Both are zombie films in which the protagonists are recruited to enter the quarantined zombie area to retrieve a large amount of money.
Killer Spider	2020	Holy Spider	2022	Both are dramatizations of the case of Saeed Hanaei, a serial killer who targeted sex workers in Iran.
Pinocchio	2022	Guillermo del Toro's Pinocchio	2022	Also Pinocchio: A True Story (2022) and Pinocchio and the Water of Life (2023). All films are based on The Adventures of Pinocchio. Three of the films—Guillermo del Toro's Pinocchio, Pinocchio: A True Story, and Pinocchio and the Water of Life—star Tom Kenny.
Violent Night	2022	The Mean One	2022	Also Christmas Bloody Christmas (2022). All are films about a murderous Santa Claus figure.
Fire of Love	2022	The Fire Within: A Requiem for Katia and Maurice Krafft	2022	Both are documentaries about French volcanologists, Katia and Maurice Krafft using their archived footage.
Corsage	2022	Sisi & I	2023	Both are films about Empress Elisabeth of Austria with anachronistic soundtracks.
Elvis	2022	Priscilla	2023	Both are films about or revolve around Elvis Presley.
The Beast in the Jungle	2023	The Beast	2023	Both are French adaptations of the Henry James novella The Beast in the Jungle.
The Covenant	2023	Kandahar	2023	Also Warhorse One. All films are set in a Taliban-controlled Afghanistan.
The Great Escaper	2023	The Last Rifleman	2023	Based on the true story of Bernard Jordan, both are films about an elderly World War II veteran who escapes his nursing home in order to attend a milestone anniversary commemorations of the Normandy landings in France.
Reality	2023	Winner	2024	Both are films about American whistleblower Reality Winner.
The Pope's Exorcist	2023	The Exorcism	2024	Both films star Russell Crowe, in which he plays some form of exorcist.
Nyad	2023	Young Woman and the Sea	2024	Both films are biographical dramas about female endurance swimmers.
Totally Killer	2023	Time Cut	2024	Both films are about a female high school student who is accidentally transported back in time and must unmask an unidentified serial killer who terrorized their town and prevent the murder of a female relative who is in high school at the time.
The First Omen	2024	Immaculate	2024	Both films are about young American nuns who travel to Rome, Italy, and become unexpectedly pregnant with what turns out to be a demon fetus/the antichrist.
Trap	2024	Smile 2	2024	Both are horror films centered around solo female pop artists and their concerts.
My Penguin Friend	2024	The Penguin Lessons	2024	Both films are about a man in South America who befriends a penguin after the loss of their child.
Undercover	2024	She Walks in Darkness	2025	Both films are about a female law enforcement agent who infiltrates the ranks of the Basque separatist organization ETA.
Close Your Eyes Hind	2025	The Voice of Hind Rajab	2025	Also Hind Under Siege (2025). All three are about the Killing of Hind Rajab.
Ready or Not 2: Here I Come	2026	They Will Kill You	2026	Both films are about a pair of sisters who must avoid being hunted by wealthy elites who are members of a Satanic cult.
Idiots	2026	Nimrods	2025	Both films are about drug-fueled road trips gone wrong that both feature Mason Thames.
Runner	2026	The Runner	2026	Both films center on a protagonist racing against a ticking clock to deliver something life-saving while being pursued by dangerous forces intent on stopping them.
The Odyssey	2026	The Odyssey	2026	Both films are adaptations of Homer's ancient Greek epic poem the Odyssey. One directed by Christopher Nolan, the other by Marcel Walz.
The Dog Stars	2026	Heart of the Beast	2026	Both films center on a survivor flying around a largely empty landscape in a Cessna with a dog, and then crashing and facing adversity. Both films were released within a month of each other.

== Other meanings ==
=== One story from two perspectives ===
The term "twin films" has also been used for films produced by the same production company with the purpose of telling the same story from two different points of view:

- Anatomy of a Marriage: My Days with Françoise (1964) and Anatomy of a Marriage: My Days with Jean-Marc (1964) use the same cast to tell the same story from two different points of view.
- I Am Curious (Yellow) (1967) and I Am Curious (Blue) (1968) are a pair of Swedish drama films, both telling the story of director Vilgot Sjöman who plans to make a social film starring his lover Lena Nyman, a theatre student. Blue is a second version of Yellow (the colours taken from the Swedish flag), taking place before and after the first film. It has a more somber and bitterly satiric style, and a further explication of the framing narrative.
- The World War II films Flags of Our Fathers (2006) and Letters from Iwo Jima (2006) are about the Battle of Iwo Jima, told from the perspective of United States Marines and Japanese soldiers. Both films were directed by Clint Eastwood.
- The Disappearance of Eleanor Rigby (2014) was a trio of films following Conor Ludlow and Eleanor Rigby, a young married couple living in New York. Him looks at their relationship from Conor's angle, while Her follows Eleanor's. Them has the two twin films edited into a linear story.
- The Sister Swap (2021) films were made with real-life sisters Kimberly Williams-Paisley and Ashley Williams. Both films share nine identical scenes, but otherwise show the sisters going about their individual days leading up to Christmas.

=== Multiple-language films ===
The term "twin films" has also been used for multiple-language versions of films:

- Raavan (2010) and Raavanan (2010) use similar casts filming the scenes in both Hindi and Tamil.

== See also ==
- Barbenheimer
