= Gideon Sa'ar =

Israeli politician (born 1966)

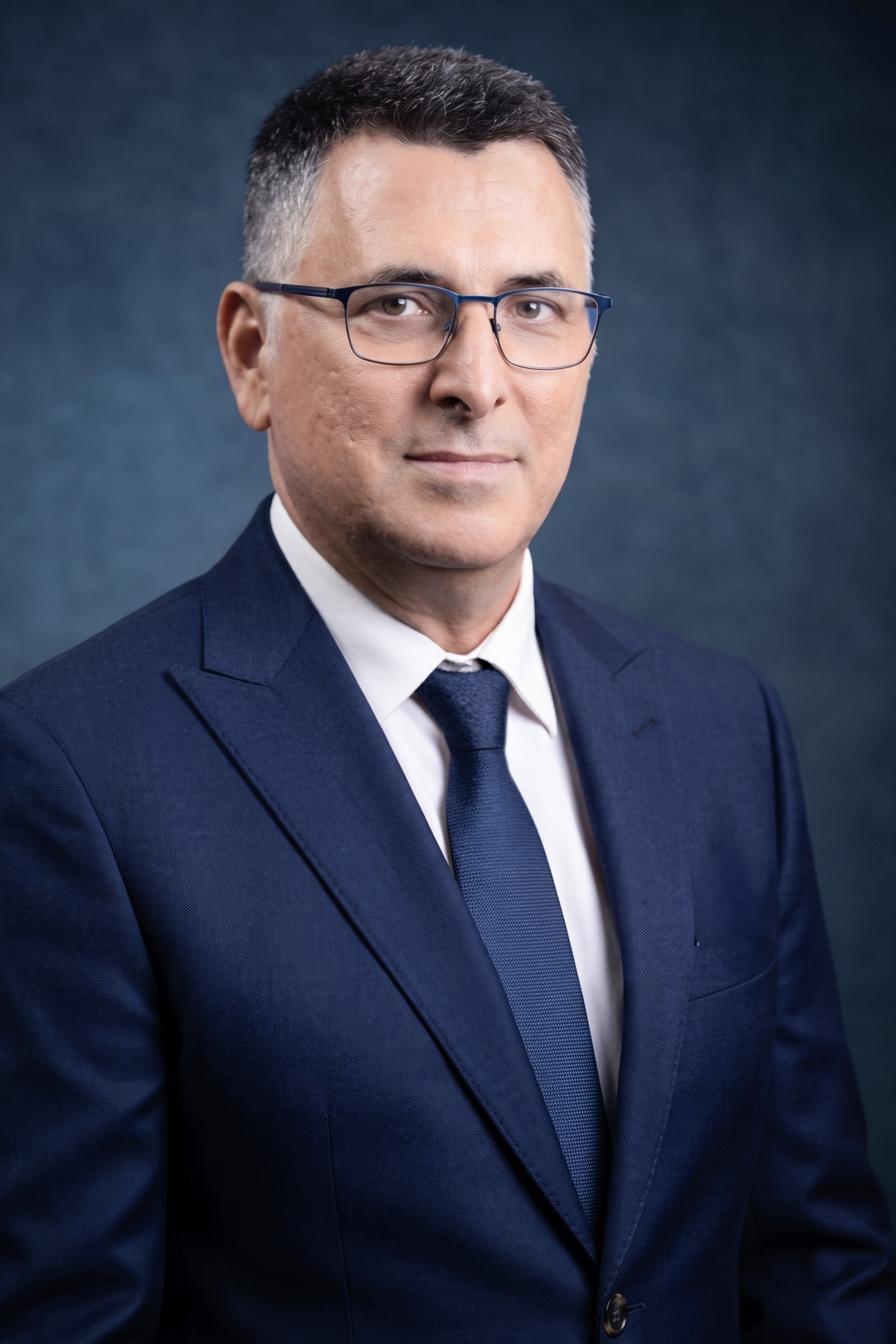
- Sa'ar in 2024

Ministerial roles
- 2009–2013: Minister of Education
- 2013–2014: Minister of the Interior
- 2021: Deputy Prime Minister
- 2021–2022: Minister of Justice
- 2023–2024: Minister without portfolio
- 2024: Minister without portfolio
- 2024–: Minister of Foreign Affairs
- 2026–: Minister of the Interior

Faction represented in the Knesset
- 2003–2014: Likud
- 2019–2020: Likud
- 2021–2022: New Hope
- 2022–2024: National Unity
- 2024–2026: New Hope
- 2026–: Likud

Personal details
- Born: 9 December 1966 (age 59) Tel Aviv, Israel

Gideon Moshe Sa'ar (Hebrew: גדעון משה סער; born 9 December 1966) is an Israeli politician currently serving as Israel's Foreign Minister, Interior Minister and as a member of the Knesset for Likud. Sa'ar was first elected to the Knesset as a member of Likud in 2003, serving until his resignation in 2014. During that period, he served as Education Minister (2009–2013) and Minister of the Interior (2013–2014) under Benjamin Netanyahu's governments.

After a political hiatus, Sa'ar returned to the Knesset in 2019, and unsuccessfully challenged Netanyahu for the leadership of Likud. He subsequently formed his own party, New Hope, and became Minister of Justice (2021–2022) and Deputy Prime Minister (2021) in the Bennett-Lapid government. In 2022, Sa'ar formed an electoral pact with Benny Gantz's Blue and White faction named National Unity. As a member of the National Unity alliance, he returned to the opposition following the 2022 elections.

Following the breakout of the Gaza war, National Unity joined the governing coalition and Sa'ar was named minister without portfolio and an observer in the war cabinet. In March 2024 Sa'ar withdrew New Hope from National Unity and from the coalition, and resigned as minister, before returning to the government in September 2024. In November 2024 Sa'ar replaced Israel Katz as Foreign Minister, with New Hope merging into Likud following the 2026 Israeli election

== Biography ==
Gideon Moshe Serchensky (later Sa'ar) was born in Tel Aviv. He has two siblings, a brother and a sister. His father was a doctor, while his mother was a teacher.

Sa'ar's mother Bruriah was born in Israel to a seventh-generation Bukharian Jewish family, whose ancestors arrived during the Ottoman Empire. His father Shmuel Serchensky (Заречанский in Cyrillic) was born in Argentina in an Ashkenazi family with roots in Moldova and Ukraine. Shmuel Serchensky immigrated to Israel from Argentina in the 1960s.

Sa'ar grew up primarily in Tel Aviv, but as a child, he lived for a number of years in Mitzpe Ramon, where his father worked as a pediatrician, and in kibbutz Sde Boker, where he was the kibbutz doctor. At the time, Sde Boker was the residence of Israel's founding prime minister, David Ben-Gurion. His father was frequently in contact with Ben-Gurion as the kibbutz doctor, and the young Gideon Sa'ar met Ben-Gurion numerous times when accompanying his father on visits to his home, during which Ben-Gurion gave him geography quizzes. Sa'ar attended Tichon Hadash high school in Tel Aviv. After serving in the Israel Defense Forces as an intelligence NCO in the Golani Brigade, Sa'ar studied political science at Tel Aviv University and then went on to study law at the same institution.

In May 2013 Sa'ar married Israeli news anchor Geula Even, with whom he has two children, David and Shira. Geula was born to Lithuanian-Jewish immigrants from the Soviet Union. Sa'ar has another two children, Alona and Daniela, from his first wife Shelly, as well as one grandchild.

== Political career ==
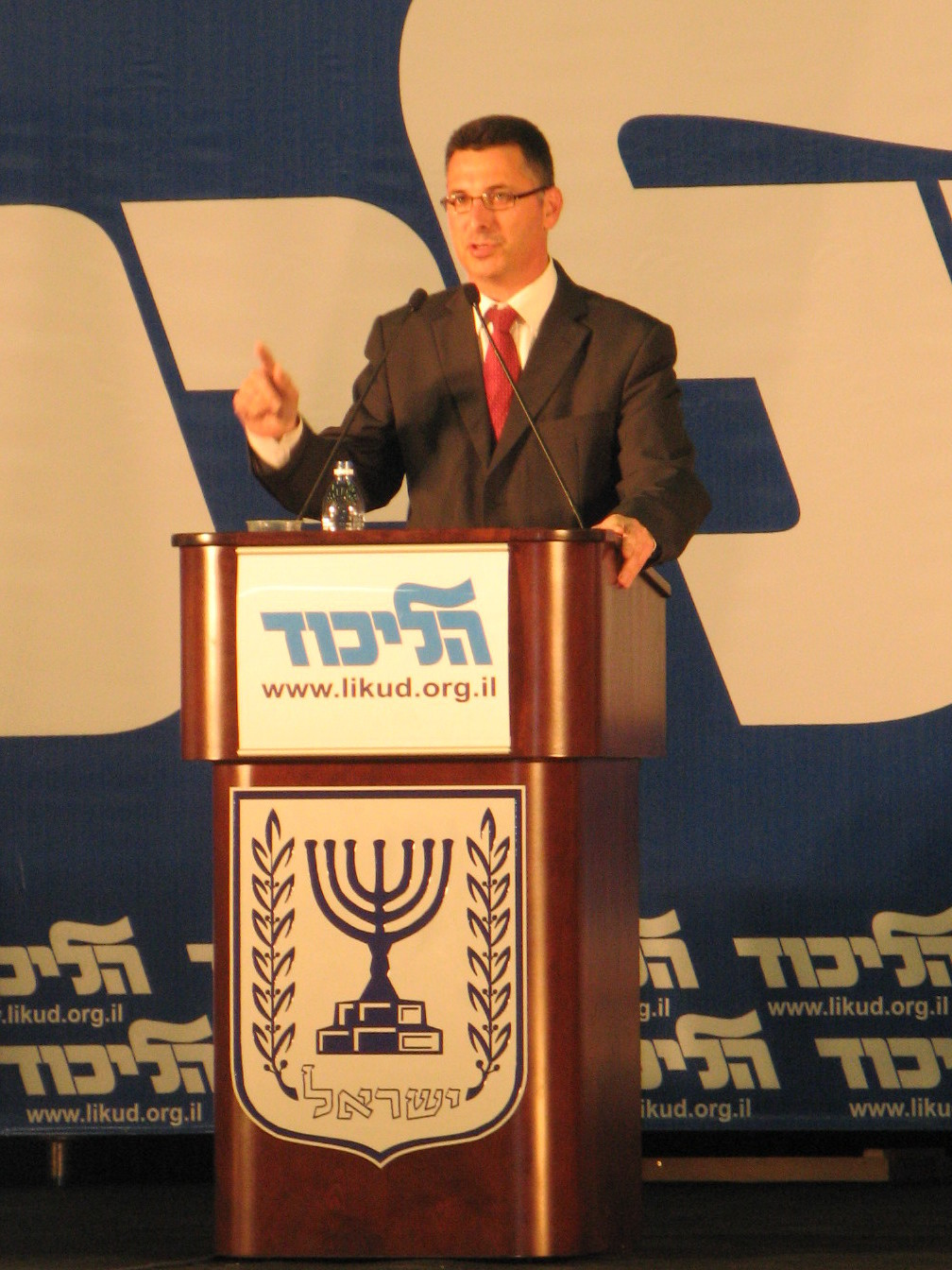
Sa'ar addresses Likud's Central Committee in 2010.

Sa'ar worked as an aide to the Attorney General between 1995 and 1997, and then as an aide to the State Attorney until 1998. Sa'ar was appointed cabinet Secretary in 1999 and again from 2001 to 2002 after Likud's Ariel Sharon won a special election for Prime Minister. In the 2003 elections he won a seat in the Knesset on Likud's list, and was appointed Likud Parliamentary Group Chairman as well as Chairman of the Coalition. He was opposed to Israel's unilateral disengagement plan, and attempted to pass a bill demanding a referendum on the subject.

After retaining his seat in the 2006 elections he was reappointed Group Chairman and also became a deputy Knesset speaker. While in the Knesset, Sa'ar proposed bills to jail employers who fire pregnant women, (he chaired the Knesset Committee on the Status of Women) and to ban cosmetics testing on animals. In December 2008, Sa'ar won the most votes the Likud's party list primary for the 2009 elections, giving him the second place on Likud's list after leader Benjamin Netanyahu. He retained his seat, and was appointed Minister of Education on 31 March.

In September 2014, Sa'ar announced that he would be resigning his post before the next election, amid allegations of sexual harassment. He said he would still remain a member of Likud. On 17 September, he took a hiatus from politics. He left the Knesset on 5 November, and was replaced by Leon Litinetsky. On 3 April 2017 Sa'ar announced his return to politics and intention to run in the next Likud primaries. He was seen as a potential candidate for party leadership and eventually prime minister. In September 2017, The Jerusalem Post ranked him 5th on its "50 most influential Jews" list, calling him the "heir apparent to the Likud throne". In September 2018, he was ranked 25th along with fellow Likud members Yisrael Katz and Gilad Erdan.

=== Likud leadership run ===
In October 2019, amid coalition talks, Prime Minister Netanyahu indicated he was considering holding a snap election for party leadership. In a terse tweet, Sa'ar responded "I'm ready." After Netanyahu decided against holding a leadership election, Sa'ar confirmed he would run in the next election and would support Netanyahu until then. On 24 November 2019, Sa'ar asked the Likud Central Committee to schedule a party leadership race within two weeks, allowing the winner to try to form a coalition government before the Knesset would be dissolved which would trigger new Knesset elections, the third in a year. After the Knesset was dissolved and elections set for 2 March 2020, leadership elections were set for 26 December 2019. Sa'ar received the endorsement of a few Likud Members of Knesset, including Haim Katz, the powerful head of the Likud central committee. Netanyahu was endorsed by Minister of Public Security Gilad Erdan while Knesset speaker Yuli Edelstein declined to endorse either candidate.

During the campaign, Netanyahu's campaign slammed Sa'ar on Twitter saying he "has aligned with the Left and the media in order to remove the prime minister from the leadership of the state". At a conference the week before, Sa'ar had spoken against the "two state illusion" and criticized Netanyahu for offering territorial concessions to Palestinian Arabs despite their typical disinterest in peace talks, saying, "Around the world, the words ”'two-state solution'” remain a kind of certificate of acceptance. I have to tell you this is not a helpful position." As was widely expected, Netanyahu won handily with 72.5% to Sa'ar's 27.5%.

=== New Hope ===
In December 2020, Sa'ar announced that he would leave Likud and will form his own party, called New Hope. He submitted his Knesset resignation on 9 December, which went into effect on 11 December. The party contested the 2021 Israeli legislative election, with the intent of forming a governing coalition, and removing Netanyahu from office. He regained his seat in the Knesset, as New Hope gained six seats at the elections. Following the election, Sa'ar became Minister of Justice in the 36th Israeli Gov't.

On 10 July 2022, Sa'ar announced that New Hope would form an electoral alliance with Benny Gantz's Blue and White, to be named National Unity. Sa'ar was second on the list. National Unity contested the 2022 Israeli legislative election, where it placed fourth with 12 seats and did not join the thirty-seventh government. Following the outbreak of the Gaza war, Sa'ar was one of five members of National Unity to join the emergency war government. Sa'ar was sworn in as a minister without portfolio on 12 October 2023.

On 12 March 2024, Sa'ar announced that New Hope would leave the National Unity alliance. On 16 March, Sa'ar threatened to withdraw New Hope from the coalition if Prime Minister Netanyahu did not appoint him to the war cabinet; Netanyahu did not do so; nine days later, Sa'ar and the rest of New Hope left the government. On 29 September, Sa'ar rejoined the Netanyahu cabinet as a minister without portfolio following a request from Netanyahu, with Sa'ar saying that his decision to return was "the patriotic and right thing to do now". On 5 November 2024, it was announced that Sa'ar would replace Israel Katz as Foreign Minister.

In March 2025, New Hope and the Likud announced an agreement to merge parties, returning Sa'ar to the Likud. After the merger was approved by the Likud's central committee, it was reported that Sa'ar and New Hope would receive reserved slots in the Likud's electoral slate for the upcoming election.

Sa'ar submitted his Knesset resignation on 8 July 2025, being replaced by Akram Hasson on 10 July.

=== Foreign minister ===
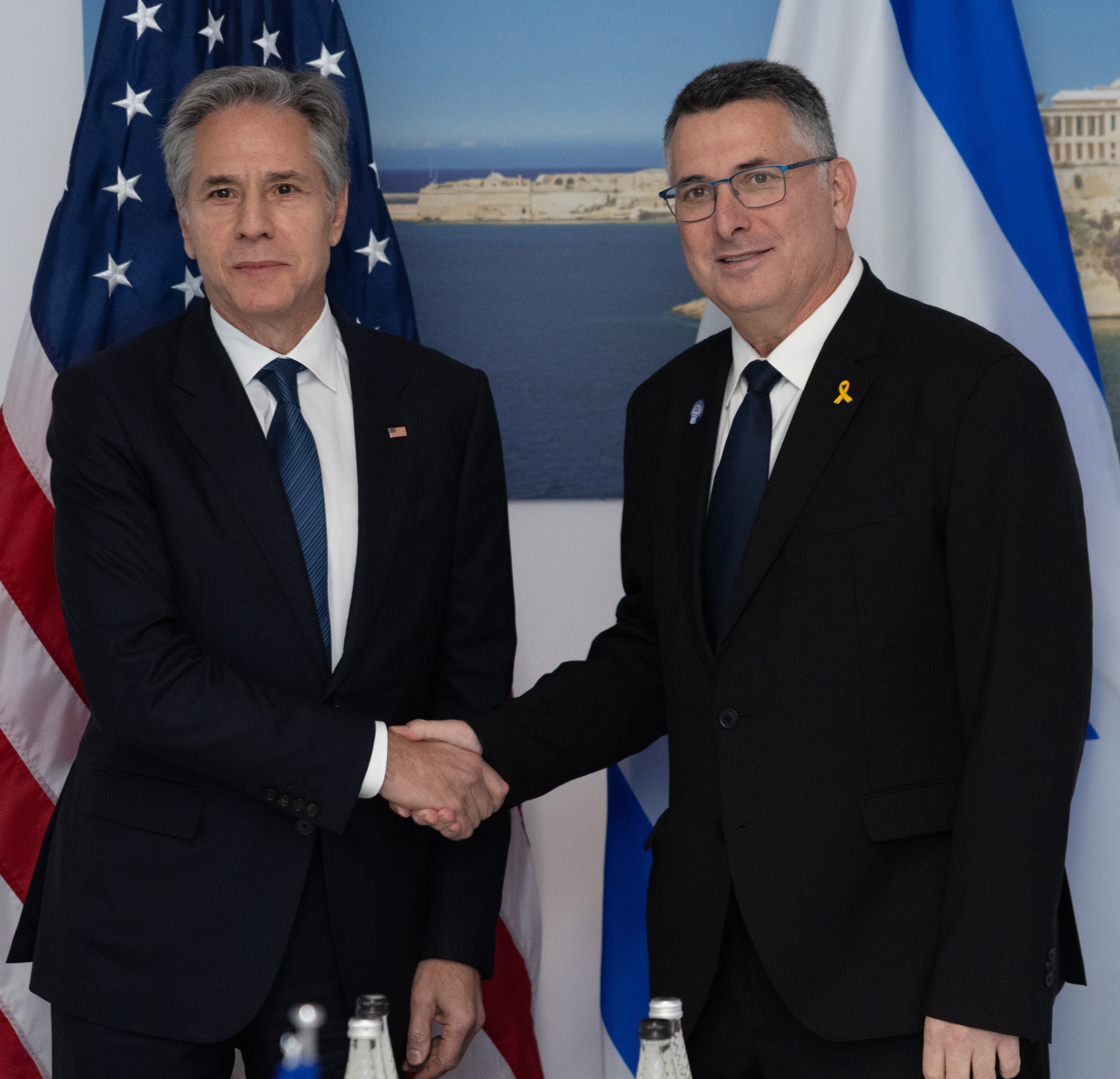
Sa'ar with US Secretary of State Antony Blinken in December 2024

On 13 February 2025 Sa'ar spoke with New Zealand Foreign Minister Winston Peters by phone about the ongoing ceasefire between Israel and Hamas and the need for its full implementation including the release of all hostages and the resumption of humanitarian aid to the Palestinians. Sa'ar also thanked New Zealand for designating Hamas and the Houthis as terrorist organisations, and extended an invitation for Peters to visit Israel. On 24 February 2025, he met with the European Union's top diplomat, Kaja Kallas, in Brussels for the first formal talks between Israel and the EU since the Gaza war.

On 15 April 2025, Sa'ar met with UK Foreign Secretary David Lammy in London. The visit to London was not publicized and the meeting with Lammy was described as private. The British Foreign Office said that Lammy and Sa'ar discussed "the ongoing hostage negotiations, protection of aid workers, the need to end the humanitarian blockade of Gaza and stop settlement expansion in the West Bank, and the Iranian nuclear issue". His visit was met with outrage by critics of Israel in the UK. British MP Zarah Sultana called his visit "a direct affront to both international law and the Palestinian people enduring genocide, military occupation and apartheid under his government". The Hind Rajab Foundation and International Centre of Justice for Palestinians wrote to the UK attorney general to apply for an arrest warrant for Sa'ar. The request claimed that Sa'ar was responsible for the attack on Kamal Adwan hospital and the detention and torture of Hussam Abu Safiya. The British attorney general rejected the request for an arrest warrant. The National reported that Sa'ar had planned to leave the UK early to avoid a potential arrest, but Lammy had privately assured him that the government would protect him from prosecution. Prime Minister Keir Starmer denied that he had been involved in the decision to deny the arrest warrant.

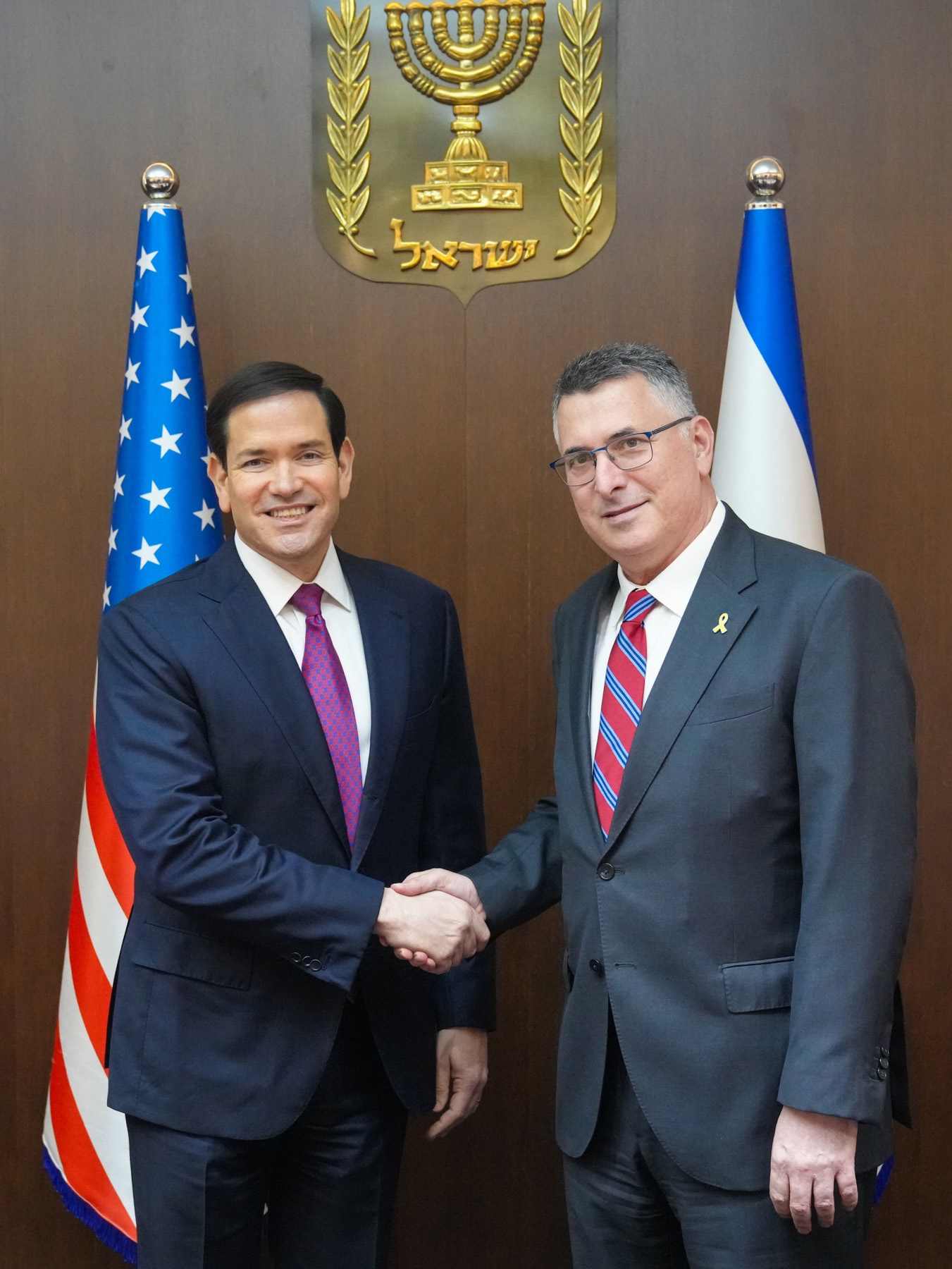
Sa'ar with US Secretary of State Marco Rubio in September 2025

On 15 July 2025, the European Union's chief diplomat, Kaja Kallas, along with the foreign ministers of EU member states, agreed not to pursue any actions against Israel concerning alleged war crimes in Gaza and settler violence in the West Bank. The proposed sanctions against Israel included suspending the EU-Israel Association Agreement, suspending visa-free travel, or blocking imports from Israeli settlements. Sa'ar welcomed the decision, saying that Israel had achieved "an important diplomatic feat by managing to push back the obsessive attempts by several European Union countries to impose sanctions on Israel."

Under Sa'ar's tenure, Israel became the first country to recognize Somaliland, a breakaway region of Somalia, as an independent state, in December 2025. In January 2026, he visited the territory and met with president Abdirahman Mohamed Abdullahi.

In January 2026, Sa'ar expressed strong support for the U.S. military action in Venezuela, which resulted in the capture of President Nicolás Maduro.

On 8 January 2026, Sa'ar issued a warning regarding the Aleppo clashes carried out by the Syrian transitional government, describing the situation as "dangerous and alarming." He emphasized that the international community in general and the West in particular have a moral obligation to the Kurds, who have bravely and successfully fought against ISIS.

In January 2026, Sa'ar strongly condemned the Iranian regime's crackdown on ongoing anti-government protests, describing it as a "massacre" of its own citizens. Sa'ar urged the European Union to designate the Islamic Revolutionary Guard Corps (IRGC) as a terrorist organization.

In July 2026, following comments by Turkish Foreign Minister Hakan Fidan in which Fidan said of Israel “These people have become a burden that humanity can no longer bear. The human conscience cannot bear it, political systems cannot sustain it, and economic systems cannot sustain it either", Sa'ar condemned Fidan's statement as a “clear call for genocide” and said in a joint statement with Rwandan Minister of Foreign Affairs and International Cooperation Olivier Nduhungirehe that "The Jewish people know all too well what happens when such words are allowed to go unanswered. The first step on the road to genocide is dehumanization."

In September 2026, the Hind Rajab Foundation filed a criminal complaint in Slovenia against Sa'ar, who is scheduled to visit the country to open the Israeli Embassy, accusing him of war crimes, genocide, and torture.

=== Interior minister ===
Sa'ar's appointment as the Minister of the Interior was approved by the cabinet in November 2026.

== Personal awards ==
In 2004 Saar was awarded the Italian honor of Ufficiale. In 2009 he was awarded the OMC badge, for "being a politician who has not been blemished to this day" and for his action to strengthen the rule of law and his firm stand against political appointments. In 2011, he was awarded an honorary degree by the President of Italy - Commendatore (Trustee) by the Italian Ambassador to Israel, Luigi Mattiolo, in recognition of his contribution to strengthening the relationship between Italy and Israel. On 17 April 2012, Sa'ar received the Orden del Mérito Civil, a first class honor awarded by the King of Spain, Juan Carlos I, for his contribution to Israel–Spain relations.

== Views and opinions ==
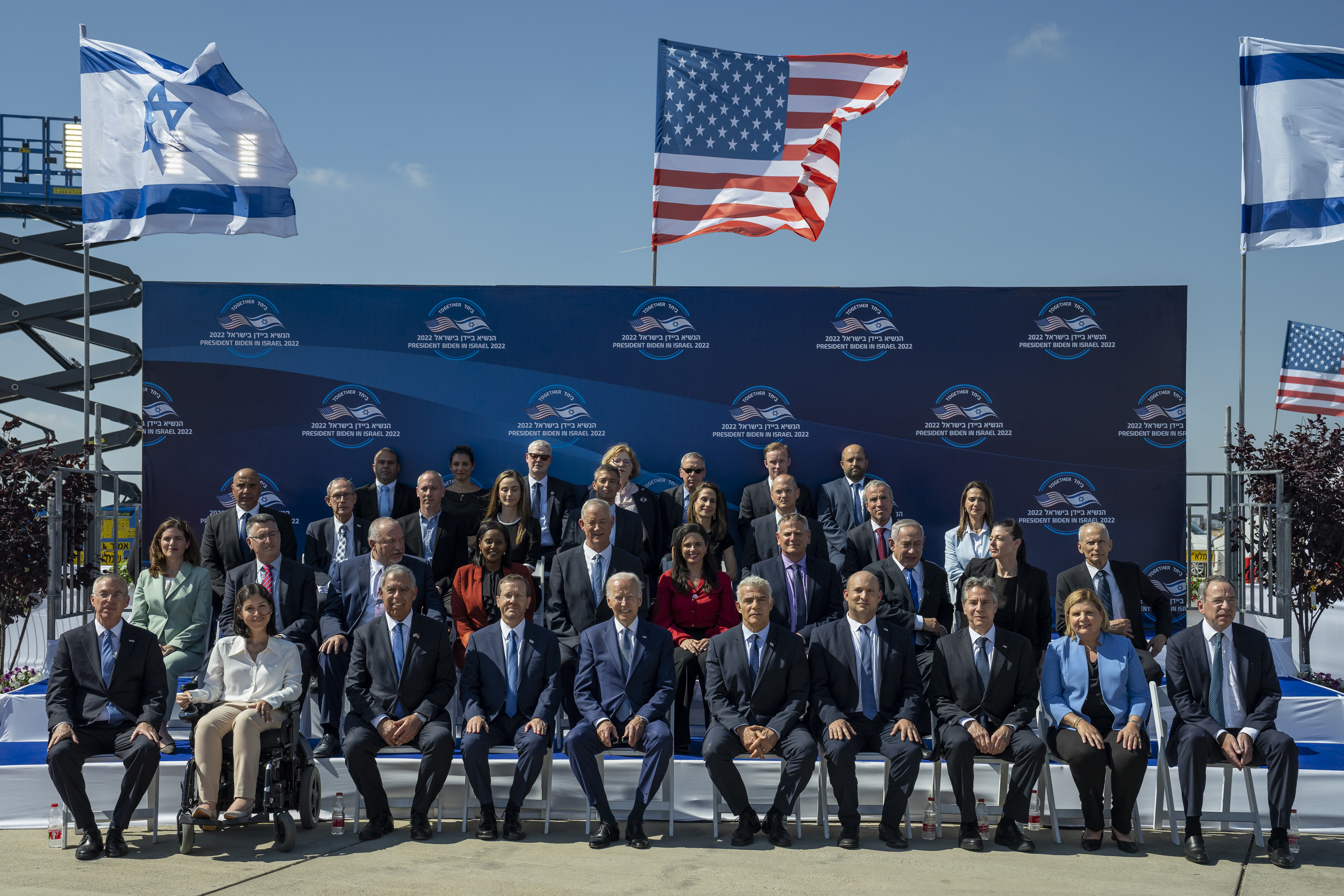
US President Joe Biden with Israeli President Isaac Herzog, Gideon Sa'ar and other Israeli officials in Tel Aviv, Israel, 13 July 2022

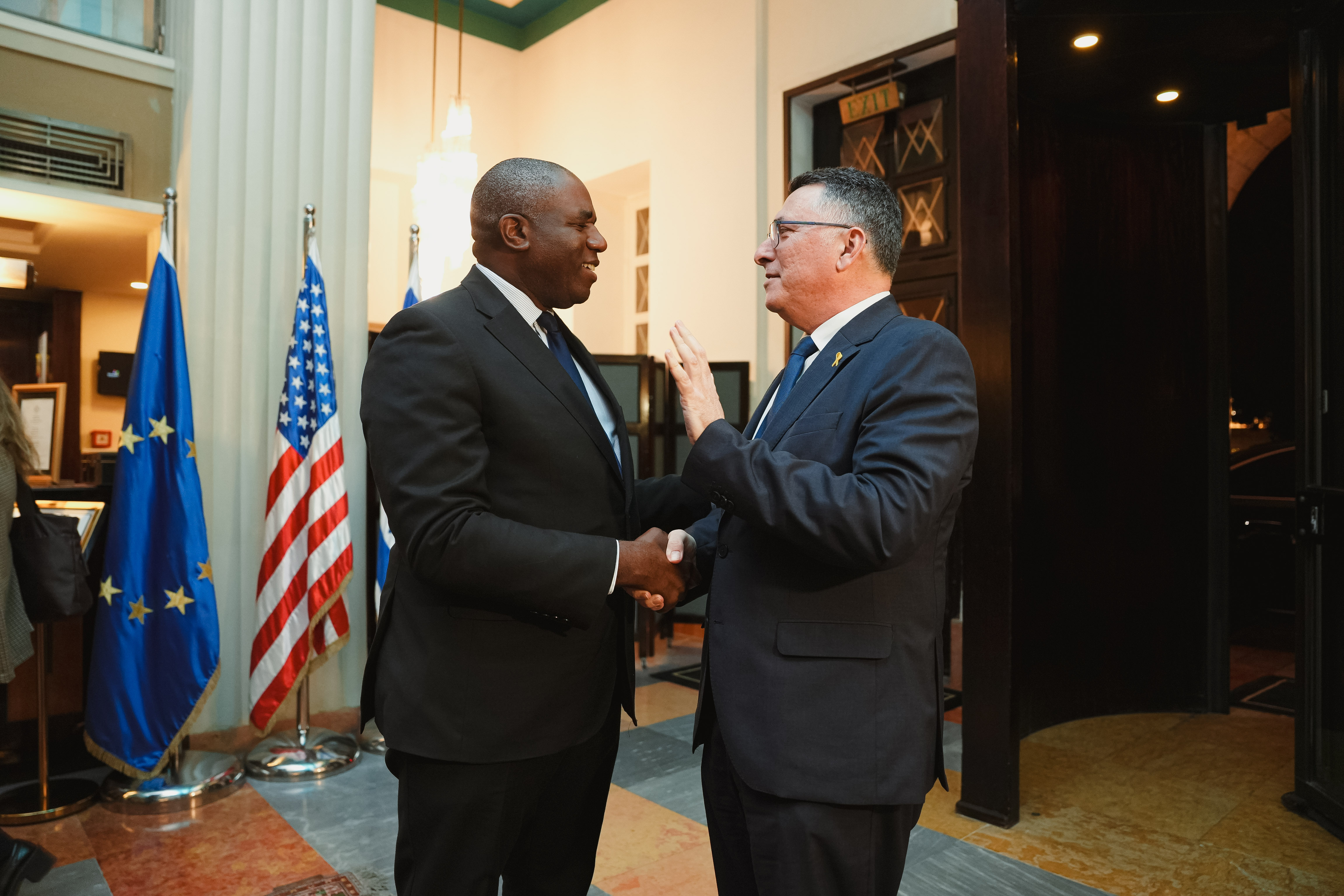
Sa'ar with British Foreign Secretary David Lammy in Israel, 12 January 2025

Sa'ar has stated that he is opposed to a two-state solution, arguing "There is no two-state solution; there is at most a two-state slogan", and that it would be "a mistake to return to the idea of establishing a Palestinian state in Judea, Samaria and Gaza as a solution to the conflict." He has expressed support for a long-term solution involving Jordan. Similar to Benjamin Netanyahu and Israel Katz, he supported an autonomous Palestinian entity with Jordanian and Egyptian affiliation. In 2020, he declared: "Between the Jordan River and the sea there won't be another independent [Palestinian] state."

As a teenager, Saar joined the ultranationalist Tehiya movement protesting the 1982 evacuation of Israeli settlements in the Sinai Peninsula as per the Egypt–Israel peace treaty. On 14 October 2023, in an interview with Israel's Channel 12 News, Sa'ar said that the Gaza Strip "must be smaller at the end" of the Gaza war, stating: "Whoever starts a war against Israel must lose territory." During the Gaza war, he also stated that he would insist that the war not be stopped until Hamas is defeated, and said that after the war the PA would not be able to control the Gaza Strip.

As he started working as foreign minister, Sa'ar stated "Israel should look to Kurds, Druze and other minorities in neighbouring countries, in addition to Saudi Arabia, for support". At his ministerial exchange and inauguration ceremony on Sunday, Sa'ar described Kurds as "our natural ally" and as "a great nation, one of the great nations without political independence". He further said that Kurds are "a national minority in four different countries, in two of which it enjoys autonomy: de facto in Syria and de jure in the Iraqi constitution", that they are "a victim of oppression and aggression from Iran and Turkey", and that Israel needed to strengthen ties to them, concluding: "This has both political and security aspects."
