= Beni Aharon =

Israeli military officer

- בני אהרון
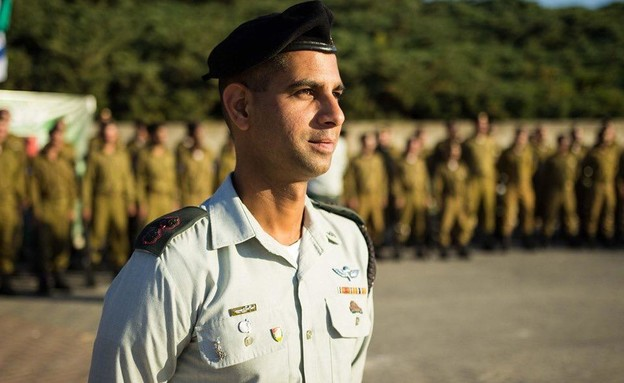
- Aharon in 2019
- Born: 14 November 1982 (age 43)
- Education: University of Haifa; Ben-Gurion University
- Military career
- Allegiance: Israel
- Branch: Israel Defense Forces
- Service years: 1999–present
- Rank: Tat-Aluf
- Unit: Israeli Ground Forces
- Commands: 8th Armored Brigade; 401st Brigade; 146th Division
- Conflicts: Operation Defensive Shield; Second Lebanon War; Operation Cast Lead; Operation Pillar of Defense; Operation Brother's Keeper; Operation Protective Edge; Operation Swords of Iron; Invasion of Gaza Strip; Operation Local Operation; Battle of Rafah

Beni Aharon (Note: also rendered Benny Aharon) (Hebrew: בני אהרון; born 14 November 1982) is an Israeli military officer who serves as the commander of the 146th Division since September 2025. He previously served as the commander of the Israel Defense Forces' (IDF) 401st Armored Brigade. He has been considered for the position of IDF chief spokesperson and was subsequently accused of authorizing the targeting and killing of a 5-year-old Palestinian girl, Hind Rajab, and members of her family.

== Biography ==
Benny Aharon was born in Eilat to Reuven and Nurit Aharon, the first of four brothers. He studied at the Haifa Command Military Boarding School, class 16. Upon graduation, he enlisted in 2001 in the 188th Brigade and commanded units in a number of operational and training positions, including commander of a company in the 71st Battalion and commander of the Tank Commanders Course Company in the 196th Battalion. In 2011, he was appointed deputy commander of Battalion 53. In 2012–2014, he was head of the office of Southern Command Colonel Tal Russo, including during Operation Pillar of Defense, and later under Sami Turgeman during Operation Protective Edge.

After being promoted to the rank of lieutenant colonel, he was appointed commander of Battalion 198 in 2015 and served in the position until 2016. In 2016–2017, he commanded Battalion 75 and was later appointed commander of Battalion 196. In 2019–2020, he served as deputy commander of the 188th Brigade. On July 16, 2020, he was appointed commander of the 8th Brigade with the rank of lieutenant colonel. He also serves as a staff commander at the "Alon" Command and Staff College. In May 2022, he was appointed commander of the 401st Brigade.

=== Training Operation: Lebanon ===
In 2019, Aharon helped oversee training between Israeli armored units and other branches of its military in simulations of an Israeli invasion of a Lebanese village controlled by Hezbollah. Aharon said an important part of training was learning to counter military units who spend most of their time hidden below ground and then appear at the surface only briefly to militarily engage.

=== Paths of Fire ===
In a January 2023 interview with Newsweek, Aharon said that Israeli forces had practiced for "a new plan," which entailed Israeli forces entering Gaza itself. Aharon said that in his 20 years of military experience, while Israel frequently used air operations to fight its enemies, a larger operation involving ground forces was needed every 4–5 years. Aharon said that the operation, "Paths of Fire," planned for the use of "the most powerful units in the IDF," and that while Hamas was likely to surprise Israel in their next conflict, through training, Aharon said "we're going to surprise Hamas."

=== October 7 ===
"I saw Hamas vans on the way and just ran over them."

— Beni Aharon, interview with Ynet, 2023

During the October 7 attacks, Aharon commandeered a tank at Nahal Oz and began to fight against Hamas forces. Driving to Re'im, Aharon said, "I saw Hamas vans on the way and just ran over them." Aharon made his way to the site of the Nova music festival massacre, fought until his tank had no more fuel, and then was driven to Be'eri, where he managed to break into the Kibbutz.

Aharon was called to join Israeli forces at Sderot, where Israeli SWAT police besieged a police station controlled by Hamas fighters. Aharon fought at the police station "persistently." Unable to dislodge the fighters, Aharon called a friend who advised "we should aim at the lower part of the building. It worked – and the building was set on fire, suffocating the terrorists." Aharon filmed video footage of the fight at the police station, later released in 2024. Approximately 30 Israeli police and civilians were killed at the police station, and 10 Hamas fighters.

=== Gaza war ===
"It's hard to believe that people who lived here didn't see trucks and dozens of people digging… they all knew what was happening.."

— Beni Aharon, interview with The Times of Israel in Gaza City, 2023

During the Gaza War, Aharon fought as commander of the 401st armored brigade. Giving Israeli media a tour of Gaza Square in the heart of Gaza City in December 2023, Aharon said that what seemed to be civilian buildings and infrastructure were in fact supporting Hamas's military operations: "Regular homes of civilians, that people seemingly live in the day-to-day, but in reality, they are either a hideout apartment for terrorists." Aharon showed media tunnels and said, "It's hard to believe that people who lived here didn't see trucks and dozens of people digging… they all knew what was happening."

In October 2024, Aharon said that his unit discovered a Hamas data center located beneath the United Nations Relief and Works Agency for Palestine Refugees in the Near East (UNRWA) headquarters in Gaza. That same month, Aharon was named as a likely successor to Meir Biderman as deputy head of the IDF's 162nd Division.

==== Killing of Hind Rajab ====
On 3 May 2025, the Hind Rajab Foundation announced that it had identified Lieutenant Colonel Beni Aharon as the commander of the 401st Armored Brigade, which was involved in the killing of five-year-old Palestinian girl Hind Rajab during the Israeli invasion of the Gaza Strip. On 29 January 2024, Hind and her family were attempting to flee Gaza City when their vehicle came under fire from Israeli tanks in the Tel al-Hawa neighborhood. The attack killed six of her family members, leaving Hind trapped in the wreckage. She made a distress call to emergency services, pleading for help. When a Palestinian Red Crescent ambulance was dispatched to rescue her, it was also targeted and destroyed by Israeli forces, killing the two paramedics on board. Subsequent investigations, including one by Forensic Architecture, concluded that the vehicle had been struck by hundreds of bullets at close range and that the ambulance was hit by a tank-fired shell. The foundation filed a war crimes complaint against Aharon with the International Criminal Court, alleging that the actions constituted deliberate targeting of civilians and medical personnel. In October 2025, the foundation expanded its submission with a 120-page Article 15 filing naming Aharon among 24 Israeli soldiers and commanders said to be responsible for the killings.

=== Commander of the 146th Division ===
In September 2025 he was appointed as the commander of the 146th Division, a reserve armoured division in the Northern Command.

== See also ==
- Israeli war crimes in the Gaza war
- Outline of the Gaza war
