= 2019 Likud leadership election =

Leadership election in Likud party

- 26 December 2019
- Turnout: 49%
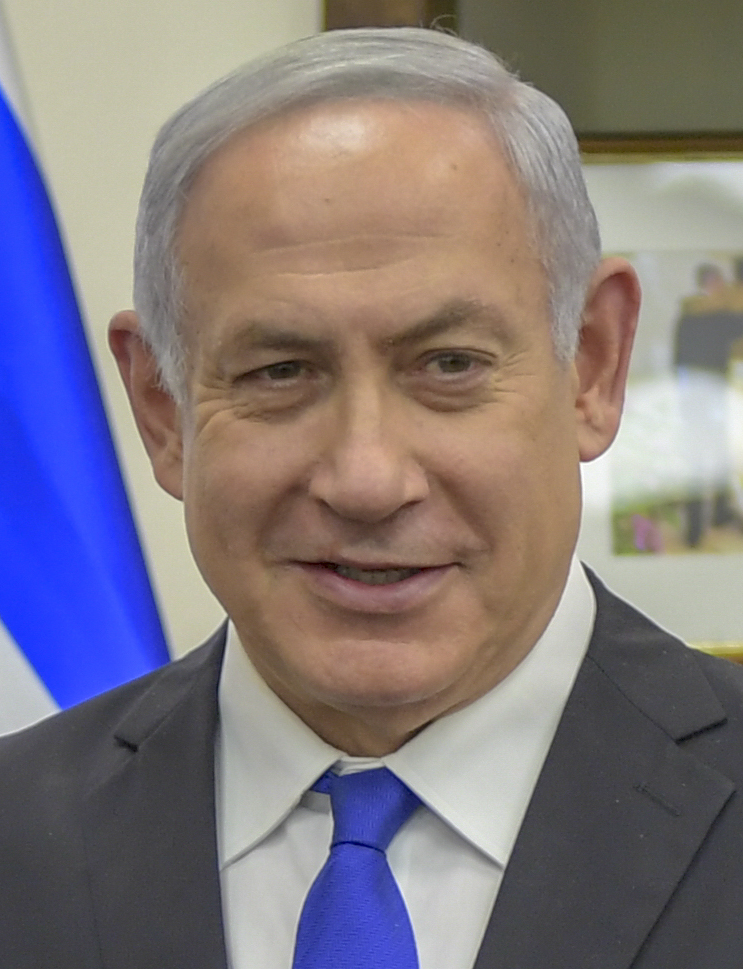

Candidate	Benjamin Netanyahu	Gideon Sa'ar
Party	Likud	Likud
Popular vote	41,792	15,885
Percentage	72.5%	27.5%
Likud leader before election
Benjamin Netanyahu
Likud leader after election
Benjamin Netanyahu

A leadership election was held by the Likud party on 26 December 2019. Incumbent Benjamin Netanyahu defeated Gideon Sa'ar by a large majority.

== Background ==
After the April 2019 Israeli legislative election, Netanyahu was unable to form a coalition by the deadline of 29 May. Instead of letting Benny Gantz attempt to form a coalition of his own, the majority of the Knesset dissolved itself, and a snap election was held on 17 September 2019.

The second election was inconclusive, prompting warnings of a third election. The threat was deemed unacceptable by the opposition and the general public, and Netanyahu called on Gantz to form a national unity government, even offering to cede the position of Prime Minister some time in the future. Gantz rejected this offer, noting that Netanyahu's proposed unity government would include all of Netanyahu's right-wing allies, but none of Gantz's centre-left allies. Yair Lapid, then a member of Gantz's Blue and White alliance, also refused to sit with Likud as long as Netanyahu was its leader, due to the criminal cases against Netanyahu.

In October 2019, amid coalition talks, Netanyahu indicated that he was considering holding snap primaries for party leadership. Gideon Sa'ar said in a tweet, "I'm ready." After Netanyahu decided against holding a leadership election, Sa'ar said that he would run in the next election and would support Netanyahu until then.

On 21 November 2019, Netanyahu was officially indicted for breach of trust, accepting bribes, and fraud. As a result of the indictment, some in Likud began to support Sa'ar in his bid for the chairmanship of the party. On 24 November 2019, Sa'ar asked the Likud Central Committee to schedule a party leadership race within two weeks.

== Polling ==
Poll	Date	Netanyahu	Sa'ar	Other / Don't Know
Channel 13	25 November 2019	53%	40%	7%
Walla!	26 November 2019	82%	12%	6%
Channel 12	26 November 2019	89%	4%	7%

== Results ==
2019 Likud leadership election
Candidate	Votes	Percentage
Benjamin Netanyahu	41,792	72.5%
Gideon Sa'ar	15,885	27.5%

Sa’ar won 7 of the 116 polling places, with Netanyahu winning the rest. Nearly all of Sa’ar's victories were in majority Druze towns and cities, indicating that Druze voters were still upset over Netanyahu's support of the 2018 Nation State Bill.

== Aftermath ==
The 2020 election was initially a stalemate, which was resolved when Likud reached a coalition agreement with Blue and White. Under the terms of the agreement, the premiership would rotate between Benjamin Netanyahu and Benny Gantz, with Gantz given the new position of Alternate Prime Minister until November 2021. The new cabinet did not include Gideon Sa'ar.

Following the new cabinet's collapse over budgetary issues in December 2020, Sa'ar announced that he would leave Likud, and will form his own party, called New Hope. The party contested the 2021 Israeli legislative election, with the intent of forming a governing coalition, and removing Netanyahu from office, and won six seats. Sa'ar later joined Netanyahu's government in 2024, and New Hope signed a merger agreement with Likud the following year.
