= Killing of Hind Rajab =

2024 killing of a Palestinian child in the Gaza Strip

- Part of the Gaza war and the Gaza genocide
- Rajab at her graduation ceremony for senior kindergarten

- Location within the Gaza Strip
- Location: 31°30′49″N 34°26′13″E; Tel al-Hawa, Gaza Strip
- Date: 29 January 2024
- Attack type: Mass homicide, child homicide by gunshot; war crime
- Deaths: 9 civilians
- Perpetrators: Israeli Ground Forces: 401st Brigade (Beni Aharon, per Hind Rajab Foundation); "Vampire Empire" company (Major Sean Glass and Itay Choukirkov, per Hind Rajab Foundation)

Hind Rami Iyad Rajab (Arabic: هند رامي إياد رجب; 3 May 2018 – 29 January 2024) was a five-year-old (Note: Most media sources reported Rajab's age at death as six years old. Euro-Mediterranean Human Rights Monitor and CNN reported that Rajab was five years old. A list released by the Gaza Health Ministry in September 2024 of people killed during the Gaza war with their ID number, age, gender, and birthdate listed Rajab as having been 5 years old.) Palestinian girl in the Gaza Strip who was killed by the Israel Defense Forces (IDF), which also killed six of her family members and two paramedics coming to her rescue, during the Gaza war.

On 29 January 2024, Rajab and her family were fleeing Gaza City when their vehicle was shelled by the IDF, killing her uncle, aunt and three cousins, with Rajab and another cousin surviving and contacting the Palestine Red Crescent Society (PRCS) to ask for help while noting that they were being attacked by an Israeli tank. The cousin was later also killed and Rajab was left stranded in the vehicle for hours on the phone, as paramedics from PRCS attempted to rescue her. Both Rajab and the paramedics were later also found dead on 10 February after an Israeli withdrawal.

Israel claimed that there were not any troops present in the neighborhood and denied carrying out the attack. However, this was refuted by The Washington Post and Sky News's investigations relying on satellite imagery and visual evidence, which concluded that a number of Israeli tanks were indeed present and one had likely fired 335 rounds on the car that Rajab and her family had been in, with tank operators being able to see that the car had civilians including children in it. The Forensic Architecture investigation also concluded that an Israeli tank had also likely attacked the ambulance that came for Rajab.

On 19 August 2026, the Israeli Defense Force finally admitted its soldiers had fired upon the car taking Hind and announced that they had launched a criminal investigation into her death; Hind's family has shown skepticism that justice would be served from the investigation.

In the aftermath of the killing, many Western media outlets were criticized for not attributing who killed Rajab and for their adultification of her. American student protestors occupied and renamed Hamilton Hall in her honor at Columbia University, drawing increased attention to the killings. The feature film The Voice of Hind Rajab (2025) follows the story of her killing.

== Background ==
By November 2023, about a month after the Israeli invasion of the Gaza Strip, much of Gaza was heavily damaged, largely deserted, and bombed-out. By December 2023, the healthcare system in Gaza was close to collapse due to Israeli attacks and a blockade of humanitarian aid. Northern Gaza was particularly affected, as there were no functioning hospitals in the area by December due to shortage of supplies, fuel and staff.

== Killing ==
On 29 January 2024, Rajab along with six of her family members were fleeing from the Gaza City neighborhood of Tel al-Hawa, when an Israeli army tank shot their vehicle, a black Kia, killing Rajab's aunt, uncle, and three cousins. The only other survivor, Rajab's 15-year-old cousin Layan Hamadeh, called the Palestine Red Crescent Society (PRCS) for emergency aid. Hamadeh was crying, further adding that "They are shooting at us. The tank is right next to me. We're in the car, the tank is right next to us."

Hamadeh was heard screaming as she was killed under the sound of machine gun fire raking the car while still on the line with responders. When the dispatchers called back, Rajab answered the call, stating everyone else in the car was dead and that the tank continued to approach the car. Rajab stayed on the line with the PRCS for three hours, telling the dispatcher, "I'm so scared, please come. Come take me. Please, will you come?" Her grandfather later told reporters that Rajab was injured in the back, hand and foot. Rajab, who was instructed to continue hiding in the vehicle, was set to be rescued by a PRCS ambulance. The audio of the phone call between the PRCS, Hamadeh and Rajab was published by the Red Crescent on 3 February.

As the area was besieged, the PRCS worked with the Gaza Health Ministry and the Israeli military to guarantee safe passage for their ambulance crew to rescue Rajab. After hours of waiting, the PRCS says it was given the approval to send the ambulance along a designated route. The ambulance reported that they were being targeted by the Israeli military with lasers; according to the Washington Post, social media posts suggest that these lasers have in the past also been used by Hamas, but that a researcher at the Institute for the Study of War had not observed the use of such lasers by either side in the conflict. After sounds of gunfire or an explosion, the connection was lost.

The fate of Rajab and the paramedics was unknown until 12 days later on 10 February 2024, when the family returned after the withdrawal of the Israeli military, discovering the car with Rajab, Hamadeh, and the rest of her uncle's entire family deceased. The windows were blown out, and the doors were covered with bullet holes. The Red Crescent ambulance was found a few feet away, completely destroyed with two ambulance workers, Yusuf al-Zeino and Ahmed al-Madhoun, also killed.

== Investigation ==
The destroyed car that belonged to Rajab's uncle

According to an initial investigation from the Euro-Mediterranean Human Rights Monitor, Rajab and her relatives were killed by the Israeli army in a "planned execution"; using a US-made missile, the IDF also killed the Red Crescent paramedics sent to rescue the young girl. Shell fragments of an American-made M830A1 projectile were found at the site of the bombed Red Crescent ambulance that was looking for Rajab and her family. A spokesperson for the U.S. government said that it would wait for Israel to conclude its investigation of the incident.

An IDF spokesperson stated there were no IDF troops near the vehicle or within firing range and that, due to the lack of troops, ambulance coordination was unnecessary to rescue Rajab. In response to the IDF statements, Al Jazeera stated, "Israel has a history of swiftly clearing its troops of any wrongdoing in cases of abuse against Palestinians." An Al Jazeera investigation further found that three Israeli tanks were in the vicinity of Rajab's family vehicle at the time of the attack.

The investigation was handed over to the General Staff Fact-Finding Assessment Mechanism, described as "an independent military body responsible for investigating unusual incidents amid the war". The United States raised calls for Rajab's death to be investigated in a timely manner, stating that they were "devastated" about Rajab's death. PRCS told The Intercept that the Israeli military never contacted it regarding the killing of Rajab and the attack on its ambulances, refuting the State Department's remarks that PRCS and the United Nations had rebuffed Israeli efforts to investigate the incident.

An investigation conducted by The Washington Post in April 2024 countered claims made by the Israeli military. The investigation, which used satellite imagery, concluded that Israeli armored vehicles were in the vicinity of the car where Rajab was killed, and the 300mm hole on the Red Crescent ambulance is consistent with an Israeli tank round, although it cautioned that this was just one explanation, as "there is little data on craft-produced Hamas munitions". The Post also confirmed that the wreckage of the ambulance was found on a route provided by COGAT, an arm of the Israeli Defense Ministry that coordinates safe passages for medical vehicles with the IDF.

Sky News reported in October 2024 that the damage to the ambulance was consistent with having been hit by a "large calibre weapon", citing an expert from Janes Information Services. The report indicated that while the IDF said it was not in the area at the time of the incident, it may have inadvertently contradicted this assertion by publishing a press release about its operations in the Shati and Tel al-Hawa neighborhoods, which was later deleted from its website. Further investigation by Sky News revealed satellite imagery taken on 29 January, the day of the attack, showing at least 15 military vehicles in the Tel al-Hawa neighborhood, with the closest vehicle located just 300 meters from the site of the ambulance attack.

Forensic Architecture publicized its investigation in June 2024, which relied on visual, audio and other collected evidence, to reconstruct the event. The investigation concluded that an Israeli tank had likely fired 335 rounds on the car that Rajab and her family had been in, and that tank operators would have been able to see that the car had civilians including children in it. It also concluded that an Israeli tank had also likely attacked the ambulance that came to the aid of Rajab. Independent experts appointed in July 2024 by the United Nations Human Rights Council stated Rajab's killing might amount to a war crime.

Shortly after Rajab's death, the Palestinian Foreign Ministry called on the International Criminal Court (ICC) to hold accountable those responsible for her death. On 13 February 2024, the human rights group Justice For All submitted a case to the ICC charging the IDF with multiple war crimes for the killing of Rajab. On 3 May 2025, which would have been Hind's seventh birthday, the Hind Rajab Foundation claimed that it had identified the commander of the battalion that had killed Hind as Lieutenant Colonel Beni Aharon of the 401st Armored Brigade, and filed a war crimes complaint against him with the ICC.

=== IDF criminal investigation ===
On 19 August 2026, the IDF announced that they had launched a criminal investigation into the death of Hind Rajab and the deaths of the ambulance crew. In a statement the IDF admitted for the first time that its troops had fired on the Hamada's car, stating that the vehicle had been moving towards Israeli soldiers "while travelling contrary to the advanced notice". The decision was made by the Military Advocate General, the top legal body of the IDF, after cases are referred to them by the General Staff Fact-Finding Assessment Mechanism. On the same day, the Israeli Government announced they were opening a criminal investigation into the case of 15 rescue workers killed in a convoy Rafah in March 2025, but had closed the case relating to the World Central Kitchen aid convoy attack and the cases of two separate killings of Doctors Without Borders employees.

The Hind Rajab Foundation, created in her wake, stated it had "no confidence" in the investigation, adding that Israel's investigations system is "fundamentally flawed and cannot be regarded as credible mechanisms of accountability."

== Response and impact ==
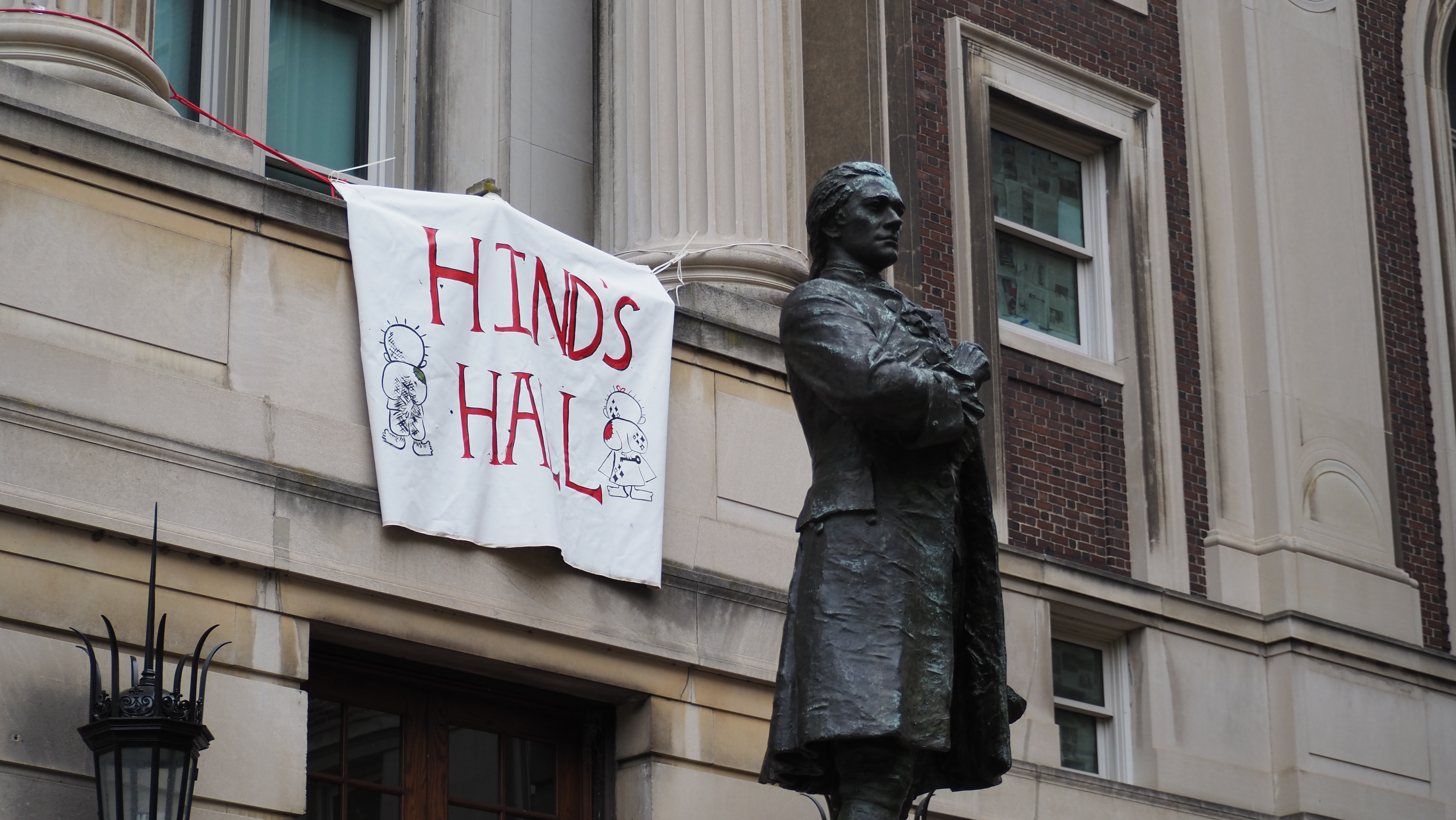
A banner renaming Hamilton Hall at Columbia University "Hind's Hall" after the Gaza Solidarity Encampment

During the 12 days she was missing, Rajab's case garnered international attention with calls by activists and humanitarian organizations to find her and bring her to safety. Her mother begged for the international community not to forget her daughter and to bring her home. The Palestine Red Crescent Society utilized their social media accounts to post photos of both paramedics and Rajab for multiple days, while appealing for information about their locations. Multiple news agencies reached out to the Israeli military for comment about the incident. On 2 February, the Israeli military told CNN reporters it was "unfamiliar with the incident". When they were contacted again three days later, they reported they "were still looking into it".

After the discovery of her body, many pro-Palestinian figures criticised Western media outlets for stating that Rajab had been "found dead" without attributing her death to Israel, contrasting it with the sympathetic coverage of the deaths of children in the Russian invasion of Ukraine. Rajab's mother condemned the Israeli army after the confirmed death of her daughter, stating, "How many more mothers are you waiting to feel this pain? How many more children do you want to get killed?". The Red Crescent laid the blame for the incident on Israel, accusing it of deliberately targeting the ambulance crew.

In April 2024, pro-Palestinian student protesters participating in the occupation of Columbia University in New York City seized Hamilton Hall, an academic building on the university's campus. The students unfurled a large banner renaming the building "Hind's Hall" in honor of the child. During a segment on CNN that discussed the renaming of the hall, host Kasie Hunt explained to viewers: "Hind is a reference to a woman who was killed in Gaza." This description was criticized as an example of the adultification of Palestinian children and a pro-Israel bias on CNN. On 16 May, student protesters at the University of California, Berkeley, occupied an abandoned historic campus building known as the Anna Head complex and renamed it "Hind's House". Owen Jones argued in an August 2024 editorial that Rajab's killing fit into a pattern of other Israeli atrocities. He wrote, "After each atrocity it perpetrates, the Israeli state has a standard modus operandi: deny, deflect, deceive, and wait for attention to move elsewhere."

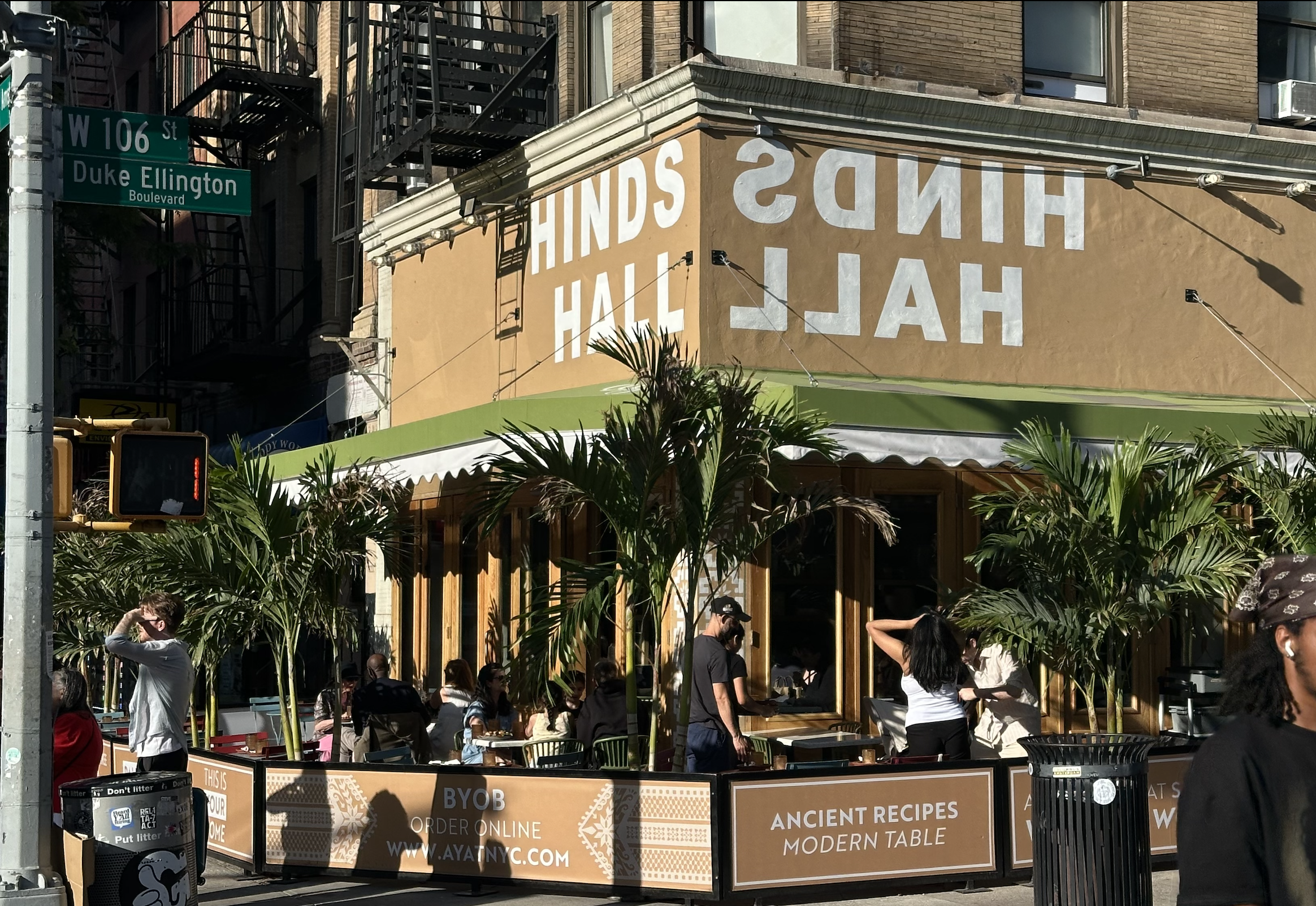
Hinds Hall, a branch of the Palestinian restaurant Ayat

The Hind Rajab Foundation, an organization dedicated to holding Israeli soldiers accountable for alleged war crimes, is named after her. At the one year anniversary from Rajab's killing, a vigil was organised at Zuccotti Park in New York by Palestinian groups on 29 January 2025. As a reaction, the group Betar US announced a counter-protest at the park, calling the event a "jihad rally" and promised to record the attendees in an effort to get them deported by U.S. Immigration and Customs Enforcement (ICE). At the vigil, hecklers shouted "Show us your faces so we could get you deported", and "We're with ICE", then repeatedly chanting, "ICE, ICE, ICE", according to a video posted by the group. Social media personality Ms. Rachel stated that she had been in contact with Rajab's mother.

In September 2025, the United Nations Independent International Commission of Inquiry on the Occupied Palestinian Territory released a report concluding that Israel committed genocide in Gaza. The report included the killing of Hind Rajab and her family as an example of the genocidal act of killing members of the group. In April 2026, Ayat, a Palestinian restaurant, opened a location on the Upper West Side of Manhattan named Hinds Hall. The name references Rajab and the 2024 occupation of Hamilton Hall at Columbia University.

In July 2026, Drop Site News published an article stating that Clock Tower X was hired by the Israeli government to create websites intended to influence AI chatbots, including misinformation about the killing of Hind Rajab.

== Depictions in media ==
In May 2024, American rapper Macklemore released "Hind's Hall", a protest song honoring Rajab and supporting student protests. He criticized the music industry's supposed prioritization of "petty issues" such as the Drake–Kendrick Lamar feud over the war. As part of the track's release, Macklemore stated that all proceeds generated from streams would go towards UNRWA. In September 2024, he followed up with "Hind's Hall 2", which also directed its proceeds to UNRWA. The new track featured vocals from Palestinian rapper MC Abdul, Palestinian-American singer Anees, author and activist Amer Zahr, and choir vocals from the L.A. Palestinian Kids Choir, Lifted! Youth Gospel Choir, Tiffany Wilson, and Friends.

In 2025, three films about Hind Rajab were released; the Dutch short film Close Your Eyes Hind by Syrian-Dutch filmmaker Amir Zaza premiered at the 2025 Netherlands Film Festival where it won the Golden Calf for Best Short Film; the Tunisian feature film The Voice of Hind Rajab by Tunisian filmmaker Kaouther Ben Hania follows the events from the International Red Cross and Red Crescent Movement volunteers' point-of-view, it had its world premiere in the main competition of the 82nd Venice International Film Festival where it won the festival's Grand Jury Prize. And the Jordanian short film Hind Under Siege by Jordanian-Palestinian filmmaker Naji Salameh, which premiered at the inaugural Gaza International Festival for Women's Cinema on 27 October 2025, where it won the Jury Award for Best Narrative Short Film.

== See also ==
- Battle of Tel al-Hawa
- Effect of the Gaza war on children in the Gaza Strip
- Hind Rajab Foundation – EU-based human rights organization
- Israeli war crimes
- Killing of health workers in the Gaza war
- Killing of Mohammad Bhar – Killing of mentally disabled Palestinian man by Israeli forces
