= Geula Even =

Israeli journalist and TV presenter

- גאולה אבן
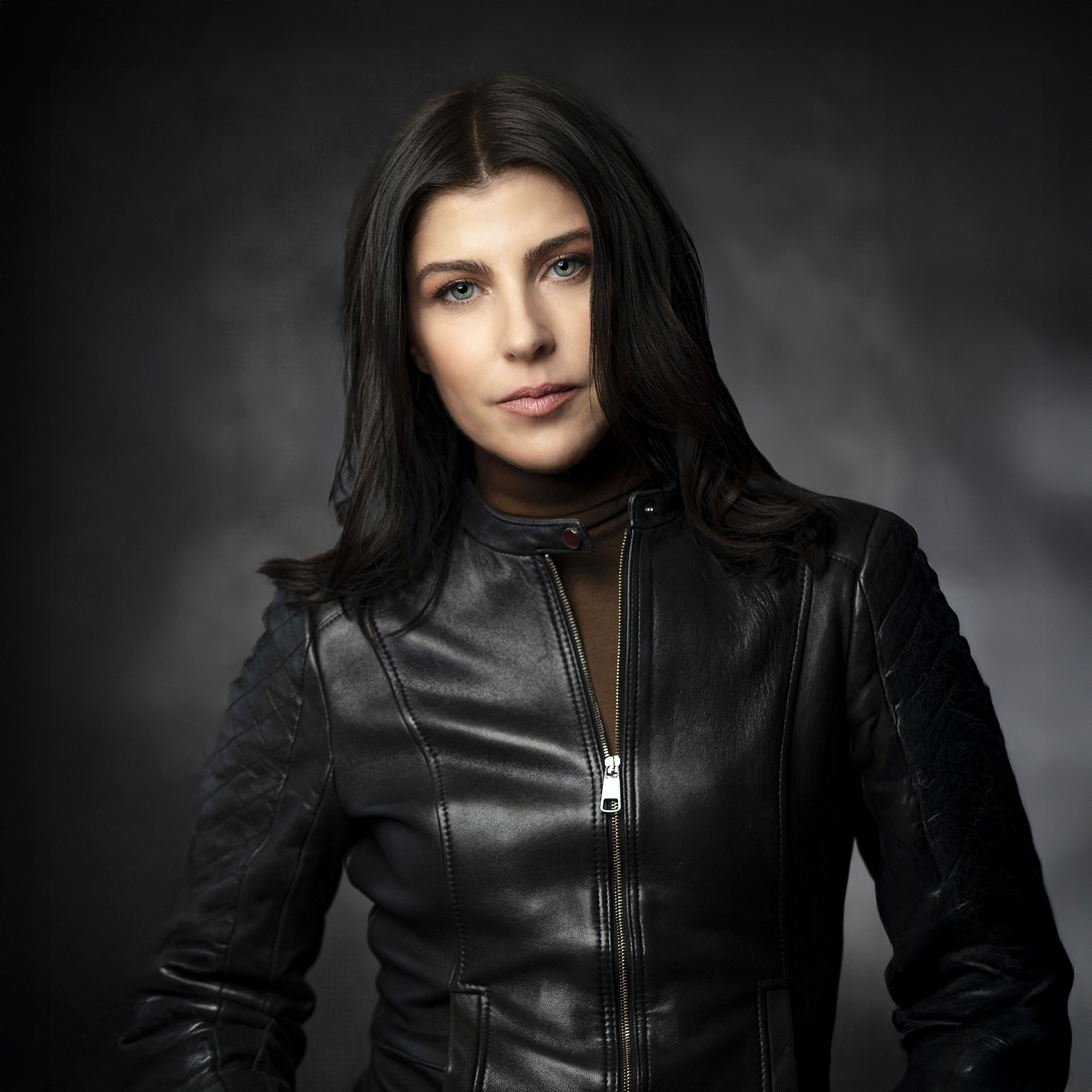
- Even in 2023
- Born: Geula Even; 15 June 1972 (age 54); Haifa, Israel
- Occupation: journalist
- Spouse(s): Amit Ovrakovitz (m. 1992; div. 2012) Gideon Sa'ar (m. 2013)
- Children: 5

Geula Even-Sa'ar (née Even, Hebrew: גאולה אבן-סער; born 15 June 1972) is an Israeli journalist, radio and television presenter. She hosted the programs "The World This Morning" on Channel 13; "Good Morning Israel" and "Yoman" on Channel 1. She later hosted the evening news bulletin, the news magazine "The Week" and the daily current affairs and interview program "Evening Evening" on Kan 11 until her retirement in December 2018.

== Media career ==
Geula Even-Sa'ar hosted Good Morning Israel and Yoman on Channel 1 and was one of the main newscasters on Channel 11 (Kan).

In 2018, Even resigned her job as news anchor prior to the political come-back of her husband. In 2021 she went on unpaid leave from Channel 11 ahead of Israel's national elections.

In 2024, Even-Sa'ar competed in the 3rd season of 'Dancing with the Stars' Israel, where she was eliminated third (out of 21), before reaching the live show stage.

== Personal life ==
Even-Sa'ar was married for about 20 years to Amit Ovrakovitz, who was her partner during her military service. The couple had three children. In 2012 they divorced. In 2013, she married Israeli politician Gideon Sa'ar. They have a son and a daughter together.

== See also ==
- Women of Israel
- Israeli media
