= Hind Rajab Foundation =

EU-based human rights organization

- Named after: Hind Rajab
- Founded: September 24, 2024; 2 years ago
- Founders: Dyab Abou Jahjah and Karim Hassoun
- Registration no.: 1013306540
- Headquarters: Brussels, Belgium
- Website: www.hindrajabfoundation.org

The Hind Rajab Foundation (HRF) is the legal arm of the March 30 Movement, a non-profit organization established in 2024 and based in Brussels, Belgium. The HRF's mission is to address and challenge what it describes as Israeli impunity concerning war crimes and human rights violations in Palestine, particularly in the Gaza Strip. The foundation is named in honor of Hind Rajab, a five-year-old Palestinian girl from the Gaza Strip who was killed during the Israeli invasion of the Gaza Strip by the Israel Defense Forces, who also killed six members of her family and two paramedics coming to her rescue.

== Leadership ==
The foundation is headed by Dyab Abou Jahjah and Karim Hassoun. Abou Jahjah is a Belgian-Lebanese political activist and writer. He is the founder and former leader of the Arab European League (AEL), a Pan-Arabist movement that supports the interests of Muslim immigrants in Europe. Hassoun is a Belgian-Lebanese political activist who has served as the chair of the AEL since 2005.

In a January 2025 interview with Amy Goodman on Democracy Now, Goodman asked how the HRF would compare its activities with that of the Simon Wiesenthal Center, to which Abou Jahjah responded: "the Simon Wiesenthal Center is something - I mean, it's humbling to compare us to them. They have done great work in the chase against Nazi criminals after the Holocaust, which was instrumental in upholding these principles that we are trying to uphold today.... we are totally identical to them. We operate the same way. We think the same way".

== Legal actions ==
=== International Criminal Court ===
In October 2024, HRF submitted a complaint to the International Criminal Court (ICC), urging the swift issuance of warrants for Israeli Prime Minister Benjamin Netanyahu and Defense Minister Yoav Gallant, holding them accountable for alleged war crimes in Gaza, as well as against the entire 749 Combat Engineering battalion of the Israel Defense Forces (IDF). According to the organization's lawyer Haroon Raza, the group's goal is "to have everyone who is directly or indirectly responsible for war crimes and genocide in Gaza prosecuted and eventually behind bars". As of March 2025, the HRF has identified and submitted the names of 1,000 Israeli soldiers to the ICC, while also pursuing legal cases in several countries, including Argentina, Belgium, Brazil, Cyprus, France, Germany, Nepal, the Netherlands, Romania, Sri Lanka, Thailand, and the UK.

On 3 May 2025, the HRF claimed that it had identified the commander of the battalion that had killed Hind as Lieutenant Colonel Beni Aharon of the 401st Armored Brigade and filed a war crimes complaint against him with the International Criminal Court.

=== Government officials ===
In December 2024, the HRF filed a complaint with the Belgian government against Colonel Moshe Tetro, Israel's incoming military attaché in Brussels, accusing him of responsibility for implementing a policy of starvation in Gaza, and of attacking hospitals.

Israeli Diaspora Affairs Minister Amichai Chikli cancelled a planned trip to the European Parliament in Brussels in January 2025 amid legal action initiated by the HRF. The Israeli Prime Minister's Office cited "specific security warnings" and advice from security agencies as the reason. Chikli, responsible for combating antisemitism, claimed Brussels had become "unsafe for Jews and Israelis". However, HRF accused him of evading accountability, asserting the cancellation aimed to avoid potential arrest over alleged war crimes, not genuine safety concerns. Belgian authorities noted Chikli lacked diplomatic immunity as his visit was unofficial and he risked the possibility of arrest.

HRF urged Italian authorities to arrest Israeli General Ghassan Alian, head of COGAT (Coordinator of Government Activities in the Territories), for alleged genocide and war crimes during his reported visit to Rome. The requests were submitted to the ICC and Italian authorities. The HRF accused him of enforcing Gaza's total blockade post-October-2023, with the Foundation saying that he weaponized famine by cutting food, water, and medical supplies, as well as targeting hospitals and infrastructure. Italy had denied his inclusion in Foreign Minister Gideon Saar's delegation, while Israel confirmed his visit had occurred separately. United Nations (UN) Special Rapporteur on the occupied Palestinian territories, Francesca Albanese, writing on X (formerly Twitter), supported the HRF's efforts to hold Alian accountable for alleged war crimes. Noting his potential imminent departure from Italy, she described the need for stronger global legal networks to swiftly address suspects of international crimes.

In April 2025, the HRF along with the Global Legal Action Network and International Centre of Justice for Palestinians wrote to the UK attorney general to apply for an arrest warrant for Israeli Foreign Minister Gideon Sa'ar. This came after Sa'ar met with UK Foreign Secretary David Lammy in London. HRF claims that Sa'ar is responsible for the attack on Kamal Adwan hospital and the detention of Hussam Abu Safiya. The British attorney general rejected the request.

The President of Israel, Isaac Herzog, was invited by the Australian Government to visit Australia from 8 to 12 February, 2026 to meet with members of the Australian Jewish community in the wake of the 2025 Bondi Beach shooting. The HRF, along with the Jewish Council of Australia and Australian National Imams Council, co-signed a statement asking the Albanese government to ban Israeli President Isaac Herzog from visiting the country, and to commence a criminal investigation against Herzog under Australian law.

=== Individual soldiers ===
In December 2024, the HRF filed a complaint with Chile's Public Prosecutor's Office, calling for the arrest of an Israeli soldier and member of the Israeli Combat Engineering Battalion allegedly involved in genocide, crimes against humanity, and war crimes in Gaza. The HRF argued that Chile's commitment to the Rome Statute and its national laws obligates the country to prosecute such crimes. In response, the Metropolitan Regional Prosecutor's Office initiated an investigation. Hugo Gutiérrez, HRF's legal advisor, emphasized Chile's responsibility to act in accordance with international law. Local prosecutors cited video evidence from his Instagram account, showing him participating in the destruction of civilian infrastructure in Gaza, and "his role in the deliberate demolition of neighborhoods, cultural sites, and essential facilities".

In December 2024, the HRF filed a complaint against an active-duty IDF soldier traveling in Sri Lanka, linking his social media posts to alleged war crimes in Gaza. The HRF notified the ICC and Interpol, and appealed to Sri Lankan authorities, demanding his arrest over the killing of a Palestinian civilian in Gaza. Following intervention by Israeli authorities, the soldier left Sri Lanka.

In December 2024, the HRF formally requested Thai authorities detain an Israeli soldier who they accused of committing war crimes, including destroying civilian homes in Gaza and using a school for military purposes.

In January 2025, the HRF filed a case against an IDF soldier who was vacationing in Brazil at the time. The HRF accused him of demolishing a residential block in Gaza outside of combat. Facing potential arrest, the soldier fled to Argentina with help from the Israeli Foreign Ministry, which facilitated his and his family's "quick and secure exit from Brazil." Subsequently, the HRF filed a legal case against him in Argentina. After successfully departing from Argentina and returning to Israel, the soldier expressed his surprise, stating, "They turned it from one house into 500 pages; they thought I'd murdered thousands of children, and who knows what."

In January 2025, the HRF filed a lawsuit in Sweden against an Israeli sniper from Battalion 932 of the Nahal Brigade for war crimes, crimes against humanity, and genocide during Israel's war on Gaza. They accused him of directly targeting civilians, destroying homes, attacking medical facilities, and advocating for the mass killing and expulsion of Palestinians. Evidence included his social media posts, eyewitness testimonies, journalist reports, and UN documentation.

The HRF demanded a war crimes investigation and arrest for an Israeli sergeant of the Givati Brigade under Spanish law and international treaties, including the Geneva Conventions and the Rome Statute. He was accused of genocide, crimes against humanity, and war crimes during the Gaza military operation, allegedly committed between January and March 2024. These include using civilian homes for military purposes, attacking UN marked schools with grenade launchers, demolishing civilian homes in Khan Yunis, and displacing thousands of Gazans. The complaint also implicates other platoon members.

In March 2025, the HRF filed a complaint against a German-Israeli dual national and IDF tank commander in the Barak Brigade. The complaint alleges "the deliberate targeting of civilian infrastructure, indiscriminate shelling of residential neighborhoods, and the glorification of destruction in urban areas". However, the German prosecution did not open an investigation.

In May 2025, HRF filed a legal complaint in Peru that led to the opening of a criminal investigation against an Israeli national accused of involvement in the genocide in Gaza. The complaint was submitted by Julio César Arbizu González, a prominent Peruvian human rights lawyer and legal counsel to the Foundation. The individual under investigation served as a combat engineering soldier in the Israeli military and is alleged to have played a direct role in the systematic destruction of civilian neighborhoods in the Gaza Strip during the 2023–2024 military offensive. His name has not been publicly disclosed, though the Foundation released an image and video purportedly showing him.

In July 2025, HRF filed a criminal complaint with Portuguese authorities against an Israeli sniper, urging his arrest for alleged war crimes committed during Israel's Gaza offensive. The NGO claims the sniper, affiliated with the Israeli army's 8114th Battalion, participated in unlawful killings of civilians, including during a ceasefire, and shared incriminating content on Instagram. Recently spotted in Lisbon, he is accused of involvement in the deadly "Netzarim corridor" operation. The Foundation called on Portugal to act under universal jurisdiction principles, arguing that Portuguese authorities have the legal duty to detain war crimes suspects found on Portuguese territory.

On 21 July 2025, following a complaint from the HRF, two Israeli soldiers attending the Tomorrowland festival in Belgium were questioned by police and later released.

On 25 July 2025, HFR filed a formal war crimes complaint with authorities in Cyprus against an Israeli paratrooper from the IDF's 101st Battalion. The complaint alleges his direct involvement in serious violations of international law during Israel's military operations in Gaza, including deliberate attacks on civilian infrastructure, forced evacuations of protected persons from Nasser Hospital, and the destruction of educational institutions. The Foundation also cited social media posts in which he appeared to glorify the destruction. Based on principles of universal jurisdiction, the organization called on Cyprus to arrest him, prevent his departure, and initiate legal proceedings.

In October 2026, the Hind Rajab Foundation submitted an urgent petition to the U.S. Department of Justice, calling for the investigation, arrest, and prosecution of Sean Glass, who is in the United States.

=== Other cases ===
Following the November 2024 riots in Amsterdam the HRF filed complaints against the Maccabi Tel Aviv F.C. supporters for chanting genocidal slogans, such as "Fuck the Arabs", and "There are no schools in Gaza because there are no children left", which the Foundation described as genocidal rhetoric and incitement. HRF also filed complaints for vandalism of property including targeting of Palestinian symbols such as flags and assault on local citizens.

On 28 July 2025, the HRF filed a formal complaint with the War Crimes Unit of the British Metropolitan Police against the commander of Shayetet 13, the Israeli naval special forces unit that led the seizure of the Handala, a British-flagged aid ship. The complaint alleges that the vessel was intercepted in international waters, approximately 49 nautical miles off the coast of Gaza, while carrying unarmed civilians attempting to deliver humanitarian aid. The Foundation called for a criminal investigation into the operation and legal action against all Israeli military and government officials involved in authorizing or executing the raid.

Israeli comedian Guy Hochman was reported to have been detained at Toronto Pearson International Airport following actions by HRF.

== Reactions ==
=== Israel ===
In early 2025, following the announcement that a court in Brazil would investigate an Israeli soldier visiting the country at the time for war crimes, Abou Jahjah was threatened on social media by Israeli Minister of Diaspora Affairs Amichai Chikli, who wrote "Hello, our human rights activist. Watch your pager", which Belgian media suggested was a reference to the 2024 Lebanon electronic device attacks.

Israeli opposition leader Yair Lapid criticized the Israeli government after Vagdani was forced to flee Brazil to avoid arrest; Lapid called it a diplomatic failure, blaming weak international advocacy and lack of legal protections, which leave IDF soldiers fearing arrest abroad. He also urged a state inquiry and stronger public diplomacy to prevent such incidents. Israeli Foreign Minister Gideon Sa'ar responded to Lapid by saying: "[...] what we are witnessing is a systematic and anti-Semitic campaign aimed at denying Israel's right to self-defense. Countless international actors and many countries are complicit in this".

In response to the HRF's efforts, the IDF announced that as of January 2025, it would no longer identify its forces by name in media. Moms Up, a mothers' group representing Israeli soldiers, wrote to Prime Minister Benjamin Netanyahu and the IDF Chief of Staff following the case in Brazil, saying: "We see you as the sole responsible party for removing the legal risk facing our children".

In 2025, Drop Site News and Misbar reported that the Israeli government was targeting the HRF in a Google Ads campaign in an effort to discredit it. The campaign included a government report that characterized the HRF as having "deep connections to extremist ideologies and terrorist organisations, raising serious concerns about its true motives."

=== Others ===
In January 2025, journalist Amy Goodman of Democracy Now! compared the HRF's work to that of the Simon Wiesenthal Center, which tracked Nazi war criminals. That December, American progressive magazine The Nation included the HRF in its list of "Progressives Fighting for Our Democracy", and stated, "HRF brings ingenuity and a diligent work ethic to the project of encouraging countries to prosecute these criminals at the national level. The foundation has assembled an impressive team of researchers to track IDF activity on the ground, identifying where units are operating and which international laws they've violated."

== See also ==
- Simon Wiesenthal Center
- List of people indicted in the International Criminal Court
