= Ayat (restaurant) =

Restaurant in New York City, US

Coordinates: 40°37′27″N 74°01′51″W

Ayat is a Palestinian restaurant that opened in 2020 in Bay Ridge, Brooklyn. Abdul Elenani founded Ayat at the height of the COVID-19 pandemic to share their culture and teach others about Palestinian cuisine. Since its first location in Brooklyn, the chain has opened seven restaurants in Manhattan and New Jersey, with new locations planned in Washington DC, Dallas and Philadelphia. Since its founding, Ayat has earned a place in the Michelin Guide, and The Brooklyn Paper has named Ayat as one of the "Twenty-one Brooklyn Eateries" in the New York Times 100 Best Restaurants list.

== Founders ==
Founders Ayat Masoud and Abdul Elenani, wife and husband, were not always in the restaurant business. Ayat Masoud is an immigration lawyer by training and has an established law firm, Masoud Law Firm. Based in Brooklyn, the law firm focuses on providing services to the Muslim community through applying the principles of Islamic Jurisprudence. Abdul Elenani, the son of Egyptian immigrants, had a background in contracting and hospitality.

The founding of Ayat was the result of Abdul's and Ayat's passion for food, along with their desire to share Palestinian culture and heritage. Other than leading her law firm, Ayat has a deep passion for cooking. Abdul created the bistro in honor of Ayat's passion, with the aim of the restaurant to create and share authentic, home-style Palestinian soul food, rooted in their family's recipes.

== Cuisine ==
Ayat is a Palestinian bistro serving traditional Palestinian cuisine infused with shared-plate, family-style hospitality. All food served is halal, and several locations include bilingual menus of Arabic and English.

The menu includes classics such as mansaf, a lamb stew prepared with fermented yogurt; maqluba, an upside-down layered dish of chicken, rice, and vegetables; and m'sakhan, consisting of sumac-spiced onions, pine nuts, and chicken on taboon-style bread. The restaurant also offers mezze including hummus, baba ghanoush, and stuffed grape leaves, along with Fattat dishes that layer meat or chicken with rice, chickpeas, yogurt or tahini, and crispy pita.

== Ambiance ==
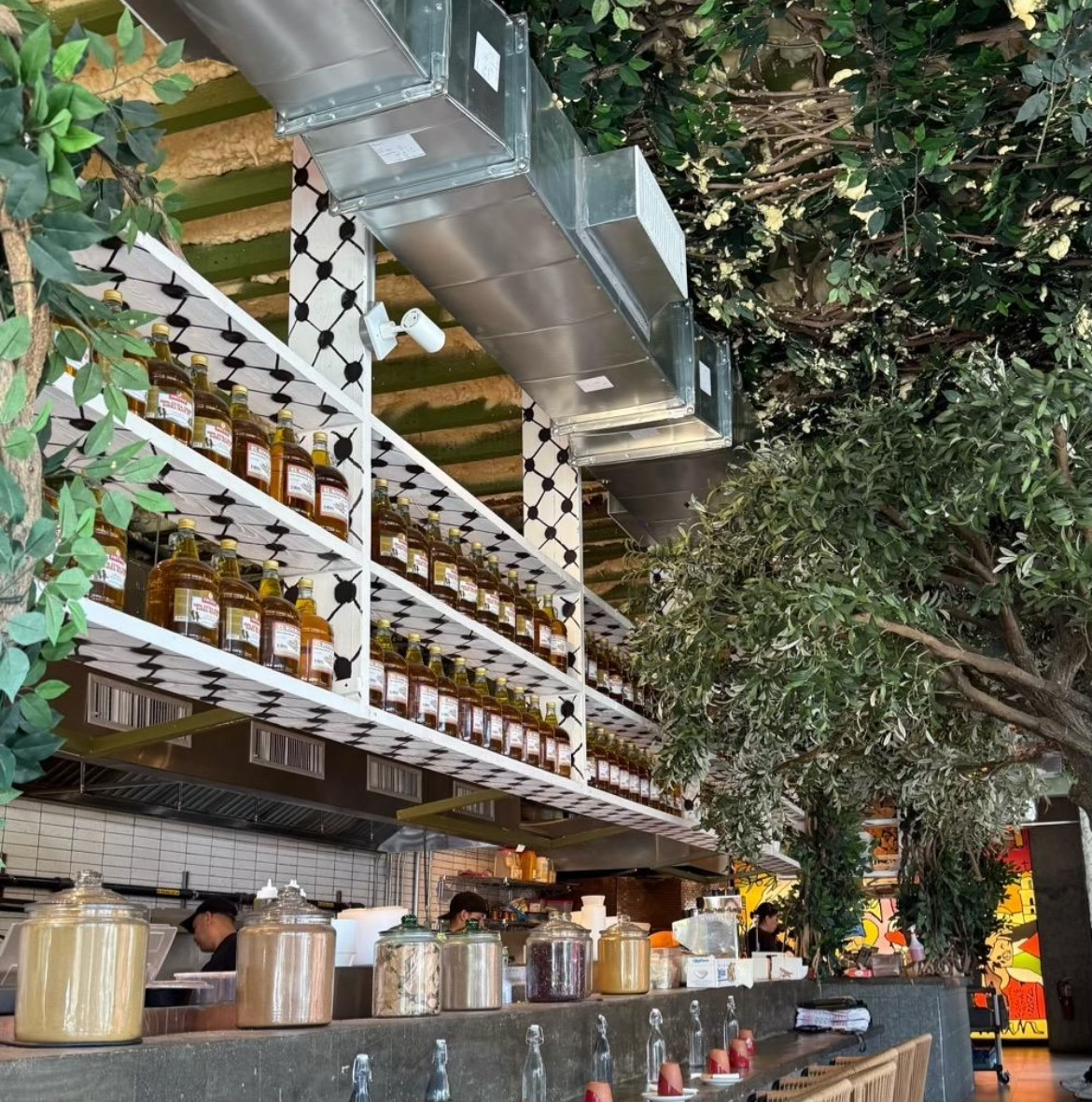
Ayat interior, Bushwick

Ayat's ambiance is designed to evoke the warmth and intimacy of a traditional Palestinian home while blending contemporary Brooklyn dining culture. Their Bushwick location particularly features a glass facade accented by vines, trees, and string lights. Inside, the walls are covered in murals where there is an open viewing of the kitchen, contributing to the communal atmosphere. There are multiple artistic elements in the restaurant's design that pay homage to Palestinian art, such a keffiyeh pattern on the tiles.

== Pro-Palestine activity ==
Since opening, Ayat has become a cultural and political center for Palestinian advocacy in the tristate area. All of their locations pay a homage to Palestine, not only paying a homage to their homeland but have especially played a role in securing their solidarity to Palestine during the ongoing genocide in Gaza. The restaurant's political messaging, through its decor, signage, and menu, has now drawn national attention. In late 2023, Ayat came under fire for including one of the Palestinian slogans, "From the River to the Sea", in its menu as a dish. Although many supported Ayat in this matter, as a non-violent call for justice, others in the media characterized this as an open act of genocide. The couple received severe backlash online from the Anti-Defamation League (ADL) and the American Jewish Committee, arguing that the menu was inherently antisemitic. Abdul and Ayat explained that these phrases were intended to express Palestinian identity and calls for liberation, not violence.

Despite this pressure, Ayat has expanded its outreach into other communities. In January 2024, the restaurant hosted a free Shabbat dinner at its Ditmas Park, Brooklyn location that drew over 1,300 attendees. The evening was promoted as an opportunity to foster a sense of community between cultural groups amidst a time of tension. Attendees included local residents, a mix of Jewish and Arab New Yorkers, and members of anti-Zionist Jewish groups. For the dinner itself, the owners catered Palestinian cuisine (such as baba ganoush, hummus, and mansaf) and hired Jewish caterers to provide more kosher food option. The event cost the restaurant between $30,000 to $40,000 and did not accept any donations.

Outside of events hosted at their restaurants, the couple has also extended their political commitments into supporting local efforts focused on Palestinian liberation. For instance, Ayat is opening a new location in the Upper West Side and has promised free food to help students protesting in support of Palestine.
