= Hind Under Siege =

2025 Jordanian short film by Naji Salameh

- Film poster
- Directed by: Naji Salameh
- Screenplay by: Aida Al Amercani
- Produced by: Aida Al Amercani
- Starring: Sofia Asir; Elina Askar; Dia Harb
- Cinematography: Ahmad Jalboush
- Edited by: Naji Salameh
- Music by: Suad Bushnaq
- Production companies: Fajrona Film; Iguana Production House
- Release date: 27 October 2025 (Gaza International Festival for Women's Cinema)
- Running time: 24 minutes
- Country: Jordan
- Language: Arabic

Hind Under Siege is a 2025 Jordanian biographical war drama short film directed and edited by Naji Salameh and written by Aida Al Amercani. It tells the true story of 5-year-old Palestinian girl Hind Rajab, who was killed by the Israeli army in the Gaza Strip during the Gaza war in January 2024. The film premiered at the inaugural Gaza International Festival for Women's Cinema on 27 October 2025, where it won the Jury Award for Best Narrative Short Film.

== Cast ==
- Elina Askar as Hind Rajab
- Sofia Asir as Rana Al-Faqih
- Dia Harb as Omar Alqam
- Diana Rahmeh
- Ahmad Srour
- Nagham Rasheed
- Ahmad Ayyash
- Shatha Elayan
- Moeen Masoud

== Production ==
=== Development ===
Hind Under Siege was directed and edited by Jordanian-Palestinian filmmaker Naji Salameh, with a screenplay written by Palestinian-Jordanian singer Aida Al Amercani, who also produced the film, which was funded by Jordan's Royal Film Commission and produced by Fajrona Film in association with Iguana Production House and the support from Slate Film Services, Moon Rock and the Palestine Red Crescent Society. The film tells the true story of the killing of 5-year-old Palestinian girl Hind Rajab, who was killed by the Israeli army in the Gaza Strip during the Gaza war in January 2024. Rajab's real voice is featured in the film. The film has the support of Rajab's mother.

Omar Alaqam, a member of the Palestine Red Crescent Society crew in Ramallah, who was an eyewitness and participant in the first call with Hind's cousin, served as consultant, liaison coordinator and was also present on set.

=== Filming ===
Filming took place in Amman, Jordan in December 2024. Shooting locations included the Ahl Al Azm city in the south of Amman, and the Jordanian Media Institute, where the scenes at the offices of the Palestine Red Crescent Society were filmed. The scenes at Hind's house took place in an old house in the Al-Weibdeh neighborhood in the center of Amman, where scenes of shelling and escape were filmed.

On 29 January 2025, Fajrona Film shared on their social media a 2-minute video featuring behind-the-scenes footage from the film.

== Release ==
Hind Under Siege had its first private screening held by Fajrona Film in Amman, Jordan on 6 October 2025, under the patronage of Prince Ali bin Hussein, and in collaboration with Jordan's Royal Film Commission. Princess Rym Ali and the Palestinian Red Crescent team from Ramallah also attended the screening.

The film premiered at the inaugural Gaza International Festival for Women's Cinema on 27 October 2025. The film will be screened at the Leeds Palestinian Film Festival in the section Women, Film & Resistance in Gaza on 27 November 2025.

== Accolades ==
Award / Film Festival	Date of ceremony	Category	Recipient(s)	Result	Ref.
Gaza International Festival for Women's Cinema	31 October 2025	Golden Orange – Best Narrative Short Film	Naji Salameh	Nominated	
Gaza International Festival for Women's Cinema	31 October 2025	Jury Award – Best Narrative Short Film	Naji Salameh	Won	

== See also ==
- Close Your Eyes Hind, 2025 Dutch short film about the killing of Hind Rajab
- The Voice of Hind Rajab, 2025 Tunisian feature film about the killing of Hind Rajab
