= Close Your Eyes Hind =

2025 Dutch short film by Amir Zaza

- Film poster
- Directed by: Amir Zaza
- Screenplay by: Amir Zaza
- Produced by: Amir Zaza; Abdul Rahman Abdulfattah
- Starring: Patel Akkad; Sundus Al Bashash; Mohamad Akkad
- Cinematography: Tonko Bossen
- Edited by: Amir Zaza
- Music by: Rami Al Maghrbel
- Production companies: Mattar Productions; Al Jazeera 360
- Release dates: 18 June 2025 (Arnhem); 6 November 2025 (Netherlands)
- Running time: 32 minutes
- Country: Netherlands
- Language: Arabic
- Budget: €500,000

Close Your Eyes Hind is a 2025 Dutch biographical war drama short film written, directed, edited, and produced by Amir Zaza, based on the killing of Hind Rajab. It stars Patel Akkad as Hind Rajab, a five-year-old Palestinian girl who was killed by the Israel Defense Forces during the Israeli invasion of the Gaza Strip on 29 January 2024. The film made its world premiere at a benefit screening at the Focus Filmtheater Arnhem in the Netherlands on 18 June 2025, and was broadcast on television by NPO 2 on 6 November 2025. It won the Golden Calf for Best Short Film at the 2025 Netherlands Film Festival.

== Cast ==
- Patel Akkad as Hind Rajab
- Sundus Al Bashash as Layan
- Maya Janer as Hind's mother
- Mohammad Akkad as Uncle Bashar
- Raghad Shannon as Aunt
- Jolie Alkillesly as Raghad
- Sari Alkillesly as Mohammed
- Khalid Slayman as Soldier
- Jasminka Hidanovic as Soldier
- Nour Alsayed as Soldier
- Sara Alestwani as Red Crescent (voice)
- Muhammad Tawfiq al-Abd (voice)

== Production ==
=== Development ===
Close Your Eyes Hind was written, directed, edited, and produced by Syrian-Dutch filmmaker Amir Zaza, and is based on the Killing of Hind Rajab, a five-year-old Palestinian girl who was killed by the Israel Defense Forces during the Israeli invasion of the Gaza Strip on 29 January 2024, which also killed six of her family members and two paramedics coming to her rescue. Zaza produced the film along with Abdul Rahman Abdulfattah and Mattar Productions, in partnership with Al Jazeera's digital platform Al Jazeera 360. Tonko Bossen was the director of photography, Klaudia Schenkels was responsible for production design, Quincy Vlijtig worked as sound designer, and the score was composed by Rami Al Maghrbel. The film had the support of Rajab's mother.

Zaza followed the news about Rajab's death, and the image of her smiling face and the wreath of flowers on her head (from a photo that circulated at the time) haunted him in his dreams. 10 years prior to working on the film, Zaza had fled from Syria to the Netherlands to escape the war. He later studied at the Netherlands Film Academy and became a filmmaker. "I am not a military and not a politician. I'm a filmmaker. I had to do something from my position," Zaza said about his decision to make Close Your Eyes Hind. Zaza called his college friend, a cameraman, and said, "I'm making a movie about Gaza and we're going to work on it unpaid, are you going to join us?", and his friend agreed, along with three other people, although it was difficult to get funding for the film at the time because even the mention of the word "Gaza" was enough to stop a project and only Israel's side was heard. Zaza then started working on the screenplay, collected all the articles about Rajab's death, and studied them. He also contacted Rajab's mother and other members of her family, as well as the employee from the Palestine Red Crescent Society who spoke to Rajab on the phone and witnessed her last moments.

For 10 months, Zaza gathered volunteers to work on the film. It started with 4 people and grew into a team of about 40 volunteers. Zaza was also allowed to freely use a professional studio in Amsterdam for the shooting. However, Zaza still needed a lot of money for set decoration, costumes, visual effects, and transport. He approached around 13 production companies to no success, then turned to organizations that stood up for the Palestinian people. Some time later, he received the first 2000 euros from one organization, followed by smaller contributions from others, but that was still not enough. Zaza then decided to crowdfund the project. They needed around 17,000 euros to fund the film, but ended up raising 25,000 euros. Over 600 people contributed to the crowdfunding campaign, mainly Dutch people, some of whom were of Arab origin.

Zaza opted for a work of fiction based on the true story of Hind Rajab rather than a documentary. Some scenes, such as the phone calls, were filmed exactly as they happened. Zaza said he wanted to make the viewer feel as if they were sitting next to Rajab in the car and to sympathize with her thoughts and feelings. "Did she maybe dance or sing in the car before this tragedy? Was she hopeful? Scared? Was she crying? What did she think about death?", he explained. Zaza said that Rajab symbolizes all the children in Gaza killed by the Israeli army since October 2023: "Hind has become a symbol for all those children who called for help while the world looked away."

The film's total production budget was €500,000. Zaza said that half of the proceeds will go to Rajab's family, who are still in Gaza and cannot afford to leave.

=== Filming ===
Principal photography took place at ReadySet Studios in Amsterdam in December 2024. The environment around the car was recreated in 3D.

== Release ==
Close Your Eyes Hind premiered at a benefit screening at the Focus Filmtheater Arnhem in Gelderland on 18 June 2025. It later premiered in competition at the Netherlands Film Festival on 28 September 2025, and was made available online on the festival's website on 1 October 2025. The film made its international premiere in competition at the El Gouna Film Festival in Egypt on 20 October 2025. It was broadcast on television for the first time by Dutch TV channel NPO 2 on 6 November 2025, and the following day, it was made available to watch online for free on NPO 3's website, and also on NPO Start, and on Al Jazeera 360.

== Accolades ==
Award / Festival	Date of ceremony	Category	Recipient(s)	Result	Ref.
Netherlands Film Festival	3 October 2025	Golden Calf for Best Short Film	Amir Zaza	Won	
Netherlands Film Festival	3 October 2025	Golden Calf for Best Leading Performance in a Short Film	Patel Akkad	Nominated	
El Gouna Film Festival	24 October 2025	Best Short Film	Amir Zaza	Nominated	
Vers Film Festival	15 March 2026	Best Short Film	Amir Zaza	Won	
Vers Film Festival	15 March 2026	Best Screenplay	Amir Zaza	Won	
Vers Film Festival	15 March 2026	Audience Award	Amir Zaza	Won	
Bali International Film Festival	5 June 2026	Special Mention - Short Narrative	Amir Zaza	Won	
Dutch Directors Guild Awards	9 June 2026	Best Short Fiction	Amir Zaza	Won	
Durban International Film Festival	2 August 2026	Best Short Film	Amir Zaza	Won	

== See also ==
- The Voice of Hind Rajab, 2025 Tunisian feature film about the killing of Hind Rajab
- Hind Under Siege, 2025 Jordanian short film about the killing of Hind Rajab
