= Tel al-Hawa =

Neighborhood in Gaza, Palestine

Tel al-Hawa تل الهوا
- Neighborhood
- Tel al-Islam
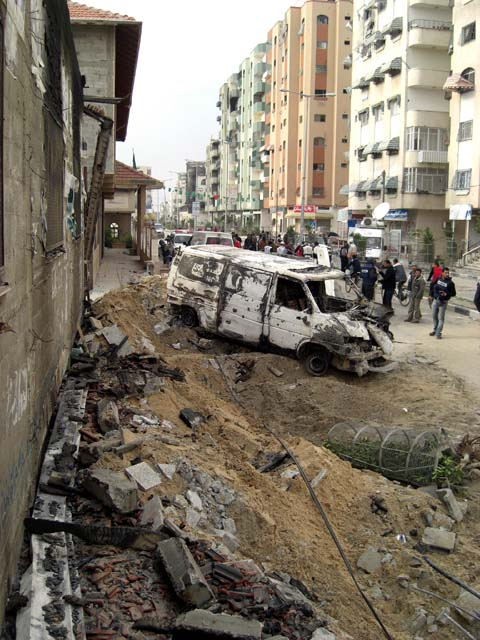
- Tel al-Hawa during the Israeli bombing of Al-Quds Hospital, January 19, 2009
- Interactive map of Tel al-Hawa
- Coordinates: 31°30′30.97″N 34°26′4.5″E
- Country: Palestine
- Governorate: Gaza Governorate
- City: Gaza
- Time zone: UTC+2 (EET)
  - Summer (DST): +3

Tel al-Hawa (Arabic: تل الهوا, "Hill of the Wind") is a neighborhood in the southern part of the Palestinian city of Gaza. Incorporated by the Palestinian National Authority in the late 1990s, Tel al-Hawa is one of the more affluent areas of the city. It contains the Islamic University in Gaza and the Interior Ministry of the Gaza government.

== History ==
Tel al-Hawa was formerly the headquarters of the Preventive Security Service, until Hamas took over the Gaza Strip in 2007 and turned it into a police station. After capturing the neighborhood, Hamas militiamen had it renamed to "Tel al-Islam". The Doghmush clan held journalist Alan Johnston in Tel al-Hawa between March and July 2007, until Hamas secured his release.

The neighborhood was severely damaged in the 2008–09 Gaza War, codenamed "Operation Cast Lead" by Israel. It was the scene of some of the fiercest fighting of the war. Dozens of Hamas fighters were killed or wounded, and a dozen IDF soldiers were also killed and wounded. At least 12 civilians were killed.

=== Battle of Tel al-Hawa ===
Tel al-Hawa was the site of significant Israeli military activity during the Israeli invasion of the Gaza Strip during the Gaza war. On November 4, 2023, Al-Qassam Brigades claimed to have destroyed an Israeli tank that had entered Tel al-Hawa.

On February 10, 2024, the body of Hind Rajab, a six-year-old who was trapped in a car with all her relatives killed and who had called the Palestinian Red Crescent ambulance to find her, was found dead in Tel al-Hawa along with the two drivers of the ambulance that were dispatched to find her.

On July 8, 2024, there were reports of a large-scale Israeli invasion into Tel al-Hawa, beginning with a large wave of airstrikes followed by a ground offensive. After the IDF withdrew, rescuers in Gaza found 60 dead bodies scattered across the neighbourhood. They reported "there are bodies of entire families, there are also bodies inside a home of an entire family that was completely burned." Rescuers said that the Israeli army had set homes on fire before withdrawing and firefighters had to reach these buildings on foot.

In July 2024, despite being initially impeded by the Israeli military, civil defense forces uncovered more than 40 bodies trapped beneath collapsed buildings in the neighborhood after an Israeli retreat from the area; the military did not comment on the matter.

Abubaker Abed, reporting from Tel al-Hawa during the January 2025 Gaza war ceasefire period showed video of demolished residential apartment buildings, numerous destroyed fire engines, water tankers, and obliterated rescue equipment of the Gaza City Civil Defense Forces. He described the destruction he recorded there as "an attempt was made to annihilate the social fabric of life" in Tel al-Hawa.
