= List of ambassadors of Italy to Israel =

Coordinates: 32.062707°N 34.762801°E

Ambassador of Italy to Israel
- Ambasciatore d'Italia a Tel Aviv
- Emblem of Italy
- Incumbent; Sergio Barbanti since October 1, 2021
- Inaugural holder: Carlo Gasparini
- Formation: 1949

The Italian ambassador in Tel Aviv is the official representative of the Government in Rome to the Government of Israel.

== List of representatives ==
Diplomatic accreditation	Ambassador	Observations	List of prime ministers of Italy	List of presidents of Israel	Term end
May 19, 1949	Carlo Gasparini		Ferruccio Parri	Chaim Weizmann	1949
January 24, 1952	Raimondo Giustiniani		Ferruccio Parri	Chaim Weizmann	1952
December 2, 1953	Benedetto Capomazza di Campolattaro		Giuseppe Pella	Yitzhak Ben-Zvi	1958
March 11, 1958	Giovanni Revedin Di San Martino		Adone Zoli	Yitzhak Ben-Zvi	1962
March 25, 1964	Aldo Pierantoni		Giovanni Leone	Zalman Shazar	1969
March 2, 1969	Giuseppe Walter Maccotta		Giovanni Leone	Zalman Shazar	1971
June 20, 1971	Vittorio Cordero di Montezemolo		Emilio Colombo	Zalman Shazar	1973
July 10, 1974	Fausto Bacchetti		Aldo Moro	Ephraim Katzir	1978
October 5, 1979	Girolamo Nisio		Francesco Cossiga	Yitzhak Navon	1983
April 18, 1983	Corrado Taliani		Bettino Craxi	Chaim Herzog	1985
April 28, 1986	Giovanni Dominedò		Bettino Craxi	Chaim Herzog	1987
July 1, 1987	Alberto Leoncini Bartoli		Amintore Fanfani	Chaim Herzog	1991
February 24, 1991	Pier Luigi Rachele		Giulio Andreotti	Chaim Herzog	1995
March 9, 1995	Giuseppe Panocchia		Lamberto Dini	Ezer Weizman	1997
January 1, 1998	Gian Paolo Cavarai		Massimo D’Alema	Ezer Weizman	2002
March 1, 2002	Giulio Terzi di Sant'Agata		Silvio Berlusconi	Moshe Katsav	2004
June 1, 2004	Sandro De Bernardin	Accredited at July 21, 2004	Silvio Berlusconi	Moshe Katsav	September 17, 2008
September 17, 2008	Luigi Mattiolo		Silvio Berlusconi	Shimon Peres	August 20, 2012
August 20, 2012	Francesco Maria Talò		Mario Monti	Reuven Rivlin	August 4, 2017
June 22, 2017	Gianluigi Benedetti		Paolo Gentiloni	Reuven Rivlin	
October 1, 2021	Sergio Barbanti		Mario Draghi	Isaac Herzog	
