= Thirty-sixth government of Israel =

2021–22 coalition led by Naftali Bennett and Yair Lapid

Bennett–Lapid government
- 36th Cabinet of Israel

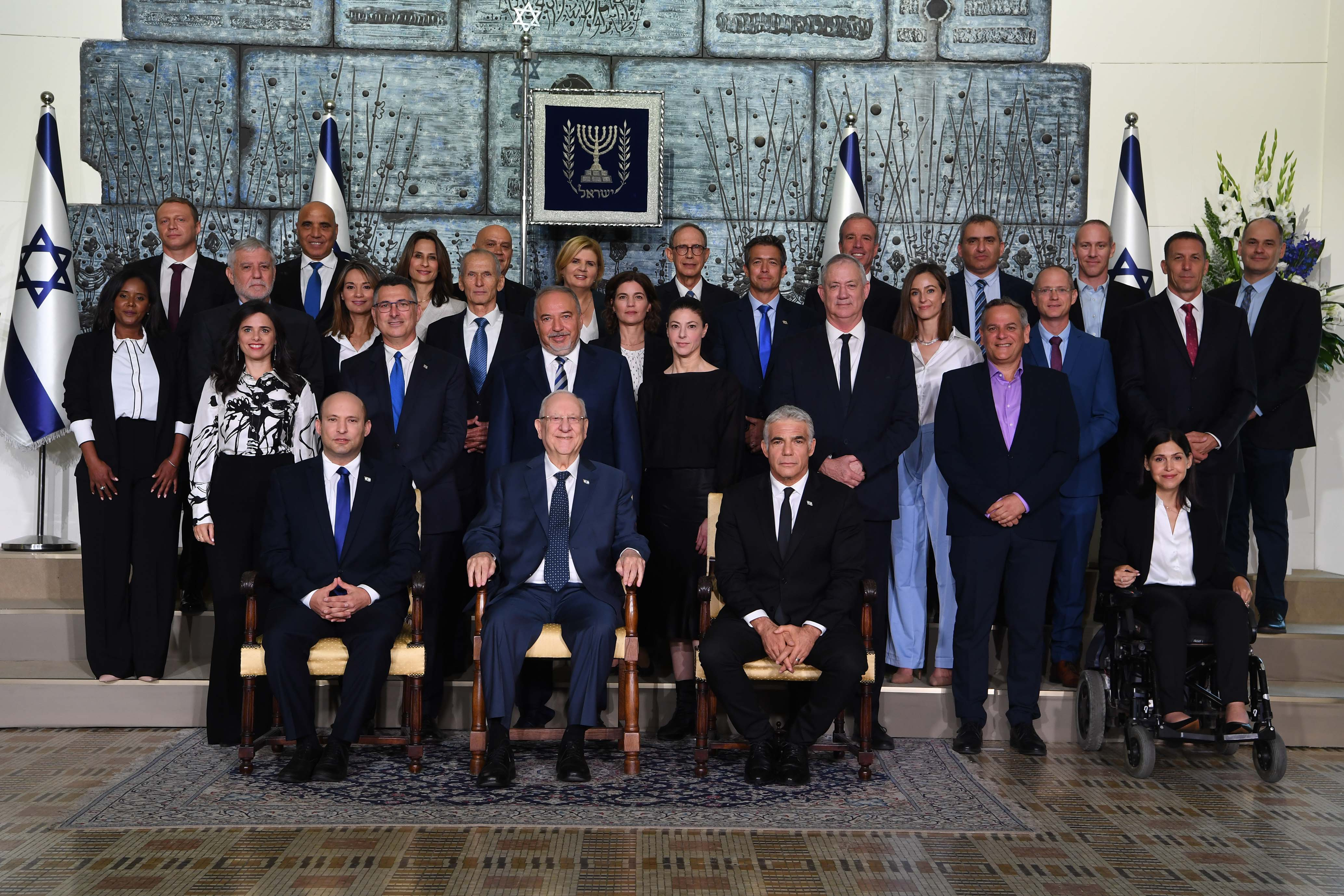
- Ministers of the Bennett–Lapid government with President Reuven Rivlin
- Date formed: 13 June 2021
- Date dissolved: 29 December 2022

People and organisations
- President: Reuven Rivlin; Isaac Herzog
- Prime minister: Naftali Bennett (2021–2022); Yair Lapid (July 2022–Dec 2022)
- Alt. prime minister: Yair Lapid (2021–2022); Naftali Bennett (July–Nov 2022)
- No. of ministers: 27
- Member parties: Yesh Atid; Blue and White; Yamina; Labor; Yisrael Beiteinu; New Hope; Meretz; Ra'am
- Status in legislature: Coalition; National unity; Rotation government; Minority government (2022)
- Opposition parties: Likud; Shas; United Torah Judaism; Religious Zionist; Joint List
- Opposition leader: Benjamin Netanyahu

History
- Incoming formation: 2019–2022 political crisis
- Election: 2021 Knesset election
- Legislature terms: 24th Knesset
- Predecessor: 35th government
- Successor: 37th government

The thirty-sixth government of Israel, or the Bennett–Lapid government, was the cabinet of Israel that was formed on 13 June 2021 after the 2021 Knesset elections. On 2 June 2021 a coalition agreement was signed between Yesh Atid, Blue and White, Yamina, the Labor Party, Yisrael Beiteinu, New Hope, Meretz, and Ra'am. The cabinet was succeeded by the thirty-seventh government of Israel, led by Benjamin Netanyahu, on 29 December 2022.

The government had two prime ministers during its existence. Namely, under a rotation agreement, Naftali Bennett of Yamina initially served as Prime Minister but ultimately ceded the position to Yair Lapid of Yesh Atid, after the coalition fell on 30 June 2022. Lapid became Prime Minister on 1 July 2022. Due to the collapse of the government, Lapid served as caretaker Prime Minister until elections were held on 1 November 2022.

Yamina and Yesh Atid became the fourth and fifth parties, respectively, to lead an Israeli government – following Mapai/Labor Party (1948–1977; 1984–1986; 1992–1996; 1999–2001), Herut/Likud (1977–1984; 1986–1992; 1996–1999; 2001–2005; 2009–2021), and Kadima (2005–2009).

The government was the first to include an independent Arab Israeli party as an official member of the governing coalition. It was Israel's second government, after the Netanyahu-Gantz rotation government, to function under an automatic and legally-binding system of rotation in the position of prime minister. The investiture vote in the Knesset was held on 13 June 2021. The Bennett-Lapid government was confirmed by a vote of 60 to 59, with one MK from Ra'am, Said al-Harumi, abstaining. Bennett was thus sworn in as Israel's 13th prime minister, with Lapid serving as alternate prime minister.

== Government formation ==
The 2021 election once more produced a hung Knesset, with neither the pro-Netanyahu right-wing bloc (Likud, Shas, United Torah Judaism, and Religious Zionist Party; with 52 seats) nor the ideologically diverse non-Arab anti-Netanyahu opposition (Yesh Atid, Blue and White, Labor Party, Yisrael Beiteinu, New Hope, and Meretz; with 51 seats) winning enough seats to form a new government outright (61 seats are needed for an absolute majority). This left the conservative Yamina and the two Arab political factions, the Joint List and Ra'am, as the potential kingmakers for a Knesset majority.

Yamina leader Naftali Bennett stated that his first preference was the formation of a right-wing government, while his second choice would be the establishment of a broader "national unity government", to avoid a fifth election in just over two years time. Even with the potential addition of Yamina, the pro-Netanyahu bloc would still have been short of an absolute majority by two seats. Namely, Gideon Sa'ar of the right-wing New Hope party had refused to enter into any coalition in which Netanyahu would remain prime minister, thus hindering the formation of a pure right-wing majority government. In addition, while Netanyahu had been open to limited forms of cooperation with Ra'am to put an end to the deadlock, the Religious Zionist Party ruled out being a part of any right-wing majority which would rely on the UAL's outside support.

=== April recommendations ===
President Reuven Rivlin met with all elected parties and received their recommendations for prime minister on 5 April 2021, and gave Prime Minister Benjamin Netanyahu the mandate on 6 April. This was the first time in Israel's history where there were recommendations for three candidates (Netanyahu, Yair Lapid, and Naftali Bennett), rather than two, after the legislative election. Netanyahu was given a mandate to form a new government by the end of 4 May, but he failed to form a government by the deadline.

Israeli government formation, April 2021
- April 2021
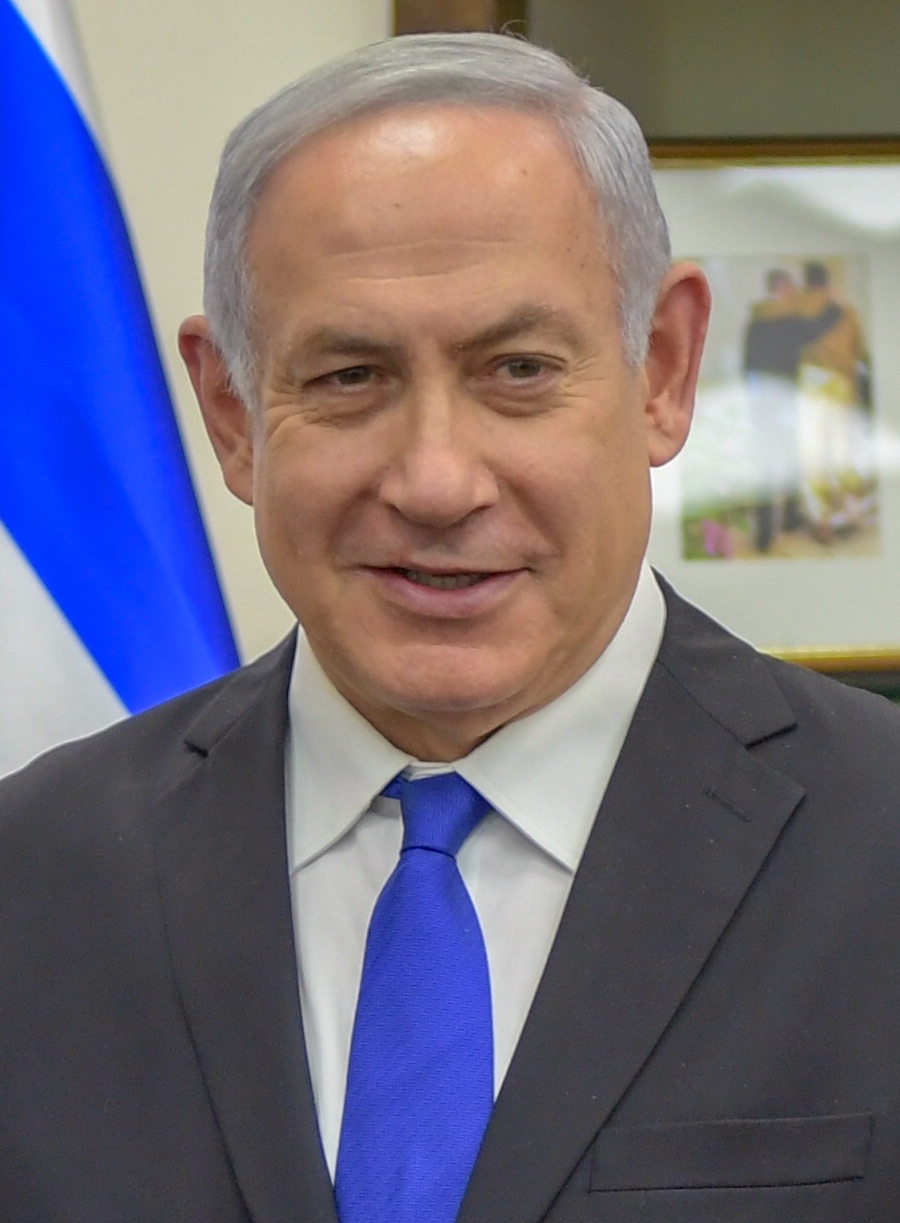

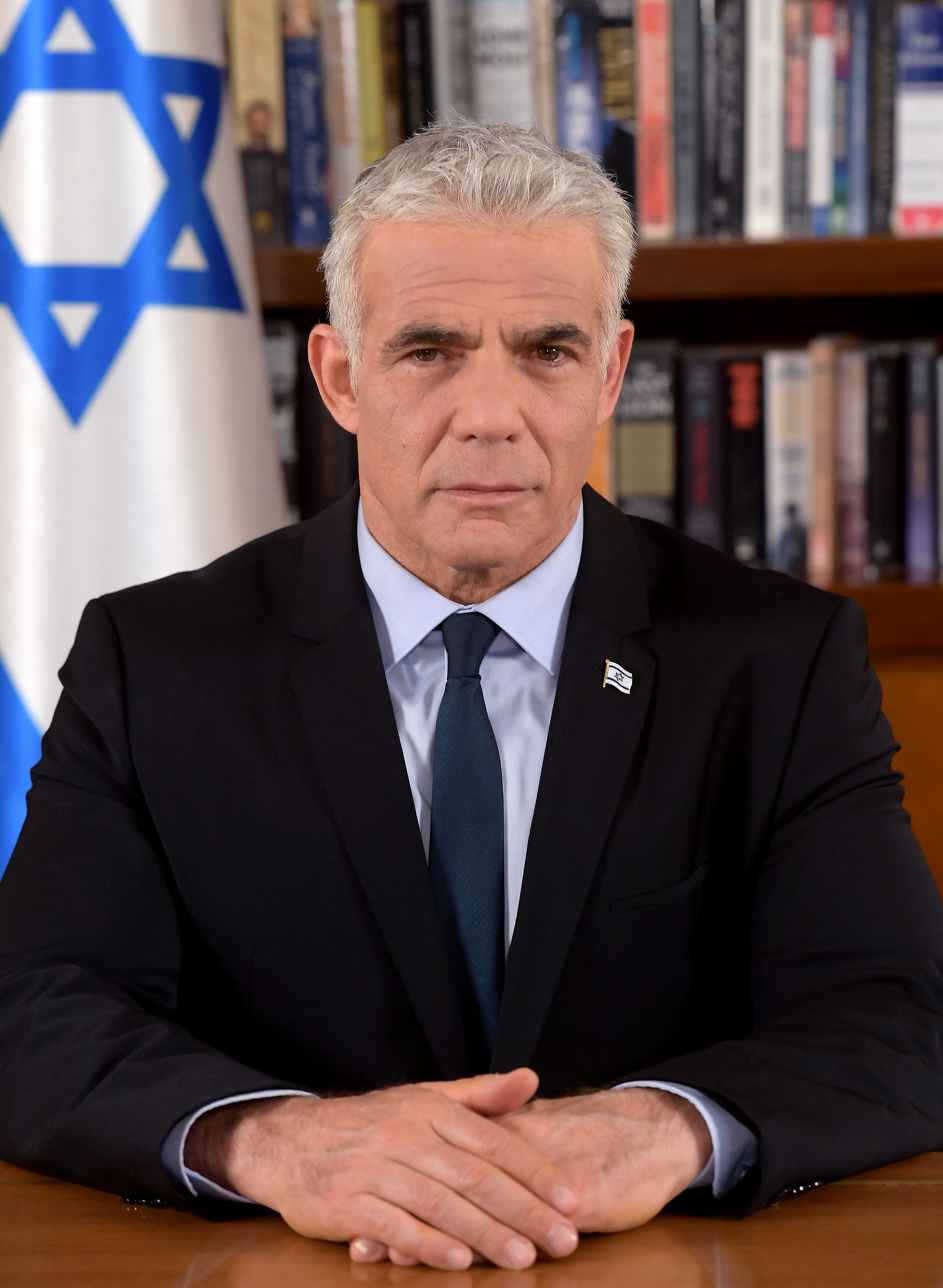

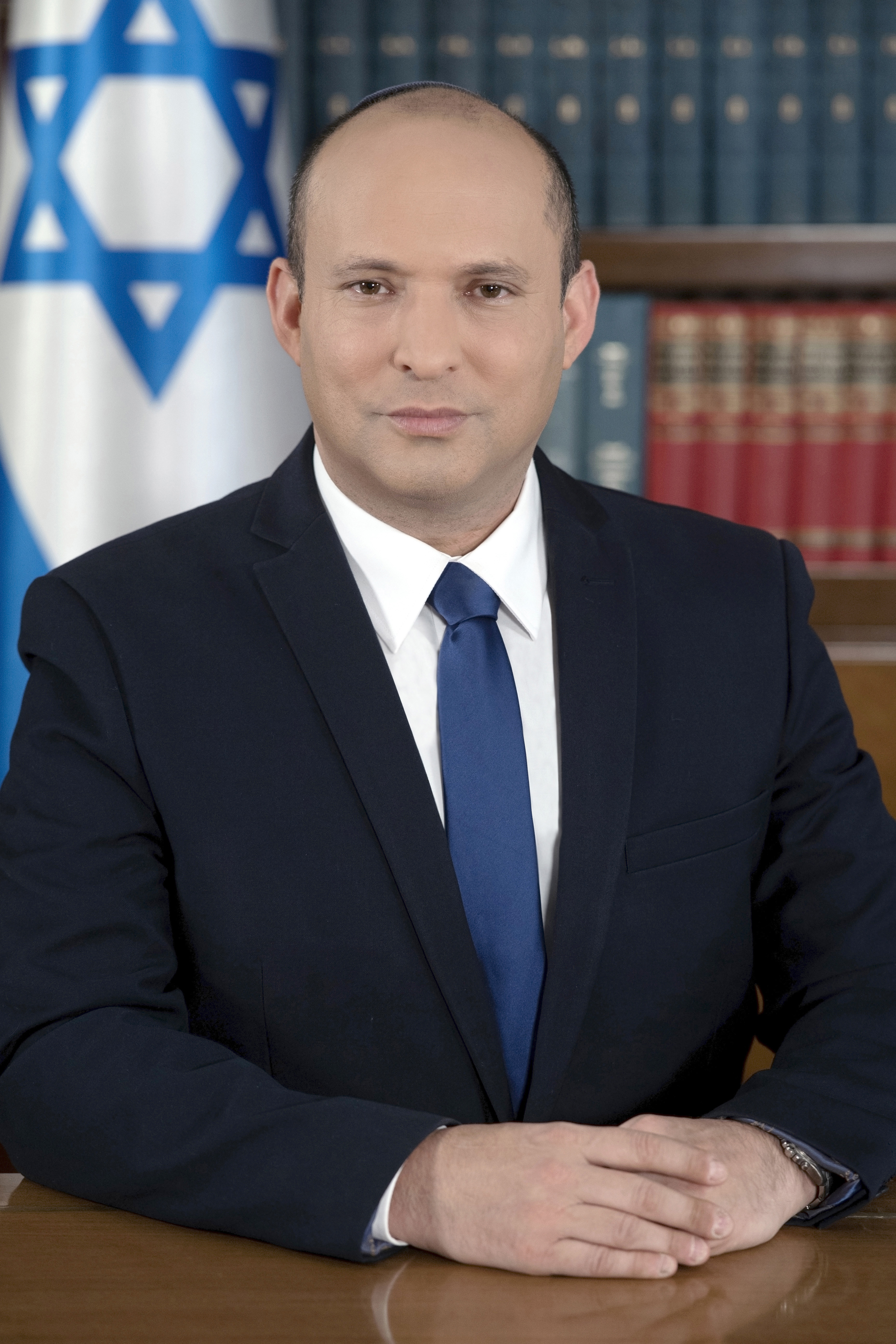
Nominee	Benjamin Netanyahu	Yair Lapid	Naftali Bennett
Party	Likud	Yesh Atid	Yamina
Electoral vote	52	45	7
Prime Minister before election
Benjamin Netanyahu
Likud
Outcome of formation
No government formed and negotiations continue.
Netanyahu remains prime minister ad interim.

Party	Party leader	Seats	Recommended	Source
Likud	Benjamin Netanyahu	30	Netanyahu	
Yesh Atid	Yair Lapid	17	Lapid	
Shas	Aryeh Deri	9	Netanyahu	
Blue and White	Benny Gantz	8	Lapid	
Yamina	Naftali Bennett	7	Bennett	
Labor	Merav Michaeli	7	Lapid	
UTJ	Moshe Gafni	7	Netanyahu	
Yisrael Beiteinu	Avigdor Lieberman	7	Lapid	
Religious Zionist	Bezalel Smotrich	6	Netanyahu	
Joint List	Ayman Odeh	6	No one	
New Hope	Gideon Sa'ar	6	No one	
Meretz	Nitzan Horowitz	6	Lapid	
Ra'am	Mansour Abbas	4	No one	

=== Netanyahu's mandate (6 April–4 May 2021) ===
On 6 April 2021, Benjamin Netanyahu was given the first mandate to establish a coalition by the president Reuven Rivlin. During his efforts to form a government, he offered both his allies and his rivals several proposals for rotation agreements, which would see the prime ministership change hands between parties mid-term. Namely, in a bid to appease Bennett and Sa'ar – either of whom was foreseen to take part in a potential rotation, he offered the post to fellow Likud member and Knesset speaker Yariv Levin. Thereafter, Netanyahu also unsuccessfully tried to include Aryeh Deri of Shas, and then the incumbent Alternate Prime Minister, Benny Gantz of Blue and White, into similar agreements. Netanyahu's mandate to form a government formally expired at midnight on 4 May 2021.

While Netanyahu held the formal mandate to lead talks on a new government, simultaneous discussions were taking place between the parties of the "change bloc". Namely, Lapid stated his willingness to enter into a rotation government with Naftali Bennett, and even offered him the opportunity to hold the post of prime minister for the first half of the Knesset term. These efforts to establish a broad anti-Netanyahu government, which would span the whole political spectrum, were challenged by questions relating to the distribution of ministerial portfolios between the three main blocs (right, centre, and left), as well as to the possibility of including a mutual veto into any coalition agreement among the parties. Another concern was that such an ideologically diverse, seven-party, coalition would still not hold an absolute parliamentary majority – thus requiring outside support to govern effectively. Parties that were mentioned as hypothetical partners in such a cooperation agreement included Ra'am. and United Torah Judaism (especially its Degel HaTorah faction).

=== May recommendations ===
Israeli government formation, May 2021
- May 2021
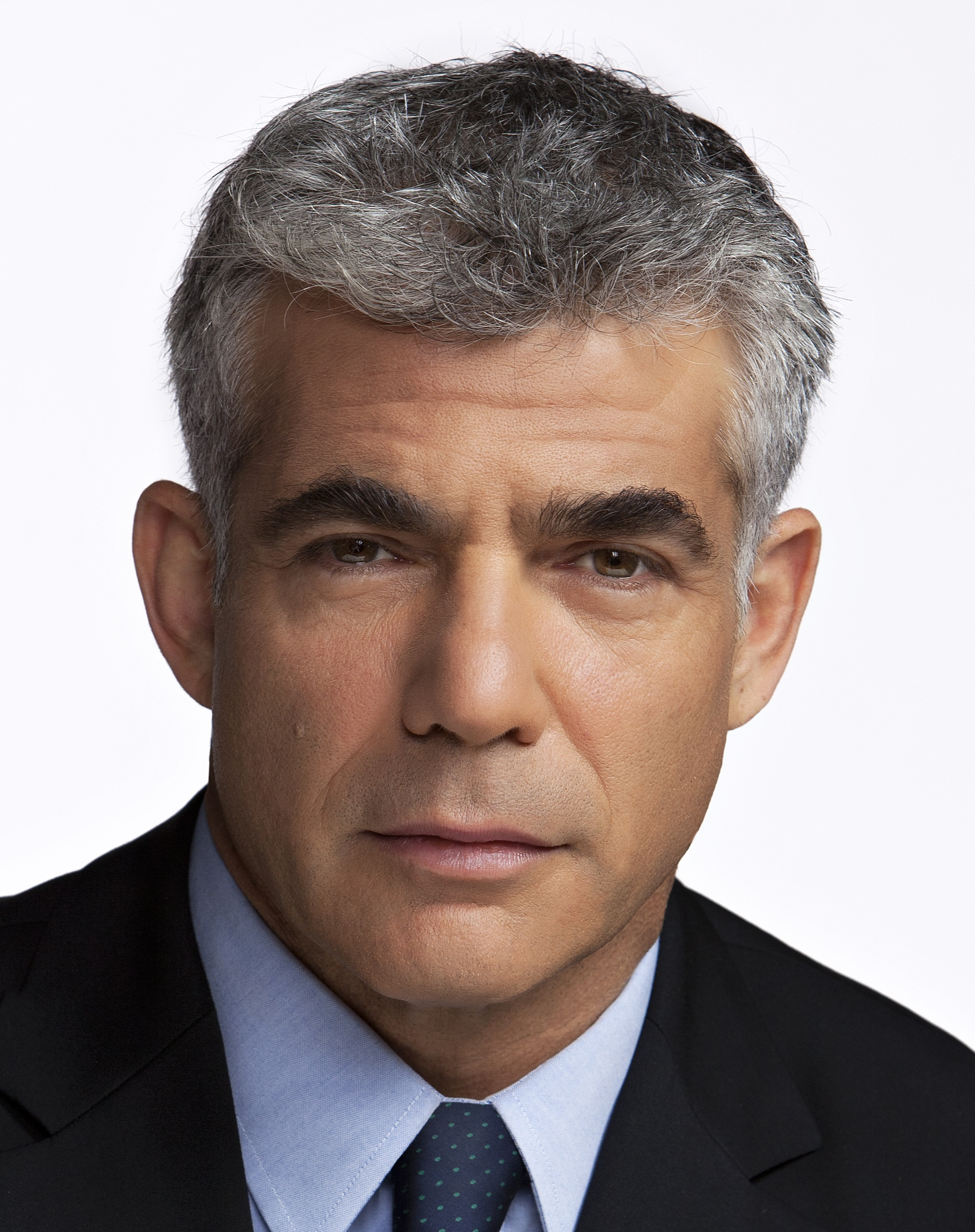

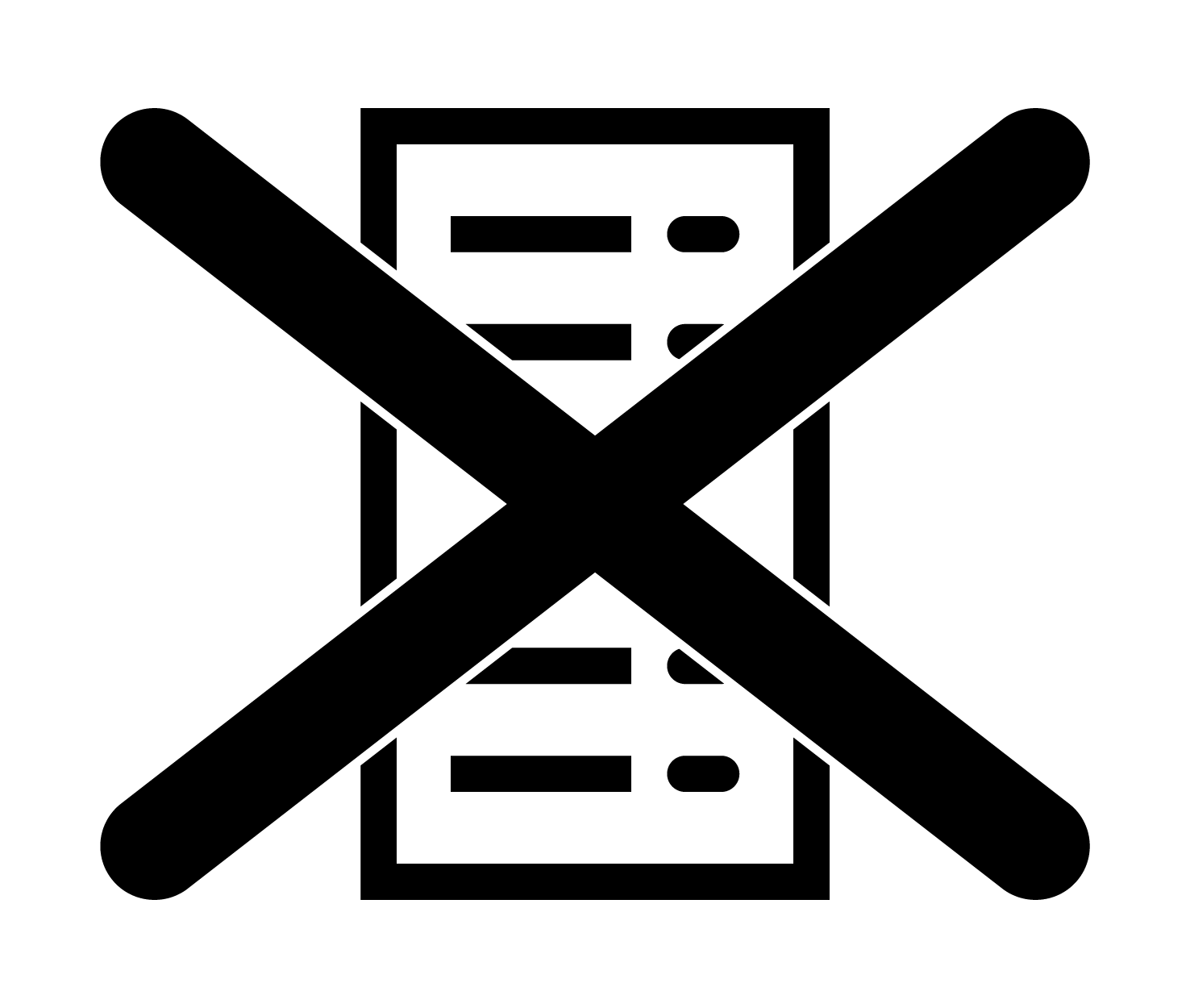

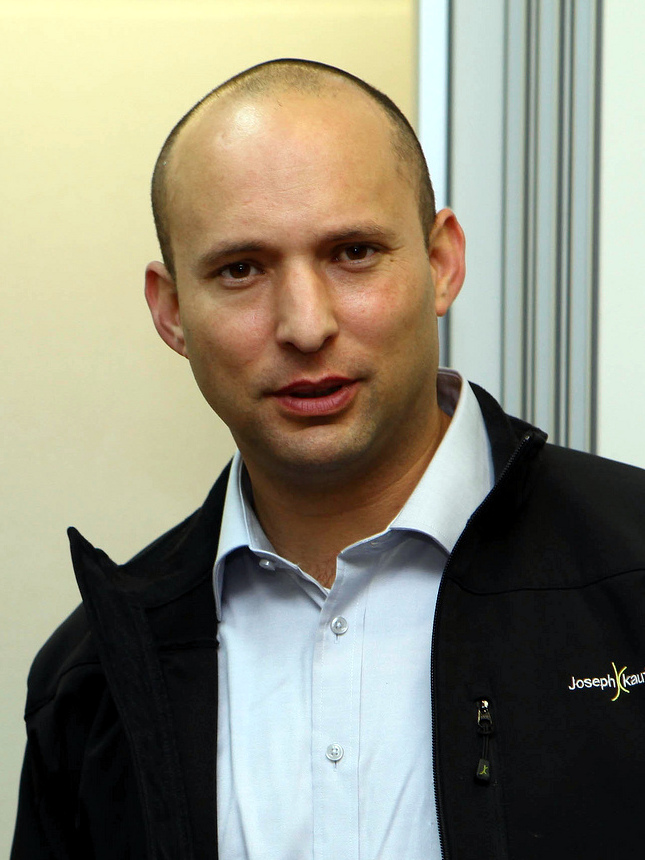
Nominee	Yair Lapid	Government formation impossible (Note: These factions argued that the President should deem the formation of a government impossible, triggering a 21-day period allowing the Knesset members to recommend a candidate by themselves, as per Basic Law: The Government, which states: article 9(a): "[...] the President may assign the task of forming a Government to another Knesset Member who has notified him that he is prepared to accept the task, or may inform the Speaker of the Knesset that he sees no possibility of forming a Government"; article 10(a): "[...] a majority of the members of the Knesset may request, in writing, that the President of the State assign the task to a particular member of the Knesset, who so agreed in writing, all within 21 days of the President's announcement")	Naftali Bennett
Party	Yesh Atid		Yamina
Electoral vote	56	52	7
Investiture vote – In favor			60
Investiture vote – Against			59
Investiture vote – Abstain			1
Prime Minister before election
Benjamin Netanyahu
Likud
Outcome of formation
Yair Lapid (Yesh Atid) was tasked with forming the government.
The Prime Minister appointed was Naftali Bennett (Yamina).

Party	Party leader	Seats	Recommended	Source
Likud	Benjamin Netanyahu	30	Knesset	
Yesh Atid	Yair Lapid	17	Lapid	
Shas	Aryeh Deri	9	Knesset	
Blue and White	Benny Gantz	8	Lapid	
Yamina	Naftali Bennett	7	Bennett	
Labor	Merav Michaeli	7	Lapid	
UTJ	Moshe Gafni	7	Knesset	
Yisrael Beiteinu	Avigdor Lieberman	7	Lapid	
Religious Zionist	Bezalel Smotrich	6	Knesset	
Joint List	Ayman Odeh	6	divided	
Hadash	Ayman Odeh	3	Lapid	
Ta'al	Ahmad Tibi	2	Lapid	
Balad	Sami Abu Shehadeh	1	No one	
New Hope	Gideon Sa'ar	6	Lapid	
Meretz	Nitzan Horowitz	6	Lapid	
Ra'am	Mansour Abbas	4	No one	

=== Lapid's mandate (5 May–2 June 2021) ===
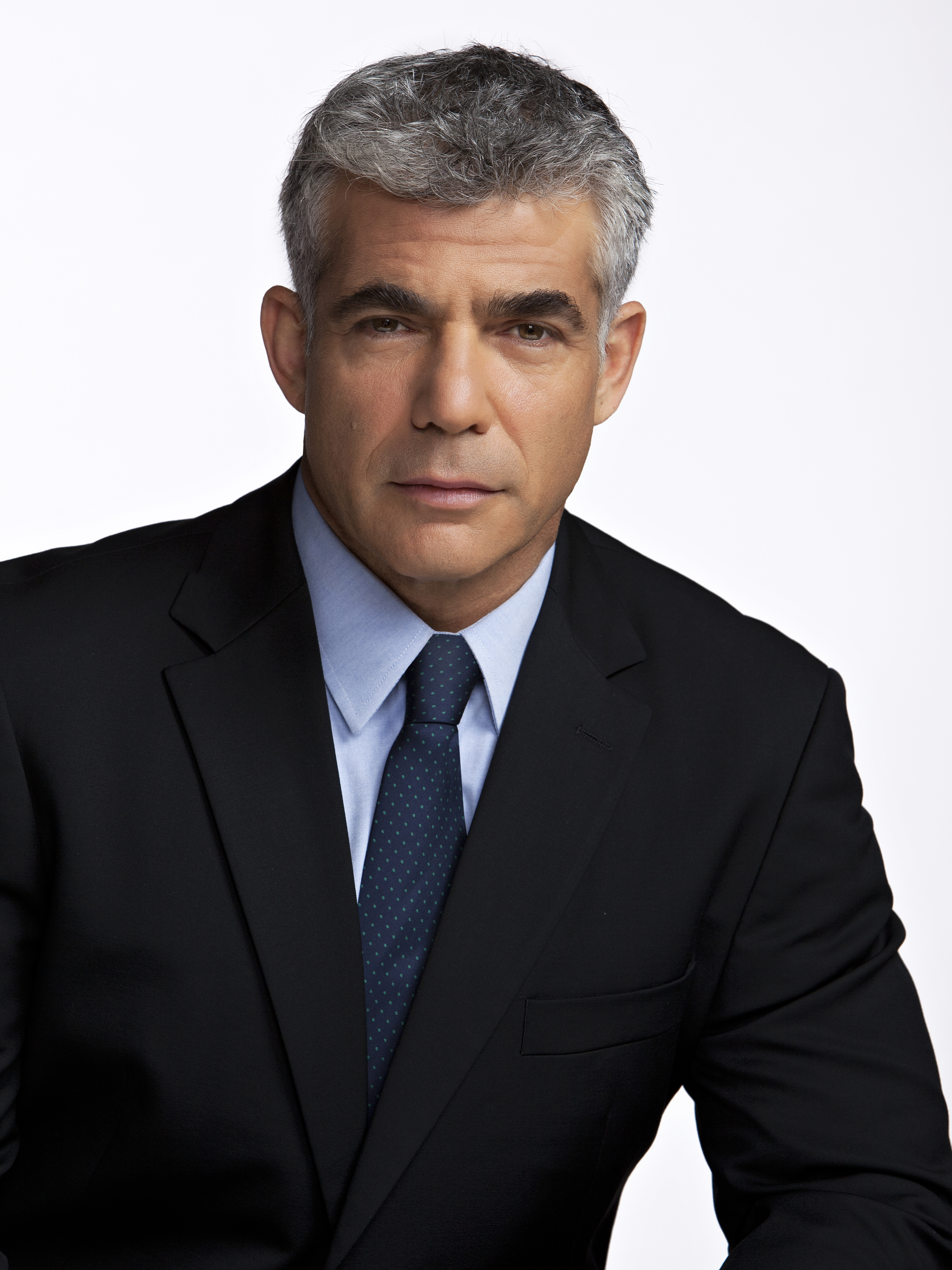
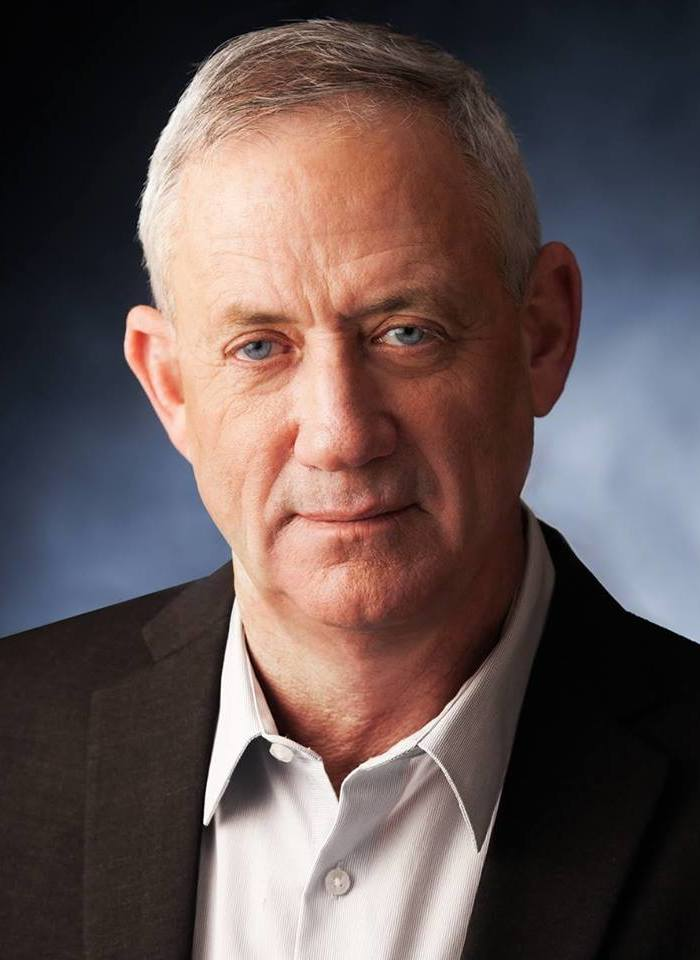
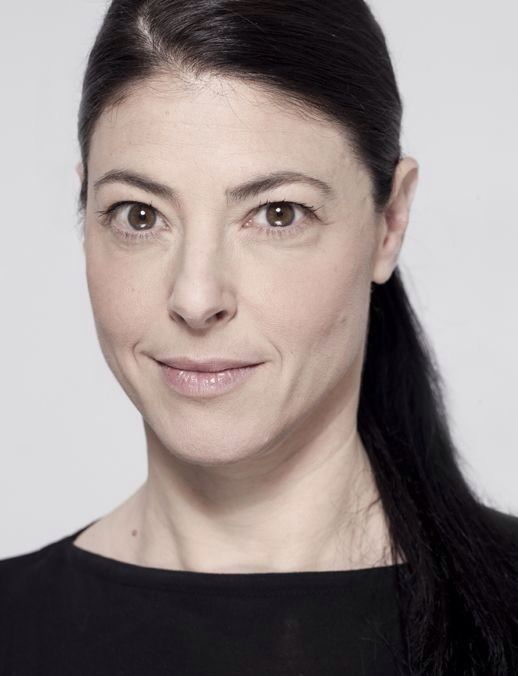
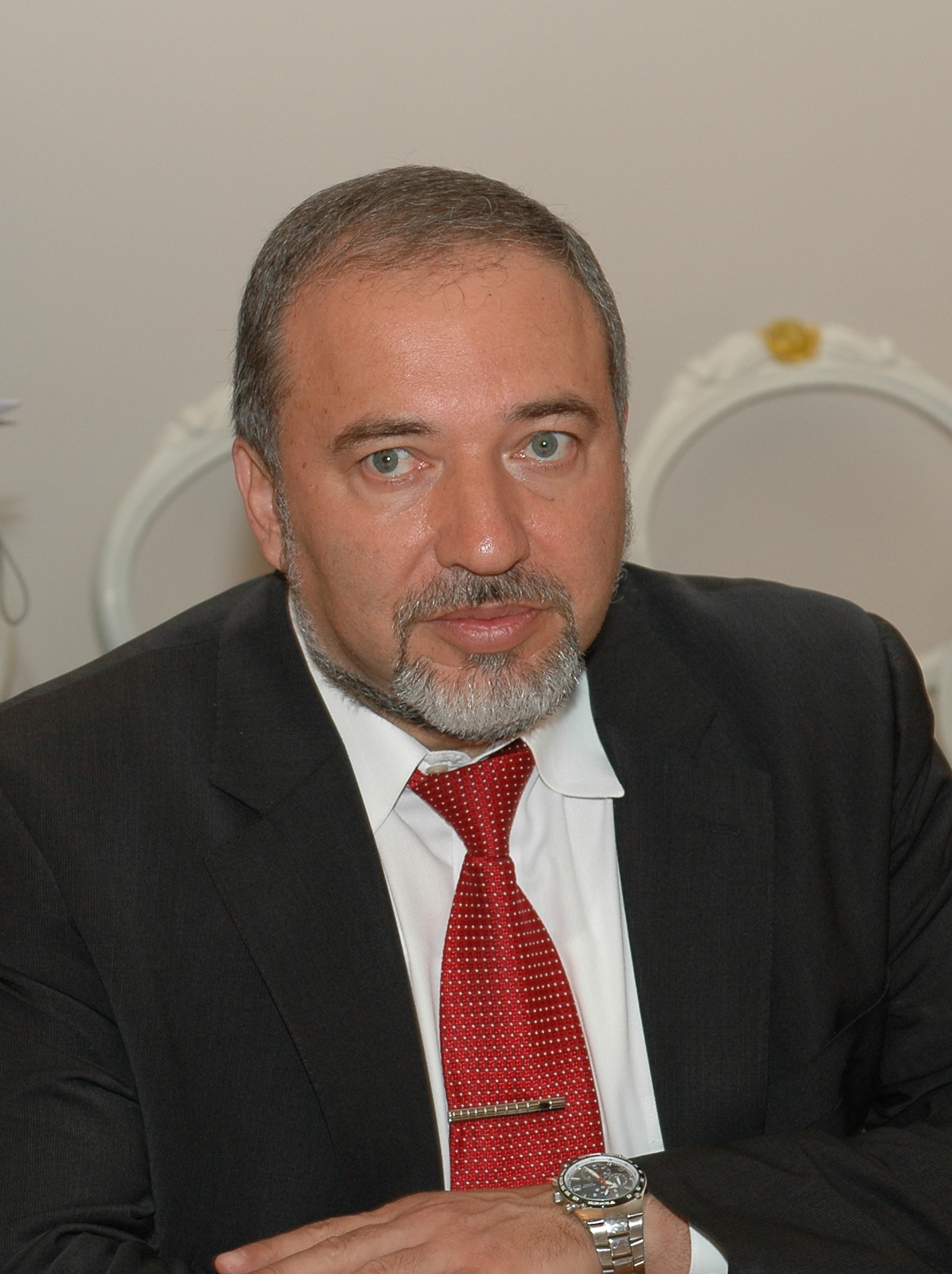
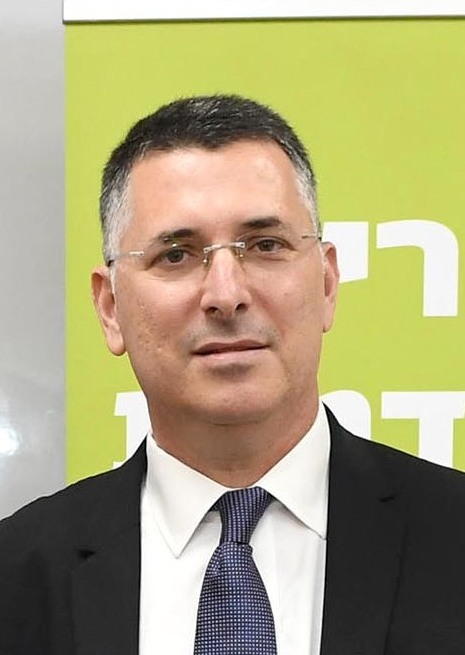
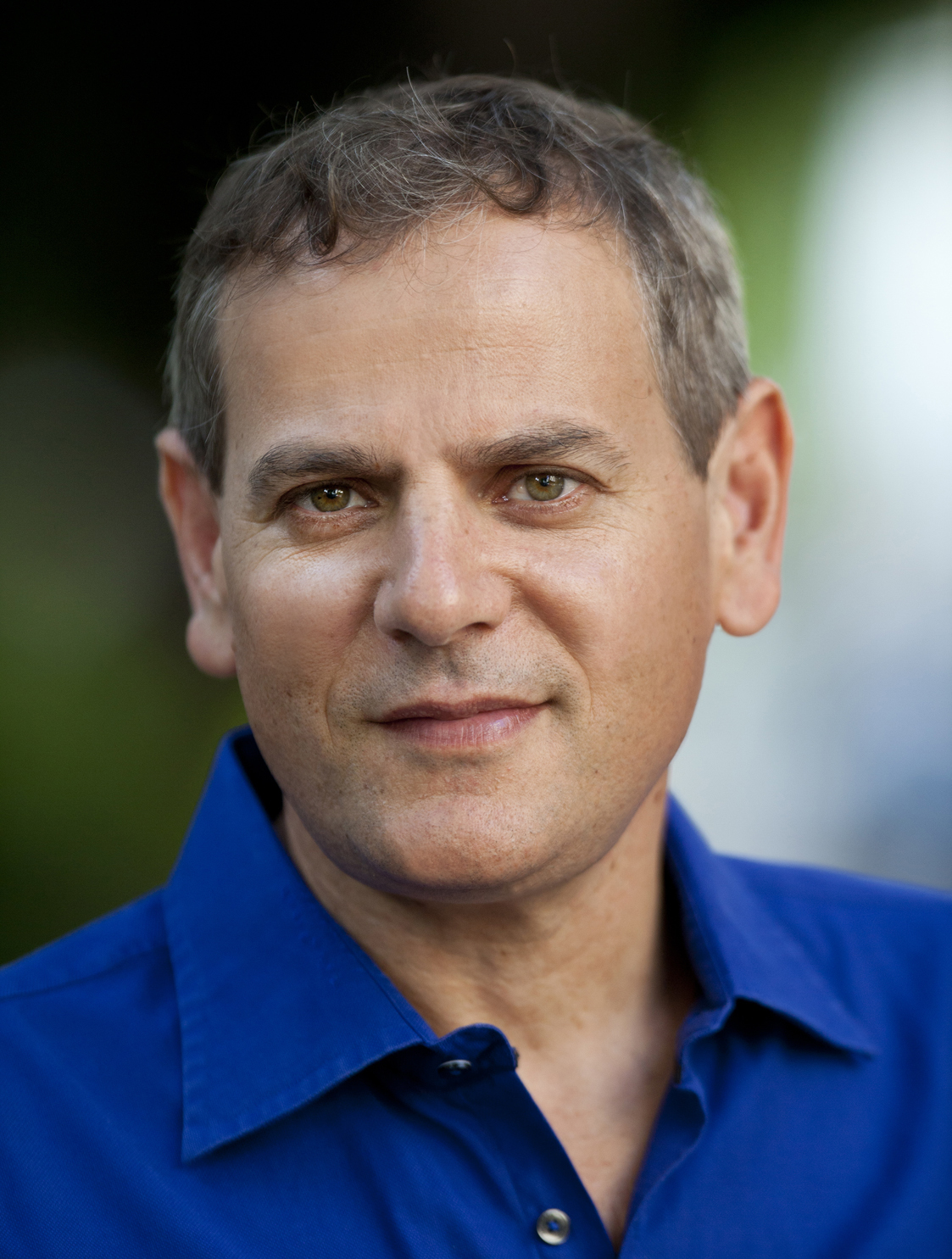
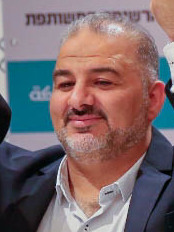
Leaders of the anti-Netanyahu "change bloc".
Top row: Lapid (Yesh Atid), Gantz (Blue and White), Michaeli (Labor)
Bottom row: Lieberman (Yisrael Beiteinu), Sa'ar (New Hope), Horowitz (Meretz) and Mansour Abbas (Ra'am)

On 5 May 2021, Yesh Atid leader Yair Lapid was officially tasked with the formation of a government by president Rivlin. He had been recommended for the prime ministership by 56 Knesset members from seven factions – including New Hope and almost all of the Joint List. On the same day, Knesset member Amichai Chikli of Yamina publicly opposed any coalition that would include Meretz or Joint List, which lowered the bloc's plurality from 58 to 57 seats.

On 7 May 2021, parties in the change bloc held negotiations for coalition. Yisrael Beiteinu issued several conditions for entering coalition, including a two-term limit for the prime minister, compulsory voting in elections, Haredi conscription, increasing secular studies in the Haredi community, life imprisonment for the rape of a minor, allowing local authorities to decide on the closure of businesses on Saturdays, the introduction of civil law marriage, as well as a new, two-year state budget. Additionally, party leader Avigdor Lieberman promised to set up two state commissions of inquiry, one to investigate the previous government's role in the 2021 Meron stampede in April, and the other over the government's management of the COVID-19 pandemic in Israel. The proposal to allow civil marriages drew strong opposition from Ra'am, which views it as a "violation of family values". Ra'am also laid out its own coalition conditions, namely a five-year economic plan for the Arab community, a plan on tackling violent crime, annulment of a 2019 law banning illegal construction, and solutions to problems facing the Negev Bedouins.

The parties considered introducing legislation for a two-term limit for prime minister, which would have prevented Netanyahu from returning without a grandfather clause. The proposal also banned anyone indicted from receiving a mandate for government formation, serve as prime minister or as opposition leader. Naftali Bennett proposed direct election of prime minister, which Likud also supported, and Ra'am also supported under some conditions for improving livelihoods in the Arab community.

Local sources thus reported that Lapid had intended to inform president Rivlin of his success in building a government by the end of the second week of May, with the swearing-in of Naftali Bennett as Israel's 13th prime minister then due to take place some time after the Shavuot festival (which fell between 16 and 18 May 2021).

==== Minister positions ====
On 8 May, media sources reported that change bloc parties had agreed on several mechanisms principles as a basis for cooperation, including a rotation for prime minister between Bennett and Lapid for two years each. They also agreed on Avigdor Lieberman as finance minister and Lapid as foreign minister during Bennett's premiership. A rotation discussion was held for the Knesset speaker between Meir Cohen of Yesh Atid and Ze'ev Elkin of New Hope. New Hope also wanted to divide the post of Attorney General and create the position of a general prosecutor, while Ayelet Shaked of Yamina was given the choice of either interior, public security, education or transportation minister. As negotiations continued, some disagreements remained over specific minister positions, most notably for justice, education and defense which had multiple contenders between the bloc parties. In addition, Yamina requested the positions for public security and religious affairs for being "ideological" in nature, while Ra'am asked for a major Knesset committee. (Note: The contenders were as follows, with the eventual minister bolded: Justice: Ayelet Shaked (Yamina) and Gideon Sa'ar (New Hope); Education: Yamina, Yifat Shasha-Biton (New Hope), and Nitzan Horowitz (Meretz); Defense: Benny Gantz (Blue and White) and Gideon Sa'ar (New Hope))

On 2 June, Lapid, Bennett, and Abbas held a private meeting to reach a last-minute agreement on portfolios during Lapid's term as prime minister. They agreed that Bennett would serve as interior minister (in addition to being Alternate Prime Minister), Shaked would become justice minister, and Sa'ar would take over as foreign minister.

==== Negotiations with Ra'am ====
By 10 May, media sources reported that Ra'am was negotiating coalition talks with the six-party change bloc, with the bloc agreeing to coalition demands from Ra'am including the legal village recognition for 3 Bedouin communities and a budget with funding for tackling violent crime in the Arab community. However, the 2021 Israel–Palestine crisis deteriorated significantly that day with an exchange of rocket fire between Israel and Hamas leading to hundreds of injuries. As a result of these incidents, coalition talks were frozen indefinitely, although Ra'am leader Mansour Abbas reiterated his commitment for returning to coalition talks once the crisis is brought under control.

On 1 June as negotiations concluded, Mansour Abbas announced that Ra'am intends to be a full coalition member in the new government and requested the post of deputy interior minister, who would most likely serve under Ayelet Shaked of Yamina. Meanwhile, Ta'al members were considering supporting the government, while the Hadash and Balad factions of the Joint List remained opposed to the coalition and would vote against it in a confidence vote.

However, the negotiations were challenged when prime minister Netanyahu agreed to repeal the Kaminitz Law regulating housing construction, which was a major demand from Ra'am. This led Ra'am to heighten its demand to the prospective coalition which increased tensions within the coalition as right-wing partners opposed repealing the legislation.

Ultimately on 2 June, the Southern Islamic Movement's shura council gave support for Ra'am to join the coalition government three hours before the deadline, conditioned on continued negotiations over the so-called "Kaminitz law" and the legalization of Bedouin villages in the Negev, and Ra'am joined the coalition soon afterwards.

==== Negotiations with Yamina ====
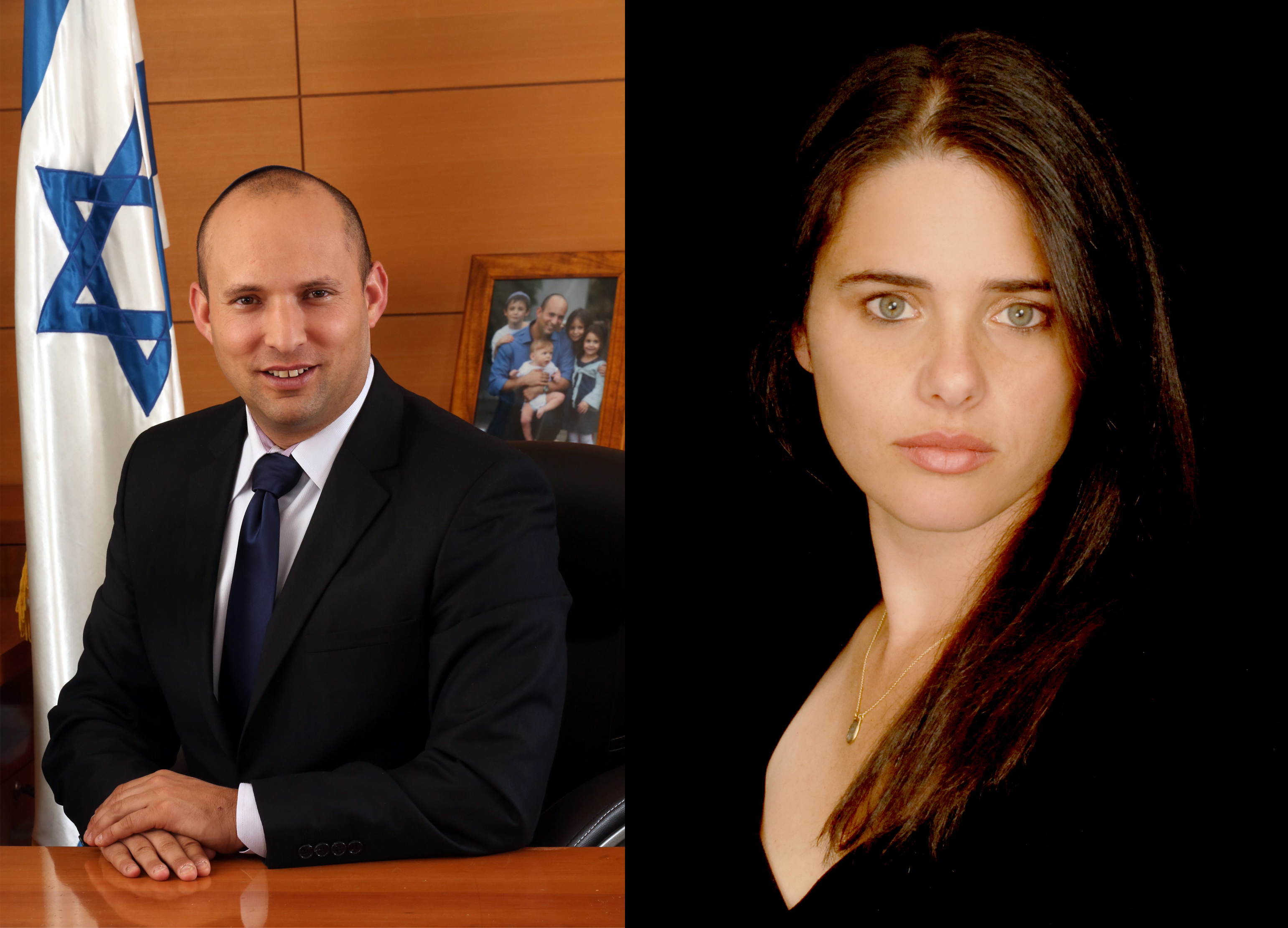
Yamina leader Naftali Bennett (left) and influential party MK Ayelet Shaked (right)

on 10 May, the change bloc negotiated with Yamina over a coalition agreement, which involved topics of religion and West Bank settlements. They agreed to support religious matters based on broad consensus, to maintain existing Israeli settlements there and allow further construction within them, but will not allow any new settlements or annexation, and also to establish a state commission of inquiry into the 2021 Meron crowd crush.

In the evening of 13 May, Yamina formally abandoned coalition talks citing the ongoing 2021 Israel–Palestine crisis with skepticism that a government reliant on Ra'am could effectively respond to security challenges, including placing legal consequences for perpetrators. Bennett then restarted talks with Likud for a unity government open to Yesh Atid, Blue and White and New Hope. However, neither Blue and White or New Hope were willing to sit in coalition with Netanyahu. The next day, Likud and Yamina reached an agreement for a new government, with Yamina receiving 8 of top 40 candidates on party list, and where Bennett and Shaked would serve as defense and foreign ministers respectively. Still, Lapid maintained a desire to continue negotiations for a change government and intended on keeping the mandate until expiration, while remaining open to new elections if the deadlock remained.

On 23 May, Bennett reversed his position and announced that he was again open to serving with Lapid. Four days later, Lapid and Bennett met privately to discuss coalition agreements without knowledge from other Yamina members. Then on 30 May, Bennett re-affirmed support for a rotational prime minister between himself and Lapid, where he would serve as prime minister until September 2023 and Lapid would take over afterwards until the end of term.

On 1 June, negotiations again stalled with a disagreement over membership in the Judicial Selection Committee. Ayelet Shaked of Yamina wanted a position for herself even though it was already promised to Merav Michaeli of Labor. Both sides then negotiated over potential rotation arrangements the next day. Shaked proposed ideological alignment with the prime ministership, where Yamina would control the committee during Bennett's tenure as prime minister, while Michaeli wanted ideological balance where the prime minister and committee member would be from different parties. The two parties eventually agreed on the first arrangement of ideological alignment.

Later that day, Nir Orbach of Yamina announced that he was considering voting against the government in the Knesset, which would deprive the coalition of parliamentary majority with only 60 seats. During the negotiations at the Kfar Maccabiah Hotel, rival protests were held between supporters and opponents of the negotiations, with some right-wing activists threatening to burn down Orbach's house in Petah Tikva were he to vote in favor of the new coalition. The crisis was ultimately averted when Orbach voted in favor of the new government in the Knesset.

==== Other parties ====
On 25 May, Meretz agreed to a coalition government and Lapid handed them the ministries of health, environment, and regional cooperation if the coalition government gets formed, while Yisrael Beiteinu will receive the ministry of treasury. Then on 28 May, Lapid also secured an agreement with Labor.

==== Presidential election ====
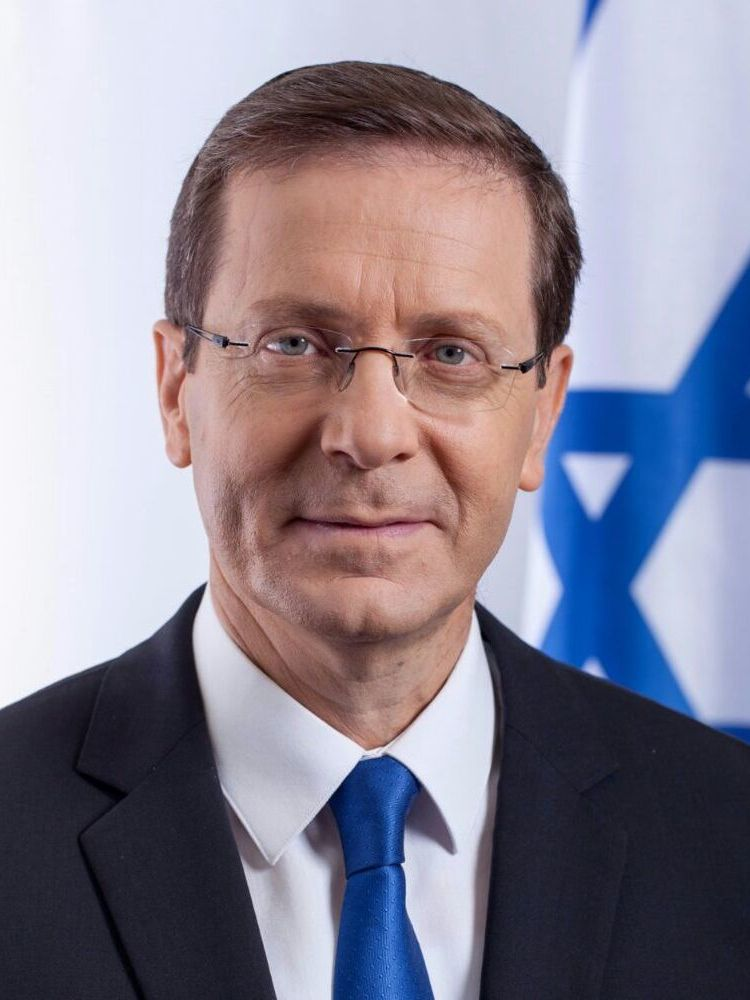
Isaac Herzog was easily elected as the 11th President of Israel during the government formation.

Negotiations on the possible "change government" also took place on the sidelines of a Knesset session called to elect the new president of Israel. Isaac Herzog was easily elected as the 11th president of the country, and achieved the support of a broad range of parties. He received 87 votes, to just 26 for his only rival, Miriam Peretz.

==== Coalition government ====
On the night of 2 June 2021, and less than an hour before his mandate was due to expire, Lapid informed outgoing president Reuven Rivlin that he can form a new government. Had Lapid not succeeded in assembling a coalition by then, he could have been given a one-week extension as long as he claimed to have a government ready to be voted on. Otherwise, the mandate would return to the president and given to anyone nominated by the Knesset. Unless efforts for a majority coalition was successful, the Knesset would then dissolve itself and call new elections.

On 11 June 2021, the last coalition agreement was signed between Yamina and Yesh Atid, with the new government sworn in on 13 June. On 12 June 2021, media sources released the content of the final coalition agreements signed between the "change bloc" parties in the preceding days.

== Policy priorities ==
The basic guidelines of the new government's policy would be the following: a bill to set term limits for the prime minister and allow only one re-election (though the details of the bill are not yet laid out), the setting up of a commission of inquiry to investigate the April 2021 Mount Meron disaster, the abolition of four existing government ministries – Cyber and National Digital Matters, National Infrastructures, Energy and Water Resources, Community Empowerment and Advancement, and Strategic Affairs; the increasing of the old-age income supplement to 70% of the minimum wage, the adoption of a reform package to benefit disabled war veterans, the creation of more competition among the providers of kashrut services and the introduction of consistent standards in that area, as well as the changing of the body which selects the chief rabbi (so as to allow for the election of a Zionist to the position), and the opening up of the possibility for gentiles to convert to Judaism by applying with municipal rabbinical authorities. The agreement includes creating binding regulations for reduce GHG emissions.

== Members of government ==
=== Ministers ===
The following are the ministers of the 36th Israeli government.

Portfolio	Minister	Party
Prime Minister	Naftali Bennett (Jun. 2021 - Jun. 2022)	Yamina
Prime Minister	Yair Lapid (Jul. - Dec. 2022)	Yesh Atid
Alternate Prime Minister	Yair Lapid (Jun. 2021 - Jun. 2022)	Yesh Atid
Alternate Prime Minister	Naftali Bennett (Jul. - Dec. 2022)	Yamina
Deputy Prime Minister; Minister of Defense	Benny Gantz	Blue and White
Deputy Prime Minister; Minister of Justice	Gideon Sa'ar	New Hope
Minister of Agriculture and Rural Development; Minister for the Development of the Periphery, the Negev, and the Galilee	Oded Forer	Yisrael Beiteinu
Minister of Aliyah and Integration	Pnina Tamano-Shata	Blue and White
Minister of Communications	Yoaz Hendel	New Hope
Minister of Community Affairs	Naftali Bennett	Yamina
Minister of Housing and Construction; Minister of Jerusalem Affairs and Heritage	Ze'ev Elkin (Note: Also serves as the liaison minister between the government and the Knesset.)	New Hope
Minister of Culture and Sport	Hili Tropper	Blue and White
Minister of Diaspora Affairs	Nachman Shai	Labor Party
Minister of the Economy	Orna Barbivai	Yesh Atid
Minister of Education	Yifat Shasha-Biton	New Hope
Minister of Environmental Protection	Tamar Zandberg	Meretz
Minister of Finance	Avigdor Lieberman	Yisrael Beiteinu
Minister in the Finance Ministry	Hamad Amar	Yisrael Beiteinu
Minister of Foreign Affairs; Minister of Strategic Affairs	Yair Lapid	Yesh Atid
Minister of Health	Nitzan Horowitz	Meretz
Minister of Intelligence	Elazar Stern	Yesh Atid
Minister of the Interior	Ayelet Shaked	Yamina
Minister of Labor, Social Affairs, and Social Services	Meir Cohen	Yesh Atid
Minister of National Infrastructure, Energy, and Water	Karine Elharrar	Yesh Atid
Minister of Public Security; Minister for Community Empowerment and Advancement	Omer Bar-Lev	Labor Party
Minister of Regional Cooperation	Issawi Frej	Meretz
Minister of Religious Affairs	Matan Kahana	Yamina
Minister of Science and Technology	Orit Farkash-Hacohen	Blue and White
Minister for Social Equality	Meirav Cohen	Yesh Atid
Minister of Tourism	Yoel Razvozov	Yesh Atid
Minister of Transportation	Merav Michaeli	Labor Party
Minister without portfolio	Mansour Abbas	Ra'am

=== Deputy ministers ===
Portfolio	Minister	Party
Deputy Minister of Economic Reforms in the Prime Minister's office	Abir Kara	Yamina
Deputy Minister of Defense	Alon Schuster	Blue and White
Deputy Minister of Foreign Affairs	Idan Roll	Yesh Atid
Deputy Minister of Education	Meir Yitzhak Halevi	New Hope
Deputy Minister of Internal Security	Yoav Segalovitz	Yesh Atid
Deputy Minister of the Economy	Yair Golan	Meretz

== Investiture vote ==
The outgoing speaker of the Knesset, Yariv Levin, a member of prime minister Netanyahu's Likud party, had indicated that he would attempt to delay the holding of an investiture vote for the proposed Bennett-Lapid government for as long as legally possible. Thus, on 3 June 2021, some of the parties of the "change bloc" initiated a motion of no-confidence in Levin, with the aim of replacing him with Mickey Levy of Yesh Atid and bringing the investiture vote forward. Immediately thereafter, Yamina MK Nir Orbach indicated that he would oppose the move, and it was then instead unilaterally endorsed by all six MKs from the Joint List. Yesh Atid and Yamina rejected the Joint List's offer of support, and Yamina even indicated that it would only support the election of a new speaker when the new government itself had already been sworn in. On 13 June 2021, the incoming government nominated Levy for the post of speaker, while Shas in turn nominated its MK Yaakov Margi. Levy defeated Margi by a margin of 67–52 and immediately took over the presiding of the Knesset session from Levin.

The investiture vote for the government was also held on 13 June 2021. While the eight parties of the so-called "change bloc" coalition formally had an absolute majority consisting of 62 Knesset members, one Yamina MK, Amichai Chikli, had already ruled out supporting the incoming government. As of the proposed government's announcement on 2 June 2021, the only opposition MKs who had not yet declared how they would vote were the two members of the Arab Israeli Ta'al faction within the Joint List. On 13 June 2021, Ta'al's MKs indicated that they would be ready to abstain during the investiture vote if the proposed government lost its own majority through defections. This would likely have allowed the Bennett-Lapid government to be confirmed to office by a plurality of MKs. Ultimately, the new government was successfully voted in by a margin of 60 to 59, with the only abstention being that of Ra'am MK Said al-Harumi.

Vote on the confirmation of the 36th Government of the State of Israel
Ballot	13 June 2021	
Required majority	Plurality of all MKs	
Yes	60 / 120	check
No	59 / 120	
Abstentions	1 / 120	

== Policies ==
=== Economy ===
In September 2021, the government introduced open-banking reforms that would allow for non-banks to provide services in an effort to improve economic competition in the banking sector.

In February 2022, finance minister Avigdor Lieberman introduced a $1.3 billion plan aimed at reducing the cost of living. The plan includes child tax credits and child care subsidies for working parents, reduction of tariffs, lower excise taxes on energy, and increased work grants for low-income workers.

=== National defense ===
On 23 November 2021, the government decided to raise salaries for conscript soldiers by 50% following public backlash over salary stagnation.

On 19 June 2022, an aid reforms package for disabled veterans was passed to allow for additional funding towards specialized housing and rent while also giving them options for alternative transportation.

=== Disaster response ===
In August 2021, the government approved rehabilitation measures in response to the 2021 Israel wildfires, including assistance to local authorities and ecological restoration.

=== Education ===
In August 2022, the government reached a deal with the teachers' union in Israel for increased salaries just a day before the school year was scheduled to begin.

=== Environmental protection ===
In July 2021, the government announced plans for Israel to commit to cutting carbon emissions by 85% before 2050 to combat climate change.

In October 2021, Israel joined an American-European initiative aimed at reducing Methane emissions by 30% before 2030.

In December 2021, energy minister Karine Elharrar announced that Israel will pause natural gas exploration for at least a year in an effort to increase production of renewable energy. However, this did not last as a global energy crisis compelled the government to reverse course and launch an exploration for natural gas in May 2022.

=== Corruption investigation ===
On 23 January 2022, the cabinet approved a state commission of inquiry into the Submarine affair with allegations of corruption.

=== Foreign policy ===
In July 2021, Israel and South Korea agreed to a Coronavirus vaccine exchange agreement, where Israel will send 700,000 doses of vaccines to South Korea in exchange for future vaccine shipments.

On 17 August 2022, the office of Israeli Prime Minister Yair Lapid announced that Israel and Turkey had decided to restore full diplomatic ties and will return ambassadors to each other's country. In September 2022, Lapid and Turkish President Erdoğan met in the United Nations General Assembly in New York, the first between the Israeli and Turkish heads of government in 14 years.

== Dissolution ==
On 13 June 2022, Nir Orbach of Yamina withdrew his support for the government because the coalition was unable to agree over renewing legal protections to West Bank settlers. This caused the coalition to lose parliamentary majority and a potential for collapse.

Then a week later on 20 June, Bennett and Lapid jointly announced the introduction of a bill to dissolve the Knesset, stating that Lapid would become the interim prime minister following the dissolution.

The bill to dissolve the Knesset passed its first reading on 28 June. It then passed its third reading on 29 June, and the date for elections was set for 1 November 2022. Bennett opted to retire from politics and not seek re-election; he resigned as the leader of Yamina on 29 June, and was succeeded by Ayelet Shaked.

On 30 June, in accordance with the coalition agreement, Lapid succeeded Bennett as the caretaker Prime Minister until a new government is formed. Bennett turned down the position of acting Foreign Minister, although he formally remained alternate Prime Minister. Lapid thus continued to hold the position of Foreign Minister.

== See also ==
- 2018–2022 Israeli political crisis
- List of members of the twenty-fourth Knesset
