= Michel Buskila =

Israeli politician

- מישל בוסקילה
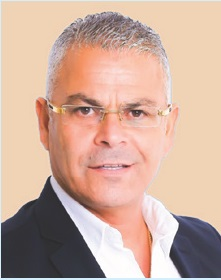

Faction represented in the Knesset
- 2022: New Hope
- 2024–2026: New Hope

Personal details
- Born: 20 April 1966 (age 60) Ashkelon, Israel

Michel Buskila (Hebrew: מישל בוסקילה; born 20 April 1966) is an Israeli politician who served as a member of the Knesset for the New Hope party in 2022 and again in from 2024 until 2026. He also served as a deputy mayor of Ashkelon.

== Biography ==
Buskila was born in Ashkelon to David and Miriam. He worked as a barber, and established several companies responsible for the management of properties, hotels, and commercial activities.

Buskila, the former leader of the Likud in Ashkelon, served as a member of its city council from May 2009, when he replaced resigning member Haim Cohen, and 2022. Buskila also served as a deputy Mayor, and briefly ran for Mayor of Ashkelon in 2018, but withdrew from the race and endorsed incumbent Itamar Shimoni. In 2014, Buskila was elected to the Likud's secretariat.

Ahead of the 2015 legislative election, Buskila ran in Likud primaries for the 22nd spot, reserved for residents of the Negev region, but was defeated by Miki Zohar. Ahead of the 2020 election, Buskila supported Gideon Saar's run for the leadership of the Likud. Sa'ar was defeated by Netanyahu.

In 2021, Buskila joined the newly-formed New Hope party led by Sa'ar, and was placed on the twelfth spot on its list ahead of the 2021 Israeli legislative election. The party won six seats. following the resignation of three of the party's legislators as part of the Norwegian Law, Michal Shir's resignation from the Knesset to join Yesh Atid, and the retirement of two other members of the New Hope list, Buskila became a Member of the Knesset in August 2022. Ahead of the 2022 election, Buskila was placed on the thirteenth spot on National Unity's list. He was not elected as the party won just twelve seats. Buskila re-entered the Knesset on 5 July 2024 following the resignation of Yifat Shasha-Biton.

In February 2025, he introduced a bill, passed by the Knesset, that denies entry to non-Israeli citizens who deny the Israeli narrative on the events of the 7 October 2023, the Holocaust, or support the prosecution of Israeli security personnel by international courts.

Buskila was appointed deputy foreign minister, following Sharren Haskel's resignation in July 2026; the appointment came in to effect on 16 July.

== Personal life ==
Buskila is married to Tal and has a daughter called Liam.
