= Israel First (political party) =

Israeli political party

Israel First ישראל תחילה
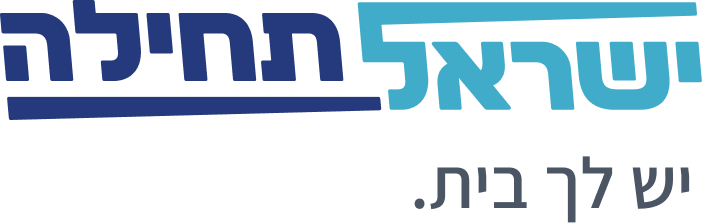
- Leader: Sharren Haskel
- Founder: Sharren Haskel
- Founded: 15 July 2026; 4 months ago
- Split from: New Hope
- Ideology: Zionism; Economic liberalism
- Political position: Right-wing
- Colours: Blue; Azure; Yellow
- Knesset: 0 / 120

Election symbol
- י

Website
- israelfirst.co.il

Israel First (Hebrew: ישראל תחילה) is an Israeli right-wing political party founded in July 2026 by Sharren Haskel, a member of the Knesset and former deputy foreign minister. Haskel formed the party after announcing her pending departure from New Hope and resigning from the government over legislation that froze the arrest and prosecution of Haredi men who had failed to comply with military draft orders. The party did not pass the electoral threshold, winning 955 votes.

The party describes itself as representing a security-oriented, national and liberal right and has advocated the formation of a broad Zionist unity government. Haskel has said that she intends the party to serve as a bridge between parties supporting Prime Minister Benjamin Netanyahu and Zionist opposition parties.

== Background ==
Haskel was first elected to the Knesset as a member of Likud in 2015. She left Likud in 2020 to join Gideon Sa'ar's New Hope. Following New Hope's decision to merge with Likud, Haskel remained a member of the governing coalition and continued serving as deputy foreign minister, but said that security hawks and economic conservatives had been left "politically homeless".

On 14 July 2026, Haskel resigned as deputy foreign minister after the Knesset approved legislation freezing the arrest and prosecution of Haredi draft evaders. Haskel, who had opposed measures exempting yeshiva students from military service, said that she could no longer support the government's policies on conscription.

== History ==
=== Formation ===
The following day, Haskel announced the establishment of Israel First. She described the party as a political home for Zionist voters who supported a security-oriented, national and liberal right but believed that their views were no longer represented by the existing parties.

Later in July, Haskel began publicly recruiting right-wing political and public figures to join the party, saying that its objective was to establish a broad Zionist government following the 2026 Israeli legislative election.

=== 2026 election ===
Haskel said that she hoped to win at least six Knesset seats, which she believed would allow the party to prevent either the Netanyahu-aligned bloc or the opposition from forming a government dependent respectively on Haredi or Arab parties. She advocated instead for a broad coalition bringing together Likud and Zionist opposition parties. Haskel also said that Israel First would be prepared to enter a government containing parties from both sides of the political divide over Netanyahu. She additionally ruled out a coalition with The Democrats leader Yair Golan.

In August 2026, opinion polling placed Israel First below the electoral threshold, with one poll giving the party 0.6 per cent of the vote.

On 23 August, former American intelligence analyst Jonathan Pollard, who was imprisoned in the United States for passing classified information to Israel, announced that he would run for the Knesset on the Israel First slate. Pollard and Haskel announced his candidacy in a joint statement filmed near the Western Wall in Jerusalem. Haskel described Pollard's addition as a "significant boost" for the party. Pollard will not run as an MK.

The party allied with Ale Yarok, a pro-marijuana legalization party, ahead of the election.

The party won 955 votes in the election.

== Ideology and platform ==
At its launch, Israel First identified five principal areas of policy: national security, a free economy, education, civil liberties and Zionist unity in government.

On security, the party has presented itself as part of the Israeli nationalist right, advocating a strong security policy and emphasizing Israel's ability to defend itself. Haskel has also emphasized strengthening Israeli settlement and maintaining Jerusalem as part of the party's nationalist platform.

Economically, Israel First supports free-market policies. Haskel has described the party as representing working and middle-class Israelis while seeking to reduce the influence of sectoral political interests.

The party supports expanding civil liberties and has described individual freedom as one of its central principles. It also advocates education policies focused on academic excellence.

=== Military conscription ===
Opposition to exemptions from military service for Haredi men was a central issue in the party's formation. Haskel left the government after legislation was passed freezing enforcement measures against Haredi draft evaders, which she argued unfairly placed the burden of military service on Israelis already serving in the Israel Defense Forces.

=== Coalition policy ===
Haskel has described Israel First's principal political objective as the establishment of a "broad Zionist government". Rather than aligning permanently with either the Netanyahu bloc or the opposition, she has proposed using the party's Knesset representation to encourage the two camps to govern together.

Haskel has argued that such an arrangement would reduce the influence of sectoral parties and end the political division centred on Netanyahu. She has said that she would be willing to serve in a government with Netanyahu while also cooperating with Zionist opposition parties.

The Times of Israel described Israel First in August 2026 as part of a developing "third bloc" of centre-right parties seeking to force a compromise between Likud and the Zionist opposition and create a broad unity government.

== Notable members ==
- Sharren Haskel – founder, leader and member of the Knesset for New Hope
- Jonathan Pollard – American-born Israeli spy, convicted and jailed for 30 years for espionage against the United States
- Daniel Farcas - Chilean politician, member of the Chamber of Deputies of Chile (2014-2018)

== Electoral results ==
=== Knesset ===
| Election | Leader | Votes | % | Seats | +/– | Government |
|---|---|---|---|---|---|---|
| 2026 | Sharren Haskel | with Ale Yarok | | 0 / 120 | New | Extra-parliamentary |

== See also ==
- Politics of Israel
