= Hila Vazan =

Israeli journalist and politician

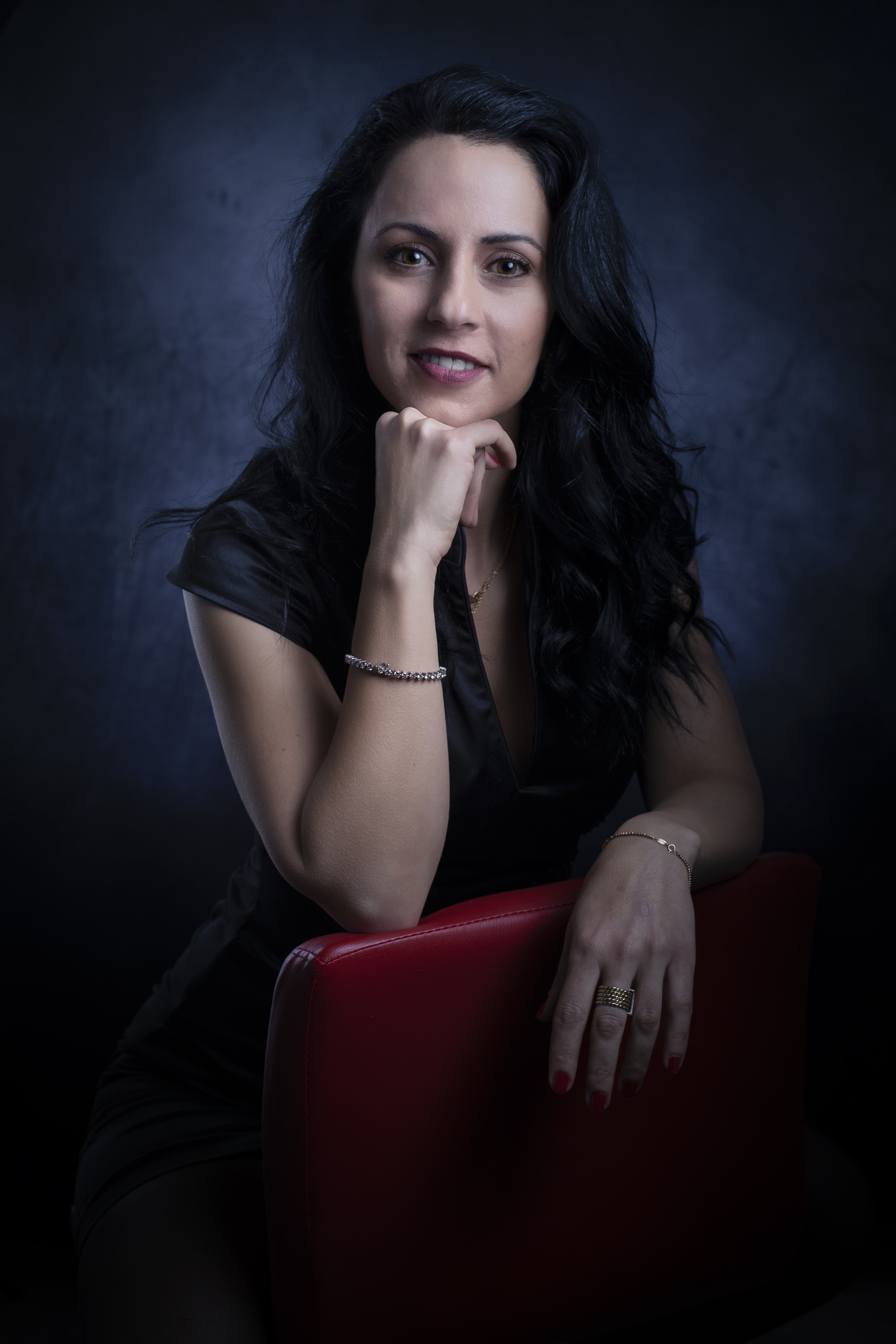
- Vazan in 2022

Faction represented in the Knesset
- 2020–2021: Blue and White

Personal details
- Born: 16 April 1980 (age 45) Bat Yam, Israel

Hila Shai-Vazan (Hebrew: הילה שי-וזאן; born 16 April 1980) is an Israeli journalist and politician. She served as a member of the Knesset for the Blue and White party between June 2020 and January 2021.

== Biography ==
Shai-Vazan was born in Bat Yam in 1980 to Malka and Alex, Libyan Jewish immigrants from Benghazi and Tripoli respectively. She earned a bachelor's degree and master's degree in political science and media at Bar-Ilan University, where she became a spokeswoman for the student union. She established the union's newspaper in 2002, becoming its publisher. In 2007 she joined Yedioth Ahronoth, initially as a correspondent. She moved to Channel 10 News in 2011, before joining Channel 2.

Becoming involved in politics, she managed the election headquarters of the Jewish Home in 2012. In the 2013 local elections she was placed second on the party's list in Modi'in-Maccabim-Re'ut and was elected to the city council as it won two seats. She joined the Israel Resilience Party prior to the April 2019 elections, and when it became part of the Blue and White alliance, she was placed forty-first on the alliance's list. However, it won only 35 seats. She was given the fortieth spot for the September 2019 elections, again failing to win a seat. Given the thirty-ninth slot for the March 2020 elections, she again failed to win a seat, but entered the Knesset on 21 June as a replacement for Yizhar Shai, who had resigned his seat under the Norwegian Law after being appointed to the cabinet. She resigned from the Knesset on 31 January 2021 in order to join New Hope and was replaced by Anat Knafo.
