= Meir Yitzhak Halevi =

Israeli politician

- מאיר יצחק-הלוי
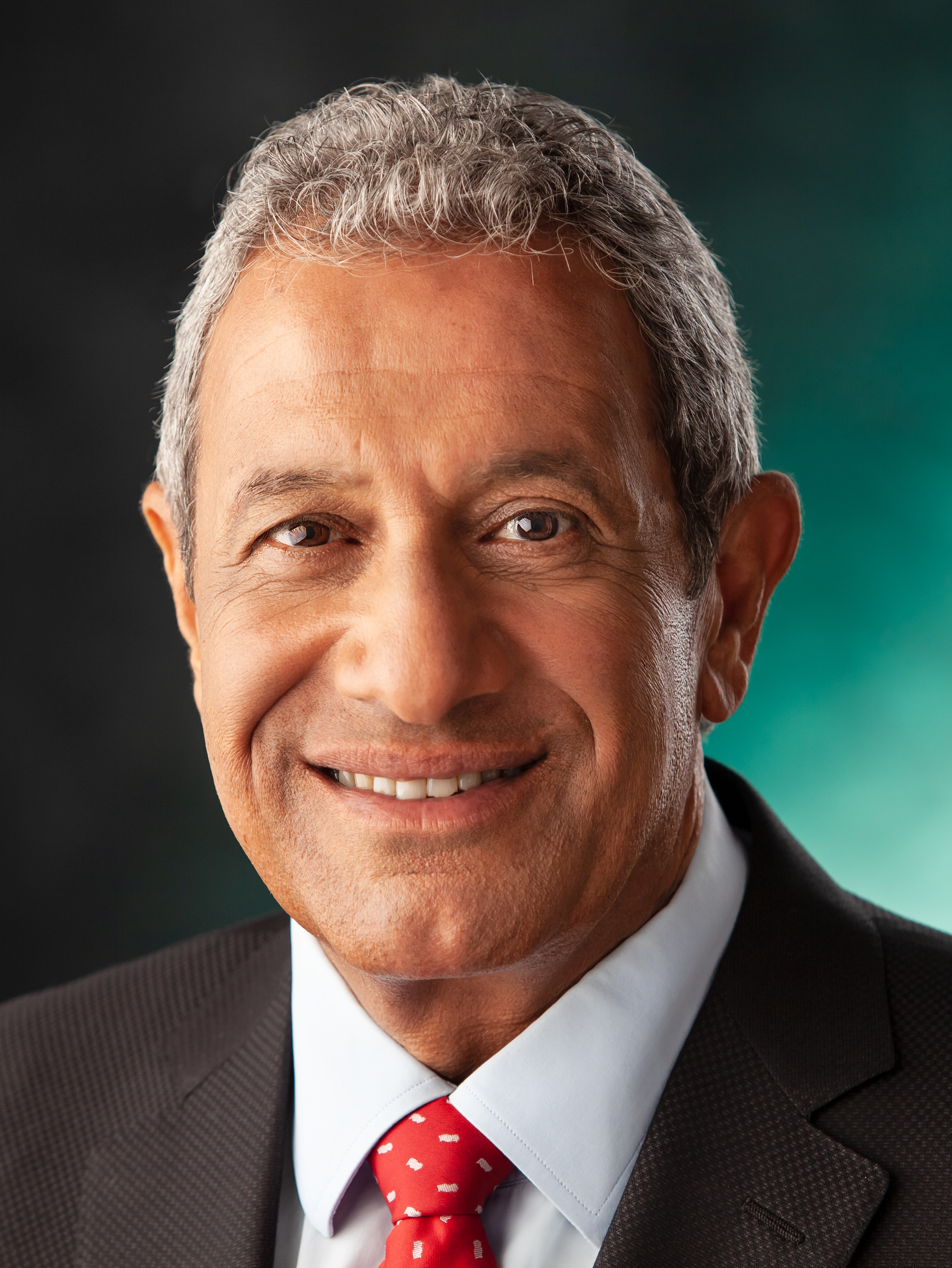

Mayor of Eilat
- In office 2003–2021
- Preceded by: Gabi Kadosh
- Succeeded by: Eli Lankri

Faction represented in the Knesset
- 2021–2022: New Hope

Personal details
- Born: 18 June 1953 (age 73) Jerusalem, Israel

Meir Yitzhak Halevi (Hebrew: מאיר יצחק-הלוי; born 1953) is an Israeli politician who served as a member of the Knesset for the New Hope party and as deputy Minister of Education. He previously served as mayor of Eilat between 2003 and 2021.

== Biography ==
Halevi was born in Jerusalem, in 1953, and is of Yemenite-Jewish descent, as his grandfather was the chief rabbi of Yemen. Halevi fought in the Yom Kippur War.

=== Political career ===
He moved to Eilat in 1978 and ran the community centre and management college in the city. He was elected to the city council in 1993, and ran unsuccessfully for mayor in 1998. Between 1998 and 2003 he served as opposition leader on the council. He won the municipal election in 2003, and following the formation of Kadima, Halevi joined the new party. In the 2008 elections he was re-elected with 50% of the vote.

In 2009 he criticised illegal African immigration into Israel, stating the parts of the city of Eilat "have been conquered by infiltrators".

He gained notoriety for his "City Without Crime" program. He left Likud and joined New Hope in 2020.
