= Sharren Haskel =

Israeli politician (born 1984)

- שרן השכל
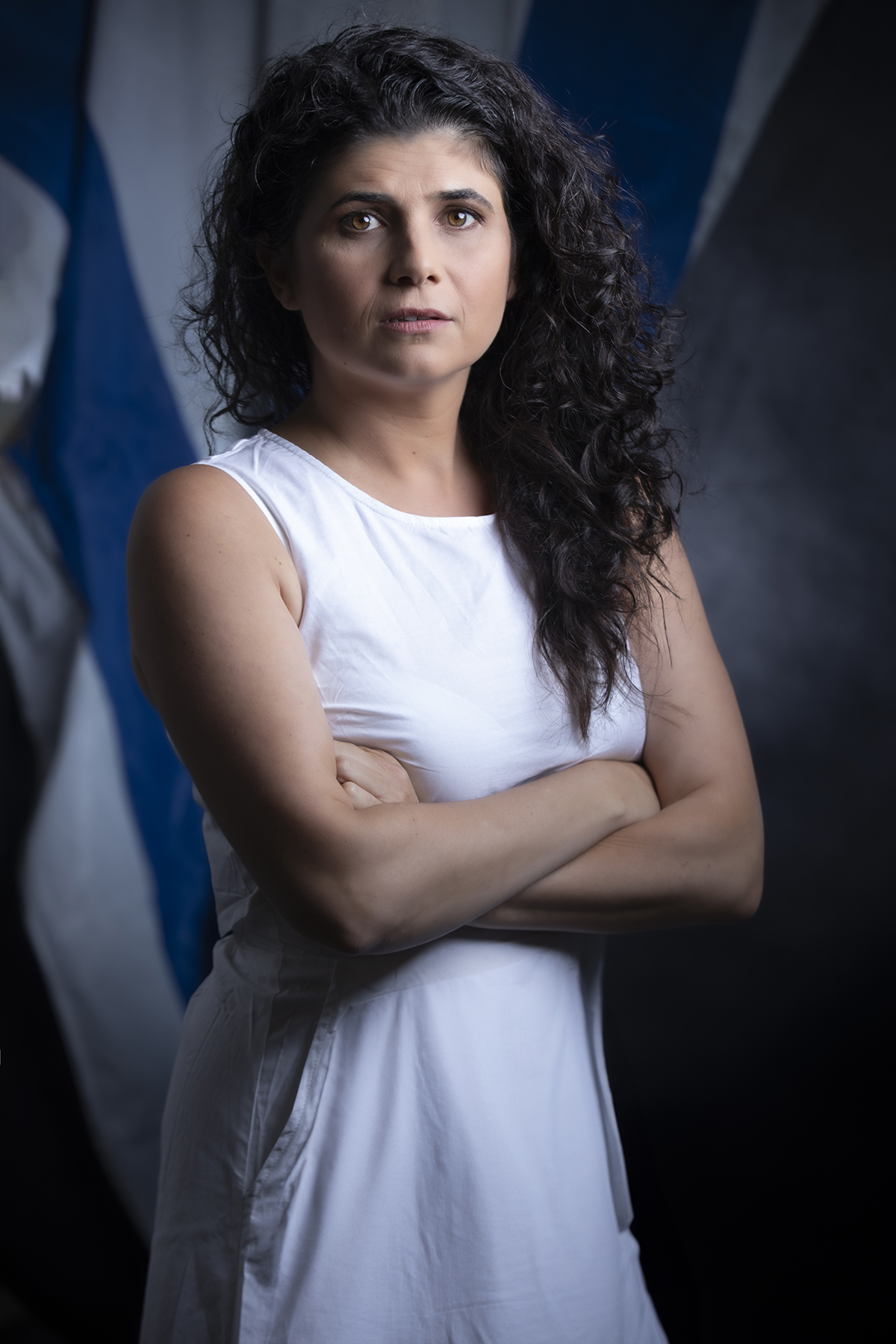
- Haskel in September 2023

Faction represented in the Knesset
- 2015–2020: Likud
- 2021–2022: New Hope
- 2022–2024: National Unity
- 2024–2026: New Hope

Personal details
- Born: Sharren Miriam Haskel; 4 March 1984 (age 42) Toronto, Ontario, Canada
- Citizenship: Israel
- Spouse: Eyal Harpaz
- Children: 3
- Education: Open University of Israel

Sharren Miriam Haskel-Harpaz (Hebrew: שָׁרֶן הַשְׂכֵּל; born 4 March 1984) is a Canadian-born Israeli politician who served as the Deputy Minister of Foreign Affairs. Haskel resigned from this position in July 2026. She was a member of the Knesset for the New Hope party, having previously served as a member of the National Unity Party, an earlier period in New Hope, and Likud. When she was first elected, she was the youngest member of Likud and the second youngest member of the 20th Knesset. She launched the Israel First party for the 2026 Israeli legislative election.

== Early life ==
Sharren Haskel was born in Toronto, Ontario, Canada to a Jewish family, the middle of three sisters. Her father, Amir, was born in Israel, and is from a family of Palmach veterans from moshav Tzofit. Her mother, Fabienne, was born in Morocco. Amir and Fabienne met in Paris and moved to Toronto after Fabienne received a job offer as an English teacher. Her family moved to Israel a year after her birth. She was raised in Kfar Saba and studied theatre at Katznelson High School, where she was a Scouts leader, and later transferred to Ankori High School, where she studied cinema. At the age of 18, Haskel enlisted in the Israel Border Police. According to Haskel, the Second Intifada, during which she served in the Border Police operating checkpoints and attending home demolitions and demonstrations, narrowly escaped two suicide bombings on Israeli buses, and lost two friends to terrorist attacks, helped shape her ideology.

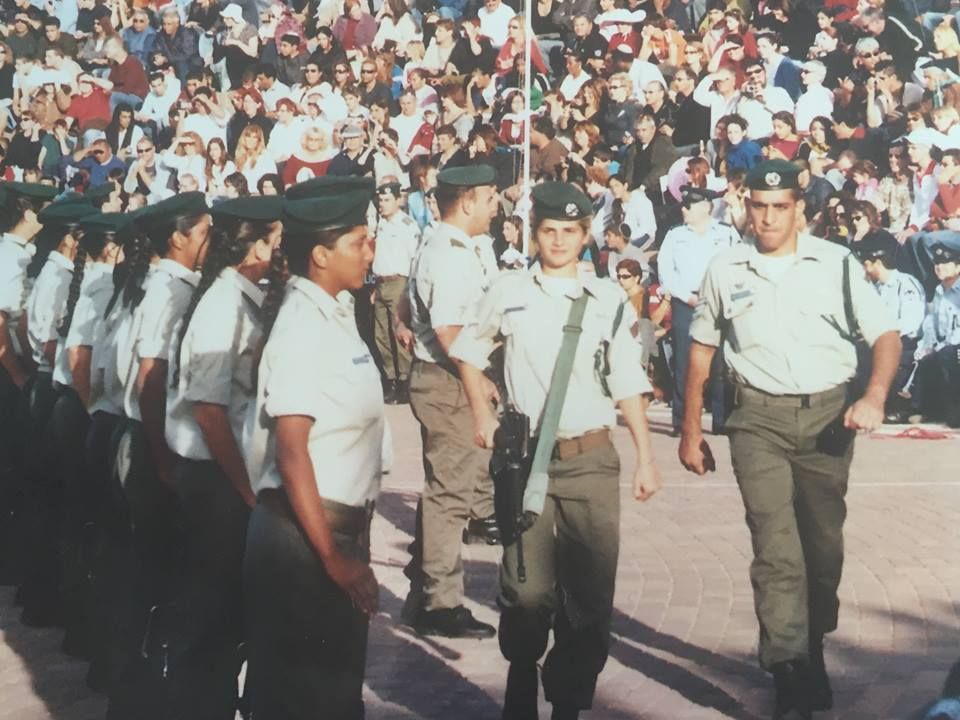
Haskel being promoted to sergeant after completing her officers' training course

After being discharged from the Border Police, Haskel studied for a year in the United States, and then lived in Australia for six years. She graduated from AVT Australia's program for veterinary nursing. Haskel completed her bachelor's degree in political science and international relations at the Open University of Israel, where she was on the debate team. In 2014, Haskel won the Israeli National Champion Debate for Juniors. She is also an alumna of the Jewish Statesmanship Center in Public Policy.

== Social activism ==
Haskel lived in Australia for six years where she worked as a veterinary nurse in Bondi Vet Animal Hospital, and volunteered most of her time to WIRES, an organization that rescues wild animals, treats them, and releases them back into the wild.

She is active on environmental and animal rights issues, with a particular focus on water pollution coming out of areas under the control of the Palestinian Authority. Haskel supports de-criminalization of cannabis, and is an advocate for medical cannabis usage.

Haskel has also expressed support for same-sex marriage to be legalised inside Israel.

== Political career ==
In 2013, Haskel attempted to win a council seat in Kfar Saba's local election. Although she lost, she continued to volunteer her time as an activist in the environmental committee at Kfar Saba city hall.

=== Likud ===
Prior to the 2015 Knesset elections she was placed 31st on the Likud list. Although she failed to enter the Knesset when Likud won 30 seats, she became an MK in 2015 as a replacement for Danny Danon following his appointment as Israel's envoy to the United Nations on 14 August 2015.

Haskel heads the LGBT Knesset caucus, yet in 2016 she voted against the bills purporting to advance gay rights, proposed by Zionist Union and Yesh Atid: recognition of a bereaved widower in same sex couples, a bill banning conversion therapy attempting to convert gays to heterosexuals, a bill to recognize a same-sex marriage contract and a bill to train health professionals to deal with gender and sexual inclination issues.

On 15 December 2019, Haskel endorsed Gideon Sa'ar in the primary for Likud party leadership.

=== New Hope ===
On 23 December 2020 she announced that she would join Sa'ar's new party, New Hope. She was placed fifth on the New Hope list for the March 2021 elections and was again elected to the Knesset as New Hope won six seats.

In the elections to the twenty-fifth Knesset, she was placed 11th in the National Unity list. The list received 12 mandates and Haskel was thus sworn into the Knesset for the fifth time.

In November 2024, Haskel was expected to be sworn in as the Deputy Minister of Foreign Affairs, after Sa'ar signed an agreement with Prime Minister Benjamin Netanyahu to enter the government.

A classical liberal, Haskel is a supporter of free markets and civil liberties. She was the legislature's primary proponent of cannabis legalization.

She opposed Sa'ar's 2025 move to rejoin Likud and has indicated that she will not do so, claiming that this move has left security hawks and economic conservatives "politically homeless". Haskel undertook an 80-km march in December 2025 from Kfar Saba to Jerusalem to protest a bill on Haredi conscription that is under consideration by the Knesset's Foreign Affairs and Defense Committee.

On 14 July 2026, Haskel resigned as the deputy foreign minister over the passage of a bill that stopped the arrest of Haredi conscription evaders, saying that she can no longer support the government's policies on Haredi conscription.

=== Israel First ===
The next day, Haskel announced the formation of a new party called Israel First (Hebrew: ישראל תחילה, romanized: Yisrael Tachila), which supports nationalist security policies and liberal economic policies. The party platform outlined five policy areas, namely national security, free economy, education, civil liberty, and Zionist unity in government.

In August 2026, opinion polling placed Israel First below the electoral threshold, with one poll giving the party 0.6% of vote share. As a result, the party has allied with Ale Yarok, a pro-marijuana legalization party, ahead of the election in an effort to pass the threshold.

== Personal life ==
She speaks English, Hebrew, and French.

Haskel is married to Eyal Harpaz and has three children, a daughter born in 2020 and twin girls born in 2022.

On 3 July 2024 Haskel shared that her 88-year-old grandmother was violently attacked in France in an antisemitic incident. The attackers, who noticed her Star of David necklace, struck her in the face and shouted antisemitic slurs. Haskel criticized the rise of antisemitism in France and urged the Israeli government to act, calling on Jews worldwide to return to Israel.

== Awards and recognition ==
Sharren Haskel received high scores in 2016 and 2017 from the annual "Liberty Index", rating Members of Knesset based on how their legislative activity promotes or suppresses personal freedom and free markets, which is compiled by the New Liberal Movement (described by one of its founders as "much like the better goals of the Tea Party in the United States.") In May 2016 Haskel was recognized by the Jewish Journal in the United States as a leader of new generation of women in politics, mainly for her extensive work around the world to defend Israel’s policy and government.

== Committee assignments ==
Haskel served on these committees for the 20th Knesset:

- Foreign Affairs and Defense Committee
- Special committee for internal and environmental affairs
- Special Committee on Drugs and Alcohol Abuse
- Science and Technology Committee

== See also ==
- Women in Israel
