= New Hope (Israel) =

Israeli political party

New Hope – The United Right תקווה חדשה הימין הממלכתי
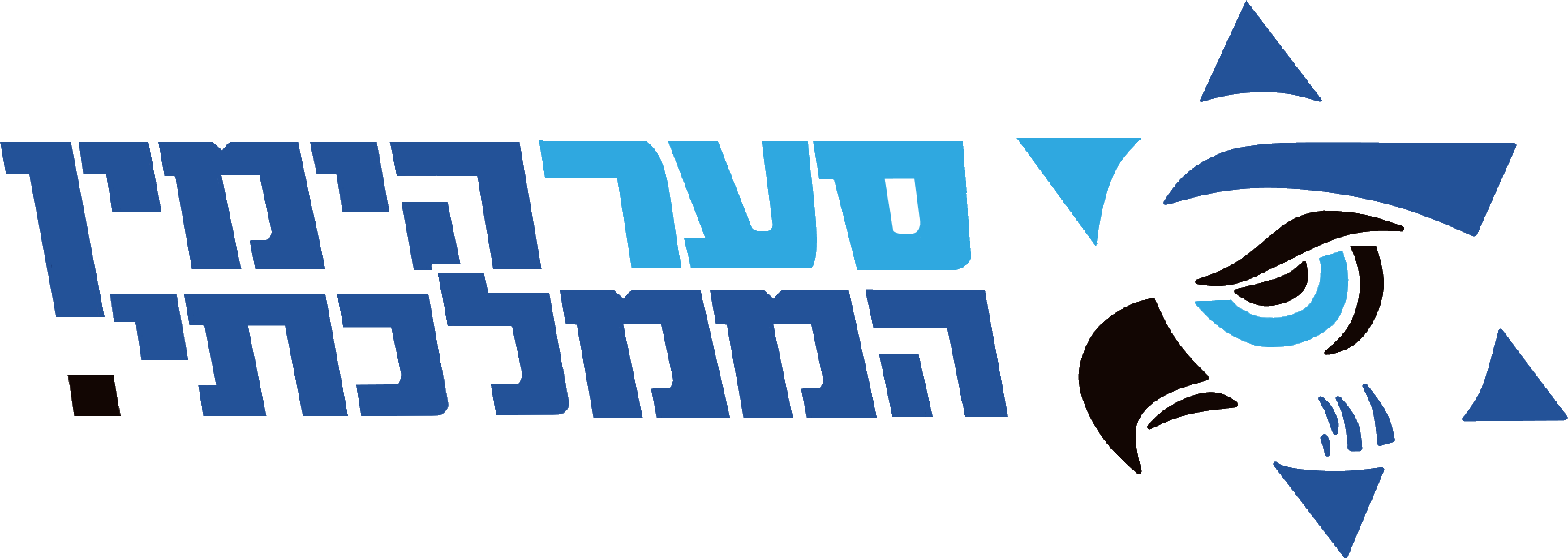
- Leader: Gideon Sa'ar
- Founder: Gideon Sa'ar
- Founded: 8 December 2020
- Dissolved: 13 August 2025
- Split from: Likud; Derekh Eretz
- Merged into: Likud
- Ideology: National liberalism Economic liberalism Zionism
- Political position: Centre-right to right-wing
- National affiliation: National Unity (2022–2024)
- Slogan: The only hope for change

Election symbol
- ת ت

Website
- www.newhope.org.il

New Hope (Hebrew: תִּקְוָוה חֲדָשָׁה, romanized: Tikva Hadasha), officially known as New Hope – The National Right (Hebrew: תִּקְוָוה חֲדָשָׁה הימין הממלכתי, romanized: Tikva Hadasha HaYamin HaMamlakhti), and also translated as New Hope – The United Right, was a centre-right to right-wing, national-liberal political party in Israel.

== History ==
First logo of New Hope, used from 2020 to 2024

The party was formed by former Likud MK and former minister Gideon Sa'ar on 8 December 2020, with Sa'ar subsequently submitting his resignation from the Knesset on 9 December. On the same day, Derekh Eretz MKs Yoaz Hendel and Zvi Hauser announced that they would join New Hope. Likud MKs Yifat Shasha-Biton, Michal Shir, Sharren Haskel, and Ze'ev Elkin later joined as well. Meir Yitzhak Halevi joined the party on 28 December. Benny Begin and Dani Dayan joined on 21 January 2021, whilst MK Hila Vazan joined on 31 January.

The party signed a surplus-vote agreement with Yamina on 4 January 2021.

On 10 July 2022, New Hope formed a joint list with Blue and White, led by Benny Gantz, ahead of the upcoming legislative election. The next month, the name of the joint list, National Unity, was announced.

In October 2023, National Unity joined the Thirty-seventh government of Israel and the Israeli war cabinet in the aftermath of the 2023 Hamas-led attack on Israel. Sa'ar announced on 12 March 2024 that New Hope would again be an independent faction, which was approved by the Knesset House committee the following night. Sa'ar stated on 16 March that his party would resign from the government and join the opposition if Prime Minister Benjamin Netanyahu did not appoint him to the Israeli war cabinet. Sa'ar announced on 25 March that his party had resigned from the government. The party rejoined the Netanyahu government in September 2024, with Sa'ar joining the cabinet as Foreign Minister. The party subsequently signed a merger agreement with Likud in March 2025, which will go into effect before the next election. The Likud Central Committee approved New Hope's merger back into the party in August 2025.

The party merger has not been approved by the House Committee as of July 2026.

In July 2026, MK Sharren Haskel resigned as the Deputy Minister of Foreign Affairs due to opposition to a bill that stopped the arrest of those evading Haredi conscription. The next day, she announced she was forming a new party, called Israel First.

Sa'ar and Elkin were placed on the Likud list ahead of the 2026 Israeli legislative election.

== Policy ==
New Hope sees the State of Israel as the nation state of the Jewish people and sees importance in military, economic, technological, research, settlement aspects of the state, with support for Jewish immigration to Israel. The party sees social divisions in Israel as problematic and promises to work for reconciliation and connection between parts of the nation.

On social issues, the party advocates for legalisation of cannabis and LGBT rights.

=== Financial policy ===
The party supports a partially mixed economy with a strong and partially subsidized capitalist focus. It advocates an expansion of the technological sector and of Israel's infrastructure, as well as supporting a reduction in the size of the country's bureaucracy. It also supports an expansion of Israel's social safety net, and grants for small businesses.

=== Government reform ===
New Hope supports term limits, with a proposal to limit the tenure of a prime minister to eight years. In addition, their platform includes a proposal to elect the Knesset via mixed-member representation.

The party is also interested in increasing the powers of local government at the expense of the powers of the central government.

== Leaders ==
Leader	Took office	Left office
Gideon Sa'ar	2020	2025

== Election results ==
Election	Leader	Votes	%	Seats	+/–	Status
2021	Gideon Sa'ar	209,137	4.74	6 / 120	New	Coalition
2022	Gideon Sa'ar	Part of National Unity		4 / 120	▼2	Opposition (2022–Oct 2023)
2022	Gideon Sa'ar	Part of National Unity		4 / 120	▼2	Coalition (Oct 2023–Mar. 2024)
2022	Gideon Sa'ar	Part of National Unity		4 / 120	▼2	Opposition (Mar. 2024–Sep. 2024)
2022	Gideon Sa'ar	Part of National Unity		4 / 120	▼2	Coalition (Sep. 2024–2025)

== Knesset members ==
Knesset	Seats	Members
24th	6	Gideon Sa'ar (Note: Replaced by Michal Shir on 9 July 2021, then by Michel Buskila on 2 August 2022), Yifat Shasha-Biton, Ze'ev Elkin (Note: Replaced by Meir Yitzhak Halevi on 15 June 2021), Sharren Haskel, Benny Begin
24th	6	Derekh Eretz: Yoaz Hendel (Note: Replaced by Zvi Hauser on 15 June 2021)
25th	4	Gideon Sa'ar (Note: Replaced by Akram Hasson on 10 July 2025), Yifat Shasha-Biton (Note: Replaced by Michel Buskila on 5 July 2024), Ze'ev Elkin, Sharren Haskel
