= Michal Shir =

Israeli politician (born 1979)

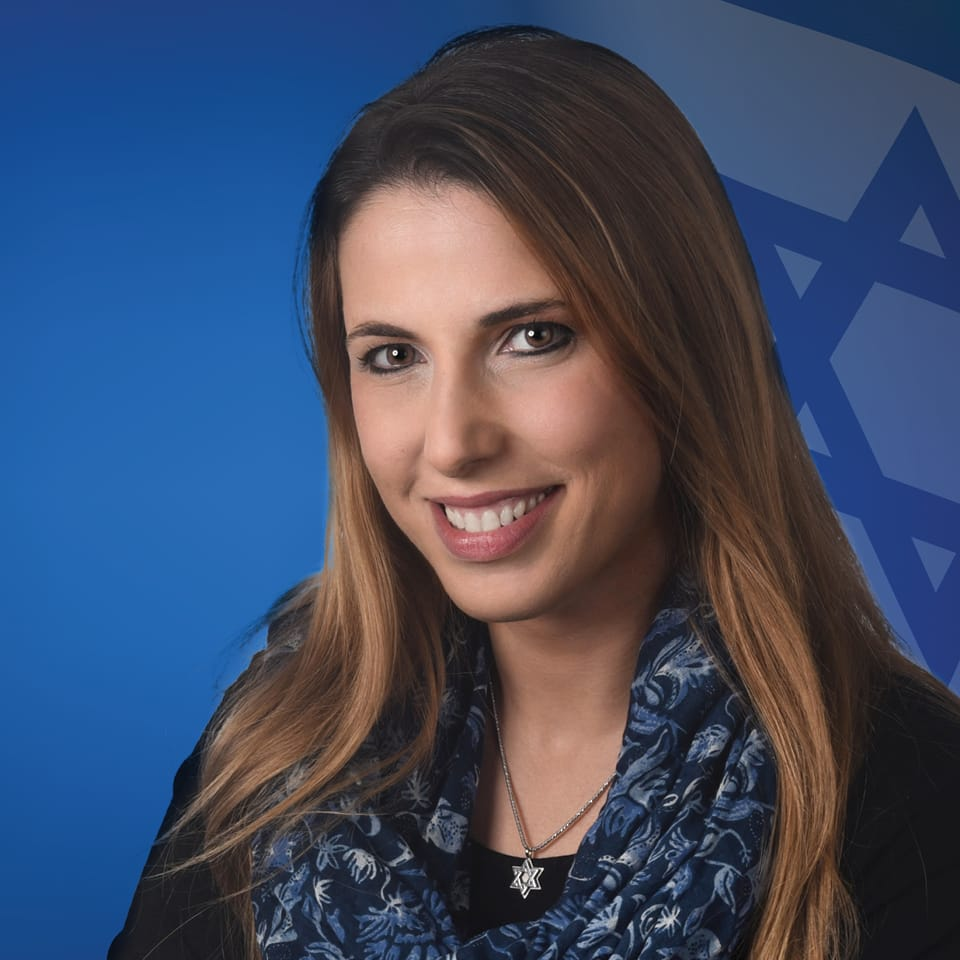
- Shir in 2019

Faction represented in the Knesset
- 2019–2020: Likud
- 2021–2022: New Hope
- 2022–2026: Yesh Atid

Personal details
- Born: 18 November 1979 (age 46) Tel Aviv, Israel

Michal Shir Segman (Hebrew: מיכל שיר סגמן; born 18 November 1979) is an Israeli politician. She was a member of the Knesset for Yesh Atid from 2022 to 2026, previously served as an MK for New Hope from 2021 to 2022 and for Likud between 2019 and 2020.

== Biography ==
Shir was born in Tel Aviv, the daughter of Michael Shir and Gracia Shir (née Saada). Her father, a writer and the founder of the Etzbeoni children's newspaper, was a Polish Jew whose family moved to Israel when he was two years old. Her mother was a Syrian Jew born in Syria.

She grew up in Givatayim and attended Shimon Ben Zvi High School. She joined Likud at the age of 14, and was involved in the establishment of the Ma'ale Yisrael settlement outpost. During her national service, she served in the Bahad 12 training base and then studied for a BA in political science at Bar-Ilan University.

Shir worked with Gideon Sa'ar when he was Likud chairman during the party's time in opposition between 2006 and 2009, and when he became Minister of Education in 2009. She was placed twenty-ninth on the Likud list for the April 2019 elections, a slot reserved for representative of Tel Aviv District. She was elected to the Knesset as Likud won 36 seats, and was subsequently re-elected in September 2019 and 2020.

On 16 July 2020 she made headlines by criticizing Prime Minister Netanyahu's response to the COVID-19 pandemic. MK Shir said "I am a proud Likud member," but added that Netanyahu should accept criticism without "accusing anyone who doubts or expresses concern, of being a radical or a leftist." In December 2020, she announced that she would join Sa'ar's new party, New Hope and resigned from the Knesset. Placed ninth on the New Hope list for the 2021 elections, she missed out on a seat as New Hope won six seats. However, she re-entered the Knesset in July 2021 as a replacement for Sa'ar, when he gave up his seat under the Norwegian Law. On 31 July, ahead of the 2022 Knesset elections, Shir left New Hope and joined the Yesh Atid party under Yair Lapid, resigning from the Knesset in order to run with her new party. She was placed thirteenth on the Yesh Atid list, and re-elected as the party won 24 seats.

She announced in early September 2026 that she would not run in the 2026 Israeli legislative election.

== Personal life ==
Shir is married and has 2 children.
