= Yifat Shasha-Biton =

Israeli politician (born 1973)

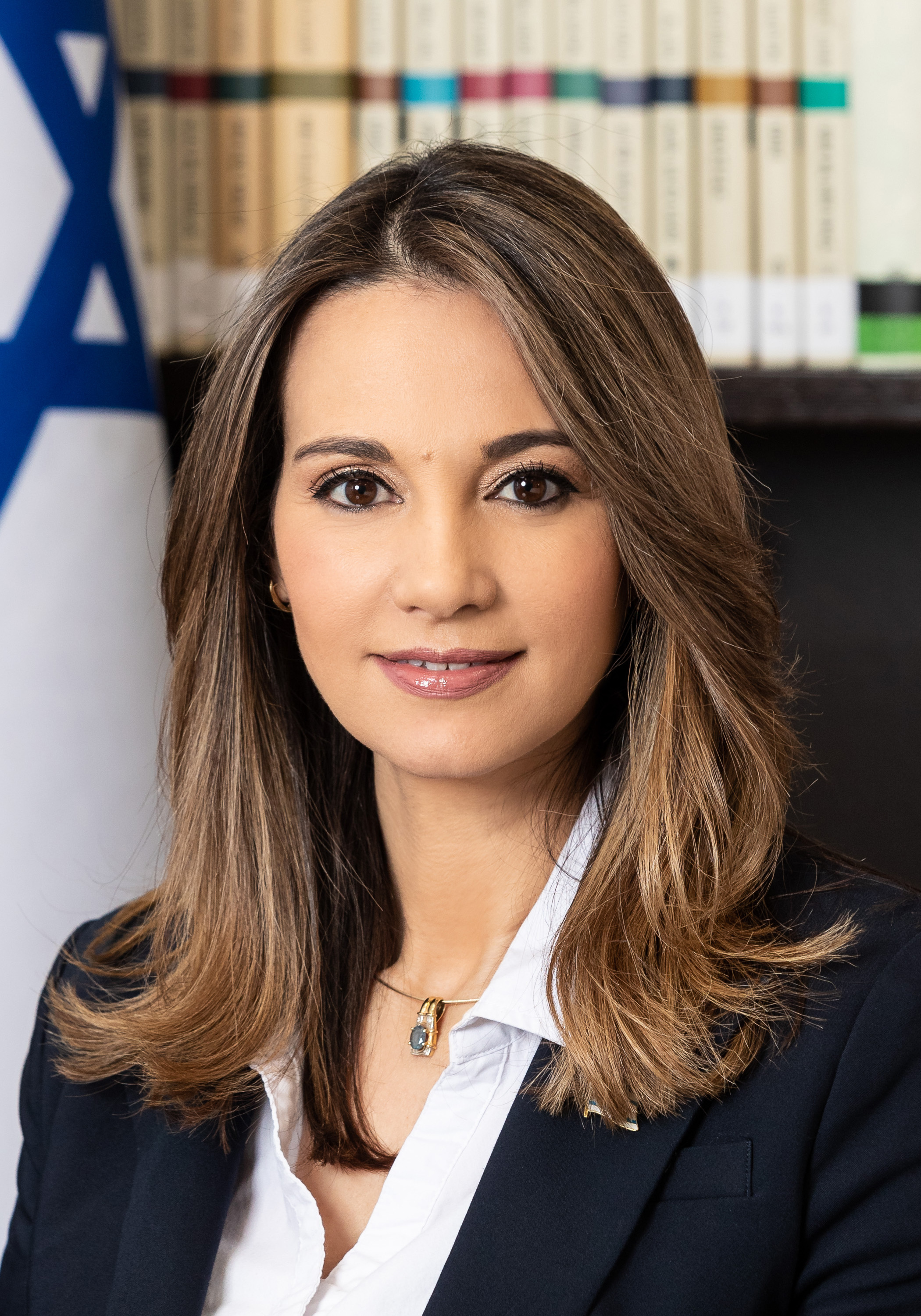
- Shasha-Biton in 2022

Ministerial roles
- 2019–2020: Minister of Construction & Housing
- 2021–2022: Minister of Education
- 2023–2024: Minister without portfolio

Faction represented in the Knesset
- 2015–2019: Kulanu
- 2019–2021: Likud
- 2021–2022: New Hope
- 2022–2024: National Unity
- 2024: New Hope

Personal details
- Born: 23 May 1973 (age 53) Kiryat Shmona, Israel

Yifat Shasha-Biton (Hebrew: יִפְעָת שָׁאשָׁא־בִּיטוֹן; born 23 May 1973) is an Israeli educator and politician who served as Minister of Education between 2021 and 2022. She also served as a Member of the Knesset between 2015 and 2024, as minister without portfolio between 2023 and 2024, and as Minister of Construction and Housing from 2019 to 2020.

== Biography ==
Yifat Shasha-Biton was born in Kiryat Shmona in 1973 to Rachel, a nurse born in Morocco and Moshe David, the owner of a transportation company born in Iraq. She attended the Darca Danciger high school in Kiryat Shmona.

In 2002 she received her doctorate in education from the University of Haifa, having already obtained bachelor's and master's degrees in education at the same university. She wrote her doctoral dissertation on how education affects the understanding of the concept of peace among Israeli and Palestinian students.

Shasha-Biton lived in Kiryat Shmona for much of her life and raised three children there with her husband. As of 2018, she is a resident of Zikhron Ya'akov.

== Academic and political career ==
Shasha-Biton became Vice President of Ohalo College, a teacher training college in Katzrin, and was also a member of the board at Tel-Hai Academic College.

In 2008 she ran for mayor of Kiryat Shmona, and was appointed Deputy Mayor and head of the Education and Youth department at the City Council. In the 2013 local elections she was elected to the City Council. Prior to the 2015 elections she joined the new Kulanu party, and was placed seventh on its list. She was elected to the Knesset as the party won ten seats.

After being elected to the 20th Knesset, Shasha-Biton became chair of the Special Committee for the Rights of the Child. The Special Committee for the Rights of the Child dealt with daycare and preschool supervision, summer employment of youth, adoption, violence in schools, and sexual exploitation of children. In early 2016 she held discussions with child advocates, including "Lo Tishtok" (Thou Shalt Not Be Silent), a group offering support to ultra-Orthodox victims of sexual abuse. In response to studies about child abuse, Shasha-Biton has stated: "To end the epidemic of sexual abuse of minors, we must act systemically to raise awareness among parents and children; to provide tools to educators to identify children who were harmed; and improve the care and support to the victims and their families. In addition, changes must be made in legislation and law enforcement to bring those who harm to justice." In the 20th Knesset, Shasha-Biton also chaired the Lobby for the Status of Teachers in Israel and the Lobby for Border Settlements - Confrontation Line. She was a member of the Science and Technology Committee, the Subcommittee on Space, and was part of the Lobby for Distributive Justice, the Lobby for Promoting a Healthy Body Image among Youth, the Lobby for Women in Business and the Lobby for Narrowing Gaps in Education.

In January 2019 Shasha-Biton was appointed Minister of Construction and Housing after the incumbent, Kulanu colleague Yoav Gallant, left the party and changed portfolios. She was placed third on the Kulanu list for the April 2019 elections, and was re-elected as the party won four seats. The party subsequently merged into Likud and she was re-elected on the Likud list in the September 2019 elections. In January 2020 she was nominated for Minister of Labor, Welfare and Social Services, but her nomination was put on hold until the Knesset could approve it. When a new government was formed in May 2020, she was not included in the new cabinet. She took a position serving as Knesset Coronavirus chairwoman.

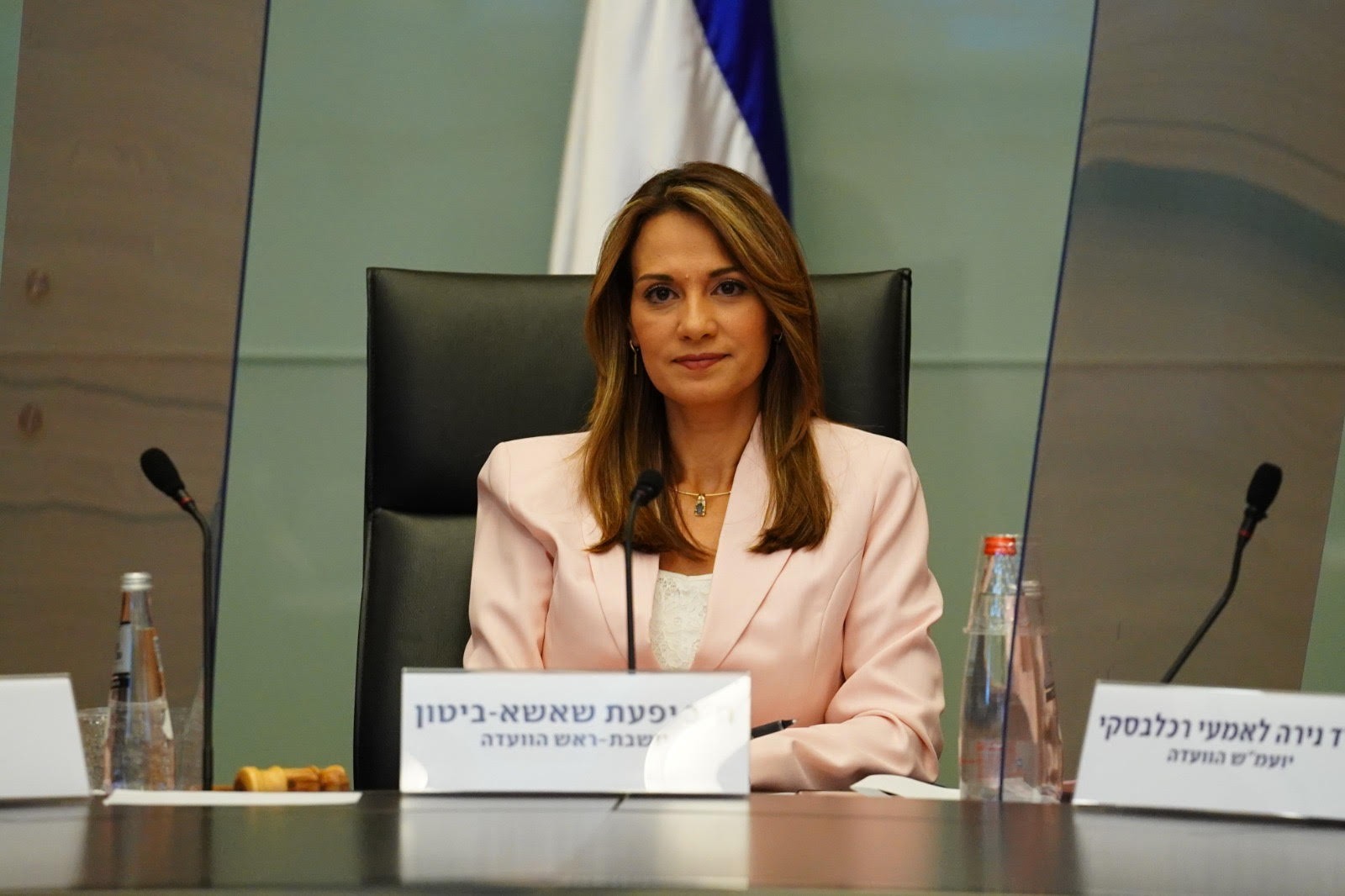
Yifat Shasha-Biton, Chairs the COVID-19 Committee in the 23rd Knesset

On 13 July 2020, she voted to reverse the government decision to shutter pools and gyms because of fears of contagion from the COVID-19 pandemic. Channel 12 reported that Likud coalition whip Miki Zohar told her: "You are finished in the Likud party." He added that she would be removed as chairwoman from the COVID-19 committee. However, Likud MK Gideon Sa'ar expressed his support for her and said decisions about closings should be made based on data and not because of threats. In December 2020, she announced that she would join Sa'ar's new party, New Hope. She was placed second on the list for the March 2021 elections and retained her seat in the Knesset as New Hope won six seats.

On 13 June 2021, she was appointed as Minister of Education in the thirty-sixth government of Israel. She announced that she wished to implement changes in the school week so that high school students in Israel would study for five days a week, instead of six, and elementary school students would also study five days a week but with enrichment classes on Friday. Shasha-Biton stated that the proposed change would take time to implement.

In 2021 Oded Goldreich was selected by an Israel Prize committee to win the Israel Prize in mathematics. After the Supreme Court voided Yoav Gallant's decision to deny Goldreich the Israel Prize and ruled that the matter should be resolved by Shasha-Biton, in November 2021, she announced that she would block Goldreich from receiving the prize. In an editorial, the Jerusalem Post wrote that Goldreich's "[c]alling for the boycott of professional colleagues ... is a red line that shouldn't be crossed". A Haaretz editorial said that Shasha-Biton's decision meant "the most prestigious prize awarded by Israel will not be the mark of scientific excellence but of loyalty to the government".

On 12 October 2023, she was sworn in as a minister without portfolio following the outbreak of the Gaza war. She promptly resigned alongside the rest of New Hope on 25 March 2024. On 2 July, Biton announced her resignation from the Knesset and retirement from politics.
