= Kaminitz Law =

Kaminitz Law (Hebrew: חוק קמיניץ), formally Amendment No. 116 to the Planning and Building Law, is an Israeli law passed in 2017 headed by deputy Attorney General Erez Kaminitz that cracked down on illegal construction with stronger administrative enforcement and more severe punishments for violations. However, there was also criticism that this law was directed against the Arab sector and made building housing more difficult in these areas.

== History ==
The bill was first proposed by Erez Kaminitz and submitted to the 20th Knesset. On 1 January 2016, the bill passed first reading with majority support. Then on 5 April 2017, the bill passed second and third readings and officially became law.

In November 2020, attorney general Avichai Mandelblit announced a change in enforcement due to protests from Arab citizens against the law, where the law would not be prioritized in enforcement especially for old populated houses that do not endanger planning.
