= Shoshana Strook =

Israeli who made abuse allegations

- שושנה סטרוק
- Died: March 14, 2026; Amirim, Israel
- Burial place: Old Jewish cemetery, Hebron
- Education: Ben-Gurion University of the Negev
- Known for: Allegations of abuse against her parents
- Mother: Orit Strook

Shoshana Strook (Hebrew: שושנה סטרוק) was the daughter of Israeli Knesset member (MK) Orit Strook. In 2025, she told the police that her parents had subjected her to sexual and ritual abuse. The authorities put her complaint and the investigation under a gag order. Strook continued to make accusations against her parents on social media, and said that she was afraid for her life.

On 15 March 2026 it was announced that Strook had been found dead; Israeli police said they did not suspect criminal involvement. According to the police, they did not find any evidence for her claims in their investigation; some details of their investigation remain under a gag order. Several journalists and other public figures have disputed Strook's allegations. Friends of Strook, activists, and women's organizations in the country have called for investigations of her allegations and her death.

== Early life and education ==
Shoshana Strook was one of eleven children born to Orit and Avraham Strook. She was raised in the Religious Zionist community and spent much of her youth in Israeli settlements in the West Bank, specifically Hebron. Her mother, Orit Strook, is a leading figure in the Religious Zionist Party and has served as the Minister of Settlements and National Missions.

Strook received a bachelor's degree in psychology and education from Ben-Gurion University of the Negev in 2015. She studied cognitive psychology for a master's degree, but did not complete the program.

== Allegations of abuse ==
In March or April 2025, Strook made a criminal complaint against her parents, alleging that they had sexually abused her. An investigation into the allegations was opened by Lahav 433, and authorities issued a media gag order. According to the The Times of Israel, it was "one of the most sweeping gag orders in recent memory" and the press was not allowed to publish names or details of the allegations.

According to B'Sheva reporter Avishai Grinzaig, the media was aware of Strook's complaint but decided not to publish about it. On 8 April 2025, Strook's allegations were first published by activist Daniel Amram who said the story had been "silenced." On 10 April 2025, Strook publicly posted a video on social media regarding her allegations against her parents. She said that the abuse had been filmed and that she had filed a police report in Italy.

The court reduced the gag order on 10 April 2025, allowing the media to publish some information about the case. The police suspended their investigation into Strook's allegations and did not question her parents due to lack of evidence, but this was not reported publicly due to the gag order. The outlet Haaretz challenged the gag order in court. On 22 April 2025, judge Menachem Mizrahi upheld the gag order to protect the parties involved and adjudicated the allegations to be "extremely thin or non-existent".

Strook continued to post allegations of sexual and ritual abuse on social media, until at least February 2026. She said that her parents had taken her to "pedophile ceremonies" at a young age and that her father had "pimp[ed]" her in Tel Aviv as a teenager. She said that she was forced to undergo conversion therapy and had been raised in a "sadistic cult." According to Strook, the abuse had negatively impacted her mental health, but her claims were still valid. She said that others were trying to suppress her allegations and that she feared for her safety. Additionally, she said that she was not suicidal.

For several years before Strook's police report, ritual abuse allegations have been made in Israel. Israel Hayom published an investigative report about ritual abuse in April 2025. Several hearings about the topic have been held in the Knesset. Strook's allegations were referenced in one of the hearings, and an attempt was made to have Strook testify.

== Death ==
A few weeks before her death, Strook launched a crowdfunding campaign. She requested support from the public because she had left her home out of concern for her safety and did not have stable housing. Strook died on 14 March 2026, and her body was found later that day in a vacation rental in Amirim, Israel. Her death was reported to police by either Magen David Adom or ZAKA. On 15 March 2026, Orit Strook announced her daughter's death in a Facebook post that said: "Updating with a broken heart about the passing of our beloved daughter, Shoshana". The Israel Police opened an investigation into Strook's death but have no suspicion of foul play. News reports said Shoshana had died at 34 or 39 years old. She was buried the evening of 15 March in the Old Jewish Cemetery in Hebron.

=== Reactions ===
The cause of Strook's death and the validity of her allegations have been widely debated and discussed within Israel. Various political figures shared condolences for Strook's death, including Benjamin Netanyahu, Itamar Ben-Gvir, Ofir Sofer, and Aryeh Deri. Alluding to accusations against Strook's family, Finance Minister Bezalel Smotrich said that using her death to "attack and incite" was "vile and despicable". In the week after Strook's death, several protests took place in Haifa and Zion Square in Jerusalem, calling for the authorities to investigate Strook's allegations and death. Protestors held signs reading "We believe you, Shoshana".

In an interview with Israel Hayom, Orit Strook called Shoshana "kind-hearted" and "talented" and said that she had been abused by a man during a trip abroad. Orit and one of Shoshana's brothers said that she had struggled with serious mental illness for several years. Her sister said that many details posted online about Strook after her death were incorrect, including date of birth and medical diagnoses.

Journalists such as Josh Breiner, Avishai Grinzaig, Yair Cherki, Yinon Magal, and Ben Caspit have said that there is no evidence for Strook's allegations. Rabbi Shmuel Eliyahu, who adjudicates cases of sexual abuse on a religious court, stated that none of the allegations of ritual abuse he was aware of had ever been substantiated. Rabbi Nir Menussi said that false memory syndrome could be a factor, referencing the Satanic panic in the United States in the 1980s.

According to Shomrim – The Center for Media and Democracy, Strook's death has drawn attention to the subject of ritual abuse in Israel. In response to the public discourse, the Israeli Society for Sexual Trauma Treatment & Prevention (ISTT), part of the Israeli Medical Association, issued a statement that ritual abuse and sexual abuse by organized networks is a real phenomenon that is often perpetrated by powerful people. MK Adi Azuz called for the government to stop denying the existence of ritual abuse. The Israeli women's rights organization Bonot Alternativa said that it believed Strook's allegations, and urged the government to fulfill Strook's request that they investigate. Friends of Strook, including some who have also reported surviving ritual abuse, have said that Strook did not want to die or was afraid of being killed.

=== Status of gag order ===
The Association of Rape Crisis Centers in Israel and others submitted a request to overturn the gag order. On 15 April 2026, Judge Menachem Mizrahi decreased the scope of the gag order to allow the media to report that the police had investigated Strook's allegations in 2025 and decided against questioning her parents. Additionally, the media could report that the court had ruled against lifting the gag order in April 2025 due to the lack of evidence. In his ruling, Mizrahi said that he had since reviewed an additional report that reaffirmed his opinion of the case. Strook's former attorney criticized Mizrahi's decision and said that he had not spoken to Strook or adequately investigated her claims.
