= Security Cabinet of Israel =

Inner forum of the Israeli Cabinet

The State Security Cabinet (SSC; Hebrew: הקבינט המדיני-ביטחוני, HaKabinet HaMedini-Bithoni), also known as the Ministerial Committee on National Security Affairs (Hebrew: ועדת השרים לענייני ביטחון לאומי, Va'adat HaSarim Le'Inyanei Bitahon leomi) or National Security Affairs Committee (NSAC), is an "Inner Cabinet" within the Israeli Cabinet, headed by the Prime Minister of Israel, with the purpose of outlining a foreign and defense policy and implementing it. This smaller forum of cabinet members is designated to coordinate diplomatic negotiations, and in times of crisis, especially war, it is designed to make quick and effective decisions.

== History ==
The idea of establishing a Security Cabinet was initially part of the Centre Party's platform of 1999 election, chaired by Yitzhak Mordechai. The party offered a new security plan, in which a Security Cabinet would be established for the purpose of implementing an effective peace and security plan. According to their platform, a new council for diplomatic planning and advising would be established, that would be headed by a person appointed by the Prime Minister, who would preside over small professional teams in the relevant fields. Furthermore, they suggested that the Prime Minister, Acting Prime Minister, Vice Prime Minister, the Director-Generals of the Defense, Foreign, and Treasury ministries, as well as the Chief of General Staff, chief of Shin Bet, and the Military Secretary to Prime Minister would take part in the Security Cabinet meetings on a regular basis, and that others presiding over the diplomatic negotiations or any other relevant officials would participate accordingly. The idea behind the Security Cabinet was to create a professional objective advising body to the Cabinet. The members would evaluate different situations, offer alternatives and oversight, and determine positions on the Cabinet and the army.

In practice, the forming of this body was based on section 6 of the "Government Law" of 2001 that stipulated the following:

"The Government shall have a ministers committee composed of: The Prime Minister—chairman, Acting Prime Minister, if such was appointed, Minister of Defence, Minister of Justice, Minister of Foreign Affairs, Minister of Internal Security and the Minister of Finance.

The Government may, upon the proposal of the Prime Minister, coopt an additional members to the committee, provided that the number of its members not aggregate exceeding half of the Cabinet Members."

Concerning the issues to be addressed, the law stipulated that:

(A) The diplomatic-security and settling issues shall be debated within the committee.

(B) The daily agenda of the committee, and the officials to be invited to participate in its meetings shall be determined by the Prime Minister, after consulting with the minister in charge.

(C) The Minister in charge, prior to any decision making, may demand on any matter debated within the committee to be moved to a full Cabinet meeting to be debated and resolved. The aforementioned shall not apply, should the Prime Minister be ascertain, after consulting with the minister in charge, that the circumstances concerning the matter requires an immediate decision or that there are other circumstances that justifies the committee's decision.

=== The "War Cabinet" ===
During Yom Kippur War, a group of ministers was formed arbitrarily, and had assumed responsibility for taking fundamental decisions during that war. This group became known as "The War Cabinet", and later was also nicknamed "Golda's kitchen". The "War Cabinet" had made independent decisions during those emergency times, and the Government had approved those decisions only in retrospect. Against that background, already during those times, the question of the necessity and role of such a cabinet arose. On the other hand, some suggested that the Cabinet members should run the war as they see fit—without the need of getting anybody's approval.

=== 2023 activities ===
The State Security Cabinet formally placed the country under a state of war for the first time since the 1973 Yom Kippur War due to Operation Iron Swords.

The security cabinet was expanded on 12 October, with National Unity MKs Benny Gantz, Gadi Eizenkot, Gideon Sa'ar and Hili Tropper joining as full members and Yifat Shasha-Biton joining as an observer.

== Structure ==
=== Cabinet members ===
- Permanent members:

Appointment by law:

1. Prime Minister: Benjamin Netanyahu, Chairman
2. Minister of Defense: Israel Katz
3. Minister of Foreign Affairs: Gideon Sa'ar
4. Minister of Justice: Yariv Levin
5. Minister of Finance: Bezalel Smotrich
6. Minister of National Security: Itamar Ben-Gvir

Additional members:

1. Minister of Strategic Affairs: Ron Dermer
2. Minister of Energy: Eli Cohen
3. Minister of Agriculture and Food Security: Avi Dichter
4. Minister of Transportation and Road Safety: Miri Regev
5. Additional Minister within Ministry of Finance: Ze'ev Elkin

Observers:

1. Minister of Settlement and National Missions: Orit Strook
2. Minister of Innovation, Science and Technology: Gila Gamliel
3. Ministry for the Development of the Negev, the Galilee and the National Resilience: Yitzhak Wasserlauf
4. Regional Cooperation Minister of Israel and Additional Minister within Ministry of Justice: Dudi Amsalem

=== Permanent Non-Cabinet invitees ===
- Attorney General of Israel: Gali Baharav-Miara
- Chief of The NSC: Tzachi Hanegbi
- Military Secretary to the Prime Minister: Maj. General Roman Gofman
- Military Secretary to the Defense Minister: Brig. Gen. Guy Markizeno
- MK Aryeh Deri
