= Killing of Yemanu Binyamin Zelka =

2026 killing in Petah Tikva, Israel

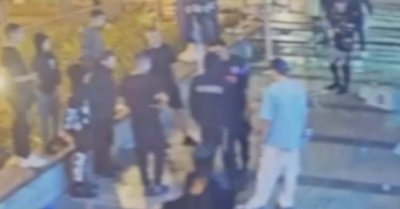
- Surveillance image showing the moments before Zelka's death
- Location: 32°04′26″N 34°52′13″E; Outside the Pizza Hut in Kfar Ganim, Petah Tikva, Israel
- Date: 22 April 2026; 6 months ago 01:00 (Israel Daylight Time, UTC+3)
- Weapon: Knife
- Deaths: 1
- Victim: Yemanu Binyamin Zelka
- Accused: 16
- Charges: 1 person was charged with second degree murder and the others for causing serious bodily harm with intent

On 22 April 2026, 21-year-old Yemanu Binyamin Zelka (Hebrew: ימנו בנימין זלקה) was attacked and stabbed in Petah Tikva, Israel. The attack occurred after he asked a group of teenagers to stop spraying party foam inside the Pizza Hut where he worked. He died the next day. Nineteen suspects between the ages of 12–17 were arrested in connection with the attack. Sixteen of the suspects were indicted on 10 May. The suspect accused of stabbing Zelka was charged with second degree murder, and the other fifteen were charged with causing serious bodily harm with intent.

== Background ==
Yemanu Binyamin Zelka was a 21-year-old Ethiopian-Israeli. When he was one year old, his family immigrated to Israel. He has at least 2 siblings. He attended high school at Amit Eliraz Yeshiva in Petah Tikva and was a graduate of and counselor at Bnei Akiva. According to his parents, he had supported his family financially by working since age 14. Zelka was employed by Pizza Hut in the Kfar Ganim neighborhood of Petah Tikva for 5 years. According to his coworkers, he had advanced from a delivery person to shift supervisor.

Israel experienced 105 murders between 1 January and 24 April 2026. The Times of Israel interpreted these statistics as indication of a crime wave. Additionally, arrests of minors in the Tel Aviv area have increased from 301 in 2022 to 568 in 2025. Cases against minors have increased rom 2,043 in 2022 to 2,084 in 2025. About 80% of the accused in these cases are Israeli citizens. According to Yedioth Ahronoth, cases against minors for serious crimes have increased from a few dozen in the years before 2023 to 109 in 2024.

== Incident ==
The incident occurred on Israel's Independence Day. According to local residents, several fights had already occurred in the immediate area that night, and local police did not intervene.

At approximately 01:00 on 22 April 2026, Zelka asked a group of rowdy teenagers to stop spraying party foam inside the Pizza Hut where he was working. After finishing work, he left the building, and the teenagers attacked him. CCTV footage shows the teenagers encircling Zelka. After one teenager shoves him to the ground, the others hit him. When he tries to leave, they beat him with bottles and throw him against a railing. Someone attempts to intervene and stop the attack. One of the teenagers stabs Zelka. They leave him lying in a pool of blood on the ground. According to the police, the suspects shut off their phones and did not return home in an attempt to evade arrest.

At 01:15, Magen David Adom emergency response received a call about the attack. When they arrived on the scene, Zelka was unconscious and was injured in his legs and abdomen. Zelka was taken to Beilinson Hospital where he died the next day. He was buried at Yarkon Cemetery. Two days after Zelka's death, another Ethiopian-Israeli, Destao Chekol, was stabbed and killed by teenagers.

== Investigation ==
=== Arrests ===
According to the local police, they misinterpreted the incident as a fight and did not notify the serious crimes unit until 23 April. On 25 April the police arrested seven suspects between the ages of 12–17. According to the police, they used security footage to locate the suspects. Two of the suspects, who are 12 years old, were released on house arrest the same day. The primary suspect, who is 15 years old, was arrested along with his parents who are accused of attempting to prevent his arrest. A CCTV image of him holding a bloody knife was released by Channel 12. In the 2 weeks after Zelka's death, the police continued to make arrests, eventually arresting 19 suspects. According to Haaretz, all of the suspects live in Petah Tikva and several are schoolmates. One is from a crime family; one is the child of an intelligence official. The case is subject to a gag order because it involves minors. The police have stated that they do not want their investigation to have a similar result as the police investigation in the 2022 killing of Yoel Lhanghal.

=== Indictments ===
On 10 May, 16 of the 19 suspects were indicted. The primary suspect was charged with second degree murder and the others with causing serious bodily harm with intent. Other charges faced by some of the teens include: making threats, obstruction of justice, destroying evidence and conspiracy to assault. According to prosecutors, the primary suspect was not charged with first degree murder because there was no indication that the stabbing was premeditated.

According to the indictment, one of the defendants threatened Zelka after he asked them to leave the restaurant for spraying snow spray; one said that he felt disrespected by Zelka, that he planned to stab Zelka, and that he was "ready to go to prison for it." After Zelka left the restaurant, the suspects attacked him, pushing him and hitting him with snow spray cans. The indictment states that the primary suspect watched until he saw that Zelka had started to escape from the group; at that point, the suspect stabbed Zelka in the groin. A few of the defendants continued assaulting Zelka, and he eventually died at the hospital.

The primary suspect confessed to stabbing Zelka in October 2026 but denied that he intended to kill Zelka. He requested that his charges be downgraded to negligent manslaughter.

== Reactions ==
=== Family ===
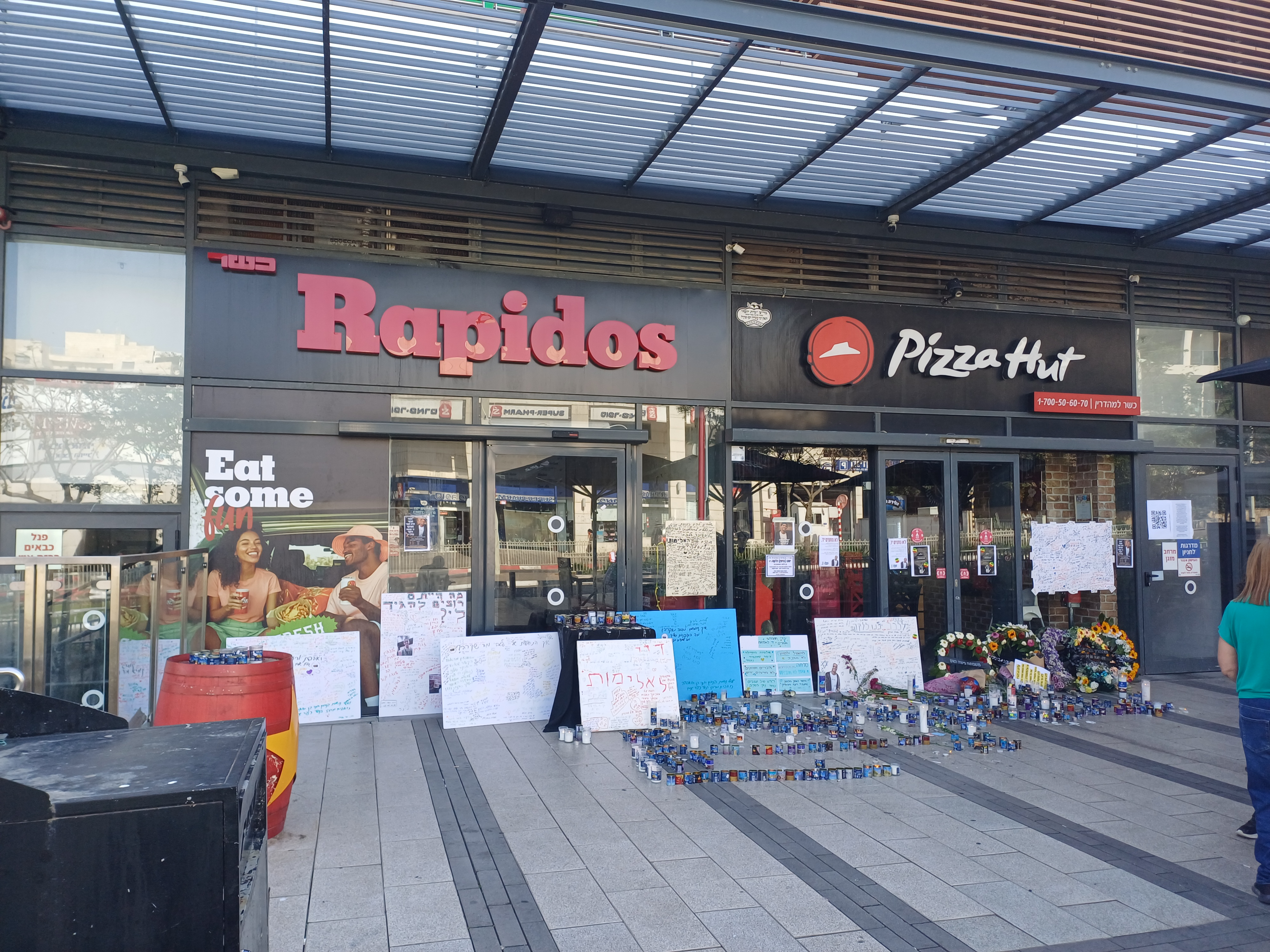
Messages left outside the Pizza Hut where Zelka worked

Zelka's family described him as a "pure, innocent kid". His sister pointed to police negligence as the cause of her brother's death and denied that racism against Ethiopian Israelis played a role. Zelka's family criticized the indictments as too lenient. They accused the prosecution of protecting the suspects and the primary suspect of tampering with evidence. They called for stricter punishments in order to prevent additional murders.

=== Public response ===
Mourners placed flowers, messages, and candles at the site of the attack. On 25 April, hundreds of people protested in Goren Square outside the Pizza Hut, condemning National Security Minister Itamar Ben Gvir and the Israel Police for their response to crime in the area. They chanted “Ben Gvir, wake up". The rally was attended by Benny Gantz and MK Pnina Tamano-Shata. Tamano-Shata stated that "Blood is being spilled in the streets for no reason" and that the police "did nothing" to respond to Zelka's death for three days.

Pizza Hut pledged to continue paying Zelka's salary to his family. As of 27 April, 1.5 million NIS was crowdfunded for his family. On 28 April, a group of mostly Ethiopian-Israeli protesters chanted: “Ethiopian blood is not cheap” outside the court. On 9 May, protesters outside the court criticized the anticipated indictments as too lenient. Due to public outcry, the Petah Tikva school district did not allow 2 of the accused to return for the subsequent semester.

Plaque dedicated to Zelka outside the Pizza Hut where he worked

=== Responses from politicians ===
Condolences were offered by Petah Tikva mayor Rami Greenberg, First Lady Michal Herzog, and Bnei Akiva.

Opposition politicians such as Meirav Ben-Ari, Gilad Kariv, and Naftali Bennett criticized the police as incompetent. The Haaretz editorial board blamed Ben-Gvir for undermining the police and said that police negligence had led to "teenagers who act like criminals in every respect".

Israel’s Prime Minister Benjamin Netanyahu denounced the attack, stating that it should be punished and that the educational system should reinforce that such a crime in unacceptable. He met with Education Minister Yoav Kisch and National Security Minister Itamar Ben Gvir to discuss how to prevent violence among youth. According to The Times of Israel, Netanyahu appeared to condemn the protests in support of Zelka as "wild incitement". Ben Gvir pledged to bring the murderers to justice and increase the number of police. He called for improved education against violence, stating that "we can’t station a police officer at every pizzeria". The chief of Israel Police, Danny Levy, characterized the killing of Zelka as an example of "spontaneous, unpredictable incidents — ones that are difficult and sometimes impossible to prevent in advance".

On 4 May, a meeting was held in the Knesset to discuss efforts to curb youth violence. At the meeting, Likud member and Herzliya council member Rafi Chaim-Kedoshim stated that the accused teenagers "didn’t mean to kill [Zelka], just to stab him." Several opposition members, including Gilad Kariv and Naama Lazimi, denounced Chaim-Kedoshim's presence at the meeting because of his multiple convictions for violent crimes. His statement was condemned by MK Pnina Tamano-Shata and Naftali Bennet.
