= Léon Ashkenazi =

French Rabbi (1922–1996)

Yehuda Léon Askénazi
- يهودا ليون اشكنازي
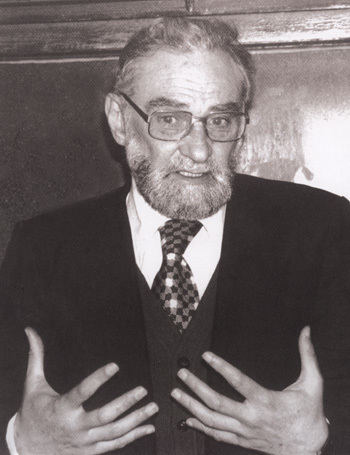
- Born: Rav Yehuda Leon Ashkenazi; June 21, 1922; Oran, Algeria
- Died: October 21, 1996 (aged 74); Jerusalem, Israel
- Education: University of Algiers; Sorbonne

Rav Yehuda Leon Ashkenazi (French: Léon Askénazi, Arabic: يهودا ليون اشكنازي; Hebrew: יהודא ליאון אשכנזי), also known as Manitou (June 21, 1922 – October 21, 1996), was a Jewish rabbi and educator. He was a spiritual leader of 20th century French Jewry.

== Life and endeavors ==
Rav Ashkenazi was born on June 21, 1922 in Oran, Algeria. His life encompassed two different cultures, which resulted in his ability to bridge Western and Jewish frames of mind.

He was born to Rav David Ashkenazi (Rabbi), the last Chief Rabbi of Algeria, and Rachel Touboul, a descendant of a prestigious Rabbinical line of Spanish kabbalic scholars – one of its ancestors was Rav Yossef Ibn Touboul, a direct disciple of the Ha'ari, and another was Rabbi Asher ben Jehiel, 'The Rosh', a prominent Ashkenazi leader of 13th century Spain. However, her education was Western.

Rav Ashkenazi studied simultaneously in Yeshivah and in French secular high school in Oran, and Kabbalah in Marrakesh, Morocco. He studied philosophy and psychology in the University of Algiers, and later, when he moved to France, philosophy, ethnology and anthropology in the Sorbonne in Paris.

He was recruited to the French Foreign Legion in 1943, served in the infantry and was wounded in the Battle of Strasbourg. After the Second World War was over, he moved to Metropolitan France. There he joined the Jewish Scouts of France, where he was given the nickname 'Manitou', which in indigenous North American mythology means 'Spirit' or 'The Great Spirit'. In 1946, to the call of Robert 'Castor' Gamzon, he joined the School of Young Jewish Leadership in Orsay, near Paris (1946–1969), which aspired to establish a Jewish spiritual leadership instead of the one perished in the Holocaust. He met his wife, Mrs. Ester 'Bambi', as well as studied from his teacher and mentor in Orsay, Jacob Gordin.

After teaching for a few years, Rav Ashkenazi became principal of the Orsay school in 1951, with Prof. André Neher as president. In the following years, his involvement in the Jewish community further grew as he became president of the Jewish Students Organization (UEJF, 1950–1955), Jewish Scouts Movement (EEIF, 1955–1956), and established the Center of Academic Jewish Studies (CUEJ, 1958–1967).

As an intellectual figure Rav Ashkenazi influenced the French School of Jewish Thought (L'ecole de Pensée Juive de Paris), a spiritual and intellectual movement which developed in Orsay and later around the Annual French Jewish Intellectuals Conferences, and aimed at reviving Post-Holocaust French Jewry from its ashes. Its main goal was to understand and transmit the Jewish thought of the Torah through the use of European, universal, academic, modern thought. Its leading figures were Rav Leon Ashkenazi, Prof. Emmanuel Levinas, Prof. André Neher, Prof. Éliane Amado Levy-Valensi, writer Elie Wiesel, writer Albert Memmi and many others.

Meeting Rav Zvi Yehuda Kook and Rav Baruch Ashlag who introduced to him the thought of their prestigious fathers, Rav Kook and Rav Yehuda Ashlag, influenced Rav Ashkenazi's thought and in 1968, following the Six-Day War, he made Aliya, moved to Jerusalem and became a central figure in the Israeli-Francophone community. He established Ma'ayanot Institute for Jewish Studies and Yair Center for young Jewish leadership after the manner of Orsay. He emphasized that Am Israel's return to Zion had been prophesied by the great prophets of the Bible, that it constitutes part of the cycle of Redemption in the history of the Jewish nation, and that the ones who do not participate in this movement miss one of the most significant crossroads in the history of the Jewish people.

He contributed to the field of inter-religion discourse, traveling yearly to Cameroon, to the request of Cameroon's President Paul Biya, who was interested in being acquainted with the Bible and the history of the Jewish people. He met with the Dalai Lama, Tibet's exiled leader, and held close contacts with many Christian priests, among which was Prof. Marcel-Jacques Dubois. He received many awards, among them the Israeli Knesset Award in 1990. In 1996 he died and was eulogized by Rabbi Mordechai Eliyahu, Chief Rabbi of Israel.

Since he taught mainly in French, his thought remained concealed to non-French speakers during his lifetime. However, following the translation and publication of his lectures in Hebrew, Rav Ashkenazi's thought continues to gain new audiences to this day. His disciples and colleagues, such as Rav Shlomo Aviner, Rav Eliyahu Zini, Rav Uri Sherki, Rav Yehoshua Tzukerman, Rav Yossef Atoun, Prof. Benjamin Gross, Prof. Moshe Halamish and many more, continue to spread his teachings to Israeli audiences.

== Rav Ashkenazi's thought ==
Rav Ashkenazi's thought can be described as historical and existential query into the meaning of the identity of Israel, by extracting the existential meaning of the Biblical stories, unifying and clarifying the coherence of Jewish commentary tradition and explaining Hebrew concepts and themes through the use of universal terminology, striving to integrate two opposing worlds: traditional orthodox Jewish heritage and Modern thought and values, while remaining loyal to both. This achievement was what drew wide and diverse audiences to his lectures. Rav Ashkenazi used traditional methods of Drash to introduce new ways of understanding Judaism, while using concepts and ideas taken from Kabbalah, Midrash, Hassidut and Gemara.

Theory of Engenderment ("Torat Ha'Toladot" תורת התולדות)

Manitou's main effort was focused on understanding history, in Hebrew 'Toladot' – 'Engenderment', through the Torah, especially through the Book of Genesis, which relates the beginning of human history. The principles of this study were that the Bible is the centre and source of the faith, inspiration and power of the people of Israel, and that, since the Bible was transmitted by the Creator in a moment of historical epiphany, it constitutes the only valid overview of history and its purpose. In other words, history can be read and understood retrospectively only when reading the Torah, in the notion of the verse "This is the book of the generations of Man" (Genesis 5:1).

Indeed, the first twenty generations of humanity present Human genealogy on to Hebrew genealogy; however, each generation in its turn also symbolizes a unique human identity which has meaning and relevance to modern life. According to this view, biblical figures are the origins of nowadays identities and situations and reappear throughout history on an individual, social and national basis. The same is true when understanding the existential connections between father and son, teacher and pupil, and the conflict between rivals.

Thus, history is not simply a series of historic events, wars and cultural shifts, but of the metamorphosis and stages of the human identity. Each civilization in its turn brings into human history the drama of the progression and development of human identity, until humanity is able at last to produce a 'whole' and moral human consciousness, which is the purpose of history.

Monotheism and morals

Rav Ashkenazi claimed that only when acknowledging himself as created, can man develop a true and firm moral agenda. According to kabbalic ideas, Man was created and put into This World in order to acquire the life he had received as a gift from his Creator, achieving this by treating others with the moral dignity and ethical respect that such gift demanded. As Rav Ashkenazi applied a metahistorical and ethical terminology to Kabbalic principles, he managed all the while to connect the abstract framework of Kabbalah to the moral mundane activities of the Jewish believer. Monotheism becomes the basis for morals, and morals are a crucial element of monotheism.

From Jewish to Hebrew Identity

The theory of Engenderment ultimately focuses on Jewish identity. Manitou discusses a 'Hebrew Identity', the heritage that constituted the continuity of the Jewish identity throughout history, since Abraham the Hebrew, through Exile when it transformed into a diasporic, religion-focused Jewish identity which constituted the consciousness of the Jewish people for two thousand years, and until once again it transformed into a national, Israeli identity. Upon Kibbutz Galuyot – the return and gathering of the exiled communities in Israel, the Jewish people has the opportunity to bring together the different 'ways of life', or the diverse identities it gathered during its Exile among the nations, and begin World Peace within itself.

== Publications ==
Hebrew

- Sod Ha-Ivri (The Secret of the Hebrew Identity). Part I, Part II. ed. Gabrielle Ben Shmuel, Israel Pivko. Chava Bet El, 2005, 2009
- Misped Lamashiach?! (A Eulogy For the Messiah?!). ed. Israel Pivko, Itai Ashkenazi & Elyakim Simsovic, Chava Bet-El, 2006
- Sod Leshon Hakodesh (The Secret of the Holy Tongue). ed. Shlomo Ben-Naim & Israel Pivko, Chava Bet-El, 2007
- Sod Midrash Ha'Toladot (Midrash of the Engenderments). ed. Haim Rotenberg, Chava Beit El, 2009
- Midrash B'sod Ha'hafachim (Midrash in the Secret of Opposites) ed. Itay Ashkenazi, Yediot Achronot & Bet Morasha Press, 2009
- ''''"Israel m'eayn ule'an" (Israel from where to where) ed. Chay Shaqday, Elyakim Simsovic, Mendelbaum private publ., 2013'''''

French

- La parole et l'écrit, ed. Marcel Goldman. Part 1: Penser la tradition juive aujourd'hui, ISBN 2-226-10844-0. Part 2: Penser la vie juive aujourd'hui, ISBN 2-226-15433-7. Édition Albin Michel, 1999.
- Ki Mitsion, Part 1 - Notes sur la Paracha; Part 2 – Moadim. Jerusalem, Foundation Manitou, 1997.
- Koginsky, Michel. Un Hébreu d'origine juive. Hommage au rav Yéhouda Léon Ashkenazi – Manitou. (A Hebrew Man of Jewish Origins, Rav Leon Ashkenazi's Biography). Éditions Ormaya, 1998
