= Cabinet of Israel =

Governing authority of Israel

Government of Israel
- ממשלת ישראל • مجلس وزراء إسرائيل
- Central government
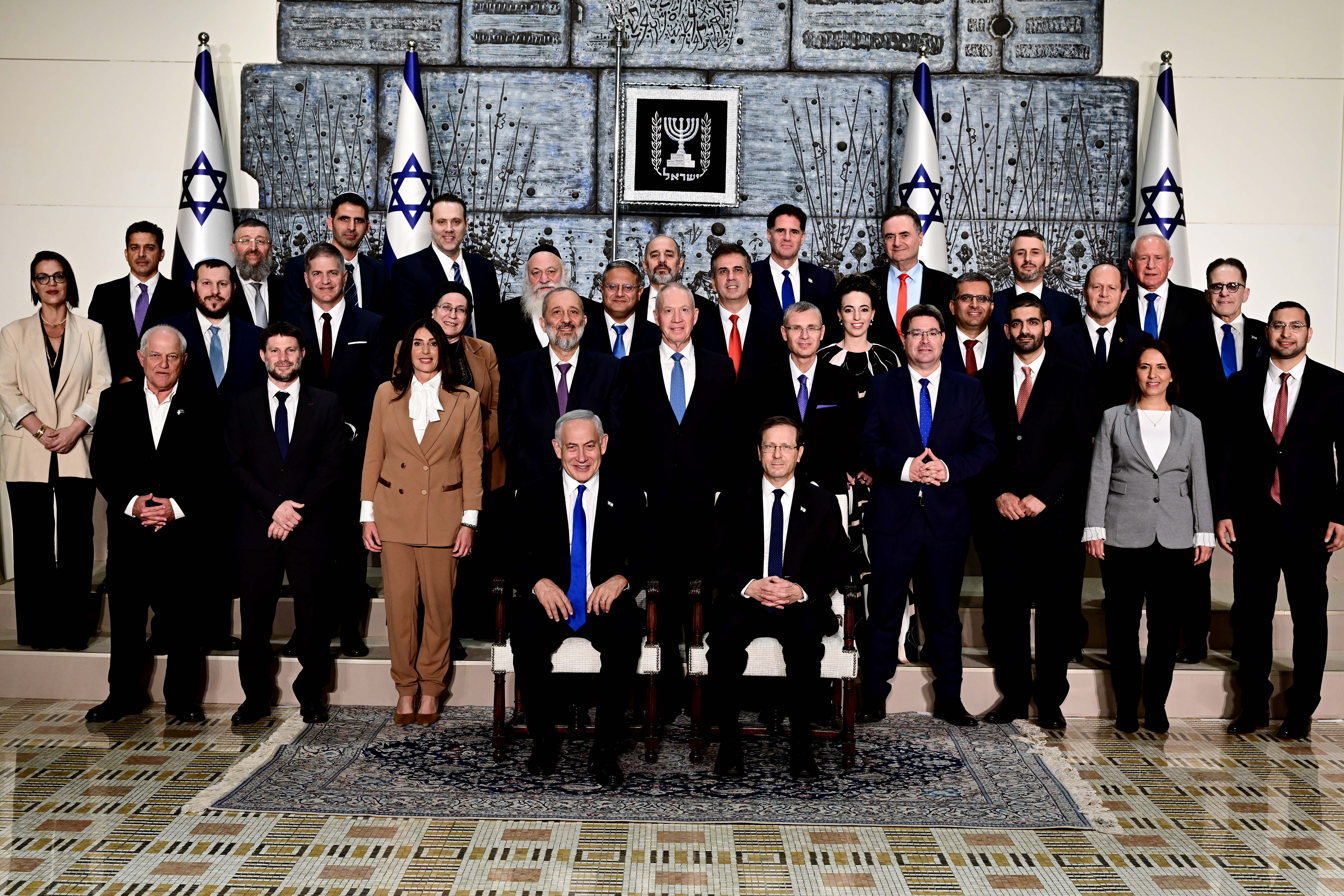
- 37th Government of Israel, in Beit HaNassi

Overview
- Established: 1949
- State: State of Israel
- Leader: Prime Minister
- Appointed by: The Prime Minister is formally appointed by the President of the State after consultation with parties in the Knesset. Other ministers are directly appointed by the Prime Minister.
- Ministries: 28
- Responsible to: Knesset
- Headquarters: Jerusalem
- Website: www.gov.il

The Cabinet of Israel (Hebrew: ממשלת ישראל, romanized: Memshelet Yisra'el; Arabic: مجلس وزراء إسرائيل, romanized: Majlis Wuzaraʾ Israʾil) is the cabinet which exercises executive authority in the State of Israel. It consists of ministers who are chosen and led by the prime minister. The composition of the government must be approved by a vote of confidence in the Knesset (the Israeli parliament). Under Israeli law, the prime minister may dismiss members of the government but must do so in writing, and new appointees must be approved by the Knesset. Most ministers lead ministries, though some are ministers without portfolio. Most ministers are members of the Knesset, though only the Prime Minister and the "designated acting prime minister" are required to be Knesset members. Some ministers are also called deputy and vice-prime ministers. Unlike the designated acting prime minister, these roles have no statutory meanings. The government operates in accordance with the Basic Law. It meets on Sundays weekly in Jerusalem. There may be additional meetings if circumstances require it. The current head of government, the prime minister, is Benjamin Netanyahu.

The Israeli cabinet–officially described in the Basic Laws as the "Government"–is both the de jure and de facto executive authority in Israel. The Basic Laws explicitly vest executive power in the cabinet/Government, not the President.

== Use of terms ==
The body discussed in this article is referred to in Israeli official documents as the Government of Israel. This is in accordance with the normal translation of its Hebrew name, (Hebrew: ממשלה, Memshala). In Israel, the term cabinet (Hebrew: קבינט) is generally used for the State-Security Cabinet (Hebrew: הקבינט המדיני-ביטחוני HaKabinet haMedini-Bitachoni), a smaller forum of cabinet members that decides on defense and foreign policy issues and may consist of up to half of the (full) cabinet members. Another term in use is the Kitchen Cabinet (Hebrew: המטבחון, HaMitbahon, lit. "The kitchenette"), a collection of senior officials, or unofficial advisers to the Security Cabinet of Israel.

== Provisional and first governments of Israel ==
The first government was the provisional government of Israel (HaMemshala HaZmanit) which governed from shortly before independence until the formation of the first formal government in March 1949 following the first Knesset elections in January that year. It was formed as the People's Administration (Minhelet HaAm) on 12 April 1948, in preparation for independence just over a month later. All its thirteen members were taken from Moetzet HaAm, the temporary legislative body set up at the same time.

== Current government ==
The thirty-seventh government of Israel (Hebrew: ממשלת ישראל השלושים ושבע) is the current government of Israel, which was sworn in on 29 December 2022.

== List of cabinets ==
Government	Dates in office	Prime Minister	Duration
Provisional	14 May 1948 – 10 March 1949	David Ben-Gurion	300 days
1st	10 March 1949 – 30 October 1950	David Ben-Gurion	1 year, 234 days
2nd	1 November 1950 – 8 October 1951	David Ben-Gurion	341 days
3rd	8 October 1951 – 24 December 1952	David Ben-Gurion	1 year, 77 days
4th	24 December 1952 – 26 January 1954	David Ben-Gurion, Moshe Sharett	1 year, 33 days
5th	26 January 1954 – 29 June 1955	Moshe Sharett	1 year, 154 days
6th	29 June 1955 – 3 November 1955	Moshe Sharett	127 days
7th	3 November 1955 – 7 January 1958	David Ben-Gurion	2 years, 65 days
8th	7 January 1958 – 17 December 1959	David Ben-Gurion	1 year, 344 days
9th	17 December 1959 – 2 November 1961	David Ben-Gurion	1 year, 320 days
10th	2 November 1961 – 26 June 1963	David Ben-Gurion	1 year, 236 days
11th	26 June 1963 – 22 December 1964	Levi Eshkol	1 year, 179 days
12th	22 December 1964 – 12 January 1966	Levi Eshkol	1 year, 21 days
13th	12 January 1966 – 17 March 1969	Levi Eshkol, Yigal Allon	3 years, 64 days
14th	17 March 1969 – 15 December 1969	Golda Meir	273 days
15th	15 December 1969 – 10 March 1974	Golda Meir	4 years, 85 days
16th	10 March 1974 – 3 June 1974	Golda Meir	85 days
17th	3 June 1974 – 20 June 1977	Yitzhak Rabin	3 years, 17 days
18th	20 June 1977 – 5 August 1981	Menachem Begin	4 years, 46 days
19th	5 August 1981 – 28 August 1983	Menachem Begin	2 years, 23 days
20th	10 October 1983 – 13 September 1984	Yitzhak Shamir	339 days
21st	13 September 1984 – 20 October 1986	Shimon Peres	2 years, 37 days
22nd	20 October 1986 – 22 December 1988	Yitzhak Shamir	2 years, 63 days
23rd	22 December 1988 – 11 June 1990	Yitzhak Shamir	1 year, 171 days
24th	11 June 1990 – 13 July 1992	Yitzhak Shamir	2 years, 32 days
25th	13 July 1992 – 22 November 1995	Yitzhak Rabin, Shimon Peres	3 years, 132 days
26th	22 November 1995 – 18 June 1996	Shimon Peres	209 days
27th	18 June 1996 – 6 July 1999	Benjamin Netanyahu	3 years, 18 days
28th	6 July 1999 – 7 March 2001	Ehud Barak	1 year, 244 days
29th	7 March 2001 – 28 February 2003	Ariel Sharon	1 year, 358 days
30th	28 February 2003 – 4 May 2006	Ariel Sharon, Ehud Olmert	3 years, 65 days
31st	4 May 2006 – 31 March 2009	Ehud Olmert	2 years, 331 days
32nd	31 March 2009 – 18 March 2013	Benjamin Netanyahu	3 years, 352 days
33rd	18 March 2013 – 14 May 2015	Benjamin Netanyahu	2 years, 57 days
34th	14 May 2015 – 17 May 2020	Benjamin Netanyahu	5 years, 3 days
35th	17 May 2020 – 13 June 2021	Benjamin Netanyahu	1 year, 27 days
36th	13 June 2021 – 29 December 2022	Naftali Bennett, Yair Lapid	1 year, 199 days
37th	29 December 2022 –	Benjamin Netanyahu	3 years, 318 days

== See also ==
- Basic Law: The Government
- Israeli system of government
