= Undercover Boss Israel =

- בוס בהסוואה
- Genre: Reality television
- Directed by: Ohad Gal-Oz
- Country of origin: Israel
- Original language: Hebrew
- No. of series: 2
- No. of episodes: 15

Production
- Executive producers: Omer Lakner; Assaf Gil
- Producer: Eyal Siman Tov
- Running time: 60 minutes
- Production company: Gil Productions

Original release
- Release: 2013

Related
- Undercover Boss (franchise)

Undercover Boss (Hebrew: בוס בהסוואה, Bos Be'hasva'a is a 2013 Israeli reality television series based on the British series of the same name. Each episode depicts a person who has a high management position at a major business, deciding to become undercover as an entry-level employee to discover the faults in the company.

== Format ==
Each episode features a high-ranking executive or the owner of a corporation going undercover as an entry-level employee in their own company. The executives alter their appearance and assume an alias and fictional back-story. The fictitious explanation given for the accompanying camera crew is that the executives are being filmed as part of a documentary about entry-level workers in a particular industry. They spend approximately one week undercover, working in various areas of their company operations, with a different job and in most cases a different location each day. They are exposed to a series of predicaments with amusing results, and invariably spend time getting to know the people who work in the company, learning about their professional and personal challenges.

At the end of their week undercover, the executives return to their true identity and request the employees they worked with individually to corporate headquarters. The bosses reveal their identity, and reward hard-working employees through campaign, promotion, or financial rewards, while other employees are given training or better working conditions.

== Episodes ==
Series	Episodes	Originally aired	
Series	Episodes	Series premiere	Series finale
1	6	January 2013	March 2013
2	9	April 2015	June 2015

=== Series 1: 2013 ===
No.	Title	Boss	Original release date
1	"Isrotel"	V.P. Operations Shlomi Tachan	TBA
2	"Albar"	CEO Yinon Amit	TBA
3	"Pizza Hut"	Owner & CEO Udi Shamai	TBA
4	"Café Café"	Owner Mickey Til	TBA
5	"Team 3"	Owner & CEO Nir Gilboa	TBA
6	"The Excellent Employee"	N/A	TBA

Note: Episode 6 did not focus on a new company, it was filmed 6 months after the original ones, as a follow-up.

=== Series 2: 2015 ===
A second season was picked up, which aired in 2015 and contained 9 additional episodes.

No.	Title	Boss	Original release date
1	"Burgus Burger Bar"	Owner Yaron Israel	TBA
2	"Na'amat"	Chairman Galya Wolach	TBA
3	"Holmes Place"	Owner & ECO Jonathan Fisher	TBA
4	"Israel Electric Corporation"	ECO Iftach Ron Tal	TBA
5	"Yenot Bitan"	Deputy CEO Yossi Bitan	TBA
6	"Fattal"	Director General Reuben Elkes	TBA
7	"Mey Eden"	V.P. Marketing Michael Rabinovich	TBA
8	"Golf & Co"	TBA	TBA
9	"El Al"	V.P. Computing Ofer Tzabari	TBA

== Criticism ==
Many criticized the show for focusing too much on the company. By focusing on the company rather than the interaction, critics said the show became just one big advertisement for the companies.

== See also ==
- Television in Israel
