= Killing of Yoel Lhanghal =

2022 killing in Kiryat Shmona, Israel

- photo of victim
- Location: 33°12′19″N 35°34′06″E; Histadrut Square, Kiryat Shmona, Israel
- Date: 7 October 2022
- Weapon: knife
- Victim: 1
- Assailant: ~14
- Convictions: Aggravated assault, aiding and abetting assault
- Convicted: 2

On 7 October 2022, 18 year old Yoel Lhanghal (Hebrew: יואל להנגהל) was beaten and stabbed to death by a group of about 14 young people in Kiryat Shmona, Israel. Although the police had arrived in the middle of the incident, they left without resolving the issue. Local resident Liad Edri was charged with murder; he received a plea deal and was ultimately sentenced to 5.5 years in prison for aggravated assault. A minor was sentenced to community service for aiding and abetting the assault. A police officer involved in the investigation was accused of obstructing justice and later convicted of fraud and breach of trust. A member of the Bnei Menashe community, Lhanghal had recently immigrated to Israel from India.

== Background ==
Yoel Lhanghal was an 18 year old member of the Bnei Menashe community. The Bnei Menashe believe they are part of the tribe of Manassah, and their Jewish lineage was recognized by Rabbi Shlomo Amar in 2005. Most members of the community reside in India, but several thousand have immigrated to Israel. At the time of his killing, Lhanghal and his family had recently immigrated to Israel with his family. He lived in Nof Hagalil and did not speak Hebrew. A yeshiva student, he was about to begin his service in the Israeli military.

== Incident ==
On 7 October 2022, Lhanghal visited his girlfriend in Kiryat Shmona. In the evening, they were sitting near Histadrut Square when they were harassed by a group of teenagers. According to the police, the teens accused Lhanghal of abusing his girlfriend, and a fight ensued. When the police arrived, they saw that Lhangal was injured. After telling everyone to go home, the police departed, and the incident resumed. Several people arrived armed with weapons including stones, sticks, and chains. According to prosecutors, 21-year-old Liad Edri had heard that “Thai people were beating up children.” Edri stabbed Lhanghal. When Lhanghal tried to escape, the group of about 14 assailants beat Lhanghal. In CCTV footage, Lhanghal is repeatedly attacked and falls to the ground. Lhanghal died at Ziv Medical Center in Safed.

== Investigation ==
The next day, the police detained 11 suspects, including 9 teens and a soldier. After 2 days, the minors were given 5 days of house arrest. The police questioned more than 100 people, the majority of whom were teens who had attended a nearby birthday party. According to journalist Daniel Amram, he aided the investigation by confronting the perpetrators and submitting video of the confrontation to the police.

=== Charges against assailants ===
On 21 November 2022, Liad Edri, was charged with the murder of Lhanghal. He was the only person charged. The indictment did not identify a racist motivation for the crime. In May 2023, the court decided Edri could be released to house arrest after paying NIS 150,000 bail. Edri pled guilty in exchange for his charges being reduced to aggravated assault with intent to cause harm and obstruction of justice. In September 2024, the court ruled that it was unclear who had killed Lhanghal. Edri was sentenced to 5.5 years in prison and fined NIS 50,000. The attorney for the Lhanghal family condemned the verdict as too lenient. In October 2024, the State Attorney's Office appealed the sentence, arguing that the maximum sentence for Edri's charges is 20 years imprisonment and his actions caused Lhanghal's death. According to the State Attorney's Office, Edri had instigated several teens to attack Lhanghal, stabbed Lhanghal, hidden evidence, and told another assailant to lie to police.

In September 2024, 10 people, mostly teens, were indicted for "causing injury under aggravated circumstances". Ultimately, most were not convicted of any crime. In January 2026, the court announced that a minor had been charged with aiding and abetting the assault on Lhanghal and had been sentenced with 250 hours of community service and a NIS 5,000 fine.

=== Legal action against the police ===
One of the officers who responded to the scene, Haim Gabai, was acquainted with Edri. According to KAN, Gabai's daughter had dated Edri. Before the police knew about Edri's role in Lhanghal's death, Gabai advised Edri's mom to hire a lawyer. Additionally, Gabai did not tell investigators that he knew Edri or that he suspected Edri may have been involved in the murder. During the investigation, Gabai attempted to remove a bloodied piece of evidence from the crime scene. Two of his colleagues moved the evidence to a different location in the crime scene. The three officers did not inform the forensics team.

The Kiryat Shmona chief of police lost his position due to the police's mishandling of the investigation. Gabai was fired and the other two officers received official reprimands. In January 2023, Gabai and the other two police officers were indicted for providing confidential information about the murder investigation to Edri. They were charged with obstruction of justice, fraud, and breach of trust. According to the indictment, Gabai had seen his daughter at the scene of the fight and did not report the fight or Lhangal's injuries to his supervisors. In February 2024, Gabai pled guilty to fraud and breach of trust in exchange for the obstruction of justice charge being dropped. His potential sentence was community service. The attorney for the Lhanghal family condemned the verdict as too lenient and said that Gabai's actions had undermined the case against Edri.

In September 2026, the Lhanghal family filed a 6.6 million shekel lawsuit against the police. The lawsuit argues that the police did not adequately address the attack on Lhanghal when they first arrived at the scene and he was still alive. The lawsuit further argues that the police mishandled the investigation of his killing which prevented a murder conviction.

== Reactions ==
Michael Freund wrote a column calling for Israeli children to be taught to "value each of its multi-varied components, be they Bnei Menashe, Russian, Ethiopian or American". According to Freund, Lhanghal's family suspected that racism was a motivation for the murder. According to Haaretz, the killing was "racially motivated".

In 2023, a park was dedicated in Nof Hagalil in memory of Lhanghal.

Lhangal's killing has been referenced in discussions about youth crime in Israel and the 2026 killing of Yemanu Binyamin Zelka. The discussions blame issues with the police investigation for the lack of convictions in the case.
