= Machon Meir =

Jewish educational organization

- מכון מאיר
- Machon Meir building in Jerusalem (2025)
- Named after: Eliezer Meir Lifshitz
- Formation: 1974; 52 years ago
- Founder: Dov Bigon
- Type: Religious Zionist educational center
- Legal status: Registered nonprofit association
- Location: Sderot HaMeiri 2, Jerusalem, Israel
- Services: Yeshiva studies; women's seminary; Hebrew ulpan; conversion courses; online Torah media
- Fields: Jewish studies; Religious Zionism; Kiruv
- Official language: Hebrew; English; French; Spanish; Russian
- Awards: Agrest Prize for Jewish Culture, awarded to Arutz Meir (2010)
- Website: meirtv.com machonmeir.net

Machon Meir (Hebrew: מכון מאיר, meaning "Meir Institute") is a Religious Zionist educational center located in the Kiryat Moshe neighborhood of Jerusalem.

Founded in 1974 following the Yom Kippur War by Rabbi Dov Bigon, a student of Rabbi Zvi Yehuda Kook, the institute was initially oriented toward baalei teshuva and developed in accordance with the teachings of Rabbi Abraham Isaac Kook. Machon Meir's educational approach emphasizes the gradual adoption of a religious way of life within the framework of Religious Zionism. Torah study is combined with Hebrew-language instruction and an introduction to Israel's history and culture.

In addition to its men's yeshiva, Machon Meir includes the women's midrasha Machon Ora. It also has departments for English-, French-, Russian-, and Spanish-speaking students, a Hebrew ulpan, and a conversion preparation program. Its curriculum includes Jewish thought, the Gemara, the Tanakh, and halakha. The institute is headed by its founder, Rabbi Dov Bigon. Machon Meir operates through a nonprofit association whose main sources of income are donations, paid online subscriptions, tuition fees, and government support. Since the 1990s, the institute has developed its own religious educational media. It published a multilingual weekly newsletter, launched the Arutz Meir online channel in 2004, and introduced the children's channel Arutz Meir Kids in 2006. The institute's alumni include prominent military, religious, and public figures.

== History ==
Machon Meir was founded in Jerusalem in 1974, following the Yom Kippur War (1973), by Rabbi Dov Bigon. Following the war, he helped soldiers and students who came to Mercaz HaRav seeking religious guidance.

At first, Rabbi Bigon welcomed soldiers and students into his home; as the group grew, these gatherings led to the establishment of Machon Meir. Before founding the institute, Bigon consulted with Rabbis Zvi Yehuda Kook and Haim Druckman. The institute was named in memory of Eliezer Meir Lifshitz, a paratrooper reservist killed during the war. Machon Meir's Torah study program is based on the teachings of Rabbi Abraham Isaac Kook and is largely oriented toward baalei teshuva (Note: The Israeli teshuva movement emerged in the late 1960s and early 1970s and was influenced by the Six-Day War (1967) and the Yom Kippur War (1973). The experience of these wars prompted some Israelis to reflect on their identity and the meaning of their personal and national lives, leading them to turn to Jewish tradition in search of answers. During the 1970s, the movement began to take institutional forms, including yeshiva studies, seminars, and other forms of religious education and outreach.).

During the 1980s and 1990s, Machon Meir grew from a relatively small institution into a major center for religious education, enrolling hundreds of students from around the world each year. By 2004, thousands of students had studied at Machon Meir.

== Educational approach ==
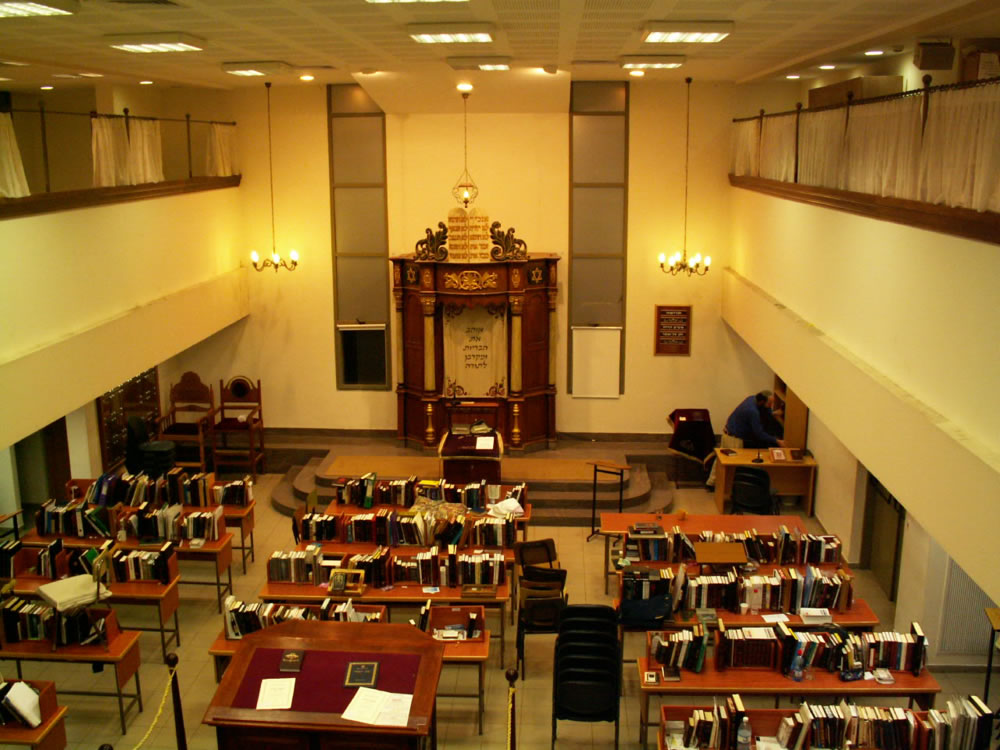
The beit midrash of Machon Meir

Machon Meir primarily serves students who have not previously received systematic Jewish education. It was among the first institutions of the Religious Zionist branch of the teshuva movement, which sought to introduce students gradually to a religious way of life.

The Machon Meir yeshiva encourages service in the Israel Defense Forces. Those attending classes are not required to fully adopt Orthodox beliefs and practices, but full-time students must observe Shabbat, the laws of kashrut, and standards of tzniut (modesty) in dress. Living in Israel and Jewish settlement throughout Eretz Yisrael are integral elements of the religious worldview espoused at Machon Meir.

The institute's educational programs combine Torah study with learning about Israel and its history. Activities include excursions into nature and visits to historical and religious sites. Hebrew-language instruction and interaction with native-born Israeli students are intended to help immigrant students integrate into Israeli society.

== Structure and programs ==
=== Machon Meir yeshiva ===
The yeshiva enrolls men with varying levels of religious education. Alongside students from religious Jewish backgrounds, a substantial proportion are baalei teshuva and prospective converts. Instruction is adapted to their different levels of preparation. Students come from Israel and abroad and attend the yeshiva either before or after military service. Both full-time and part-time study programs are available, allowing students to combine their studies with employment or academic education.

The main areas of study of the yeshiva are Jewish thought and faith (emunah) and the Gemara. The former places considerable emphasis on the writings of Rabbis Abraham Isaac Kook and Zvi Yehuda Kook. Gemara is studied at various levels, using both bekiut (sequential study of the text) and iyun (in-depth analysis). The curriculum also includes the Tanakh, halakha, and the weekly Torah portion. Separate Gemara study groups are available for beginners, advanced students, and those pursuing in-depth study. Much of the afternoon is devoted to chavruta study and regular study groups.

=== Machon Ora women's seminary ===
The midrasha Machon Ora, the women's division of Machon Meir, was founded around 1976 and is also located in Jerusalem. Its educational approach is based in part on the teachings of Rabbi Abraham Isaac Kook. The seminary accepts women with varying levels of religious education. Its curriculum includes Jewish thought, halakha, the Tanakh, Jewish ethics, and preparation for family life in accordance with Jewish tradition. The main program runs five days a week and combines teacher-led classes with independent chavruta study. External and other part-time programs are also available.

=== Foreign-language departments ===
Initially, classes at Machon Meir were conducted exclusively in Hebrew.

In August 1979, Rabbi Natan Ophir (Offenbacher) established a department for English-speaking students at Machon Meir. Rabbi Menachem Listman, who joined Machon Meir in 1981–1982, later became head of the department.

The French-speaking department was established in 1983 by Rabbi Yosef Attoun, who headed it until 2007. Rabbi David Partouche later became head of the department.

In 1990, Rabbis Avraham Adler and Yosef Mendelevitch established the Russian-speaking department, where thousands of immigrants from the Post-Soviet states have studied.

By 2005, a Spanish-speaking department had also been established under the direction of Rabbi Rafael Spangenthal, serving students from Ibero-America.

=== Hebrew-language instruction ===
The Machon Meir yeshiva operates a Hebrew ulpan (language school). New students are assessed and placed in its classes according to their Hebrew proficiency. Instruction covers speaking, writing, listening, and reading. The program is designed to facilitate integration into Israeli society and eventually prepare students for classes taught in Hebrew. Upon completing the course, students may take a Hebrew examination administered by the Israeli Ministry of Education. Hebrew-language instruction is also offered at Machon Ora.

=== Conversion program ===
Machon Meir has operated a conversion preparation program since the late 1980s. A 2018 report on the conversion system in Israel classified Machon Meir as a private conversion-preparation institute. At the time, the program operated primarily in Jerusalem under the direction of Rabbi Yossi Dinkevich and provided guidance to approximately 100 students annually who subsequently appeared before conversion courts. The program received government funding for preparing conversion candidates. In its 2023 report, the Prime Minister's Office listed Machon Meir among the organizations approved to receive support for this activity.

The theoretical component of the conversion preparation program typically lasts about nine months. Separate programs are offered for men and women, with classes conducted in Hebrew, English, Russian, and Spanish. For men, both an evening program and a full-time daytime program with accommodation at Machon Meir are available. The timing of a student's appearance before a conversion court depends on their individual level of preparation. The program also includes an opportunity to experience religious Jewish life with a host family.

== Leadership and faculty ==
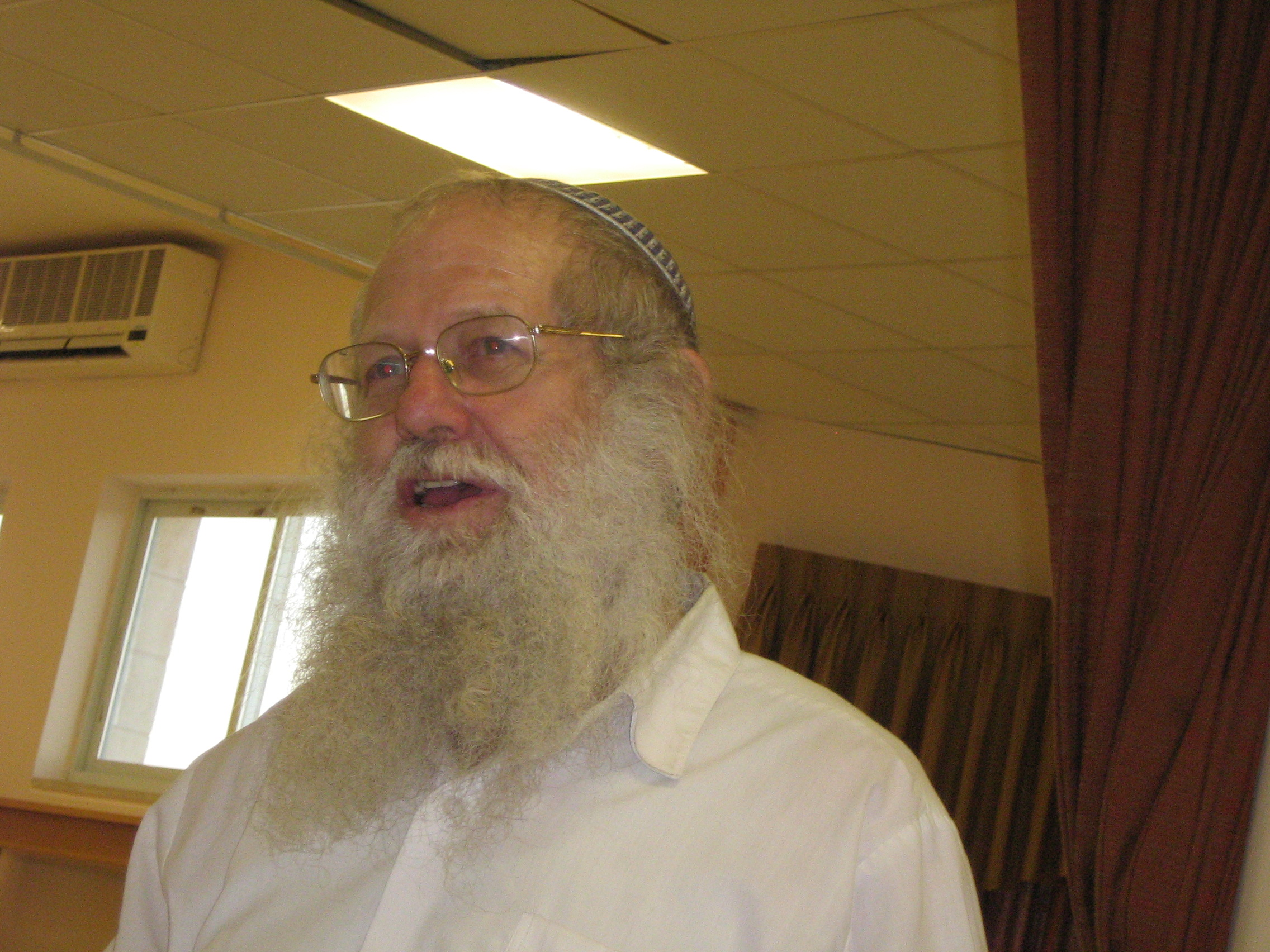
Founder and head of Machon Meir, Rabbi Dov Bigon (2006)

Machon Meir is headed by its founder, Rabbi Dov Bigon, a baal teshuva (a formerly secular Jew who became religiously observant). He studied for over a decade at the Mercaz HaRav yeshiva under Rabbi Zvi Yehuda Kook. During the Six-Day War (1967), he served as a deputy company commander and participated in the battles for Jerusalem.

In 2024, Rabbi Ran Ben Moshe joined Machon Meir. He had previously headed the Beit Rimon pre-military preparatory academy and taught at a hesder yeshiva in Safed. Dov Bigon appointed him head of the yeshiva's beit midrash. Rabbi Ben Moshe currently coordinates Machon Meir's Israeli program.

Machon Meir's foreign-language departments are headed by Rabbi Menachem Listman (English), Rabbi David Partouche (French), Rabbi Rafael Spangenthal (Spanish), and Rabbi Avraham Adler (Russian). Rabbi Eliyahu Berezhinsky serves as deputy head of the Russian-speaking department.

Longtime faculty members include Rabbi Oury Amos Cherki and Rabbi Yosef Mendelevitch, a former Soviet refusenik and Prisoner of Zion.

The Machon Ora midrasha is headed by Rabbanit Geula Nissim. She previously taught for many years in programs combining Torah study with academic education, including at Ariel University.

== Funding ==
The nonprofit association "Machon Meir – Center for Jewish Studies in Israel" (Hebrew: מכון מאיר המרכז ללימודי היהדות בישראל), through which the institute operates, was registered on 26 October 1983. According to its financial statements, the association's annual revenue ranged from 22 to 28 million shekels between 2020 and 2024.

Donations are Machon Meir's largest source of revenue. In 2018, the institute conducted a fundraising campaign to finance the construction of two additional floors at its Jerusalem complex, raising approximately 16.4 million shekels and exceeding its initial target of 15 million. Between 2020 and 2024, the amount received in donations remained relatively stable, but their share of the institute's total revenue declined from 52.5% to 43.9%, with donations totaling 12.28 million shekels in 2024.

The second-largest source of income is paid online subscriptions, particularly to the Arutz Meir Kids video channel. In 2024, subscription revenue amounted to approximately 7.97 million shekels, accounting for 28.5% of Machon Meir's total revenue. Between 2020 and 2024, subscription revenue increased by approximately 50%, while its share of total revenue rose from 24% to 28.5%.

Tuition fees are another significant source of revenue for Machon Meir. Between 2020 and 2024, tuition revenue nearly doubled, rising from 1.86 million to 3.49 million shekels, while its share of the institute's total revenue increased from 8.4% to 12.5%.

Government funding also plays a significant role, including support for Torah study institutions from the Israeli Ministry of Education, funding for conversion preparation programs through the Prime Minister's Office, and financial support from the Jerusalem Municipality. Between 2020 and 2024, combined revenue from government and municipal bodies ranged from 2.03 million to 3.24 million shekels, while its share of the institute's total revenue declined from 12.2% to 11.6%.

== Publications and media ==
Before launching his own weekly publication, Rabbi Dov Bigon hosted a segment on Arutz Sheva radio. He later recalled that, after receiving feedback from a female listener, he wrote an article about the weekly Torah portion and left it at the synagogue she attended. This marked the first step toward establishing his own periodical. In 1994–1995, Israel Goldberg, then a student at Machon Meir, proposed publishing a weekly newsletter. The publication was named Be'ahava Uve'emuna ("With Love and Faith"), and Goldberg organized its production and distribution to synagogues. The newsletter was distributed in six languages: Hebrew, English, Russian, French, German, and Spanish.

Machon Meir also disseminated Torah teachings through audio cassettes and video cassettes, alongside its conferences and weekly newsletter, before internet broadcasting became widespread. The collections of the National Library of Israel include a four-cassette set of Rabbi Bigon's lectures published by the institute in Jerusalem in 2002–2003. The recordings cover returning to Jewish religious observance, the Days of Awe, and Passover.

=== Arutz Meir ===
In December 2004, Machon Meir launched the online channel Arutz Meir (Hebrew: ערוץ מאיר, "Meir Channel"), primarily to disseminate Torah lessons. Classes were streamed live or made available as recordings, and viewers could submit questions online for rabbis to answer during broadcasts.

By early 2010, Arutz Meir had begun producing original programs for adult audiences, including interviews, alongside its broadcasts of Torah classes. That same year, the channel received the annual Agrest Prize for Jewish Culture, awarded by the Israeli Ministry of Education and named after Yaakov Agrest. The award committee recognized the channel for producing programs on various aspects of Judaism and promoting Jewish religious and cultural heritage.

In 2013, Arutz Meir expanded beyond internet broadcasting and began operating as an independent television channel on the HOT network, broadcasting 24 hours a day, six days a week. In February 2014, the channel launched a new website offering content in HD and also began broadcasting via the yes satellite platform. Broadcasting on HOT and yes continued for several years.

Arutz Meir later shifted its focus to internet broadcasting. It now serves as Machon Meir's online platform, offering live broadcasts and an archive of Torah classes. By 2022, its online archive contained thousands of video and audio recordings of lessons. Arutz Meir's content is also distributed through dedicated websites and online channels in Hebrew, English, French, Spanish, and Russian.

=== Arutz Meir Kids ===
The separate online channel Arutz Meir Kids (Hebrew: ערוץ מאיר לילדים) was launched in December 2006, initially as children's programming on the Arutz Meir website. Its programs focused on Jewish history and traditions, as well as raising children in accordance with religious values. One of the channel's most popular programs was Assi and Tuvia. Around 2010, the channel introduced paid subscriptions while keeping some programs freely accessible. By February 2012, it had several thousand paying subscribers, approximately 60,000 unique visitors, and 2.5–3 million page views per month.

In April 2011, the channel released a special English-language series for Passover. Its programs were also distributed on DVD. In 2012, for example, Machon Meir released a six-disc collection of Assi, Tuvia and Polke programs. In 2012, the channel began publishing a weekly online children's magazine, Meiriton (Hebrew: מאירתון), whose name combines Meir with iton, the Hebrew word for "newspaper" (Hebrew: עיתון). The magazine was distributed free of charge by email, and most of its content was written by children themselves. The digital collection of the National Library of Israel contains 78 issues of the magazine published between 2012 and 2014. By 2022, Machon Meir had a dedicated studio for children's programming in its Jerusalem building.

According to a 2025 document from the Ministry of Settlement and National Missions, over approximately 18 years of operation, the channel produced around 60 original series comprising a total of approximately 4,000 episodes and videos. At the time, the website had more than 15,000 subscribers, while freely available videos attracted hundreds of thousands of additional views.

== Notable alumni ==
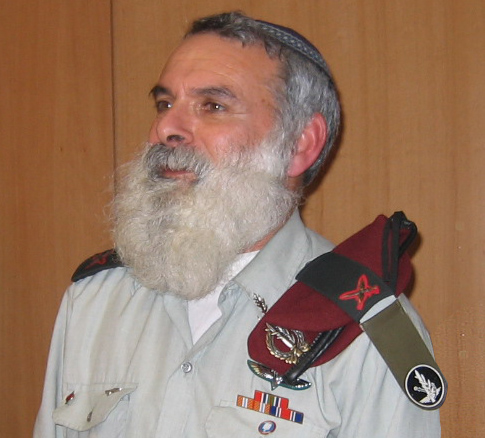
Machon Meir alumnus Avichai Rontzki, chief military rabbi of the Israel Defense Forces (2007)

Machon Meir alumni include Israel Defense Forces brigade commanders and heads of yeshivot, as well as prominent public figures.

Among the institute's earliest students was Effi Eitam, who later became an Israel Defense Forces brigadier general, a member of the Knesset, and a government minister. According to Eitam, Machon Meir laid the foundation for his Torah studies and played a major role in shaping the subsequent course of his life.

Rabbi Avichai Rontzki, who later became Chief Rabbi of the Israel Defense Forces, studied at Machon Meir during his return to religious observance. In 1984, Rontzki was among the founders of the Itamar settlement, established by several families who had studied at Machon Meir.

Machon Meir alumni include Orit Strook, who began studying at the institute in the 11th grade during her return to religious observance. She later became a member of the Knesset and a government minister. Rabbi Yigal Levinstein, who later co-founded the Bnei David pre-military academy, also studied at the institute.

== Bibliography ==
- Goldberg, Hillel (1980), "Review of Israeli Intellectual Life: Bridging the Gap", Tradition, 18 (2): 212–223
- Leon, Nissim (2015), "The Significance of the Yom Kippur War as a Turning Point in the Religious-Zionist Society", in Lebel, Udi; Lewin, Eyal (eds.), The 1973 Yom Kippur War and the Reshaping of Israeli Civil–Military Relations, Lanham, Maryland: Lexington Books, pp. 37–54, ISBN 978-1-4985-1371-5
- Sharabi, Asaf (2013), ""Boundary work" in a religious revival movement: The case of the "teshuvah movement" in Israel", Ethnography, 14 (2): 233–254, doi:10.1177/1466138112448005
