= Orit Strook =

Israeli politician

- אורית סטרוק
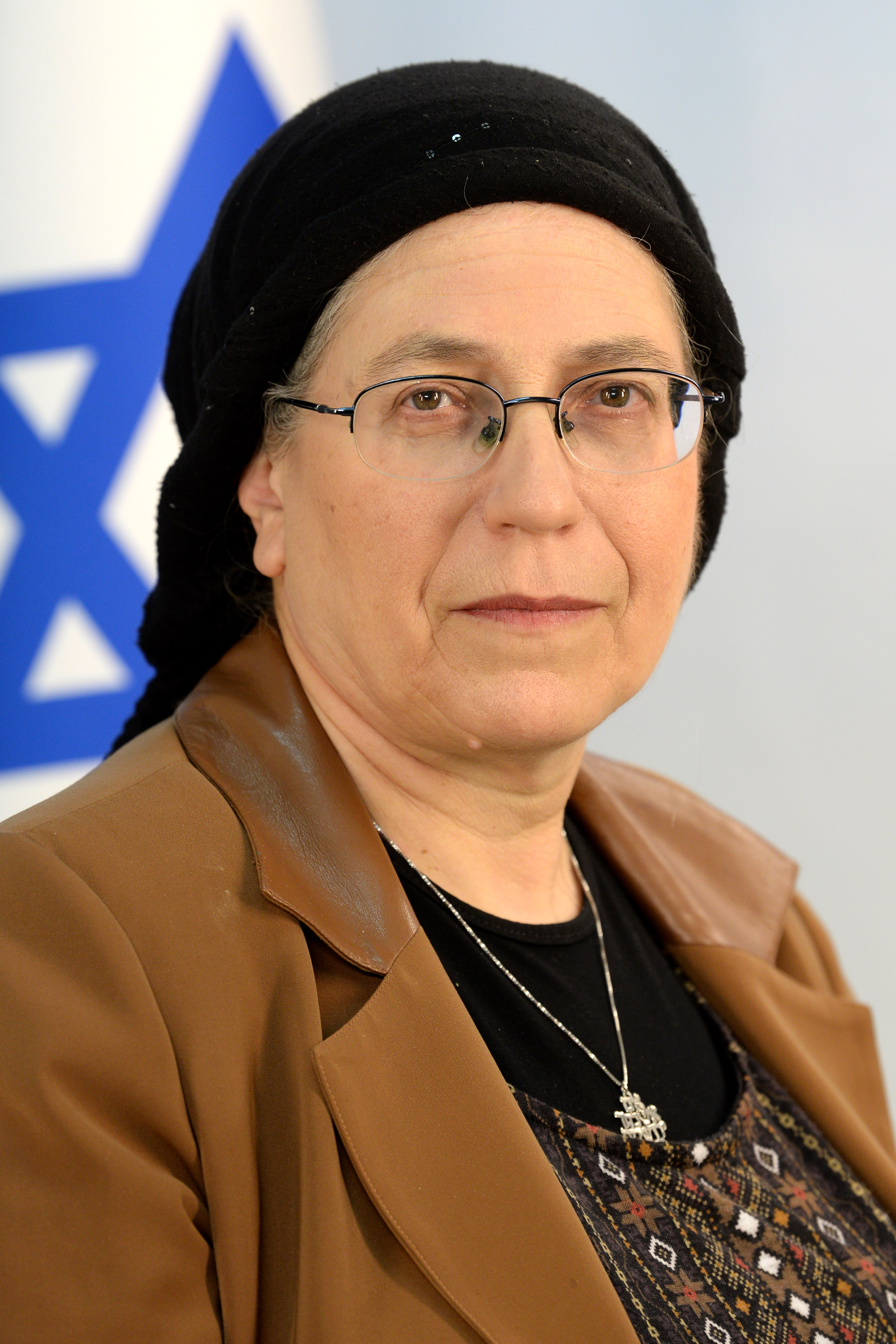
- Official portrait, 2023

Ministerial roles
- 2022–: Minister of Settlements and National Missions

Faction represented in the Knesset
- 2013–2015: Jewish Home
- 2021–: Religious Zionist Party

Personal details
- Born: Orit Malka Cohen; 15 March 1960 (age 66) Jerusalem
- Party: Religious Zionist Party (since 2015)
- Other political affiliations: National Religious Party (2005–2008); The Jewish Home (2008–2015)
- Spouse: Avraham Strook
- Children: 11, including Shoshana
- Education: Hebrew University Secondary School; Machon Meir

Orit Malka Strook (Hebrew: אורית מלכה סטרוּק; born 15 March 1960) is an Israeli far-right, religious-conservative politician. She serves as the Minister of Settlements and National Missions in the thirty-seventh government, and is a member of the Knesset for the Religious Zionist Party. She served as member of the Knesset for Tkuma (a faction within the Jewish Home) between 2013 and 2015. Strook is also among the leaders of the Jewish settlement in Hebron, and she established the Israeli non-governmental organization Human Rights Organization of Judea and Samaria, which she headed between 2004 and 2012.

== Early life ==
Orit Cohen (later Strook) was born to a family of lawyers from Hungary. Her middle name Malka was given to her in memory of her grandmother, the Hungarian Jewish poet Mária Kecskeméti. She grew up in Kiryat Yovel in Jerusalem and studied at the Hebrew University Secondary School.

As a student, Strook became interested in the teachings of Rabbi Haim Drukman and gradually became more religious. She eventually became a ba'alat teshuva and embraced Orthodox Judaism. During that period, she began studying at the religious Zionist Machon Meir yeshiva and outreach organization. Shortly thereafter, she married Avraham Strook, a student of Drukman. The young couple briefly lived in the settlement of Yamit in the Sinai Peninsula, but, after the Sinai was returned to Egypt in 1982 as part of the terms of the 1979 peace treaty, Strook and her family left. They were one of the first families to move to the Jewish settlement in Hebron. She dropped out of school to focus on caring for her family.

== Career ==
After the Cave of the Patriarchs was closed to Jewish worshippers following the 1994 massacre, Strook was elected as the head of the Women's Committee for the Cave (Hebrew: ועד נשים למען המערה), and worked to convince the political system to re-open the Cave for Jewish visitors. Since 2000, she has headed the legal-political department of the organization of Jewish settlers in Hebron. Following the Israeli government's 2002 evacuation of a family of Jewish settlers from an area of Kiryat Arba, Strook founded the Human Rights Organization of Judea and Samaria. The organization advocates for settlers arguing that the government does not treat them as equal citizens. She headed the organization from 2004 until 2012.

Strook was placed thirteenth on the joint National Union–National Religious Party list for the 2006 elections, but failed to win a seat as the alliance won only nine seats. In the 2013 elections, Strook was elected to the Knesset on The Jewish Home list. She sponsored legislation that would make labor laws apply to the West Bank. Some politicians argued that the law was a human rights measure, while others argued that it would promote Israeli seizure of the West Bank. It was later withdrawn. Strook was not elected in several subsequent elections as her party did not win enough seats.

=== Minister of Settlements and National Missions (2022—present) ===
For the 2021 elections, Strook was placed fifth on Religious Zionist Party's list, and returned to the Knesset, as the alliance won six seats. In December 2022, Strook became the first person to be appointed the Minister of Settlements and National Missions. Strook criticized Israeli security officials who called attacks against Palestinians by Jewish settlers in the West Bank "terrorism", comparing them to the Wagner Group. After a law requiring the dismantling of four settlements in the West Bank was overturned, she called for the return of settlements to Gaza. She supported proposed judicial reforms to limit the power of the Israel courts, stating that "We are abolishing the dictatorship of the High Court of Justice and enabling democracy to emerge."

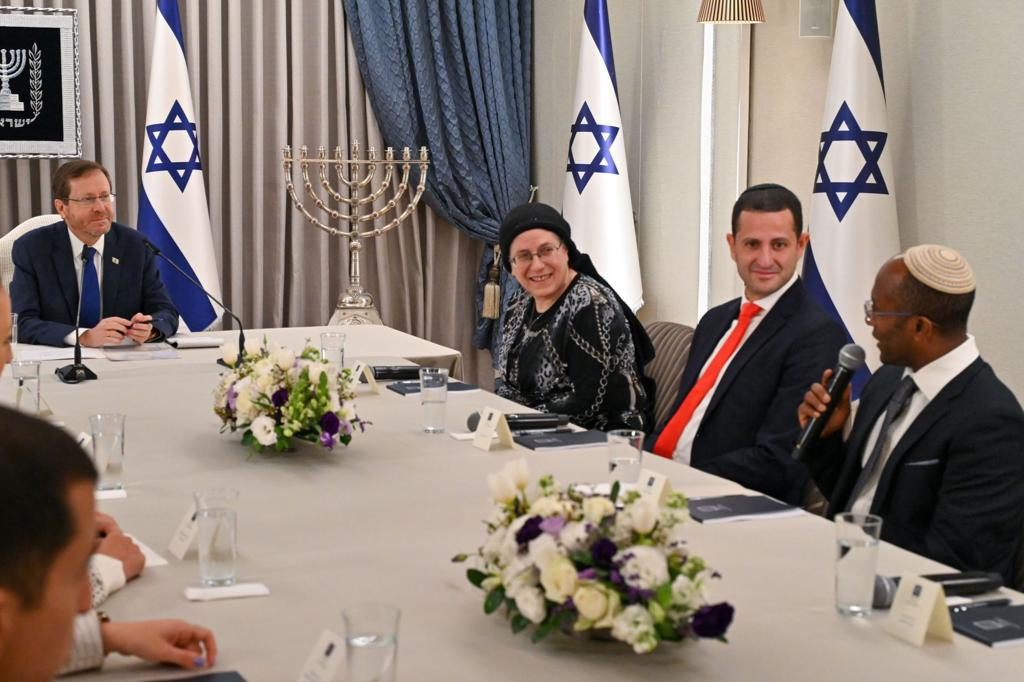
Strook and other members of the Religious Zionists' party meeting with President Isaac Herzog in 2022

Prior to the Gaza war, Strook frequently criticized the Israeli government for allowing materials into the Gaza Strip which she stated were being used by Hamas to build weapons. During the Gaza war, she opposed potential agreements for a ceasefire, which proposed Israel halting hostilities in exchange for Hamas releasing Israeli hostages. She argued that previous hostage deals had contributed to the October 7 attacks by showing Hamas that taking hostages was worthwhile to them. In response to American efforts to negotiate a ceasefire, Strook said that the United States "doesn't deserve to be called a friend of the State of Israel". She warned that her party might withdraw from the governing coalition if Israel agreed to a ceasefire.

According to YNET, Strook and Bezalel Smotrich have been credited with greatly expanding the land and power of Jewish settlers in the West Bank under Prime Minister Benjamin Netanyahu. In July 2024, Strook praised the Israeli government for expanding settlements in the Hebron Hills, stating that it was a "miraculous" time period and that "We want to accomplish as much as possible". Her comments have been criticized as depicting the Gaza war as an opportunity to expand Jewish settlements.

In May 2026, Haaretz reported that the ICC had requested arrest warrants for Strook, Smotrich, Itamar Ben-Gvir, and others. The ICC denied the report.

== Views ==
Strook is a member of the far-right Religious Zionist party. She opposes recognition of non-Orthodox movements of Judaism. After the death of Ariel Sharon in 2014, she made a Facebook post thanking God that Sharon was not able to remove Israeli settlements in the West Bank as he had removed them from Gaza. She opposes the Oslo Accords and has stated that: "Oslo is the great disaster of the State of Israel, and we are working to fix it". She supports the re-occupation of Gaza, believing it to be given to Jews by God. In December 2022, Strook suggested that doctors could refuse to treat gay people if it conflicted with their religious beliefs, as long as there were other doctors available. She stated that Jewish doctors should not be required to break Jewish law in a Jewish state.

== Personal life ==
Strook is a resident of the Avraham Avinu settlement in the city of Hebron in the occupied West Bank. She has eleven children and twelve grandchildren.

In 2007, Strook's son Zviki Strook was convicted of kidnapping and torturing a Palestinian boy, who was found naked, handcuffed, unconscious, and wounded with severe injuries. Zviki Strook was sentenced to 30 months in prison. After the conviction, Orit Strook defended her son, stating that, "Unlike the Court, who preferred to believe the Arab witnesses, we are sure of Zvi's innocence, and are hurting from the success of his haters and would assist him to deal with the difficult sentence imposed on him". In 2013 Strook sued the human rights group Machsom Watch for libel after the group released a song suggesting that she had encouraged her son to commit the crime. The organization stated that the song was satirical.

In early 2025, one of Strook's daughters, Shoshana, filed a police complaint accusing her parents of sexual and ritual abuse. The investigation by Lahav 433 Anti-Corruption Unit was subject to a gag order. According to the police, they did not find any evidence for Shoshana's accusations. The women's rights group Bonot Alternativa criticized the police investigation as inadequate. Shoshana continued to make additional accusations in social media posts, including that she had been forced to undergo conversion therapy and that her life was in danger. On 15 March 2026, it was announced that Shoshana had died and that her body had been found in Amirim, Israel. The police reported no suspicion of foul play. The cause of Shoshana's death and the validity of her allegations have been widely debated and discussed within Israel. In an interview with Israel Hayom after Shoshana's death, Strook called her "kind-hearted" and "talented" and stated that she had suffered from serious mental illness for several years.
