= Kitchen Cabinet of Israel =

Israeli political term

The Kitchen (Hebrew: המטבח, HaMitbah) or The Kitchen Cabinet (Hebrew: המטבחון, HaMitbahon or HaMitbachon, lit. The kitchenette) is a term used in Israeli politics to describe the collection of senior officials, or unofficial advisers to the Security Cabinet, as a narrow forum of 'Inner Security Cabinet', operating alongside the Security Cabinet, with the purpose of assisting it in formulating security assessments and policy, in preparation for debating and resolving these issues within the appropriate legal forums.

== History ==
The first appearance of the term in Israel comes from the cooking activities associated with former Prime Minister Golda Meir's custom of calling such consultations on Shabbat evenings at her home, in preparation for her full Cabinet meetings the following day. Meir became known for her custom of serving the attendees with a cake that she had just baked, and thus the image of a debate around her kitchen table naturally arose. Also nicknamed "Golda's kitchen", it usually included Moshe Dayan, Yigal Allon, Yisrael Galili, and Yaakov Shimshon Shapira, who were accompanied with various senior officials whenever required.

The Kitchen attendees praised it as a preliminary assessment apparatus, while its opponents have claimed it to be a manner of overriding the official governmental bodies.

Benjamin Netanyahu's first Cabinet, the twenty-seventh government, maintained such a forum which included: Netanyahu, Foreign Affairs Minister David Levy, and Defense Minister Yitzhak Mordechai. The panel was nullified in 1997, after Ariel Sharon's nomination for the Minister of Finance post was taken into consideration and he demanded that he joined the kitchen, after receiving this position, a demand which caused David Levy to quit the kitchen.

After David Levy quit the kitchen, the forum's activities were renewed in 1998, and it included Netanyahu, Mordechai, Sharon, and then Industry, Trade and Labour Minister Natan Sharansky (though intermittently, even David Levy). In January 1999, following a cabinet reshuffle in the Defense Ministry, Netanyahu announced that the Kitchen would be disbanded and replaced by a Ministers' team that included himself, Sharon, new Defense Minister Moshe Arens, and the National Security Advisor.

In Netanyahu's second Government, the thirty-second Government, there was also an active limited forum of ministers. It was first known as the Septet Forum (or the Septenary, Hebrew: השביעייה, HaShviya), and included Prime Minister Netanyahu, Ehud Barak, Avigdor Lieberman, Moshe Yaalon, Dan Meridor, Benny Begin, and Eli Yishai. With the inclusion of the Minister Yuval Steinitz to the ministerial forum the name was changed to the Octet (Hebrew: השמינייה). In August 2012 Minister Avi Dichter joined the small forum of ministers and accordingly it was renamed the Nonet forum (Hebrew: התשיעייה, HaTeshiya). With the resignation of Minister Lieberman the forum returned to an eight members structure.

In Netanyahu's Second Government (32nd Cabinet), The Inner Kitchen Cabinet, known as the Narrow Kitchen Cabinet (Hebrew: המטבחון המצומצם, HaMitbahon HaMetzumtzam) included Netanyahu, Lieberman and Barak.

== Members ==
For the current cabinet of Israel see Thirty-seventh government of Israel.

For the security cabinet of Israel see Security Cabinet of Israel.

== See also ==
- Kitchen Cabinet
