= Oury Amos Cherki =

Israeli rabbi

- אורי עמוס שרקי
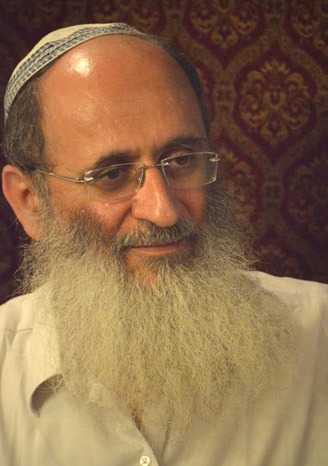
- Born: 1959 (age 66–67); Algeria
- Citizenship: Israeli
- Education: Mercaz HaRav Yeshiva
- Occupation: Chairman of Brit Olam – Noahide World Center
- Scientific career
- Workplaces: Brit Olam, Machon Meir, Rosh Yehudi

Oury Amos Cherki (Hebrew: רב אורי עמוס שרקי; born in 1959, alternative spelling Uri Sherki) is an Israeli Orthodox rabbi, chairman of Brit Olam – Noahide World Center, a senior lecturer at Machon Meir, leader of congregation "Bayit Yehuda" in the Kiryat Moshe neighborhood of Jerusalem, and has published numerous works on Jewish thought and Jewish philosophy.

== Biography ==
Cherki was born in Algeria in 1959. His grandfather, Eyzer Cherki, was a Torah scholar and community leader in Algeria, and later in France. Eyzer served as the president of the Zionist Federation of Algeria, a representative at the Zionist Congress, and was involved in the founding of Jewish education in Algeria. Cherki's father was a businessman, held a doctorate in economics, and supported his grandfather in his public activities.

Cherki lived in France as a child for a number of years. He moved to Israel in 1972, where he studied at the "Netiv Meir" Yeshiva High School, and later at Merkaz Harav Yeshiva under Zvi Yehuda Kook. He had also studied under Yehuda Leon Ashkenazi, Meir Yehuda Getz, and Shlomo Binyamin Ashlag. He performed his military service in the artillery branch of the IDF.

Cherki is involved with the organization Rosh Yehudi, and gives lectures around Israel, including courses for Jewish educators on teaching Judaism to the general public. Cherki is one of the founders of the organization Brit Olam – Noahide World Center which aims to raise awareness of the Seven Laws of Noah.

Rav Cherki publicly supported the Jewish Leadership faction of the Likud Party, and Bayit Yehudi.

=== Family ===
He is married to Ronit. They have seven children, and reside in Jerusalem. His son Yair Cherki is a journalist. His son Shalom Yochai Cherki was murdered in a terrorist attack in April 2015. Founded in the memory of Cherki's son, the non-profit, Hayu Shalom, assists families in overcoming the cycle of poverty.

== Views ==
Cherki's thought is heavily influenced by Abraham Isaac Kook and Yehuda Leon Ashkenazi (Manitou).

Cherki places emphasis on the establishment of the state of Israel. He asserts that the birth of modern political Zionism signified the "beginning of the redemption" (atchalta d'geulah), whose climax was the Balfour Declaration, and the founding of the State of Israel signified the final act in the process of redemption. He believes that from the perspective of Jewish law, the world is in the "period of the Messiah".

== Published works ==
The following is a selected list of Cherki's publications:

- Bayt Melukha - a prayer book for Israel Independence Day and Jerusalem Day (Hebrew)
- Zayt Ra'anan – a collection of articles on the Jewish holidays (Hebrew)
- "On the Eight Chapters of the Rambam" – a commentary on the Rambam's introduction to the Ethics of the Fathers (Hebrew)
- "Lessons in Kuzari" (Two Volumes) – a commentary on Rabbi Judah Halevi's work on Jewish thought (Hebrew)
- "Sanctity and Nature" – a collection of articles on various topics on personal belief, the nature of Torah, culture and lifestyle, and Zionism (Hebrew)
- "Clear Thought: World and Man in Rav Kook's Teachings" (Hebrew)
- "Lessons on Mesilat Yesharim" - a commentary on the Ramchal's work Mesilat Yesharim (Hebrew)
- "Ahead of Time – Exposing the Roots of the Holidays" (Hebrew)
- "In Good Time: Revealing the Roots of the Holidays" (Hebrew)
- "Mikedem laayin: commentary on chapter" (Hebrew)
- "I am all prayer: studies in the Siddur" (Hebrew)
- "350 words: parashot, haftarot, & more" (Hebrew)
- "Great Chidush: insights into the thought of Rabbi Oury Cherki, editor: Dan Setter" (Hebrew)
- "Brit shalom: Covenant of peace: practical applications of Noahide Laws" (Hebrew)
- "Status of Noachides in our time" (Hebrew)
- "Brit olam: prayer book for Noahides" (English)
- "About the Eight Chapters treatise of Maimonides" (Hebrew)
- "Lessons in Mesilat Yesharim" (Hebrew)
- Translation of Abraham Livni's book "The Return of Israel and the Hope of the World" from its original French into Hebrew. An English translation of the book was published in 2013.
