= Yeshivat Makor Chaim =

Coordinates: 31.65765°N 35.12332°E

- ישיבת מקור חיים
- Motto: "תאמין שיכולים לתקן"
- Motto in English: Believe that you can repair
- Established: 1985
- Affiliations: Jewish
- Officer in charge: Rabbi David Rabinowitz
- President: Rabbi Adin Steinsaltz
- Dean: Rabbi Dov Singer
- Students: 300
- Location: Nevei Daniel, Gush Etzion, West Bank
- Website: makorchaim.org

Yeshivat Makor Chaim was established in 1985 under the leadership of Rabbi Adin Steinsaltz (Even Israel). Today, the Makor Chaim Educational Institution operates a high school located in the Gush Etzion area, south of Jerusalem. It has been recognized by the Ministry of Education as an Experimental School and a Teacher Training Institution as well. The senior Rosh Yeshiva, Rabbi Dov Singer is assisted by Rabbi David Rabinowitz. In addition to the high school which serves close to 300 students annually, Makor Chaim also operates the "Beit Midrash L'Hitchadshut" (the Renewal Outreach Center), a nationwide outreach study andprayer program for personal spiritual development as well as several training and development programs for educators, administrators and others.

== Educational and religious philosophy ==
The Yeshiva is known for its Neo-Chassidic ideology. Having said that, The Yeshiva encourages students to find their own path in their Avodat Hashem (Worship of God). It is very common to find two students sitting next to each other in the Bet Midrash, with one learning Likutei Moharan (Hebrew: ליקוטי מוהר"ן, one the main books of the Breslav Chassidic sect), and the other learning a book such as Nefesh Hachaim (Hebrew: נפש החיים, whose author, R' Chaim of Volozhin was a prominent student of the Vilna Gaon and a pioneer of Lithuanian-style yeshivas). In the morning Talmud Study period, a high level Talmud class, known as "Eshkolot Iyun" (Hebrew: אשכולות עיון) is offered for interested 10th and 11th graders. A program bearing the same name is offered for students of all ages during the nightly Talmud Study period. Students have the option of learning a full double-sided pholio (Daf) of Talmud, as opposed to a one sided pholio (Amud). The core curriculum as set by the Ministry of Education is taught, but many additional options are available for interested students. Part of the core curriculum are the electives that 11th and 12th graders study. These include Physics, Biology, Literature, Environmental Studies, Computer Science, Land of Israel Studies and History.

In 2005, the Senior Rosh Yeshiva, Rav Dov Singer established the Bet Hamidrash for Renewal (Hebrew: בית המדרש להתחדשות), and the educational philosophy of the Yeshiva started to spread throughout the Israeli educational system.

Since 2007, the school has offered a joint exchange program with Yeshiva University High School for Boys in which a number of YUHSB students spend a half semester at Makor Chaim and then return with a number of YMC students who spend time at YUHSB. It is also offering a similar program with Yeshiva College of South Africa. Those programs include a class of approximately 25 foreign students living and learning in Makor Chaim for about a month, and four students from Makor Chaim going abroad for 5–6 weeks. The goal of those programs is to uplift the sense of zionism and "chious", spirit of life, in the foreign schools students' Avodat Hashem.

== Daily schedule ==
The daily schedule starts at 7:00 am with morning prayers, followed by breakfast. From 9:00 until 12:30 students learn Judaic studies, where they primarily engage in rigorous Talmud Study. Classes in Jewish Thought and philosophy are also taught in this portion of the day. After lunch, the secular studies begin at 13:30, and end at 18:30, with afternoon prayers and additional torah study from 16:20-17:10. This is followed by dinner. Evening prayers begin at 19:15, followed by an hour or two (depending on the learning program in which the student is enrolled) of Talmud Study. The remaining night hours are dedicated to homework, hobbies, relaxing, clubs, and sleep.

== The Three Boys ==
In June 2014, a national tragedy struck Makor Chaim. Three students were kidnapped from outside the grounds of the Center on a Thursday evening as they prepared to make their way home for the Sabbath. Naftali Fraenkel, Gile'ad Shear and Eyal Ifrach never made it home. An eighteen-day intensive search resulted in the discovery that the 3 boys had been murdered by their Hamas abductors moments after they were snatched.

Three months after the abduction, buoyed by the allocation of 32 dunams of land by the State of Israel, Makor Chaim and the She'ar, Ifrach and Fraenkel families "Chose Life". A campaign to build a permanent new educational campus in memory of Eyal, Gilad and Naftali was launched.

The new campus project was to begin construction by the summer of 2015. A special event marking the first anniversary of the boys kidnapping was held in June 2015.

== Notable alumni ==
- Yair Cherki, journalist
