= Yair Cherki =

Israeli journalist (born 1993)

- יאיר שרקי
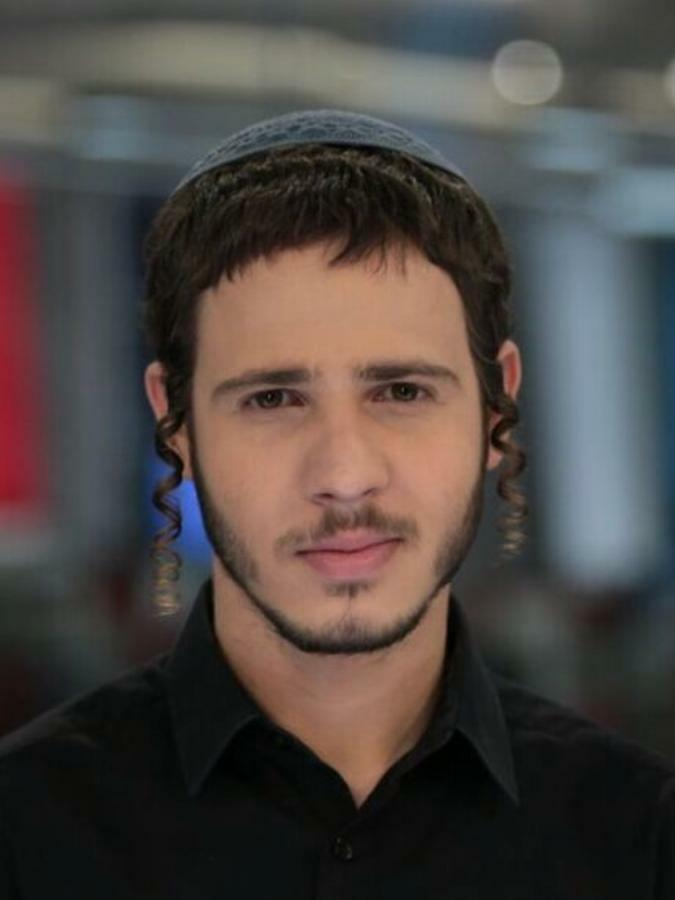
- Born: February 5, 1993 (age 33); Jerusalem, Israel
- Education: Yeshivat Makor Chaim
- Occupation: Journalist
- Years active: 2011–present
- Parent(s): Oury Amos Cherki (father); Ronit Cherki (mother)

Yair Mordechai Cherki (Hebrew: יאיר מרדכי שֶׁרקי; born 5 February 1993) is an Israeli journalist who serves as a reporter and commentator on religious and political affairs programs. He currently hosts a late-night current affairs show on Channel 12. He is also a weekly columnist for Makor Rishon newspaper, and presents a weekly current affairs program on Israeli Army Radio.

== Early life ==
Cherki was born and raised in the Jerusalem neighbourhood of Kiryat Moshe to a National Religious family. He is the fourth of seven children of Oury Amos Cherki, a senior lecturer at Machon Meir and rabbi of the Kiryat Moshe community, and Ronit Sharki, a biology researcher. His brother, Shalom Yochai, was killed in a terror attack in 2015. He was educated at Yeshivat Makor Chaim, a high school yeshiva in Gush Etzion. In 2011, after graduating, he enlisted with the Israel Defense Forces for his conscription period. He served with Israeli Army Radio, where he was the religious affairs correspondent.

== Career ==
In 2014, he began working as a religious affairs correspondent for Channel 2 news. In 2016, he was named by Forbes Israel as one of the top 30 "Most promising young people" in the country. In addition to his TV role, he presented a current affairs morning radio show from January to July 2017 on Galey Israel Radio.

In 2017, he began writing a weekly current affairs column for B'Sheva. He left the newspaper in 2020, to begin writing a new weekly political column for Makor Rishon newspaper.

In 2018, B'nai B'rith World Center awarded him the Journalistic Excellence Award in the Israeli Media for coverage of Diaspora Jewry and Israel-Diaspora Relations, for his series of articles, "Brooklyn of the Holy".

In September 2021, he was named as the "most trusted" political commentator in a survey commissioned by the Israeli news website, Walla. He was named as the "most trusted" journalist in September 2022 in a separate survey conducted by Prof. Yitzhak Katz.

In November 2023, following the start of the Gaza war, he began hosting a Late Night program on Channel 12 with journalist Haim Levinson. After a short time, Avri Gilad replaced Levinson, and the name of the program was changed to Avri and Cherki.

In July 2024, he returned to Israeli Army Radio, and began hosting a weekly current affairs program every Thursday with Hila Korach.

=== Impact ===
He is credited for building greater understanding of Haredi Jews and their lifestyles. In his reporting, he takes viewers into the homes of the Haredim, gently asking his hosts to explain their beliefs.

== Personal life ==
In February 2023, he came out as gay. He wrote: "I have always lived with the clash between this sexual orientation and faith," adding that: "There are those who solved the conflict by saying there is no God, and there are others who have said there are no gays. In my flesh, I know they both exist, and I try to resolve this internal conflict in multiple ways."

Cherki received broad support from political figures in Israel, from Right to Left, including former Israeli Prime Minister, Naftali Bennett; Likud's openly-gay Knesset speaker, Amir Ohana; and Merav Michaeli, leader of the Israeli Labor Party.
