= Daniel Amram =

Israeli journalist (born 1997)

- דניאל עמרם
- Born: August 13, 1997; Bnei Brak, Israel
- Citizenship: United States
- Known for: Journalism
- Website: daniel-amram.com

Daniel Amram (Hebrew: דניאל עמרם; born August 13, 1997) is an Israeli journalist and social activist.

== Biography ==
Amram was born into an Orthodox-Lithuanian family and grew up in Bnei Brak. He is the fifth of nine children and studied at the Orhot Torah yeshiva.

As a teenager, he began questioning his religion. He documented his feelings on Facebook and posted videos of himself destroying a Bible and carrying bread during Passover. After posting a video of himself burning tefillin and accusing rabbis of "forc[ing] religion on people in Israel", he was arrested in 2018. Amram received significant criticism and threats, prompting him to move to the United States. Later, he apologized for burning the tefillin. He lived in Florida and then settled in New York.

== Work ==
After moving to the US, Amram began posting on TikTok about celebrity gossip, cryptocurrency scammers, and other stories not covered by conventional news sources. He also began investigating crimes and posting his findings on social media. In October 2022, he investigated the killing of Yoel Lhanghal, an Indian immigrant to Kirya Shmona. According to Amram, he posted video of himself confronting the perpetrators and the police used his video in their investigation. In June 2023, he investigated a Facebook video of three people harassing a queer soldier on a bus in Tel Aviv. Amram was able to identify the people involved, leading to their arrest. He also investigated violence at the 2023 Israeli judicial reform protests and sexual abuse allegations.

In July 2023, Amram exposed young men attacking foreign workers on bicycles. The police made arrests, and the attacks ceased. That month, he also published a four-part investigation on ultra-Orthodox network star Livi Nakhimovski, leading to an episode of "Exposure" where Nakhimovski presented her side. The investigation series was later removed.

Amram's content is posted to his website as well as social media networks like Telegram, TikTok, Twitter and YouTube. He relies on volunteers to help him in his investigations. Amram has spoken about his reluctance to post certain content such as videos of Hamas killing Israeli soldiers, calling it "voyeuristic, unnecessary, and mainly painful". Amram has also stated that he does not identify as a journalist.

=== Reception ===
Amram has been called a guerrilla journalist and an activist. The Jerusalem Post has described him as "a Twitter user who exposes the identities of those who commit crimes on video". Haaretz called him "an internet sensation, with his online sleuthing leading to numerous breakthroughs". Amram has been threatened and sued. He has also been accused of spreading misinformation, violating gag orders, and violating people's privacy. Journalist Avishai Grinzaig criticized Amram's coverage of allegations by Shoshana Strook as immoral. The Israeli police have issued several arrest warrants against him, including in April 2026, for unknown reasons.

As of January 2024, Amram has a Telegram channel with 365 thousand subscribers, an X (formerly Twitter) channel with 55 thousand followers, two YouTube channels with about 100 thousand followers combined, and an Instagram account with 112 thousand followers. Amram also operates a TikTok channel with about 300 thousand followers.
