= Moran Zer Katzenstein =

Israeli social and women's rights activist

- מורן זר קצנשטיין
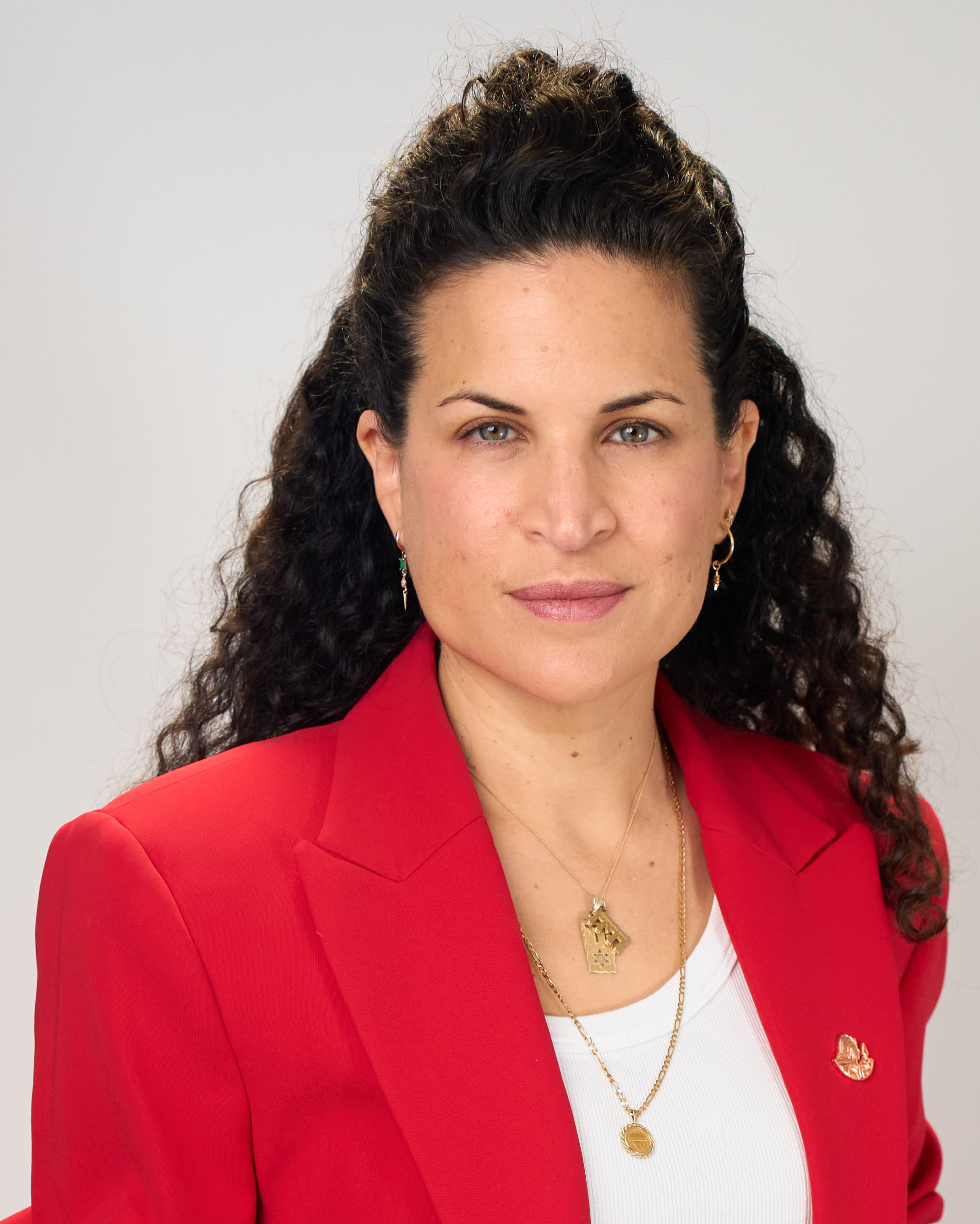
- Moran Zer Katzenstein in 2025
- Born: 13 August 1982 (age 44); Migdal HaEmek, Israel
- Education: College of Management Academic Studies
- Occupations: Lecturer; director
- Organization: Women Building an Alternative (Bonot Alternativa)
- Known for: Social activism
- Political party: The Democrats
- Children: 4

Moran Zer Katzenstein (Hebrew: מורן זר קצנשטיין; born 13 August 1982) is an Israeli women's rights activist, lecturer, social activist, strategist and media personality. She is among the initiators of the coalition of women's organizations and founder of "Bonot Alternativa" (Women Building an Alternative; Hebrew: בונות אלטרנטיבה), an organization active in the 2023 Israeli judicial reform protests.

== Biography ==
Moran Zer Katzentstein was born in Holon, Israel, the eldest of three. Her family lived in Migdal HaEmek, and moved back to Holon when she was five.

She grew up in a religious household but attended a secular school. Zer Katzenstein was active in the Bnei Akiva youth movement. She completed her studies at Katzir highschool in Holon where she studied media & communication. During her IDF military service, Zer Katzenstein served as a human resources officer and was honorably discharged with the rank of lieutenant.

After her army service, she pursued her bachelor's degree in communication and management at the College of Management Academic Studies and in conjunction served in an operational role in the Shin Bet. She completed her degree in 2007. She completed her master's degree in business administration in 2010 at the same college.

Zer Katzenstein is a married mother of four and lives in Holon in central Israel.

== Business and marketing career ==
Zer Katzenstein began her professional career in 2009 as a brand manager for L'Oréal. In 2011, she began to work as a brand manager for Coca-Cola where she later managed the retail marketing branch. Between 2015 and 2017, Zer Katzenstein was a marketing lecturer at the College of Management.

In 2016, she was appointed VP of marketing at Honigman where she worked until 2018. She later went on to work as a marketing director at Google.

In 2020, she founded a creative strategy agency and a school for YouTube professions entitled "yyy".

In 2021, she joined the management team at Playtika as head communications officer and senior director.

== Social activism ==
=== Bonot Alternativa ===
While vacationing in Eilat with her family, she heard of a gang raping incident that had taken place and decided to organize a protest movement to draw attention to the biased treatment of women". She founded Bonot Alternativa, "Women Building an Alternative", in 2020, through the unionization of business women, entrepreneurs, CEOs, media personalities, social activists, and heads of women's organizations. In 2023, Bonot Alternativa became an official association.

Zer Katzenstein currently heads Bonot Alternativa.

=== Judicial overhaul ===
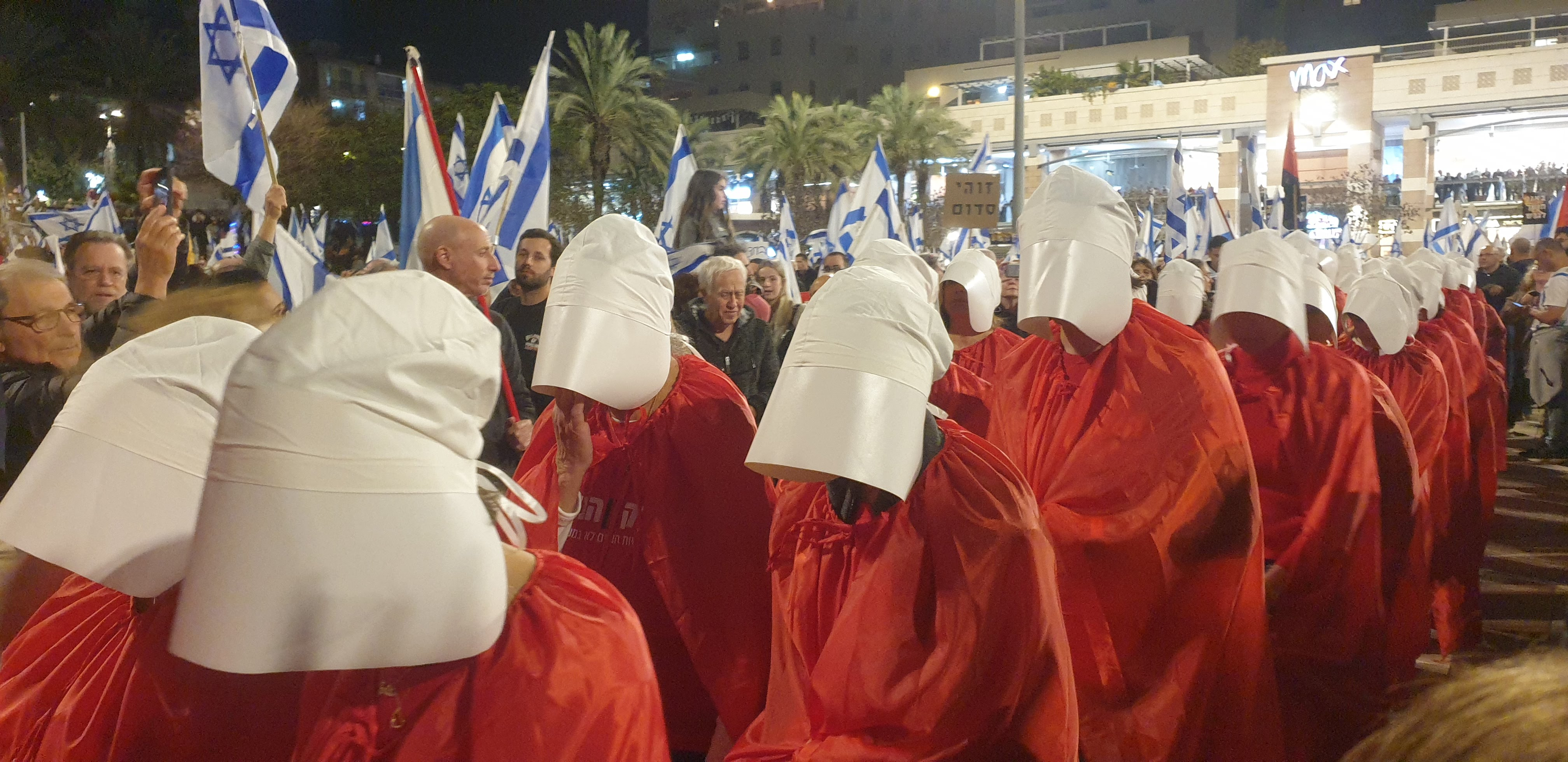
Women dressed in red cloaks as part of the 2023 Israeli judicial reform protests, 11 March 2023

In 2023, as part of the 2023 Israeli judicial reform protests, Bonot Alternativa, under her leadership, initiated the "Handmaids' Protest" which drew inspiration from Margaret Atwood's novel, The Handmaid's Tale and also the TV series The Handmaid's Tale which is based on it. The exhibition included hundreds of women throughout Israel silently marching in red cloaks. The handmaids became the symbol of the protests against judicial reform and brought the movement led by Zer Katzenstein to the forefront of the struggle, while Zer Katzenstein serves as a frequent speaker at rallies across the country.

On the morning of 29 June 2023, Zer Katzenstein was detained for questioning by police during a protest near the home of the Minister for the Advancement of the Status of Women, May Golan. According to Zer Katzenstein, the Minister is "single-handedly hurting the ongoing struggle for women's rights in Israel". Zer Katzenstein was released shortly afterward.

== Political activism ==
In May 2026, Yair Golan, Chairman of the Democrats Party, announced that Zer Katzenstein had joined the party. In the primary elections held on July 20, 2026, ahead of the 2026 Israeli legislative election, Zer Katzenstein came in at number twelve on the slate.

== Awards and recognition ==
- 2023 - "Knighthood" Prize by the Peres Center for Peace and Innovation

== See also ==
- Women of Israel
