= Human Rights Organization of Judea and Samaria =

Israeli NGO

The Human Rights Organization of Judea and Samaria (also Yesha Human Rights Organization (Hebrew: ארגון זכויות אדם ביש"ע) was an Israeli non-governmental organization (NGO) headed by Orit Strook.

The organization was established in 1999. Its stated goals are to defend the human and civil rights of Jewish Israelis living in the West Bank, and formerly in the Gaza Strip. The organization say that these citizens – commonly referred to as settlers – are not adequately defended by other human rights organizations it identifies as left-wing, such as B'Tselem. The organization cooperates and uses the legal advice of the Legal Forum for the Land of Israel.

One aspect of its activities is to report on alleged discrimination of settlers by the Israeli Police.
