= André Neher =

French philosopher (1914–1988)

André Neher (22 October 1914 – 23 October 1988) was a French Jewish scholar and philosopher.

== Biography ==
Neher was born in Obernai, Bas-Rhin. He was a student at the Collège Freppel in Obernai, then at the Lycée Fustel de Coulange in Strasbourg. He became professor at the Collège Erckmann-Chatrian in Phalsbourg, then at the Lycée Kléber in Strasbourg. During World War II, he lived in Brive-la-Gaillarde, where he was a member of Rabbi David Feuerwerker's community. After the War, he became a professor at the University of Strasbourg in 1948. In 1974, at age 60, Neher moved with his wife, Renée Neher-Bernheim to Jerusalem, Israel.

=== L'Exil de la Parole ===
His masterpiece is The Exile of the Word (L'Exil de la parole. Du silence biblique au silence d'Auschwitz, Ed. Seuil, 1970), about the biblical silence, and God's silence after the Shoah and the great world tragedies. Neher thinks that through the Bible's silence one can discover divine revelation; through the silence human freedom is possible. He draws on the image of a suspension bridge to describe human "ontological insecurity and pain" caused by this freedom, which is characterized by a "radical factor of uncertainty". For this reason it is necessary to concentrate our attention not on the ideas of redemption or salvation, but on "being here in our life".

L'espoir n'est pas dans le rire et dans la plénitude.
L'espoir est dans les larmes, dans le risque et dans leur silence

— André Neher, L'Exil... p.256

Hope is not in the laugh or fullness.
Hope is in the tears, in the risk and in their silence

— André Neher, L'Exil... p.256

== Writings ==
- Transcendance et immanence (1946; Transcendence and immanence)
- Amos, contribution à l'étude du prophétisme (1950; Amos, contribution to the study of the prophecy)
- L'Essence du prophétisme (1955; Quality of Prophecy)
- Notes sur Qohélét (1951; Notes on Ecclesiastes)
- Moïse et la vocation juive (1956; Moses and the vocation of the Jewish people)
- Le Conflit du sacré et du profane dans la renaissance de l'hébreu (1958; The conflict of sacred and profane in the renaissance of Hebrew)
- Jérémie (1960; Jeremiah)
- Histoire biblique du peuple d'Israël (1962; Biblical history of the people of Israel) — with Renée Neher
- L'Existence juive (1962; The Jewish Existence)
- Le Puits de l'Exil, la théologie dialectique du Maharal de Prague (1962; The Well of the Exile, dialectical theology of Maharal of Prague)
- De l'hébreu au français. Manuel de l'hébraïsant : la traduction (1969; From Hebrew to French) — a manual for translating the Hebrew language into French
- L'Exil de la Parole. Du silence biblique au silence d'Auschwitz (1970; The Exile of the Word, from the silence of the Bible to the silence of Auschwitz)
- Dans tes portes, Jérusalem (1972; Within your gates, Jerusalem)
- Ils ont refait leur âme (1979; They rebuilt their soul) ISBN 2-234-01192-2
- Jérusalem, vécu juif et message (1984; Jerusalem, Lived Jerusalem And Message) ISBN 2-268-00287-X
- David Gans, 1541-1613 : disciple du Maharal, assistant de Tycho Brahe et de Jean Kepler (1974; David Gans, 1541-1613 : disciple of Maharal, assistant of Tycho Brahe and of Johannes Kepler) ISBN 2-252-01723-6; English translation as Jewish thought and the scientific revolution of the sixteenth century : David Gans (1541-1613) and his times (1986) OUP. ISBN 978-0-19-710057-8.
- Faust et le Maharal de Prague : le mythe et le réel (1987; Faust and Maharal of Prague : myth and reality) ISBN 2-13-039777-8.
- They made their souls anew. Albany, N.Y : State University of New York Press, 1990.
- "At the methodological crossroad: The dispute with Eliezer Ashkenazi" in Rabbinic Theology and Jewish Intellectual History: The Great Rabbi Loew of Prague (2013) ISBN 978-0-415-50360-0

== See also ==
- Isaac Luria
- David Gans
- Maharal of Prague
- Jacob L. Moreno
