= Josh Breiner =

Israeli journalist

- ג'וש בריינר
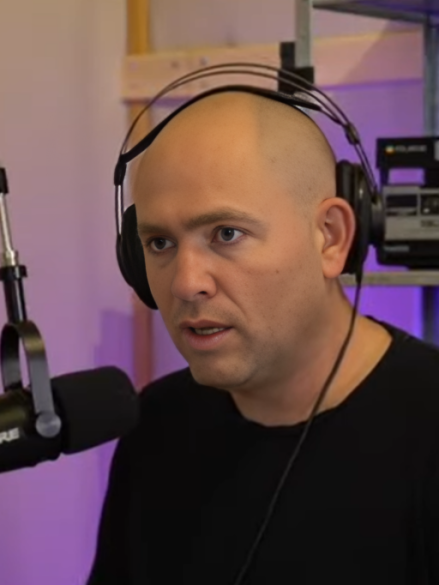
- Josh Breiner, 2024
- Born: March 24, 1986 (age 40); Toronto, Canada
- Education: Ono Academic College; Bar-Ilan University
- Occupations: journalist; publicist
- Years active: 2004–present
- Known for: journalism
- Awards: Uri Avnery Prize for Courageous Journalism (2023); Prize for Journalistic Excellence from the Israel Press and Media Institute (2024); Sokolov Award (2025)

Joshua "Josh" Breiner (Hebrew: יהושע "ג'וש" בריינר; born March 24, 1986) is an Israeli journalist who serves as the criminal correspondent for the newspaper Haaretz. He is a lawyer by training.

== Biography ==
Breiner was born in Toronto, Canada, to Aaron and Miriam, religious Zionist educators. The family immigrated to Israel in 1986, and Breiner grew up in Ashkelon.

At the age of 14, he began working for Maariv LeNoar, while studying at the Bnei Akiva Nativ Meir Yeshiva in Jerusalem. He later served as a sports reporter for the local newspaper Kan Darom, after graduating from the Tzvia Yeshiva in Ashkelon. In 2004, he enlisted in the IDF and served as a military correspondent for the weekly Bemahane. In this capacity, he covered the implementation of the disengagement plan and the evacuation of the communities from Gush Katif, as well as the Second Lebanon War. In his reserve role, he serves as a casualty informant in the IDF Casualty Unit with the rank of Major.

Upon his release from the IDF in 2007, he began working as a military correspondent for the "Walla" website. He later served as a correspondent for the site in the West Bank and the Gaza Strip and was head of the Territories Correspondents' Unit. In November 2010, after publishing an article dealing with leaflets distributed against the Samaria Brigade, he was questioned with a warning at the Ariel police station for insulting a public servant and violating privacy. Following the investigation, the Press Council contacted the police and a press petition was sent to the Police Commissioner and the State Attorney. In February 2011, the investigation was closed due to lack of guilt by order of the head of the Investigations and Intelligence Division, Chief Yoav Seglowitz, who even apologized to Breiner for opening the investigation against him.

In 2014, he left journalism. He studied law at the Ono Academic College and interned in the Police Investigations Department at the State Attorney's Office, where he was involved, among other things, in the investigation of the Ronal Fisher affair and sexual affairs of police officers. In 2015, he completed his internship and, after passing the Bar Association exams, began to practice as a lawyer. That same year, he returned to the media at the "Walla" website, first as a legal affairs reporter and later as a senior editor and director of the reporting team in the news department, where he served as deputy. In 2017, he moved to the "Haaretz" newspaper, where he serves as a police and criminal affairs correspondent.

He was a member of the panel of the program "The Patriots" (Channel 14) starting in 2019 and represented the political left. In June 2023, he announced that he was taking a break from participating in the program. Breiner won the Uri Avnery Prize for Courageous Journalism in 2023, the Prize for Journalistic Excellence from the Israel Press and Media Institute in 2024 and the Sokolov Prize for Written Journalism in 2025. The prize was awarded to Breiner "for his writing, which placed on the public agenda questions relating to freedom of expression, human rights and the rule of law. His writing exposed serious deficiencies in the law enforcement system, including in the office in charge of it and the minister who heads it, while demonstrating journalistic courage and a firm and uncompromising stance against centers of power stronger than himself. Through his investigations and revelations, he has more than once succeeded in causing a real change in reality."

Breiner is behind a series of exposés and critical publications concerning the Minister of National Security, Itamar Ben-Gvir. For example, the revelation that Benzi Gopstein, who was convicted of inciting racism, was an advisor to the Minister of National Security, Ben-Gvir's convictions for 79 traffic offenses and the exposure of his serious traffic history, a lawsuit by a foreign worker against Ben-Gvir in which the minister was ordered to pay approximately 100,000 shekels, an incident during which Ben-Gvir eluded his security guards who were forced to pursue him, the sale of lulavs by his chief of staff, Hanamal Dorfman, during which he gave a civilian his personal pistol, the Shin Bet's decision to stop sending representatives to meetings with Ben-Gvir after he abused a senior member of the organization, and the distribution of weapons licenses to associates by members of the Ben Gvir Bureau.

== Investigative reporting and exposés ==
Among other things, he published the following exposés:

A 2010 investigation that revealed that government ministries were transferring budgets to the Od Yosef Hai Yeshiva in Yitzhar, which is considered by the Shin Bet to be a hotbed of right-wing extremism in Samaria. Following the investigation, the state stopped funding the institution, among other things, in light of the Shin Bet's recommendation.

In December 2012, he revealed a recording of Minister Silvan Shalom admitting that a committee established by the government, headed by retired judge Edmond Levy, was appointed because it was known in advance that its members would write a report supporting the right-wing position regarding outposts and settlements in the West Bank, and because Levy was a former Likud member.

Many revelations in the Umm al-Hiran car-ramming incident, including the police's failures in the incident, the police and Shin Bet's versions, and the refusal of State Attorney Shai Nitzan to investigate those involved in the incident.

Exposing the investigation of 3 Shin Bet agents by a special team of the Ministry of Justice on suspicion that they ordered female soldiers to search the genitals of a Palestinian detainee without reason.

Exposing the email affair of the head of the police's human resources department, Gila Gaziel, in which it was revealed that emails from Gaziel's computer were deleted as part of an investigation by the State Comptroller into unusual expenses for the farewell event with former Commissioner Yohanan Danino. Following the publication, Gaziel was interrogated with a warning by the MHA (מח"ש).

The disclosure of the transcripts of the interrogation of the head of Lahav 433, Superintendent Roni Ritman, during which he raised the possibility that the complaints filed against him for sexual offenses were due to the summoning of the Prime Minister's wife, Sara Netanyahu, for questioning in the Prime Minister's Residence affair.

The publication of the numerous investigative failures in the rape of the 7-year-old girl in the Binyamin settlement in June 2019 led the Chief Military Advocate to drop the indictment against the defendant in the case.

The publication that Hanamal Dorfman, who serves as the right-hand man of the Minister of National Security Itamar Ben-Gvir, functions as his chief of staff and signs official documents on behalf of the ministry in this capacity, even though he is not a civil servant. In response to the publication, the Minister's office decided not to invite Breiner to the official annual toast. Following the decision, additional police officers announced that they would not attend the event. In solidarity with Breiner.

Disclosure of the affair in which the head of the Arab Crime Prevention Division in the police, Chief Jamal Hakrush, was recorded leaving the scene of a murder in Kfar Kana while tripping over the body without providing him with medical assistance or calling the police. Following the disclosure, Hakrush resigned from the police.

Disclosure of the investigation of Police Commissioner Avshalom Peled, who was investigated for abuse of office, fraud, and breach of trust after he was suspected of seeking to approve construction violations in his home in Moshav Zacharia in exchange for the appointment of a close associate of the head of the Mate Yehuda Council to a position in the police. Among other things, Breiner revealed Peled's construction violations file as well as the transcript of wiretapping with the head of the council, which was discussed as part of a bribery case that was investigated for 4 years in prison. Following the revelation of the scandals that began to emerge in the Advisory Committee for Senior Civil Service Appointments, Peled announced the withdrawal of his candidacy for the position of Police Commissioner after Ben Gvir requested to appoint him to the position.

== Personal life ==
Breiner is married, has two daughters, and lives in Modi'in. He holds a Master's degree in Law in the Public-Criminal track from Bar-Ilan University and serves as a lecturer on media and law at various conferences.
