= Pizza Hut Israel =

Israeli franchise of Pizza Hut

Pizza Hut Israel (פיצה האט)
- Logo used since 2026

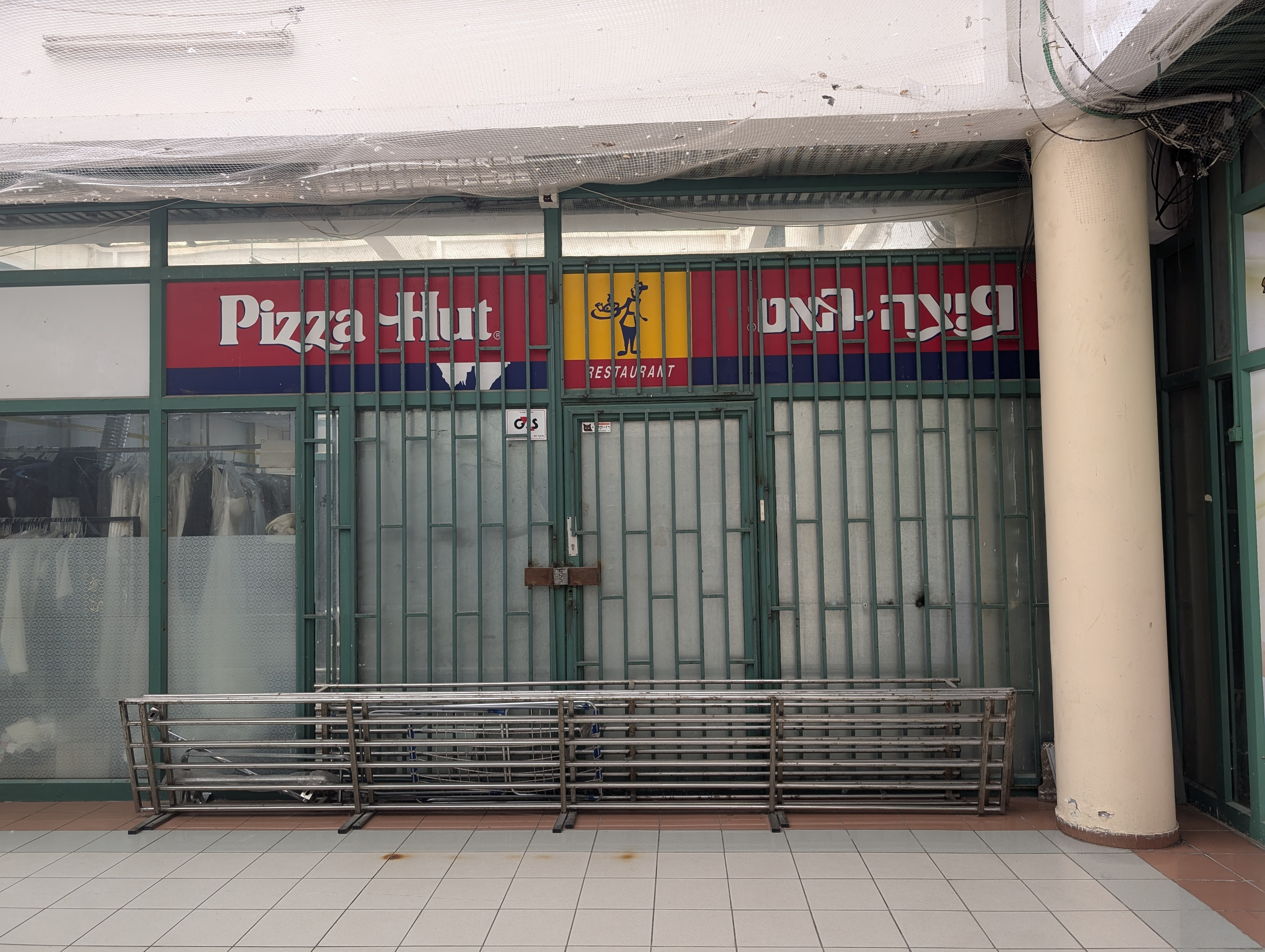
- Old Pizza Hut restaurant, interior of the almost-abandoned "Center Park" shopping center in Rova He (Quarter 5), Ashdod. Photographed in July 2024.
- Type: Subsidiary
- Industry: Fast-food restaurant
- Founded: Tel Aviv , Israel (1990; 36 years ago)
- Headquarters: Tel Aviv, Israel
- Number of locations: 91 (September 2014)
- Area served: Israel
- Key people: CEO - Udi Shamai
- Products: Pizza
- Brands: WingStreet Israel
- Number of employees: 800
- Parent: Pizza Hut
- Website: pizzahut.co.il

Pizza Hut Israel (Hebrew: פיצה האט) is the Israeli franchise of Pizza Hut with 56 branches as of September 2014. Pizza Hut Israel is the largest pizza chain in Israel.

== History ==
Pizza Hut Israel opened their first restaurant in 1990, under the master franchisee Clal Chains, a subsidiary of Clal Industries. Initially the chain opened many restaurants in Israel and was very successful. In 1996, the investing company Penthouse's manager Shlomo Duhoki bought the business from Clal Chains for US$12M. In 2002, the energy company Dor Alon bought Pizza Hut Israel from Shlomo Duhoki. In 2005, Udi Shamai became a partner in the company with Dor Alon continuing to hold 30% of the business. In 2008, Udi bought the rest of the shares from Dor through his company Tabasco Holdings. By the time of this announcement Pizza Hut was down to 25 branches, from 33 branches in 2002. Some of the branches that remained were moved from large sit down locations to smaller delivery focused locations. At the time of the acquisition the chain was down to 20 branches. Tabasco although retaining ownership of some locations, also began franchising other locations in Israel.

During 2010, Niv Zilberstien joined Udi Shamai and became a Share holder in Tabasco Holdings.

In August 2013, Pizza Hut Israel released an Android and iPhone app to allow customers to track their order status in real time.

In 2013, Pizza Hut Israel reached 50 branches, and as of September 2014 there were 56 branches Pizza Hut was operating 78 stores as of October 2016.

== Kashrut ==
Pizza Hut Israel only carries kosher products. Most stores carry kashrut mehuderet, a higher level of kashrut.

== Passover ==
A number of Pizza Hut Israel locations remain open during Passover. Due to the Chametz Law in Israel, no restaurant can serve any chametz product, including pizza, during Passover.

In 2014, 18 branches remained open during Passover.

== Fare ==
Pizza Hut Israel offers a wide selection of food, including the traditional deep dish; they also offer a thin crust pizza. In addition to pizza, they offer salads, quiche, focaccia, and various desserts.

== West Bank franchises ==
Many fast food chains in the West Bank, such as McDonald's, have trouble getting franchises without going through an Israeli franchisee. Pizza Hut, however, did not feel this was needed, and allowed the first Palestinian owned location to open in Ramallah in 2012. Under the Israeli franchise agreement, Pizza Hut has also allowed Israeli franchises to open in areas that are internationally recognised to be illegal settlements under international law, leading to calls for a global boycott of the company.

== Social media ==
In May 2017, Pizza Hut Israel was embroiled in an international controversy as a result of Pizza Hut Israel's Twitter account posting a tweet mocking Palestinian prisoners on hunger strike. This led to further calls for a global boycott of the company, under the hashtag #boycott_pizzahut, additional to the calls already in place as a result of franchises operating in the West Bank. In response, Pizza Hut apologized, deleted the tweet and fired the PR firm who created the ad.

== In popular culture ==
In 2013, CEO and owner Udi Shamai appeared on the third episode of the first season of Undercover Boss Israel.

== See also ==
- Culture of Israel
- Israeli cuisine
- Economy of Israel
- List of pizza chains
- List of restaurants in Israel
