= Women Building an Alternative =

Israeli protest movement

- בונות אלטרנטיבה
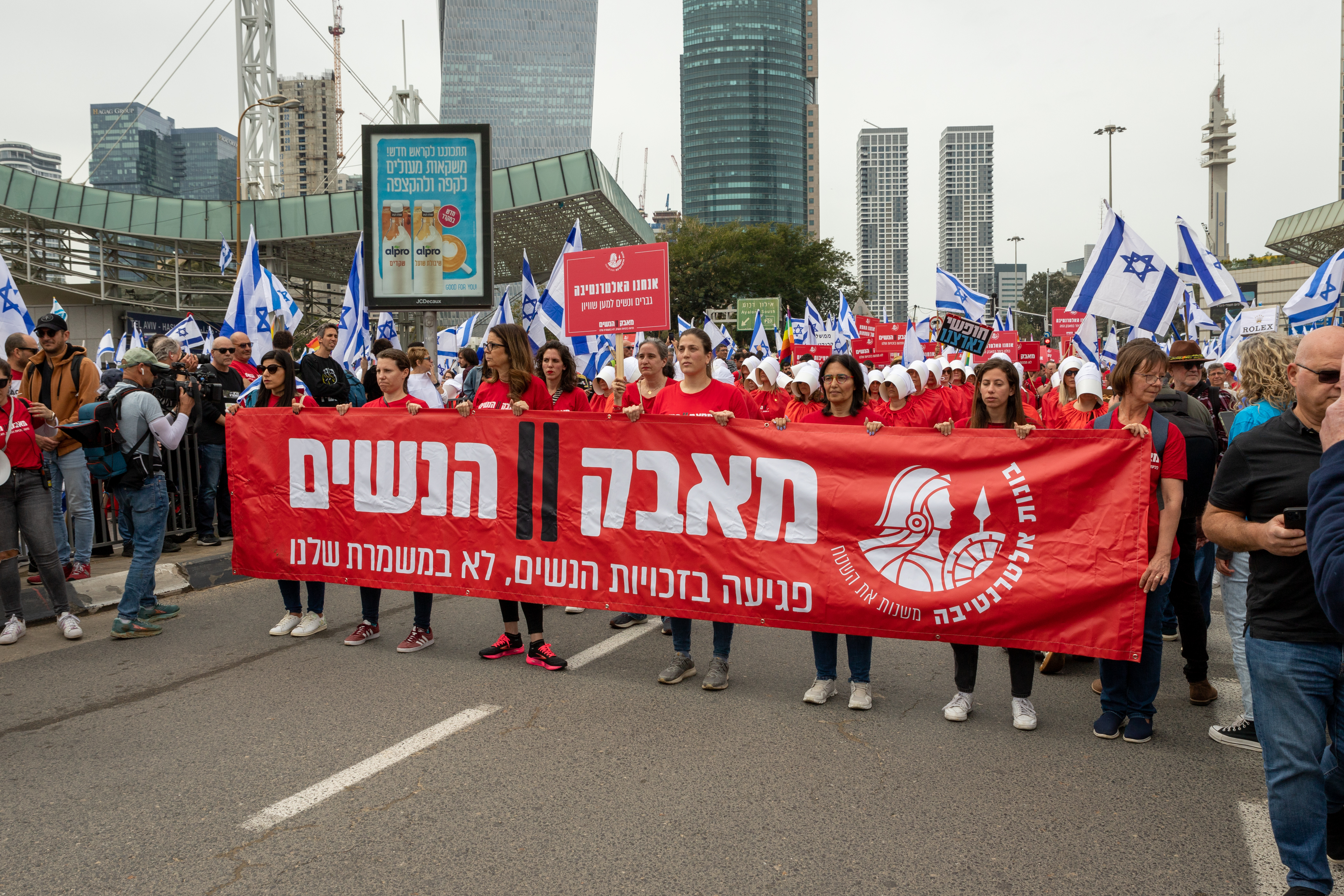
- Formation: 2020
- Founders: Moran Zer Katzenstein
- Location: Israel
- Services: Advocacy; Protest activities
- Website: www.bonot.org

Women Building an Alternative (Hebrew: בונות אלטרנטיבה), also known as Bonot Alternativa, is an Israeli social activist organization that seeks to promote social equality, empower women and raise awareness of violence against women. The group was founded in 2020 by Moran Zer Katzenstein, who brought together business women, entrepreneurs, female CEOs, media women, social activists and heads of women's organizations.

== History ==
Bonot Alternativa's first campaign was a women's strike in 2020 in response to the raping of a girl in Eilat. Thirty demonstrations were held around the country with a central rally in Rabin Square, Tel Aviv in which over 5000 women participated. Dozens of organizations and companies joined the protest. Commercial companies, including Pelephone, Yes and Bezeq International closed their branches in solidarity.

Hadas Regulski serves as the organization's spokesperson.

Hundreds of women from all segments of society have joined action groups affiliated with the organization. Through social media platforms, thousands have joined the organization's field initiatives and educational programs.

== Activities ==
In 2021, the movement led a viral campaign, "#Shavot_Mashvot" (Hebrew: שוות_משוות#), to raise awareness of bias against women in the business sector, encourage promoting women to management positions and reduce wage gaps.

In January 2022, the movement initiated a campaign in partnership with other women's organizations calling for the incorporation of sex education in the school curriculum. The Ministry of Education convened a roundtable discussion that led to the formulation of guidelines on gender education. Beginning in 2023, this topic has been included in the school curriculum.

In June 2022, the movement stood behind two minors who said they had been sexually abused at a party. A demonstration was held outside the venue of an Eyal Golan concert, attracting media attention and garnering support for the appeal of the two minors, which was subsequently accepted.

Bonot Alternative has collaborated with other women's organizations to enforce the electronic tagging law, organizing a demonstration outside the residence of former Prime Minister Yair Lapid calling for strict enforcement of the law and ratification of the Istanbul Convention.

In June 2023, the organization protested outside the home of May Golan, Minister for the Advancement of Women, during which Katzenstein was briefly detained for questioning by the police.

=== Handmaids' protest ===
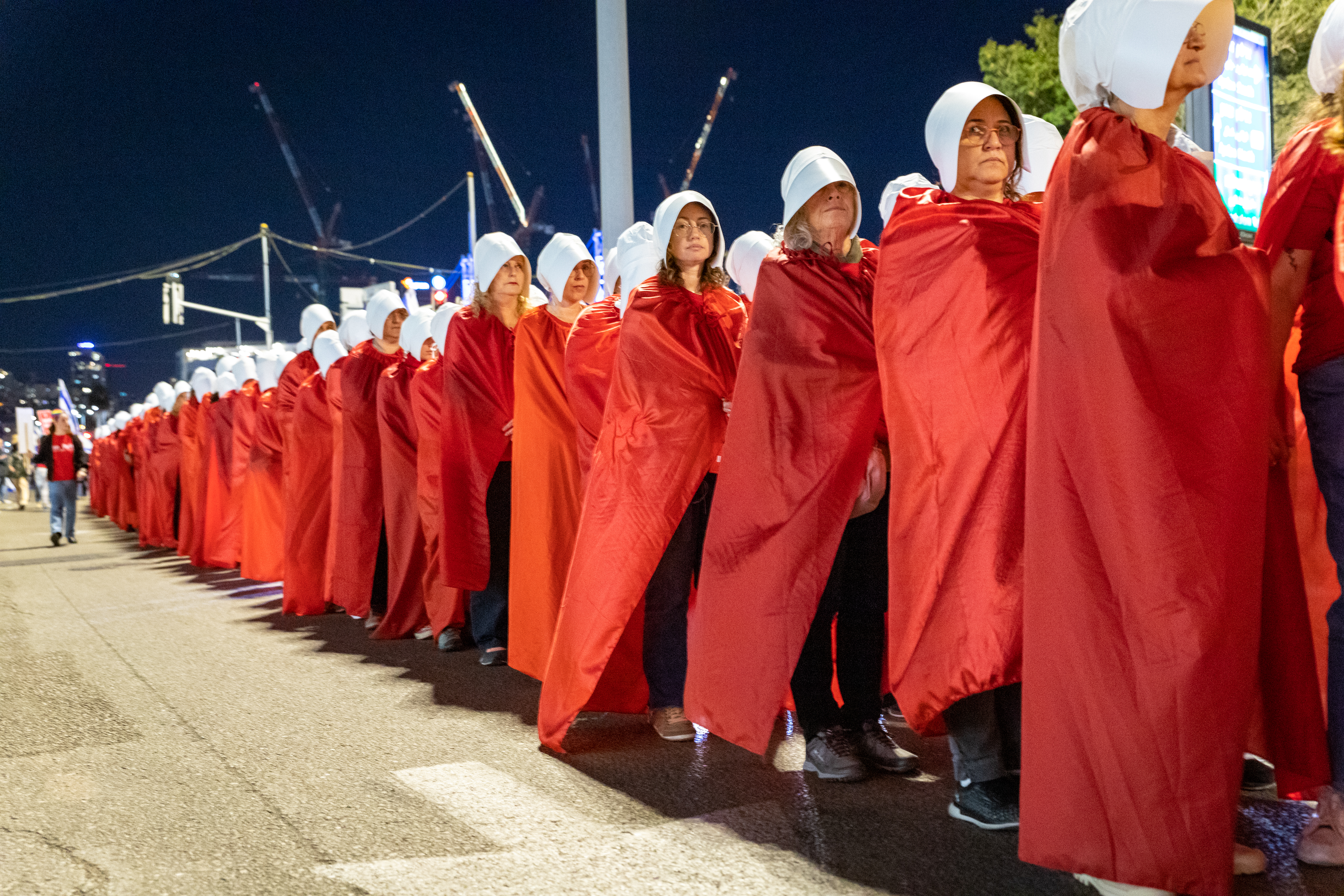
Demonstrating against the judicial reform

In 2023, as part of the protest against judicial reform, the women of the movement led by Moran Zer Katzenstein initiated the "Handmaids' Protest" inspired by Canadian author Margaret Atwood's book, The Handmaid's Tale. Hundreds of women dressed in red robes solemnly marched in silence, symbolically representing slave girls.

Atwood shared a video on Twitter of the women dressed like the handmaids marching in Tel Aviv, calling it astonishing. The author added, "I have never seen so many 'Handmaids' protesters marching like this except in the @HandmaidsOnHulu tv series!".

=== Activity during 2023 Gaza war ===
Following the unexpected missile 2023 Hamas attack on Israel and the massacre in the southern region and the resulting Gaza war, the organization swiftly repurposed its entire infrastructure for relief efforts. To this end, Women Building an Alternative collaborated with Brothers in Arms and other organizations that had previously been primarily focused on protest activities.
