= Ministry of Settlement and National Missions =

Israeli government ministry

- משרד ההתיישבות והמשימות הלאומיות
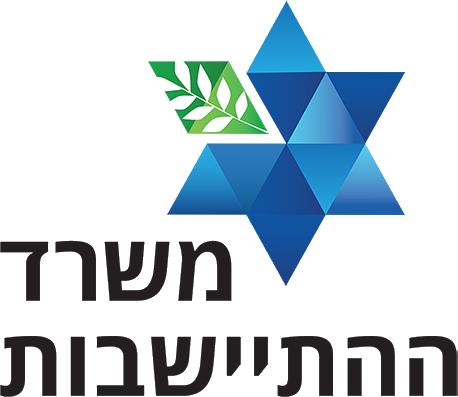

Government ministry overview
- Formed: 2020 (officially in December 29, 2022)
- Headquarters: Jerusalem, Israel
- Minister responsible: Orit Strook
- Government ministry executive: Avi Meir
- Website: gov.il/he/departments/ministry_of_community_affairs/govil-landing-page

Ministry of Settlement and National Missions (Hebrew: משרד ההתיישבות והמשימות הלאומיות; or simply Ministry of Settlement; Hebrew: משרד ההתיישבות) is an Israeli government ministry that was established in the thirty-fifth government of Israel and became officially independent on 29 December 2022 as part of coalition agreements in the thirty-seventh government of Israel.

The ministry is responsible for the Settlement Division, a body that operates as part of the World Zionist Organization to promote the establishment of Israeli settlements in the West Bank and the Galilee. The ministry is also responsible for Sherut Leumi, a government body that operates alternative voluntary form of national service in Israel.

== History ==
After the April 2019 Israeli legislative election, a political crisis began, as no party was able to form a majority government. Subsequently, in 2020, Netanyahu made a coalition agreement with the Religious Zionist Party to establish the Ministry of Settlement and National Missions. On 1 November 2022, the 2022 Israeli legislative election took place, and Netanyahu managed to form a government with 64 seats, officially establishing the ministry on 29 December 2022 and providing it with a budget of 190,000,000 shekels (approximately $60,023,730).

Israeli far-right, religious-conservative Knesset member Orit Strook of the Religious Zionist Party was appointed to head the ministry and Avi Naim was appointed to its CEO.

On 19 February 2023, the Israeli government transferred the Division for Jewish Culture from the Ministry of Education and the Ministry of Religious Services to the Ministry of Settlement and National Missions.

== Ministry units ==
- Planning and Control Division: Division that involves the activities of the World Zionist Organization's Settlement Division, which serves as the executive arm of the Israeli government in establishing and consolidating Israeli settements in the West Bank and the Golan Heights.
- National Civil Service Authority: Government authority that manages the national service system in the State of Israel.
- Mechina Division: Division responsible for the Mechina (pre-military preparatory) system in the State of Israel.
- Jewish Culture Division: Division responsible for the dissemination of Jewish culture in the Israeli education system.
- Jewish Identity Division: Division responsible for promoting and funding of projects designed to "strengthen Jewish identity".
- Missionary Communities Division: Division responsible for providing support and guidance to missional groups throughout the country, specifically to religious Zionists groups such as Bnei Akiva.

== Ministers ==
#	Portrait	Name	Party	Office Term	Government
1		Tzipi Hotovely	Likud	15 June 2020 - 2 August 2020	Thirty-fifth government of Israel
2		Tzachi Hanegbi	Likud	3 August 2020 - 13 June 2021	Thirty-fifth government of Israel
3		Naftali Bennett	Yamina	13 June 2021 - 8 November 2022	Thirty-sixth government of Israel
		Yair Lapid (transitional term)	Yesh Atid	8 November 2022 - 29 December 2022	Thirty-sixth government of Israel
4		Orit Strook	Religious Zionist Party	29 December 2022 - Present	Thirty-seventh government of Israel
