= List of members of the twenty-sixth Knesset =

Israeli legislature

26th Knesset
←	25th

Overview
- Meeting place: Knesset building, Jerusalem
- Term: 10 November 2026 –
- Election: 27 October 2026
- Government: 38th (prospective)
- Website: Knesset

Knesset
- President: Isaac Herzog
- Prime minister: TBD
- Speaker: Matan Kahana, Yashar

The members of the 26th Knesset were elected on 27 October 2026 and sworn in on 10 November. As of November 2026, this list reflects the current composition of the Knesset.

Emerging from the completion of the 25th Knesset's full four-year term, the first to do so without early dissolution since 1988, the incoming parliament will convene following an election shaped by the aftermath of the 7 October attacks, subsequent Gaza war and regional conflicts, and domestic debates over judicial reform and Haredi military conscription.

== History ==
=== Inauguration ===
On 10 November 2026, the 120 members of the 26th Knesset were sworn in.

2026 Knesset speaker election
- 17 November 2026

Needed to win: Majority of the votes cast 118 votes cast; 59 needed for a majority (Note: Yasir Hujeirat of Ra'am and Nir Barkat of Likud did not vote)
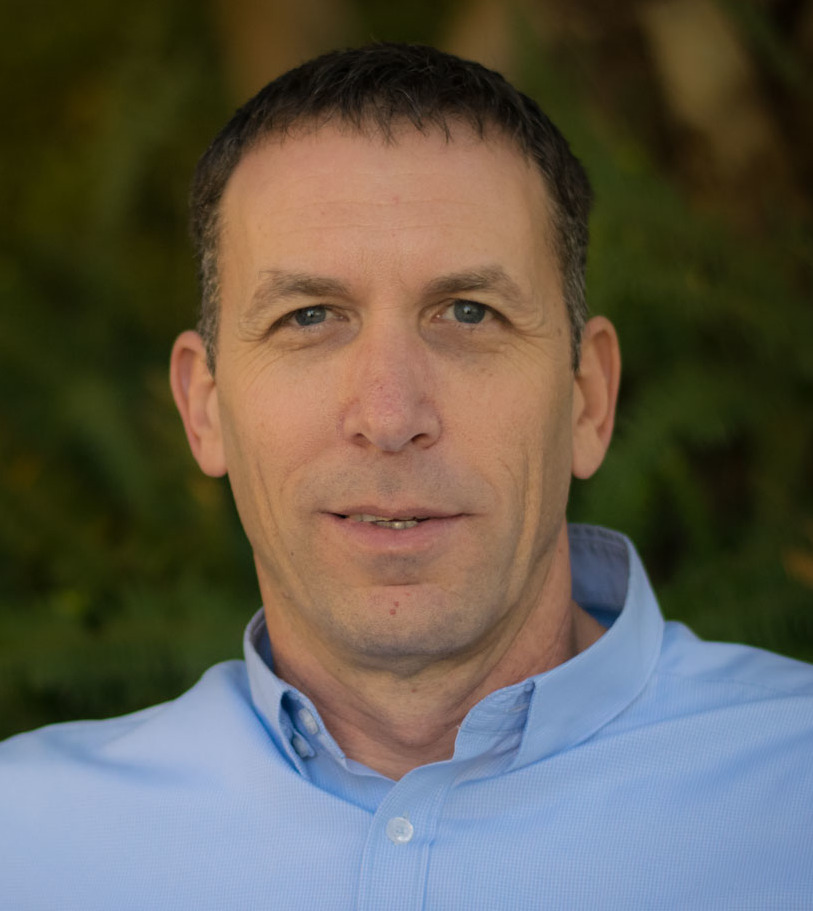

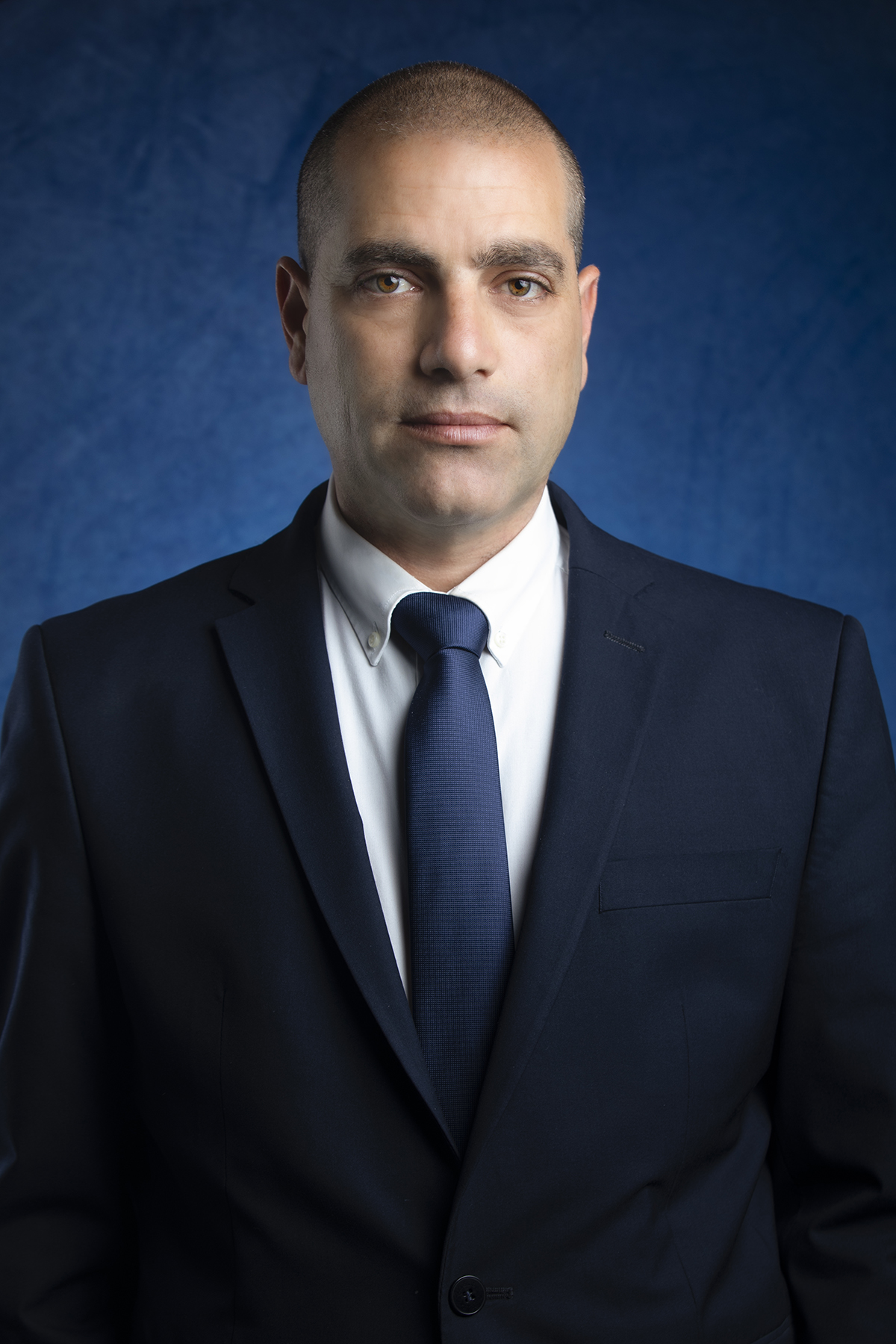
	Majority party	Minority party
Candidate	Matan Kahana	Ofir Katz
Party	Yashar	Likud
Members' vote	66	52
Speaker before election
Amir Ohana
Likud
Elected Speaker
Matan Kahana
Yashar

On 17 November, 67 MKs requested an election to replace Knesset speaker Amir Ohana. Matan Kahana of Yashar received 66 votes, winning the election, while his opponent, Ofir Katz of Likud, received 52 votes.

=== Legislative activities ===
On 18 November 2026, the Knesset passed a preliminary reading of a bill that would reverse parts of the 2025 Israeli judicial reform aimed at changing the composition of the Judicial Selection Committee. The Knesset also passed preliminary readings for several Likud-sponsored bills due to an opposition boycott, which included legislation to protect the laying of tefillins in public areas, and another to deny salaries to Knesset members who do not recognize Hamas as a terrorist organization.

== Composition ==
Two Druze lawmakers, 33 women and 46 new MKs were elected to the 26th Knesset.

== List of members ==
After the end of vote counting, the final incoming members list for the 26th Knesset is as follows:

Faction	Party	Name
Likud (27)	Likud	Benjamin Netanyahu
Likud (27)	Likud	Eli Cohen
Likud (27)	Likud	Amir Ohana
Likud (27)	Likud	Yariv Levin
Likud (27)	Likud	Miri Regev
Likud (27)	Likud	Israel Katz
Likud (27)	Likud	Gideon Sa'ar
Likud (27)	Likud	Ofir Katz
Likud (27)	Likud	Talik Gvili
Likud (27)	Likud	Yoav Kisch
Likud (27)	Likud	Yaakov Bardugo
Likud (27)	Likud	Miki Zohar
Likud (27)	Likud	Almog Cohen
Likud (27)	Likud	Amichai Chikli
Likud (27)	Likud	Elisha Medan
Likud (27)	Likud	David Peter
Likud (27)	Likud	Moshe Saada
Likud (27)	Likud	Haim Katz
Likud (27)	Likud	Dudi Amsalem
Likud (27)	Likud	Eti Atiya
Likud (27)	Likud	Boaz Bismuth
Likud (27)	Likud	David Bitan
Likud (27)	Likud	Shlomo Karhi
Likud (27)	Likud	Nir Barkat
Likud (27)	Likud	Gila Gamliel
Likud (27)	Likud	Eli Goldschmidt
Likud (27)	Likud	Erez Tadmor
Yashar (21)	Yashar	Gadi Eisenkot
Yashar (21)	Yashar	Yoram Cohen
Yashar (21)	Yashar	Orit Farkash-Hacohen
Yashar (21)	Yashar	Adi Altschuler
Yashar (21)	Yashar	Matan Kahana
Yashar (21)	Yashar	Hili Tropper
Yashar (21)	Yashar	Shaul Meridor
Yashar (21)	Yashar	Tair Ifergan
Yashar (21)	Yashar	Oshrat Gani Gonen
Yashar (21)	Yashar	Shira Shapira
Yashar (21)	Yashar	Inbar Harush Gity
Yashar (21)	Yashar	Elazar Stern
Yashar (21)	Yashar	Kamil Abu Rokon
Yashar (21)	Yashar	Deborah Sharifian Bachar
Yashar (21)	Yashar	Alex Rif
Yashar (21)	Yashar	Inbar Yehezkeli Blilious
Yashar (21)	Yashar	Roy Folkman
Yashar (21)	Yashar	Israel Zari
Yashar (21)	Yashar	Tal Ohana
Yashar (21)	Yashar	Elyasaf Peretz
Yashar (21)	Yashar	Yaffa Tebeje
Together (12)	Bennett 2026	Naftali Bennett
Together (12)	Yesh Atid	Yair Lapid
Together (12)	Bennett 2026	Keren Terner Eyal
Together (12)	Yesh Atid	Meirav Ben-Ari
Together (12)	Bennett 2026	Liran Avishar Ben-Horin
Together (12)	Yesh Atid	Noam Tibon
Together (12)	Bennett 2026	Michal Hirsch Negri
Together (12)	Bennett 2026	Eitan Ginzburg
Together (12)	Yesh Atid	Meirav Cohen
Together (12)	Bennett 2026	Yonatan Shalev
Together (12)	Bennett 2026	Bruria Naim Arman
Together (12)	Yesh Atid	Ram Ben-Barak
Joint List (11)	Hadash	Yousef Jabareen
Joint List (11)	Ta'al	Ahmad Tibi
Joint List (11)	Hadash	Faten Ghattas
Joint List (11)	Balad	Bakhar Awawdeh
Joint List (11)	Hadash	Ofer Cassif
Joint List (11)	Hadash	Youssef Atauna
Joint List (11)	Balad	Maha Karkabi
Joint List (11)	Ta'al	Ahmed Darawshe
Joint List (11)	Hadash	Nihaya Washahi
Joint List (11)	Balad	Hassan Nassasra
Joint List (11)	Ta'al	Haitham Zahalka
The Democrats (8)	The Democrats	Yair Golan
The Democrats (8)	The Democrats	Naama Lazimi
The Democrats (8)	The Democrats	Gilad Kariv
The Democrats (8)	The Democrats	Efrat Rayten
The Democrats (8)	The Democrats	Yaya Fink
The Democrats (8)	The Democrats	Gaby Lasky
The Democrats (8)	The Democrats	Omri Ronen
The Democrats (8)	The Democrats	Michal Rozin
Ra'am (8)	Ra'am	Mansour Abbas
Ra'am (8)	Ra'am	Yoav Segalovitz
Ra'am (8)	Ra'am	Waleed Taha
Ra'am (8)	Ra'am	Waleed Alhwashla
Ra'am (8)	Ra'am	Iman Khatib-Yassin
Ra'am (8)	Ra'am	Yasir Hujeirat
Ra'am (8)	Ra'am	Ibrahim Al-Turi
Ra'am (8)	Ra'am	Abd El-Karim Masri
Yisrael Beiteinu (7)	Yisrael Beiteinu	Avigdor Lieberman
Yisrael Beiteinu (7)	Yisrael Beiteinu	Rafi Ben Shitrit
Yisrael Beiteinu (7)	Yisrael Beiteinu	Talya Lankri
Yisrael Beiteinu (7)	Yisrael Beiteinu	Oded Forer
Yisrael Beiteinu (7)	Yisrael Beiteinu	Yulia Malinovsky
Yisrael Beiteinu (7)	Yisrael Beiteinu	Sharon Sharabi
Yisrael Beiteinu (7)	Yisrael Beiteinu	Hamad Amar
Otzma Yehudit (7)	Otzma Yehudit	Itamar Ben-Gvir
Otzma Yehudit (7)	Otzma Yehudit	Tally Gotliv
Otzma Yehudit (7)	Otzma Yehudit	Yitzhak Wasserlauf
Otzma Yehudit (7)	Otzma Yehudit	Amihai Eliyahu
Otzma Yehudit (7)	Otzma Yehudit	Limor Son Har-Melech
Otzma Yehudit (7)	Otzma Yehudit	Yitzhak Kroizer
Otzma Yehudit (7)	Otzma Yehudit	Hanamel Dorfman
United Torah Judaism (7)	Degel HaTorah	Ya'akov Asher
United Torah Judaism (7)	Agudat Yisrael	Yitzhak Goldknopf
United Torah Judaism (7)	Degel HaTorah	Yitzhak Pindrus
United Torah Judaism (7)	Homat Torat Yisrael	Meir Porush
United Torah Judaism (7)	Degel HaTorah	Moshe Rosenthal
United Torah Judaism (7)	Homat Torat Yisrael	Eliakim Stark
United Torah Judaism (7)	Degel HaTorah	Yehuda Weisfish
Shas (6)	Shas	Yinon Azulai
Shas (6)	Shas	Michael Malchieli
Shas (6)	Shas	Yoav Ben-Tzur
Shas (6)	Shas	Haim Biton
Shas (6)	Shas	Uriel Buso (Note: Buso entered the Knesset after Dror Amos did not take his seat.)
Shas (6)	Shas	Yosef Taieb (Note: Taieb entered the Knesset after Moshe Abutbul did not take his seat.)
Religious Zionist Party and Zehut (6)	Religious Zionist Party	Bezalel Smotrich
Religious Zionist Party and Zehut (6)	Zehut	Moshe Feiglin
Religious Zionist Party and Zehut (6)	Religious Zionist Party	Orit Strook
Religious Zionist Party and Zehut (6)	Religious Zionist Party	Simcha Rothman
Religious Zionist Party and Zehut (6)	Religious Zionist Party	Tzvika Mor
Religious Zionist Party and Zehut (6)	Religious Zionist Party	Itamar Eitam
