= Thirty-eighth government of Israel =

Cabinet formed after the 2026 election

- 38th Cabinet of Israel

People and organisations
- President: Isaac Herzog
- Prime minister: TBD
- No. of ministers: TBA
- Status in legislature: TBD

History
- Election: 2026 Knesset election
- Legislature term: 26th Knesset
- Predecessor: 37th government

The thirty-eighth government of Israel will be the next cabinet of Israel following the 2026 Israeli legislative election.

== Formation ==
After the 2026 election did not result in a clear winner, major party leaders began outlining the potential for government formation. Yashar leader Gadi Eisenkot reiterated his vision for a "Zionist government" with "national service for all", who discussed "establishing a good government in Israel" in a meeting with Together leader Naftali Bennett. Ahmad Tibi from the Joint List voiced support for an Eisenkot-led government, although Ra'am leader Mansour Abbas saw a minority government from Eisenkot as unlikely. Likud leader Benjamin Netanyahu also began coalition talks with right-wing bloc members.

Yisrael Beiteinu leader Avigdor Lieberman notably softened his stance on Haredi conscription following the election, indicating that he would be open to forming a government with Haredi parties and would "compromise" on the issue of conscription.

=== Recommendation ===
President Isaac Herzog announced on 2 November that he would meet with all elected parties and receive their recommendations for prime minister from 4–5 November 2026, choosing to break convention by meeting with the smallest parties first in an effort to "encourage thinking outside the box." On 4 November, Herzog met with smaller parties with Religious Zionist Party, Zehut, Shas and Yisrael Beiteinu, then continued with larger parties on 5 November with United Torah Judaism, Otzma Yehudit, The Democrats, Ra'am, the Joint List, Together, and Yashar before concluding with Likud. Following the end of consulations, Eisenkot received 67 recommendations while Netanyahu received 46.

Israeli government formation, November 2026
- 4-5 November 2026
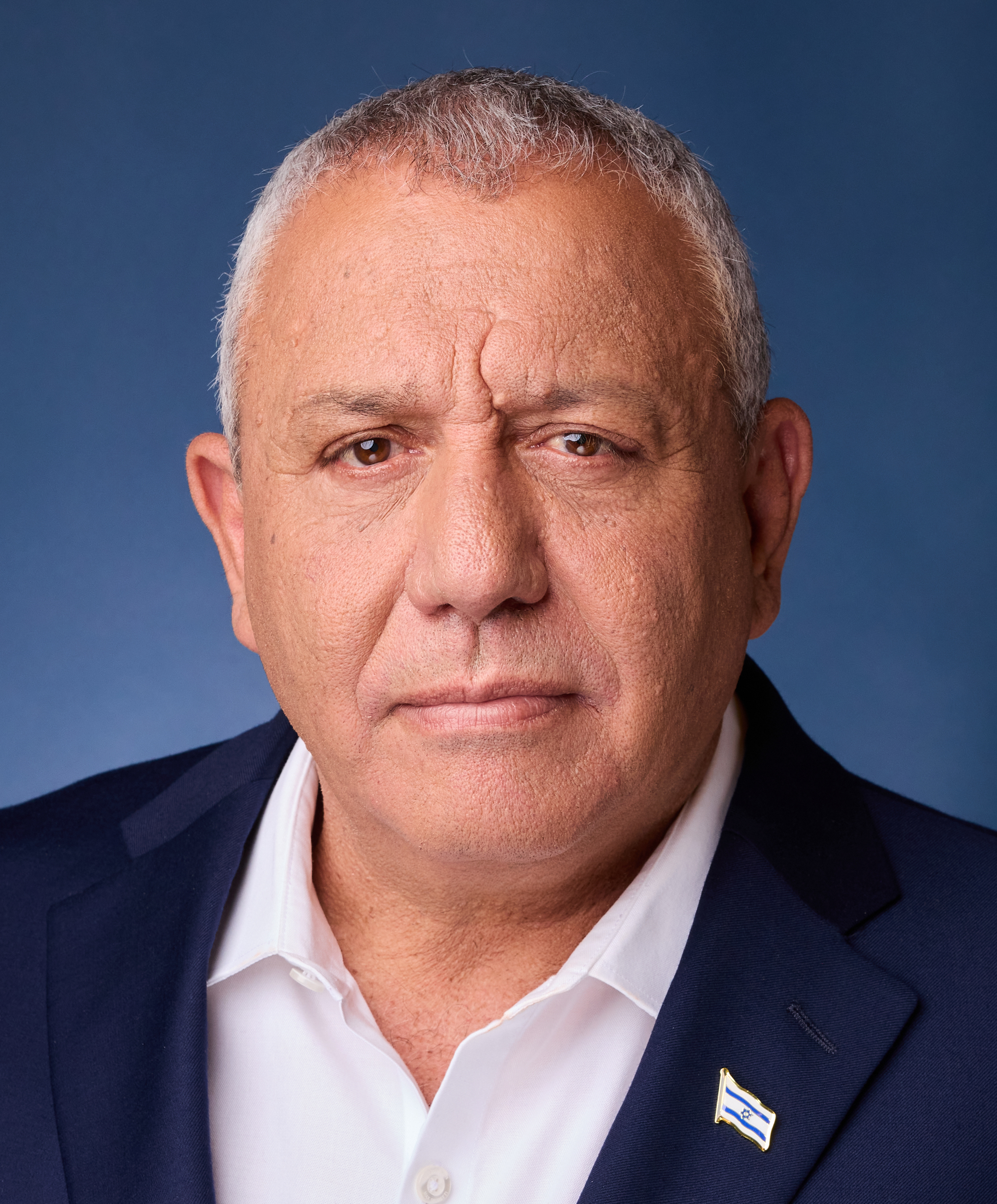

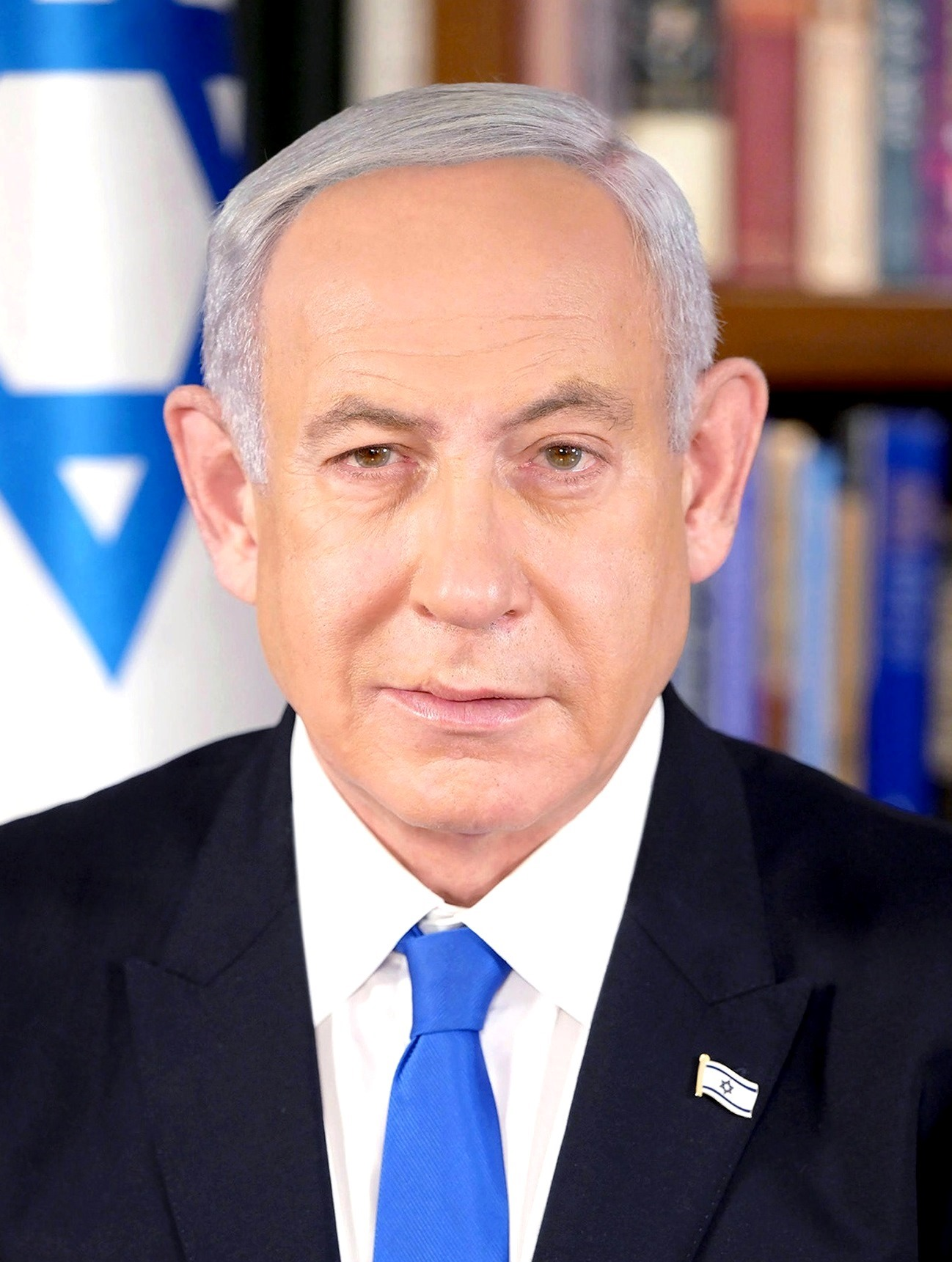
| Nominee | Gadi Eisenkot | Benjamin Netanyahu |
| Party | Yashar | Likud |
| Electoral vote | 67 | 46 |
Prime Minister before election
Benjamin Netanyahu
Likud
Outcome
TBD

| Party | Party leader | Seats | Recommended | Ref. |
|---|---|---|---|---|
| Likud | Benjamin Netanyahu | 27 | Netanyahu | |
| Yashar | Gadi Eisenkot | 21 | Eisenkot | |
| Together | Naftali Bennett | 12 | Eisenkot | |
| Joint List | Yousef Jabareen | 11 | Eisenkot | |
| Democrats | Yair Golan | 8 | Eisenkot | |
| Ra'am | Mansour Abbas | 8 | Eisenkot | |
| Yisrael Beiteinu | Avigdor Lieberman | 7 | Eisenkot | |
| Otzma Yehudit | Itamar Ben-Gvir | 7 | Netanyahu | |
| UTJ | Ya'akov Asher | 7 | No one | |
| Shas | Aryeh Deri | 6 | Netanyahu | |
| Religious Zionism | Bezalel Smotrich | 5 | Netanyahu | |
| Zehut | Moshe Feiglin | 1 | Netanyahu | |

=== Eisenkot's mandate ===
Herzog indicated on 7 November that the mandate would be given to Eisenkot, and officially presented the mandate for government formation to Eisenkot at Beit HaNassi the next day.

Negotiations revealed divisions within the change bloc over potential coalition partners, with some "hawkish members" opposing cooperation with the Arab-led Ra'am and Joint List, while others opposed working with Netanyahu and Haredi parties. Yashar expressed openness to sit in coalition with Likud members without Netanyahu. Netanyahu, meanwhile, called for a national unity government that would include his existing allies, known as the national camp. There was also discussion that United Torah Judaism may join an Eisenkot-led government, although no agreement was reached.

MK Ofir Katz and Michael Rabello, both of Likud, met with Yashar MK Chili Tropper and Yoav Horowitz, in addition to Together representative Shalom Shlomo, on 14 November to talk about the "possibility" of a unity government between the parties.

==== Speaker replacement ====
2026 Speaker of the Knesset election
- 17 November 2026

Needed to win: Majority of the votes cast 118 votes cast; 59 needed for a majority
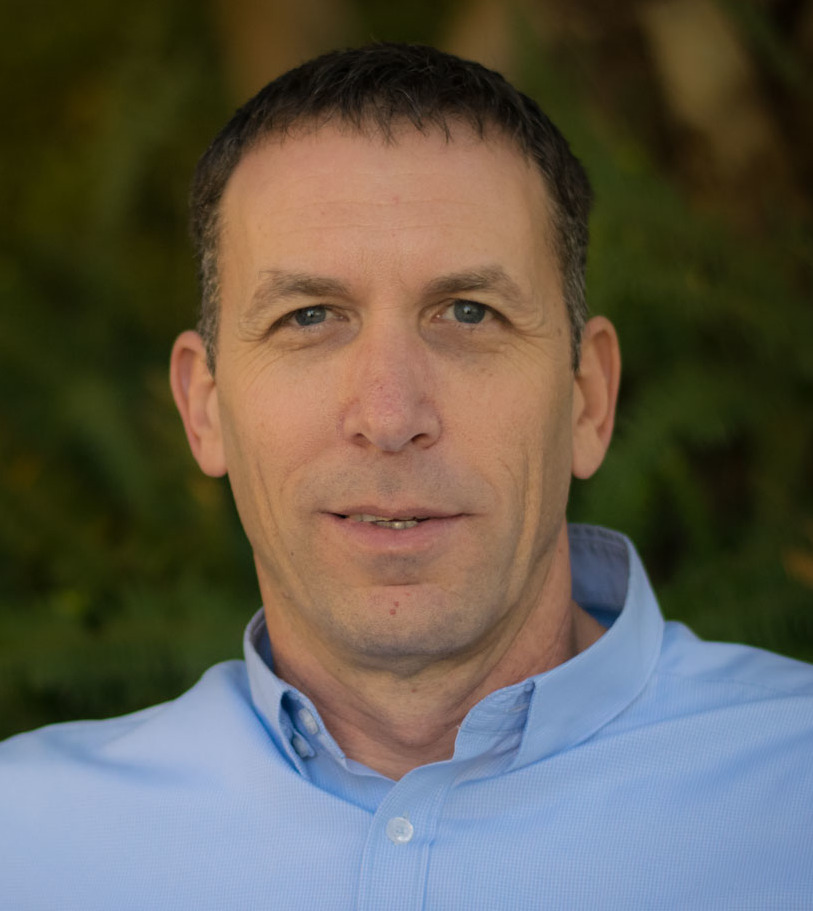

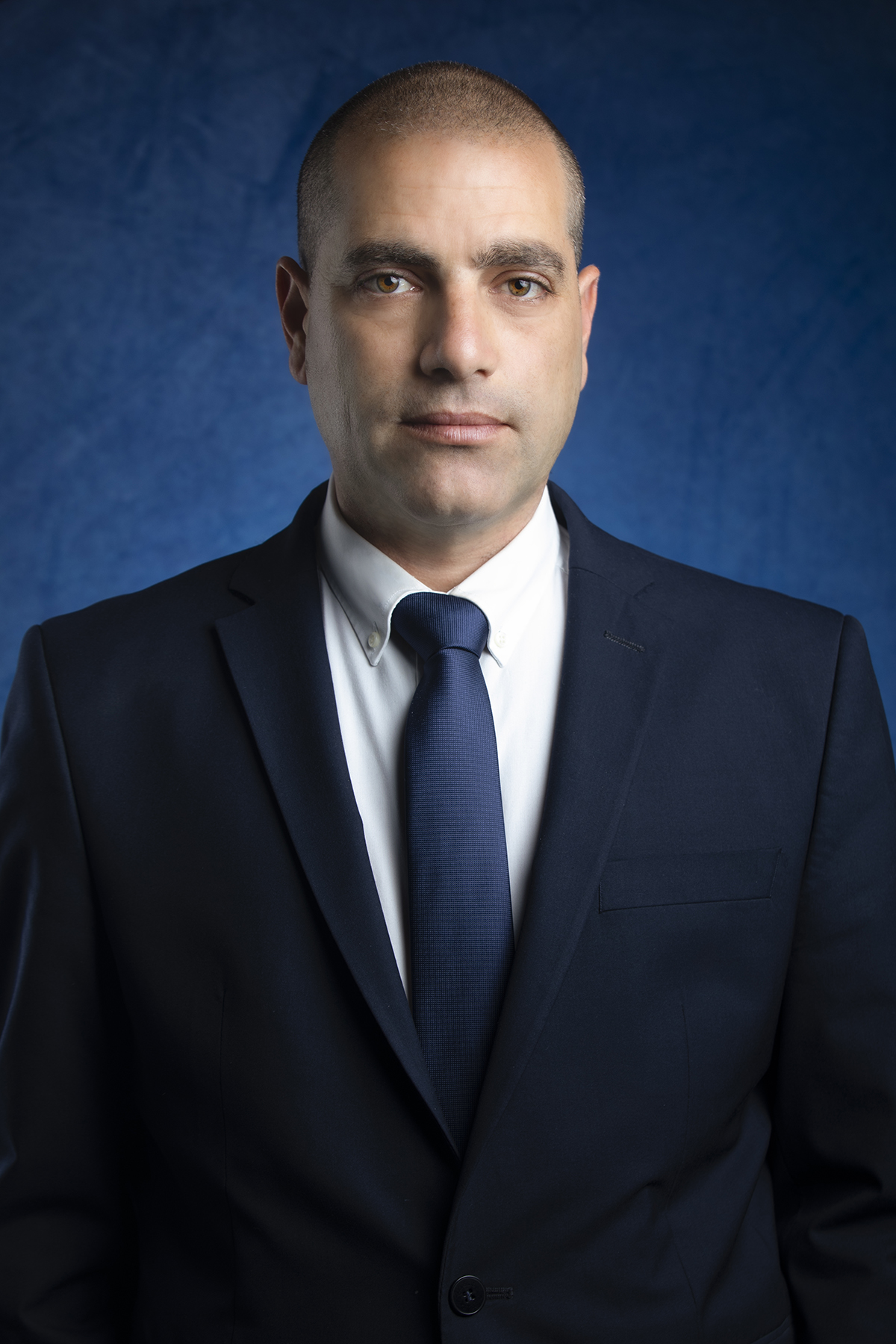
| | Majority party | Minority party |
|---|---|---|
| Candidate | Matan Kahana | Ofir Katz |
| Party | Yashar | Likud |
| Members' vote | 66 | 52 |
Speaker before election
Amir Ohana
Likud
Elected Speaker
Matan Kahana
Yashar

A vote to replace incumbent Knesset speaker Amir Ohana was requested by 67 MKs on 10 November and was scheduled for 17 November, after Yashar and its allies secured the necessary number of signatures for it. Matan Kahana, of Yashar, was elected as speaker by 66 votes, while his opponent, Ofir Katz of Likud, received 52 votes.
