= Shira Shapira =

Israeli architect, urban planner and politician

- שירה שפירא

Faction represented in the Knesset
- 2026–: Yashar

Personal details
- Born: Shira Ben-Menahem; 26 May 1975 (age 51) Israel
- Party: Yashar (since 2026)
- Other political affiliations: Zionist Home (2026)
- Spouse: Moshe Shapira
- Children: 8, including Aner
- Parents: Hanina Ben-Menahem (father); Yemima Ben-Menahem (mother)
- Relatives: Yosef Goldschmidt (grandfather); Elisabeth Goldschmidt (grandmother); Haim-Moshe Shapira (grandfather-in-law); Eliezer E. Goldschmidt (uncle)
- Occupation: Architect, urban planner, public official

Shira Shapira (Hebrew: שירה שפירא; born 1975), or Shira Shapiro, is an Israeli architect and urban planner. A former deputy director-general of the Ministry of Heritage, she oversaw heritage initiatives in the Tekuma region. She is a member of the 26th Knesset for the Yashar party.

== Career ==
Shapira trained as an architect and urban planner. After six years at the Israel Museum, she worked for the Israel Planning Administration, serving as head of the Sea and Coastal Areas Division.

In 2018, she joined the Ministry of Jerusalem and Heritage, where she served as deputy director of the Heritage Infrastructure Division. In 2024, she was appointed deputy director-general of the Ministry of Heritage, with responsibilities including the government program for documentation, heritage preservation and commemoration in the Tekuma region, an area affected by the 7 October attacks. She resigned from her position on 28 June 2026.

Shapira joined a new alliance that was formed in July between Yoaz Hendel's The Reservists and Blue and White Knesset member Chili Tropper.

She joined Yashar in September and was elected an MK for the party in the 2026 Israeli legislative election. After entering the 26th Knesset, she visited the "unity tent" to speak with Elisha Medan about forming a unity government.

== Personal life ==
Shapira was born in 1975 and is the daughter of Yemima Ben-Menahem, a recipient of the Israel Prize for research in philosophy, and Hanina Ben-Menahem, a professor of law at the Hebrew University of Jerusalem. Her grandparents were Yosef Goldschmidt, who served as Israel's deputy minister of the interior on behalf of the National Religious Party, and Elisabeth Goldschmidt, a scientist and pioneer of genetics in Israel.

In addition to her public activities, Shapira is involved in commemorating her son, Aner Shapira, who was killed during the 7 October attacks in 2023. She was among the founders of an organization established in his memory. During the attack, Aner was recorded throwing back grenades that militants had hurled into a roadside bomb shelter near Re'im, helping to save the lives of young people who had fled the Nova music festival. Footage showing him standing at the entrance to the shelter while others took cover behind him circulated widely and became one of the recognizable images of the attacks. In media interviews, Shapira has discussed her son's actions during the attack and his final moments.

She is married to Moshe Shapira, an architect and artist. He is a grandson of Haim-Moshe Shapira, who led the Hapoel HaMizrachi and Mizrachi movements, was a signatory of the Israeli Declaration of Independence, and served as a minister in several Israeli governments. The couple live in Jerusalem and have two sons and five daughters.
