= Alex Rif =

Israeli politician (born 1986)

- אלקס ריף

Faction represented in the Knesset
- 2026–: Yashar

Personal details
- Born: 8 February 1986 (age 40) Chernivtsi, Soviet Union
- Party: Yashar (since 2026)
- Education: Hebrew University
- Occupation: Poet; writer; activist; cultural-social entrepreneur
- Awards: Culture Minister's Prize (2018)

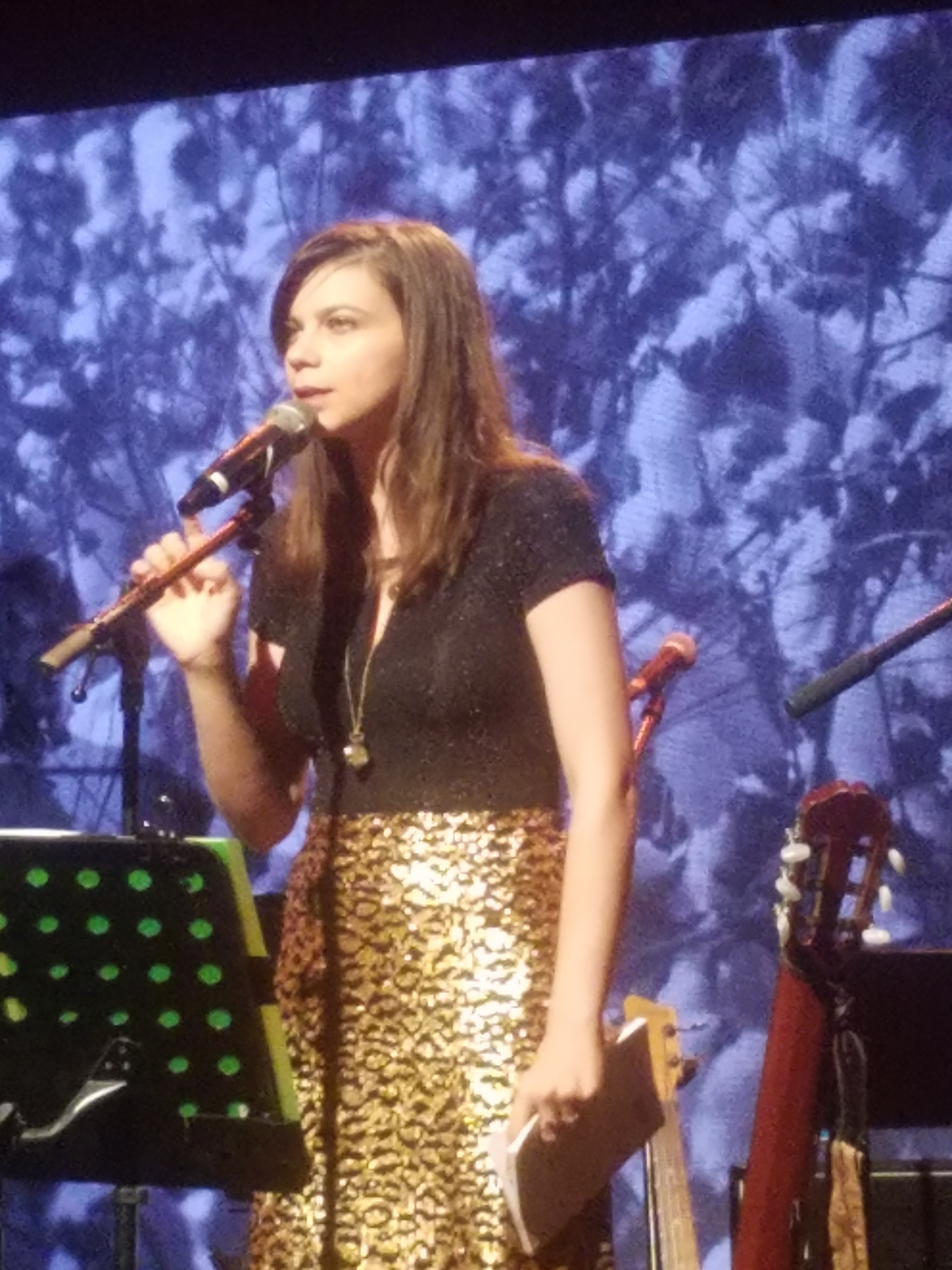
Alex Riff in 2019

Alex Rif (Hebrew: אלקס ריף; born 8 February 1986) is an Israeli politician and Member of Knesset for Yashar. Before being elected she was a social activist, poet, writer and cultural entrepreneur.

== Life ==
Rif was born on 8 February 1986 in Chernivtsi, then part of the Soviet Union (now Ukraine). In 1991, at the age of five, she immigrated to Israel with her family and grew up in Netanya. Her parents, both trained as engineers, took jobs outside their professions after immigrating, with her mother working as a cleaner and her father as an electrician.

Rif has described experiencing social pressure to assimilate into Israeli society during her childhood, distancing herself from her family's Russian language and Soviet cultural background. As an adult, she began exploring her family's immigration experiences and cultural heritage, which subsequently became central themes in her literary and social activism.

Rif attended Tchernichovsky High School in Netanya and participated in the Magen David Adom youth volunteer program. She was a participant in the Bronfman Fellowship and later served as an officer in the Israeli Military Intelligence Directorate.

She earned a bachelor's degree in political science and business administration and a master's degree in public policy from the Hebrew University of Jerusalem, studying through the Civil Service Cadet Program. Her master's thesis examined work–life balance among women holding senior positions in Israel's civil service. She subsequently worked at the Ministry of Economy, serving as a senior adviser to the Employment Commissioner on employment policies concerning underrepresented populations.

Rif also studied screenwriting at the Sam Spiegel Film and Television School and poetry at the Helicon literary program. She completed the Mandel Leadership Program in Jewish Culture and Program 120, a multicultural leadership initiative of the Shaharit Institute.

In 2018, she was named among the 20 most influential social activists in Israel by Lady Globes. In 2021, she was included in TheMarker magazine's list of 40 promising young leaders. In 2022, she received a special distinction in the Yossi Harel Prize for Aliyah and Integration.

Rif lives in Tel Aviv and has three children.

== Political career ==
In June 2026, Rif joined Yashar, the political party led by Gadi Eisenkot, and became responsible for developing its immigration and absorption policy. She was placed No. 15 on the slate and was the head of the party's olim integration program.

Rif was scheduled to be sworn in to the 26th Knesset as one of 47 first-time members.

== Projects ==
=== Generation 1.5 ===
In 2015, Rif became involved in Generation 1.5, a social movement established following the 2011 Israeli social justice protests. The movement brought together young Israelis who had immigrated from the Soviet Union and its successor states during the 1990s, seeking to address social and political issues affecting Russian-speaking Israelis, including employment, pensions, and religious conversion.

Within the movement, Rif helped develop its cultural and literary activities, focusing on the experiences of immigrants who arrived in Israel as children and grew up between Soviet and Israeli cultural traditions. Her work included organizing poetry readings, musical performances and cultural events that explored immigrant identity through Hebrew-language literature and other artistic forms.

In March and April 2015, Rif was among the organizers of a three-day festival of Russian-Soviet culture at the Tmol Shilshom café in Jerusalem. The event featured Hebrew-language poetry readings, Russian and Soviet music, and screenings of Soviet cinema. The cultural activities developed within Generation 1.5 subsequently formed the basis for the Cultural Brigade, which Rif co-founded later that year.

=== The Cultural Brigade ===
Rif is the CEO and co-founder of The Cultural Brigade. The Cultural Brigade is a grassroots social activist Generation 1.5 movement, working since 2015 to make immigrants from the former USSR feel accepted in Israel for their story and culture, through projects aimed to rebrand various cultural aspects, targeting critical cultural stakeholders and opinion shapers in the Israeli public.

Among the movement activities:

- "Israeli Novy God" a project focused on explaining the purpose of the Russian celebration of New Year's to Hebrew speakers. The project turned the holiday into an Israeli festival, breaking stereotypes about its connection to the Christian “Silvester” and encouraging Russian-speakers to host their Israeli born friends.
- "Operation Veteran" a project which sought public recognition of WW2 stories of Russian Jewish veterans through public campaign and meetings with veterans. The project led to the acknowledgment of 9 May as an official national day of commemoration by the Israeli Parliament in 2017.
- "Immigration Poetry" and "Tusovka" which allow poets and artists from the former Soviet Union to share their experiences of immigration and express their Russian-Israeli identity through the art.
- ^{“}Soviet City Themed Festivals”, Israeli artwork inspired by Jewish-Soviet history from Odesa and Saint-Petersburg inside of Israeli large museums and cultural institutions such as: Eretz Israel Museum Tel-Aviv, Beit Hatfutsot and more.
- “Circumcision Stories” a project in which Israeli men revealing their stories of going through circumcision as adults.
- “Evidence Season” a project which gives a voice to the injustice of 350K Russian-speakers who cannot get married in Israel for religious reasons.

=== One Million Lobby ===
In 2020, Rif co-founded the One Million Lobby, an Israeli non-profit advocacy group established to represent the interests of approximately 1.2 million Russian-speaking Israelis and their families. The organization emerged from the social activism of Generation 1.5 and focused on economic opportunities, civil rights, immigrant integration, religious affairs and cultural representation. Rif served as its chief executive officer until July 2026.

Under Rif's leadership, the lobby worked with government ministries and members of the Knesset to address barriers faced by immigrants from the former Soviet Union. Its initiatives included efforts to simplify the recognition of foreign professional qualifications, particularly for immigrant physicians, and to improve Hebrew language education for new immigrants. The organization participated in efforts to improve employment conditions for teachers in Hebrew-language ulpanim. In August 2023, an agreement was signed extending the Ofek Hadash employment framework to ulpan teachers.

The lobby also advocated for improved access to social services and public information in Russian. Working alongside politicians including Meirav Cohen and Vladimir Beliak, it supported the translation of the Israeli rights-information website Kol Zchut into Russian. The initiative received public funding, although its continuation faced budgetary difficulties. Rif also campaigned for improved financial support for elderly immigrants and Holocaust survivors from the former Soviet Union. In 2025 and 2026, she called for stronger government and law-enforcement measures against financial and telephone fraud targeting elderly Russian speakers.

In matters of religion and state, Rif advocated for changes to procedures concerning the verification of Jewish status, conversion, marriage and burial. She criticized the treatment of immigrants whose Jewish ancestry was not recognized under Jewish religious law and supported retaining the grandchild provision of the Law of Return, which grants immigration eligibility to certain descendants of Jews. The lobby also supported legislative initiatives concerning the burial of victims of terrorism who were not recognized as Jewish under religious law.

Another focus of the organization was the preservation and public recognition of Soviet Jewish history and heritage. Rif advocated for greater representation of Soviet Jewish history in Israeli educational and cultural institutions. On 27 May 2024, the Israeli government adopted Resolution 1785, authorizing the establishment of a cultural and educational heritage center dedicated to Soviet Jewry, its efforts to preserve Jewish identity and its struggle for immigration to Israel. The lobby was among the organizations promoting the initiative.

Rif stepped down as the organization's CEO in July 2026, before entering party politics.

== Works ==
In 2018, Pardes publishing (edited by Yael Globerman) published a book of Rif's first poems, Silly Girl of the Regime, which summarizes in fifty poems the immigration experiences of Russian immigrants in Israel. Rif's poetry emphasizes storytelling as a literary technique and tool to bring the experiences of Russian speakers in Israel to Hebrew-speaking Israelis.

For example, the poem "Evgeny" describes the bullying of Russian speakers that starts as early as the kindergarten. the poem "Recurring Dream" inscribes the experiences of Russian-speaking women who are reduced to sex work in order to make ends meet in Israel. Another poem, "Milah" revisits another painful memory in the immigration experience of Russian men - the adult circumcision.
