= Elyasaf Peretz =

Israeli social entrepreneur, educator and public activist

Faction represented in the Knesset
- 2026–: Yashar

Personal details
- Born: 27 December 1986 (age 39) Giv'at Ze'ev, Israel
- Parent: Miriam Peretz (mother)

Military service
- Allegiance: Israel
- Branch/service: Israel Defense Forces
- Rank: Major (reserves)
- Unit: Golani Brigade Reconnaissance Unit

Elyasaf Peretz (Hebrew: אליסף פרץ; born 27 December 1986) is an Israeli activist and politician currently serving as a member of the Knesset for Yashar. He is a co-founder and chairman of Our Brothers (HaAhim Shelanu), a nonprofit organization supporting bereaved siblings, and has served as director of the Society and Youth Division of the Jerusalem Municipality.

== Early life and military service ==
Peretz was born in Giv'at Ze'ev to Eliezer and Miriam Peretz, the fifth of their six children. In November 1998, when he was 12, his eldest brother, Lieutenant Uriel Peretz, a commander in the Golani Brigade Reconnaissance Unit, was killed by explosive devices planted by Hezbollah operatives in Southern Lebanon. His father died several years later. In March 2010, another brother, Eliraz Peretz, also a major in the Golani Brigade Reconnaissance Unit, was killed in combat in the Gaza Strip.

Like his brothers, Peretz enlisted in the Golani Brigade Reconnaissance Unit. He completed his mandatory military service in late 2009. During the Gaza war, he served as a reserve officer with the rank of major, completing more than 470 days of reserve duty.

== Educational and social activities ==
In 2011, Peretz established and headed a branch of the Shahar network of pre-military academies in Nitzan.

In 2017, together with Noy Yifrah, whose brother Tal was killed during Operation Protective Edge, and other bereaved siblings, he founded the nonprofit organization Our Brothers (HaAhim Shelanu). The organization works to promote public and legal recognition of bereaved siblings in Israel, organizes gatherings and provides support services. It also commemorates fallen soldiers through their siblings' personal stories, including at events held throughout Israel ahead of Yom HaZikaron, Israel's Memorial Day.

In 2023, Peretz and Yifrah received the audience favorite award in the Heroes of the Year project organized by Keshet 12 and Mifal HaPais.

In 2018, marking the 70th anniversary of the establishment of Israel, Peretz and Amichai Chikli, then head of the Tavor Academy for Zionist Leadership, initiated a seven-week walking journey. Participants walked simultaneously from Tel Hai in the north and Eilat in the south toward Jerusalem. The initiative involved dozens of social and educational organizations, pre-military academies, IDF units and thousands of citizens. The opening ceremonies were attended by Israeli President Reuven Rivlin.

Peretz also served as director of the Society and Youth Division of the Jerusalem Municipality.

== Political career ==
In 2026, Peretz joined the Yisodot Yisrael (Foundations of Israel) party founded by Hili Tropper, alongside Shira Shapira. In September 2026, Yesodot Yisrael formed a political alliance with Yashar, led by Gadi Eisenkot. Peretz was placed 20th on the party's electoral list and was elected to the 26th Knesset.

== Personal life ==
Peretz is married, has three children and lives in Jerusalem.
