= Hili Tropper =

Israeli politician

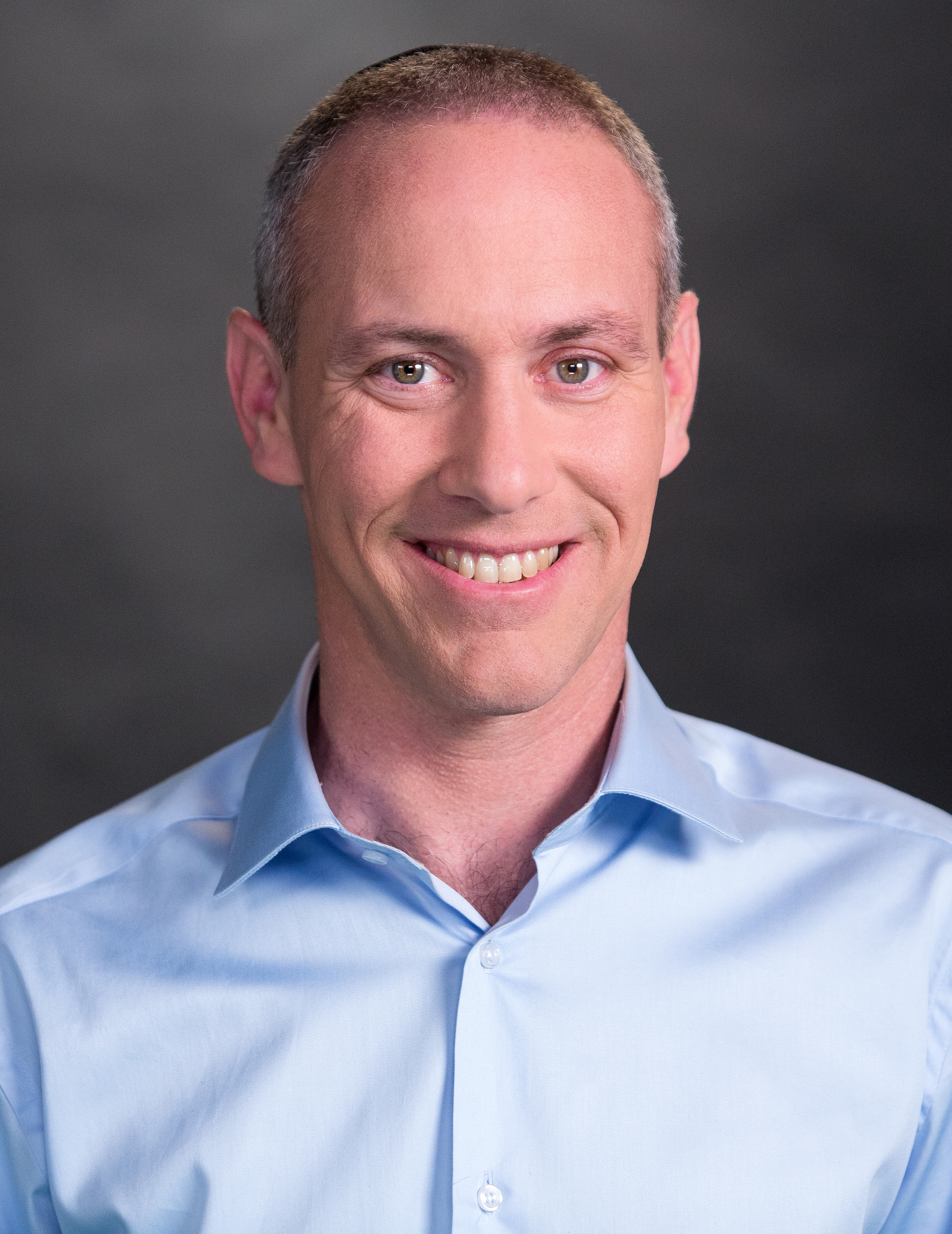
- Tropper in 2019

Ministerial roles
- 2020–2022: Minister of Culture and Sports
- 2023–2024: Minister without portfolio

Faction represented in the Knesset
- 2019–2020: Blue and White
- 2021: Blue and White
- 2022–2025: National Unity
- 2025–2026: Blue and White
- 2026–: Yashar

Personal details
- Born: 22 April 1978 (age 48) Jerusalem, Israel

Yehiel Moshe "Hili" Tropper (Hebrew: יְחִיאֵל מֹשֶׁה "חִילִי" טְרוֹפֵּר; born 22 April 1978), sometimes spelled Chili, is an Israeli politician, educator, and social worker. He is currently a member of the Knesset for Yashar and also served in the Knesset for Blue and White from 2019 until 2026. He held office as Minister of Culture and Sport from 2020 to 2022 and as a minister without portfolio in the emergency wartime cabinet from 2023 to 2024. Ahead of the 2026 Israeli elections, Tropper co-founded the Zionist Home – The Reservists list with Yoaz Hendel in July 2026 under the initial name Foundations of Israel; he withdrew from the alliance days before the closure of lists and joined Yashar.

== Biography ==
Tropper was born in Jerusalem in 1978, one of nine children of Faigie Tropper and Rabbi Daniel Tropper. He attended Horev yeshiva and during his national service in the Israel Defense Forces, was part of the Duvdevan Unit. He became a Social Worker and earned a BA in humanities from the Open University and an MA in Jewish history and education from the Lander Institute. He worked for the Bat Yam municipality and in 2007 worked at the Branco Weiss school in Ramle, where he was the principal for five years.

From 2013 to 2015 Tropper served as senior advisor to Minister of Education Shai Piron, and in 2015 he was appointed Director of Education, Culture and Welfare in the Yeruham Municipality.

Tropper is married to Tsofit Tropper, a nurse at Hadassah Medical Center. Together, they have four children and live in Nes Harim.

== Political career ==
Prior to the 2013 Knesset elections Tropper was placed twenty-third on the Labor Party list, but the party won only 15 seats. He was subsequently appointed as an advisor to Minister of Education Shai Piron. When Piron left the government in 2015, Tropper became Director of the Education, Welfare and Culture Division in Yeruham.

In the build-up to the April 2019 elections he joined the new Israel Resilience Party founded by his friend Benny Gantz. The party became part of Blue and White, with Tropper placed twelfth on the alliance's list. He was elected to the Knesset as Blue and White won 35 seats. He was re-elected in September 2019 and March 2020. In May 2020 he was appointed Minister of Culture and Sports in the thirty-fifth government of Israel. He subsequently resigned his Knesset seat under the Norwegian Law and was replaced by Yorai Lahav-Hertzanu. He was re-elected to the Knesset in the March 2021 elections. In May 2021 Tropper was additionally appointed Minister of Science and Technology, holding the portfolio alongside the culture and sports ministry until the swearing-in of the thirty-sixth government the following month. After being appointed Minister of Culture and Sports in the thirty-sixth government of Israel, he resigned from the Knesset under the Norwegian Law and was replaced by Mufid Mari. Tropper served until the inauguration of the thirty-seventh government of Israel on 29 December 2022, and returned to the Knesset as a member of the opposition National Unity.

On 12 October 2023 Tropper was sworn in as a minister without portfolio after his party joined the government following the outbreak of the Gaza war. Tropper resigned from the government in June 2024.

In May 2026 Tropper announced his departure from Blue and White and his intention to stand for re-election with a different party in the upcoming Knesset election. He collected signatures in June to begin forming a new party.

=== Zionist Home – The Reservists ===
On 6 July, Tropper filed a request with the Registrar of Parties at the Ministry of Justice to register a new party named "Foundations of Israel" (Hebrew: יסודות ישראל, romanized: Yesodot Yisrael). The following day, Tropper announced a joint run in the upcoming election with The Reservists, led by Yoaz Hendel. This alliance was eventually named "Zionist Home – The Reservists" (Hebrew: בית ציוני - המילואימניקים, romanized: Bayit Tzioni - HaMiluimnikim) later that month.

This party has been described as centre to center-right, with a target towards "liberal religious Zionists", reservists and voters on the right who were "disillusioned" with the Netanyahu government. The party's primary platform is to enforce Haredi conscription with the formation of a "broad unity government" without Haredi parties. If the formation of a broad government was not an option, they were also in favor of joining an opposition government with no Arab parties. Tropper initially had some disagreements with Hendel over denying voting rights to draft evaders, viewing it as an infringement on a basic democratic right, and the two later agreed to set the proposal aside.

Soon after the party's founding, Shira Shapira, mother of Aner Shapira, and Elyasaf Peretz, son of Israel Prize laureate Miriam Peretz, joined the new political initiative.

On 9 July, a poll from Israel Hayom projected the alliance crossing the electoral threshold for the first time with four seats, making the party potentially holding the balance of power if it successfully enters the Knesset.

By early September, Tropper was considering alternative options as the party again fell below the electoral threshold. He was reportedly considering joining Yashar, Together or Yisrael Beiteinu, with Yashar being the most likely option.

=== Yashar ===
On 6 September, the alliance dissolved with Tropper joining Yashar and placing in the sixth slot on the party's list. Other members of the alliance, including Shira Shapira, Elyasaf Peretz, and Shlomi Yechiav, also joined Yashar. With the alliance dissolved, Hendel then partnered with Yaron Zelikha's New Economic Party. Tropper was elected to the Knesset.

== Published works ==
- Makom BaOlam (A Place in the World), Yedioth Sfarim, 2013
- Shvil BaOlam (A Path in the World), Yedioth Sfarim, 2016
- Mered Shel Tikva (A Rebellion of Hope), with Yehuda Shohat, Yedioth Sfarim, 2018
