= Mishpat Ivri =

Aspects of halakha that are relevant to non-religious or secular law

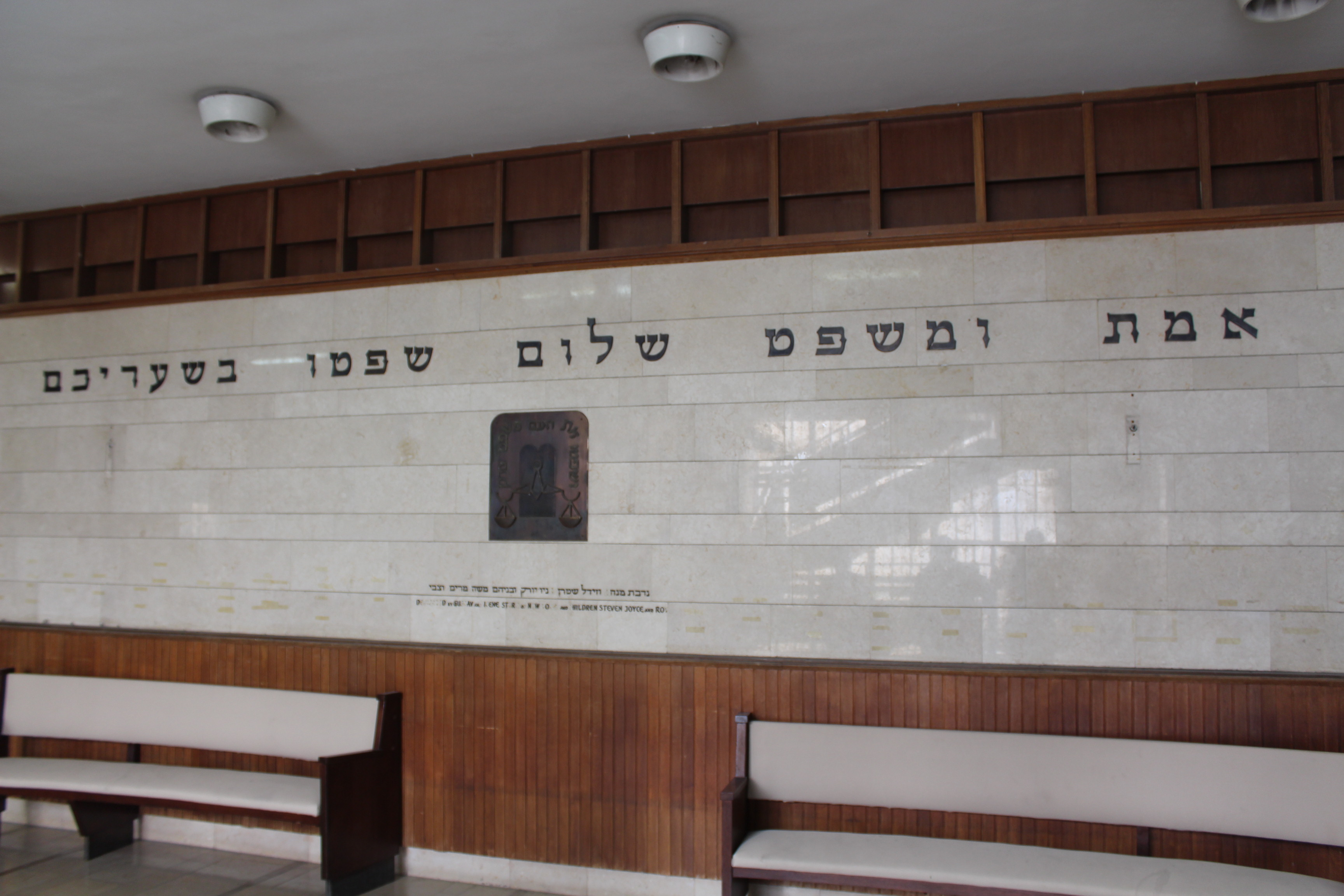
Heichal Shlomo Interiors, Jerusalem, Israel

Mishpat Ivri (Hebrew: משפט עברי, "Jewish/Hebrew law/jurisprudence") are the aspects of halakha ("traditional Jewish law") that are relevant to non-religious or secular law. In addition, the term refers to an academic approach to the Jewish legal tradition and a concomitant effort to apply that tradition to modern Israeli law.

== History ==
The idea of mishpat ivri as a western-style body of laws, distinct from the halakha which was deemed religious in nature, appeared in Mandate Palestine as a part of the zionist revivalist movement.

== Overview ==
The academic study of Mishpat Ivri spans the full geographic, literary, and historical range of halakha. It tends to exclude certain areas of halakha that are not comparable to modern civil law, such as criminal law and religious law.

Subjects covered in Mishpat Ivri include: property rights, torts (called damages in Jewish law), contracts, public law, international law, sales, renting, ownership, negligence, legal liability, and copyright.

Within classical rabbinic Judaism, all Mishpat Ivri subjects are also subsumed under halakha (Jewish law in general).

Scholars of Mishpat Ivri typically adopt methodologies based on legal positivism. Notably, Menachem Elon adopts a legal positivist approach in his extensive study (Elon 1994), which has been used to train Israeli law students at Hebrew University of Jerusalem. While useful for comparative law purposes, the legal positivist approach to Mishpat Ivri has been questioned by some scholars, such as Hanina Ben-Menahem and Bernard Jackson.

In the modern State of Israel, Mishpat Ivri has become one of the lesser ongoing sources for contemporary Israeli civil law, which developed along the model of British common law. (Israeli civil law was built primarily upon British and Ottoman law.) As an effort to promote Jewish law, the Mishpat Ivri movement has had relatively few gains, which include: (1) the Foundations of Law Act of 1980, allowing judicial reasoning to draw upon halakha, (2) the limited accretion of case law that refers to halakha, (3) occasional references to halakha in legislative deliberations, and (4) the placement of a Mishpat Ivri expert in the Attorney General's office, who has prepared bibliographies that document the references to halakha in Israel case law and legislation. The limited relevance of Mishpat Ivri to Israeli civil law may be contrasted with the dominant jurisdiction of rabbinic law courts in an Israeli marriage and divorce law.

== See also ==
- Courts in Israel
