= Israel Zari =

Israeli social activist and politician

- ישראל זרי
- Zari in 2026

Faction represented in the Knesset
- 2026–: Yashar

Other roles
- 2024–2026: Deputy Mayor of Ramat Gan

Personal details
- Born: 23 July 1990 (age 36) Bnei Brak, Israel
- Party: Yashar (since 2026)
- Other political affiliations: Independent (until 2024); Blue and White (2024–2026)
- Spouse: Niv Hollander (m. 2024)
- Alma mater: Reichman University

Israel Zari (Hebrew: ישראל זרי; born 23 July 1990) is an Israeli social activist and politician who serves as deputy mayor of Ramat Gan. He was elected to the 26th Knesset as a member of the Yashar! party.

== Early life and education ==
Zari was born in the Pardes Katz neighborhood of Bnei Brak and grew up in Ramat Gan. His father, Avraham, worked as an auto mechanic, and his mother, Drorit, as a medical secretary. He has an older sister, Gal. He attended Komemiyut Elementary School in Bnei Brak, later transferred to Yahalom School in Ramat Gan, and attended Ohel Shem High School. He was active in the Yarkon troop of the Israeli Scouts. After enlisting in the Israel Defense Forces, he continued to volunteer with the Scouts and helped establish the Alit troop in Ramat Gan. Following his military service, he returned to work as the coordinator of a large Scout troop in Givatayim.

In 2013, Zari began studying for a bachelor's degree in communication at the Interdisciplinary Center Herzliya (now Reichman University). He was elected a representative of his academic program and later became spokesperson for the university's student union. Following the outbreak of Operation Protective Edge at the end of his first academic year, he and other students established a civilian public-diplomacy operations center.

In his third year, he was admitted to the Argov Fellows Program in Leadership and Diplomacy, through which he participated in diplomatic visits to the European Union in Belgium and the United Nations in New York, among other destinations. He received dean's list honors throughout his studies, graduated with highest honors, and delivered the student address at his graduation ceremony. He later served as a personal adviser to minister Israel Katz, spokesperson for the Aguda – Israel's LGBT Task Force, spokesperson for the Hebrew Scouts Movement in Israel, and spokesperson for the Ra'anana municipality.

== Municipal political career ==
Ahead of the 2018 Israeli municipal elections, Zari founded Ramat Gani – The Young Men and Women, an independent, nonpartisan municipal list. The list endorsed Yisrael Zinger for mayor. It received more than 3,000 votes, and Zari, who headed the list, was elected to the 25-member city council. He became the council's youngest member and its first openly LGBT member. Following the election of Carmel Shama-Hacohen as mayor in the second round, Zari was assigned responsibility for youth affairs, the advancement of the city's LGBT community, and the Diamond Exchange District under the coalition agreement.

In the February 2024 municipal elections, Zari received the support of Benny Gantz and Blue and White, running on the Blue and White and the Young People led by Israel Zari list. The list won two seats. In April 2024, Zari was appointed deputy mayor of Ramat Gan, with responsibilities including infrastructure, management of the Diamond Exchange District, environmental quality and sustainability, youth affairs, and people with special needs.

=== Youth affairs ===
In his youth affairs portfolio, Zari worked to increase funding for youth movements and expand the range of youth organizations operating in the city, including the LGBT youth organization IGY and the Oz organization affiliated with Bnei Akiva. In September 2019, he promoted a reduction in membership fees across the city's youth movements, as part of the municipal Ramat Gan Plus initiative to encourage participation in extracurricular educational activities.

In June 2021, the city's first youth center, named Nehora in memory of Nehora Bar-Haim, opened at the Marom Naveh Center on Zari's initiative. He also supported construction of a new facility for the Yarden Scout troop.

In 2025, he promoted a municipal decision to subsidize 30% of the cost of summer camps organized by youth movements in Ramat Gan. The measure was intended to make the camps more affordable and reduce financial barriers to participation. According to the account in the original article, it resulted in the lowest youth camp prices in Israel.

In 2026, Zari led an initiative offering two-year academic scholarships to youth-movement and youth-organization coordinators who completed two years of work in the city. The program aimed to strengthen youth organizations by supporting both their participants and coordinators.

In January 2026, he also promoted a proposal to designate Tuesdays as Youth Movement Day in Ramat Gan, intended to encourage participation in informal education. The proposed changes included ending the school day by 2 p.m. on Tuesdays, avoiding competing municipal activities in the afternoon and evening, and minimizing Wednesday examinations wherever possible.

=== Diamond Exchange District ===
Zari promoted a plan to develop nightlife in Ramat Gan's Diamond Exchange District. Under the initiative, Schnitzer Square was developed as a central public square and hosted Israeli Independence Day celebrations and regular weekend events. Plans were also advanced to demolish existing Israel Diamond Exchange buildings and construct three office towers. A master plan for the district was approved in February 2022.

Further redevelopment of the district included improvements to public spaces and expansion of green areas, including additional shade trees. In May 2026, Wolt relocated its local headquarters to the district. Zari also participated in efforts to relocate Shenkar College of Engineering, Design and Art to the district as part of the planned Vertical City development in the Diamond Exchange Triangle, incorporating office towers, housing and educational facilities.

=== LGBT community affairs ===
During Zari's tenure overseeing LGBT community affairs, the municipal budget for related programs increased and a new departmental management position was established. He revived the municipal committee for promoting LGBT inclusion, which had been inactive for several years. In 2018, Ramat Gan held its first municipal Pride event, displayed Pride flags and painted benches and signposts in rainbow colors for Pride Month. Zari also worked to adapt municipal education forms to include same-sex families and LGBT parents.

In 2019, Zari and the mayor received recognition from the president of Israel following Ramat Gan's fourth-place ranking in the Aguda – Israel's LGBT Task Force index of municipalities' LGBT inclusiveness. Ramat Gan rose to third place in 2022 and second place in 2023.

In September 2022, Zari inaugurated Ramat Gan's first LGBT community center, with spaces for activities and regular community programming. On Family Day in 2023, five same-sex couples from the city held wedding ceremonies and received municipal partnership certificates intended to provide them with municipal rights and benefits equivalent to those of married couples. Zari sought to expand LGBT-related training across the city's schools. In 2023, Ramat Gan received an award from the organizations Hoshen and IGY for incorporating their training sessions and workshops into the municipal education system.

=== Environmental affairs ===
As the municipal official responsible for environmental quality and sustainability, Zari promoted initiatives addressing noise pollution, green spaces, waste reduction and reuse.

In 2024, he advanced an amendment to the municipal noise bylaw to strengthen enforcement and increase fines for inappropriate vehicle-horn use, loud music and construction work during prohibited hours. He also promoted the installation of cameras designed to detect and document excessive road noise. Preparations included selecting technology, identifying noise hotspots, legal and operational planning, and training municipal inspectors. Installation was expected in 2027.

Zari also participated in efforts to establish a therapeutic forest in the Ramat Efal neighborhood, near a municipal community foraging area. The initiative draws on forest bathing practices, involving guided activities in natural surroundings intended to promote physical and mental well-being.

Other projects he supported included community sharing centers and cabinets through which residents could donate or take usable clothing, toys, books and household goods. These included a sharing center at Blich High School in Ramat Hen, another in Marom Naveh, and a sharing cabinet in the Rishonim neighborhood.

He subsequently participated in establishing the Otsarot Center on Mendes Street, a secondhand initiative based on circular economy principles. Furniture, household goods and other items are collected, sorted, cleaned and offered at affordable prices. Revenue is directed toward supporting local social-welfare families and people affected by the war, who may receive household furniture and equipment free of charge or at nominal cost.

== National political career ==
Ahead of the 2026 election to the 26th Knesset, Zari announced that he was joining Gadi Eisenkot's Yashar! party. He was placed 18th on the party list and was elected to the Knesset.

== Personal life ==
In October 2024, Zari married his partner, Niv Hollander, in a traditional Jewish wedding ceremony officiated by Rabbi Rafael Yonatan Polisuk.
