= Yashar (political party) =

Israeli political party

Yashar! with Eisenkot: ישר! עם איזנקוט; يشار! مع أيزنقوط
- Abbreviation: Yashar!
- Leader: Gadi Eisenkot
- Founder: Gadi Eisenkot
- Founded: 16 September 2025
- Split from: National Unity
- Headquarters: Morasha Interchange, Ramat HaSharon
- Ideology: Zionism; Liberalism; Liberal Zionism
- Political position: Centre to centre-right
- Colours: Light blue; Blue
- Knesset: 21 / 120

Election symbol
- דרך; درخ

Website
- yasharwitheisenkot.com

Yashar (Hebrew: יָשָׁר, lit. 'straight'), stylized as Yashar! with Eisenkot (יָשָׁר! עִם אַיְזֶנְקוֹט), is a centrist political party in Israel led by Gadi Eisenkot. The party was founded in September 2025 by Eisenkot, former Chief of Staff of the Israel Defense Forces and member of Knesset with National Unity. Emerging as a major challenger to Prime Minister Benjamin Netanyahu's Likud, the party had risen in opinion polls, positioning Eisenkot as a leading contender for the premiership.

The party contested the 2026 Israeli legislative election on 27 October and won 21 seats.

== Background and founding ==
In June 2025, Gadi Eisenkot announced his intention to resign from National Unity and the Knesset. He criticized the party as being dominated by leader Benny Gantz. Eisenkot officially established Yashar in September 2025 to "repair, heal, and give hope" while prioritizing "security and national interests above all." He expressed openness to merging with other factions to maintain Israel as "a Jewish, democratic and strong state".

According to MK Matan Kahana, who also joined the party, the party's name, meaning straight, honest, or truthful, was inspired by an interview with former Gaza War hostage Eli Sharabi, who remarked that securing the return of captives was "not about right or left, but straight". The party's formation was welcomed by opposition leaders Yair Lapid of Yesh Atid and Yair Golan of The Democrats.

== 2026 election campaign ==
Eisenkot, who is viewed as the most likely candidate to replace Benjamin Netanyahu as prime minister, outlined three conditions in July 2026 for building a governing coalition with other parties, namely to "recognize Israel as a Jewish and democratic state, endorse the values of the Declaration of Independence and commit to all Israelis performing national service".

Eisenkot has made preparations to form a minority government after the election. On 14 August, Haaretz published an article reporting that he was willing to form a minority government if Zionist opposition parties fail to achieve the 61 seats needed for a Knesset majority. In response, Yisrael Beiteinu leader Avigdor Lieberman rejected this idea, stating that his party will not be part of a minority government.

Eisenkot has made outreach to Shas supporters, including asking Shas member Tzuriel Krispel to join the Yashar slate, though he declined. Shas expressed concern that Eisenkot has the potential to attract its traditional Sephardi voters towards Yashar.

The party won 21 seats.

== Leadership and prominent members ==
Yashar was launched with a core group of founding figures from civic, security, and political backgrounds, including Shir Siegel (daughter of former Gaza hostages Keith and Aviva Siegel), former Netanyahu chief of staff Yoav Horowitz, and former MKs Matan Kahana (National Unity), Tal Russo, and Manuel Trajtenberg (Labor). Other founding members include Inbar Harush Gity, Nir Zohar of Wix, former general Yishai Beer, and film producer Yariv Mozer.

Ahead of the 2026 election, the party expanded its roster with several high-profile additions, with various politicians, including former MK Orit Farkash-Hacohen (Blue and White), and Ramat Gan Deputy Mayor Israel Zari. The list also includes government officials, such as former Ministry of Finance budget chief Shaul Meridor and former Welfare Ministry chief of staff Inbar Yehezkeli Blilious. Others include those in the security sector, such as former Shin Bet chief Yoram Cohen and former COGAT chief Kamil Abu Rokon. Former Yesh Atid MK Elazar Stern and former Kulanu MK Roy Folkman joined the political party on 24 August.

Adi Altschuler joined the party in early September and was designated the party's education minister if it comes to power.

Shirel Hogeg, the CEO of AM:PM, was added to the slate on 10 August. Hogeg subsequently decided against becoming a candidate on the party's list.

== Knesset members ==
Knesset	Members	Seats
26th (2026–present)	Gadi Eisenkot, Yoram Cohen, Orit Farkash-Hacohen, Adi Altschuler, Matan Kahana, Hili Tropper, Shaul Meridor, Tair Ifergan, Oshrat Gani Gonen, Shira Shapira, Inbar Harush Gity, Elazar Stern, Kamil Abu Rokon, Deborah Sharifian Bachar, Alex Rif, Inbar Yehezkeli Blilious, Roy Folkman, Israel Zari, Tal Ohana, Elyasaf Peretz, Yaffa Tebeje	21 / 120

== Platform ==
Yashar's party platform has 10 steps for working towards Israel's prosperity, listed in the party website as follows:

1. State commission for 7 October – an inquiry to investigate the October 7 attacks and assist in the rehabilitation of victims
2. National security – establish a systemic national strategy for Israeli security through strengthening the IDF, fortifying borders, and expanding the circle of peace, to ensure a Jewish majority
3. Military service – Integration of Haredi and Arab Israelis into Israeli military service, to ensure an equality in burden
4. Education – establish a core education curriculum for all Israelis in the spirit of the Declaration of Independence, and also to decentralize powers and improve technological studies
5. Law enforcement – restore security on Israel's streets by tackling crime, especially in Arab communities
6. Cost of living – integrate all of Israeli society into the labor and service markets, provide state incentives for those who bear security and economic burden, along with public investment into transportation, education, health care, and the periphery
7. Democracy and public service – protect minority rights, human rights, and the rule of law, maintain legislative and judicial independence, enact term limits for prime minister, and keep public service professional, for the benefit of Israeli citizens
8. Social polarization – reduce social polarization to renew public trust, preserve Israel as a Jewish and democratic state, promote inclusive and respectful Judaism, so that all citizens can maintain their faith and lifestyle, expand independence of local authorities, provide a high quality of life through improved transportation, health, education, and cultural services
9. Jewish immigration – prevent brain drain by strengthening aliyah, with the goal of 1 million immigrants in 10 years, and another million by 2048
10. Centennial of State of Israel – establish a strong planning authority that will make Israel a prosperous model state based on partnership, brotherhood, and mutual responsibility by the country's centennial in 2048

Party leader Gadi Eisenkot has also committed to preserve and protect Israel's Law of Return, including its Grandchild Clause, which allows anyone with a single Jewish grandparent to immigrate to Israel and to seek an Israeli safe haven from anti-Semitism abroad.

== Election results ==
=== Knesset ===
Election	Leader	Votes	%	Seats	+/−	Government
2026	Gadi Eisenkot	913,629	16.05 (#2)	21 / 120	New	TBA
