= Tal Ohana =

Israeli politician

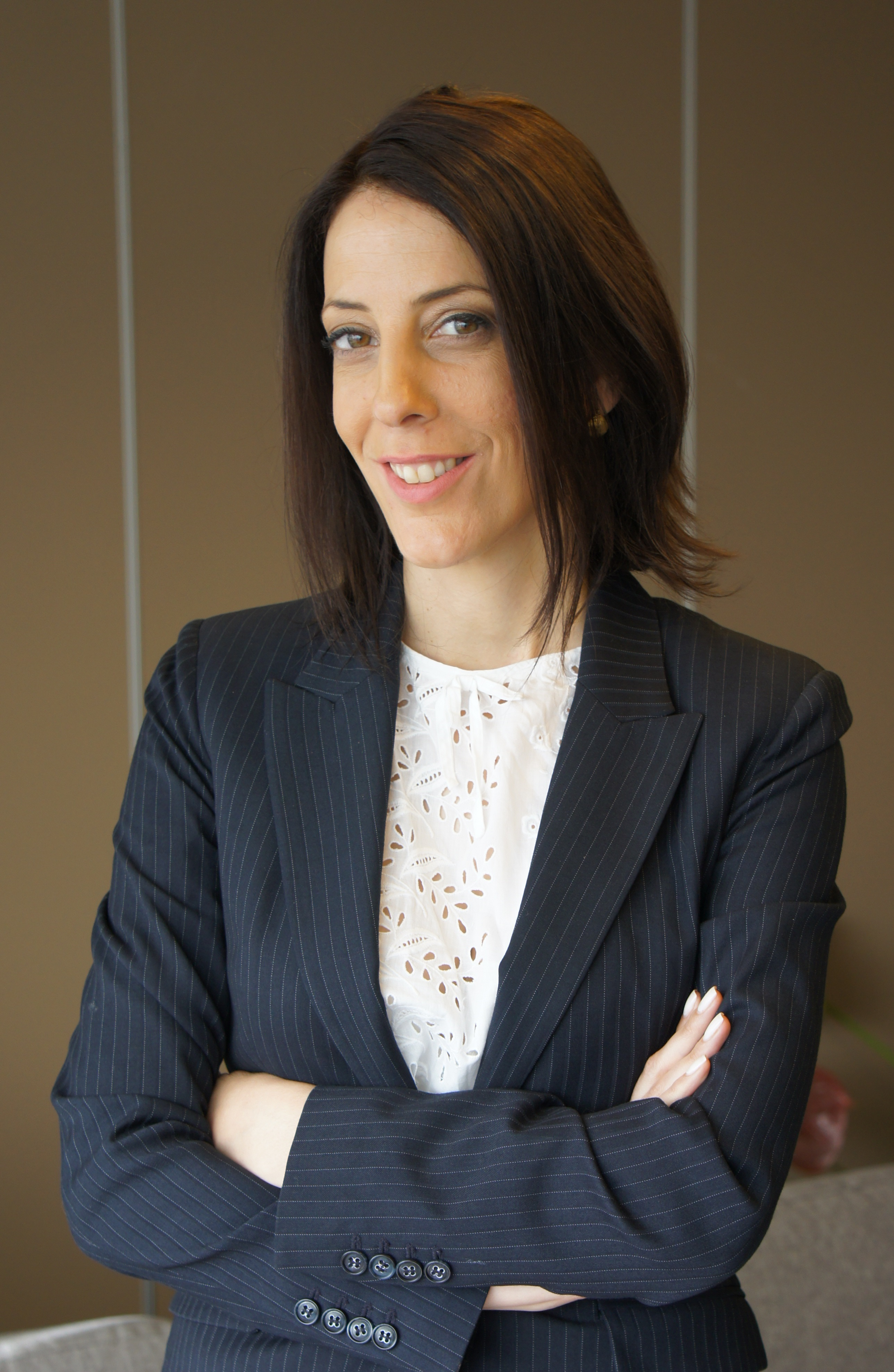
- Ohana in 2018

Faction represented in the Knesset
- 2026–: Yashar

Personal details
- Born: 17 March 1984 (age 42)

Tal Ohana Hakmon (Hebrew: טל אוחנה; born 17 March 1984) is an Israeli politician and member of the Knesset for Yashar. Ohana previously served as the mayor of Yeruham from 2018 to 2024.

== Biography ==
Tal Ohana was elected mayor of Yeruham in 2018. She is the first woman to serve in this position in the town's history. Ohana lost re-election to Nili Aharon.

In August 2026, Ohana joined Yashar and was assigned the 19th slot on the party's electoral list for that year's election. She was elected to the 26th Knesset as the party won 21 seats.
