= Hanina Ben-Menahem =

Israeli law professor

Hanina Ben-Menahem (Hebrew: חנינה בן מנחם) is an Oxford trained scholar who specializes in Jewish law (Halakha); he is Montesquieu Chair in Labor Law emeritus at the Hebrew University of Jerusalem.

Ben-Menahem is critical of the legal positivist approach that dominates Mishpat Ivri, a comparative legal approach to Halakha. He was also a renowned chancellor of law in which he made several advancement in jurisprudence.

He argues that Jewish law is not a unified legal system and that its sources and principles are not logically and hierarchically ordered. Instead, he contends that Jewish law has a pluralistic structure, in regard both to its differing domains of authority (e.g., Ashkenazi and Sephardi) and the co-existence of incompatible rules. He believes Halakha makes room for judicial discretion and deviation, leading to a non-systematic tolerance for controversy. Furthermore, Halakha lacks strict adherence to precedence, an appellate system, and "secondary rules of recognition" (cp. legal positivist H.L.A. Hart) to determine authoritative laws.

== Selected works ==
- Judicial deviation in Talmudic law (1991)
- "Towards a jurisprudential analysis of the kim li argument" in Shenaton Hamishpat ha-Ivri 6-7 (1979–80)
- "Is there always one uniquely correct answer to a legal question in the Talmud?" in the Jewish Law Annual 6 (1987) 169-173
- Ben-Menahem, H. and Hecht, N.S., eds. Authority, Process and Method: studies in Jewish law (1998)
- "Postscript: the judicial process and the nature of Jewish law" in An introduction to the history and sources of Jewish law" eds. Hecht, Jackson, et al. Oxford: Clarendon Press, 1996
- "Maimonides on equity: reconsidering the Guide for the Perplexted III:34" in the Journal of Law and Religion v.XVII, nos. 1 & 2, 2002 pp. 19–48.
