= Yaffa Tebeje =

Israeli politician

- יפה טבג'ה

Faction represented in the Knesset
- 2026–: Yashar

Personal details
- Born: 25 August 1989 (age 37) Karmiel, Israel
- Education: Ashkelon Academic College

Yaffa Tebeje (sometimes spelled Yaffa Tabaja) (born 25 August 1989) is an Israeli social activist and politician serving as a member of the Knesset for Yashar since 2026.

== Biography ==
Tebeje was born in Karmiel, and had seven siblings. Her parents, Zertihun and Gimsa Tebeje, had made Aliyah to Israel from Ethiopia five years prior during Operation Moses. The family later moved to Yavne. Tebeje served through Sherut Leumi, and then acquired bachelors' degrees in Criminology and Government and a Masters' degree in Communications from Ashkelon Academic College. During her studies, Tebeje also served as the head of the Colleges' students union, and as its representatives on the national student unions' managing board.

She began her public activity as a coordinator of community clubs in Ashkelon at the Ministry of Welfare.

In 2022, Tebeje was active in the periphery movement, and participated in a march calling for greater funding of peripheral education, welfare and health.

In 2023, Tebeje established an innovation centre in Ashkelon on behalf of the municipal government. At the time, she also participated in the leadership of several forums aiming to reduce social inequality, fight poverty promote Ethiopian-Israeli students.

In 2026, she announced her intention to stand for election in that year's Knesset election as a member of Yashar. She was assigned the 21st slot on the party's electoral list and was elected as the party won 21 seats.

== Personal life ==
Tebeje is single, Masorti, and alternates her residence between Yavne and Ashkelon.
