= Oshrat Gani Gonen =

- אושרת גני גונן

Faction represented in the Knesset
- 2026–: Yashar

Other roles
- 2018–2026: Head of the Drom HaSharon Regional Council

Personal details
- Born: 20 January 1971 (age 55) Neve Yamin, Israel
- Education: Beit Berl College (B.ED), Tel Aviv University (MA)

Oshrat Gani Gonen (born 20 January 1971) is an Israeli politician and a member of the Knesset for Yashar. Gonen is currently serving as head of the Drom HaSharon Regional Council.

== Biography ==
Oshrat Gani Gonen was born in 1971 in Moshav Neve Yamin to Holocaust survivors who made Aliyah from Greece, and helped found the Moshav in 1949. Gonen's father, Shabtai, served as the Moshav's Chairman. During her mandatory IDF service, Gonen served as an Education Officer. Gonen completed Informal education at Beit Berl College and is qualified as an education counselor by Tel Aviv University.

In 1993, Gonen became the Youth and Community Coordinator at Drom HaSharon Regional Council, and in 1997 entered the Kfar Saba Municipal Government, where she served in several roles related to Youth and the Community, and later became the head of the Human Resources Department.

In 2013, Gonen was elected to the Drom HaSharon regional council as a representative of Neve Yamin.

In 2015, she was appointed Director of the City of Kfar Saba. In January 2018, Gonen resigned as Director to seek election as head of Drom HaSharon Regional Council. She won the election, held later that year, with 77.8% of the vote, becoming the first woman to hold the role. Gonen was re-elected in 2024 with 93% of the vote.

On 29 July 2026, Gonen announced her intention to stand for election in that year's Knesset election as a member of Yashar. She was assigned the 9th slot on the party's electoral list and was elected as the party won 21 seats.

== Personal life ==
Gonen is married to Dror Gonen, CEO of Galilee Software. The couple has four children and resides in Neve Yamin.
