= Hanamel Dorfman =

Israeli politician

Faction represented in the Knesset
- 2026–: Otzma Yehudit

Personal details
- Born: 1995

Hanamel Dorfman, also spelled Chanamel, is an Israeli politician and a member of the Knesset for Otzma Yehudit.

== Biography ==
Dorfman, who was born in 1995, has been involved in the Hilltop Youth movement, who are "ultra-nationalist" ... "settlers", since his teenage years and is married to the daughter of Bentzi Gopstein, the head of Lehava, an "anti-miscegenation" group. A report in late November 2022 indicated that Otzma Yehudit head Itamar Ben-Gvir would select Dorfman as his chief of staff.

He resigned from the position in July 2026 and was placed seventh on the party's list ahead of the 2026 Israeli legislative election. He was elected after the party won seven seats. He stated in an interview with i24News that he shaved off his payot because he no longer identified as a Hilltop Youth.

== Legal issues ==
He had administrative orders against him in the West Bank as a minor. He was arrested in 2012 and 2013 and sued each time, winning both cases (with Ben-Gvir as his lawyer).
