= Shai Piron =

Israeli Orthodox rabbi, educator and politician

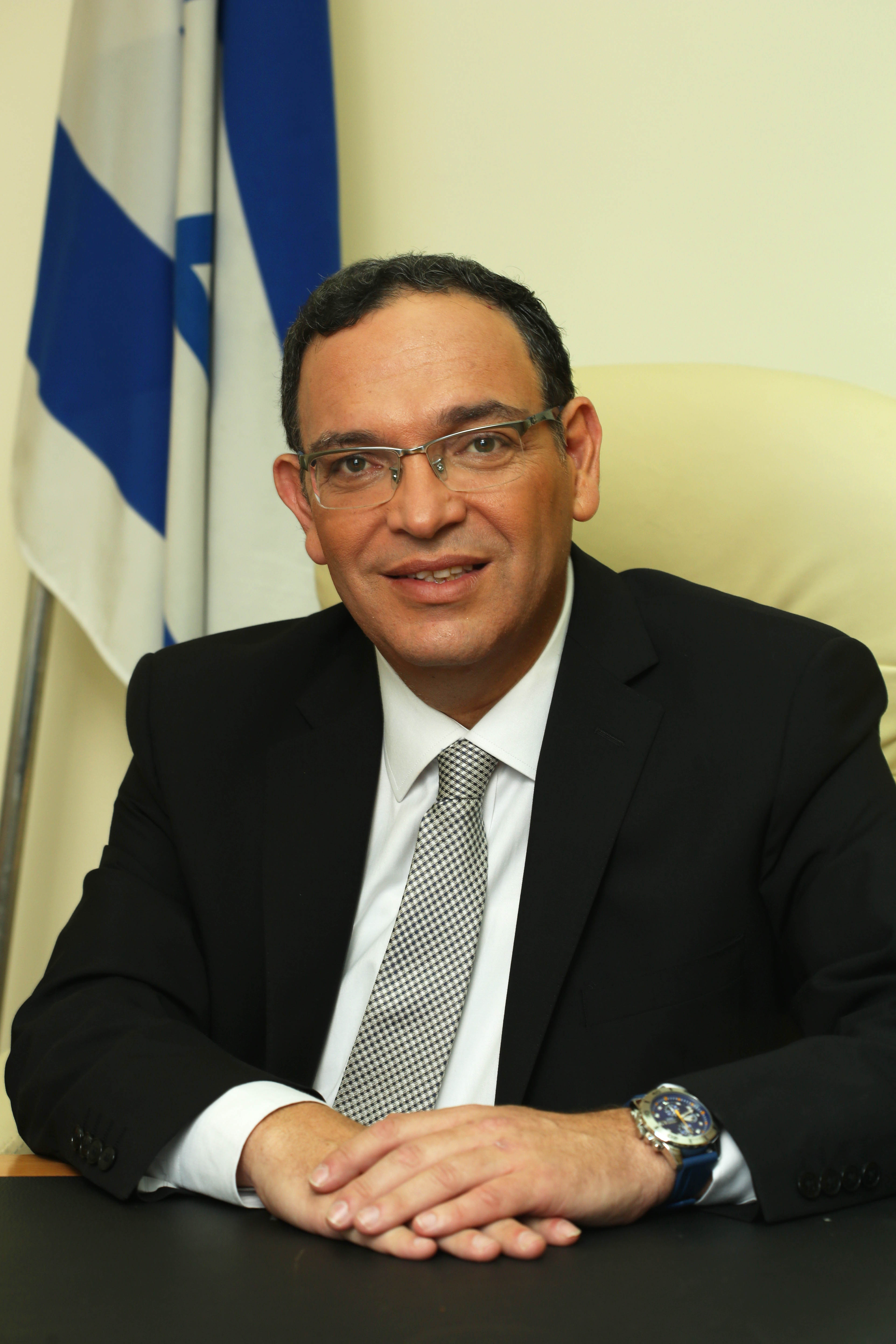
- Piron in 2014

Ministerial roles
- 2013–2014: Minister of Education

Faction represented in the Knesset
- 2013–2015: Yesh Atid

Personal details
- Born: 25 January 1965 (age 61) Kfar Vitkin, Israel

Shai Moshe Piron (Hebrew: שי משה פירון; born 25 January 1965) is an Israeli Orthodox rabbi, educator, and politician. A religious Zionist, he served as a member of the Knesset for Yesh Atid between 2013 and 2015, and as Minister of Education between 2013 and 2014.

== Biography ==
Born in Kfar Vitkin, Piron was ordained as a rabbi, and co-headed the hesder yeshiva in Petah Tikva. Piron is the CEO of "Hakol L'Chinuch", which works to improve state education. He helped found Tzohar, and runs numerous projects to foster harmony between religious and secular Israelis.

In 2012 he joined the newly formed Yesh Atid party, and was placed second in its list for the 2013 Knesset elections. With the party winning 19 seats, he became a member of the Knesset. Yesh Atid joined the coalition, and Piron was appointed as Minister of Education replacing Gideon Sa’ar.

In March 2015 Piron called for Israel to have all schools include the "Nakba" in their curriculum: "I'm for teaching the Nakba to all students in Israel. I do not think that a student can go through the Israeli educational system, while 20% of students have an ethos, a story, and he does not know that story." He added that covering the topic in schools could address some of the racial tensions that exist in Israeli society. Piron's comments broke a taboo in the traditional Israeli narrative, and conflicts with efforts on the part of some Israeli lawmakers to defund schools that mark the "Nakba".

He was placed second on the party's list again for the 2015 elections, and was re-elected as the party won 11 seats. Following the elections, he was appointed Deputy Speaker of the Knesset.

In September 2015 Piron resigned from the Knesset and accepted a teaching position at a college in Sderot. He was replaced by Elazar Stern, twelfth on the Yesh Atid list.

Piron lives in the Israeli settlement of Oranit in the West Bank. He is married and has six children.
