= Elazar Stern =

Israeli politician

- אֶלְעָזָר שְׁטֵרְן
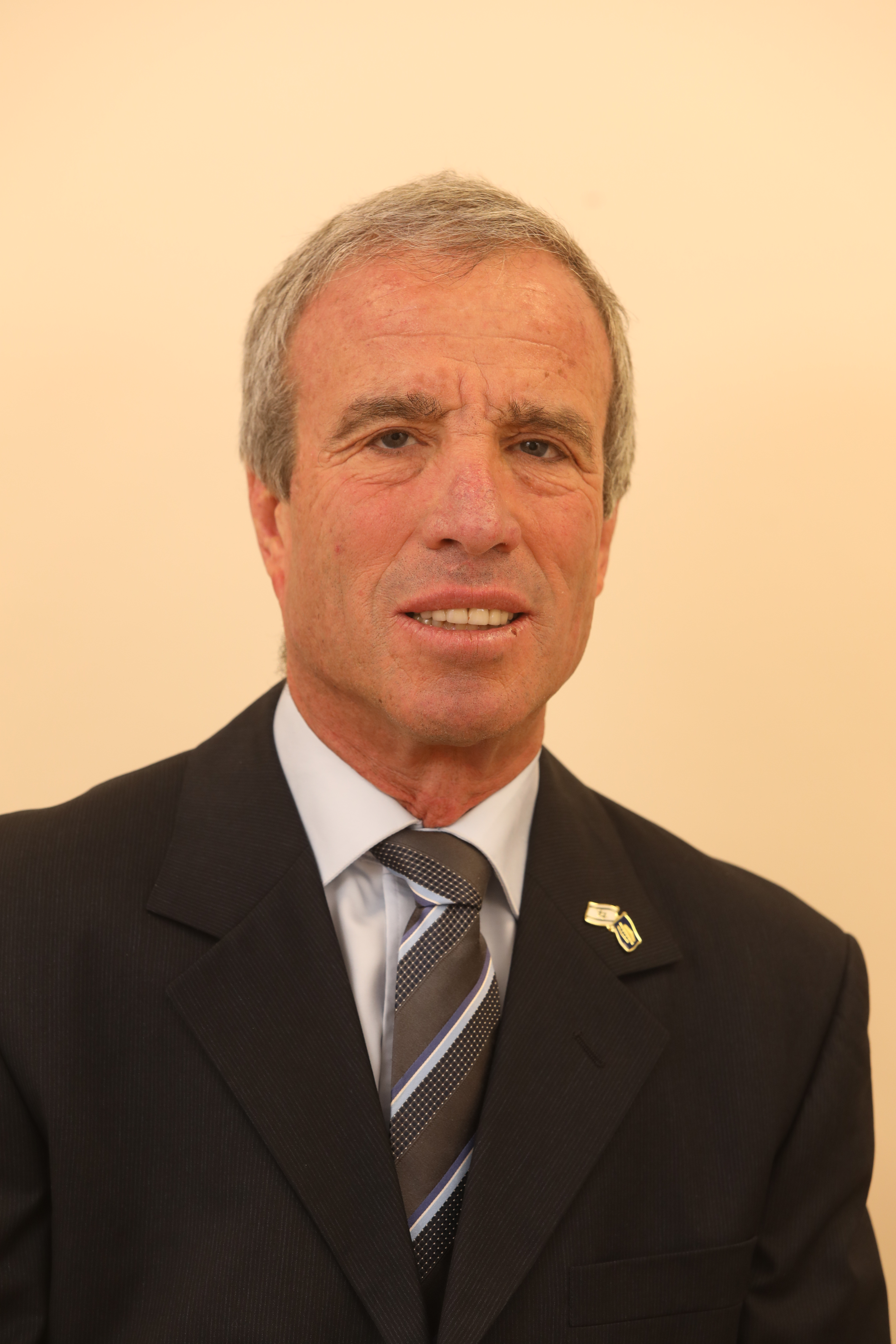
- Official portrait, 2019

Ministerial roles
- 2021–2022: Minister of Intelligence

Faction represented in the Knesset
- 2013–2015: Hatnua
- 2015–2019: Yesh Atid
- 2019–2020: Blue and White
- 2020–2026: Yesh Atid
- 2026–: Yashar

Personal details
- Born: 25 August 1956 (age 70) Tel Aviv, Israel
- Party: Yashar (since 2026)
- Other political affiliations: Hatnua (2012–2015); Yesh Atid (2015–2026)
- Spouse: Dorit Stern
- Children: 5
- Education: Bar-Ilan University; Tel Aviv University; Northwestern University; National Defense University
- Military career
- Allegiance: Israel
- Branch: Human Resources Directorate
- Service years: 1974–2008
- Rank: Aluf (Major General)
- Commands: 226th Brigade; Bahad 1; Education and Youth Corps
- Conflicts: First Lebanon War; South Lebanon conflict; Second Intifada; Second Lebanon War

Elazar Stern (Hebrew: אֶלְעָזָר שְׁטֵרְן; born 25 August 1956) is an Israeli politician who serves as a member of the Knesset for Yashar. He was a major general (res.) in the Israel Defense Forces, serving as Head of the Personnel Directorate, commander of the IDF Officers Training School, and Chief Education Officer, as well as a combat soldier and commander in the Paratroopers Brigade. He served as a Member of Knesset (MK) for the Hatnua party from 2013 until 2015, and became an MK for Yesh Atid in 2015, serving until 2026. He also served as the Minister of Intelligence between 2021 and 2022.

== Early life and family ==
Stern was born in 1956 in Tel Aviv to Sara and Levi, both Holocaust survivors. He and his wife Dorit have five children and fourteen grandchildren. They live in Mitzpe Hoshaya, a community settlement in the Galilee he helped to found.

== Education ==
Stern holds a bachelor's degree in Land of Israel studies and economics from Bar-Ilan University, an Executive Master of Business Administration (EMBA) from the Kellogg-Recanati International program of Tel Aviv and Northwestern Universities, and a master's degree in Strategic Resource Management from the National Defense University in Washington, D.C.

== Military service ==
Stern was drafted In 1974, serving with the Paratroopers Brigade, where he held a series of command positions, including battalion commander. In 1976, he became an infantry officer after completing Officer Candidate School and returned to the Paratroopers Brigade as a platoon leader. Stern took part in raids against PLO camps in Lebanon, and served as a Company commander in the 890 "Efe" (Echis) paratroop company. Stern fought in the 1982 Lebanon War, and later on commanded Paratroopers Brigade's training base and the 202 paratroop battalion in South Lebanon. During his career, Stern commanded a reserve Paratroopers Brigade and the IDF's Officer Candidate School (Bahad 1). Afterwards, he served as the chief of the IDF's Education and Youth Corps and succeeded Gil Regev as head of the Manpower Directorate (a name he changed to Human Resources) in July 2004. In 1987, after leaving the army, he became a teacher to gifted high school students in Nof HaGalil. Several years later, Stern re-enlisted in the IDF for career service and continued to fill command positions in the field units; deputy commander of a territorial brigade on the northern border, brigade commander, commander of the IDF Officers Training School (Bahad 1), and commander of an armored division (reserves).

As head of the Human Resources Directorate from 2004-2008, Stern led efforts to promote Jewish and democratic education. He initiated and established the Nativ conversion project, through which more than 12,000 people mainly from the former Soviet Union converted. He promoted the absorption of immigrants in the IDF, strengthened IDF ties with Diaspora Jewry and established the Machtzavim program for the development of Jewish and democratic educational leadership skills among senior IDF officers. He also led a project to introduce bone marrow transplant match testing to the IDF enlistment procedure, saving thousands of lives, including Jews from the Diaspora. Stern formulated and oversaw the Edim b’Madim (Witnesses in Uniform) project which sends IDF soldiers to Poland to witness the concentration camps firsthand. Tens of thousands of officers have participated including army veterans and bereaved families. He also headed a special committee that reformulated the IDF Code of Ethics and led the writing of the “Ya’ud VeYachud” covenant, which strengthens Jewish and Zionist valuues. Stern oversaw a program to convert non-Jewish IDF soldiers to Judaism. He has also led the integration of hesder units into mainstream units.

Stern retired as the head of the Human Resources Directorate in July 2008, and was replaced by Avi Zamir.

== Public service ==
=== Parliament and government roles ===
Prior to the 2013 Knesset elections, Stern joined the new Hatnuah party, and was placed fourth on its list. He was elected to the Knesset after the party won six seats, but announced on 20 December 2014 that he had left the party.

In the build-up to the 2015 elections, he joined Yesh Atid, and was placed twelfth on its list. With the party winning only 11 seats, he lost his seat. However, he re-entered the Knesset on 4 September 2015 after Shai Piron resigned his seat.

Stern has served as an MK since the Nineteenth Knesset and has been a member of the Constitution, Law and Justice Committee; the Finance Committee; and the Foreign Affairs and Defense Committee. He spearheaded parliamentary efforts to address issues of religion and state in the Knesset. Among other bills Stern was involved in passing, he sponsored the Conversion Law (Temporary Order); the Shabbat and Jewish Holidays Law; and the Authorization to Provide Supervision and Regulation over Kashrut Services Law. He chaired the Religion and State Caucus, the Caucus for Ethiopian Immigrant Soldiers, and the Parliamentary Caucus for Holocaust Survivors, through which he fought to expand the resources provided to Holocaust survivors in Israel. He also chaired the Caucus for the Promotion of Israeli Music.

Stern pushed for the reform of the conversion system in Israel, supporting tribunals headed by city rabbis. He was a member of the Committee for Equal Sharing of the Burden along with the Yesh Atid parliamentary group, in which he fought to extend the military service of soldiers from Hesder Yeshivas.

In the Twentieth Knesset, he and MK Avi Dichter (then the Chairman of the Foreign Affairs and Defense Committee) sponsored the law to freeze funds that the Palestinian Authority received from the Government of Israel and used in conjunction with terrorism.

In June 2021, Stern was appointed Minister of Intelligence in the new government. In 2023, Stern said he would run for the office of mayor of Haifa on behalf of the Yesh Atid party but withdrew his candidacy in May.

He stated in May 2026 that he might leave the party ahead of the 2026 Israeli legislative election and join Gadi Eisenkot's party Yashar if Together, an alliance of Yesh Atid and Naftali Bennett's Bennett 2026 party, did not merge with it. Stern announced in mid-August that he would not run with Yesh Atid and was considering joining Yashar. Stern announced that same month that he was officially joining Eisenkot's slate.

He resigned from Yesh Atid in September 2026 and was replaced by Roni Malkai.

== Controversies ==
In 2008, he stopped teenage rock star Shira Gavrielov from performing at a military farewell party on the grounds that she had not served in the military.

While Stern was serving as a minister in 2021, he was accused of having suppressed anonymous sexual harassment complaints as head of the Manpower Directorate. In his view, "people who have something to say about others should speak openly." The remarks were condemned by women's groups. One former soldier claimed that he had threatened her to withdraw allegations against a non-commissioned officer and would make her time in the army "dark and bitter" if she continued. Stern denied having said that. Another woman who had served as an officer in charge of sexual harassment complaints said that Stern had ignored complaints about a male officer who had tried to kiss her against her will. He dismissed it as "nonsense" but said that he would look into it. Stern's office subsequently claimed that the offending officer was relocated and his service was shortened.

Due to the public controversy this generated, Stern withdrew his candidacy for head of the Jewish Agency.

== Other activities ==
On 14 October 2005, Stern and his family were assaulted in Jerusalem while praying at the Western Wall in protest of his role in expelling Jews from the Gaza Strip during the disengagement plan.

In 2009, Stern published a book later translated into English as Struggling over Israel’s Soul: An IDF General Speaks of His Controversial Moral Decisions. From 2010 until his entry into the Knesset in 2012, Stern served as the volunteer chairman of the Foundation for the Benefit of Holocaust Victims in Israel, chaired the Ethiopian National Project from 2012, and was a member of the board of directors of the Habima Theatre.
