= Deborah Sharifian Bachar =

Israeli educator and politician

- Sharifian Bachar in 2026

Faction represented in the Knesset
- 2026–: Yashar

Personal details
- Born: 1 April 1982 (age 44) Tehran, Iran

Deborah Sharifian Bachar (Hebrew: דבורה שריפיאן בכר; born 1 April 1982) is an Israeli educator and politician and a member of the Knesset for Yashar. Sharifian previously served as an analyst at Mossad and Shin Bet.

== Early life ==
Deborah was born Naznine Sharifian in Tehran in 1982, to Fari and Houchang Sharifian, the latter being a textile merchant. When she was seven, her family was smuggled to Israel by Mossad, and settled in Beersheba, Her parents renamed her Deborah, after the biblical prophetess.

Bachar has a bachelors' degree in Criminology and Political science from Bar-Ilan University, a masters' degree in instruction and formal qualification from the Ministry of Education to teach civics and Persian.

== Career ==
=== Military service and career ===
Deborah enlisted in the IDF at the age of 18 against the wishes of her socially conservative family. She initially underwent flight training at the Israeli Air Force Flight Academy, but later dropped out to became a drill instructor. After her dischargment, she became a member of a Shin Bet Tequila Team for 4 years. She then left for Mossad, where she became a Big Data and Iran analyst. She retired from Mossad after almost 20 years, at the age of 39.

=== Military education ===
After her retirement, Bachar's family moved from Herzliya to Kibbutz Eilot after her husband accepted an offer to run a children's clinic in Eilat. Devorah, with support from the IDF's Atidim scholarship program, established an Iran and Intelligence selective course at the city's Rabin high school, in which she taught Persian and strategic thinking. The program won an award from the head of the Military Intelligence Directorate in 2026.

=== Entry into politics ===
In July 2026, Bachar joined the political party Yashar and was assigned the 14th slot on the party's electoral list for that year's Knesset election. She has focused on her platform on education reform by improving funding and human capital in addition to strengthening Arabic language education. She has also touted her Iranian background as an important asset in confronting against the Islamic Republic and its regional proxies.

She was elected as the party won 21 seats.

== Personal life ==
Bachar is married to pediatrician Maor Bachar, the couple has three children.
