= Lander Institute =

Jewish private institution of higher education

Coordinates: 31.7893°N 35.1863°E

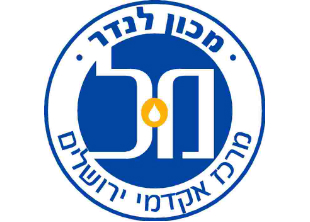
- Lander Institute Logo
- Type: Private
- Active: 2004–2014
- Affiliation: Jewish
- Students: 2000+
- Undergraduates: 1000
- Postgraduates: 1000
- Location: Jerusalem, Israel
- Campus: Multiple campuses
- Colors: Blue and White

Lander Institute (Hebrew: מכון לנדר) was a private Jewish institution of higher education located in the Givat Shaul neighborhood of Jerusalem, Israel. Established in August 2004, it was named after Professor Bernard Lander, the founder of Touro College in New York. The institute operated until its closure in 2014.

== History ==
Initially functioning as an extension of Touro College, Lander Institute provided American degrees in Israel. In 2006, it attained recognition from the Council for Higher Education in Israel, allowing it to operate as an independent institution and award Israeli degrees.

== Campus and programs ==
The institute featured separate campuses catering to both secular and Orthodox populations and included an Advanced Enhancement Department in English, which provided professional development courses in various fields.

== Academic profile ==
Lander Institute offered several academic programs through its different schools, including:

- School of Business Administration
- School of the Land of Israel and Jerusalem
- School of Education and Social Studies
- School of Jewish Studies
- External studies unit
- English Division

The institution was authorized to grant recognized degrees such as:

- Bachelor's degree (B.A) in Business Administration
- Master's degree (M.A) in Jewish Studies
- Bachelor's degrees in the Study of "The Land of Israel and Jerusalem" and Education and Society
- Master’s degree in Business Administration (MBA)
