= Roy Folkman =

Israeli politician (born 1975)

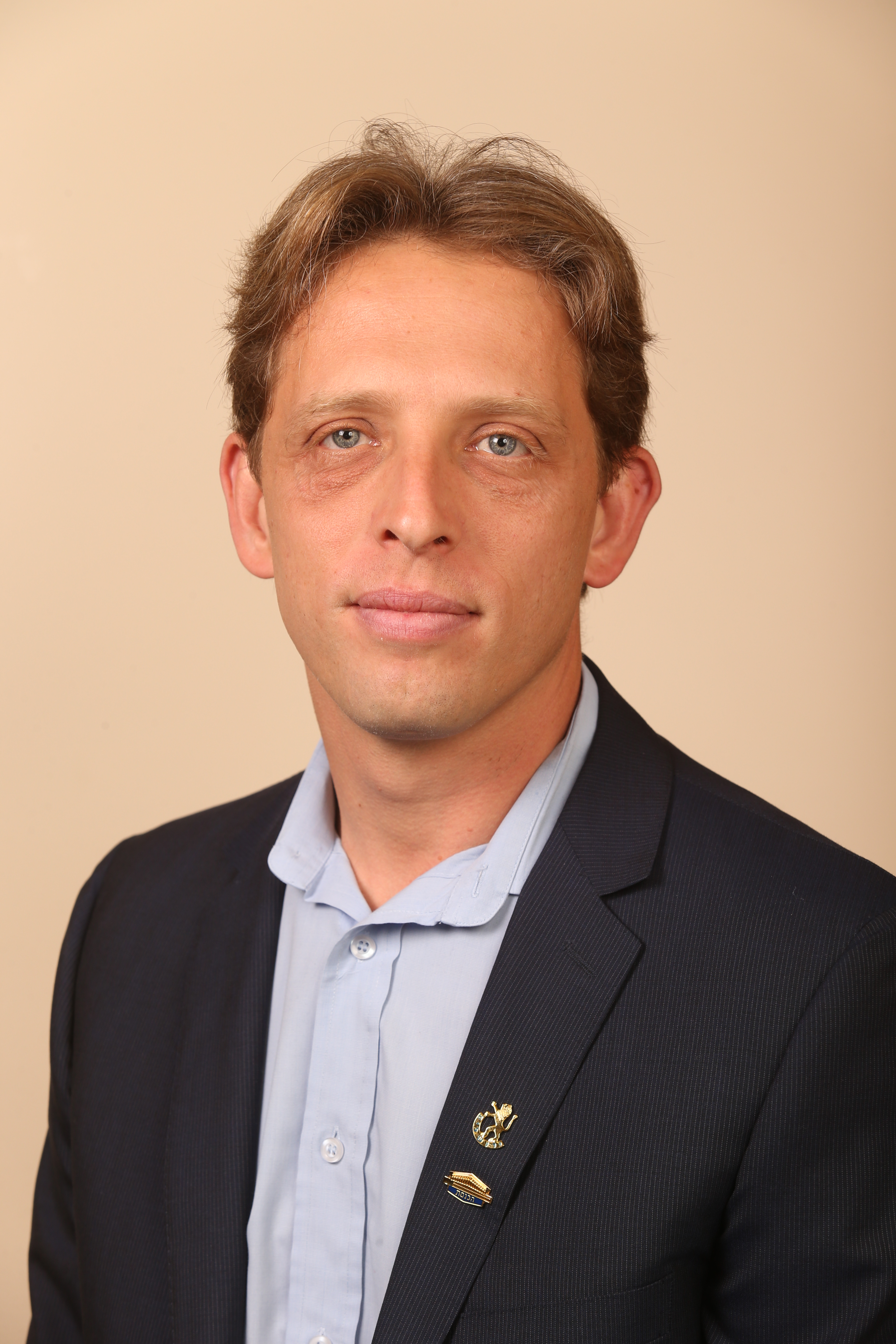
- Folkman in 2015

Faction represented in the Knesset
- 2015–2019: Kulanu
- 2026–: Yashar

Personal details
- Born: 5 August 1975 (age 51) Tel Aviv, Israel

Roy Shmuel Folkman (Hebrew: רוֹעִי פוֹלְקְמָן; born 5 August 1975) is an Israeli politician. He has served in the Knesset as a member of Yashar since 2026 and was previously a member of the Knesset for Kulanu between 2015 and 2019.

== Biography ==
During his IDF military service Folkman served as a combat medic. After leaving the army, he was involved in the Society for the Protection of Nature in Israel, and studied for a BA in economics, Islam and Middle Eastern studies at the Hebrew University of Jerusalem, where he was leader of the student union. He later gained a master's degree in public policy, studying at the Kennedy School of Government at Harvard University.

Between 2008 and 2012 he worked as an advisor to the Mayor of Jerusalem Nir Barkat. In the 2013 municipal elections he was placed sixth on Barkat's list for the City Council elections, but failed to win a seat.

Prior to the 2015 Knesset elections he joined the new Kulanu party, and was placed ninth on its list. He was elected to the Knesset as the party won ten seats. He was fourth on the Kulanu list for the April 2019 elections, and was re-elected as the party won four seats. However, when Kulanu merged into Likud prior to the September 2019 elections, Folkman did not join Likud, and subsequently lost his seat.

Folkman joined Gadi Eisenkot's Yashar party in August 2026, ahead of the 2026 Israeli legislative election. Folkman won a seat in the election. Eisenkot appointed Folkman the head of the party's parliamentary bloc in late October, after the election. Folkman was appointed the head of the Arrangements Committee in November 2026.

Folkman lives in the moshav of Nes Harim, and is married with four children.
