= Tair Ifergan =

Director General of the Israeli Ministry of Labor (born 1979)

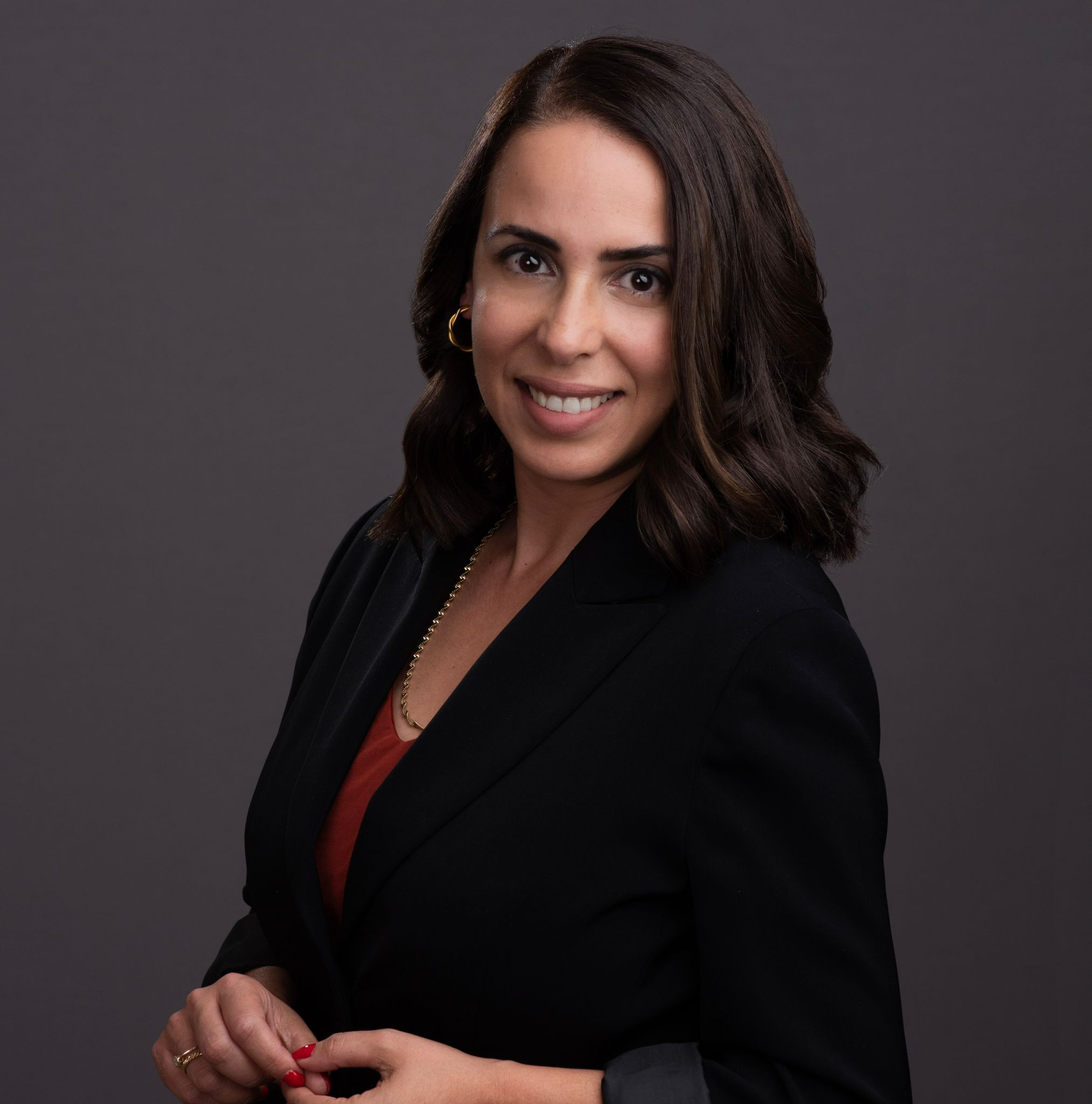
- Ifergan in 2021

Faction represented in the Knesset
- 2026–: Yashar

Other roles
- 2021–2023: Director-General of the Ministry of Labour

Personal details
- Born: 5 October 1979 (age 47) Ramla, Israel

Tair "Revivo" Ifergan (born 5 October 1979) is a member of the Knesset for Yashar since 2026. She served as acting Director-General of Israel's Ministry of Labor and also served as Director-General of the Labor Administration.

== Biography ==
Ifergan was born and raised in Ramla, Israel. During her military service, she served as a commander of a recruits' training company. In 2006, she completed a bachelor's degree in political science and international relations at the Hebrew University of Jerusalem, and in 2010 she completed a master's degree in public policy at Tel Aviv University.

She began her career in the public sector as a graduate of the "Atidim for the Public Sector" program (later known as "Cadets for State Service") and during her studies interned in 2004 at the Prime Minister's Office, with the Prime Minister's economic advisor. In 2005 she interned at the Ministry of Defense, in the Political-Security Division, performing strategic analyses and assisting with foreign security relations.

After completing her bachelor's degree, she managed projects at the headquarters for the development of the Negev and Galilee, and afterward, from 2009 to 2016, served as head of the Director-General's staff at the Ministry of Economy and Industry.

In 2014, she served as acting Deputy Director-General for administration and human resources at the Ministry of Economy and Industry.

In 2016, she began managing the Governmental Institute for Technological Education at the Ministry of Labor, Social Affairs and Social Services, and joined as a fellow and network member in the "Maoz Fellows" program.

In 2021, the Minister of Labor and Welfare, Yitzhak (Itzik) Shmuli, appointed her as acting head of the Labor Administration (Zroa HaAvoda), and in early 2022, she was appointed Director-General of the Labor Administration, after the Minister of Economy and Industry, Orna Barbivai, accepted the recommendation of the search committee on the matter.

Ifergan served as a board member of various organizations such as the Council for the Advancement of Women in Science and Technology, the Council of Certified Engineers and Technicians, the Institute for Occupational Safety and Hygiene, and others.

She was chosen by TheMarker as one of the 100 most influential people in Israel for 2021, and in 2023 as one of Globes' 50 most influential women.

In 2023, she concluded her role as Director-General of the Ministry of Labor.

In June 2026, she joined the Yashar political party and was elected in the 2026 Israeli legislative election.

== Personal life ==
Ifergan is married to attorney Yehuda Ifergan and is the mother of three daughters. She resides in Mazkeret Batya.
