= Inbar Harush Gity =

Israeli activist and politician

- ענבר הרוש גיטי
- Harush Gity in 2026

Faction represented in the Knesset
- 2026–: Yashar

Other roles
- 2020–2022: Coordinator of the Haredi draft program of the Ministry of Defense

Personal details
- Born: 9 July 1982 Jerusalem, Israel
- Party: Yashar (since 2025)
- Other political affiliations: National Unity (2022–2025)
- Children: 4
- Education: Hebrew University of Jerusalem
- Occupation: Civil servant, activist, politician

Inbar Harush Gity (Hebrew: ענבר הרוש גיטי, born 9 July 1982) is an Israeli activist and politician.

== Early life ==
During Harush Gity's mandatory service in the IDF, she served as an instructor in the Education and Youth Corps, working with at-risk youth. After her service, she joined Acharai!, a nonprofit that provides social and pre-army programs for at-risk and special needs youths. She later became the organization's CEO.

Gity graduated from the Hebrew University of Jerusalem with a bachelor's in psychology and biology and a master's in public policy.

== Political career ==
Gity worked to create special programs for Haredi conscripts. She originally worked in an organization named Pnima, then between 2020 and 2022 coordinated the Haredi draft program in the defense ministry under Benny Gantz. During her work in the defense ministry, she created the Kodkod program conscripting Haredi men into Unit 8200.

In August 2022, Harush Gity joined the National Unity alliance, led by Gantz and Gadi Eisenkot. She was assigned the 18th slot on the party's electoral list, but did not become a member of the Knesset as the party won only 12 seats.

On 1 July 2025, Harush Gity joined Eisenkot in leaving National Unity, and later joined his new Yashar party ahead of the 2026 election.

In March 2026, Gity identified Haredi conscription as a "top priority" but that it must be "addressed holistically, alongside education, employment and economic integration". She also spoke about the importance of public education reform to improve in core subjects of Hebrew, English, and Math while incentivizing Haredi schools to meet national standards.

On 30 June 2026, Gity participated in Yashar's campaign launch, where she presented the party's national service law aimed at conscripting the Haredim.

In August 2026, there were reports that Gity had been in contact with Haredi Public alongside Ronen Manelis and Ronen Aviani for potential cooperation, with Haredi Public denying the allegation as "inaccurate".

She was elected to the Knesset.

== Personal life ==
Harush Gity is a resident of Shoham. She is married and has four children.
