= Inbar Yehezkeli Blilious =

Israeli lawyer and social-sector executive

- Yehezkeli Blilious in 2026

Faction represented in the Knesset
- 2026–: Yashar

Personal details
- Born: 26 June 1977 (age 49) Jerusalem

Inbar Yehezkeli Blilious (Hebrew: ענבר יחזקאלי בליליוס; born 26 June 1977) is an Israeli lawyer, social-sector executive and member of the Knesset for Yashar. She has served as an adviser on social policy to Israel's ministers of finance and welfare.

== Early life ==
Inbar Yehezkeli Blilious was born in Jerusalem in 1977. During her military service, she worked as a reporter and producer for Bamahane, the Israel Defense Forces magazine. Following her discharge in 1997, she worked for four years as a researcher for Channel 1 and subsequently spent a year as a culture correspondent for Reshet Bet.

While working in broadcasting, she pursued a bachelor's degree in law, specializing in human rights, at the Academic Center for Law and Science. She completed her legal internship at the Jerusalem District Attorney's Office, working in both its criminal and civil divisions, and later earned a master's degree in law from the Hebrew University of Jerusalem.

== Career ==
Beginning in 2004, Yehezkeli Blilious volunteered in the educational department of the Jerusalem Rape Crisis Center. From 2007 to 2008, she worked as an attorney at Bizchut, the Israel Human Rights Center for People with Disabilities. In this capacity, she participated in legal proceedings and legislative initiatives promoting the rights of people with disabilities. These included petitions to the Supreme Court of Israel sitting as the High Court of Justice concerning the integration of children with disabilities into mainstream education, the implementation of the Community Rehabilitation of Persons with Mental Disabilities Law, and the submission of amicus curiae briefs concerning the employment of people with disabilities.

In 2008, she joined the Association of Rape Crisis Centers in Israel as legal adviser and head of its legal department. In 2010, she was appointed director of the Jerusalem Rape Crisis Center. From 2010 to 2015, she also served on the board of the International Center for Health, Law and Ethics at the University of Haifa.

Alongside her professional positions, Yehezkeli Blilious served on the boards of several public and nonprofit organizations. These included the Suzanne Dellal Centre for Dance and Theatre (from 2016), the Friends of Firqat Alnoor, an orchestra promoting classical Arabic music in Israel (from 2017), the Movement for Public Journalism (2018–2019), and a vocational rehabilitation college for women affected by prostitution and violence (2018–2020).

From 2023 to 2024, she served as co-director of the Democratic Institute, an Israeli educational and social organization.

=== Politics ===
Between 2011 and 2014, Yehezkeli Blilious served as an adviser to the ministers of welfare and social services, first Moshe Kahlon and subsequently Meir Cohen. During this period, she participated in the development of several social policies. She was a member of the committee examining the Ministry of Welfare's policies regarding the removal of children from their families and placement in out-of-home care. She also chaired a roundtable established by the ministers of finance and welfare to formulate policies concerning Holocaust survivors, and served on a committee addressing the integration of older adults into employment and community life.

From 2015 to 2018, she again advised Kahlon, this time during his tenure as minister of finance. She was involved in shaping social policy, particularly regarding women, Arab citizens of Israel and people with disabilities. During this period, she initiated the establishment of a committee to examine disability benefits and the employment of people with disabilities. She also served on the interministerial task force established to combat racism against Israelis of Ethiopian descent.

In 2019, she managed Yedid, a nonprofit organization, under a court appointment. In 2020, she returned to the Ministry of Welfare as chief of staff to Minister Itzik Shmuli.

In the 2022 election, Yehezkeli Blilious was placed 17th on the electoral list of the National Unity alliance, but did not enter the Knesset as the party only won eight seats. In April 2026, Yehezkeli joined the Yashar party ahead of the 2026 election, where she has focused her work on national recovery and treating post-trauma on a personal and national level. She was elected to the Knesset after being placed in the 16th slot on the party's list.

== Personal life ==
She resides in Beit Zayit.
