= Kamil Abu Rokon =

Israeli military officer

- كميل ابو ركن
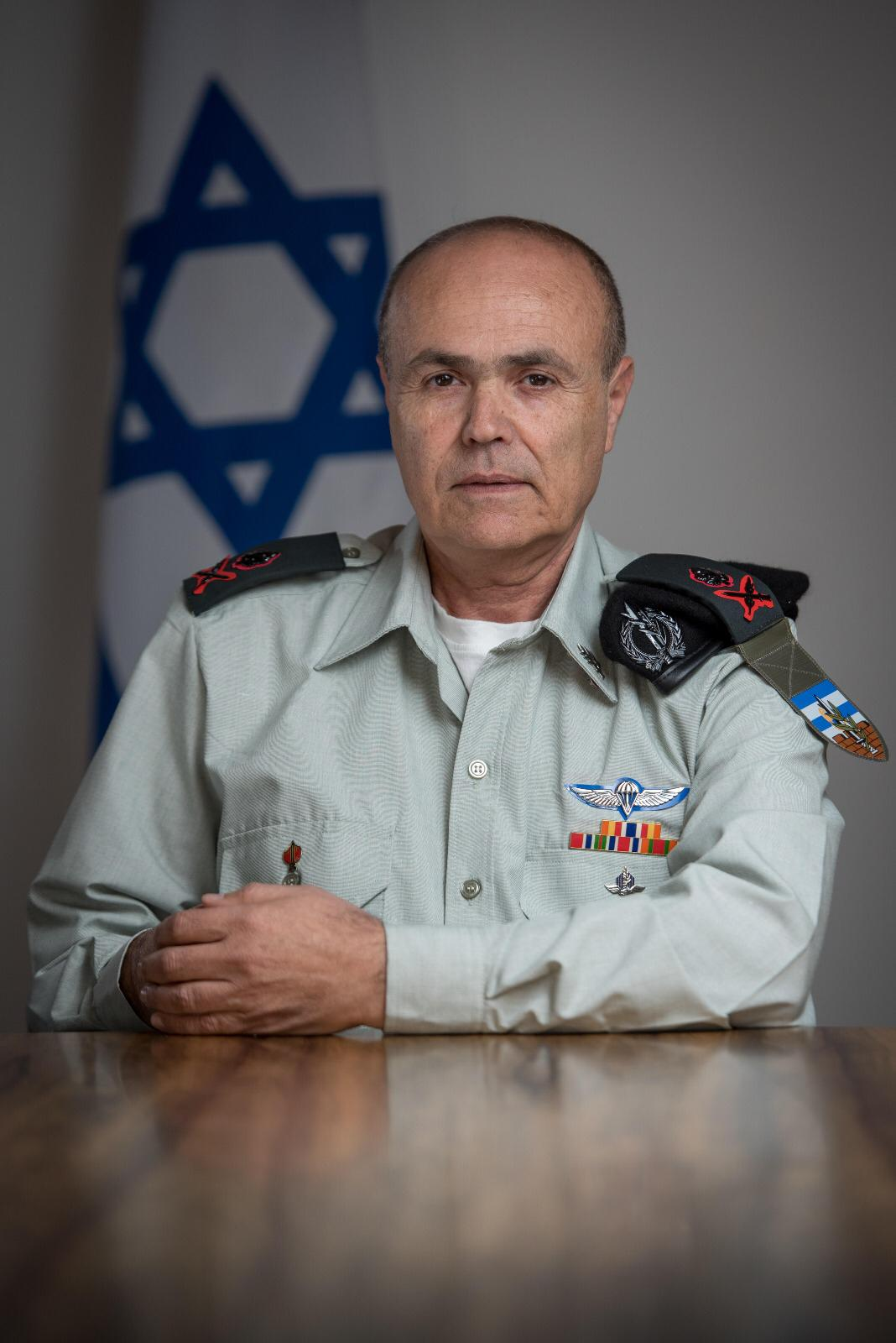

Faction represented in the Knesset
- 2026–: Yashar

Personal details
- Born: September 13, 1958 (age 68) Isfiya, Israel
- Education: University of Haifa

Military service
- Allegiance: Israel
- Branch/service: Israel Defense Forces
- Years of service: 1977–2021
- Rank: Aluf (Major General)
- Commands: Coordinator of Government Activities in the Territories (COGAT)
- Battles/wars: 1982 Lebanon War; First Intifada; South Lebanon conflict (1985–2000); Second Intifada; 2014 Gaza War

Kamil Abu Rokon (born 13 September 1958) is a retired Israel Defense Forces officer who served with the rank of Aluf. He served as the Coordinator of Government Activities in the Territories (COGAT). Ahead of the 2026 Israeli legislative election, he joined the electoral list of the Yashar! party led by Gadi Eisenkot, winning a seat in the election.

== Biography ==
Abu Rokon was born and raised in Isfiya to a Druze-Israeli family. He is the son of Raslan and Zakhiya Abu Rokon. His father served as head of the Isfiya Local Council from 1965 to 1988.

In November 1977, Abu Rokon enlisted in the Israel Defense Forces. After retiring from the IDF, Abu Rokon was appointed deputy director of the "Peace Administration" in the Israeli Ministry of Foreign Affairs. In 2009, he was appointed head of the Land Crossings Administration in the Ministry of Defense, and later became head of the Land Crossings Authority.

On 29 March 2018, Abu Rokon was promoted to the rank of Aluf.

== COGAT tenure ==
In December 2017, Defense Minister Avigdor Liberman announced the appointment of Abu Rokon as the next Coordinator of Government Activities in the Territories (COGAT), succeeding Major General Yoav Mordechai. Abu Rokon, then head of the Defense Ministry's Border Crossing Authority, was promoted to the rank of Aluf (major general) on 29 March 2018 in a ceremony at the IDF headquarters in Tel Aviv. He formally assumed the position in May 2018. He was the second Druze officer to hold the COGAT post and the second Druze to reach the rank of Aluf, following Yusef Mishlav.

On 6 April 2021, Abu Rokon completed his tenure and retired from the IDF.

== Political career ==
Ahead of the 2026 Israeli legislative election, he joined the electoral list of the Yashar! party led by Gadi Eisenkot. Abu Rokon was elected to the Knesset.

== Personal life ==
Abu Rokon lives in Isfiya. He is married and has three children.
