= Ofir Katz =

Israeli politician

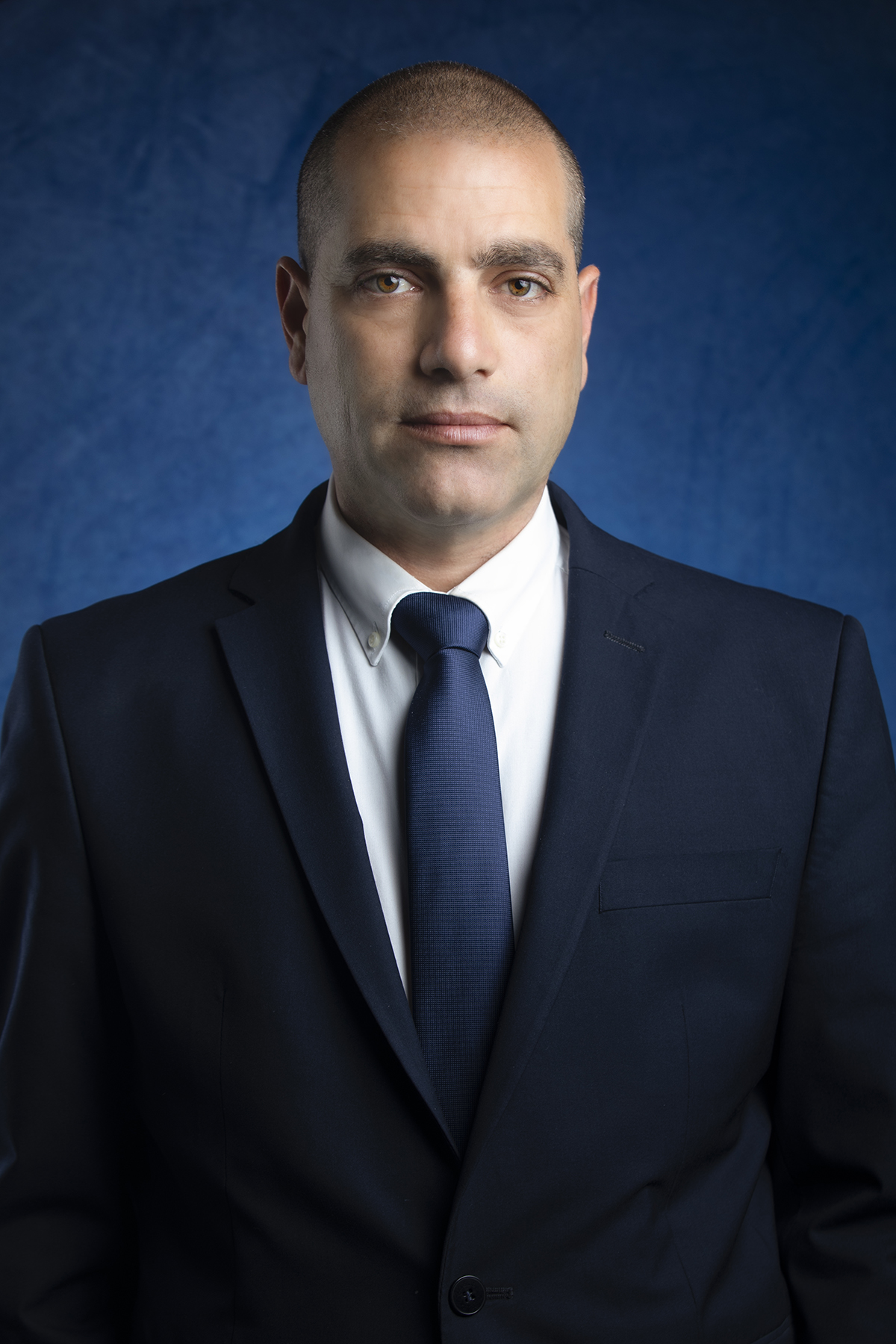
- Katz in 2022

Faction represented in the Knesset
- 2019–: Likud

Personal details
- Born: 19 May 1980 (age 46) Afula, Israel

Ofir Katz (Hebrew: אוֹפִיר כָּץ; born 19 May 1980) is a right-wing Israeli politician. He is currently a member of the Knesset for Likud and served as the thirty-seventh government of Israel's parliamentary whip.

== Personal life ==
He was born in Afula on 19 May 1980.

Katz is married with two children and lives in Afula.

== Political career ==
Katz joined Likud at the age of 18, and started working for the office of Benjamin Netanyahu when Likud were the opposition party in the late 2000s. When Likud became the ruling party after the 2009 election, he became an advisor to Minister of Culture and Sport Limor Livnat, before working for Gilad Erdan when he was minister of Internal Affairs and minister of Public Security.

In the build-up to the April 2019 elections, he was assigned the twentieth slot on the party's list, the slot reserved for the Galilee and Valleys. He was elected to the Knesset as Likud won 36 seats. Katz was appointed the parliamentary whip for the thirty-seventh government of Israel following its approval in late December 2022. He has served as the chair of the House Committee since 2023.

Katz was placed eighth on the party's list and was re-elected to the Knesset following the 2026 Israeli legislative election. The party selected Katz to run as the speaker of the Knesset against Matan Kahana, but Katz lost the vote.
