= Elisha Medan =

- אלישע יהודה מדן

Faction represented in the Knesset
- 2026–: Likud

Personal details
- Born: Elisha Yehuda Medan; 28 May 1979 (age 47)
- Party: Likud
- Children: 6
- Education: Yeshivat Ma'ale Gilboa

Military service
- Allegiance: Israel
- Branch/service: Israel Defense Forces
- Battles/wars: Israel–Hamas war

Elisha Yehuda Medan (Hebrew: אלישע יהודה מדן; born 28 May 1979) is an Israeli military reservist and politician. He is a member of the twenty-sixth Knesset as part of the Likud party. He was among the founders of Avigayil, an Israeli settlement in the southern Hebron Hills. During the Israel–Hamas war, he was critically wounded in combat in the Gaza Strip and lost both legs. In 2025, he was selected to light a torch at Israel's annual Independence Day ceremony on Mount Herzl.

Medan was elected to the Knesset on the Likud list in the 2026 Israeli legislative election, and is also the son of Rabbi Yaakov Medan.

== Biography ==
=== Early life and military service ===
Medan was born on 28 May 1979 to Ruti Medan, an educational counselor, and Rabbi Yaakov Medan, one of the heads of Yeshivat Har Etzion in Alon Shvut and a co-author of the Gavison–Medan Covenant. He is the second of seven children.

He studied at Ma'ale Gilboa Yeshiva. During his mandatory service in the Israel Defense Forces (IDF), he served as a combat soldier in the reconnaissance unit of the Paratroopers Brigade.

Following his military service, Medan was among the founders of Avigayil, an Israeli settlement in the southern Hebron Hills in the West Bank.

Following the 2014 kidnapping and murder of Israeli teenagers, Medan was among those who initiated the establishment of the IDF's Mar'ol Unit, a specialized search and tracking unit that uses field tracking techniques and terrain analysis to locate missing persons and other targets.

=== Injury during the Israel–Hamas war ===
Following the outbreak of the Israel–Hamas war in October 2023, Medan reported for reserve duty in the IDF's 697th Battalion, part of the 551st Reserve Paratroopers Brigade, also known as the Half-Fire Brigade. His unit participated in ground operations in the northern Gaza Strip.

On 11 November 2023, during a military operation in the Beit Hanoun area, an explosive device attached to a tunnel shaft near a mosque detonated, striking the force in which Medan was serving. Four soldiers from the unit were killed, including the company commander, Major Moshe Yedidya Leiter, son of Israel's Ambassador to the US Yechiel Leiter.

Medan sustained life-threatening injuries and multiple organ trauma, which ultimately resulted in the amputation of both legs above the knee. He was evacuated by helicopter to Shaare Zedek Medical Center in Jerusalem.

Following multiple surgical procedures and a prolonged hospitalization, Medan was transferred to rehabilitation after 53 days. He subsequently began using prosthetic legs.

=== Public activities ===
Following his injury, Medan began delivering lectures throughout Israel and appearing in the media. His talks address his experiences of combat and rehabilitation, as well as national unity and social cohesion.

In 2025, Medan was selected as one of the torchlighters at Israel's official Independence Day ceremony on Mount Herzl in Jerusalem. During the ceremony, he called for unity among Israelis.

Later that year, he received a Resilience Award from Hemdat Academic College.

=== Political career ===
In September 2026, ahead of the election to the 26th Knesset, Prime Minister Benjamin Netanyahu selected Medan for the 15th position on the Likud party's electoral list.

Medan was elected to the Knesset.

He set up a tent outside the Knesset, calling for a unity government.

== Personal life ==
Medan is married to Miri, the daughter of Israeli activist Meir Indor. The couple have six children and live in Kramim, a kibbutz in the Negev.
