= Party lists for the 2026 Israeli legislative election =

The 2026 Israeli legislative election was held using closed list proportional representation. Each party was required to present a list of candidates to the Central Elections Committee by 8 September 2026.

== Amcha Yisrael ==
Amcha Yisrael is headed by Ofer Winter and submitted their list on 7 September.

1. Ofer Winter
2. Yoseph Haddad
3. Netali Shem Tov
4. Eran Ben-Ari
5. Fleur Hassan-Nahoum
6. Lali Derai
7. Ronen Bodner
8. (Davidi Ben-Zion - resigned from the list on 14 October 2026)
9. Aviv Ezra
10. Sigal Kraunik-Attia
11. Eli Gino
12. Eric Rubin
13. Alam Ibrahim
14. Moshe Har-Zion
15. Lilach Haim Idelberg
16. Moshe Toledano
17. Raz Malka
18. Dor Yitzhak

== Blue and White ==
Blue and White is headed by Benny Gantz and submitted their list on 8 September. All Blue and White candidates submitted their resignation following the party's withdrawal from the elections on 19 October 2026.

1. Benny Gantz
2. Pnina Tamano-Shata
3. Aliza Bloch
4. Roee Konkol
5. Rotem Avidar Tzalik
6. Alon Schuster
7. Mufid Mari
8. Yerhudit Uliel Malka
9. Ariel Baziz
10. Moria Silfan

== The Democrats ==
The Democrats list is headed by Yair Golan and was submitted on 7 September. Candidates nominated on behalf of Meretz are marked with an M. All candidates after the 41st slot are lijstduwers who were not up for election in the party's primaries.

1. Yair Golan
2. Naama Lazimi
3. Gilad Kariv
4. Efrat Rayten
5. Yaya Fink
6. Gaby Lasky M
7. Omri Ronen
8. Michal Rozin M
9. Moshe Radman
10. Somaya Bashir
11. Nimrod Sheffer
12. Moran Zer Katzenstein
13. Avi Dabush
14. Emilie Moatti
15. Tomer Avital
16. Nava Rozolyo
17. Ram Shefa
18. Ali Salalha
19. Rotem Sivan
20. Eran Etzion
21. Moran Michel
22. Mossi Raz
23. Ghaleb Salamaneh
24. Katy Piasecki-Morag
25. Amir Khnifess
26. Mehereta Baruch-Ron
27. Ayid Badir
28. Chen Arieli
29. Gil Beilin
30. Yael Cohen Paran
31. Eran Nissan
32. Hadas Regolsky
33. Evyatar Be'er
34. Inbal Wertman Shoham
35. Binaymin Daniel Minich
36. Lee Hoffman-Agiv
37. Yaron Niv
38. Alice Goldman
39. Yoav Agami
40. Avishay Liechtenstein
41. Olivier Emmanuel De Lame
42. Israel Tzvi ben Shaul
43. Omer Lubaton Granot
44. Hadas Jaeger-Deliger
45. Hagar Reuveni
46. Yehudit Gilon
47. Tal Nevo Abitbul
48. Simon Alfasi
49. Tomer Reznik
50. Dagan Levin
51. Silvio Gabriel Joskowicz
52. Dror Ish Shalom Morag
53. Chaya Cohen
54. Orly Biti Shiloah
55. Maya Nouri Shaked
56. Eran Ben Yehuda
57. Roi Barzilai
58. Avraham Pardes
59. Abd al-Karim Zo'abi
60. Noga Botansky
61. Shanna Orlik
62. Ruth Malka Boneh
63. Yuval Schwartz
64. Farhan Abu Riash
65. Gal Ben David
66. Hadas Zangy
67. Merav Barkai
68. Esther Zakheim Grauss
69. Yosef Efrati
70. Nicholas Mas'ad
71. Limor Levinstein
72. Tal Fanz
73. Orit Maranda
74. Maggie Sela-Weger
75. Yaron Gadot
76. Dafna Cohen
77. Hanna Beit Halachmi
78. Tanya Sonya Cohen
79. Paz Zemach
80. Daniel Azoulay
81. Sharon Shalom
82. Ido Michaeli
83. Dikla Cohen
84. Roi Segman
85. Avshalom Peled
86. Nina Rachel Isakov
87. Zvi Nir
88. Yanai Rubinstein
89. Avraham Mencher Dvori
90. Yoram Kendall
91. Masha Sheindorf
92. Laura Verton
93. Hanna Sheindel Peretz
94. Irit Filmus
95. Talma Alyagon-Roz
96. Shmuel Dor
97. Frances Ruth Reda'i
98. Dedi Zucker
99. Yossef Murciano
100. Benjamin Zweig
101. Yocheved Lifshitz
102. Michal Biran
103. Hussniya Jabara
104. Anat Maor
105. Masha Lubelsky
106. Amira Sartani
107. Avraham Poraz
108. Yossi Beilin
109. Tamar Zandberg
110. Amram Mitzna
111. Micha Goldman
112. Ran Cohen
113. Ra'anan Cohen
114. Avshalom Vilan
115. Shimon Shetreet
116. Zehava Galon
117. Colette Avital
118. Haim Oron
119. Efraim Sneh
120. Uzi Baram

== Haredi Public ==
The Haredi Public list is headed by Moti Leitner, and submitted its list on 8 September.

1. Moti Leitner
2. Asher Fradi
3. Miriam Nechama Yaffe
4. Ziva Glanz
5. Mordechai Rubinstein
6. Yitzchok Adlerstein
7. Aharon Ungar
8. Yehuda Oppenheimer
9. Chaim Yehuda Leib Gottlieb
10. Yonah Shlomo Kaufman
11. Eliyahu Goldberg
12. Reuven Ohana

== Israel First ==
The Israel First list is headed by New Hope MK Sharren Haskel.

1. Sharren Haskel
2. Roey Danino
3. Nir Yoftaro
4. Wail Mugrabi

== Joint List ==
The Joint List list is headed by Yousef Jabareen and was submitted on 8 September. Jafar Farah, a Hadash member who was placed fourth on the list, withdrew from the race following sexual harassment claims. He was replaced by Faten Ghattas. Sami Abu Shehadeh, initially third on the party's electoral list, withdrew after Supreme Court President Yitzhak Amit informed him the supreme court was likely to uphold his disqualification by the Central Elections Committee.

Party key:
H - Hadash
T - Ta'al
B - Balad

1. Yousef Jabareen H
2. Ahmad Tibi T
3. Faten Ghattas H
4. Bakhar Awawdeh B
5. Ofer Cassif H
6. Youssef Atauna H
7. Maha Karkabi B
8. Ahmed Darawshe T
9. Nihaya Washahi H
10. Hassan Nassasra B
11. Haitham Zahalka T
12. Iyas Natour H
13. Abdullah Jessan T
14. Orly Noy B
15. Mor Stoler H
16. Iyatmad Qadan T
17. Omar Wached H
18. Muid Miyari B
19. Ghanim Ghazawi H
20. Umaniya Zoabi B

== Likud ==
The Likud list is headed by Benjamin Netanyahu and was submitted on 8 September. On 3 September, it was announced that Tally Gotliv had made a deal with Likud, allowing her to run with Otzma Yehudit and resigning her place on the list.

1. Benjamin Netanyahu
2. Eli Cohen
3. Amir Ohana
4. Yariv Levin
5. Miri Regev
6. Israel Katz
7. Gideon Sa'ar
8. Ofir Katz
9. Tali Gvili (Technically running as a New Hope candidate)
10. Yoav Kisch
11. Yaakov Bardugo
12. Miki Zohar
13. Almog Cohen
14. Amichai Chikli
15. Elisha Medan
16. David Peter
17. Moshe Saada
18. Haim Katz
19. Dudi Amsalem
20. Eti Atiya
21. Boaz Bismuth
22. David Bitan
23. Shlomo Karhi
24. Nir Barkat
25. Gila Gamliel
26. Eli Goldschmidt
27. Erez Tadmor
28. Shlomo Lerner
29. Itzik Bunzel
30. Moshe Binyamin Peretz
31. Shuki Ohana
32. Ze'ev Elkin
33. Amit Halevi
34. Keren Atiass-Bublil
35. Avihai Boaron
36. Efi Nave
37. Sharon Saada
38. Hanoch Milwidsky
39. Netanel Ohion
40. May Golan
41. Mulla Mulla
42. Zviel Robin
43. Gevra Worku
44. Keti Shitrit
45. Alex Fridman
46. Idit Silman
47. Ariel Kallner
48. Avi Dichter
49. Sasson Guetta
50. Shalom Danino
51. Shabtai Katash
52. Elyashiv Sar Shalom HaKohen Rabin Chaimov
53. Yosef Fitoussi
54. Abed Fares
55. Shay Galily
56. Matti Yogev
57. Ely Ayal
58. Shay Kalach
59. Uzi Dayan
60. Avshalom Tal
61. Alon Hadad
62. Dror Kapah
63. Samir Zidan
64. Avraham Dzhurayev
65. Osher Shekalim
66. Gabi Alosh
67. Chaikin Vitali
68. Almaz Zeru
69. Yoram Tamshut
70. Yohanan Mezamer Tov
71. Moshe Chaim Gorel
72. Yuhay Shitrit
73. Edy Cohen
74. Ze'ev Shemesh
75. Eli Shtivi
76. Afif Abed
77. May Hadar
78. Ya'akov Bar-Gil
79. Dor Harlap
80. Avihai Zion Shasha Cohen
81. Adi Baroch
82. Din Milo
83. Yoel Slomo Ben-Shoshan
84. Zion Lankri
85. Dodo Mur
86. Ariel Bochnik
87. Amatzia Aaron Michaelis
88. Ofir Saban
89. Ehud Ninyo
90. Oded Yhouda Soshrad
91. Goliath Lasker Marciano
92. Iris Rachel Stegman
93. Tzipora Feinberg
94. Yosef-Eil Ben Pinchas
95. David Avraham
96. Kochba Matityahu
97. Ratzon Sharabi
98. Rachel De Mercado
99. Aloni Memo Medina
100. Michael Kleiner
101. Meir Shimon Ohana
102. Tzafrir Salmon
103. Ayala Landa
104. Yonatan Gamliel Melamed
105. Orna Yifrach
106. Eleihu Shloch
107. Yosef Kister
108. Yitzhak Danieli
109. Baruch Natach
110. Bat Sheva HaHermoni
111. Yitzhak Meir Shishitzki
112. Michael Reif
113. Yael Shmergad
114. Hedva Spiegel
115. Naomi Blumenthal
116. Esther Timor
117. Inbal Pritana Gal
118. Benny Biton
119. Tzvika Brot
120. Haim Bibas

== Noam ==
The Noam list is headed by Avi Maoz and was submitted.

1. Avi Maoz
2. Shimon Tubul
3. Eliyahu Libman
4. Liora Alon
5. Yaska Haimov
6. Yair Avitan
7. Eliyahu Ozen
8. Meir Eylon
9. Babed Elkana
10. Eitan Vinberg

== Otzma Yehudit ==
The Otzma Yehudit list is headed by Itamar Ben-Gvir, and submitted its list on 7 September.

1. Itamar Ben-Gvir
2. Tally Gotliv
3. Yitzhak Wasserlauf
4. Amihai Eliyahu
5. Limor Son Har-Melech
6. Yitzhak Kroizer
7. Hanamel Dorfman
8. Tzachi Eliyahu
9. Yossi Goldberger
10. Itiel Ne'eman
11. David Babli (resigned from the list on 10 November 2026)
12. Yishai Fleisher
13. Shiran Mirzai
14. Shimi Golan
15. Yaniv Badelov
16. Aychlutm Masala
17. Gadi Mazuz
18. Mordechai Prizis
19. Aharon Amar
20. Or Eliya Yomtobian

== Religious Zionist Party-Zehut ==
The joint list between the Religious Zionist Party and Zehut, which is headed by Bezalel Smotrich was submitted on 8 September.

Party key:
RZ - Religious Zionist Party
Z - Zehut

1. Bezalel Smotrich RZ
2. Moshe Feiglin Z
3. Orit Strook RZ
4. Simcha Rothman RZ
5. Tzvika Mor RZ
6. Itamar Eitam RZ
7. Zvi Sukkot RZ
8. Yitzhak Zaga Z
9. Reut Ben Haim RZ
10. Omer Patziniach Z
11. Arcady Mutter Z
12. Ohad Tal RZ
13. Roei Kirshberg Z
14. Omer Rahamim RZ
15. Sima Hasson Z
16. Shmuel Sasson RZ
17. Shirel Lalum-Nahir Z
18. Zvika Vishingrad RZ
19. Iris Bernstein Z
20. Eitan Tam RZ
21. Yehuda Schwartzman Z
22. Moshe Peled RZ
23. Elad Izbozki Z
24. Yossi Bachar RZ
25. Hagai Grintzweig Z
26. Natan Moshe Zukerman RZ
27. Stanislav Tobolsky Z
28. Avraham Chaim Albert Diskin RZ
29. Shulamit Esther Leibler Z
30. Michal Waldiger RZ
31. (Avraham Shmuel Leibler Z - disqualified by the Central Elections Committee)
32. Yosef Chaim Shushan Z
33. Elisha Mendelsohn Z
34. Felix Neuber Z

== The Reservists and the Economic Party ==
The Reservists and the New Economic Party list, headed by Yoaz Hendel and Yaron Zelekha, was submitted on 7 September.

Party key:
R - The Reservists
N - New Economic Party

1. Yoaz Hendel R
2. Yaron Zelekha N
3. Einat Wilf R
4. Haviv Volibovich N
5. Yoav Adomi R
6. Ofir Langman N
7. Shlomi Dimri R
8. Lior Gilboa N
9. Tehila Peretz R
10. Shalom Biton N

== Shas ==
The Shas list was determined by the Moetzet Chachmei HaTorah, and finalized 8 September. The party submitted its list that day.

1. Aryeh Deri (resigned from the list)
2. Yinon Azulai
3. Michael Malchieli
4. Yoav Ben-Tzur
5. Haim Biton
6. Dror Amos (resigned from the list)
7. Moshe Abutbul (resigned from the list)
8. Uriel Buso
9. Yosef Taieb
10. Yonatan Mishraki
11. (Yosef Agnathan - resigned from the list on 2 November 2026)
12. Erez Malul
13. (Simon Moshiashvili - resigned from the list on 3 November 2026)
14. Uriel Cohen
15. (Israel Tzadka - resigned from the list on 2 November 2026)
16. Rafael Nimni
17. Moshe Ben-Naim
18. Masiash Rafael Eran Avichai
19. Ariel Binyamin Asher
20. Netanel Mor Yosef
21. Yehuda Butbul
22. Yossi Kakon
23. Elhanan Zvulun
24. Yitzhak Elmaliah
25. Netanel Alfalas
26. Avraham Avi Amsalem
27. Refael Cohen
28. Oren Gabay
29. Shlomo Alharar
30. Haim Saverli
31. Shlomo Azran
32. Benny Sitalkil
33. Rafael Branez
34. Yaakov David Marciano
35. Ami Biton
36. Maor Meir Ashash
37. Eldad Pinhas Gadasi
38. Yehiel Vaknin
39. Yigal Peretz
40. Yaniv Hanu
41. Shlomo Malka
42. Yaakov Admoni
43. Mordechai Vizgan
44. Yitzhak Tangy
45. Shlomo Zalman Soyunov
46. Yigal Kalfo Ashram
47. Bezalel David
48. Eliyahu David Shoshan
49. Naftali Cohen
50. Yechiel Tzruya
51. Haim Amron
52. Shmuel Marciano
53. Zvi Asulin
54. Ariel Yekutiel Golan
55. Yosef Haim Moalem
56. Tal Matityahu
57. Kfir Ovadia
58. Eli Ankonina
59. Yosef Oknin
60. Menachem David
61. Shlomo Netanel Peretz
62. Hanan Gabi Zigdon
63. Eliyahu Karai
64. Uri Ozan
65. Yaakov Yisrael Rabuch
66. Yitzhak Haddad
67. Avraham Sharvit
68. Shlomo Haddad
69. Mordechai Hai Pinchasi
70. Yosef Turgeman
71. Moshe Yefet
72. Yosef-Haim Brans
73. Robert Reuven Kaykov
74. Yinon Matzliah
75. Ra'anan Kafri
76. Doron Shoshan Taktuk
77. Efraim "Effi" Nimni
78. Elad Menachem
79. Reuven Yosef Filo
80. Meir David Brans
81. Yehuda Haim
82. Shalom Mamlia
83. Eliyahu David Bachaj
84. Malachi Butbul
85. Avraham Avital
86. Yisrael Nedar
87. Yonatan Menachem
88. Eliyahu Meir Belaish
89. Avtalyon Betzaleli
90. Shai Kaziyof
91. Adi Truzman
92. Yehuda Danino
93. Avraham Yisrael Atias
94. Avi Deri
95. Reuven Zagdon
96. Yisrael Malaiv
97. Meir Yisrael Kakon
98. Dan Binyamin Abuhatzeira
99. Yaakov Danino
100. Shai Hakshuri
101. Asher Suissa
102. Ami Kalfon
103. Roi Cohen
104. Avraham Haddad
105. Yaniv Abulof HaKohen
106. Asaf Nagar
107. Shimon Avitan
108. David Bensal
109. Amiel Kastoriano
110. Michael Davidov
111. Avraham Nagar
112. David Avraki
113. Michael Yaniv
114. Aharon Mordechai Cohen
115. Eden Ben-Shitrit
116. Shlomo Peretz
117. (Itzik Hugi - resigned from the list on 15 September 2026)
118. Hagai Avital
119. Shmuel Hazan
120. Ya'akov Margi

== Together ==
The Together list, headed by Naftali Bennett with Yair Lapid in the second slot, was submitted on 7 September 2026. The full Yesh Atid slate of candidates was announced on 5 September, with the list for Bennett 2026 announced the following day.

Party key:
B - Bennett 2026
Y - Yesh Atid

1. Naftali Bennett B
2. Yair Lapid Y
3. Keren Terner Eyal B
4. Meirav Ben-Ari Y
5. Liran Avishar Ben-Horin B
6. Noam Tibon Y
7. Michal Hirsch Negri B
8. Eitan Ginzburg B
9. Meirav Cohen Y
10. Yonatan Shalev B
11. Bruria Naim Arman B
12. Ram Ben-Barak Y
13. Amir Strugo B
14. Naor Shiri Y
15. Nissan Ze'evi B
16. Vladimir Beliak Y
17. Orly Harel B
18. Yorai Lahav-Hertzanu Y
19. Shahar Varon B
20. Yasmin Fridman Y
21. Esti Ayalon Kobo B
22. Jeremy Saltan B
23. Neta Attias Y
24. Tzvi Plotnitzky B
25. Moshe Tur-Paz Y
26. Olessia Kantor B
27. Simon Davidson Y
28. Mati Gill B
29. Tomer Wiener B
30. Shelly Tal Meron Y
31. Tami Muziel B
32. Roni Malkai Y
33. Yael Stern B
34. Matti Sarfati Harkavi Y
35. Amit Barda B

== United Arab List ==
The United Arab List, known by its acronym Ra'am, is headed by Mansour Abbas, with Yoav Segalovitz in the second slot, was submitted on 8 September.

1. Mansour Abbas
2. Yoav Segalovitz
3. Waleed Taha
4. Waleed Alhwashla
5. Iman Khatib-Yassin
6. Yasir Hujeirat
7. Ibrahim Al-Turi
8. Abd El-Karim Masri
9. Izzam Abd El-Karim
10. Ibrahim Abu-Laben

== United Torah Judaism ==
United Torah Judaism will be led by Ya'akov Asher. The Degel HaTorah list was announced on 6 September. The full list was submitted on 8 September.

Party key:
D - Degel HaTorah
A - Agudat Yisrael
H - Homat Torat Yisrael

1. Ya'akov Asher D
2. Yitzhak Goldknopf A
3. Yitzhak Pindrus D
4. Meir Porush H
5. Moshe Rosenthal D
6. Eliakim Stark H
7. Yehuda Weisfish D
8. Ya'akov Tessler A
9. Dudi Zeltz D
10. David Ohana D
11. Moshe Roth A
12. Eliyahu Baruchi D
13. Israel Porush A
14. Yitzhak Reich D
15. Yosef Bahem A
16. Ya'akov Asher Guterman D
17. Yossi Daitsh A
18. Shmuel Greenberg D
19. Yehiel Aryeh Vinterberg A
20. Yitzhak Ravitz D
21. Peretz Abramovich A
22. Menahem Mendel ShapiraD
23. Chaim Meir Wiesel A
24. (Moshe David Morgenstern D - Resigned from the list on October 4, 2026)
25. Ephraim Weber A
26. Eliezer Zvi Rauchberger D
27. Avraham Zvi Rosgold A
28. Avraham Ben Zion Deutch D
29. Menahem Alboim A
30. Mordechai Michael Alper D
31. Haim Meir Wiesel A
32. Shimon Yisrael Kellerman D
33. Yeshayahu Yitzhak Weissman A
34. Yisrael Yitzhak Golomb D
35. Avraham Alexander Ziskind Bressler A
36. Yosef Shaul ShitritD
37. Binyamin Ze'ev HaKar A
38. Pinhas Shalom Badush D
39. Yhusha Mendal A
40. Yehuda Yabrov D
41. Nachom Yechiel Klein A
42. Mordechai Zeev Blau D
43. Amram Dirnfeld A
44. Pinhas David Siroka D
45. Aharon Tierhuis A
46. Yitzhak Dov Berner D
47. Shlomo Deutch A
48. Meir Jaffe D
49. Baruch Eliezer Lutzkin A
50. Yisrael Meir Svardalov D
51. Hillel Rubinstein A
52. Avraham Pinhas Stern D
53. Shimon Goldberg A
54. Shlomo Efraim Pollack D
55. Yitzhak Aharon Klein A
56. Eliyahu Yosef Bruner D
57. Avraham Nahman Frankel A
58. Efraim Fischel Wiesel A
59. Meir Shacter A
60. Moshe Uri Disler D
61. Lebron Zvi Yosef A
62. Nahum Aharon Gitler D
63. David Nahman Rothner A
64. Yisrael Mordechai Silverstein D
65. Michael Dov Gerlitz A
66. (Yaakov Zevi Rosenstein D - Resigned from the list on October 4, 2026)
67. Shmuel Shuck A
68. Shlomo Brilliant D
69. Yitzhak Meir Brim A
70. Ephriem Yohanan Ben-Gad D
71. Haim Baruch Wichalder A
72. David Finkal D
73. Yehezkel Shraga Bankroth A
74. Haim Yehuda Reichman D
75. Yisrael Haim Cohen A
76. Ya'akov Grber D
77. Yisrael Miller A
78. Avshalom Yakoby D
79. David Spitzer A
80. Amar Liron D
81. Yaakov Haim Sorger A
82. Menahem Mendel Gold D
83. Yoel Froelich A
84. Abir Har Even D
85. Avraham Stern A
86. Ofer Elkayam D
87. Biniymin Ze'ev Glik A
88. Ofer Ezra D
89. Ya'akov Greenwald A
90. Elkana Weissenstern D
91. Yaakov Yosef Ganz A
92. Aryeh Yehuda Zisman D
93. Yisrael Leiser A
94. Shlomo Yehuda Goldenthal D
95. Menaham Mendal Rodeech A
96. David Miller D
97. Yisrael Frankel A
98. Efraim Weiss D
99. Haim Gross A
100. Yona Moshkovitz D
101. Avrahm Yaakov Levin A
102. Moshe Frank D
103. Haim Uri Brim A
104. Elhanan Arntroy D
105. Menahem Shimon Shlomo Aryeh Bernstein A
106. Moshe Man D
107. Haim Klein A
108. Menahem Schwartz D
109. Eliyahu Gafni A
110. Yaakov Vizbinski D
111. Yehezkel Shaul Landau A
112. Shimon Haddad D
113. Yosef Zvi Jacobovich A
114. Aryeh Zvi Boymel D
115. Yitzhak Bartler A
116. Eliezer Sorotzkin D
117. Avraham Schwartz A
118. Uri Maklev D
119. Hanoch Zeibert A
120. Moshe Gafni D

== Yashar ==
Yashar submitted its electoral list on 7 September. Candidates marked with YE were members of Yesodot Yisrael.

1. Gadi Eisenkot
2. Yoram Cohen
3. Orit Farkash-Hacohen
4. Adi Altschuler
5. Matan Kahana
6. Hili Tropper YE
7. Shaul Meridor
8. Tair Ifergan
9. Oshrat Gani Gonen
10. Shira Shapira YE
11. Inbar Harush Gity
12. Elazar Stern
13. Kamil Abu Rokon
14. Deborah Sharifian Bachar
15. Alex Rif
16. Inbar Yehezkeli Blilious
17. Roy Folkman
18. Israel Zari
19. Tal Ohana
20. Elyasaf Peretz YE
21. Yaffa Tebeje
22. Nir Hagbi
23. Ron Barkai
24. Shay Fisher
25. Lian Folk David
26. Roee Cohen
27. Ziv Rosen
28. Jocelyn Bash
29. Alon Futerman
30. Tali Molner
31. Gil Avriel
32. Shiran Ben David Ozeri
33. Eliran Aryeh
34. Helen Gelber
35. Shlomi Yehiav YE
36. Hila Meir
37. Ran Ben-Ariya Yitzkan
38. May Sachs Elianna
39. Gideon Zaga
40. Moshe Davidovich

== Yisrael Beiteinu ==
Yisrael Beiteinu announced its electoral list on 6 September and submitted it the following day.

1. Avigdor Lieberman
2. Rafi Ben Shitrit
3. Talya Lankri
4. Oded Forer
5. Yulia Malinovsky
6. Sharon Sharabi
7. Hamad Amar
8. Evgeny Sova
9. Elvira Kolihman
10. Dan Illouz
11. Lily Ben Ami
12. Yael Benvenisti
13. David Azoulay
14. Limor Magen Telem
15. Israel Ben Shitrit
16. Sharon Roffe Ofir
17. Mor Dekel
18. Michaela Levin-Shamir
19. Olivier Rafowicz
20. Yaakov (Yanki) Mozes

== Additional parties ==
The following are the electoral lists which have received limited political coverage and have appeared infrequently in opinion polls.

=== Ahi ===
Not to be confused with the political party Ahi which existed in the 2010s, the Ahi list is led by Yuval Elimelech. All members resigned from the list fallowing the party's withdrawal from the elections.

1. Yuval Elimelech
2. Avichai Afel
3. Erez Reuven
4. Avraham Dayan
5. Adir Cohen
6. Hanan Yehezkel
7. Yehuda Dadon
8. Garma Gad Wadaja
9. Yitzhak Snir
10. Rafael Suissa
11. Yoel Yakir Nahari

=== Betach ===
The Betach list is led by Semion Grafman.

1. Semion Grafman
2. Lubov Hanis
3. Dmitry Zeletkin

=== Beyachad Natzliach ===
The Beyachad Natzliach list is led by Avi Shaked.

1. Avi Shaked
2. Naim Atauna
3. Hathem Attalla
4. Hala Suleiman
5. Drar Amrih
6. Nada Wahbi
7. Muna Azzam
8. Bunana Sweidan
9. Omar Aruk

=== Bible Bloc ===
The Bible Bloc Party list is led by Dennis Lipkin.

1. Dennis Lipkin
2. Bracha Kal
3. Hanna Hava
4. David Friedman Binyamin

=== Brit Olam ===
The Brit Olam list is led by Ofer Pinhas Lifshitz.

1. Ofer Pinhas Lifshitz
2. Lev Savo
3. Liam Akhasha
4. Hani Ziada
5. Shimon Shapira
6. Hagai Eliezer Folkman
7. Mutzlach Badawi
8. Adva Folkman
9. Mashiach Aziz Lor
10. Yusef Al-Amar Huashla
11. Abd al-Adim Mariach

=== The Color Black ===
The Color Black list is led by Eliezer Baumrind.

1. Eliezer Baumrind
2. Eliyahu Dgani Dror
3. (Yonatan Isaschar - resigned from the list on 22 October 2026)
4. Yitzhak Chai Rafael HaCohen Rabin Chaimov
5. Yosef Trabelsi
6. Yaakov Chaim Miller
7. Yaakov Shama
8. Dov Ber Shapira
9. Moshe Levi
10. Moshe Dweck
11. Yehuda Cohen
12. Gad Yair Zvuloni
13. Yosef Bar-Shalom
14. Moshe Cohen
15. Hillel Shahaf
16. Yosef Levi
17. Elazar Cohen
18. Aharon Chaim Vaknin

=== Democtatorship ===
The Democtatorship list, running under the name Personal Safety, is led by Michael Topashchvilli.

1. Michael Topashshvili
2. Gabriel Kikozshvili
3. Ilya Kikozshvili
4. Makuela Hundiashvili
5. Nodari Yosbashvili
6. Yafit Kikozashvili

=== Hakahal ===
The Hakahal party is led by Shlomo Elboim.

1. Shlomo Elboim
2. Mendel Eldar Baruch
3. David Gabay
4. Amit Kuban Yedidia Zvi
5. Moshe Ze'ev Friedman
6. Elyasaf Bar-Lev
7. Elchanan Yosef Tzemach
8. Yitzhak Hod

=== HaTikun ===
The HaTikun list is led by Moshe Salmovitz.

1. Moshe Salmovitz
2. Yara Kablan
3. Yahel Sherman
4. Sharon Sinai-Simoni
5. Roman Sorotsky
6. Yehonatan Boris Sabag
7. Akram Araf
8. Chen Alon
9. Liat Ben Ezra
10. Asher Lahav
11. Reut Abramson
12. Roni Yirmias Laskar
13. Eden Salmovitz

=== Ihud Bnei HaBrit ===
The Ihud Bnei HaBrit list, also running under then name "Partnership for all", is led by Talal Alkrinawi.

1. Talal Alkrinawi
2. Abdallah Abu-Anam
3. Bishara Shalian
4. Ofer Cohen Eliezer
5. Oded Gol-Vardi
6. Estiban John Badar
7. Adel Shahada

=== Mishpat Tzedek ===
The Mishpat Tzedek list is led by Larissa Amir, the wife of Yigal Amir.

1. Larissa Amir
2. Geula Amir
3. Eliezer Yehudi
4. Yitzhak Cohen
5. Yelizaveta Yudin
6. Tatyana Vishnevetsky
7. Eliyahu Chaim Yefim Kalman
8. Dina Meyerson

=== New Order ===
The New Order list is led by Avital Ofek.

1. Avital Ofek
2. Naor Lavi
3. (Esther Rozen - resigned from the list on 17 September 2026)
4. Daniel Batito
5. Shemesh Zehavit
6. Paula Kevin
7. Jack Yaakov Tobul
8. Yosef Shavit
9. Eliz Khalili
10. Rinat Shavit
11. Doron Schwartz
12. Yarin Betito
13. Rina Elisheva Algrisi
14. Tirhas Birki
15. Shalom Zanzuri
16. (Lior Haim Naor - resigned from the list on 17 September 2026)
17. Annette Arlette Algrisi
18. Roy Zaidan
19. Maxim Bachman
20. Orly Suissa
21. (Uri Michaelov - disqualified by the Central Elections Committee)
22. Gonen Noam Singer
23. Sinai Nadav Gnosis
24. (Ashton Golan - disqualified by the Central Elections Committee)
25. Eyal Komorovski
26. Vyacheslav Yaron Elishaev
27. Uri Bar Zion
28. (Yael Yizre'eli-Netanel - resigned from the list on 17 September 2026)
29. Chen Halevi

=== Orot HaShahar ===
The Orot HaShahar list is led by Nissim Louk.

1. Nissim Louk
2. Benayahu Har-Shemesh
3. Shlomo Ansbacher
4. Yitzhak Avokart
5. Dov Halvertal
6. Shai Dromi
7. Natanela Levin
8. Viktor Siniov
9. Aryeh Kup
10. Moshe Yosef Cohen
11. Yosef Edrei
12. Ariel Yehuda Alon
13. Sigalit Gottesman

=== Paradise ===
The Paradise list is led by Israel Yeshua Ben-David.

1. Israel Yeshua Ben-David
2. Ya'akov Ben-Issaschar
3. Lior Cohen Ya'akov
4. Talia De Rothschild
5. David Podberi
6. Raz Kamus Badash
7. Avraham Mor-Chaim

=== Pirate Party ===
The Pirate Party list is led by Ohad Shem Tov.

1. Ohad Shem Tov
2. Noam Kuzar Visberger
3. Dan Ariely
4. Meital Rom
5. Roi Avraham Kleitman
6. Lydia Maltin
7. Lilach Rubin
8. Daniel Binyamin Felber
9. David Ayalon
10. Kit Lawrence Goldstein
11. Tehila Ron Hoffman
12. Avital Wertheimer
13. Re'i Halala Solberg
14. Reinhard Stoe
15. Nir Segev
16. Rami Ziv Maron
17. Netanel Cohen
18. Haim Almakias
19. Ehud Shahar Chalamish
20. Yoav David Weinstein
21. Dor-Shimshon Nahir
22. (Yehuda Aryeh Povich - disqualified by the Central Elections Committee)
23. Uri Gur
24. Netanel Romano
25. Or-Mordechai Oren

=== Sharshar ===
The Sharshar list is led by Eitan Shvili.

1. Eitan Shvili
2. Tamar Shvili
3. Ilan Elmaikes
4. Raya Ashar Shirazi
5. Eshti Haytam
6. Eyal David Mizrahi
7. Meir Mazal Tarim
8. Shimon Bruchim
9. Israel Amran
10. Erez Meir Rosenberg
11. Yogev Chen
12. Mahalalel Hirsch

=== Shma ===
The Shma list is led by Naftali Goldman, who is also its sole member.

=== Tkuma ===
The Tkuma list (not to be confused with Tkuma) is led by Elkana Federman.

1. Elkana Federman
2. Lotem Nagar
3. Shira Cohen
4. Miriam Avraham
5. Liana Mirela Peretz Chaimovich
6. Nachman Levi
7. David Yaba
8. Naama Nahari
9. Nimrod Arnin
10. Eitan Tzadok
11. Yanai Eliyahu
12. Shmuel Ramati
13. Dor Daniel Haim Suissa

=== Tzomet - Beit Yisrael ===
The joint list between Tzomet and Beit Yisrael is led by Gadi Yevarkan.

1. Gadi Yevarkan
2. Moshe Gerin
3. Yaniv Ashtmeker
4. Topaz Deutsch Ram
5. Elazar Tekle Tamir
6. Nitzan Nissan Elimelech
7. Efraim Yuval Kahana
8. Ines Elias
9. Asmamau Balay
10. David Lind
11. Avi Koh
12. Guy Reif

=== Women's Voice ===
The Women's Voice list is led by Amir Shadmi.

1. Amir Shadmi
2. Emma Bohadana
3. Talia Ben-Abu
4. Gadi Rozner
5. Zehavit Akko
6. Amir Shlomo Abaxis
7. Shmuel Kehimker
8. Michael Naftali Katz
9. Eran Shalem
10. Nadav Yitzhak Bohadana
11. Nir Mevorach Shlomi Bohadana
12. Shiran Amsalem
13. Idan Bohadana
14. Liron Abu Tzemach
15. Moran Lazar Bohadana

=== You and I ===
The You and I list is led by Alon Giladi.

1. Alon Giladi
2. Maia Giladi-Joulson
3. Itzik Zelkha
4. Lyudmilla Portanov
5. Ezra Shoham
6. Moshe Amoyal
7. Yehuda Sharabi
