= 2026 The Democrats primaries =

Israeli political party election

A primary election was held by The Democrats on 20 July 2026 to select its list of candidates ahead of the 2026 Israeli legislative election.

== Background ==
The Israeli Labor Party won 4 seats out of 120 in the 2022 Israeli legislative election, while Meretz failed to pass the electoral threshold for the first time in its history. Merav Michaeli resigned from the Labor Party leadership, with Yair Golan, a retired general and former Meretz MK, elected in May 2024 to succeed her. Golan's party leadership platform included establishing a new political framework that would unite Labor, Meretz, and other organizations on the political left, to be called The Democrats. Golan, whose candidacy for leader was supported by incumbent MKs Naama Lazimi and Gilad Kariv, won the leadership election with 95% of the vote, and signed a political unification agreement (without a full merger) between Meretz and Labor, which included a commitment to reserve a share of the seats for former Meretz members in the unified party's list. The agreement was signed on 30 June 2024 and the merger was approved by the parties in July the same year.

Every member of the party who joined at least one week before the primary was eligible to vote; the number of eligible voters was 112,638.

== Electoral system ==
The electoral system was based on that used for the last Israeli Labor Party Knesset primary in 2022. A multiple non-transferable vote system was used, with each voter having 6 to 8 votes, with the candidates having the most votes being placed higher in the list, subject to a zipper rule between men and women and quotas of reserved places.

Places 6, 8, and 14 were reserved for Meretz candidates, while places 12, 13, 18, 23, and 27 were reserved for rural (Kibbutz and Moshav residents) and minority (Arab and Druze) candidates. Though there was one rural reservation and four minority reservations, these were to be assigned together based on the number of votes; Meretz's reservations were assigned separately. In addition, the party leader has the right to appoint two candidates in every ten places, but not to the detriment of Meretz's reservations. The party's administration could change the positioning of up to two candidates, including those elected for the reserved quota, at the proposal of the party leader, for reasons of "the good of the Party, its electoral success, or if the candidate is found to undermine the Party's principles", subject to a hearing. Golan did not exercise his right to reserve candidates.

== Candidates ==
51 candidates were registered, excluding candidates who announced their intention to run but withdrew from official registration.

- Yoav Agami
- Chen Arieli
- Tomer Avital
- Ayid Badir (Note: Minority, Meretz)
- Malik Badir (Note: Minority)
- Mehereta Baruch-Ron
- Somaya Bashir
- Evyatar Be'er (Note: Rural)
- Gil Beilin
- Inbar Bezek
- Yael Cohen Paran
- Avi Dabush (Note: Rural, Meretz)
- Olivier Emmanuel De Lame
- Danny Elgarat
- Eran Etzion
- Yaya Fink
- Alice Goldman
- Ahsan Halaila
- Lee Hoffman-Agiv
- Gilad Kariv
- Amir Khnifess
- Gaby Lasky (Note: Meretz)
- Naama Lazimi
- Itay Leshem
- Avishay Liechtenstein
- Nidal Masalha
- Moran Michel
- Binyamin Daniel Minich
- Emilie Moatti
- Naor Narkis
- Eran Nissan
- Yaron Niv
- Yariv Oppenheimer
- Katy Piasecki-Morag
- Efrat Rayten
- Mossi Raz
- Moshe Radman
- Hadas Regolsky
- Omri Ronen
- Michal Rozin
- Nava Rozolyo
- Yair Rubinstein
- Ali Salalha
- Ghaleb Salamaneh
- Nimrod Sheffer
- Ihab Shalyan
- Dima Shapira
- Ram Shefa
- Rotem Sivan
- Inbal Wertman Shoham
- Moran Zer Katzenstein

Prominent persons who announced their intention to run but withdrew include Ami Dror and Ronen Tzur.

== Results ==
Incumbent MKs Naama Lazimi, Gilad Kariv, and Efrat Rayten were placed at the top of the list (immediately after Golan, who became lead candidate automatically as party leader), with 87,774, 83,084, and 73,915 votes respectively. Turnout stood at 86%, with nearly 97,000 members out of the party's approximately 113,000 casting their vote.

Results of party list primary
Candidate	Votes	%	Eligible reservations			Pos.	Notes
Candidate	Votes	%	Meretz	Rural	Minority	Pos.	Notes
Yair Golan	—N/a					1st	Position as party leader
Naama Lazimi (incumbent)	87,774	90.28				2nd	
Gilad Kariv (incumbent)	83,084	85.46				3rd	
Efrat Rayten (incumbent)	73,915	76.03				4th	
Yaya Fink	66,915	68.12				5th	
Gaby Lasky	35,493	36.51	Yes			6th	Position elevated to ensure Meretz's seat reservation
Omri Ronen	43,246	44.48				7th	Position lowered due to Meretz's reserved seats
Michal Rozin	23,345	24.01	Yes			8th	Position elevated to ensure Meretz's seat reservation
Moshe Radman	39,583	40.71				9th	Position lowered due to Meretz's reserved seats
Somaya Bashir	18,848	19.39			Yes	10th	Position elevated per gender balancing rules
Nimrod Sheffer	37,355	38.42				11th	Position lowered due to reserved seats and gender balancing rules
Moran Zer Katzenstein	17,005	17.49				12th	Position elevated per gender balancing rules; the reservation of the 12th seat to a minority or rural candidate was relinquished as an eligible candidate (Somaya Bashir) received enough votes to be elected to a higher position on the list
Avi Dabush	17,772	18.28	Yes	Yes		13th	The reservation of the 13th seat to a minority or rural candidate was relinquished as an eligible candidate (Avi Dabush) received enough votes to be elected to that position on the list without it
Emilie Moatti	14,174	14.58				14th	The reservation of the 14th seat to a Meretz candidate was relinquished as an eligible candidate (Avi Dabush) received enough votes to be elected to a higher position on the list
Tomer Avital	16,193	17.40				15th	Position lowered due to gender balancing rules
Nava Rozolyo	12,232	12.58				16th	Position elevated per gender balancing rules
Ram Shefa	15,596	16.04		Yes		17th	Position lowered due to reserved seats and gender balancing rules
Ali Salalha	13,174	13.55	Yes		Yes	18th	Position elevated to ensure minority seat reservation
Rotem Sivan	11,120	11.44		Yes		19th	Position elevated per gender balancing rules
Eran Etzion	15,473	15.91		Yes		20th	Position lowered due to gender balancing rules
Moran Michel	8,245	8.48				21st	Position elevated per gender balancing rules
Naor Narkis	15,345	15.78	Yes			22nd	Position lowered due to gender balancing rules
Nidal Masalha	8,053	8.28			Yes	23rd	Position elevated to ensure minority seat reservation
Katy Piasecki-Morag	8,084	8.31				24th	Position elevated per gender balancing rules
Mossi Raz	14,413	14.82	Yes			25th	Position lowered due to gender balancing rules
Mehereta Baruch-Ron	5,884	6.05				26th	Position elevated per gender balancing rules
Ghaleb Salamaneh	4,884	5.02			Yes	27th	Position elevated to ensure minority seat reservation
Inbar Bezek	4,311	4.43				28th	Position elevated per gender balancing rules
Yariv Oppenheimer	11,115	11.43	Yes			29th	Position lowered due to gender balancing rules
Chen Arieli	3,934	3.91				30th	
Danny Elgarat	9,432	9.70				31st	Position lowered due to gender balancing rules
Yael Cohen Paran	3,790	3.90				32nd	Position elevated per gender balancing rules
Amir Khnifess	3,979	4.05			Yes	33rd	Position lowered due to gender balancing rules
Hadas Regolsky	2,950	3.03				34th	
Ihab Shalyan	2,653	2.73			Yes	35th	
Inbal Wertman Shoham	2,273	2.34		Yes		36th	Position elevated per gender balancing rules
Ahsan Halaila	2,566	2.64			Yes	37th	Position lowered due to gender balancing rules
Lee Hoffman-Agiv	2,066	2.13				38th	Position elevated per gender balancing rules
Ayid Badir	2,542	2.61	Yes		Yes	39th	Position lowered due to gender balancing rules
Alice Goldman	1,153	1.19				40th	Position elevated per gender balancing rules
Itay Leshem	2,316	2.38				41st	Position lowered due to gender balancing rules
Gil Beilin	1,421	1.46				42nd	
Eran Nissan	1,364	1.40				43rd	
Malik Badir	1,063	1.09			Yes	44th	
Yair Rubinstein	776	0.80				45th	
Dima Shapira	596	0.61	Yes			46th	
Evyatar Be'er	365	0.38		Yes		47th	
Binaymin Daniel Minich	330	0.34				48th	
Yaron Niv	236	0.24				49th	
Yoav Agami	173	0.18				50th	
Avishay Liechtenstein	149	0.15				51st	
Olivier Emmanuel De Lame	145	0.15				52nd	

== Aftermath ==
Naor Narkis, Nidal Masalha, Inbar Bezek, Yariv Oppenheimer, Danny Elgarat, Ihab Shalyan, Ahsan Halaila, Itay Leshem, Malik Badir, and Dima Shapira, withdrew their candidacies between the primary and the submission of lists to the Central Electoral Commission, and therefore do not appear on the final nominated list. In addition, the final list also contains lijstduwers who did not run in the primaries, making up a full contingent of 120 candidates. In addition, only Gaby Lasky was formally nominated as a Meretz candidate, with the rest of the candidates, even those who are eligible for Meretz's reserved spots, being nominated as Democratic candidates.
