= Naor Narkis =

Israeli activist

- נאור נרקיס
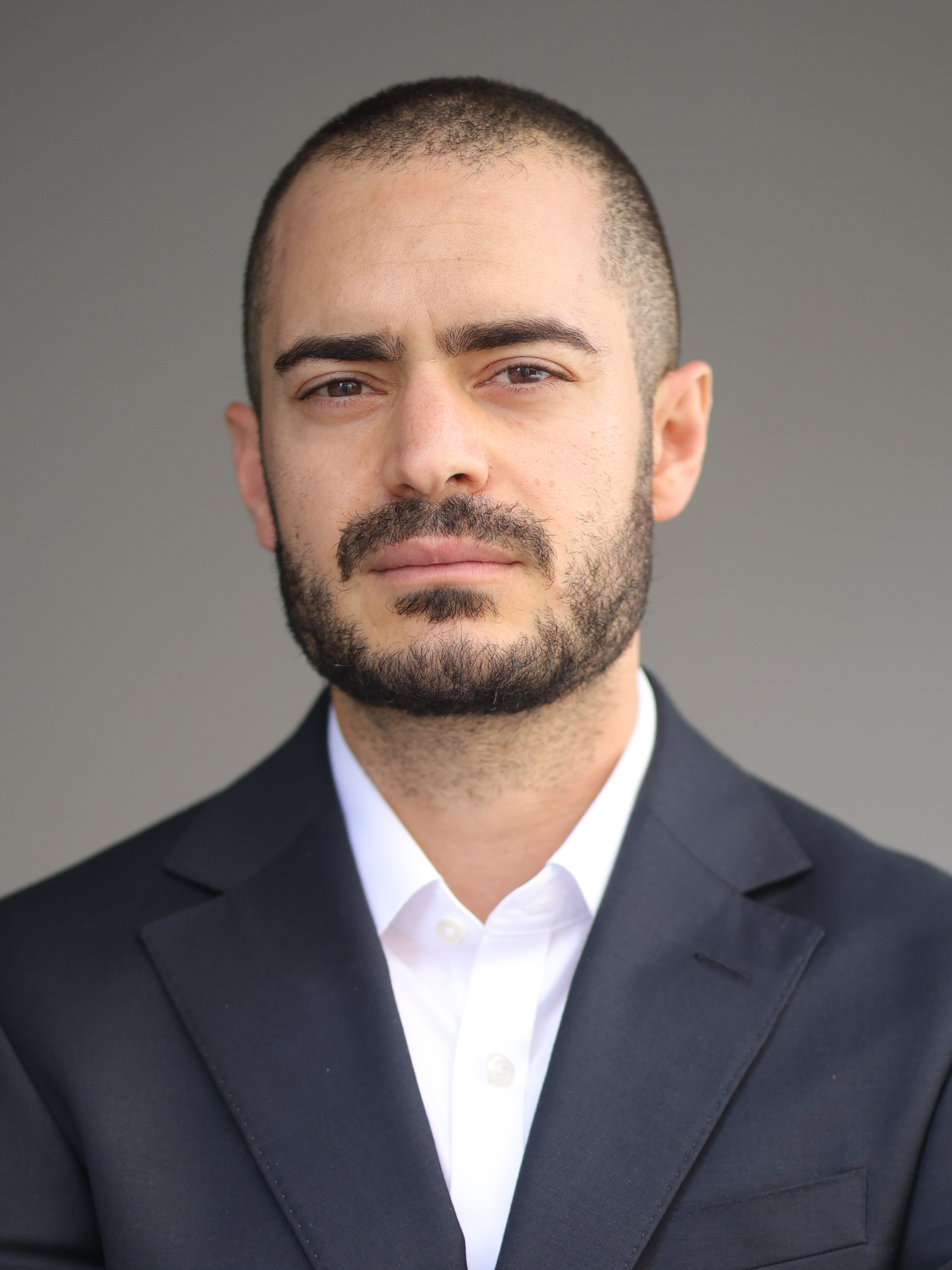
- Born: נאור מנחם נרקיס; January 11, 1989 (age 37); Ramat Gan, Israel
- Other name: Naor Menachem Narkis
- Citizenship: Israel
- Education: Blich High School; Haifa University
- Occupations: Entrepreneurship; Activism; Internet personality
- Years active: 2014-present
- Known for: Separation of religion and state activism
- Political party: The Democrats
- Movement: Olim L'Berlin, Israel Nehora, Huzrim BeTvuna
- Website: naornarkis.org

Naor Narkis (Hebrew: נאור מנחם נרקיס; born 11 January 1989) is an Israeli activist, entrepreneur and Internet personality. He was the leading initiator of Olim L'Berlin protest movement and Israel Nehora (lit. 'Israel enlightened'), an initiative aiming to secularize Ultra-Orthodox Jews and educating to atheism.

In 2026, Narkis ran for The Israeli Democrats party, promising he will fight for "secularization". He won 15,345 votes and was placed 22nd on the Democrats list for the 2026 Israeli legislative election.

== Early life ==
Naor Menachem Narkis was born, raised, and educated in Ramat Gan, the son of a secretary and a taxi driver. His middle name was given to him in memory of his uncle, Corporal Menachem Narkis Nargos, who perished in the sinking of the submarine INS Dakar, and whose burial place remains unknown. He attended Blich High School in his hometown.

=== Military service ===
In 2007, he enlisted in the Havatzalot Program, an elite program in the Israel Defense Forces, and graduated with honors. As part of the program, he earned a bachelor's degree in Philosophy and the History of the Middle East from the University of Haifa. He served in the Israel Defense Forces for seven years - initially as an intelligence officer in IDF's Research Department under the IDF Directorate of Military Intelligence (Aman). In 2014, he left the military after dealing with depression.

In 2014, Narkis lived in Berlin and worked as a mobile app programmer and a language teacher. He returned to Israel at the end of that year.

== Activism ==
=== Olim L'Berlin ===
In 2014, Narkis founded the viral Facebook community "Olim L'Berlin," which criticized the cost of living in Israel and invited young Israelis to move to Berlin to benefit from a lower cost of living. His advocacy focused on housing prices, everyday expenses, and the broader socio-economic issues in Israel, which he claimed posed a genuine risk to the future of the Jewish state.

Narkis was a main leader of the "Milky Protest", and his campaign was featured in the German newspaper Bild and the online edition of Der Spiegel. Throughout the protest, which received widespread media coverage, Narkis criticized the Israeli political establishment, led by Prime Minister Benjamin Netanyahu.

=== Secularization ===
In 2023, Narkis went out against rental listings at Yad2 restricted exclusively to religious applicants. He argued that such restrictions constituted religious discrimination. The site management complied with Narkis's request.

==== Huzrim BeTvuna ====
In 2022, shortly after the 2022 Israeli legislative election, Narkis established the movement "Israel Nehora" (lit. 'Israel enlightened') and the course "Huzrim BeTvuna" (lit. 'Back to reason'), both with the aim of secularizing Ultra-Orthodox Jews in the spirit of the Haskalah movement.

In August 2024, Narkis unveiled the course "Returning with Wisdom: The Course for the Secularization of Haredi Society in the Spirit of the Haskalah Movement" (Hebrew: חוזרים בתבונה – הקורס לחילון החברה החרדית ברוח תנועת ההשכלה). The course was written by former Ultra-Orthodox Jews, with the goal of helping Ultra-Orthodox Jews leave the sect, helping them economically and teaching them to integrate in the secular society. A billboard of the movement was vandalised in Bnei Brak.

In October 2024, following exposures by Narkis and activists from Huzrim BeTvuna regarding the issuance of campus cards to unqualified individuals by Ultra-Orthodox institutions, journalist Liat Ron conducted an investigation. Her findings revealed that numerous Haredi educational institutions issued student ID cards for a fee following brief telephone calls, enabling individuals to fraudulently obtain public transportation discounts.

In December 2024, Narkis went against tefillin-stands placed nearby Israel Railways stations and asked the railway management to allow secularization-laying stands as well. In response, Israel Railways announced a blanket ban on placing tefillin-stands and staffed stands of any kind on the grounds of train stations, and took action to remove the tefillin-stands from its property.

In the same month, Israeli Minister of Communications Shlomo Karhi blocked Narkis on social media. In response, Narkis sent him a warning before filing a defamation lawsuit, arguing that blocking citizens violated his freedom of expression and that members of the executive branch are not authorized to block citizens. A few hours later, the minister unblocked Narkis - claiming that it was done "by mistake".

== Politics ==
Narkis ran in the Israeli Democrats Party primary held in July 2026, in which he won 15,345 votes (17th place) and was placed 22nd on the final list.
