= Inbar Bezek =

Israeli politician

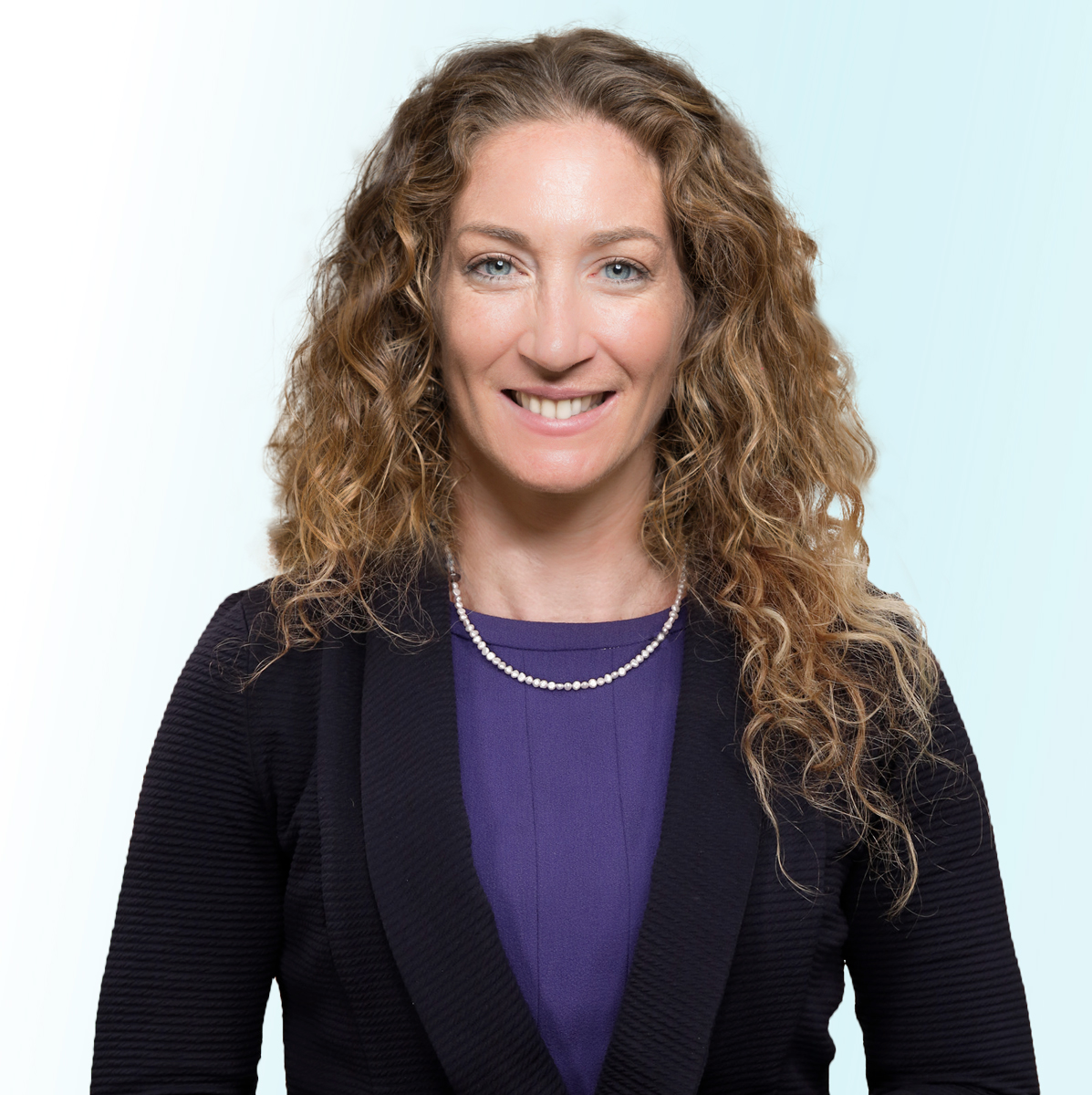
- Bezek in 2018

Faction represented in the Knesset
- 2021–2022: Yesh Atid

Personal details
- Born: 10 May 1974 (age 52) Safed, Israel

Inbar Bezek (Hebrew: ענבר בזק; born 10 May 1974) is an Israeli activist and politician. She was a member of Knesset for Yesh Atid from 2021 to 2022.

== Biography ==
An activist for self-employed workers, Bezek joined the Yesh Atid party. After it became part of the Blue and White alliance for the April 2019 elections, she was placed sixty-second on the Blue and White list, but failed to win a seat as the alliance won 35 seats. She was unsuccessful again in the September 2019 elections (in which she was placed fifth-eighth) and the March 2020 elections (for which she was placed fifty-fifth).

After Yesh Atid broke away from the alliance, she was placed twentieth on its list for the March 2021 elections. Although the party won only 17 seats, she entered the Knesset on 25 June as a replacement for Karine Elharrar, after Elharrar was appointed to the cabinet and resigned from the Knesset under the Norwegian Law. However, she opted not to contest the 2022 elections, forgoing being included on the Party list for election to the next Knesset. In May 2025, she announced she would be joining The Democrats, hailing its leader Yair Golan as the best suited to lead Israel's liberal and democratic camp (bloc).

== Private life ==
Bezek lives in Yuvalim, a community settlement in northern Israel.
