= Eran Etzion =

Israeli diplomat and politician

- ערן עציון
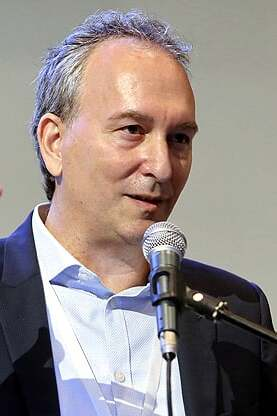
- Born: November 20, 1966 (age 59); Rehovot, Israel
- Occupations: diplomat; politician
- Political party: The Democrats (since 2024)
- Website: eranetzion.co.il

Eran Etzion (Hebrew: ערן עציון; born November 20, 1966) is an Israeli diplomat who served as Deputy Chief of the National Security Council, Israeli Consul in San Francisco, and Head of the Political Planning Division of the Ministry of Foreign Affairs.

== Biography ==
Etzion was born in Rehovot, to Naomi and Ya'ar. His grandfather is Professor Franz Brill, one of the fathers of psychiatry in Israel, who founded the first psychiatric clinic in the country.

A graduate of Aharon Katzir High School in Rehovot, Etzion served as a fighter in the Shaldag unit. He graduated with honors from Philosophy and East Asia Studies at the Hebrew University of Jerusalem. After his studies, he joined the Foreign Ministry's cadet course. Upon completion of the course, he was selected by the Ministry's Director General, Uri Savir, to serve as his assistant.

As part of his role as Assistant Director General of the Foreign Ministry, he was involved in negotiations with the Palestinians and Syria between 1994 and 1996. In August 1996, he began his role as Israel's consul in San Francisco and the northwest United States. In this role, he was responsible for relations with leading universities such as Stanford and Berkeley, with the high-tech industry in Silicon Valley, and with the Jewish communities in the region. Etzion was one of the initiators of the first Stanford Business School delegation to Israel. As part of his role, he maintained contacts with federal and state authorities in the region.

In August 2000, he returned to Israel and was asked by incoming National Security Council chief Uzi Dayan to serve as his chief of staff. He continued to serve under National Security Council chiefs Ephraim Halevi and Giora Eiland. In 2005, he was appointed Deputy Head of the National Security Council.

As part of his duties at the National Security Council, he dealt with all core issues of national security, including: Iran's nuclear program, the Palestinian issue, the northern front in Syria and Lebanon, the Israeli-Palestinian War, the strategic dialogue with the United States, and the formulation of the methodology for assessing the national security situation.

In 2008, he returned to the Foreign Ministry and was appointed head of the Foreign Ministry's Political Planning Division. In this role, he re-established the division, among other things, founded and led the Foreign Ministry's political-strategic situation assessment and formulated a proposal for a national foreign policy concept.

In 2013, he was appointed Deputy Ambassador of Israel to the United States, but due to an investigation by the Shin Bet on suspicion that he leaked sensitive information to a journalist, the appointment was suspended and he was ordered not to come to the ministry for more than a month.

Etzion chaired the Forum for Strategic Dialogue. He is a member of the MEI Research Institute in Washington. Founder and CEO of Raizit, a digital public engagement company. The company develops and operates advanced technological tools for public engagement, which enable public organizations to involve their stakeholders in decision-making processes.

== Political activism ==
He was one of the founders of the Yashar Party in 2018, which sought to implement direct democracy through the use of an app that would allow party members to determine the positions of its representatives in the Knesset. Etzion headed the party in the elections for the 21st Knesset, in which it won 1,438 votes. In preparation for the elections for the 22nd Knesset, Stav Shaffir announced the integration of the "Yashar" app into the activities of the Democratic Camp Party.

Etzion is active in protests against the government, frequently speaks at protest centers, runs a large X (Twitter) account, and appears as a commentator on television channels.

Eran has been a member of The Democrats Party since 2024 and was elected twentieth on the list in the preliminary elections held in 2026.
