= Karine Elharrar =

Israeli lawyer and politician

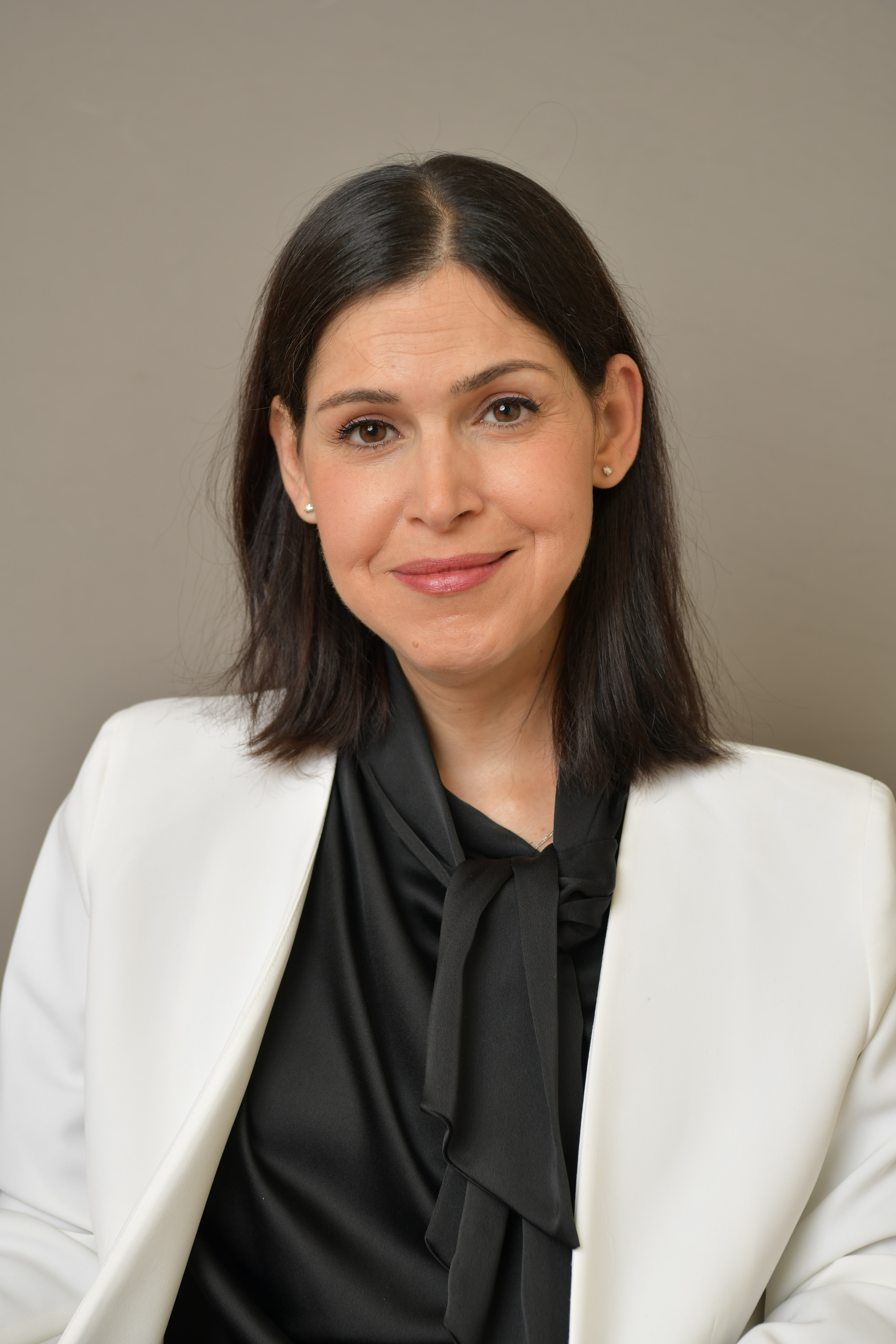

Ministerial roles
- 2021–2022: Minister of National Infrastructures, Energy and Water Resources

Faction represented in the Knesset
- 2013–2019: Yesh Atid
- 2019–2020: Blue and White
- 2020–2021: Yesh Atid
- 2022–2026: Yesh Atid

Personal details
- Born: 9 October 1977 (age 49) Holon, Israel

Karine Elharrar-Hartstein (Hebrew: קארין אלהרר-הרטשטיין; born 9 October 1977) is an Israeli lawyer and politician who served as a member of the Knesset for Yesh Atid from 2013 to 2026. She was Minister of National Infrastructures, Energy and Water Resources from 2021 to 2022.

== Biography ==
Elharrar was born in Holon in 1977 to Moti and Colette Elharrar, who were Moroccan Jewish immigrants. Elharrar attended Kugel High School, and studied law at the College of Management Academic Studies for a bachelor's degree, before gaining an LLM from the Washington College of Law at American University. Between 2008 and 2013 she headed the legal clinic at Bar-Ilan University, and specialised in the rights of Holocaust survivors, people with disabilities, and pensioners.

In September 2023, Elharrar was slightly injured when she was hit by a car while crossing a street in her wheelchair in Rishon LeZion; she was hospitalized at Sheba Medical Center and released the same day.

Elharrar lives in Rishon LeZion, and is married with two children. She has muscular dystrophy and uses a wheelchair.

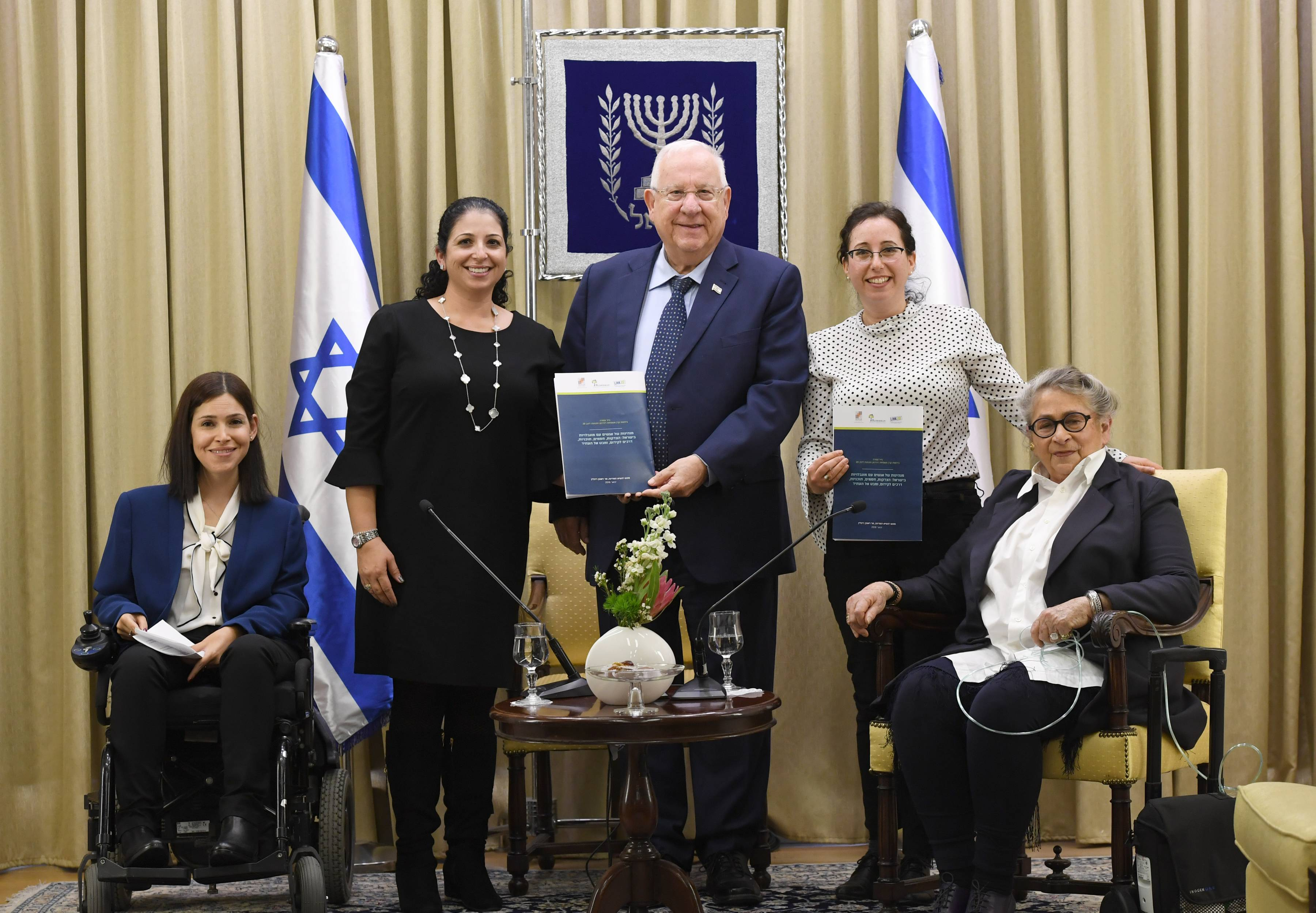
Karine Elharrar (far left) meeting with President Reuven Rivlin on "Leadership and Disability" in January 2018

== Political career ==
She joined the new Yesh Atid party in 2012 and was placed tenth on the party's list for the 2013 Knesset elections. She entered the Knesset as the party won 19 seats. She was placed eighth on the party's list for the 2015 elections, and was re-elected as the party won 11 seats. She was re-elected in elections in April 2019, September 2019 and 2020, during which Yesh Atid was part of the Blue and White alliance.

After being re-elected again in the March 2021 elections, she was appointed Minister of National Infrastructures, Energy and Water Resources in the new government. In June she resigned from the Knesset under the Norwegian Law and was replaced by Inbar Bezek.

In June 2023, Elharrar was elected as the opposition's representative on the Judicial Selection Committee, defeating rival candidate Tally Gotliv in a narrow Knesset vote of 58 to 56.

Elharrar made headlines during the COP26 conference in Glasgow, after she was forced to return to her hotel in Edinburgh due to the event not being wheelchair-accessible. She received an apology from British Prime Minister Boris Johnson, with the disability charity Scope calling the incident "inexcusable"; however, Elharrar said it was "a good experience to make sure the next UN conference will be accessible."

She announced in early September 2026 that she would not run in the 2026 Israeli legislative election.

== Personal life ==
In a July 2023 interview, Elharrar said she leaves most of the day-to-day care of her children to her partner, and revealed her aspiration to one day serve as Israel's Minister of Justice.

== See also ==
- Women of Israel
