= Olim L'Berlin =

Facebook page

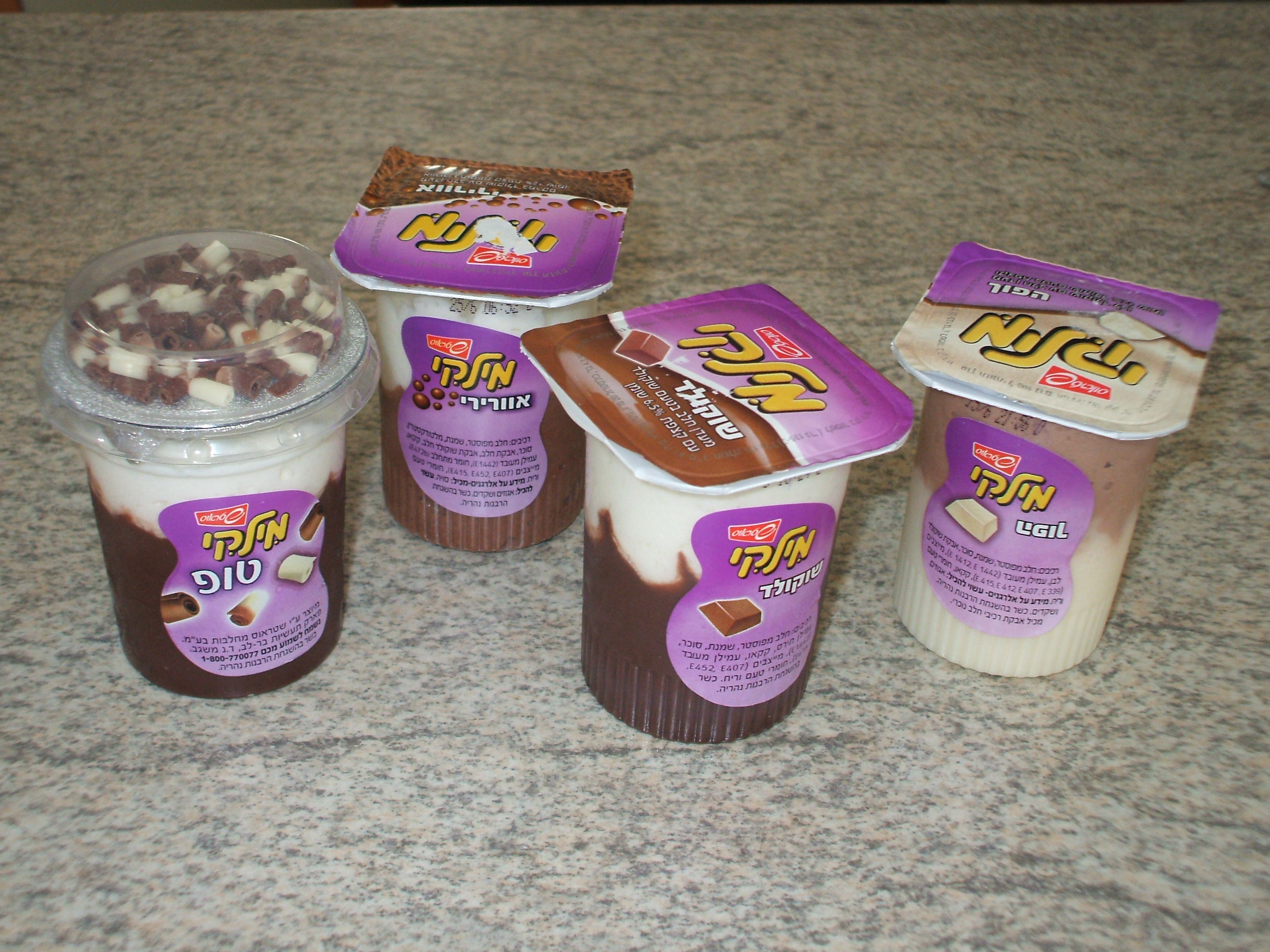
Milky pudding in different flavors

Olim L'Berlin (Hebrew: עולים לברלין, lit. 'Let's Move to Berlin', also known as the Milky protest) was the name of a Facebook page that coined a snowclone in 2014, and was terminated in early 2015. Comparing the high cost of living in Israel with the comparatively cheaper economic climate in Berlin, which has a growing community of Israeli expatriates, the page urged more Israelis to move to Germany, raising a storm of protest in Israeli social and political circles. Compounding the reaction was the Facebook page's use of the same verb (olim) that Jews use for aliyah (immigration to Israel).

The Facebook page based its cost-of-living comparison on the price of grocery items in Israel and Germany, among them a pudding dessert similar to the popular Israeli pudding known as Milky. The grocery bill was found to be three times higher in Israel than in Germany. The Facebook page and subsequent public debate became known as the "Battle For The Milky" (הקרב על המילקי) in Israel, or "Milky Protest" in international media.

== Background ==
Milky pudding, based on a former Danone product and produced by Strauss, is one of the best-known and best-selling dessert products in Israel. The chocolate-flavored Milky was introduced in 1979, followed by the vanilla-flavored version in 1980. In 1986, a video commercial called "Battle of the Milky" (הקרב על המילקי) was released in cinemas, showing supermarket customers racing each other down the aisle to grab the last chocolate-flavored Milky off the shelf. Evoking the cottage cheese protests in Israel in 2011, the Facebook site owner chose the popular Milky pudding as a new symbol of protest against Israel's high consumer prices, calling for Israelis to emigrate to Berlin to enjoy a lower cost of living.

Berlin is known as a "cheap and shabby-chic" city with a lower cost of living than Israel and a growing population of Israeli expatriates. It is among the cities that now attract "the type who made Tel Aviv cool" – young, single, and often female graduates; artists, filmmakers, musicians, and other members of the creative class. According to unofficial estimates, between 3,000 and 20,000 young Israelis and Western European Jews relocated to Berlin between 2009 and 2014; an estimated 25,000 Israelis were residents of the city in 2014.

== Controversy ==
On September 29, 2014, a Hebrew-language Facebook page called Olim L'Berlin was launched by an anonymous site owner. On October 5, the page showed a picture of a Berlin supermarket receipt for a variety of products, including bread, eggs, noodles, orange juice, and three containers of a chocolate pudding dessert. Beside it was a picture of a Milky-like chocolate pudding product topped with whipped cream. The site challenged Israelis to buy exactly the same list of groceries in Israel for less. The pudding alone cost the equivalent of 1 shekel in Germany, as opposed to 4 or 5 shekels in Israel. The equivalent grocery bill was found to be three times higher in Israel than in Germany.

Besides reminding Israelis of the high cost of living in their country, the name of the Facebook page was a distortion of the Zionist ideal of aliyah, using the same verb (olim) to suggest emigration to Germany instead. Finance Minister Yair Lapid called the owner of the site "anti-Zionist". The fact that Germany was chosen as the destination struck a raw nerve across the social and political spectrum, considering Israel's founding in 1948 in the wake of the Holocaust, its large population of Holocaust survivors, and the many citizens who still refuse to buy products made in Germany. "Are the gas chambers in Berlin also cheaper than here?" one visitor posted to the Facebook page. Israel HaYom branded the Facebook page as "an insult to all Holocaust survivors". Agriculture Minister Yair Shamir stated, "I pity the Israelis who no longer remember the Holocaust and abandoned Israel for a pudding".

The Facebook page garnered 13,000 likes within hours of its posting and reached 1 million hits within four days. The so-called "Milky Protest" was widely covered by international media. The site owner refused to reveal his identity or to be interviewed by the Israeli press; he was known only as a 25-year-old Israeli and ex-IDF officer living in Berlin.

Five days after the page went live, the site owner claimed he had received 12,000 messages from Israelis and was actively advising Israelis how to emigrate. He told Channel 2 that he had petitioned German Chancellor Angela Merkel to issue 25,000 temporary visas to accommodate Israelis looking for work in Germany. From his home in Berlin, he organized an "emigration fair" in Rabin Square in Tel Aviv on October 14, 2014. Though 2,300 people registered on the Facebook page to attend, fewer than 100 participants showed up.

On October 14, 2015, The Washington Post revealed that the site owner was Naor Narkis, a 25-year-old former officer of the Intelligence Corps and a freelance mobile app designer living in Berlin. Narkis had first emigrated to France five months earlier, but was put off by strains of antisemitism and the high cost of living in Paris. He found much less antisemitism in Germany and a more welcoming atmosphere for Israelis there, as well as the "cheap and cool" factor of Berlin. He claimed that the high cost of living in Israel was "forcing young people into exile".

By October 26, The Jerusalem Post had reported that Narkis planned to return to Israel, saying that his Facebook protest had become "less effective" since he revealed his identity, and that the site would be taken down upon his return to Israel.

== Other responses ==
In a play on the original page, other Olim L'... Facebook pages sprang up to provide destinations for emigrating Israelis, including Olim L'Prague, Olim L'Detroit, and Olim L'Maadim (Hebrew name for Mars). Like the original page, these groups were mocked by Right-wing Zionists as Post-Zionism, which harmed their potential popularity.
