= Somaya Bashir =

Israeli politician (born 1974)

- סומיה בשיר سميه بشير
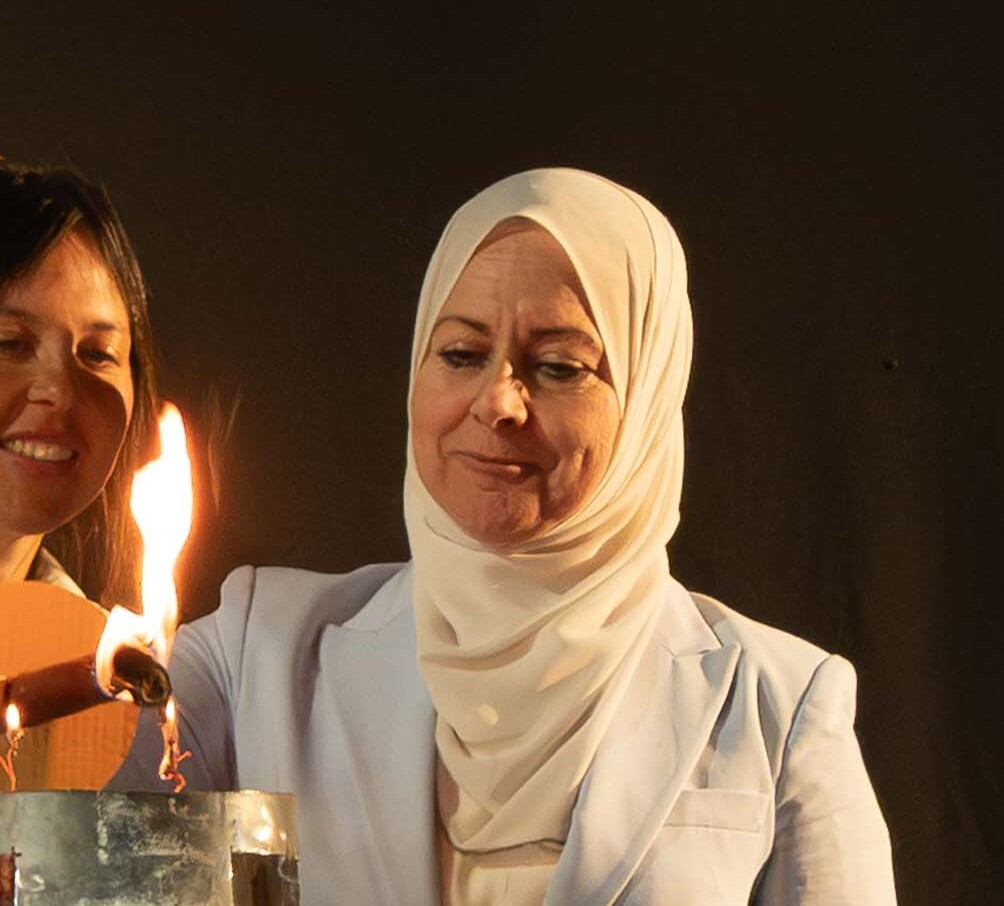
- Bashir in 2026

Personal details
- Born: 23 June 1974 (age 52) Jatt, Israel
- Party: Democrats (since 2024)
- Other political affiliations: Ta'al (2004–2009); Labor (2022–2024)
- Children: 5
- Education: Levinsky College of Education
- Occupation: Therapist • Activist

Somaya Bashir (born 23 June 1974) is an Arab-Israeli social and political activist and a music therapist. Bashir is recognized as a prominent activist for Jewish–Arab partnership, civil equality, and the advancement of women's status in Arab society.

== Early life and career ==
Somaya Bashir was born in Jatt, Israel, into a Muslim Arab-Israeli family. The youngest of eight children, her father was a bus driver and her mother was a homemaker. She has described her family as religious and liberal. As a child she attended a summer camp for Egged employees in Pardes Hanna-Karkur and made Jewish friends, though her mother warned her to "never believe the Jews" due her experiences during the 1948 Arab–Israeli War.

Bashir initially wished to study law, but her parents refused, and instead went through special education. After her graduation, she sought employment in the Israel's Education Ministry, and there learned about a course in music and movement therapy at the Levinsky College of Education in Tel Aviv, which she took. As of 2026, she is an emotional therapist and psychologist in Jatt, working at a school for disabled children.

== Activism and political career ==
According to Bashir, prior to 2026, she mostly abstained from voting, common among Arab Israelis, but may have voted once. At the age of 30, Bashir joined the Arab political party Ta'al due to her supporting their leader Ahmad Tibi, who appointed her to the party's select committee. She was asked to drop her Knesset candidacy in favor of an elderly male politician, and she subsequently left the party.

Bashir's prediction that the 2022 Hadera shooting, committed by two Arab Israelis, would have negative repercussions on all Arab Israelis, inspired her to begin her activism. She subsequently founded the nonprofit organization We Have No Other Land, which promotes cooperation and equality between Israeli Arabs and Jews and anti-racism. She is also the head of the Arab women’s division of Women Wage Peace. She is also a prominent member of Moshe Radman's activist organization Anchor for the Future. Bashir has promoted Arab participation in national service as an alternative to military service, and her activism has been credited with increasing Arab women's participation in national service.

She again sought to be elected to the Knesset in the 2022 election, this time with the Israeli Labor Party. She ultimately did not run as she was unable to get a meeting with party leader Merav Michaeli, and then encouraged Arab voters to abstain, which she said in 2026 that she regretted.

In early 2026, she announced her candidacy in the primaries of The Democrats, for the 2026 Israeli legislative election. In The Democrats primary elections held on 20 July 2026, ahead of the legislative election, Bashir came in at number ten on the slate. She received 18,848 votes. This was considered a realistic slot for Bashir to enter the Knesset. In the legislative election, the party was successful with eight seats, but commentators argued that it fell short among Arab voters, with Bashir being the highest-placed Arab candidate.

== Political views ==
Bashir considers herself to be Arab, Israeli, Palestinian, a feminist, and a religious Muslim who supports the separation of church and state. She has advocated for cooperation between Israeli Arab and Jews to solve the country's crises. When asked in an interview with Haaretz if she was a Zionist, Bashir responded:

For the Palestinians the word 'Zionism' has negative connotations; it symbolizes erasure and establishment of new life on top of their grave. But as I mingled more with and integrated into Jewish society, I understood that true Zionism is love of the soil, love of the nation and recognition of the Other. All my Jewish friends are Zionists, and they think that I am a Zionist because I want to safeguard Israel and its security. I also think that Israel needs to safeguard me.

She has criticized the right-wing government led by Prime Minister Benjamin Netanyahu for ignoring high crime and homicide rates in Arab Israeli communities, claiming it supports such violence. She supports a two-state solution to the Israeli–Palestinian conflict. She has spoken against the Gaza War, the far-right minister Itamar Ben-Gvir, Israeli settler violence, the 2023 Israeli judicial reform, and denialism of atrocities of the October 7 attacks.

Bashir has also criticized Israel's Arab parties, claiming that they have been unable to effect change from outside majority-Jewish parties, contrasting it with diaspora Jews joining mainstream political parties in their respective countries. She criticized Ra'am leader Mansour Abbas for not doing more for Arabs during the government headed by Naftali Bennett and Yair Lapid, which the party was a member of. She described Balad as an extremist party because it "does not recognize the Jewish state", and criticized its leader Sami Abu Shehadeh for focusing on the 2026 Iran war over local Arab issues and its former leader Jamal Zahalka for keeping women out of leadership positions. She claimed that The Democrats are the only political party meaningfully engaging with Arab society.

== Personal life ==
Bashir married her first husband at the age of 25, and they had three daughters. They later divorced, and she had him arrested after he threatened her with violence. She met her current husband, Anwar Bashir, a native of Acre, Israel, through a dating app. They married and have two children.

== See also ==
- Ibtisam Mara'ana
- Iman Khatib-Yassin
- Issawi Frej
