= Mehereta Baruch-Ron =

Israeli politician

- מהרטה ברוך-רון
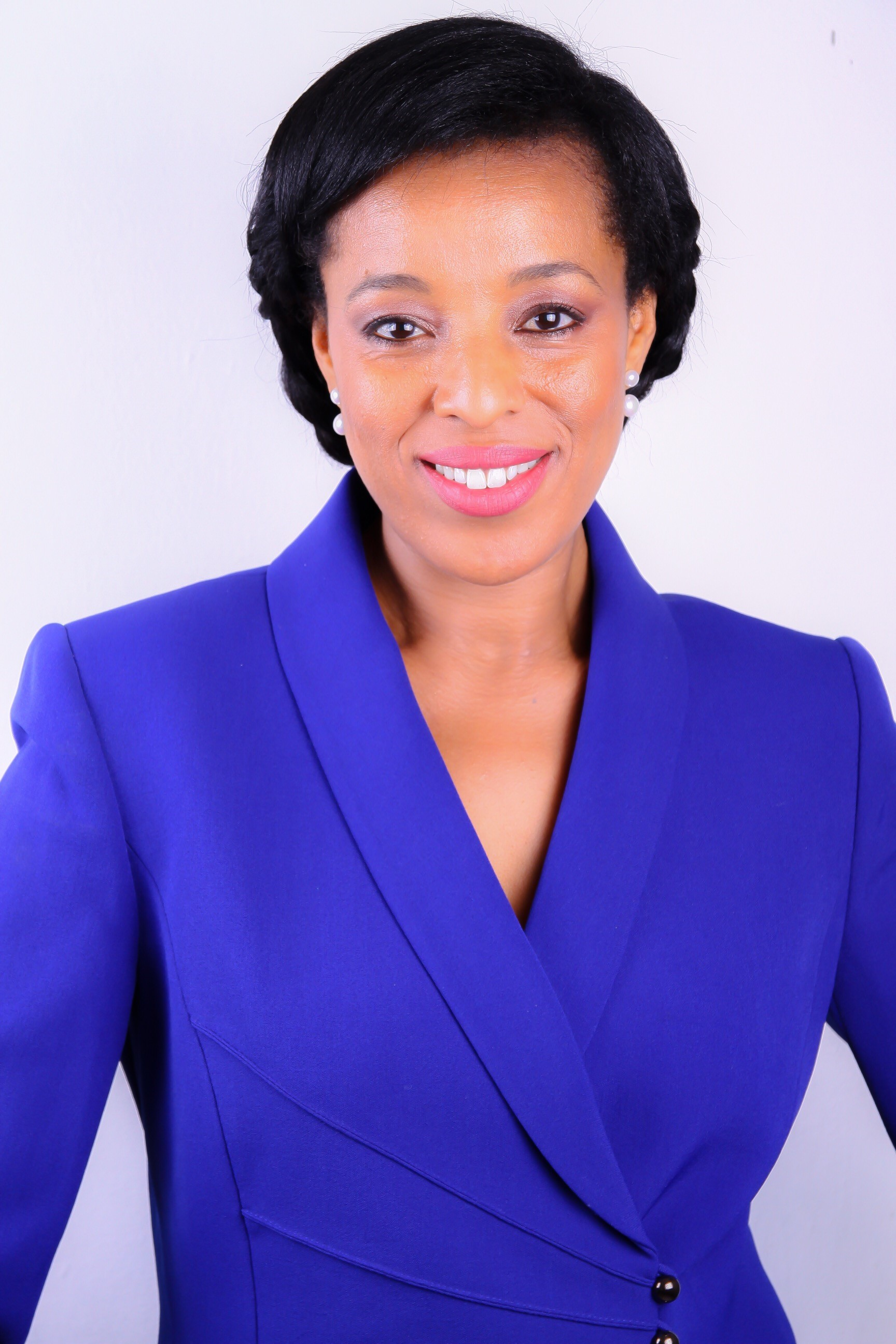
- Baruch-Ron in 2017

Deputy Mayor of Tel Aviv
- In office 30 December 2013 – 30 October 2018
- President: Ron Huldai

Personal details
- Born: Mehereta Baruch; 3 December 1974 (age 51) Ethiopia
- Party: Democrats (since 2024)
- Other political affiliations: Meretz (2013–2022); Labor (2022–2024)
- Spouse: Eran Ron
- Children: 3
- Education: University of Haifa
- Occupation: Psychologist • Politician

Mehereta Baruch-Ron Hebrew: מהרטה ברוך-רון; born 3 December 1974) is a politician in the State of Israel.

Baruch-Ron was the deputy mayor of Tel Aviv-Yafo. Baruch-Ron is the first Ethiopian to be elected to serve on the Tel Aviv-Yafo city council, and the first to serve as deputy mayor.
