= Nimrod Sheffer =

Israeli pilot, major general, and political activist

- נמרוד שפר
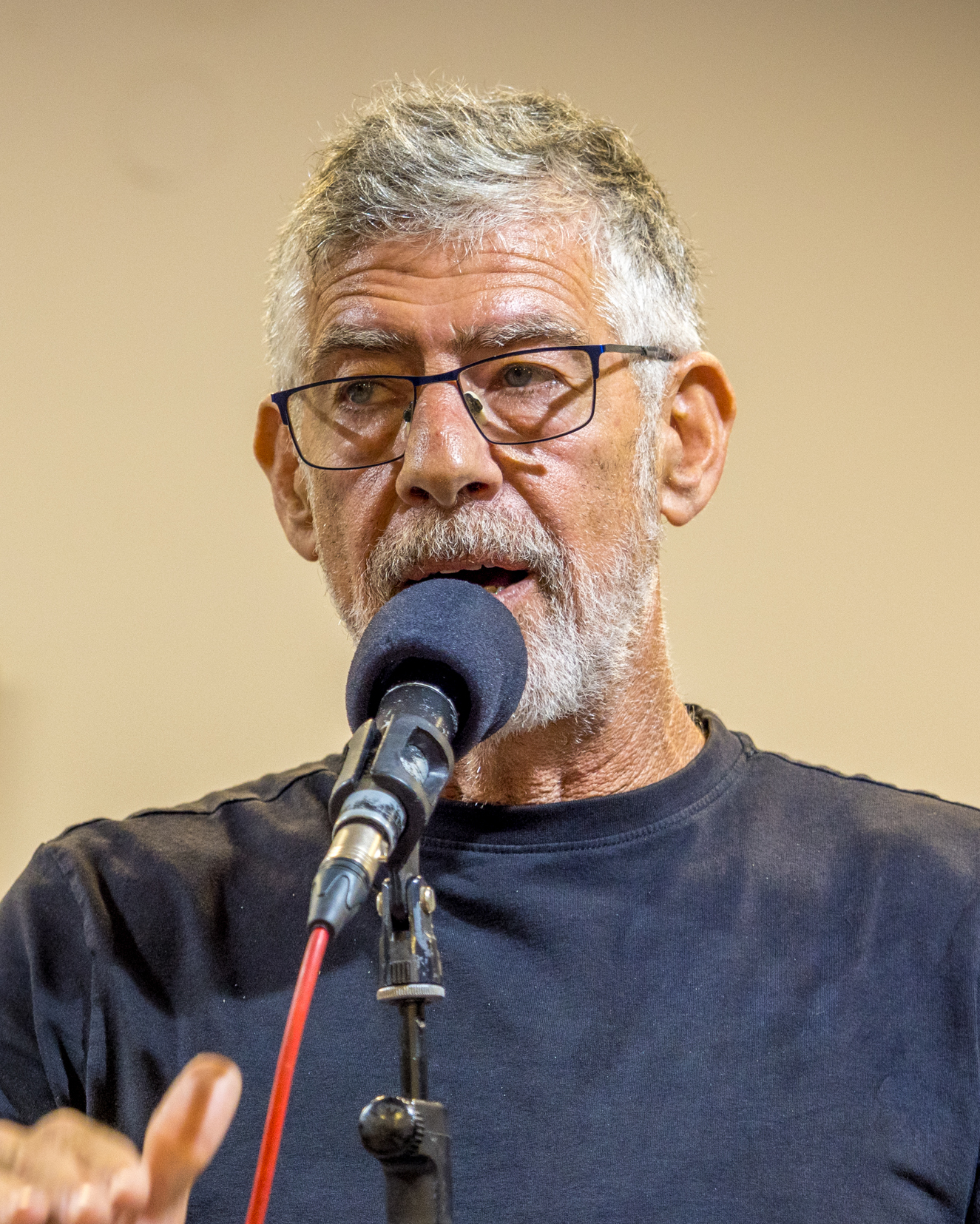

Key Roles
- 2018–2020: CEO of Israel Aerospace Industries

Personal details
- Born: March 16, 1961 (age 65) Kibbutz Alonim, Israel
- Party: Democrats (since 2025)
- Spouse: Haya Yaakovi
- Children: 4
- Education: University of Tel Aviv; Harvard University
- Known for: Air Force service; political activism; social activism; entrepreneurship

Military service
- Allegiance: Israel
- Branch/service: Israel Defense Forces
- Years of service: 1979-2015
- Rank: Aluf (Major general)
- Commands: 253 Squadron; 101 Squadron; Commander of Air Force Operations; Commander of Planning Directorate; Commander of Training at Israeli Air Force; Air Force Chief of Staff

Nimrod Sheffer (Hebrew: נמרוד שפר; born March 16, 1961) is a retired major general in the Israel Defense Forces (IDF) who served in his last position as head of the Planning Department. Sheffer is a fighter pilot who served as Chief of Staff of the Air Force. He served as CEO of Israel Aerospace Industries.

== Biography ==
Sheffer was born and raised in Kibbutz Alonim, the son of Holocaust survivors. He graduated from Carmel Zevulun School.

He enlisted in the Air Force in 1979, completed Flight Course No. 96 in 1981, and was trained as a fighter pilot. He began his career with Squadron 201, and after conversion to the "Netz" aircraft, he served in Squadron 110. From 1984 to 1986, he served as an instructor at the flight school. He served as deputy commander of the 1st Fighter Squadron when it received the first F-16 ("Barak") aircraft in the squadron. In 1994, he was appointed commander of Squadron 253, a KAM squadron, with the rank of lieutenant colonel. Between July 1995 and October 1997, he commanded Squadron 101, a single-seat F-16 squadron. In 1997, he was appointed head of the combat branch in the operations department of the force and was responsible for the operational planning of the fighter aircraft in the Air Force. In 1999, he was promoted to the rank of colonel and appointed head of the operations department of the Air Force. From 2001 to 2004, he commanded Ramon Air Base. In 2005, he was appointed head of the planning division in the planning department of the General Staff, and in March 2008, he was appointed head of the Air Force special training unit. In January 2010, he was appointed chief of staff of the Air Force, deputy and acting commander of the force. In early 2012, he was one of the candidates to replace Ido Nehoshtan as the next commander of the Air Force, a position to which Amir Eshel was ultimately elected. In April 2012, he was appointed head of the Planning Department with the rank of major general, and upon completion of this position, he retired from the IDF.

In January 2018, he was appointed VP of Strategy and Research at Israel Aerospace Industries, and in September 2018, he was appointed CEO of the company. In July 2020, he announced his retirement from the position, effective October of that year.

In April 2025, he announced that he had been removed from volunteering for the reserves following his signing of the "Pilots' Letter".

On May 22, 2025, Sheffer announced his entry into politics and joining the Democratic Party led by Yair Golan. In the primary elections held on July 20, 2026, ahead of the 2026 Israeli legislative election, Sheffer came in at number eleven on the slate.

== Personal life ==
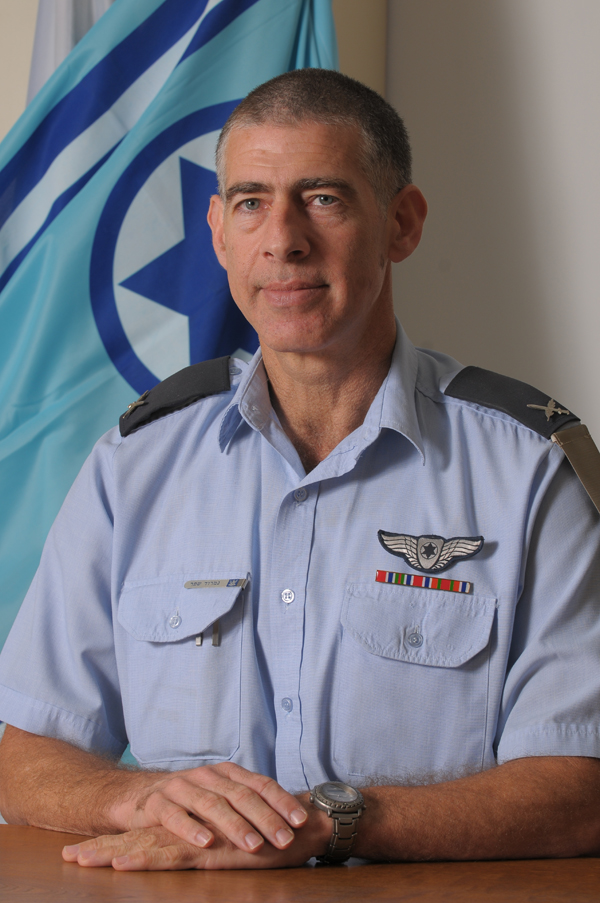
Nimrod Sheffer as an officer in the Air Force

Sheffer holds a BA in Geophysics and Planetary Sciences from Tel Aviv University (1994) and an MA in Public Administration from Harvard University (2005) (as part of the Wexner Foundation Program). He is a graduate of the Air Force Senior Commanders Course at the Institute for Policy and Strategy of the Lauder School of Government at the Interdisciplinary Center Herzliya.

Sheffer is married to Haya, the sister of Brigadier General (ret.) Avi Yaakovi, his fellow pilot course member, and is the father of four.
