= Moran Michel =

Israeli political and social activist

- מורן מישל
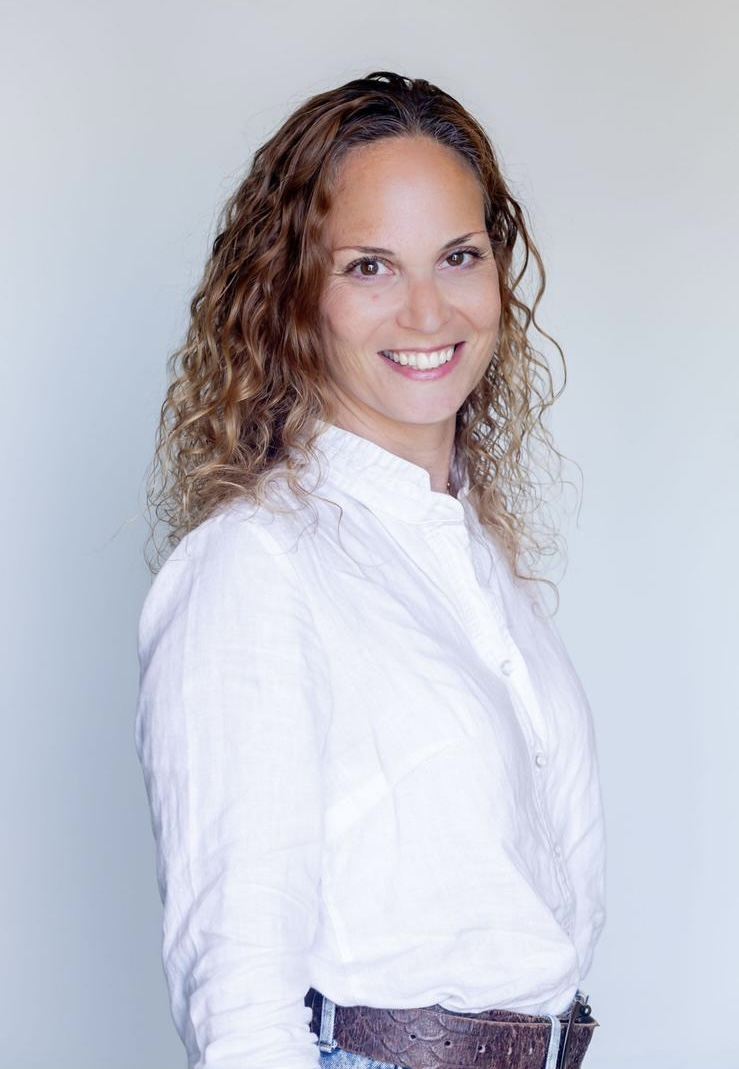
- Born: December 26, 1978 (age 47); Kfar Saba, Israel
- Occupations: producer; content creator
- Known for: social activism; political activism
- Political party: The Democrats (since 2025)

Moran Michel (Hebrew: מורן מישל; born December 26, 1978) is an Israeli producer who is editor-in-chief of docu-series and podcasts. She is an activist in the fields of education, prevention of sexual assault, equality for women and the rights of the self-employed and one of the leaders of the protest against the judicial reform and the "Elections Now" protest. She is a member of the board and one of the founders of the "Ogen La'itid" (Anchor for the Future) movement.

== Early life ==
Michel was born and raised in Kfar Saba. She graduated from Katznelson High School in the city. From 1997 to 1999, she served in the IDF as an operations officer in Company 914 of the Navy, and was discharged with the rank of lieutenant.

She studied design and film at Escola College.

== Career ==
From 2012 to 2018, Michel was a content editor and community manager for the content website Salona, leading community and commercial projects. She mainly dealt with issues related to feminism, equality, politics, violence against women, and the advancement of women. In this context, she led a women's running community and served as an Adidas sponsored athlete.

From 2016 to 2017, she was the founder and CEO of the Federation of Independents.

Since 2020, she has worked as the director of intra-organizational community projects at Microsoft Israel, where she established and managed an education community and sports and personal development communities for employees.

After "Gallant Night" in March 2023, she left her job to increase her activist-political activities. Shortly thereafter, she was appointed VP of Mr. D Labs, and was one of the founders of the "Starting a New Path" association, where she served as CEO and content manager.

== Political protest activity ==
In 2011, Michel participated in the social justice protest in Israel. She was one of the leaders of the struggle for the rights of the self-employed, as the head of the women's cell of the "Self-employed Make a Change" movement, which was established in 2015 following an article by Gal Gabbay, and she also founded the Federation of Self-Employed Organizations and served as its co-CEO. She was among the leaders of the amendment to the Maternity Allowances for Self-Employed Women Law, which passed the Knesset in 2016, with former MKs Tali Ploskov (Kulanu) and Aliza Lavie (Yesh Atid).

In July 2023, she was among the initiators and leaders of the protest march from Tel Aviv to Jerusalem - a mass march held in protest of the cancellation of the "reasonability clause".

After the October 7 massacre, she was one of the founders of the volunteer organization "Civil Mourning Day" in which various civic initiatives were formed, including the "Day of Civilian Mourning" to mark 30 days since the massacre and the "Awake Mother" movement, a movement of mothers of combatants and soldiers.

Since 2023, Michel has been one of the leaders of the protest against the judicial reform, as part of a coalition of grassroots groups, civic movements and protest organizations. Since the outbreak of the Gaza war, she has been leading the main protest stage and is one of the regular speakers at the demonstrations.

In February 2024, Michel was trampled by a police horse during a demonstration. As a result of the injury, she was diagnosed with a fractured foot. In May 2024, during a demonstration for the release of the kidnapped hostages, she was injured by a direct hit from a water cannon and was taken to the hospital after losing consciousness. Following the incident, she testified before the Knesset's Special Committee on Youth Affairs in a hearing convened by the committee's chair, MK Naama Lazimi, which dealt with police violence.

In 2025, she was one of the founders of the social movement "Anchor for the Future". The movement's goal is to be an ideological engine for the liberal camp in Israel by formulating a vision based on shared values for different communities, and taking civic responsibility for building a reformed Israeli society.

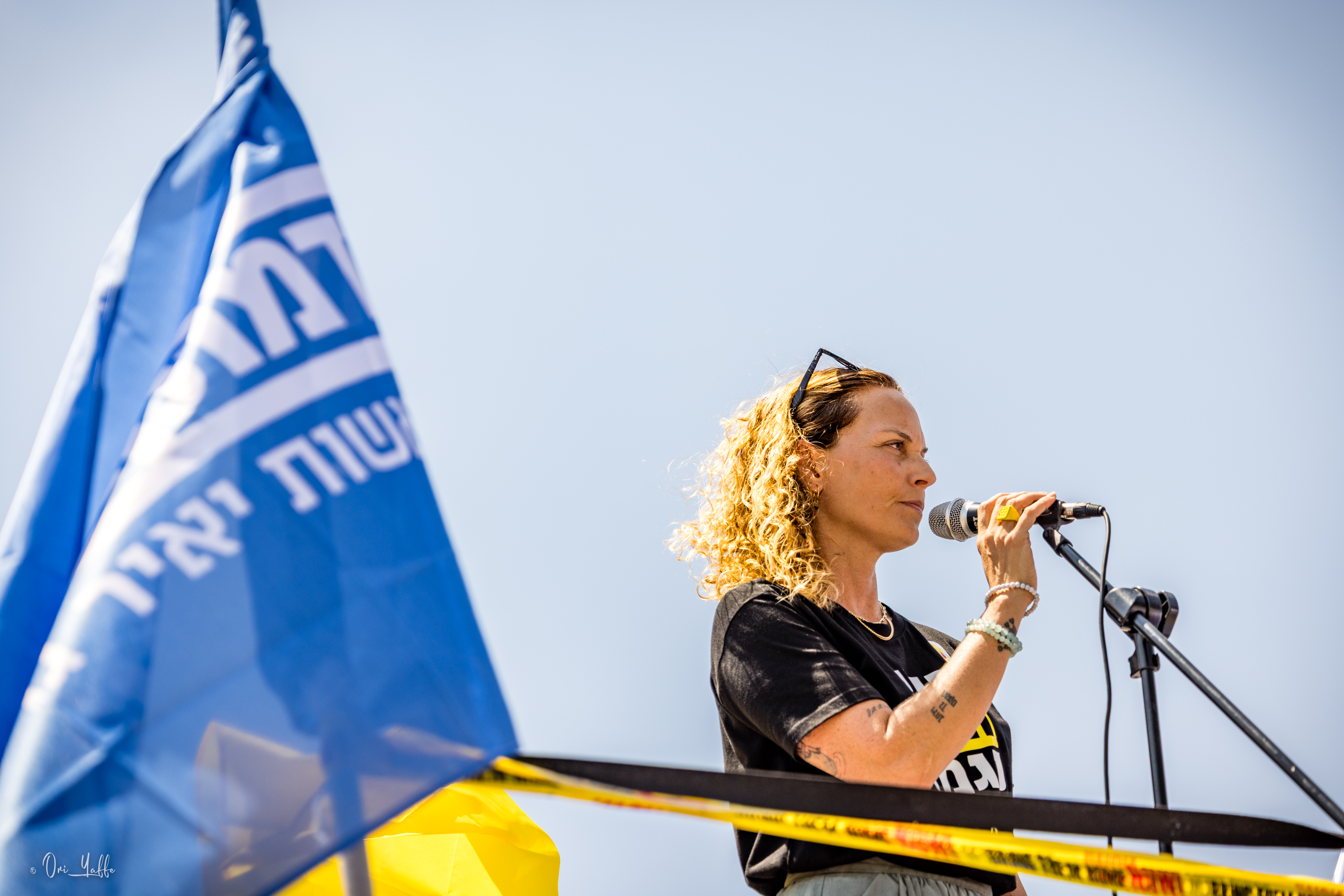
Michel speaking at a demonstration in August 2025

In August 2025, Michel announced her joining the Democratic Party and her candidacy for the party's primaries ahead of the upcoming legislative election. In The Democrats primary elections held on July 20, 2026, ahead of the 2026 Israeli legislative election, Michel came in at number twenty one on the slate.

== Advocacy ==
In 1995, Michel was sexually assaulted by a diving instructor during advanced training. Two years later, after it became clear that other women and girls had been assaulted by the same instructor in the past, she filed an official complaint with the police. Michel served as a key witness in the trial. In 2001, the attacker was sentenced to nine months in prison. His appeal was rejected. With the rise of the Me Too movement, she became publicly active on the issue.

In August 2020, after a gang rape in Eilat, she was part of a group of women who initiated demonstrations across the country and formed the basis for the establishment of the "Women Building an Alternative" movement.

== Media career ==
Michel is the editor-in-chief of a series of docu-series with a political and historical slant. Among the series:

- Calculated Risk – Following the book "The Road to October 7" by Adam Raz.
- Enemy Without Borders – The Iranian Nuclear Threat
- The Age of Annexation – in collaboration with the Berl Katznelson Foundation
- Qatargate – On Qatar's influence in the Middle East and the affair of the connection between Netanyahu's office and the Qatari government
- The Oslo Paradox – Debunking Myths About the Oslo Accords, in collaboration with the Mold Institute

== Podcasts ==
In 2025, she was among the hosts of the program "The Truth Machine" in its second season.

== Social initiatives ==
- No One Will Come (2018) – A social running community to get to know and love the country through its trails, currently includes over 3,000 runners.
- One Family, Two Homes – A personal column on the Ynet website encouraging couples in divorce proceedings to choose a healthy separation process that is beneficial to preserving the peace of their children.

== Personal life ==
Michel lives in Kfar Saba with her partner. She is a mother of five daughters.
