= Netali Shem Tov =

Israeli newscaster and politician

- נטעלי שם טוב

Personal details
- Born: 29 June 1983 (age 43) Kiryat Shmona, Israel
- Party: Amcha Yisrael
- Children: 2
- Education: Open University of Israel; Tel Aviv University

Netali Shem Tov (Hebrew: נטעלי שם טוב) is an Israeli newscaster and politician, where she once worked for Channel 13 and later entered politics by joining Amcha Yisrael.

== Early life ==
Netali Shem Tov was born in Kiryat Shmona and raised in Metula. She completed her military service in the IDF Spokesperson's Unit, and was discharged with the rank of captain. She graduated with honors with a BA in communications from the Open University of Israel and then a MA with honors in political communications from Tel Aviv University.

== Career ==
=== Journalism ===
In October 2020, Shem Tov made a news report revealing an incident where a female IDF soldier was denied participation in a workshop due to an allegedly inappropriate image on Whatsapp. The IDF later announced the approval of the workshop for the soldier.

In 2023, she began working at Channel 13 as a news program host.

In April 2025, Shem Tov participated in an Independence Day ceremony in Mount Herzl, with former hostage Eli Sharabi also in attendance.

In September 2025, Shem Tov was fired from her position in Channel 13 following mutual allegations of abuse between her and the news company. After she filed a lawsuit against the company, Shem Tov later alleged that the company agreed to a settlement of 3.5 million shekels, although the company denied this claim.

On 13 May 2026, Shem Tov attended a national conference hosted by president Isaac Herzog which aimed to "rebuild trust" and "strengthen social cohesion" amidst internal division in the country.

=== Politics ===
On 25 August 2026, Amcha Yisrael was officially launched with Shem Tov announced as a member on the party list ahead of the 2026 election.

== Personal life ==
Shem Tov lives in Metula with her spouse and two children.

In August 2025, Shem Tov revealed that burglars broke into her house one night.
