= Avi Dabush =

Israeli rabbi and politician activist

- אבי דבוש
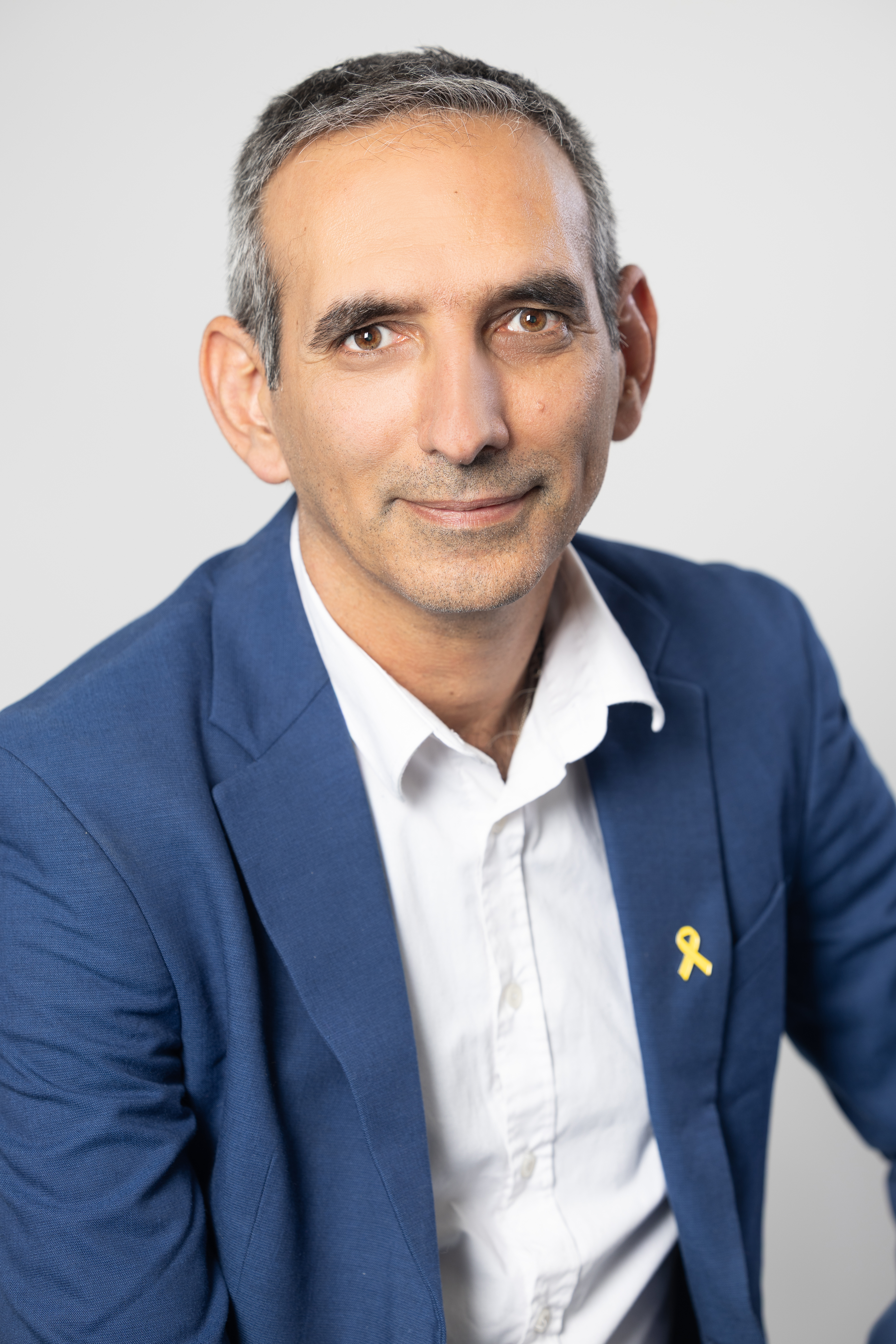
- Dabush in 2025

Personal life
- Born: 8 March 1976 (age 50) Ashkelon, Israel
- Children: 2
- Political party: Meretz (2014–2024); Democrats (since 2024)

Religious life
- Religion: Judaism

Jewish leader
- Position: Executive director
- Organisation: Rabbis for Human Rights
- Began: 2019

Avi Dabush (Hebrew: אבי דבוש; born 8 March 1976) is an Israeli rabbi, peace activist, and politician. He is the executive director of Rabbis for Human Rights.

== Early and personal life ==
Dabush was born to a Syrian-Jewish mother and Libyan-Jewish father, and raised in Ashkelon in an Orthodox Jewish family that "right-wing family that idolized Begin and voted for the National Religious Party". Growing up, the schools he attended "emphasized Jews’ biblical ties to Judea and Samaria". He was involved in the Bnei Akiva youth movement. After graduating high school, he studied "at a far-right yeshiva". There, he began to grow disconnected from both Orthodox Judaism and the politics he had grown up with, especially due to the yeshiva's opposition to the Oslo Accords. Having grown up visiting Gaza City until the First Intifada, Dabush became increasingly uncomfortable with how the right-wing treated Palestinians.

Dabush has lived in the Gaza envelope since 2008. Dabush has lived in the kibbutz of Bror Hayil, where he founded a "Social Action Beit Midrash", and in Sderot. He was living in the kibbutz of Nirim when it was attacked on October 7, 2023. He, his wife, their two children, and their dog hid in a shelter near their home for eight hours until they were evacuated by the IDF. He and his family were evacuated to Eilat and have since moved to Beersheba, and are unsure when or if they can return to Nirim.

Dabush considers himself a humanistic non-denominational rabbi.

== Career and activism ==
Dabush's early activism focused on environmental issues; when he was 26, he campaigned against a proposal to add another coal unit to Ashkelon's power plant.

By the early 2010s, Dabush was a community organizer for the New Israel Fund. He later became the programs director for Shatil, the NIF's action wing in Israel. In 2014, he was a co-founder of the Movement for the Future of the Western Negev.

Dabush has run for a Knesset position as part of Meretz, a left-wing Israeli party. His work in the party focused on increasing leftist support among communities and development towns in southern Israel. He founded the party's "periphery office", which aims to connect leftist politicians with "the forgotten constituencies in rural neighborhoods". In 2018, he ran unsuccessfully for the party's leadership.

Dabush has been the executive director of Rabbis for Human Rights since 2019 and is a member of A Land for All. As part of his work with Rabbis for Human Rights, Dabush has participated in planting olive trees and helping Palestinian farmers with protecting their olive harvests in the West Bank.

He has published The Periphery Rebellion (Pardes Publishing House), a memoir and analysis of "the relations between Israel’s center and its periphery".

As a student at the Shalom Hartman Institute, Dabush provided spiritual support for individuals whose relatives are being held hostage in the Gaza Strip as part of the Gaza war.

=== Political positions ===
Dabush believes that the security of Israel goes hand in hand with the protection of Palestinians' human rights. He has stated that he is "against occupation [of the West Bank] because this is a root of so many violations of human rights". In 2021, he protested against the continued Isaeli blockade of the Gaza Strip.

Dabush has advocated for a ceasefire in the Gaza war and has criticized "very deep and radical dehumanising from both sides". He has also spoken out against the inhumane treatment of Palestinian prisoners by Israelis, calling it "a clear violation of Judaism" and noting that "even if we judge these soldiers, it won’t solve the problem without leaders and a system making clear that this is simply unacceptable".

In January 2026, he addressed the Knesset's National Security Committee to oppose the bill providing for the death penalty for terrorists. He declared ″I can understand the emotions, including feelings of revenge. But this proposal existed even before October 7. It is simply exploiting those emotions - and in my view, exploiting them cynically.″

In The Democrats primary elections held on July 20, 2026, ahead of the 2026 Israeli legislative election, Dabush came in at number thirteen on the slate.
