= Nava Rozolyo =

Israeli lawyer and social activist

- נאווה רוזוליו
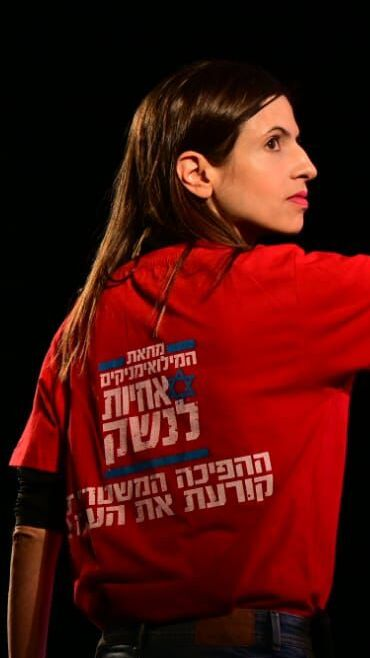
- Rozolyo in 2025
- Born: June 17, 1986 (age 40); Jerusalem, Israel
- Occupation: lawyer
- Known for: social activism
- Political party: The Democrats

Nava Rozolyo (Hebrew: נאווה רוזוליו; born June 17, 1986) is an Israeli lawyer and social activist. She is a prominent figure in the ongoing protests against Benjamin Netanyahu and the thirty-seventh government of Israel. She is the founder of the online group "Shame Brigades" (aka Shame Patrols) which she established as part of the protests against judicial reform.

== Biography ==
=== Early life and education ===
Nava Rozolyo was born in Jerusalem on June 17, 1986 and raised in a religious zionist family. She is the eldest of four children. In an interview for Haaretz, Rozolyo stated that she has always seen herself as a critical thinker. Rozolyo attended Pelech High School in Jerusalem, graduating in 2004. She says that she started to question religion at age sixteen and eventually turned away from religion. She became acquainted with secular life during her army service. She subsequently completed her mandatory military service in the Israel Defense Forces, serving in intelligence and operations command roles in the Jordan Valley Brigade from 2005 to 2007, followed by a period of permanent service in the brigade's operations command center in 2007.

She studied at the Hebrew University of Jerusalem, where she started to lead a secular lifestyle, earning a combined bachelor's degree in law and a BA in accounting between 2009 and 2013. She later completed an accounting completion program at the College of Management Academic Studies in 2014, qualifying as both an attorney and a certified public accountant in Israel. In 2018, she completed professional training as a Pilates instructor at Campus Siim, Tel Aviv University.

=== Protest activities ===
Rozolyo began her protest activities at the "Balfour Protests" during the COVID pandemic throughout 2020 and 2021. Rozolyo stated that it was there that she discovered that one can become an active member of society and that she had not even taken part in elections until then. She started to investigate further about "The Submarine Scandal" and it became evident to her that Netanyahu was sacrificing Israel's security for his own personal benefit.

On March 1, 2023, following justice minister, Yariv Levin's declaration of judicial reforms, Rozolyo founded the online group called "Shame Brigades" (משמרות הבושה) and has since organized, at times at a moment's notice, via various communication channels, protests at the homes and leisure venues of government ministers, amassing huge crowds of people as part of the judicial reform protests. That day, word broke out that Sara Netanyahu was in a barber shop in Tel-Aviv. Rozolyo organized an impromptu protest and began shouting at her from outside the barber shop via megaphone. She realized that the protest is much more affective when addressed directly to public officials and their affiliates in public spaces. Rozolyo has stated that the goal of her protests is to dismantle the thirty-seventh government of Israel, to have some of its presiding members tried and imprisoned, and to establish a new government and restore democracy in Israel.

Rozolyo is a frequent representative of the protesters against the judicial reform at Knesset commissions.

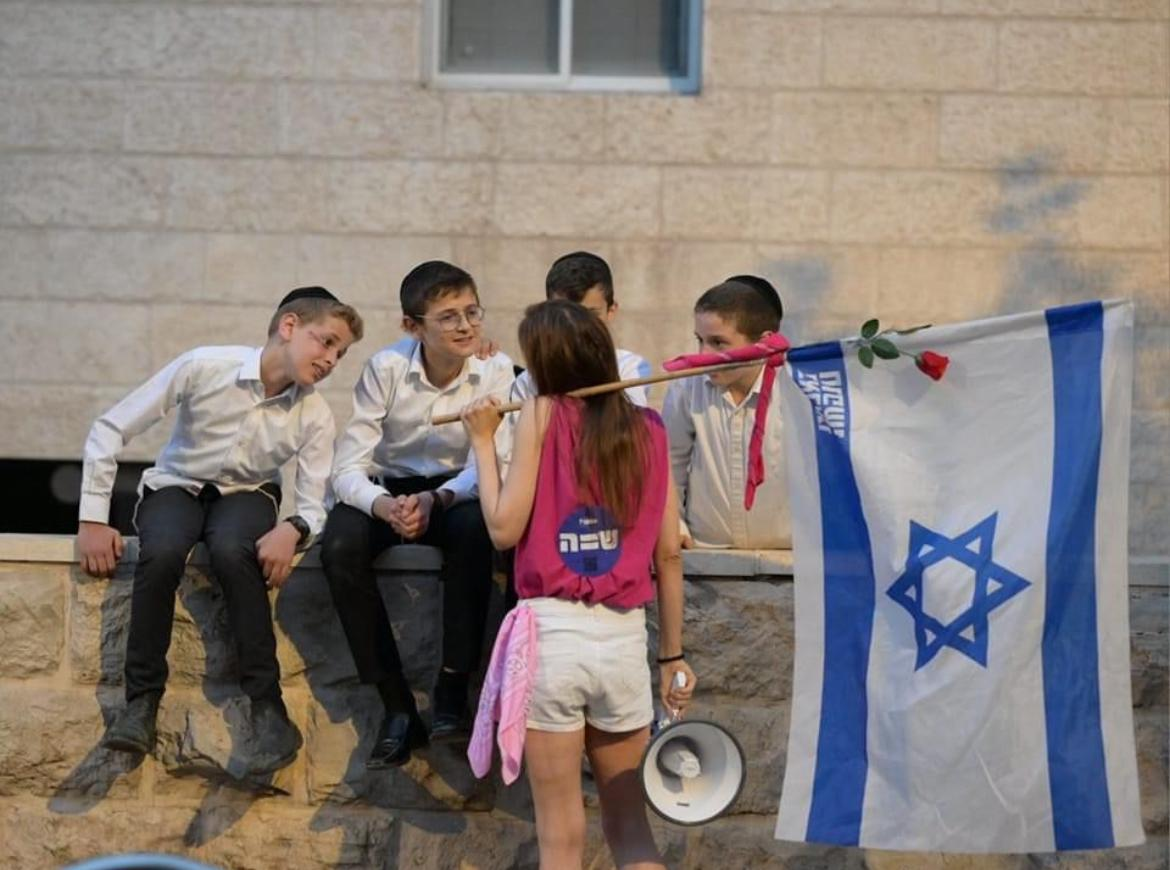
Rozolyo during a protest on Gaza Street in Jerusalem near the Prime Minister's residence, 2023

In November 2024, it was claimed by Channel 14 that Rozolyo stated that she has appealed to the International Criminal Court in The Hague to "speed up" the arrest warrants for Netanyahu. Rozolyo refuted the claim as false and that she never turned to the International Criminal Court but said that the protest movement's additional role is to get the international community to act against the government.

In March 2025, Rozolyo organized a protest at the grand opening of a train station in Jerusalem which was attended by Transport Minister, Miri Regev, and Prime Minister Benjamin Netanyahu.

=== Legal proceedings ===
In 2024, Rozolyo and other protest members filed a 2.4 million shekel lawsuit against Yinon Magal for publicizing their personal phone numbers, breach of privacy, harassment, and slandering.

In May 2024, Yair Netanyahu filed a motion for a restraining order against Rozolyo, claiming that she posed a risk to his personal safety. The motion was denied by the court.

In March 2025, Sara Netanyahu, wife of Prime Minister Benjamin Netanyahu, filed for a restraining order against Rozolyo and journalist Uri Misgav stating that the two "posed a real threat" to her life. In her defense, Rozolyo stated that the only time she came face-to-face with Netanyahu was when the two met at the judicial hearing and that her protest activities are non-violent and legal. The restraining order was later reversed later in May of that year.

That same month, the court dismissed a libel suit against Rozolyo filed by Shmulik Silman, husband of Environment Minister, Idit Silman, in regards to a tweet by Rozolyo calling to protest against the Silmans at the airport.

In April 2025, the head of the Shin Bet, Ronen Bar, in affidavit to the Supreme Court, cited Rozolyo as one of the protest activists which he was asked to "take care of" by Prime Minister Benjamin Netanyahu.

In May 2025 during his trial, Benjamin Netanyahu testified that he had filed a lawsuit against Rozolyo.

== Political activity ==
In June 2026, Rozolyo announced that she is joining The Democrats party led by Yair Golan. In the primary elections held on July 20, 2026, ahead of the 2026 Israeli legislative election, Rozolyo came in at number sixteen on the slate.
