= Chen Arieli =

Israeli politician

- חן אריאלי
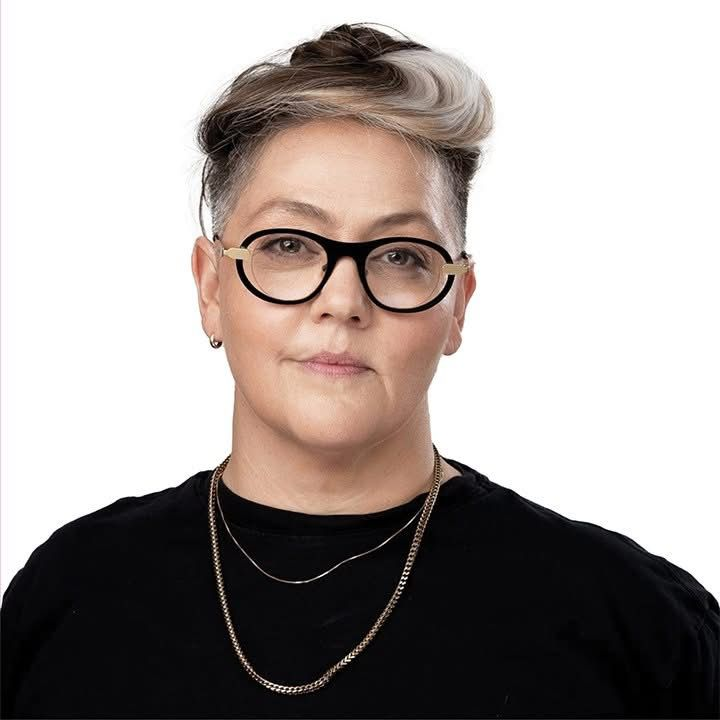
- Chen Arieli, July 2025

Deputy Mayor at Tel Aviv-Yafo Municipality
- Incumbent
- Assumed office April 2019

Personal details
- Born: 9 July 1976 (age 50) Haifa, Israel
- Party: Labor

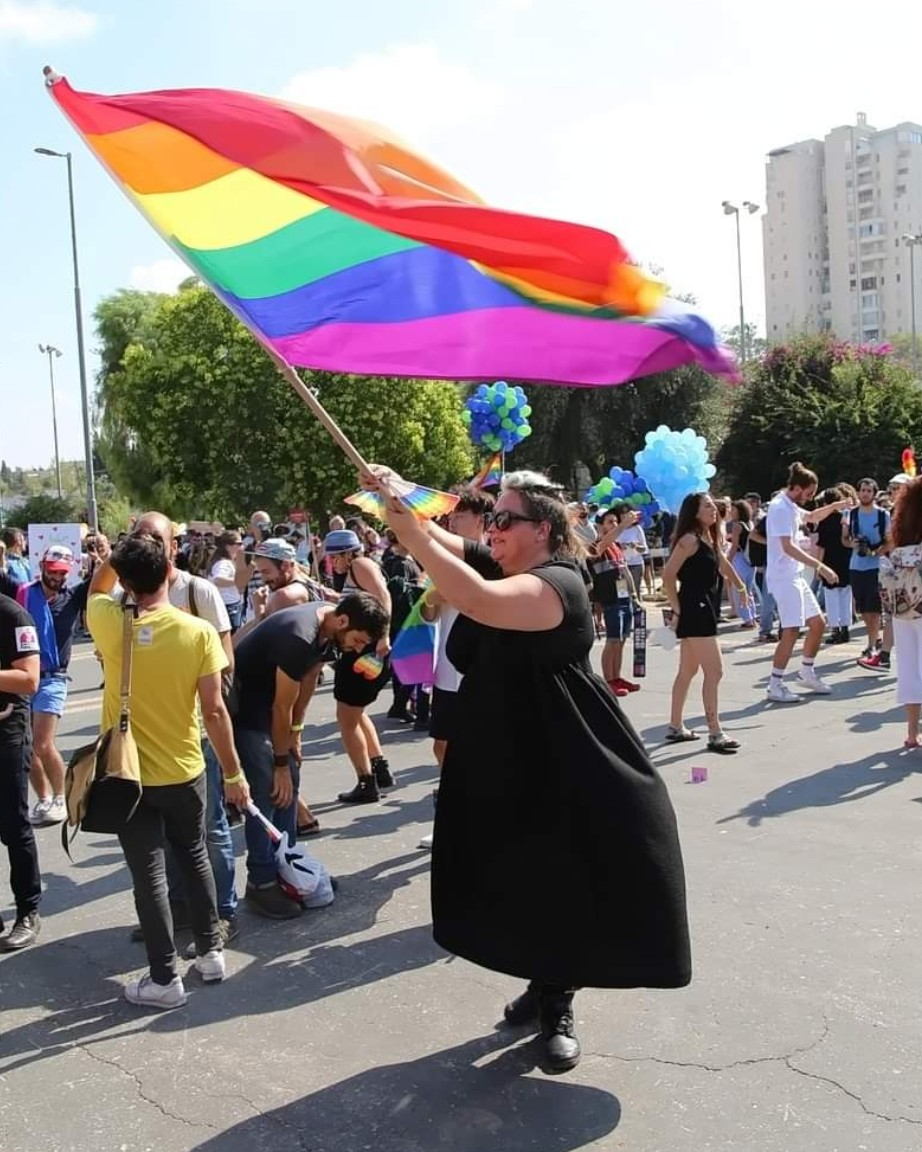
Arieli at a Pride Protest

Chen Arieli (Hebrew: חן אריאלי) is the Deputy Mayor of Tel Aviv-Yafo Municipality. In charge of the welfare and public health administration in the city. Arieli is the first openly lesbian woman to hold the Deputy Mayor position in Tel Aviv-Yafo. She joined politics after 20 years of working in civil society. Arieli defines herself as a feminist.

Chen Arieli was born on July 9, 1976, and raised in Haifa to Dan and Leah, a sister to Orly Zarfati and Ran Arieli.

== Activism ==
=== LGBTQ rights ===
Arieli has been active in the LGBTQIA+ rights. Prior to becoming Deputy Mayor, Arieli was Chair of The Aguda – Israel's LGBT Task Force.

Arieli helped produced TLVFest, an annual film festival held in Tel Aviv, focusing on LGBT themed film from around the world. Arieli also helped produce Lethal Lesbian, Israel's only lesbian film festival.

In 2013, Arieli was a partner in the “Gay Literature” project which added a dedicated shelf of LGBT literature to libraries in the Tel Aviv-Yafo Municipality.

Arieli served as Chair of The Aguda – Israel's LGBT Task Force for two terms between 2015 and 2019. Arieli served as Joint Chair of the Task Force from 2015 to 2016 together with Omri Calman. In June 2016, Arieli and Calman threatened to cancel the annual Tel Aviv Pride Parade over inequity in fiscal support for LGBT causes from the Israeli Government. As a result, the Israeli Government increased the budget for LGBTQ community organizations to a record 10 million NIS.

In July 2017, Arieli led a protest against discrimination of same-sex couples in the adoption process opposite the Tel Aviv Government Complex with thousands of participants.

In July 2018, Arieli led street protests against Israel's anti-gay surrogacy laws, among other issues. The protests ended with a rally in Rabin Square with the participation of over 100,000 people.

In October 2018, Arieli initiated the "Pride Platform," a project training member of the LGBT community to run in local elections and encouraging Israeli political parties to increase LGBT representation.

=== Women's rights ===
She is also one of the founders of the Committee for the Advancement of Women in the Community at the Gay Urban Center.

Arieli is a member of the Public Council of the Itach-Maaki Women Lawyers for Social Justice and a member of the Executive Committee of Matzmichim - The Israeli Violence Reduction Organization. She represents the Tel Aviv Municipality on the Board of Directors of the Tel Aviv Museum of Art and of “Ahuzot Hahof," a municipal company owned by the Tel Aviv the municipality, which has been operating parking lots throughout Tel Aviv.

== Political work ==
Arieli is the first openly gay Deputy Mayor of Tel Aviv-Yafo, responsible for the social services portfolio. The role addresses LGBTQ issues, including challenges faced by transgender people and other issues raised by the 2018 protest.

During the 19th Knesset (2013-2015), Arieli served as a Spokesperson and Political Advisor to Merav Michaeli of the Labor Party, in the liberal democratic wing.

== Personal life ==
Arieli is in a relationship with Halit Levy, a female documentary filmmaker. The two live in Jaffa.
