= The Democrats (Israel) =

Israeli political party

The Democrats הדמוקרטים الديمقراطيون
- Chair: Yair Golan
- Founders: Yair Golan; Tomer Reznik
- Founded: 18 March 2024; 2 years ago
- Merger of: Israeli Labor Party; Meretz
- Headquarters: Tel Aviv, Israel
- Membership (2026): 112,376
- Ideology: Social democracy; Liberal Zionism (Note: The Democrats were founded by the merger of two labor Zionist parties, Israeli Labor Party and Meretz, but The Democrats define themselves as "liberal-democratic Zionist", not officially "labor Zionist".)
- Political position: Centre-left to left-wing
- European affiliation: Party of European Socialists (observer)
- International affiliation: Socialist International; Progressive Alliance
- Colours: Blue
- Slogan: האומץ לשנות באמת ('The courage to truly change')
- Knesset: 8 / 120

Election symbol
- אמת أ‌م‌ت

Website
- democrats.org.il

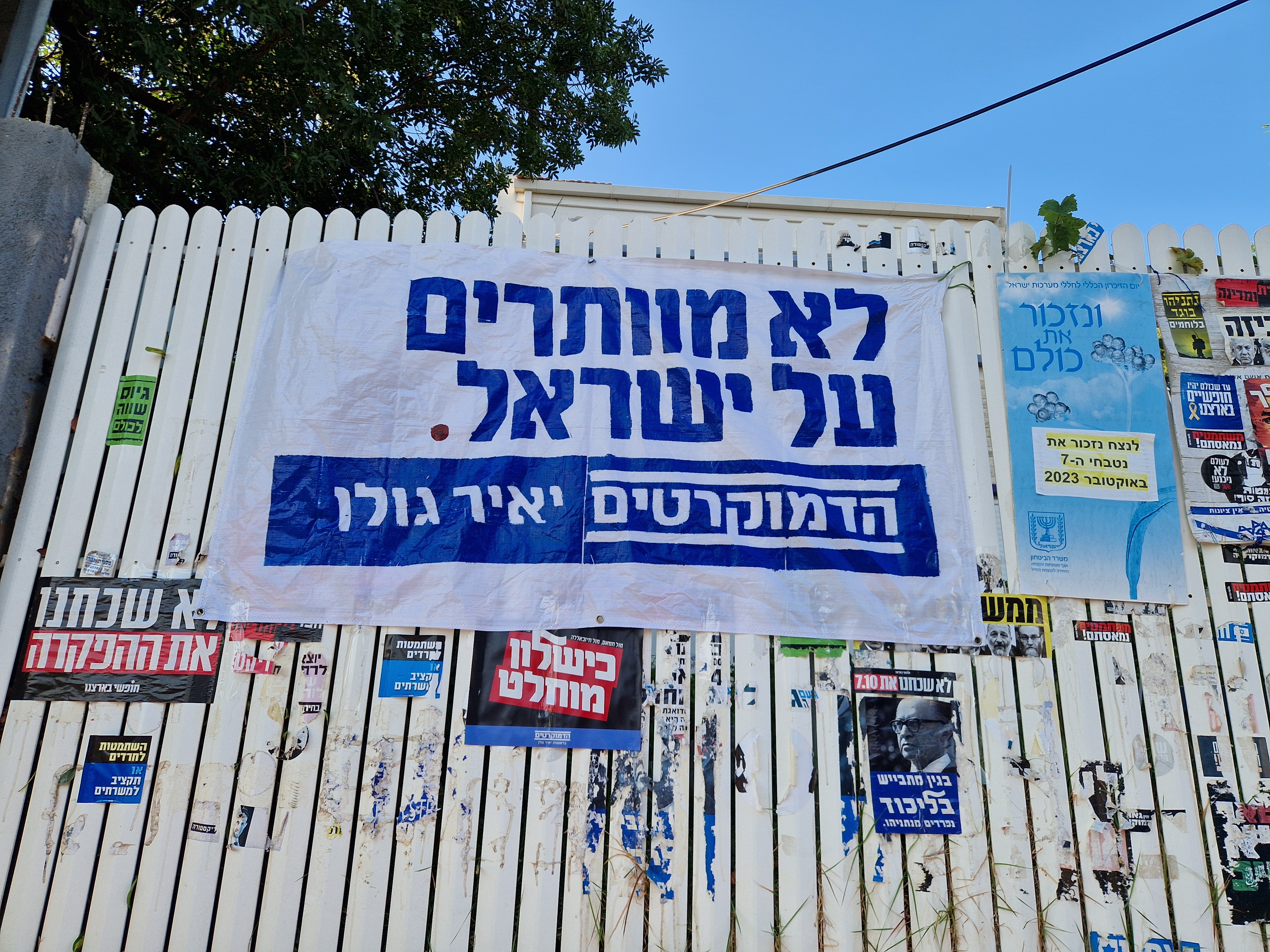
A "No Giving Up on Israel" sign on a fence at a house in Nesher

The Democrats (Hebrew: הדמוקרטים, romanized: HaDemokratim, officially: The Democrats Party – Founded by the Labor Movement, Hebrew: מפלגת הדמוקרטים – מיסודה של תנועת העבודה, romanized: Mifleget HaDemokratim – Miyesoda shel Tnu'at Ha'Avoda), is a social democratic and Zionist political party in Israel, formed by the merger of the centre-left Israeli Labor Party and the left-wing Meretz party in July 2024. It is led by Yair Golan, a former IDF Deputy Chief of Staff who led the Labor Party before the merger and had served as an MK for the Democratic Union before joining Meretz. The Democrats describes itself as "the political home of the liberal-democratic camp in Israel", and as a part of what Golan calls the "Zionist left". The party won eight seats in the 2026 Israeli legislative election.

== History ==
=== Background ===
In the 2022 Israeli legislative election, the left-wing Meretz party won 3.16% of the vote failing, for the first time, to pass the electoral threshold (3.25%) required to qualify for seats in the Knesset, while the Labor Party just managed to pass, with 3.69% of the vote, winning four seats, its worst ever performance in terms of popular vote. Labor leader Merav Michaeli was criticized for having refused to enter into an electoral pact with Meretz as the party's loss contributed to Benjamin Netanyahu's victory in the election.

Negotiations began between Labor and Meretz following the 2022 election, with Meretz party secretary general Tomer Reznik and former Meretz MK Michal Rozin heading negotiations on behalf of their party and Labor MKs Gilad Kariv and Naama Lazimi in charge of the negotiations for Labor, with Yair Golan joining the negotiations later.

Polling conducted throughout 2023 and in 2024, in the months prior to Labor's leadership election, suggested that in the 2026 Israeli legislative election Labor may fail to pass the threshold and be shut out of the Knesset, while Meretz was projected to narrowly pass the threshold and win four seats. Polls taken in June prior to the merger agreement projected that if the parties were to run together, they would win more than ten seats.

Golan launched his leadership campaign for Labor in early March 2024 on a platform of uniting Labor, Meretz, and other organizations. He announced the formation of "The Democrats" on 18 March 2024, citing a need for a "democratic, free, broad-based party", that would "present a... Zionist alternative" to the Netanyahu government, and called for an early Knesset election. Golan was elected Labor leader in a "landslide victory" on 28 May 2024.

=== Merger ===
On 30 June, the two parties jointly announced that they had agreed to a merger. Under the merger agreement, there will be one Meretz representative in every four spots on the new party's electoral list, as well as on the party bodies, and there will also be representation for Meretz's municipal factions. Golan has said that the party aims to be a "broad home for the liberal-democratic public in Israel". Golan will receive two seats in the top ten slots. The representation agreement will be in effect only for the next election; the party's electoral slate and members of representative bodies will be chosen by party primaries. The agreement designated Labor Party leader Yair Golan as leader and chairman of the new party.

A convention of delegates from Labor and Meretz and of the 2023 Israeli judicial reform protests approved the merger on 12 July 2024 in Tel Aviv. Under the agreement, Meretz and Labor continue as separate corporate and budgetary entities, and their factions in the Histadrut, municipal councils, and other bodies outside the Knesset will not merge at this stage, but will cooperate. Despite the merger, members of The Democrats continue to be identified in the 25th Knesset as members of the Israeli Labor Party because Ofir Katz, the chairman of the Knesset House Committee, and other members of the government coalition sitting on the committee, refused to agree to formally rename the Knesset faction in February 2025.

The party announced in late May 2026 that its members had voted to "ratify" the agreement at a 31 May meeting in Tel Aviv. This also included setting aside the sixth, eighth and fourteenth seats on the party's 2026 electoral list for Meretz members.

=== 2026 campaign ===
Golan announced in January 2026 that numerous protest leaders, including Ami Dror, Moshe Radman, and Gaby Lasky, had joined the party. The following month, Omri Ronen, one of the leaders of Brothers and Sisters in Arms, also joined the party. In May 2026, Golan announced that Moran Zer Katzenstein, founder of Women Building an Alternative (Bonot Alternativa), had joined the party. In June 2026, it was announced that prominent protest leader Nava Rozolyo joined the party.

On 20 June 2026, the Democrats held an online primary election to select the party's electoral list for the 2026 Israeli legislative election. All registered party members were eligible to vote for between six and eight candidates from a field of 51. Of the party's 112,376 registered members, approximately 97,000 participated in the primary. Golan, who was elected party leader in 2024, was guaranteed first place on the list and was not included in the primary election. It was reported that the turnout of the primary election reached a "record 86 percent."

The party won eight seats.

== Policies ==
=== Character of the nation-state ===
The party supports repealing the Nation State Bill, a Basic Law that enshrines Israel's status as a Jewish state, on the grounds that it is discriminatory towards non-Jews.

=== Israel–Palestine conflict ===
The party supports a two-state solution to the Israeli–Palestinian conflict. Yair Golan states The Democrats is the only Zionist party which opposes the Israeli occupation of the West Bank. Golan said the Palestinian Authority would be integral to governing Gaza the "day after". The party agreement mentions that "rebuilding Gaza is an Israeli interest". Golan also opposed the occupation and settlement of the Gaza Strip, saying "it will cost us in hostages and soldiers' blood". The party has several Arab-Israeli prominent members, such as Ilhab Shalian and Somaya Bashir.

=== Judiciary ===
The party opposes the 2023 Israeli judicial reform. The party's merger agreement states: "We will fight for a full and substantial democracy ... which will include protection of individual rights and minority rights ... we will uphold the full separation of powers, prevent abuses by government institutions, and safeguard the judicial independence."

=== Economy ===
The party supports social democratic policies, such as affordable housing, equal opportunities, welfare state, strengthening of trade unions, and opposition to privatization of public sectors such as healthcare and education.

== Leaders ==
Leader	Took office	Left office
Yair Golan	12 July 2024	Incumbent

== Election results ==
=== Knesset ===
Election	Leader	Votes	%	Seats	+/−	Government
2026	Yair Golan	366,278	6.44 (#5)	8 / 120	New	TBA

== Knesset members ==
Knesset	Members	Seats
25th (2024–2026)	Merav Michaeli, Naama Lazimi, Gilad Kariv, Efrat Rayten (Note: The Democrats' members sat in the 25th Knesset as members of the Israeli Labor Party.)	4 / 120
26th (2026-present)	Yair Golan, Naama Lazimi, Gilad Kariv, Efrat Rayten, Yaya Fink, Gaby Lasky, Omri Ronen, Michal Rozin	8 / 120

== See also ==
Left-liberal alliances & parties:

Israel

- 1965–1968 and 1969–1991: Alignment, political alliances centred around Labor that included Meretz's predecessors Mapam and (briefly) Ratz
- 1991–2001: One Israel, centre-left political alliance
- 2015–2018: Zionist Union, centre-left political alliance
- 2019–2020: Democratic Union, left-wing political alliance
- 2019–2020: Labor-Gesher, electoral list
- 2020: Labor-Gesher-Meretz, centre-left electoral list

World

- List of major liberal parties considered left
