= Moshe Radman =

Israeli entrepeneur, investor and activist

Moshe Radman Abutbul
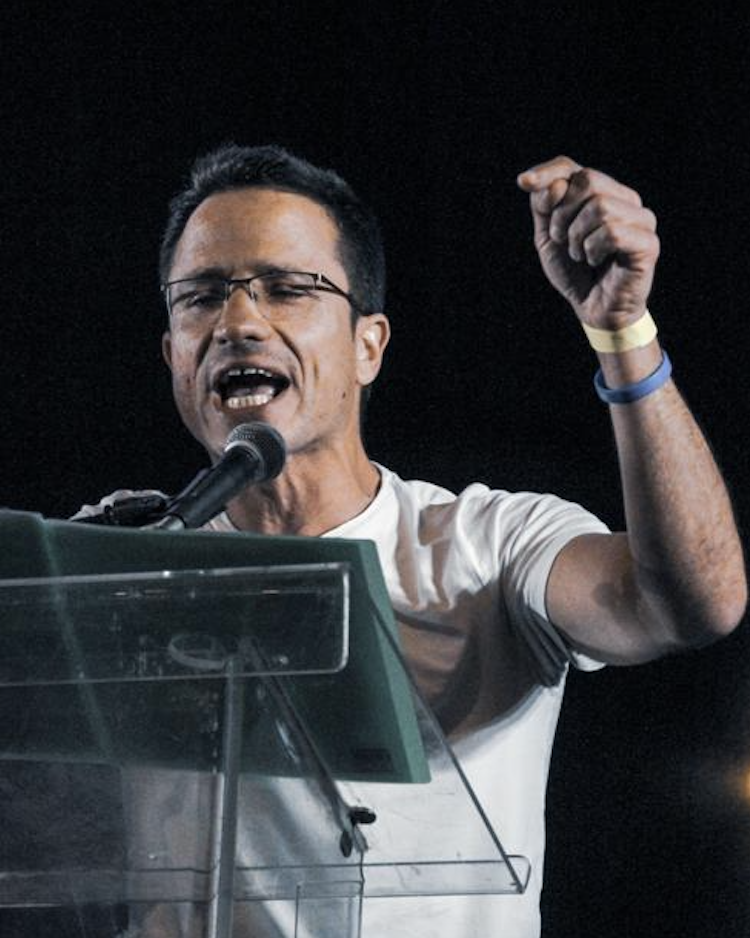
- Born: משה רדמן; 6 October 1984 (age 42); Lod, Israel
- Education: Bar-Ilan University; Tel Aviv University
- Occupations: high-tech entrepreneur; investor; content creator; lecturer; innovation consultant
- Known for: Social and political activism
- Political party: The Democrats (since 2026)

Moshe Radman Abutbul (Hebrew: משה רדמן אבוטבול; born 6 October 1984) is an Israeli high-tech entrepreneur, investor, and activist. He is among the leaders of the protest against the judicial reform promoted by the 37th government of Israel.

== Biography ==
Radman was born and raised in Lod to Sara (née Abutbul) and Yitzhak Radman. His father is the son of Holocaust survivors from Poland and his mother, the daughter of immigrants from Morocco. From elementary school he studied in a program for gifted children, including the school for gifted children and an excellence track at Bar-Ilan University. He left high school after the 10th grade and spent two years prior to his military service working and reading. He studied independently for the matriculation exams and received special permission to take them without being enrolled in school.

After his discharge from the Israel Defense Forces, he taught preparation courses for the psychometric exam and later studied for a double-major bachelor's degree in economics and accounting at Tel Aviv University. Before the end of his bachelor's degree studies, he began working as a practitioner and later as a lecturer at the accounting preparatory school of Tel Aviv University.

=== Activity in the field of communication ===
Radman is a regular columnist in Globes who deals with innovation, created the podcast Digital.Tech.Business which provides information on connections and developments in the worlds of digital technology and business. He is also frequently interviewed in the media on these issues.

=== Activity in education ===
Radman lectures in the management department of the College of Management for undergraduate and graduate students (MBA) in business administration. Among other things, he teaches the course "Technologies in the service of marketing". He also built the first course in Israel that deals with generative artificial intelligence (Generative AI) and Metaverse "characteristics of disruptive technologies".

== Protest activity ==
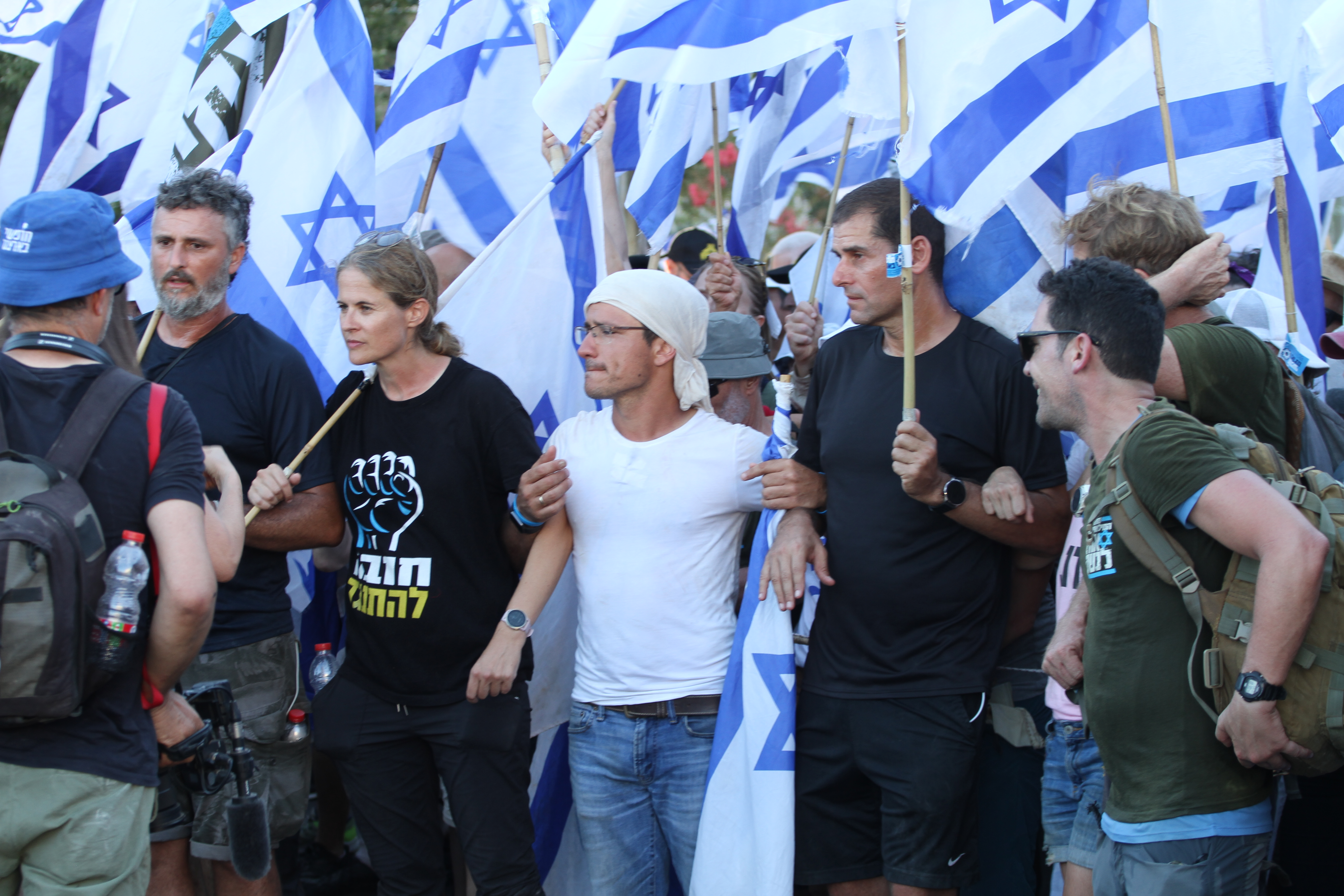
Leaders of the protest march to Jerusalem. From left to right; Ran Harnevo, Shikma Bressler, Moshe Radman, Ami Dror. 22 July 2023.

With the outbreak of the protest against the judicial reform in January 2023, Radman left his occupations and, together with other activists, founded the "High Tech Protest". Radman works voluntarily to convince citizens who support the reform to reconsider their position, by dismantling fake news in the videos he distributes and in media interviews. In addition, he holds information sessions and meetings with supporters of the judicial reform, in order to explain the meaning and dangers inherent in it. In March 2023, he initiated and published the newspaper "Israel the day after" whose purpose was to reflect on the consequences of the judicial reform (should it come to fruition) and on the future day-to-day life in Israel. 50 thousand copies of the newspaper were distributed throughout the country and it was also distributed digitally.

Radman is a prominent field activist in the protest, and has been arrested a number of times by the police. The first arrest occurred on 1 March 2023, during a demonstration in Tel Aviv. The second arrest took place on 23 March 2023, in Tel Aviv, as part of a national day of disruption as part of the protest. According to Radman, during the arrest he was beaten by policemen and evacuated from the scene of the arrest by an ambulance. He was later diagnosed with a concussion and admitted to intensive care at Ichilov Hospital. According to him, his arrest was done deliberately by the police due to his centrality in the struggle. On the day of his arrest, several other protest leaders were arrested, including Shikma Bressler, the leader of the Black Flags protest. The third arrest took place on 2 June 2023, at a demonstration held in front of Prime Minister Benjamin Netanyahu's residence in Caesarea. Also in this case, according to a document that was circulated, the arrest was violently executed and he was taken to a hospital after a medic stated that there was a fear that he was suffering from a concussion.

He has spoken regularly on various stages throughout the country as part of the protests, sometimes at several demonstrations on the same day, including at the main demonstrations in Ashkelon, Ra'anana, Herzliya, Ramat Hasharon, Petah Tikva, Kiryat Ono, Be'er Sheva and Rehovot. On 11 March 2023, he spoke on the main stage at a protest in Haifa. He spoke at the main demonstration in Kaplan St. (Tel Aviv) on 15 April, 6 May, 3 June and 1 July 2023.

On 18 July 2023, together with other protest leaders (Shikma Bressler, Ran Harnevo and Ami Dror), he initiated a march from Kaplan Street in Tel Aviv to Jerusalem as an act of protest against the coalition's intentions to approve in the second and third reading the law to reduce the reasonableness clause. On 24 July 2023, Radman was arrested by police at a mass protest rally near the Knesset.

On 29 July 2023, Radman was arrested by police for holding a flare. According to Radman, he took it from another protester in order to prevent its use.

== Political activity ==
On 6 January 2026, Radman announced his joining the Democratic Party led by Yair Golan. In the primary elections held on July 20, 2026, ahead of the 2026 Israeli legislative election, Radman came in at number nine on the slate.

== Personal life ==
Radman is married to Meital and has three children. Lives in Tel Mond.

== See also ==
- 2023 Israeli anti-judicial reform protests, part of the 2023 Israel constitutional crisis and led, among others, by Moshe Radman
