= Ami Dror =

Israeli businessman and activist

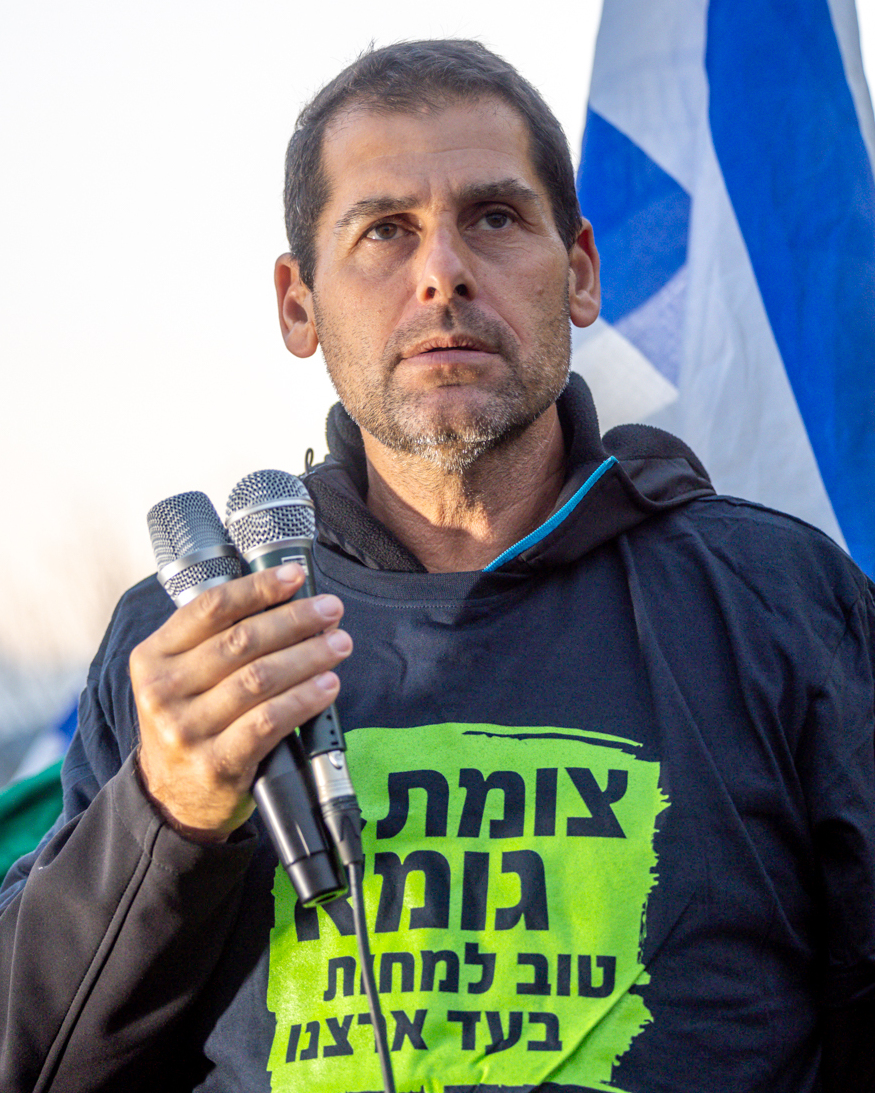
- Ami Dror in 2025
- Born: עמי דרור; Ashkelon, Israel
- Occupations: high-tech entrepreneur; educator; lecturer
- Known for: Social activism
- Political party: The Democrats (since 2026)

Ami Dror (Hebrew: עמי דרור) is an Israeli businessman, educator, activist, and a leader of the protests against the judicial reform being promoted by the thirty-seventh government of Israel headed by Benjamin Netanyahu.

== Early life and education ==
Ami Dror was born and raised in Ashkelon, to Aviva (Laskov) and Arie Dror. His father was a Holocaust survivor from Romania, and his mother was born in Israel. As a member of a religious family, he was educated at the Sinai School in Ashkelon and was active in the Bnei Akiva movement.

== Career ==
=== IDF and Shin Bet service ===
He served as a tank commander in the Armored Corps. After his release from the IDF, he attended an aircraft security course and the day after the assassination of Yitzhak Rabin, he joined Shin Bet's Personal Security Unit, in which he was in charge of securing Shimon Peres and was the commander of the security squad for Benjamin Netanyahu and Ehud Barak. After completing his service in the unit in 2000, he joined the Foreign Ministry and served in Dublin and Marseille, until 2003.

=== Entrepreneurship ===
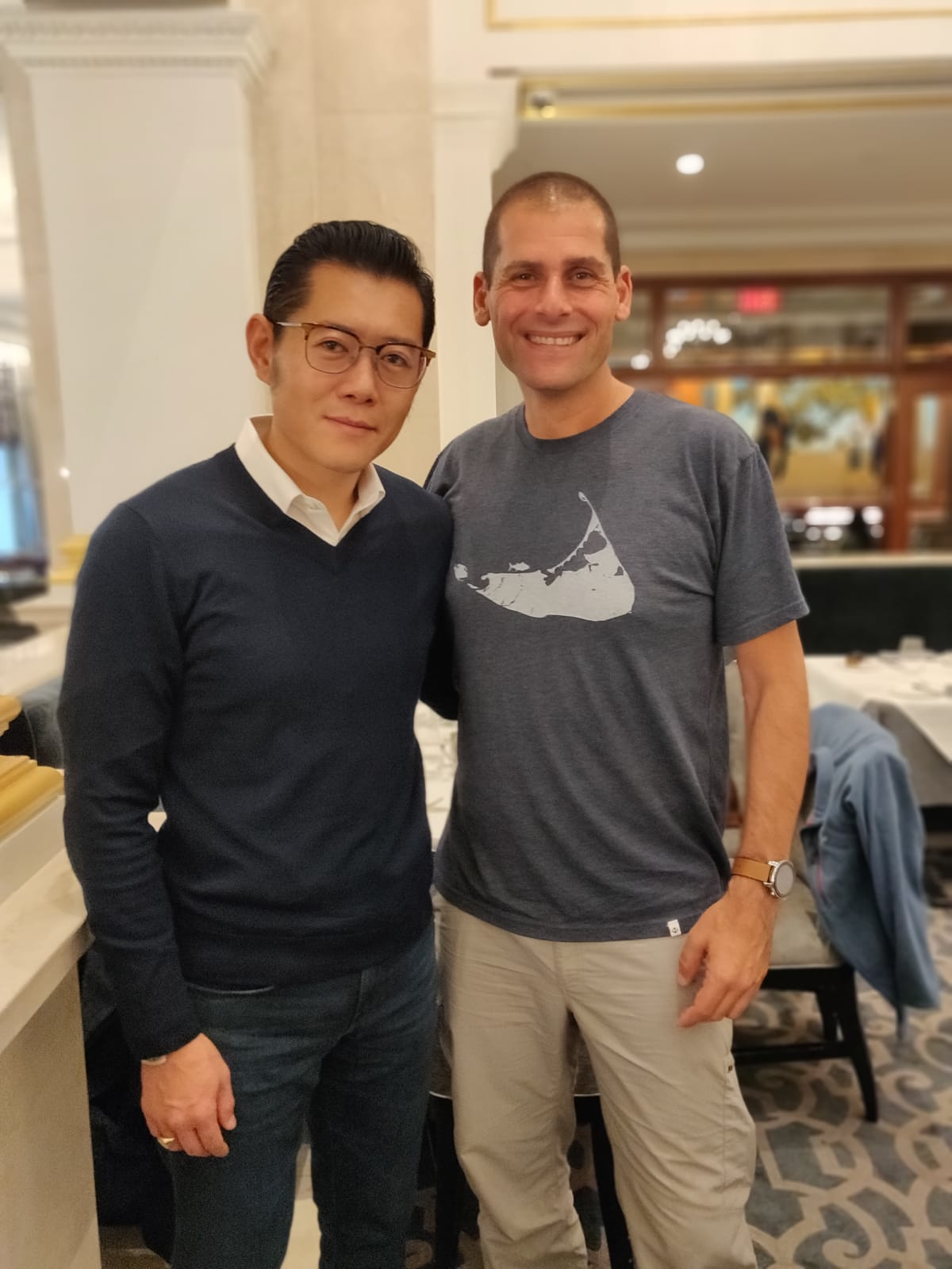
Ami Dror with the King of Bhutan Jigme Khesar Namgyel Wangchuck, 4 November 2019

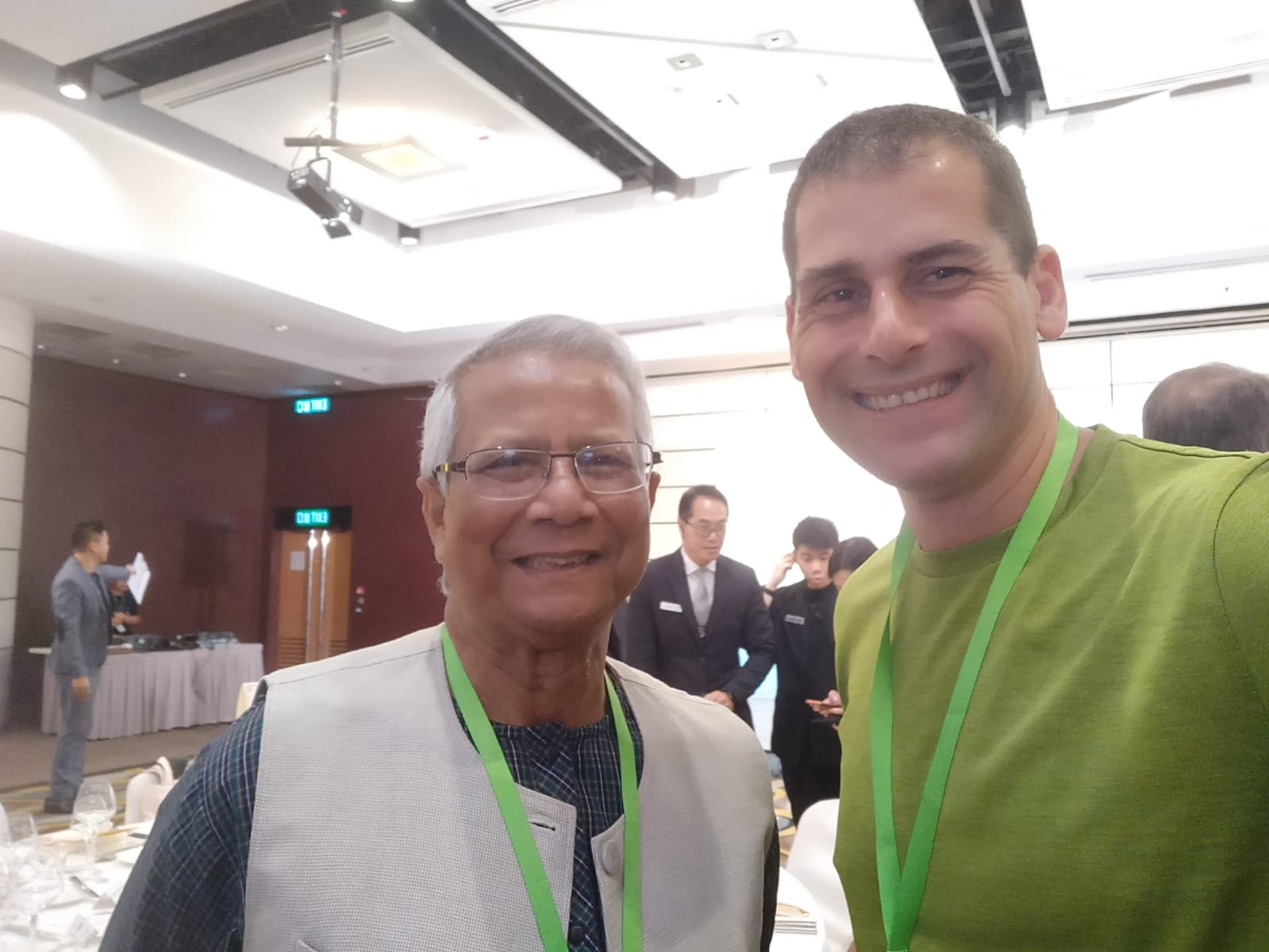
Ami Dror (Founder of LeapLearner) with Muhammad Yunus (Bangladeshi social entrepreneur & Nobel Peace Prize winner), 1 May 2022

In 2005, Dror founded the XpanD 3D company with Maria Costira, which developed technology for showing 3D movies, and served as its strategic manager. Film director James Cameron presented the film Avatar using the company's technology in 2009. As part of the company, Dror in collaboration with Panasonic, Samsung and Sony led the development of a unified standard for 3D televisions.

In 2014, Dror founded the investment company Zaitoun Ventures with Forsan Hossein. The company supported high-tech companies and required them to reach within three years a situation where at least 30% of their employees belong to one of the populations suffering from underrepresentation in the labor market. That same year, Dror served as a judge in the innovation category of the Cannes Lions Festival.

In 2016, Dror moved with his family to Shanghai to found LeapLearner with his Chinese partners Aaron Tien and Lao Zho. LeapLearner developed programming-learning software for children. In 2018, Dror was selected as one of the ten most brilliant entrepreneurs in China and won an award on behalf of Shanghai Media Group, the largest media corporation in China. In 2019, as part of his work at LeapLearner, he initiated and was a partner in promoting technological education in African countries. In part, he helped establish programming schools for youth in Sierra Leone, Nigeria, and Kenya.

In 2022, Dror founded BriBooks company, which allows children to write, publish, and sell books. The idea to establish the company arose when Dror published a children's book and realized how complicated and expensive the process of publishing and selling a book is, and dedicated himself to making it accessible to every child. The company won the Red Herring Award as one of the 100 most promising technology companies in the world.

=== Speaking engagements, philanthropy, and book ===
In 2014, Dror was accepted as a fellow in the Henry Crown Fellowship of the Aspen Institute. In 2018, he became a facilitator in the program and since then he has been conducting leadership programs in Aspen and Harvard University. He also gives lectures and other leadership workshops around the world.

In 2019, Dror published a book in partnership with Jordan Huang, an expert in Chinese education, which deals with successful practices for educating children for innovation, based on the Jewish and Chinese cultures. The book was published in an English edition and a Chinese edition.

Dror is a board member of the American philanthropic organization Space for Humanity, which flies social entrepreneurs into space on private flights.

=== Activism ===
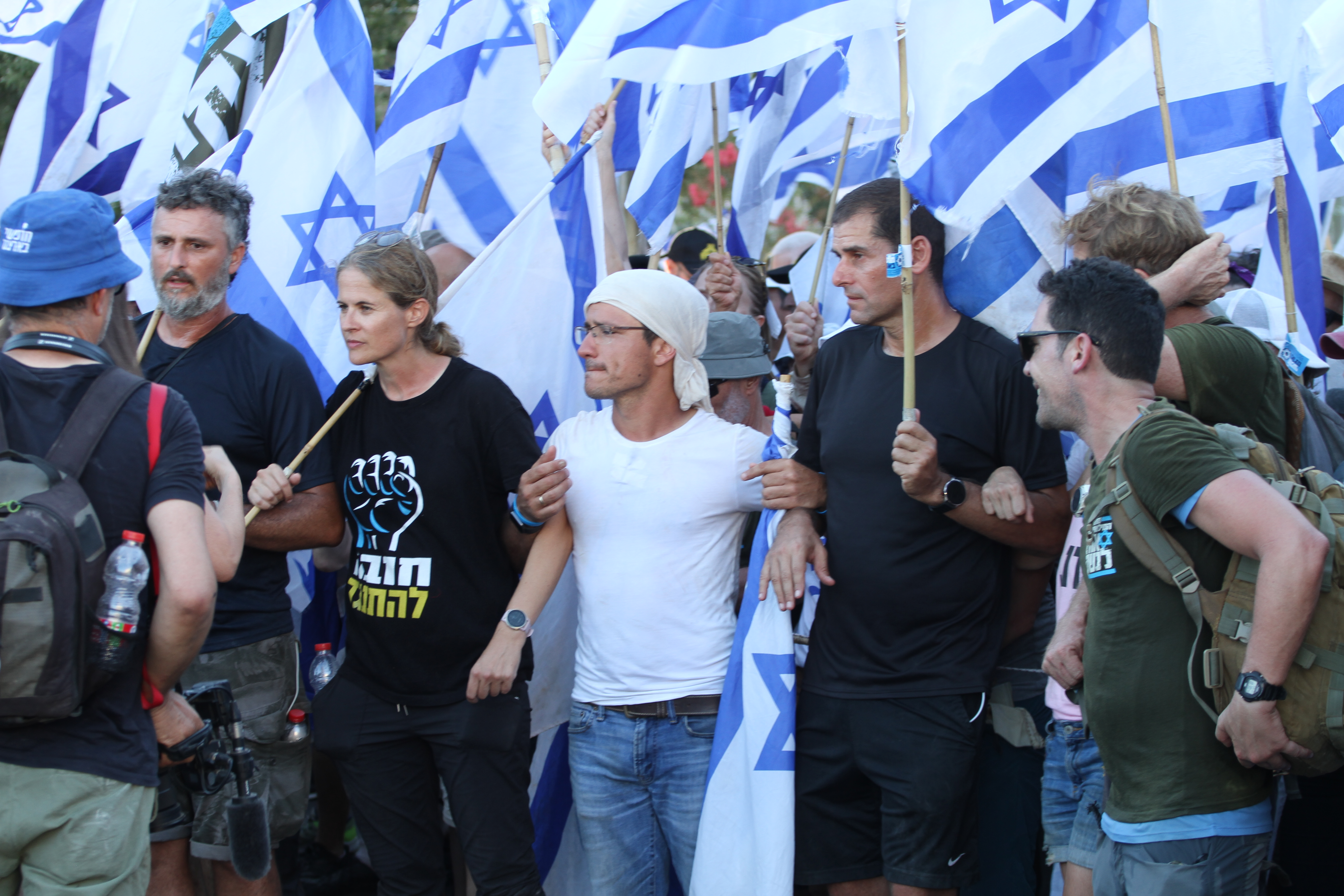
Leaders of the protest march to Jerusalem. From left to right; Ran Harnevo, Shikma Bressler, Moshe Radman, Dror. 22 July 2023.

In January 2023, after Justice Minister Yariv Levin announced the planned legislative measures, Dror became one of the protest movement's leaders leading activists, and being interviewed by the media and speaking at demonstrations across the country.

On 18 July 2023, together with 3 other protest leaders (Shikma Bressler, Moshe Radman and Ran Harnevo), he initiated a mass foot march from Kaplan Street in Tel Aviv to Jerusalem as an act of protest against the coalition's intentions to approve in the second and third reading the law to reduce the reasonableness clause.

On 6 June, Knesset member Zvi Sukkot threatened Dror that he would sue him for sharing truncated parts of his interview. On 3 August, Dror together with other protest leaders filed a lawsuit against Likud activist Ronit Levy claiming that she published their phone numbers and called for harassment.

On 1 August 2023, Dror was detained by the police in a demonstration in front of the Salme police in Tel Aviv, due to the use of a stun gun.

Following the Hamas attack on Israel and the subsequent outbreak of the Gaza war in October 2023, Dror, along with other protest activists, repurposed his protest activity towards war-time aid and relief by joining the efforts led by organizations such as Brothers and Sisters for Israel and Women Building an Alternative. In an interview, Dror stated that at times such as these people are looking for a calming figure in leadership and one whom they can rely on. In that sense, Dror claimed that the current government is "non-existent".

=== Political activity ===
On January 6, 2026, Dror announced his joining the Democratic Party led by Yair Golan.

== Personal life ==
Dror is a divorced father of three children and lives in Tel Aviv.

== Awards and recognition ==
- Yicai Brilliant prize (2018)

== Books ==
- Raising Future Innovators: Leveraging Jewish & Chinese Best Practices in Education. Ami Dror and Jordan Huang. 17 March 2019. ISBN 978-1-7337811-0-7.
- Python The Super Hero. BriBooks. 6 June 2022. ISBN 978-93-94848-00-9.

== See also ==
- 2023 Israeli anti-judicial reform protests, part of the 2023 Israel constitutional crisis and led, among others, by Ami Dror
