= Ran Harnevo =

Israeli entrepreneur, content creator, social and political activist

- רן הר נבו
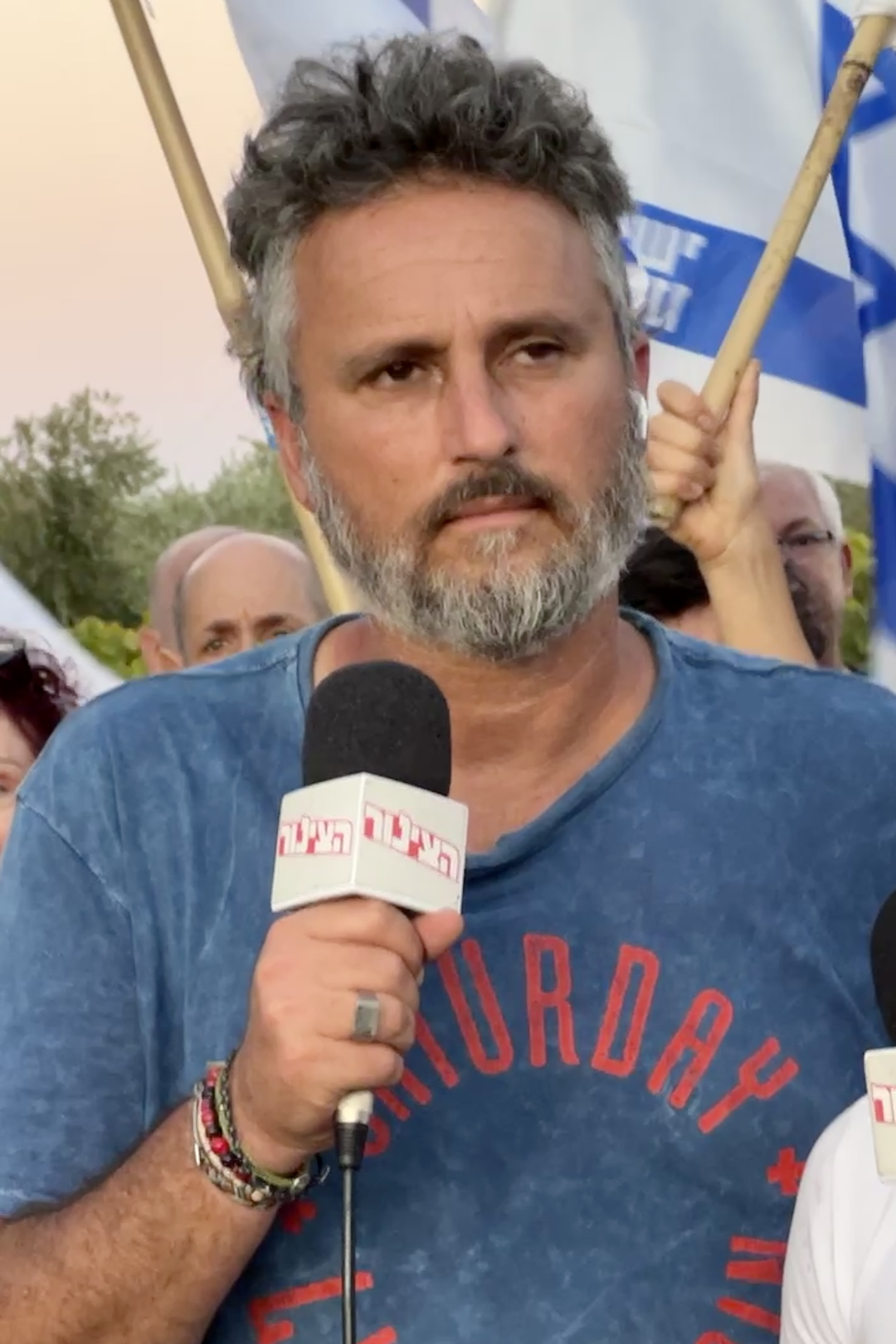
- Ran Harnevo, 2023
- Born: רן הר נבו; 1975 (age 50–51); Neve Monosson, Israel
- Occupations: Entrepreneur; Content creator
- Known for: Social activism

Ran Harnevo (Hebrew: רן הר נבו; born 1975) is an Israeli entrepreneur, content creator, and social and political activist. He is a former combat navigator pilot and founder of the "Yalla Tikva" content team as part of the protest against the 37th government of Israel.

== Biography ==
Harnevo was born in Neve Monosson in 1975. He studied at Mikif Yehud High School. He served as a combat navigator (WSO) in the Air Force and was an instructor at the IAF flight school and commander of the combat navigation course. In that capacity, he signed the 2003 pilots letter, in which several dozen IAF pilots declared they would refuse to fly missions involving IDF operations in Judea and Samaria. Consequently, Gen. Dan Halutz, then Commander of the IAF, reportedly relieved Harnevo from his command post at the flight school.

He studied for a bachelor's degree in philosophy and computer science and at the same time wrote articles on the "Bama Hadasha" website. He left before finishing his degree to work as a journalist and editor of a local newspaper, "Tel Aviv". He left his job as a journalist after a critical and incisive interview with a senior minister was edited and rewritten without his knowledge. He then worked on the aerospace industry's drone project in offshore drilling in Angola.

Between 2008 and 2021 he lived in New York City. In 2021 he returned to live in Israel.

Harnevo is married and has two children.

== Entrepreneurship ==
In 2006 he founded "5min Media", along with Hanan Laschover and Tal Simantov, a video content company, which engaged in the production and distribution of short instructional videos including useful information on a variety of topics (How tos), a sort of Wikipedia for videos. In 2008, the company's business model changed and it became a platform that connects video content creators and publishers and the scope of its activity increased significantly. In 2010, the company was sold to the American video giant AOL for 65 million dollars and became a division within it. Harnevo was appointed vice president and later president of video at AOL. Under his management, the company's global division produced about fifty original programs, launched the "AOL on" brand and outlined a new syndication program. In 2014 he retired from the company.

In 2015, together with Ron Zuckerman and Uri Birnbaum, he founded "Backstage" (Bkstg), a platform for connecting musicians directly with their fans, through a mobile application. The company was closed in 2016.

In 2017, together with Hanan Laschover, he founded the company Homeis, which developed a social platform designed to help local communities of immigrants in finding work and housing, the company was closed in 2021.

== Yalla Tikva and the protests against the 37th government of Israel ==
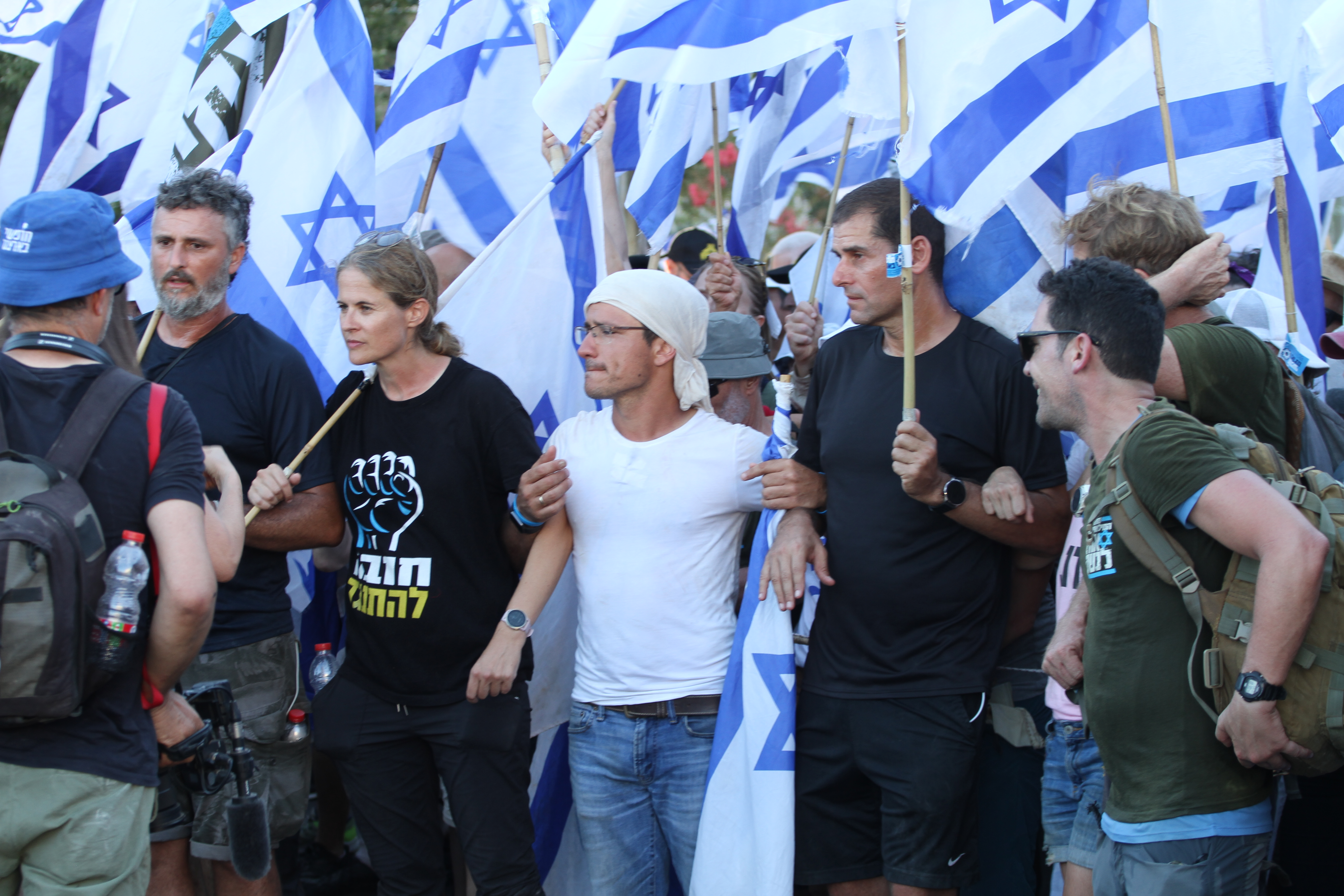
Leaders of the protest march to Jerusalem. From left to right; Ran Harnevo, Shikma Bressler, Moshe Radman, Ami Dror, July 22, 2023.

After the thirty-seventh Israeli government was sworn in in December 2022 and in view of the judicial reform it is promoting, Harnevo joined the high-tech protest. In January 2023, together with Assaf Shapir and Michal Shapir-Klein, he founded a content creation team that produces and distributes video content on a variety of online platforms: YouTube, TikTok, Instagram, Facebook, Twitter, Telegram and WhatsApp. The team, known as "Yalla Tikva" (Let's Go Hope) is composed of editors, producers, content people and programmers who work voluntarily, as part of the protest against the thirty-seventh government of Israel and the judicial reform it promotes. According to Harnevo, "Netanyahu works like a machine and distributes receptive information, while on our side there is a vacuum. I decided to set up a project for a limited time to replace the poison machine with a hope machine, to tell the truth through videos that people can share online, and thus fight back."

Within the framework of "Yalla Tikva", Harnevo hosts the podcast "Am Israel Hai" (The Nation of Israel Lives) with actress Maayan Loeub.

In the first four months of activity, the team produced more than 700 videos, recruited 45 thousand distributors on WhatsApp and received tens of millions of views. Some of the videos are professional and some are based on content sent by the public, some are informative and explanatory and some are inspiring and emotional. In May 2023, the team embarked on a crowdfunding campaign with the aim of turning the project into a significant digital platform that will accompany the protest in its next stages. In the first day, more than 500,000 NIS were raised from the public and in total over 1 million NIS was raised.

Following his activity in "Yallah Tikva", Harnevo appeared in tech12 magazine's list of influential figures in high-tech in the field of content production in 2023. He is invited to lectures and speeches as part of the protest and even spoke at the main demonstration in Kaplan on June 17, 2023.

On July 18, together with other protest leaders (Professor Shikma Bressler, Moshe Radman and Ami Dror), he initiated a mass foot march from Kaplan Street in Tel Aviv to Jerusalem as an act of protest against the coalition's intentions to approve in the second and third reading the law to reduce the reasonableness clause.

== See also ==
- 2023 Israeli anti-judicial reform protests, part of the 2023 Israel constitutional crisis and led, among others, by Ran Harnevo
