= Shikma Bressler =

Israeli physicist and social activist

- שקמה ברסלר
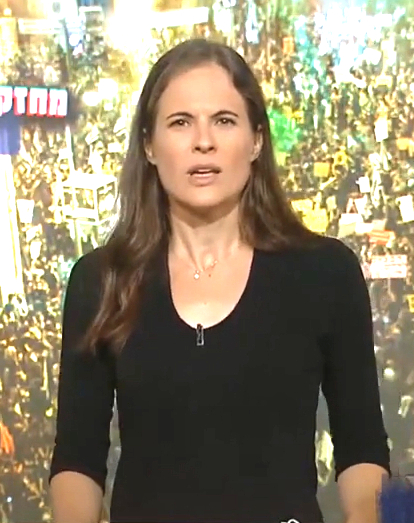
- Shikma Bressler giving a speech at "The Great Virtual Protest", September 26, 2020
- Born: July 10, 1980 (age 46); Haifa, Israel
- Education: Technion – Israel Institute of Technology
- Occupation: Researcher
- Years active: 2013–present
- Known for: Physics research; Social activism; Entrepreneurship

Shikma Schwarzmann-Bressler (Hebrew: שקמה ברסלר; born July 10, 1980) is an Israeli physicist. A researcher at the Weizmann Institute of Science, she is among those taking part in research at the CERN particle accelerator in Switzerland as a member of the ATLAS collaboration. She is also a social activist and leading figure in the "Black Flags" protests against Benjamin Netanyahu.

== Biography ==
Bressler was born in Haifa, the second child of four, to a physician mother and a father who was a senior worker at Elbit systems. She grew up in Kibbutz Gvat and Timrat. When she was younger she played basketball on the Hapoel Galil Elyon basketball team and on Israel's youth national team. After her army service, Bressler moved on to play for Hapoel Haifa W.B.C.. She retired from basketball after she was injured and began her studies at the Technion. She married and had two children. She later divorced and remarried and has five daughters.

== Scientific career ==
Bressler is a physicist at the Weizmann Institute of Science. She completed her bachelor's degree, with distinction, in physics and mathematics at the Technion, where she also completed her master's degree in physics in 2006 and a Ph.D. in 2011. In 2012, she joined the faculty at the Weizmann Institute. In November 2023 she was nominated as associate professor.

In 2013, Bressler formed a team at the Weizmann Institute entrusted with the development of detectors and particle physics. This team deals with the development of advanced concepts in the field of radiation detectors. She is an active researcher at the CERN particle accelerator in Switzerland, where she deals with gathering data from the ATLAS experiment in search of physics beyond the standard model of particle physics.

Bressler heads a physics research group in the particle and astrophysics department of the Weizmann Institute and deals with the research into the Higgs Boson

== Social activism ==
=== "Black Flag" protests (2020-2021) ===
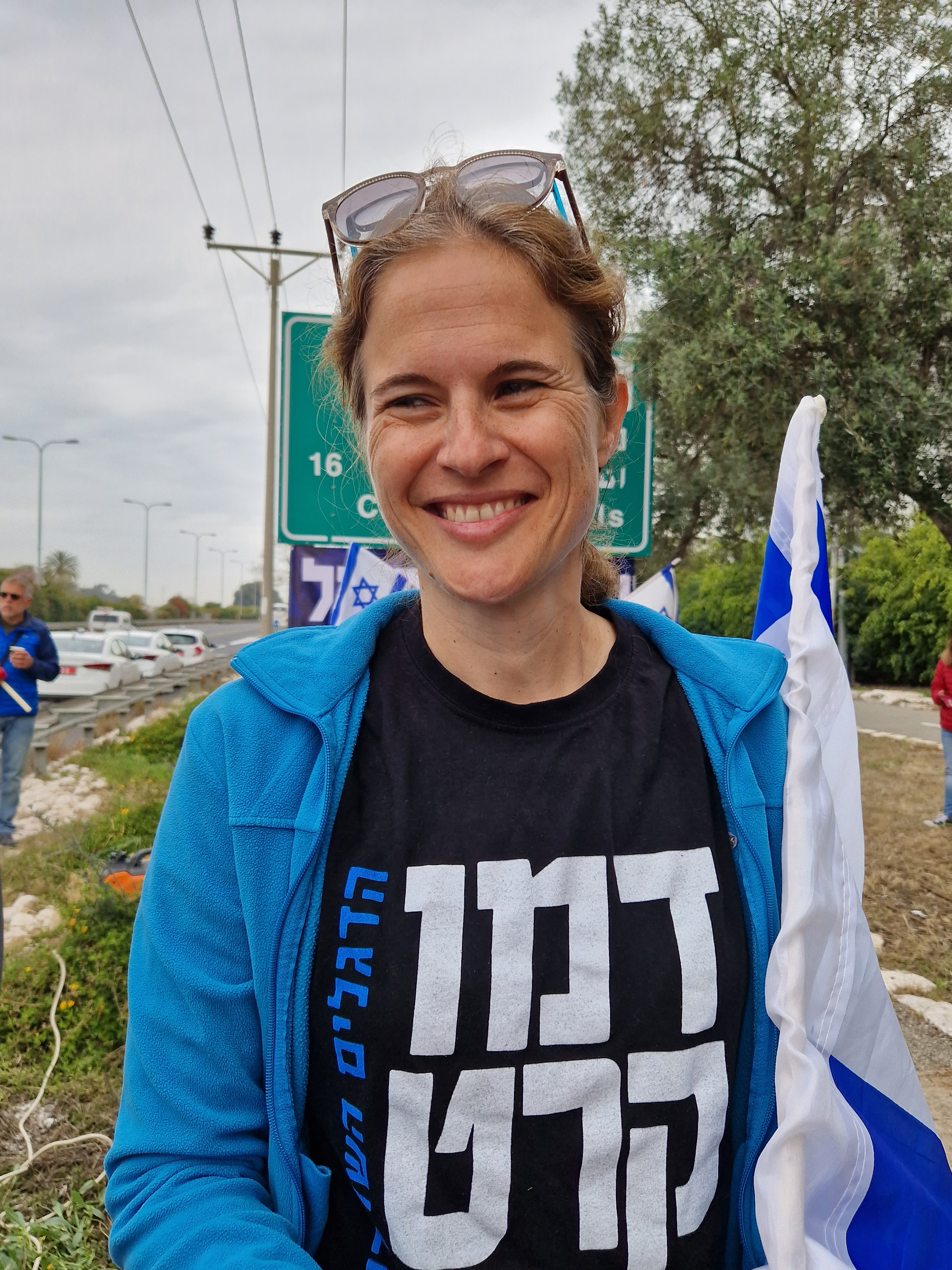
Shikma Bressler at a demonstration in Kiryat Bialik March 23, 2023

In March 2020, Bressler founded and led the "Black Flag Protests", along with two of her brothers, Yarden and Eyal, and two family friends. Following the 2020 Israeli legislative elections, President Reuven Rivlin tasked the chair of the Blue and White party of forming a government. Outgoing Knesset chair Yuli Edelstein, refused to relinquish his position for the new chair in an attempt to prevent the establishment of a committee which would convene to deliberate on removing parliamentary immunity of Prime Minister Benjamin Netanyahu. Bressler and two of her brothers initiated protest convoys to the Knesset and protests near the homes of Knesset members and members of the Israel Resilience Party headed by Benny Gantz. The protestors began with three demands. The first, the election of a new chair of the Knesset after the 3rd elections in a year, while Benny Gantz and the block of parties opposed to the continuation of Netanyahu's rule should be entrusted with the task of forming a government. Their second demand was the establishment of Knesset committees with parliamentary supervision, and the third demand was the legislation of an amendment to the basic law pertaining to the formation of a government and regulating government powers so that in the future, a person indicted on criminal charges would not be able to run for Prime Minister. The protest movement spread throughout the country and came to be known as "The Black Flag Protest".

=== Judicial reforms protest (2023) ===
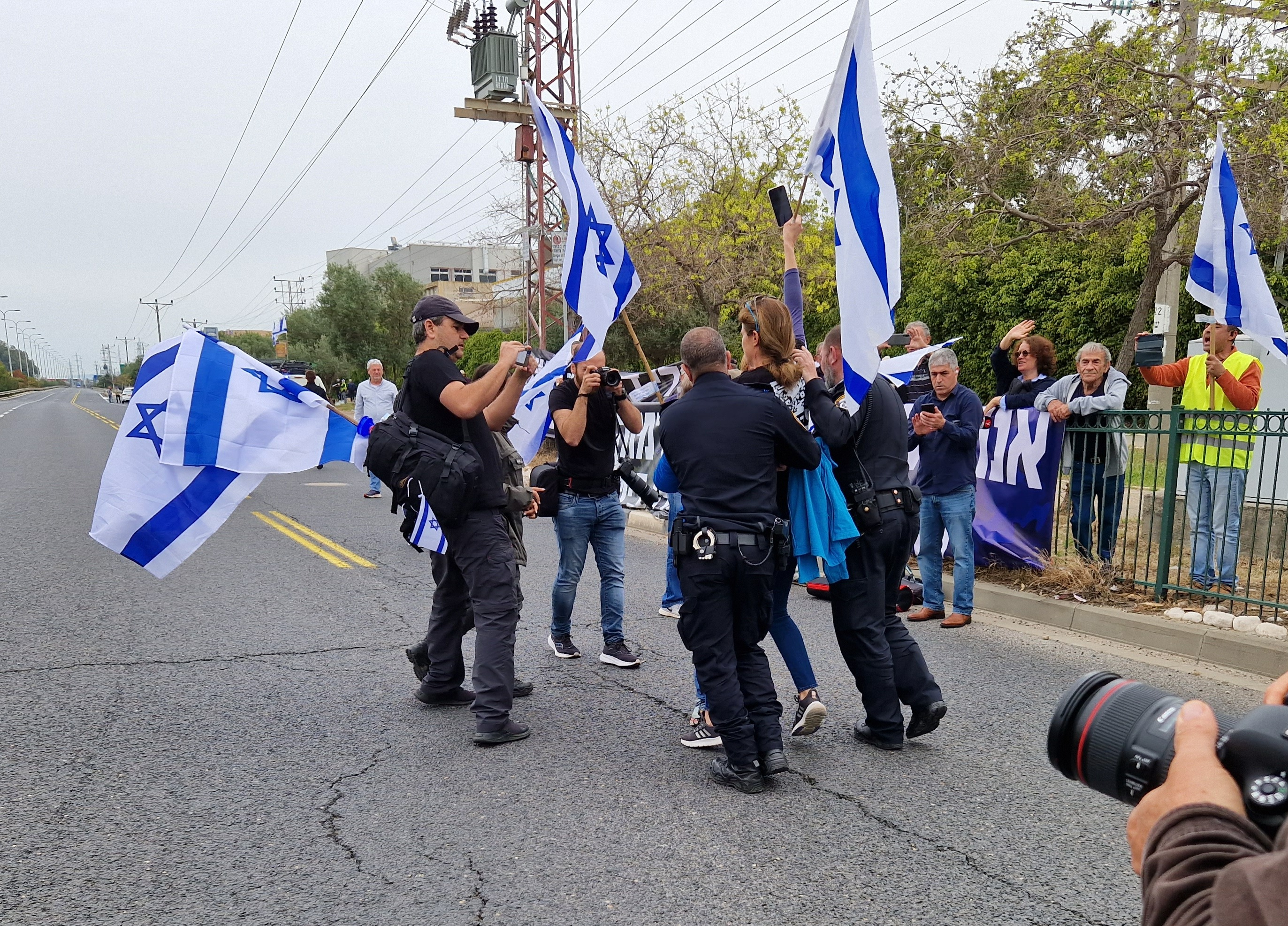
Arrest of Shikma Bressler at a demonstration in Kiryat Bialik March 23, 2023

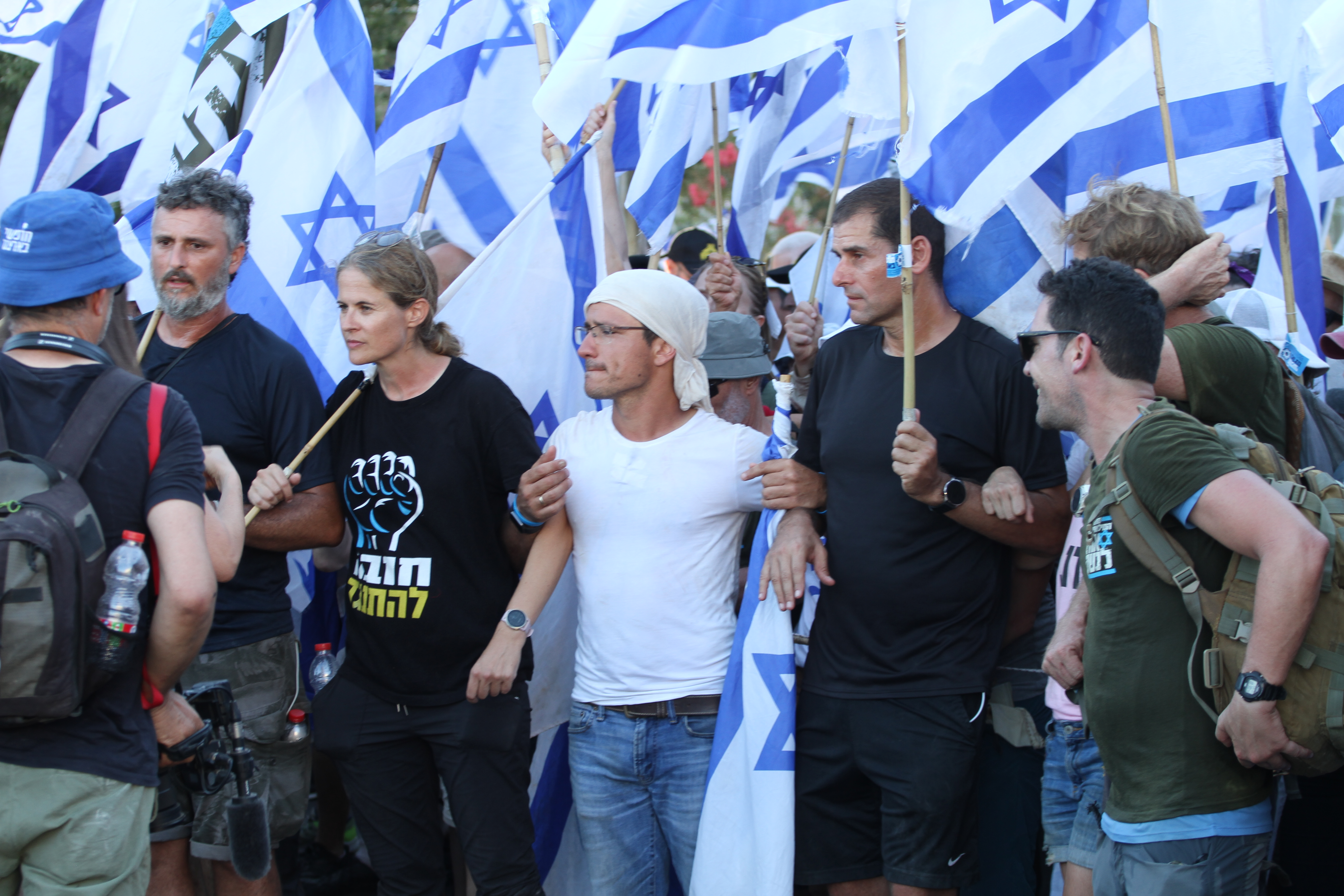
Leaders of the protest march to Jerusalem (from left to right: Ran Harnevo, Shikma Bressler, Moshe Radman, Ami Dror)

On March 23, 2023, Bressler was detained by police during one of the many "Day of Disruption" protests held across Israel as part of the 2023 Israeli anti-judicial reform protests. She was later released. Former Prime Minister and protest leader, Ehud Barak, tweeted that Bressler's arrest was "dictatorship in action". Knesset Member and Labor party leader, Merav Michaeli, stated that "in a normal country Shikma Bressler would be given the Israel Prize. In the state of Netanyahu and Ben-Gvir she is arrested as a common criminal." In July 2023, Bressler announced they would march from Tel Aviv to Jerusalem. The five day march from Kaplan Street in Tel Aviv to Jerusalem was a protest against the law proposal to reduce the reasonableness clause. It is considered one of the largest protest-marches ever held in Israel.

In September 2023 it was claimed that Bressler was charging US$20,000 for a meeting in person (or a personal Zoom meeting) with her while in New York City which caused a vocal outrage amongst her supporters and opponents alike. The protest movement Kaplan Force said however the event was an uncoordinated private initiative, that Bressler didn't engage in paid meetings and wasn't expected to be in the United States.

== Lawsuits ==
In February 2024 Bressler announced she had filed a defamation suit against Likud MK Tally Gotliv for falsely claiming that Bressler had "communicated with Hamas leader Yahya Sinwar before October 7." Both Bressler and Mossad denied Gotliv's claim. Prime Minister Benjamin Netanyahu also noted that Gotliv's claims were falsehoods.

In 2025, Israeli Prime Minister Benjamin Netanyahu initiated a series of defamation lawsuits against several individuals, including Shikma Bressler, in response to allegations linking him to financial dealings with Qatar in background of Qatargate. In defense, Bressler launched a crowdfunding campaign that rapidly raised funds to cover her legal expenses.

== Awards and recognition ==
In 2016, Bressler received the Charles Clore award for research.

In 2020, Bressler appeared in TheMarker's list of 100 most influential people in Israel and in Forbes magazine's list of 50 most influential women in Israel.

In 2021, Bressler received the Nathan Rosen Experimental Physics Prize for Young Physicists award from the Israeli Physical Society (IPS).
