= 2023 Israeli judicial reform protests =

Protests against the judicial reform initiated by the thirty-seventh government of Israel

Coordinates: 32.0725°N 34.7800°E

- Part of the reactions to the 2023 Israeli judicial reform
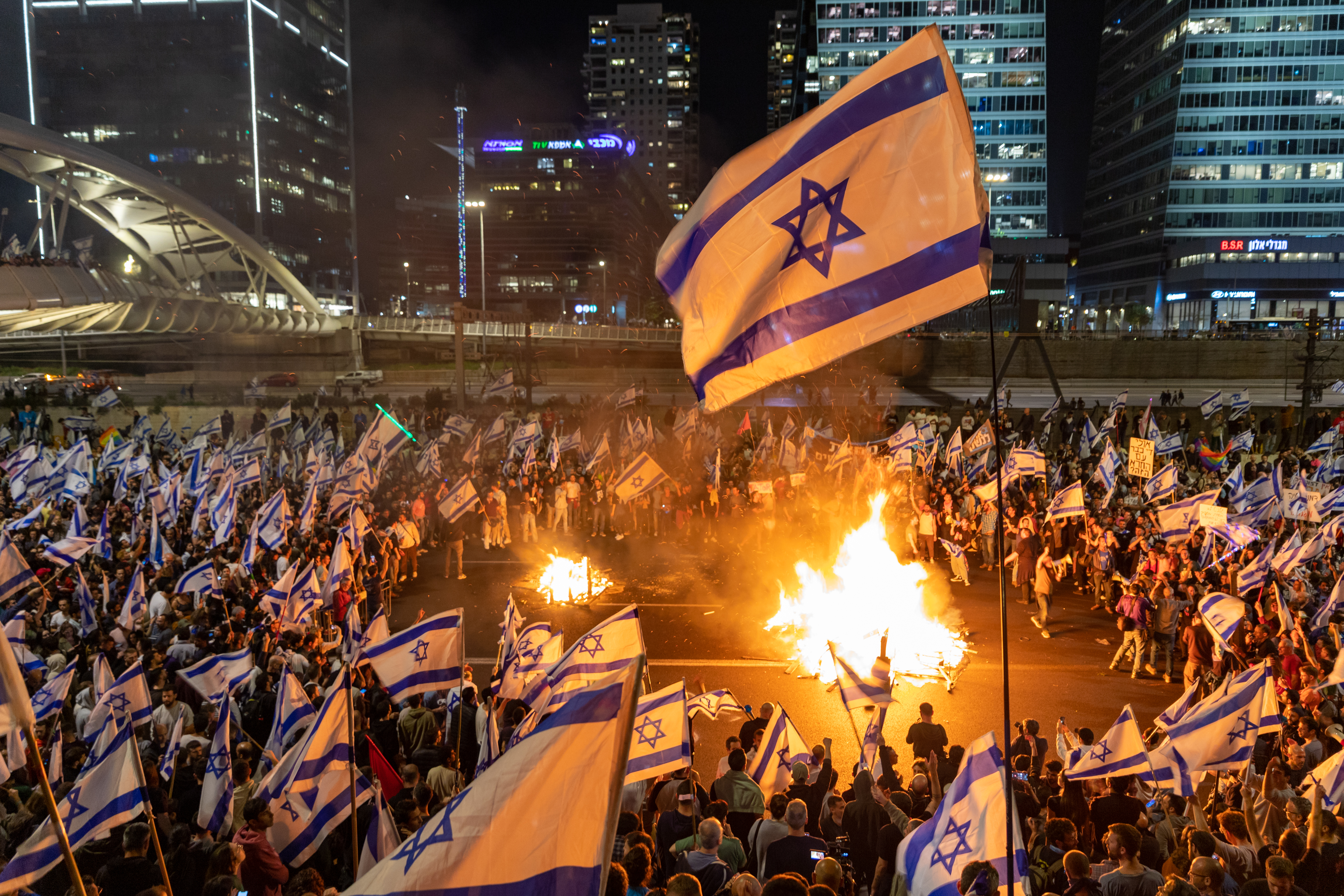
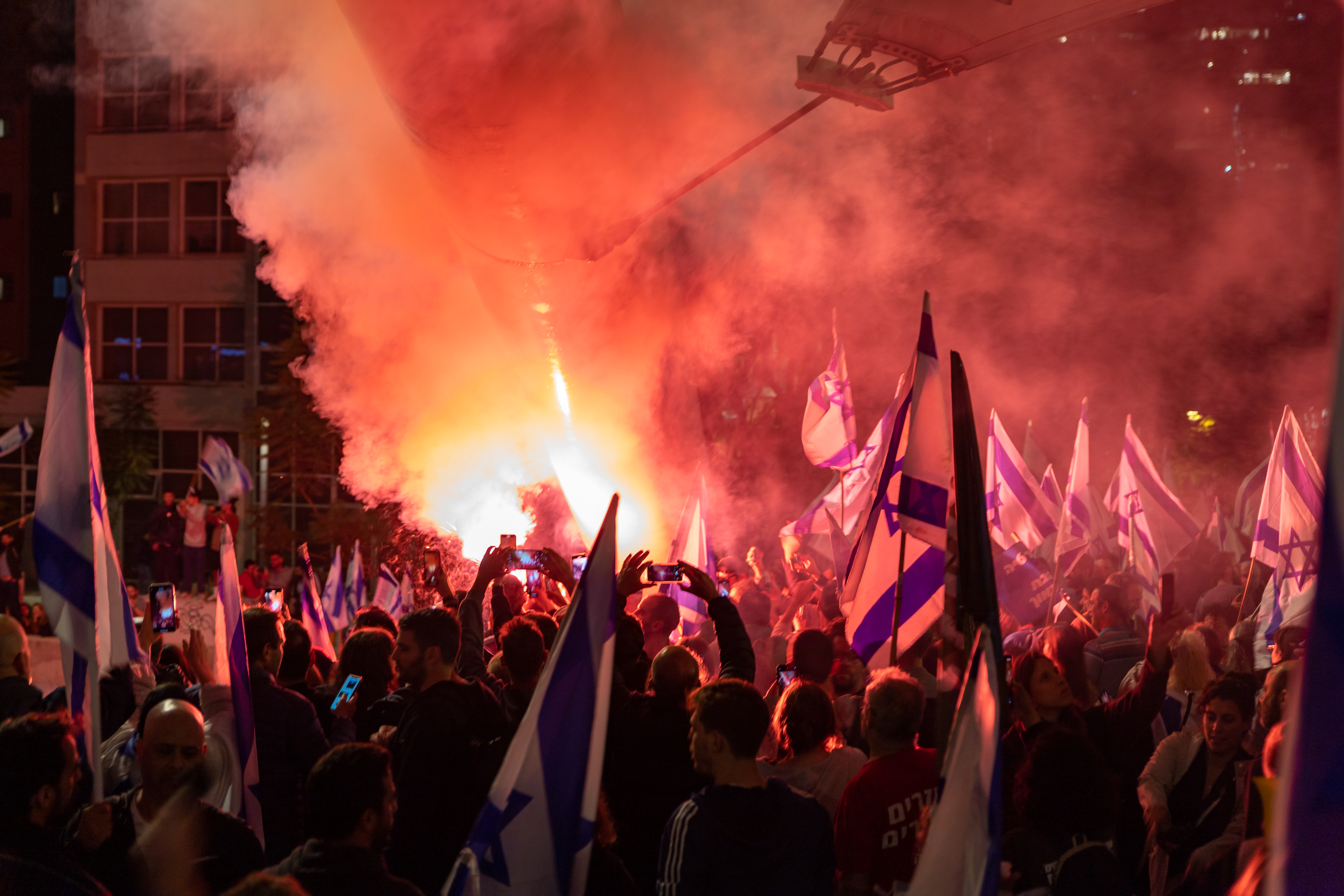
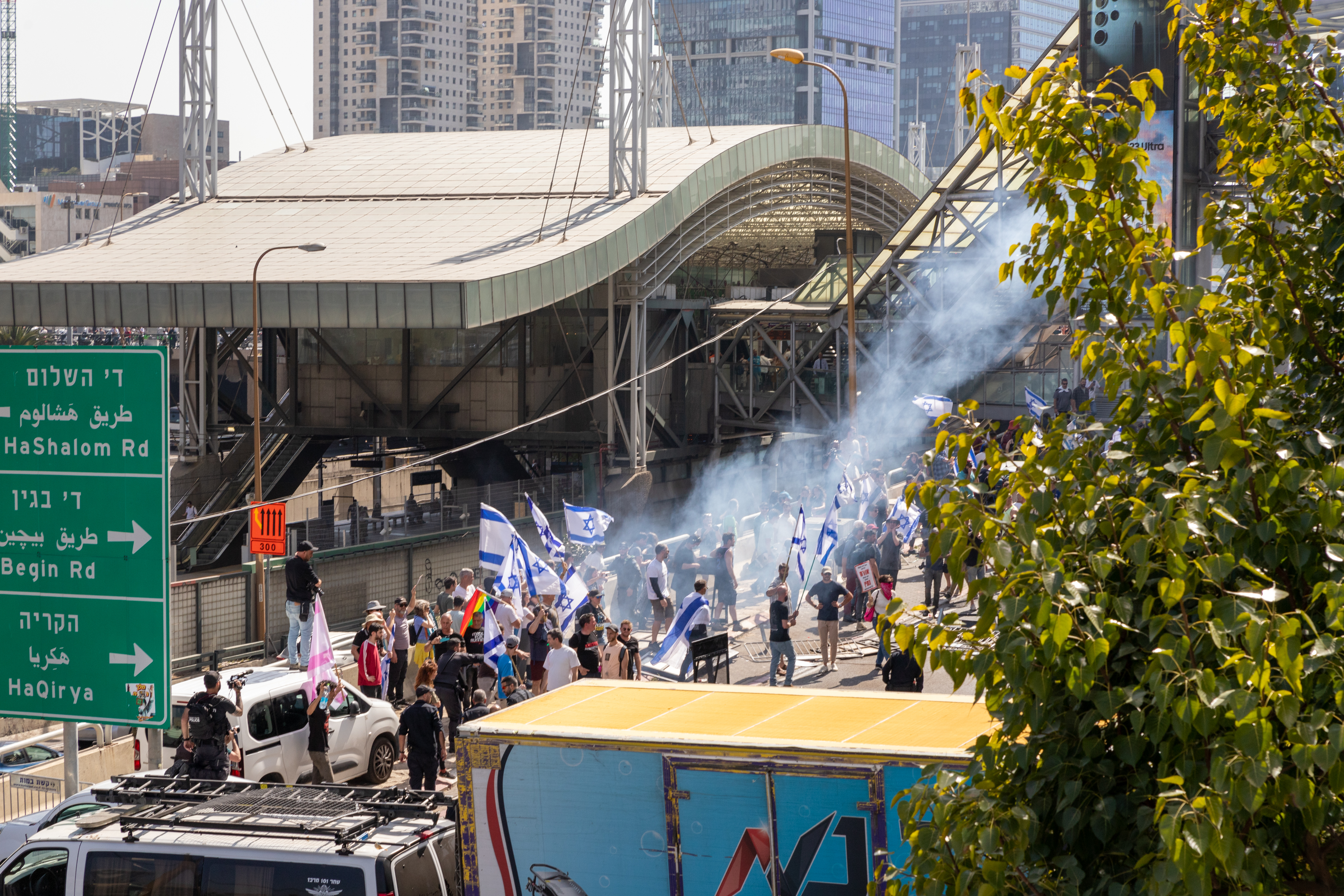
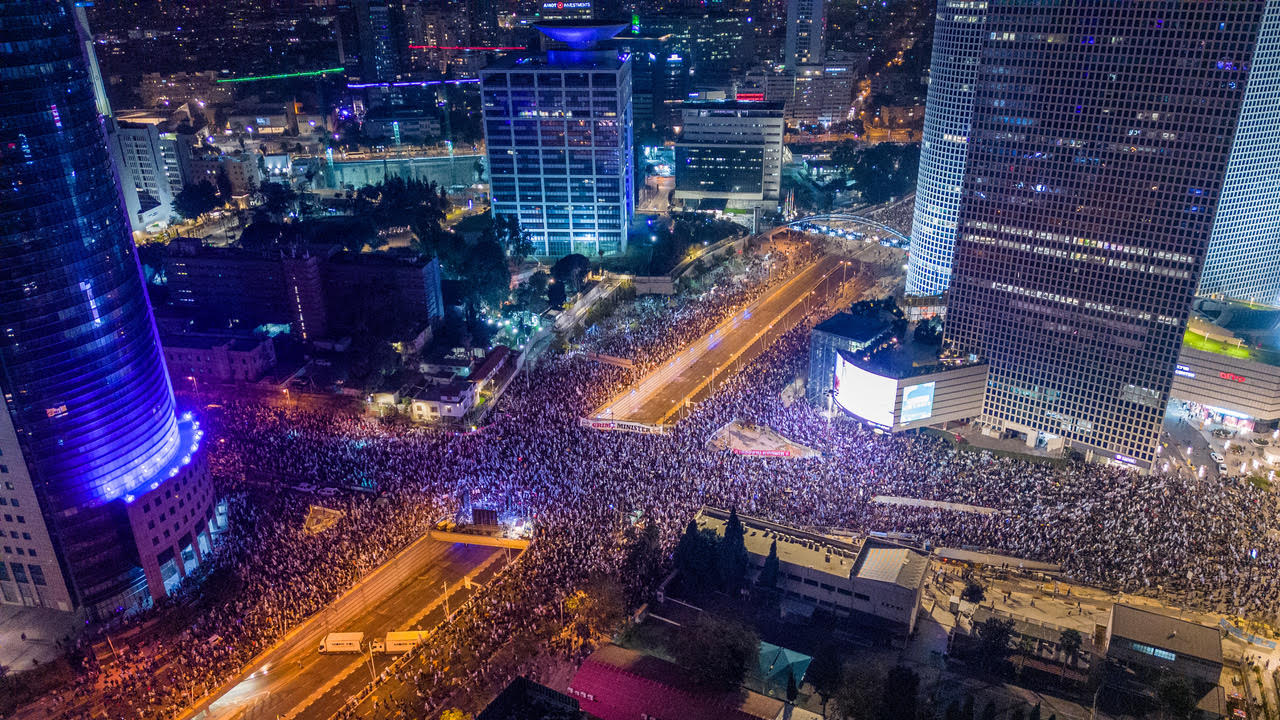
- Top to bottom, left to right: Mass protests in Ayalon on 26 March 2023 after Netanyahu fired Gallant; Protesters lighting up a flare; Police disperse protesters with stun grenades; Protest against the judicial reform near Tel Aviv's Azrieli Center on 4 March 2023
- Date: 7 January – 12 October 2023 (9 months and 5 days)
- Location: Israel, with solidarity protests in the United States
- Caused by: 2023 Israeli judicial reform
- Status: Ended: First major legislation (against "unreasonableness" grounds of the Supreme Court) passed by the Knesset in July 2023, but was struck down by the Supreme Court in January 2024; Ended due to the Gaza war and the formation of a war cabinet

Parties
Cabinet of Israel: Likud; Otzma Yehudit; Religious Zionist Party; United Torah Judaism; Shas; Supported by: Counterprotesters (pro-reform): Regavim	Protesters (anti-reform): Black Flag; Kaplan Force; Brothers in Arms; Women Building an Alternative; UnXeptable; Crime Minister; Hofshi Beartzenu; Supported by: Yesh Atid; Israeli Labor Party; National Unity; Yisrael Beiteinu; United Arab List; Hadash–Ta'al; Meretz

Lead figures
Benjamin Netanyahu; Yariv Levin; Simcha Rothman; Itamar Ben-Gvir	Shikma Bressler; Moran Zer Katzenstein; Or-ly Barlev; Nava Rozolyo; Ran Harnevo; Moshe Radman; Ami Dror; Ron Scherf; Ishay Hadas

Casualties
- Injuries: 128 protesters (3 seriously injured), 39 police officers (per police sources)
- Arrested: 1,064
- Charged: 7
- Fined: 200+

From January to October 2023, large-scale protests took place across Israel in response to the government's push for a wide-ranging judicial reform. The proposed reform aimed to give the government full control of the Supreme Court or court decisions through various ways. The government also attempted to dismantle the Israel Bar Association and change the makeup of the Judicial Selection Committee.

The reform was promoted by Justice Minister Yariv Levin with the backing of Prime Minister Benjamin Netanyahu and the leaders of the other parties in the governing coalition, but was opposed by opposition parties as well as a large segment of the Israeli public. The government was faced with questions on how much, if at all, they would focus on Palestinian rights. Statements by Israeli figures linked the aim of the reform to the expansion of Israeli settlements and further annexation of Israeli-occupied Palestinian territories.

The protests were effective in delaying the reform, and the ruling coalition would have lost 11 seats in a new round of elections according to polls published by September 2023. In July 2023, the Knesset passed a law to abolish the Supreme Court's ability to review government actions on grounds of reasonableness, but it was repealed by the Supreme Court on 1 January 2024. The protests came to an end following the Hamas-led attack on Israel on 7 October 2023 and the ensuing Gaza war, with sporadic demonstrations continuing until the formation of a war cabinet on 12 October. The protests partially resumed later in 2023, as part of broader protests in the country related to the war.

== Background ==
Since the political crisis beginning in 2018, multiple snap elections were held following unsuccessful attempts to form a governing coalition. The 2021 election was the first to have resulted in a successful government formation. The incumbent coalition, which held a one-seat majority, collapsed in June 2022 after a member defected. In the snap legislative election that followed, the incumbent government, led by Yair Lapid, was defeated by a coalition of right-wing parties, led by former prime minister Benjamin Netanyahu, who formed a new government that took office on 29 December 2022.

On 4 January 2023, newly appointed Justice Minister Yariv Levin announced plans to reform Israel's judiciary, including limiting the power of the Supreme Court and of the government's legal councillors and granting the governing coalition a majority on the committee that appoints judges. Following the announcement, several organisations, including Crime Minister and Standing Together, announced their intention to organise protests in Tel Aviv on 7 January. On 17 January, the Supreme Court ruled that the recently appointed Interior Minister Aryeh Deri was unfit for the position due to his criminal record. Netanyahu, who was on trial for corruption-related charges himself, was forced to withdraw Deri.

After Netanyahu announced a pause in the judicial legislation on 27 March, counter-protesters started organising their own demonstrations, with tens of thousands protesting in favour of the changes. Negotiations aimed at reaching a compromise collapsed in June, and the government resumed its plans to pass parts of the legislation; in response, the anti-reform movement ramped up its activities.

The Jerusalem Post reported that funding for the anti-reform protests primarily came from the public, both in terms of small donations and through volunteer work; larger donors included tech entrepreneurs, as well as organizations including the New Israel Fund, Blue White Future, Our Way, and Commanders for Israel's Security. Supporters named in the article are Ilan Shiloah, Orni Petruschka, Itay Ben-Horin, and Idan Tendler.

== Anti-reform demonstrations ==
=== 7 January–11 February ===
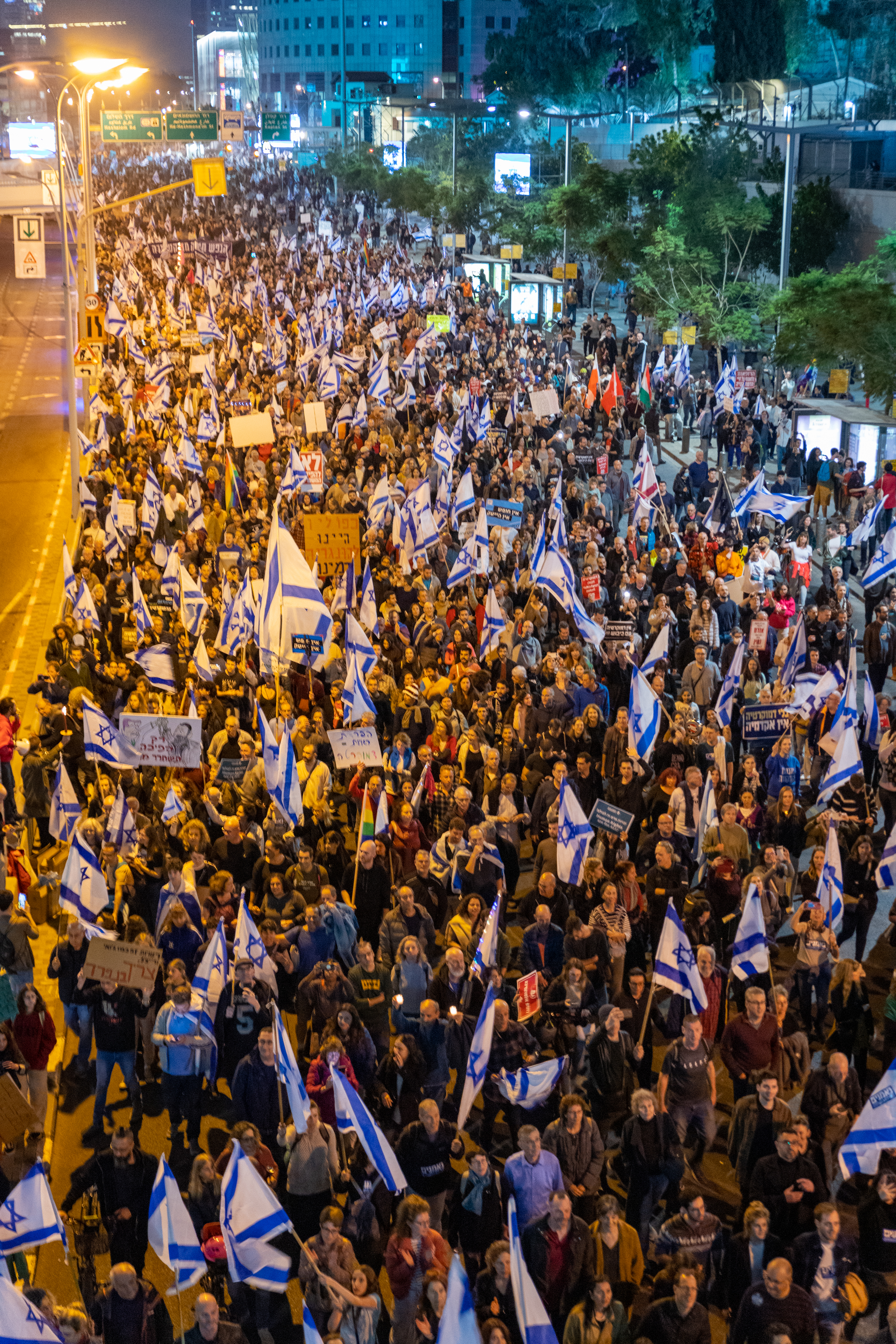
Demonstration on Begin Road in Tel Aviv, 28 January 2023

The first protest took place on 7 January in Tel Aviv's Habima Square. It was initially organized by Standing Together, a socialist Arab-Jewish organisation, as a protest against the formation of the thirty-seventh government of Israel. Following Yariv Levin's announcement on 4 January that he planned to reform Israel's judiciary, other organisations, which included Crime Minister, joined the protest, leading a concurrent march from Habima. Omdim Beyachad's protest included Ayman Odeh as a guest speaker. The combined protests included approximately 20,000 people. In the meantime, a smaller protest took place in Haifa that was attended by 200 people. On 14 January, a second protest was organized at Habima, which was attended by approximately 80,000 protesters, and was joined by smaller rallies in Haifa and Jerusalem that were attended by several thousands.

From 14 January to 11 February, protests against the reform were held on a weekly basis in Kaplan Street, alongside smaller protests in Jerusalem, Haifa, Beersheba, and other cities like Ness Ziona and Herzliya. The Kaplan protests were regularly attended by numbers ranging from 60,000 to 150,000 people. Protests in other cities regularly attracted smaller numbers.

=== 13–25 February ===
On 8 February, the Chairman of the Knesset's Constitution, Law and Justice Committee Simcha Rothman announced it would vote on referring several reforms to the Knesset Plenum on 13 February, including a law giving the coalition a majority on the judicial appointments committee. The previous day, several protest leaders, including former Chief of the General Staff Moshe Ya'alon and the Movement for Quality Government in Israel, announced their intention to organize a general strike and a protest outside the Knesset building on the same date, which was believed to be the vote's date before the announcement was made.

More than 100,000 people gathered for protests in Jerusalem on 13 February, while individuals in several industries, including doctors and tech workers, went on strike. That day, the Constitution committee voted 9–7 in favor of the reforms.

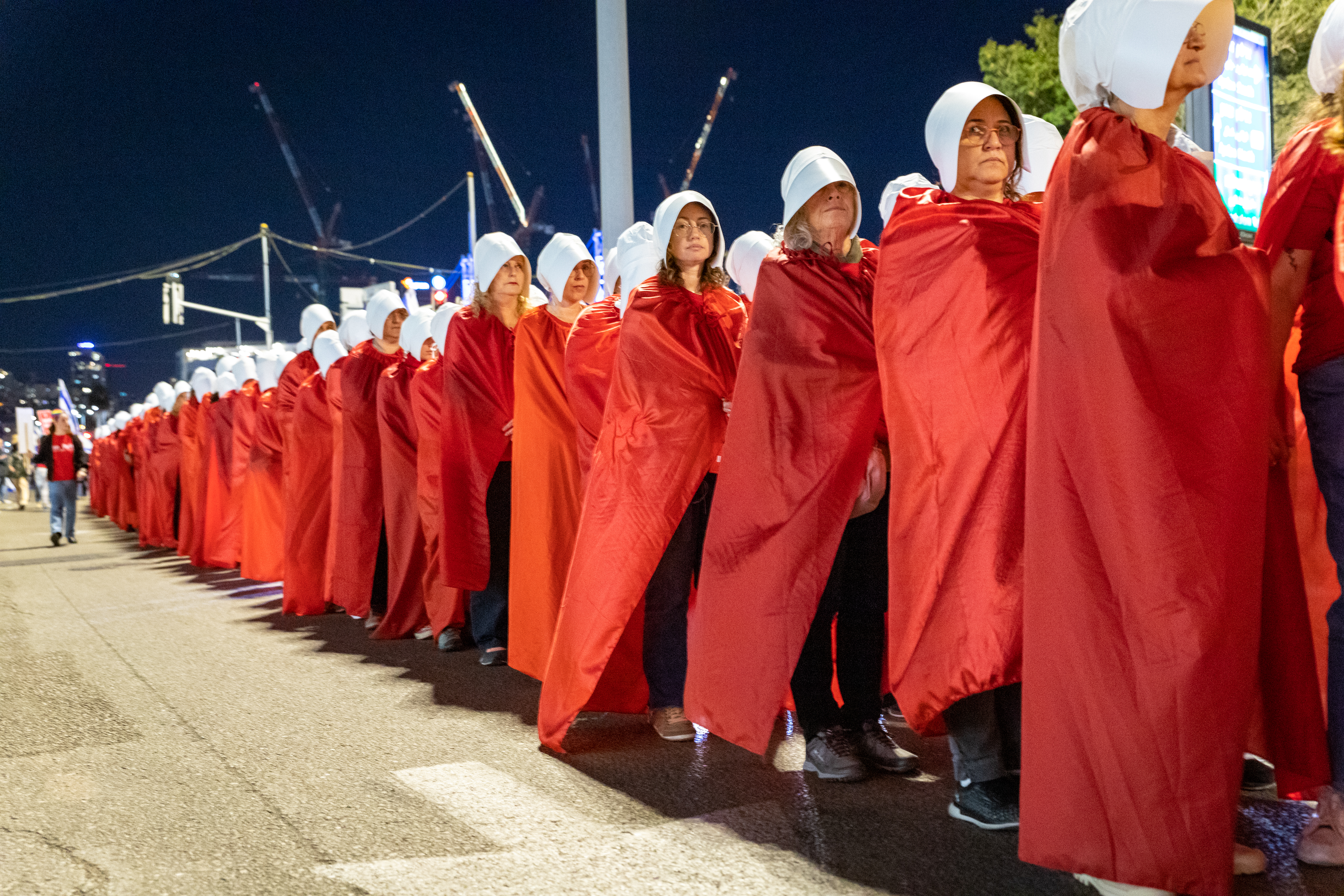
Women Building an Alternative protesters against the 2023 judicial reform

Two more weekly protests were held on Saturdays in various cities around Israel, with a central protest in Kaplan. Both numbered over 100,000. The second protest was preceded by a performance of 150 members of Women Building an Alternative wearing red-and-white outfits resembling those worn by handmaids in the television series The Handmaid's Tale. The group appeared in protest against some of the proposed legal changes, which they believe will hurt women. These protests were joined by another protest on 20 February, where over 100,000 protesters gathered outside the Knesset in Jerusalem to protest against an initial plenum vote on several reform-related bills.

=== 1–9 March ===
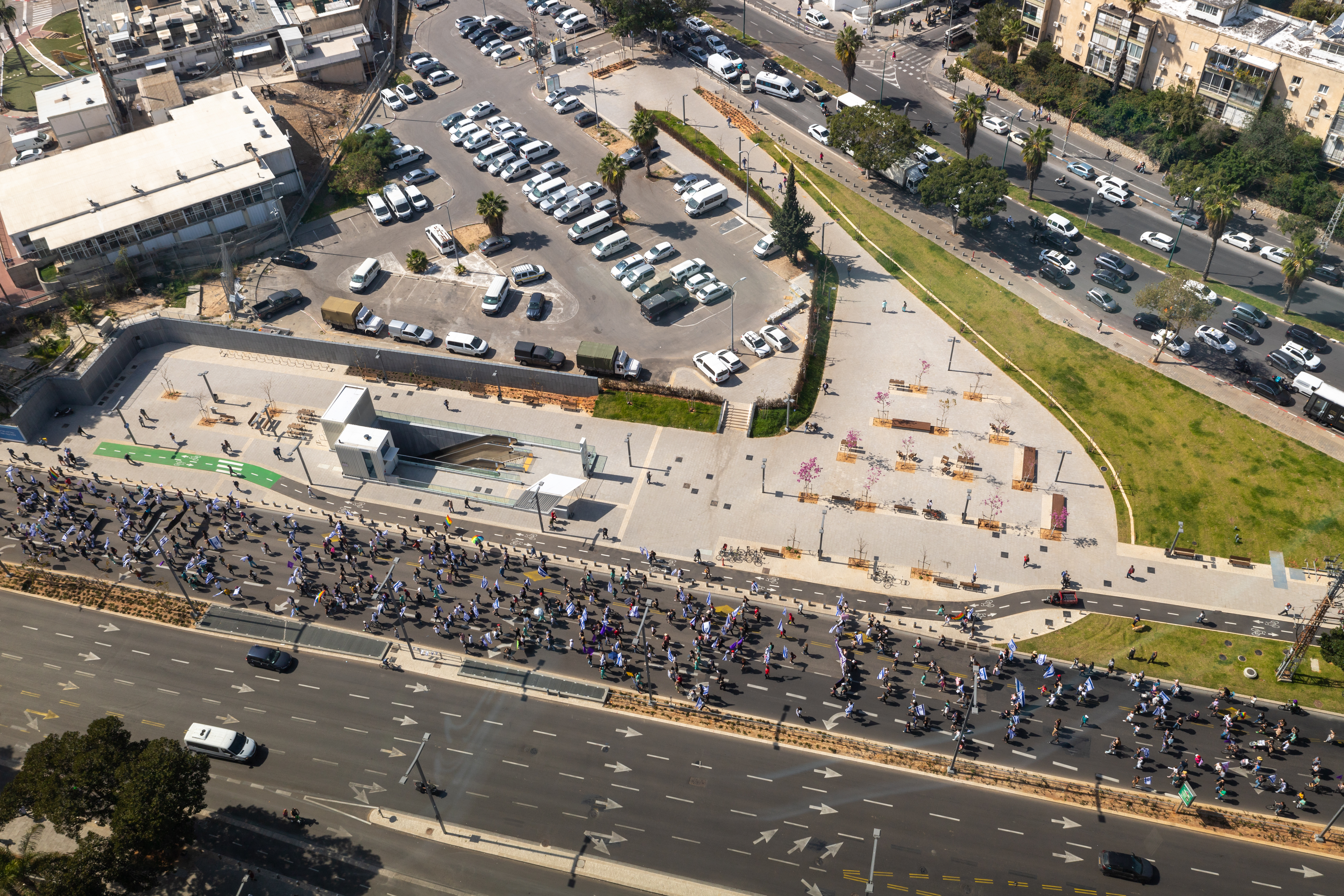
Protesters marching along Begin boulevard, Tel Aviv, 1 March 2023

1 March was designated by protest organizers as a 'national day of disruption'. Protesters tried to block Ayalon Highway in Tel Aviv, but police used stun grenades, mounted police, and water cannons against the demonstrators, and arrested several people. Netanyahu and National Security Minister Itamar Ben-Gvir both said that all protesters blocking the roads are anarchists who should be arrested. Later that evening, the Prime Minister's wife, Sara Netanyahu, was spotted at a hair salon in Tel Aviv. Protesters stood outside the salon for three hours while mounted police guarded the entrance until Netanyahu was escorted out by police.

Additional protests took place on 4 and 8 March, with Channel 12 estimating that over 160,000 people attended the former protests, while Haaretz estimated that over 25,000 attended the latter. On 5 March 2023, El Al, the national airline of Israel, announced none of the El Al pilots volunteered to fly Prime Minister Benjamin Netanyahu and his wife Sara on a state visit to Rome, in an apparent protest against his government.

On 8 March, for the occasion of International Women's Day, thousands of women dressed in red formed a human line on a beachfront of Tel Aviv to protest the planned reforms. Demonstrators at prior women's protests also dressed in red capes and white hoods, as characters from Margaret Atwood's dystopian novel The Handmaid's Tale. They condemned the government for the "Talibanization" of Israel. Protestors believe that the reform plan is "patriarchal and biased" and that women's legal rights are at stake more than they have been in years.

On 9 March, the protest movement led to what was referred to as a 'national day of resistance'. Protesters blocked roads and maritime routes, including one of the country's main highways, Ayalon, which connects all of the major traffic routes leading to Tel Aviv. Convoys of cars packed the Tel Aviv-Jerusalem highway and streamed toward Ben Gurion Airport's main terminal. The protest at the airport came hours before Netanyahu flew to Rome to meet Italian Prime Minister Giorgia Meloni. Members of "Brothers In Arms" (Hebrew: אחים לנשק), a reservist protest movement, blocked the entrance to the Kohelet Policy Forum offices in Givat Shaul with sandbags and barbed wire, in protest for their part in promoting the judicial reform. The movement's co-founder, Ron Scherf, was arrested and detained for questioning following the demonstration.

=== 11–25 March ===
According to Globes, between 150,000 and 240,000 people protested in Tel Aviv against the reform on 11 March, alongside smaller protests in other cities. Another weekly protest took place on 18 March, which was attended by over 260,000 people. Yet another protest took place on 16 March, while smaller demonstrations took place on 21 and 22 March. On 23 March, protest leaders declared a 'national day of paralysis', a series of smaller protests and demonstrations in various Israeli cities.

Another protest took place on 25 March in Tel Aviv, with over 195,000 participants according to Channel 12. Smaller protests took place in other cities such as Haifa, Beersheba and Beit Shemesh. On the same day, Israel's defense minister Yoav Gallant urged a pause in the judicial reform, stating that the growing social rift is a "clear, immediate and tangible threat to Israel's security." Gallant called for the halt before lawmakers were due to vote the following week on a central part of the government's proposals. The next day, Netanyahu announced his intention to fire Gallant.

=== Firing of Yoav Gallant and national strike ===
==== 26 March ====
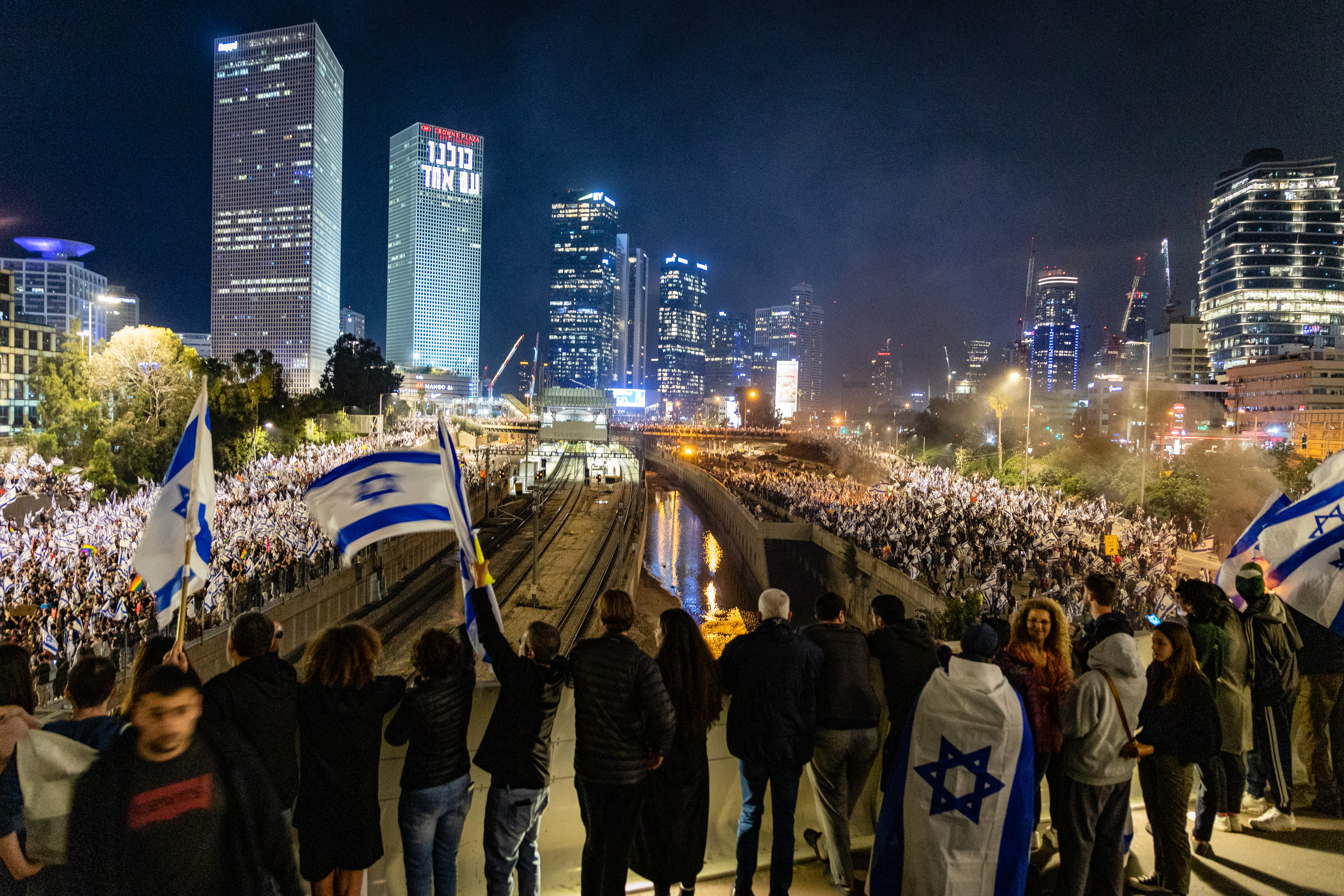
Protesters block Ayalon Highway in Tel Aviv, 26 March 2023

On 26 March, in response to the announcement of the firing of Yoav Gallant, (Note: Netanyahu announced on 10 April that Gallant would not be fired.) the Minister of Defense, hundreds of thousands of protesters blocked roads across Israel, in over 150 locations.

Asaf Zamir, Israel's Consul General in New York, resigned from his post following Gallant's dismissal in order to "stand up for what is right and fight for the democratic values I believe in". Israeli universities (with the exception of Ariel University, located in the West Bank) announced an indefinite strike, including cessation of all classes and research in protest at the government's actions. 23 local council leaders announced their intention to start a hunger strike in front of the Prime Minister's office, demanding a halt to the judicial reform.

Protesters escalated and marched towards Netanyahu's residence. There were reports of security barriers being broken down, but these reports were denied by police.

==== 27 March ====
On 27 March, Israel's President Isaac Herzog called on Prime Minister Benjamin Netanyahu to immediately halt the legislative process. He said, "for the sake of the unity of the people of Israel, for the sake of responsibility, I am calling on you to stop the legislation immediately. I turn to all the party leaders in the Knesset, coalition, and opposition as one, put the citizens of the nation above all else, and behave responsibly and bravely without further delay."

Histadrut labor federation chair Arnon Bar-David announced a general nationwide strike, followed by labor unions and major corporations announcing their participation in the strike. Protest leaders from the high-tech industry announced a complete shutdown of the country's tech industry. The leader of the Israel Airports trade union directed airport workers to shut down Ben Gurion Airport. Israel's doctors' union announced an immediate freeze of the health care system. This strike represented the "first time in the history of the State of Israel [that] the business sector, together with the Histadrut and local government, are joining forces to save the country from terrible chaos," said Dubi Amitai, the chair of the Presidium of Israeli Business Organisations. Israel's embassies in the United States and the United Kingdom shut down for the day, joining a worldwide strike of diplomats over the proposed changes to the judicial system.

Mass protests continued throughout Israel later that day, with the largest taking place in front of the Knesset. Over one hundred thousand people participated in the protest, demanding a complete stop to the legislation.

In response to increasing pressure, Netanyahu agreed to delay the judicial legislation for a month. However, protesters stated that they would continue demonstrating until the legislation was shelved entirely. In an agreement with Itamar Ben-Gvir, who threatened to resign if the legislation were to be halted, Netanyahu promised to promote the foundation of a National Guard, which was to be headed by Ben-Gvir.

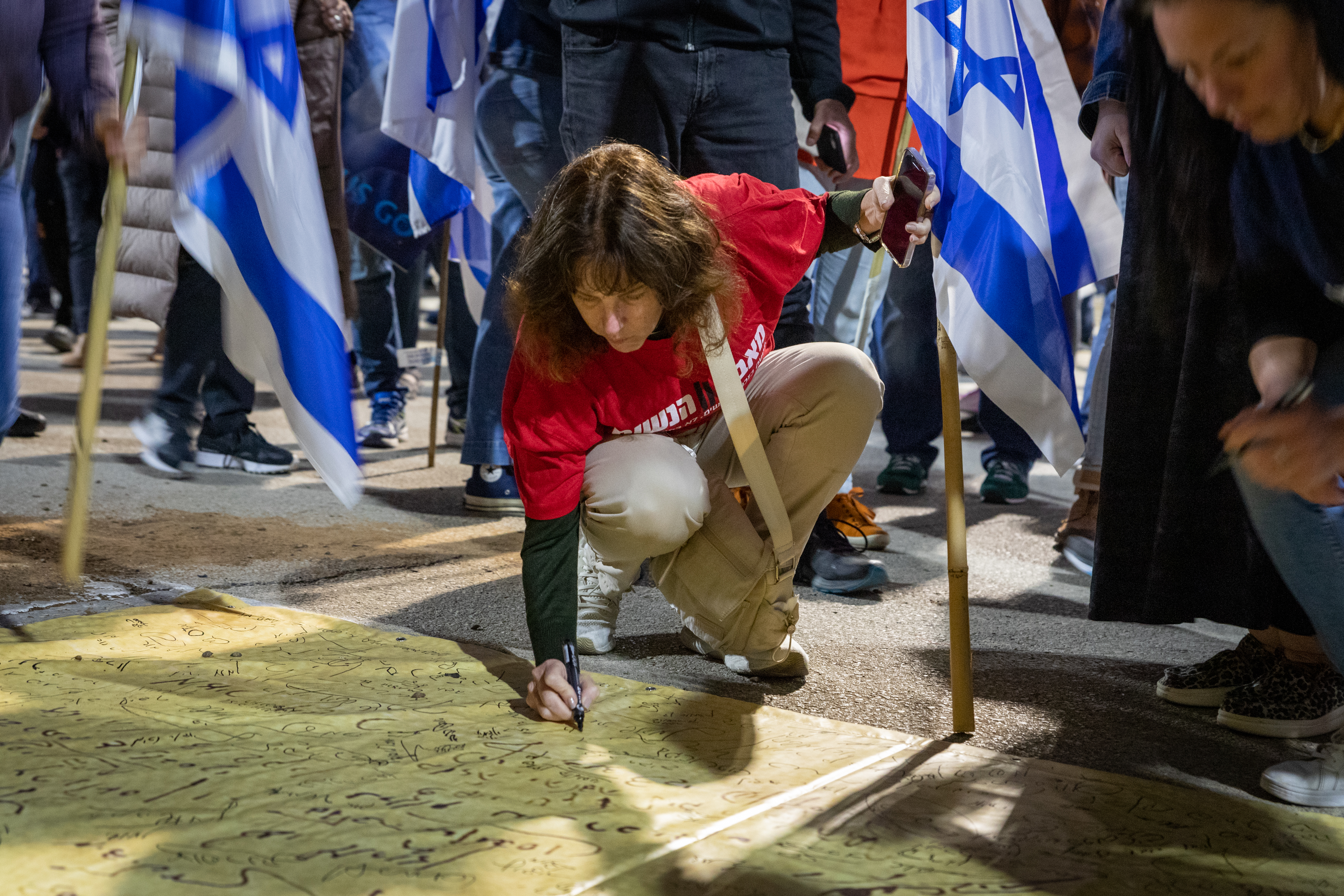
Protesters in Ra'anana signing a copy of the Israeli Declaration of Independence, 22 April 2023

=== 30 March–25 June ===
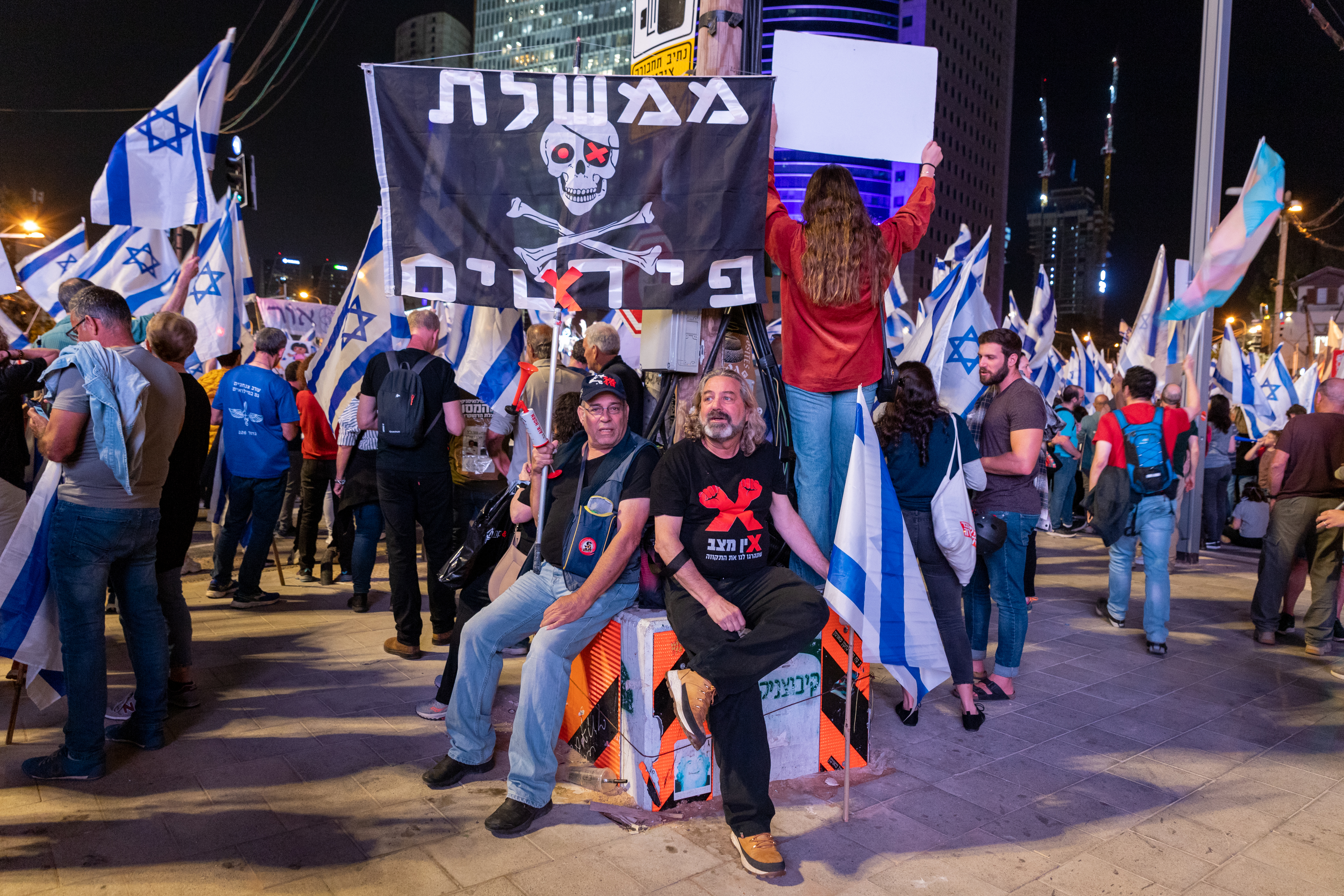
Protesters in Tel Aviv, 8 April 2023

From 1 April to 25 June, protests took place in several cities across the country on a weekly basis. The protests in Kaplan averaged between 100,000 and 200,000 people, except for 13 May, when the main protest was cancelled by the organizers due to a series of clashes between Israel and organizations in the Gaza Strip, and replaced by a smaller demonstration. Another smaller protest took place on 30 March, with additional demonstrations on 10 and 12 April. On 20 April, delegates to the World Zionist Congress from ten countries took part in a march from the congress venue in Jerusalem to Israel's Supreme Court in opposition to the reforms, while a protest took place at the Jewish Federations of North America General Assembly on 23 April.

An additional day of protests took place on 4 May, dubbed a 'national equality day' by the protest organizers. It featured nationwide demonstrations for equal treatment, especially in regard to exemption from military service given to the ultra-orthodox. Another target was the rabbinate's control over all issues relating to marriage among Jews in Israel. A protest outside Tel Aviv's rabbinical court included a group civil wedding for both straight and gay couples, all dressed in pink and standing under a pink chuppah. Israeli law does not permit civil marriage. The 20 May protests were broadened by the organizers to cover, in addition to the judicial reform, the proposed allocation of NIS 13.7 billion to coalition parties as part of the forthcoming state budget, benefitting primarily the ultra-Orthodox community, and the proposed municipal property tax fund which would transfer money from richer, mostly secular, towns to poorer, mostly ultra-Orthodox, ones.

On 10 June, around 80,000 protesters participated in the main demonstration in Tel Aviv. They were joined by thousands of others in around 150 locations around the country. Many of the events started with a moment of silence in memory of the victims of a wave of killings in the Arab Israeli community.

=== 26 June–6 October ===
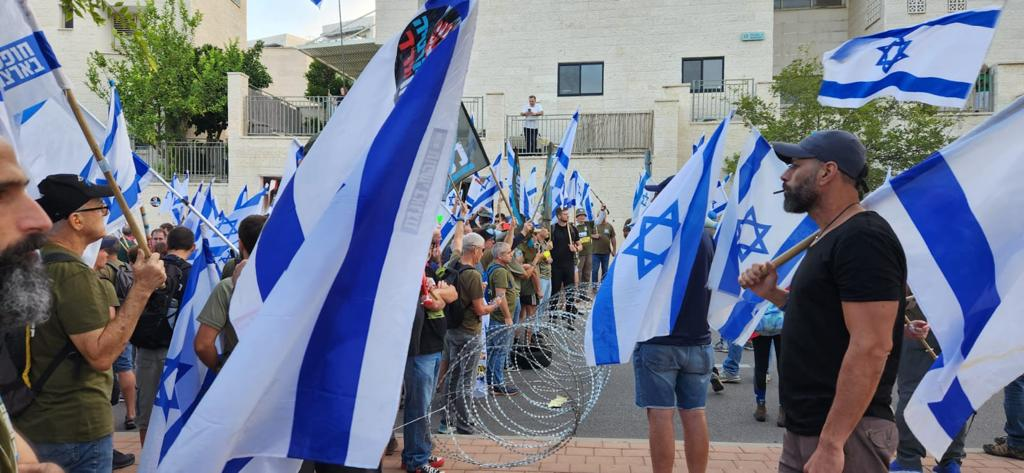
Demonstration of "Brothers in Arms" in front of the home of Justice Minister Yariv Levin in Modi'in, June 27, 2023

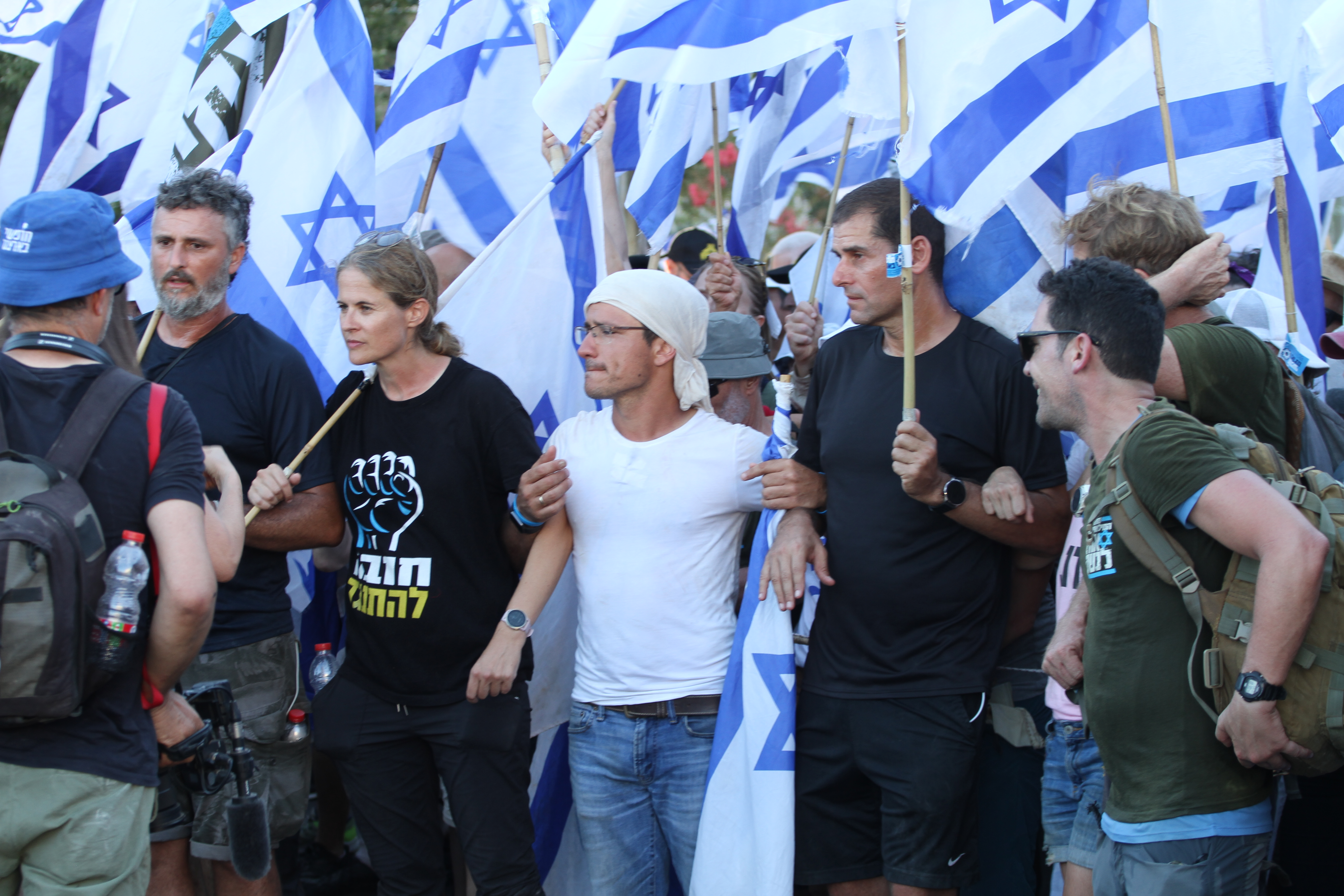
Leaders of the protest march from Tel Aviv to Jerusalem, 22 July 2023. From left to right: Ran Harnevo, Shikma Bressler, Moshe Radman, and Ami Dror

On 26 June, the Knesset's Constitution, Law and Justice Committee met to advance a bill that would revoke the reasonableness standard, which has previously been used by the courts to block certain administrative decisions by the government and other authorities. As a result, the protest movement ramped up its activities, with the protests being joined by road blockings. The weekly protests were joined by a protest on 5 July, after Tel Aviv's police chief Amichai Eshed, who was due to be demoted because of his refusal to use "disproportionate force" against the protesters, announced his resignation, and on 9 July, ahead of a scheduled reading on the reasonabless standard bill the following day.

On 27 June, over 300 IDF reservists, organised by the Brothers in Arms (Hebrew: אחים לנשק) movement, protested against the reforms outside the home of Yariv Levin. The Israeli police announced that they would investigate whether statements made by former Prime Minister Ehud Barak and former IDF Deputy Chief of Staff Yair Golan, in which they called on protesters to engage in civil disobedience, constitute sedition.

After the reasonableness standard bill passed its first reading, major demonstrations were held on 11 July with protesters taking part in another "day of disruption" by blocking inter-city highways, protesting at Ben Gurion Airport and outside the President's Residence in Jerusalem. Protesters who entered the Knesset building were forced out by security. Protesters took part in another day of disruption on 18 July, alongside additional protests on 19 and 20 July. The 19 July protests included a partial, two-hour strike by doctors of the Israel Medical Association.

On the evening of 18 July, protest leaders announced their intention to march from Kaplan Street in Tel Aviv to the Knesset building in Jerusalem. The march began with several hundred people, which became tens of thousands by 22 July. The protesters stopped in Shoresh on 21 July, before resuming the march on 22 July. According to media reports, this was one of the largest marches of its kind ever to take place in Israel.

A group of 200 Israeli tech companies announced their participation in the 23 July protests. The group, which included Wix, Wiz, Monday and Redis, chartered 100 buses to allow employees to arrive at the protests. Speaking at a demonstration in Jerusalem that day, former president Reuven Rivlin said that "the crisis is serious and real", and called on Netanyahu to "save these people from a... [potential] civil war". (Note: Originally: war among brothers (מלחמת אחים).) In the same demonstration, former President of the Supreme Court Aharon Barak said that abolishing the reasonableness cause would lead to a "grave national disaster". Former Supreme Court Justice Ayala Procaccia made a similar warning.

On 23 July, the Israel Business Forum – a group composed of the 150 largest companies in Israel, which include most private sector employees – announced it would go on strike the following day as an "emergency measure", calling on Netanyahu to "fulfill his duty" and "stop the legislation immediately". The same day, hundreds of Israeli protesters and local supporters in New York marched across the Brooklyn Bridge in protest of the overhaul.

On 24 July, the Knesset approved the first measure of the reform, which prevents judges from striking down government decisions on grounds of unreasonableness. The entire Knesset opposition boycotted the vote. The Movement for Quality Government in Israel, Association for Civil Rights in Israel and Israel Bar Association, Civil Democratic Movement and the Darkenu advocacy group all filed or planned to file petitions with the High Court of Justice against this legislation, as were various private individuals. In one demonstration after the vote, several protesters were wounded after a vehicle accelerated into them.

On 4 August, Arthur Dantchik, the main donor to the Kohelet Policy Forum, the right-wing think tank responsible for designing much of the overhaul, announced that he would cease his donations, following months of protests against him by Israelis in the Philadelphia region.

Between 17 and 18 August, protests took place at the opening of the Tel Aviv Light Rail, which included demonstrations against the reform and against public transportation not operating on the Sabbath.

On 22 September 2023, around 3,000 Israelis and American Jews protested outside the United Nations headquarters in New York City, as Netanyahu spoke before the general assembly there. Organisers called it the largest anti-government demonstration outside of Israel since Netanyahu returned to power. A group of about 200 joined the protest, calling themselves the anti-occupation bloc, carrying Palestinian flags and wearing black shirts stating "there is no democracy with occupation". They stated that the struggle against the judicial overhaul does not end with a return to a "democracy for Jews and a military regime for the Palestinians".

=== 7 October–12 October ===
On 7 October, most protests were cancelled due to the onset of the Gaza war. Some demonstrations continued despite the fighting until 12 October, when National Unity joined an emergency wartime government, freezing all new, non-emergency legislation, including the judicial reform, as part of the deal. Some groups which used to protest against the reform, such as Bonot Alternativa, decided to mobilize their supporters to aid the war effort.

== Pro-reform demonstrations ==
On 27 March, as reports surfaced that Netanyahu may delay the judicial legislation, tens of thousands of supporters of the reform arrived outside the Supreme Court, calling on the government not to fold to pressure and to keep going as planned.

On 3 April, protests in support of the reform took place outside President Herzog's residence. Protesters held signs in Hebrew stating "Benjamin Netanyahu, the people of Israel are with you."

On 15 April, amidst anti-reform demonstrations, the right-wing Im Tirtzu organization held counter-protests in support of the changes in 12 locations across the country. According to The Times of Israel, "these did not appear to draw large crowds", while according to Channel 14 the counter-protests attracted thousands of supporters, and according to Arutz Sheva they attracted tens of thousands.

On 19 April, around 300 right-wing protesters gathered outside the home of former Israeli Supreme Court President Aharon Barak, in support of the proposed judicial changes. In response to these protests, thousands gathered there the next day in a show of support for him and in opposition to the government's plan to weaken the judiciary. Barak went out to meet the crowd, who chanted "thank you" to the 86-year-old retired judge.

On 22 April, thousands of counter-protesters demonstrated in support of the judicial reform, including at the Shilot intersection near the entrance to the city of Modi'in, at the Karion intersection in Kiryat Bialik, and at the Kfar Ganim mall in Petah Tikva, as well as in other cities like Rosh HaAyin, Ashkelon, and Hadera. In Rosh HaAyin, the protesters dressed up as Yemenite slaves and performed an act with working tools.

On 27 April, around 200,000 supporters (according to The Jerusalem Post, the Jewish Telegraphic Agency, and police estimates quoted by The Times of Israel) of the government's legal reform gathered outside the Knesset in Jerusalem. The speakers included Yariv Levin, Simcha Rothman, Itamar Ben-Gvir and Finance Minister Bezalel Smotrich.

On 23 July, tens of thousands of pro-reform demonstrators gathered in Kaplan Street. Speakers at the demonstration included Miri Regev, Galit Distel-Atbaryan and Smotrich.

== Connection to the Israeli–Palestinian conflict ==
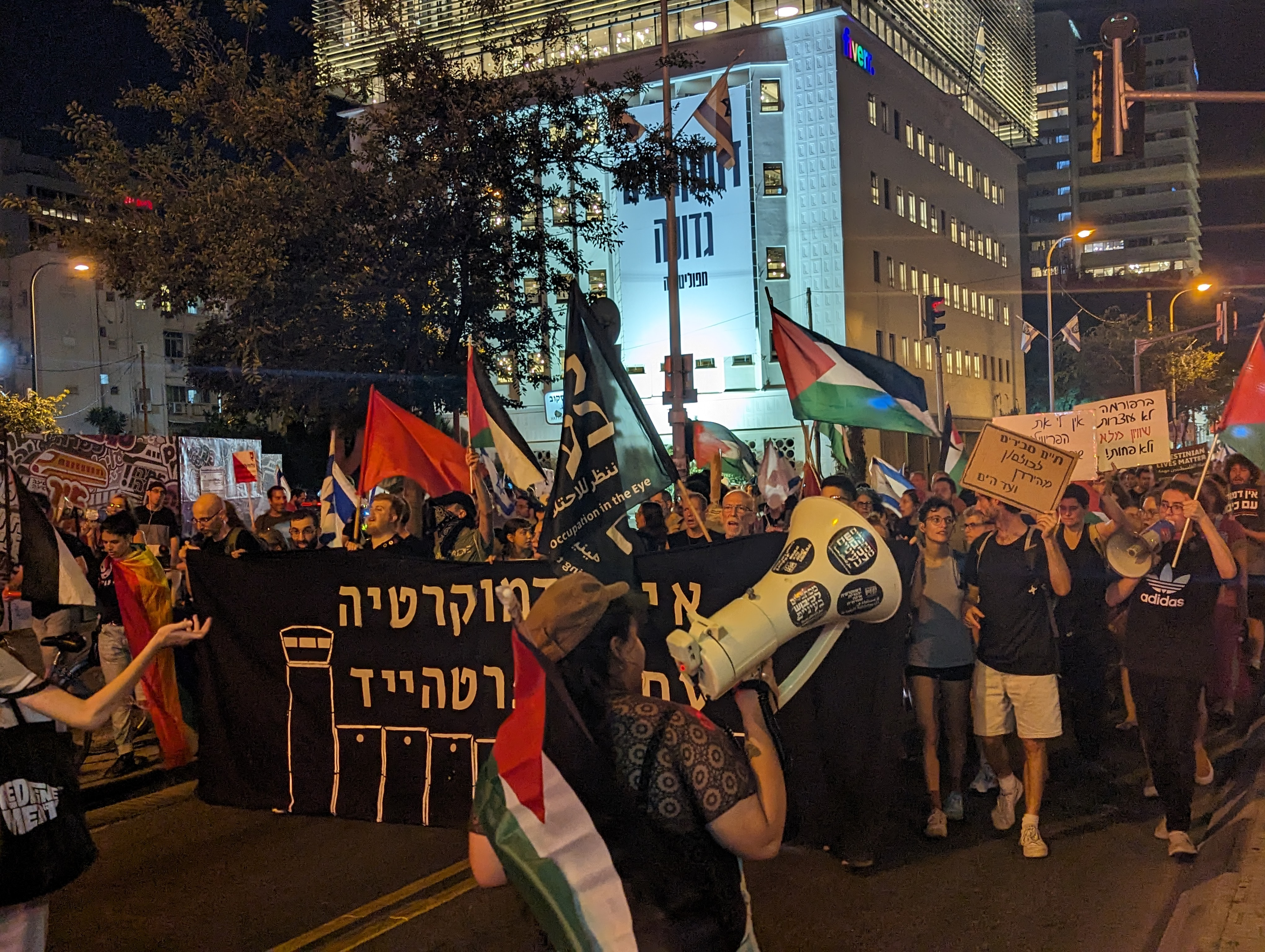
The Anti-Occupation Bloc at the judicial reform protests, 18 July 2023

Since the beginning of the protest movement against the judicial reform, the link between it and the Israeli–Palestinian conflict was a subject of debate.

The Times of Israel wrote that protesters were faced with a continuous question of "how much, if at all, should the demonstrations focus on Palestinian rights?" The debate on what implications the judicial overhaul would have for the Palestinians were discussed on articles and opinion pieces on Vox, Foreign Policy, and Haaretz. Some observers have argued that the reform and the Israeli occupation of Palestinian territories are connected, and that the Israeli government promotes the reform in order to further entrench the occupation. Some also argued that the framework of a formal Israeli constitution, a demand of the protesters, would not be achievable until Israel's strategy in the West Bank and Gaza Strip is changed.

On 9 August 2023, hundreds of Israeli and American academics published a statement claiming that the ultimate purpose of the judicial overhaul was to "annex more land, and ethnically cleanse all territories under Israeli rule of their Palestinian population". The statement characterised that the Palestinian population in the West Bank and Gaza as living under apartheid, and it criticized Jewish American leaders for paying insufficient attention to this "elephant in the room." It also called on them to directly support the Israeli protest movement, while also calling on the protest movement to embrace equality for Palestinians and Jews within Israel and the occupied territories. The initial 800 signatories include Jewish American academics, Israelis, Palestinians, religious leaders, and lawyers. Prominent Israeli signatories included historians Ilan Pappé and Benny Morris, and former speaker of the Knesset Avraham Burg.

On 3 September 2023, Youth Against Dictatorship released an open letter signed by 230 Israeli high school students in Tel Aviv, who collectively refused to serve in the IDF, citing their opposition to the judicial reform and a refusal to serve Israeli settlements. One of the group's members told Haaretz that the overhaul had led them to connect the reform to the occupation after looking at the politicians pushing the reform, who are all settlers: Smotrich, Rothman and Ben-Gvir.

On 9 September 2023, a statement signed by over 3,500 Israeli academics, artists, writers and former officials called on U.S. President Joe Biden and United Nations Secretary-General António Guterres to avoid meeting with Netanyahu, claiming that the ruling government undermined Israeli democracy and was "ignoring the historical conflict that is tearing Israel apart – the forceful domination of the Palestinian people."

== See also ==
=== Israel ===
- 2018–2022 Israeli political crisis
- 2020–2021 protests against Benjamin Netanyahu
- 2023 Eritrean clashes in Tel Aviv
- Gaza war protests in Israel
- Outline of the Gaza war
- Thirty-seventh government of Israel

=== General or elsewhere ===
- Protests against Polish judiciary reforms
- State capture, takeover by interest groups
