= Movement for Quality Government in Israel =

Israeli civic watchdog group

- התנועה למען איכות השלטון בישראל
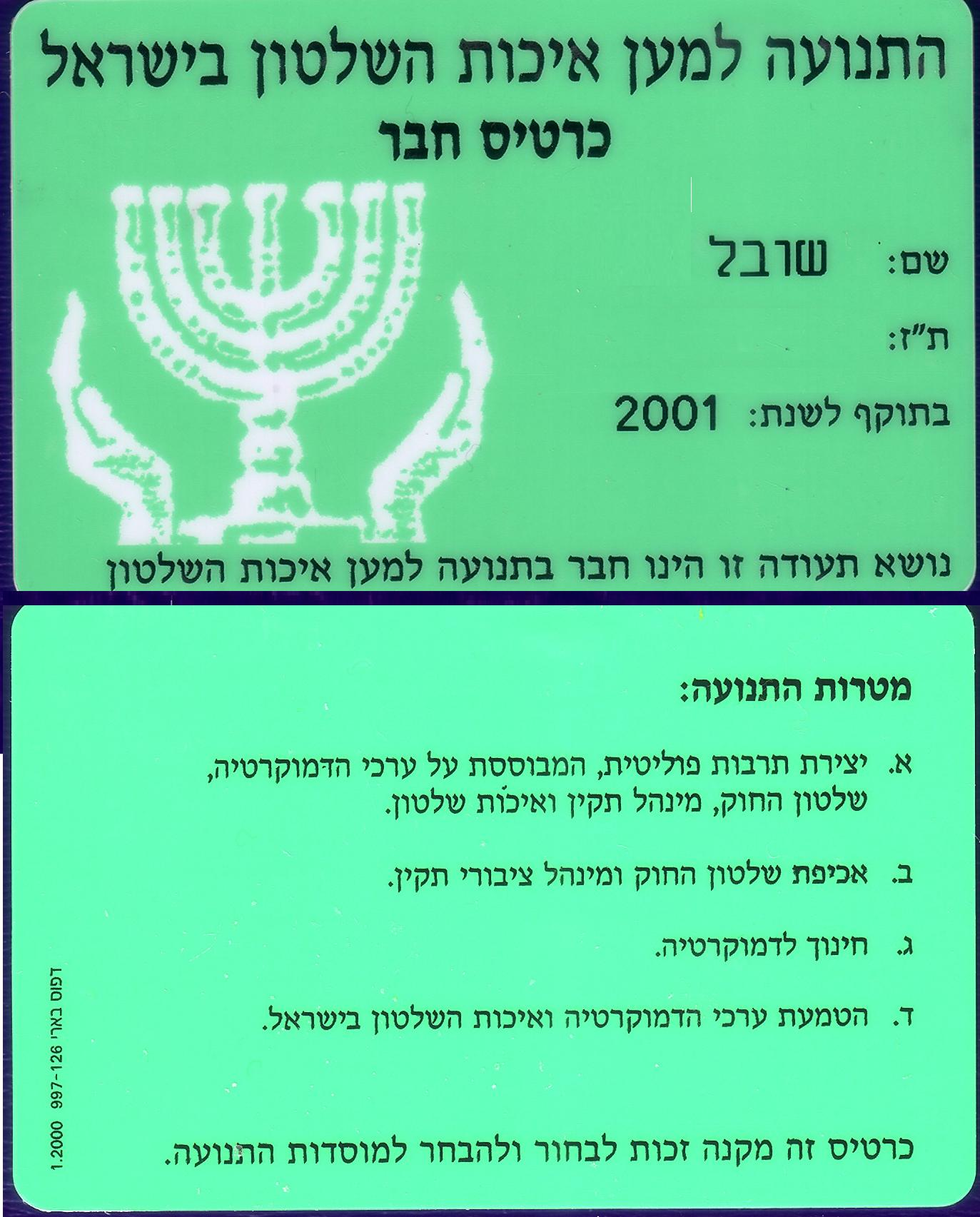
- Membership card
- Formation: March 1990
- Founder: Eliad Shraga
- Founded at: Israel
- Purpose: Advocating for quality government and anti-corruption measures

The Movement for Quality Government in Israel (Hebrew: התנועה למען איכות השלטון בישראל, HaTenu'a Lema'an Ekhut HaShilton BeYisrael) is a non-profit organization promoting democracy, ethics and good governance in Israel. It is a regular and longstanding petitioner of the Supreme Court of Israel.

The organisation was founded in March 1990 by lawyer Eliad Shraga, initially as a protest movement during the coalition crisis. It created a yearly "Knight of Quality Government" award, with categories including executive, judiciary, legislative, local government, media and military/security.

In 2020 the group unsuccessfully petitioned the Supreme Court of Israel to bar Benjamin Netanyahu from power. It opposed the 2023 Israeli judicial reform, and led protests against the proposals. The organisation petitioned against various parts of the reforms, with the High Court ruling in its favour in January 2024 over removing the ability of courts to strike down amendments to basic laws. Later in 2024, amid the Gaza war, it successfully petitioned for the government to implement immediate drafting of Hardei yeshiva students.
