= Maayan Loeub =

- מעיין לאוב
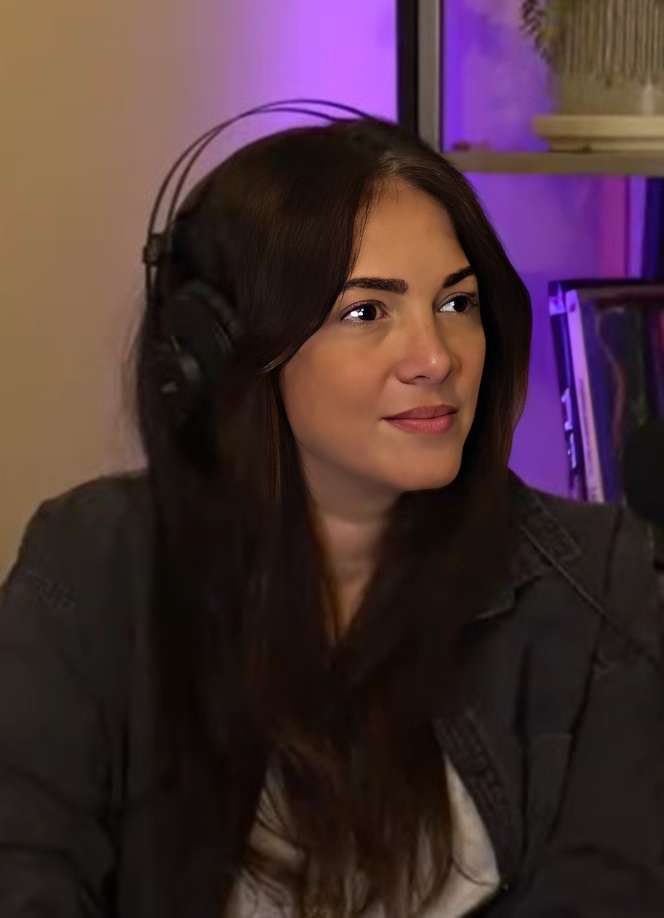
- Loeub in 2024
- Born: 15 May 1981 (age 44); Kfar Saba, Israel
- Occupations: Actress; podcaster
- Years active: 2009–present

Maayan Loeub (Hebrew: מעיין לאוב; born 15 May 1981) is an Israeli actress and web host.

== Biography ==
Maayan Loeub was born in Kfar Saba to parents who immigrated as children from Morocco. Her mother was one of the founders of the Oded movement (a movement that operated in France with the aim of bringing intellectuals from North Africa to Israel), and was active in the Da'sh party and the Black Panthers.

As a teenager, she was active in both the Working and Learning Youth Movement and the Tzomet Youth Movement.

She studied theater in high school, and during her military service in the Intelligence Corps, she began studying at the Nissan Nativ preparatory school.

Loeub is a graduate of the Kibbutzim College School of Acting (2007) and has a BA in Criminology, Psychology and Security from Bar-Ilan University with honors (2024) and is an MA student in Criminology.

== Career ==
In 2009, she participated in the music video for the song "And I Wanted You to Know" by singer Shiri Maimon as her best friend who is in love with her.

In 2012, she participated in the second season of Asfor, a series by Hanan Savyon and Guy Amir, as Maya.

In 2015, she participated in the third season of "Polishok" as Avisag, Boli Bobes's media consultant, who is having an affair with him, in the series "Atlantica" by Oded Davidoff as Maya, and in Seyed Kashua's series "The Scriptwriter".

In 2017, she participated in the series "Naor's Friends" by Naor Zion. In 2020, she participated in the series "To Pass the Night" and "Tehran".

In parallel with her acting career, she also worked in sound production and commercials.

In 2020, with the outbreak of the Corona virus pandemic, she found a job as an application coordinator at the company "Etz Hadaat: The Center for Medical Cannabis", which accompanies people in the process of obtaining a cannabis license.

Starting in February 2023, she began uploading satirical videos against the Israeli government and Prime Minister Benjamin Netanyahu, videos that became very popular after the outbreak of the Iron Swords War.

In January 2024, she began hosting the podcast "Am Yisrael Chai" with Ran Harnevo as part of "Yalla Tikva".
