= Reasonable person model =

Form of psychological framework

The reasonable person model (RPM) is a psychological framework which argues that people are at their best when their informational needs are met. Positing that unreasonableness is not a human trait, but rather the result of environment (context and circumstances), the RPM attempts to define the environments/actions that foster reasonableness, defining three key areas that assist with this: model building, being effective, and meaningful action.

The RPM was developed by environmental psychologists Stephen and Rachel Kaplan and integrates principles from environmental, cognitive, and evolutionary psychology.

== Overview ==
The RPM is a psychological framework that posits human functioning is improved when the following three domains of informational needs are met:

- Model building – RPM posits that a central informational need is to build mental models (also known as cognitive maps) in order to function effectively in the world. It suggests that mental models help people recognize objects and circumstances, predict and evaluate possible future outcomes and decide on actions.
- Being effective – This focuses on helping people utilize knowledge effectively by developing the necessary skills, also maintaining a clear head in order to function effectively.
- Meaningful action – RPM suggests that people wish to use their skills to make a difference, meaning they wish to be listened to and be given opportunities to participate.

RPM states that an environment or context supportive of informational needs can foster reasonable behavior that will "bring out the best in people".

== Conceptualizing reasonableness ==
The use of the term reasonable in RPM has commonalities and differences with the colloquial use of the word. In RPM, reasonableness refers to the ways in which "one would hope people behave". The concept is partially conveyed by what it is not, unreasonable states such as incivility, aggression, irritability and impatience. Examples may also include "...demanding fairness for oneself while denying it to others, displaying intolerance and disrespect for others, willingness to harm or kill because of differences in beliefs, and attempting to extract the earth's resources for personal gain without regard for the needs of future generations".

=== Comparison to theories on rationality ===
The RPM may be viewed as a contrary theory to rational man theory (also known as Homo Economicus) or related rational choice theory, in that it describes a landscape of mutual dependencies, such as the manner in which people treat one another. RPM assumes that information is often misunderstood, overwhelming, and unavailable. It also assumes that people are not interested in maximizing personal gain, but rather satisficing. RPM further asserts that people often have multiple concerns which cannot be reduced to a single monetary value.

=== Comparison to subjective well-being ===
Reasonableness shares some themes with subjective well-being, including emphasis on positive/negative affect and quality of life. However, whereas SWB addresses self-directed feelings, RPM also considers the contexts that foster civil behavior and improve relationships between people.

== Model building ==
The world, as William James described it, is a "blooming buzzing confusion". Mental models are neural structures, made of neurons and synapses, that organize our experiences into a usable form and allow us to

1. recognize objects, situations, and other patterns,
2. predict possible future outcomes,
3. evaluate those outcomes offline, and
4. take appropriate action. In 1943, Kenneth Craik described these affordances:

"If the organism carries a "small-scale model" of external reality and of its own possible actions within its head, it is able to try out various alternatives, conclude which is the best of them, react to future situations before they arise, utilize the knowledge of past events in dealing with the present and future, and in every way to react in a much fuller, easier, and more competent manner to the emergencies which face it."

=== Mechanisms of model building ===
Mental models are built through repetition, variation, and association. Experiencing something multiple times is said to lead to an internal representation. Experiencing sequences of things associates our internal representations in a mental map according to how those things occur in reality. Donald Hebb's rule put it as: Things that fire together, wire together.

== Being effective ==
This refers to the skills needed over and above basic knowledge to accomplish goals and refers to a state of mind that is capable of attending to and managing information. Lack of clearheadedness is described within attention restoration theory, which states there are two attentional systems: one for attending to naturally fascinating stimuli and another that allows us to intentionally direct our attention. Richard Louv's notion of nature deficit disorder describes some of the symptoms associated with a younger generation who do not spend time outdoors.

== Meaningful action ==
RPM's third domain argues that people have a desire to use their knowledge and skills to make a difference. Fewer people have work that is directly connected to their survival yet the evolutionary desire to make a difference remains. The inability to do so can lead to learned helplessness and feeling hopeless and alone in the face of seemingly insurmountable challenges. Such a state is not amenable to effective human functioning, yet there continues to be, as Kaplan describes, a "pervasive malaise of helplessness". Goldschmidt described what he termed The Human Career as: one in which humans are primarily seeking the respect of others". It is argued that, in participatory contexts, the most effective strategies are ones that help people feel like they can make a difference.

== Applications ==
RPM has been applied to the following domains:

- Landscape architecture
- Problem solving and service learning in youth
- Public participation in environmental projects
- Mediation
- Treatment plans for breast cancer patients

== See also ==
- Bounded rationality
- Flourishing
- Self-determination theory
