= Reasonableness =

Legal concept

The concept of reasonableness has two related meanings in law and political theory:

1. As a legal norm, it is used "for the assessment of such matters as actions, decisions, and persons, rules and institutions, [and] also arguments and judgments."
2. As a regulative idea, it "requires... that all factors that might be relevant in answering a practical question be considered and... that they be assembled in a correct relation to each other in order to justify [a judgement]."

Reasonableness should not be conflated with rationality.

== Political theory ==
Reasonableness has been discussed by political thinkers such as John Rawls (in his 1993 Political Liberalism), T. M. Scanlon, Brian Barry and Georg Henrik von Wright.

== Law ==
The notion of "reasonableness" is omnipresent in European law, and has also affected "international treaties and general customs". Examples of its use can be found in canon and medieval law, suggesting roots going back to Ancient Rome.

=== Standards and doctrines ===
Standards and doctrines requiring reasonableness include:

- Reasonability
- Reasonable accommodation
- Reasonable act
- Reasonable appearance of danger
- Reasonable care
- Reasonable cause or reasonable and probable cause
- Reasonable and competent support
- Reasonable creature
- Reasonable danger
- Reasonable diligence
- Reasonable doubt
- Reasonable expectation (Legitimate expectation is sometimes called reasonable expectation.)
- Reasonable facilities
- Reasonable fitness
- Reasonable mind
- Reasonable and non-discriminatory licensing
- Reasonable person (or reasonable man)
- Reasonable person model
- Reasonable portion
- Reasonable possibility
- Reasonably practicable
- Reasonable and probable damage
- Reasonable and probable grounds
- Reasonable provocation
- Reasonable prudence
- Reasonable question
- Reasonable rates
- Reasonable regulation
- Reasonable right of way
- Reasonable skill
- Reasonable suspicion
- Reasonable time
- Reasonable use
- Reasonable wear and tear excepted
- Subjective and objective standard of reasonableness

=== Constitutional and administrative law ===
In constitutional and administrative law, reasonableness is a lens through which courts examine the constitutionality or lawfulness of legislation and regulation. According to Paul Craig, it is "concerned with review of the weight and balance accorded by the primary decision-maker to factors that have been or can be deemed relevant in pursuit of a prima facie allowable purpose".

==== Common law ====
Examples of reasonableness standards in common law jurisdictions include:

- Reasonableness simpliciter and patent unreasonableness (repealed in 2008) in Canadian law
- Wednesbury unreasonableness in English law
- Wednesbury unreasonableness in Singaporean law

==== Mixed jurisdictions ====
- Reasonableness cause in Israeli law (עילת הסבירות)
- Reasonableness in South African administrative law

=== Reasonability ===
Reasonability is a legal term. The scale of reasonability represents a quintessential element of modern judicial systems and is particularly important in the context of international disputes and conflicts of laws issues. The concept is founded on the notion that all parties should be held to a reasonable standard of conduct and has become embedded in a number of international conventions such as the UNIDROIT principles and the CISG.

The concept of reasonability is applicable to Roman law.

== See also ==
- Reason
- Reasonable person model
