= Amir Haskel =

Israeli pilot and Holocaust researcher

- אמיר השכל
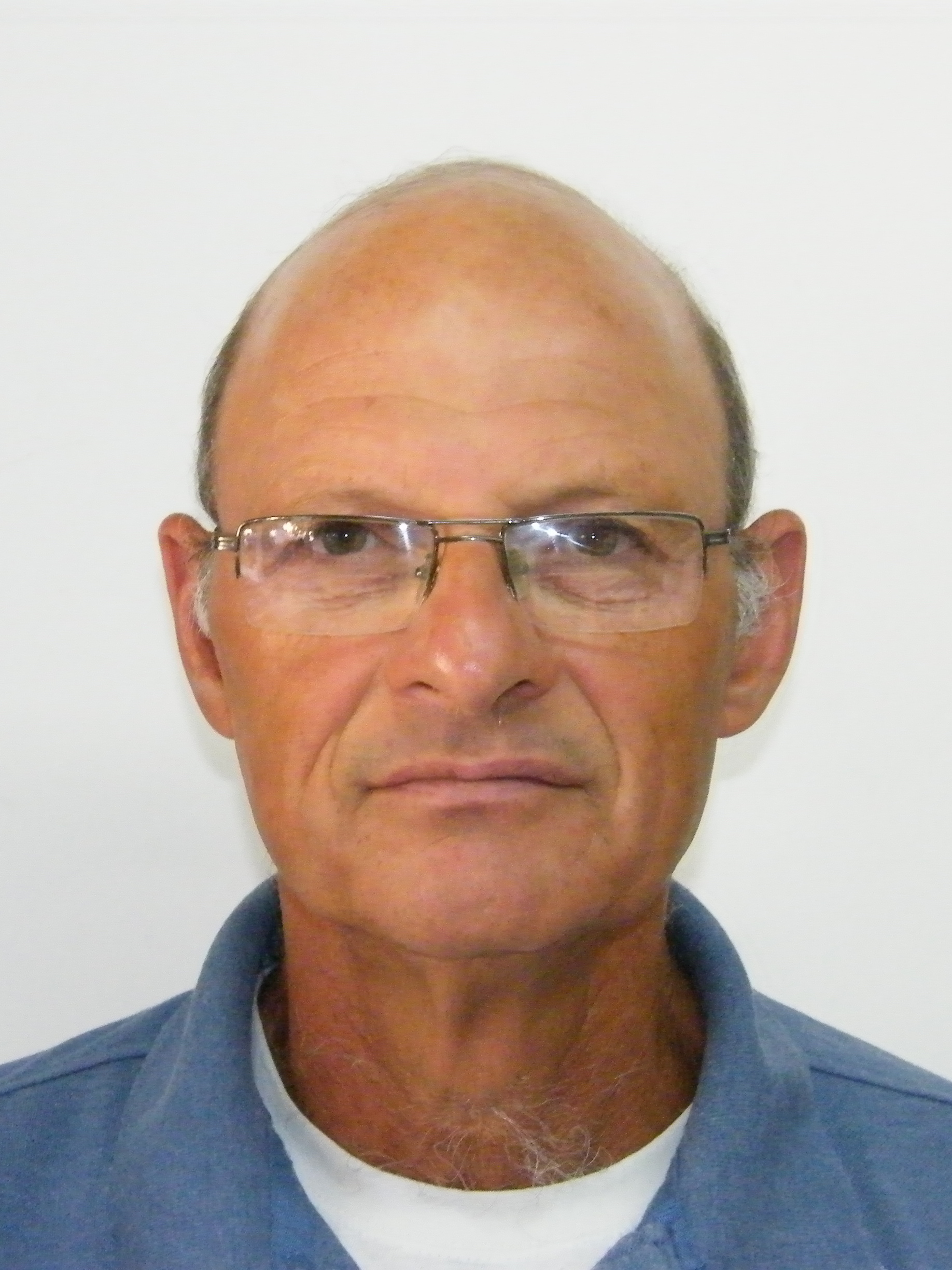

Personal details
- Born: August 9, 1953 (age 73)
- Education: University of Haifa; United States Air Force Academy
- Occupation: pilot; guide
- Known for: Air Force service; political activism; social activism; entrepreneurship

Military service
- Allegiance: Israel
- Branch/service: Israel Defense Forces
- Years of service: 1971-2002
- Rank: Tat Aluf (Brigadier general)
- Commands: 192 Squadron; 103 Squadron; Commander of Sde Dov Airport; Commander of Lod Airbase; Commander of Human Resources at Israeli Air Force

Amir Abraham Haskel (Hebrew: אמיר השכל; born August 9, 1953) is an IDF brigadier general and Air Force pilot in reserve and a researcher of the Holocaust. Haskel is one of the prominent figures in the ongoing wave of protests against Benjamin Netanyahu.

== Biography ==
Haskel was born in Jerusalem, the eldest of parents who immigrated from Poland. The families of both his parents emigrated to Israel before World War II. When he was younger, his family moved to Tel Aviv where Haskel attended Elharizi Elementary School and later attended Geula Highschool. Haskel was a member of the Aviation Club and later on, followed in his pilot cousin's footsteps and volunteered for pilots' training. Haskel began his service in the Air Force's helicopter training course and later transferred to reconnaissance and training as a transport pilot. During his training course, the Yom Kippur War broke out, during which Haskel assisted with marking, inquiring, and battle prepping. Haskel served as a Hercules pilot in the 131 squadron and took part in Operation Solomon to airlift the Ethiopian Jews of Beta Israel from Sudan to Israel. During his service Haskel commanded a Hawkeye squadron, the 103 Squadron between 1992 and 1994, Sde Dov Air Base between 1995 and 1997 and Air Base 27, the Air Force's heavy transport base, between 1997 and 1999. Between 1999 and 2002, Haskel commanded the Human Resources division.

== Holocaust research ==
As commander of the Human Resources division, Haskel, along with the IDF's Head Education commander, Elazar Stern, initiated the "Edim B'Madim" (Witnesses in Uniform) program – The IDF's Delegations to Poland, and headed the first delegation of IDF officers in 2001. His first trip to Poland lasted five days and was a meaningful event in his life. He returned with the resolve to deepen his knowledge about the Holocaust, with the question as to how it came to pass that in civilized Germany, amidst the 20th century, such an event as the Holocaust occurred. Following his retirement from the IDF, Haskel underwent a training course for guides to Poland at Yad Vashem and dedicated his time to studying the Holocaust. The first two delegations he instructed were youth delegations, during which he felt, in his words, that teenagers are not ready for a journey such as this, some "do not connect" and others experience it too harshly. In December 2004, Haskel was invited to guide IDF delegations by the headmaster of the school for the instruction of the Holocaust at Yad Vashem, Moti Shalem. Haskel visited Poland about seventy times, mainly with IDF delegations. Haskel published three books about the Holocaust, among which was a book about the German Righteous Among the Nations and also a book about Jews who rebelled against the Nazis. According to Haskel, his deep understanding from his studies about the Holocaust is the tendency of most human beings to stand idly by and about the danger in standing idly by.

== Blind Love: A Holocaust Journey Through Poland with Man's Best Friend ==
Haskel appears in the documentary Blind Love: A Holocaust Journey Through Poland with Man's Best Friend. In the film, he guides a group of blind Israelis travelling through Poland with the help of their guide dogs to learn about the Holocaust. The blind participants also take part in the March of the Living from Auschwitz to Birkenau on Holocaust Remembrance Day.

One of the locations visited in Poland was the Łopuchowo forest, where approximately 2000 Jewish residents of the nearby town Tykocin were executed, shot into pits by Nazi German soldiers in 1941. "When we arrived there, the atmosphere was very unique," Heskel said in the film. Heskel printed two eyewitness testimonies of the massacre in braille, and asked two of the participants to read them.

"Seeing them sitting and reading aloud the poems - the dogs, despite the rain, we're not making a sound. It was an extraordinarily powerful moment." During the trip, Heskel shared with his group this personal insight into the moral of the story of the Holocaust: "Education, education, education," he said, was the most important lesson of the Holocaust.

Commenting on the lesser chances Jewish people had with disabilities during the Holocaust, Haskel stated, “The first selection was for those who were able to work. Those who were not were sent directly to be killed. The fate of people who were disabled was sealed immediately.”

== Protest against the prime minister ==
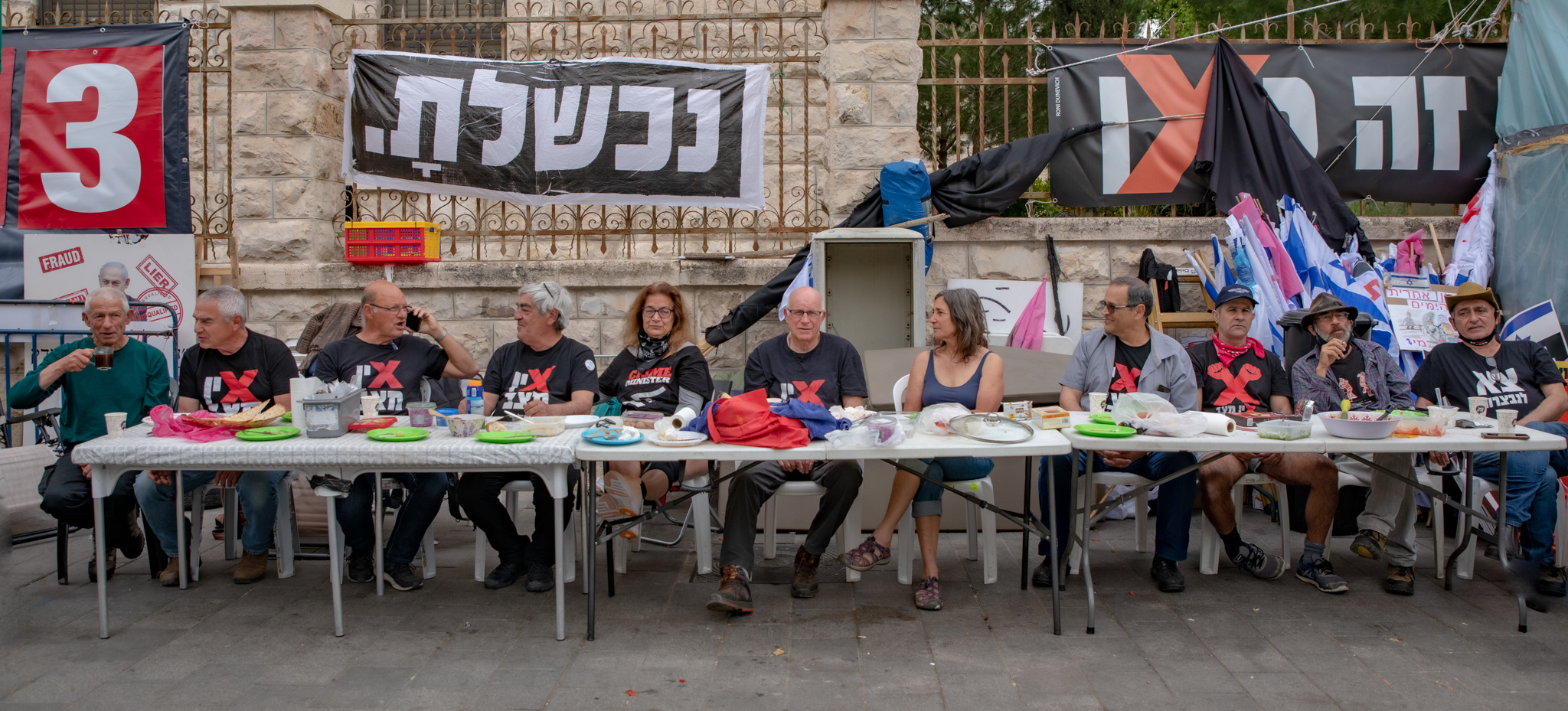
Closing of Balfour encampment of no condition, breakfast before the demolition of the encampment on March 22, 2021. Haskel is third from the left

In October 2016, Haskel began to protest against prime minister Benjamin Netanyahu, claiming that he is leading towards a bi-national state, is not furthering peace and security, is "tearing Israeli society apart", and derailing Israeli democracy using "anti-democratic legislation and attacking the press and gatekeepers". As one of the first in the "Individual Protests", Haskel protested for four years on his own and with a handful of others at various junctions, mainly at the entrance to his hometown of Yavne.

On June 11, 2020, Haskel joined Ori Nachman, who had been protesting for days near the Prime Minister's residence in Jerusalem, and, with inspiration from the George Floyd protests, initiated the "Sabbath Protests at Balfour". Haskel was joined by members of the "Individual Protest". On June 26, 2020, police came to break up a protest at Balfour Street with a few dozen protesters and arrested Haskel, who was giving a speech, claiming that protesters were blocking off the road. Haskel was arrested along with two others. They were offered to be released in exchange for a commitment to never return to Balfour Street, but they refused. The day after Haskel's arrest, hundreds marched towards the Russian Compound, where Haskel and the others had been detained. On Balfour Street, the number of protesters had reached a thousand. On the following Sunday morning, Haskel was released by the detainee judge without preconditions. In the days which followed, the number of protesters continued to rise and on July 14, a protest of thousands of people was held and was attended for the first time by youth protest movements. This event is what sparked the penultimate protests against Benjamin Netanyahu.

On June 13, 2023, Haskel was arrested by police prior to attending an economics conference in Sderot where he was protesting against ministers Nir Barkat and Yitzhak Goldknopf as part of the ongoing 2023 Israeli judicial reform protests against the government. Haskel was informed by police that he cannot go inside to attend the conference even though he had signed up for the public event on May 24, just a few weeks before. Haskel stated that the police had no right to prevent him from entering due to the fact that it was a public event that he had signed up for. Haskel was detained by police who claimed he was "interfering with public order". Later, in a police investigation, Haskel told the investigator "We are fighting for democracy - Is this democracy?". Haskel was later released under no pre-conditions.

== Personal life ==
Haskel resides in Yavne, is married to Alisa, a teacher, and the two have four children. Haskel has a master's degree in political science from the University of Haifa and also studied at the United States Air Force Academy.

== Books ==
- Haskel, Amir (January 20, 2014). The Warden of Block 11 (Paperback). Contento Now. p. 274. ISBN 978-9655502602.
- Giborim Regilim (Regular Heroes): About the German Righteous Among the Nations - (2014)
- Al Zicharon V'Shichacha: HaMikre Shel Zorin, Bielski V'Anilevish (About Memory and Forgetfulness: The Zorin, Bielski and Anilevich Affair) – (2016)
