= COVID-19 protests in Israel =

Protests against COVID-19 lockdowns and restrictions

COVID-19 anti-lockdown and anti-vaccine protests in Israel
- Part of protests over responses to the COVID-19 pandemic
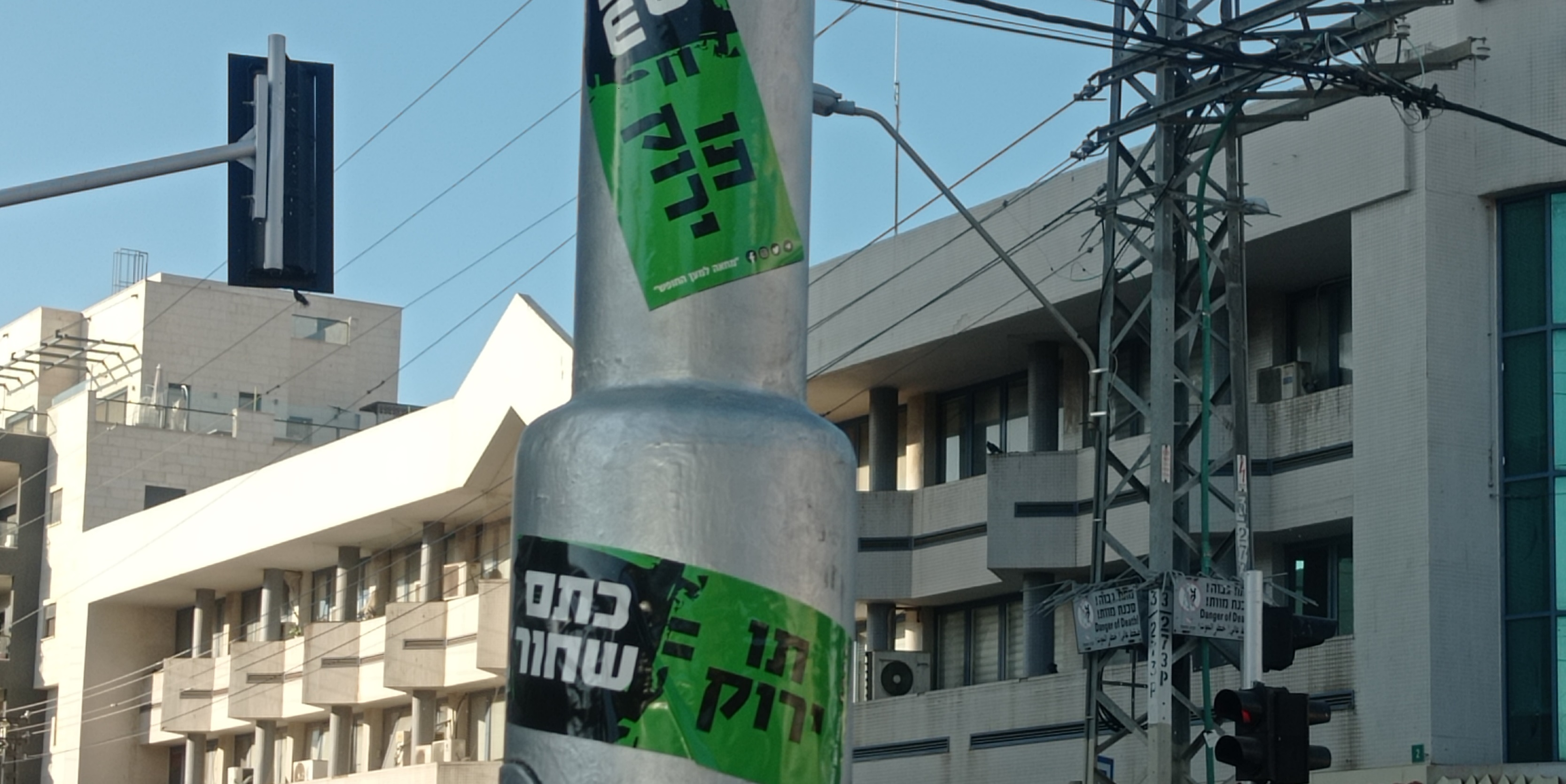
- Date: 19 April 2020–2023
- Location: Tel Aviv and several other cities
- Caused by: Opposition to the government measures against the COVID-19 pandemic in Israel
- Goals: Ending COVID-19 restrictions in Israel
- Methods: Protests; Defying social distancing; Opposition to mandatory vaccination; Opposition to Green Pass; Civil rights and equality
- Result: End

Protests over COVID-19 policies in Israel refer to the series of protests by various social and political groups since April 2020. The protests are opposing lockdowns, mandatory vaccines, government restriction policies and vaccinations in general. The protests coincided with similar demonstrations and riots worldwide, though some of the earlier protests were linked to the specific 2019–2021 Israeli political crisis.

From August 2021, the protests began organizing into a more cohesive structure, aligning several previously separate movements. From December 2021, the protests epicenter moved from Tel Aviv to the city of Raanana, the place of Prime Minister's residence.

== Background ==
In the summer of 2020 during mass demonstrations in front of the Prime Minister's official residence, the Israeli police used the kettling tactic several times and prevented demonstrators wishing to leave the demonstration compound from leaving. Criticism had been leveled at the fact that the tactic is used to deter protesters from reaching the protest and due to the dangerous high-density it creates in the context of the COVID-19 pandemic.

The protests against Benjamin Netanyahu concluded after the thirty-sixth government of Israel, headed by Naftali Bennett and Yair Lapid in a power-sharing agreement, was sworn in on 13 June 2021, ending Netanyahu's 12-year second tenure as prime minister. However, protests against the new government's handling of the pandemic soon followed.

== Early unorganized protests ==
=== April 2020 ===
In April 2020, thousands of Israelis engaged in social distancing while gathering to protest against the believed anti-democratic measures in the country by Prime Minister Benjamin Netanyahu. Many were involved in the Black Flag movement which had been allowed to protest by police if they stood six feet apart and all wore masks. An earlier protest had seen the protesters drive to Jerusalem to protest anti-democratic measures.

Other demonstrations were seen in the ultra-Orthodox Jerusalem neighborhood of Mea Shearim with men and youths throwing rocks at police before being arrested.

=== January 2021 ===
Riots broke out in Bnei Brak with crowds vandalizing property and throwing rocks against police attempts to clear yeshiva classes and religious gatherings being held in violation of lockdown rules.

=== February 2021 ===
Hundreds of ultra-Orthodox lockdown protesters clashed with police in Jerusalem, opposing to COVID-19 restrictions, while burning trash bins and throwing stones at police, who disperse crowd with water cannons.

== Emergence of organized movement ==
=== July 2021 ===
On 23 July 2021, dozens of protesters gathered around Prime Minister Bennett's home in Ra’anana, in central Israel, blocking traffic, shouting and engaging in scuffles with security forces. Police arrested five people for disturbing the peace and refusing orders.

On 31 July, demonstrations took place in Tel Aviv expressed anger over reimposed health orders in heavily vaccinated country. The protests were the largest to date.

=== August 2021 ===
It was reported that anti-vaccine movement member parents began setting separate schools for their children, as quote 'These parents have lost faith in the system and have begun to take independent action'.

=== October 2021 ===
In early October 2021, Israel tightened COVID-19 ‘green pass’ rules, sparking protests as the new criteria meant that nearly 2 million people lost their vaccination passport.

=== December 2021 ===
New vaccine pass rules for malls introduced in mid-December 2021 drew protests.

== Protests analysis ==
On 16 August 2021, Nir Hasson and Josh Breiner of Ha'Aretz speculated that unlike in most other countries where COVID-19 vaccine refusers are often conservative and religious, in Israel many of them are secular and politically liberal. They also tried to analyze the connection between the Balfour demonstrations and the fight against COVID-19 jabs. The opinion article didn't establish clear conclusions on the issue.

== Government response to protests ==
In December 2020, it was published that Facebook removed anti-vaccine 'fake news' in Israel, according to the Israeli Ministry of Justice. Reportedly, the Justice Ministry requested Facebook to take down four groups that had disseminated texts, photographs and videos with “deliberately mendacious content designed to mislead about coronavirus vaccines”.
