= 2020–2021 protests against Benjamin Netanyahu =

Public protest in Israel

- Part of the 2018–2022 Israeli political crisis
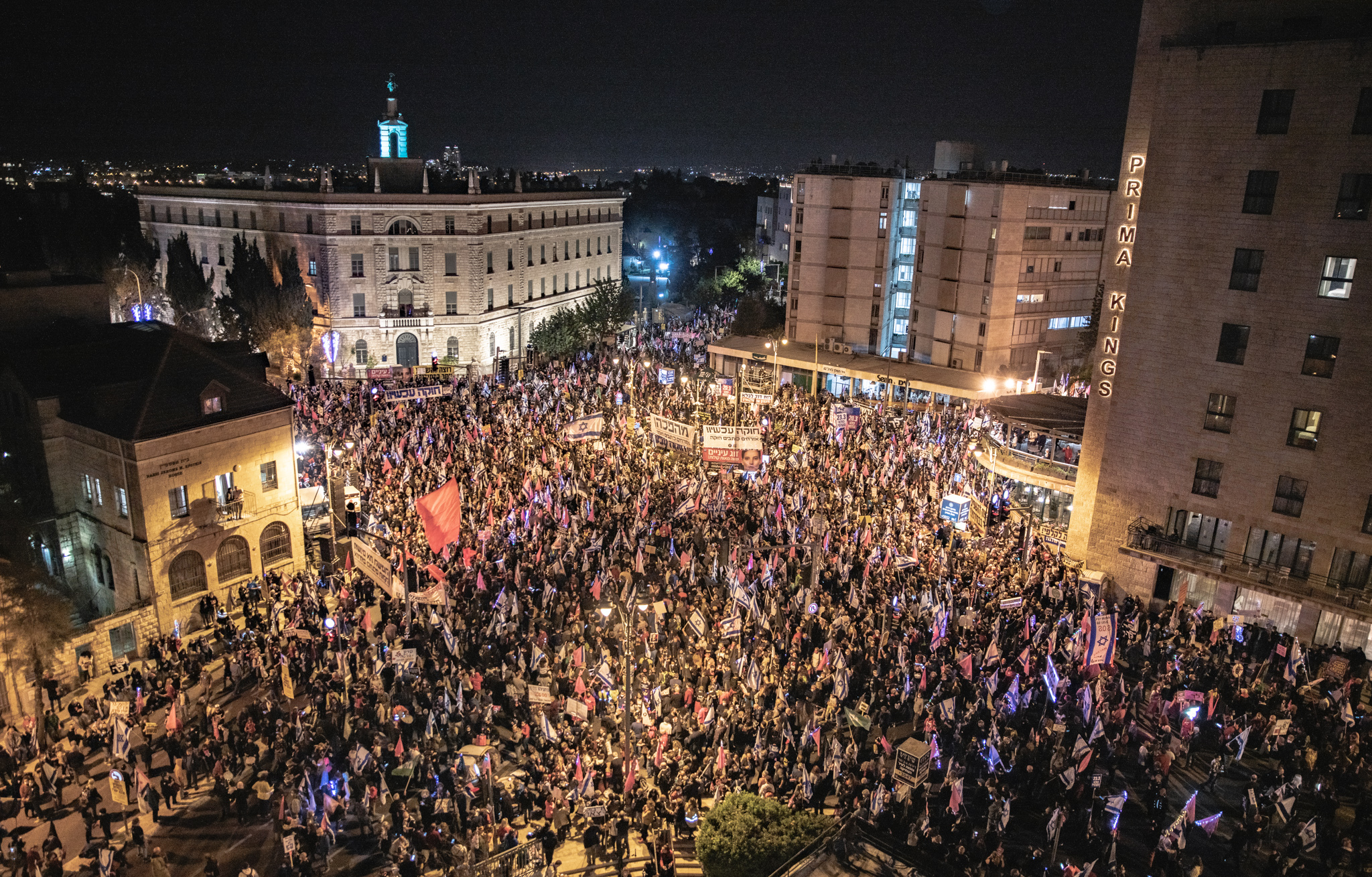
- Protests in Paris Square (Terra Santa college building in the back left, Beit Aghion is nearby), Jerusalem, 20 March 2021
- Date: March 16, 2020–June 13, 2021 (1 year, 2 months and 4 weeks)
- Location: Israel
- Caused by: 2018–2022 Israeli political crisis; Trial of Benjamin Netanyahu; COVID-19 pandemic in Israel; Corruption; Unemployment; Food price rises; Other regional protests
- Goals: Resignation of Benjamin Netanyahu
- Methods: Demonstrations; Protest art; Internet activism
- Status: Netanyahu failed to form a new government after the 2021 elections and stepped down as prime minister (June 2021)

Parties
Opposition groups	(Israel) Pro-government

Lead figures
Amir Haskel; Gonen Ben Itzhak; Roey Peleg; Or-ly Barlev; Shikma Bressler; Ishay Hadas	Benjamin Netanyahu

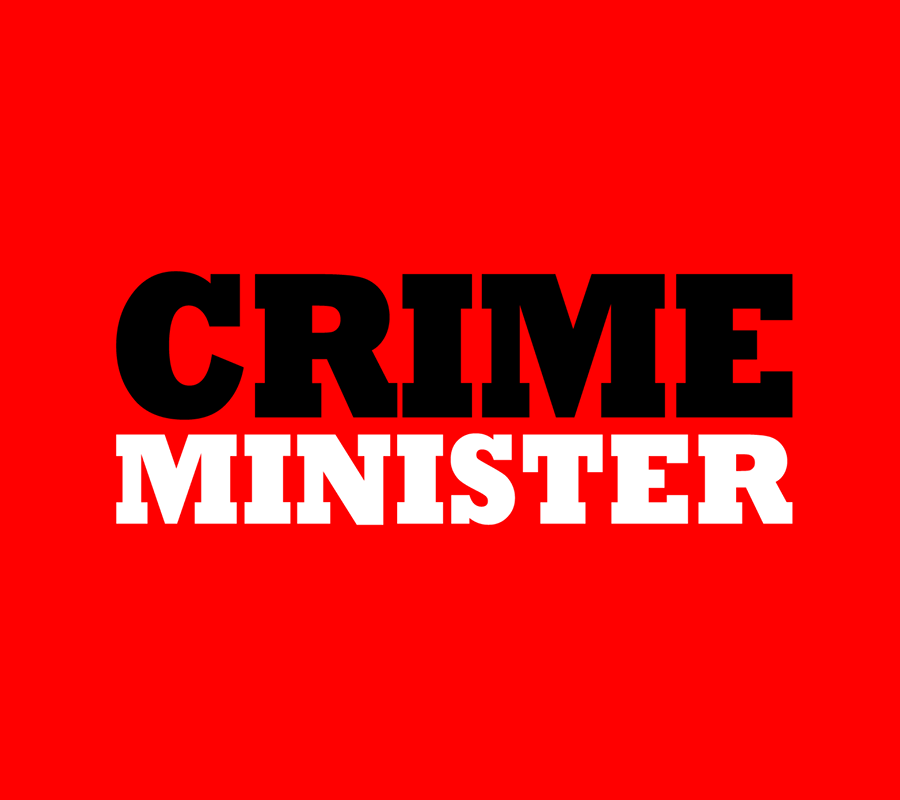
Crime Minister, one of the leading movements in the protests

A series of protests against Israeli prime minister Benjamin Netanyahu, colloquially referred to as the Balfour Protests (Hebrew: מחאת בלפור) or Black Flag Protests (Hebrew: מחאת הדגלים השחורים), gained prominence in Israel throughout 2020 and 2021, during the COVID-19 pandemic and the ongoing trial of Netanyahu for various corruption scandals. Protesters accused Netanyahu of subjecting the law as part of his fight in criminal proceedings against him. The demonstrators protested against Netanyahu's continued tenure in the shadow of his criminal charges, claims of his preference for personal good over the good of the state, and demands to investigate the "submarine affair". One of the hotspots most identified with the protests was the compound near the prime minister's residence, on Balfour Street in Jerusalem. The protests concluded after the thirty-sixth government of Israel, headed by Naftali Bennett and Yair Lapid in a power-sharing agreement, was sworn in on 13 June 2021, ending Netanyahu's 12-year second tenure as prime minister.

== Background ==
In the summer of 2016, the "individual protest" began by a small group of citizens. In December 2017, the protesters initiated a demonstration in Tel Aviv and a parade on Rothschild Boulevard, against the "French Law" which were intended to thwart the possibility of filing indictments against Netanyahu. The demonstration was called the "Shame Parade" and was attended by tens of thousands of people.

== Protest convoys ==
After the 23rd Knesset elections, President Reuven Rivlin imposed the Government formation on a Blue and White, Benny Gantz. Outgoing Knesset Speaker Yuli Edelstein refused to vacate his seat as the chairman and prevented the establishment of parliamentary committees, including a committee to discuss the parliamentary immunity of Netanyahu. Following this, the "Black Flags" protest broke out in March 2020.

Shikma Bressler and her brothers Eyal and Yarden Schwartzman, initiated protest convoys to the Knesset, as well as demonstrations near the homes of parliamentary members of the Israel Resilience Party. Former Prime Minister Ehud Barak rallied and called on social media to wave black flags from balconies and windows. On 16 March, he wrote, "When there are a million of them on every window and balcony, the defendant will go home. The court will not be closed and the Knesset will not be closed. We, the citizens, cannot go through with it".

== Events ==
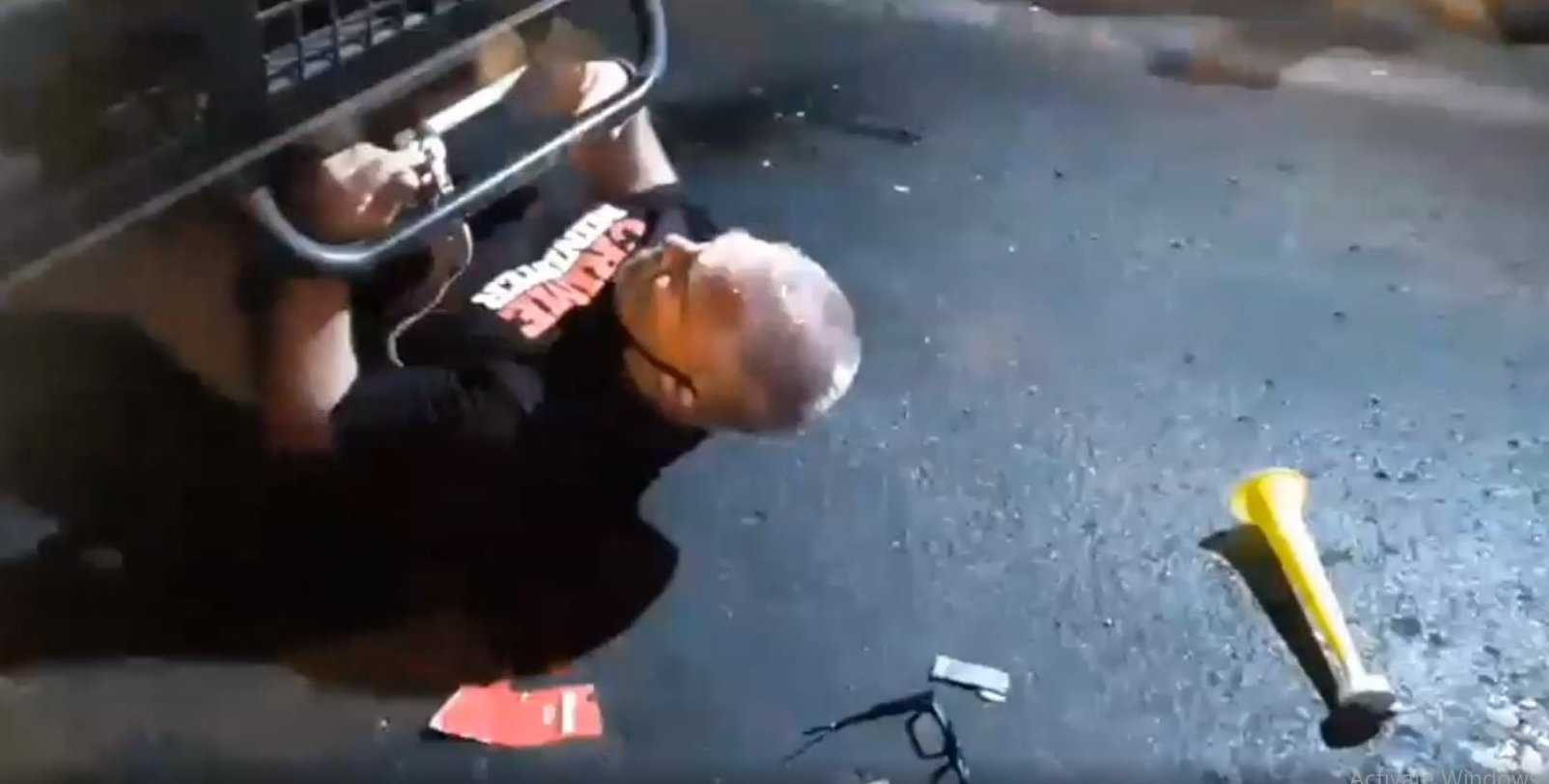
Gonen Ben Itzhak laying down under a water cannon in order to prevent protesters from getting injured, 18 July 2020

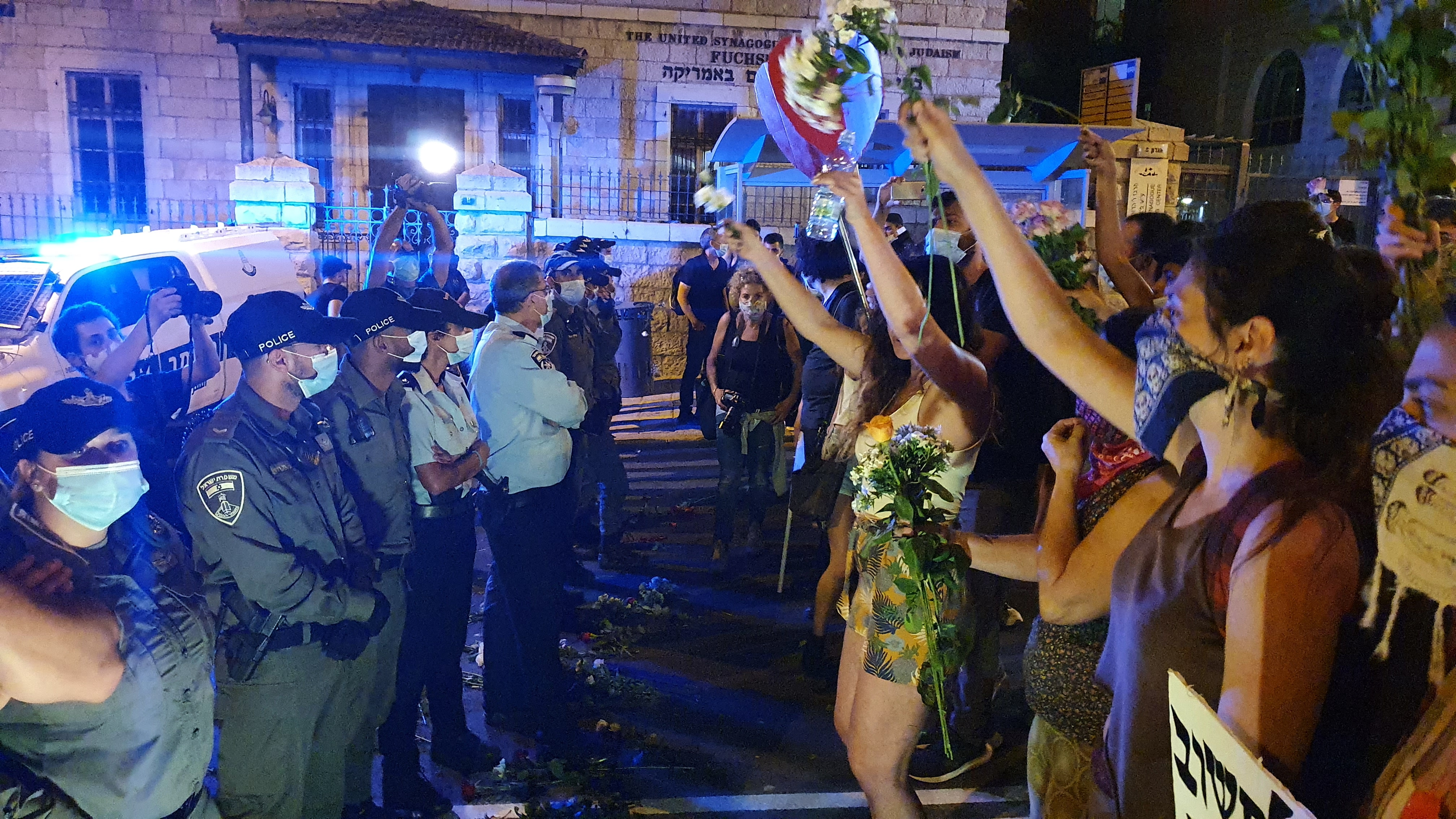
Policemen and demonstrators at Protest against Netanyahu, 23 July 2020

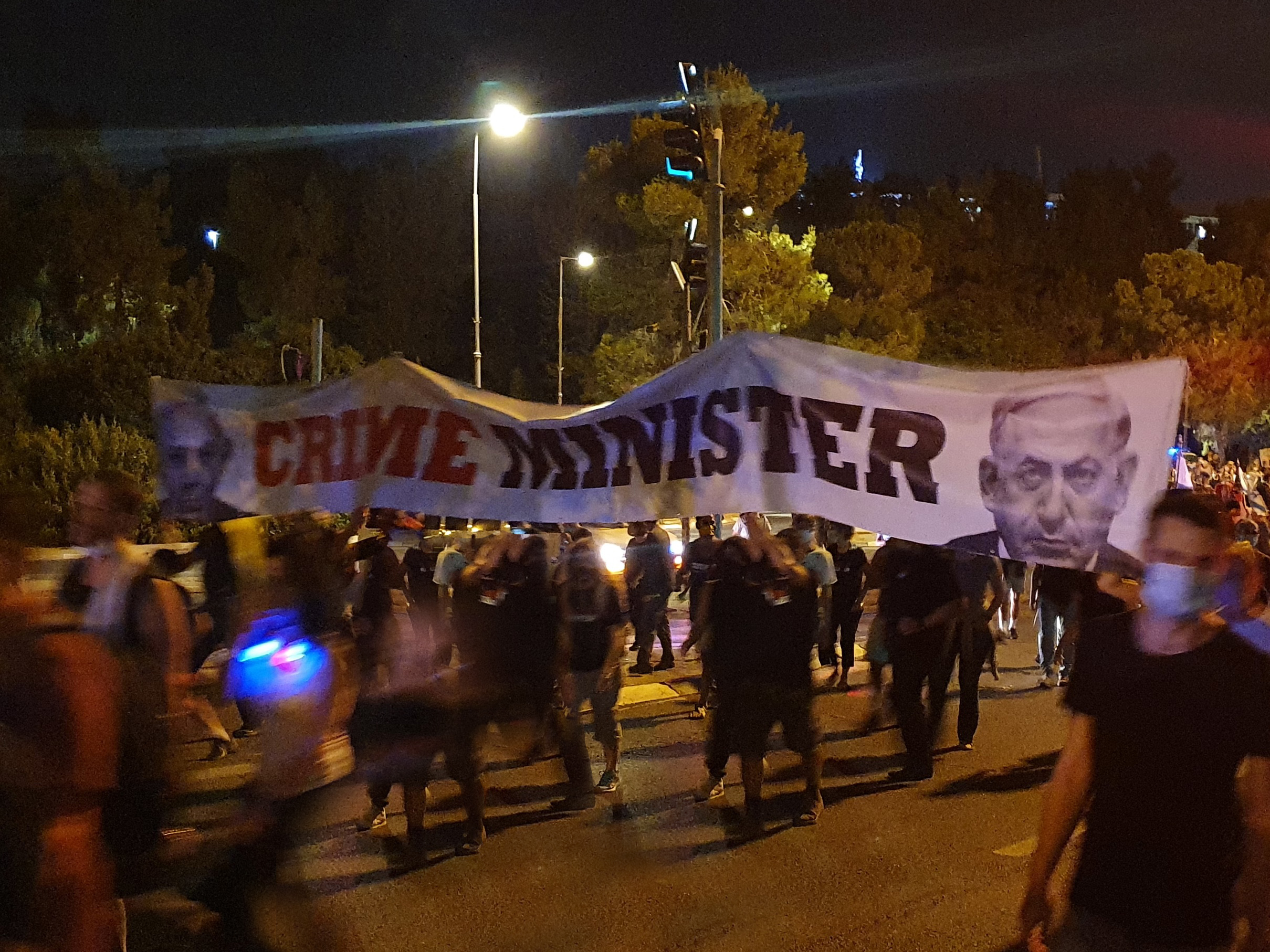
Protest against Netanyahu, 1 August 2020

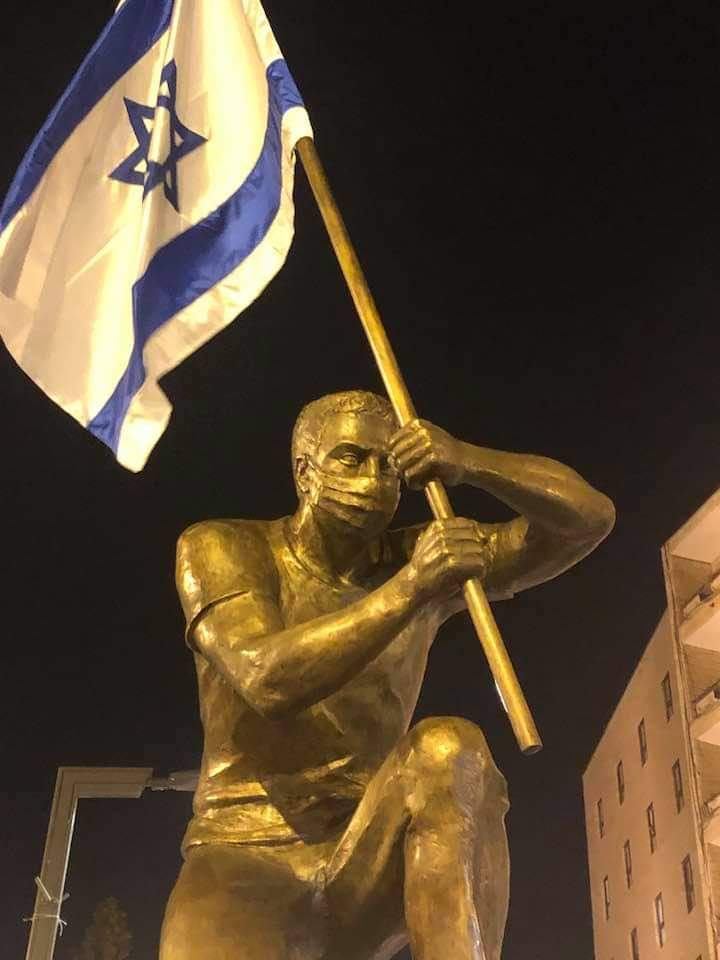
"Hero of Israel" statue by Israeli artist Itay Zalait, at Paris Square in Jerusalem

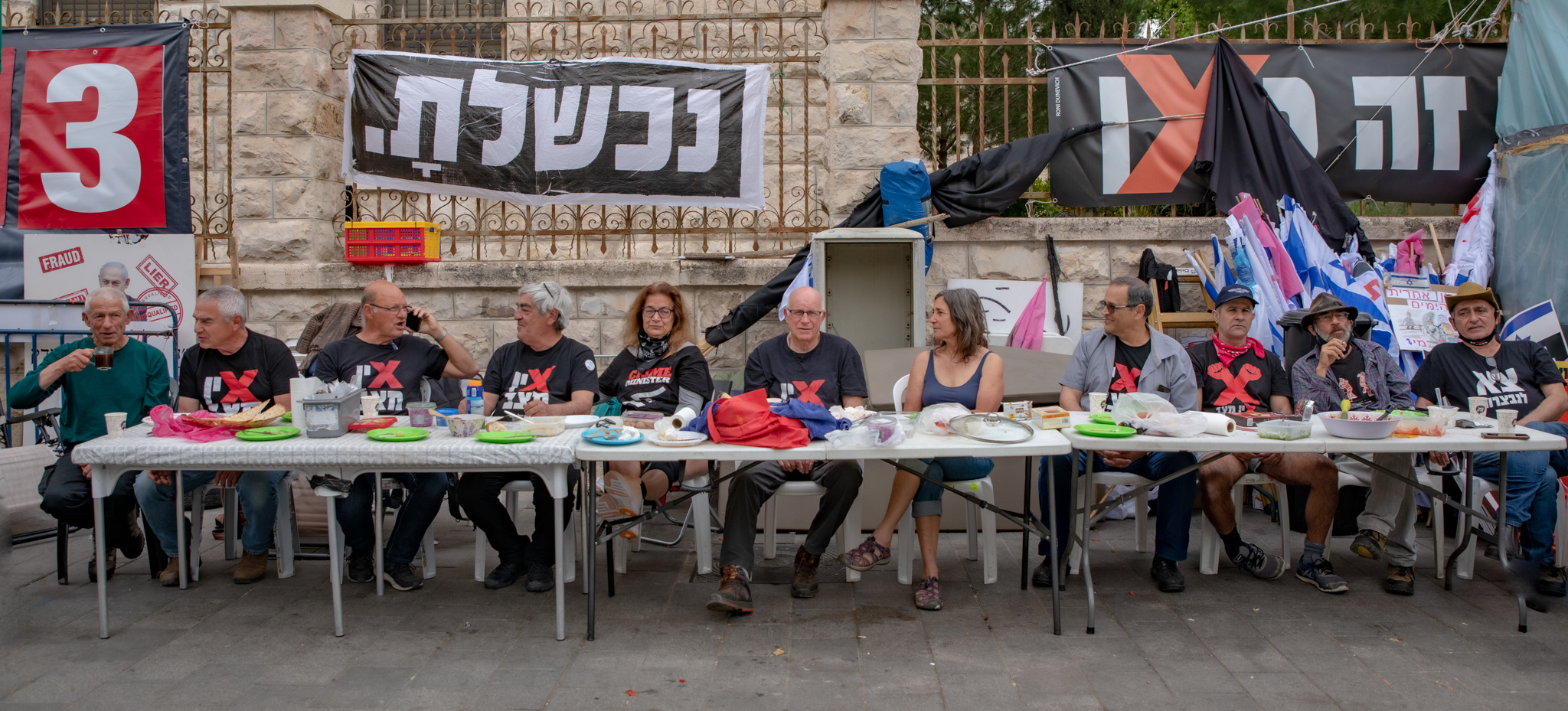
Closing of Balfour encampment of no condition, breakfast before the demolition of the encampment on 22 March 2021. Haskel is third from the left

The protests are taking place without any centralized leadership. Key activists include Amir Haskel from the "individual protest", Ishay Hadas from the "Crime Minister" group, Uri Nachman who opened the "Siege on Balfour", lawyer Gonen Ben Itzhak who accompanies the protests legally, and the independent journalist Or-ly Barlev who covers the protest and posts it on social media. On 23 July, the Ministry of Public Security Amir Ohana approached Barlev with an invitation to a meeting with protest representatives. She rejected the invitation on the grounds that it was a popular protest with no representatives to speak on behalf of the people.

=== "Siege of Balfour" ===
In December 2019, Uri Nachman, a member of Likud Central Committee, began the "siege of Balfour" near Beit Aghion, the Prime Minister's Residence in Jerusalem Hundreds demonstrate against Netanyahu near his official residence, again] She believed that this was the address for the protest, and this is the only way to make a change in Israel. But she remained alone, and her protest did not gain momentum. On 6 June, Nachman returned to Balfour for a 24-hour siege and slept there alone. On 10 June, Amir Haskel joined her and posted on social media about the opening of the sit-down strike in Balfour.

He wrote, "Have you seen the demonstrations in the White House in Washington? Now we want Washington to see the demonstrations in front of the prime minister's residence." There were 10–50 people in the protest compound. Some slept in Sleeping bags on the sidewalk, and some at neighbors in the area, who open their homes to protesters. Passers-by entered the compound to express support for the protesters. The main event is a Kabbalat Shabbat, which attracts a large crowd, and activities such as lectures, concerts, performances, meditation, and public singing took place.

=== Arrest of Amir Haskel ===
On 26 June, police dispersed the weekly "Kabbalat Shabbat" demonstration and arrested Amir Haskel, an Ex-general who was speaking there. The reason for the arrest was that he blocked the road for about two hours. The demonstrators claimed that this was an excuse since they were standing on the sidewalk. Along with Haskel, seven activists were arrested. They were offered to be released in exchange for an undertaking not to come to Balfour, but they refused. The arrest of Amir Haskel provoked outrage on social media, and for the first time, the institutionalized media reported on the "individual protest".

The arrest was perceived as a political arrest. Out of all the protest organizations came a call not to leave Haskel alone. The day after the arrest, hundreds marched to the "Russian Compound" and to the Magistrate's Court, where the detainees were. Then public figures also arrived for the first time, including Moshe Ya'alon, and Knesset members from all opposition parties. On Sunday morning, a judge released them unconditionally. Following the incident, all the protest groups scattered in the country moved to Balfour.

=== Bibistille ===
According to the protesters, the government's failed management of the COVID-19 crisis increased public unrest. Unlike previous demonstrations, on 14 July many young people came to the demonstrations. They gathered in front of the Prime Minister's Residence and nearby France Square ("Paris Square"). The demonstration was called "Bibistille", because of its historic date, French Bastille Day. The demonstration marked a change of trend, from a quiet protest with almost no mention in the institutionalized media, it became a noisy mass demonstration, with individualistic protest styles, costumes, and performances. It was the largest demonstration since the beginning of the "Balfour Siege", and thousands of people took part, with an estimated 4,000 people.

The police conducted a demonstration with a large number of special police forces, border guards and undercover police officers. According to statements of the demonstrators, violent provocateurs were implanted to sabotage the protest. The police arrested random protesters, struck people with water cannon, and used cavalry against the protesters. 50 demonstrators were arrested.

=== Demonstrations in Balfour ===
The demonstrations were held on Tuesdays, Thursdays, and Saturdays. On Fridays, there was a "Kabbalat Shabbat". Demonstrations also took place in Caesarea, near the private house of Benjamin Netanyahu, as well as near the house of the Minister of Internal Security, Amir Ohana in Tel Aviv. Police dispersed the demonstration with great force and extensive use of water cannons. A picture of a demonstrator kneeling with his hand waving the Israeli flag and trying to defend himself against the jet of water was widely covered in the media.

On 1 August, a demonstration was held in Balfour which was attended by over 10,000 people, the largest demonstration to date in the Balfour complex.

In September 2020 during the holidays, Netanyahu led a second closure on the entire country and tried to ban demonstrations in primary legislation. In response, local demonstrations took place across the country. In addition, a convoy of thousands of cars drove on the empty roads due to the closure, on their way to Jerusalem. The column of cars lengthened to a length of 20 km (12 mi). About 20,000 people came to protest in Paris Square. A week later, the Knesset authorized the government to restrict demonstrations.

=== Submarine scandal protests ===
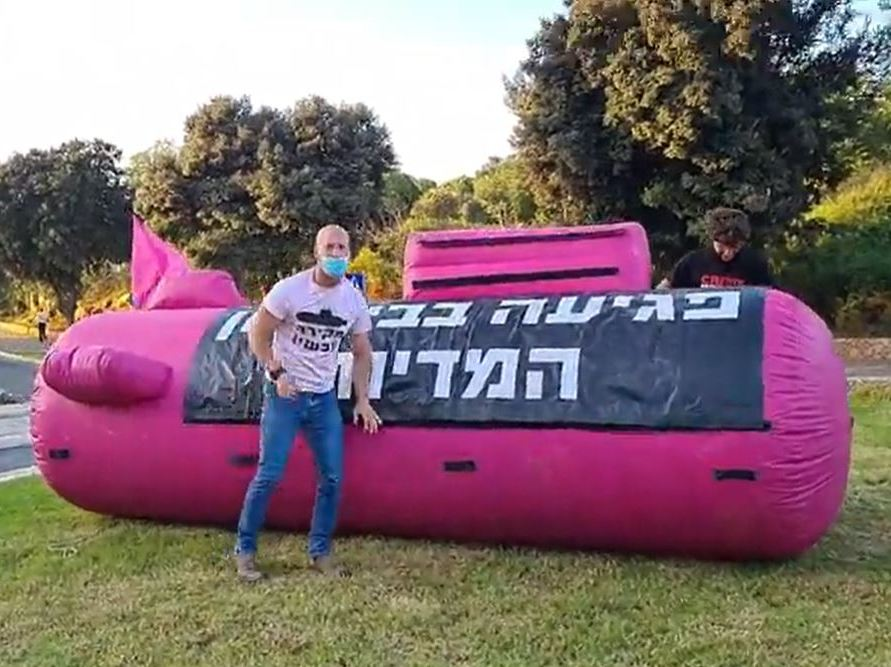
Roey Peleg with a pink submarine exhibit at The Knesset, 21 October 2020

The protest movement "Hakira Achshav" (Investigation Now), founded by Roey Peleg and Atar Sheinfeld, demands the establishment of State Investigation Committee in the "Submarine Scandal", which is regarded by many as "The Worst National Security Corruption Scandal in History". Within this capacity, the group initiated and led many protest activities including an underwater submarine protest and motor convoy protests along with large balloons in the shape of submarines.

== Conduct of the police ==
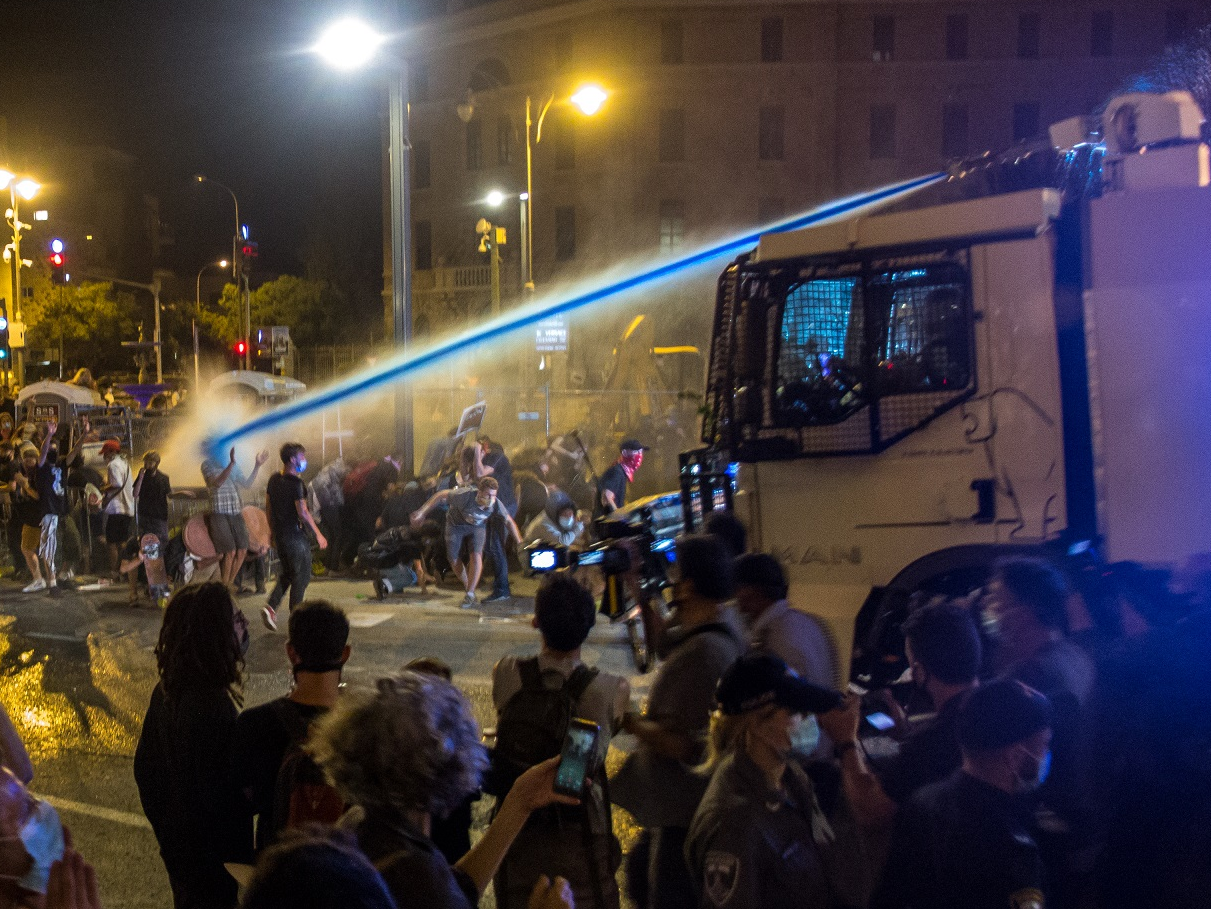
A water cannon in a demonstration fires a jet of water with a blue color from a short distance directly at people

The demonstrators strongly criticized the conduct of the police. They claim that since no commissioner was appointed since 2018, the police have become a political tool in the hands of the Minister of Internal Security and a great supporter of Netanyahu, Amir Ohana. This criticism is backed up by former Israeli police officials, including former Commissioner Moshe Karadi and ex-Major General Alik Ron. It was directed especially against the Jerusalem District Commander, Doron Yadid, whom the demonstrators used to sing "You will not be a Commissioner". In a conversation with Yadid, Ohana asked for a total ban on demonstrations near the prime minister's residence. In contrast to the High Court ruling, he asked to "subvert the High Court". In response to the incident, Attorney General Avichai Mandelblit sent a letter to the Deputy Commissioner of Police, Moti Cohen, warning that the police must make decisions independently and with no foreign considerations.

There was unusual conduct on the part of the police against the protesters. The artist Zeev Engelmayer, who appears in the form of the comic "Shoshke", was arrested during a demonstration in Jerusalem on suspicion of "sexual harassment of the public", an offense that does not exist in the Penal Code. Police officers were sent to a man's house to order him to remove a picture of Netanyahu from Facebook. Demonstrator Iris Boker was questioned on suspicion of sexually harassing Sarah Netanyahu due to a tweet that did not deal with her at all. Police and inspectors from the Jerusalem Municipality twice raided the demonstrators' compound in Balfour and confiscated a large amount of equipment without a court order.

On 15 July 2020, about 50 protesters were arrested. The police used water cannons from close range, contrary to the procedure which prohibits shooting on the heads of protesters.

On 5 October, as a group of protesters demonstrated on a pedestrian bridge over a highway near Kfar Vitkin, a pro-Netanyahu slogan was blared from the loudspeaker of a police car as it passed underneath. The police subsequently announced that two volunteer officers had been suspended over the incident.

== See also ==
- 2023 Israeli judicial reform protests
