= The Green Prince =

The Green Prince may refer to:

- The Green Prince, a 2000 novel by Sophie Masson
- Green Prince, an alias of Mosab Hassan Yousef, a Palestinian who spied for Israel; also the title of a 2014 documentary film about him
- The Green Prince (film), a 2014 German documentary film directed by Nadav Schirman
