= Ishay Hadas =

Israeli producer, voice over artist and political activist

- ישי הדס
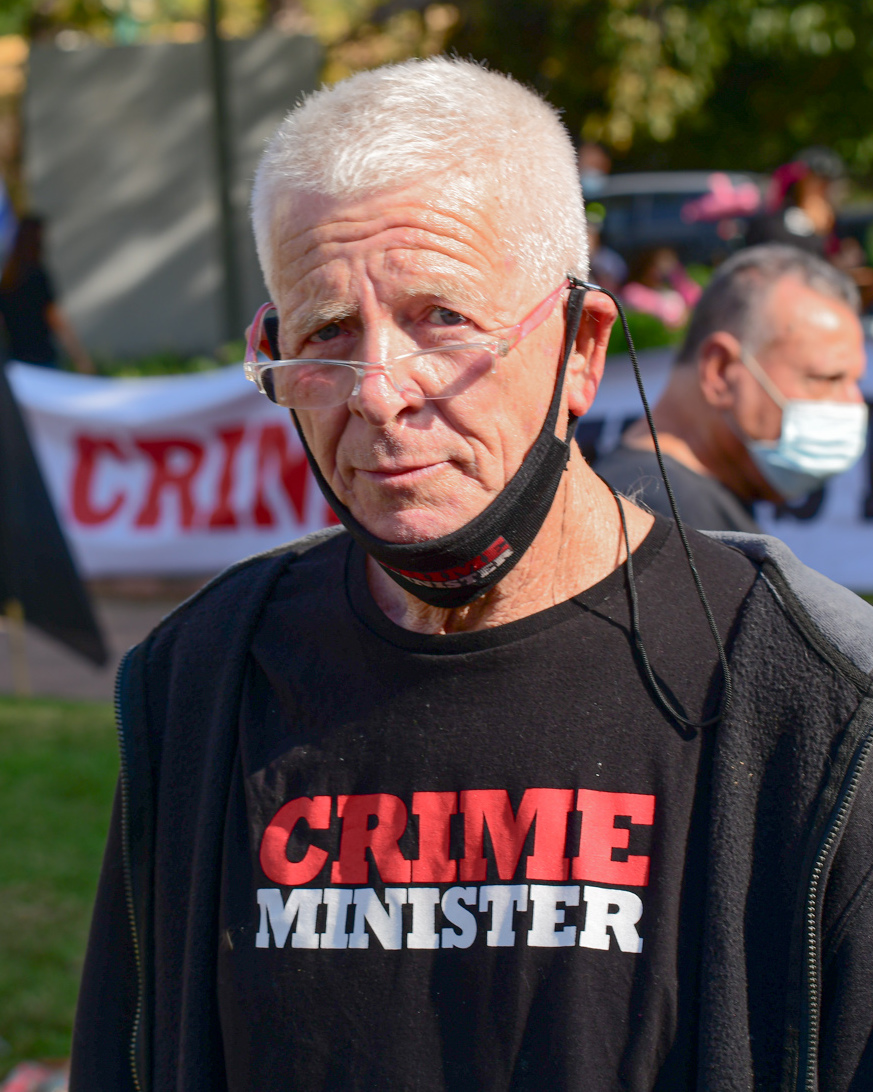
- Hadas in 2020
- Born: October 19, 1955 (age 70)
- Education: Tel Aviv University
- Occupation: television producer
- Known for: television production; social activism; political activism; entrepreneurship

Ishay Hadas (Hebrew: ישי הדס; born: October 19, 1955) is an Israeli television producer, voice-over actor, social and political activist, and a founding member of the "Hoze Hadash" (New Deal) movement, better known as "Crime Minister". Hadas is an outspoken and one of the prominent figures in the protests against Benjamin Netanyahu.

== Biography ==
Hadas was born on October 19, 1955. Hadas is the founder of Ishai Hadas Productions LTD.

In 2013, Hadas appeared in the Israeli mockumentary "Reshimot Katzman" (The Katzman Tapes) as himself. In 2015, Hadas rendered voice-overs in a series of television commercials for "Meshek Zuriel", a leading dairy manufacturer in Israel.

== Social activism ==
In 2004, while on a trip to Ethiopia, Hadas encountered a young woman named Sophie who was offered to him for purchase by her employer, Hadas saw this is an opportunity to change Sophie's life around and pull her out of a future life of misery and hardship. Hadas offered Sophie to come with him on the pretense that he would fund her education and she would stick with it till the end. Sophie agreed and went back to Addis Ababa with Hadas where she began her studies as a pharmacist. Hadas continued to fund her studies until her graduation in 2013 when Hadas returned to Ethiopia to be reacquainted with Sophie, now a wife and a mother, for her graduation ceremony, as part of Uvda, an Israeli television news magazine program.

In March 2022, following the Russian invasion of Ukraine, Hadas along with others in his organization flew to neighboring Romania to aid with the relief efforts of Ukrainian refugees fleeing the country.

== Political activism ==
In 2018, Hadas along with Gonen Ben Itzhak and others formed the Hoze Hadash (New Deal) foundation, better known as "Crime Minister". The organization has been standing at the forefront of the protests against Benjamin Netanyahu. Hadas frequently takes it upon himself to post live broadcasts from the ongoing protests to followers of the "Crime Minister" page on Facebook.

In 2018, Hadas was arrested by police for bearing a protest sign with the words "Crime Minister" on it along the route of the Giro D'Italia bicycle tournament. When asked once what he hopes to accomplish with these protests, Hadas replied "For Shaked to return home". Shaked is Hadas' granddaughter who lives abroad.

In May 2020, following the 2020 Israeli legislative election, Hadas, along with "Hoze Hadash", filed a complaint against tasking Benjamin Netanyahu with the formation of the unity government on the grounds that it "warps" the will of the voter. In an August 2020 interview for 103FM, Hadas was taken off the air for claiming Ben Caspit's radio show was "subpar". Hadas had told him that he voted for Benny Gantz who "stabbed him in the back" by forming a unity government with Netanyahu and was later asked by Caspit why he's not protesting against Gantz to which Hadas replied with "subpar".

On March 18, 2023, Hadas was detained by police at a demonstration, part of the 2023 Israeli anti-judicial reform protests, held at Kfar Uria where the Minister of National Security, Itamar Ben-Gvir (who was convicted of supporting a terrorist), was weekending. Hadas was later released after refusing to sign an agreement which forbade him from participating in further protests.
