= Son of Hamas =

2010 autobiography

- Author: Mosab Hassan Yousef
- Language: English
- Subject: Mosab Hassan Yousef, Hamas, Shin Bet
- Genre: Autobiography, Memoir
- Publisher: Tyndale House Publishers
- Publication date: 2 March 2010
- Publication place: United States
- Media type: Print (hardback & paperback)
- Pages: 288
- ISBN: 978-1414333076
- OCLC: 436617370
- Dewey Decimal: 956.9405/4092 B 22
- LC Class: DS119.7 .Y68 2010
- Followed by: From Hamas to America

Son of Hamas: A Gripping Account of Terror, Betrayal, Political Intrigue, and Unthinkable Choices is an autobiography written by Mosab Hassan Yousef and Ron Brackin. It covers Yousef's journey from the son of Hamas founder Sheikh Hassan Yousef to Shin Bet informant. It was adapted for film as The Green Prince.

== Overview ==
The book covers Yousef's journey from a child who was taught about the evils of the Jews. He was eventually captured by the Israel Defense Forces after buying guns for revenge. He chose to work with Shin Bet in order to get out of prison. Yousef wanted to act as a double agent for Hamas. He eventually chose to help Israel, and was codenamed "The Green Prince", and helped prevent terrorism. He eventually saved hundreds of lives by preventing suicide bombings. After years of working with Israel, he requested to be released. He later converted to Christianity. The book ends with Yousef moving to the United States, where he has continued to share his criticism of Hamas and the Pro-Palestine movement. He wrote a second book: From Hamas to America which details his life in America after the first book.

== Reception ==
Son of Hamas was on The New York Times Best Seller list for two weeks in March 2010.

== Film adaptation ==
The book was adapted into movie form as The Green Prince. The movie received four awards: Best Documentary Award by the Israeli Film Academy (2014), Audience Award during the Moscow International Film Festival (2014), Best Documentary Award at the Sundance Film Festival (2014), and Best Documentary at the Bavarian Film Awards (2015).
