= Gonen Ben Itzhak =

Israeli lawyer and social activist

- גונן בן יצחק
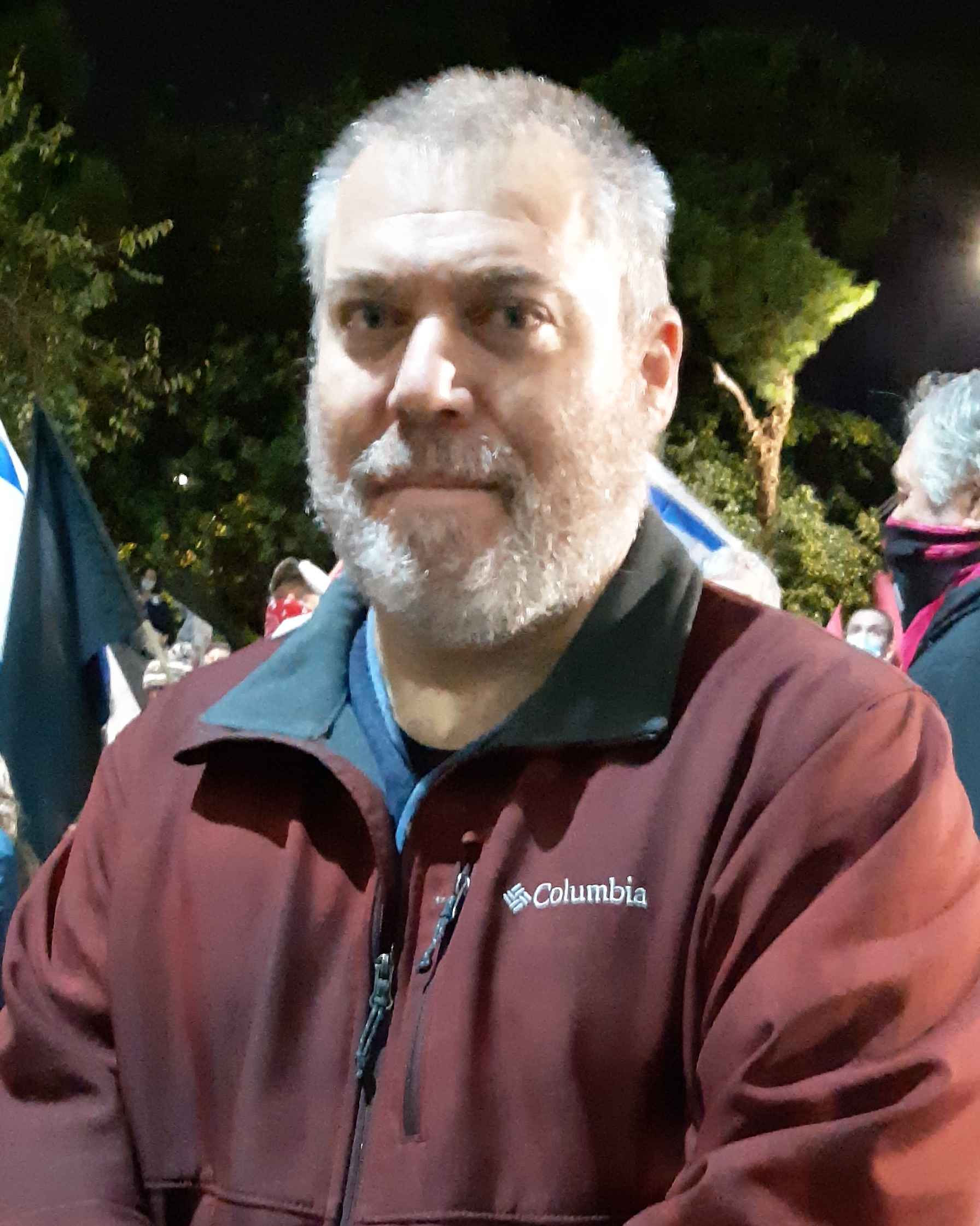
- Gonen Ben Itzhak at a protest in Haifa, 26 November 2020
- Born: 3 March 1971 (age 55)
- Education: University of Beer Sheva; IDC Herzliya; Tel Aviv University
- Occupation: lawyer
- Years active: 1996–present
- Known for: Work in the Shin Bet; social activism; entrepreneurship; protests against Benjamin Netanyahu

Gonen Ben Itzhak (Hebrew: גונן בן יצחק; born: 3 March 1971) is an Israeli lawyer, former Shin Bet coordinator, and social activist. He is one of the former handlers of undercover informant Mosab Hassan Yousef ("The Green Prince"). He is one of the leading figures in the protests against Benjamin Netanyahu, and is among the founders of the anti-Netanyahu protest movement "Crime Minister".

== Biography ==
Gonen Ben Itzhak grew up in Ness Ziona. His father is Brigadier General Uzi Ben Itzhak and his mother, Ronit, is a music teacher. In 1985, the family moved to the United States due to his father's military service. Ben Itzhak served in the Israeli Navy. Following his discharge, he studied psychology at the University of Beer Sheva and completed a bachelor's degree. He was a troop coordinator and was the Southern District coordinator of the Israeli Scouts movement. In 2005, he began studying law and business administration at IDC Herzliya. He completed his master's degree with distinction at Tel-Aviv University.

== Shin Bet position ==
In 1996, Ben Itzhak was recruited to the Shin Bet as an intelligence officer in the Arab sector – in the area of Ramallah. In this capacity, he was entrusted with the task of recruiting and handling agents and preventing terrorist attacks in the area. In 2002, he was appointed deputy coordinator of the district of Ramallah. He commanded the area during Operation Defensive Shield, among other operations. In this capacity, he handled agents within the ranks of terrorist organization members. Ben Itzhak was involved with the 2002 arrest of Marwan Barghouti.

=== "The Green Prince" ===
Ben Itzhak was among the handlers of Mosab Hassan Yousef ("The Green Prince"), son of Sheik Hassan Yousef, one of the leaders of Hamas. Yousef ranked among the top Shin Bet agents within Hamas and worked for the Shin Bet for nearly ten years. Together with Yousef, Ben Itzhak worked to prevent Hamas terrorist operations in the area of Ramallah. Ben Itzhak stood behind the arrest of Shadi Saadiya, the terrorist behind the Ein 'Arik checkpoint attack in which six Israeli soldiers were killed.

Ben Itzhak was interviewed in the 2014 documentary film The Green Prince. He also served as professional advisor for the 2013 Israeli film Bethlehem and throughout the first season of the acclaimed Israeli television series, Fauda.

== Social and political activism ==
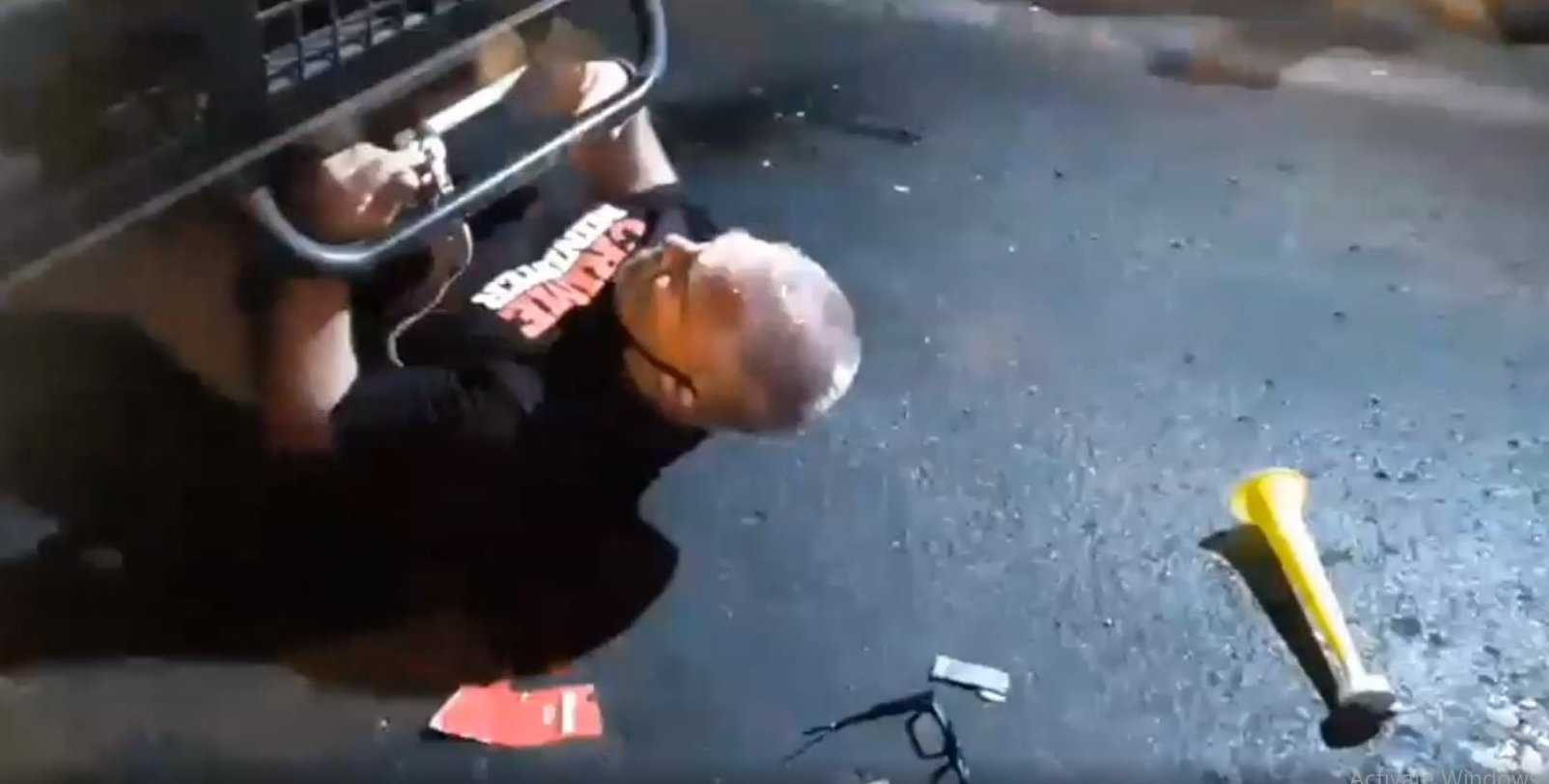
Gonen Ben Itzhak lying down under a water cannon in order to prevent its use, 18 July 2020.

Ben Itzhak is part of the struggle against "The Gas Plan", the decision made by the Israeli government, in August 2015, to regulate the natural gas industry in the country. He was arrested during a protest near Prime Minister Benjamin Netanyahu's office. On 6 October 2008, he was arrested in Beit She'an for obstructing the prime minister's convoy. He took part in protests against the attorney general, Avichai Mandelblit.

Ben Itzhak is a member of "Israel Yekara Lanu" (a pun that can mean both Israel is Dear to Us and Israel is Expensive for Us), which fights against the cost of living in Israel.

In 2019, Ben Itzhak joined the "Eretz Hadasha" (New Country) party which ran in the general elections. In January 2021 he announced he was joining the Telem political party led by Moshe Ya'alon.

In 2020, Ben Itzhak was listed in TheMarker's list of the 100 most influential people in Israel.

=== Crime Minister ===
Ben Itzhak is among the founding members of the "Hoze Hadash" (New Contract) movement, better known as "Crime Minister". He is involved in many protests across the country and near the prime minister's residence in Jerusalem. Along with other lawyers, he represents people who have been arrested during the protests against Benjamin Netanyahu. Ben Itzhak serves as legal advisor for various protest movements, which include the "Black Flag" protests. On 18 July 2020, Ben Itzhak was arrested after lying down under a water cannon in order to prevent its use. On 24 November 2020, Ben Itzhak was indicted on grounds of "disturbing public order and preventing the police from carrying out their duties". Head of Shin Bet, Ronen Bar, alleged that Netanyahu asked him to use the resources and authority of the Shin Bet against Ben Itzhak

== Personal life ==
Ben Itzhak is married and the father of four.
