= The Green Prince (film) =

- Directed by: Nadav Schirman
- Written by: Nadav Schirman
- Starring: Mosab Hassan Yousef
- Music by: Max Richter
- Release date: 16 January 2014 (USA)
- Running time: 101 minutes
- Countries: Germany, Israel, USA, UK
- Languages: English, Arabic, Hebrew

The Green Prince (Hebrew: הנסיך הירוק) is a 2014 documentary film directed by Nadav Schirman. It is based on the autobiography of Mosab Hassan Yousef, Son of Hamas: A Gripping Account of Terror, Betrayal, Political Intrigue, and Unthinkable Choices.

The movie received four awards: Best Documentary Award by the Israeli Film Academy (2014), Audience Award during the Moscow International Film Festival (2014), Best Documentary Award at the Sundance Film Festival (2014) and Best Documentary at the Bavarian Film Awards (2015).

== Synopsis ==
The film tells the story of Mosab, son of Hamas leader Sheikh Hassan Yousef, who for ten years was a spy for Israel's Shin Bet. The documentary features largely interviews with Mosab Hassan Yousef and also with his operator Gonen Ben Yitzhak, with original footage from the events covered, mainly from the Second Intifada, interspersed during and between those interviews. It covers Israel's counter-terrorism efforts during that period.

== Cast ==
- Mosab Hassan Yousef as himself
- Gonen Ben Itzhak as himself
- Sheikh Hassan Yousef as himself
