= Or-ly Barlev =

Israeli social activist and journalist

- אור-לי ברלב
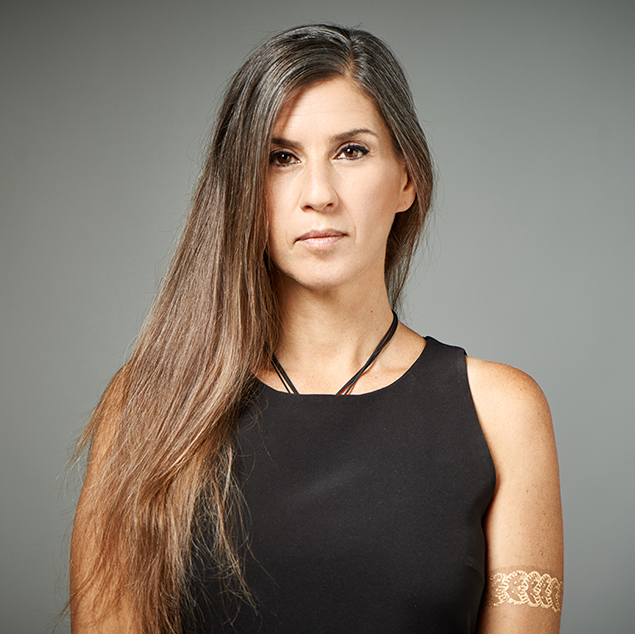
- Or-ly Barlev
- Born: June 2, 1972 (age 53); Ashdod, Israel
- Occupation: Journalist
- Years active: 1997–present
- Known for: journalism; social activism

Or-ly Barlev (Hebrew: אור-לי ברלב; born: June 2, 1972) is an Israeli social activist, and independent journalist. She is the first independent journalist, not backed by a media organization, who was accepted to the Israeli Journalism and Media Council. Her operation is funded by public donations.

== Biography ==
Or-ly Barlev was born and grew up in Ashdod, the eldest child of three. Her mother was a dental assistant and her father was an electronic technician. After her service in the Israeli Defense Forces, she studied for her bachelor's degree in communication and management at Israel's College of Management. In conjunction with her studies, she broadcast traffic reports on Reshet Gimmel radio.

From 1997 to 2000 Barlev was a journalist on Reshet Bet radio of Kol Israel. During the 1999 Israeli general election, Barlev covered the Center Party. Later, Barlev would go on to cover the "Histadrut" and work relations. After leaving Kol Israel, Barlev served for one year as news editor for the "Haaretz" newspaper. In conjunction, she studied and was certified as a mediator.

In 2011, following the Israeli social justice protests, Barlev and other protest supporters established "Social Justice – Situation Room", a Facebook page which defines itself as "a communication channel for broadcasting the ideas brought up during the social justice protests".

In 2013, Barlev along with other organizations began protesting the export of natural gas and the recommendations of "The Zemach Commission". In 2015, with the incline of protest against the government's "Gas Outline", Barlev would become its most outspoken figure and would frequently make appearances at the Knesset's economic committee on behalf of "The Protest Against the Gas", while the committee was convening.

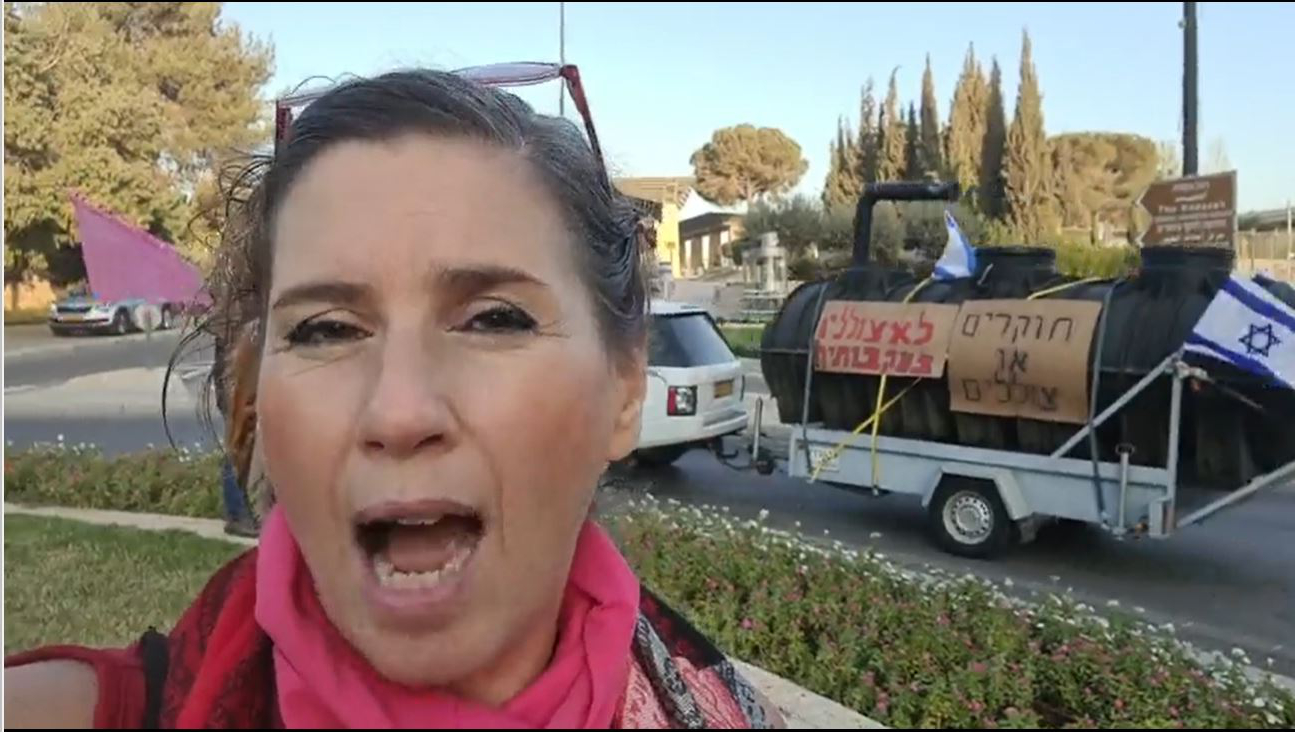
Or-ly Barlev on October 21, 2020, broadcasting from the Knesset

In 2016, Barlev became a regular commentator on Israeli Channel 10's "Layla Kalkali" (Economy Night) news show which ran until 2017.

Barlev is a member of the "Independent Investigative Reporting Fund", which finances investigative journalists at the direct behest and direction of the public and whose financial sources are from crowd funding. As an independent journalist, she writes for websites such as "Hamakom Hachi Ham B'Gehenom" (The Hottest Place in Hell), "Ha Ayin Ha Shvi'it" (The Seventh Eye), and the blog "Kalkala Amitit" (Real Economy).

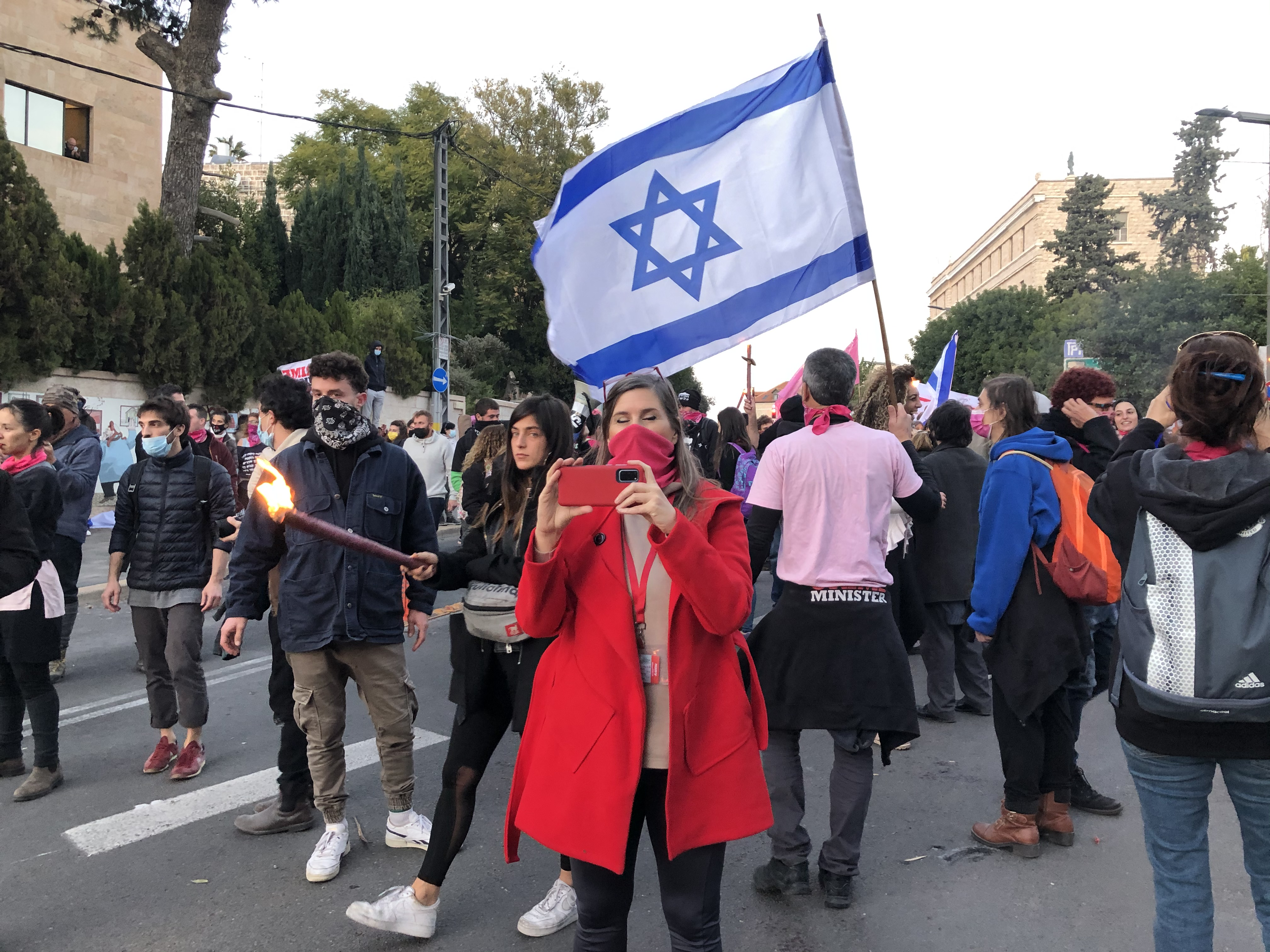
Or-ly Barlev at a protest march, December 2020

In March 2018, Barlev was included in Lady Globes Magazine's "Israel's Top 20 Female Activists for 2018" list.

From November 2018, Barlev has taken part in the investigative news show "HaReshet HaHevratit" (The Social Network) on Israel's Channel 13.

In 2020, Barlev took part in the protests against Benjamin Netanyahu and would continuously put up live broadcasts on social media. She was attacked by a policeman – while on the air – who claimed she wasn't a journalist. During the broadcast she is heard saying that he groped her breasts. On August 26, 2020, a few days after the incident, Barlev received a journalist card from the Israeli Journalist Organization which would help her identify herself to police officials at protest rallies.

In 2020, Barlev was listed in The Marker's list of 100 most influential people in Israel.

In 2023, Barlev stood at the forefront of the anti-judicial reform protests continuously putting up live broadcasts on social media and serving as a prominent speaker at events and rallies across the country.

== Personal life ==
Barlev is a divorced mother of two.
