= Terra Sancta College (Jerusalem) =

Catholic institution, former school

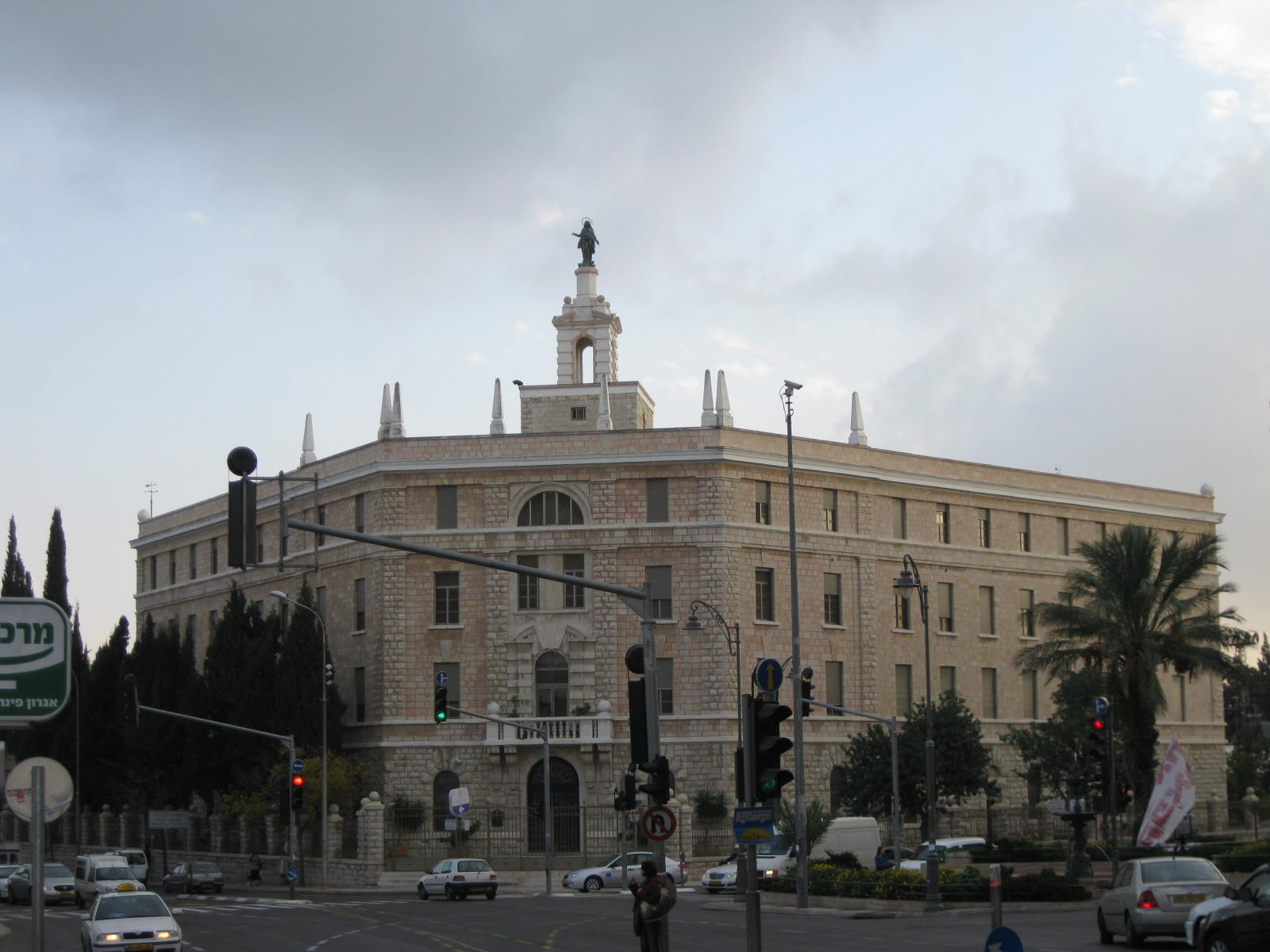

General information
- Architectural style: Neo-Classical frame with Renaissance Revival details
- Location: Keren HaYesod St 2, Jerusalem 91008 (Paris Square), Jerusalem (West), Israel
- Coordinates: 31°46′29.05″N 35°13′04.28″E
- Current tenants: the Custody's cultural and communications centre, preceded by: "Opera Cardinal Ferrari" school (1928-1930); Terra Santa/Sancta College, Franciscan school (1930-1947); Hebrew University of Jerusalem (1949-late 1990s)
- Construction started: 1926
- Inaugurated: 1927
- Owner: Company of Saint Paul of Milan (1926-29); Custody of the Holy Land (Franciscans; since 1929)

Design and construction
- Architect: Antonio Barluzzi

Website
- Franciscan page with contact details of the various institutions

Terra Sancta College of Jerusalem serves as the cultural centre of the Franciscan Custody of the Holy Land and as a succursal institution (dependency) of Saint Saviour's Latin parish. It was initially created in the 1920s as a school for the children of Jerusalem, regardless of their religious affiliation. It stands at the southwestern extremity of the Talbiyeh neighbourhood of West Jerusalem, on the souteast side of Paris Square.

== History ==
=== "Opera Cardinal Ferrari" boys' school (1928-1930) ===
The building was erected in 1926 to be used as a school and was designed by the architect Antonio Barluzzi, who crowned it with a replica of the statue of the Virgin Mary which stands on top of the Milan Cathedral, the Madonnina. It was inaugurated in 1927.

The building's purpose was to house a boys' school named in Italian "Opera Cardinal Ferrari" in honour of a recently deceased Archbishop of Milan who had shown much engagement for social justice. The project was run by a charitable Catholic lay institution initiated by Cardinal Ferrari, the Congregation of Saint Paul (CSP) of Milan, established in 1920 as the Company of Saint Paul, since 1924 a Congregation dependent directly on the Holy See, also known in English as the Society of Saint Paul, which may be misleading, as it is fully distinct from the slightly older Society of Saint Paul (SSP); it is also distinct from the Società San Paolo of Alba, in spite of sporadically occurring confusion.

In 1928, at the inauguration ceremony, when the Madonnina replica was also unveiled, one of the attendeees was the Italian heir apparent, Prince Umberto of Piedmont, future King Umberto II.

The school operated for two years: in 1928-29 it had 270 enrolled pupils, only one hundred of which were Catholic; and 1929–30, with just 130 pupils. The children were taught in eight separate classes, covering primary school and high school. Its activity ended due to lack of funds, and the property was then entrusted to the safe hands of the Custody of the Holy Land.

=== Terra Sancta/Santa College (1930-1947) ===
Under the Franciscans the Terra Santa College flourished, with a constantly growing number of pupils throughout the 1930s. It remained open to children of all religions, registering 360 pupils in 1936–37, of which 85 were Latin Christians, 171 Greek Orthodox Christians, Armenians, Syriacs, Copts and Protestants, 53 Muslims and 31 Jews. The total number of pupils rose until the closure of the school in 1947, numbering 475 in 1940–41.

=== 1947-1949 war ===
In 1947, the British authorities declared the area around the school a security zone, access was forbidden, and the school was forced to close. As a result of the 1948 Arab–Israeli War, Jerusalem became divided and the Arab pupils living in the eastern part of the city were cut off from their school, which is located in west Jerusalem. The Franciscans, under whom the Terra Sancta College had arguably become the most prestigious school in the Middle East, didn't allow their centre of education to shut down for long, opening a new school in Amman already in 1948 and, in 1949, another Terra Sancta College in the Old City of Jerusalem.

=== Hebrew University (1949-1990s) ===
In 1949 the Hebrew University of Jerusalem (HUJI), whose previous campus on Mount Scopus, now in East Jerusalem, also had to be abandoned, took over part of the premises. Some of the scenes in the novel A Tale of Love and Darkness as well as My Michael by the Israeli writer Amos Oz play in those years inside the building. Several departments of the university moved in, and by the late 1980s several of them were still housed there, including the university publishing house, Magnes Press, the offices of the Friends of the Hebrew University, HUJI's own Research and Development Authority, and the headquarter of the World Union of Jewish Students, sharing the building with the British Council Library and the Dante Alighieri Society for Italian Culture.

The Hebrew University eventually moved its faculties to the new campus in Givat Ram, and the Terra Santa building remained nearly abandoned. The Custody of the Holy Land undertook steps in the mid-90s to annul the lease agreements, which were indeed dissolved by June 1999.

=== Franciscan cultural and communications centre ===
Once the Custody of the Holy Land regained control over their property, they undertook extensive renovation work of the building.

== Current use ==
As of 2020, several cultural departments of the Custody were working from the College premises: the communications department in charge of the official media in the Holy Land, which includes a multimedia centre broadcasting news programmes in different languages, and the editorial office of the Christian Media Center and of the French-language Terre Sainte Magazine.

The house is run by the Franciscan Sisters of the Immaculate, of whom some are living there. The premises are also used as living quarters by Franciscan friars, such as the director of the Custody's school of music, who is also in charge of relations with the Jewish world, as well as some religious and students of the Studium Biblicum Franciscanum academic society, along with volunteers who work with the Custody performing pastoral, cultural and social activities.

== Description ==
Antonio Barluzzi's design combines a Neoclassical style with elements of Italian Renaissance Revival and oriental ones.

The building comprises a ground floor and three upper storeys. It spans 11 dunams.

From the central courtyard one can reach the wing containing the chapel. The replica of the Madonnina decorates the roof.

== See also ==
- PhD thesis discussing the competition between the older French-language Dominican school and the Italian-dominated College, which gained pupils and British Mandate support by teaching in English, as well as upper-class attendance by tuition and admission policies.
