= Terra Sancta Chapel, Jerusalem =

Terra Sancta Chapel
- הקפלה טרה סנטה
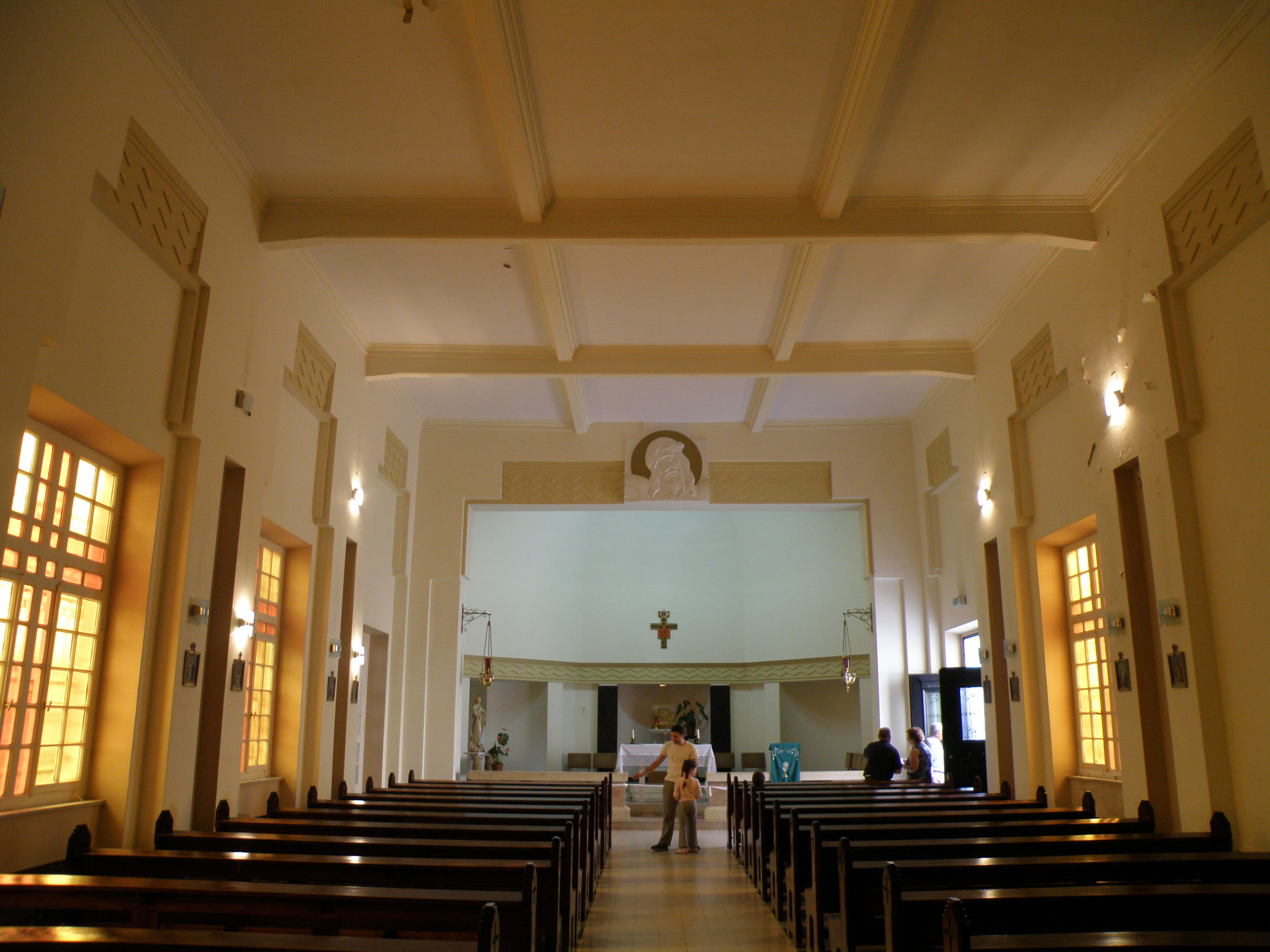
- Location: Jerusalem
- Denomination: Roman Catholic Church

Architecture
- Architect: Antonio Barluzzi

The Terra Sancta Chapel (Hebrew: הקפלה טרה סנטה) or Chapel of Terra Sancta is a chapel of the Catholic Church that is located inside the educational complex of the Terra Sancta College, located at Paris Square, in Jerusalem.

The original complex was built in 1926, with the design of the Italian architect Antonio Barluzzi in 1933 were added the chapel and residences that are in buildings annexed to the main structure.

The chapel, just like the complex, originally had the Italian name Terra Santa, but due to the situation during World War II, when Italy was an enemy state of the British Empire, who at that time ruled what was known as Mandatory Palestine, it was changed to the Latin version: Terra Sancta. Both names translate as Holy Land.

The church is used by Christian students, the Franciscan Sisters of the Immaculate and the Franciscan Fraternity.

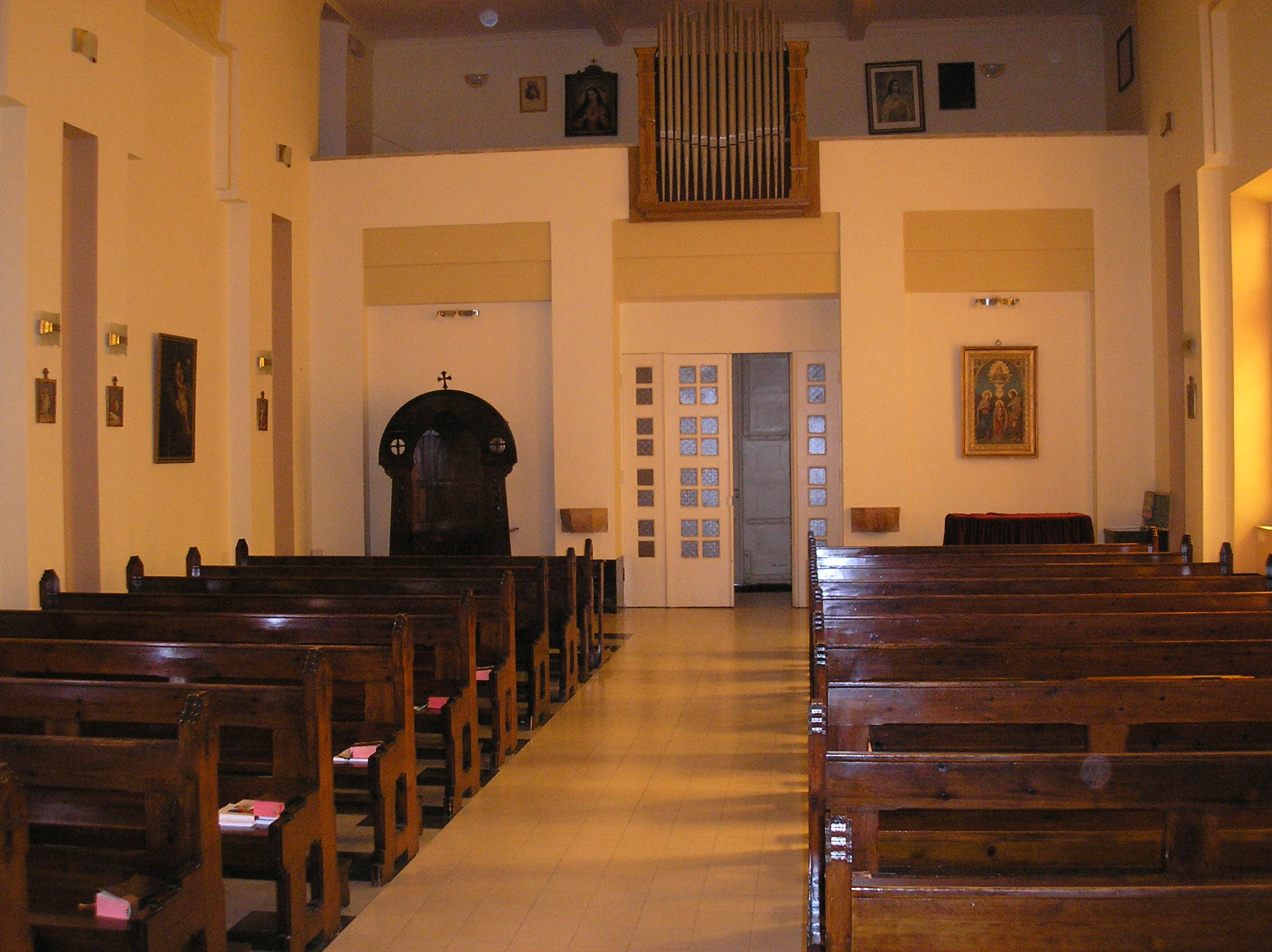
Another view

== See also ==
- Roman Catholicism in Israel
- St. Vincent de Paul Chapel, Jerusalem
