= Mosab Hassan Yousef =

Palestinian-born American author

- مصعب حسن يوسف
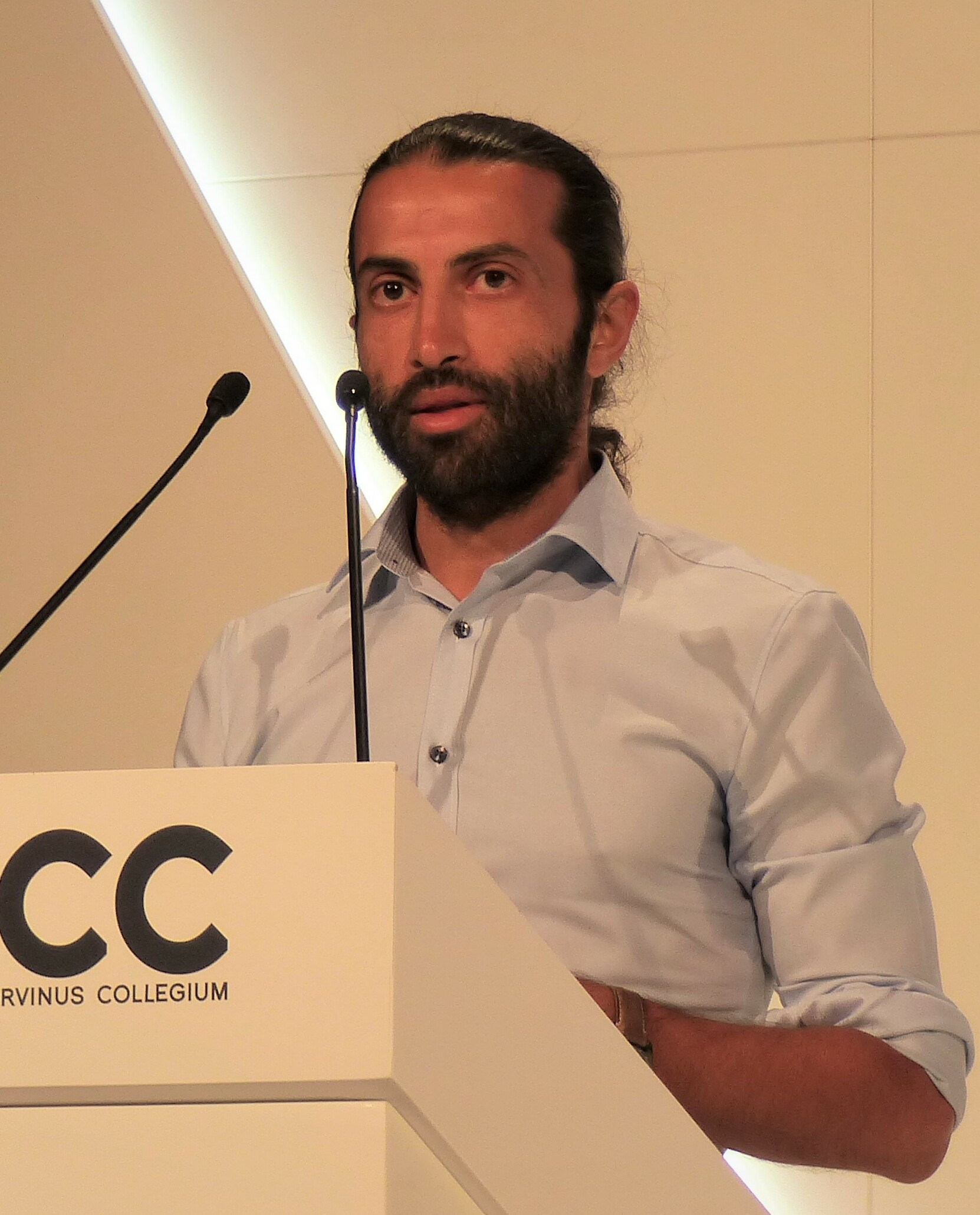
- Yousef at the 2019 Budapest Demographic Summit
- Born: Ramallah, West Bank
- Citizenship: United States
- Occupations: Spy, advocate, author
- Employer: Shin Bet (1997–2007)
- Organization: Hamas (1987–2007)
- Known for: Covert defection to Israel in 1997 and conversion to Christianity from Islam in 1999
- Notable work: Son of Hamas (2010), The Green Prince (2014)
- Father: Sheikh Hassan Yousef

Mosab Hassan Yousef (Note: Arabic: مصعب حسن يوسف) is an American author and former militant who defected to Israel in 1997, thereafter working as an Israeli spy for the Shin Bet until he moved to the United States in 2007. His father is Hassan Yousef, a co-founder of the Palestinian Islamist organization Hamas. A New York Times bestselling author, he is known for his outspoken criticisms of Hamas, the pro-Palestinian movement and Islam's treatment of non-Muslims.

The Shin Bet considered Yousef to be Israel's most valuable source within the Hamas leadership: the information he supplied allowed Israel to successfully thwart dozens of Palestinian suicide attacks against civilians and prevent the assassinations of many Israeli civilians and soldiers; exposed numerous Hamas cells; and assisted Israeli authorities in hunting down Palestinian militants. His efforts also culminated in the incarceration of his father, who had served as a leading figure for Hamas operations from the West Bank. In March 2010, Yousef published his autobiography, titled Son of Hamas.

In 1999, Yousef converted from Islam to Christianity, being formally baptized in 2004, but did not disclose this fact to the public until 2008 due to fears that his family members in Ramallah would become targets for religious persecution by Islamist groups. In 2007, he left the West Bank and moved to the United States where he applied for political asylum and had his request granted by American authorities in 2010 following Shin Bet handler Gonen Ben Itzhak testifying on his behalf. Yousef has compared Islam to Nazism, has said he has "zero respect for anyone who identifies as Muslim", and accused Muslims of using Palestine as "a device against Israel". Palestinian students and community leaders at university campuses have accused him of Islamophobia, and his speeches have attracted protests both in support of and opposition to his controversial views.

== Early life and family ==
Mosab Hassan Yousef was born in Ramallah, in the West Bank. His father, Sheikh Hassan Yousef, is a Hamas co-founder who spent many years in Israeli prisons as a result of his militant activities. His grandfather was an imam. He is the oldest of five brothers and three sisters; in 2019, one of his brothers, Suheib Yousef, also left Hamas.

He has described his upbringing as traditional, noting that he initially supported Hamas's political stance before his later break with the group's methods. In an interview, Yousef stated he was raped when he was approximately 5-6 years old, and he did not speak up about it due to fear of an honor killing; he also stated that having to heal on his own from the rape was "a hell of a journey". Growing up, Yousef has said he wanted to be a "fighter" because that was expected of Palestinian children in the West Bank. Yousef was first arrested by the IDF when he was ten, during the First Intifada, for throwing rocks at Israeli soldiers and/or settlers. As his father's eldest son, he was seen as his heir apparent.

=== Defection to Israel ===
Yousef said that his doubts about Islam and Hamas began forming when he realized Hamas' brutality, and that he hated how Hamas used the lives of suffering civilians and children to achieve its goals. Yousef was held by Shin Bet agents in 1996. While in prison, he decided to accept a Shin Bet offer to become an informant, on the basis that,

Mosab observed firsthand the craziness of the cycle of violence. Mosab began to question who his real enemies were: the Hamas leaders who tortured their fellow Palestinian prisoners, or the Shin Bet, who arrested and imprisoned him. Over the 16 months that Mosab was in prison, the answer became clear, and this persuaded Mosab to go undercover for the Shin Bet. Gonen, whose code name was "Captain Loai," became Mosab's handler. Mosab's reports led to the arrests of several high-ranking Palestinian figures. As we worked together to prevent the deaths of hundreds of Israelis and Palestinians, the two of us became friends.

== Espionage career ==
Beginning with his release from prison in 1997, Yousef was considered the Shin Bet's most reliable source in the Hamas leadership, earning himself the nickname "The Green Prince" – using the color of the Islamist group's flag, and "prince" because of his pedigree as the son of one of the movement's founders. The intelligence he supplied to Israel led to the exposure of many Hamas cells, as well as the prevention of dozens of suicide bombings and assassination attempts on Jews. He has said that he did not inform for money, but rather that his motivations were ideological and religious, and that he only wanted to save lives.

Yousef says he supplied intelligence only on the condition that the "targets" would not be killed, but arrested. This led to the detention of several key Palestinian leaders, including Ibrahim Hamid, a Hamas commander in the West Bank, and Marwan Barghouti. Yousef also claims to have thwarted a 2001 plot to assassinate Shimon Peres, then foreign minister and later President of Israel. According to his former Shin Bet officer, "Many people owe him their lives and don't even know it."

Yousef's brother Ouwais denounced a Haaretz report about his brother's activities, saying: "It was full of lies; it's all lies." Ouwais also revealed that the last contact between his family and Mosab took place more than a year before the news of his spying. The Haaretz report on Yousef was described by Hamas MP Mushir al-Masri as "psychological war being waged against the Palestinian people... [it] did not deserve a response". Sheikh Hassan Yousef, Mosab's father, while in an Israeli prison, disowned his son for spying for Israel.

In May 2016, talking to a Jerusalem Post conference in New York, Yousef said that at one point, he was simultaneously working for and being paid by Israel, the United States, the Palestinian Authority, and Hamas.

== Conversion to Christianity and loss of faith ==
Yousef met a British missionary in 1999 who introduced him to Christianity. Between 1999 and 2000, Yousef gradually embraced Christianity. In 2005, he was secretly baptized in Tel Aviv by an unidentified Christian tourist. He left the West Bank for the United States in 2007, and lived some time in San Diego, California, where he joined the Barabbas Road Church.

In August 2008, Yousef publicly revealed his Christianity, and renounced Hamas and the Arab leadership, thereby endangering himself and exposing his family in Ramallah to persecution by Hamas and other Islamist groups. Yousef has also claimed that his aim was to bring peace to the Middle East; he hopes to return to his homeland when there is peace.

However, in a December 2025 interview with English journalist and television host Piers Morgan, he stated that he no longer identifies as a Christian. He described his 2005 baptism as "symbolic" and said that although he is influenced by the teachings of Jesus, he has neither attended church nor prayed during the same approximately 15-year period in which he has practiced yoga.

== Political asylum in the United States ==
For a time, Yousef was threatened with deportation from the U.S., after his request for political asylum was denied, since statements in his book about working for Hamas were interpreted as "providing material support to a U.S.-designated terrorist organization", despite Yousef's explanation that they were "intended to undermine the group". His case then proceeded to the deportation stage, despite Yousef's advocates warning that he would likely be executed by the Palestinian Authority if deported to the West Bank.

On 24 June 2010, Shin Bet handler Gonen Ben Itzhak, who for 10 years worked with Yousef under the cryptonym "Loai", revealed his own identity to testify on behalf of Yousef at an immigration hearing in San Diego. Ben Itzhak described Yousef as a "true friend", and said, "he risked his life every day to prevent violence". Partially as a result of this, Immigration Court Judge Richard J. Bartolomei Jr. ruled on 30 June 2010 that Yousef would be allowed to remain in the United States after being fingerprinted and passing a routine background check. On 23 October 2023, Yousef stated that he holds United States citizenship while speaking to American journalist Jake Tapper in a televised interview.

== Views on Islam and Muslims ==
In 2016, Yousef said Islam as a whole is comparable to Nazism, and must be defeated. At a 2012 event, Yousef said "Islam is not a religion of peace." Yousef tweeted "If I have to choose between 1.6 billion Muslims and a cow, I will choose the cow." He has stated: "I have zero respect for any individual who identifies as a Muslim." In 2021, the Council on American–Islamic Relations accused Yousef of being Islamophobic, citing several past statements.

Amidst the Gaza war following the October 7 attacks of Israelis by Palestinians, Yousef said the cause of the Israeli–Palestinian conflict was not primarily driven by the occupation of the West Bank since 2000, or an argument over the distribution of land among peoples, but the "Islamic, religious identity" of Hamas, about which he said "you cannot weaponize your Islamic, religious identity against a religious minority and expect to get away with it. I have to call them out."

In March 2024, Indiana University Hillel invited Yousef to speak, provoking a backlash from student groups who accused Yousef of Islamophobia. The event was postponed. In April 2024, Students Supporting Israel hosted Yousef at Columbia University, amid allegations by opposing student groups that Yousef "promoted Islamophobia".

In May 2024, Yousef spoke at UCSD, where he said that Egypt should open up the Gaza-Egypt border so that the IDF could "burn" the city of Rafah. At the event, Yousef said he never advocated for killing Muslims. The speech was protested by students who accused Mosab Hassan Yousef of Islamophobia.

The next day, Yousef tweeted a photo of a Muslim religious leader on campus with the sentence, "Can someone do me a favor and remove him from campus so the students can focus on their education?" An open letter signed by Christian and Muslim religious leaders claimed the tweet was a threat and incitement to violence, though no threats or violence occurred.

Yousef admits that his views on Islam have caused him issues:

Most people don't want to face the truth. When I touch the religious and ideological aspect of the conflict, which is fundamental – I cannot ignore it – when I say Islam is a problem, many Jewish organizations say: Wait a moment, he will be considered an Islamophobe, that's not how we want to represent ourselves.

In August 2026, Yousef spoke at the Jewish American Summit in Los Angeles. During his speech Yousef said that "I don't want Muslims in America. Get the fuck out of the United States. Go back to the "shithouse where you came from and reform your own countries." Yousef further said "I don't give a fuck about your Quran, I don't give a fuck about your [ ] prophet, and I don't give a fuck about your entire belief system. You disgust me."

== Controversy over authenticity of beliefs ==
Walid Shoebat, a former Muslim who became a Christian Zionist, has argued that Yousef presents different versions of his beliefs depending on whether he interacts with Anglophone or Arabic media.

According to Shoebat, Yousef has promoted Palestinian liberation theology– which is anti-Israel– on Al-Arabiya and the Arabic show Daring Question. He wore a keffiyeh during his interview with Daring Question, and on Al-Arabiya he stated "we will have our victory against Israel" and that "Israel is the problem and as an occupation it needs to end".

Also, according to Arutz Sheva (Israel National News), Yousef, interviewed on Al-Hayat TV, stated:

I do not encourage anyone to give information to Israel or collaborate with Israel. If anyone hears me right now and they are in relation to Israeli security I advise them to work for the interest of their own people – number one – and do not work with the [Israeli] enemy against the interest of our people. They should collaborate with the Palestinian Authority only.

== Autobiography and documentaries ==
Yousef's co-authored autobiography, Son of Hamas: A Gripping Account of Terror, Betrayal, Political Intrigue, and Unthinkable Choices, written with the assistance of Ron Brackin, was published in March 2010. Son of Hamas was on The New York Times Best Seller list for two weeks in March 2010.

Yousef collaborated with US-based actor and film producer Sam Feuer in the production of two films: a feature film adaptation of Yousef's book Son of Hamas and documentary The Green Prince, and a historical depiction of the life of the Muslim prophet Muhammad based on the accounts of eighth-century historian Ibn Ishaq. A documentary adaptation of Son of Hamas titled The Green Prince, directed and written by Nadav Schirman, premiered at the 2014 Sundance Film Festival, where it won the Audience Award for World Cinema: Documentary. The Green Prince will be re-made into a live-action feature film.

=== Published works ===
- Hassan Yousef, Mosab (2010). Son of Hamas: A Gripping Account of Terror, Betrayal, Political Intrigue, and Unthinkable Choices (First ed.). Carol Stream, Illinois: Tyndale Momentum. ISBN 978-1-4143-3307-6.
- Hassan Yousef, Mosab; Becket, James (2024). From Hamas to America: My Story of Defying Terror, Facing the Unimaginable, and Finding Redemption in the Land of Opportunity (1st ed.). Forefront Books. ISBN 978-1637633182.

== See also ==
- Public diplomacy of Israel
- Israeli public diplomacy in the Gaza war
