= Witnesses in Uniform =

Israeli Holocaust commemoration program

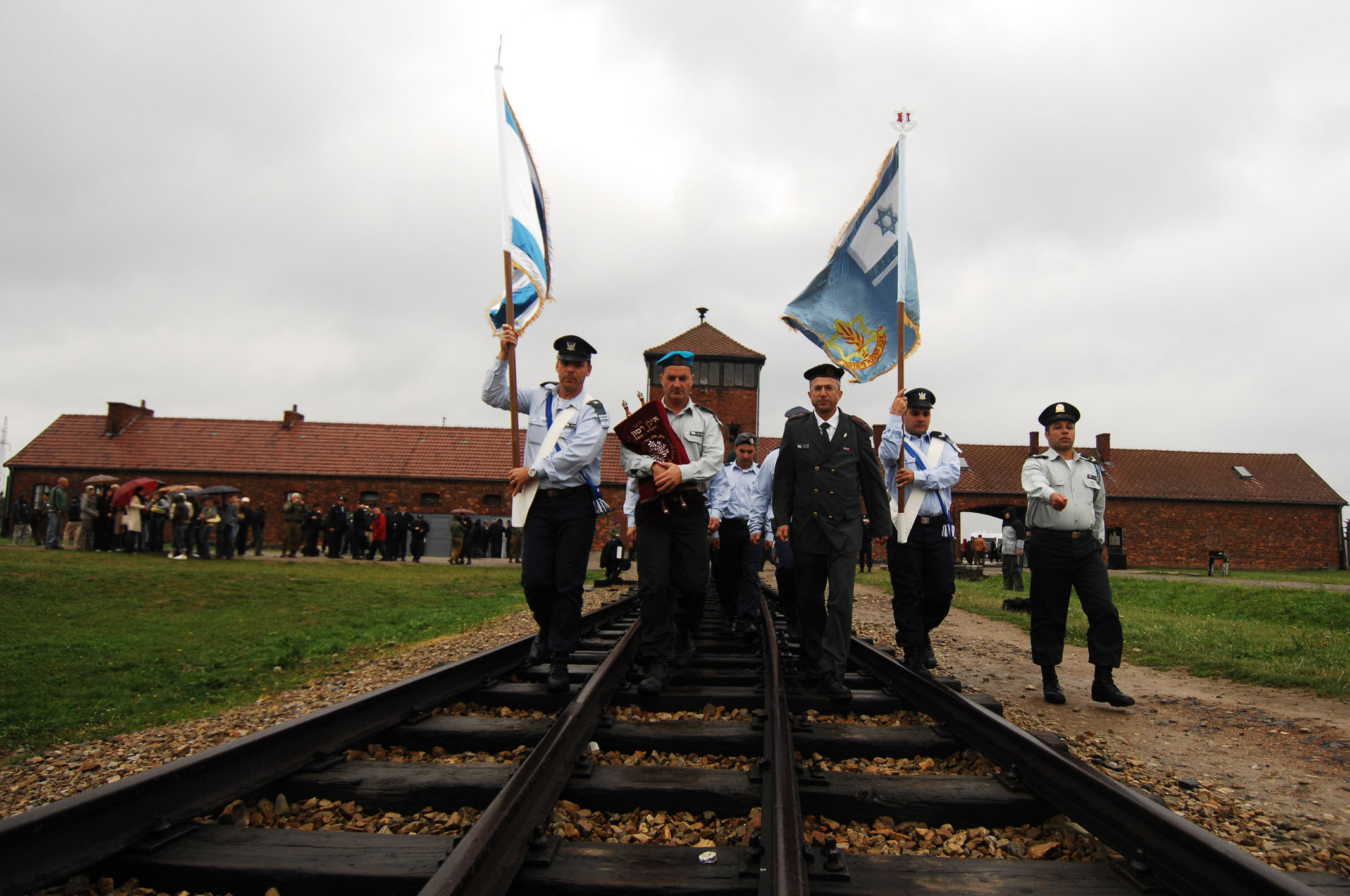
IDF "Witnesses in Uniform" delegation march into the Auschwitz-Birkenau camp (2012)

Witnesses in Uniform (Hebrew: עדים במדים, romanized: edim b'madim) is a program according to which the delegations made of soldiers and veterans of the Israel Defense Forces, members of the Israel Police and other uniformed services, and family members of the fallen soldiers are sent to Poland to commemorate the Holocaust and learn about it. It usually includes a Holocaust survivor who tells their story and guides from Yad Vashem. The delegations visit Nazi death camps, as well as synagogues, cemeteries, memorials, to learn about the pre-war Jewish history, and the historical background to the Nazi's "Final Solution" to the Jewish question.

The first delegation of this kind was sent to Auschwitz-Birkenau in 2001.

In early 2022 the IDF announced that the program will be moved from Poland to Lithuania, due to the recent crisis in the Israel-Poland relations. Grant Arthur Gochin, American diplomat and researcher on Jewish affairs on Lithuania criticized the solution, alleging that the Lithuanian state is notorious in distorting The Holocaust in Lithuania.

Similar programs are Youth Trip to Poland (Israel), Flower to Survivor (visiting the Holocaust survivors, Israel; Media related to Flower to Survivor at Wikimedia Commons) and March of the Living (international).

On 31 July 2025, outside Auschwitz, a Polish police officer asked a delegation of 180 to lower there Israeli flags. The group complied. One group member said they have never been asked to lower flags before. The Auschwitz Birkenau Museum said (on social media) they had not been notified in advance.

== See also ==
- Holocaust tourism
