= Moshe Karadi =

Israeli police chief

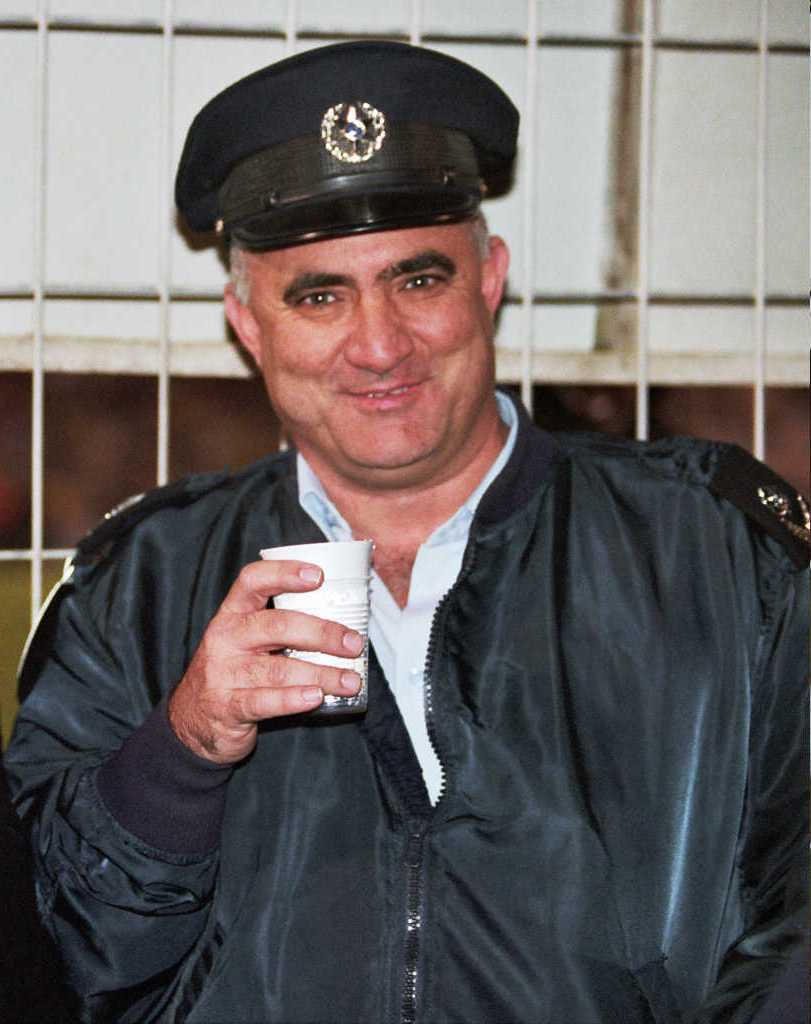
Moshe Karadi

Moshe Karadi (Hebrew: משה קראדי; born 1960) is a former Israeli police officer and general commissioner of the Israel Police between 2004 and May 1, 2007.

Karadi was born and raised in Bat Yam, and currently resides in Rishon LeZion. He is married with three children.

Karadi has a bachelor's degree in criminology from the Bar Ilan University and a master's degree in public administration from the University of Haifa.

Karadi served in the Paratroopers Brigade in the Israel Defense Forces and attained the rank of major. He left the army in 1984 and immediately joined the Israel Border Police.

In 1991 he became the commander of the Old City border police, and in 1996 became the commander of the Lakhish Region.

He became the commander of the police's Southern Command in October 2002 and from there appointed general commissioner on August 1, 2004. During this time, he oversaw the preparation and participation of the police in Israel's unilateral disengagement plan of the summer of 2005. Karadi was criticized for some of the police suppressive tactics used against protesters.

Karadi resigned his position on February 18, 2007, following the publicity of the findings of the Zeiler Commission, and continued his post until May 1, 2007, when Dudi Cohen, the next general commissioner, assumed office.
