= Hassan Yousef (Hamas leader) =

Co-founder of Hamas (born 1955)

Sheikh Hassan Yousef
- حسن يوسف

Personal details
- Born: 1955 (age 70–71) Ramallah, Jordanian West Bank
- Party: Hamas
- Spouse: Sabba Abu Salem
- Children: 9 (including Mosab Hassan Yousef)

Hassan Yousef (Arabic: حسن يوسف; born 1955) is a Palestinian militant and politician and co-founder of Hamas.

He is considered a member of Hamas's extremist faction and refrains from any talk of rapprochement between Israelis and Palestinians. He is also considered one of the spiritual leaders of Hamas.

Yousef is married to Sabba Abu Salem. They have six sons and three daughters. His eldest son, Mosab Hassan Yousef, worked undercover with Shin Bet from 1997 to 2007, saying that he did so to prevent attacks on Israeli civilians, as he considered such attacks immoral and destructive to the Palestinian cause.

On 2 July 2019, Hassan's youngest son, Suheib Hassan Yousef, appeared in an interview with Israeli television criticizing Hamas and describing it as a corrupt terrorist organization. In response, members of Hamas described him as a traitor and a collaborator, while other Hamas-affiliated networks accused him of working with the Mossad. Suheib Yousef denied these accusations.

== Politics and arrests ==
Yousef has been arrested by the Israeli authorities several times, starting from 1993. He became the visible leader of the Second Intifada. According to the Palestinian Information Center, Yousef has spent over 23 years in Israeli prisons.

While in jail in 2005, Yousef was nominated to represent Hamas during the elections. This was against his will, as he did not think that Hamas should become a political party. He was initially unwilling to accept the nomination, but eventually agreed, when he found out that his eldest son had received death threats.

On October 19, 2015, during the ongoing Palestinian unrest, Israel Defense Forces (IDF) raided Yousef's home in Beitunia in the West Bank and arrested him, accusing him of inciting violence. He was released on August 31, 2017. A few months later, in December he was again arrested by Israeli authorities and held until October 2018. Each time he was held in Administrative detention, meaning incarceration without trial or charge. On 3 October 2020, he was arrested again. In October 2023, he was arrested again as part of Israel's wider crackdown on Hamas following the 2023 Hamas attack on Israel. On 11 June 2026, his son Owais Yousef said that he was released by Israel.
