= Beit Aghion =

Official residence of the Prime Minister of Israel

Coordinates: 31°46′24″N 35°13′04″E

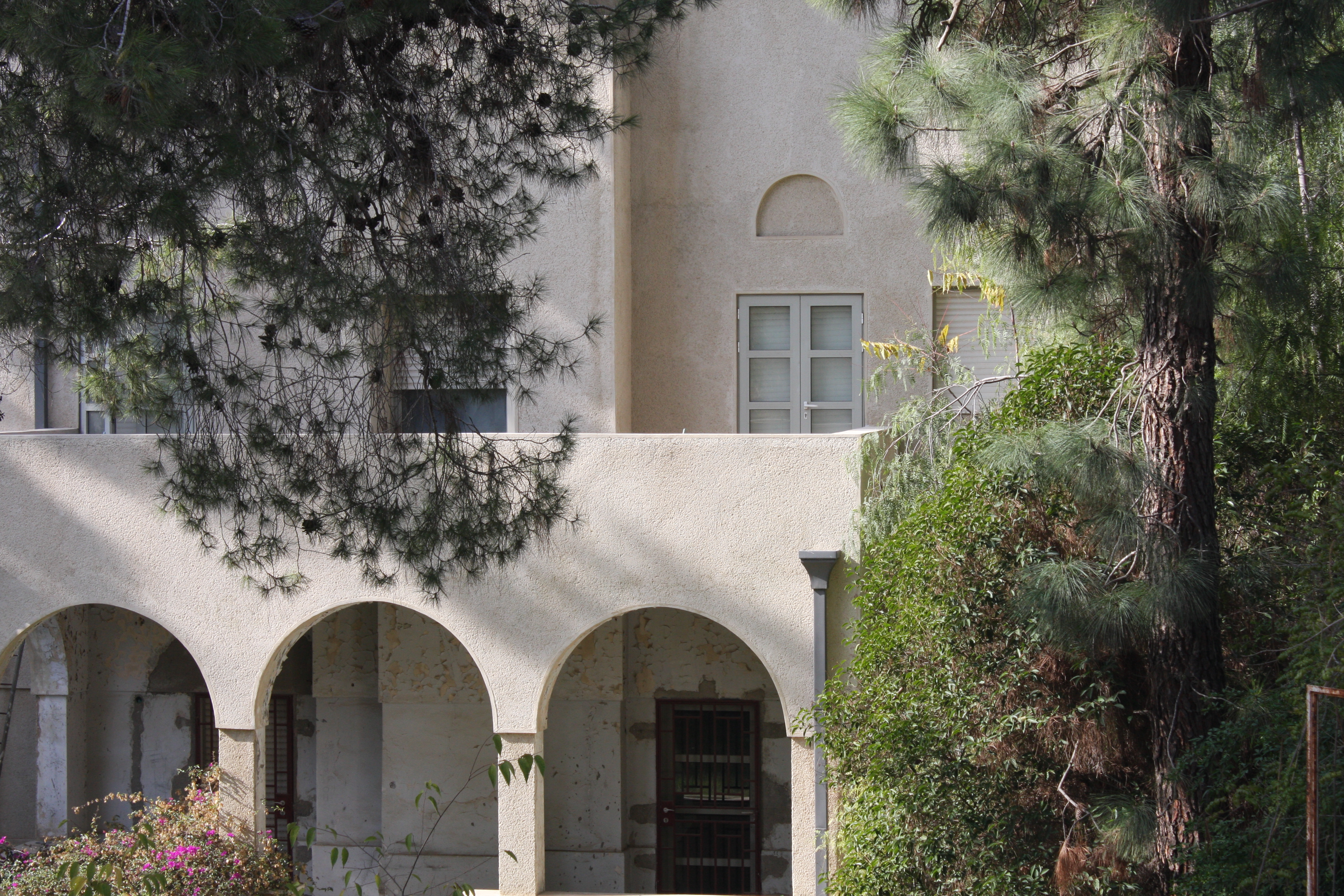
Beit Julius Jacobs, the PM's residence until 1974

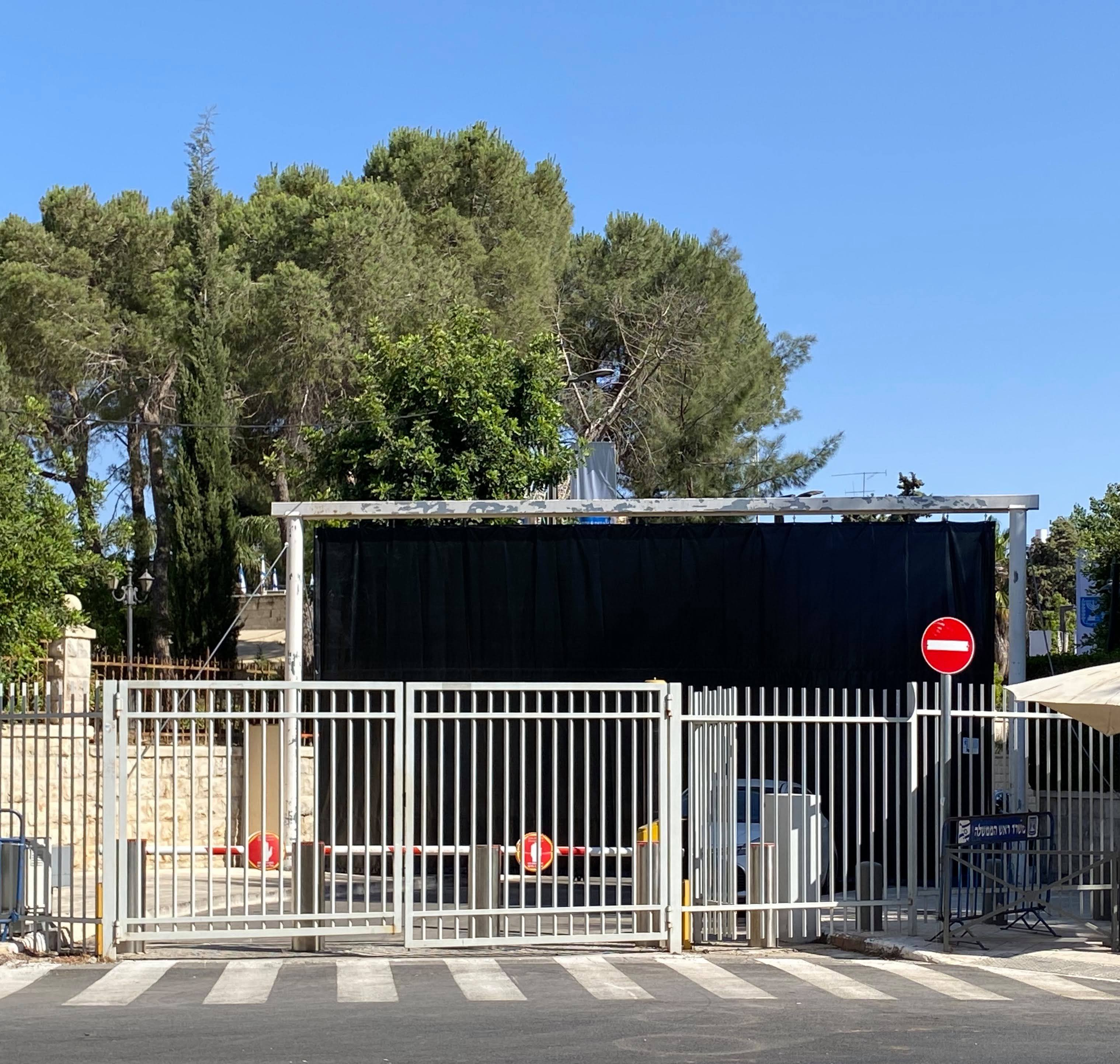
The black curtain on Balfour Street in Jerusalem, which hides the entrance to the prime minister's residence

Beit Aghion (Hebrew: בית אגיון, Aghion House), also known as Beit Rosh HaMemshala (Hebrew: בית ראש הממשלה, lit. House of the prime minister) or metonymously as Balfour, is the official residence of the prime minister of Israel. It is located at 9 Smolenskin Street, on the corner of Balfour Street in the upscale central Jerusalem neighborhood of Rehavia.

== History ==
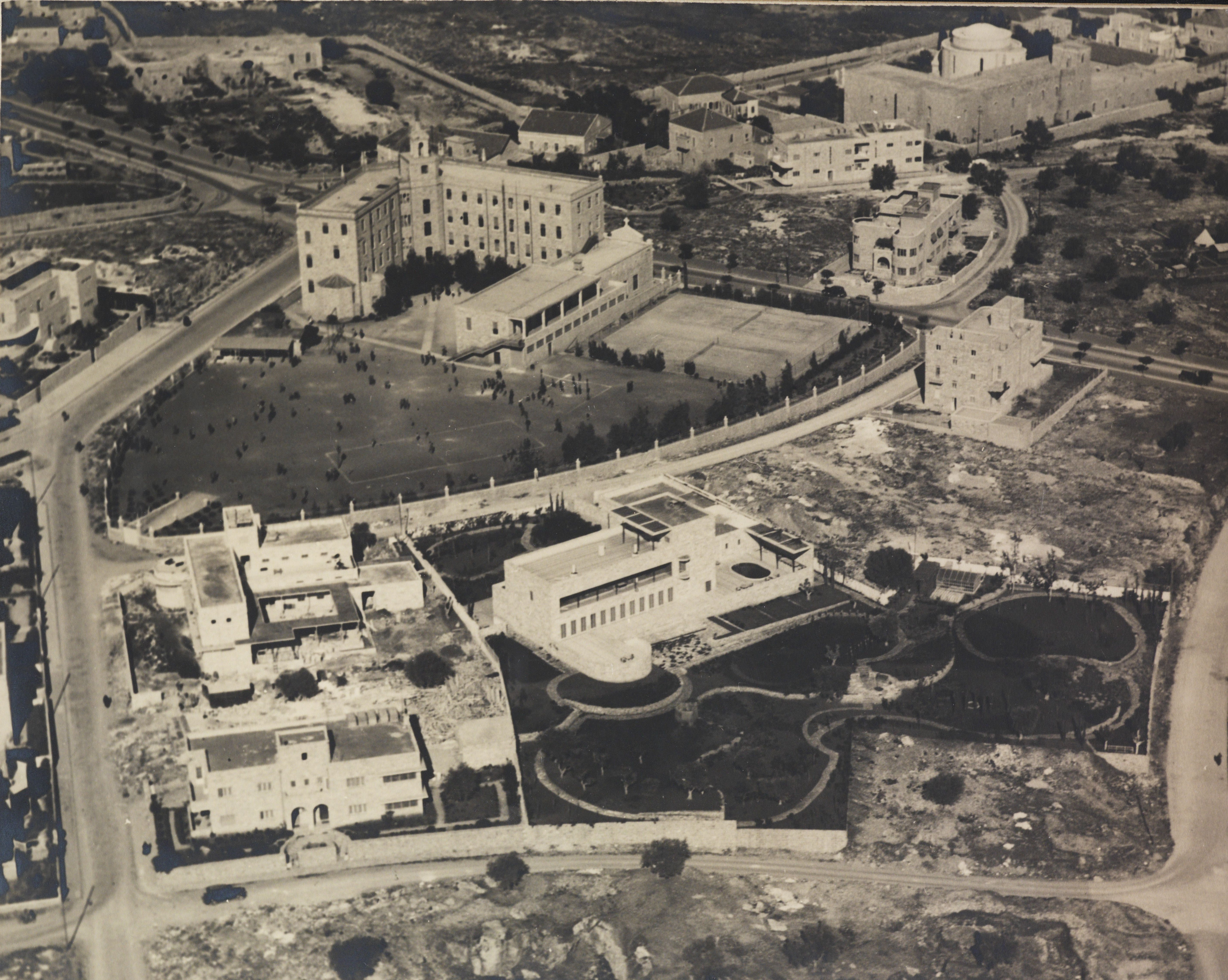
1938

The house was built between 1936 and 1938 for Greek-Jewish merchant Edward Aghion, an affluent resident of Alexandria in Egypt. It was designed by German architect Richard Kauffmann.

In 1941, Peter II, King of Yugoslavia resided in the house. During the 1948 Arab–Israeli War it served as a hospital for the Irgun fighters.

In 1952, the Israeli government purchased the house for the purpose of turning it into an official residence for the Foreign Minister. In 1974, the Israeli Government decided to transfer the official residence of the Prime Minister from Julius Jacobs House, which had served as the official residence of the Israeli Prime Minister between 1950 and 1974, to Beit Aghion. During the 1990s, a wall was erected around the house for security reasons and a segment of Balfour Street was closed to traffic.

Prime Minister Benjamin Netanyahu resided in Beit Aghion until July 2021, more than a month after he was ousted from office by a coalition headed by Naftali Bennett and Yair Lapid. Since then, renovations have been underway at Beit Aghion. During their terms as Prime Minister, Bennett remained in his family residence in Ra'anana and Lapid largely lived in Tel Aviv during his tenure as prime minister.

== Architecture ==
The building is composed of several square blocks connected to one another and in the center of the building there is a stairway, decorated with a row of windows in the front. The front of the building also includes a section molded in a circular way, and in a boat-like fashion typical of the International Style. The house is coated with Jerusalem stone. The premises include an inner courtyard (patio)—an element that differs from the common International Style, but is common among Islamic-style buildings.

== Proposed residence relocation ==
On 8 February 2009, the Israeli government approved the Almog Project, which provided that the official residence of the Prime Minister be united with his office within the government complex, thus replacing Beit Aghion. The cost of that planned project was around 650 million shekels ($162 million USD), and thus was criticized as overly extravagant. On 5 April, the decision to move the official residence of the Prime Minister of Israel was canceled.

In 2014, the Almog plan was re-initiated. However, in October 2018, its advancement was halted. In 2019, the Prime Minister's Office began developing an alternative plan, in another location on the Government Campus in Jerusalem − the "Shira" project. Additionally, it was recommended that until a new building is constructed, the Prime Minister's Office should rectify and repair safety and protection deficiencies in the Beit Aghion.

Nevertheless, Beit Aghion has not been renovated since Netanyahu vacated in July 2021, nor has the building of a new residence been initiated. Since Netanyahu returned to office in 2023, he has resided in his homes in Caesarea and on Gaza Road in Jerusalem.

=== Project Shira ===
Project Shira (Hebrew: פרויקט שירה) is a project and initiative focused on the construction of a new integrated building that will serve as the official residence of the Prime Minister of Israel, as well as the Prime Minister's Office. The project is situated between the current buildings of the Prime Minister's Office and the Ministry of the Interior in Kiryat HaLeom, Jerusalem. The project's cost is estimated to be in the hundreds of millions of shekels, nearing a billion shekels (equivalent to $150,000,000+).

Initially, the project was assigned to the "Kimel Eshkolot" architectural office. According to officials from the Prime Minister's Office, if it is decided to approve the "Shira" project, it will take about six years until its completion.

On June 30, 2024, Netanyahu's government approved NIS 37.5 million to build the new compound.

== See also ==
- Prime Minister of Israel
- Office of the Prime Minister (Israel)
- Beit HaNassi
- Ben Gurion House
