= Hero of Israel (statue) =

Statue created by Israeli artist Itay Zalait

- גיבור ישראל (Hebrew)
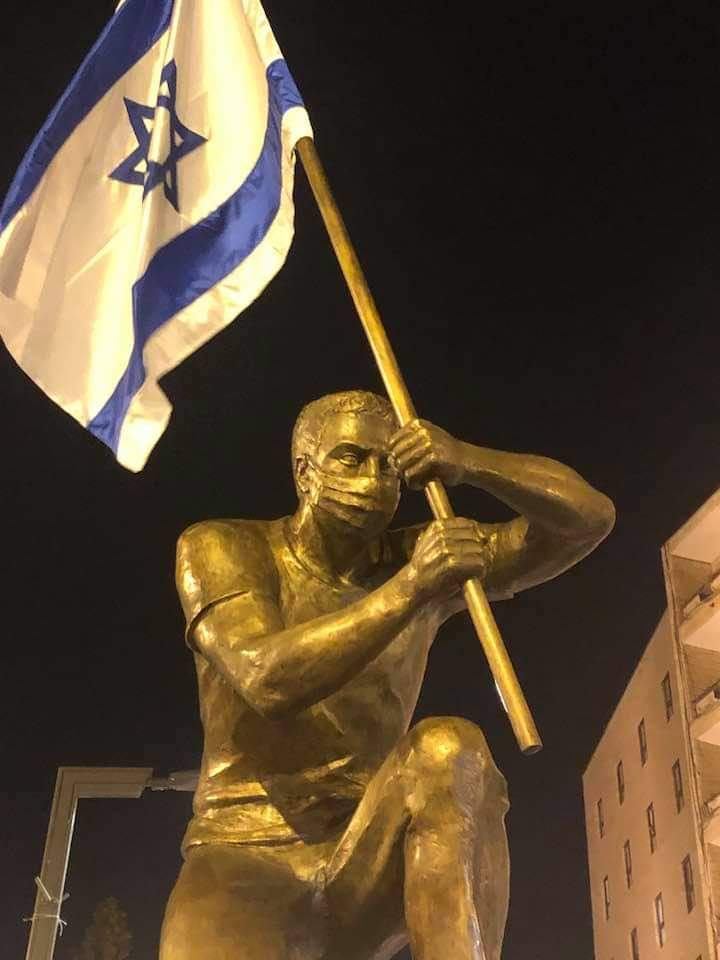
- Hero of Israel statue at Paris Square in Jerusalem
- Artist: Itay Zalait
- Year: 2020
- Type: Bronze
- Medium: sculpture
- Movement: Dada; Avant-garde
- Dimensions: 550 cm (220 in)
- Weight: 6 tons
- Location: Tel-Aviv, Israel

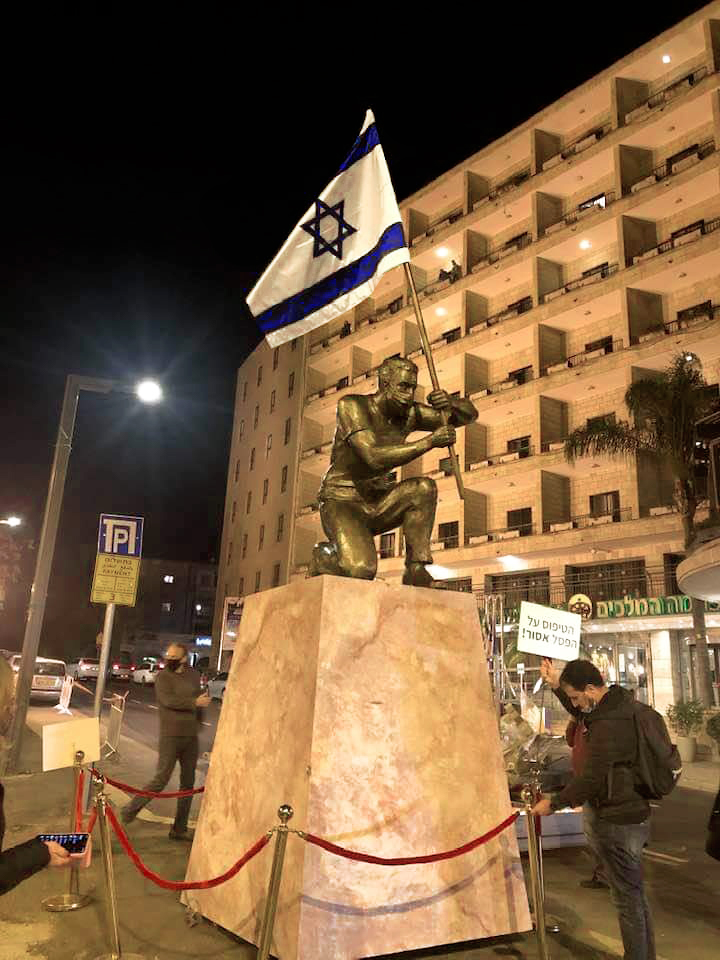
Hero of Israel statue by artist Itay Zalait

Hero of Israel (Hebrew: גיבור ישראל, Gibor Yisrael) is the name of a 900 kg bronze statue which stands on a 5-ton base. The statue is 5.5 meters tall and was placed at Paris Square, near the Prime Minister's residence, in Jerusalem on December 4, 2020 by Israeli artist Itay Zalait as a protest exhibition and an homage to the ongoing protests against Benjamin Netanyahu. The statue depicts a protester wearing a mask and kneeling with an Israeli flag in his hand. The flag was specially sown out of dacron for the exhibit.

According to Zalait, the statue is an homage to all the heroines and heroes of Israel fighting for their homeland, whoever they might be, while solidifying the image of the protester on the historic spectrum of the State of Israel.

== The inspiration ==
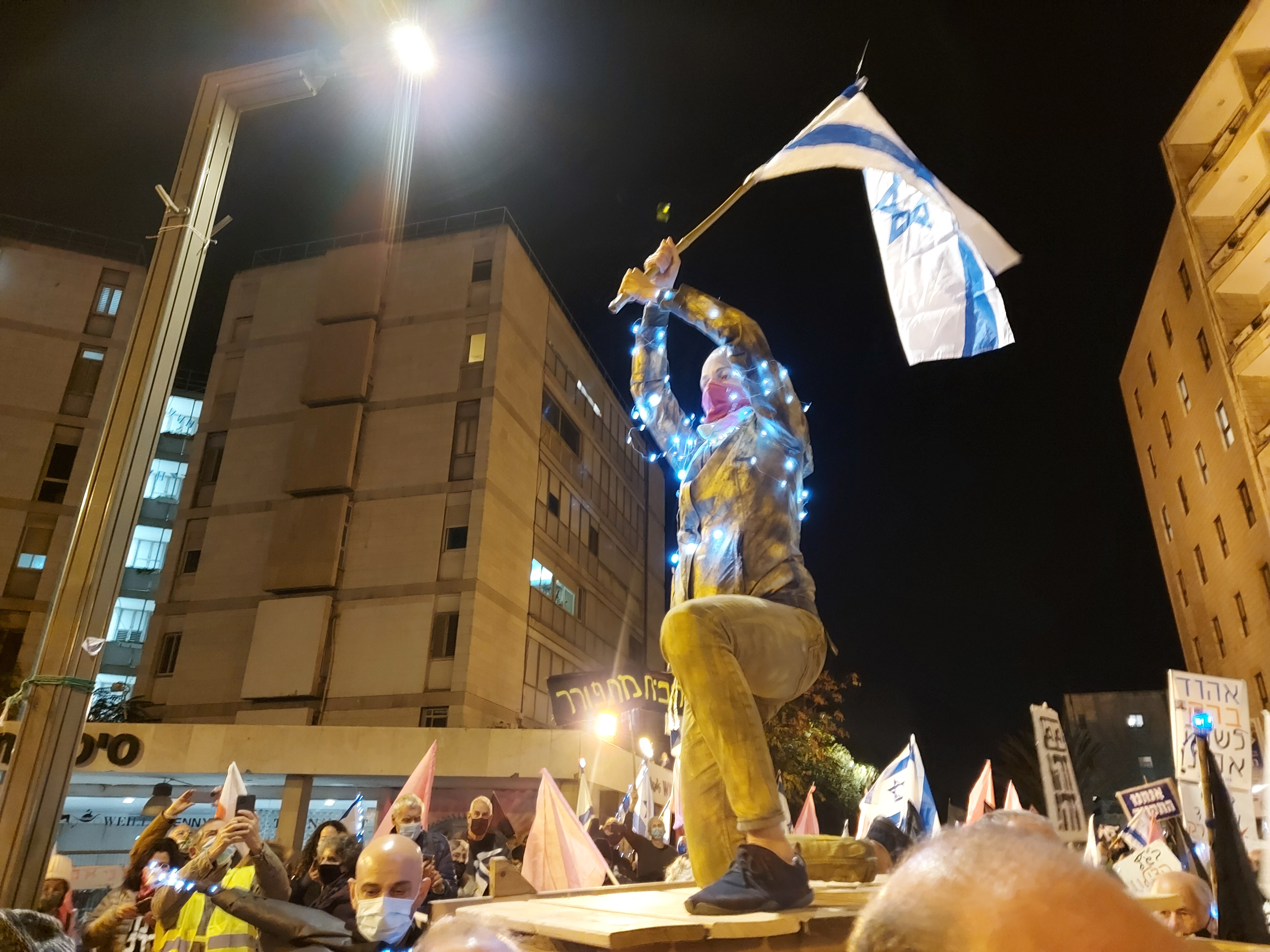
Homage to the Hero of Israel statue at Paris Square in Jerusalem, 5 December 2020

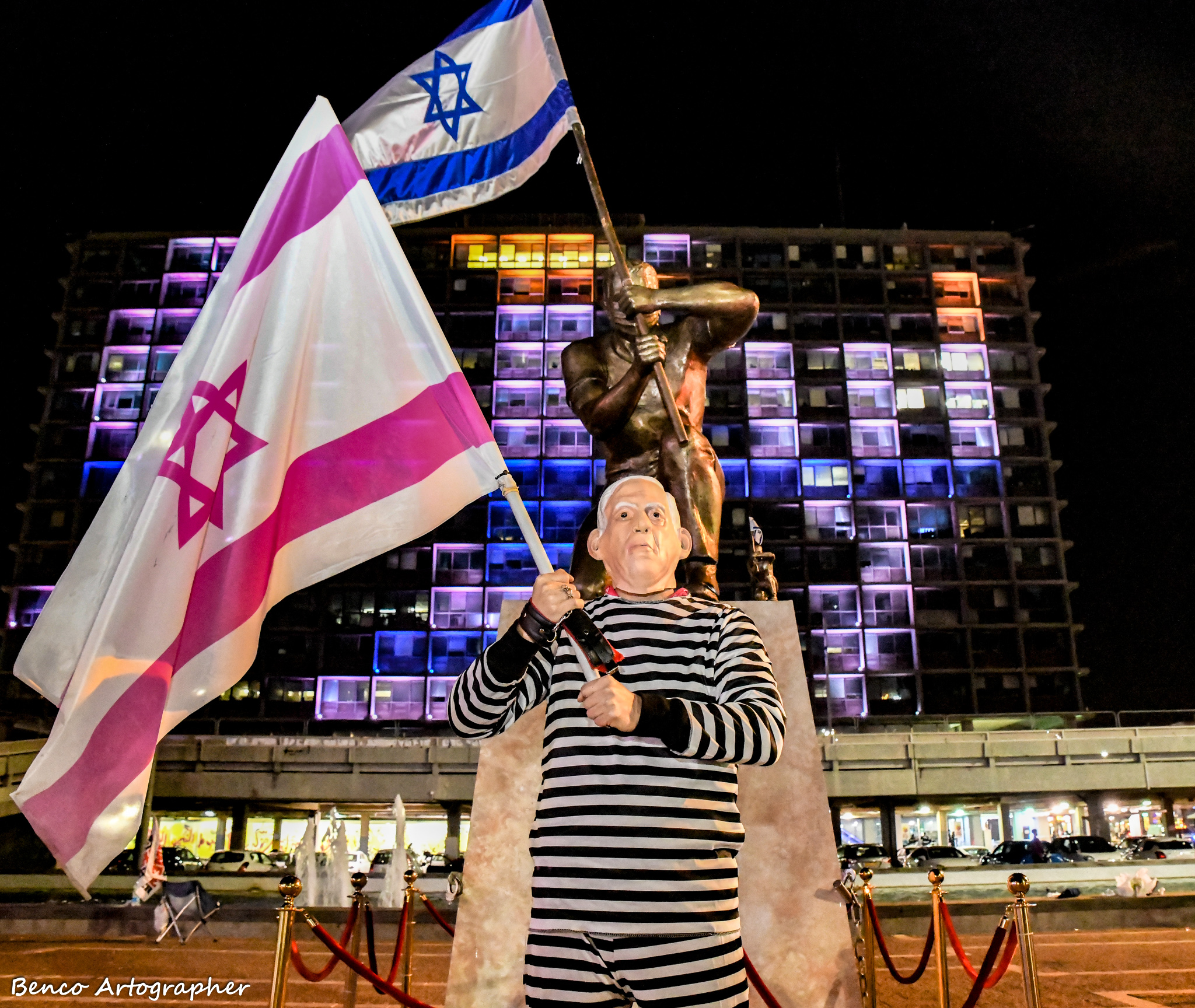
Protester dressed up as Benjamin Netanyahu on the backdrop of the Hero of Israel statue and the Tel Aviv Municipality building.

The statue was inspired by the now-famous July 2020 photo by AP photographer Oded Balilty of Nimrod Gross, a protester holding the Israeli flag in full force while being sprayed forcefully by a police water cannon. The photo received widespread publicity on social media and in the press and became a symbol of the protests. While the statue was inspired by this event, the figure it represents is generic.

Zalait also stated that he was influenced by the Italian artist Arturo Di Modica who in 1987 placed the Charging Bull statue on Wall Street at the New York Stock Exchange and also was inspired by the Ink Flag and of the iconic photograph, Raising the Flag on Iwo Jima. The decision to create the statue took shape on the morning after he had placed his previous exhibit, The Last Supper, at Rabin Square on July 28, 2020.

== Events following the placement of the statue ==
The placement of the statue at Paris Square in Jerusalem, which lasted 25 minutes, caused widespread excitement among protesters and the public in the area. Zalait explained the meaning behind the statue to the audience and stated that the statue will take part in the regular protests at the square on Saturday evenings.

In spite of the Sabbath, at 3:00am, enforcers of the Jerusalem municipality, arrived with a police escort and a crane in order to remove the statue from the square. Attorney Gonen Ben Itzhak quickly drove to Jerusalem in an attempt to prevent the removal of the statue from the premises. He demanded the enforcers show him a document pertaining the legality of the statue's confiscation and was refused.

The statue's creator, Zalait, laid down on the statue, refused to leave it and was subsequently forcefully arrested by police, detained and later released. The statue was confiscated by Jerusalem Municipality enforcers.

Both Jerusalem Municipality and the Police disclaimed any responsibility for the removal of the statue. Later on, city officials claimed that they removed the statue because it posed a security hazard. The Municipality ignored the certification of a structural engineer working for the protest movement and did not demand to be shown the structure's certification before the removal of the statue.

After being released, Zalait stated that the statue had a structural certification by an engineer and that 50 policemen had shown up in order to remove it, desecrated the Sabbath, pulled him and injured him, all for the sake of not showing the statue to protesters on Saturday evening. Zalait, who funded the statue himself and without any political backing, began a crowdfunding campaign in order to raise 450,000 shekels for his expenses in creating the statue. As of December 12, 2020, 160,000 shekels were.

On Saturday evening, December 5, protests in Jerusalem included protest exhibitions, as homages to the confiscated statue, of people striking a pose as that of the statue.

== The placement of the statue at Rabin Square in Tel Aviv ==
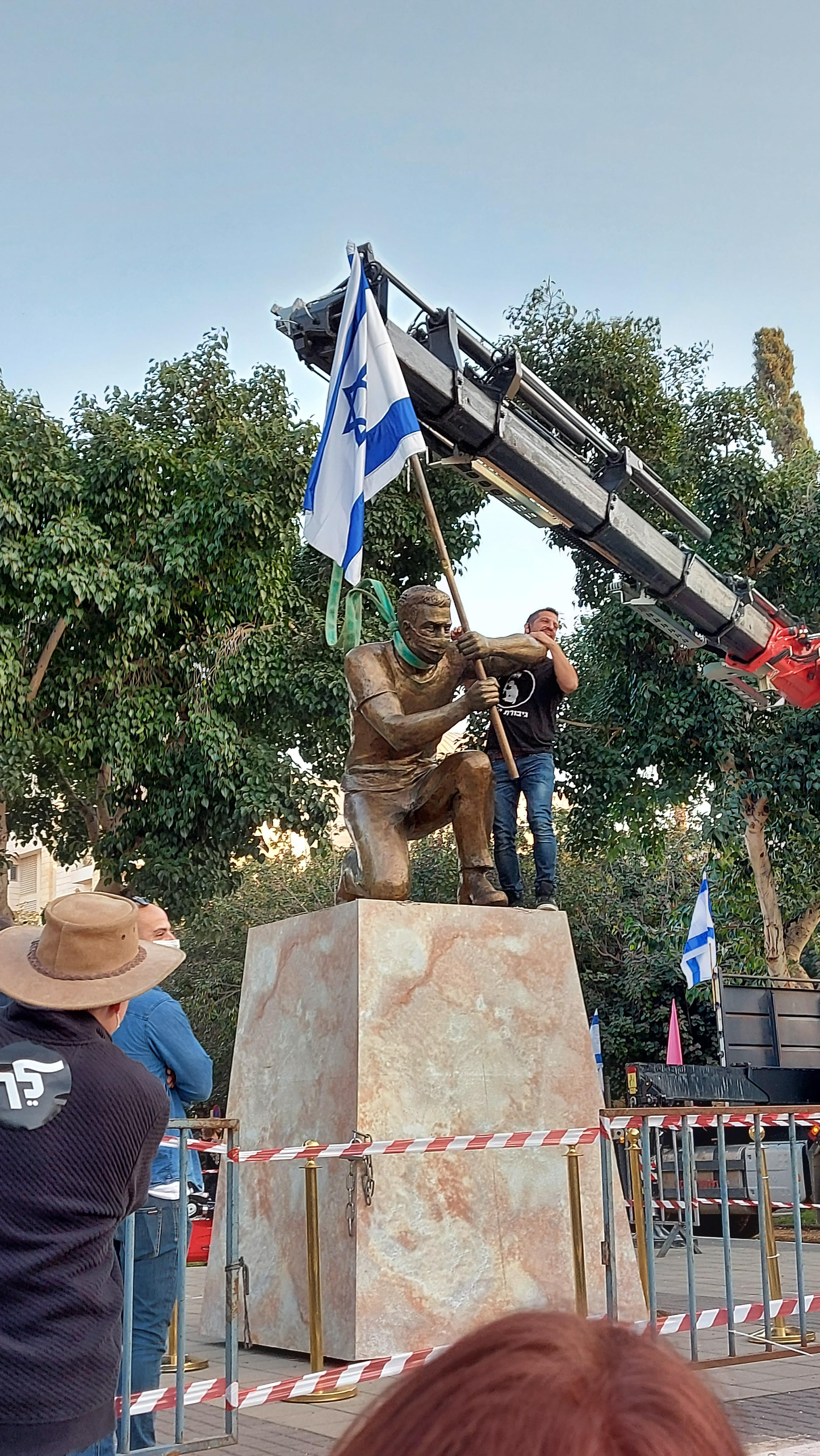
Hero of Israel was placed in Ramat Hasharon on January 1, 2021

Following the removal of the statue from Paris Square in Jerusalem, the mayor of Tel-Aviv, Ron Huldai decided to invite artist Itay Zalait to place the statue at Rabin Square. The statue arrived at Rabin Square on Thursday, December 10, 2020 after it was released earlier that day from Jerusalem Municipality's warehouse at Har Homa. The statue was received by hundreds of protesters bearing pink and black flags and carrying protest signs while chanting protest songs, journalists and an array of protest paintings along the railing of the square. The placing of the statue was delayed following an incident in which a Netanyahu sympathizer blocked the truck which was carrying the statue to the square while claiming that there is no approval for placing the statue in the square and that the statue exhibit is illegitimate all while protesting against the media. Explanations which were given to him regarding the statue's legitimacy did not change his mind. Tel Aviv Police were summoned to the area and the protester was removed.

The placement of the statue was done by approval of Tel Aviv Municipality from Thursday until Sunday December 13, 2020. Mayor Ron Huldai tweeted a photo of the statue with the Tel Aviv Municipality building in the background with the text which said: "The protester will continue to protest, and in the end there will be light. Happy Holiday." (Hanukkah).

Zalait stated that the placement of the statue in Rabin Square in Tel Aviv is temporary and that he intends to bring back the statue to Paris Square in Jerusalem with the approval of the Jerusalem Municipality.

== Documentary film ==
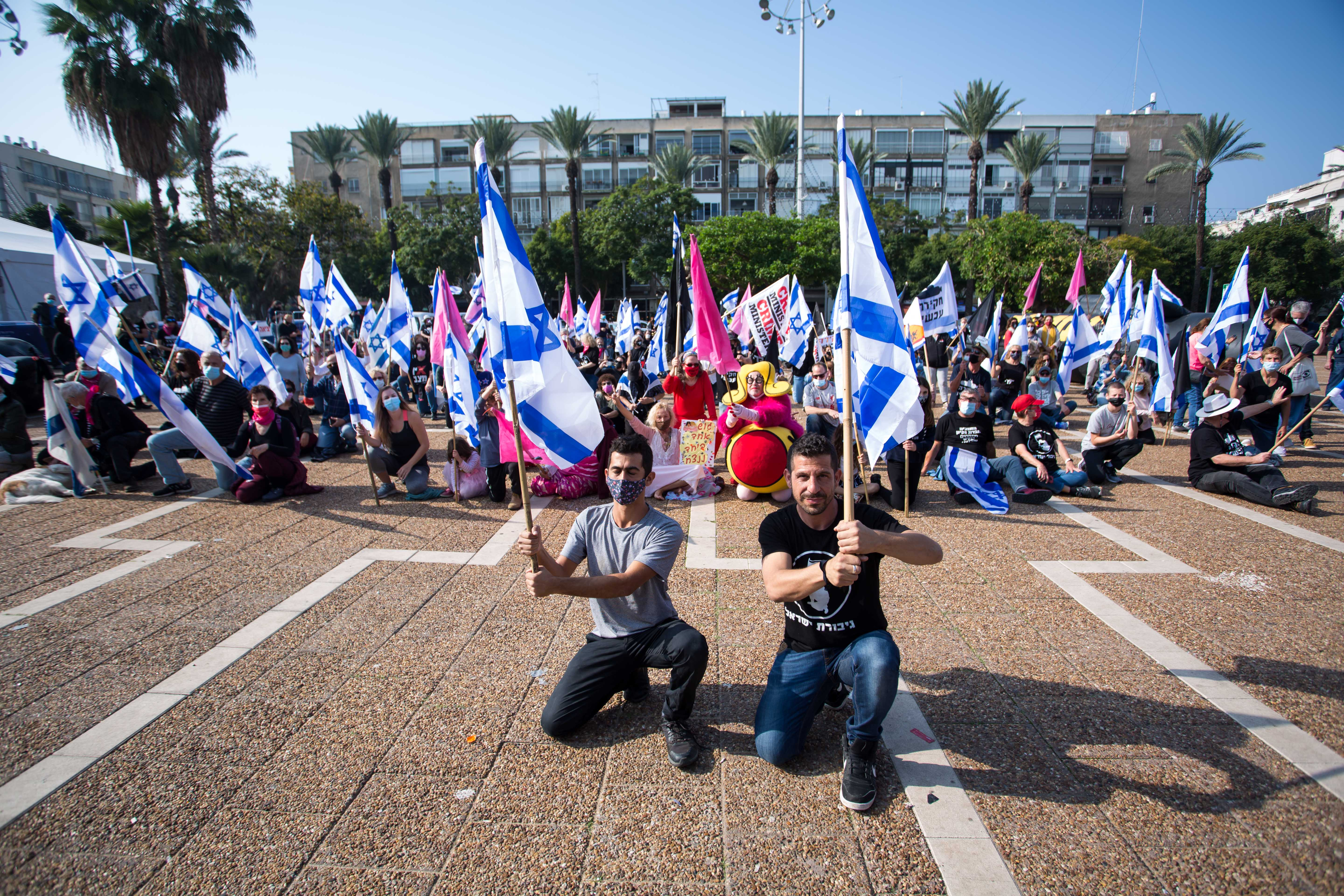
A multi-participant photo in Rabin Square next to the sculpture Hero of Israel, with the photographers standing in the position of the sculpture with a flag. In the front of the photo on the right is Itai Zlait and next to him on the left is Nimrod Gross, who was holding the Israeli flag in a photograph inspired by the sculpture.

Beginning in August 2020, when work on the statue had begun, a cooperation agreement between artist Zalait and Israel's Channel 8 (HOT) was forged towards the production of a documentary film which follows the process of creating the statue, which was to be filmed by Itay Raziel. After two months, communications ceased and the production of the film was entrusted in the hands of director and producer Anna Holider while the cinematographer was replaced by Gil Shapiro who received access to previously shot footage.

Shapiro continued to follow the statue's creation process which lasted four months in cooperation with fifteen volunteers and followed its erection at Paris Square in Jerusalem and Rabin Square in Tel-Aviv and all subsequent events pertaining to the statue.
