= Tel Aviv City Hall =

Town hall of Tel Aviv, Israel

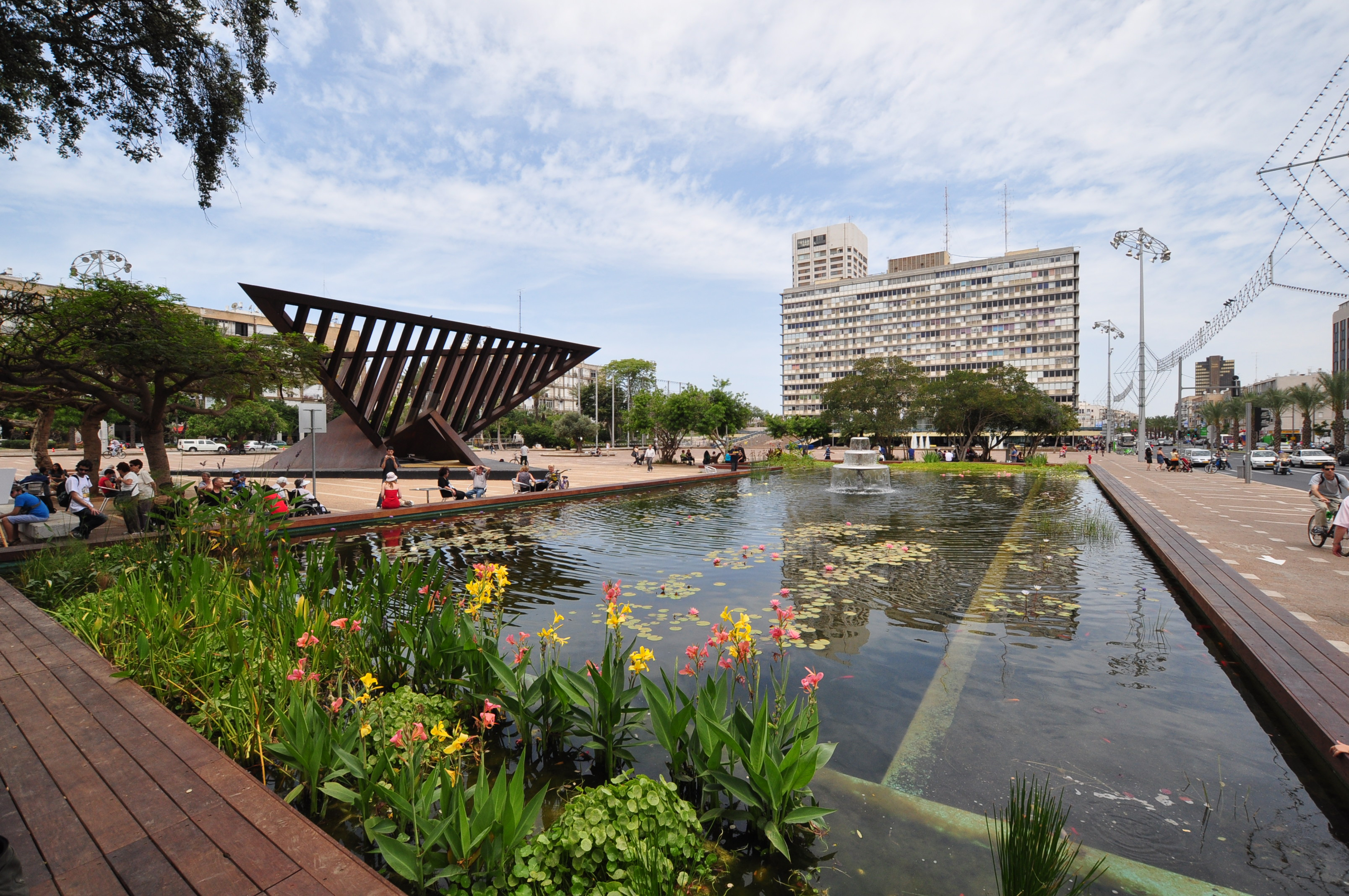
- Tel Aviv City Hall, view from Rabin Square
- Interactive map of the Tel Aviv City Hall area

General information
- Architectural style: Brutalism
- Location: 69 Ibn Gvirol Street, Tel Aviv, Israel
- Coordinates: 32°04′55″N 34°46′50″E
- Completed: 1966

Design and construction
- Architect: Menachem Cohen

Tel Aviv City Hall (Hebrew: בית עיריית תל אביב, romanized: Beit Iriyat Tel Aviv) is the municipal government center of Tel Aviv, Israel. It houses the mayor's office, meeting chambers, and offices of the Tel Aviv City Council.

== History ==
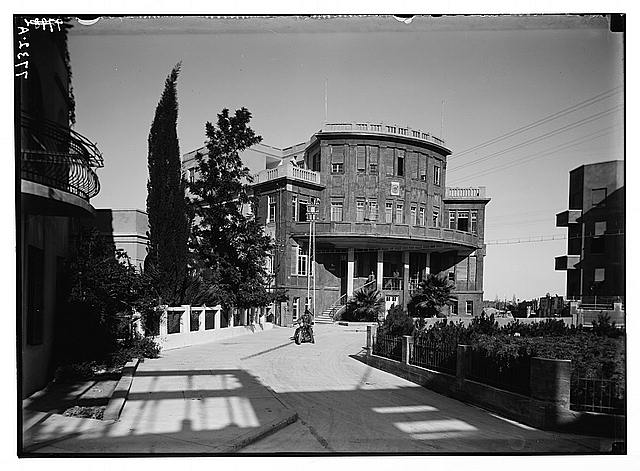
Old Tel Aviv City Hall, 1930s

The Tel Aviv municipality was initially located on Rothschild Boulevard. When more office space was needed, the municipality rented a hotel on Bialik Street, near the home of national poet Chaim Nachman Bialik, which had been commissioned by the Skora family in 1924 and built by Moshe Czerner. The hotel had opened for business in 1925 but was deemed unprofitable due to the lack of tourists. In 1928, the municipality bought the hotel. Later, it housed a courthouse on the ground floor.

A new city hall was designed in the 1950s by architect Menachem Cohen, in the Brutalist style. The large plaza at the foot of the building, first named Kings of Israel Square and renamed to Rabin Square in 1995 following Prime Minister Yitzhak Rabin was assassinated at this spot, was designed as a central area for public events and ceremonies. It is located on Ibn Gabirol Street.

In 1972, the old Skora building was converted into a museum for the history of Tel Aviv. In 2006, the municipality hired an architectural firm to carry out restoration work on the building.

The building has been used many times to display solidarity with other countries in times of disasters and terrorist attacks. In 2017, the city hall was lit up in Egyptian flag following the Minya bus attack and the Spanish flag after the Barcelona attacks. In 2020, The Hall showed the Lebanese flag after the 2020 Beirut Explosion. In 2023, it was lit up in solidarity with Turkey after the 2023 Turkey–Syria earthquakes.

== Gallery ==
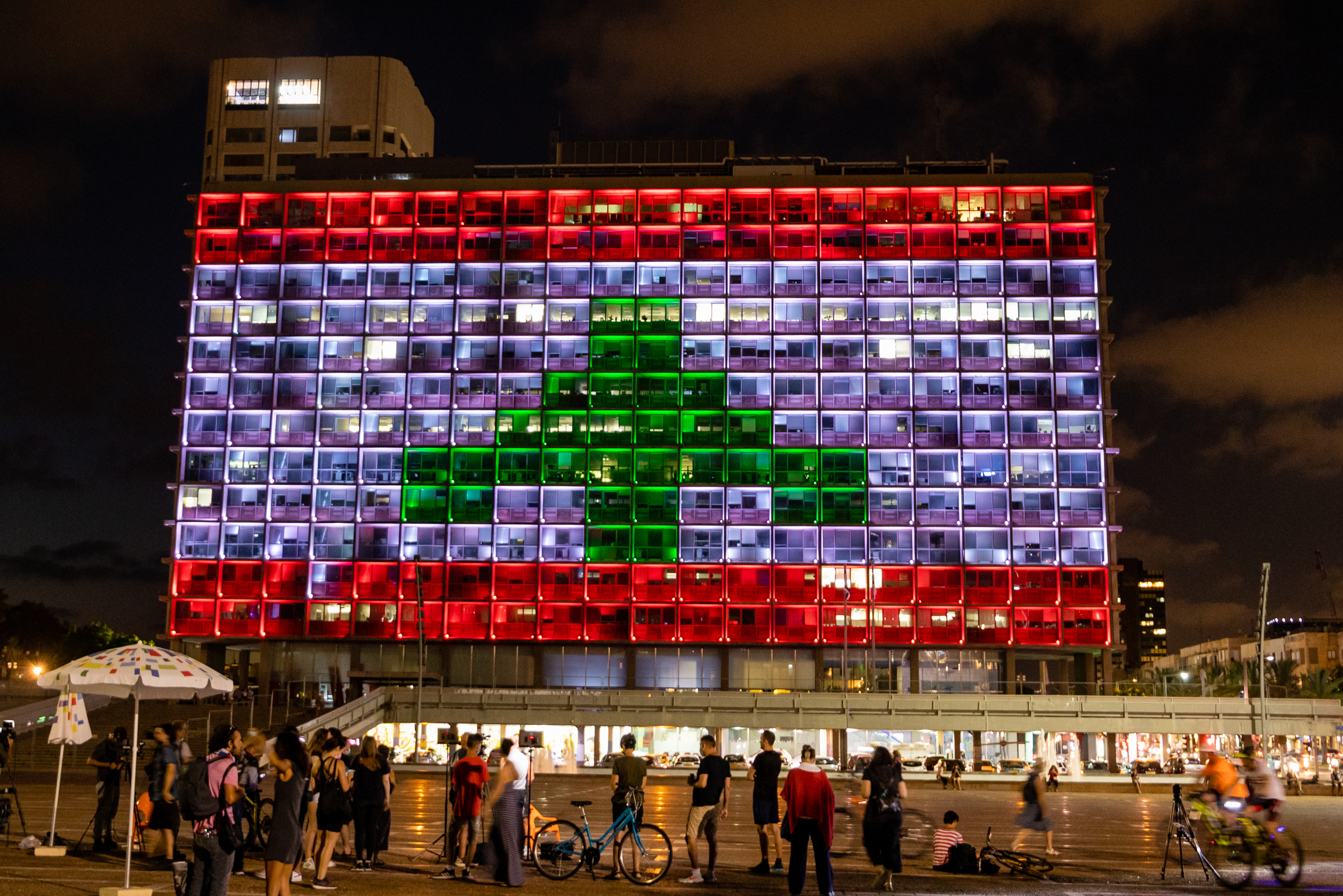
Tel Aviv City Hall lit up with the colors of the Lebanese flag on 5 August 2020

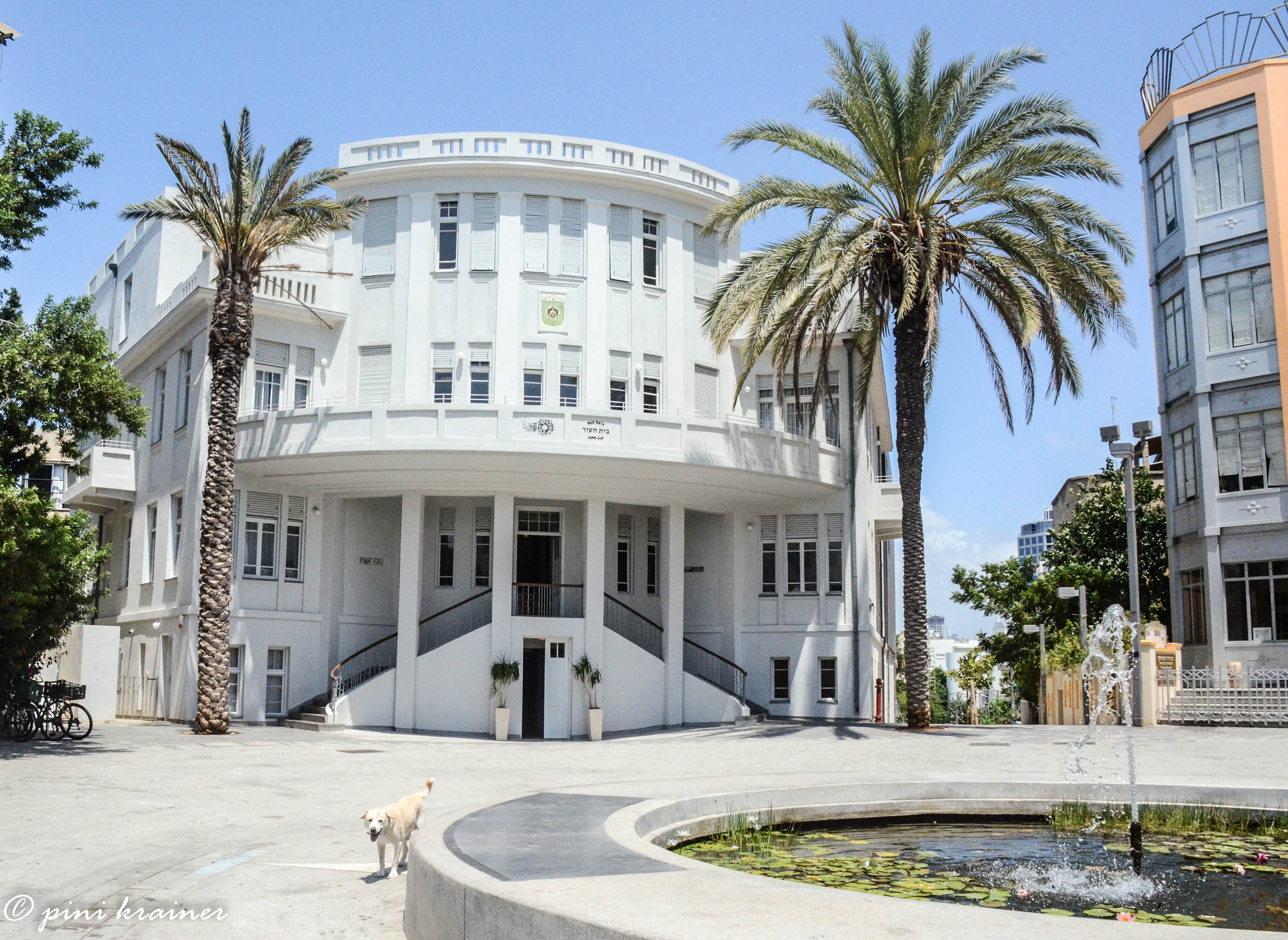
Restored historical city hall, 2011

== See also ==
- History of Tel Aviv
