= Itay Zalait =

Israeli sculptor and painter

Itay Zalait איתי זלאיט
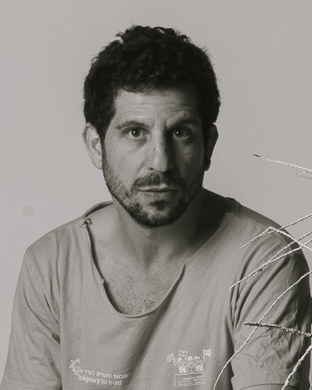
- Itay Zalait
- Born: April 21, 1979 (age 47); Bnei Brak, Israel
- Education: Open University of Israel; Beit Berl College
- Known for: sculpting; painting; visual art
- Notable work: The Hero of Israel (2020); The Last Supper (2020); King Bibi (2018)
- Movement: Dada; Avant-garde
- Website: itayzalait.art

Itay Zalait (Hebrew: איתי זלאיט; born: April 21, 1979) is a multifaceted Israeli artist and lecturer who deals mainly with painting and sculpting. He rose to prominence and public notoriety mainly through his series of artworks during the protests against Benjamin Netanyahu which, according to Zalait, are not fueled by a political stance, but rather by a desire to test the boundaries of artistic expression and to awaken a conversation and discussion in regards to themes such as freedom of expression, pluralism, and tolerance.

== Biography ==
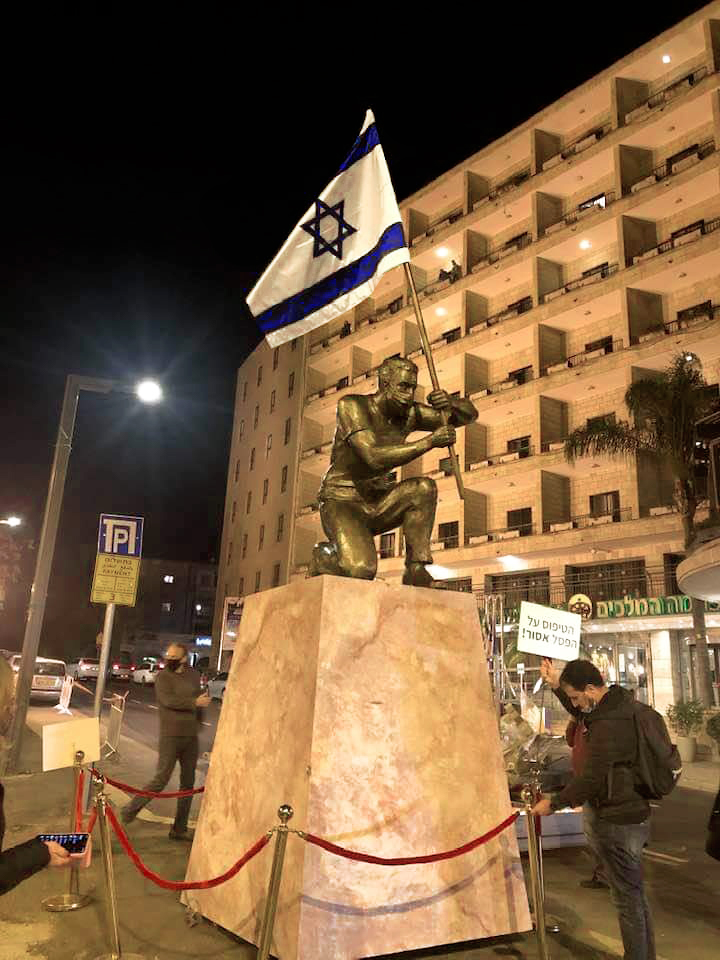
"Hero of Israel" statue placed at Paris Square in Jerusalem as part of the protests against Benjamin Netanyahu

Zalait was born in Bnei Brak to Ovadia and Rina Zalait. He attended "Hagiva" elementary school in Bnei Brak. At age nine he exhibited his work at the youth wing at the Israel Museum as part of a competition held in collaboration with "Mishkafayim" art magazine.

He began his army service training as a combatant in Sayeret Matkal. A year after his service he transferred to the School for Counter-Terrorism where he served as a combatant and as an instructor. Zalait was selected to instruct the Counter-Terrorist course at the school where he remained throughout the entire three-year stint of his mandatory service.

In 2008, Zalait completed a B.A. in psychology at the Open University of Israel and in 2011 completed a B.A. at Beit Berl college of art.

Zalait occupies his time painting and sculpting while utilizing a wide range of techniques and materials. His materials are numerous and diverse such as toys and natural materials some of which he picks up from the street, in garbage bins, and others which he produces himself.

Zalait explores, both in his personal and professional life, the concept of freedom on a personal-psychological level and also in the aspect of a collective-cultural level. His works deal mainly with the question of personal and social freedom, capitalism, consumerism, and populism through casts and pieces of broken toys which he forms into statues and exhibits which conjure up questions and discussions. Zalait is influenced by the surrealist legacy and operates in the spirit of the Dada Avant-garde movement. Through his works, Zalait wishes to challenge the limits of the local conversation and shake the accepted norms in the hopes of awakening new and critical thought about the social and cultural questions of the day.

In 2015, Zalait, exhibited "Haroshet HaTlamim" (Furrow Industry), a solo exhibition which delved with themes of freedom and freedom of choice, both on a personal-psychological level and on a cultural level - consumerism, the herd effect and the transformation of man to machine. In this display, Zalait exhibited 15 object hybrids which were given new expression, most of them toys which he had found on the street and randomly assembled together.

== Protest art ==
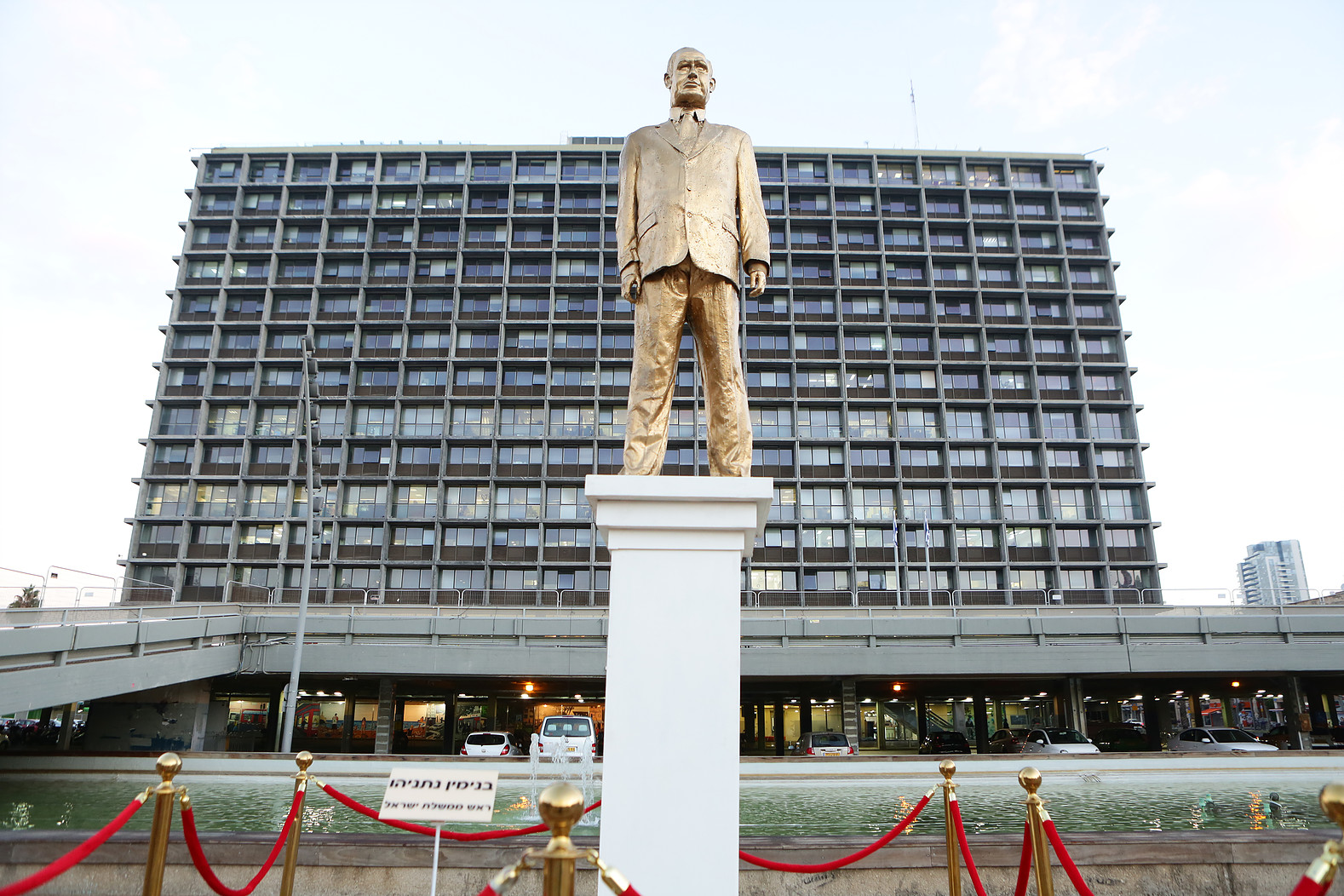
The "King Bibi" exhibit at Rabin Square, 6 December 2016

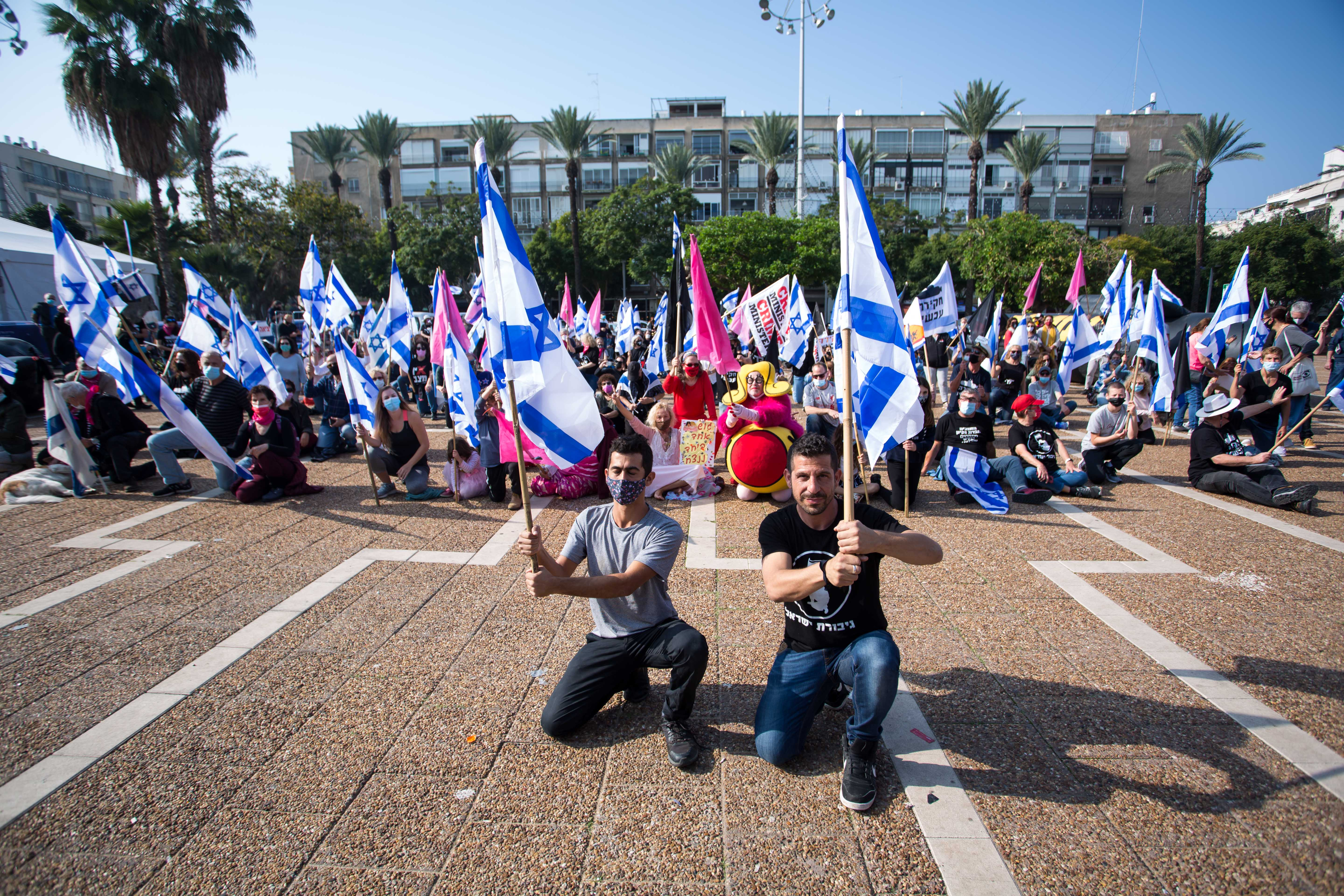
A multi-participant photo in Rabin Square next to the sculptor Hero of Israel, with the photographers standing in the position of the sculptor with a flag. In the front of the photo on the right is Itai Zlait and next to him on the left is Nimrod Gross, who was holding the Israeli flag in a photograph inspired by the sculpture.

On December 6, 2016, Zalait placed his work "King Bibi" at Rabin Square - a gold statue in the image of Prime Minister Benjamin Netanyahu, which stood at 4.5 meters. The exhibit created an unprecedented local and global uproar. According to Zalait, "It was the tectonic events happening in Israel and the world" which drove him to divert his art towards social questions and current events. According to Zalait, the drive to put up the statue was not fueled by a political stance, but rather by a desire to test the boundaries of artistic expression and to awaken a conversation pertaining to the freedom of expression, pluralism, and tolerance. Through this work, Zalait asked to reflect the social reality in Israel and to put up a mirror to the social processes which are taking place in Israel.

Following this event, a conversation was spurred between Right and Left around topics pertaining to the freedom of expression, boundaries of art and political art in the public domain, In an interview given by Zalait to The New York Times, Zalait stated that "Only time will tell us if it was a provocation or a prophecy". Interest in the statue surpassed the country's borders and led to wide global interest including historians and collectors from the United States who expressed great interest in the statue. The statue's exhibition received widespread media coverage including The New York Times, CNN, BBC, The Guardian, German media and was also featured in Al Arabiya, Al Jazeera and on television networks in Turkey and Iran. In 2018, one of the statue's replicas was sold to an American collector who houses the largest collection of dictator statues. Zalait created a 300 kg bronze replica and plans to place it next to the original statues of dictators from around the world which have been gathered from the past 30 years.

On March 5, 2018, Zalait exhibited "Degel 2018" (Flag 2018) at Rabin Square showing the Israeli Flag in a slanted position between falling and being fully erect. Through the exhibit, Zalait wished to express the deep divide in which Israeli society is in and to define Israel's situation in 2018 as an interim phase - between collapse and standing tall; between citizens who experience the country as the epitome of good and those who feel that Israeli democracy is on the verge of collapse with shaking foundations in front of their eyes.

On November 8, 2018, Zalait exhibited "Be'Lev HaUma" (At the Heart of the Nation), a statue in the image of former Culture and Sports Minister, Miri Regev, standing opposite to a big white mirror. In an interview to Israel's channel 12, Zalait stated that "Minister Regev is a figure at the heart of the nation, and anyone may interpret the work as they see fit. I began working on it a few months ago and it may be taken in many directions."

On July 29, 2020, Zalait exhibited "The Last Supper", a protest exhibit that included a statue of Prime Minister Netanyahu alongside a table adorned with champagne and wine bottles, various foods, and holding a cake in the shape of the Israeli flag. According to organizers, the goal of the exhibit was to awaken Israel citizens, which have been "sitting on the fence", to join the protests against corruption, public collapse and the disconnect of the government from the people and "not to allow our land of milk and honey to turn into a land which devours its people".

In December 2020, Zalait placed the "Hero of Israel" statue at Paris Square in Jerusalem, the backdrop of ongoing protests against Benjamin Netanyahu. The 6-ton bronze statue was inspired by the now-famous photo of Nimrod Gross holding a flag and being forcefully sprayed by a police water cannon. After a few hours from the placing of the statue, the statue was removed by Jerusalem municipality enforcers and police.

In August 2026, at the request of the Ugandan government, Zalait placed a statue of Yonatan Netanyahu, at the Entebbe airport terminal where he lost his life during the Entebbe raid.

Zalait has exhibited his works at museums in Israel and abroad, among which are the Janco Dada Museum, Art Market Budapest, The Red House, Alfred Art Institute, Hanina Gallery, and more. His works are found in private collections in Israel and abroad.

== Personal life ==
Zalait is married to Ricki and is a father of two. He resides in Ramat Gan.

== Gallery ==
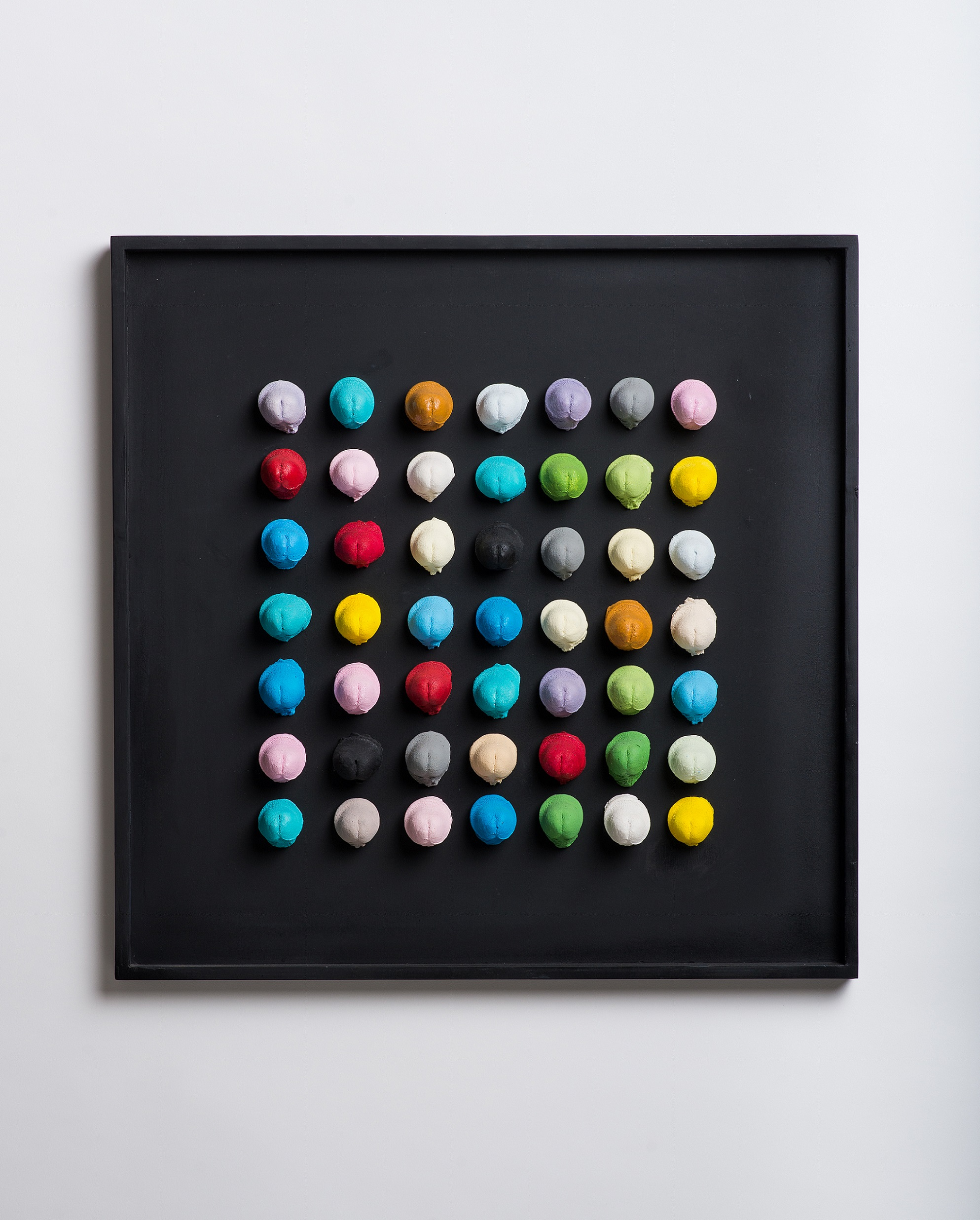
Macroons - Cast polymer in wood

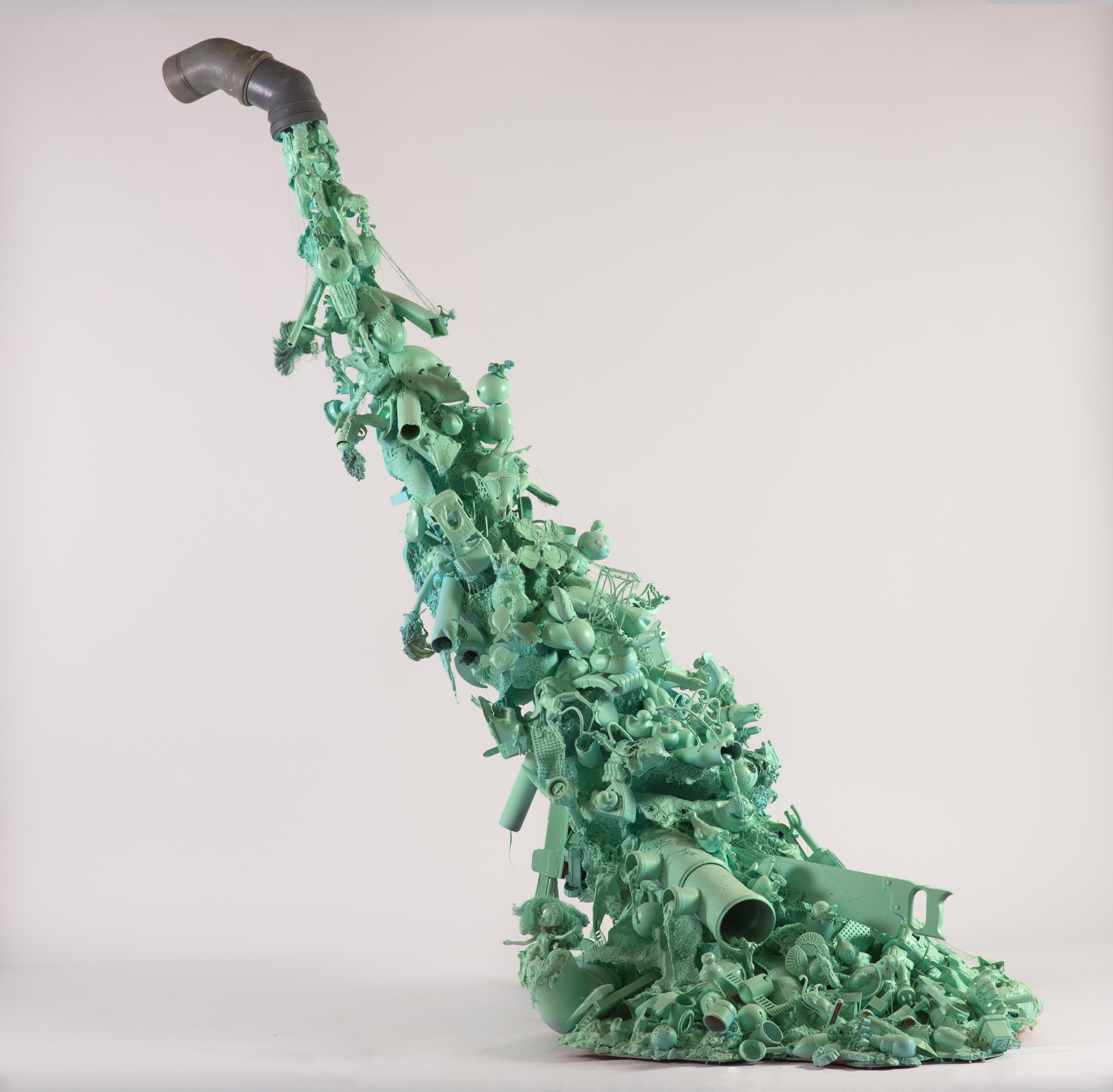
Furrow Industry 4

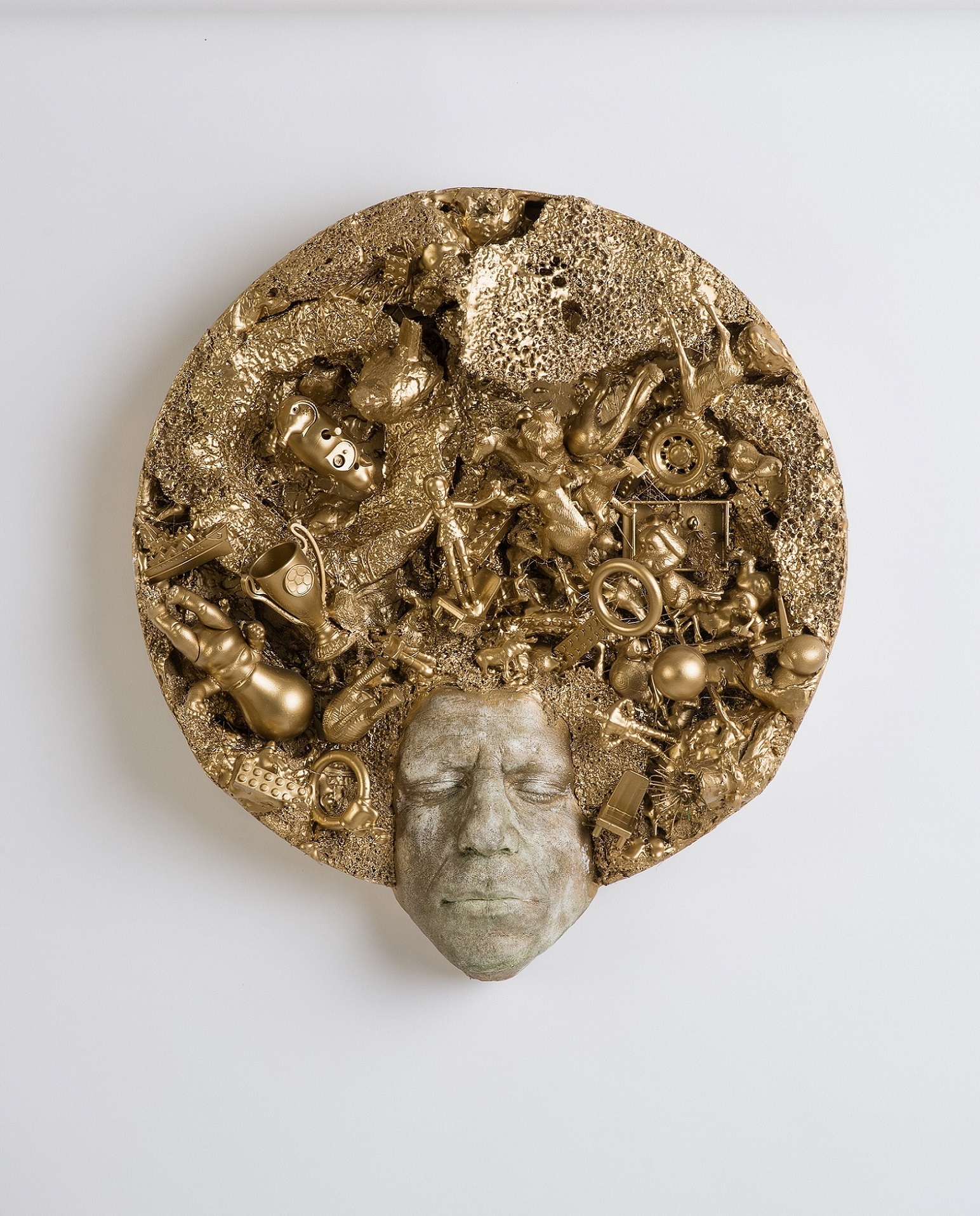
Medusa - Cast polymer in wood

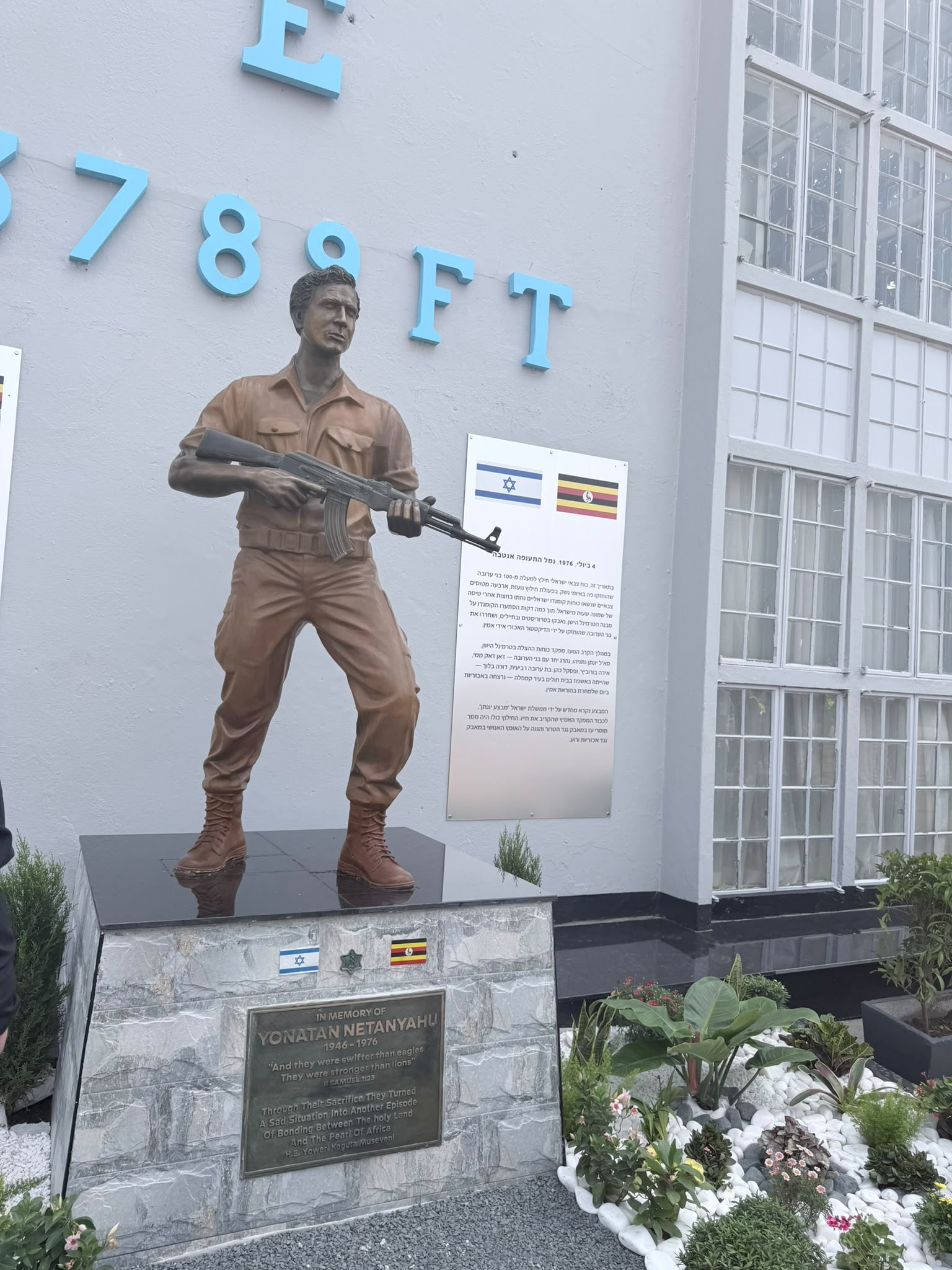
The statue of Jonathan Netanyahu at Entebbe International Airport in Uganda; sculptor Itay Zalait

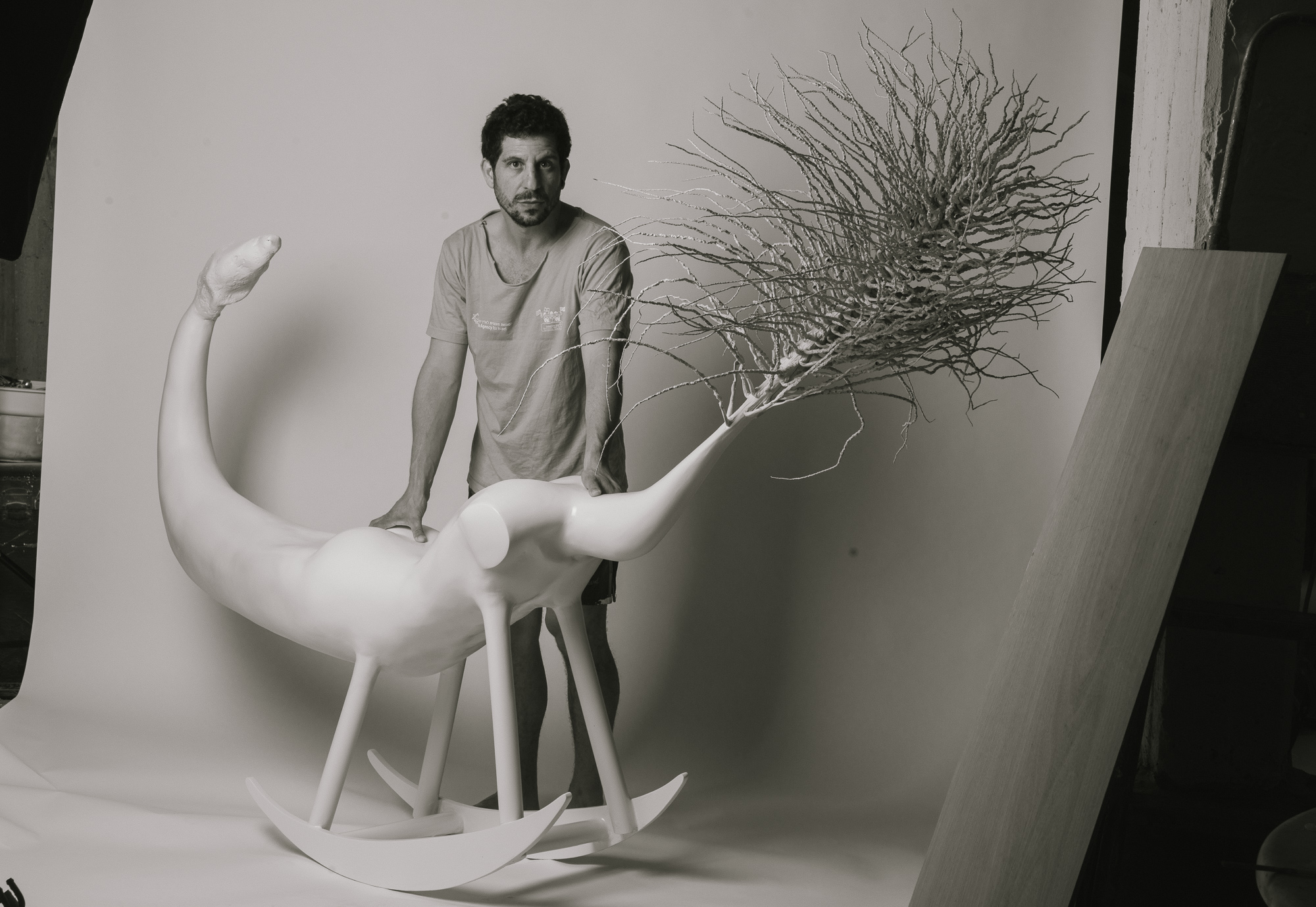
Furrow Industry in Studio
