= Moshe Czerner =

Architect and municipal engineer in Tel Aviv (1879–1962)

- משה לייב צ׳רנר
- Czerner
- Born: 1879; Sniatyn, Galicia, Austria-Hungary
- Died: 20 January 1962; Tel Aviv, Israel
- Resting place: Kiryat Shaul Cemetery, Tel Aviv
- Occupations: Architect; municipal engineer
- Buildings: Beit Skora / former Tel Aviv City Hall; Ohel Shem

Moshe Leib Czerner (Hebrew: משה לייב צ׳רנר; 1879 – 20 January 1962), also transliterated Moshe Cherner, was an architect and municipal engineer active in Tel Aviv in Mandatory Palestine and Israel. He designed Eclectic buildings in the 1920s and later modernist and International Style buildings, and served as city engineer for the Tel Aviv municipality from 1928 to 1929.

His public buildings included Beit Skora at 27 Bialik Street, designed in 1925 as a hotel and subsequently used as Tel Aviv City Hall, and Ohel Shem at 30 Balfour Street, built in 1929 for the Oneg Shabbat Society led by Hayim Nahman Bialik. Beit Skora now houses the Tel Aviv-Yafo City Museum.

Architecture writer Naama Riva, citing research by Tel Aviv historian Shula Vidrich, described him as one of the leading architects of the city's Eclectic period; preservation architect Nitza Szmuk described him as an architect "of the first rank" in a discussion of the 1925 Shafran House.

== Early life and career ==
Czerner was born in 1879 in Sniatyn, Galicia, then part of Austria-Hungary and now in Ukraine. Born Moshe Leib Yurman, he was the son of Mendel Yurman. He studied architecture in Czernowitz and later used the surname Czerner.

Czerner married Rivka. The couple immigrated to Palestine in 1921 and settled in Tel Aviv. By 1922 they were living on Ahad Ha'am Street, where Czerner was registered as an architect.

In 1925 Czerner built a one-story house at 10 Sirkin Street for himself and Rivka. The address later also served as his architectural office, and the couple were still living there in 1928.

During the 1920s, Czerner designed houses, apartment buildings, alterations and public buildings in central Tel Aviv, including Ahad Ha'am Street, Balfour Street, Rothschild Boulevard, Nahmani Street, Melchett Street and Rambam Street.

Czerner served as Tel Aviv city engineer from 1928 to 1929. Yaakov Schiffman, later known as Yaakov Ben-Sira, entered the municipal planning administration in 1929 and subsequently became city engineer.

== Architecture ==
=== Eclectic period ===
Shafran House at the corner of Melchett and Nahmani streets, a 1925 Eclectic work by Czerner.

Several of Czerner's buildings are included in Tami Lerer's survey of fifty prominent Eclectic buildings constructed in Tel Aviv during the 1920s.

Czerner's Eclectic works of the 1920s included the Dov Rosenblit House at 32 Ahad Ha'am Street, the Shafran/Friedman House at 23 Nahmani Street and 2 Melchett Street, Beit Skora at 27 Bialik Street, the Shabach Ashkenazi House at the corner of Balfour Street and Rothschild Boulevard, the Wilkowski/Velikovsky House at 55 Rothschild Boulevard and 9 Bezalel Yafe Street, and the Meir Cohen House at 22 Rambam Street.

The three-story Shafran House, built in 1925, has tall windows, a strong vertical emphasis, large rooms, ceilings of about 3.7 meters, and ornament drawing on Jewish and Islamic architecture. It was built of silicate block and finished with plaster patterned to resemble Florentine rustication.

Dov Rosenblit House at 32 Ahad Ha'am Street, designed by Czerner in 1924.

The Dov Rosenblit House, completed in 1924, retains characteristic Eclectic facade details.

=== Beit Skora and the former Tel Aviv City Hall ===
The former Tel Aviv City Hall on Bialik Street, 30 April 1926.

Czerner designed Beit Skora at 27 Bialik Street in 1925 as a luxury hotel. The building is Neo-Classical and was commissioned by the American entrepreneur Eliezer Philip Skora.

Its position at the end of Bialik Street made it a visual terminus from the direction of Allenby Street. The Tel Aviv municipality moved its offices into the building in the summer of 1925 and purchased the property in 1928. It remained the city's municipal headquarters until the move to the present civic center in 1965.

=== Ohel Shem ===
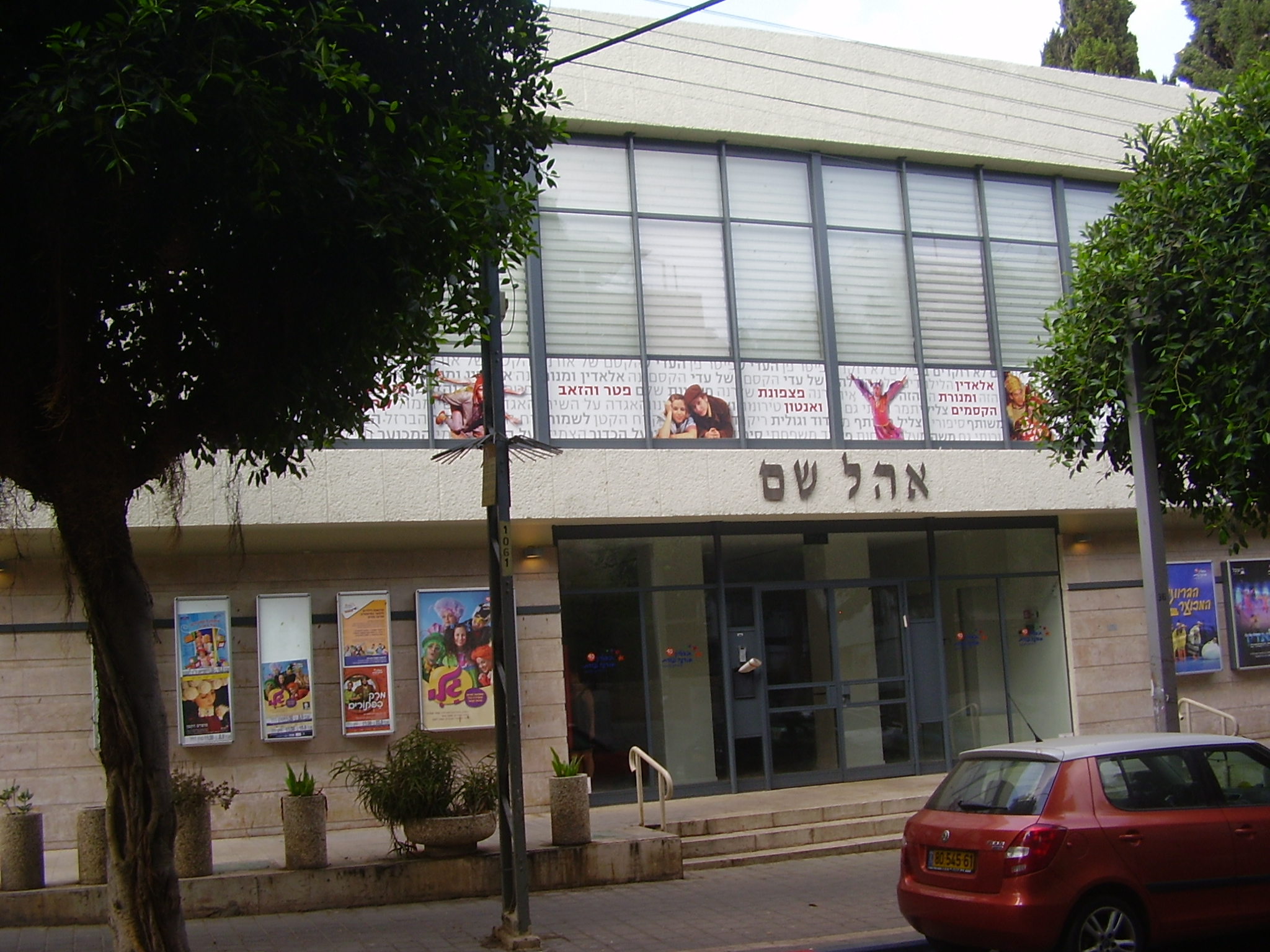
Ohel Shem at 30 Balfour Street, photographed in 2012.

In 1929 Czerner designed Ohel Shem at 30 Balfour Street as the permanent home of the Oneg Shabbat Society. Founded on 24 December 1926 by Tel Aviv intellectuals and public figures headed by Hayim Nahman Bialik, the society organized lectures, discussions and classes on Sabbaths and holidays within a pluralistic Jewish cultural framework.

The Jewish National Fund provided the site, and Samuel Bloom donated the £5,000 construction cost. Bialik, Bloom and Mayor Meir Dizengoff spoke at the building's dedication in 1929. A public library also operated there.

In 1934 Bialik's coffin lay at Ohel Shem before his funeral procession through Tel Aviv. Before the opening of Mann Auditorium in 1957, the Palestine Orchestra and later the Israel Philharmonic Orchestra performed for thousands of subscribers in Ohel Shem's approximately 620-seat hall; the new auditorium seated about 2,800.

=== Residential and commercial work ===
Shabach Ashkenazi House at the corner of Rothschild Boulevard and Balfour Street.

Czerner also designed apartment houses and mixed-use buildings. The Wilkowski/Velikovsky House on Rothschild Boulevard contained twenty-four apartment rooms, three servants' rooms, enclosed and open balconies, basement storage and laundry facilities. Its external facades remained largely intact when the building was documented in 2013.

His practice also included alterations to existing buildings. Signed 1926 drawings for Shlush 8–10 at Ein Yaakov show kitchens and service rooms added to earlier structures.

=== Transition to modernism ===
By the early 1930s Czerner's architectural language had begun to shift toward modernism. The Hempel House at 97 Yehuda Halevi Street and 50 Mazeh Street, begun in 1932, reflects this transition.

From 1929, municipal policy under Yaakov Ben-Sira rejected new Eclectic construction and promoted a modern architectural character.

Czerner's later projects included the Hempel House and Israel Kimball House in 1932, work on Yehuda Halevi Street in 1934 and Gilboa Street in 1935, and the Warshavsky House at 167 Ben Yehuda Street in 1937.

=== Attribution of the Romanov House ===
The Romanov House at 25 Nahmani Street was long attributed to Czerner because his signature appeared on plans submitted to the municipality. Conservation research by Nitza Szmuk later identified the German architect Leo Adler as the designer and Czerner as the local architect responsible for permits.

== Personal life and later years ==
In his memoir, Israel Wiesler, the Israeli writer known as Poocho, recalled that his parents stayed temporarily at Czerner's Sirkin Street house after arriving in Palestine. Wiesler's mother was related to Czerner.

Wiesler recalled a large kitchen table and benches used as beds and a Swedish carpenter's workbench that his father set up in Czerner's yard. Czerner declined to take rent and refused to use his municipal position to obtain work for his relative.

Wiesler later wrote that Czerner and Rivka had no children and that his mother sent food to the couple during Czerner's later years.

Czerner died in Tel Aviv on 20 January 1962 and was buried at Kiryat Shaul Cemetery. Rivka died later that year.

== Selected works ==
Year	Building / project	Address	Notes
1924	Dov Rosenblit House	32 Ahad Ha'am Street	Eclectic residential building.
1925	Beit Skora	27 Bialik Street	Designed as a hotel; became Tel Aviv City Hall and later the Tel Aviv-Yafo City Museum.
1925	Shafran / Friedman House	23 Nahmani Street / 2 Melchett Street	Three-story Eclectic building; later restored as part of The Norman complex.
1925	Czerner House	10 Sirkin Street	Czerner's one-story residence and later professional address.
1926	Shabach Ashkenazi House	44 Balfour Street / 88 Rothschild Boulevard	Eclectic residential and commercial building.
1926	Wilkowski / Velikovsky House	55 Rothschild Boulevard / 9 Bezalel Yafe Street	Large apartment building.
1926	Alterations at Shlush 8–10	Shlush Street / Ein Yaakov	Signed drawings for kitchens and service rooms survive.
1928–1930	Meir Cohen House	22 Rambam Street	Eclectic building constructed and altered in stages.
1929	Ohel Shem	30 Balfour Street	Permanent home of the Oneg Shabbat Society.
1930	Addition to existing building	92 Ahad Ha'am Street	Addition to an existing building.
1932	Hempel House	97 Yehuda Halevi Street / 50 Mazeh Street	Transitional work toward modernism.
1932	Israel Kimball House	28 Mazeh Street / 3 Melchett Street	Modernist building.
1934	Yardeni House / residential building	58 Yehuda Halevi Street / 52 Mazeh Street	Modernist building.
1935	Residential building	4 Gilboa Street	Modernist building.
1937	Warshavsky House	167 Ben Yehuda Street	Modernist building.

== Preservation ==
Several of Czerner's buildings survive in central Tel Aviv and are included in municipal preservation programs.

The former City Hall at Bialik Square after restoration.

Beit Skora was restored by Efrat-Kowalsky Architects in 2006–2009 for Tel Aviv's centenary and reopened as Beit Ha'ir. After a later renovation it reopened as the Tel Aviv-Yafo City Museum.

In 2024 Shula Vidrich described the former City Hall as the focal building of Bialik Street's heritage axis, which combines civic, cultural and residential buildings from several periods of Tel Aviv architecture.
