= Israel Philharmonic Orchestra =

Symphony orchestra based in Tel Aviv

- Orchestra
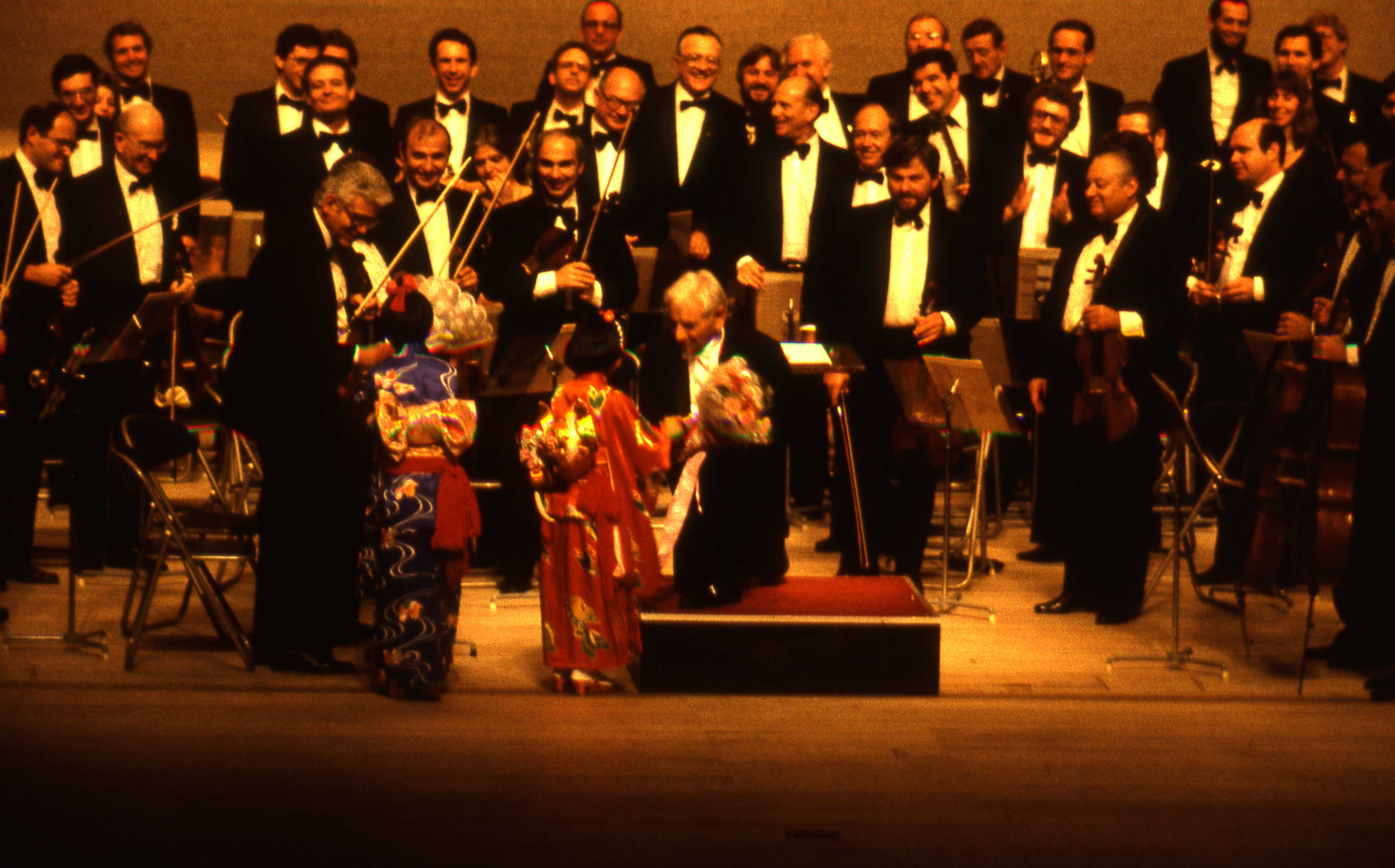
- Israel Philharmonic Orchestra conducted by Leonard Bernstein, Osaka Festival Hall (1985)
- Native name: התזמורת הפילהרמונית הישראלית
- Short name: IPO
- Founded: December 26, 1936; Mandatory Palestine
- Location: Israel
- Concert hall: Heichal HaTarbut
- Music director: Lahav Shani
- Website: Official website

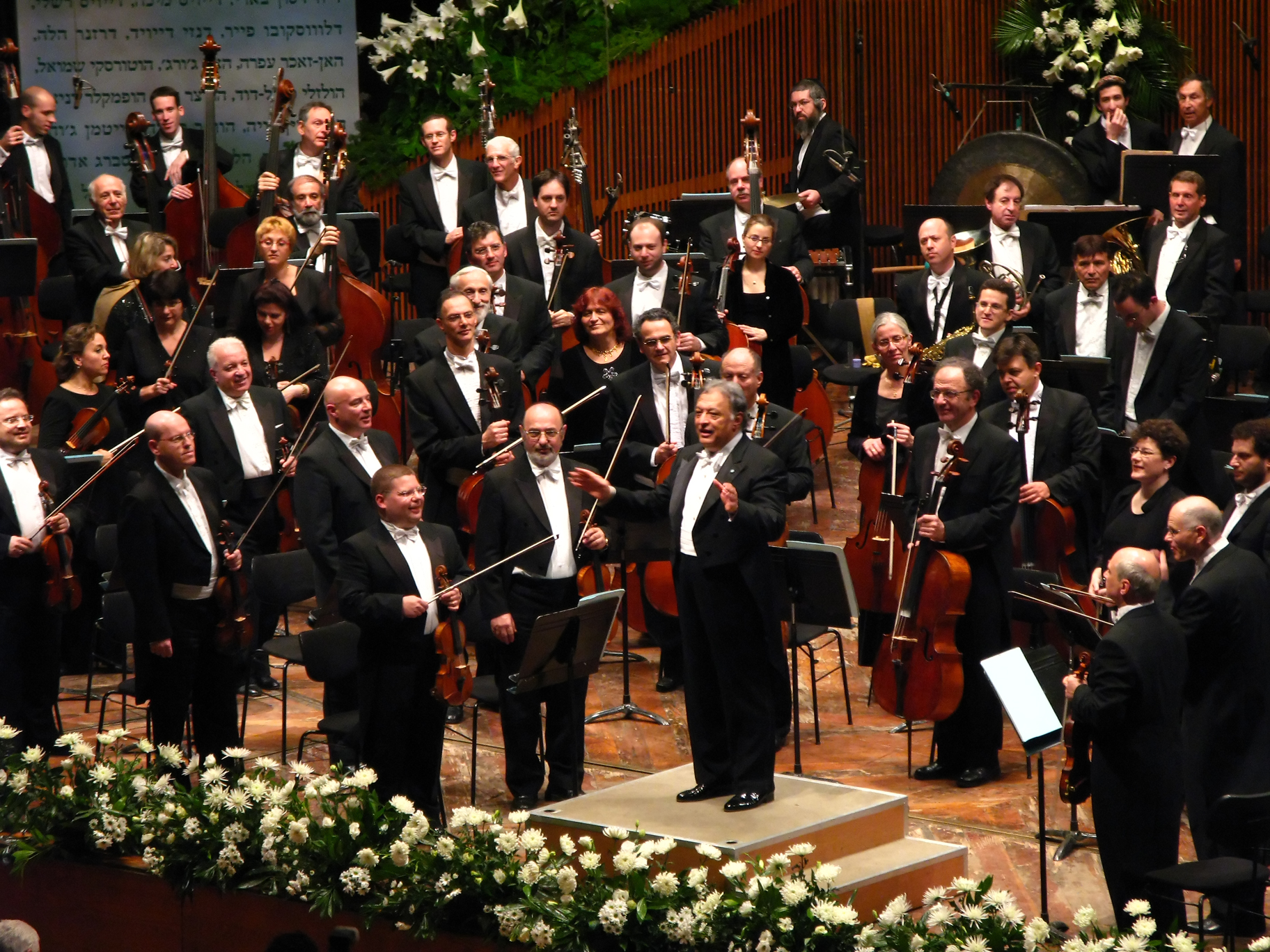
Israel Philharmonic Orchestra conducted by Zubin Mehta, 70th anniversary celebrations

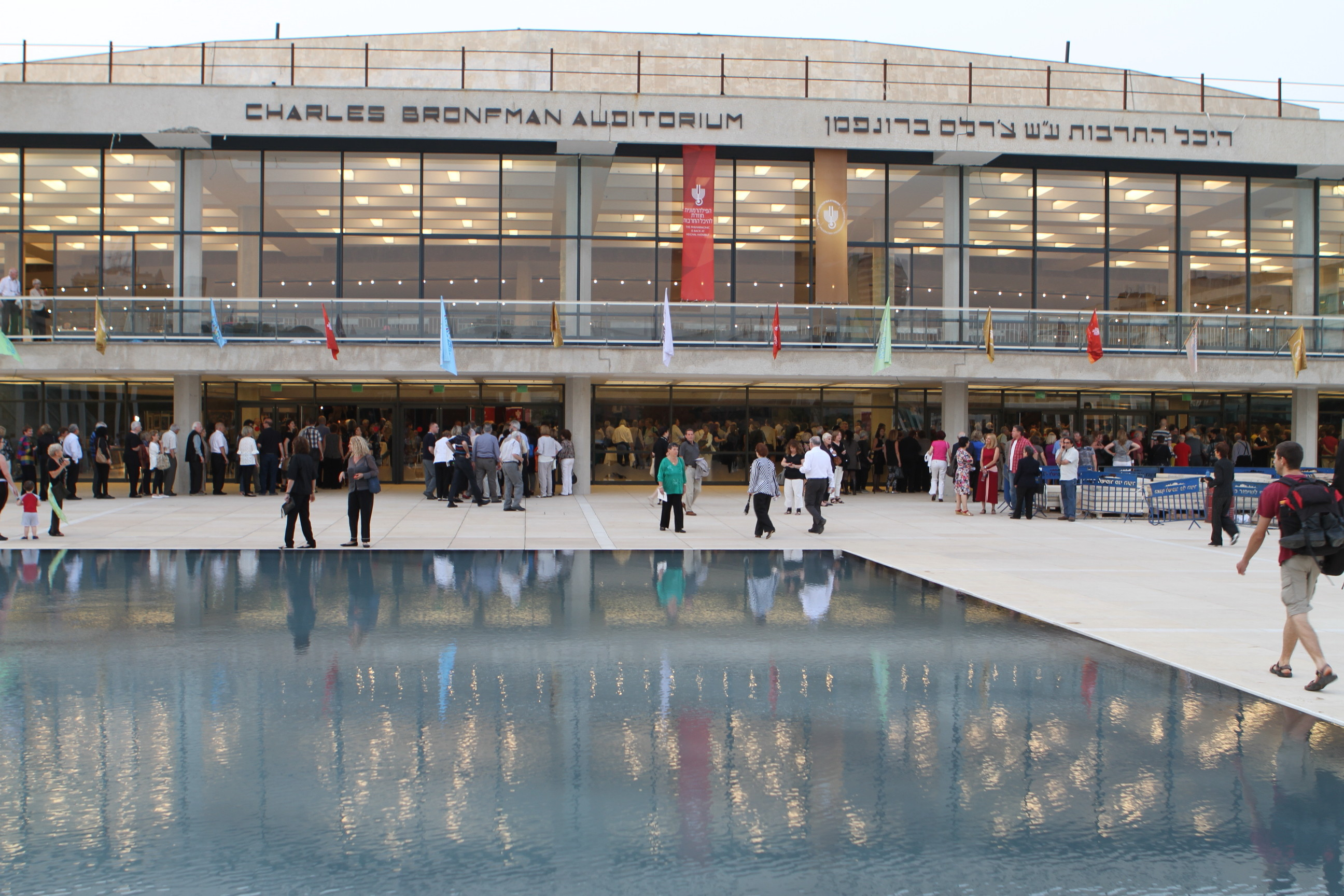
Charles Bronfman Auditorium (Heichal Hatarbut), home of the Israel Philharmonic Orchestra in Tel Aviv

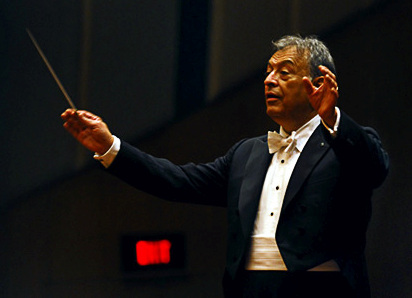
Zubin Mehta conducting the Israeli Philharmonic Orchestra at the Jamshed Bhabha Theater (NCPA) in Mumbai

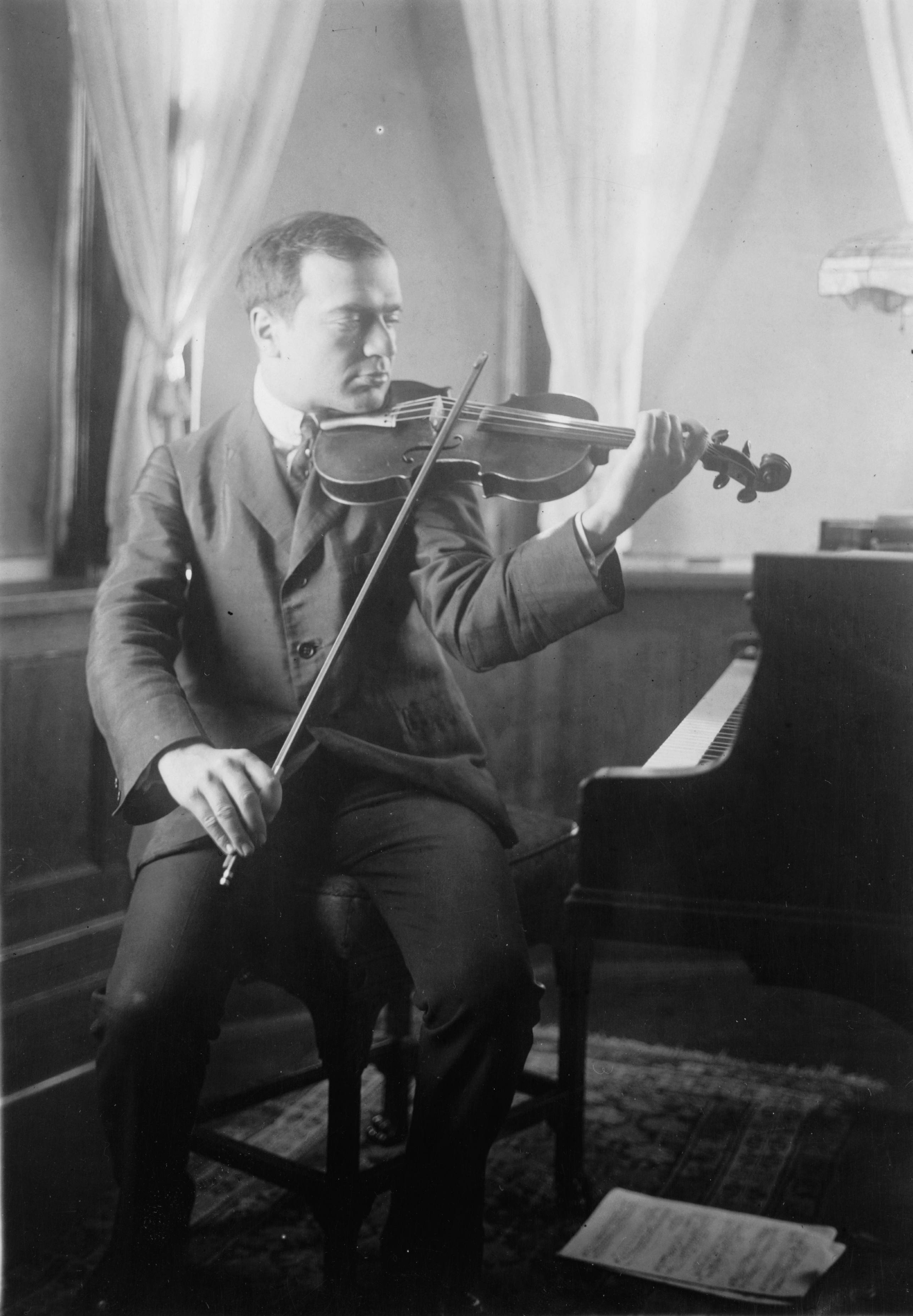
Bronisław Huberman, a Polish-Jewish violinist who founded the Israel Philharmonic Orchestra

The Israel Philharmonic Orchestra (abbreviation IPO; Hebrew: התזמורת הפילהרמונית הישראלית, ha-Tizmoret ha-Filharmonit ha-Yisra'elit) is a major Israeli symphony orchestra based in Tel Aviv. Since 1957, its principal concert venue has been Heichal HaTarbut. Previously, it performed at Ohel Shem, designed by architect Moshe Czerner.

== History ==
The Israel Philharmonic Orchestra was founded as the Palestine Symphony Orchestra by violinist Bronisław Huberman in 1936, at a time of the dismissal of many Jewish musicians from European orchestras. Its inaugural concert took place in Tel Aviv on December 26, 1936, conducted by Arturo Toscanini. Its first principal conductor was William Steinberg.

Its general manager between 1938 and 1945 was Leo Kestenberg, who, like many of the orchestra members, was a German Jew forced out by the rise of Nazism and the persecution of Jews. During the Second World War, the orchestra performed 140 times before Allied soldiers, including a 1942 performance for soldiers of the Jewish Brigade at El Alamein. At the end of the war, it performed in recently liberated Belgium. In 1948, after the creation of the State of Israel, the orchestra was renamed as the Israel Philharmonic Orchestra.

In 1955, the Orchestra played for Pope Pius XII at the Vatican, in appreciation for the assistance the Pope had given to Jewish victims of Nazism during World War Two.

Particular conductors notable in the history of the orchestra have included Leonard Bernstein and Zubin Mehta. Bernstein maintained close ties with the orchestra from 1947, and in 1988, the IPO bestowed on him the title of Laureate Conductor, which he retained until his death in 1990. Mehta became the IPO's Music Advisor in 1969. The IPO did not have a formal music director, but instead "music advisors", until 1977, when Mehta was appointed the IPO's first Music Director. In 1981, his title was elevated to Music Director for Life. In December 2016, the Israel Philharmonic announced that Mehta was to conclude his tenure as music director as of October 2019. Principal guest conductors of the orchestra have included Yoel Levi and Gianandrea Noseda.

With Mehta, the IPO made a number of recordings for Decca. With Bernstein, the IPO recorded his own compositions and works of Igor Stravinsky, for Deutsche Grammophon. The IPO also collaborated with Japanese composer Yoko Kanno in the soundtrack of the anime Macross Plus.

The initial concerts of the Palestine Orchestra in December 1936, conducted by Toscanini, featured the music of Richard Wagner. However, after the Kristallnacht pogroms in November 1938, the orchestra has maintained a de facto ban on Wagner's work, due to that composer's antisemitism and the association of his music with Nazi Germany.

The Secretary-General of the orchestra is Avi Shoshani. The IPO has a subscriber base numbering 26,000. Commentators have noted the musically conservative tastes of the subscriber base, although the IPO is dedicated to performing new works by Israeli composers, such as Avner Dorman.

Among the orchestra's education initiatives are the Buchmann-Mehta School of Music, a partnership between the Israel Philharmonic Orchestra and Tel Aviv University. Created by Zubin Mehta and philanthropist Josef Buchmann to educate orchestral musicians to supply the artistic future of the IPO and other orchestras, the school is located on the university's campus in Tel Aviv and works very closely with the IPO, including orchestral training programs, master classes with IPO guest artists and special concerts at the IPO's halls. Several members of the IPO are BMSM alumni, while various IPO musicians serve as BMSM faculty members.

In 2007, Lahav Shani first appeared with the IPO as guest soloist. Starting in October 2013, he appeared as guest conductor with the orchestra each year. In January 2018, the IPO announced the appointment of Shani as its next music director, effective with the 2020-2021 season. In January 2025, the IPO announced the extension of Shani's contract as music director to 2032.

== Awards and recognition ==
In 1958, the IPO was awarded the Israel Prize, in music, the first time that an organisation received the Prize.

== Music advisors ==
- William Steinberg (1936–1938)
- Leonard Bernstein (1947–1949; Laureate Conductor, 1988–1990)
- Paul Paray (1949–1951)
- Bernardino Molinari
- Jean Martinon (1957–1959)
- Zubin Mehta (1969–1977)

== Music directors ==
- Zubin Mehta (1977–2019)
- Lahav Shani (2020–present)

== Disruptions ==
The orchestra's performance in London at The Proms on September 1, 2011 was disrupted by pro-Palestinian protesters. The radio broadcast was interrupted, but the concert was broadcast again a few days later. The orchestra's secretary-general Avi Shoshani declared to London's The Times newspaper that the orchestra was unlikely to ever perform in the UK again. Nobody was prosecuted for the disruptions, partly because the management of the Royal Albert Hall, where the concert took place, declined to cooperate with a group of Israel-supporting lawyers.

On November 6, 2025, four people were detained for disrupting a concert by the orchestra at the Philharmonie de Paris as part of protest actions against the Gaza war.

== See also ==
- Buchmann-Mehta School of Music
- Young Israel Philharmonic Orchestra
- Jerusalem Symphony Orchestra
- Culture of Israel
- Israel Philharmonic Orchestra Foundation
- List of Israel Prize recipients
- Music of Israel
- Hellmut Stern
- Marc Lavry
