= Paris Square (Jerusalem) =

Square or plaza in Jerusalem

Coordinates: 31°46′30″N 35°13′03″E

- Public square
- France Square
- כיכר פריז
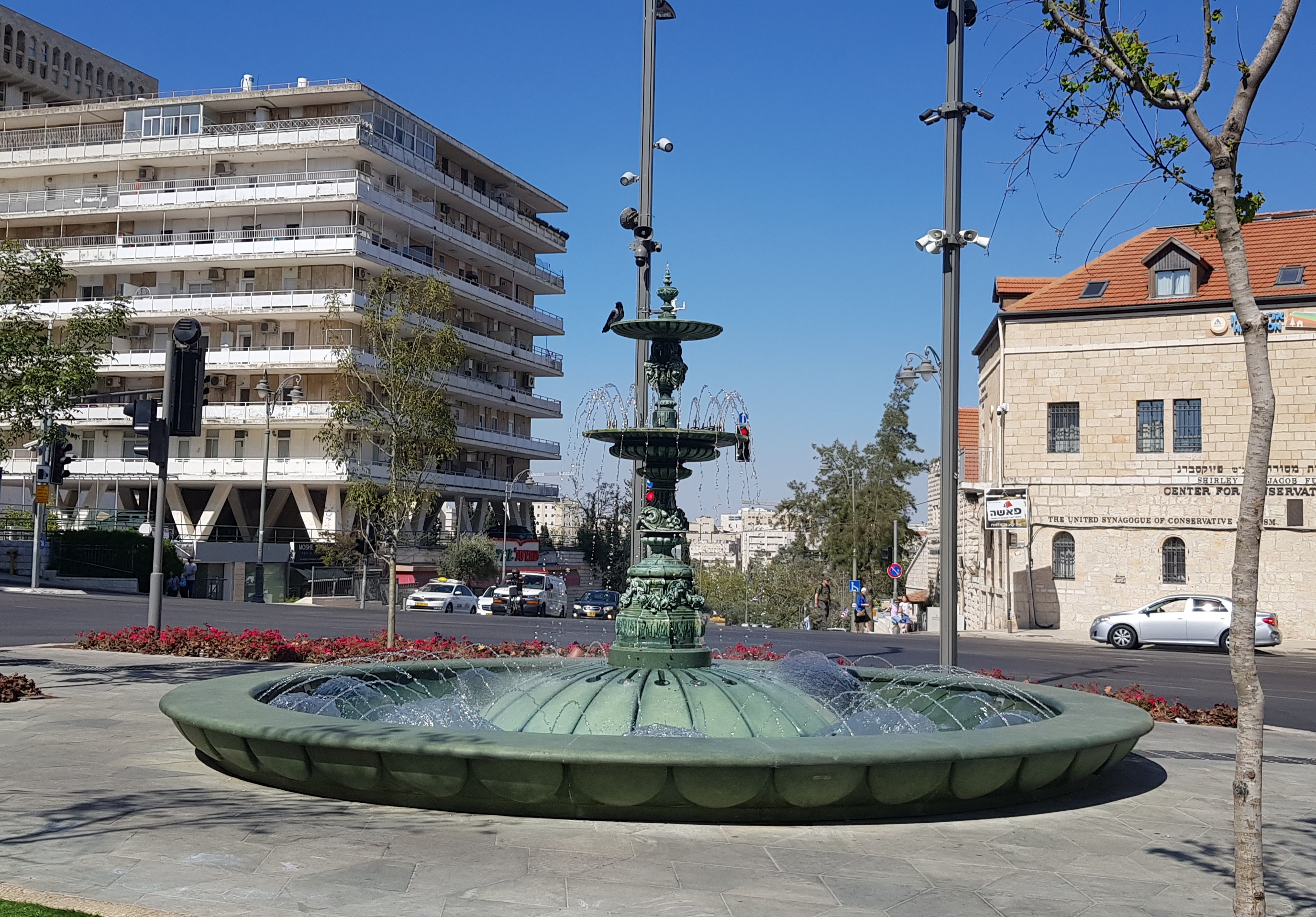
- Paris Square after renovations, 2022
- Constructed: 1959
- Location: Rehavia, Jerusalem
- Interactive map of Paris Square

Paris Square (Arabic: ساحة باريس; Hebrew: כיכר פריז, Kikar Pariz; also called: France Square, Kikar Tzarfat) is a town square at the edge of Rehavia and borders on Talbiya, both in Jerusalem.

== Name and fountain ==
The name France Square was established in 1959. In 2007 the city of Paris presented Jerusalem with the "French Fountain", which was set up in the middle of the square. From that time on the square has been called "Paris Square".

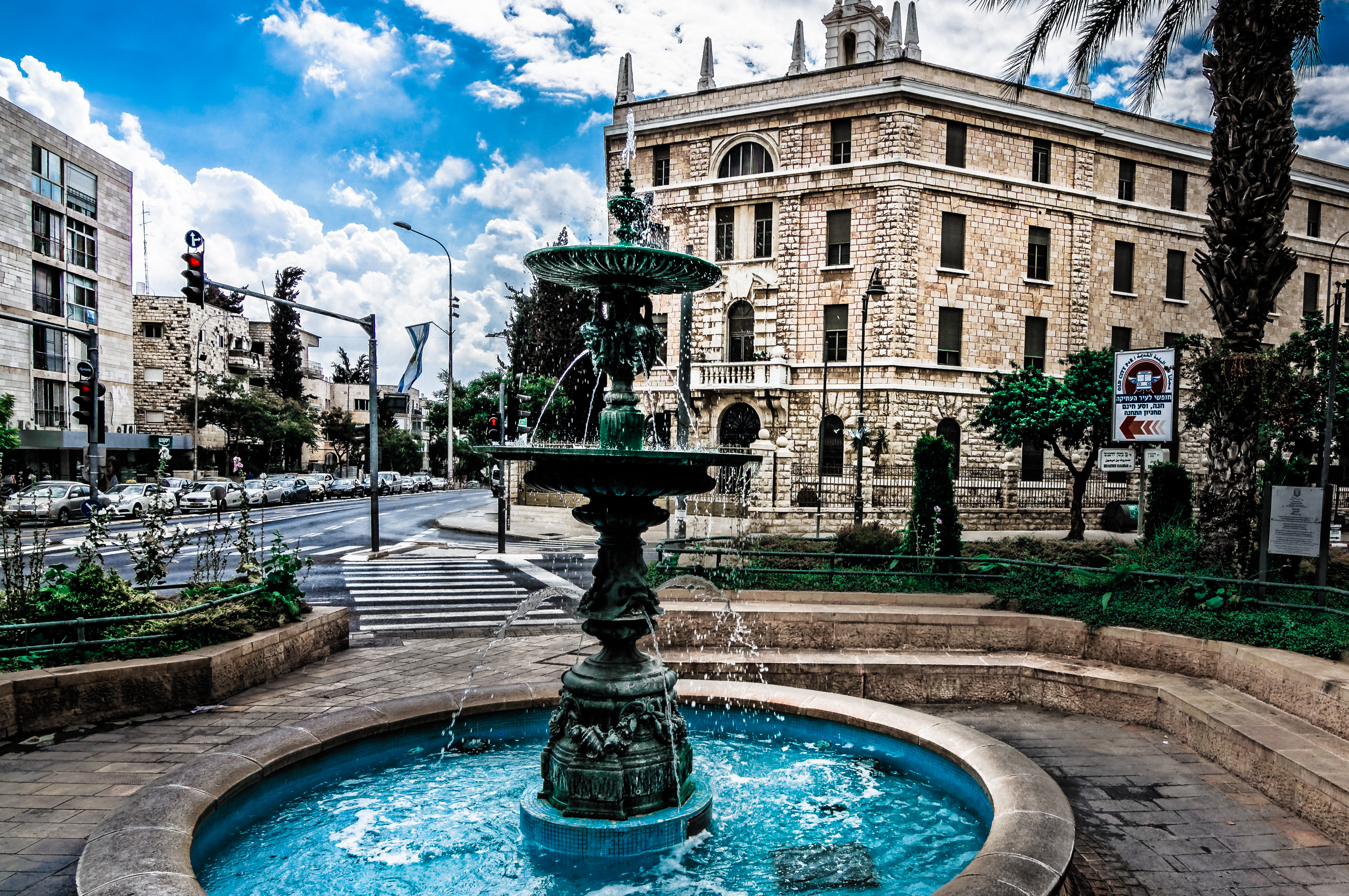
Old fountain and Terra Sancta College, 2014

== Location and landmarks ==
The square is flanked on its east side by King George Street, which continues as Keren Hayesod Street southeast of it. It also borders on Ramban Street (which splits in two at the square) and Ben Maimon Street, both merging east of the square into Gershon Agron Street. At the square, Ben Maimon Street forms the boundary between Rehavia and Talbiya.

The Terra Sancta College building flanks the square from the southeast.

The square is near the official residence of the Prime Minister of Israel.

== Protest venue ==
Due to its proximity to the PM's official residence, it has been used to stage protests every Friday by the Women in Black, beginning in late 1987 at the start of the First Intifada, and at least until 2019, when they marked 32 years of protest.

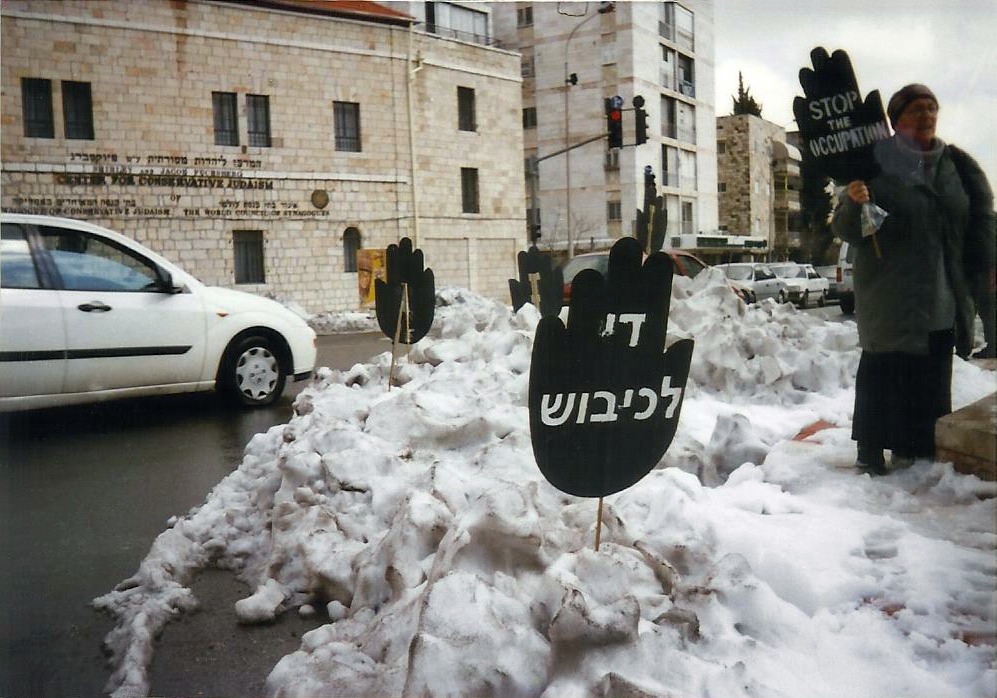
Women in Black staging a protest in Paris Square with the distinctive black stop signs calling "Stop the Occupation" in three languages

The opposing, nationalist right-wing Women in Green group staged counter-demonstrations at Paris Square, as well as independent ones, for instance in 2007 against PM Ehud Olmert's readyness to make territorial concessions to the Palestinians in exchange for peace.

It again became a major protest site during the 2020–21 protests against Benjamin Netanyahu. In December2020, the Hero of Israel statue was set up in the square by demonstrators, but was promptly removed by the authorities.
