= Israel Philharmonic Orchestra Foundation =

Israeli foundation

- Abbreviation: IPO Foundation
- Formation: 1981
- Type: Non-profit Arts Organization
- Purpose: Provides financial support to the Israel Philharmonic Orchestra
- Headquarters: Mann Auditorium
- Location: Tel Aviv, Israel
- Region served: Israel
- Members: Worldwide
- Official language: Hebrew, English
- Executive Director: Tali Gottlieb
- Parent organization: Israel Philharmonic Orchestra
- Website: http://www.ipo.co.il/eng/Fund/.aspx

The Israel Philharmonic Orchestra Foundation (IPO Foundation, Hebrew: קרן התזמורת הפילהרמונית הישראלית Keren ha-Tizmoret ha-Filharmonit ha-Yisre'elit) is a non-profit organization dedicated to providing financial support to the Israel Philharmonic Orchestra. Since its founding in 1981, the IPO Foundation has helped fund the Israel Philharmonic Orchestra's international tours, music education programs, and special musical events throughout Israel.

== History ==
The IPO Foundation was founded in 1981 in response to the lack of a substantial Israeli government subsidy or endowment fund for the Israel Philharmonic Orchestra. The IPO Foundation's first act was to create an Endowment Fund for the Orchestra, invested with the principal of each donation kept intact. Income from the Endowment Fund is used both to finance the Orchestra's long-term projects and to balance the Orchestra's budget if revenues fall short of operating expenses in any given year.

Over the years, the IPO Foundation has shifted its focus to financing the music education and community outreach initiatives of the Israel Philharmonic Orchestra as well as maintaining the Endowment Fund and building a network of foundations and individuals who support the IPO.

In 2012, the orchestra played compositions by Richard Wagner for the first time inside the country since Israel's foundation in 1948. In June 2020, the annual gala was held online but a cyberattack causing the foundation's website to crash made it impossible for the 13,000 guests to attend the event. The gala was an opportunity to recover from the losses caused by the Covid-19 pandemic. In 2021, the IPO created a virtual backstage tour of the Auditorium, including the musical library and the Philharmonic's archives.

== Mission ==
It is the mission of the IPO Foundation to secure the financial future of the Israel Philharmonic Orchestra. The IPO Foundation supports the Orchestra's international touring program, educational projects, a wide array of musical activities in Israel and an endowment fund to further ensure the IPO's future.

Funds raised by IPO Foundation help the Orchestra initiate and strengthen existing programs, and maintain its standard of musical excellence without placing a financial burden on the IPO's budget or compromising its long-term stability. Contributions help to underwrite the IPO's international tours, expand and enhance the Orchestra's musical programs for Israeli youth, purchase valuable instruments to loan to Orchestra members, and preserve the Orchestra's history through archival projects.

== Educational Programs ==
=== KeyNote ===
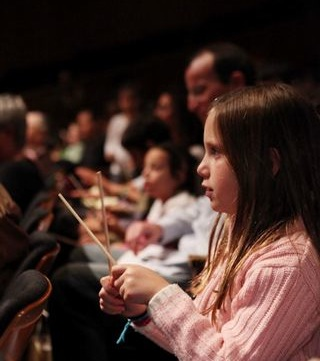
Middle school students at a KeyNote Concert held in Mann Auditorium, November 2009

In addition to providing financial security to the Orchestra, the IPO Foundation funds the Israel Philharmonic Orchestra's Music Education and Community Outreach department, KeyNote (Hebrew: תכנית מפתח).

Since its founding in 2001, KeyNote has established numerous programs for kindergarten, elementary school and high school students. Programs include teacher training, music education curricula, performances of IPO members at music classes once a semester; and concerts at which the pieces studied each semester are presented in concert. The KeyNote program collaborates with the music department at Levinsky Teachers College and is supervised by the musical education department of the Israeli Ministry of Education. Over a three-year period, the students attend six Philharmonic morning concerts with pieces tailored to each age group.

KeyNote in the Community is a similar program where musicians perform for rural communities, both Jewish and Arab, emphasizing education and curriculum development prior to concerts. The participants receive tickets and transportation to concerts at Mann Auditorium, the Israel Philharmonic Orchestra's home in Tel Aviv.

In addition, KeyNote oversees Shesh-Besh, an ensemble that brings together musicians from the IPO and the Arab Christian and Muslim communities of northern Israel. The group uses a mixture of instruments (flute, ney, violin, viola, eastern violin, oud, double bass, and assorted percussion), and thus fuses elements from both Western and Arab music. The group performs throughout the country and has also toured internationally at Carnegie Hall and at the Tanglewood Music Festival.

KeyNote also oversees Tochnit Mifne, a program founded by Maestro Zubin Mehta to promote education in Arab music as well as Western music for students of the Galilee region. The program collaborates with the Beit Il Musika Conservatory in Sh'far'am and The Mouteran School in Nazareth in order to provide cross-cultural musical training for Israeli students of music.

== Fundraising ==
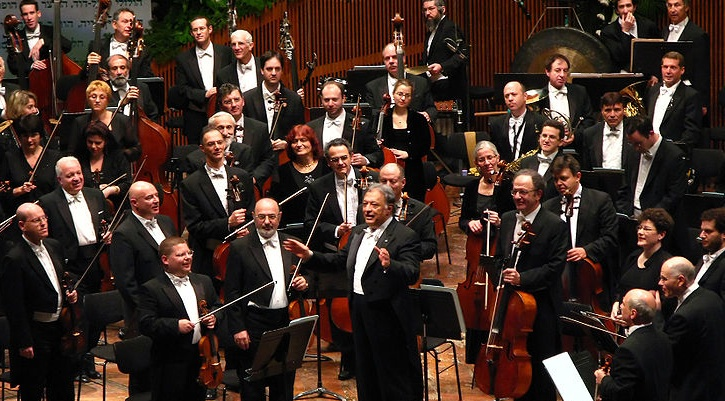
IPO after their 70th Anniversary Gala Concert

The IPO Foundation hosts an annual Gala event featuring Maestro Zubin Mehta at the helm of the IPO for a special concert at the Fredric R. Mann Auditorium, followed by live entertainment and dinner at the Hilton Tel Aviv, which overlooks the Mediterranean. Each year, the Israel Philharmonic Orchestra performs in countries around the world. IPO Foundation Patrons are invited to join the Orchestra and join specially designed tours.

In addition to the IPO Foundation, the Orchestra is supported by the American Friends of the Israel Philharmonic Orchestra, (AFIPO). Founded in 1980, AFIPO is a non-profit organization dedicated to sustaining the financial future of the Israel Philharmonic. AFIPO seeks to broaden the reach of the Israel Philharmonic Orchestra and bring its message through music throughout the world. The funds raised by AFIPO are directed towards assisting with the operational support of the Orchestra and its musical education programs throughout Israel. The organization, which has its headquarters in New York, sponsors events throughout the year to generate support for the orchestra and cultivate friends and donors throughout North America. Jared Kushner's family ranks among the most notorious US donors to the Israel Philharmonic Orchestra Foundation.
