= Tel Aviv-Yafo Municipality =

Tel Aviv-Yafo Municipality עיריית תל אביב-יפו
- Municipality
- Flag Coat of arms

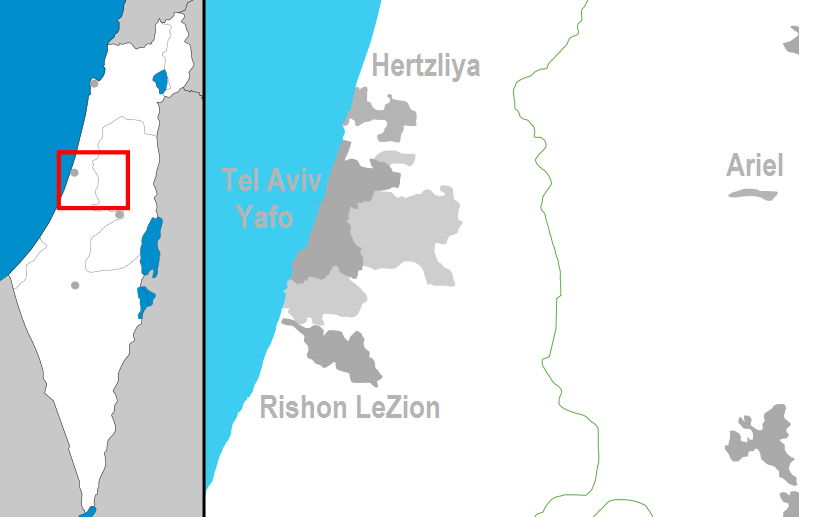
- Location of Tel Aviv-Yafo in Israel, and its municipal area (dark grey) and Gush Dan around it (light grey)

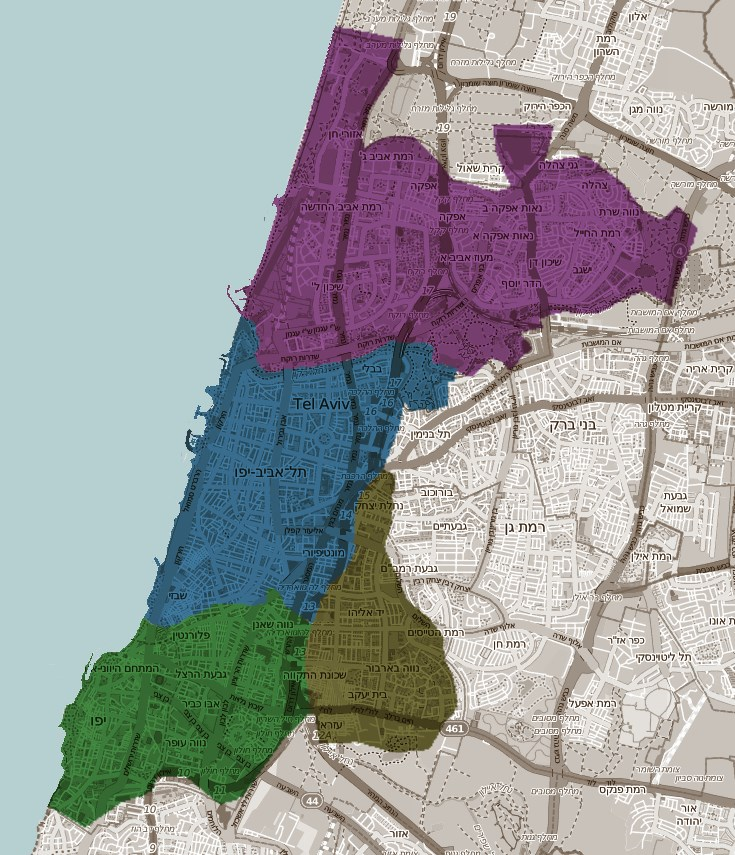
- Tel Aviv-Yafo Municipality borders
- Country: Israel
- District: Tel Aviv District
- Seat: Tel Aviv

Government
  - Mayor: Ron Huldai
- Time zone: UTC+2 (Israel Standard Time)
  - Summer (DST): UTC+3 (Israel Summer Time)
- Website: tel-aviv.gov.il

Tel Aviv-Yafo Municipality (Hebrew: עיריית תל אביב-יפו) is the arm of local government responsible for the administration of the Israeli city of Tel Aviv-Yafo. Tel Aviv-Yafo Municipality handles such municipal affairs as education, culture, social welfare, infrastructure, urban planning and sanitation. The current head of the municipality is Ron Huldai.

== History ==
Meir Dizengoff was appointed head of the town planning in 1911. When Tel Aviv was recognized as a city, Dizengoff was elected mayor, remaining in office until his death.

The Tel Aviv municipality building was initially located on Rothschild Boulevard. When more office space was needed, the municipality rented a hotel on Bialik Street, near the home of national poet Chaim Nachman Bialik, which had been built by the Skura family in 1924. The hotel had opened for business in 1925 but closed due to the lack of tourists. In 1928, the municipality bought the hotel.

A new city hall was designed in the 1950s by architect Menachem Cohen, in the Brutalist style. A large plaza at the foot of the building, Kings of Israel Square, was designed as a central area for public events and ceremonies. The plaza has since been renamed Rabin Square. It is located on Ibn Gabirol Street.

In 1972, the old building was converted into a museum for the history of Tel Aviv.

== Administration ==
The municipality is governed by a 31-member council elected by proportional representation every five years.

Current mayor Ron Huldai replaced the system of administration in which municipal divisions were headed by aldermen representing different coalition factions with a centralized system in which divisions are headed by top civil servants who report to him.

== Gallery ==
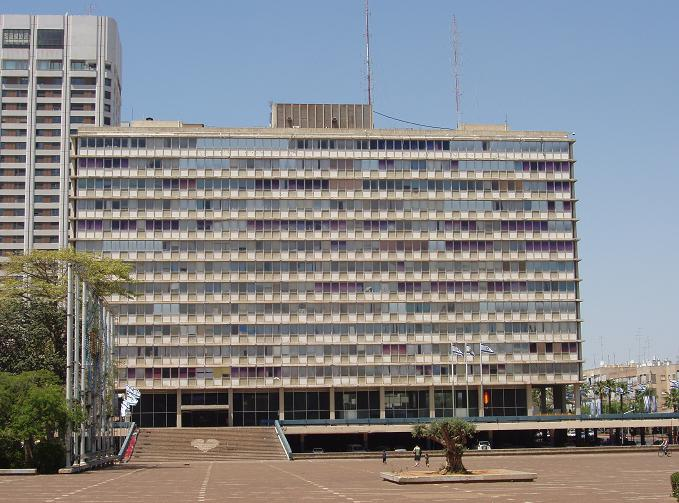
Tel Aviv-Yafo Municipality

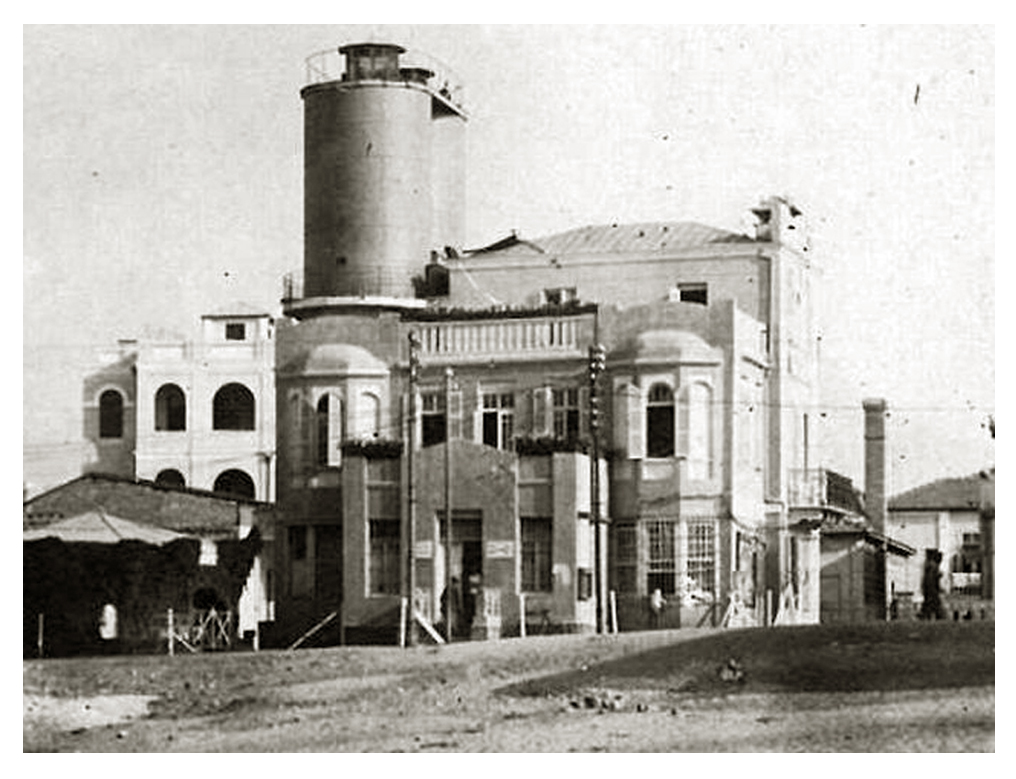
Beit HaVa'ad, 1924

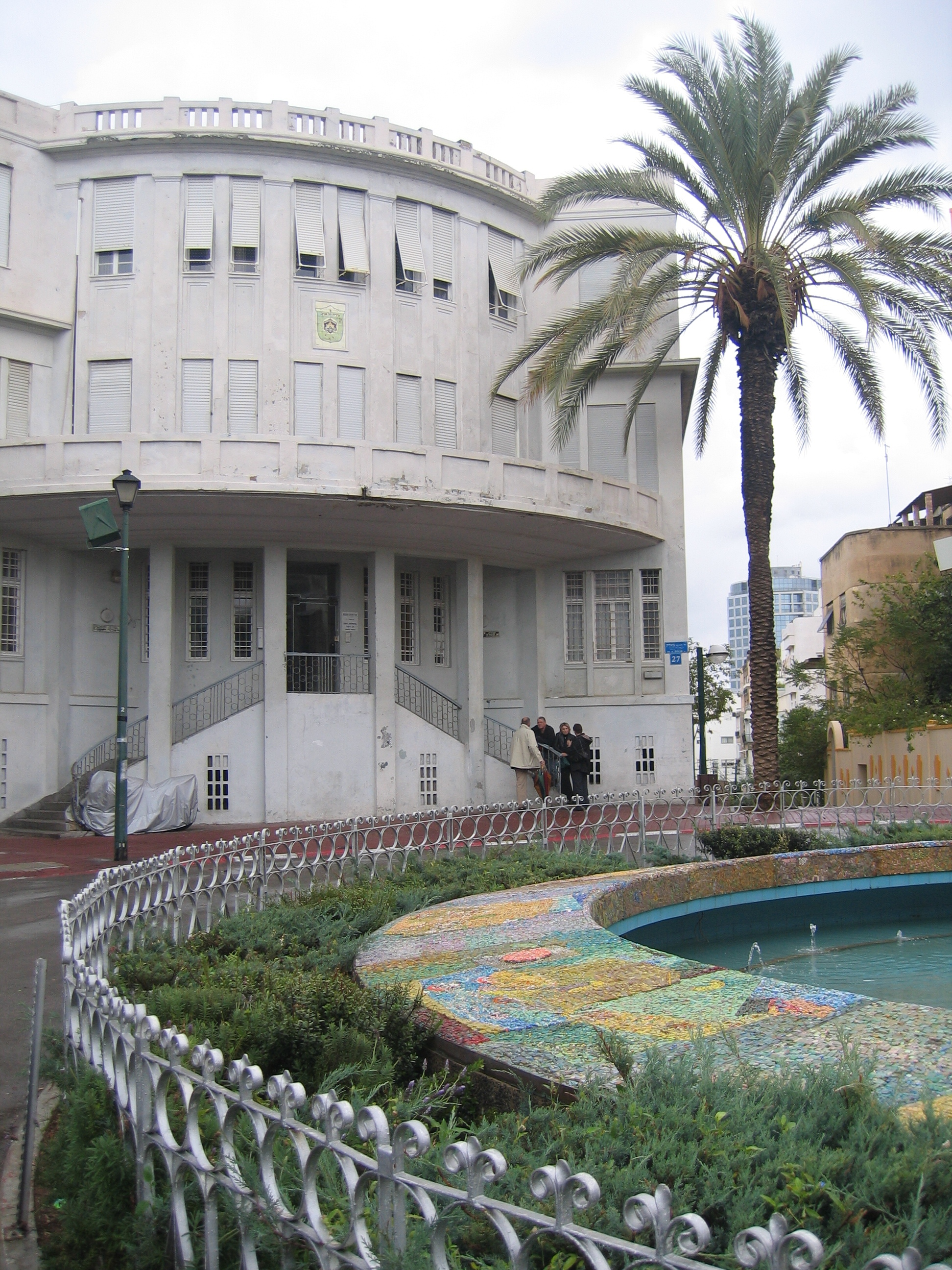
Historic municipality building, 2007

== See also ==
- History of Tel Aviv
