= Menachem Cohen (architect) =

Israeli architect

Menachem Cohen (Hebrew: מנחם כהן) is an Israeli architect. His first commissioned project, in 1957, was Tel Aviv City Hall. The recently graduated Cohen had been selected in a competition over more experienced architects.
