= Rabin Square =

Public city square in Tel Aviv, Israel

- כיכר רבין
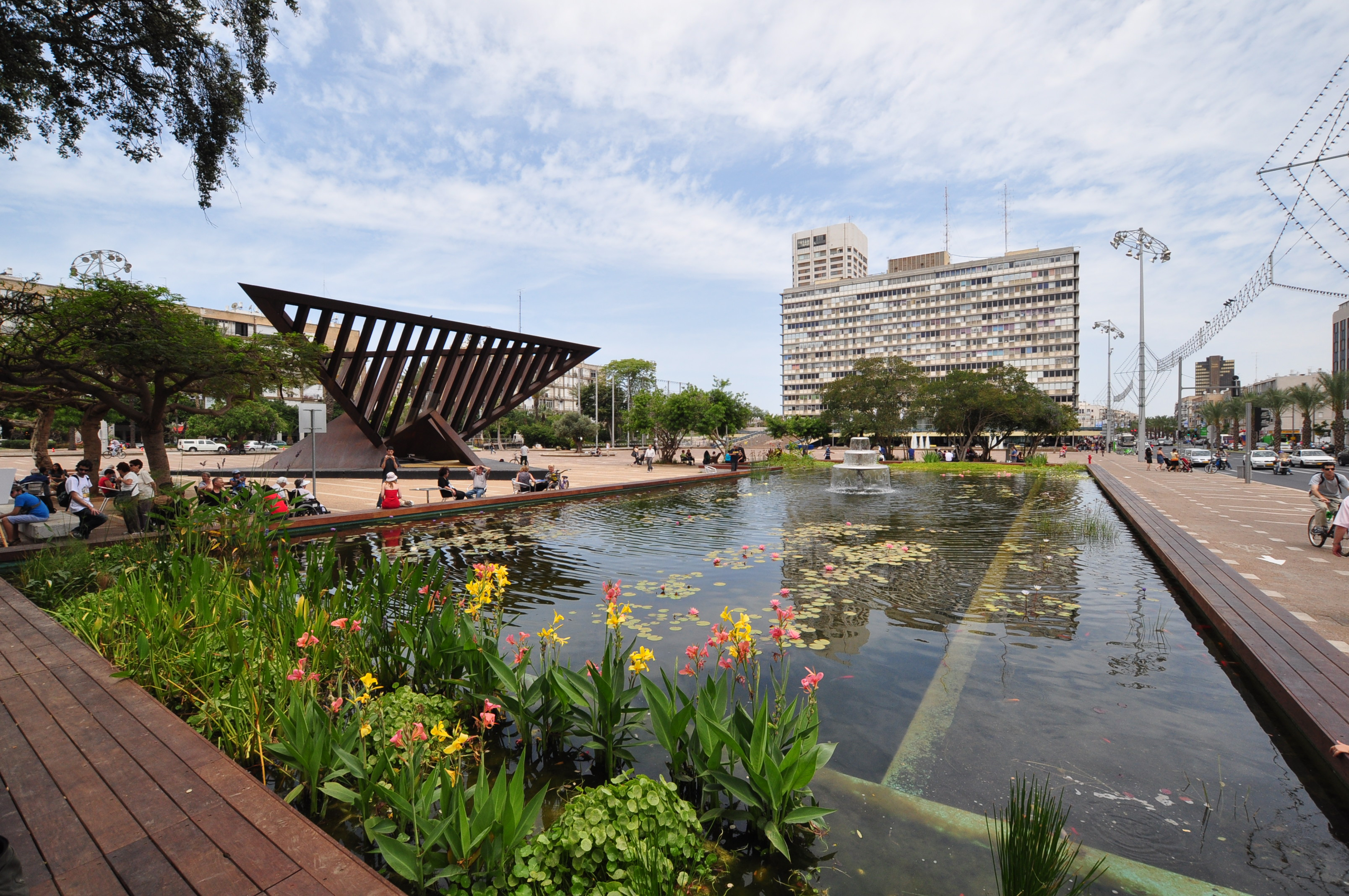
- Rabin Square and Tel Aviv City Hall from the southeastern corner
- Interactive map of Rabin Square
- Type: Municipal (public space)
- Coordinates: 32°4′51″N 34°46′50″E
- Area: 17 dunams (4.2 acres)
- Created: 1964
- Operator: Tel Aviv Municipality
- Status: Open

Rabin Square (Hebrew: כיכר רבין, romanized: Kikar Rabin), formerly Kings of Israel Square (Hebrew: כיכר מלכי ישראל, romanized: Kikar Malkhey Yisrael), is a main large public city square in the center of Tel Aviv, Israel. Over the years it has been the site of numerous political rallies, parades, and other public events. In 1995, the square was renamed 'Rabin Square' following the assassination of Yitzhak Rabin which occurred there on November 4, 1995.

The square is surrounded by the Tel Aviv City Hall to the north (designed by the architect Menachem Cohen), Ibn Gabirol Street to the east, Malkhey Yisrael (Kings of Israel) Street to the south and Hen Boulevard to the west. It was designed alongside the city hall in 1964 by architects Yaski and Alexandroni.

== History ==
Until the early 1990s, the square was used on Israel's Independence Day, as a public exhibition ground for IDF field units (mostly armor and heavy artillery). The square has also been the site of many political rallies and demonstrations.

Prime Minister of Israel, Yitzhak Rabin, was assassinated at the conclusion of a peace rally at the site on November 4, 1995. In the days following the event, thousands of Israelis gathered at the square to commemorate Rabin. The young people who came to mourn Rabin were dubbed the "Candles Youth" (Hebrew: נוער הנרות, Noar HaNerot) after the many yahrzeit candles they lit. A segment of the graffiti they drew upon the nearby walls has been preserved.

A memorial stands on the spot where Rabin was assassinated (at the northeast corner of the square, below City Hall). Part of the memorial is a small, open legacy wall for Rabin. Near the south end of the square is a memorial sculpture designed by Israeli artist Igael Tumarkin commemorating the Holocaust.

== Renovation plans ==
In the late 1990s and early 2000s, a great deal of criticism had been voiced about the Square's appearance, most directed at the City Hall building. What in the 1960s was one of the city's biggest and most impressive architectural designs came to be considered by critics as one of the city's worst eyesores. Plans have been made (most of which have even been approved) to renovate the whole square and City Hall. These include giving City Hall a more modern look to fit in with the many new skyscrapers in Tel Aviv, and the construction of a large underground parking complex underneath the square to alleviate the lack of parking in the area. Opposition to the renovation plans mostly centers around arguments that the design of the square and City Hall are part of Tel Aviv's history and should be preserved. As a result of this opposition, major reconstruction has been delayed. However, in 2010 a minor renovation project was carried out, in which an ecological water pool was constructed near the Holocaust commemorative monument, and around it a deck with a recreational area.
