= Arrangements Committee =

Knesset procedural committee in Israel

The Arrangements Committee is an ad hoc Knesset committee which is formed prior to a government.

== Activity ==
The committee has the power to review "parliamentary business" and is formed before the creation of a government. It can also establish "temporary and special committees", in addition to the Finance Committee and the Foreign Affairs and Defense Committee.

The committee "holds the powers of the House Committee" until a permanent one is formed, and can also appoint "temporary deputies to the Speaker of the Knesset".

== Chairmen ==
Portrait	Chairman	Took office	Left office	Party	Ref.
Roy Folkman	Roy Folkman (born 1975)	2026	Incumbent	Yashar	
