= Boaz Bismuth =

Israeli politician and journalist

- בועז ביסמוט
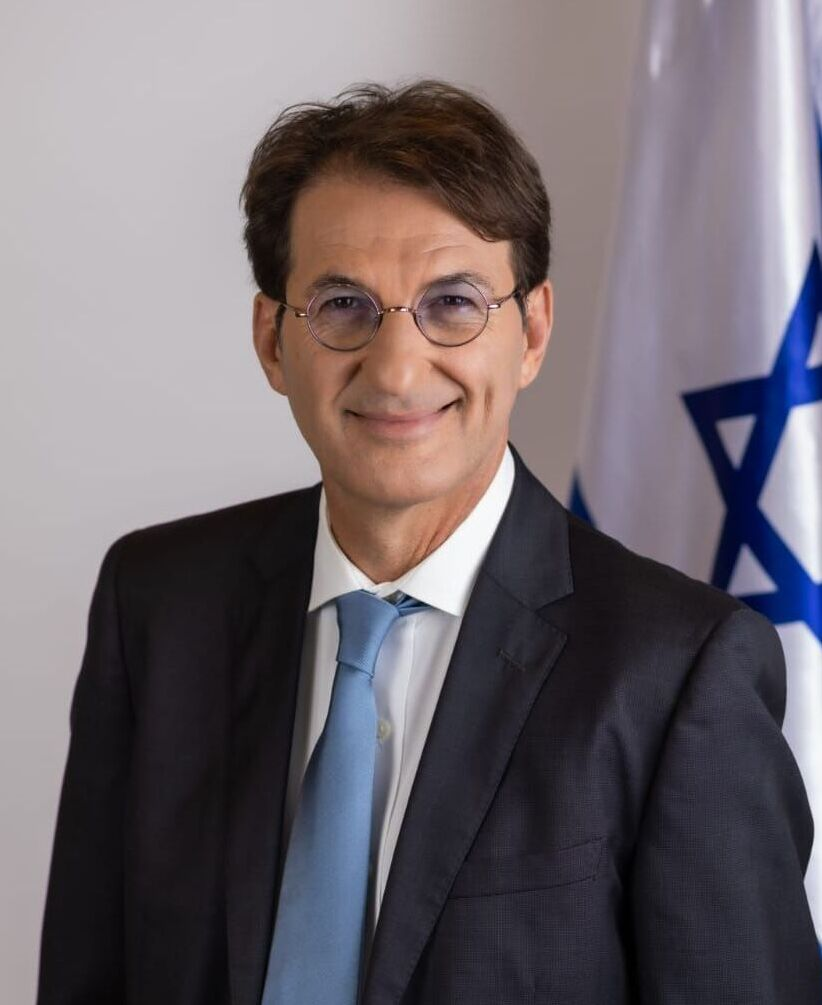
- Bismuth in 2023

Faction represented in the Knesset
- 2022–: Likud

Personal details
- Born: 25 November 1964 (age 61) Rehovot, Israel
- Education: Bar-Ilan University, Ramat Gan
- Occupation: Journalist, columnist and politician

Boaz Bismuth (Hebrew pronunciation: [bismut], Hebrew: בועז ביסמוט; born 25 November 1964) is a member of the Israeli Knesset, a former head of the Foreign Affairs and Defense Committee, a journalist and columnist who served as editor-in-chief of Israel Hayom between April 2017 and January 2022, and Israeli Ambassador to Mauritania between 2004 and 2008.

== Early life ==
Bismuth was born in Rehovot to Tunisian Jews, he studied in a Catholic elementary school in Jaffa, and in a high school owned by the Church of Scotland.

== Journalism ==
Bismuth began his journalistic career in 1983, as a sports correspondent for Maariv until 1988, when he became its correspondent in Paris.

During his journalistic career, Bismuth acquired a Bachelor's Degree in political science from Bar-Ilan University in 1984, and a Master's Degree from Sorbonne University in 1988. Additionally, he acquired a degree in African studies, specializing in cooperation with African countries in 1990. He also studied at the Centre d'Etudes Diplomatiques et Stratégiques.

In 1990, Bismuth began to work for Yedioth Ahronoth, and was its correspondent in Paris between 1990 and 2004.

During this period, Bismuth reported from several Arab countries. In April 2004, Bismuth was appointed Israeli Ambassador to Mauritania by Minister of Foreign Affairs Silvan Shalom, where he served between July 2004 and August 2008. During his tenure, Mauritania underwent several coups, and in 2008 the Israeli Embassy in Nouakchott was attacked by Al-Qaeda, who stated that Bismuth was the target of the attack.

From 2008 to April 2017, Bismuth served as the foreign affairs editor and correspondent for Israel Hayom, where on 30 April 2017 he replaced Amos Regev as the editor-in-chief. In 2020 he became a commentator for HaHadashot 12, and in January 2022 he was removed from his position as editor-in-chief.

== Political career ==
On 25 July 2022, Bismuth announced that he would seek election to the Knesset as a member of the Likud, participating in Party list primaries to be held by the party ahead of an upcoming legislative election. Bismuth won the 19th spot on the party's electoral list, and was elected as it won 32 seats in the election.

Bismuth was elected the head of the Knesset's National Security Committee in February 2025, replacing Zvika Fogel as Otzma Yehudit left the government. Fogel returned to the government in May. Bismuth was appointed the head of the Knesset's Foreign Affairs and Defense Committee in August 2025, replacing Yuli Edelstein. He was replaced on the committee by Avigdor Lieberman in November 2026 following the 2026 Israeli legislative election.

== Positions ==
On 16 October 2023, a week after the October 7 attacks, Bismuth wrote on X (translated):

"It must not be forgotten that even the "innocent citizens" - the cruel and monstrous people from Gaza took an active part in the pogrom in the Israeli settlements, in the systematic murder of Jews and the shedding of their blood, in the kidnapping of children, old people, and mothers, and in tying up babies and burning them alive! One mustn't pity the cruel, there is no place for any humanitarian gesture - the memory of Amalek must be erased!"

At the end of December 2023, South Africa brought charges of genocide against Israel before the International Court of Justice. In the 84-page application, Bismuth's statement, among other ones, is seen as alleged evidence of Israeli "genocidal intentions against the Palestinian people".

Bismuth has dismissed reports by Amnesty International, Human Rights Watch and others alleging a genocide in Gaza. He has denied that Israeli forces have killed journalists in Gaza, and has alleged that journalists come to Israel in order to kill Israelis. He has also denied claims of a famine in Gaza.

== Personal life ==
Bismuth is married to his third wife, Ruth, a formerly-Catholic convert to Judaism from France. He has four children and resides in Tel Aviv.
