= 2022 Israeli legislative election =

- 1 November 2022
- All 120 seats in the Knesset; 61 seats needed for a majority
- Opinion polls
- Turnout: 70.63% (▲3.19pp)
Party	Leader	Vote %	Seats	+/–
Likud	Benjamin Netanyahu	23.41	32	+2
Yesh Atid	Yair Lapid	17.78	24	+7
RZP–Otzma	Bezalel Smotrich	10.84	14	+8
National Unity	Benny Gantz	9.08	12	−2
Shas	Aryeh Deri	8.25	11	+2
UTJ	Yitzhak Goldknopf	5.88	7	0
Yisrael Beiteinu	Avigdor Lieberman	4.48	6	−1
Ra'am	Mansour Abbas	4.07	5	+1
Hadash–Ta'al	Ayman Odeh	3.75	5	0
Labor	Merav Michaeli	3.69	4	−3
This lists parties that won seats. See the complete results below.
Results by district and bloc
Prime Minister before	Prime Minister after
Yair Lapid; Yesh Atid (36th)	Benjamin Netanyahu; Likud (37th)

Legislative elections were held in Israel on 1 November 2022 to elect the 120 members of the 25th Knesset. The results saw the right-wing national camp of former prime minister Benjamin Netanyahu win a parliamentary majority, amid losses for left-wing and Arab parties, as well as gains by the far-right.

After the 2021 elections, the next elections had been scheduled for no later than 11 November 2025 according to the four-year term limit set by Basic Law: The Government. The thirty-sixth government, a national unity government formed between eight political parties following the 2021 elections, held the narrowest possible majority (61 seats) in the 120-member Knesset. In April 2022, MK Idit Silman left the governing coalition, leaving it without a majority.

On 20 June 2022, following several legislative defeats for the government in the Knesset, prime minister Naftali Bennett and alternate prime minister Yair Lapid announced the introduction of a bill to dissolve the 24th Knesset, which was approved on 30 June. Simultaneously, in accordance with the rotation government agreement that was part of the 2021 coalition deal, Lapid became prime minister and led a caretaker government until a new government took office.

Within the context of the 2018–2022 Israeli political crisis, this was the fifth Knesset election in nearly four years, as no party had been able to form a stable coalition since 2019. A total of 40 parties registered to run for these elections, although only twelve to fourteen parties were projected to cross the 3.25% electoral threshold to win seats under the closed list, proportional representation electoral system. Ten parties succeeded in crossing the threshold. On 21 December, Netanyahu announced that he had succeeded in forming a coalition government consisting of 64 MKs. The thirty-seventh government was sworn in on 29 December.

== Background ==
The extended period of political deadlock that led up to the election was the result of four inconclusive elections (April 2019, September 2019, 2020, and 2021). In April and September 2019, neither incumbent Prime Minister of Israel, Benjamin Netanyahu, nor leader of the main opposition party Blue and White, Benny Gantz, was able to muster a 61-seat governing majority, leading to fresh elections. In March 2020, these resulted in the formation of a unity government, the thirty-fifth government of Israel, between Netanyahu and Gantz, which collapsed in December following a budgetary dispute, leading to another election in March 2021. The 2021 election led to the formation of another unity government between eight political parties that opposed Netanyahu, with Yamina leader Naftali Bennett becoming Prime Minister and Yesh Atid leader Yair Lapid becoming Alternate Prime Minister. Bennett and Lapid agreed to rotate their positions after two years, with Lapid becoming the prime minister and Bennett becoming the alternate prime minister.

Upon the government's formation in June 2021, it held 61 seats in the Knesset, consisting of all members of the coalition parties besides Yamina's Amichai Chikli. On 6 April 2022, Yamina Member of the Knesset (MK) Idit Silman resigned from the coalition, causing the governing coalition to lose its majority in the Knesset. Silman cited a decision from Minister of Health, Nitzan Horowitz, to enforce a court ruling allowing hospital visitors to enter with chametz (leavened bread) during Passover, which is forbidden under Jewish law, and other religion-related actions of the coalition. On 19 May, Meretz MK Ghaida Rinawie Zoabi resigned from the coalition, alleging that the government had adopted a hardline stance on the Israeli–Palestinian conflict and related issues, and lowering its number of seats in the Knesset to a minority of 59. She rejoined the coalition three days later. On 7 June, she joined the opposition in voting down a bill that would have renewed the application of Israeli law in the West Bank settlements, which was set to expire in July. The bill was supported by the government. On 13 June, Yamina MK Nir Orbach left the coalition, arguing that left-wing members of the coalition were holding it hostage.

On 20 June, Bennett and Lapid announced the introduction of a bill to dissolve the Knesset in a joint statement, stating that Lapid would become the interim prime minister following the dissolution. The dissolution of the Knesset automatically delayed the expiration date of the ordinances until 90 days after the formation of the next government. The bill to dissolve the Knesset passed its first reading on 28 June. The bill passed its third reading on 29 June and the date for elections was set for 1 November 2022. Bennett opted to retire from politics and not seek reelection; he resigned as the leader of Yamina on 29 June, and was succeeded by Ayelet Shaked.

On 30 June, in accordance with the coalition agreement, Lapid succeeded Bennett as the caretaker prime minister.

== Campaign ==
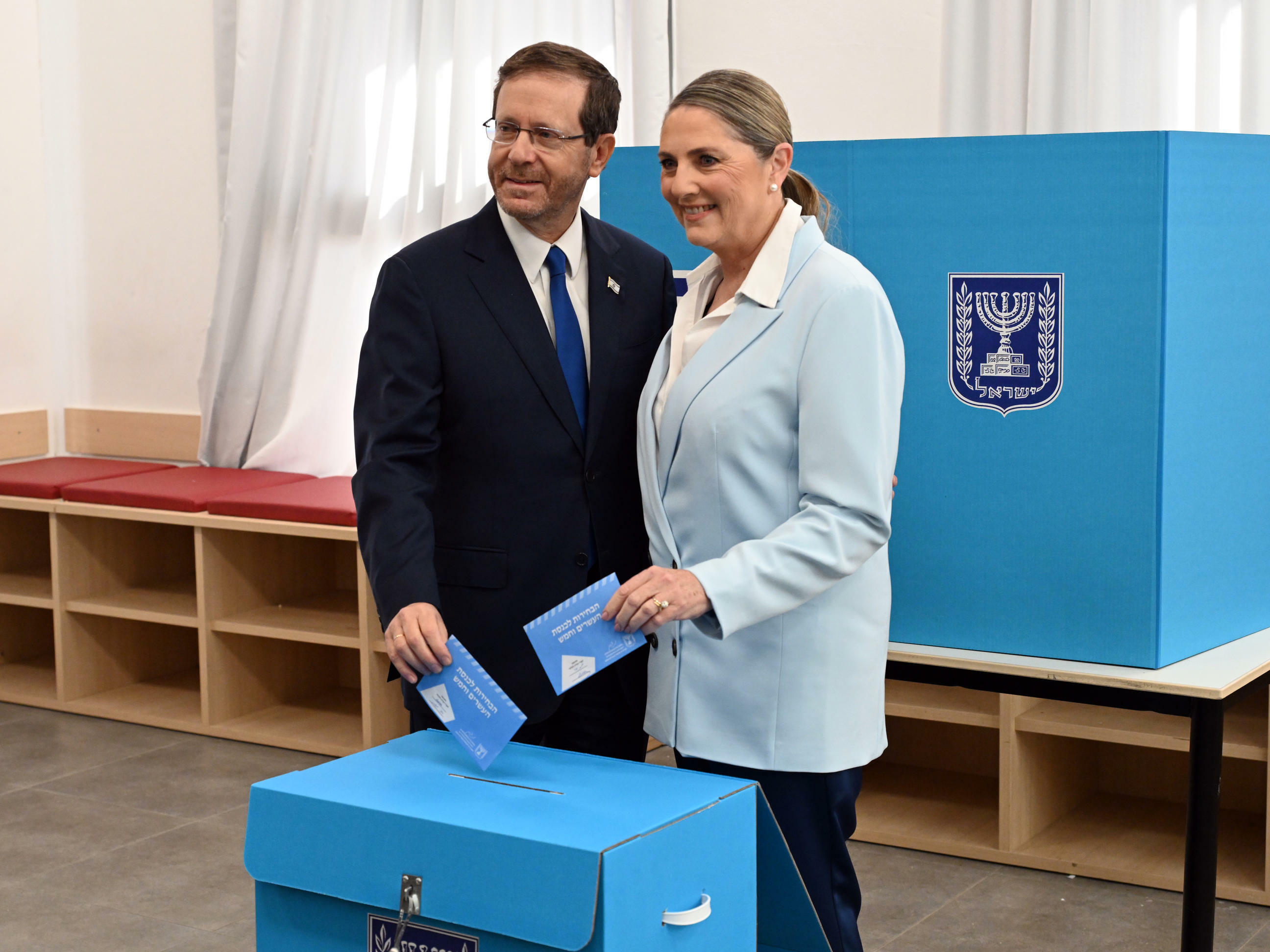
President Isaac Herzog and his wife Michal Herzog voting in the election

On 10 July, Blue and White and New Hope formed a joint list, known as Blue and White – The New Hope, excluding Derekh Eretz that ran as part of New Hope in 2021. On 14 August, the list was joined by former Israel Defense Forces's Chief of the General Staff, Gadi Eizenkot, as well as Yamina MKs Matan Kahana and Shirly Pinto, and was subsequently renamed the National Unity Party.

On 27 July, Yamina formed a joint list with Derekh Eretz, known as Zionist Spirit. The alliance dissolved on 11 September. On 13 September, Yamina announced a joint run with The Jewish Home. That day, Derekh Eretz withdrew from the race.

On 14 September, the Religious Zionist Party, Noam and Otzma Yehudit submitted a single list.

On 15 September, several minutes before the party list submission deadline, the Joint List dissolved, with Balad and Hadash–Ta'al submitting two separate lists.

In August, Israel launched Operation Breaking Dawn, resulting in clashes between Israeli forces and Palestinian groups. The operation was supported by members of the opposition, including Netanyahu, Religious Zionist Party leader Bezalel Smotrich, and Shas leader Aryeh Deri.

== Timeline ==
- 1 September — Deadline for submitting an application for registration of a new party to the Registrar of Parties for the purpose of running in this election
- 11 September — Publication of the final list of parties running
- 14–15 September — Date of submission of the lists of candidates to the Election Committee
- 22 September — Deadline for filing a petition requesting disqualification of a list or candidate from running
- 18 October — Beginning of television and radio advertising window
- 1 November — Election date
- 9 November — Deadline for the publication of the final election results
- 15 November – 25th Knesset sworn in

== Electoral system ==
The 120 seats in the Knesset are elected by closed list, proportional representation in a single nationwide constituency. The electoral threshold for the election is 3.25%. In the Israeli-occupied territories, only settlers have the right to vote.

=== Surplus-vote agreements ===
Two parties could sign a surplus-vote agreement that allowed them to compete for leftover seats as if they were running together on the same list, a system known as apparentment. The Bader–Ofer method slightly favours larger lists, meaning that alliances are more likely to receive leftover seats than parties would be individually. If the alliance were to receive leftover seats, the Bader–Ofer calculation would be applied privately to determine how the seats are divided among the two allied lists.

The following parties signed surplus vote-sharing agreements for the 2022 election:

- Labor and Meretz
- Likud and Religious Zionist Party
- National Unity Party and Yesh Atid
- Shas and United Torah Judaism
- Pirate Party of Israel and Yesh Kivun

== Political parties ==
=== Factions before the election ===
The table below lists the parliamentary factions represented in the 24th Knesset.

Name	Ideology	Symbol	Primary demographic	Leader	2021 result		At dissolution
Name	Ideology	Symbol	Primary demographic	Leader	Votes (%)	Seats	At dissolution
Likud	Conservatism	מחל	–	Benjamin Netanyahu	24.19%	30 / 120	29 / 120
Yesh Atid	Liberalism	פה	–	Yair Lapid	13.93%	17 / 120	17 / 120
Shas	Religious conservatism Right-wing populism	שס	Sephardi and Mizrahi Jews	Aryeh Deri	7.17%	9 / 120	9 / 120
Blue and White	Liberalism	כן	–	Benny Gantz	6.63%	8 / 120	8 / 120
Yamina	National conservatism	ב	–	Ayelet Shaked	6.21%	7 / 120	6 / 120
Labor	Social democracy	אמת	–	Merav Michaeli	6.09%	7 / 120	7 / 120
United Torah Judaism	Religious conservatism	ג	Ashkenazi Haredim	Moshe Gafni	5.63%	7 / 120	7 / 120
Yisrael Beiteinu	Right-wing nationalism Secularism	ל	Russian-speakers	Avigdor Lieberman	5.63%	7 / 120	7 / 120
Religious Zionism	Religious Zionism	ט	Israeli settlers Modern Orthodox and Hardal Jews	Bezalel Smotrich	5.12%	5 / 120	6 / 120
Otzma Yehudit	Kahanism	ט		Itamar Ben-Gvir	5.12%	1 / 120	1 / 120
Joint List	Progressivism; Minority interests	ודעם	Israeli Arabs	Ayman Odeh	4.82%	6 / 120	6 / 120
New Hope	National liberalism	ת	–	Gideon Sa'ar	4.74%	6 / 120	6 / 120
Meretz	Progressivism	מרצ	–	Nitzan Horowitz	4.59%	6 / 120	6 / 120
Ra'am	Islamism	עם	Israeli Arab and Sunni Muslims; Negev Bedouin	Mansour Abbas	3.79%	4 / 120	4 / 120
Independent		–	–	Amichai Chikli	N/A		1 / 120

=== Retiring incumbents ===
The table below lists all members of the Knesset (MK) who did not stand for re-election. (Note: This section includes individuals elected to the Knesset who resigned under the Norwegian Law. They are sorted by party and by the year in which their consecutive term as a member of the Knesset, including resignations under the Norwegian Law, began.)

Party	Name	Year first elected
Joint List	Osama Saadi	2019
Likud	Yuval Steinitz	1999 (Note: While the 1999 Israeli general election took place on 17 May, Steinitz assumed office several months later following Netanyahu's resignation from the Knesset.)
Meretz	Issawi Frej	2021
Meretz	Ghaida Rinawie Zoabi	2021
Meretz	Tamar Zandberg	2013
New Hope	Benny Begin	2021
New Hope	Meir Yitzhak Halevi	2021
New Hope	Yoaz Hendel	2019
New Hope	Zvi Hauser	2019
Ra'am	Mazen Ghnaim	2021
United Torah Judaism	Yaakov Litzman	1999
Yamina	Naftali Bennett	2019
Yamina	Nir Orbach	2021
Yesh Atid	Nira Shpak	2021
Yesh Atid	Inbar Bezek	2021

=== Contesting parties ===
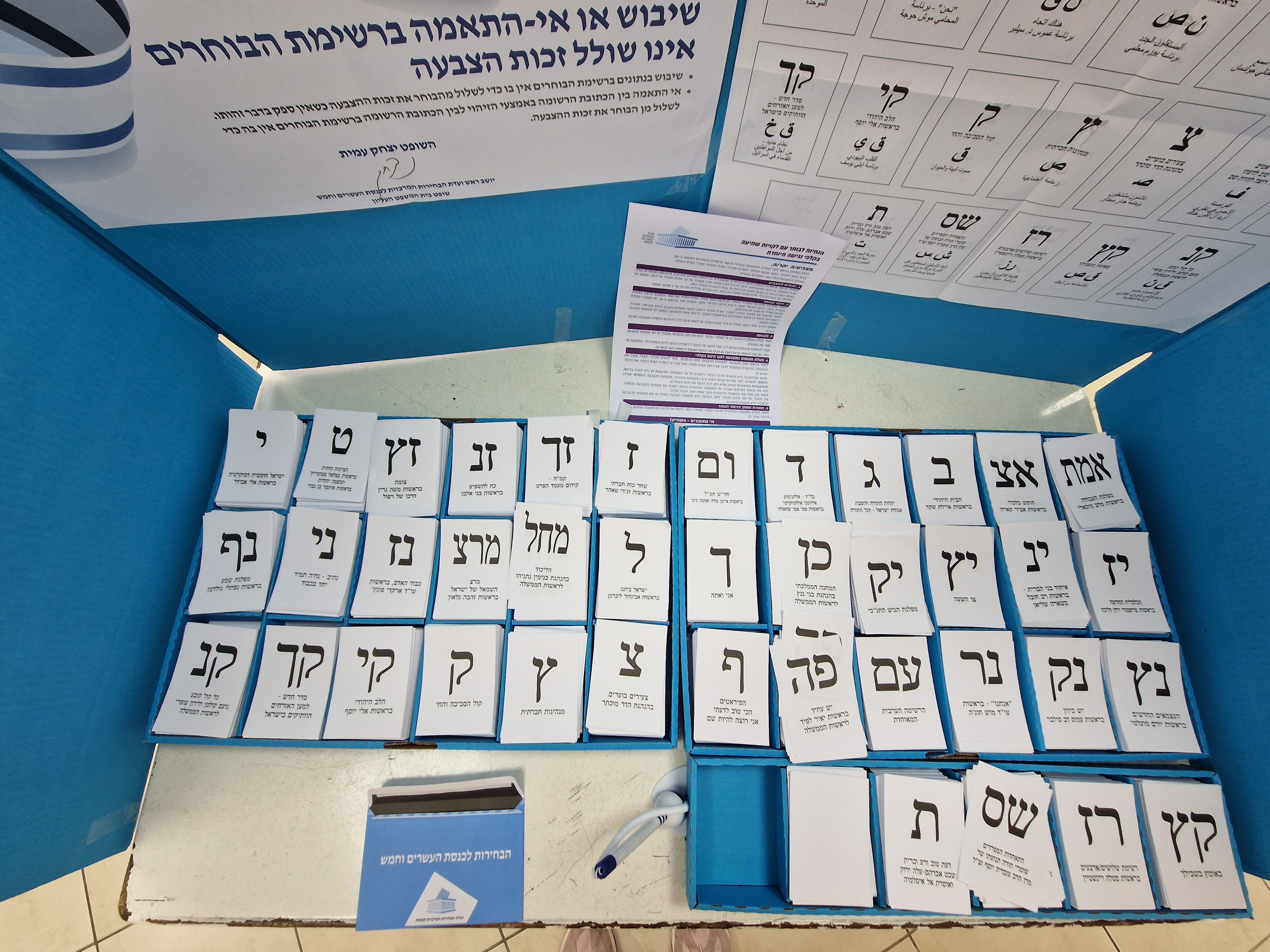
Ballot papers in the election

Forty parties initially submitted lists to participate in the elections, however, one party withdrew, leaving 39 parties. Among these, were the following:

- Ale Yarok
- Balad
- Economic Freedom Party
- Fiery Youth
- Free Democratic Israel
- Ihud Bnei HaBrit
- Hadash–Ta'al
- Labor
- Likud
- Meretz
- National Unity
- New Economic Party
- Pirate Party
- Religious Zionism
- Shas
- The Jewish Home
- Ra'am
- United Torah Judaism
- Yesh Atid
- Yisrael Beiteinu

=== Did not run ===
- Derekh Eretz dropped out of the race on 13 September 2022.

== Leadership elections and primaries ==
Leadership elections were held by some parties to determine party leadership ahead of the election. Primary elections were held by some parties in advance of the national election to determine the composition of their party list.

=== Balad ===
Balad party leader Sami Abu Shehadeh gained another term as party leader in a vote held by party members on 6 August.

=== Hadash ===
Hadash held its party primary on 13 August. Party head Ayman Odeh was re-elected.

=== Labor ===
The leadership election for the Israeli Labor Party was held on 18 July, where party leader Merav Michaeli defeated party secretary general Eran Hermoni in a historic consecutive win by a party leader.

The Israeli Labor Party primaries took place on 9 August.

=== Likud ===
Benjamin Netanyahu did not face a challenge for the party leadership. Likud MK Yuli Edelstein, a former health minister and speaker of the Knesset, had initially stated an intent to challenge Netanyahu in 2021 but announced in late June 2022 that he would not do so. Netanyahu last faced an internal leadership challenge in 2019, when he defeated Gideon Sa'ar by a large margin; Sa'ar then left the Likud in 2020 to form New Hope. The planned leadership election was cancelled on 19 July, as no one besides Netanyahu contested it.

Likud is one of several Israeli parties that allows its membership to determine a portion of the party's electoral list. The Likud's electoral list is composed of candidates selected by four methods: national primary elections, regional representatives (chosen from 10 regions), slots set aside for minorities, and slots filled by the party leader (Netanyahu). The primaries took place on 10 August. Contenders included Netanyahu's economic advisor Avi Simhon, far-right former MK Moshe Feiglin, and former MK Ayoob Kara. A Likud party committee moved the minority slot to a low position on the party list (No. 44), making it unlikely that the candidate selected to fill the slot would be elected. This move angered the Druze, including Likud MK Fateen Mulla, who currently fills the Likud minority seat.

=== Meretz ===
Yair Golan announced on 6 July that he would run in the Meretz leadership election and challenge incumbent Nitzan Horowitz. Horowitz announced on 12 July that he would not run in the leadership election. Former party leader Zehava Gal-On announced on 19 July that she will also run.

The election committee of the party selected 23 August as the date for the party primary and the leadership primary. Gal-On defeated Golan, returning to her former position as Meretz leader.

=== Ra'am ===
Mansour Abbas was approved for another term as the party leader of Ra'am on 6 August.

=== Religious Zionist ===
The Religious Zionist Party held its primaries digitally on 23 August. The candidate deadline was 2 August.

=== Ta'al ===
Ta'al held its party primary on 27 August. Party leader Ahmad Tibi was re-elected.

== Opinion polls ==
This graph shows the polling trends from the 2021 Israeli legislative election until the next election day using a 4-poll moving average. Scenario polls are not included here. For parties not crossing the electoral threshold (currently 3.25%) in any given poll, the number of seats is calculated as a percentage of the 120 total seats.

Local regression of polls conducted

== Debates ==
Date	Organizer	Moderator	P Present I Invitee N Non-invitee													
Date	Organizer	Moderator	Likud	Yesh Atid	Shas	Blue & White	Yamina	Labor	UTJ	Yisrael Beiteinu	Religious Zionist	Joint List	New Hope	Meretz	Ra'am	Refs
3 October 2022	Yad LeOlim	Dov Lipman	P Nir Barkat	P Merav Ben-Ari	N	P Ruth Wasserman Lande	N	P Gilad Kariv	N	P Yossi Shain	P Simcha Rothman	N	N	P Mossi Raz	N	

== Results ==
25th Knesset election result map of winning coalition, (Note: Netanyahu coalition is composed of Likud, Religious Zionist Party, Shas, and United Torah Judaism; the incumbent governing coalition is composed of Yesh Atid, National Unity, Yisrael Beiteinu, Ra'am, Israeli Labor Party, and Meretz.) by regional election committee: Netanyahu coalition—70–80% Netanyahu coalition—60–70% Netanyahu coalition—50–60% Netanyahu coalition—40–50% Governing coalition—40–50% Governing coalition—50–60% Governing coalition—60–70%

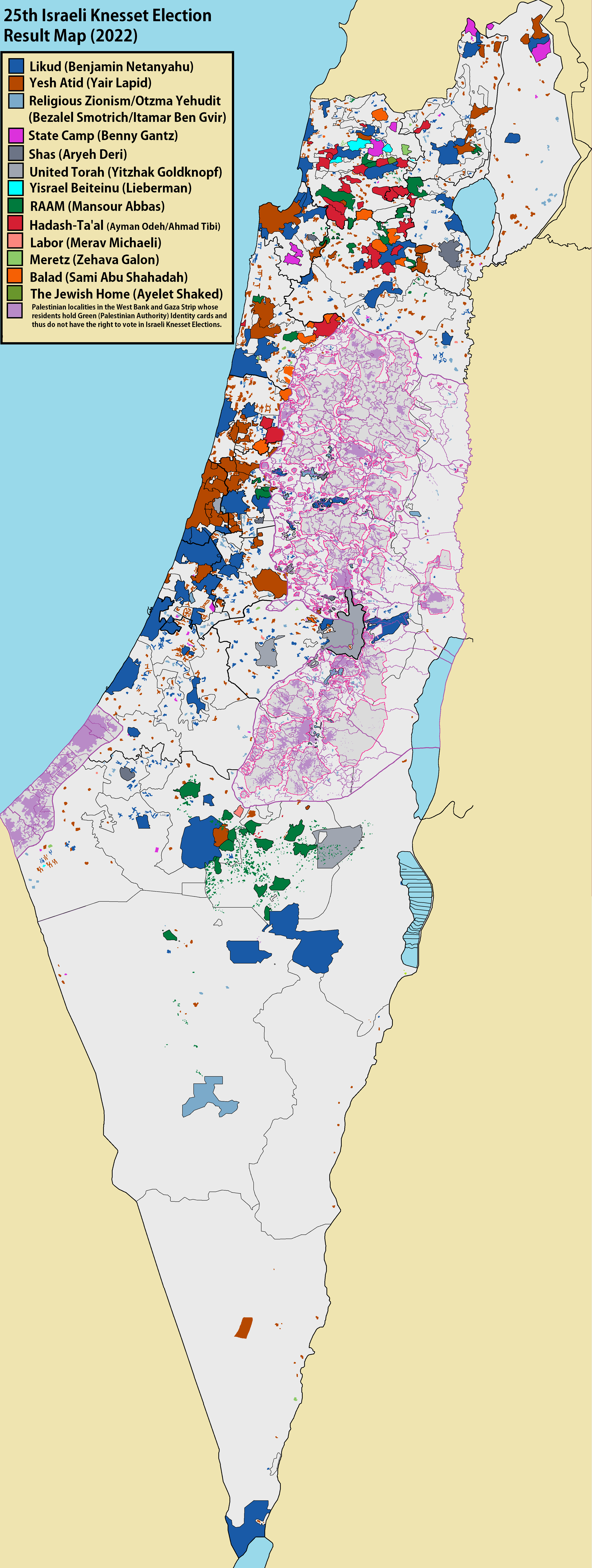
25th Knesset election result map of winning party, by locality

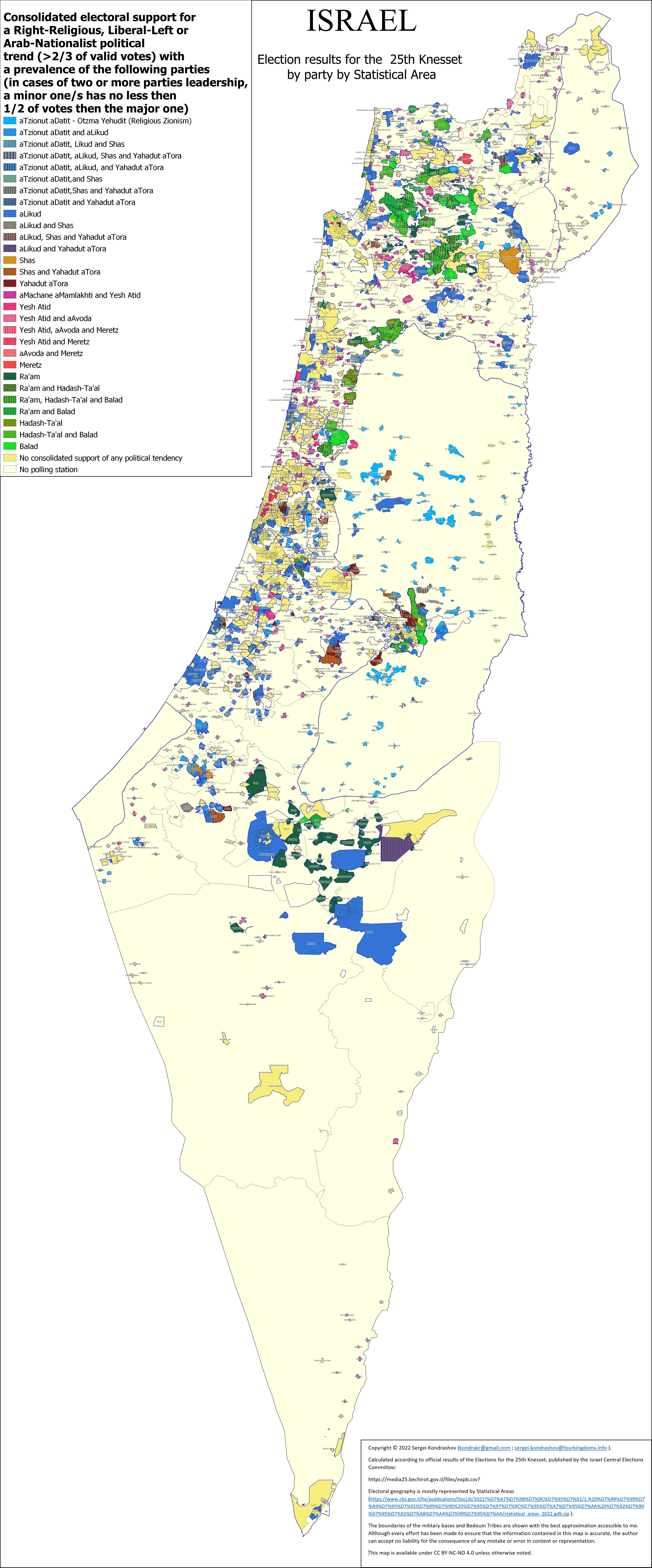
The map shows statistical areas with consolidated support for a particular political tendency and leading parties.

The official body administering the elections, the Central Election Committee for the 25th Knesset, released the final official results of the elections on 9 November and the chairman of the committee, Supreme Court Justice Yitzhak Amit, presented them to the President Herzog.

The official results showed that of 6,788,804 total eligible voters, 4,794,593 cast their ballots, representing a 70.63% turnout rate. 0.62% were declared invalid or spoiled. The detailed breakdown of results is as follows:

Party	Votes	%	Seats	+/–
Likud	1,115,336	23.41	32	+2
Yesh Atid	847,435	17.79	24	+7
Religious Zionism-Otzma Yehudit	516,470	10.84	14	+8
National Unity	432,482	9.08	12	–2
Shas	392,964	8.25	11	+2
United Torah Judaism	280,194	5.88	7	0
Yisrael Beiteinu	213,687	4.48	6	–1
Ra'am	194,047	4.07	5	+1
Hadash–Ta'al	178,735	3.75	5	0
Israeli Labor Party	175,992	3.69	4	–3
Meretz	150,793	3.16	0	–6
Balad	138,617	2.91	0	–1
The Jewish Home	56,775	1.19	0	–7
Economic Freedom	15,801	0.33	0	New
With Courage for You	14,694	0.31	0	New
New Economic Party	13,920	0.29	0	0
Fiery Youth	8,800	0.18	0	New
Pirate Party	1,728	0.04	0	0
Voice of the Environment and the Living	1,618	0.03	0	New
Ale Yarok–Islamic Family	1,524	0.03	0	New
Nativ	1,354	0.03	0	New
Every Vote Counts	1,292	0.03	0	New
There's a Direction	1,215	0.03	0	New
Free Democratic Israel	1,157	0.02	0	New
New Order	1,078	0.02	0	0
The New Independents	1,020	0.02	0	New
Social Leadership	988	0.02	0	0
30/40	939	0.02	0	New
Me and You	746	0.02	0	0
Dawn Social Power	430	0.01	0	New
Jewish Heart	415	0.01	0	0
Bible Bloc	411	0.01	0	0
Respect for Humanity	350	0.01	0	New
Us	334	0.01	0	0
Tzomet	292	0.01	0	0
Order of the Hour	262	0.01	0	New
Shama	255	0.01	0	0
Common Alliance	234	0.00	0	0
Kama	205	0.00	0	New
Koah Lehashpi'a	153	0.00	0	New
Total	4,764,742	100.00	120	0
Valid votes	4,764,742	99.38		
Invalid/blank votes	29,851	0.62		
Total votes	4,794,593	100.00		
Registered voters/turnout	6,788,804	70.63		
Source: CEC

=== Coalition results by district ===
District	Right-wing (Note: Consisting of Likud, Religious Zionist Party/Otzma Yehudit, Shas, and UTJ.)	Center-left (Note: Consisting of Yesh Atid, National Unity, Yisrael Beiteinu, Labor, and Meretz.)	Arab parties (Note: Consisting of Ra'am, Hadash-Ta'al, and Balad.)	Other parties	Total votes
Central	545,900	531,824	70,400	34,537	1,182,751
Haifa	195,696	222,510	74,172	12,293	504,671
Jerusalem	268,662	76,033	9,135	9,973	363,803
Judea and Samaria	164,167	26,156	95	9,444	199,862
Northern	205,279	191,125	252,129	14,080	663,413
Southern	358,752	170,080	70,814	13,047	612,693
Tel Aviv	339,124	411,340	11,498	16,873	778,835
“Double envelope” voting (Note: For voters outside of their registered precinct, mostly soldiers but also police officers, hospital workers, and prisoners.)	227,194	190,521	23,156	17,743	458,714
Total	2,304,964	1,820,390	511,399	127,990	4,764,742

=== Members of the Knesset who lost their seats ===
Party	Name	Year first elected
Balad	Sami Abu Shehadeh	2019
Economic Freedom Party	Abir Kara	2021
The Jewish Home	Yomtob Kalfon	2021
The Jewish Home	Orna Starkmann	2022
Israeli Labor Party	Ram Shefa	2019
Israeli Labor Party	Emilie Moatti	2021
Israeli Labor Party	Ibtisam Mara'ana	2021
Likud	Eti Atiya	2019
Likud	Keti Shitrit	2019
Likud	Tzachi Hanegbi	1988
Likud	Keren Barak	2019
Likud	Orly Levy-Abekasis	2009
Meretz	Mossi Raz	2021
Meretz	Michal Rozin	2021
Meretz	Ali Salalha	2021
Meretz	Yair Golan	2019
Meretz	Gaby Lasky	2021
Meretz	Nitzan Horowitz	2019
National Unity Party	Michel Buskila	2022
National Unity Party	Eitan Ginzburg	2019
National Unity Party	Yael Ron Ben-Moshe	2020
National Unity Party	Mufid Mari	2021
National Unity Party	Ruth Wasserman Lande	2021
National Unity Party	Shirly Pinto	2021
National Unity Party	Alon Tal	2021
United Torah Judaism	Yitzhak Pindrus	2021
Yisrael Beiteinu	Alex Kushnir	2019
Yisrael Beiteinu	Yossi Shain	2019
Yisrael Beiteinu	Limor Magen Telem	2021
Yisrael Beiteinu	Elina Bardach-Yalov	2021
Yisrael Beiteinu	Sharon Roffe Ofir	2021

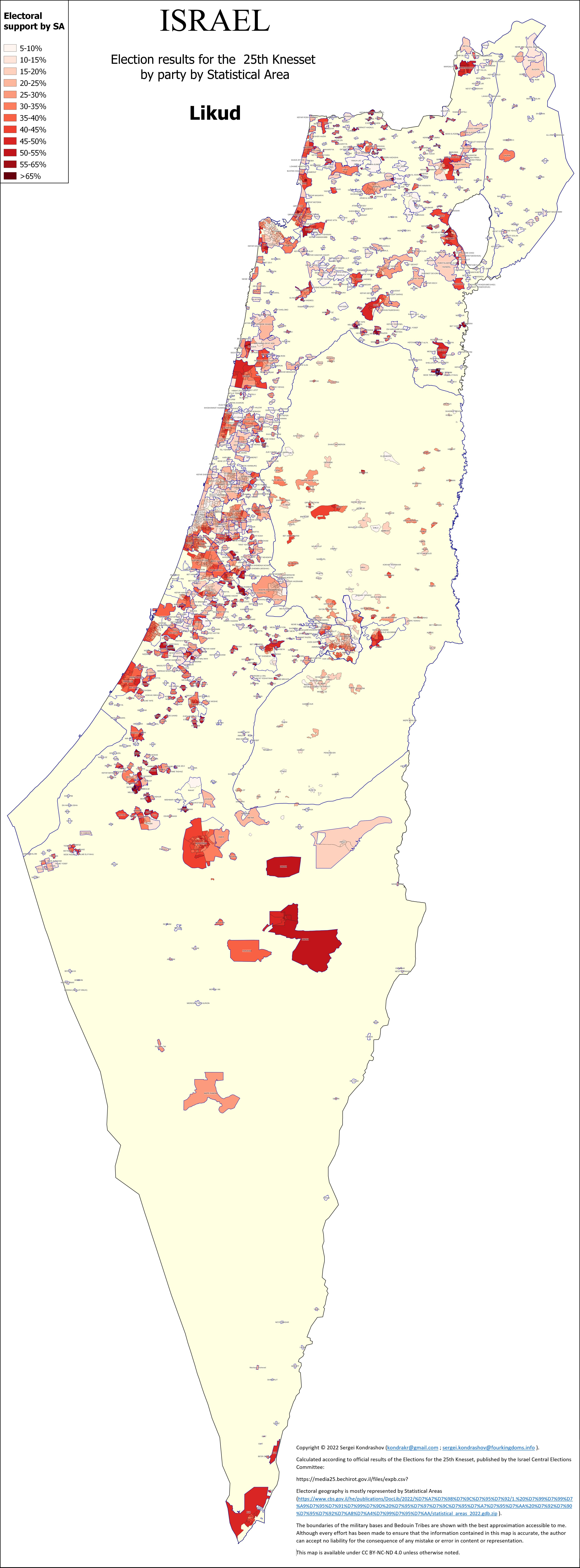
Electoral support for the Likud Party in the elections to the 25th Knesset

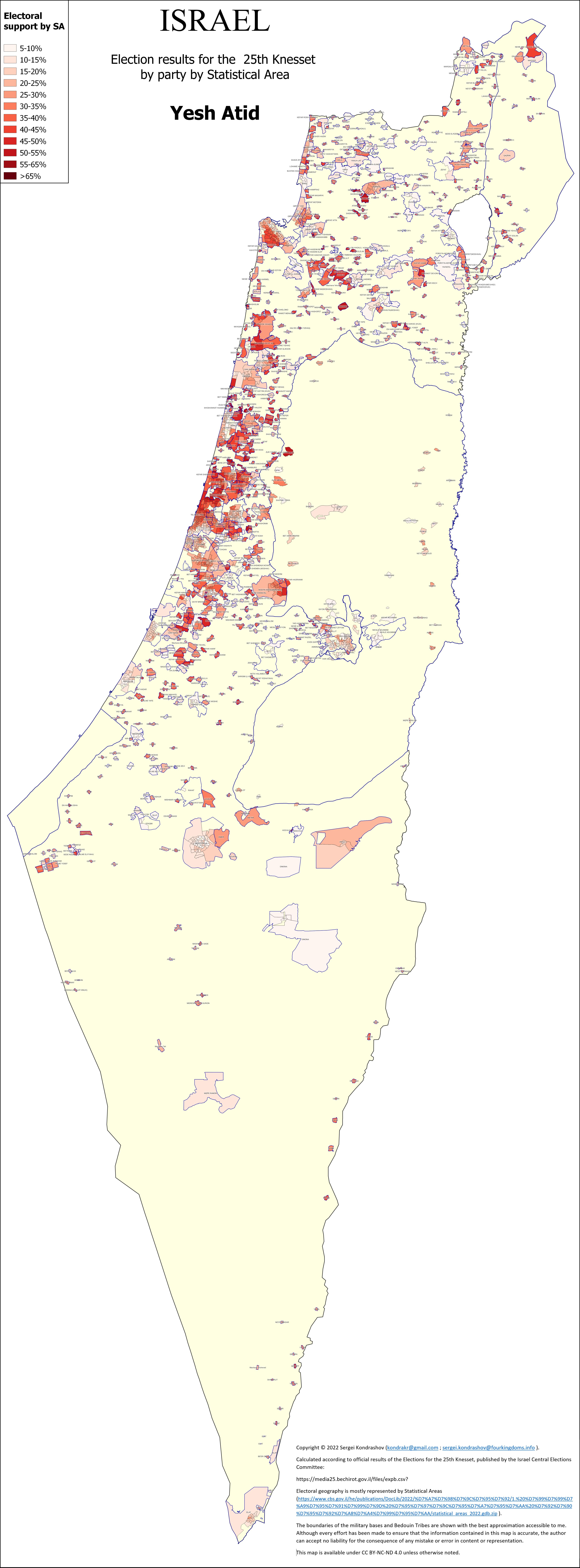
Electoral support for the Yesh Atid Party in the elections to the 25th Knesset

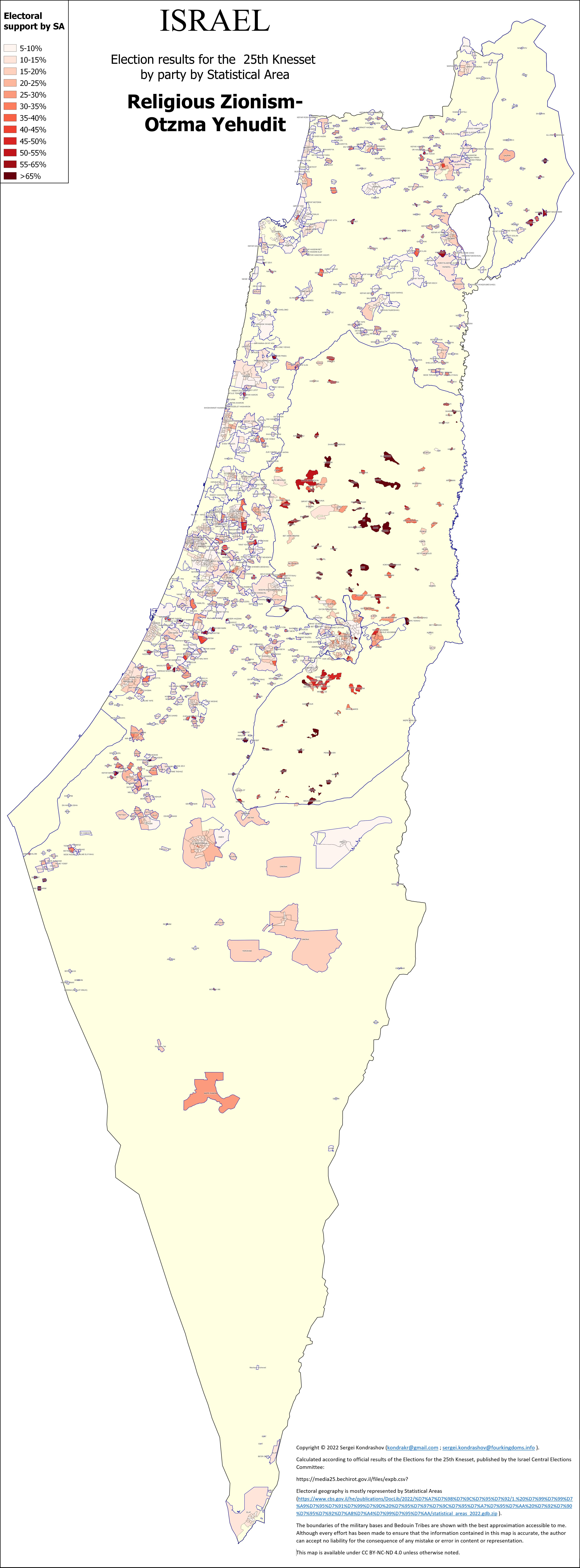
Electoral support for the Religious Zionism-Otzma Yehudit joint list in the elections to the 25th Knesset

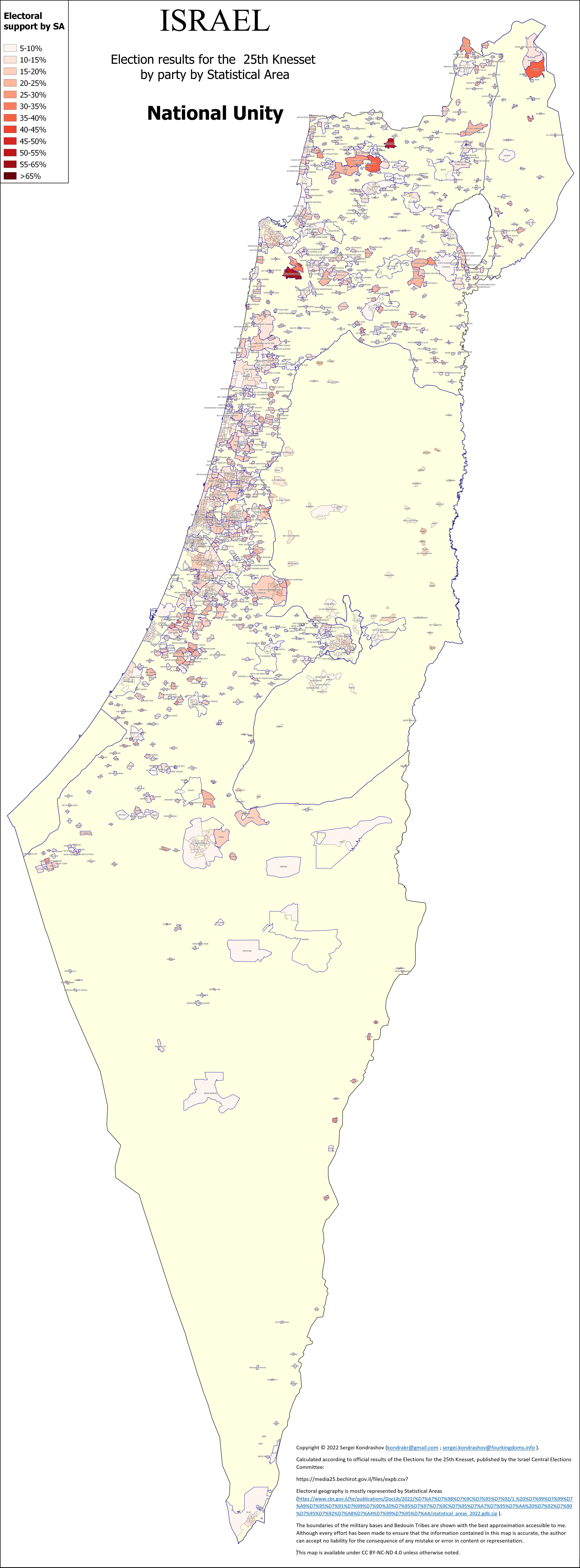
Electoral support for the National Unity Party in the elections to the 25th Knesset

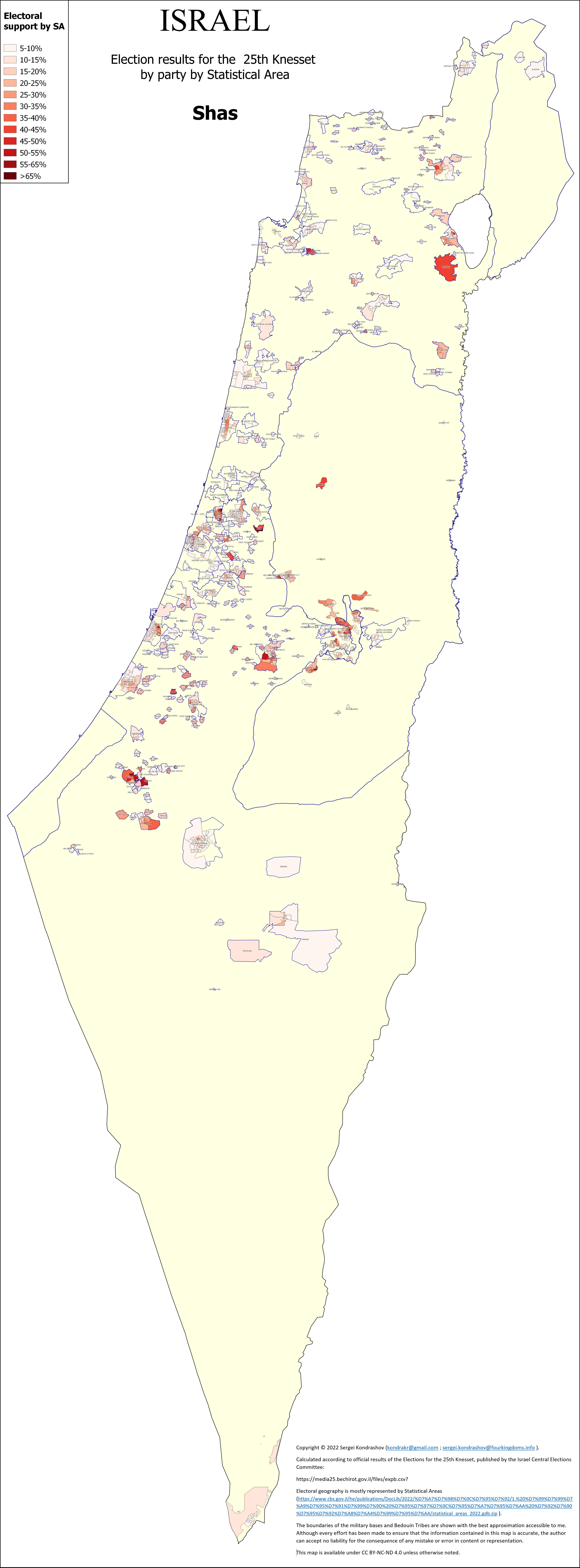
Electoral support for the Shas Party in the elections to the 25th Knesset

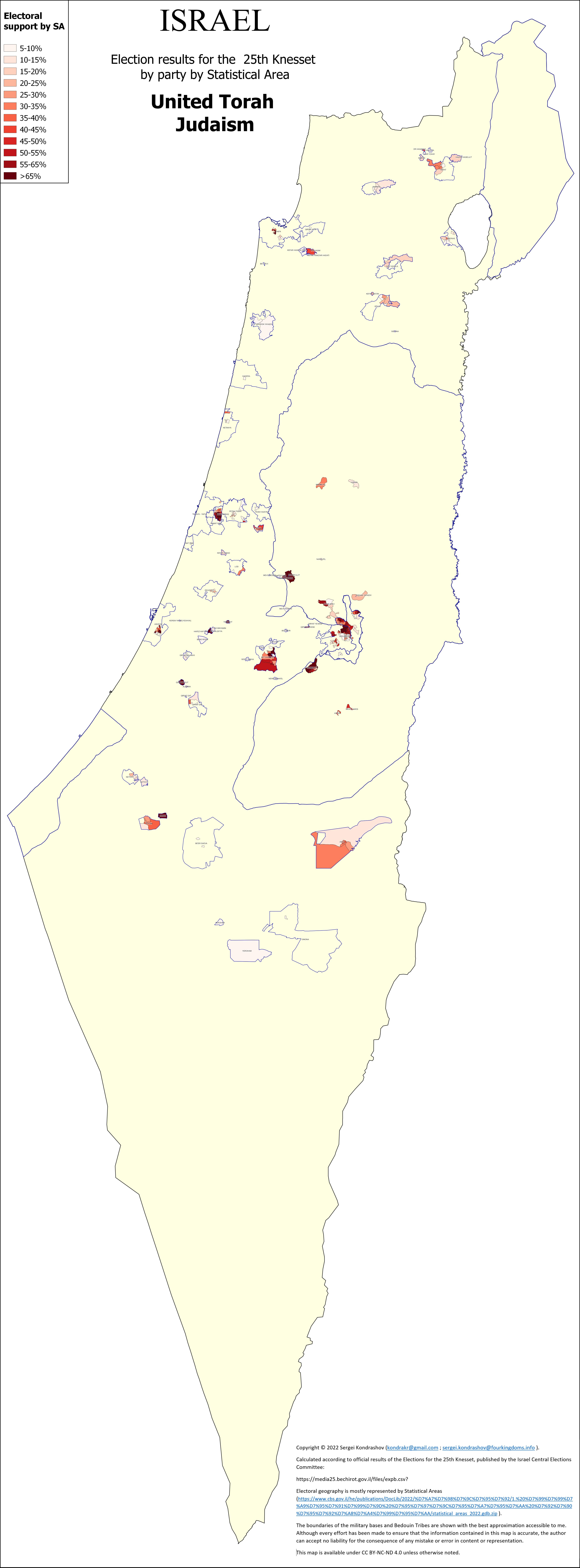
Electoral support for the United Torah Judaism alliance in the elections to the 25th Knesset

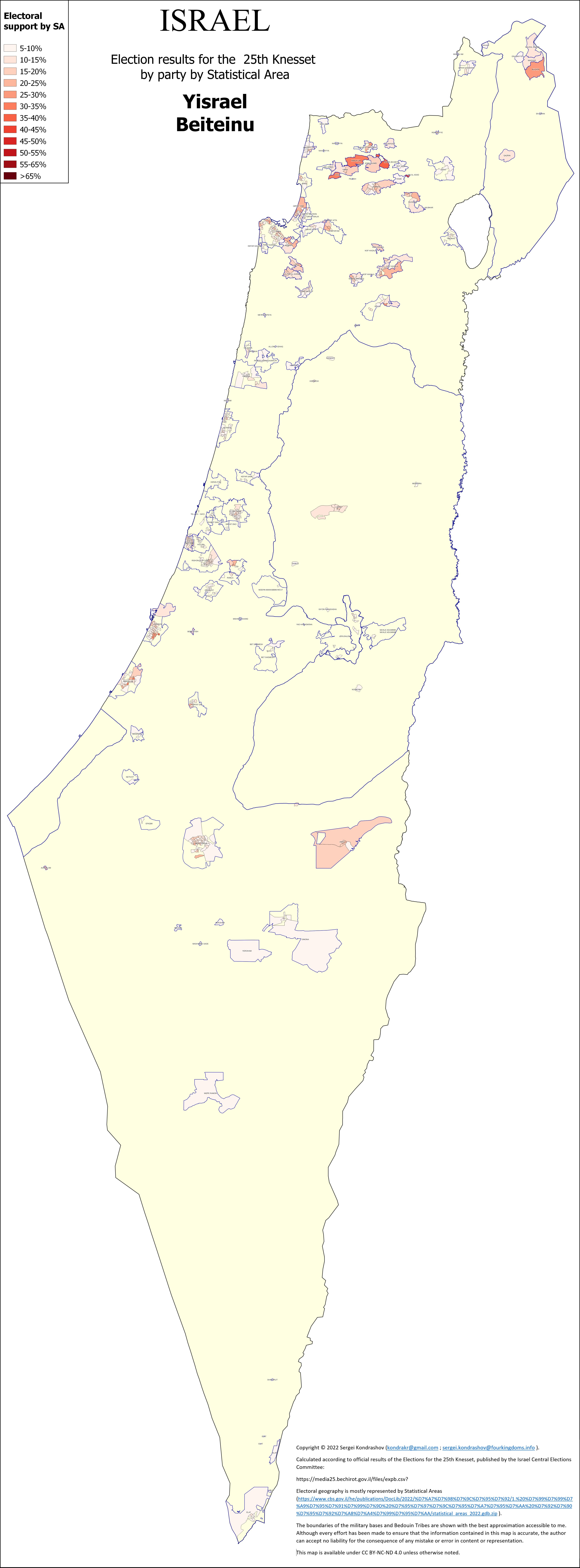
Electoral support for the Yisrael Beiteinu Party in the elections to the 25th Knesset

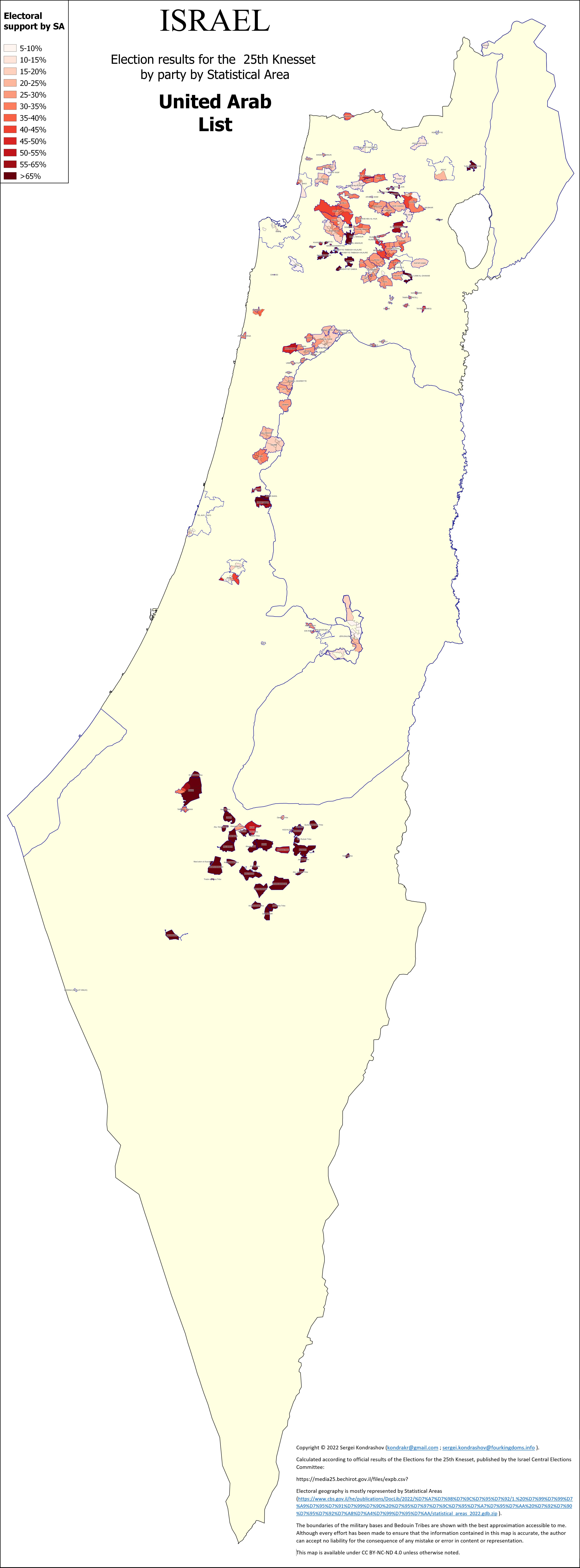
Electoral support for Ra'am in the elections to the 25th Knesset

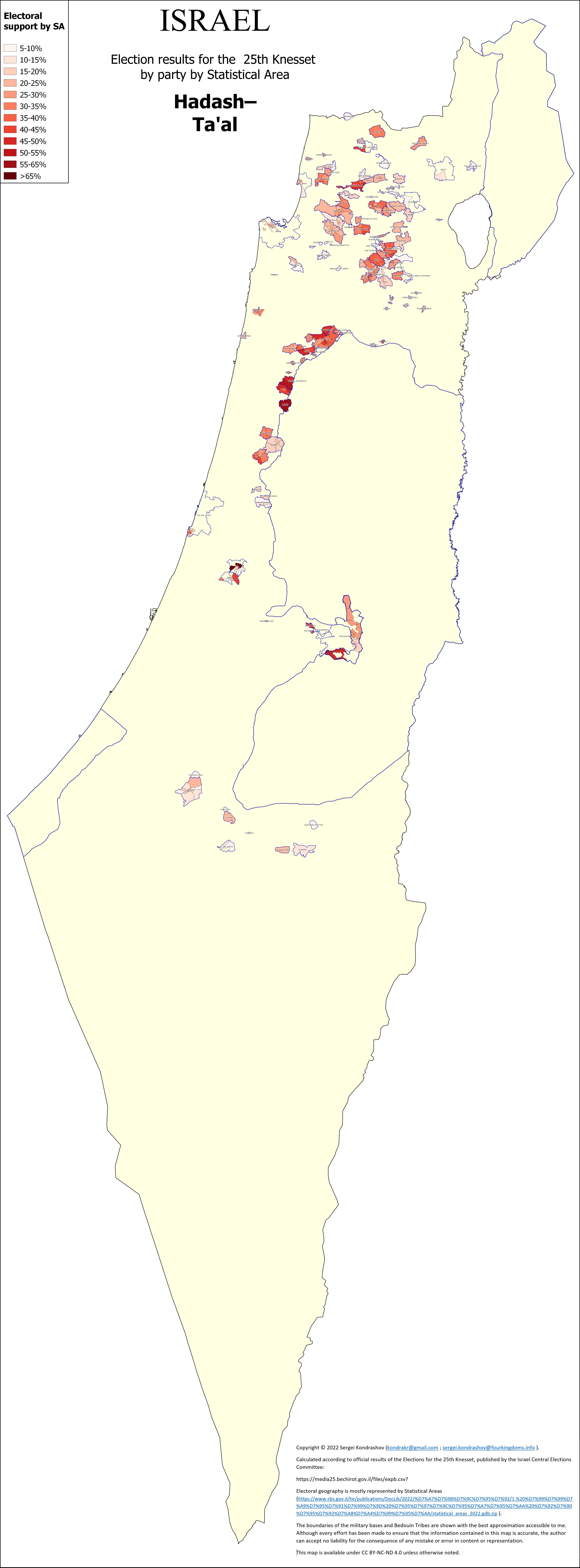
Electoral support for the Hadash-Ta'al joint list in the elections to the 25th Knesset

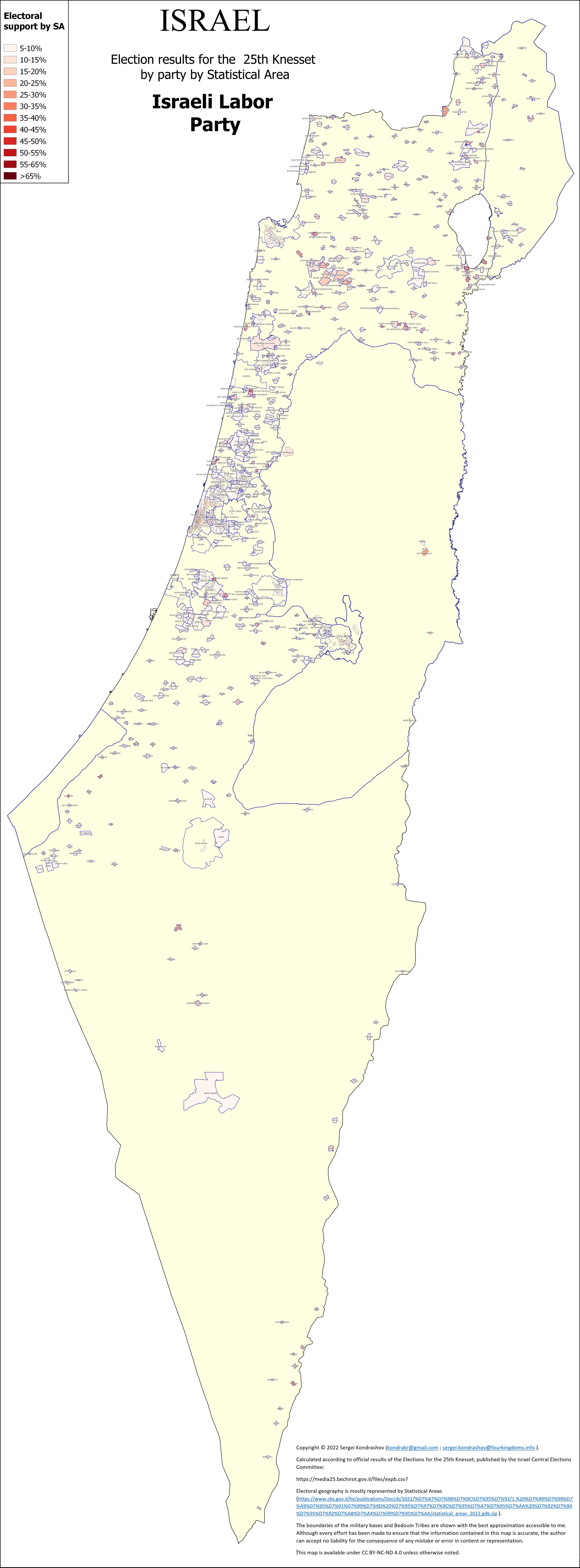
Electoral support for the Israel Labor Party in the elections to the 25th Knesset

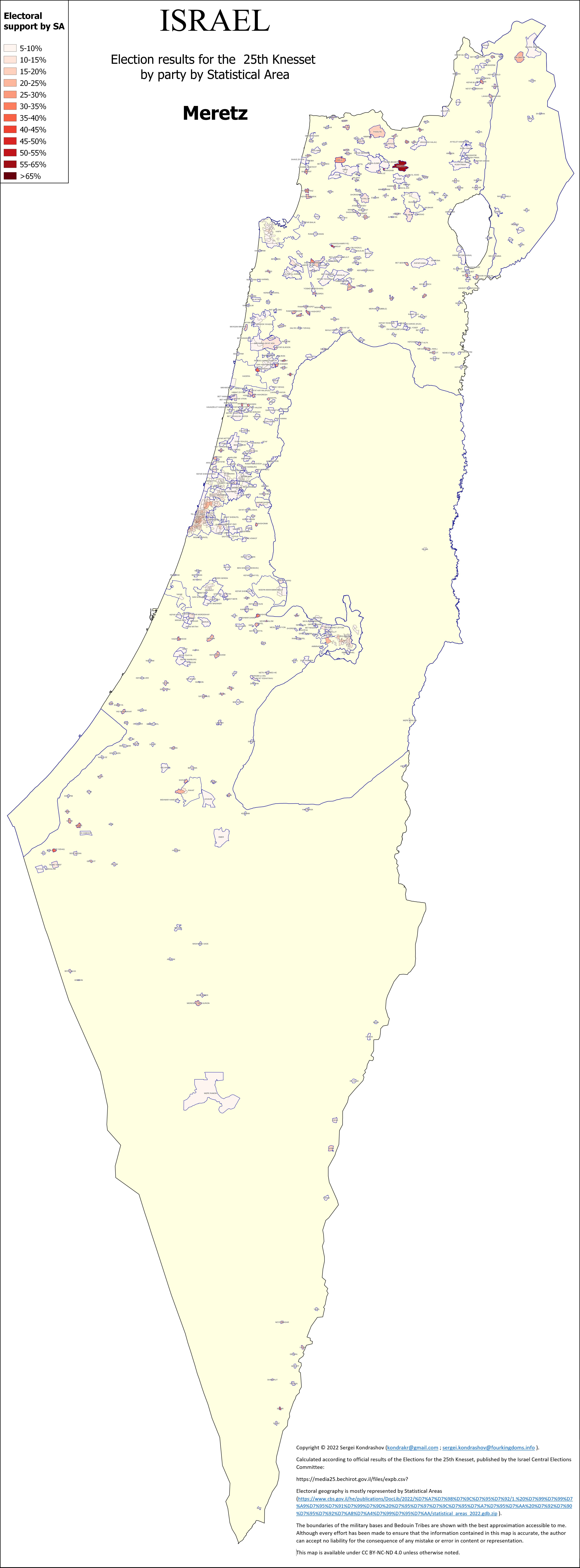
Electoral support for the Meretz party in the elections to the 25th Knesset

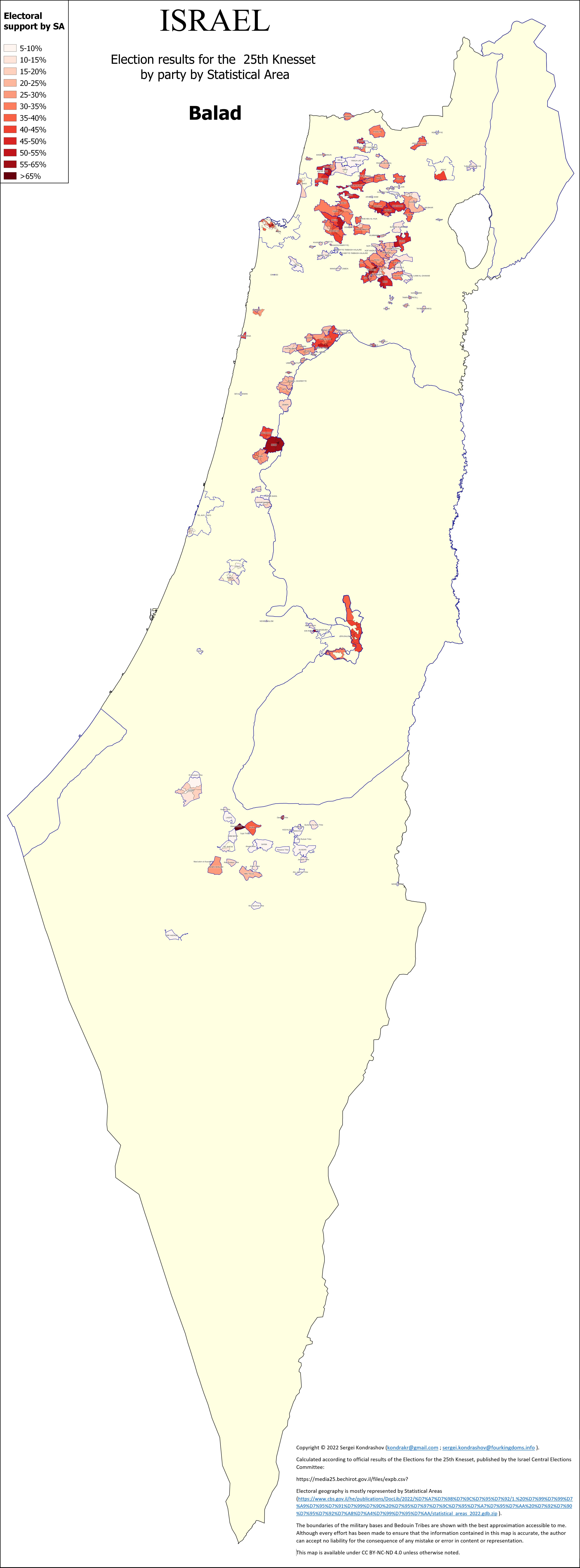
Electoral support for the Balad party in the elections to the 25th Knesset

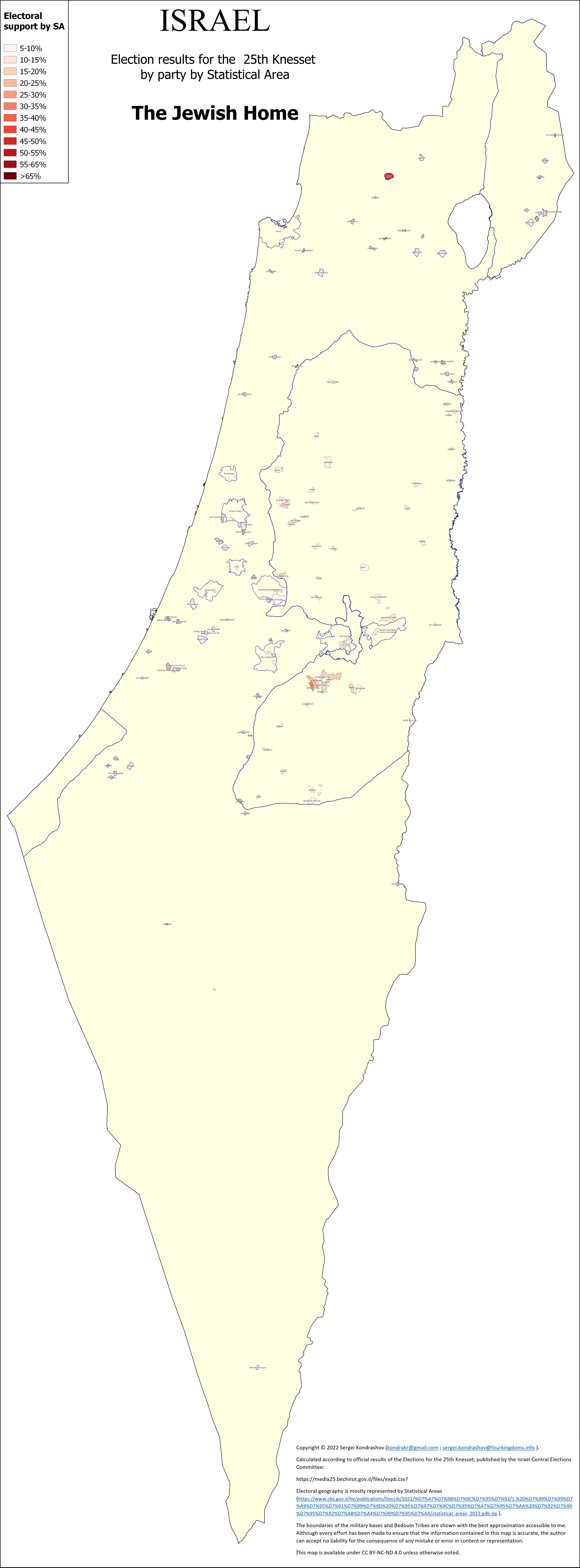
Electoral support for the Jewish Home Party in the elections to the 25th Knesset

== Aftermath ==
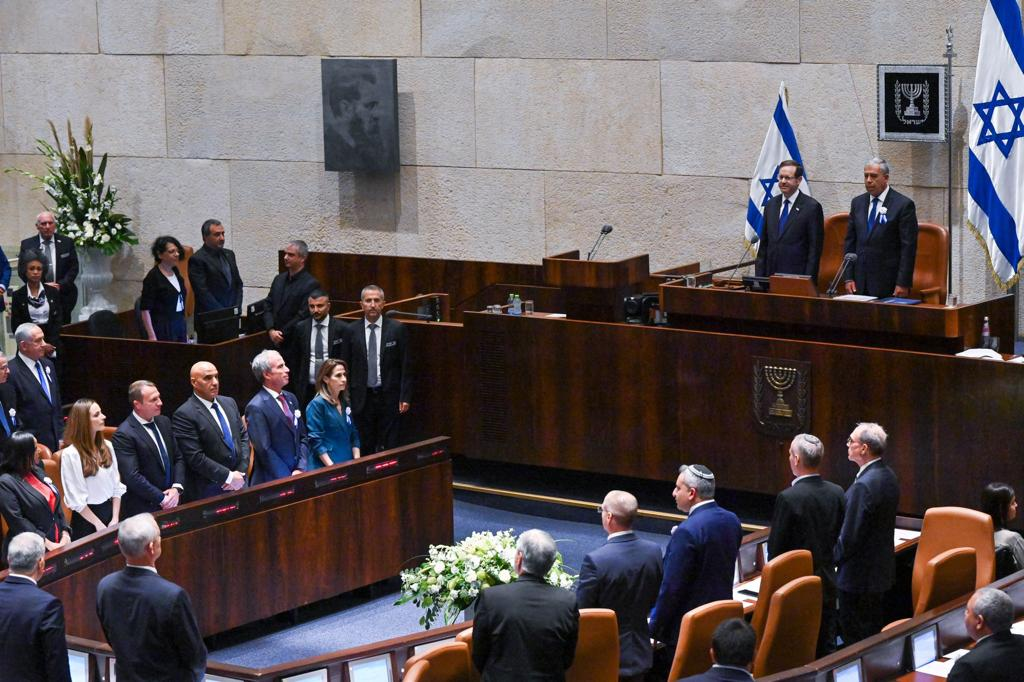
The swearing-in ceremony of the members of the newly elected 25th Knesset, 15 November 2022.

With 86% of the vote counted, the right-wing bloc led by Benjamin Netanyahu, known in Israel as the national camp, was forecast to win a majority of seats at 65, while both leftist Meretz and Balad parties were under the electoral threshold. As all the votes were counted, they remained under the threshold; far-right parties saw a surge in their vote share. In terms of votes, both blocs were neck-and-neck, with the anti-Netanyahu bloc achieving 49.5% but not gaining enough seats due to Meretz and Balad narrowly missing the electoral threshold, as 289,000 anti-Netanyahu votes went wasted in terms of seats share. Orly Ades, head of Israel's election panel Central Elections Committee, said Netanyahu's party Likud tried to undermine voting supervision, and described their actions as "something we've never seen before".

Netanyahu's bloc went on to win 64 seats, while the coalition led by the incumbent prime minister Yair Lapid won 51 seats. In addition to Meretz and Balad, the right-wing party The Jewish Home also failed to cross the electoral threshold. The new majority was variously described as the most right-wing government in Israeli history, as well as its most religious government.

Lapid conceded to Netanyahu, and congratulated him, wishing him luck "for the sake of the Israeli people". Netanyahu received congratulatory messages from leaders around the world, including those of Canada, France, Hungary, India, Italy, Jordan, Sudan, Ukraine, the United Arab Emirates, the United States, and the United Kingdom, among others.

On 15 November, the swearing-in ceremony for the newly elected members of the 25th Knesset was held during the opening session. The incoming Knesset includes 29 female lawmakers, 7 less than the last Knesset, and 28 new parliamentarians. The vote to appoint a new Speaker of the Knesset, which is usually conducted at the opening session, and the swearing in of cabinet members were postponed since ongoing coalition negotiations had not yet resulted in agreement on these positions.

The vote to replace incumbent Knesset speaker Mickey Levy was scheduled for 13 December, after Likud and its allies secured the necessary number of signatures for it. Yariv Levin of Likud was elected as a temporary speaker by 64 votes, while his opponents Meirav Ben-Ari of Yesh Atid and Ayman Odeh of Hadash got 45 and five votes respectively. He resigned on 29 December and Amir Ohana of Likud was elected as the speaker by 63 votes.

=== Government formation ===
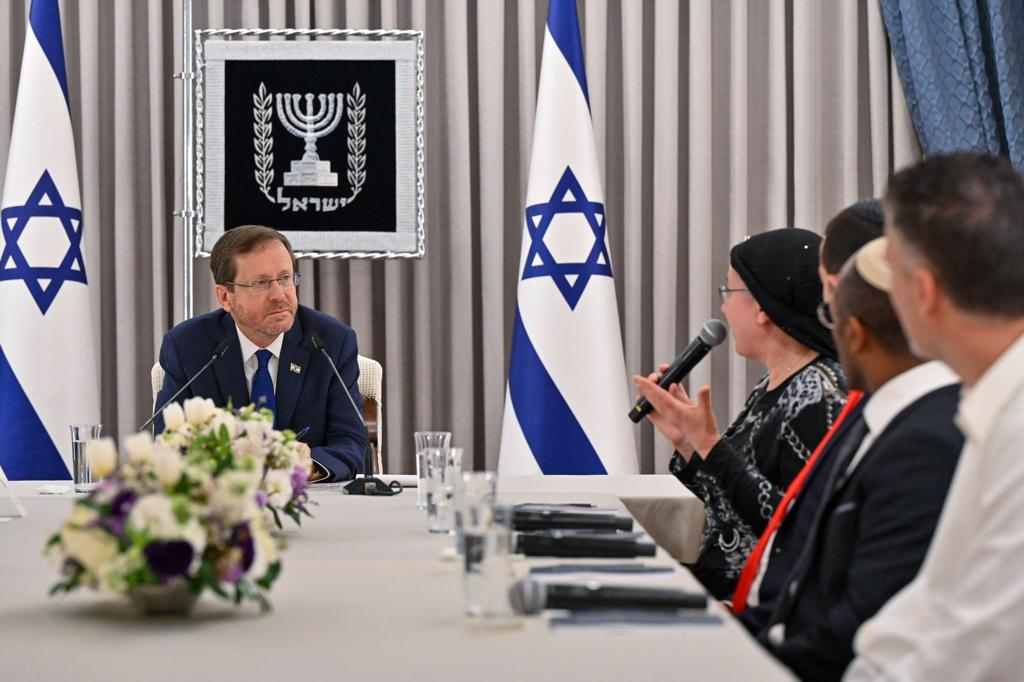
President Herzog consulting with MKs Orit Strook, Ohad Tal and Moshe Solomon ahead of nominating a prime minister-designate, 10 November 2022.

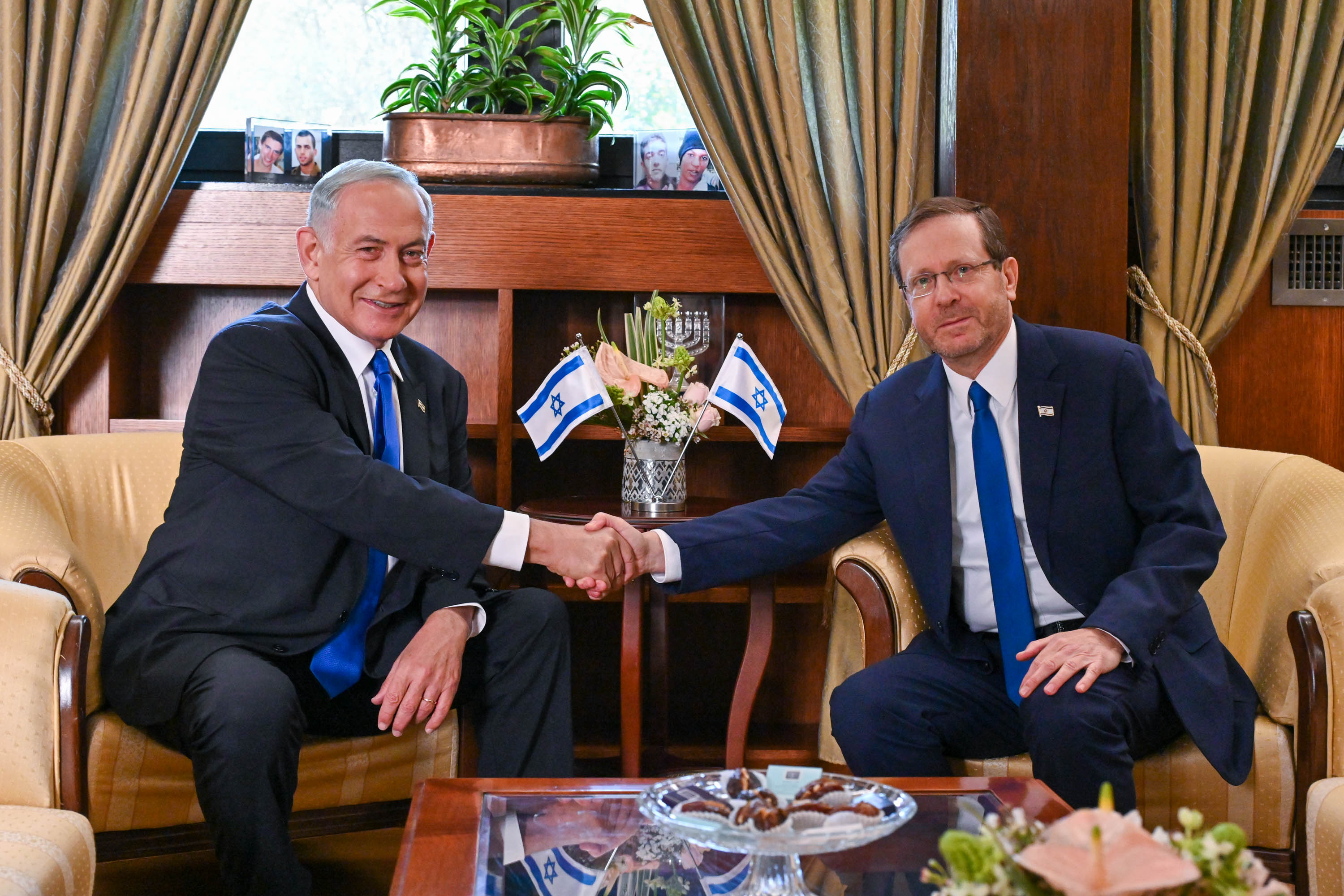
President Herzog assigns the task of forming a new government to Likud leader, Benjamin Netanyahu, 13 November 2022.

On 3 November 2022 Netanyahu told his aide Yariv Levin to begin informal coalition talks with allied parties after 97% of the vote was counted.

Netanyahu himself started holding talks on 6 November. He first met with Moshe Gafni, the leader of the Degel HaTorah faction of United Torah Judaism, and then with Yitzhak Goldknopf, the leader of the United Torah Judaism alliance and its Agudat Yisrael faction. Meanwhile, the Religious Zionist Party leader Bezalel Smotrich and the leader of its Otzma Yehudit faction Itamar Ben-Gvir pledged that they would not enter the coalition without the other faction. Gafni later met with Smotrich for coalition talks. Smotrich then met with Netanyahu. On 7 November, Netanyahu met with Ben-Gvir. A major demand from the UTJ was that the Knesset be allowed to override the rulings of the Supreme Court. Netanyahu met with the Noam faction leader and its sole MK Avi Maoz on 8 November.

President Isaac Herzog began consultations with heads of all political parties on 9 November after the election results were certified. Shas met with Likud for coalition talks on 10 November. By 11 November, Netanyahu had secured recommendations from 64 MKs, which constituted a majority. He was given the mandate to form the thirty-seventh government of Israel by President Herzog on 13 November. Otzma Yehudit and Noam officially split from Religious Zionism on 20 November as per a pre-election agreement.

Likud signed a coalition agreement with Otzma Yehudit on 25 November, with Noam on 27 November, the Religious Zionist Party on 1 December, United Torah Judaism on 6 December, and with Shas on 8 December.

Netanyahu asked Herzog for a 14-day extension after the agreement with Shas in order to finalise the roles his allied parties would play. Herzog on 9 December extended the deadline to 21 December. On that date, Netanyahu informed Herzog that he had succeeded in forming a coalition. The coalition government was sworn in on 29 December.

=== Satisfaction with results ===
At the end of November and the beginning of December, the Israel Democracy Institute polled Israelis on their satisfaction with the results of the election. 43% were found to be satisfied, 52% unsatisfied, and 5% were undecided.

== See also ==
- 2022 in Israel
- List of elections in 2022
