= Committees of the Knesset =

Committees of Israel's legislature

Committees of the Knesset (Hebrew: ועדות הכנסת) operate within the Knesset and are its subsidiary institutions entrusted with specific matters.

The committees are an important executive arm of the Knesset's work and are structured in the form of the party power relations of the Knesset composition. The purpose of their establishment is to reduce the workload of debates in the plenum and to enable closer supervision and monitoring of focused areas of action.

== Structure and role ==
The standing committees and their chairs are elected at the beginning of each Knesset session, after the elections in Israel. it is based on the recommendation of the Organizing Committee. According to the law, the Knesset will elect, as soon as possible after its election, an organizing committee; the organizing committee will be headed by a member of the Knesset from the faction of the member of the Knesset to whom the president of Israel has assigned the task of forming a government. Representation on the organizing committee will be based on the relative size of the elected parties.

The establishment of Knesset committees is influenced by the identity of the incumbent government, since in a parliamentary system, a majority of the coalition in the Knesset committees is required in order for the government to pass its decisions. The Knesset has 12 standing committees, the most prominent of which are the Foreign Affairs and Defense Committee and the Finance Committee. There are also special committees, which are valid only for the term of the Knesset that appointed them. The factions determine who from their party will serve as committee chairperson, with opposition MKs also serving as committee heads.

The chairpersons of the Foreign Affairs and Defense Committee and the Finance Committee are usually from a coalition parliamentary group, and the chairperson of the State Control Committee is always from the opposition. The coalition has a majority in almost all the committees, and committee members are usually subject to party discipline during votes.

Membership in the committees is based on factionalism. The committees discuss bills after they have passed an early reading at the Knesset and a first vote in the case of a bill proposed by a member of Knesset, or a first vote in the case of a bill proposed by the Cabinet of Israel, and prepare them for the next stages of legislation. Sometimes a bill returns to the committee even after a second vote, if reservations were received in this reading. The committees may also initiate legislation. In addition to their role in legislation, the committees are a key tool for the legislative branch to oversee the executive branch.

In addition, the committees discuss proposals for the agenda that are forwarded to them, regulations that require their approval, requests from citizens submitted to the Knesset or the government, and any issue that the Knesset decides to refer to them.

According to Section 22 of Basic Law: The Knesset, the Knesset also has the constitutional authority to appoint parliamentary inquiry committees to examine matters that it considers to be of special national importance; the Knesset may also appoint one of its standing committees to assume such a role. The Knesset determines the powers and roles of a parliamentary inquiry committee, and its members are appointed in accordance with the relative size of the parliamentary groups in the Knesset.

Four new committees were created in 2021. The Interior and Environmental Protection Committee was split into three new committees: the "Committee of the Interior and Environmental Protection", the "Committee of Internal Security" and "the Committee on Special National Infrastructure Initiatives and Jewish Religious Services", while the Labor, Health and Welfare Committee was split into the Health Committee and the Labor and Welfare Committee.

== Standing committees ==
- House Committee
- Finance Committee
- Economic Affairs Committee
- Foreign Affairs and Defense Committee
- National Security Committee
- Internal Affairs and Environment Committee
- Constitution, Law and Justice Committee
- Committee for Immigration, Absorption and Diaspora Affairs
- Committee for Special National Infrastructure Projects and Jewish Religious Services
- Education, Culture, and Sports Committee
- Labor and Welfare Committee
- State Control Committee
- Committee on the Status of Women
- Science and Technology Committee
- Health Committee
- Committee on Public Projects
