= List of ambassadors of Israel to Mauritania =

== List of ambassadors ==
- Feredi Eitan 1998 - 2001
- Ariel Kerem 2002 - 2003
- Boaz Bismuth 2004 - 2008
- Michael Arbel 2008 - 2009.

== See also ==
- Israel–Mauritania relations
