= Zvika Fogel =

Israeli politician and former military officer

- צְבִיקָה פוֹגֶל
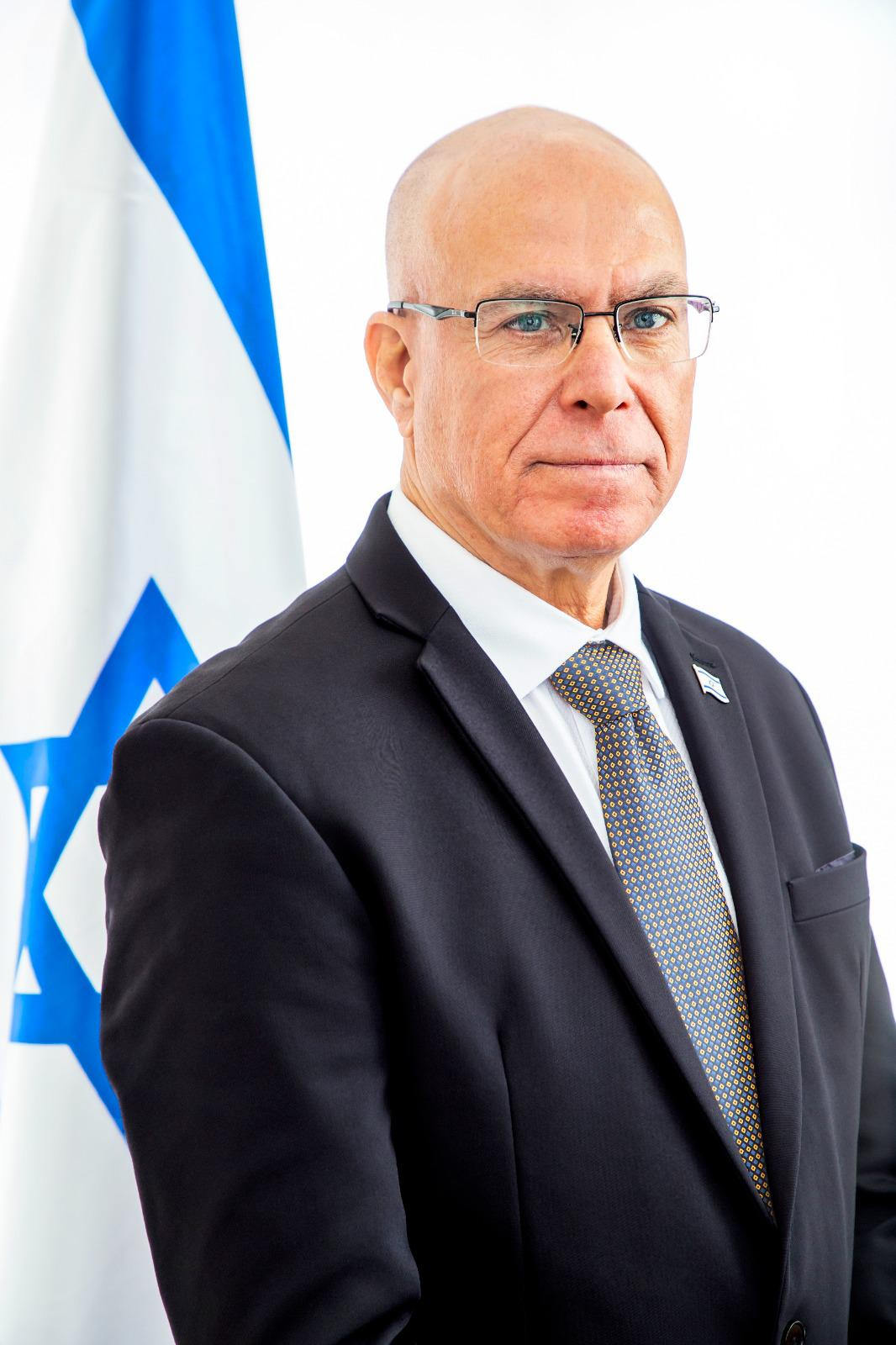

Faction represented in the Knesset
- 2022–2026: Otzma Yehudit

Other offices held
- 2003–2005: Councillor, Beersheba City Council
- 2007–2008: Councillor, Tuba-Zangariyye Local Council
- 2008–2012: Head, Tuba-Zangariyye Local Council

Personal details
- Born: November 3, 1956 (age 70) Beersheba, Israel
- Spouse: Anat Fogel (m. 1982)
- Children: 3
- Education: Beit Yerah High School; Tel Aviv University; B.A. (general history); M.A. (organizational behavior)
- Occupation: Politician, military commentator Former military officer, organizational consultant

Military service
- Allegiance: Israel
- Branch/service: Israel Defense Forces
- Years of service: 1975–1979, 1981–2003, 2005–2012
- Rank: Brigadier General (Res.)
- Unit: Northern Command; Southern Command
- Battles/wars: 1982 Lebanon War; South Lebanon Conflict; Operation Accountability; Operation Grapes of Wrath; Second Intifada; Operation Defensive Shield; Operation Cast Lead; Operation Pillar of Defense

Zvika Fogel or Tzvika Foghel (Hebrew: צְבִיקָה פוֹגֶל; born 3 November 1956) is an Israeli politician, activist and former military officer who served as a member of Knesset for Otzma Yehudit from 2022 to 2026.

== Biography ==
Fogel was born on 3 November 1956 in Beersheba to the Romanian Ashkenazi couple of Haim and Dietza Fogel and grew up with a brother. He moved to Kvutzat Kinneret during the 9th grade of his schooling and studied at the Beit Yerah High School.

After completing his military service, Fogel studied law at the Tel Aviv University for two years, but left the course in order to return to the army in 1981. He married Anat Fogel in 1982 and the two are parents of three sons. Fogel completed a Bachelor of Arts degree in general history, and his Master of Arts in organizational behavior. He moved to Safed in 2007, following which he worked as an organizational consultant in Netanya and Petah Tikva.

Since 2010 he has voluntarily commanded the Golan Rescue Unit of the Israel Police and helped rescue people during the 2010 Mount Carmel forest fire. He also serves as the vice-chairman of the Firefighters' Association of the Eastern Galilee and the Golan. He currently lives in Mishmar HaYarden and also works as a military commentator.

== Military career ==
Fogel enlisted in a pilot course for the Israel Defense Forces (IDF) in 1975, but did not finish the course and eventually became an officer in the Artillery Corps. He completed his service in 1979, but rejoined the IDF in 1981 and remained an officer in the army until retiring in 2003 with the rank of tat aluf (brigadier general).

Fogel commanded an artillery battery during the 1982 Lebanon War, and led the 334th Artillery Battalion during Operation Accountability in 1993 while serving as a colonel in the Northern Command. The unit created a flow of refugees from Southern Lebanon in order to pressure the Lebanese government to prevent rocket attacks by Hezbollah on Israel. As part of Operation Grapes of Wrath in 1996, he commanded the 282nd Artillery Brigade.

During his tenure Fogel also commanded the "David's Sling" brigade and served as the chief of staff to Doron Almog of the Southern Command. During the outbreak of the Second Intifada in 2000, he along with Yom-Tov Samia recommended fortifying IDF outposts in the Gaza Strip. During Operation Defensive Shield and another military operation in 2003, Fogel advised doubling the deployment of IDF troops to avoid being outmanoeuvred.

Fogel later approached Yoav Gallant in 2005 to set up the position of an "artillery coordinator" in all three divisions of the IDF, with all the weapons except small arms and tanks being stored in one place. Gallant agreed and Fogel was initially re-enlisted for 6 months as a reservist. He helped set up and was assigned to the position of Artillery Coordinator for the Southern Command in late 2008. During Operation Cast Lead from 2008 to 2009, Fogel coordinated and oversaw all bombardments by the Southern Command on the Gaza Strip.

In March 2009, he admitted to Reuters that Israeli tactics to protect soldiers in Operation Cast Lead caused deaths of innocent Palestinian civilians during the conflict, but stated that such incidents were rare. He also served as the artillery coordinator during Operation Pillar of Defense in 2012. In a 2018 interview with the Israeli Public Broadcasting Corporation, Fogel confirmed that IDF snipers were authorized to shoot Palestinian teenagers on the border with Gaza Strip by their commanders.

== Political career ==
In the 2003 Israeli municipal elections, Fogel ran as a mayoral candidate for Beersheba as an independent candidate with the support of the Shinui party. He came in the third place in the elections and served on the city council until 2005.

After moving to Safed in late 2007, he was appointed by the Ministry of Interior to serve as the head of the Tuba-Zangariyye Council, after the elected council was dissolved due to procedural mismanagement. Fogel rejected the position, but accepted the offer of becoming a member of the town council instead.

He assumed the position of the head of the Tuba-Zangariyye Council in August 2008 after a year of being pressured by the Interior Minister Meir Sheetrit. During his tenure, he helped in improving the educational standard in the town and increasing the collection of municipal tax from 37% to 70%. In September 2009 he was attacked by unknown gunmen, but escaped unharmed. Fogel decided to resign in January 2012, months after a riot due to an arson at a town mosque committed by Jewish extremists.

In August 2017 Fogel announced that he was running for the position of the head of the Mevo'ot HaHermon Regional Council as part of the 2018 Israeli municipal elections. However he withdrew his candidacy in September 2018.

In 2020, he joined the Israel Defense and Security Forum which advocates for the annexation of the Jordan Valley. He has supported shooting any Arab who throws stones at an IDF soldier, while being lenient towards Jews who do the same.

He joined the Otzma Yehudit party in September 2022 and was placed tenth on the combined Religious Zionist Party-Otzma Yehudit list for the 2022 Israeli legislative election. He became an MK following the election.

In an interview with British broadcaster Channel 4 in December 2022, Fogel stated that Israel was too "merciful" towards Palestinians and "the concept of proportionality should cease to exist." He further asserted that "if it is [to choose between] one Israeli mother crying, or a thousand Palestinian mothers crying, then a thousand Palestinian mothers will cry."

Fogel was first appointed to the Knesset 's National Security Committee in February 2023, though he briefly left the position in February 2025 after Otzma Yehudit left the government, and was replaced by Boaz Bismuth. That May, Fogel was reinstated in the position, as Otzma Yehudit returned to the government.

In February 2023, Fogel announced his support for reprisal attacks against Palestinian villages in retaliation for terror attacks. Speaking in favor of settler violence targeting the Palestinian town of Huwara, Fogel stated that, "A closed, burnt Huwara — that's what I want to see. That's the only way to achieve deterrence. After a murder like yesterday's, we need burning villages when the IDF doesn't act." Fogel also stated, "We need to stop shying away from collective punishment."

During the Gaza War, Fogel called for the ethnic cleansing of the Gaza Strip, saying that there should not be a single Palestinian left in Gaza at the end of the war.

Fogel announced in September 2026 that he would not run in the 2026 Israeli legislative election after being placed in an unrealistic slot on the party's electoral list.
