= Finance Committee (Israel) =

The Finance Committee (Hebrew: ועדת הכספים) is a permanent Knesset committee which oversees finance issues of the State of Israel, including the drafting of legislation, supervision over related government ministries and the approval of their budgets. It is regarded as one of two most important Knesset committees (the other being the Foreign Affairs and Defense Committee). Article 100(2) of the Knesset's Rules of Procedure states that its areas of concern are "the state budget; taxes of all kinds; customs and excise duties; loans; currency and foreign exchange matters; banking and banknotes; state revenues and expenditures."

== Activity ==
The finance committee is considered one of the most important and influential committees in the Knesset and has great political weight. The committee deals, among other things, with the state budget, taxes of all kinds, banking, banknotes, and state revenues and expenditures.

The committee discusses the state budget and prepares them for second and third voting in the Knesset plenum. It has the ability to have a far-reaching influence on the composition of the budget, which includes, among other things, transferring financial support to various sectors and bodies. The committee also discusses economic laws, and in particular tax laws.

== Chairs ==
Portrait	Chair	Took office	Left office	Party	Ref.
Eli Goldschmidt	Eli Goldschmidt (born 1953)	?	2001	One Israel	
Avraham Hirschson	Avraham Hirschson (1941–2022)	2003	?	Likud	
Yaakov Litzman	Yaakov Litzman (born 1948)	?	2007	UTJ	
Stas Misezhnikov	Stas Misezhnikov (born 1969)	2007	2008	Yisrael Beiteinu	
Avishay Braverman	Avishay Braverman (born 1948)	2008		Labor	
Nissan Slomiansky	Nissan Slomiansky (born 1946)	2013		Jewish Home	
Moshe Gafni	Moshe Gafni (born 1952)	2020	2021	UTJ	
Alex Kushnir	Alex Kushnir (born 1978)	2021	2022	Yisrael Beiteinu	
Moshe Gafni	Moshe Gafni (born 1952)	2022	2025	UTJ	
Ofir Katz	Ofir Katz (born 1980)	2025	2025	Likud	
Hanoch Milwidsky	Hanoch Milwidsky (born 1973)	2025	2026	Likud	
Liran Avishar Ben-Horin	Liran Avishar Ben-Horin (born 1976)	2026	Incumbent	Together	

== Subcommittees ==
The finance committee has subcommittees, which change from time to time. The committee also has joint committees with other committees. Below is a list of the subcommittees and joint committees of the Finance Committee in the 25th Knesset:

- Subcommittee on Supervision of Financial Services Providers in the Capital Markets
- Joint Committee of the Foreign Affairs and Defense Committee and the Finance Committee on the Defense Budget
- Joint Committee of the Knesset Committee and the Finance Committee on the Knesset Budget under the Budget Foundations Law
