= National Security Committee (Israel) =

Permanent Knesset committee

The National Security Committee, also known as the Public Security Committee, is a permanent Knesset committee, which was first formed in August 2021.

== Chairs ==
Portrait	Chair	Took office	Left office	Party	Ref.
Meirav Ben-Ari	Meirav Ben-Ari (born 1975)	2021	2022	Yesh Atid	
Zvika Fogel	Zvika Fogel (born 1956)	2023	2025	Otzma Yehudit	
Boaz Bismuth	Boaz Bismuth (born 1964)	2025	2025	Likud	
Zvika Fogel	Zvika Fogel (born 1956)	2025		Otzma Yehudit	
