= 2008 Nouakchott Israeli embassy attack =

Terrorist attack by Al-Qaeda in the Islamic Maghreb (AQIM)

- Part of the Insurgency in the Maghreb (2002–present)
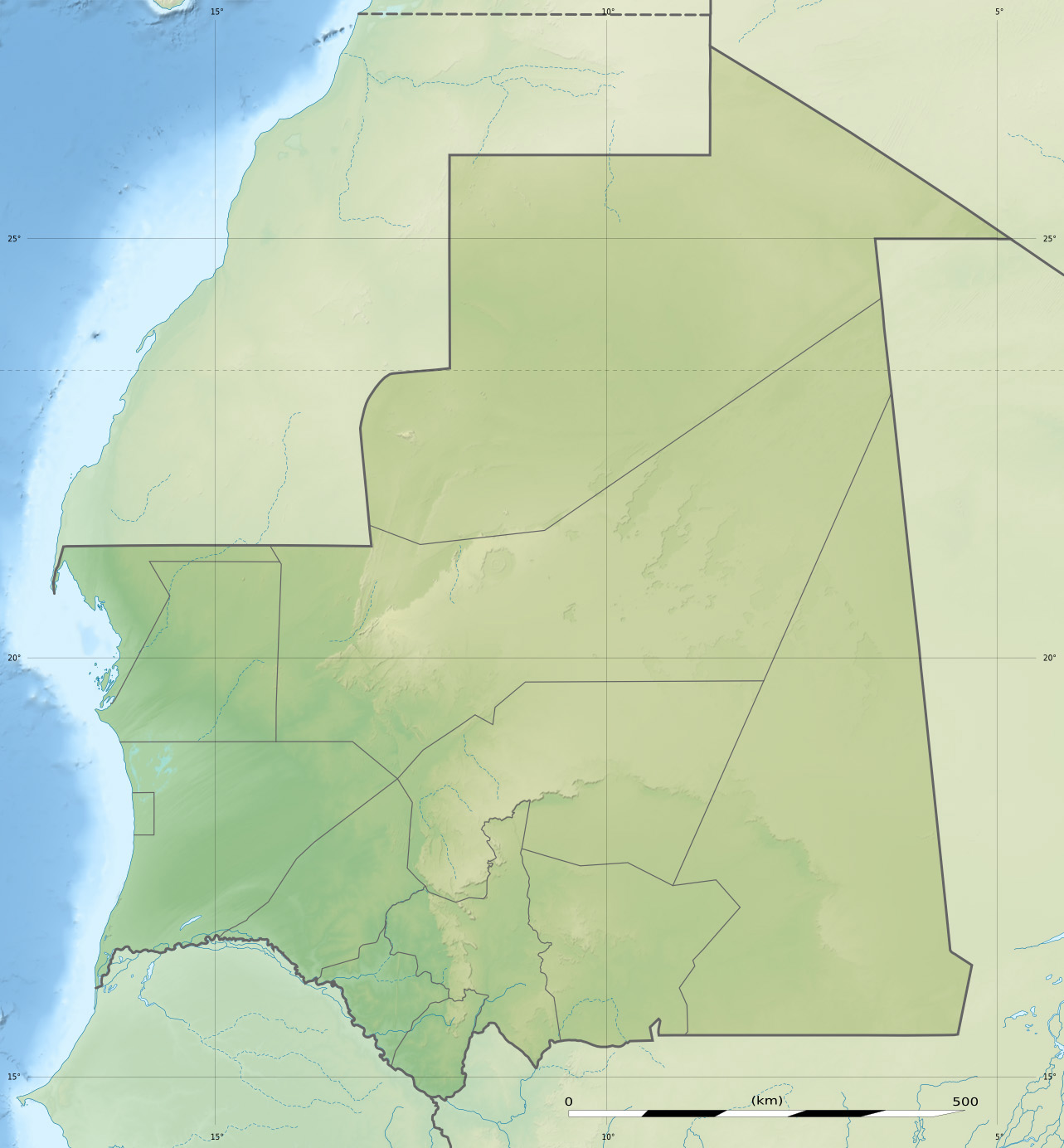
- Attack location (Mauritania)
- Location: 18°06′08.4″N 15°58′34.1″W
- Date: February 1, 2008; 18 years ago 2:20 a.m. (UTC)
- Target: Embassy of Israel
- Attack type: Shooting, bombing
- Weapons: Guns; Hand grenades
- Deaths: 0
- Injuries: 3
- Perpetrator: Al-Qaeda in the Islamic Maghreb (AQIM)
- Motive: Islamic extremism, anti-Israeli sentiment

On 1 February 2008, at least three gunmen who allegedly belonged to the Islamic terrorist group Al-Qaeda in the Islamic Maghreb opened fire outside the Israeli embassy in Nouakchott, the capital of Mauritania. Armed with rifles and grenades, they injured three bystanders. Eight suspects were later arrested.

== Attack ==
On 1 February 2008, several unidentified gunmen attacked the Israeli embassy in Nouakchott, the capital of Mauritania, in a gun and grenade attack. At 2:20 a.m. local time, between three and six gunmen dressed in turbans and robes approached the embassy building on foot after being dropped off by a car at a close by nightclub and opened fire, shouting "Allahu akbar." Mauritanian embassy guards posted at the embassy quickly returned fire. Although the overall attack had an "inconsequential" impact, the ensuing gunfight injured three bystanders including a French woman at the nearby nightclub. The attackers then escaped in a vehicle.

In a statement titled "At your orders, Gaza," the extremist group Al-Qaeda in the Islamic Maghreb claimed responsibility for the attack and personally threatened the Israeli ambassador. According to the United States-based IntelCenter, one of Al-Qaeda's top commanders Ayman al-Zawahri had called for attacks on the Israeli ambassador in 2007. The attack was the latest in a string of violence to impact the country, coming just after the murder of four French tourists, and an attack that killed in three Mauritanian troops in December 2007.

== Aftermath ==
The next day, Mauritanian authorities announced they had detained three suspects approximately 150 kilometers (93 miles) from the capital. On 8 February, it was announced that eight people, including an Algerian national, had been arrested in connection to the attack. In response to the attack, Israeli embassies worldwide were placed on a heightened security alert and an Israeli defense official was dispatched to Mauritania to evaluate the embassy's security. The Israeli Ambassador to Mauritania Boaz Bismuth stated on radio: "The opposition savagely attacked Israel because of the situation in Gaza. The media criticized Israel blatantly and exaggeratedly."

== See also ==
- 2007 killing of French tourists in Mauritania
- 2005 El Mreiti base attack
- Israel–Mauritania relations
