= Meirav Ben-Ari =

Israeli politician (born 1975)

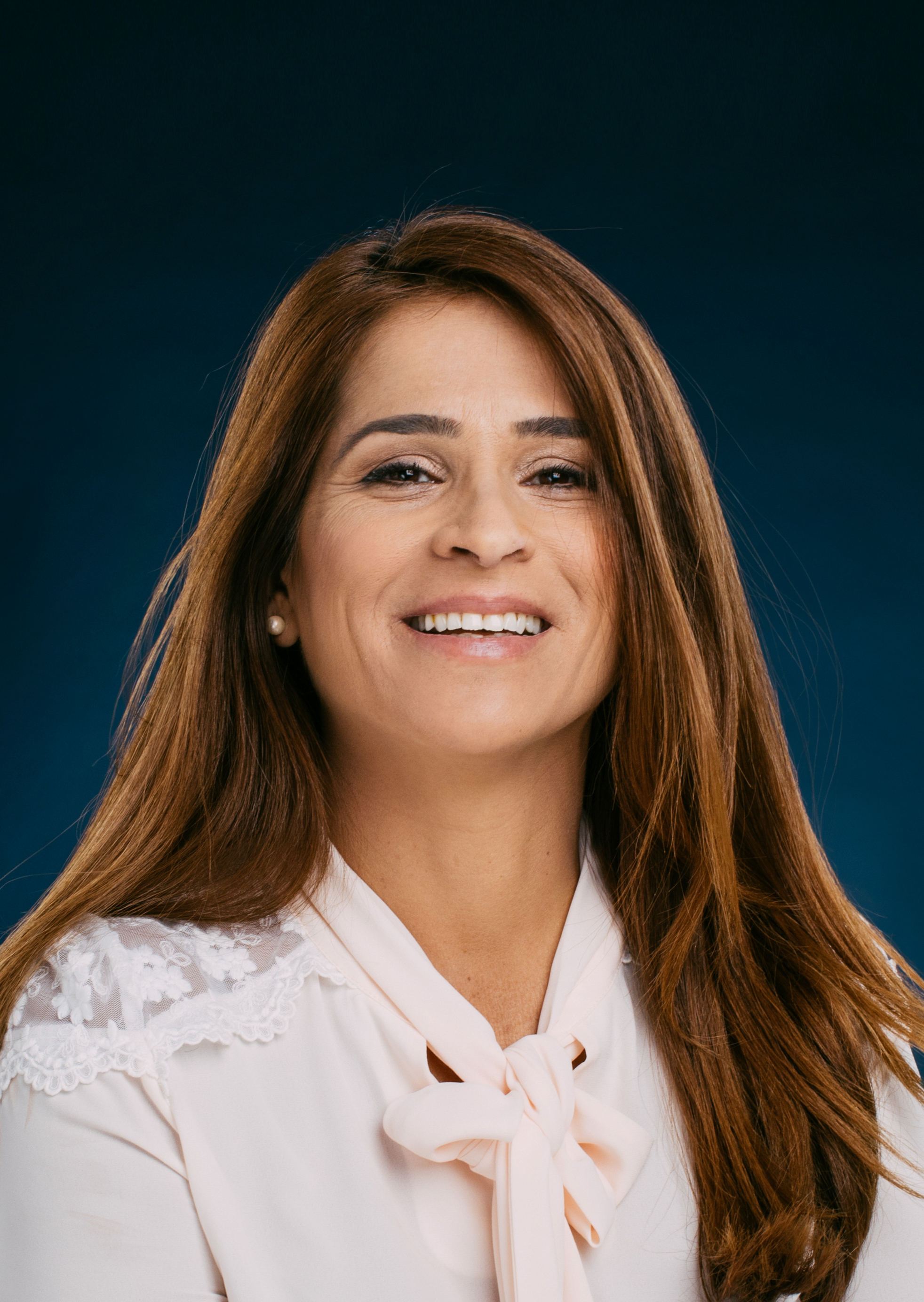
- Ben-Ari in 2020

Faction represented in the Knesset
- 2015–2019: Kulanu
- 2021–2026: Yesh Atid
- 2026–: Together

Personal details
- Born: 13 November 1975 (age 51) Raanana, Israel

Meirav Ben-Ari (Hebrew: מֵירַב בֶּן־אֲרִי; born 13 November 1975) is an Israeli politician. She currently serves as a member of the Knesset for Together and was previously a member of the Knesset for Yesh Atid from 2021 until 2026 as well as Kulanu between 2015 and 2019.

== Biography ==
Ben-Ari was born in Raanana and moved to Netanya with her family as a child. Her father, Rafael Ben-Ari (originally Ayubi) was an Iranian Jewish immigrant to Israel and her mother, Esther Ben-Ari (née Sa'adon) was a native born-Israeli of Libyan-Jewish origin. During her Israel Defense Forces national service she served in the Education and Youth Corps, with her last post being the education officer of the Golani Brigade. She studied for a BA in law and government and a Master's degree in business administration at the Interdisciplinary Center Herzliya. Between 2003 and 2004 she was head of the student union at the college.

== Political career ==
In the 2013 local elections she was fourth on the Rov HaIr list for Tel Aviv City Council. She was elected to the council and given the portfolio for promoting youth.

Prior to the 2015 elections she joined the Kulanu party, and was placed tenth on its list. She was elected to the Knesset as the party won ten seats. She was placed sixth on the party's list for the April 2019 elections, but lost her seat when the party was reduced to four seats. In 2021 Ben-Ari joined Yesh Atid and was placed seventh on its list for the March 2021 elections. She re-entered the Knesset when the party won seventeen seats. She was re-elected in the 2022 elections. Ben-Ari was the first woman to be appointed chair of the Knesset's National Security Committee in 2021.

Ben-Ari, as a member of the State Control Committee, voted in October 2025 in favor of creating a commission of inquiry on the 7 October attacks, though it was voted down.

She served as the "coordinator" for the opposition during the 25th Knesset.

She was placed fourth on the Together list and was elected to the Knesset.

== Controversies ==
In October 2023, during a Knesset plenary debate on the Gaza war, Ben-Ari stated that “the children in Gaza have brought this upon themselves”, insisting “there is no symmetry” between Israeli and Palestinian casualties. The remark’s video clip spread widely online and was condemned by human-rights commentators for blaming minors for the conflict.

== Private life ==
In 2005 she took part in the reality show "Needed: A Leader". She won the contest, winning five million shekels.

She lives in Tel Aviv and has a daughter.

== See also ==
- Women of Israel
