= Committee on the Status of Women and Gender Equality =

The Committee for the Advancement of the Status of Women and Gender Equality (Hebrew language: הוועדה לקידום מעמד האישה ולשוויון מגדרי) is one of the Israeli Knesset's standing committees.

== History ==
At the end of the 12th Knesset, after the official ratification of the "Convention on the Elimination of All Forms of Discrimination against Women (CEDAW)" in the Knesset, the "Special Committee on the Status of Women" was established. The special committee was headed by MK Sarah Doron of the Likud and included members Shulamit Aloni, Geula Cohen, Tamar Gozansky, and others. During its short period of activity, the committee recorded several achievements, including the Chief Rabbinate's agreement to publish regulations on the status of women in rabbinical courts; and support for legislation that allowed married women to be recognized as independent taxpayers in income tax.

About six months later, the Committee for the Advancement of the Status of Women was established in the 13th Knesset, according to a Knesset resolution of 16 November 1992, with the aim of implementing one of the main recommendations that appeared in the report of the State Committee for the Advancement of the Status of Women (1978), headed by MK Ora Namir. The first chairwoman of the committee was MK Yael Dayan. and most of the chairwomen of the committee since its establishment have been women.

The committee's main area of activity is the advancement of the status of women in Israel towards gender equality in representation, education, and personal status. The committee also works to prevent discrimination based on sex or sexual orientation in all areas, as well as to reduce gaps in the economy and labor market, and to combat violence against women. In December 2013, the committee's name was changed to its current name, at the initiative of the committee's chairwoman, Aliza Lavie.
