= Avi Simhon =

Israeli economist

- אבי שמחון
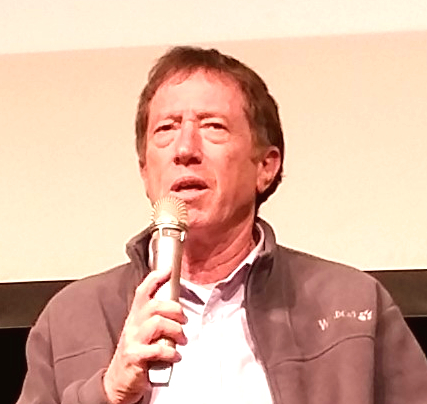
- Portrait of Avi Simhon

Chairman of the National Economic Council
- In office 2023–present
- Prime Minister: Benjamin Netanyahu
- In office 2015–2021
- Prime Minister: Benjamin Netanyahu

Personal details
- Born: 1959 (age 66–67) Kadima, Israel
- Education: Hebrew University of Jerusalem; University of Minnesota
- Scientific career
- Fields: Macroeconomics

Avraham (Avi) Simhon (Hebrew: אבי שמחון; born 1959) is an Israeli economist who served as chair of the National Economic Council between 2015-2021, and again since 2023.

Prior to chairing the council he was an economic advisor to the Minister of Finance and head of the Department of Agricultural Economics at the Hebrew University.

== Biography ==
Avi Simhon was born in Kadima. His paternal ancestors were Moroccan Jews who made Aliyah in 1840 and founded Neve Tzedek. His grandfather, Yehoshua Simhon, was a Russian-born Jew who was one of the founders of Kadima and the first chairman of the settlement.

=== Education ===
Simhon received his undergraduate degree (B.A.) in economics and mathematics from the Hebrew University in 1984.

In 1986 he received a graduate degree (M.A.) in economics in 1986.

In 1992 Simhon received a doctorate from the University of Minnesota. His doctoral advisors were Nobel Prize laureate in economics Edward Prescott and professor Neil Wallace.

In addition, he was a postdoctoral fellow at the Hebrew University's Economics Department in 1994, and has been teaching economics since then.

=== Public Service ===
In 2010 he was appointed economic advisor to Finance Minister Yuval Steinitz instead of professor Omer Moav.

Avi Simhon was a member of the Committee for Economic and Social Change (the Trachtenberg Committee) and of the Committee for the Examination of Poverty Indices in Israel (the Itzhaki Committee).

Simhon is an expert on macroeconomics and the Israeli economy. He also has an expertise in corruption in the fields of labour sciences. He was appointed by Benjamin Netanyahu as chairman of the National Economic Council in December 2015 and served until 2021, when he resigned over Naftali Bennett's election to prime minister. He was reappointed to the position by Netanyahu in 2023.

In October 2012, Simhon announced his intention to run in the Likud primaries for the Knesset. He was placed in the 53rd place on the Likud Yisrael Beiteinu Knesset list. He ran in the Likud primaries in 2022 and was placed in the 53rd place a second time.

== Controversies ==
In the past, Simhon published an article in The Marker, titled "A Family with 8 Children is a Sin", which draw a lot of criticism. In the article, Simhon asked: "We are not like Sweden, Finland and Denmark, and what is the iron ceiling that prevents Israel from joining the 10 or 15 most prosperous countries in the world? The reason lies in the fact that in Israel two large groups – ultraorthodox and arabs – Almost completely different from the rest of the economy."

== Personal life ==
Simhon is married, has three children and lives in Jerusalem.
