= Ghaida Rinawie Zoabi =

Israeli politician (born 1972)

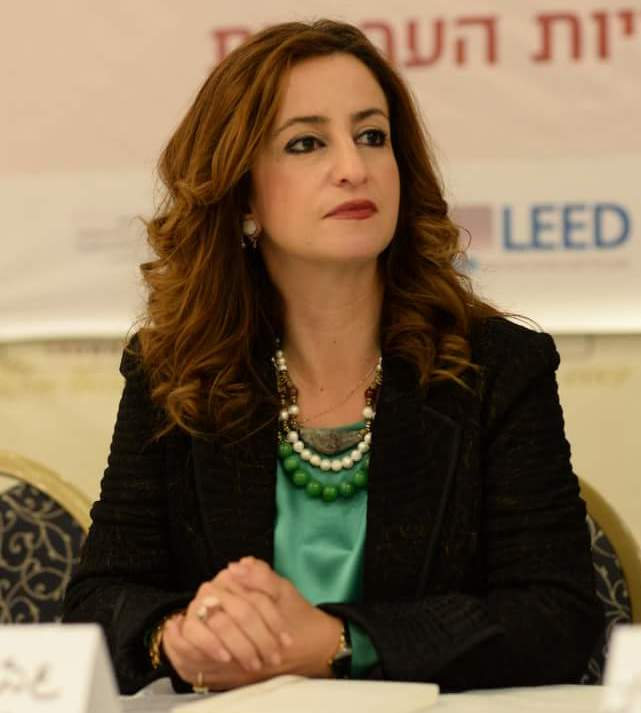
- Rinawie Zoabi in 2018

Faction represented in the Knesset
- 2021–2022: Meretz

Personal details
- Born: 28 September 1972 (age 53) Nazareth, Israel

Ghaida Rinawie Zoabi (Arabic: غيداء ريناوي-زعبي; Hebrew: גַיְדָּא רִינָאוִי־זֻעְבִּי; born 28 September 1972) is an Israeli Arab activist, politician and diplomat. She was a member of the Knesset representing Meretz from 2021 to 2022.

== Biography ==
=== Early life and education ===
Zoabi was born in Nazareth, the eldest daughter of a nephrologist who was amongst the founders of the dialysis department at the EMMS Nazareth Hospital and a homemaker. She attended St Joseph's School and then studied for a bachelor's degree in Hebrew literature and psychology at the Hebrew University of Jerusalem. She later earned a master's degree in literature at the University of Haifa.

=== Career ===
Zoabi founded Injaz, the Centre for Professional Arab Local Governance. She became a member of the board of directors at Ruppin Academic Center and served on the Prime Minister's Round Table for Emergency Preparedness. She was selected by TheMarker as one of the 100 most influential people in Israel in 2011, while Forbes listed her as one of the 50 most important women in the Israeli economy in 2018. In 2015 she was the first Arab woman to win the Proper Government award.

==== Political career ====
Prior to the 2021 elections she was placed fourth on the Meretz list. During the election campaign she was criticised after stating that, out of respect for the Arab sector of Israel, she would abstain from voting on any legislation banning conversion therapy, later saying she would support legislation that supported LGBTQ rights. She was elected to the Knesset as the Meretz party won six seats.

In February 2022 Zoabi was appointed consul-general to Shanghai, becoming the first Israeli-Arab woman to serve as a senior diplomat. The appointment was delayed. On 19 May she resigned from the coalition, lowering its number to a minority of 59, but rejoined the coalition three days later.

Zoabi was accused of playing a central part in the fall of the Bennett–Lapid government her party was part of, due to her voting repeatedly against the Meretz party line. Among the coalition bills she voted against were those concerning Haredi conscription and the approval of West Bank regulations. According to the Walla! news website, Zoabi was pressured in doing so by the ultra-orthodox Shas party, at the time in the opposition.

=== Controversy ===
In October 2023 there were media reports about Zoabi working as a consultant for an organisation providing services to West Bank settlements under the umbrella of the Shas-controlled Interior Ministry. Meretz Secretary General Tomer Reznik wrote to the attorney general calling for a criminal investigation against Zoabi due to "concern that the position given to former MK Zoabi allegedly constitutes bribery as defined by law", while activist Yaya Fink stated he had filed a complaint to the police. However, no action was taken against her. Zoabi subsequently moved to Dubai in the United Arab Emirates.
