= House Committee (Israel) =

Knesset procedural committee in Israel

The House Committee (Hebrew: ועדת הכנסת, Knesset Committee) is a permanent Knesset committee which oversees issues related to the management of the Knesset and other committees. It has been chaired by Ofir Katz since 2023.

== Activity ==
The House committee is responsible for overseeing the Knesset’s Rules of Procedure and handling all matters deriving from it. This committee handles issues related to the parliamentary immunity of Knesset members, including requests for its waiver, and administers the internal regulations of the parliament. In addition, the committee recommends the composition of the factions and the allocation of members and chairmen to both the standing and temporary Committees of the Knesset. It also plays a central role in distributing responsibilities to the various committees and coordinating their activities.

In addition to its procedural duties, the committee determines which committee should examine each proposed bill and facilitates the handling of public inquiries addressed to the Speaker of the Knesset or other committees. It also oversees financial matters such as payments to Knesset members. Furthermore, it discusses issues and requests that are not within the scope of responsibility of other committees or that are not related to a specific role of the committee.

The committee discusses differences of opinion that arise between Knesset members. For example, when the Knesset plenum decides to discuss a particular bill and refer it to a committee for discussion, the Knesset committee decides which committee will discuss the bill or point of order. The committee also serves as a court of appeal against decisions of the Knesset Presidency, the body that manages the order of debates in the Knesset.

Until the establishment of the Knesset committee, a committee called the organizing committee will fulfill its role in all matters relating to the work arrangements in the Knesset, its discussions, and the framework provided for them.

== Chairmen ==
Portrait	Chairman	Took office	Left office	Party	Ref.
Nir Orbach	Nir Orbach (born 1980)	2021	2023	Yamina	
Ofir Katz	Ofir Katz (born 1980)	2023	Incumbent	Likud	

== Subcommittees ==
- Subcommittee on Amendments to the Knesset Regulations
- Subcommittee on Reviewing Security Procedures for Members of Knesset
- Subcommittee on the Knesset Future Generations Commission
- Subcommittee on the Appearance of Public Officials Before Knesset Committees
- Subcommittee on Inquiries
- Subcommittee on the Knesset Budget
