= Israel–Mauritania relations =

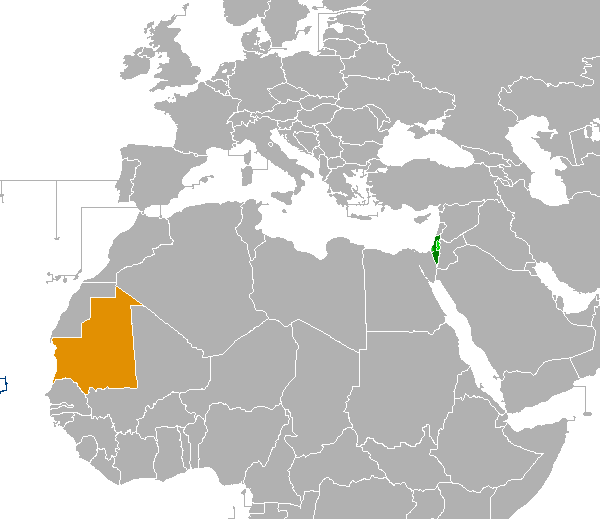
- Israel: Mauritania

Israel–Mauritania relations refers to the historic and current bilateral relationship between Israel and Mauritania. Mauritania declared war on Israel as part of the Six Day War. In 1999, Mauritania became the third member of the Arab League—after Egypt and Jordan—to recognize Israel as a sovereign state. However, after the Gaza War, Mauritania withdrew recognition of Israel in 2009 and severed all relations by March 2010.

== History ==
=== State of war ===
Mauritania declared war on Israel during the Six-Day War in 1967, following the Arab League's collective decision (Mauritania was not admitted to the Arab League until November 1973), and did not reverse that declaration until 1991.

Little public information exists as to the state of war. For some 32 years until about early 1999, Israelis were seemingly oblivious to the ongoing state of war.

Ties warmed by the mid-1990s, including behind the scenes meetings between Mauritania and Israel in 1995 and 1996 said to be at the instigation of Mauritania's President Maaouya Ould Sid'Ahmed Taya and the establishment of unofficial "interest sections" in the respective Spanish embassies in 1996 in the two capital cities.

=== Establishment of ties ===
On 28 October 1999, Mauritania became the third member of the Arab League to recognize Israel as a sovereign state, after Egypt and Jordan. The two countries established full diplomatic relations in October 1999. This official recognition was given by former President Maaouya Ould Sid'Ahmed Taya along with his cooperation with United States anti-terrorism activities. The establishment of full diplomatic relations was signed in Washington D.C on October 28, 1999.

After the coup by the Military Council for Justice and Democracy in August 2005 that ousted President Maaouya Ould Sid'Ahmed Taya, recognition of Israel was maintained.

=== Suspension ===
As a response to the Gaza War, relations were frozen with Israel in January 2009. In February 2009, Mauritania recalled its ambassador from Israel, and on 6 March 2009 staff were evicted from the Israeli embassy in Nouakchott, and given 48 hours to leave Mauritania. According to an announcement by the Israeli Foreign Affairs Ministry, Israel officially closed the embassy later in the day, and by 21 March 2010 all diplomatic relations between the two states had officially come to an end.

Following the Israel–United Arab Emirates peace agreement in August 2020, Mauritania's Foreign Ministry said that his country trusted the "wisdom and good judgement" of the United Arab Emirates leadership for signing an Accord with Israel to agree to normalize relations, and that "the UAE possesses absolute sovereignty and complete independence in conducting its relations and assessing the positions it takes in accordance with its national interest and the interests of Arabs." However, in March 2023, the Mauritanian government denied that there were any discussions to normalize relations with Israel.

== See also ==
- Foreign relations of Israel
- Foreign relations of Mauritania
- List of ambassadors of Israel to Mauritania
- 2008 attack on the Israeli embassy in Mauritania
