= Foreign Affairs and Defense Committee =

Israeli Knesset committee

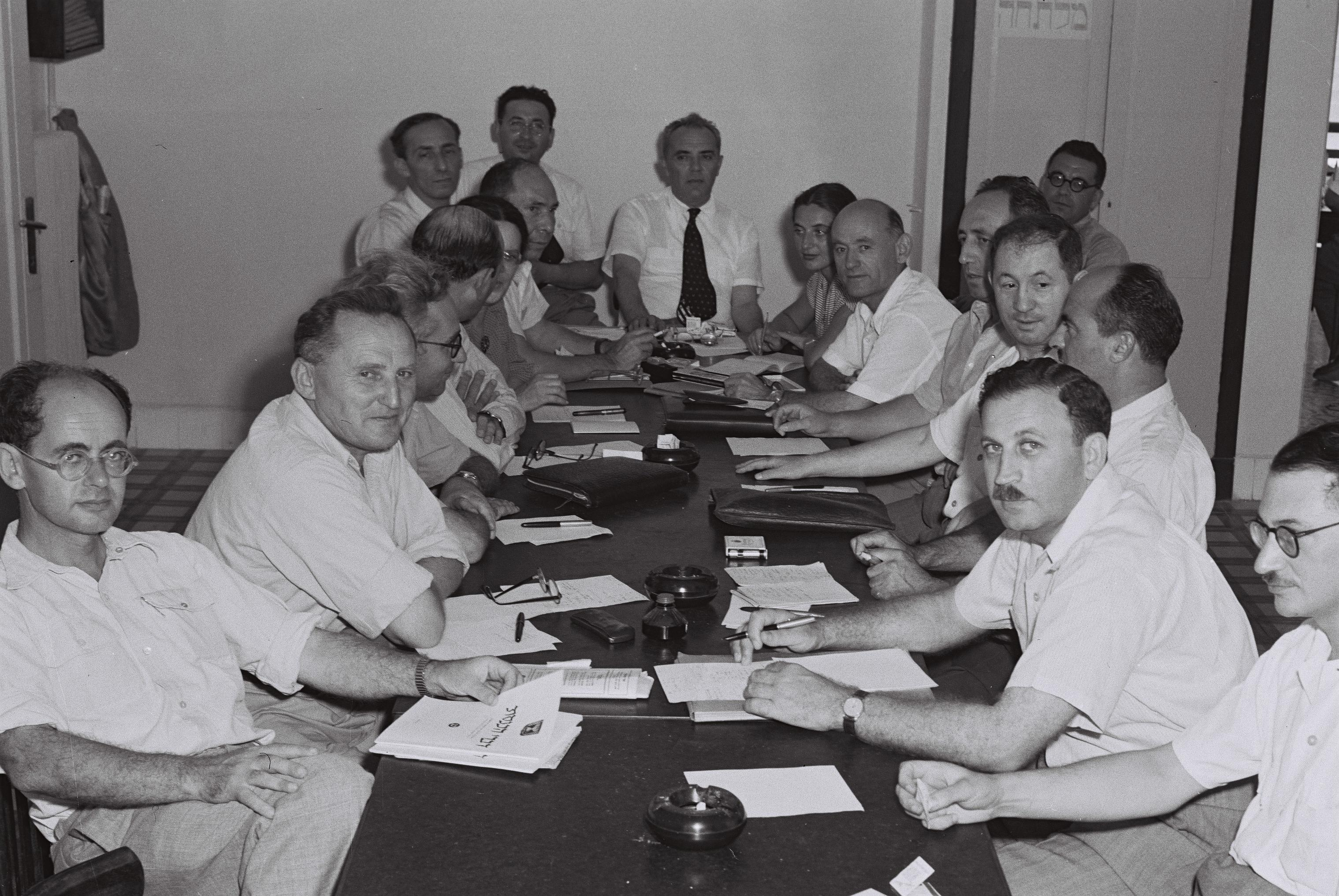
Knesset Foreign Affairs and Defense Committee, 1949

The Foreign Affairs and Defense Committee (Hebrew: ועדת חוץ וביטחון) is a permanent Knesset committee which oversees key foreign and defense issues of the State of Israel, including the drafting of legislation, supervision over related government ministries and the approval of their budgets. It is regarded as one of two most important Knesset committees (the other being the Finance Committee).

== Activity ==
The majority of the committee's activity takes place in its subcommittees, while the committee as a whole largely serves as a media stage for top defense decision makers. The committee approves extensive subcommittee-drafted delegated legislation in areas of defense, emergency preparedness, emergency recruitment of human resources, Shabak special operations, allocation of emergency equipment, the deployment of the Home Front, and other security and intelligence related tasks. The committee is presented with summaries by the top decision makers in areas of foreign affairs, defense, and intelligence, including by the Prime Minister, the Foreign Affairs Minister, the Minister of Defense, and the heads of Mossad, Shabak, and Aman. The committee's chair, who reports on much of the country's defense activities, is considered one of the most senior figures in the Security Forces and subsequently, it is one of the most sought after positions in the Knesset. The committee's plenary sessions are secret and the meetings of some of its subcommittees are top secret. Consequently, its protocols remain largely unpublished. After repeated instances in which the contents of meetings were leaked, its members became obliged to sign a secrecy affidavit. The media has limited access to committee meetings (at selected occasions) and no access to that of its subcommittees. The government is obligated to bring to the approval of the committee various emergency activities, including ones related to or that are likely to result in war. The committee also undertakes personal hearings for key defense and State decision makers as well as hearings for appreciable defense projects.

During 2020, the committee took an active role in shaping the legal framework authorizing Shabak to engage in location tracking of COVID-19 carriers. Eventually, the committee drafted "the Law on Authorization to Assist in the National Effort to Reduce the Spread of the Novel Coronavirus and to Promote the Use of Civilian Technology to Trace Those Who Have Been in Close Contact with Patients (Temporary Order), 5780-2020", which was enacted by the Knesset on 21 July 2020. Under its provisions, the committee may veto a government declaration to use Shabak for COVID-19 contact tracing.

== Chairmen ==
Portrait	Chairman	Took office	Left office	Party	Ref.
Meir Argov	Meir Argov (1905–1963)	1949	1963	Mapai	
David Hacohen	David Hacohen (1898–1984)	1963	1969	Alignment	
Haim Yosef Zadok	Haim Yosef Zadok (1913–2002)	1969	1974	Alignment	
Yitzhak Navon	Yitzhak Navon (1921–2015)	1974	1977	Alignment	
Moshe Arens	Moshe Arens (1925–2019)	1977	1982	Likud	
Eliyahu Ben-Elissar	Eliyahu Ben-Elissar (1932–2000)	1982	1984	Likud	
Abba Eban	Abba Eban (1915–2002)	1984	1988	Alignment	
Eliyahu Ben-Elissar	Eliyahu Ben-Elissar (1932–2000)	1989	1992	Likud	
Ori Orr	Ori Orr (born 1939)	1992	1995	Labor	
Hagai Meirom	Hagai Meirom (born 1946)	1995	1996	Labor	
Uzi Landau	Uzi Landau (born 1943)	1996	1999	Likud	
Dan Meridor	Dan Meridor (born 1947)	1999	2001	Center Party	
David Magen	David Magen (born 1945)	2001	2002	Likud	
Haim Ramon	Haim Ramon (born 1950)	2002	2003	Labor	
Yuval Steinitz	Yuval Steinitz (born 1958)	2003	2006	Likud	
Tzachi Hanegbi	Tzachi Hanegbi (born 1957)	2006	2010	Kadima	
Shaul Mofaz	Shaul Mofaz (born 1948)	2010	2012	Kadima	
Roni Bar-On	Roni Bar-On (born 1948)	2012	2013	Kadima	
Avigdor Lieberman	Avigdor Lieberman (born 1958)	2013	2013	Yisrael Beiteinu	
Yuli Edelstein	Yuli Edelstein (born 1958)	2013	2014	Likud	
Ze'ev Elkin	Ze'ev Elkin (born 1971)	2014	2015	Likud	
Yariv Levin	Yariv Levin (born 1969)	2015	2015	Likud	
Tzachi Hanegbi	Tzachi Hanegbi (born 1957)	2015	2016	Likud	
Avi Dichter	Avi Dichter (born 1952)	2016	2019	Likud	
Gabi Ashkenazi	Gabi Ashkenazi (born 1954)	2019	2020	Blue and White	
Zvi Hauser	Zvi Hauser (born 1968)	2020	2021	Derekh Eretz	
Orna Barbivai	Orna Barbivai (born 1962)	2021	2021	Yesh Atid	
Ram Ben-Barak	Ram Ben-Barak (born 1958)	2021	2022	Yesh Atid	
Yoav Gallant	Yoav Gallant (born 1958)	2022	2022	Likud	
Yuli Edelstein	Yuli Edelstein (born 1958)	2023	2025	Likud	
Boaz Bismuth	Boaz Bismuth (born 1964)	2025	2026	Likud	
Avigdor Lieberman	Avigdor Lieberman (born 1958)	2026		Yisrael Beiteinu	

== Subcommittees ==
- Subcommittee for Legislation
- Subcommittee for Foreign Affairs and Public Diplomacy
- Subcommittee for Intelligence and Secret Services
- Subcommittee for Personnel in the Israel Defense Forces (IDF)
- Subcommittee for Security Perception
- Subcommittee for the State of Alert and Field Security
- Subcommittee for the Examination of Home-Front Readiness
- Subcommittee on Lawfare

== Overseen bodies ==
- The Prime Minister's Office, including Mossad and Shabak
- The Ministry of Defense, including the IDF, the Malmab (Ministry's security arm), and the military industries and development bodies
- The Foreign Ministry
- The National Security Council
- The Ministry of Public Security and the Police (on security matters)
