= Alex Kushnir =

Israeli politician

- אלכס קושניר
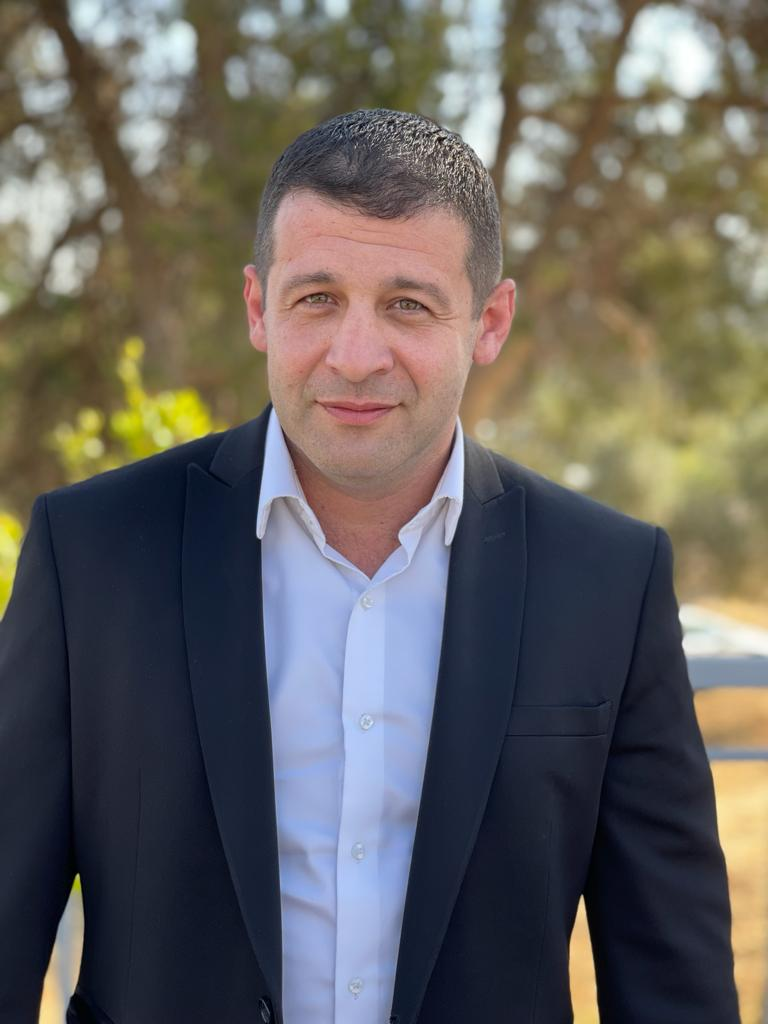

Faction represented in the Knesset
- 2019–2022: Yisrael Beiteinu

Personal details
- Born: Alexander Kushnir; 2 November 1978 (age 48) Drohobych, Ukrainian SSR, Soviet Union
- Education: Ono Academic College

Alexander Kushnir (Hebrew: אלכסנדר קושניר; born 2 November 1978) is an Israeli politician who served as a member of the Knesset for Yisrael Beiteinu between 2019 and 2022

== Biography ==
Kushnir was born in the Soviet Union. In 1992, he immigrated to Israel with his mother, settling in Ashkelon. He joined the Israel Defense Forces as a combatant in the Givati Brigade, rising to become a company commander in the brigade. Upon his release from the IDF, he enlisted in Shin Bet and held a variety of field positions.

Kushnir graduated with a bachelor's degree in economics from the Hebrew University of Jerusalem and an MBA with an internship in finance from Ono Academic College. He has held management positions in the energy, retail, and finance sectors and served as a representative of the American Jewish Joint Distribution Committee in Belarus.

Prior to the 2015 Knesset elections, Kushnir was placed 17th on the Yisrael Beiteinu list. Although the party won only six seats, when Yisrael Beiteinu joined the coalition government the following year, Kushnir was appointed Director-General of the Ministry of Aliyah and Integration when the party's Sofa Landver became the minister responsible for the portfolio. In February 2019, he was placed seventh place on the party's list for the April 2019 elections, but again failed to be elected as Yisrael Beiteinu won only five seats. However, in the early elections in September 2019, he was elected as the party gained eight seats.

Kushnir is married with a daughter and a son. His son, Jan, currently operates as head coach of german football club FSV 1926 Cappel. He lives in Ashkelon.
