= Yonatan Mishraki =

Israeli politician

- יונתן משרקי
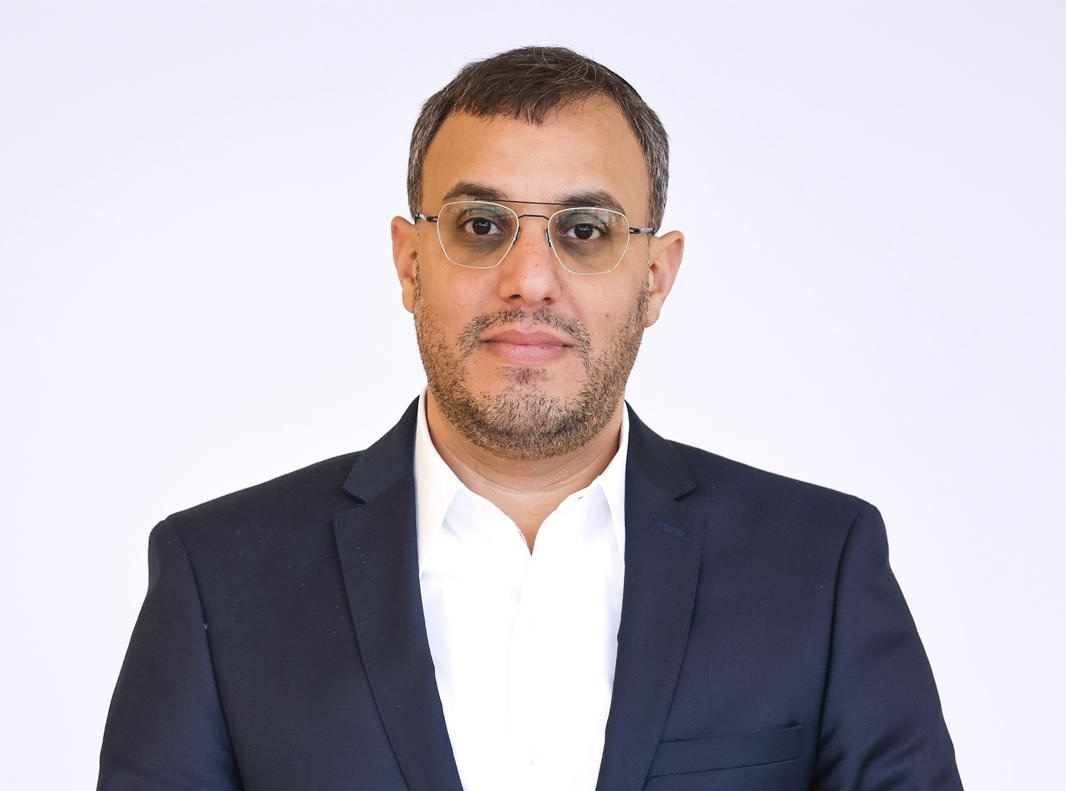

Faction represented in the Knesset
- 2023–2026: Shas

Personal details
- Born: 17 August 1984 (age 42) Jerusalem, Israel
- Party: Shas
- Children: 2
- Education: Mir Yeshiva

Yonatan Mishraki (Hebrew: יונתן משרקי; born 17 August 1984) is an Israeli politician who serves as the head of the Knesset's Health Committee and was a member of the Knesset for Shas.

== Biography ==
Mishraki was born and raised in Jerusalem, in a Yemenite-Jewish family. He studied at a yeshiva in Kiryat Arba, and at the Mir Yeshiva.

Mishraki worked as the manager of Shas's caucus in the Jerusalem City Council, later advising several of the city's Deputy Mayors. In 2016, he was made a personal assistant of Aryeh Deri, and was later made the Ministry for the Periphery's chief of staff.

Mishraki was given the 72nd spot on Shas's electoral list ahead of the 2015 election. He was then given the 17th spot ahead of the April and September elections in 2019; the 16th spot ahead of the 2020 election; the 15th spot ahead of the 2021 election; and the 12th spot ahead of the 2022 election. Mishraki was not elected during this period, but entered the Knesset on 3 January 2023 as part of the Norwegian Law.

He was appointed the head of the Knesset Health Committee in October 2023, replacing Uriel Buso, who became the head of the Ministry of Health. He resigned as the head of the committee in October 2025. Mishraki was reappointed the head of the committee in February 2026, replacing Otzma Yehudit MK Limor Son Har-Melech.

== Personal life ==
Mishraki is married, has two children, and resides in Jerusalem.
