= Realignment plan =

2006–2008 Israeli proposal for a two-state solution

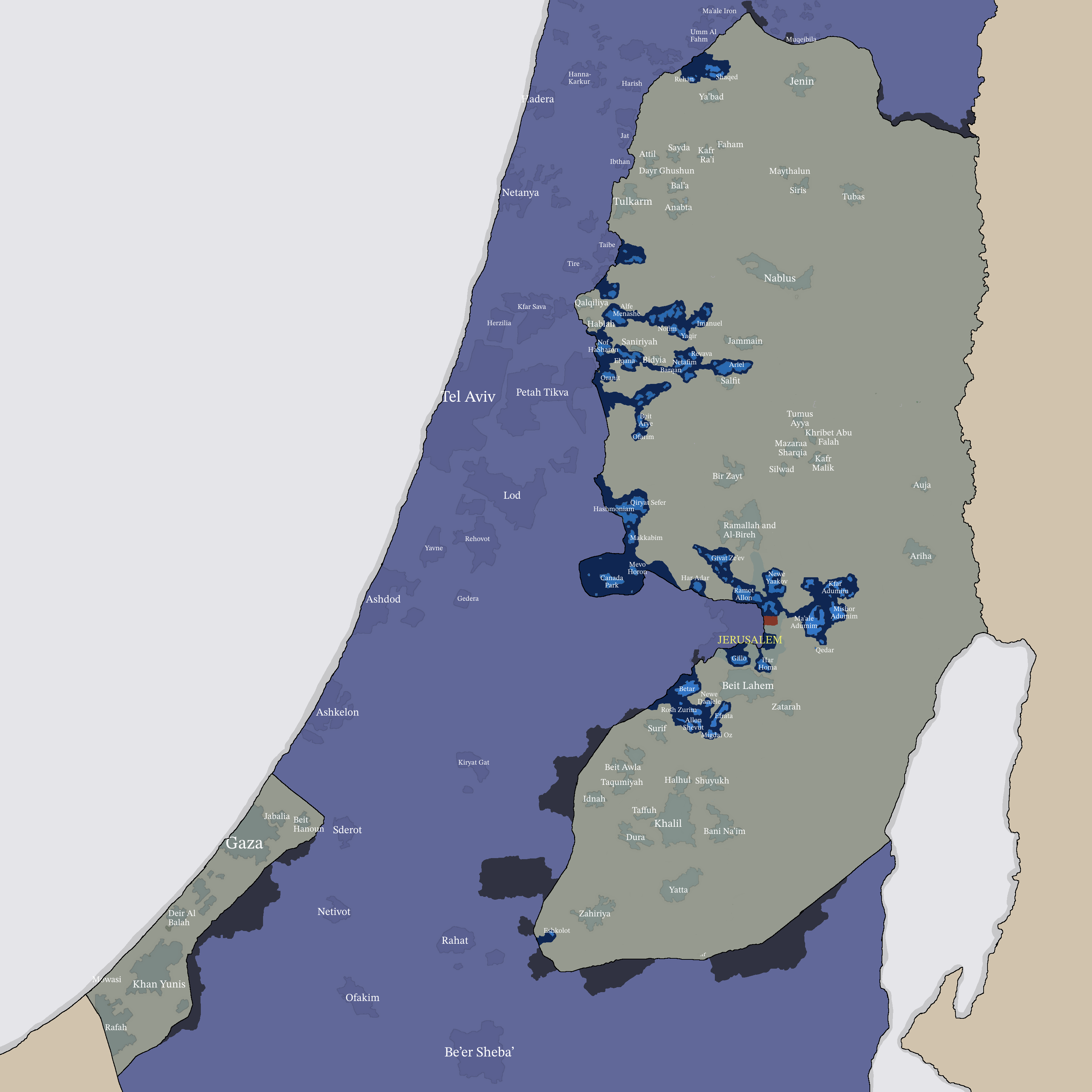
The secret realignment plan, presented by then Israeli Prime Minister Ehud Olmert to Palestinian PM Mahmoud Abbas at a meeting in Jerusalem on 16 September 2008 and publicly revealed by Olmert in February 2025.

The Realignment plan (Hebrew: תוכנית ההתכנסות, romanized: Tokhnit Ha'Hitkansot; Arabic: خطة إعادة التنظيم, romanized: Khutat I'adat al-Tanzim), originally dubbed the convergence plan, was a proposal by Israel to unilaterally disengage from 90% of the West Bank and annex the rest, incorporating most Israeli settlements into Israel. The plan was formulated and introduced to the Israeli public by then acting prime minister, Ehud Olmert, in a number of media interviews during the election campaign for the 17th Knesset in March 2006.

The Convergence Plan was originally scheduled to be implemented within 18 months from early May 2006, but in November 2007, Olmert said that he hoped to implement it within three to four years. Opinion polling found that the proposal was unpopular among the Israeli public.

== Outlines of the plan ==
The outlines of the plan comprised:

- Assuring a Jewish majority in the Palestinian territories under Israeli control
- A permanent border along the West Bank barrier
- Territorial contiguity for a possible Palestinian state
- Permanent Israeli sovereignty or control over the three large and expanded settlement blocs, including the E1 area near Jerusalem.
- Definitive Israeli sovereignty over East Jerusalem
- Israeli control over the border zone at the Jordan River

According to the plan, Israeli settlements in 90% of the West Bank would be evacuated and dismantled. The area of evacuation would largely correspond to the area east of the route of the West Bank barrier that was begun under Olmert's predecessor, Ariel Sharon, or a similar route with national consent and international legitimization. The large Israeli settlement blocs near the Green Line would be annexed to Israel, and the approximately 40,000 residents of the evacuated settlements would be resettled there. During the campaign for the March 2006 election, Sharon was still officially prime minister, but unable to carry out his duties, to communicate or to run in the election due to the major stroke that he suffered on 4 January 2006. Olmert, who became acting prime minister and Kadima party leader after Sharon's stroke, stated that in pursuing a realignment of settlements, he was operating in Sharon's spirit, and that if Sharon had been able to continue carrying out his duties, he would have acted in a similar way.

== Suspension of the plan ==
After the 2006 Lebanon War, Olmert announced to his cabinet that the plan to dismantle some Jewish settlements in the West Bank and unilaterally redraw Israel's borders would not be implemented for the time being. The plan was not revived prior to Olmert's departure from office on 31 March 2009 and the subsequent Likud-led coalition governments have not pursued similar policies. Olmert's successors Tzipi Livni and Shaul Mofaz are also opposed to the proposals.

== 2007 revised plan ==
In July 2007, then Israeli deputy prime minister Haim Ramon proposed a smaller-scale realignment plan, in which Israel would disengage from 70% of the West Bank, and evacuate settlements in the area of withdrawal, mainly isolated communities.

=== English renaming ===
Although the Hebrew name of the plan did not change, the English name rapidly changed from "convergence" to "consolidation" and finally to "realignment", according to the Washington Times and the "language maven" William Safire.

New Historian Ilan Pappé noted that "hitkansut" (the Hebrew word used for the plan) most aptly translates as "ingathering". Pappé said that the plan was designed to address the "demographic threat" posed by Palestinian population growth to the maintenance of a "Jewish state", by leaving several populous Palestinian areas outside direct Israeli control.

== 2008 secret offer ==
In September 2008, Olmert made a comprehensive plan as a secret offer to Palestinian President Mahmoud Abbas, which would have had Israel annexing just 6.3% of the West Bank, and the implementation of a five-nation trusteeship for the Holy Basin surrounding the Old City of Jerusalem. Olmert asked Abbas if he could immediately accept the plan, which he said he was not able to do without further study. The proposal was ultimately never implemented.

== Reception ==
=== Opinion polling in Israel ===
In two polls of Israeli opinion on the plan conducted on behalf of the Yisrael Beiteinu political party, some 70% of respondents said that they were opposed to the plan. The polls also revealed that some 65–70% of those who backed Israel's disengagement from Gaza in 2005 opposed the plan.

=== Reception in Palestine and the Arab World ===
Palestinian Authority president Mahmoud Abbas opposed the plan, and called on all Arab states to oppose it, stating that "we are working to get Olmert's plan off the table". Jordanian king Abdullah II and Egyptian president Hosni Mubarak released a joint statement expressing opposition to "unilateral Israeli steps" and that "every step should be carried out through direct negotiations with the Palestinian side and in accordance with the Road Map, which leads to a sustainable Palestinian state alongside Israel", following a meeting in Sharm el-Sheikh.

=== International reception ===
The European Union opposed the plan, stating that it would not recognize any unilateral border changes that were not agreed upon in negotiations, although the EU External Relations Commissioner said that it was a "courageous idea".

In 2006, it was reported that the George W. Bush administration reacted positively to the proposal, but did not explicitly endorse it in talks with Olmert and his government.

== See also ==
- Israeli disengagement from Gaza
- Annapolis Conference
- Palestinian Prisoners' Document
- Homesh First
- Yossi Dagan
