= Idit Silman =

Israeli politician

- עידית סילמן
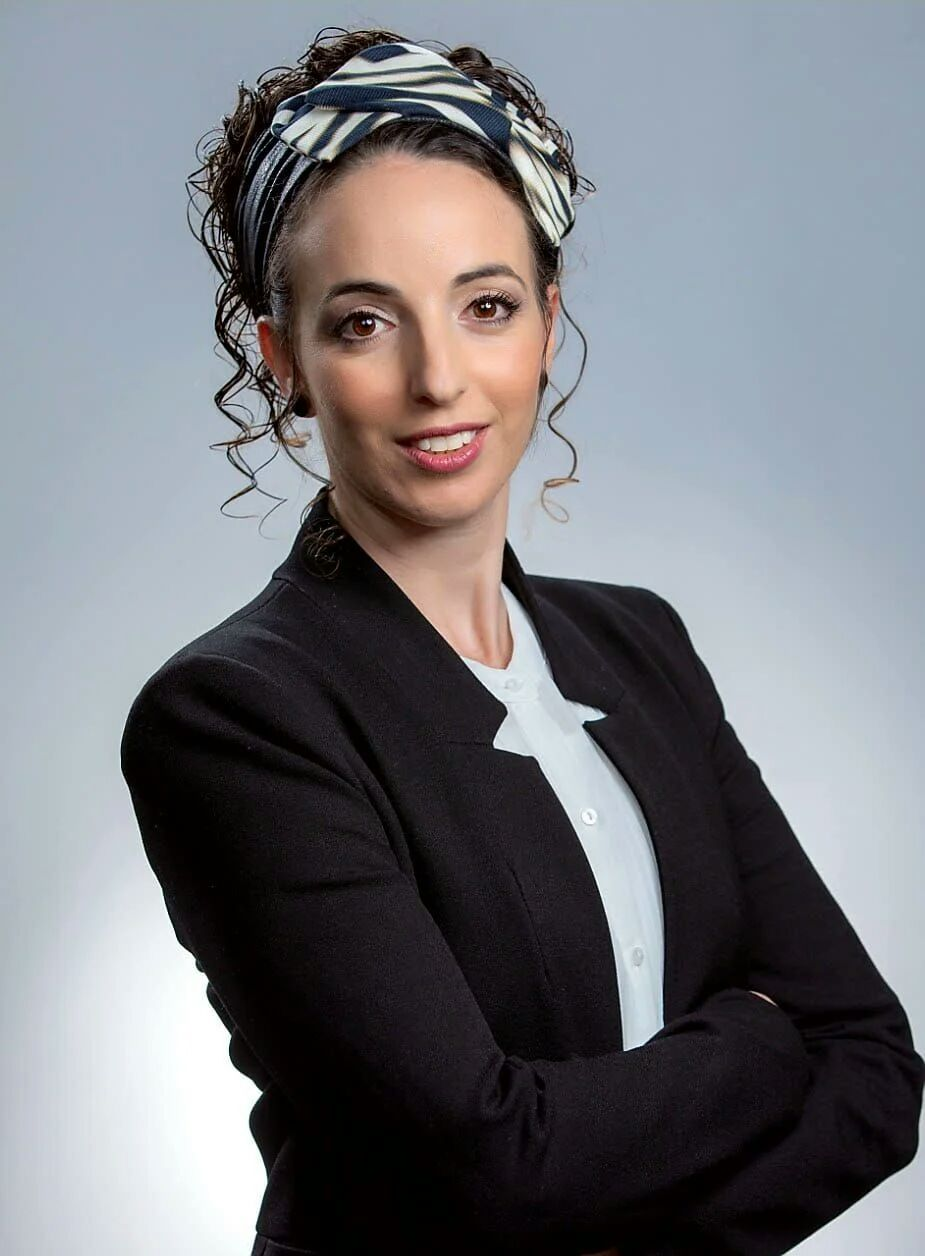
- Official portrait, 2019

Ministerial roles
- 2022–: Minister of Environmental Protection

Faction represented in the Knesset
- 2019: Union of Right-Wing Parties
- 2021–2022: Yamina
- 2022–present: Likud

Personal details
- Born: Idit Levy; 27 October 1980 (age 46) Rehovot, Israel
- Spouse: Shmuel Silman
- Children: 3

Idit Silman (Hebrew: עידית סילמן; born 27 October 1980) is an Israeli politician and Likud member who currently serves as the Minister of Environmental Protection. She previously served in the Knesset for Likud from 2022 to 2023, for Yamina from 2021 to 2022, and for the Union of Right-Wing Parties in 2019.

Silman was the coalition whip for Yamina from 2021 until her resignation from the coalition on 6 April 2022. By defecting while retaining her individual parliamentary mandate, she stripped the government of its narrow majority, which led to its collapse.

== Early life ==
Idit Silman was born in Rehovot to immigrant Moroccan Jewish parents from Morocco, and was educated at Ulpana Tzfira. As a teenager she joined public activity organized by the Mafdal party. She was drafted into the IDF and served as an instructor in the field school in Sha'ar HaGai.

She finished her undergraduate studies and teaching certificate in life science and sports and her graduate degree in physical education in the Wingate Institute. She worked as a teacher for several years. Upon completing her MBA at the Peres Academic Center, she worked in marketing in the health sector.

== Political career ==
Silman joined the Jewish Home into which Mafdal was merged, where she was chosen for the female spot on the party list for the April 2019 Knesset elections. When the party joined the Union of the Right-Wing Parties alliance, she was placed fifth on its list, going on to enter the Knesset as the alliance won five seats.

Silman was given the eighth slot on the Yamina list (a joint ticket of the New Right, The Jewish Home, and National Union) for the elections to the 22nd Knesset. However Yamina won only seven seats, and Silman lost her seat in the Knesset.

Silman left the Jewish Home for the New Right on 15 January 2020, and was placed in the seventh slot on the Yamina list the same day when the alliance was re-established for the 2020 Israeli legislative election. She was the first person to chair the Health Committee.

She was placed in the eighth slot of the Yamina list ahead of the 2021 Israeli legislative election. She became an MK after Alon Davidi resigned from the Yamina list before being sworn in.

On 6 April 2022, Silman resigned from the coalition, causing the governing coalition of Prime Minister Naftali Bennett to lose its majority in the Knesset, and raising the possibility of new elections in Israel for the fifth time in four years. Prime Minister Bennett claimed that Silman had been "persecuted for months" by supporters of Likud party leader and opposition leader Benjamin Netanyahu "at the most horrific level" until she "broke" and left the coalition.

Silman faced allegations that her resignation coincided with an assurance from Benjamin Netanyahu that the tenth place on the Likud list in the upcoming elections would be secured for her and that she would be guaranteed the position of Minister of Health. However, Silman asserted that her decision to retire was not linked to any such commitment. She referenced the fact that the Minister of Health, Nitzan Horowitz, citing a supreme court decision, instructed hospitals to allow visitors to enter with chametz (leavened bread) during Passover. Possessing chametz during Passover is forbidden under Jewish religious laws. On 2 May, in her first interview since her resignation from the coalition, Silman said that she made the move due to various religion-related actions of the coalition. Specifically, she referenced the upcoming reforms in kashrut-oversight authorities, changes in authorizations to conduct giyur (conversion to Judaism), discussions about creating a section for the non-Orthodox in the Western Wall Plaza, and the Treasury Minister's decision to limit financial support of poor families whose parents neither work, nor engage in studies with the intention of acquiring a profession. This last category is seen by some as a way to coerce Haredim to reduce their religious learning studies and enter the secular world.

Silman resigned from the Knesset on 11 September and was replaced by Orna Starkmann. She was later given the 16th spot on the Likud's list ahead of the 2022 election. Following the results Silman returned for an additional term as an MK with Likud winning 32 seats.

On 29 December 2022, Silman was appointed Environmental Protection Minister by Benjamin Netanyahu during the formation of the thirty-seventh government of Israel. She resigned from the Knesset on 7 January 2023 as part of the Norwegian Law. Upon Silman's appointment, Galit Cohen, who served as Director General of the Environmental Protection Ministry for 22 years, resigned from her position. In September 2023, she signed an agreement with the US regarding cooperation on environmental issues.

After the Hamas attack on 7 October 2023, she was chased out of a hospital after attempting to visit survivors of the attacks, as both relatives of the injured and staff of the hospital angrily shouted at her, holding the government and their actions, and by extension her, responsible for the political climate that led to the attacks, accusing that they have "ruined" the country of Israel.

In November 2024, she represented Israel at the UN Climate Change Conference [COP 29] in Baku, Azerbaijan.

In July 2026, Silman reclassified the Nile crocodile from a wild animal to a "cultivated wild animal" to allow the Israel Prison Service to station crocodiles around prisons. When faced with criticism from ecologists for the construction of a crocodile-filled moat around Ktzi'ot Prison, Silman stated that the crocodiles in the moat would be treated better than Palestinian prisoners.

On August 17, 2026, Silman achieved a non-realistic place in the Likud's 2026 primary elections, along with several other reigning ministers and MKs.

=== Political positions ===
In an 11 March 2025 interview, Silman indicated her support for US President Donald Trump's proposal to displace Palestinians from the Gaza Strip. She stated that the "only solution for the Gaza Strip is to empty it of Gazans," continuing that the government of Prime Minister Netanyahu was "committed to the idea of encouraging emigration" and that "God has sent us the U.S. administration, and it is clearly telling us – it's time to inherit the land."

During a debate in the Knesset on December 3, 2025, she stated that the Israeli army should kill Palestinians who burn garbage in the West Bank.

In March 2026, during Operation Roaring Lion, Silman sent a letter to US President Donald Trump, requesting him to use personal sanctions against President of the Supreme Court Yitzhak Amit and the Attorney General of Israel Gali Baharab Miara, on grounds they are preventing a Presidential pardon for prime minister Benjamin Netanyahu, who is standing trial for corruption and breach of fiduciary duty charges.

== Personal life ==
She is married to Shmuel Silman and has three children. She resides in Rehovot.
