= Avrohom Rubinstein =

Israeli politician

- אברהם רובינשטיין
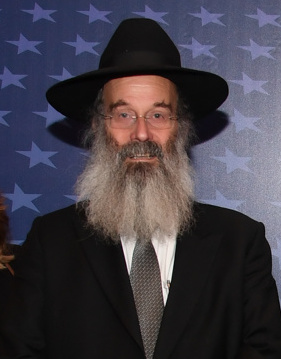

Mayor of Bnei Brak
- In office February 2013 – November 2013
- Preceded by: Ya'akov Asher
- Succeeded by: Hanoch Zeibert
- In office 20 November 2018 – 19 March 2024
- Preceded by: Hanoch Zeibert
- Succeeded by: Hanoch Zeibert

Personal details
- Born: 18 June 1958 (age 68) Bnei Brak
- Party: Degel HaTorah

Avrohom Rubinstein (Hebrew: אברהם רובינשטיין, born 18 June 1958) is an Israeli rabbi who served as the mayor of the Israeli city of Bnei Brak and as secretary of the Moetzes Gedolei HaTorah. He is also a member of the staff of the Independent Education System.

== Life ==
Rubinstein was born in Bnei Brak and was educated at the Ponevezh Yeshiva. He is married and has 14 children. One of his sons died from cancer at the age of 16.

After then Mayor Ya'akov Asher was elected in 2013 Israeli legislative election to the Knesset, the city council choose Rubinstein as acting mayor until the 2013 Israeli municipal elections later that year.

He was a close confidant of Rabbi Chaim Kanievsky and one of Kanievsky's grandsons is married to Rubinstein's daughter.

He serves as secretary of the Moetzes Gedolei HaTorah since the end of the 1990s and was elected as Mayor of Bnei Brak in the 2018 Israeli municipal elections with approximately 82 percent of the votes after being endorsed by Rabbi Kanievsky.
