= Health Committee =

Permanent Knesset committee

The Health Committee is a permanent Knesset committee.

It was formed in 2021 after the Labor, Welfare and Health Committee was divided into two committees, the Labor and Welfare Committee and the Health Committee.

== Chairs ==
Portrait	Chair	Took office	Left office	Party	Ref.
Idit Silman	Idit Silman (born 1980)	2021	2022	Yamina	
Uriel Buso	Uriel Buso (born 1973)	2022	2023	Shas	
Yonatan Mishraki	Yonatan Mishraki (born 1984)	2023	2025	Shas	
Limor Son Har-Melech	Limor Son Har-Melech (born 1979)	2025	2026	Otzma Yehudit	
Yonatan Mishraki	Yonatan Mishraki (born 1984)	2026		Shas	
Tsega Melaku	Tsega Melaku (born 1966)	Approx. May 2026		Likud	
