= Holy Basin =

Geographical area in Jerusalem

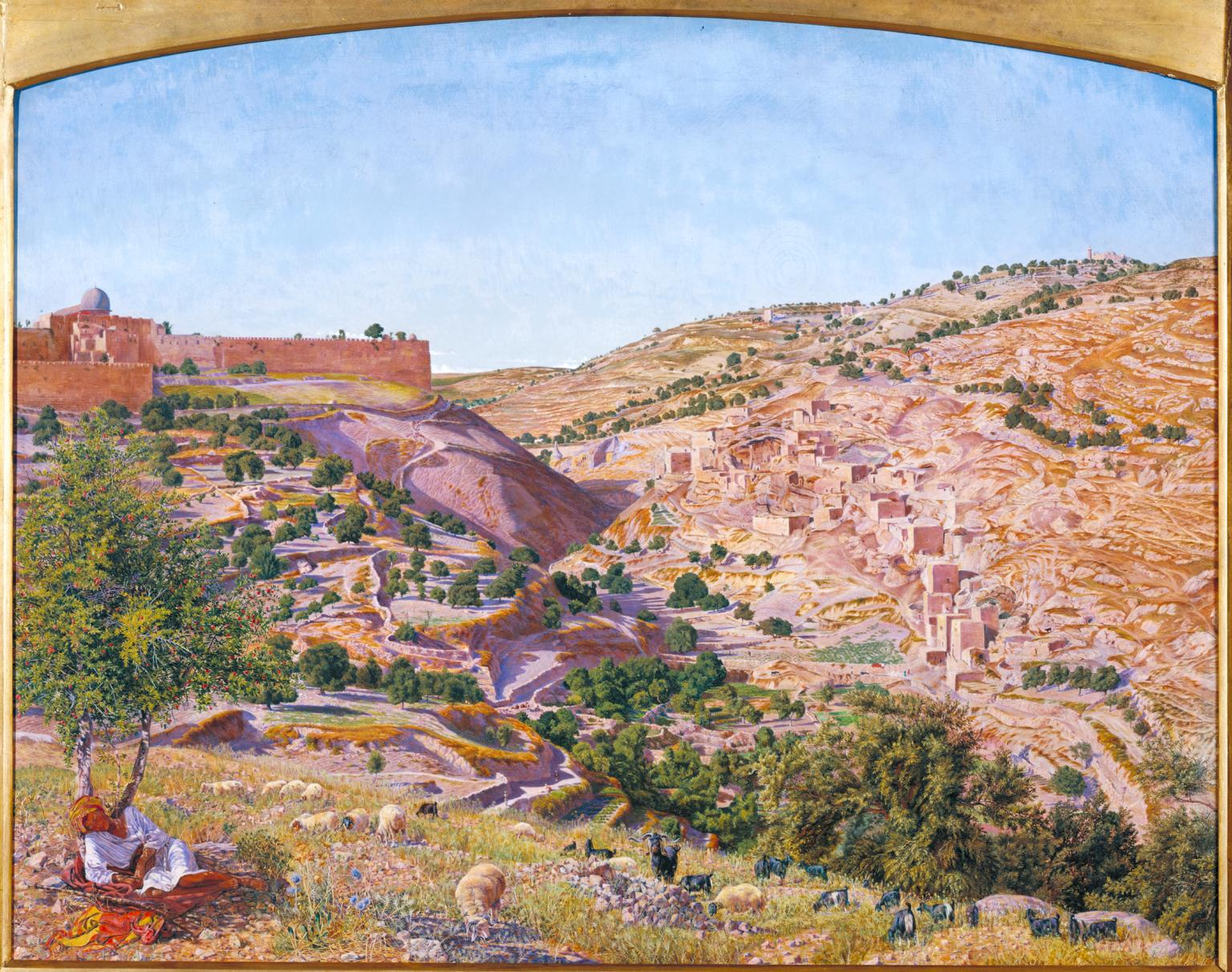
A view from Valley of Jehoshaphat, a drawing from the 19th century of Thomas Seddon.

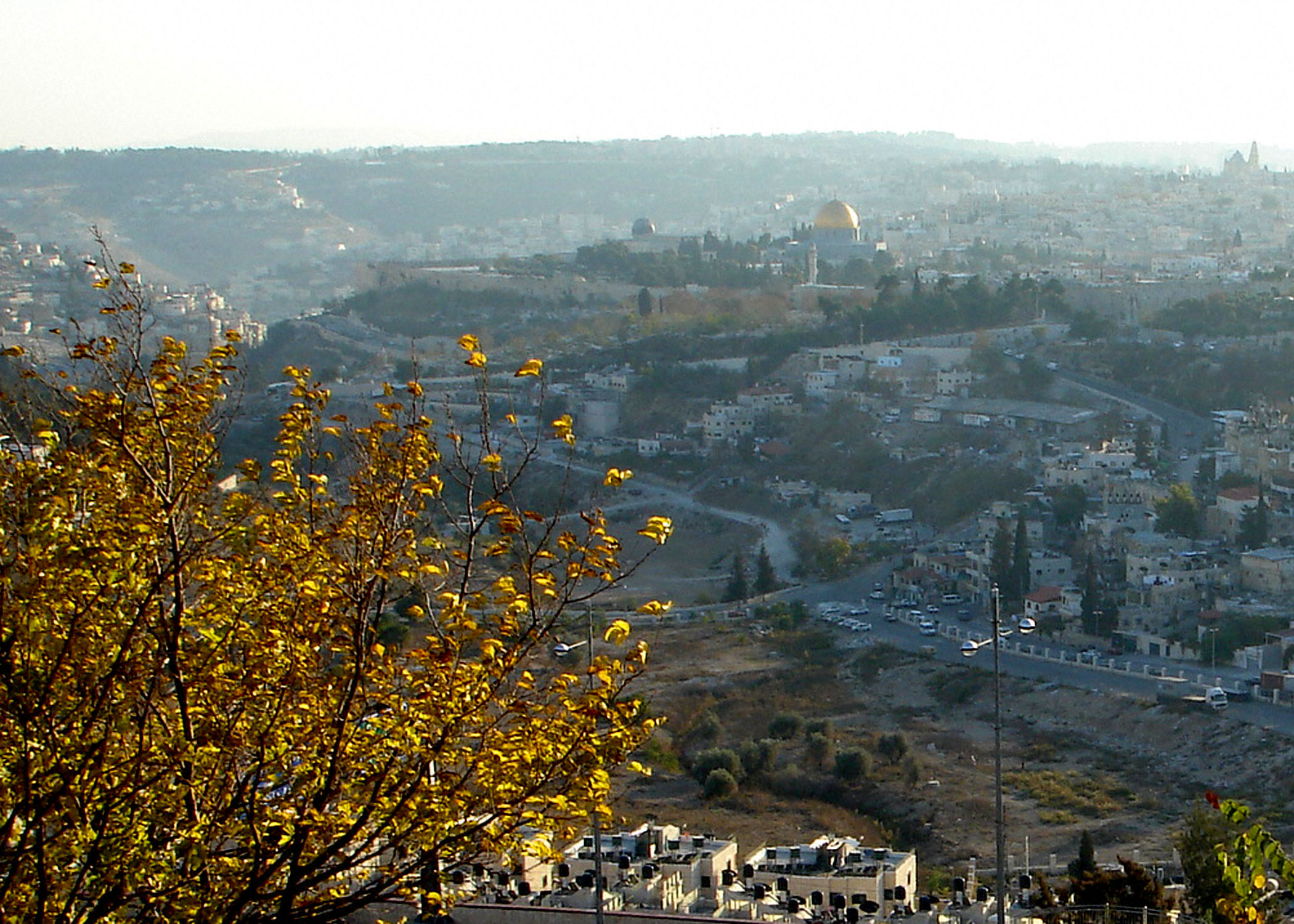
A view at the Holy Basin from Mount Scopus.

Holy Basin (Hebrew: האגן הקדוש, HaAgan HaKadosh), or Historic Basin (Hebrew: האגן ההיסטורי, HaAgan HaHistori) is a modern Israeli term for a geographical area in Jerusalem that includes the Old City and its adjacent territories. The term was coined by the contemporary Israeli generation as part of a political-academic discourse on how one refers to the area in Jerusalem where the historical and holy sites are concentrated. The term is being used in the field of geographical research and in contemporary geo-political studies specializing in urban planning, such as local master plans for Jerusalem and studies concerning the political future of the city.

== Background ==
The Holy Basin, in effect – Jerusalem, a concentrated geographical area of thousands of years of history and hundreds of holy places – some common to Judaism, Christianity and Islam, and some are unique to one of the three religions. Isaac Tischler maintains that David Ben-Gurion argued that "Jerusalem is not Shuafat, Beit Hanina or Sur Baher, nor Abu Dis, but rather the Holy Basin – the Temple Mount and the Old City". He added that the suggestion of Ben-Gurion to destroy the old city walls after the unification of the city intended to erase the boundary between the Holy Basin and the new city.

In a comprehensive study on the holy basin, Professor Ruth Lapidoth starts with an example out of the first speech, in the First Knesset, by the poet Uri Zvi Greenberg. In this speech, in which the poet dedicated to "Divided Jerusalem" and the Jewish yearning to the Old City across the border, he emphasized that the name Jerusalem is directed only to the Jerusalem that is within the walls of Jerusalem, "where Temple Mount lies", and all that was built in the modern era – beyond the holy basin, is no more than "fecundation of Jerusalem. "

== Geography ==
The areas constituting the Basin and their boundaries are not agreed upon by all those using the terms Historic Basin and Holy Basin. In a study conducted for the Jerusalem Institute for Israel Studies (JIIS), the researchers offer three options:

1. A "minimal" basin including only the Old City within its walls;
2. A medium version, including the Old City, Mount Zion and the western slope of the Mount of Olives;
3. A large version, with the Old City, Mount Zion, the western slope of the Mount of Olives, as well as the City of David and the Christian institutions north of Damascus Gate.

=== Boundaries ===
In International Involvement in the "Historic Basin" in Jerusalem, a paper written for the JIIS in 2003, the researchers Kobi Michael and Dr Moshe Hirsch drew the boundaries of the basin as follows. The criteria for these boundaries were: (1) Maximum concentration of the holy sites of the three monotheistic religions; (2) Delineation of natural geographical boundaries; (3) Mixed population as limited as possible; (4) Preservation of independent access routes to East and West Jerusalem, to allow reaching each part of the Jerusalem metropolis on either side without passing through the other part of the metropolis.

Core region: westerly − along the Old City walls down to the southwestern corner. Southerly − along Hinnom Valley south of the city walls, along the gorge up to the wall surrounding the monastery of Akeldama. From there, north to the eastern wall of Church of St. Peter in Gallicantu. From there, along the southern wall of the Old City up to the Southern Wall excavations at the southwestern limit of the Ophel, where the city wall turns north. (Ophel Garden). From there, to the Valley of Josaphat up to the Ras al-Amud road – including the Mount of Olives Jewish Cemetery.

Easterly – along the Jewish burial plots on Mount of Olives up to the section of the wall of the Holy Trinity Cathedral next to the Chapel of the Ascension, up to Makassed Hospital which is not part of the basin, whose boundaries follow the wall of Church of Viri Galilaei. Northerly – from Viri Galilaei Church, to the northeast corner of the Old City wall, then westwards along the wall up to the Schmidt School compound (which is not part of the basin) and along the city wall up to its northwest corner on Jaffa Road. In total, a sum of 2,012 acres.

=== Population and land distribution ===
According to the Jerusalem Institute for Israel Studies, in late 2003, 35,400 residents lived in the Old City, and in the entire Holy Basin around 40,000. In the Old City, 73% of the residents were Muslims, 18% Christians, and 9% were Jews. Out of 6,000 families who live in the Old City, 68% are Muslim, 24% Christian, and 8% are Jewish.

Out of 900 acres where the Old City is situated, about 210 acres are owned by the Jerusalem Waqf (24%, most of it on the Temple Mount, an area of approximately 144 acres); about 270 acres owned by the Christian churches and monasteries (30%); 250 acres of Arab private land ownership (28%), and about 170 acres owned by the state (18%).

About half the lands of the Old City are being used for residence, 280 acres are being used for religious and educational institutions, and 80 acres for trade. Archaeological sites stretch over 50 acres, and there are also 40 acres that are not being used.

== Geo-political disputes ==
The Holy Basin is not only the center of Jerusalem, but also in the center of the Arab–Israeli conflict, and any negligible controversy may turn into an international incident. The latest example for such incident was the uproar against the Rescue excavations at the Mughrabi Gate in early 2007, an event that joins a series of events, some of which included casualties.

In 2006, the Jerusalem Institute for Israel Studies, headed by Ruth Lapidot, conducted a research on alternatives to the sovereignty over the Holy Basin. According to this study there are five solutions to the Holy Basin:

- The first alternative offers full control and sovereignty of the State of Israel over all the Holy basin, while providing some autonomy to the Palestinians. The meaning of this proposal is practically the institutionalization of the current situation on the ground, where Muslim and Christian clerics run their own institutions autonomously.
- The second alternative is radically different – sovereignty and full control of the Palestinians over all the Holy Basin, with an autonomy to Jewish residents.
- The third alternative offers a territorial partition between the parties with international supervision.
- Fourth alternative offers co-management, and the division of power between the two parties with international backing.
- The fifth alternative: the management of the Holy Basin would be run by an international body as one unit. The international body will not only hold supervisory authority and control, but will also be responsible for managing the Holy Basin, and will be the source of authority and control in the Holy Basin.

The researchers Kobi Michael and Dr Moshe Hirsch presented a study in which the option that is most applicable is rather the model based on West Berlin – an area managed as an autonomous entity under international supervision – agreed upon all parties.
