= Hanoch Zeibert =

Israeli rabbi, politician, and mayor

Hanoch Zeibert חנוך זייברט
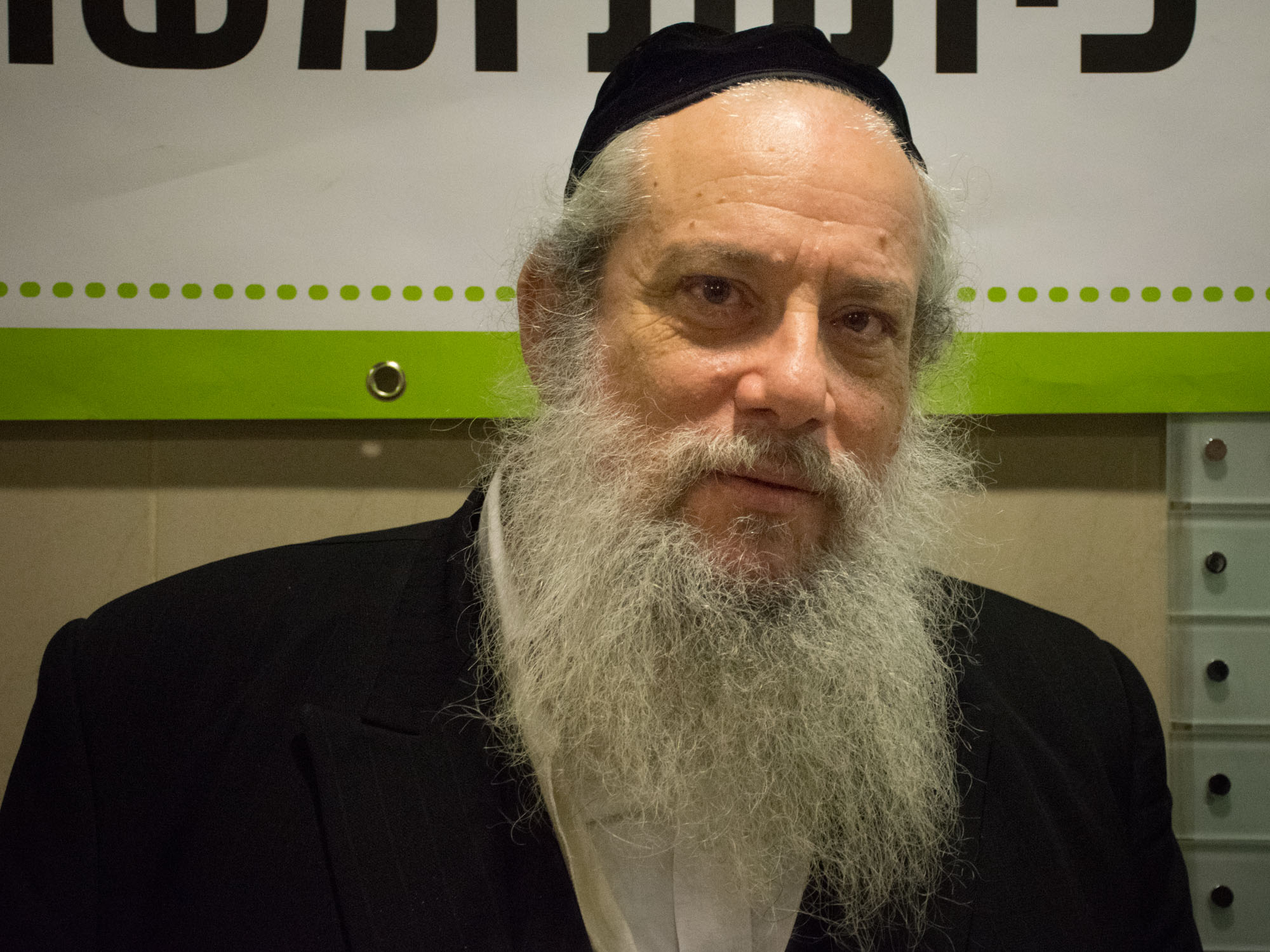

15th Mayor of Bnei Brak
- Incumbent
- Assumed office 19 March 2024
- Preceded by: Avraham Rubinstein
- In office October 22, 2013 – November 2018
- Preceded by: Avraham Rubinstein
- Succeeded by: Avraham Rubinstein

Personal details
- Born: 30 July 1960 (age 66) Bnei Brak, Israel
- Party: Agudat Yisrael

Hanoch Zeibert (Hebrew: חנוך זייברט; born July 30, 1960) is an Israeli rabbi, politician and the (fifteen) mayor of the Israeli city of Bnei Brak.

== Biography ==
Zeibert was born in Bnei Brak to Gur Hasidic parents. Upon his Marriage he moved to Ashdod. Since 2009 Zeibert lives in Bnei Brak and married with twelve children.

Zeibert served as Deputy Mayor from the United Torah Judaism and Chairman of the Subcommittee for Planning and Construction. When the Illegal African immigrants are settled in Neighbourhood of Pardes Katz, Deputy Mayor Zeibert and the Members of the Bnei Brak City Council, convened in November 21, 2010 with top activists in the struggle in order to find ways to deal with the phenomenon. In 2013 elections he ran for the "Central Torah list" (UTJ) party, won the support of all the ultra-Orthodox parties overwhelmingly elected mayor of Bnei Brak with approximately 94% of votes.

In 2018 elections he was replaced as Central Torah list candidate by Avraham Rubinstein of Degel HaTorah, will Zeibert served as deputy Mayor.

Zeibert was elected as mayor once again in the 2024 Israeli municipal elections as Central Torah list candidate, defatting Uriel Buso of Shas Party with 59% of the votes.
