= Limor Son Har-Melech =

Israeli settler and politician

- לימור סון הר-מלך
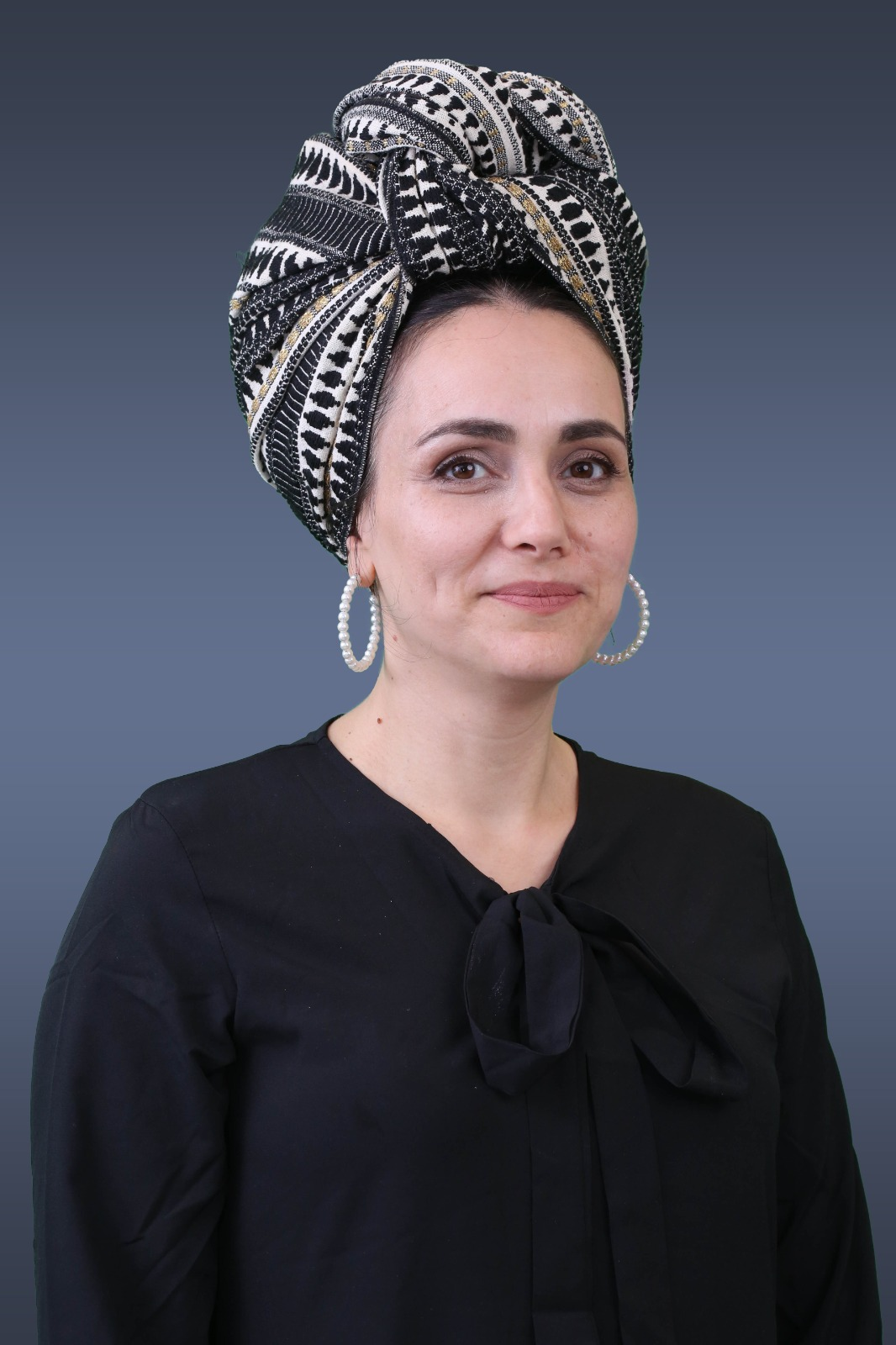
- Official portrait, 2022

Faction represented in the Knesset
- 2022–: Otzma Yehudit

Personal details
- Born: Limor Elmaleh; 30 July 1979 (age 47) Jerusalem
- Party: Otzma Yehudit
- Other political affiliations: Homesh First
- Spouse(s): Shalom Har-Melech (m. 2001; died 2003) Yehuda Son (m. 2006)
- Children: 10
- Parent(s): Nissim Elmaleh (father); Shoshana Beit Eini (mother)

Limor Son Har-Melech (Hebrew: לימור סון הר-מלך; born 30 July 1979) is an Israeli politician. She has been serving as a member of the Knesset for the Otzma Yehudit party following the 2022 Israeli legislative election.

A former resident of the West Bank settlement of Homesh prior to the 2005 disengagement, Son Har-Melech co-founded an organization seeking to rebuild the outpost. In 2003, Son Har-Melech was severely wounded, and her husband murdered, in an attack by Palestinian militants during the Second Intifada.

== Early life and personal biography ==
Limor Son Har-Melech was born as Limor Elmaleh in Jerusalem in 1979. Her maternal grandparents were Iraqi-Jews. Her grandmother grew up in Baghdad and personally experienced the Farhud pogrom of June 1941.

In 2001, she married her first husband, Shalom "Shuli" Har-Melech, and moved with him to Homesh, an Israeli outpost in the West Bank, where he was a medic and an ambulance driver, and they had a son together.

In August 2003, during the Second Intifada, while she was seven months pregnant with her second child, her husband and she were driving in a car near Ramallah on the West Bank when five gunmen fired upon their vehicle with automatic weapons and the vehicle rolled over. Shuli died instantly, whilst Limor was in critical condition, and her daughter was born prematurely by caesarean section several hours later. Al-Aqsa Martyrs' Brigades, a Palestinian militant organization described as the military wing of the Palestinian political party Fatah, claimed responsibility for the attack.

In 2005, Har-Melech and her family, along with the rest of the residents of Homesh, were evicted from their homes during the Israeli disengagement from Gaza and some West Bank towns, with the settlement being demolished. In 2023, a video of Har-Melech in 2005, encouraging her then 2-year-old son as he vowed to "kill the Arabs", was published. Har-Melech married her current husband, Yehuda Son, in 2006 and had a further eight children with him. They moved out of temporary accommodation into a house in the Shavei Shomron settlement after her seventh child.

== Political career ==
Son Har-Melech co-founded the grassroots organization Homesh First, which seeks to re-build the outpost she had lived in until 2005. In the 2022 Israeli legislative election, Son Har-Melech was chosen for the thirteenth spot on the Religious Zionist Party-Otzma Yehudit list. As the list won fourteen mandates, Son Har-Melech was successfully elected to the Knesset.

In 2023, Son Har-Melech introduced legislation to ban the waving of Palestinian flags on Israeli college campuses. She sponsored legislation to change the penal code to include rape against men in the legal definition of rape. It passed the Knesset in April 2025. She stated: "rape is rape, regardless of gender."

Son Har-Melech was appointed the head of the Knesset's Health Committee in December 2025, replacing Shas MK Yonatan Mishraki, pending approval by the House Committee. Her appointment was approved several days later. Mishraki returned to head the committee in February 2026.

=== Political views ===
Son Har-Melech has echoed accusations that the leadership of the Israel Defense Forces (IDF) privileges the safety of Palestinians in the West Bank over Israeli settlers. In 2023, she claimed that the then-Minister of Defense Yoav Gallant "knowingly endangers" settlers, and should be replaced in office, and endorsed similar comments by Likud MK Avihai Boaron.

On criminal justice issues, Son Har-Melech has argued that sentences for Arabs who kill Jews should be harsher than sentences for Jews who kill Arabs. In an interview with Ynet radio, Son Har-Melech said that a Jew who murders an Arab should receive life imprisonment, while any Arab "who kills a Jew needs to die".

During a May 2025 Knesset discussion on the Gaza humanitarian crisis, when an Israeli doctor argued that in Gaza "a 4-year-old whose arm has been amputated" should receive painkillers, Son Har-Melech responded: "The only treatment needed here is for you", in reference to the doctor. When a Nir Oz resident whose parents were kidnapped during 7 October (one of whom was later killed, and one of whom was later released) commented that "starving children [in Gaza] is not something we can be proud of", Son Har-Melech responded by reprimanding him, declaring it "horrific that you're talking about starvation when our children were butchered so cruelly. I wouldn't expect you to bring [starvation] up"; when starvation was later discussed, Son Har-Melech declared: "No one is starving anyone – stop echoing Hamas lies!"

Son Har-Melech is supportive of introducing the death penalty for terrorists in Israel. She sponsored and brought the bill to the Knesset, which passed the first reading on 10 November 2025. Over Purim on 3 March 2026 she posed on a photo posted on social media with a noose and syringe in a celebration of those execution methods.

== Personal life ==
Limor Son Har-Melech and her husband Yehuda Son live in the West Bank settlement of Shavei Shomron. She has ten children, two (Ahoviya Yair and Sarah) with her deceased husband, and eight with her second and current husband (Uri Shalom; Tamar Miriam; Naomi; Ayla; Avraham; Erga Tova; Noam Mordechai and a daughter born in 2021).
