= Alon Davidi =

Mayor of Sderot, Israel (born 1973)

- אלון דוידי
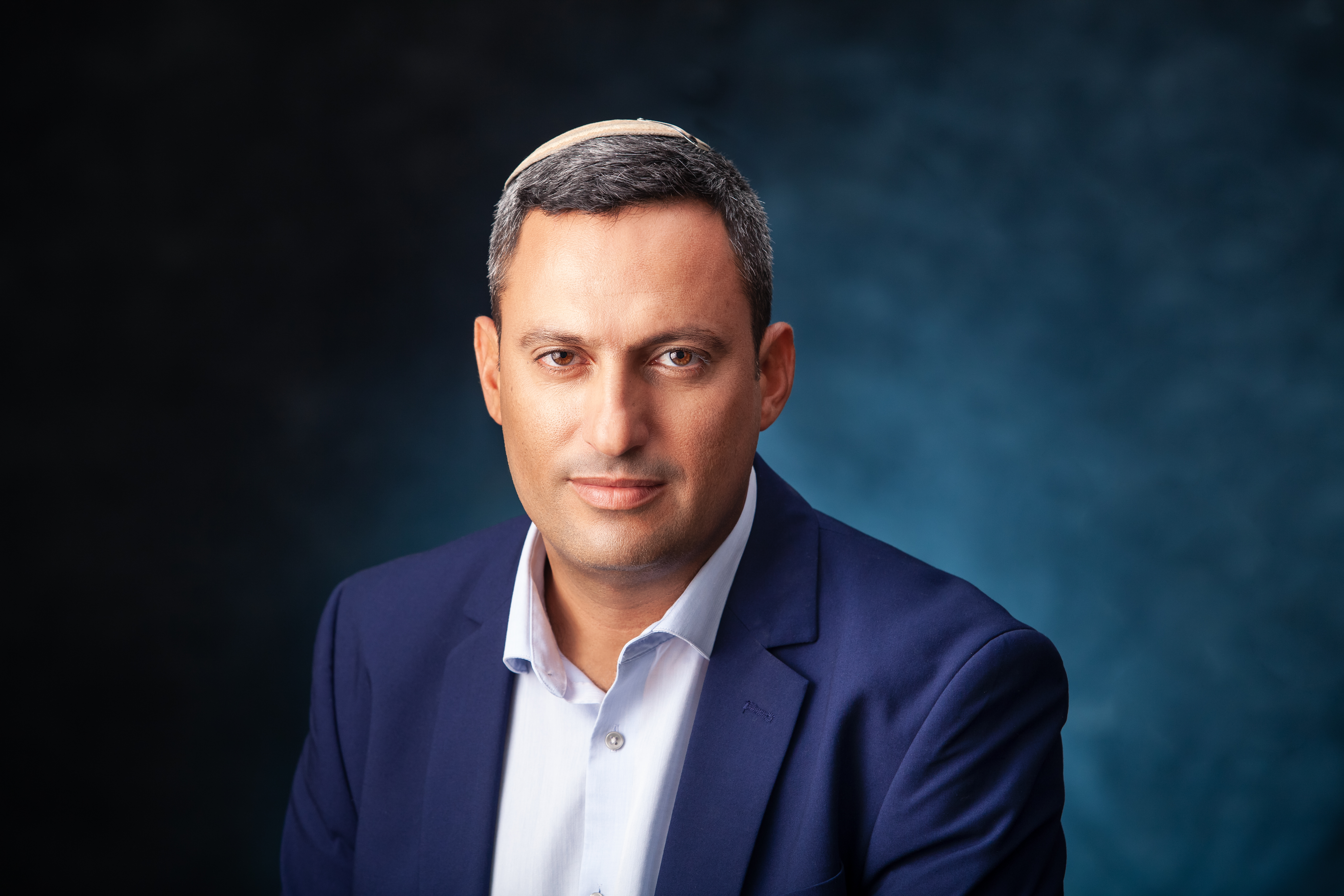
- Davidi in 2018

Mayor of Sderot
- Incumbent
- Assumed office 2013

Personal details
- Born: 18 October 1973 (age 53)

Alon Davidi (Hebrew: אלון דוידי; born 18 October 1973) is an Israeli politician. He has been mayor of Sderot since 2013.

== Political career ==
Ahead of the 2021 Israeli legislative election, he announced on 31 January 2021 that he would leave Likud and join Yamina. He was placed in the third slot of the Yamina list ahead of the election. He resigned before the new Knesset was sworn in and the seat was given to Idit Silman, who was placed eighth on the party's list.
