= Homesh First =

Israeli settlement organization

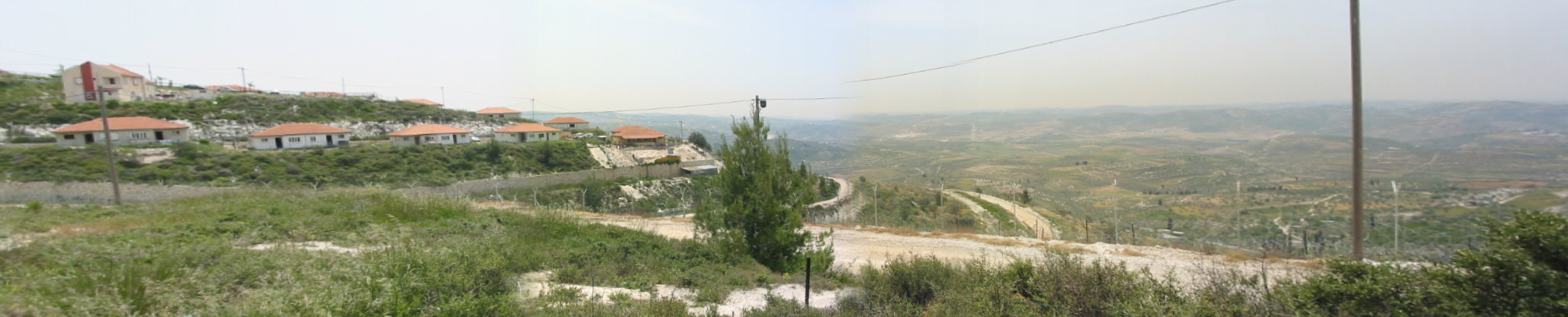
View from Homesh

Homesh First is an Israeli grassroots organization attempting to rebuild and resettle the Jewish community and Israeli settlement of Homesh in the West Bank.

== History ==
Homesh First was created by Limor Son Har-Melech and other former Jewish residents of Homesh, after their homes were razed and Jewish community was evicted as part of Israel's disengagement in August 2005. The Christian Science Monitor quoted Yossi Dagan, the future leader of Homesh First, warning that by these actions, "You'll be creating a terror state that would threaten most of the country with Qassam [missiles]."

== Civil disobedience campaigns ==
Homesh First organized the 2007 Yom Ha'atzmaut march to Homesh. This march attracted several thousand people. For the 2007 observance of Sukkot, Homesh First has announced that it was organizing, "a mass pilgrimage to the site of the former West Bank settlement of Homesh." The Israel Defense Forces and the Israeli police have evacuated Homesh First activists from Homesh on many occasions. Homesh Firsters flee into nearby hills and caves to wait for the security forces to leave and at other times they obediently leave only to return later.

== Homesh Knesset caucus ==
In August 2007, a 10-member Homesh Knesset caucus met for the first time. This group is headed by MK Aryeh Eldad. The caucus's mandate is to work to promote the reestablishment of Homesh - as a first step towards the return to all the places from which Jews were expelled during the Disengagement Plan of 2005. The group will work to build the legitimacy of the Homesh First group and support the resettlement of the northwestern West Bank. Yossi Dagan, the leader of Homesh First, said that this achievement is a "significant milestone towards the return to Homesh." In September 2007, the Knesset's Homesh caucus canceled their planned trip to Homesh due to the army having banned reporters from joining them. MK Arye Eldad argued with the IDF in an attempt to enter Homesh with reporters. He was accompanied by MK Uri Ariel and MK Yuli-Yoel Edelstein. These three MKs are from the 10 member caucus created in August. The three had planned to visit Homesh to visit with dozens of grassroots activists from Homesh First who are camped out at Homesh.

== See also ==
- Realignment plan
- Samaria
- Shomron Regional Council
