= Bnei Brak =

Bnei Brak בְּנֵי בְּרַק (Hebrew)
- City
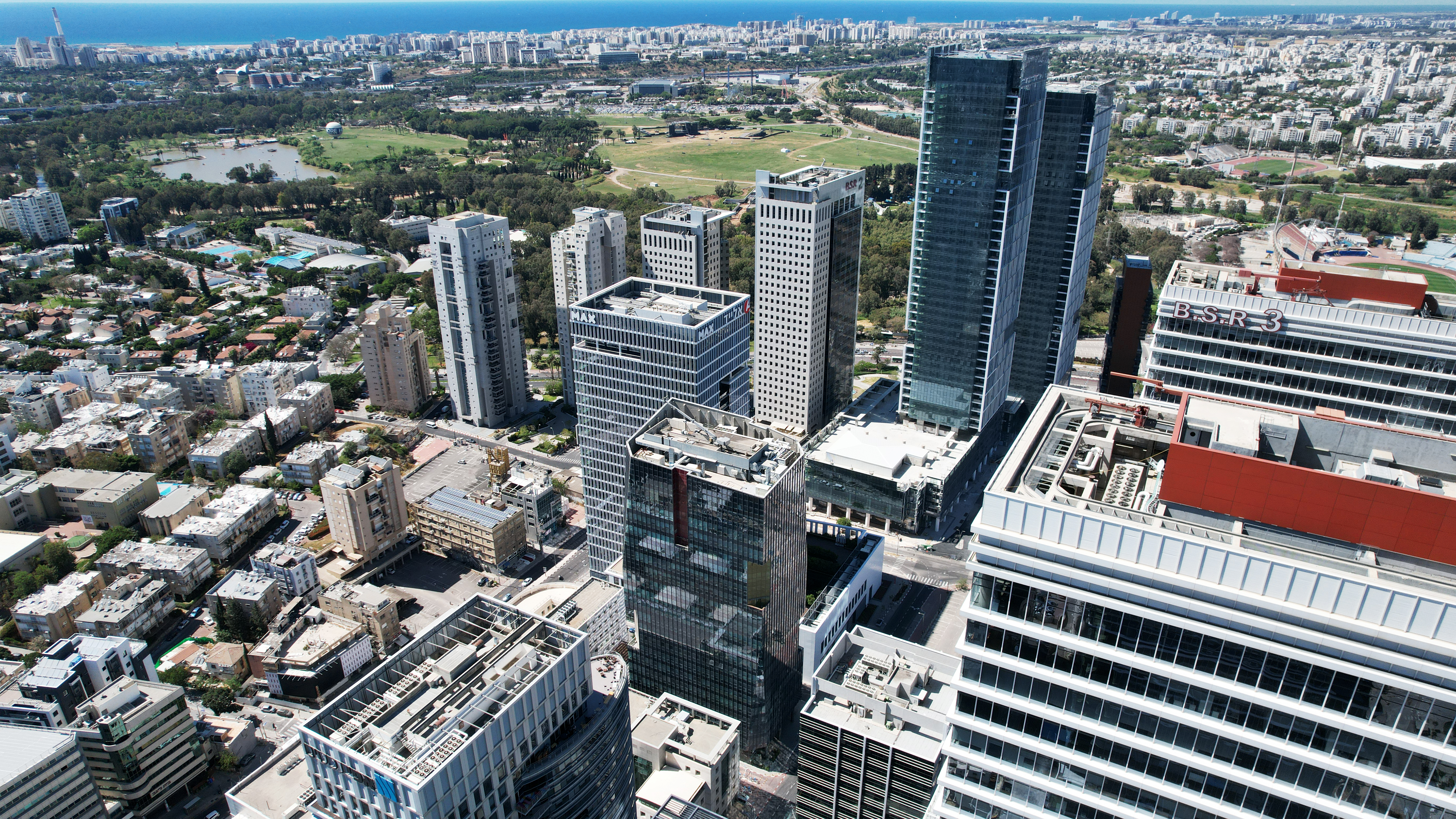
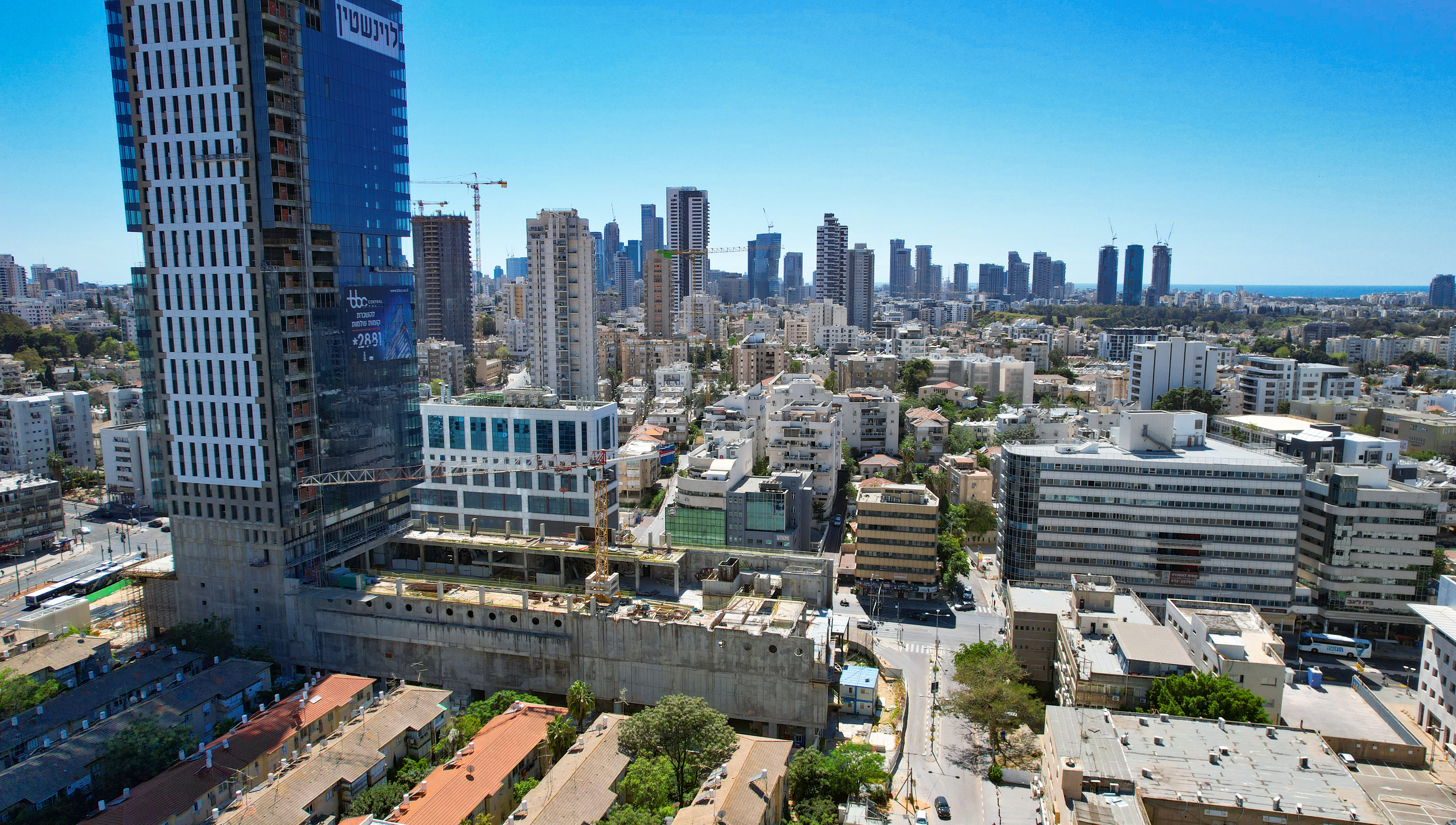
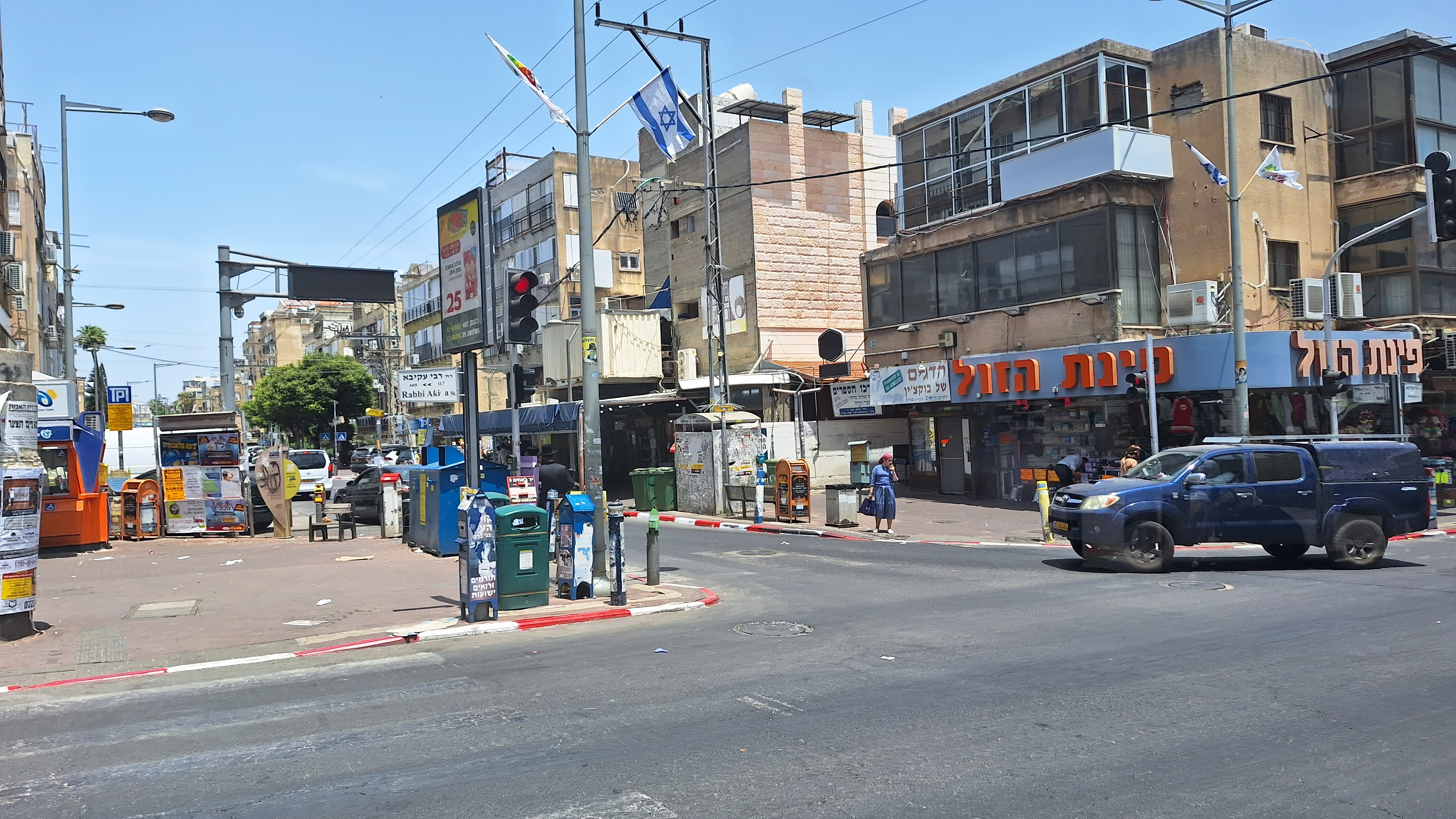
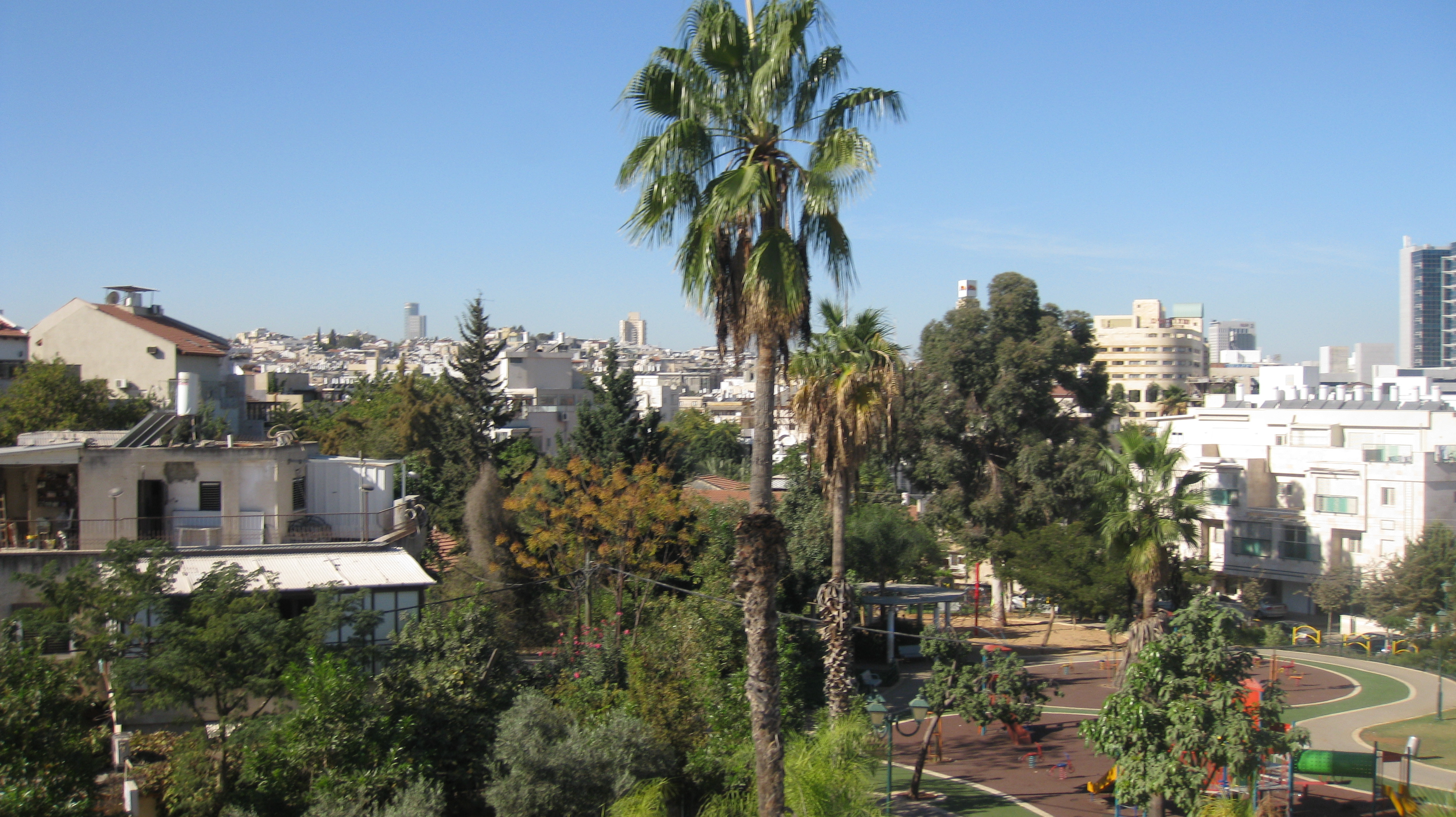
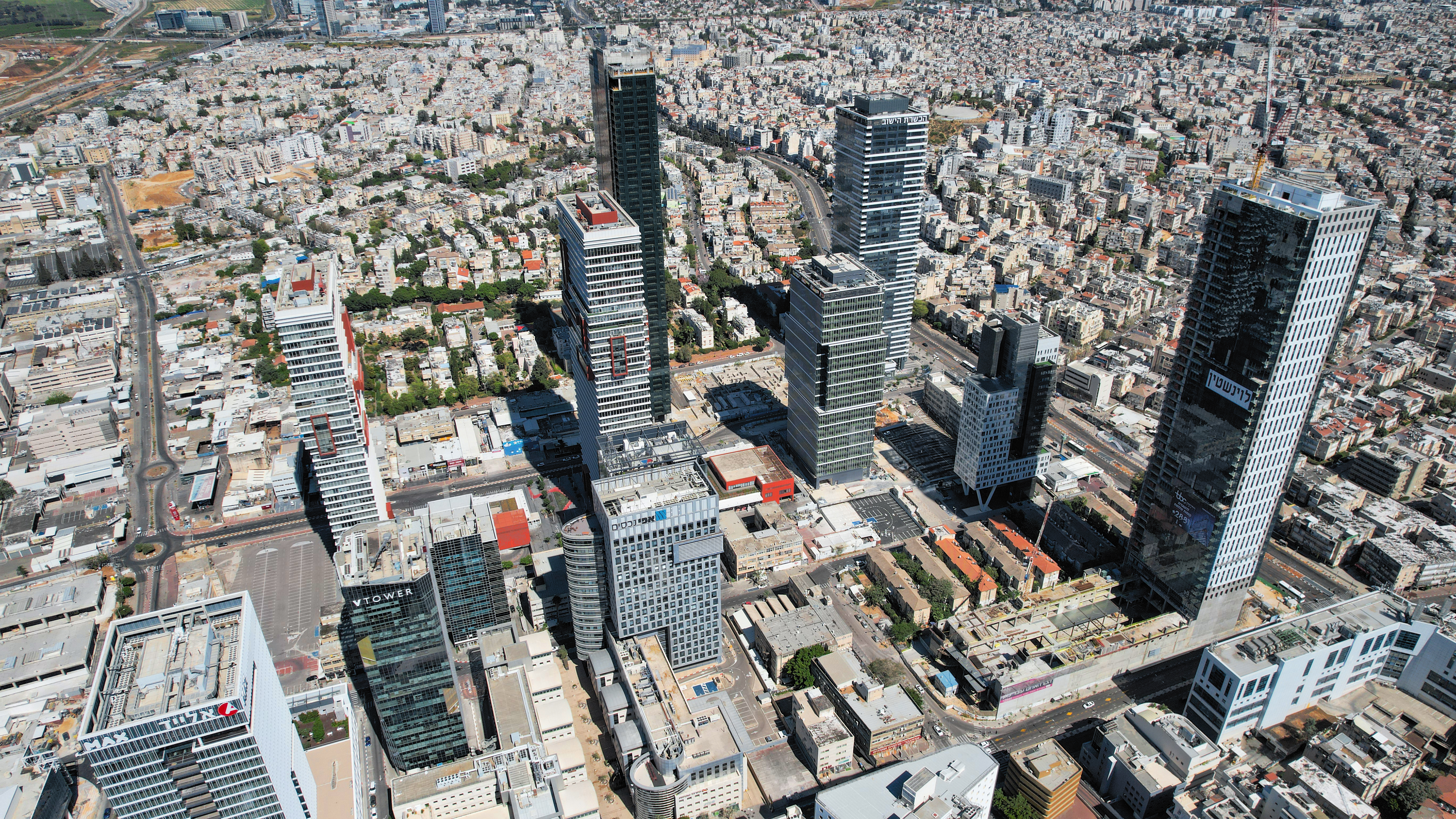

- Flag Coat of arms
- Interactive map of Bnei Brak
- Location within Central Israel Location within Israel
- Coordinates: 32°05′N 34°50′E
- Country: Israel
- District: Tel Aviv
- Natural Region: Ramat Gan
- Founded: 1924

Government
  - Type: Mayor–council
  - Body: Municipality of Bnei Brak
  - Mayor: Hanoch Zeibert

Area
  - Total: 7,088 dunams (7.088 km^{2}; 2.737 sq mi)

Population (2024)
  - Total: 229,996
  - Density: 32,450/km^{2} (84,040/sq mi)
- Demonym: Bnei Brakian

Ethnicity
  - Jews and others: 99.9%
  - Arabs: 0.1%
- Time zone: UTC+2 (IST)
  - Summer (DST): UTC+3 (IDT)
- Website: www.bnei-brak.muni.il

Bnei Brak (Hebrew: בְּנֵי בְּרַק (audio)), or Bene Beraq, is a city located on the central Mediterranean coastal plain in Israel, just east of Tel Aviv. A center of Haredi Judaism, Bnei Brak covers an area of 709 hectares (1,752 acres, or 2.74 square miles), and had a population of 229,996 in 2024. It is the most densely populated city in Israel and the seventh-most densely populated city in the world.

== History ==
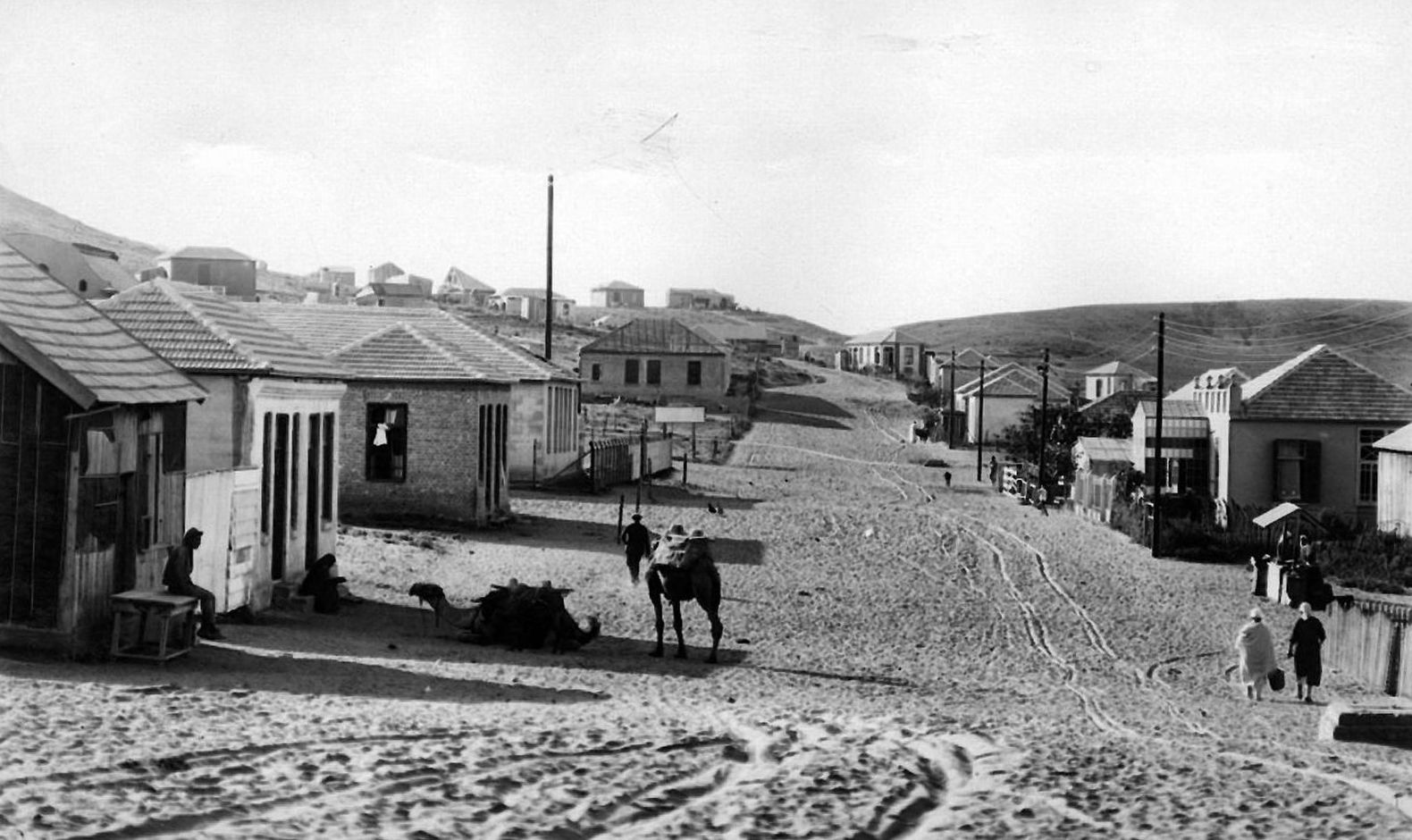
Main street of Bnei Brak in 1928

Bnei Brak takes its name from the ancient Biblical city of Beneberak, mentioned in Joshua 19:45 in the Hebrew Bible in a long list of towns within the allotment of the tribe of Dan. Bnei Brak was founded in 1924 as an agricultural village by eight Polish Hasidic families who had come to Mandatory Palestine as part of the Fourth Aliyah. Yitzchok Gerstenkorn led them. It was founded about 4 kilometres (2.5 mi) from the site of the Biblical Beneberak.

Bnei Brak was originally a moshava, and the primary economic activity was the cultivation of citrus fruits. Due to a lack of land, many of the founders turned to other occupations, and the village began to develop an urban character. Arye Mordechai Rabinowicz, formerly rabbi of Kurów in Poland, was the first rabbi. He was succeeded by Yosef Kalisz, a scion of the Vurker dynasty. The town was set up as a religious settlement from the outset, as is evident from this description of the pioneers:

Their souls were revived by the fact that they merited what their predecessors had not. What particularly revived their weary souls in the mornings and toward evening, when they would gather in the beth midrash (Jewish study hall) situated in a special shack that was built immediately upon the arrival of the very first settlers, for tefilla betzibbur (communal prayer) three times a day, for the Daf Yomi shiur (Torah lesson) and a Gemara shiur and an additional one in Mishnayos and the Shulchan Aruch."

In 1928, the Great Synagogue was completed, and the village committee celebrated its inauguration by presenting statistics noting its development over the past four years. Bnei Brak, with a population of about 800 residents, covered about 2,000 dunams, including about 800 dunams which were citrus groves. It had 116 houses, 31 huts, six public buildings, and 48 cowsheds. In the summer of 1929, Bnei Brak was connected to the electricity grid. In the 1931 census of Palestine, the population of Benei Beraq was 956, all Jewish, in 255 houses. In 1940, it had 4,500 residents and 25 factories. In 1948, the population was 9,300. Bnei Brak achieved city status in 1950.

In April 2020, the entire city of Bnei Brak was quarantined due to the COVID-19 pandemic. On 29 March 2022, a Palestinian terrorist killed five people.

In February 2026, clashes broke out in Bnei Brak after ultra-Orthodox residents confronted security personnel and attacked uniformed soldiers, reportedly amid longstanding tensions over the presence of military personnel in Haredi neighborhoods. Eyal Zamir, Chief of Staff of the Israel Defense Forces, condemned the incident as a “serious crossing of a red line” and called for firm action against those responsible.

== Rabbinic presence ==
Avrohom Yeshaya Karelitz (the Chazon Ish) emigrated from Belarus to Bnei Brak in its early days, and attracted a large following there. Leading rabbis who have lived in Bnei Brak include Yaakov Landau, Eliyahu Eliezer Dessler, Yaakov Yisrael Kanievsky ("the Steipler"), Yosef Shlomo Kahaneman (Ponevezher Rov), Elazar Menachem Mann Shach, Michel Yehuda Lefkowitz, Aharon Yehuda Leib Shteinman, Nissim Karelitz, Shmuel Wosner and Chaim Kanievsky. In the early 1950s, the Vizhnitzer Rebbe, Chaim Meir Hager, founded a large neighborhood in Bnei Brak which continued to serve as a dynastic center under his son, Moshe Yehoshua Hager, and under his grandsons, Yisrael Hager and Menachem Mendel Hager.

Beginning in the 1960s, the rebbes of the Ukrainian Ruzhin dynasty (Sadigura, Husiatyn and Bohush) who had formerly lived in Tel Aviv, moved to Bnei Brak. In the 1990s, they were followed by the rebbe of Modzhitz. Unlike the former four Gerrer rebbes, who lived in Jerusalem, the current rebbe was a Bnei Brak resident until 2012. The rebbes of Alexander, Biala-Bnei-Brak, Koidenov, Machnovke, Nadvorne, Premishlan, Radzin, Shomer Emunim, Slonim-Schwarze, Strykov, Tchernobil, Trisk-Bnei-Brak and Zutshke also reside in Bnei Brak. Moshe Yehuda Leib Landau was the Rabbi of Bnei Brak until his death on March 30, 2019. He was a respected authority on halakha (Jewish law) and kashrut (kosher supervision). The "Rav Landau" hechsher (kosher certification) is widely accepted. Nissim Karelitz, chief rabbi (av beis din) of the Lithuanian Haredi community, heads a beth din (rabbinical court) of Lithuanian and Hasidic dayanim, called She'eris Yisroel.

== Demographics ==
Historical population
Year	Pop.	±% p.a.
1931	956	—
1948	9,300	+14.32%
1955	28,000	+17.05%
1961	47,000	+9.02%
1972	75,700	+4.43%
1983	96,100	+2.19%
1995	130,700	+2.60%
2008	151,800	+1.16%
2012	168,800	+2.69%
2018	198,900	+2.77%
2022	214,444	+1.90%
2026	242,192	+3.09%
Source: CBS

According to figures by the municipality of Bnei Brak, the city has a population of over 181,000 residents, the majority of whom are Haredi Jews. In the 2021 Israeli legislative election, 89% of the voters chose Haredi parties. Pardes Katz, a neighborhood of about 30,000 inhabitants in northern Bnei Brak, is the sole neighborhood of the city where the majority of residents are not Haredi. In 2022, Bnei Brak was ranked Israel's most densely populated city, with 28,000 people per square kilometer.

== Mayors ==
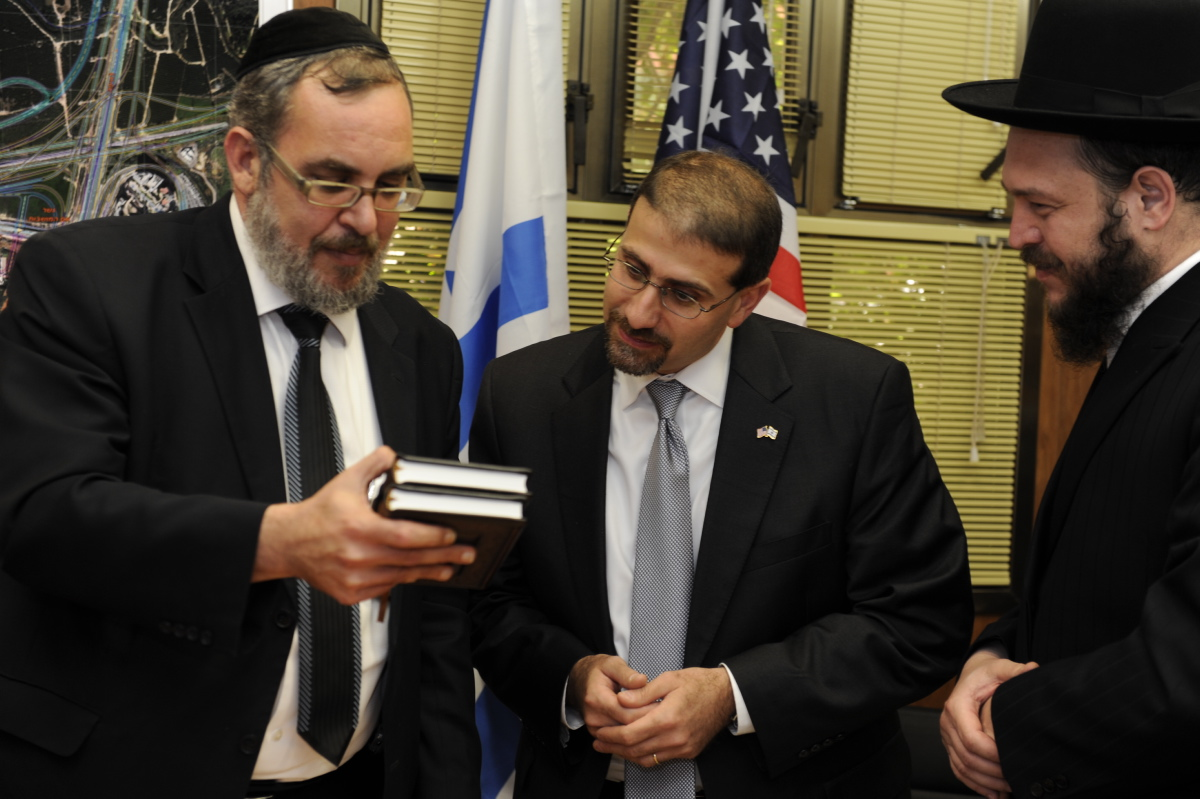
Former Bnei Brak mayor Ya'akov Asher (left) meets with U.S. Ambassador Dan Shapiro (center)

- Yitzchok Gerstenkorn: 1939–1954
- Moshe Begno: 1954
- Reuven Aharonovich: 1954–1957, 1959–1966
- Shimon Soroka: 1968–1969
- Yitzchok Meir: 1974–1976
- Shmuel Weinberg: 1966–1968, 1978–1983
- Moshe Irenstein: 1983–1990, 1993–1995
- Yerachmiel Boyer: 1991–1993
- Mordechai Karelitz: 1998–2003
- Yissochor Frankenthal: 2003–2008
- Ya'akov Asher: 2008–2013
- Hanoch Zeibert: 2013–2018
- Avraham Rubinstein: 2018–2024
- Hanoch Zeibert: 2024–present

== Economy ==
One of the landmarks of Bnei Brak is the Coca-Cola bottling plant in Kahaneman St. It is owned by the Central Bottling Company (CBC), which has held the Israeli franchise for Coca-Cola products since 1968. It is among Coca-Cola's ten largest single-plant bottling facilities worldwide.

Two major factories which dominated the centre of Bnei Brak for many years were the Dubek cigarette factory and the Osem food factory. As the town grew they found themselves in the middle of a residential area, and both companies subsequently left the area. Osem's main factory is now located on Jabotinsky Road in Petah Tikva, just next to Bnei Brak.

In 2011, construction started on a business district, which will include 15 office towers. Several of the towers of the Bnei Brak Business Center are already built as of 2020, and other buildings won't be completed until after 2021.

== Transportation ==
=== Railways ===
Bnei Brak–Ramat HaHayal railway station opened in 1949 as "Tel Aviv North station". It was renamed to Bnei Braq station in 1954. After a decline in importance of rail transport culminating in the closure of the station in the 1990s, the station was refurbished and reopened in 2000. The tracks through the station were electrified with the Israeli standard 25 kV 50 Hz AC in late 2021. In 2019, over a million passengers used the station.

== Healthcare ==
Bnei Brak is home to Mayanei Hayeshua Medical Center (MHMC), a Haredi hospital. It is located on the east side of the city, on the outskirts of the Ramat Aharon and Or Haim neighborhoods. It serves the residents of Bnei Brak, along with nearby Giv'at Shmuel, Petah Tikva and Ramat Gan. Founded in 1990, MHMC's initially focus was maternity, and now it is a general care facility. It consists of 18 medical departments and 32 outpatient clinics, including 12 dialysis units, a high-risk pregnancy ward and a neonatal intensive care unit. With a 320-bed capacity, MHMC handles 13,000 births, and carries out more than 6,000 surgical procedures per annum. It features a six-story Mental Health Center, which sponsors an eating disorder clinic.

MHMC's affairs are managed in strict accordance with halakha. It has been managed by three distinct groups: A board of directors, an association of rabbis and public servants, and most influential of all, the "Halakhic Supervision Committee", a rabbinical committee consisting of Shmuel Wosner, Nissim Karelitz and Yitzchok Zilberstein, with Yisrael Rand, a confidant of Aharon Yehuda Leib Shteinman, serving as its secretary. Chaim Kanievsky was on its board of directors, as was Moshe Lion. If during any medical procedure there might arise some halakhic doubt, the medical staff will activate the halakhic team, which is headed by the hospital's rabbi. Only after the halakhic ruling is issued can the medical activity be carried out. MHMC has its own beth midrash on the premises.

== Culture and lifestyle ==
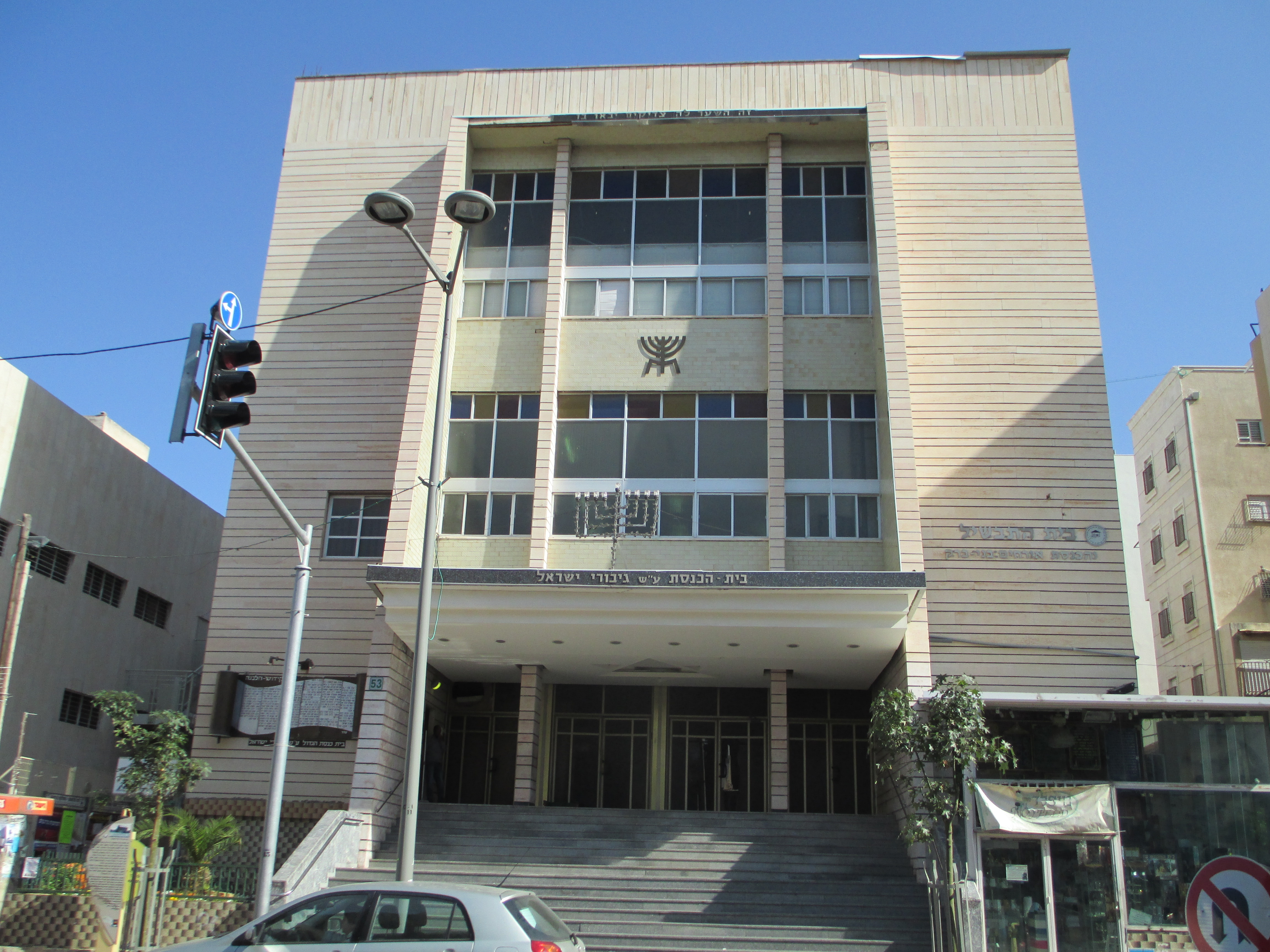
Synagogue in Bnei Brak

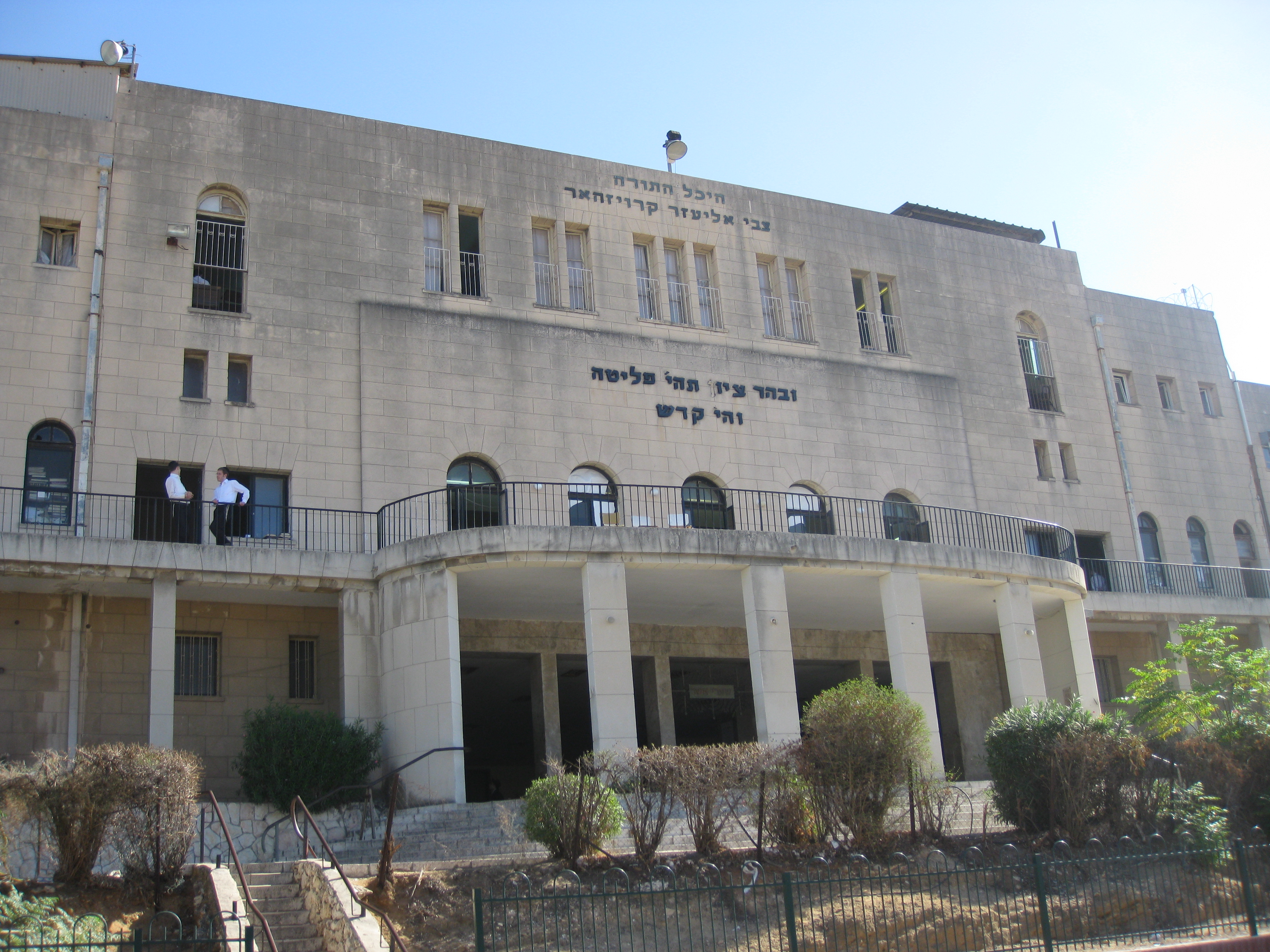
Ponevezh Yeshiva

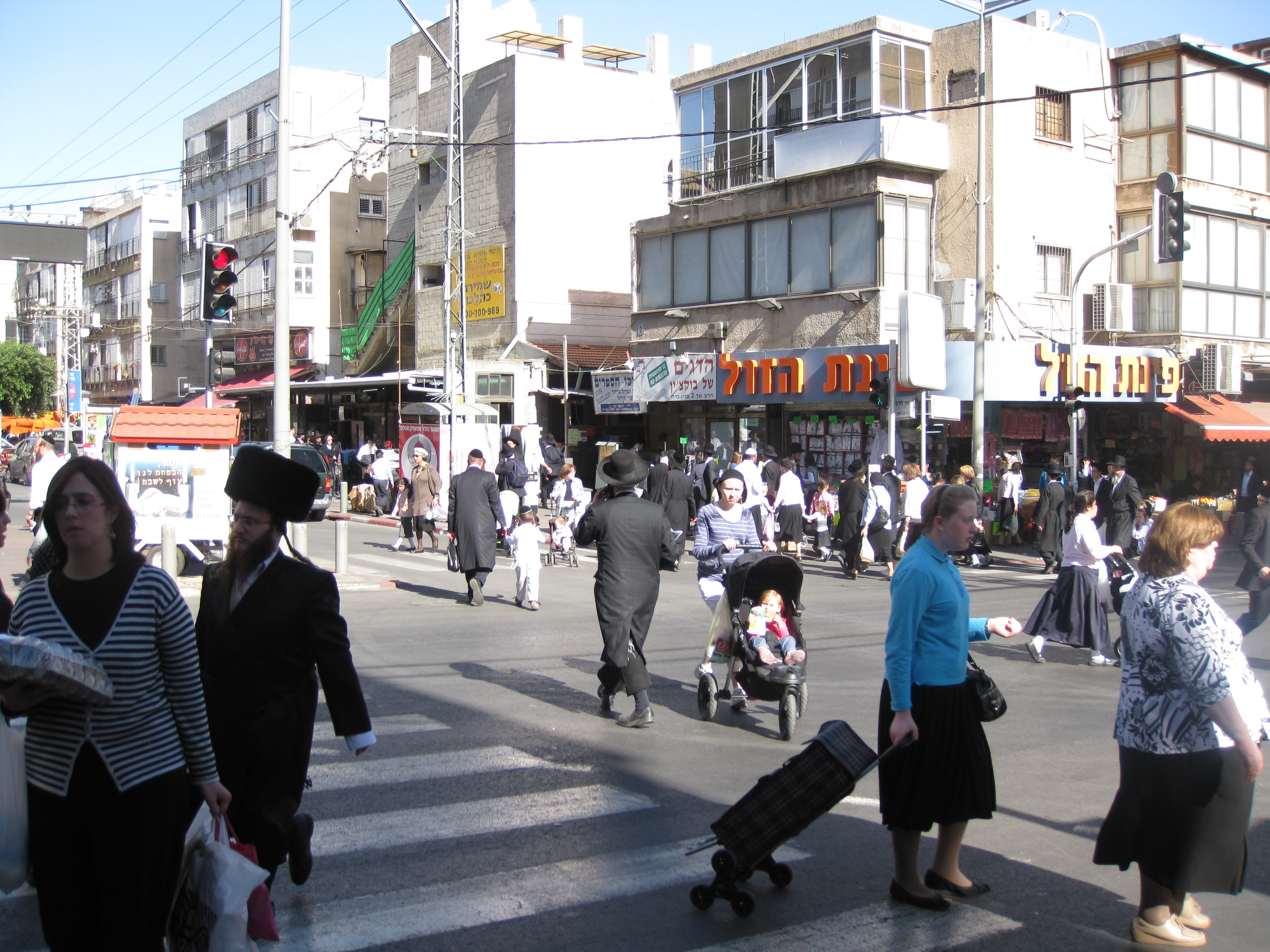
Hasidic Jews in Bnei Brak

After Mayor Gottlieb of the National Religious Party was defeated, Haredi parties grew in status and influence; since then they have governed the city. As the Haredi population grew, the demand for public religious observance increased and more residents requested the closure of their neighbourhoods to vehicular traffic on Shabbat. In a short period, most of Bnei Brak's secular and Religious Zionist residents migrated elsewhere, and the city has become almost homogeneously Haredi. The city had one non-Haredi neighborhood, Pardes Katz, but it too has had an influx of Haredim and is today predominantly Haredi. Some names of streets with a Zionist connotation were renamed for prominent Haredi figures, such as Herzl Street south of Jabotinsky Street, which was changed to HaRav Shach Street. Bnei Brak is one of the two poorest cities in Israel. A street in Bnei Brak was named after one of the town's founders who was a great-grandfather of murdered journalist Daniel Pearl.

Bnei Brak is home to Israel's first women-only department store, only one example of gender segregation in what is viewed as an ultra-orthodox city. Bnei Brak was home to one of the original gender-segregated bus lines that Israel's courts ruled were illegal. Mehadrin bus lines are a type of bus line in Israel that mostly ran in and/or between major Haredi population centers and in which gender segregation and other rigid religious rules observed by some ultra-Orthodox Jews were applied until 2011. In these sex-segregated buses, female passengers sat in the back of the bus and entered and exited the bus through the back door if possible, while the male passengers sat in the front part of the bus and entered and exited through the front door. Additionally, tzniut (modest dress) was often required for women, playing a radio or secular music on the bus was avoided, and advertisements were censored.

The Bnei Brak municipality set up an alternative water supply, for use on Shabbat and Jewish holidays. This supply, which does not require intervention by Jews on days of rest, avoids the problems associated with Jews working on the day of rest at Mekorot, the national water company. Most of the streets are closed on Shabbat and Jewish holidays.

Bnei Brak won national attention when it lost a battle to remove the photos of women candidates from Likud election ads. Orly Erez-Likhovski, legal advisor of the Israel Religious Action Center declared it a victory for gender equality:

I am very happy that the officials from the Likud didn't give up, fought the municipality and the police who first arrived on the scene. It shows that the message is starting to penetrate on every level that exclusion of women is illegal and unacceptable. It doesn't always translate to the people on the ground but we see that great progress is being made – even in Bnei Brak, even in the ultra-Orthodox sector. This is an important message.

In 2023, the Bnei Brak municipality made a loan of 20 million shekels to deal with the city's rat issue. Earlier that year in June, a toddler was bitten throughout by rats in bed and found covered by blood. She was then rushed to the hospital Mayanei Hayeshua Medical Center (MHMC). According to a city councilor, Yaakov Vidar of Likud, who ranked the city as one of the dirtiest in Israel, the mayor first denied there was a rat issue then had to admit the problem after the pressure from him and Idit Silman, the Minister of Environmental Protection, but the mayor claimed his words were merely a sarcastic joke. The causes of the rodents were attributed to mishandling of garbage and sewage, and the creepy feature of limestone and brittle concrete that were used to build the city. The municipality also blamed the construction of Tel Aviv Light Rail disturbed the underground rats and forced them to move to the city.

== Voting patterns ==
In the 2022 election, 98 percent of voters in Bnei Brak voted for the parties of the right-wing coalition led by Benjamin Netanyahu, while 2 percent voted for the parties of the center-left coalition led by Yair Lapid and 0.02 percent voted for the Arab parties. 90 percent of voters voted for the Haredi parties Shas or UTJ.

In the 2026 election, 94 percent of voters in Bnei Brak voted for the parties of the right-wing coalition led by Benjamin Netanyahu, while 2 percent voted for the parties of the center-left coalition led by Gadi Eisenkot and 0.03 percent voted for the Arab parties. 86 percent of voters voted for the Haredi parties Shas or UTJ. Voter turnout increased 11 percent from the 2022 election.

== Notable people of Bnei Brak ==
- Baruch Ashlag, kabbalist
- Mordechai David, far-right political activist
- Yisroel Hager, Vizhnitzer Rebbe in Kiryat Vizhnitz
- Chaim Kanievsky, leader of the ultra-orthodox Lithuanian Jews
- Avrohom Yeshaya Karelitz, worldwide posek
- Simon Leviev, conman
- Sesto Pals, writer
- Judea Pearl, professor
- Shuli Rand, actor, writer, singer
- Mary Schaps, mathematical scholar
- Elazar Menachem Man Shach, leader of the ultra orthodox Lithuanian Jews
- Dovid Shmidel, rabbi
- Aharon Yehuda Leib Shteinman, rabbi
- Motty Steinmetz, singer
- Tuvia Tenenbom, theater director and writer
- Michal Waldiger, Knesset Member in the Religious Zionist Party
- Ariel Ze'evi (born 1977), Olympic judoka

== International relations ==
=== Twin towns ===
Bnei Brak is twinned with:

- Lakewood, New Jersey, United States, since 2011

== Gallery ==
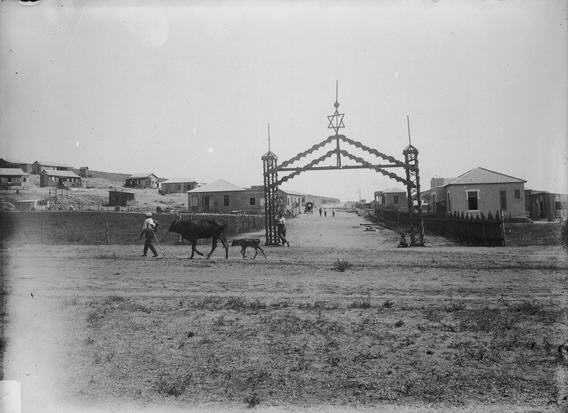
Bnei Brak 1925: "View of Colony with the Gate of Honor"

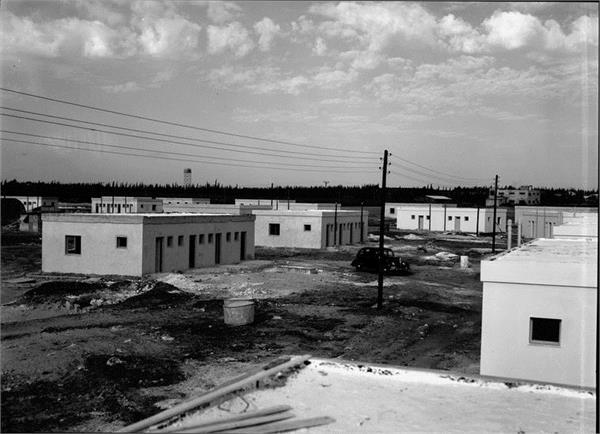
Bnei Brak 1928

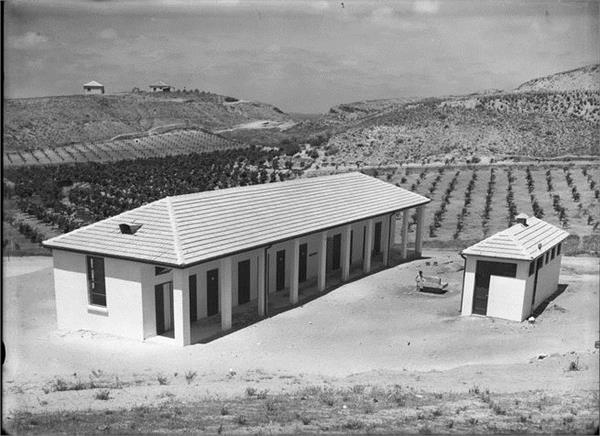
Bnei Brak, school 1931

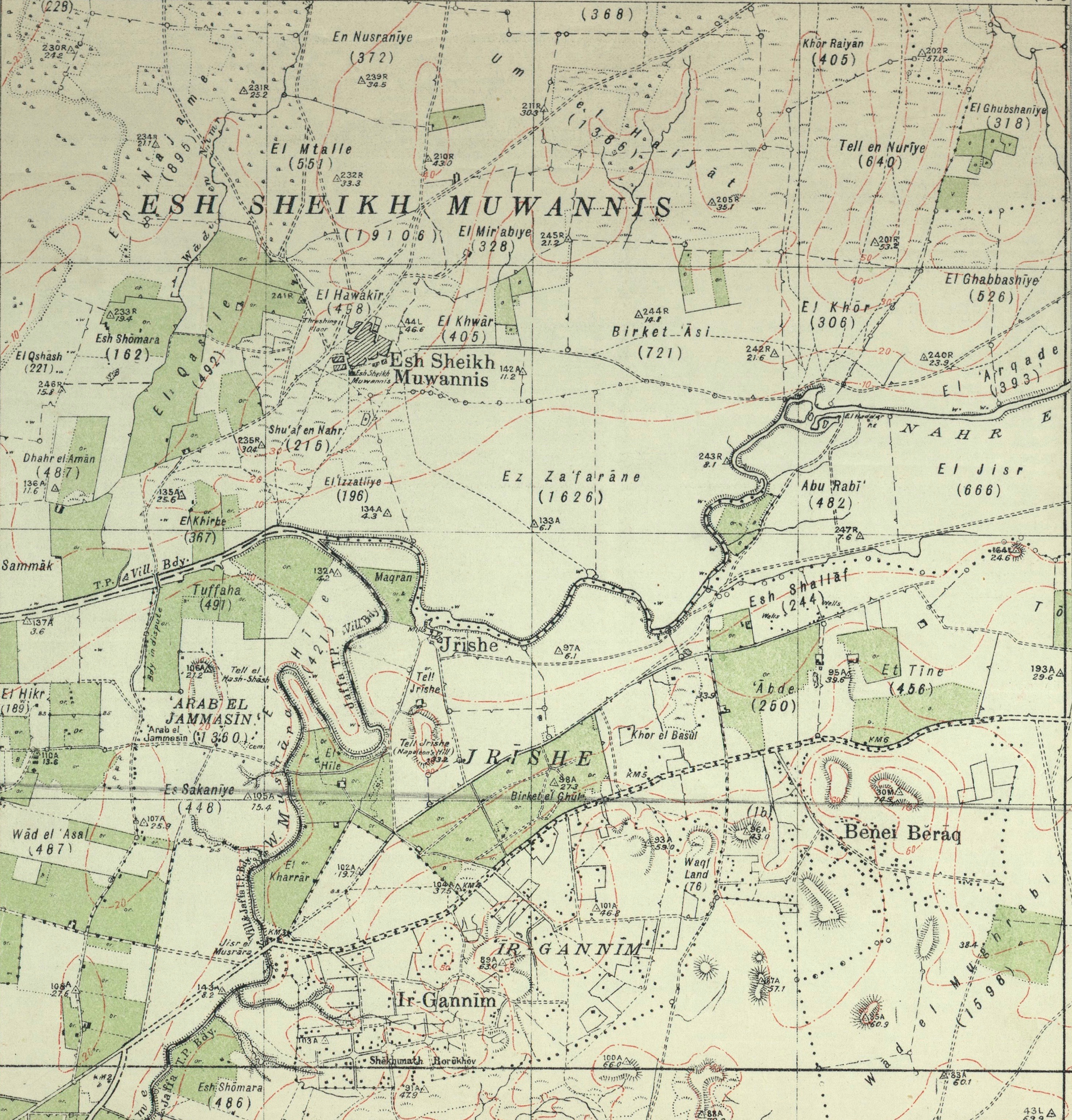
Bnei Brak (Benei Beraq) 1928 1:20,000

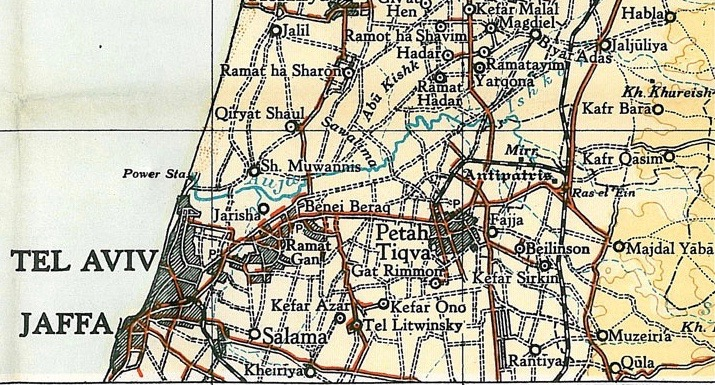
Bnei Brak (Benei Beraq) 1945 1:250,000
