= Uriel Buso =

Israeli politician

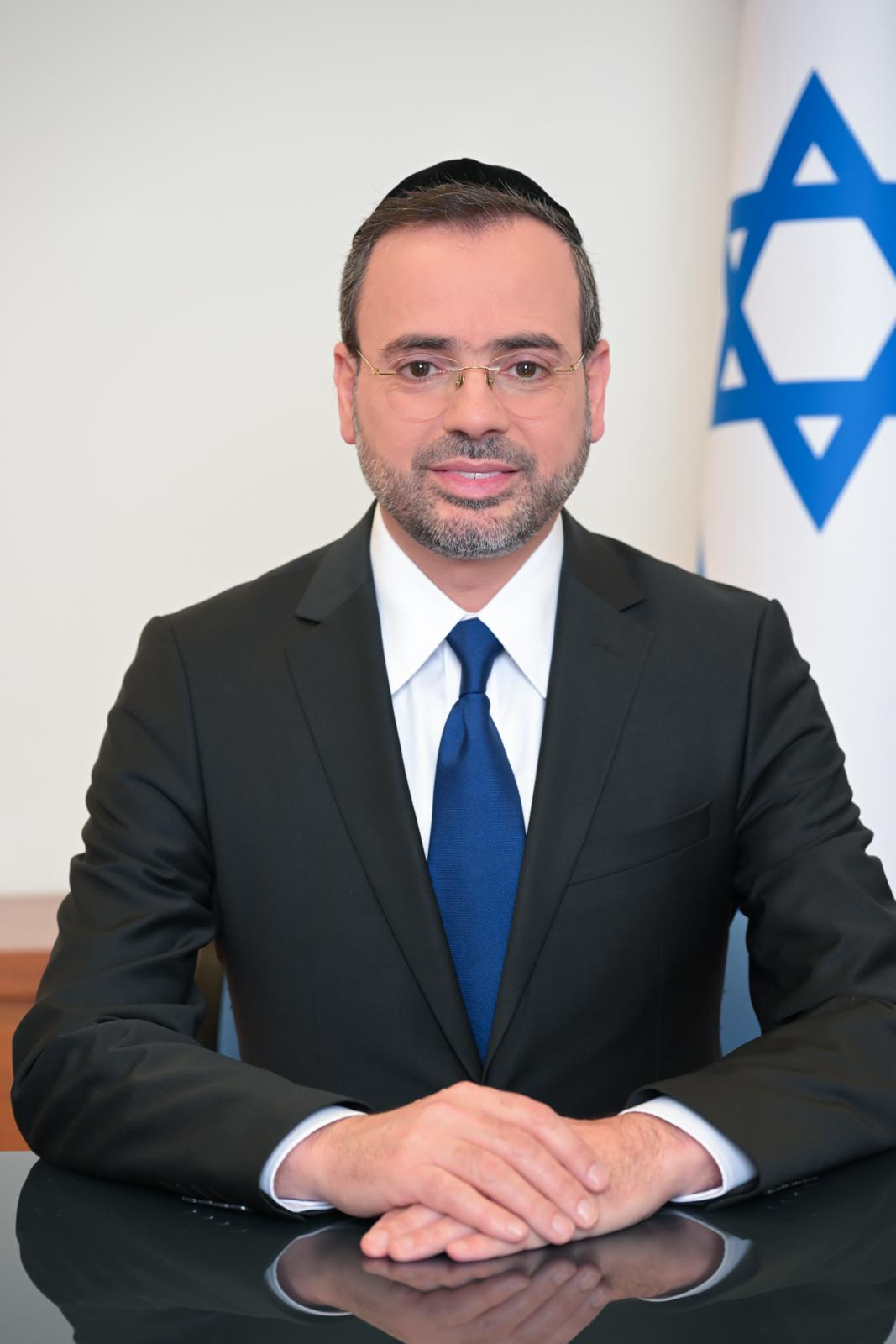
- Buso in 2023

Ministerial roles
- 2023–2025: Minister of Health

Faction represented in the Knesset
- 2020–: Shas

Personal details
- Born: 13 September 1973 (age 53) Ramla, Israel
- Party: Shas
- Children: 6
- Relatives: Aharon Abuhatzira (uncle); Yehuda Avidan (cousin)
- Education: Ono Academic College

Uriel Menachem Buso (Hebrew: אוריאל מנחם בוסו; born 13 September 1973) is an Israeli politician who serves as a member of the Knesset for Shas and who served as Minister of Health.

== Biography ==
Buso was born the ninth of ten children in Ramla. His mother Heftziba is the daughter of the Moroccan-born Mayor and Chief Rabbi of Ramla, Yitzhak Abihatsira, commonly referred to as "the Baba Khaki", and his father Nisim is an immigrant from Argentina who studied at Porat Yosef Yeshivah.

He lives in Petah Tikva, and is married, with six children. In 2019, his eldest son was married in a ceremony attended by Yitzhak Yosef, Shlomo Amar, Aryeh Deri, and Yuli Edelstein. He earned a Bachelor's Degree in law, at Ono Academic College.

=== Legal issues ===
On 8 February 2011 Buso was arrested alongside the mayor of Petah Tikva, Itzik Ohayun, on suspicion of corruption, namely taking bribes and undisclosed finances. In March 2011, the Israeli authorities stated that they had enough to prosecute them. However, in 2013, the State Attorney office dropped the charges, saying that there was not enough evidence for wrongdoing.

=== Assassination attempt ===
Buso survived an apparent assassination attempt in 2014, when a bomb exploded under his car. No one was injured in the attack, as the vehicle was unoccupied at the time, but Buso said he was shaken by the attack, and that he had not previously received any threats.

=== Political career ===
Buso entered the Knesset after failing to be elected in the 2019 or 2020 elections, but succeeded the resigning Aryeh Deri due to the Norwegian Law. On 12 October 2023, he was appointed Minister of Health as part of a cabinet reshuffle caused by the Gaza war. He exited the government in July 2025, alongside other Shas cabinet members.

Buso ran for Mayor of Bnei Brak in the 2024 municipal elections, against United Torah Judaism candidate Hanoch Zeibert. He received 36.6% of the vote, losing to Zeibert.

He was appointed the head of the Knesset Health Committee and resigned when he became the Minister of Health.

In July 2025, he resigned from his position as Minister of Health due to the "Draft Law" crisis.

Buso was elected to the Knesset in the 2026 Israeli legislative election following various resignations on the Shas list.
