= Viri Galilaei Church =

Coordinates: 31.7823°N 35.2449°E

- ἄνδρες Γαλιλαῖοι
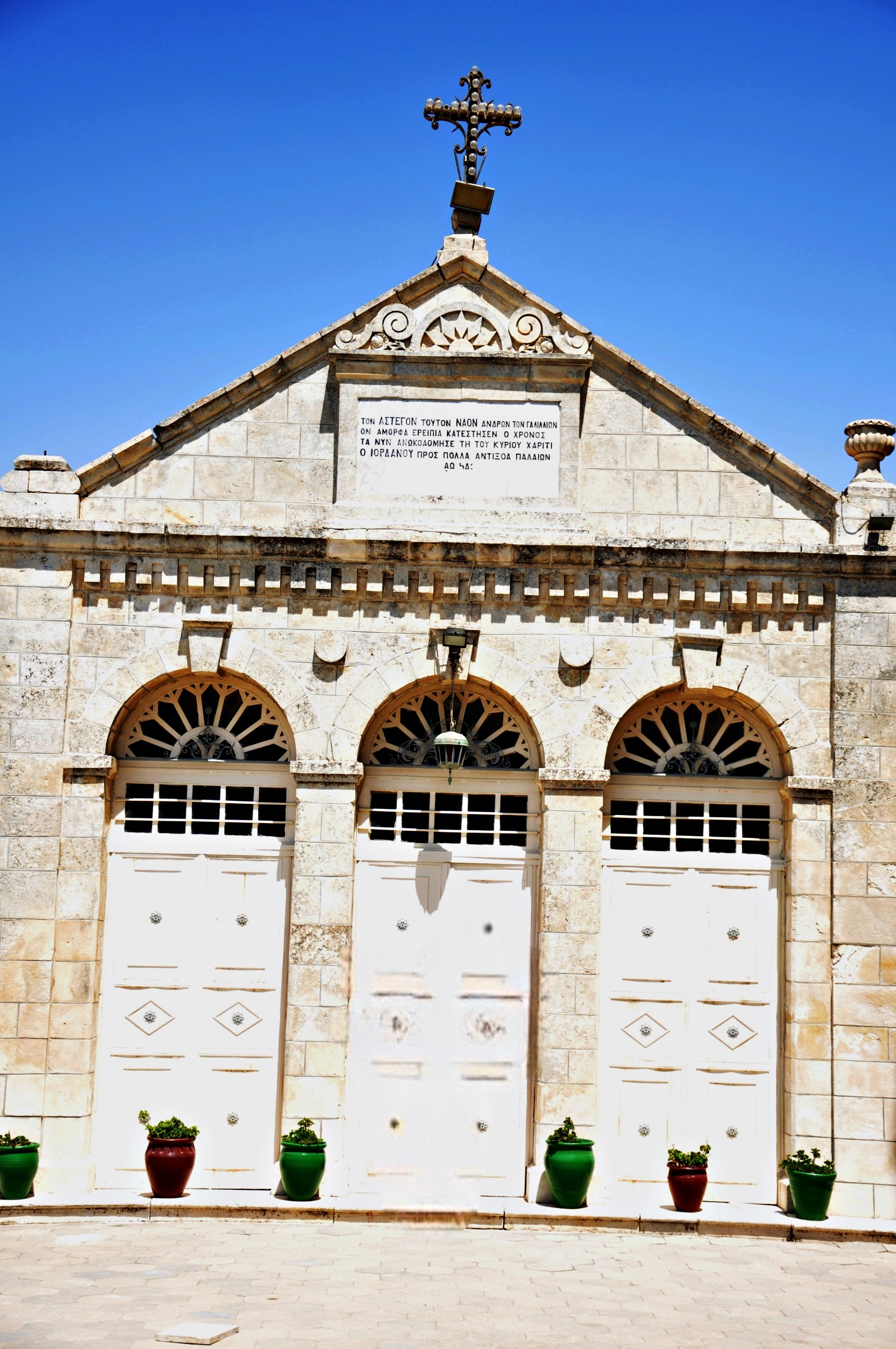
- Viri Galilaei Church
- Location: Jerusalem
- Country: Israel
- Denomination: Greek Orthodox Church

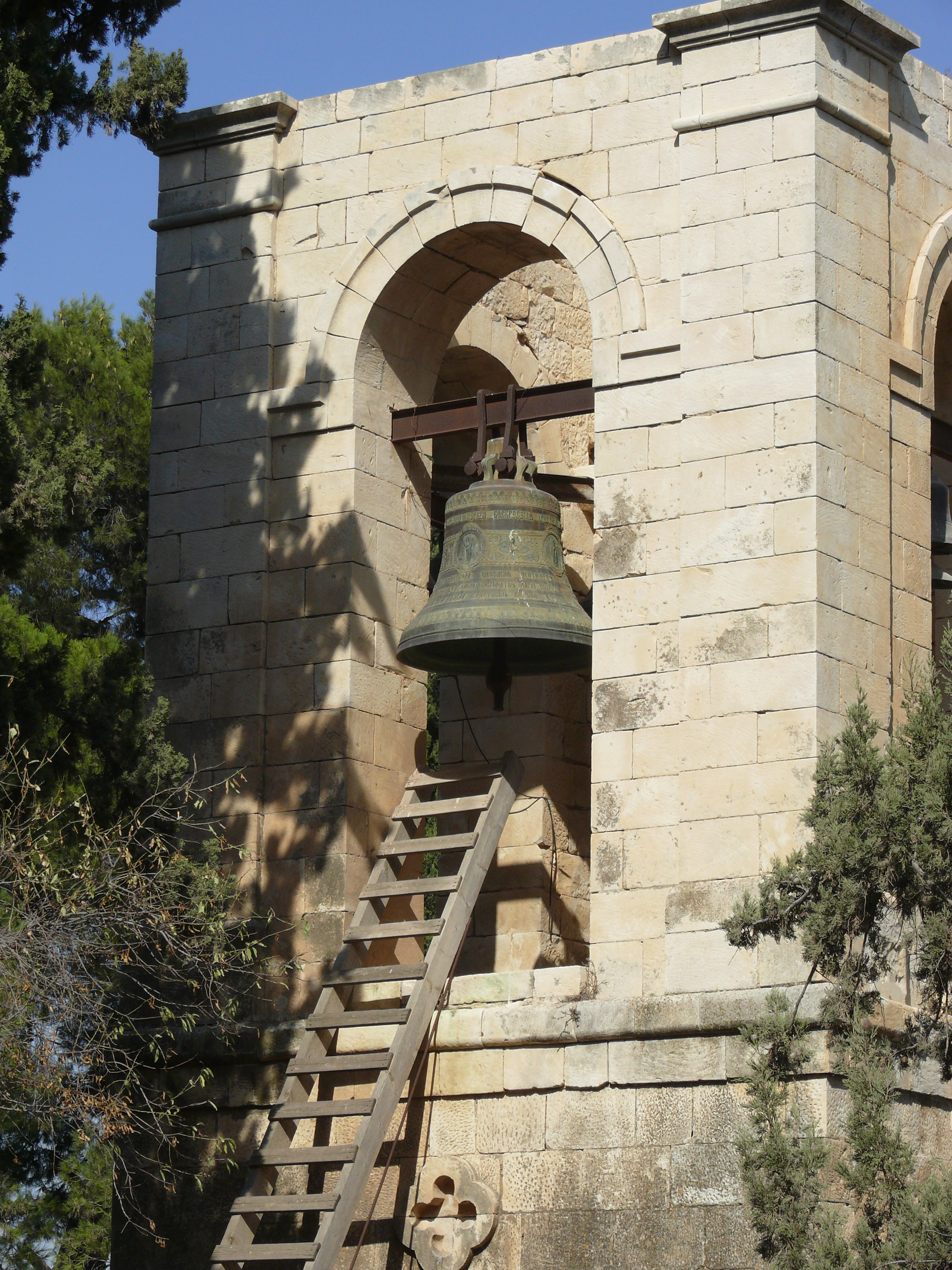
Bell Tower

The Viri Galilaei Church (Greek: ἄνδρες Γαλιλαῖοι) is a Greek Orthodox church located at the northern peak of the Mount of Olives in eastern Jerusalem, Israel. It is part of the Monastery of Little Galilee on the Mount of Olives, which belongs to the Greek Orthodox Patriarchate of Jerusalem, and serves as the private residence of the Patriarch.

Its name is in Latin and means "Men of Galilee". It is taken from Acts 1:11, where two white-dressed men are addressing the apostles after the Ascension of Jesus: "Men of Galilee,....why do you stand here looking into the sky? This same Jesus, who has been taken from you into heaven, will come back in the same way you have seen him go into heaven." The association of this particular site with the biblical episode is based on a medieval tradition, labelled by Thomas Cook as "worthless".

It is in this place that the historic meeting between Pope Paul VI, head of the Catholic Church and the Patriarch of Constantinople Athenagoras, Ecumenical Patriarch of the Eastern Orthodox Church, was held in 1964, marking an important step in the ecumenical reconciliation attempt between the two denominations.

== Location ==
The church is at the northern summit of the Mount of Olives (810 meters), not far from the southern peak where the Russian Orthodox Church of the Ascension and the nearby Chapel of the Ascension are located, and a little southwest of the German Lutheran church of the same name, which is part of the Augusta Victoria compound.

== Description ==
There is a pillar on each side of the door, together bearing a Greek inscription which reproduces a Gospel verse relating to this place: "the eleven disciples return to Galilee" (Matthew 28:16; ΟΙ ΕΝΔΕΜΑΘΗΤΑΙ ΜΑΘΗΤΑΙ ΕΥΘΗΕΑΝΣΑΝ ΕΙΣ ΓΑΛΙΛΑΙΑΝ ΓΑΛΙΛΑΙΑΝ).

== See also ==
- Christianity in Israel
