= Ulpana Tzfira =

Coordinates: 32°0′15.2″N 34°51′16.7″E

Ulpana Tzfira is a religious institution for girls which is located in Tzafria, Israel. The ulpana is related to Bnei-Akiva's yeshiva and was established in 1965.
