= List of Arab members of the Knesset =

There have been Israeli Arab members of the Knesset ever since the first Knesset elections in 1949. The following is a list of the 114 past and present members. Some Israeli Druze dispute the label "Arab" and consider Druze to be a separate ethnic group. However, because they speak Arabic as their first language, they are still included in this list.

== Current members (19) ==
Knesset member	Portrait	Party(s)	Knesset(s)	Religion Affiliation	Notes
Mansour Abbas	Mansour Abbas	Ra'am	21, 22, 23, 24, 25, 26	Muslim	
Hamad Amar	Hamad Amar	Yisrael Beiteinu	18, 19, 20, 22, 23, 24, 25, 26	Druze	
Youssef Atauna	Youssef Atauna	Hadash; Joint List	20, 25, 26	Muslim	Bedouin
Bakhar Awawdeh	Bakr Awawdeh	Balad Joint List	26		
Ahmed Darawshe	Ahmad Darawshe	Ta'al Joint List	26		
Faten Ghattas	Faten Gattas	Hadash Joint List	26		
Haitham Zahalka	Haitham Zahalka	Ta'al Joint List	26		
Yasir Hujeirat	Yasir Hujeirat	Ra'am	25, 26	Muslim	
Waleed Alhwashla	Waleed Al-Hwashla	Ra'am	25, 26	Muslim	
Yousef Jabareen	Yousef Jabareen	Hadash Joint List	20, 21, 22, 23, 26	Muslim	
Iman Khatib-Yasin	Iman Khatib-Yasin	Ra'am	23, 24, 25, 26	Muslim	
Maha Karkabi	Maha Karkabi	Balad Joint List	26		
Abd El-Karim Masri		Ra'am	26		
Hassan Nassasra	Hassan Al-Nasasra	Balad Joint List	26		
Kamil Abu Rokon	Kamil Abu Rokon	Yashar	26	Druze	
Waleed Taha	Waleed Taha	Ra'am	22, 23, 24, 25, 26	Muslim	
Ahmad Tibi	Ahmad Tibi	Ta'al; Joint List	15, 16, 17, 18, 19, 20, 21, 22, 23, 24, 25, 26	Muslim	
Ibrahim Al-Turi		Ra'am	26		
Nihaya Washai	Nihaya Wishai	Hadash Joint List	26		

== Past members (95) ==
Knesset member	Portrait	Party(s)	Knesset(s)	Religious Affiliation	Notes
Ahmed A-Dahar	Ahmed A-Dahar	Progress and Development	4, 5	Muslim	
Afif Abed	Afif Abed	Likud	25	Druze	
Muhammad Abu Elhega		Yesh Atid	25	Muslim	
Afu Agbaria	Afu Agbaria	Hadash	18, 19		
Taleb Abu Arar	Taleb Abu Arar	Ra'am; Joint List	19, 20	Muslim	Bedouin
Mahmud A-Nashaf	Mahmud Al-Nashaf	Agriculture and Development	4	Muslim	
Hamad Abu Rabia	Hamad Abu Rabia	Arab List for Bedouins and Villagers; Alignment; United Arab List	8, 9	Muslim	
Labib Hussein Abu Rokan	Labib Hussein Abu Rokan	Cooperation and Brotherhood	4	Druze	
Jabar Asakla	Jabar Asakla	Joint List	22, 23	Druze	
Assad Assad	Assad Assad	Likud	13	Druze	
Shafik Assad	Shafik Assad	Dash; Democratic Movement; Ahva; Telem	9	Druze	
Zeidan Atashi	Zeidan Atashi	Shinui	9, 11	Druze	
Juma Azbarga	Juma Azbarga	Joint List	20	Muslim	Bedouin
Mohammad Barakeh	Mohammad Barakeh	Hadash	15, 16, 17, 18, 19	Muslim	Former Deputy Knesset speaker
Zouheir Bahloul	Issawi Freij	Zionist Union	20	Muslim	Sunni Muslim
Rostam Bastuni	Rostam Bastuni	Mapam	2	Muslim	
Azmi Bishara	Azmi Bishara	Balad	14, 15, 16, 17	Christian	
Ahmed Dabbah	Ahmed Dabbah	Kadima	18	Muslim	
Abdulwahab Darawshe	Abdulwahab Darawshe	Alignment; Arab Democratic Party	11, 12, 13, 14	Muslim	
Abdulmalik Dehamshe	Abdulmalik Dehamshe	Ra'am	14, 15, 16	Muslim	Deputy Knesset speaker
Yussef Diab	Yussef Diab	Cooperation and Brotherhood	4	Muslim	
Seif el-Din el-Zoubi	Seif el-Din el-Zoubi	Democratic List of Nazareth; Democratic List for Israeli Arabs; Progress and Development; Cooperation and Development; Alignment; United Arab List	1, 2, 3, 6, 7, 8, 9,	Muslim	
Hussein Faris	Hussein Faris	Mapam	12	Muslim	
Issawi Frej	Issawi Freij	Meretz	19, 20, 21, 24	Muslim	Sunni Muslim
Basel Ghattas	Basel Ghattas	Balad; Joint List	19, 20	Christian	
Mazen Ghanaim	Mazen Ghanaim	Ra'am	24	Muslim	
Masud Ghnaim	Mas'oud Ghnaim	Ra'am; Joint List	18, 19, 20	Muslim	
Emile Habibi	Emile Habibi	Maki; Rakah	2, 3, 5, 6, 7	Christian	
Haneh Hadad	Haneh Hadad	Labor Party	13	Christian	
Rafik Haj Yahia	Rafik Haj Yahia	One Nation; Labor Party	14	Muslim	
Walid Haj Yahia	Walid Haj Yahia	Left Camp of Israel; Meretz	9, 13, 14	Muslim	
Faras Hamdan	Faras Hamdan	Agriculture and Development	2, 3	Muslim	
Yussuf Hamis	Yussuf Hamis	Mapam	3, 4, 5	Christian	
Said al-Harumi	Said al-Harumi	Joint List; Ra'am	20, 22, 23, 24	Muslim	Bedouin
Akram Hasson	Akram Hasson	Kadima; Kulanu; New Hope	18, 20, 25	Druze	
Salah-Hassan Hanifes	Salah-Hassan Hanifes	Progress and Work	2, 3	Druze	
Nadia Hilou	Nadia Hilou	Labor Party	17	Christian	
Ibrahim Hijazi	Ibrahim Hijazi	Joint List	20	Muslim	
Halil-Salim Jabara	Halil-Salim Jabara	Ahdut HaAvoda	5	Muslim	
Hussniya Jabara	Hussniya Jabara	Meretz	15	Muslim	First female Arab MK
Amin-Salim Jarjora	Amin-Salim Jarjora	Democratic List of Nazareth	1	Christian	
Muhamad Kanan	Muhamad Kanan	Ra'am; Arab National Party	15	Muslim	
Masaad Kassis	Masaad Kassis	Democratic List for Israeli Arabs	2, 3	Catholic	Melkite
Ayoob Kara	Ayoob Kara	Likud	15, 16, 18, 20	Druze	Former Deputy Knesset speaker
Hamad Khalaily	Hamad Khalaily	Alignment	10	Muslim	
Tawfik Khatib	Tawfik Khatib	Ra'am; Arab National Party	14, 15	Muslim	
Raleb Majadele	Raleb Majadele	Labour	16, 17, 18, 19	Muslim	First Muslim Arab Minister. Minister without Portfolio (2007), Minister of Science, Culture and Sport (2007–2009)
Hashem Mahameed	Hashem Mahameed	Hadash; Balad; Ra'am; National Unity – National Progressive Alliance	12, 13, 14, 15	Muslim	
Issam Makhoul	Issam Makhoul	Hadash	15, 16		
Ibtisam Mara'ana	Ibtisam Mara'ana	Labour	24	Muslim	
Mufid Mari	Mufid Mari	Blue and White	24	Druze	
Abdullah Abu Ma'aruf	Abdullah Abu Ma'aruf	Joint List	20	Druze	
Nawaf Massalha	Nawaf Massalha	Alignment; Labor Party; One Israel	12, 13, 14, 15	Muslim	Deputy Minister, Deputy Knesset speaker
Mohammed Miari	Mohammed Miari	Progressive List for Peace	11, 12	Muslim	
Jabr Moade	Jabr Moade	Democratic List for Israeli Arabs; Cooperation and Brotherhood; Cooperation and Development; Druze Party; Progress and Development; Alignment; United Arab List	2, 3, 5, 6, 7, 8, 9	Druze	Deputy Minister
Gadeer Mreeh	Gadeer Mreeh	Blue and White; Yesh Atid-Telem	21, 22, 23	Druze	
Fateen Mulla	Fateen Mulla	Likud	21, 23, 24	Druze	
Hanna Mwais	Hanna Mwais	Hadash	9	Christian	
Mohamed Naffa	Mohamed Naffa	Hadash	12	Druze	
Said Nafa	Said Nafa	Balad	17, 18	Druze	
Elias Nakhleh	Elias Nakhleh	Progress and Development; Cooperation and Development; Jewish-Arab Brotherhood; Cooperation and Brotherhood	4, 5, 6, 7	Christian	
Amal Nasser el-Din	Said Nafa	Likud	8, 9, 10, 11	Druze	
Diyab Obeid	Diyab Obeid	Cooperation and Brotherhood	5, 6, 7	Muslim	
Ayman Odeh	Ayman Odeh	Hadash	20, 21, 22, 23, 24, 25	Non-religious (raised Sunni Muslim)	
Niven Abu Rahmoun	Niven Abu Rahmoun	Joint List	20	Christian	
Saleh Saad	Saleh Saad	Zionist Union	20	Druze	
Osama Saadi	Osama Saadi	Joint List; Hadash-Ta'al; Joint List	20, 21, 22, 23, 24	Muslim	
Ahmad Sa'd	Ahmad Sa'd	Hadash	14		
Samir Bin Said		Ta'al	25	Muslim	
Ali Salalha		Meretz	24	Druze	
Taleb el-Sana	Taleb es-Sana	Arab Democratic Party; Ra'am	13, 14, 15, 16, 17, 18	Muslim	Bedouin
Sondos Saleh	Sondos Saleh	Joint List	23	Muslim	
Saleh Saleem	Saleh Saleem	Hadash	13, 14	Muslim	
Ibrahim Sarsur	Ibrahim Sarsur	Ra'am	17, 18, 19	Muslim	
Mtanes Shehadeh	Mtanes Shehadeh	Ra'am–Balad; Joint List	21, 22, 23	Christian	
Sami Abu Shehadeh	Sami Abu Shehadeh	Joint List	22, 23, 24	Muslim	
Shachiv Shnaan	Shachiv Shnaan	Labour; Independence	17, 18	Druze	
Saleh Suleiman	Saleh Suleiman	Progress and Work	3	Muslim	
Hana Sweid	Hana Sweid	Hadash	17, 18, 19	Christian	
Wasil Taha	Wasil Taha	Balad	16, 17	Muslim	
Salah Tarif	Salah Tarif	Alignment; Labor Party; One Israel	12, 13, 14, 15, 16	Druze	First Arab Minister (Minister without Portfolio), also Deputy Knesset speaker
Tawfik Toubi	Tawfik Toubi	Maki; Rakah; Hadash	1, 2, 3, 4, 5, 6, 7, 8, 9, 10, 11, 12		Second longest serving Knesset member (41 years, 5 months and 9 days) after Shimon Peres
Aida Touma-Suleiman	Aida Touma-Suleiman	Hadash	20, 21, 22, 23, 24, 25	Non-religious (raised Christian)	
Wael Younis	Wael Younis	Joint List	20	Muslim	
Majalli Wahabi	Majalli Wahabi	Likud; Kadima; Hatnuah	16, 17, 18	Druze	Former Deputy Knesset speaker, briefly acting President
Muhammed Wattad	Muhammed Wattad	Alignment; Mapam; Hadash	10, 11	Muslim	
Abd al-Hakim Hajj Yahya	Abd al-Hakim Hajj Yahya	Joint List; Ra'am–Balad	20, 21	Muslim	
Heba Yazbak	Heba Yazbak	Ra'am–Balad; Joint List	21, 22, 23	Muslim	
Jamal Zahalka	Jamal Zahalka	Balad; Joint List	16, 17, 18, 19, 20		
Abbas Zakour	Abbas Zakour	Ra'am	17	Muslim	
Tawfiq Ziad	Tawfiq Ziad	Rakah; Hadash	8, 9, 10, 11, 12, 13		
Haneen Zoabi	Haneen Zouabi	Balad; Joint List	18, 19, 20	Muslim	Sunni Muslim. First Arab woman elected to the Knesset on an Arab party's list.
Abd el-Aziz el-Zoubi	Abd el-Aziz el-Zoubi	Mapam; Alignment	6, 7, 8	Muslim	First Arab Deputy Minister
Ghaida Rinawie Zoabi	Ghaida Rinawie Zoabi	Meretz	24		

== See also ==
- List of Arab citizens of Israel
