= Hadash–Ta'al =

Electoral list in Israel

Hadash–Ta'al חד״ש־תע״ל حداش–جبهة
- Leader: Yousef Jabareen
- Deputy leader: Ahmad Tibi
- Founder: Mohammad Barakeh
- Founded: 2003 (first) 21 February 2019 (second) 15 September 2022 (third)
- Dissolved: 2006 (first) 20 June 2019 (second)
- Preceded by: Joint List (second and third)
- Merged into: Joint List (second)
- Ideology: Israeli Arab interests; Arab nationalism; Secularism; Socialism; Progressivism; Faction: Communism (Maki)
- Political position: Left-wing
- Member parties: Hadash; Ta'al
- Colours: Red; Yellow
- Knesset: 5 / 120

Election symbol
- ום و‌م

Hadash–Ta'al (Arabic: حداش–جبهة, Hebrew: חד״ש־תע״ל) is a joint electoral list in Israel, composed of two political parties, Hadash and Ta'al. The list was established for the first time in 2003 for the election to the 16th Knesset, and ran again in the elections of April 2019 and 2022.

== History ==
Hadash–Ta'al ran in the 2003 legislative election and won three seats. In the 2006 legislative election, Hadash ran independently in the 2006 legislative election, while Ta'al ran as part of the Ra'am-Ta'al list.

In the 20th Knesset, the parties were part of the Joint List. Ahead of the April 2019 legislative election, Ta'al split from the list, but finally Hadash and Ta'al united once more. At the head of the list was Hadash chairman Ayman Odeh, and Ta'al's chairman Ahmad Tibi was in second place. On March 6, 2019, the Central Elections Committee for the 21st Knesset decided to disqualify the list candidate Ofer Cassif, contrary to the position of the Attorney General. The Supreme Court overturned the disqualification.

Logo of the Hadash–Ta'al in 2019

In the April 2019 legislative election, Hadash–Ta'al won 193,442 votes, six seats in the Knesset. For the following election in September 2019, both parties returned to the Joint List. Ahead of the 2022 legislative election, the Joint List broke up again when Balad decided to submit a separate list from the other parties that were members of the Joint List, and therefore Hadash and Ta'al reached an agreement to run jointly, with Hadash chairman Ayman Odeh in first place, and Ta'al leader Ahmad Tibi in second.

The results of the election gave Hadash-Ta'al 5 seats in the 25th Knesset.

== Politics and ideology ==
The Hadash–Ta'al alliance consistes of Hadash, a non-Zionist party that promotes Arab-Jewish cooperation, and Ta’al, an Arab party with a moderate nationalist orientation. Both Hadash and Ta'al have expressed support for a two state solution based on the 1967 borders. In 2022, Hadash–Ta'al leader Ayman Odeh and Jewish Hadash MK Ofer Cassif refused to be pictured in front of the State of Israel's official seal and flags.

Odeh has been accused by Likud of expressing support for Palestinian violence. In 2022, Odeh refused to condemn Hezbollah as a terror group, instead denouncing Israeli occupation as the source of terrorism in the region. MK Simcha Rothman accused Odeh of describing Latifa Abu-Hamid, the mother of several convicted terrorists, as a "heroine" and "the mother of heroes" in 2022.

Members of the Hadash–Ta'al alliance have faced criticism from Israeli MKs for statements made during the Gaza war. In November 2024, the Knesset Ethics Committee voted unanimously to suspend Hadash MK Ofer Cassif from the Knesset for six months due to comments he made during the war. Cassif had signed a petition calling to indict the State of Israel at the International Court of Justice in The Hague, was alleged to have previously in a tweet called Palestinians fighting the IDF in Jenin "freedom fighters", and publicly accused Israeli politicians of advocating for crimes against humanity against Palestinians. Some Knesset members also demanded that Odeh be expelled for saying he was happy about the release of Palestinian prisoners as well as Israeli hostages minutes after three hostages were returned home as part of the January 2025 hostage-prisoner exchange deal. (He said “Happy about the release of the hostages and prisoners. From here we must free both peoples from the yoke of occupation. We were all born free.”)

Some members did not condemn the 2022 Russian invasion of Ukraine. Ta'al's MKs watched a televised version of a speech via Zoom by Ukrainian President Volodymyr Zelenskyy at the Knesset rather than joining the Zoom call, and Hadash and Balad did not attend. Hadash's Ofer Cassif said: “Very sad that good leftists are being deceived after false propaganda — and that they even expect my friends and me to toe the line with the lies being fed to us. I do not take sides in unnecessary wars that harm innocent civilians, strengthen those in power, and enrich the lords of war.”

== Election results ==
Election	Votes	%	Seats	+/–	Government
2003	93,819	3	3 / 120		Opposition
Apr 2019	193,442	4.5	6 / 120	▲3	Opposition
2022	178,735	3.8	5 / 120	▼1	Opposition
