= Heba Yazbak =

Israeli politician

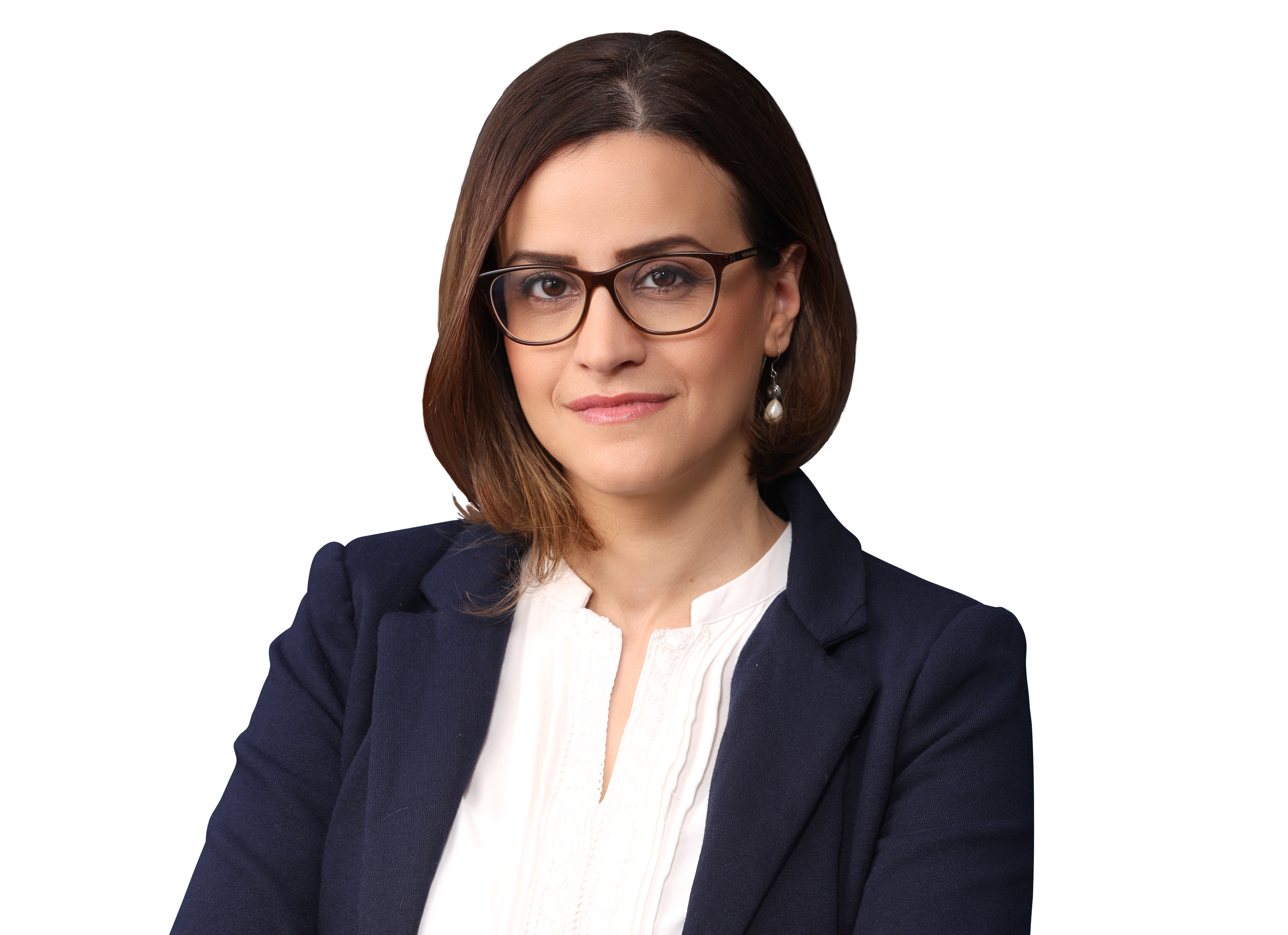
- Yazbak in 2020

Faction represented in the Knesset
- 2019: Balad
- 2019–2021: Joint List

Personal details
- Born: 8 July 1985 (age 40) Nazareth, Israel

Heba Yazbak (Arabic: هبة يزبك, Hebrew: הֵיבַּא יָזְבָּק; born 8 July 1985) is an Israeli Arab politician, sociologist and academic. She served as a member of the Knesset for Balad and the Joint List from 2019 to 2021.

== Biography ==
Yazbak was born in Nazareth into a Muslim family; her father Mahmoud is a historian at the University of Haifa focusing on Middle Eastern history. She attended the Salvatorian Sisters Catholic High School and earned a BA in social work at the University of Haifa. Her cousin, Wissam Hamdan Yazbak, was killed while taking part in the October 2000 riots in Nazareth. She studied for a MA in social work and was a PhD student at Tel Aviv University, where she also worked as a researcher and lecturer on sociology, focussing on Palestinian society and gender issues.

Yazbak became involved with Balad at the age of 15, and joined the party whilst at university, becoming chair of the University of Haifa branch. She was placed sixth on the party's list for the 2013 Knesset elections, but the party won only three seats. Prior to the April 2019 Knesset elections, she was placed second on the Balad list. With Balad running a joint list with the United Arab List, she was placed fourth on the alliance's list, and was elected to the Knesset as it won four seats. In the build-up to the September 2019 elections, Balad rejoined the Joint List alliance, with Yazbak placed eighth on the alliance's list. She was re-elected when it won 13 seats.

Prior to the March 2020 elections, several parties requested that Yazbak be banned from contesting the elections under the electoral law banning candidates who had openly supported armed conflict against Israel, as she had referred to Lebanese militant Samir Kuntar as a martyr in a post on Facebook. However, the High Court allowed her to run, and she was re-elected. Placed seventh on the list of the Joint List for the March 2021 elections, she lost her seat as the alliance was reduced to six seats.
