= Masud Ghnaim =

Israeli-Arab politician

- مسعود غنايم
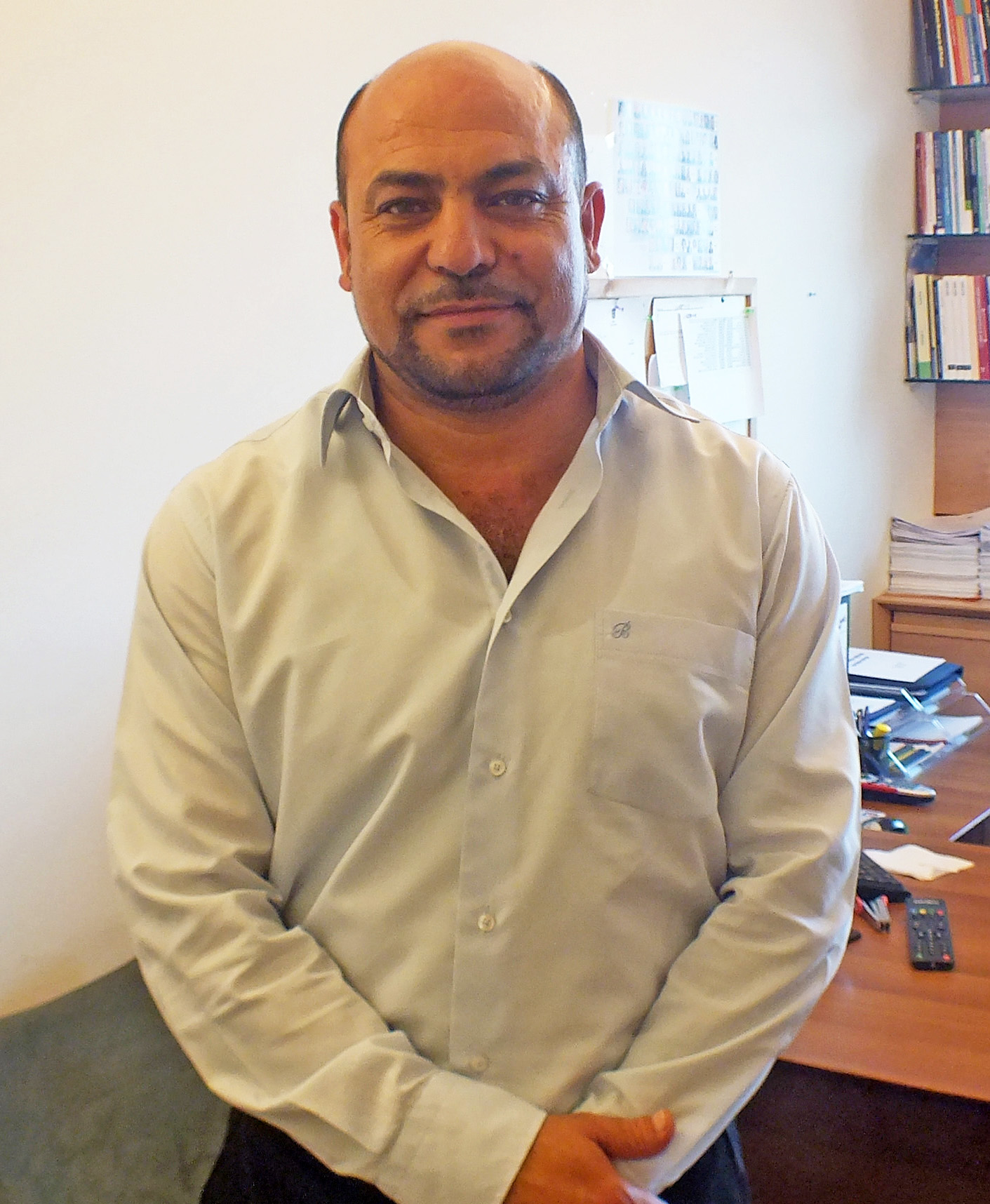

Faction represented in the Knesset
- 2009–2015: United Arab List
- 2015–2019: Joint List

Personal details
- Born: 14 February 1965 (age 61) Sakhnin, Israel

Masud Ghnaim (Arabic: مسعود غنايم, Hebrew: מסעוד גנאים; born 14 February 1965) is an Israeli Arab politician. He served as a member of the Knesset for the United Arab List between 2009 and 2019.

== Biography ==
Ghnaim was born in Sakhnin. He studied the history of the Middle East at the University of Haifa, gaining a BA, before working in education. Between 1999 and 2001, he served as director general of Sakhnin's cultural center.

He became a member of the Islamic Movement, eventually becoming the chairman of its local branch and a member of southern region's central council.

Between 2003 and 2005, he served on Sakhnin's city council, and prior to the 2009 elections was placed fourth on the joint United Arab List–Ta'al list. He entered the Knesset as the alliance won four seats. He was subsequently re-elected in 2013 and 2015, with the United Arab List becoming part of the Joint List from 2015 until 2019.

Ghnaim retired from national politics prior to the April 2019 elections, although he was given a symbolic 112th place on the joint United Arab List–Balad list for the elections.

== See also ==
- List of Arab members of the Knesset
