= Said al-Harumi =

Israeli politician (1972–2021)

- سعيد الخرومي
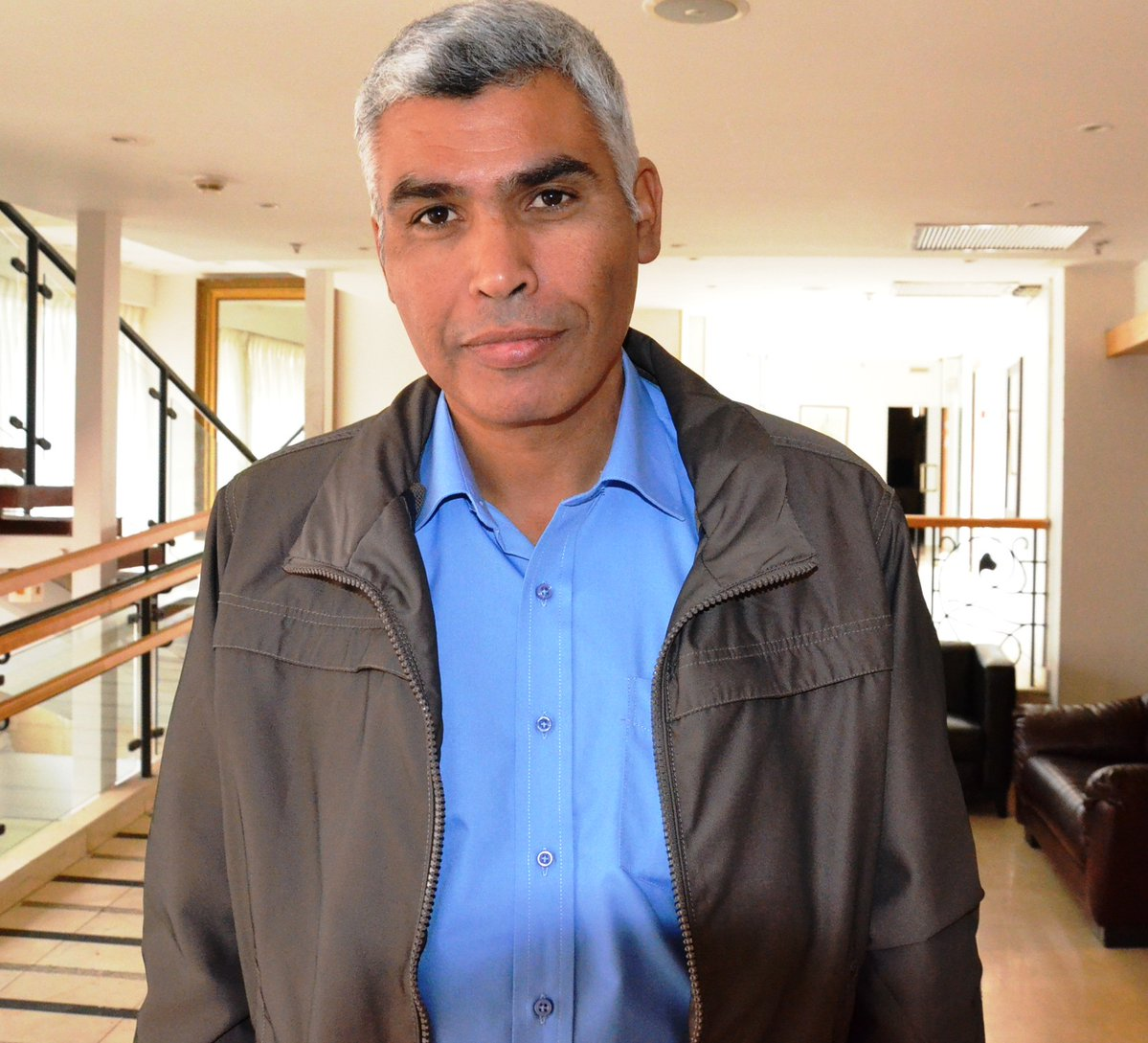
- Al-Harumi in 2017

Faction represented in the Knesset
- 2017–2019: Joint List
- 2019–2021: Joint List
- 2021: United Arab List

Personal details
- Born: 10 January 1972; Shaqib al-Salam, Israel
- Died: 25 August 2021 (aged 49); Beersheba, Israel

Said al-Harumi (Arabic: سعيد الخرومي, Hebrew: סַעִיד אלְחַרוּמִי; 10 January 1972 – 25 August 2021) was an Israeli Arab politician. He served as a member of the Knesset for the Joint List and the United Arab List in two spells between 2017 and 2021.

== Biography ==
Al-Harumi was born in Shaqib al-Salam in southern Israel to a Muslim Negev Bedouin family. After attending a local elementary school, he went to high school in Jatt in the north of the country. He gained a BA in physics from the Hebrew University of Jerusalem, and returned to Shaqib al-Salam to teach in the local high school.

He became involved in politics and was elected to the local council, serving as head of the council between 2004 and 2008. He was also Secretary General of the United Arab List, and chairman of the political bureau of the southern branch of the Islamic Movement from 2002 until 2014, before becoming the deputy chairman of the United Arab List. He was placed fifteenth on the Joint List list (an alliance of Hadash, Balad, the United Arab List, and Ta'al) for the 2015 elections. Although the alliance won only 13 seats, al-Harumi entered the Knesset on 11 August 2017 as a replacement for Abdullah Abu Ma'aruf under the terms of a rotation agreement between the parties.

Al-Harumi was placed seventh on the list of the United Arab List–Balad alliance for the April 2019 elections, but lost his seat as the parties won only four seats. However, when the Joint List was re-established for the September 2019 elections, he was returned to the Knesset as the eleventh-placed candidate on its list. He was re-elected in the 2020 elections for the Joint List, and in the 2021 elections for the United Arab List after the UAL left the Joint List alliance. Despite the United Arab List joining the coalition government, he abstained from the vote to accept the new government on 13 June, in protest of planned demolitions of Bedouin homes in the Negev. As a consequence, the government was only installed by a single vote, 60–59. Party leader Mansour Abbas said al-Harumi's abstention was symbolic and that he would have voted in the coalition's favor had his vote been decisive. The following month he was elected chair of the Knesset's Internal Affairs and Environment Committee.

In August 2021 al-Harumi died from a heart attack at the Soroka Medical Center in Beersheba at the age of 49.
