= Jabar Asakla =

Israeli Druze politician

- جابر عصاكلا
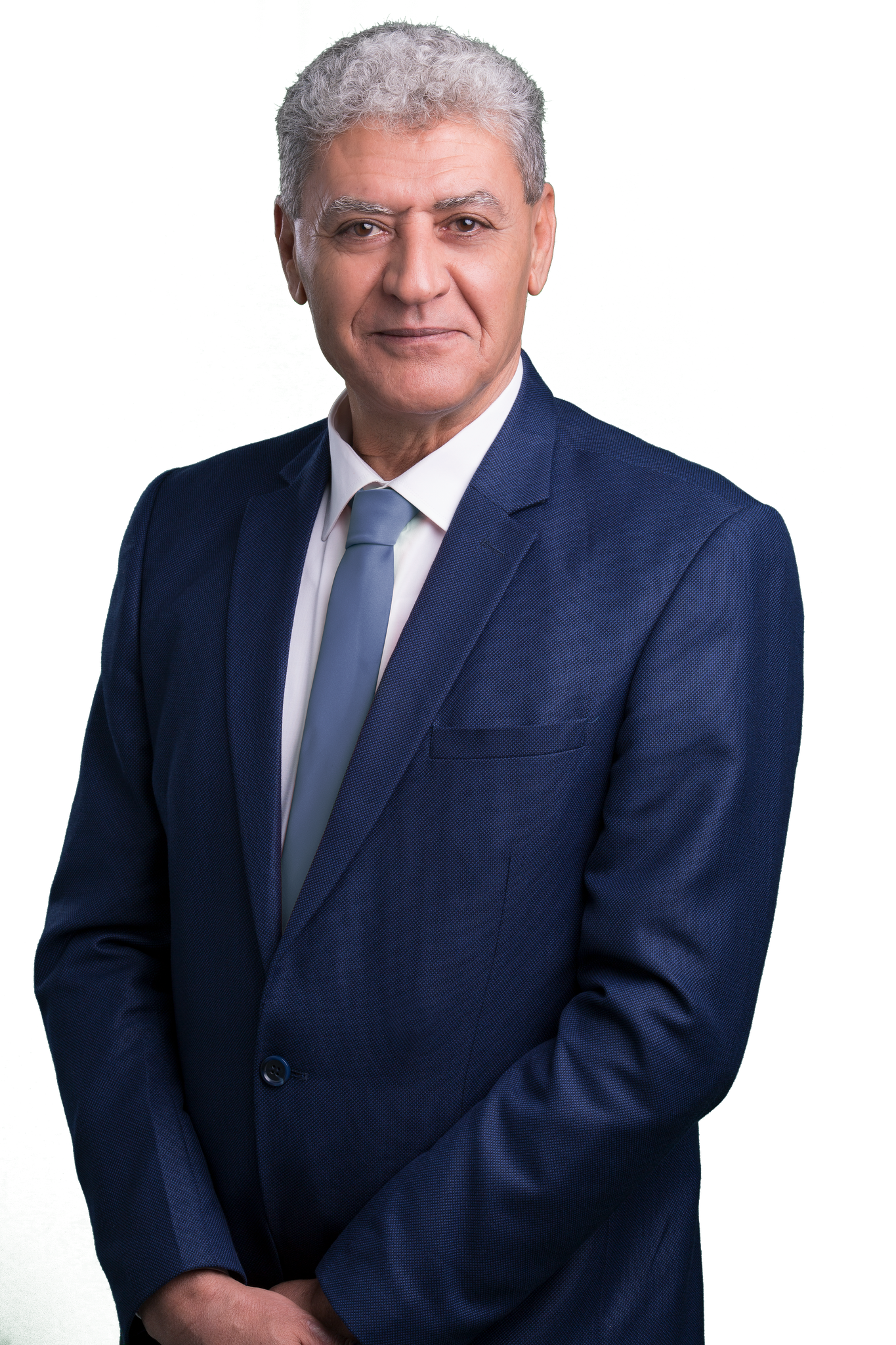

Faction represented in the Knesset
- 2019–2021: Joint List

Personal details
- Born: 20 August 1960 (age 66) Maghar, Israel
- Party: Hadash

Jabar Asakla (Arabic: جابر عصاكلا) is an Israeli Druze politician, organizational consultant and secretary of the Hadash Party from the local council of Maghar, Israel. He served as a member of the Knesset for the Joint List from 2019 to 2021.

== Biography ==
Asakla was born and raised in the village of Maghar in Galilee. After graduation, he refused to enlist in the Israel Defense Forces for ideological reasons, He received an undergraduate degree in educational counseling and Arabic language and literature at the Hebrew University of Jerusalem. During his studies, he served as Chairman of the Arab Students. He also got a master's degree in Educational Counseling at the University of Haifa. He served as vice-president of the Shatil Organization, and later served as the co-CEO of Sikkuy-Aufoq.

Prior to the April 2019 Knesset elections he was placed eighth on the Hadash–Ta'al list, but the alliance won only six seats. In the September 2019 elections he was placed twelfth on the list of the Joint List alliance, entering the Knesset as it won thirteen seats. He was re-elected in the 2020 elections, but lost his seat in the 2021 elections.

== Personal life ==
Asakla is married and father of three, and lives in Maghar.
