= Sondos Saleh =

Arab-Israeli politician

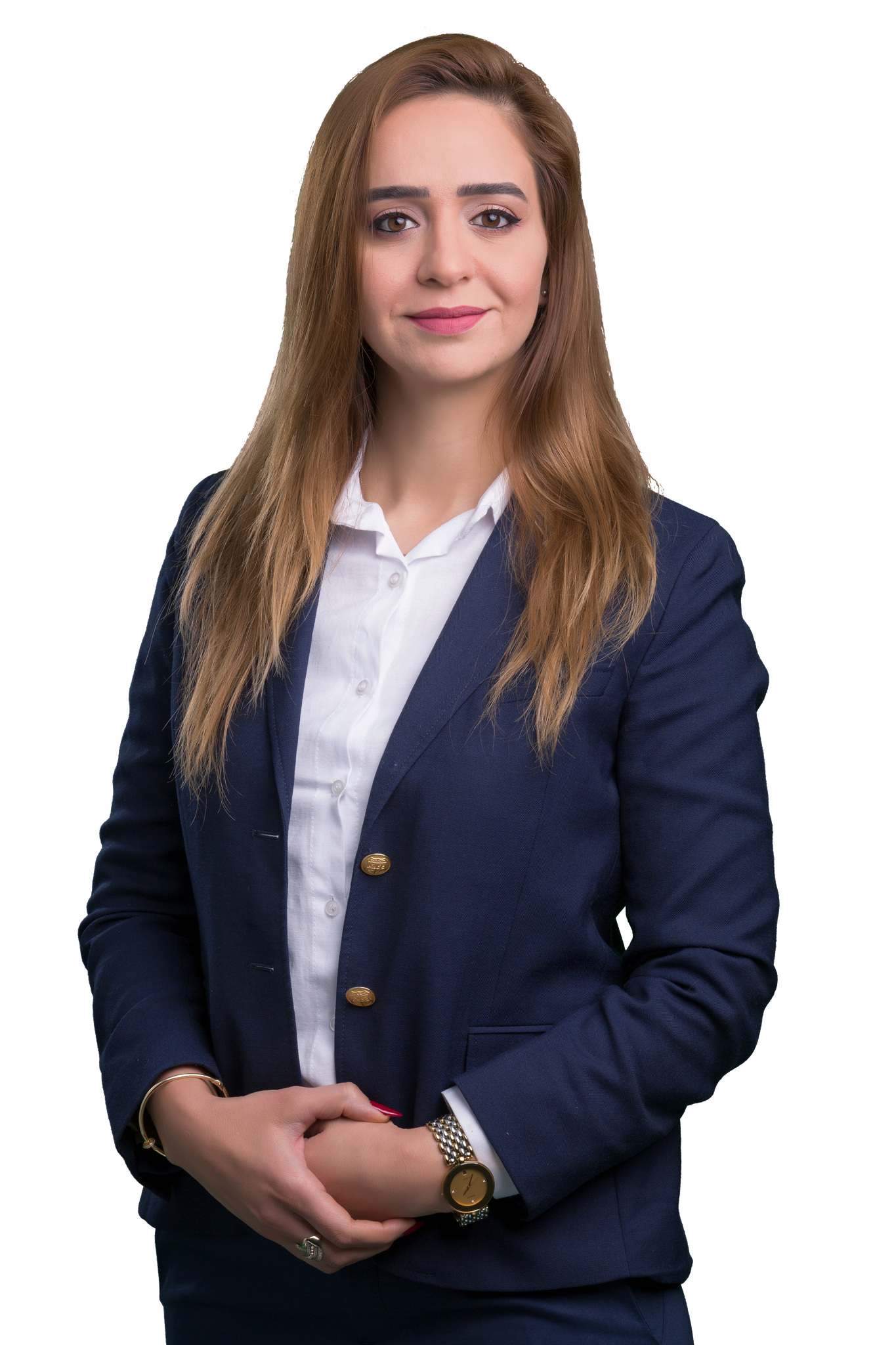
- Saleh in 2021

Faction represented in the Knesset
- 2020–2021: Joint List

Personal details
- Born: 17 June 1986 (age 39) Nazareth, Israel

Sondos Saleh (Arabic: سندس صالح, Hebrew: סונדוס סאלח; born 17 June 1986) is an Israeli Arab entrepreneur, teacher, activist and politician. A member of the Ta'al party, she was elected to the Knesset in 2020 as a member of the Joint List.

== Biography ==
Saleh was born in Nazareth and grew up in Mashhad, one of nine children. She worked as a teacher in Nazareth, and became chief executive of the Aleen Health Care startup and the Mujtamana Association, an arts and culture organisation. She has also written opinion columns for Haaretz, and studied technology education at the Technion.

She joined the Ta'al party and founded its women's committee. Ta'al was part of the Joint List alliance for the 2015 Knesset elections, with Saleh placed twenty-seventh on the alliance's list (which went on to win 13 seats). She was placed seventh on the Hadash–Ta'al list for the April 2019 elections, but the alliance won only six seats. Prior to the September 2019 elections, Ta'al joined the Joint List alliance, with Saleh given the fourteenth slot on the list. However, she again missed out by one seat, as the Joint List won 13 seats. She was given fourteenth place again for the March 2020 elections and was elected to the Knesset as the alliance won 15 seats. Placed tenth on the Joint List for the 2021 elections, she lost her seat as the alliance was reduced to six seats.

She is married and has three children.
