= Yousef Jabareen =

Israeli-Arab politician (born 1972)

- Jabareen in 2026

Faction represented in the Knesset
- 2015–2019: Joint List
- 2019: Hadash-Ta'al
- 2019–2021: Joint List
- 2026–: Joint List

Personal details
- Born: 23 February 1972 (age 54) Umm al-Fahm, Israel
- Party: Hadash
- Profession: Attorney, Professor

Yousef Taysir Jabareen (Arabic: يوسف تيسير جبارين, Hebrew: יוסף תיסיר ג'בארין; born 23 February 1972) is an Arab-Israeli academic and politician. He serves as a member of the Knesset for the Joint List since 2026 and was also as a member of the Knesset for Hadash and the Joint List between 2015 and 2021.

== Biography ==
Jabareen was born in Umm al-Fahm. He studied law at the Hebrew University of Jerusalem, gaining an LLB in 1995. He studied for an LLM at the Washington College of Law at the American University in Washington, DC, graduating in 1997, and earned a PhD at the Georgetown University Law Center in 2003. He lectured at the Washington College of Law between 2002 and 2003, and at the Centre for Jewish Studies at the University of Maryland in 2003, before becoming a member of the Faculty of Law at the University of Haifa and Tel Aviv University in 2004. He stopped teaching at Tel Aviv University in 2009, and became a faculty member at Tel-Hai Academic College. He also heads the Dirasat Arab Centre for Law and Policy in Nazareth, and was legal director at the northern branch of the Association for Civil Rights in Israel between 1997 and 2000.

A member of Hadash, prior to the 2015 elections he was placed tenth on the Joint List list, an alliance of Hadash, Balad, Ra'am and Ta'al. He was elected to the Knesset as the alliance won 13 seats. For the April 2019 elections, Hadash ran in alliance with Ta'al; Jabareen was placed sixth on the list, and was re-elected as the parties won six seats. The Joint List was reformed for the September 2019 elections, with Jabareen in tenth place. He remained an MK as the alliance won 13 seats. He was placed tenth on the Joint List's list again for the March 2020 elections and was re-elected. Prior to the 2021 elections he was placed eighth on the Joint List, but lost his seat as the alliance was reduced to six seats.

In 2018, Jabareen, while serving in the Knesset, was prevented from going on a lecture tour in the United States due to the tour being sponsored by Jewish Voice for Peace, an organization which was on a governmental blacklist in Israel due to its support for the BDS movement. He filed a petition that same year alongside Adalah, The Legal Center for Arab Minority Rights in Israel, but the Israeli supreme court upheld the ban in a decision in 2021.

In May 2026 Jabareen was chosen to lead Hadash's electoral list in that year's election. Following the reestablishment of the Joint List in August 2026, Jabareen was chosen to be the chairman of the Joint List.

Following the List securing 11 seats in the 2026 Israeli legislative election, Jabareen was sworn in as a Knesset Member for the 26th Knesset, leading the Joint list tripartite alliance in the parliament, representing Hadash.

In August 2026, Jabareen was promoted to the position of professor by the academic appointments committee of Tel-Hai University.
