= 2019 Israeli legislative election =

Since Israel held two legislative elections in 2019, the term 2019 Israeli legislative election may refer to:

- April 2019 Israeli legislative election
- September 2019 Israeli legislative election
