= Mahmoud Yazbak =

Israeli Arab academic (born 1956)

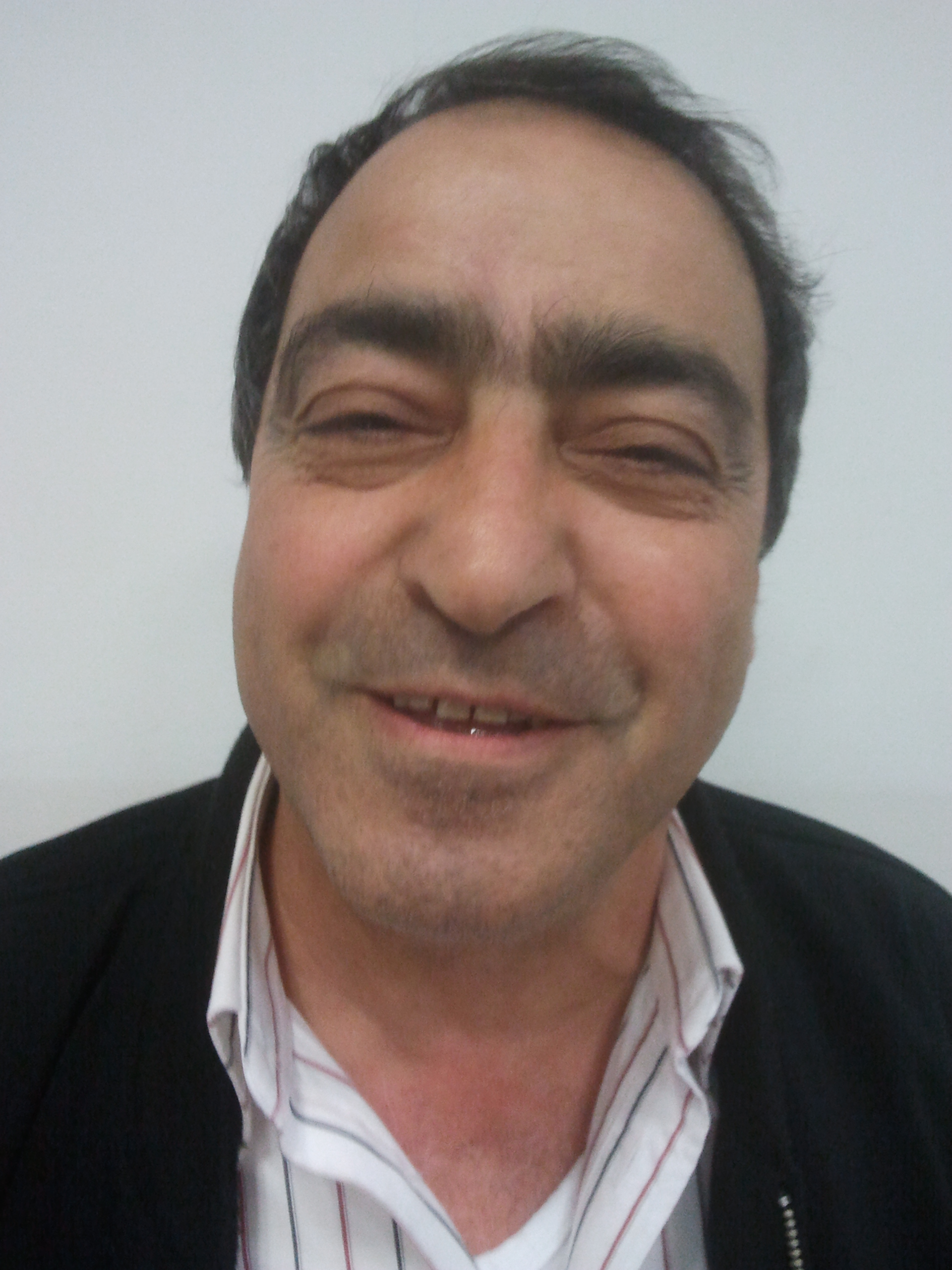
Mahmoud Yazbak

Mahmoud Yazbak (Arabic: محمود يزبك) is aa Palestinian academic. He is the first Arab elected as President of the Middle East & Islamic Studies Association of Israel, (MEISAI), the main scholarly association of researchers on the Middle East and Islam in Israel.

Yazbak earned his Ph.D. in Middle Eastern Studies from Hebrew University of Jerusalem in 1996. Yazbak is a lecturer at the University of Haifa. He specializes in Palestinian social history.

Yazbak is a board member of the Adalah since 2004.

He is the father of Heba Yazbak, member of the Knesset for Balad.

== Books ==
- Mahmoud Yazbak (1998). Haifa in the Late Ottoman Period, A Muslim Town in Transition, 1864–1914. Brill Academic Pub. ISBN 978-9004110519.
