= Waleed Taha =

Israeli politician

- Taha in 2026

Faction represented in the Knesset
- 2019–2021: Joint List
- 2021–: Ra'am

Personal details
- Born: 7 September 1968 (age 58) Kafr Qasim, Israel

Waleed Yusuf Taha (Arabic: وليد طه, Hebrew: וָולְיַד יוֹסֵף טָאהָא; born 7 September 1968) is an Israeli Arab politician. He is currently a member of the Knesset for Ra'am.

== Biography ==
Born in Kafr Qasim, Israel, Taha gained a bachelor's degree in political science from the Open University of Israel, a bachelor's degree in history at Tel Aviv University and a master's degree in political science at Tel Aviv University. He worked in education in Ramla as the principal of Al Huda School.

A member of the Islamic Movement, Taha became the chair of the organisation's Kafr Qasim branch. He was elected to the city council, becoming director of education. He ran in the Ra'am primary elections prior to the 2015 Knesset elections, attempting to gain second place on the party's list, but lost to Abd al-Hakim Hajj Yahya by one vote. However, he was placed sixth on the Joint List (an alliance of the four main Arab parties) for the September 2019 Knesset elections, and was elected to the Knesset as the alliance won thirteen seats.

The Ra'am list ran independently in the 2021 elections, with Taha re-elected as the party won four seats. In July 2020 Taha said that same-sex relationships were unnatural and that the “phenomenon of gays is almost nonexistent in Arab society." In September 2021 Taha was picked as the chairman of the Knesset Internal Affairs and Environment Committee. He was re-elected again in the 2022 elections as the second-placed candidate on the party's list.
