= Bakhar Awawdeh =

Faction represented in the Knesset
- 2026–: Joint List

Personal details
- Born: 11 June 1967 (age 59) Kafr Kanna, Israel

Bakhar Awadeh (born 11 June 1967) is a Palestinian-Israeli activist and politician who has served as a member of the Knesset for the Joint List since 2026.

== Biography ==
From 2009 to 2019, Awadeh was the CEO of the Galilee Association, a non-profit dedicated to improving public health, sanitation, environmental quality and agriculture among Residents of the Galilee. Awadeh previously served as CEO of the Center for Combatting Racism. Awadeh has also worked as the Director of the Ilut Department of Education, and head of the Kafr Kanna Popular Council.

On 27 June 2026, Awadeh was selected as the second member of Balad's electoral list in the 2026 Knesset election. Awadeh was given the fifth slot on the Joint List's Knesset list, later becoming its fourth-placed member following the disqualification of Balad leader Sami Abu Shehadeh. He was elected as the party won 11 seats.

== Personal life ==
Awadeh is a resident of Kafr Kanna.
