= Haitham Zahalka =

Palestinian-Israeli politician

Faction represented in the Knesset
- 2026–: Joint List

Haitham Zahalka is a Palestinian-Israeli politician who has served as a member of the Knesset for the Joint List since 2026.

== Biography ==
Zahalka, a lawyer, lives in Kafr Qara.

== Political career ==
Zahalka served as the deputy mayor of Kafr Qara twice.

He serves on Ta'al's Central Committee and was placed in the eleventh position on the Joint List's Knesset list ahead of the 2026 Israeli legislative election and was elected to the Knesset as the alliance won eleven seats.
