= Ahmad Tibi =

Palestinian-Israeli politician

- أحمد الطيبي אחמד טיבי

Faction represented in the Knesset
- 1999: Balad
- 1999–2015: Ta'al
- 2015–2019: Joint List
- 2019: Ta'al
- 2019–2022: Joint List
- 2022–2026: Hadash-Ta'al
- 2026-: Joint List

Other positions
- 2006–2019: Deputy Speaker of the Knesset
- 2019–2022: Deputy Speaker of the Knesset

Personal details
- Born: 19 December 1958 (age 67) Tayibe, Israel
- Education: Hebrew University of Jerusalem

Ahmad Tibi (Arabic: أحمد الطيبي [ˈ(ʔ)æħmæd (atˤ)ˈtˤiːbi]; Hebrew: אַחְמָד טִיבִּי [ˈ(ʔ)aχmed ˈtibi], sometimes spelled Ahmed Tibi; born 19 December 1958) is a Palestinian-Israeli politician. The leader of the Ta'al party, he has served as a member of the Knesset since 1999. Tibi was acknowledged as a figure in the Israeli-Palestinian arena after serving as a political advisor to former Palestinian president Yasser Arafat (1993–1999). He is also a gynecologist and a graduate of the Hebrew University of Jerusalem.

== Early life and career ==
Tibi was born in Tayibe, a town about 16 kilometres east of the Mediterranean coast north of Tel Aviv, in 1958. His father, Kamal Tibi, was born in Jaffa. Tibi studied medicine at the Hebrew University of Jerusalem, graduating with honors in 1983. He began his residency in gynecology at Hadassah Hospital in 1984.

But in 1987, he was involved in a violent incident with a security guard that led to his dismissal. Tibi had walked past a security checkpoint when the guard, a recent American immigrant named David Rothstein who had just been hired, ordered Tibi to let him inspect his briefcase after he had walked past the guard booth, assuming the guard would recognize him. Tibi refused, which led to a physical struggle between him and Rothstein for the briefcase. Moments later, Rothstein's superior arrived and broke it up. He identified Tibi as a doctor, and ordered him released. Tibi then swung the briefcase at Rothstein's head, causing a wound that bled profusely and required four stitches to close, and walked away, leaving Rothstein bleeding on the floor. Tibi claimed that Rothstein had tried to slap him across the mouth as they disengaged, which Rothstein denied. The hospital director, Jacques Michel, subsequently questioned Tibi, Rothstein, and a few witnesses over the incident, then fired Tibi without conducting a formal inquiry. A hospital spokeswoman said that Michel felt that to strike a man and leave him injured on the floor was such a grave and violent act for a doctor to commit as to warrant dismissal.

During his studies, Tibi had also become involved in politics. In the 1980s, he made connections with prominent Palestinian activists. He attended PLO meetings around the world, and in 1984, he met Yasser Arafat in Tunis, at a time when meeting PLO members was still a criminal offense in Israel. Tibi was questioned by police several times, subjected to a stay of exit order from Israel, and arrested once.

Tibi served as a political advisor to Palestinian Authority President Yasser Arafat from 1993 to 1999, representing the Palestinians at the 1998 Wye River negotiations. He resigned from this post in 1999 upon deciding to run for the Knesset. Tibi described his relationship with Arafat as "close" and "extremely interesting and important to [him]".

He was first elected to the Knesset in the 1999 elections after establishing Ta'al and running jointly with Azmi Bishara's Balad party, but broke away during the same Knesset session.

In 2002, MK Michael Kleiner initiated actions in the Knesset to restrict movements by Tibi inside the Gaza Strip and the West Bank. Kleiner claimed that Tibi was assisting the Palestinians in their war against Israel. Tibi protested the Knesset's decision as unconstitutional and illegal under Israeli law, and appealed to the Supreme Court of Israel, which deferred a decision on the case.

Ahead of Israel's 2003 elections, several politicians, including the heads of the National Union and National Religious Party, sought to have Tibi banned from standing again as candidate; the official motion to disqualify him was filed by Likud MK Michael Eitan, who argued that beside his history as adviser to Arafat, Tibi had supported Palestinian terror throughout the Intifadas and used his immunity as MK since his election to further Palestinian interests. Eitan's motion passed in the Israeli Central Elections Committee by one vote. However, the Supreme Court of Israel rejected the committee's arguments, unanimously overturning the ban, and Tibi was elected as part of a joint list of Ta'al and Hadash. Before the 2006 elections, Tibi took his Ta'al party out of the Hadash coalition and joined the United Arab List (UAL). After retaining his seat, he became a Deputy Speaker of the Knesset. He was re-elected on the joint UAL–Ta'al list in the 2009 and 2013 elections.

Inside and outside Israel, Tibi is acknowledged as an effective parliamentarian and advocate for Palestinians who live in Israel and the territories it controls. He was the first Arab member of the Knesset to succeed in passing legislation under his own name against opposition, including an August 2012 law regularizing compensation given by airlines to their customers for delayed or cancelled flights. In 2008, he initiated the establishment of the Parliamentary inquiry committee for the employment of Arabs in the public sector, serving as its chairman until 2012. He was favored several times in media surveys of the Arab-Palestinian population in Israel as the most popular Arab member of the Knesset and cited as best public speaker in the Knesset by parliamentary reporters. As of September 2014, Tibi remains Deputy Speaker and UAL-Ta'al Parliamentary Group Chairman. He is a member of the House Committee and the Finance Committee.

== Political positions ==
Tibi supports an Israeli withdrawal to the pre-1967 green lines and a two-state solution, with a Palestinian state established alongside Israel. He also opposes Israel's character as a Jewish state, claiming that its self-definition as Jewish is racist, and favors Israel becoming a "state of all its citizens". Accordingly, he supports removing icons that represent the special status of the Jewish majority, including the Law of Return, the flag, and the national anthem. He opposes the recruitment of Arab citizens of Israel into the IDF. Tibi also supports the Palestinian right of return, calling it a prerequisite for reconciliation, but has stated that he believes only a small percentage of Palestinian refugees would actually choose to move to Israel. Speaking to a 3 March 2018, London conference titled "Is President Trump legalizing the occupation?", the lawmaker denounced the recent Trump administration decision to move the U.S. Embassy to Jerusalem in May.

During the April 2019 Israeli elections, Tibi was frequently referenced by Benjamin Netanyahu, who used the slogan "It's either Bibi or Tibi" – a phrase which was criticized by Tibi and opponents of Netanyahu as playing on Jewish fears of Arab involvement in the Israeli political process to cast the election as a dichotomy between returning Netanyahu as prime minister or allowing Arab Israelis to join a government.

== Controversies ==
Tibi continues to be considered controversial in the Israeli politics mainly due to his wide relations with Palestinian and Arab parties, and his speeches in the Knesset. However, Tibi is also known for having pronounced a moving speech to commemorate Holocaust Day in 2010 at the Israeli Knesset. Yair Lapid reported on Israel's Channel 2: "Knesset elders claim that it might have been the best speech ever given in the Israeli Parliament."

Following an event honoring Palestinian martyrs (shahid in Arabic) in January 2012, Tibi appeared on a video describing martyrs as a "symbol of the homeland." The video showed him congratulating Palestinian martyrs in the Palestinian territories and inside Israel, as well as overseas, asserting that for Palestinians "there is nothing more praiseworthy than those who die for the homeland." When Tibi was asked for clarification of his use of the word martyr, he explained that he referred to those who were "killed by the occupation" or "died for a national cause" and that the video had been edited and did not present "the true meaning of his remarks." In March of the same year, the Ethics Committee of the Knesset reprimanded Tibi harshly for his remarks that "can be construed as being sympathetic towards acts of terror and violence."

== See also ==
- List of Arab members of the Knesset
