= Abd al-Hakim Hajj Yahya =

Arab-Israeli politician

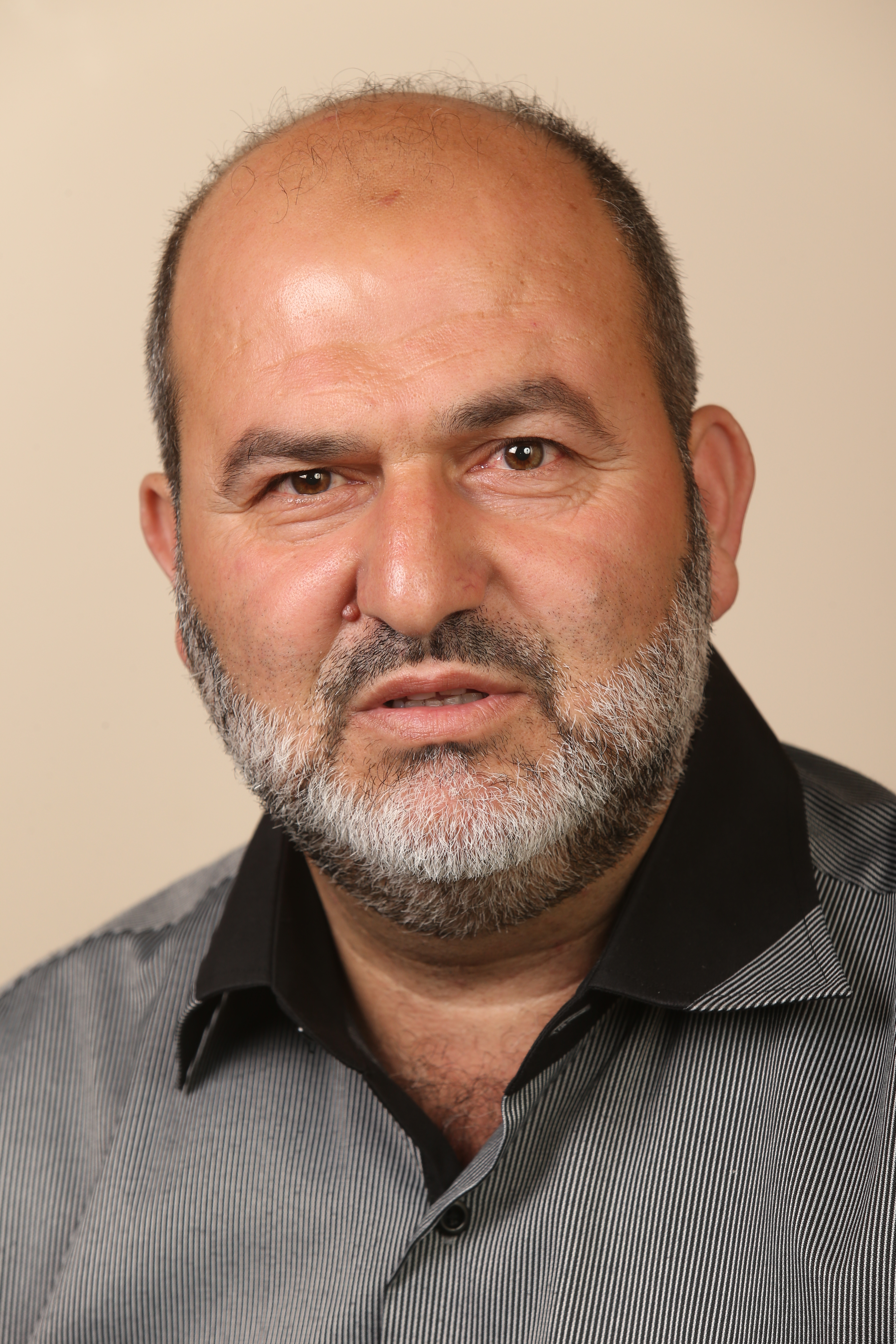
- Hajj Yahya in 2015

Faction represented in the Knesset
- 2015–2019: Joint List
- 2019: United Arab List

Personal details
- Born: 16 February 1965 (age 61) Tayibe, Israel

Abd al-Hakim Hajj Yahya (Arabic: عبد الحكيم حاج يحيى, Hebrew: עַבֵּד אַל־חַכִּים חַאג׳ יָחיָא; born 16 February 1965) is an Israeli Arab engineer and politician. He was a member of the Knesset for the United Arab List.

== Biography ==
Hajj Yayha was born in Tayibe, and studied civil engineering at the Technion – Israel Institute of Technology. He is married with four children and lives in Tayibe.

Hajj Yayha joined the Islamic Movement in 1981. He served as mayor of Tayibe for six months in 1998 and again from 2005 until 2007. In 2007 Interior Minister Roni Bar-On removed Hajj Yayha from office and replaced him with an appointed committee. Hajj Yayha filed a petition against the decision, but it was dismissed.

Prior to the 2015 Knesset elections he was elected to second place on the United Arab List (UAL), the political wing of the Southern Branch of the Islamic Movement. With the party becoming part of the Joint List, an alliance with Hadash, Balad and Ta'al, Hajj Yahya was placed sixth on the overall Joint List list. He was elected to the Knesset as the alliance won 13 seats. For the April 2019 elections, the UAL ran a joint list with Balad, with Hajj Yahya as the second UAL candidate and third on the joint list. He was re-elected to the Knesset as the alliance won four seats.
