= Yasir Hujeirat =

Arab Israeli geneticist and politician

- ياسر حجيرات

Faction represented in the Knesset
- 2022–: Ra'am

Personal details
- Born: 19 December 1965 (age 60) Bir al-Makhsur, Israel

Yasir Mahmoud Hujeirat (Arabic: ياسر حجيرات; Hebrew: יאסר חוג'יראת; born 19 December 1965) is an Arab Israeli geneticist and politician who was elected to the Knesset for Ra'am in the 2022 elections.

== Political career ==
He was placed in the fifth slot of the electoral list of Ra'am following primaries that were held in August 2022.

== See also ==
- List of members of the twenty-fifth Knesset
