= Joint List =

Israeli electoral alliance, established in 2015

Joint List הרשימה המשותפת القائمة المشتركة
- Leader: Yousef Jabareen
- Founded: 23 January 2015 20 June 2019 19 August 2026
- Dissolved: 21 February 2019 (first) 15 September 2022 (second)
- Headquarters: Nazareth
- Ideology: Progressivism; Anti-Zionism; Israeli Arab interests Secularism Factions: Balad and Ta'al: Arab nationalism; Pan-Arabism and Palestinian nationalism; Hadash: Left-wing nationalism; Socialism; Communism
- Political position: Left-wing
- Member parties: Balad; Hadash; Ta'al; Formerly: Mada (2021–2022); Ra'am (2015–2021)
- Colors
- Knesset: 11 / 120

Election symbol
- ודעם / و‌ض‌ع‌م (until 2026) ודם / و‌ض‌م (since 2026)

Website
- jointlist.org.il/en/

The Joint List (Arabic: القائمة المشتركة, romanized: al-Qaʾimah al-Mushtarakah; Hebrew: הָרְשִׁימָה הַמְּשֻׁתֶּפֶת, romanized: HaReshima HaMeshutefet) is a political alliance of Arab-majority political parties in Israel which was initially established in 2015. The current Joint List re-established in 2026 by Hadash, Balad and Ta'al adheres to a left-wing, progressive and Anti-Zionist platform. The alliance included the Islamist Ra'am party ahead of the 2015 election. The original Joint List was dissolved in 2019 and 2021 due to the withdrawal of Ta'al and Ra'am, respectively.

The alliance was the third-largest faction in the Knesset after the 2015 election, estimated to have received 82% of the Arab vote. In January 2019, Ta'al split from the alliance, and the remaining coalition was dissolved on 21 February 2019. The Joint List was re-established on 28 July for the September 2019 election, in which it won 13 seats and was again the third-largest faction. In the 2020 elections, the Joint List increased its seats from 13 to 15, described by Haaretz as "an unprecedented showing." In the buildup to the 2021 elections, the Islamic conservative-leaning Ra'am left the Joint List due to ideological disagreements and ran on its own, gaining four seats, while the seats held by the Joint List fell to six. The alliance broke up prior to the 2022 elections, with Hadash and Ta'al running together and Balad running alone.

Hadash, Ta'al and Balad reached an agreement, following extensive negotiations, on 19 August 2026 to run together in the 2026 Israeli legislative election, while Ra'am chose to run separately. The slate was headed by Hadash chairman Yousef Jabareen, followed by Ta'al chairman Ahmad Tibi and Balad chairman Sami Abu Shehadeh. After Shehadeh's withdrawal on 2 October, the third spot on the list was occupied by Hadash member Faten Ghattas, while the highest placing Balad member was Bakhar Awawdeh at fourth. The alliance won 11 seats.

== History ==
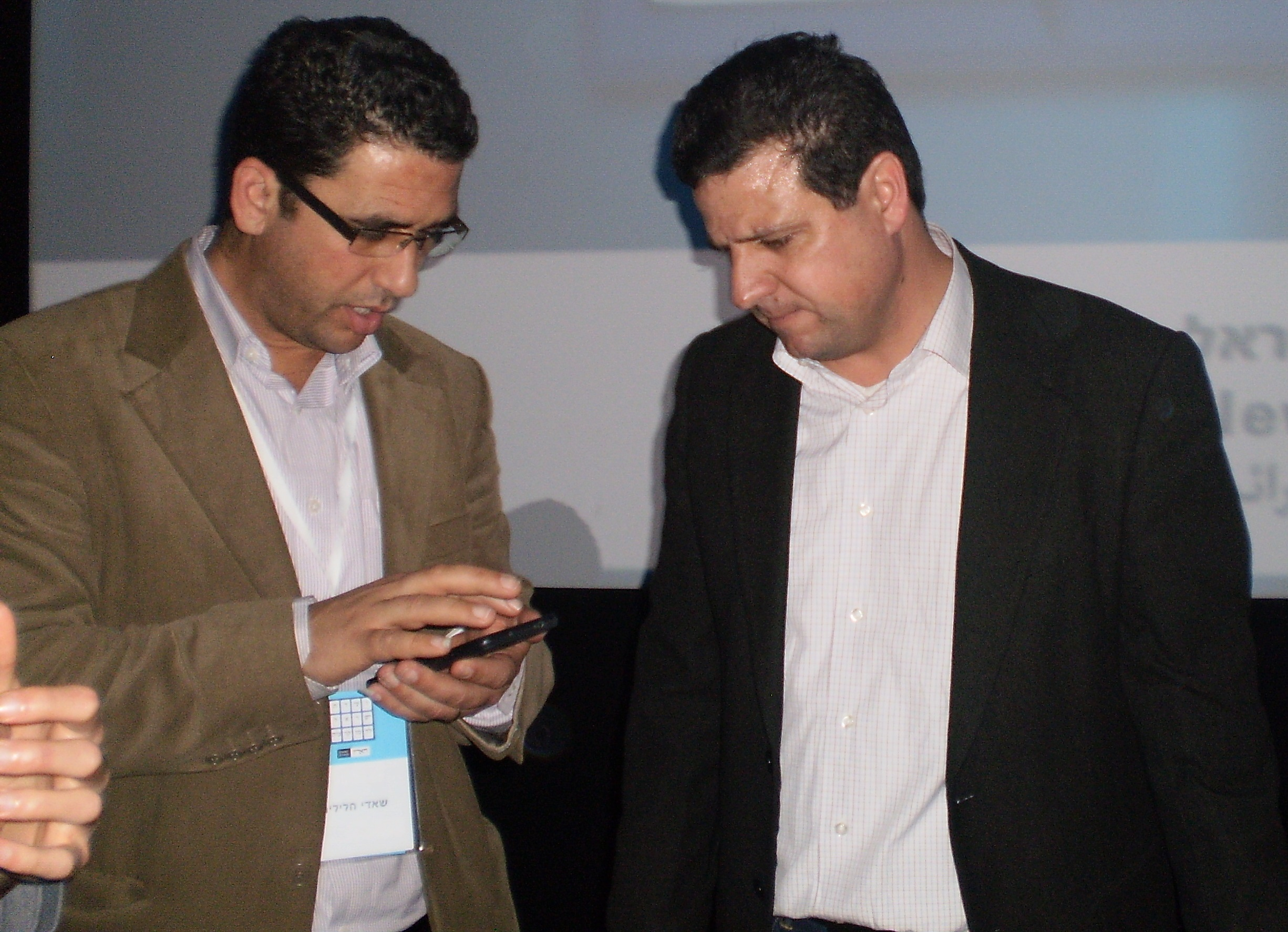
Ayman Odeh (right) and Shady Haliya

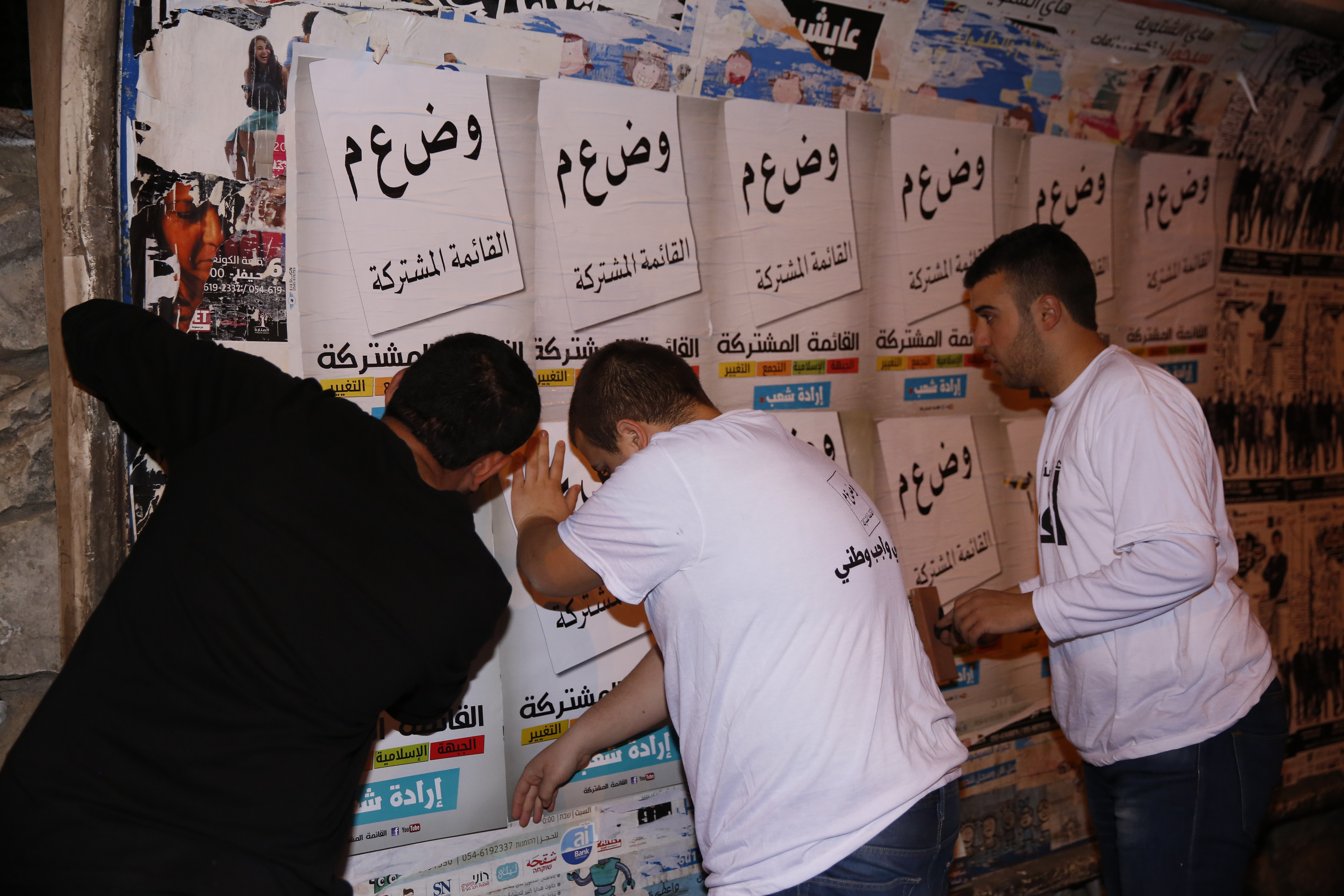
Activists of the Joint List during the 2015 elections

=== Initial formation in 2015 ===
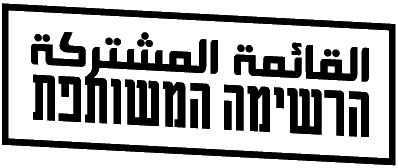
The party logos in 2015.

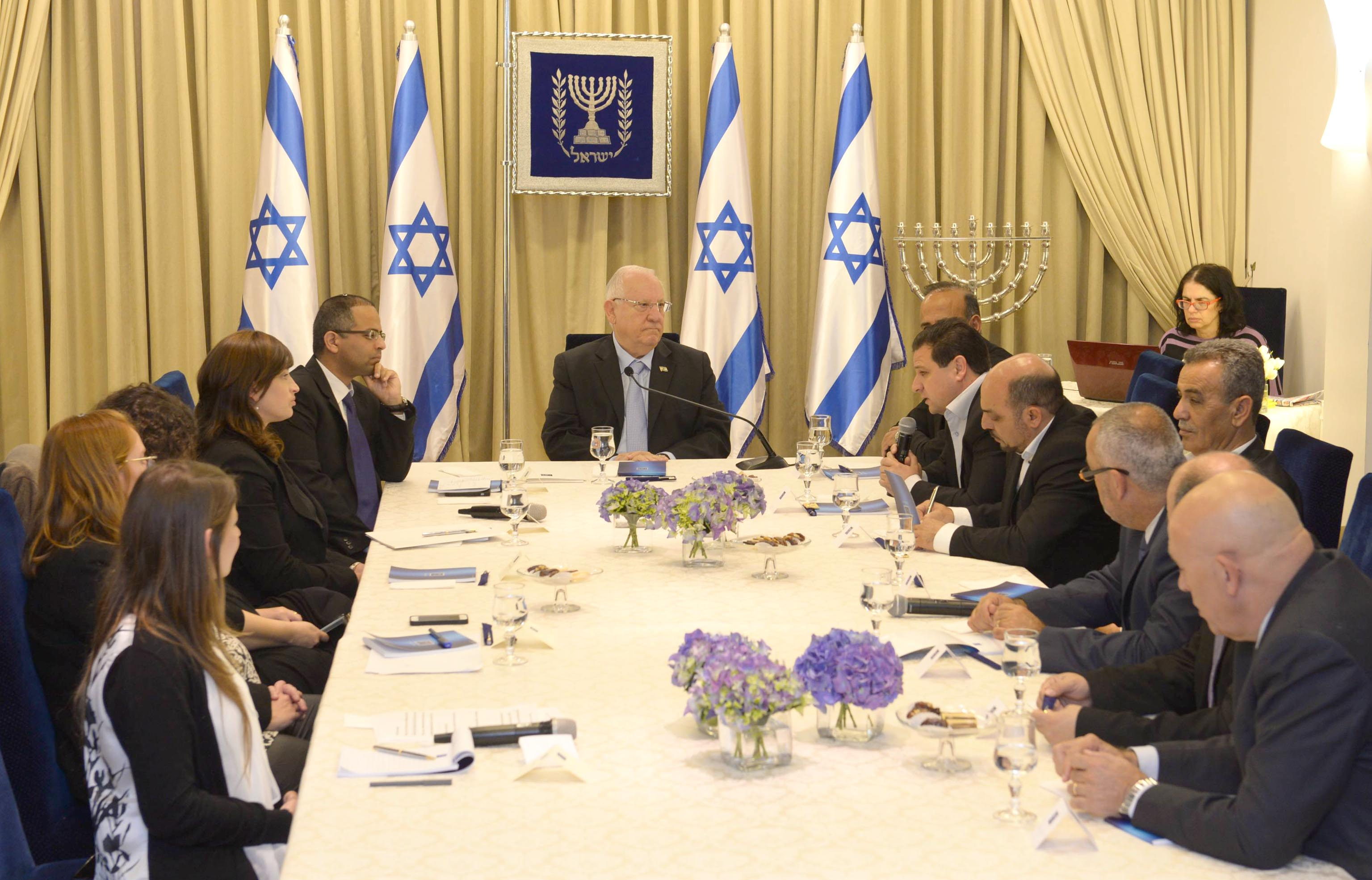
The Joint List during the consultation process at President Reuven Rivlin's official residence, after the 2015 elections

When formed ahead of the 2015 elections, the alliance was temporarily known as Wamab.

The agreement between the parties, which included Balad, Hadash, Ta'al, and Ra'am was signed on 22 January, marking the first time the major Arab parties had run as a single list. Balad, Hadash, and Ra'am had run separately for elections since the 1990s (Balad and Hadash ran together in 1996), whilst Ta'al had run in alliance with all three during the 1990s and 2000s.

However, the raising of the electoral threshold from 2% to 3.25% led to the parties creating an alliance to increase their chances of crossing the threshold, as both Hadash and Balad received less than 3% of the vote in the 2013 elections. Initially, the parties mulled running as two blocs (Hadash with Ta'al, and Balad with the Islamic Movement), but party representatives said pressure from the Arab public pushed them to join forces. The northern branch of the Islamic Movement denounced the entire electoral project.

A reconciliation committee was formed, which created the electoral list ahead of the election. The alliance's list for the 2015 elections was headed by Ayman Odeh, the newly-elected leader of Hadash, followed by Masud Ghnaim (Ra'am), Jamal Zahalka (Balad), and Ahmad Tibi (Ta'al), with the following places alternating between Hadash, the Islamic Movement, and Balad. The 12th to 14th places were subject to rotation agreements between the parties.

The Joint List won 13 seats in the 2015 Knesset elections with 10.6% of the total vote, becoming the third-largest party in the 20th Knesset. Odeh stated that he intended for the alliance to work on shared issues with center-left Jewish opposition parties and seek membership of key parliamentary committees.

One of the party's first actions after the elections was to trade the two seats that, as the third-largest faction, it was entitled to on the Foreign Affairs and Defense Committee for two more seats on the Finance Committee, primarily to better address its constituents' financial and housing concerns. Hadash's Dov Khenin was the only Jewish Knesset member representing the Joint List.

In late 2015, asked by Army Radio host Razi Barkai if the murder of Eitam and Na'ama Henkin in the West Bank is part of the "popular struggle," Odeh said that "the Palestinian people choose how to fight against the occupation. I have no doubt that the popular way is the right way and definitely not armed struggle." He said that he has rejected armed struggle in the past but said an occupied nation has a "right to struggle" for a Palestinian state based on the 1967 borders. Regarding throwing rocks, he said he supported the First Intifada, which was "fully justified" because of the occupation: "I cannot tell the nation how to struggle, where and which target to throw the rock. I do not put red lines on the Arab Palestinian nation," he continued. Odeh also argued he did not view waving the Palestinian flag as a provocation, saying it is the national flag of the Palestinian Arab nation and "does not threaten anyone. Every nation has a flag."

In December 2016, Hadash Secretary General Adal Amar came under criticism for praising the "unification of Aleppo" after Assad regime forces took control of the city. Some Hadash MKs voiced support for the Assad government. After the April 2017 Khan Shaykhun chemical attack carried out by Assad's forces in a rebel area of Syria, Odeh made a statement condemning the attack, but Hadah vetoed a stronger List statement naming Assad. In February 2019 ahead of the April 2019 election, the Joint List dissolved amidst disagreements over internal party representation within the alliance. The four member parties instead ran two separate lists, Hadash–Ta'al and Ra'am–Balad.

=== Re-formation in 2019 ===
Due to low Arab voter turnout in the April 2019 election, the member parties once again discussed potentially re-establishing the Joint List, which officially re-formed on 20 June. Members hoped to improve turnout and consolidate the Arab vote ahead of the September 2019 election, which they did, winning 13 seats and emerging as the third-largest party in the Knesset.

On 22 September after the election, the Joint List endorsed Benny Gantz for prime minister, the first time that an Arab party endorsed anyone for prime minister since Yitzhak Rabin in 1992. However, Israeli President Reuven Rivlin announced on 23 September that the Joint List's three Balad MKs had abstained from endorsing a candidate, thus putting Gantz behind incumbent Prime Minister Benjamin Netanyahu in total MK recommendations, though the Joint List's endorsement of Gantz did account for 10 of the political bloc's 13 MKs.

Joint List 2020 logo (Arabic)

The Joint List won 15 seats with 12.67% of the vote in the 2020 Knesset elections, remaining as the third-largest party in the Knesset until Yesh Atid split off from Blue and White to lead the opposition. This set a new record for percentage of the vote and number of seats for an Arab party, with it performing strongly in the Northern District, Arab cities and villages in the Galilee and also due to the high turnout in the Arab community. This was in part due to an increase in support from the Jewish left, as Ayman Odeh's campaigning in Jewish areas helped draw those voters away from the declining establishment left-wing parties. After the election, the Joint List unanimously supported Gantz. However, after the formation of a unity government, it remained in the opposition.

The Joint List ran in the 2021 Knesset election without Ra'am, which had withdrawn from it several months prior to the vote; it won 4.81% of votes and six seats, a sharp decline compared to previous elections. Such decline was mainly due to the fact that Ra'am ran separately from the List and to the partial resurgence of the Israeli Labor Party and Meretz, who increased their votes and seats.

Former alliance member Ra'am decided to engage with Netanyahu. Ta'al also left the alliance but later rejoined. During the election campaign and after party lists had been submitted, the Ma'an party withdrew its candidacy and endorsed the Joint List, becoming a new member of the alliance. Hadash's Ofer Cassif was the only Jewish MK representing the Joint List.

Members of the Joint List took varying stances on the 2022 Russian invasion of Ukraine. Ra’am’s Walid Taha attended a speech via Zoom by Ukrainian President Volodymyr Zelenskyy at the Knesset, Ra’am leader Mansour Abbas was speaking at a conference in Haifa at the same time as the speech, Ta'al's MKs watched the televised version rather than joining the Zoom call, and Hadash and Balad did not attend. Hadash's Ofer Cassif said: “Very sad that good leftists are being deceived after false propaganda — and that they even expect my friends and me to toe the line with the lies being fed to us. I do not take sides in unnecessary wars that harm innocent civilians, strengthen those in power, and enrich the lords of war.”

The alliance broke up when Balad submitted a separate candidate list for the 2022 election. Balad had objected to Hadash's position that the alliance should support a prime ministerial candidate following the election, and wanted to rework the rotational system of seat sharing employed by the alliance. The Balad list received 2.9% of the vote, failing to pass the electoral threshold. A Hadash–Ta'al list was formed, which received 3.75% of votes and won five seats.

=== Third formation in 2026 ===
In July 2025, amidst popular frustration over the Gaza war, Hadash revealed that it was in talks with Ra'am to revive the Joint List to increase the political influence of Palestinian citizens of Israel. According to a poll from Tel Aviv University, 73.3% of Arab respondents supported the inclusion of Arab parties into the next government coalition, while voter turnout among Arabs was expected to hit 57%.

In August 2025, the parties reportedly were negotiating a new Joint List. On 22 January 2026, the leaders of Hadash, Ta'al, Balad and Ra'am signed an agreement to work toward reviving the Joint List. Ra'am leader Mansour Abbas supported joining a technical alliance only if each party preserved its political independence after the election.

On 10 June 2026, Hadash announced that it was moving forward with re-establishing the Joint List with Ta'al and Balad, while leaving open the possibility of Ra'am joining later. According to Hadash secretary general Amjad Shbita, the other parties accommodated Ra'am's request for a "joint technical list", but Ra'am was unwilling for all parties to jointly endorse a political platform. Ra'am indicated in an interview the next month that it would run on its own in the election. Negotiations between the Joint List parties stalled in August after Ta'al chairman Ahmad Tibi rejected the proposed allocation of places on the slate. A Place for Us All tried to join the alliance but the negotiations failed and the party withdrew from the election.

Ra'am differs with other Arab parties on how to engage with Israel; it is willing to engage in electoral politics with Zionist anti-Netanyahu parties to gain "concrete" concessions while the other parties view working with a Zionist government as allowing themselves to become a "safety net" for it. This divergence makes it more difficult for the parties to reunite in one list.

On 19 August 2026, Hadash, Ta'al and Balad reached an agreement to run together in the upcoming election, re-establishing the Joint List without Ra'am. According to The Jerusalem Post, the agreement was signed after Tibi withdrew his opposition to a framework proposed by a reconciliation committee, though the deal remains subject to formal approval by the parties' institutions. The proposed list will place Jabareen first, Tibi second, Sami Abu Shehadeh third, Jafar Farah fourth, Bakhar Awawdeh fifth and Ofer Cassif sixth. Farah was replaced by Faten Ghattas following the submission of the list. Tibi is also expected to serve as chairman of the parliamentary faction. Jabareen suggested that same month that the Joint List could provide a "parliamentary safety net" to establish an "alternative" to the Netanyahu government.

Likud announced on 14 September that it planned to file a disqualification petition with the Central Elections Committee against the Joint List. The following week, Adalah filed a challenge in favor of the list. The Central Elections Committee barred the list on 23 September from contesting the election, with the final decision up to the Supreme Court of Israel. The court unanimously ruled on 2 October against the disqualification of the Joint List, allowing it to run in the election. Sami Abu Shehadeh submitted his withdrawal after the Supreme Court indicated they would likely disqualify him. The alliance won 11 seats in the election.

== Politics and ideology ==
The 2026 platform of the list is described as progressive and anti-Zionist. The first incarnation of the list in 2015 included socialists, communists, feminists, Islamists, and Arab nationalists; it included the Islamist party Ra'am, but the latter withdrew its membership in 2021. After having united parties with various political agendas in 2015, the leader of the party Hadash who initiated the list Ayman Odeh met with Jewish Hadash activists and former Knesset speaker Avraham Burg, who had endorsed Hadash, in an attempt to allay concerns that the new alliance would dilute the party's principles, such as gender equality. Parties within the Joint List oppose Israel as a Jewish state and advocate for it to become a state of all its citizens. For this reason, the alliance refuses to be part of Zionist-led governments. The Joint List is voted for primarily by Palestinian citizens of Israel; however, its voter base also includes anti-Zionist Jews. The alliance had launched campaigns in both Arabic and Hebrew to appeal to Jewish voters.

Currently, the Joint List positions itself as a movement of Jewish-Arab partnership and "real change" both for Arabs who may be disenchanted in Ra'am's strategy of compromising on its opposition and ignoring the Gaza war and the Gaza genocide to achieve cooperation with Zionist parties and attract Zionist voters, and for left-wing Jews who may be alienated by Zionist left forces like Yair Golan's The Democrats due to such their decisions as the support for wars and Israeli aims in Iran, Gaza, and Lebanon, or disqualification of Balad from elections. In appeals to the Jewish voters, the Joint list has called itself "the strongest guarantee of bringing down" Netanyahu and his far-right partners and proclaimed that achieving security can be only the result of Jewish-Arab cooperation. The Zionist left have been the historic competitor of the Joint List parties for left-wing Jewish votes.

The alliance's 2015 election campaign focused on preventing Benjamin Netanyahu from forming a government and helping the Labor Party–led Zionist Union do so instead. 2015 political programme of the Joint List was based on eight principles; promotion of peace and opposition to Israeli military occupation, equality for all, support for democracy and opposition to racism and fascism, workers rights and social justice, promotion of women's rights, development of Arab culture, language and identity, opposition to colonialism, opposition to nuclear weapons in the Middle East.

The Joint List was not united in terms of support for Jewish–Arab co-operation, supported mainly by Hadash. In March 2015 (after the Zionist Union had signed a vote-sharing agreement with Meretz, and Kulanu with Israel Beytenu), officials from the Zionist Union, Meretz, and Yesh Atid explored the idea that the Zionist Union and Meretz revoke their agreement so that the Zionist Union could share surplus votes with Yesh Atid, and Meretz with the Joint List, to potentially strengthen the dovish bloc in the Knesset. However, the offer caused intra-list tension; Hadash (including Dov Khenin and Joint List chief Odeh) and Ra'am supported the partnership with Meretz, but the Islamic Movement and especially Balad opposed it. According to Nahum Barnea, most of the List, including Jamal Zahalka of Balad, supported the agreement, but Qatar, which reportedly funds Balad, sided with the extremist elements within Balad and had the party come out against it. After the Joint List announced it would not share votes with any party, Meretz officials declared that the List had chosen nationalism and separatism over Jewish–Arab solidarity. A post-election analysis showed that no agreement between these left-of-center parties would have made a difference to the final result.

== 2026 platform ==
=== Gaza war and Israeli occupation ===
The party's 2026 platform, which outlines an action plan through 2030, identifies "ending the war in Gaza, ending the occupation, stopping the genocide, and establishing a Palestinian state" as its foremost priority. The platform calls for lifting the blockade of the Gaza Strip, ensuring the unrestricted delivery of humanitarian aid, facilitating Palestinian right of return in accordance with United Nations General Assembly Resolution 194 and restoring the operations of international humanitarian organisations in the Gaza Strip, including the United Nations Relief and Works Agency for Palestine Refugees in the Near East (UNRWA).

The platform also opposes settlement expansion, forced displacement, and settler violence, while calling for the protection of civilians, religious sites, and freedom of religion. It advocates for the establishment of an independent Palestinian state along the pre-1967 borders with East Jerusalem as its capital and calls for a diplomatic process with the Palestine Liberation Organization (PLO) aimed at achieving a comprehensive peace, equality, security, and freedom for both peoples.

=== Socio-economic plan ===
The Joint List's socio-economic plan for the 2026 elections consists of 10 main points: "Investing in life—not in wars. Housing is a right. Free education. A wage that enables living with dignity. Protecting workers' rights. Budgetary equality. Investing in Arab society. Tax The Rich. Stopping privatisation. Strengthening the National Insurance Institute."

The Joint List's Yousef Jabareen further pledged that the list is in favor of raising the taxes on capital owners and corporations, and reducing VAT to 10% (currently 18%). He further pledged in favor of dismantling monopolies and in favor of consumer price control and rent control, reducing military spending, raising the taxes on real-estate investors and more.

=== The plan to eradicate organized crime ===
As one of the most important issues currently for the Arab society in Israel, the Joint List has published a seven point detailed plan to eradicate organized crime from Israeli society. The plan calls for: "Investment in economic development. Restore the rule of law. Hit the pocket—sever the alliance between crime, corruption and privatisations. Strengthen the Arab local authorities and protect them. Move from a culture of 'fixes' to a culture of lawful arrangements. Build a genuine partnership between the state and Arab society—the Coalition for Life against the crime coalition. Ensuring genuine civil equality."

== Knesset members ==
Knesset term	Seats	Faction	Members
20th (2015–2019)	5	Hadash	Ayman Odeh, Aida Touma-Suleiman, Dov Khenin, Yousef Jabareen, Abdullah Abu Ma'aruf
20th (2015–2019)	3	Ra'am	Masud Ghnaim, Abd al-Hakim Hajj Yahya, Taleb Abu Arar
20th (2015–2019)	3	Balad	Jamal Zahalka, Haneen Zoabi, Basel Ghattas (replaced by Juma Azbarga)
20th (2015–2019)	2	Ta'al	Ahmad Tibi, Osama Saadi
22nd (2019–2020)	5	Hadash	Ayman Odeh, Aida Touma-Suleiman, Ofer Cassif, Yousef Jabareen, Jabar Asakla
22nd (2019–2020)	3	Ra'am	Mansour Abbas, Walid Taha, Said al-Harumi
22nd (2019–2020)	3	Balad	Mtanes Shehadeh, Heba Yazbak, Sami Abu Shehadeh
22nd (2019–2020)	2	Ta'al	Ahmad Tibi, Osama Saadi
23rd (2020–2021)	5	Hadash	Ayman Odeh, Aida Touma-Suleiman, Ofer Cassif, Yousef Jabareen, Jabar Asakla
23rd (2020–2021)	4	Ra'am	Mansour Abbas, Walid Taha, Said al-Harumi, Iman Khatib-Yasin
23rd (2020–2021)	3	Balad	Mtanes Shehadeh, Heba Yazbak, Sami Abu Shehadeh
23rd (2020–2021)	3	Ta'al	Ahmad Tibi, Osama Saadi, Sondos Saleh
24th (2021–2022)	3	Hadash	Ayman Odeh, Aida Touma-Suleiman, Ofer Cassif
24th (2021–2022)	2	Ta'al	Ahmad Tibi, Osama Saadi
24th (2021–2022)	1	Balad	Sami Abu Shehadeh
26th (2026–present)	5	Hadash	Yousef Jabareen, Faten Ghattas, Ofer Cassif, Youssef Atauna, Nihaya Washahi
26th (2026–present)	3	Ta'al	Ahmad Tibi, Ahmed Darawshe, Haitham Zahalka
26th (2026–present)	3	Balad	Bakhar Awawdeh, Maha Karkabi, Hassan Nassasra

== Leaders ==
Leader	Took office	Left office
Ayman Odeh	2015	2022
Yousef Jabareen	2026	Incumbent

== Election results ==
=== Knesset ===
Election	Leader	Votes	%	Seats	+/–	Government
2015 (Note: Joint List did not run together in the 2013 Israeli legislative election; seat adjustment calculated from parties that were affiliated with it)	Ayman Odeh	446,583	10.61	13 / 120	▲2	Opposition
Sep 2019 (Note: Joint List did not run together in the April 2019 Israeli legislative election; seat adjustment calculated from parties that were affiliated with it)	Ayman Odeh	470,211	10.60	13 / 120	▲3	Opposition
2020	Ayman Odeh	581,507	12.67	15 / 120	▲2	Opposition
2021 (Note: without Ra'am's seats from 2020)	Ayman Odeh	212,583	4.82	6 / 120	▼5	Opposition
2026 (Note: Joint List did not run together in the 2022 Israeli legislative election; seat adjustment calculated from parties that were affiliated with it)	Yousef Jabareen	500,755	8.80	11 / 120	▲6	TBA
