= Faten Ghattas =

- فاتن غطاس

Faction represented in the Knesset
- 2026–: Joint List

Personal details
- Born: 2 June 1960 (age 66) Rameh, Israel
- Party: Hadash; Maki
- Other political affiliations: Joint List
- Education: Hebrew University of Jerusalem; Sofia University

Faten Ghattas (Arabic: فاتن غطاس; born 2 June 1960) is a Palestinian-Israeli politician who serves as a member of the Knesset for the Joint List since 2026.

== Biography ==
Ghattas was born and raised in the Galilean village of Rameh. Ghattas studied philosophy at the Hebrew University of Jerusalem. In 1985, he moved to Bulgaria and studied political science at Sofia University. During his studies, Ghattas lead the Bulgarian Chapter of Maki. Ghattas returned to Israel in 1990, and was later elected to lead Maki's Rameh Chapter, and was later elected to Maki's National Political Buerau and National Audit Committee. Ghattas simultaneously worked at the Israel Cancer Association, including as a coordinator of its activity in the Arab-Israeli sector.

On 7 September 2026, Ghattas was selected by Hadash's Central Committee to fill the fourth slot on the Joint List's Knesset list for the 2026 election, replacing Jaffar Farah, who withdrew following allegations of sexual assault. He was elected as the party won 11 seats.
