= Ra'am =

Islamist political party

United Arab List הרשימה הערבית המאוחדת القائمة العربية الموحدة
- Leader: Mansour Abbas
- Founded: 1996
- Ideology: Conservatism; Social conservatism; Israeli Arab interests; Historical: Islamism
- National affiliation: Joint List (2015–2019; 2020–2021)
- Seats in Knesset: 8 / 120

Election symbol
- עם ع‌م

Website
- almwahda.com (archived)

The United Arab List, (Note: (Hebrew: הַרְשִׁימָה הַעֲרָבִית הַמְאוּחֶדֶת, HaReshima HaAravit HaMe'uhedet; Arabic: القائمة العربية الموحدة, al-Qā'ima al-'Arabiyya al-Muwaḥḥada)) commonly known by its Hebrew abbreviation Ra'am (Hebrew: רע״מ), is a conservative political party in Israel with Islamist roots. In 2021 it joined the thirty-sixth government. It is currently led by Mansour Abbas.

The party functioned as the political wing of the Southern Branch of the Islamic Movement in Israel (which supported the Oslo I Accord and began participating in Israeli parliamentary elections) until July 2026, when Ra'am announced its separation from the Islamic Movement. It had been part of the Joint List, but left the alliance in January 2021.

In June 2021, Ra'am entered into a coalition government led by Naftali Bennett, becoming the first Arab party since 1977 to join a governing coalition, and the first independent (Note: Several Arab satellite parties were part of the Mapai governments of the 1950s–70s.) Arab party ever to do so.

The party announced in January 2026 that it would open to Jewish candidates on its electoral list, in advance of the 2026 Israeli legislative election, with Yoav Segalovitz announced in late August as the party's first Jewish candidate. The party won eight seats in the election.

== History ==
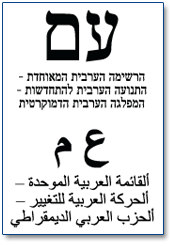
United Arab List election ballot, 2013

=== Establishment ===
The party was established prior to the 1996 election, unrelated to the original United Arab List that existed in the late 1970s and early 1980s. It was joined in an electoral alliance by the Arab Democratic Party (which held two seats in the outgoing parliament) and the southern faction of the Islamic Movement, led by Sheikh Abdullah Nimar Darwish. The party initially went under the title of Mada-Ra'am, Mada being the acronym and common name for the Arab Democratic Party. In the election, the party won four seats. During the Knesset term, the Arab Democratic Party became a faction within the United Arab List, and its name was dropped from the party title.

=== Late 1990s–2010s ===
The 1999 election saw the party increase its share of the vote and pick up five seats. However, internal disagreements saw three MKs leave; Muhamad Kanan and Tawfik Khatib left and established the Arab National Party, while Hashem Mahameed formed the National Unity – National Progressive Alliance party. In the 2003 election, the party's support dropped by more than a third, with the party only just crossing the electoral threshold of 2%, and winning only two seats.

Logo used by the party before 2019

For the 2006 election, the party entered an alliance with Ahmad Tibi's Ta'al party. Running together, the alliance won four seats, three of which were taken by the United Arab List. The partys' alliance was maintained for the 2009 election, which initially saw the Israeli Central Elections Committee ban the party from participating, but this was overturned by the Supreme Court of Israel. In the election, the alliance again won four seats. Shortly before the 2013 election, Taleb el-Sana left the party to sit as an independent Arab Democratic Party member.

=== Joint List ===
After the electoral threshold to gain Knesset seats was raised from 2% to 3.25%, the party joined with Hadash, Balad, Ta'al, and the Islamic Movement to form the Joint List for the 2015 election. For the April 2019 election, it ran on a list with Balad. The party again ran as part of the Joint List in the 2020 election. The alliance split in January 2021.

=== Coalition government ===
In the 2021 elections, the party won four seats in the Knesset. Within the fragmented political landscape of Israel, these seats gave the party the role of kingmaker in determining the next government after Benjamin Netanyahu failed to form one.

The party was open to forming a government with Likud, but Religious Zionist Party leader Bezalel Smotrich opposed the idea. Abbas stated in a 2026 interview with Channel 12 that "foreign actors" were in favor of a Netanyahu government during those talks.

On 2 June 2021, party leader Mansour Abbas signed an agreement to form a coalition government, the first time an independent Arab party became a member of the Israeli government, and the first time in more than 50 years that any Arab party formed part of the Israeli government; a photograph of Abbas, sitting with Yair Lapid and Naftali Bennett, signing the coalition agreement was widely circulated. The agreement included guarantees that more than 53 billion shekels (US$16 billion) would be spent to improve infrastructure and reduce crime in Arab towns, provisions protecting homes built without permits in Arab villages, and recognition for Bedouin towns in the Negev desert.

On 28 October 2021, the cabinet approved a plan to spend US$9.4 billion to improve employment opportunities and health services for Israeli Arabs and improve housing, technology, and infrastructure in Arab areas; it included a further US$1 billion to address high crime rates in Arab areas. In the scale of funding range of issues in the Arab community addressed, the plan had little precedent in Israeli history, and Abbas and Ra'am were widely credited with pushing forward what Abbas called a "historic step" forward for Arab Israelis. The plan was signed into law when the budget passed on 4 November.

At the United Arab List's urging, the coalition government recognized several Bedouin villages and connected thousands of previously illegal homes to the electrical grid.

=== Return to opposition ===
Israeli President Isaac Herzog meeting with Mansour Abbas and other representatives of the Ra'am parliamentary faction at Beit HaNassi in Jerusalem during discussions on judicial reform, 29 March 2023

In the 2022 Knesset elections the party won five seats, gaining an additional seat. The party received most of its votes in Bedouin and Sunni Muslim towns.

In May 2024, Ra'am described Israel's actions in Gaza as war crimes and crimes against humanity. In November 2025, Mansour Abbas called for a new governing arrangement in Gaza based on peace and reconciliation, with Palestinian forces eventually taking responsibility for its administration. He has continued to support a two-state solution and recognition of an independent Palestinian state.

On 5 January 2026, party leader Abbas announced that the party would be open to all Israelis for membership and "aims to recruit Jewish politicians who share Ra'am's agenda" as the Arab community continues to struggle with high crime rates.

The party is willing to work with "anti-Netanyahu parties", while that position is a nonstarter for other Arab parties, including Hadash and Balad.

Abbas confirmed in August 2026 during a joint press conference with former Yesh Atid MK Yoav Segalovitz that Segalovitz had joined the party's slate as part of a technical bloc.

Likud announced on 13 September that it would submit a disqualification request to the Central Elections Committee (CEC) while Otzma Yehudit submitted one the previous week. The CEC voted on 23 September to bar the party from the election, with 18 votes in favor and five against. Attorney General of Israel Gali Baharav-Miara opposed the disqualification. The decision was unanimously overturned by the Supreme Court of Israel on 2 October.

In October 2026, Mansour Abbas said that he no longer considered a coalition with Benjamin Netanyahu to be an option and expressed hope for a change of government through cooperation with opposition parties.

The party won eight seats in the 2026 Israeli legislative election.

== Ideology and support ==
Ra'am was historically an Islamist party. It has been described as a "religious Arab Muslim party". The southern faction of the Islamic Movement had been a major force in the party, where the movement's Shura Council exerted influence on the party's votes in parliament. This connection ended in December 2025 as the party announced its separation from the Southern Islamic Movement to transition towards becoming a "civic party", with the separation finalized in July 2026. Because of this separation, some sources, including The Jerusalem Post and The Times of Israel described the party as transitioning away from being Islamist. Yahya Dahamsha, the head of the party's "political department", who spoke at the party's conference held to mark its 30th anniversary, said that it would no longer need to rely on the approval of the shura council to make decisions.

The party's ideology is socially conservative, including opposition to civil marriages as a "violation of family values" and skepticism towards same-sex marriage.

Its constituency consists mostly of religious or nationalist Israeli Arabs, and enjoys particular popularity among the Negev Bedouin: in the 2009 election, 80% of residents of Bedouin communities voted for the party.

Ra'am has been an advocate for political participation within Israel's domestic political sphere to improve the quality of life of Arab Israelis, particularly with respect to crime, employment opportunities, housing, and infrastructure. For example, the party was open to joining a Netanyahu-led coalition after the 2021 election. The party eventually became a part of the 36th government and was the first Arab-majority party in Israeli history to join a coalition. The focus on domestic policy distinguishes Ra'am from other Arab parties, which historically form part of the opposition and focus on the larger Israeli–Palestinian conflict. Regarding the conflict, Ra'am supports the two-state solution, and the creation of a Palestinian state in the West Bank and Gaza Strip, with East Jerusalem as its capital. However, according to Khaled Elgindy, the Middle East Institute's programme director on Palestine and Palestinian-Israeli Affairs, the party does "not emphasise the need to end the Israeli occupation of Palestinian territories".

== Election results ==
=== Knesset ===
Election	Leader	Votes	%	Seats	+/–	Status
1996	Abdulmalik Dehamshe	With Mada		2 / 120	–	Opposition
1999	Abdulmalik Dehamshe	With Mada		3 / 120	▲1	Opposition
2003	Abdulmalik Dehamshe	With Mada		1 / 120	▼2	Opposition
2006	Ibrahim Sarsur	With Mada and Ta'al		2 / 120	▲1	Opposition
2009	Ibrahim Sarsur	With Mada and Ta'al		2 / 120	Steady	Opposition
2013	Ibrahim Sarsur	With Ta'al		3 / 120	▲1	Opposition
2015	Masud Ghnaim	Part of Joint List		4 / 120	▲1	Opposition
Apr 2019	Mansour Abbas	With Balad		2 / 120	▼2	Snap election
Sep 2019	Mansour Abbas	Part of Joint List		3 / 120	▲1	Snap election
2020	Mansour Abbas	Part of Joint List		4 / 120	▲1	Opposition
2021	Mansour Abbas	167,064	3.79	4 / 120	Steady	Coalition
2022	Mansour Abbas	193,916	4.07	5 / 120	▲1	Opposition
2026	Mansour Abbas	337,720	5.93	8 / 120	▲3	TBA

== Knesset membership ==
=== Current Knesset members ===
- Mansour Abbas
- Yoav Segalovitz
- Waleed Taha
- Waleed Alhwashla
- Iman Khatib-Yassin
- Yasir Hujeirat
- Ibrahim Al-Turi
- Abd El-Karim Masri

=== Former Knesset members ===
- Taleb el-Sana (1996–2012)
- Abdulmalik Dehamshe (1996–2006)
- Mazen Ghnaim (2021–2022)
- Muhamad Kanan (1999–2001)
- Tawfik Khatib (1996–2001)
- Hashem Mahameed (1999–2002)
- Ibrahim Sarsur (2006–2019)
- Masud Ghnaim (2009–2019)
- Talab Abu Arar (2013–2019)
- Abd al-Hakim Hajj Yahya (2019–2020)
- Said al-Harumi (2017–2021)

== See also ==
- Arab members of the Knesset
