= Ta'al =

Arab political party in Israel

Ta'al תע״ל • الحركة العربية للتغيير
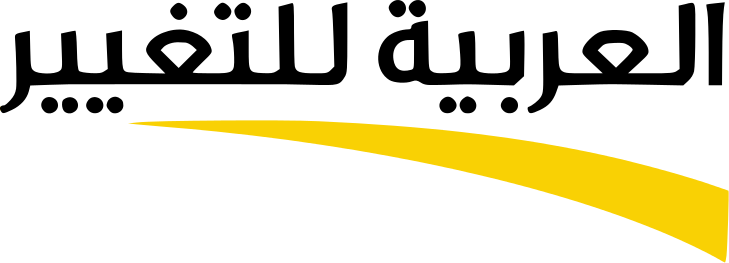
- Hebrew name: תנועה ערבית להתחדשות
- Arabic name: الحركة العربية للتغيير
- Leader: Ahmad Tibi
- Ideology: Arab nationalism; Israeli Arab interests
- Political position: Big tent
- National affiliation: Balad (1999); Ra'am (2006–2013); Joint List (2015–2019; 2019–2021; 2021–2022; 2026–present)
- Knesset: 3 / 120

Election symbol
- נ

Website
- www.amc-a.com a-m-c.org (Archived)

The Arab Movement for Renewal, commonly known by its Hebrew abbreviation Ta'al, (Note: Ta'al is a Hebrew abbreviation for Tnua Aravit LeHithadshut Hebrew: תְּנוּעָה עֲרָבִית לְהִתְחַדְּשׁוּת, lit. 'Arab Movement for Renewal'. Its Arabic name is al-Haraka al-'Arabiyya li-t-Tagyir (Arabic: الحركة العربية للتغيير, lit. 'Arab Movement for Change')) is an anti-Zionist Arab nationalist political party in Israel, led by Ahmad Tibi.

In August 2026 Ta'al joined Hadash and Balad in re-establishing the Joint List ahead of the 2026 election and won three seats.

== History ==
Ta'al was founded by Tibi in the run-up to the 1996 elections where it ran under its original name, Arab Union. The party withdrew from the election shortly before election day but remained on the ballot, winning 2,087 votes (0.1%). Since then, the party has only run on joint lists with other parties. For the 1999 elections it ran as part of the Balad list. Tibi won a seat, and broke away from Balad on 21 December that year. In the 2003 elections the party ran on a joint list with Hadash, with Tibi retaining his seat.

On 7 February 2006 Tibi left the alliance with Hadash. For the 2006 elections the party ran on a joint list with Ra'am, running as "Ra'am–Ta'al". On 12 January 2009, the Ra'am–Ta'al list was disqualified from the 2009 elections by the Central Elections Committee. Twenty-one committee members voted in favor of its disqualification, with eight members voting against and two members abstaining. Tibi said the decision was related to Operation Cast Lead, claiming "this is a racist country. We are accustomed to these types of struggles and we will win" and that "this decision strives for a Knesset without Arabs that will only lead to the increased solidarity between the Arab public and its leadership". He said he would appeal to the Israeli High Court of Justice. On 21 January the High Court of Justice overturned the Committee's decision unanimously. Tibi welcomed the decision and said: "We have beaten fascism. This fight is over but the battle is not. Racism has become a trend in Israel ... the court's decision has righted a wrong by Kadima and Labor". The list won four seats, with Tibi retaining his place in the Knesset.

The party was part of the Joint List in the 2015 election, before it withdrew in January 2019, though it decided to rejoin the alliance for the September 2019 election and ran as part of it in the 2020 election as well. It left the alliance again on 28 January 2021, until it rejoined once again on 3 February.

Samir Bin Said became a Knesset member in June 2025, replacing Hadash MK Youssef Atauna as part of a rotation agreement.

On 19 August 2026, Ta'al reached an agreement with Hadash and Balad to re-establish the Joint List ahead of the 2026 election. Under the agreement, Tibi was placed second on the joint slate after Yousef Jabareen of Hadash and before Sami Abu Shehadeh of Balad. Tibi is also expected to serve as chairman of the alliance's parliamentary faction.

== Ideology ==
Ta'al supports an Israeli withdrawal to the pre-1967 green lines and a two-state solution, with a Palestinian state established alongside Israel in the West Bank and Gaza Strip.

Ta'al has been often described as secular. Despite this the party was an ally of the Islamist Ra'am and ran on their list between 2006 and 2015. Additionally their leader Tibi has been criticized for homophobic comments in 2019.

The party is described as (Arab) nationalist but more moderate compared to Balad.

== Election results ==
=== Knesset ===
Election	Leader	Votes	%	Seats	+/–	Status
1996 (Note: Withdrew from the election shortly before election day, but remained on the ballot.)	Ahmad Tibi	2,087	0.07 (#19)	0 / 120	Steady	Extra-parliamentary
1999	Ahmad Tibi	part of Balad		1 / 120	▲1	Opposition
2003	Ahmad Tibi	with Hadash (Note: Hadash-Ta'al)		1 / 120	Steady	Opposition
2006	Ahmad Tibi	with Ra'am		1 / 120	Steady	Opposition
2009	Ahmad Tibi	with Ra'am		1 / 120	Steady	Opposition
2013	Ahmad Tibi	with Ra'am		1 / 120	Steady	Opposition
2015	Ahmad Tibi	part of Joint List		1 / 120	Steady	Opposition
Apr 2019	Ahmad Tibi	with Hadash		2 / 120	▲1	Snap election
Sep 2019	Ahmad Tibi	part of Joint List		2 / 120	Steady	Snap election
2020	Ahmad Tibi	part of Joint List		3 / 120	▲1	Opposition
2021	Ahmad Tibi	part of Joint List		2 / 120	▼1	Opposition
2022	Ahmad Tibi	with Hadash		1 / 120	▼1	Opposition
2026	Ahmad Tibi	part of Joint List		3 / 120	▲2	TBA
