= Balad (political party) =

Political party in Israel

Balad בל״ד بلد
- Leader: Sami Abu Shehadeh
- Founded: 1995
- Preceded by: Progressive List for Peace (faction)
- Headquarters: Nazareth, Israel
- Student wing: Democratic Student Gathering (Jafra)
- Youth wing: National Democratic Youth Union (Aitihad Alshabab)
- Ideology: Palestinian nationalism (Note: Attributed to multiple references:); Arab nationalism (Note: Attributed to multiple references:); Social democracy; Secularism; Pan-Arabism
- Political position: Left-wing (Note: Attributed to multiple references:) to far-left (Note: Attributed to multiple references:)
- National affiliation: Joint List (2015–2019; 2020–2022; 2026–present)
- Colours: Orange
- Knesset: 3 / 120

Election symbol
- ض or ד

Website
- www.altajamoa.org
- Politics of Israel; Political parties; Elections; A: Balad is sometimes considered left-wing but in Israeli political discourse it is often described as "far-left", largely due to its opposition to Israel as a Jewish nation-state. In 2022, Israel's Central Elections Committee stated that the party "rejects Israel’s existence as a Jewish and democratic state."

Balad (Hebrew: בָּלַ״ד, Arabic: بلد, lit. 'Country') is a left-wing to far-left Palestinian nationalist political party in Israel led by Sami Abu Shehadeh. In August 2026, Balad joined Hadash and Ta'al in re-establishing the Joint List ahead of the 2026 election. The party won three seats.

The party is most commonly known by the abbreviation of its Hebrew name, Brit Leumit Demokratit (Hebrew: בְּרִית לְאֻמִּית דֵּמוֹקְרָטִית, lit. 'National Democratic Alliance'), which coincides with the Arabic word for "country" or "nation" (Arabic: بلد). Its full Arabic name is at-Tajammuʿ al-Waṭanī ad-Dīmuqrāṭī (Arabic: التجمع الوطني الديمقراطي, lit. 'National Democratic Assembly').

== History ==
=== 1990s ===
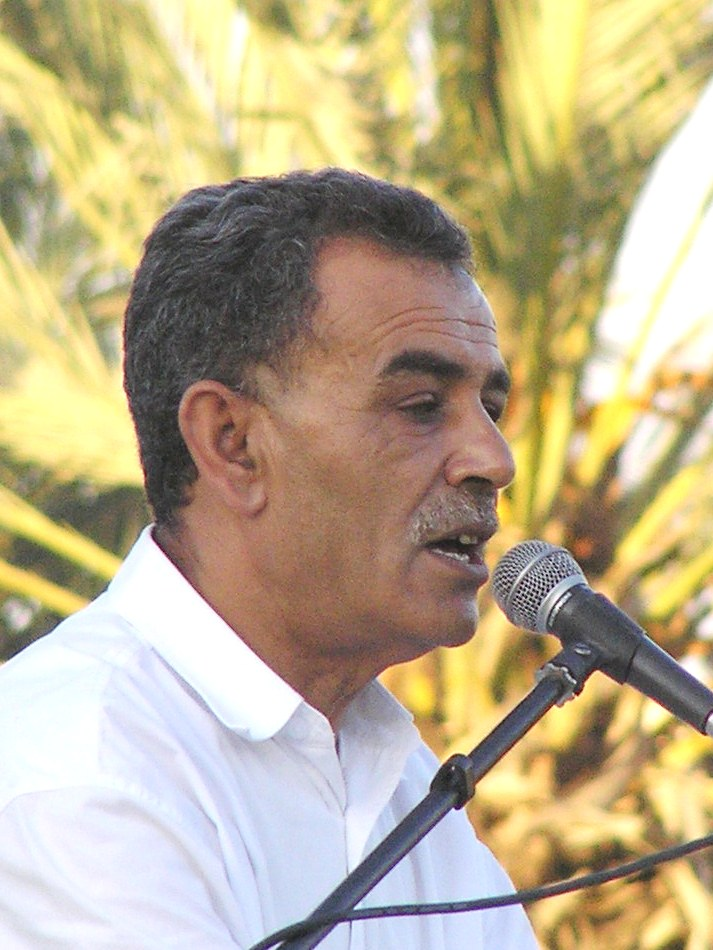
Jamal Zahalka, a former leader of the party

Balad was formed and registered as a political party in 1995, by a group of young Israeli Arab intellectuals headed by Azmi Bishara. In the 1999 elections, Balad ran on a joint ticket with Ta'al, headed by MK Ahmad Tibi. They won two seats. However, a request was submitted that same year for the list to disband, and did so after the Knesset approved the request. Bishara remained its only member.

=== 2000s ===
In 2001 party leader Azmi Bishara gave a speech in Umm al-Fahm on the 33rd anniversary of Israel's victory in the Six-Day War, deploring it, and later visited Syria and gave a speech mourning the death of Syria's president, Hafez al-Assad a year before, and expressing solidarity with Syria's and Hezbollah's fight against Israel. Upon his return to Israel, parliamentary immunity was removed from him by a vote of the Israeli Knesset, and in 2002 he was charged and indicted for supporting terrorist organizations against Israel and siding with her enemies, and also for violating Israel's Emergency Regulations in that he knowingly assisted Israeli citizens to enter Syria without approval of the Minister of Interior. The trial was however cancelled, after The High Court of Justice ruled in favor of a petition submitted by Bishara where he protested that his speeches were protected by legal immunity, which is granted to all Knesset members in order to allow them to fulfill their duties. His parliamentary immunity was immediately restored.

Prior to the 2003 elections, the Central Elections Committee banned the party from running by a one-vote margin, claiming it did not respect Israel's legally-mandated status as a Jewish state and that its leader supported terrorism. The move to ban Balad was initiated by Michael Kleiner, the leader of the right-wing Herut party, who alleged that Balad was "a cover-up for illegal activity" and that it "supports terror organizations, identifies with the enemy and acts against Israel as a Jewish and democratic state". The Gush Shalom activist group criticized the decision saying it introduced into the committee the "aggressive, predatory and racist attitudes of the majority of the extreme right" who they believe favor banning all Arab MKs. Bishara personally responded to the Election Committee's charges that he supported Hezbollah by saying, "I believe that a people living under occupation [have] the right to fight against it, but I never called on the Palestinians to embark on an armed struggle against Israel. I never supported violent activity." The Elections Committee had also voted to ban Ahmad Tibi of the Ta'al party who had formed an electoral alliance with the left wing Hadash coalition.

However, the bans on both parties were overturned by the Israeli Supreme Court. Supreme Court Justice Misha'el Kheshin told the election committee that Bishara's past expressions of support for Hezbollah in Lebanon had angered him, although he voted to allow him to run in the elections because "Israel's democracy is strong and can tolerate irregular cases", and thought that there was insufficient evidence for the ban. Balad won three seats in the elections, filled by Bishara, Wasil Taha, and Jamal Zahalka.

In the 2006 elections Balad won three seats, which were taken by Bishara, Taha, and Zahalka. However, more controversy was to come when, after the 2006 Lebanon War, all three visited Syria and Lebanon in September 2006 and expressed solidarity for Hezbollah in its fight against Israel. Particularly strong statements were made by Bishara. They returned to Israel on 16 September, saying they planned to return to Syria again "if necessary". A police investigation was launched into their activities in enemy territories.

Following this, Bishara was charged anew with supporting terrorism against Israelis, to which was added the charge of treason and various other criminal charges including receiving large sums of money from a foreign agent in return for his services, and money laundering. Although he promised to return from a few days' trip abroad to continue questioning by the authorities, after several weeks in other Arab states he instead resigned from the Knesset at the Israeli Embassy in Cairo on 22 April 2007. Bishara denied the charges but did not return to Israel to face court proceedings. He was said to be "considering staying abroad because he feared a long term jail sentence and an end to his political career". Bishara was replaced in the Knesset by Said Nafa. Abroad, Bishara actively promoted political charges of "apartheid" against Israel in various Arab and Western venues, travelling widely. Nevertheless, he continued to accept Israeli pension payments made to former Knesset members for nearly four years, until, in February 2011, the Knesset passed a bill revoking pensions for lawmakers who have evaded an investigation or trial for serious offenses.

On 12 January 2009 Balad was disqualified from the 2009 Israeli elections by the Central Elections Committee by a vote of 26 to 3, with one abstention. It was disqualified on grounds that it does not recognize the State of Israel and calls for armed conflict against it. Zahalka argued that the decision was related to Operation Cast Lead, and said that he is not surprised by it "because the vote was taken for political motives due to the war atmosphere. ... The committee members sought to increase their popularity at our expense on the backdrop of the elections." On 19 January Attorney General Menachem Mazuz, said that he saw no grounds to prevent the Balad from taking part in the election, and noted that the decision was based on "flimsy evidence". On 21 January the Supreme Court of Israel overturned the committee's decision by a majority of eight to one. Zahalka said: "Balad stands by its platform. The court's decision is a victory to the Arab public and to anyone who seeks democracy. ... We call on everyone to back the notion of 'a people state' and a life of equality bar discrimination." Balad maintained its three seats in the Knesset in 2009 elections.

=== 2010s ===
In 2010 Balad MK Haneen Zoabi took part in the Gaza flotilla and was on the MV Mavi Marmara when clashes broke out between Israeli soldiers and armed protesters, the day after then gave a speech in the Knesset about the flotilla the next day, another MK attempted to physically stop her but was restrained.

In the 2013 Knesset elections Balad retained its three seats.

In 2014, Zoabi gave an interview in which she said that the Hamas militants responsible for the 2014 kidnapping and murder of 3 Israeli teenagers were not terrorists. She additionally authored an editorial on a Hamas website calling for Palestinians to “besiege” Israel. The Knesset investigated her for incitement and she was suspended from all Knesset activities except voting for 6 months.

Ahead of the 2015 Knesset election, the electoral threshold was raised from 2% to 3.25%, forcing small parties into alliances. While Balad had initially mulled a narrower cooperation with the southern branch of Islamist Islamic Movement in Israel, public pressure amongst its Arab constituency forced the party to give in to a larger alliance. In January 2015, Balad signed an agreement with the other three Arab-dominated parties, Hadash, Ra'am and Ta'al, to form a single Joint List, an ideologically diverse list including communists, socialists, feminists, Islamists, and Palestinian nationalists.

In early 2016 3 Balad MK's met with the families of 10 deceased Palestinian militants, some of whom had committed terrorists attacks against Israel, and later stood in a moment of silence for "Palestinian Martyrs". The 3 were suspended from all Knesset duties besides voting for 3 or 6 months. That same year MK Haneen Zoabi called IDF soldiers "murderers" almost starting a brawl inside the Knesset.

In March Joint List leader Ayman Odeh explored the possibility of a limited surplus vote-sharing agreement with Meretz. After Hadash and Ra'am had come out in favor of such a left-wing bloc, Balad however vehemently opposed the idea. Though even within Balad, the more moderate faction around Jamal Zahalka was said to support an agreement, sided with the fundamentalist faction around party founder Azmi Bishara to ultimately veto any agreement with Meretz. Meretz subsequently slammed the List for having chosen nationalism and separatism over Jewish–Arab solidarity. With 11% of the vote, the Joint List won 13 seats, becoming the third-largest party in the 20th Knesset. Two of the thirteen seats were taken by Balad. Basel Ghattas, a Balad MK from 2013-2017 resigned his parliamentary immunity and was charged with smuggling contraband notes and cellphones to Palestinian Prisoners in Israel, he pleaded guilty and served 2 years in prison.

The Joint List was dissolved ahead of the April 2019 Knesset elections, which Balad contested in alliance with Ra'am. The list received 3% of the vote and won four seats, two of which were taken by Balad. The Joint List was reformed for the September 2019 Knesset elections and won 13 seats, three of which were held by Balad.

=== 2020s ===
The party remained a member of the Joint List for the 2020 Knesset elections. The alliance won 15 seats, three of which went to Balad. However, after Ra'am left the alliance, the Joint List won six seats in the 2021 Knesset elections, with Balad reduced to a single seat. Balad opted to contest the 2022 Knesset elections alone. The party received 2.9% of the vote, failing to cross the electoral threshold and losing its parliamentary representation.

In 2024, after a car bomb went off in an Arab area, killing 4 and injuring 1, Balad accused the Israeli government of failing to properly tackle crime in Arab areas, arguing that the Israeli government intentionally allows crime in Arab areas as part of an Israeli conspiracy against Palestinians across the world.

On 19 August 2026, Balad reached an agreement with Hadash and Ta'al to re-establish the Joint List ahead of the 2026 election. Under the agreement, Balad chairman Sami Abu Shehadeh was placed third on the joint slate after Yousef Jabareen and Ahmad Tibi.

== Ideology and political positions ==
Balad defines itself as a "democratic party that represents the Arab citizens of Israel as a Palestinian Arab nationalist party". Its stated purpose is the "struggle to transform the state of Israel into a democracy for all its citizens, irrespective of national or ethnic identity". The party also seeks to "promote advancement of women’s status and to work towards full equality between men and women". It opposes the nation-state law, passed in 2018, which defines Israel as "the nation-state of the Jewish people", and supports a reformation of the country as a "democratic and secular" state, advocating separation of religion and state in Israel.

Balad also advocates that, in accordance with the UN charter, the state of Israel recognize Palestinian Arabs as a national minority, entitled to full economic, cultural and political rights associated with that status, including an end to discrimination and autonomy in education, culture, and media. Since the party's formation, it has objected to every proposed state budget.

Balad supports a one-state solution in which there would be a single Palestinian state "for all its citizens", with a right of return for all Palestinians. The party also calls for an end to the occupation of Palestinian territories, and for Israel to withdraw from the West Bank, Gaza, and East Jerusalem.

== Leaders ==
- Azmi Bishara (1995–2007)
- Jamal Zahalka (2007–2019)
- Mtanes Shehadeh (2019–2021)
- Sami Abu Shehadeh (2021–present)

== Election results ==
=== Knesset ===
Election	Leader	Votes	%	Seats	+/–	Government
1996	Azmi Bishara	with Hadash		1 / 120	New	Opposition
1999 (Note: In alliance with Ta'al.)	Azmi Bishara	66,103	1.9 (#14)	1 / 120	0	Opposition
2003	Azmi Bishara	71,299	2.26 (#11)	3 / 120	▲2	Opposition
2006	Azmi Bishara	72,066	2.30 (#12)	3 / 120	0	Opposition
2009	Jamal Zahalka	83,739	2.48 (#12)	3 / 120	0	Opposition
2013	Jamal Zahalka	97,030	2.56 (#11)	3 / 120	0	Opposition
2015	Jamal Zahalka	part of Joint List		3 / 120	0	Opposition
Apr 2019	Mtanes Shehadeh	with Ra'am		2 / 120	▼1	Snap election
Sep 2019	Mtanes Shehadeh	part of Joint List		3 / 120	▲1	Snap election
2020	Mtanes Shehadeh	part of Joint List		3 / 120	0	Opposition
2021	Sami Abu Shehadeh	part of Joint List		1 / 120	▼2	Opposition
2022	Sami Abu Shehadeh	138,093	2.90 (#12)	0 / 120	▼1	Extra-parliamentary
2026	Sami Abu Shehadeh	part of Joint List		3 / 120	▲3	TBA
