= September 2019 Israeli legislative election =

- 17 September 2019
- All 120 seats in the Knesset; 61 seats needed for a majority
- Turnout: 69.83% (▲1.37pp)
Party	Leader	Vote %	Seats	+/–
Blue and White	Benny Gantz	25.95	33	−2
Likud	Benjamin Netanyahu	25.10	32	−6
Joint List	Ayman Odeh	10.60	13	+3
Shas	Aryeh Deri	7.44	9	+1
Yisrael Beiteinu	Avigdor Lieberman	6.99	8	+3
UTJ	Yaakov Litzman	6.06	7	−1
Yamina	Ayelet Shaked	5.87	7	+1
Labor–Gesher	Amir Peretz	4.80	6	0
Democratic Union	Nitzan Horowitz	4.34	5	+1
This lists parties that won seats. See the complete results below.
Prime Minister before	Prime Minister after
Benjamin Netanyahu (caretaker government); Likud	Benjamin Netanyahu (caretaker government); Likud

Legislative elections were held in Israel on 17 September 2019 to elect the 120 members of the 22nd Knesset. Following the previous elections in April, incumbent Prime Minister Benjamin Netanyahu failed to form a governing coalition. On 30 May, the Knesset voted to dissolve itself and trigger new elections, in order to prevent Blue and White party leader Benny Gantz from being appointed Prime Minister-designate. This election marked the first time the Knesset voted to dissolve itself before a government had been formed.

== Background ==
Following the April 2019 elections, Likud leader and incumbent Prime Minister Benjamin Netanyahu had until the end of 29 May to form a governing coalition, including a two-week extension granted by President Reuven Rivlin. Though the deadline passed without a coalition being formed and Rivlin would have been tasked with appointing a new Prime Minister-designate, presumed to be Blue and White party head Benny Gantz, Netanyahu successfully pushed to dissolve the Knesset to avoid this.

Negotiations between Netanyahu and a number of potential coalition partners stalled. One sticking point between Netanyahu and Yisrael Beiteinu leader Avigdor Lieberman was the passage of a draft law which is opposed by the Haredi parties in the coalition. The law would remove the current exemption of yeshiva students from conscription. Netanyahu needed both Yisrael Beitenu and the Haredi parties in his coalition in order to have enough seats to form a majority.

As an alternative, Netanyahu approached Labor about the possibility of their support, but they rejected the offer. Meanwhile, Netanyahu's legal troubles overshadowed further possible coalition negotiations, with Blue and White refusing to work with him in the circumstances. The new elections also mean Netanyahu's proposed immunity law cannot proceed for the time being.

On 28 May, the Knesset passed on first reading a bill which would dissolve the Knesset and force a snap election. This move was intended to place additional pressure on coalition partners to reach an agreement in time, as well as to prevent Gantz from being given the opportunity to put together a coalition should the deadline pass. Later that day, the committee approved the bill for second and third reading.

Late in the evening on 29 May, it was announced that talks had failed. That night, and into the morning of 30 May, the Knesset passed second and third readings of the bill to dissolve itself and force a snap election with a vote of 74 in favour to 45 against. The 45 votes against the resolution came from the entire membership of three parties: the Blue and White alliance (35 votes), Labor (6 votes), and Meretz (4 votes). All other Knesset members voted for the resolution, with the exception of Roy Folkman, who was absent.

The election was held on 17 September 2019.

== Electoral system ==
The 120 seats in the Knesset are elected by closed list proportional representation in a single nationwide constituency. The electoral threshold for the election is 3.25%. In most cases, this implies a minimum party size of four seats, but it is mathematically possible for a party to pass the electoral threshold and have only three seats (since 3.25% of 120 members = 3.9 members).

=== Surplus-vote agreements ===
Two parties can sign a surplus-vote agreement that allows them to compete for leftover seats as though they are running together on the same list. The Bader–Ofer method disproportionately favors larger lists, meaning that such an alliance is more likely to receive leftover seats than both of its comprising lists would be individually. If the alliance receives leftover seats, the Bader–Ofer calculation is then applied privately, to determine how the seats are divided among the two allied lists. The following agreements were signed by parties prior to the election:

- Yamina and Likud
- Democratic Union and Labor–Gesher
- United Torah Judaism and Shas
- Blue and White and Yisrael Beiteinu

== Parties ==
=== Factions before the election ===
The table below lists the parliamentary factions represented in the 21st Knesset.

Name	Ideology	Symbol	Primary demographic	Leader	April 2019 result	
Name	Ideology	Symbol	Primary demographic	Leader	Votes (%)	Seats
Likud	Conservatism; National liberalism	מחל	–	Benjamin Netanyahu	26.46%	35 / 120
Blue and White	Liberalism	פה	–	Benny Gantz, Yair Lapid	26.13%	35 / 120
Shas	Religious conservatism	שס	Sephardi and Mizrahi Haredim	Aryeh Deri	5.99%	8 / 120
United Torah Judaism	Religious conservatism	ג	Ashkenazi Haredim	Yaakov Litzman	5.78%	8 / 120
Hadash–Ta'al	Communism; Arab nationalism	ום	Israeli Arabs	Ayman Odeh	4.49%	6 / 120
Labor	Social democracy	אמת	–	Avi Gabbay	4.43%	6 / 120
Yisrael Beiteinu	Nationalism; Secularism	ל	Russian-speakers	Avigdor Lieberman	4.01%	5 / 120
Union of Right-Wing Parties	Religious conservatism	טב	Modern Orthodox and Chardal Jews	Rafi Peretz	3.70%	5 / 120
Meretz	Progressivism; Secularism	מרצ	–	Tamar Zandberg	3.63%	4 / 120
Kulanu	Economic egalitarianism	כ	–	Moshe Kahlon	3.54%	4 / 120
Ra'am–Balad	Islamism; Arab nationalism	דעם	Israeli Arabs	Mansour Abbas	3.33%	4 / 120

=== Retiring incumbents ===
The table below lists all members of the Knesset (MK) who did not stand for re-election.

Party	Name	Year first elected
Kulanu	Roy Folkman	2015
Israeli Labor Party	Avi Gabbay	April 2019
Israeli Labor Party	Tal Russo	April 2019
Israeli Labor Party	Shelly Yachimovich	2006

=== Contesting parties ===
The Likud (election symbol: מחל) was tied with Blue and White for the largest political party in the 21st Knesset, with 35 of the 120 seats. It is the party of Israel's current prime minister, Benjamin Netanyahu, who is seeking to gain more power to build a government after failing to do so following the April election. Prior to the September election, the Likud and Kulanu parties announced on 29 May their intention to run together in the new election. Kulanu officially dissolved itself and its remaining members joined the Likud on 31 July, bringing Likud's Knesset representation up to 38 seats.

The Blue and White (election symbol: פה) alliance was created ahead of the April 2019 election and ended up being tied with Likud for the largest political party in the 21st Knesset, with 35 seats. Despite suggestions that the alliance should make changes due to their failure to achieve a majority in the April election, the alliance confirmed on 2 June 2019 that it will keep the same rotating premiership of Benny Gantz and Yair Lapid as in the previous election. The party decided to run with the almost exact same list as they did in the April elections. Blue and White has ruled out sitting with Benjamin Netanyahu, due to the corruption investigations against him; however, it has not ruled out creating a National unity government with Likud if it replaced Netanyahu.

The Joint List (election symbol: ודעם) alliance (which was dissolved ahead of the April 2019 elections) was reformed ahead of the September 2019 elections. It is made up of four ideologically diverse Arab Israeli parties, who together had 10 seats in the 21st Knesset. The Ra'am, Hadash, and Ta'al factions announced on 27 July that the alliance would be re-established, Balad decided to join the next day. The list is led by Hadash Chairman Ayman Odeh, who also led the alliance in the 2015 election. Odeh said he is open to cooperation with Blue and White, but he would not join their coalition.

Shas (election symbol: שס) was the third largest political party in the 21st Knesset, with eight seats. Shas is led by Minister of Interior Aryeh Deri. Shas is a Mizrahi and Sephardi Haredi party, primarily concerned with rights and funding for those demographics. Shas declared early on that it was going to support Benjamin Netanyahu for prime minister, and ruled out sitting with Blue and White, due to disagreements with Blue and White leader Yair Lapid.

United Torah Judaism (UTJ) (election symbol: ג) was the fourth largest political alliance in the 21st Knesset, with eight seats. UTJ is an alliance of two Ashkenazi Haredi parties (Agudat Yisrael and Degel HaTorah), and is mainly concerned with preserving funding and rights for their sector of the population. UTJ is led by Deputy Minister of Health Yaakov Litzman. Much like its Mizrahi counterpart Shas, UTJ declared early on that it was going to support Benjamin Netanyahu for prime minister, and ruled out sitting with Blue and White, due to disagreements with Blue and White leader Yair Lapid.

The Labor–Gesher (election symbol: אמת) alliance includes the Labor party, which was the sixth largest party in the 21st Knesset with six seats, and Gesher, a party led by Orly Levy-Abekasis which did not pass the electoral threshold in the April election. Due to its collapse in the April election, Labor held its leadership primary on 2 July, which was won by Amir Peretz. Following his victory, Peretz rejected merging into a greater leftist bloc and declared that he wanted to bring in new crowds to the party, and it was announced on 18 July 2019 that Labor and Gesher will run on a joint list, with seven seats on the list reserved for Labor and three for Gesher.

Yisrael Beiteinu (election symbol: ל) was the seventh largest party in the 21st Knesset, with five seats. The party has been led since its founding by Avigdor Lieberman, and it is running with the same list it presented in the April election. Lieberman sparked the repeat election by refusing to join Netanyahu's coalition, citing differences with the Haredi parties over drafting Haredi into the military. Due to his opposition to Netanyahu's Haredi coalition partners, Lieberman has declared that he will support only a unity government between Likud and Blue & White.

Yamina (election symbol: טב) is an alliance of several Religious Zionist parties headed by Ayelet Shaked. It is made up of the Union of Right-Wing Parties, which was the eighth largest party in the Knesset with five seats, and the New Right, which did not pass the electoral threshold. After long-winded negotiations between the two factions, URWP leader Rafi Peretz agreed on 28 July to give Ayelet Shaked the number one spot on the United Right list. The next day, an agreement between the Union of Right-Wing Parties and the New Right was announced. The two parties of the URWP, Tkuma and The Jewish Home, both voted on and approved the run with the New Right on 31 July. Part of the deal stipulated that the list would support Benjamin Netanyahu for the position of prime minister, despite resistance to this from the New Right.

The Democratic Union (election symbol: מרצ) alliance includes several left-wing parties, who decided to run together in the September elections. The alliance was announced on 25 July 2019 and is led by Nitzan Horowitz. It will be made up of Meretz, the ninth largest party in the 21st Knesset with four seats, the new Israel Democratic Party formed by former prime minister Ehud Barak, Israeli Labor Party defector Stav Shaffir, and the extra-parliamentary Green Movement. The alliance declared that it would not sit with Netanyahu under any circumstances.

Otzma Yehudit (election symbol: כף) was part of the Union of Right-Wing Parties in the April elections, but left after URWP members would not resign to allow Itamar Ben-Gvir to become a Knesset member; in addition, Otzma was unwilling to leave Baruch Marzel and Ben-Zion Gopstein off the electoral slate, as demanded by Rafi Peretz. Otzma is led by Ben-Gvir. The United Right (which later renamed itself Yamina) attempted to convince Otzma Yehudit to re-enter their alliance, but Otzma declined their offer, calling it "insulting". Otzma Yehudit initially signed a deal with Noam, but ran independently following a split between itself and Noam.

=== Withdrawn parties ===
Zehut (election symbol: ז) was the 13th largest party in the April election, receiving 2.74% of the vote and not passing the electoral threshold. Zehut is led by Moshe Feiglin. The party was initially interested in running in a joint list with the New Right, but was rejected when the New Right decided to run with the URWP instead. Following this, Zehut decided it would run alone. On 29 August 2019, Zehut leader Moshe Feiglin announced an agreement with Prime Minister Netanyahu had been reached and that Zehut would withdraw from the election in return for Feiglin serving as a minister in the next government, and the promise that Likud will implement some of Zehut's economic and cannabis reforms. Tamar Zandberg of the Democratic Union said her party plans to appeal the deal to the Central Elections Committee, on the grounds that the deal might constitute election bribery under Israeli law. The deal was approved in a referendum by 77% of Zehut party members on 1 September.

Noam (election symbol: כ) is a new religious Zionist party which was announced on 12 July 2019, which will be backed by Rabbi Zvi Thau of the Har Hamor yeshiva and led by Rabbi Dror Aryeh. The party announced on 28 July that it had agreed to a joint run with Otzma Yehudit, which Otzma approved the next day, though they split on 1 August because Noam did not agree with Otzma including a secular Jewish candidate on the combined list. Following the failed deal with Otzma, Noam decided to run alone. The party launched a signature campaign on 27 August to gauge support, and dropped out of the race on 15 September.

== Opinion polls ==
These graphs show the polling trends from the time Knesset dissolved until the election day. No polls may be published from the end of Friday before the election until the polling stations closing on election day at 22:00.

If more than one poll was conducted on the same day, the graphs show the average of the polls for that date.

== Allegations of misconduct ==
During election day, a number of parties complained to the Election Committee. Blue and White, Yamina, and the Israeli Labor Party complained that a number of polling stations had fake slips for their parties. Due to multiple claims of voting slip vandalism, the Central Elections Committee instructed election officials to count the slip as long as the letters were right and, if the slip was vandalized, with the sole purpose of invalidating it.

The official election committee published a notice regarding people who were impersonating committee officials in Kafr Qasim.

Likud was criticised for giving out gifts at polling stations in Netanya and Kfar Saba.

Facebook suspended a chatbot on Netanyahu's Facebook account for 24 hours on 12 September for "hate speech", after it said that "a dangerous left-wing government" would rely on Arabs "who want to destroy us all—women, children, and men—and enable a nuclear Iran that would wipe us out"; Netanyahu remarked that he didn't write the statement, blamed a campaign staffer for the wording, and that the problem with the bot was immediately fixed.

On 25 September, the Central Election Commission revised its official vote count, giving Likud one extra seat at the cost of United Torah Judaism. The committee further announced that there was "real evidence of apparent vote tampering" in at least six polling stations.

== Results ==
Party	Votes	%	Seats	+/–
Blue and White	1,151,214	25.95	33	–2
Likud	1,113,617	25.10	32	–6
Joint List	470,211	10.60	13	+3
Shas	330,199	7.44	9	+1
Yisrael Beiteinu	310,154	6.99	8	+3
United Torah Judaism	268,775	6.06	7	–1
Yamina	260,655	5.87	7	+1
Labor–Gesher	212,782	4.80	6	0
Democratic Union	192,495	4.34	5	+1
Otzma Yehudit	83,609	1.88	0	0
Tzomet	14,805	0.33	0	0
Popular Unity	5,946	0.13	0	New
Red and White	4,358	0.10	0	New
Justice	3,053	0.07	0	New
Secular Right	2,395	0.05	0	New
Respect and Equality	1,545	0.03	0	New
Our Rights In Our Vote	1,473	0.03	0	0
Pirate Party	1,236	0.03	0	0
Economic Power	1,193	0.03	0	New
Liberal Democratic Progressive Party	1,033	0.02	0	New
Kama	994	0.02	0	New
New Order	928	0.02	0	0
Democracy Party	736	0.02	0	New
North	725	0.02	0	New
Liberal Christian Movement	610	0.01	0	0
Da'am Workers Party	592	0.01	0	0
Human Dignity	542	0.01	0	0
Bible Bloc	497	0.01	0	0
Social Leadership	434	0.01	0	New
Total	4,436,806	100.00	120	0
Valid votes	4,436,806	99.36		
Invalid/blank votes	28,362	0.64		
Total votes	4,465,168	100.00		
Registered voters/turnout	6,394,030	69.83		
Source: CEC, The Times of Israel

=== Members of the Knesset who lost their seats ===
Party	Name	Year elected	Notes
The Jewish Home	Eli Ben-Dahan	2013	
Meretz	Issawi Frej	2013	
Blue and White	Yorai Lahav-Hertzanu	2019	
Blue and White	Idan Roll	2019	
Likud	Uzi Dayan	2019	
Likud	May Golan	2019	
Likud	Osnat Mark	2018	
Likud	Fateen Mulla	2019	
Likud	Ariel Kellner	2019	
United Torah Judaism	Yitzhak Pindros	2019	

== Aftermath ==
The do-over election did not provide a clear view of the next government, as none could be formed without at least one party or leader reneging on their campaign promises on who should be prime minister, or on the religious-secular issue. Some mentioned the possibility of a third election. The day before the election, Benny Gantz called President Reuven Rivlin to try to avoid a third election at all costs, after Benjamin Netanyahu had refused to rule them out.

On election night, Avigdor Lieberman of Yisrael Beiteinu called for a "broad liberal government" that includes both Blue and White and Likud, and reiterated that he did not want to form any majority with the Arab parties. Benny Gantz claimed Prime ministership and Blue and White repeated that they would not form a government with Netanyahu, although they were open to one with Likud. Benyamin Netanyahu called for a "strong Zionist government". On the left, Labor–Gesher stated it wanted to bring Arab parties "to the table", some of which are open to recommending Gantz.

On 18 September, Netanyahu met with the emissaries of Yamina, Shas, and UTJ, to build a right-wing bloc to negotiate together.

On 19 September, Rivlin, Netanyahu and Gantz met during a memorial ceremony for Shimon Peres. Netanyahu urged Gantz to speak with him about forming a unity government, for the sake of avoiding a third round of elections. Speaking for Blue and White, Gantz and Lapid both rejected Netanyahu's offer, saying Blue and White had won, and that Gantz had the right to lead a unity government committed to liberal policies on social issues, and thus refusing to discuss forming such a government with Netanyahu as long as right-wing religious parties were included. Lapid remarked that "if Netanyahu steps aside, we'll have a unity government". Lieberman likewise accused Netanyahu of "deception" by offering a unity government, but conditioning it on the inclusion of religious parties.

The same day, Gantz met with Horowitz. His aides said they expect a meeting with other party leaders, Odeh and Peretz. Labor–Gesher's six MKs could allow Netanyahu's bloc of 55 to find a majority. Likud thus reportedly offered Peretz the Finance portfolio, and a raise of the minimum wage, but the same sources say Peretz turned down the offer, which goes against a campaign vow. Netanyahu met with Degel HaTorah MKs, who, along with other Haredi parties (Shas, Agudat Yisrael), are starting to backtrack on their refusal not to govern with Lapid, in the case Lapid himself U-turns on Netanyahu. Lieberman was equivocal as to whether he would support Gantz, fearing to be sidelined from a unity government, or one that includes Haredim. According to Channel 13, Gantz reportedly promised to include Yisrael Beiteinu in any coalition.

On 21 September, the 13 MKs from the Joint List met together. 10 of them—with three Balad MKs dissenting—expressed their readiness to nominate Gantz if he meets "basic demands" on the peace process, the Arab community's interests, and the Jewish nation-state law. President Rivlin met with party leaders on 22 September for the first day of talks. On 22 September 2019, the Joint List leader Ayman Odeh declared that the Joint List had agreed, by internal majority voting, to endorse Benny Gantz for prime minister, marking the first time an Arab-Israeli party had endorsed a Zionist for prime minister. Though initial reports suggested that the Joint List's recommendation gave Gantz a 57 to 55 edge, Rivlin revealed on 23 September that three Balad MKs—elected as part of the Joint List—demanded that their names be removed from a list of nominees of Gantz. After a day of confusion, Tibi and Odeh—leaders of the two pro-Gantz parties within Joint List—wrote a letter to Rivlin clarifying that the Joint List did not, in fact, have a unity agreement that legally binds individual parties to follow the party's nomination for the prime minister. As such, Balad's three MKs were legally allowed to ignore the Joint List's recommendation. As a result, Netanyahu leads Gantz in tallied recommendations by a 55 to 54 margin, with eight delegates from Yisrael Beiteinu and three delegates from Balad yet to recommend either. On 25 September, Rivlin selected Netanyahu to attempt to form the thirty-fifth government of Israel, but with the stipulation that if the attempt fails, Rivlin retains the mandate to nominate another candidate.

New members of Knesset were sworn in on 3 October 2019. The same day, talks between Netanyahu and Lieberman ended with no breakthrough. Moments after it was announced that Netanyahu was aiming to demonstrate Likud party unity with a leadership contest, the Israeli Prime Minister received a challenge from Gideon Sa'ar, who tersely tweeted, "I'm ready", should the Prime Minister agree to hold a leadership election. On 4 October, Netanyahu decided against holding a leadership election.

On 22 October, Netanyahu informed President Rivlin that he was unable to form a government. On 23 October, President Rivlin gave the mandate of forming a government to Gantz.

Gantz was then given 28 days to form a coalition to lead the government, but was unable and returned the mandate on 21 November. Following this, a period of 21 days began in which any Knesset member can lead the government if they submit 61 signatures to the president. Since no MK was able to form a government by 11 December, the Knesset again voted to dissolve itself, with new elections held on 2 March 2020.

== See also ==
- List of members of the twenty-second Knesset
- 2019 in Israel
- List of elections in 2019
