= List of members of the twenty-fourth Knesset =

List of current members of the Knesset

24th Knesset
←	23rd	25th	→

Overview
- Legislative body: Knesset
- Jurisdiction: Israel
- Meeting place: Knesset building
- Term: 7 April 2021 – 30 June 2022
- Election: 23 March 2021
- Government: 36th government

Knesset
- President: Reuven Rivlin; Isaac Herzog (Note: Herzog replaced Rivlin on 2 June 2021)
- Prime minister: Naftali Bennett (Note: Yair Lapid replaced Bennett to becomes prime minister when the Knesset dissolved on 30 June 2022)
- Speaker: Mickey Levy

The members of the 24th Knesset were elected on 23 March 2021 and held office until the Knesset's dissolution on 30 June 2022, which triggered snap elections held on 1 November 2022.

== Members of the Knesset ==
Faction	Party	Name
Likud (29)		Benjamin Netanyahu • Yuli Edelstein • Israel Katz • Miri Regev • Yariv Levin • Yoav Gallant • Nir Barkat • Gila Gamliel • Avi Dichter • Haim Katz • Eli Cohen • Galit Distel-Atbaryan • Tzachi Hanegbi • Ofir Akunis • Yuval Steinitz • Dudi Amsalem • Amir Ohana • Ofir Katz • Eti Atiya • Yoav Kisch • David Bitan • Keren Barak • Shlomo Karhi • Miki Zohar • Orly Levy-Abekasis • Keti Shitrit • Fateen Mulla • May Golan • Tali Ploskov
Yesh Atid (17)		Yair Lapid • Meir Cohen • Elazar Stern • Mickey Levy • Meirav Ben-Ari • Ram Ben-Barak • Yoav Segalovitz • Boaz Toporovsky • Yorai Lahav-Hertzanu • Vladimir Beliak • Ron Katz • Nira Shpak • Tania Mazarsky • Yasmin Fridman • Inbar Bezek • Moshe Tur-Paz • Simon Davidson
National Unity (15)	Blue and White (8)	Benny Gantz • Michael Biton • Alon Schuster • Eitan Ginzburg • Yael Ron Ben-Moshe • Ruth Wasserman Lande • Alon Tal • Mufid Mari
National Unity (15)	New Hope (5)	Yifat Shasha-Biton • Sharren Haskel • Benny Begin • Meir Yitzhak Halevi • Michel Buskila
National Unity (15)	Independents (2)	Matan Kahana • Shirly Pinto (Note: Both MKs left Yamina to join National Unity)
Shas (9)		Ya'akov Margi • Yoav Ben-Tzur • Michael Malchieli • Haim Biton • Moshe Arbel • Yinon Azulai • Moshe Abutbul • Uriel Buso • Yosef Taieb
Labor (7)		Merav Michaeli • Emilie Moatti • Gilad Kariv • Efrat Rayten • Ram Shefa • Ibtisam Mara'ana • Naama Lazimi
United Torah Judaism (7)	Degel HaTorah (4)	Moshe Gafni • Uri Maklev • Ya'akov Asher • Yitzhak Pindrus
United Torah Judaism (7)	Agudat Yisrael (3)	Meir Porush • Yisrael Eichler • Ya'akov Tessler
Yisrael Beiteinu (7)		Evgeny Sova • Yulia Malinovsky • Alex Kushnir • Elina Bardach-Yalov • Limor Magen Telem • Yossi Shain • Sharon Roffe Ofir
Religious Zionist Party (7)	Religious Zionist Party (4)	Bezalel Smotrich • Michal Waldiger • Simcha Rothman • Orit Strook
Religious Zionist Party (7)	Noam (1)	Avi Maoz
Religious Zionist Party (7)	Atid Ehad (1)	Ofir Sofer (Note: Sofer was elected on the Likud list using Atid Ehad as a shelf party. On 14 June 2021, after the swearing-in of the new government, he split from Likud and joined the Religious Zionist Party parliamentary group. The split was not officially approved until 27 June.)
Religious Zionist Party (7)	Otzma Yehudit (1)	Itamar Ben-Gvir
Joint List (6)	Hadash (3)	Ayman Odeh • Aida Touma-Suleiman • Ofer Cassif
Joint List (6)	Ta'al (2)	Ahmad Tibi • Osama Saadi
Joint List (6)	Balad (1)	Sami Abu Shehadeh
Meretz (6)		Yair Golan • Ghaida Rinawie Zoabi • Mossi Raz • Michal Rozin • Gaby Lasky • Ali Salalha
Yamina (4)	New Right	Nir Orbach • Naftali Bennett • Yomtob Kalfon • Orna Starkmann
Ra'am (4)		Mansour Abbas • Mazen Ghnaim • Walid Taha • Iman Khatib-Yasin
Economic Freedom (1)		Abir Kara
Derekh Eretz (1)		Zvi Hauser (Note: Derekh Eretz was a member of New Hope, but Hauser was not part of New Hope's agreement to join National Unity)

=== Replacements ===
Date	Replacement	Party	Replacing	Notes
5 April 2021	Idit Silman	Yamina	Alon Davidi	Davidi was third on the Yamina list, but opted not to take his place in the Knesset before members were sworn in
7 April 2021	Yosef Taieb	Shas	Aryeh Deri	Deri resigned from the Knesset under the Norwegian Law
7 April 2021	Ya'akov Tessler	United Torah Judaism	Yaakov Litzman	Litzman resigned from the Knesset under the Norwegian Law
7 April 2021	Eliyahu Baruchi	United Torah Judaism	Uri Maklev	Maklev resigned from the Knesset under the Norwegian Law
13 June 2021	Aryeh Deri	Shas	Yosef Taieb	After a new government was formed, Deri lost his ministerial post and returned to the Knesset
13 June 2021	Yaakov Litzman	United Torah Judaism	Ya'akov Tessler	After a new government was formed, Litzman lost his ministerial post and returned to the Knesset
13 June 2021	Uri Maklev	United Torah Judaism	Eliyahu Baruchi	After a new government was formed, Maklev lost his ministerial post and returned to the Knesset
15 June 2021	Zvi Hauser	New Hope	Yoaz Hendel	Hendel resigned from the Knesset under the Norwegian Law after being appointed to the cabinet
15 June 2021	Ruth Wasserman Lande	Blue and White	Orit Farkash-Hacohen	Farkash-Hacohen resigned from the Knesset under the Norwegian Law after being appointed to the cabinet
15 June 2021	Elina Bardach-Yalov	Yisrael Beiteinu	Avigdor Lieberman	Lieberman resigned from the Knesset under the Norwegian Law after being appointed to the cabinet
15 June 2021	Alon Tal	Blue and White	Pnina Tamano-Shata	Tamano-Shata resigned from the Knesset under the Norwegian Law after being appointed to the cabinet
15 June 2021	Meir Yitzhak Halevi	New Hope	Ze'ev Elkin	Elkin resigned from the Knesset under the Norwegian Law after being appointed to the cabinet
15 June 2021	Limor Magen Telem	Yisrael Beiteinu	Oded Forer	Forer resigned from the Knesset under the Norwegian Law after being appointed to the cabinet
15 June 2021	Tania Mazarsky	Yesh Atid	Yoel Razvozov	Razvozov resigned from the Knesset under the Norwegian Law after being appointed to the cabinet
15 June 2021	Mufid Mari	Blue and White	Hili Tropper	Tropper resigned from the Knesset under the Norwegian Law after being appointed to the cabinet
15 June 2021	Shirly Pinto	Yamina	Matan Kahana	Kahana resigned from the Knesset under the Norwegian Law after being appointed to the cabinet
15 June 2021	Yasmin Fridman	Yesh Atid	Orna Barbivai	Barbivai resigned from the Knesset under the Norwegian Law after being appointed to the cabinet
15 June 2021	Yossi Shain	Yisrael Beiteinu	Hamad Amar	Amar resigned from the Knesset under the Norwegian Law after being appointed to the cabinet
16 June 2021	Michal Rozin	Meretz	Nitzan Horowitz	Horowitz resigned from the Knesset under the Norwegian Law after being appointed to the cabinet
16 June 2021	Gaby Lasky	Meretz	Tamar Zandberg	Zandberg resigned from the Knesset under the Norwegian Law after being appointed to the cabinet
22 June 2021	Naama Lazimi	Labor	Omer Bar-Lev	Bar-Lev resigned from the Knesset under the Norwegian Law after being appointed to the cabinet
23 June 2021	Yomtob Kalfon	Yamina	Ayelet Shaked	Shaked resigned from the Knesset under the Norwegian Law after being appointed to the cabinet
27 June 2021	Inbar Bezek	Yesh Atid	Karine Elharrar	Elharrar resigned from the Knesset under the Norwegian Law after being appointed to the cabinet
9 July 2021	Michal Shir	New Hope	Gideon Sa'ar	Sa'ar resigned from the Knesset under the Norwegian Law after being appointed to the cabinet
9 July 2021	Moshe Tur-Paz	Yesh Atid	Meirav Cohen	Cohen resigned from the Knesset under the Norwegian Law after being appointed to the cabinet
9 July 2021	Simon Davidson	Yesh Atid	Idan Roll	Roll resigned from the Knesset under the Norwegian Law after being appointed to the cabinet
18 July 2021	Ali Salalha	Meretz	Issawi Frej	Frej resigned from the Knesset under the Norwegian Law after being appointed to the cabinet
3 August 2021	Sharon Roffe Ofir	Yisrael Beiteinu	Eli Avidar	Avidar resigned from the Knesset under the Norwegian Law after being appointed to the cabinet
25 August 2021	Iman Khatib-Yasin	United Arab List	Said al-Harumi	Al-Harumi died on 25 August 2021.
25 January 2022	Yosef Taieb	Shas	Aryeh Deri	Deri resigned from the Knesset as part of a plea bargain in a trial for tax offences
24 February 2022	Eli Avidar	Yisrael Beiteinu	Sharon Roffe Ofir	Avidar returned to the Knesset after resigning from the cabinet
15 May 2022	Matan Kahana	Yamina	Yomtob Kalfon	Kahana returned to the Knesset after resigning from the cabinet
3 June 2022	Ya'akov Tessler	United Torah Judaism	Yaakov Litzman	Litzman resigned from the Knesset as part of a plea bargain
14 July 2022	Yomtob Kalfon	Yamina	Amichai Chikli	Chikli resigned from the Knesset in order to run on the Likud list in the 2022 Israeli legislative election
2 August 2022	Michel Buskila	New Hope	Michal Shir	Shir resigned from the Knesset in order to run on the Yesh Atid list in the 2022 Israeli legislative election
4 August 2022	Tali Ploskov	Likud	Gadi Yevarkan	Yevarkan resigned from the Knesset in order to run for the new immigrant slot in the 2022 Likud primaries
17 August 2022	Sharon Roffe Ofir	Yisrael Beiteinu	Eli Avidar	Avidar resigned from the Knesset in order to run separately in the 2022 Israeli legislative election
13 September 2022	Orna Starkmann	Yamina	Idit Silman	Silman resigned from the Knesset in order to run on the Likud list in the 2022 Israeli legislative election

== See also ==
- Thirty-sixth government of Israel
- Party lists for the 2021 Israeli legislative election
