= Sharon Roffe Ofir =

Israeli politician

- שרון רופא אופיר
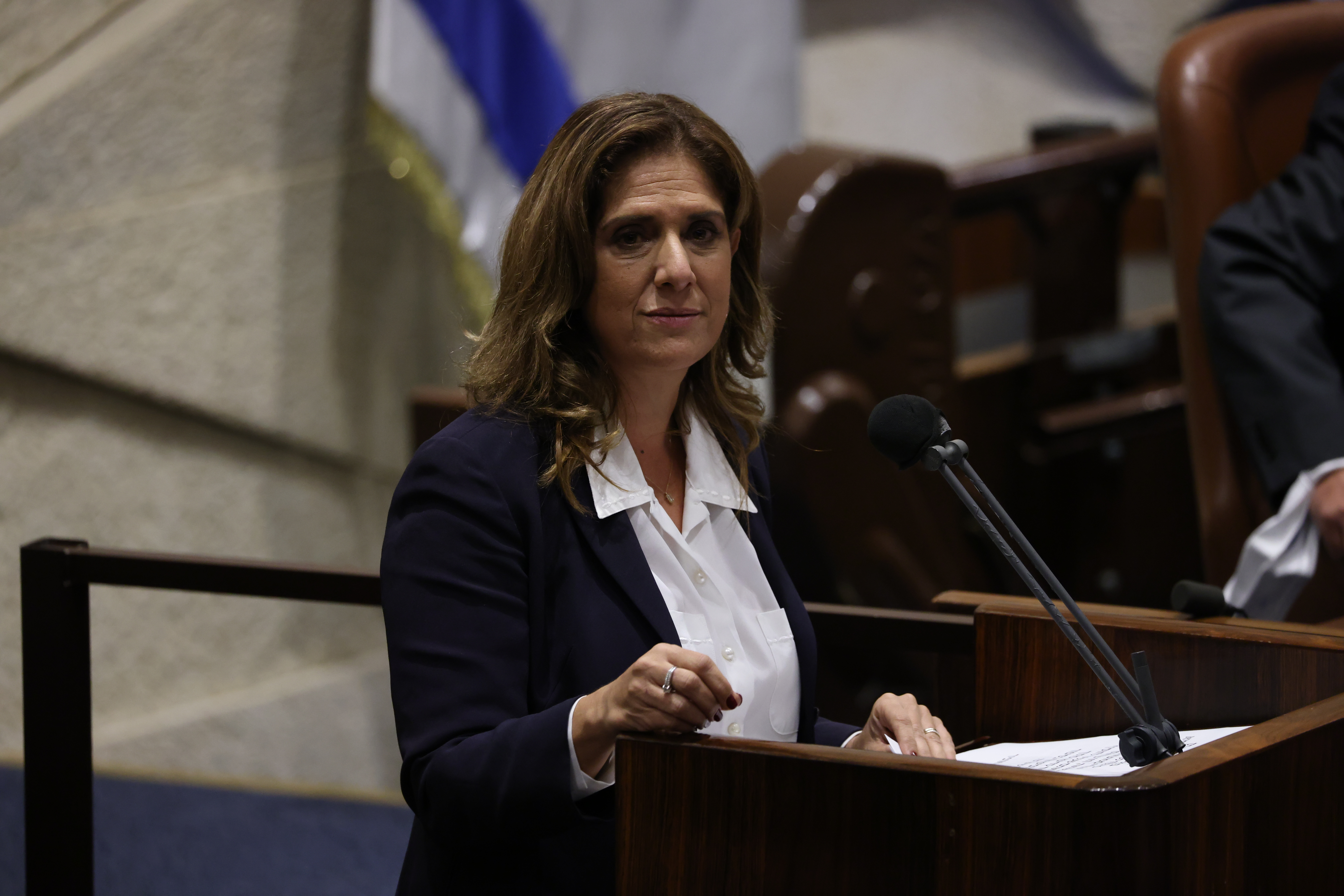

Faction represented in the Knesset
- 2021–2022: Yisrael Beiteinu
- 2022: Yisrael Beiteinu

Personal details
- Born: 16 December 1970 (age 54); Kiryat Tivon, Israel

Sharon Roffe Ofir (Hebrew: שרון רופא אופיר; born 16 December 1970) is an Israeli journalist and politician. She served as a member of the Knesset for Yisrael Beiteinu in 2022, a position she previously held from 2021 to 2022. Roffe Ofir was also a deputy mayor of Kiryat Tiv'on.

== Biography ==
Roffe Ofir was born in Kiryat Tiv'on to Yosef, a descendant of the Old Yishuv and Tamar, of Iranian Jewish descent. She attended the local Ort High School and completed her mandatory military service in the Southern Command Operations Room.

Roffe Ofir completed a bachelor's degree in sociology and anthropology with an extension in law at the University of Haifa, later completing a master's degree in communications with a specialization in journalism at the same university. In 2000 she began working as a lecturer in media and a reporter for the Yedioth Ahronoth group, until 2010 on the Ynet website, and from then until 2021 for its women's magazine. For her activities in Ynet, she won the "Journalist of the Decade" award from the Haifa and North Journalists' Association. Following the coverage of the Murder of Tair Rada from 2006 onwards, she published the book "Tair: Ilana Rada's Journey" in 2018.

Following the 2018 municipal elections, Roffe Ofir was appointed deputy mayor of Kiryat Tiv'on after unsuccessfully running for mayor. In the 2020 Knesset elections, she was placed second on the "Women's Voice" list, which failed to cross the electoral threshold. In the March 2021 Knesset elections she was placed eleventh on the Yisrael Beiteinu list and headed the party's women's platform. Although the party won only seven seats and she initially missed out, Roffe Ofir entered the Knesset on 5 August 2021 as a replacement for Eli Avidar, who gave up his seat after being appointed to the cabinet under the Norwegian Law. When Avidar resigned from his ministerial role in February 2022 he returned to the Knesset and replaced Roffe Ofir. Avidar resigned in August 2022, with Ofir taking his place as an MK.

== Personal life ==
Roffe Ofir is married to Ran Ofir, a police officer. The couple live in Kiryat Tivon and have three children.
