= Russian Jews in Israel =

יהודי רוסיה בישראל (Hebrew)

Total population
- 1,037,000 (all ex-Soviet, 1999)

Regions with significant populations
- Jerusalem, Tel Aviv, Haifa, and many other areas

Languages
- Hebrew, Russian

Religion
- mostly secular

Related ethnic groups
- Russian Jews, Russians in Israel

Russian Jews in Israel are immigrants and descendants of the immigrants of the Russian Jewish communities who now reside within the State of Israel. In 1999, the Israeli Jewish population born in the former Soviet Union, including their children, numbered 1,037,000.

== Immigration history ==
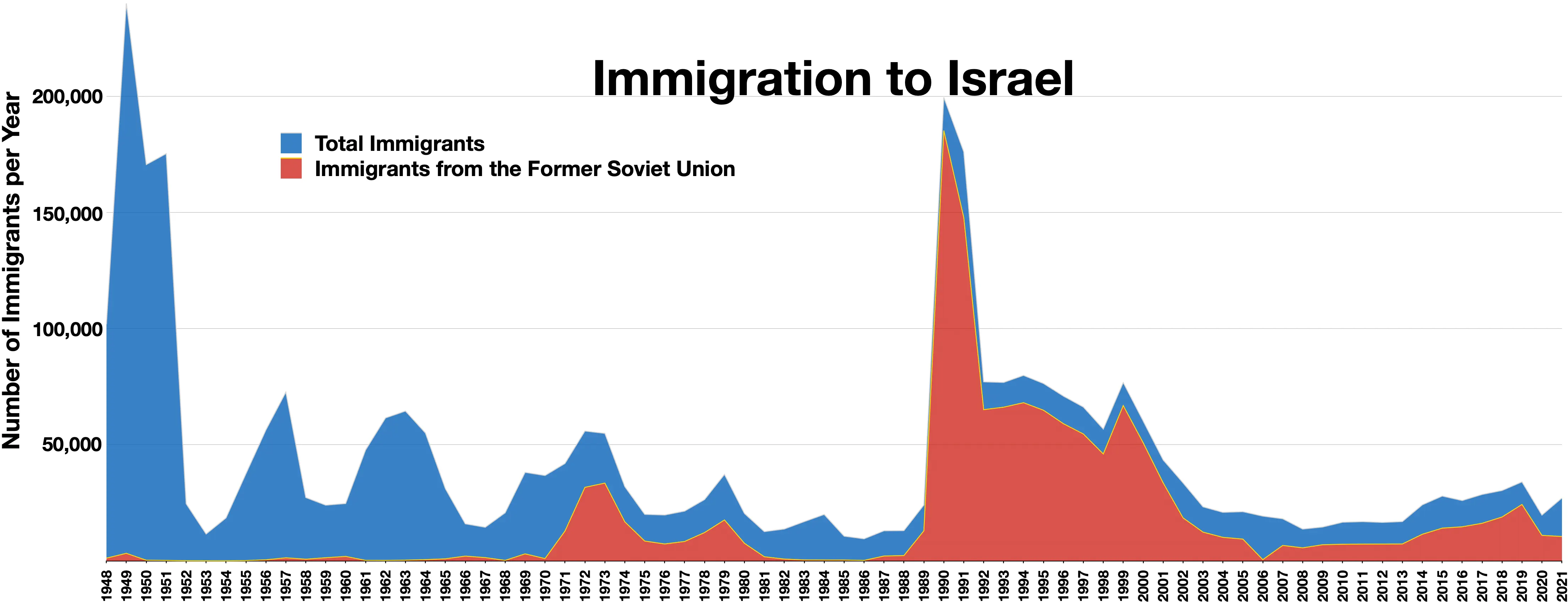
Immigration to Israel Total Immigrants Immigrants from the USSR and Post-Soviet states

The largest number of Russian Jews now live in Israel. Israel is home to a core Russian-Jewish population of 900,000, and an enlarged population of 1,544,000 (including halakhically non-Jewish members of Jewish households, but excluding those who reside in Israel illegally). The Aliyah in the 1990s accounts for 85–90% of this population.

The population growth rate for Former Soviet Union (FSU) immigrants were among the lowest for any Israeli groups, with a fertility rate of 1.70 and natural increase of just +0.5% per year. The increase in Jewish birth rate in Israel during the 2000–2007 period was partly due to the increasing birth rate among the FSU immigrants, who now form 20% of the Jewish population of Israel. 96.5% of the enlarged Russian Jewish population in Israel is either Jewish or non-religious, while 3.5% (35,000) belongs to other religions (mostly Christians) and about 10,000 so-called "messianic Jews".

Year	TFR
2000	1.544
1999	1.612
1998	1.632
1997	1.723
1996	1.743
1995	1.731
1994	1.756
1993	1.707
1992	1.604
1991	1.398
1990	1.390

The Total Fertility Rate for FSU immigrants in Israel is given in the table below. The TFR increased with time, peaking in 1997, then slightly decreased after that, and then again increased after 2000.

In 1999, about 1,037,000 FSU immigrants lived in Israel, of whom about 738,900 immigrated after 1989. The second largest ethnic group (Moroccans) numbered just 1,000,000. From 2000–2006, 142,638 FSU immigrants moved to Israel. While 70,000 of them emigrated from Israel to countries like the U.S. and Canada, bringing the total population to 1,150,000 by 2007 January (excluding illegal immigrants). The natural increase was around 0.3% in late 1990s. For example 2,456 in 1996 (7,463 births to 5,007 deaths), 2,819 in 1997 (8,214 to 5,395), 2,959 in 1998 (8,926 to 5,967) and 2,970 in 1999 (9,282 to 6,312). In 1999, the natural growth was +0.385%. (Figures only for FSU immigrants moved in after 1989).

An estimated 45,000 illegal immigrants from the Former Soviet Union lived in Israel during the end of 2010, but it is not clear how many of them are actually Jews.

Currently, Russia has the highest rate of aliyah to Israel among any other country. In 2013, 7,520 people, nearly 40% of all olim, immigrated to Israel from the former Soviet Union.

As of 2018, USSR Jews are estimated to be 12.4% of the Israeli population.

== Political history ==
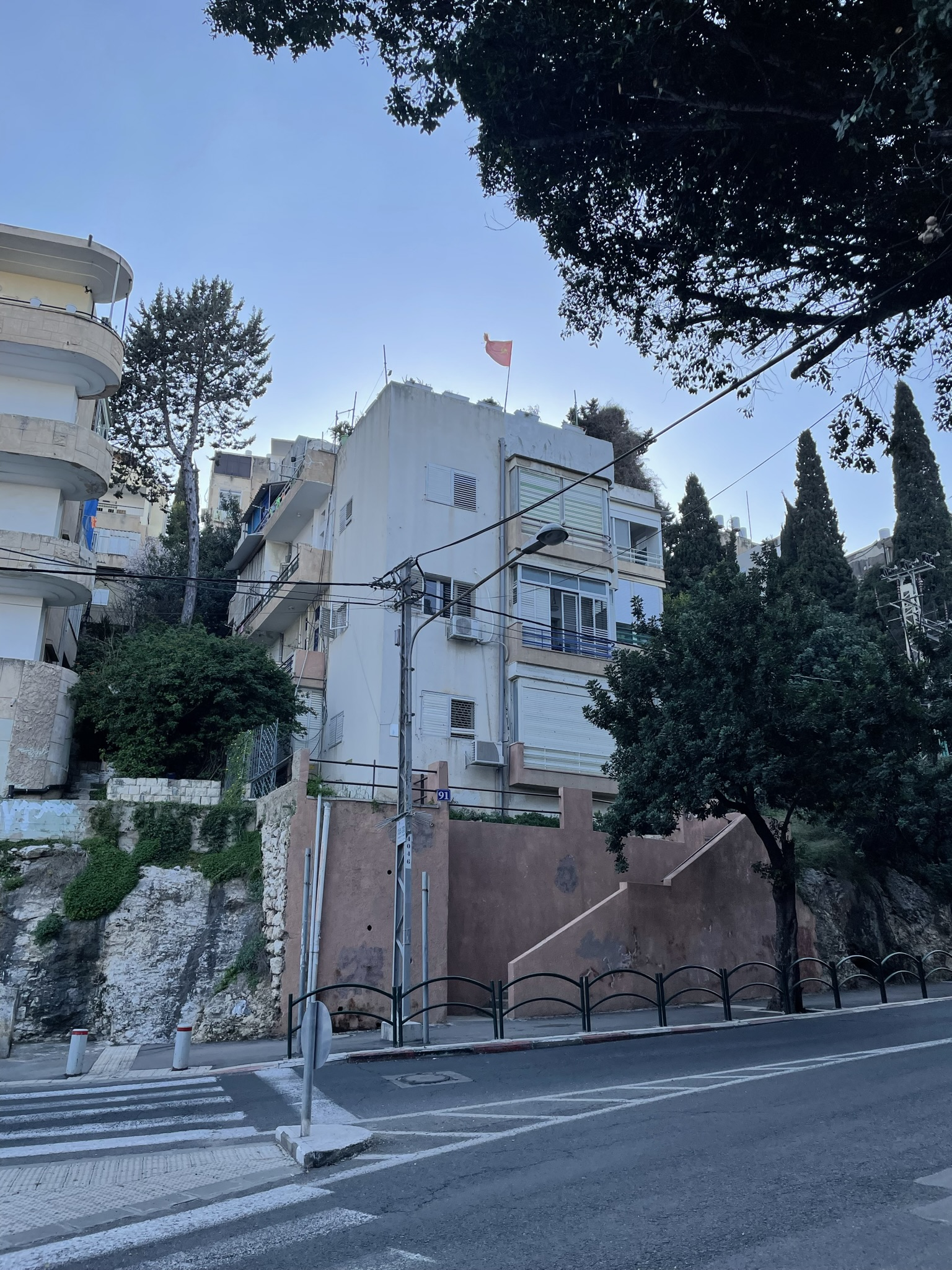
Soviet flag on a building in Hadar HaCarmel, a Haifa district known for its large Russian Jewish population

Russian Jews have been very dominant in Israeli politics, due to large number of Russian Jews occupied in the official positions of Israeli Government. Former Israeli Foreign Minister, Avigdor Lieberman, was born in former Soviet Union's Moldova. Many Russian Jews maintain their ties with Russia, and play an important role in the relationship between Russia and Israel.

== Demographics ==
=== Mixed families ===
As of 2003, approximately 300,000 halakhically non-Jewish members of Jewish households lived in Israel.

== Notable people ==
- Natan Sharansky
- Yuri Foreman
- Yuri Stern
- Yuli Edelstein
- Yoel Razvozov
- Vladimir Beliak
- Evgeny Sova
- Alex Kushnir
- Elina Bardach-Yalov
- Tania Mazarsky
- Yulia Malinovsky
- Nachman Dushanski
- Boris Gelfand
- Alexander Goldstein
- Natasha Mozgovaya
- Avigdor Lieberman
- Anastassia Michaeli
- Haim Megrelashvili
- Victor Mikhalevski
- Evgeny Postny
- Maxim Rodshtein
- Tatiana Zatulovskaya
- Maria Gorokhovskaya
- Katia Pisetsky
- Aleksandr Averbukh
- Anna Smashnova
- Jan Talesnikov
- Vadim Alexeev
- Michael Kolganov
- Alexander Danilov
- Evgenia Linetskaya
- Marina Kravchenko
- David Kazhdan
- Leonid Nevzlin
- Vadim Akolzin
- Roman Bronfman
- Michael Cherney
- Victoria Veinberg Filanovsky
- Sergei Sakhnovski
- Roman Zaretski
- Alexandra Zaretski
- Larisa Trembovler
- Boris Tsirelson
- Daniel Samohin
- Margarita Levieva
- Anna Zak
- Diana Golbi
- Arkadi Duchin
- Arcadi Gaydamak
- Neta Rivkin
- Artem Dolgopyat
- Eliezer Sherbatov
- Dina Rubina

== See also ==
- Aliyah
- Refusenik
- 1970s Soviet Union aliyah
- 1990s Post-Soviet aliyah
- Russian language in Israel
- History of the Jews in Russia
- Jewish ethnic divisions
- Israel–Russia relations
- Russians in Israel
