= Yomtob Kalfon =

Israeli politician

- יום טוב כלפון
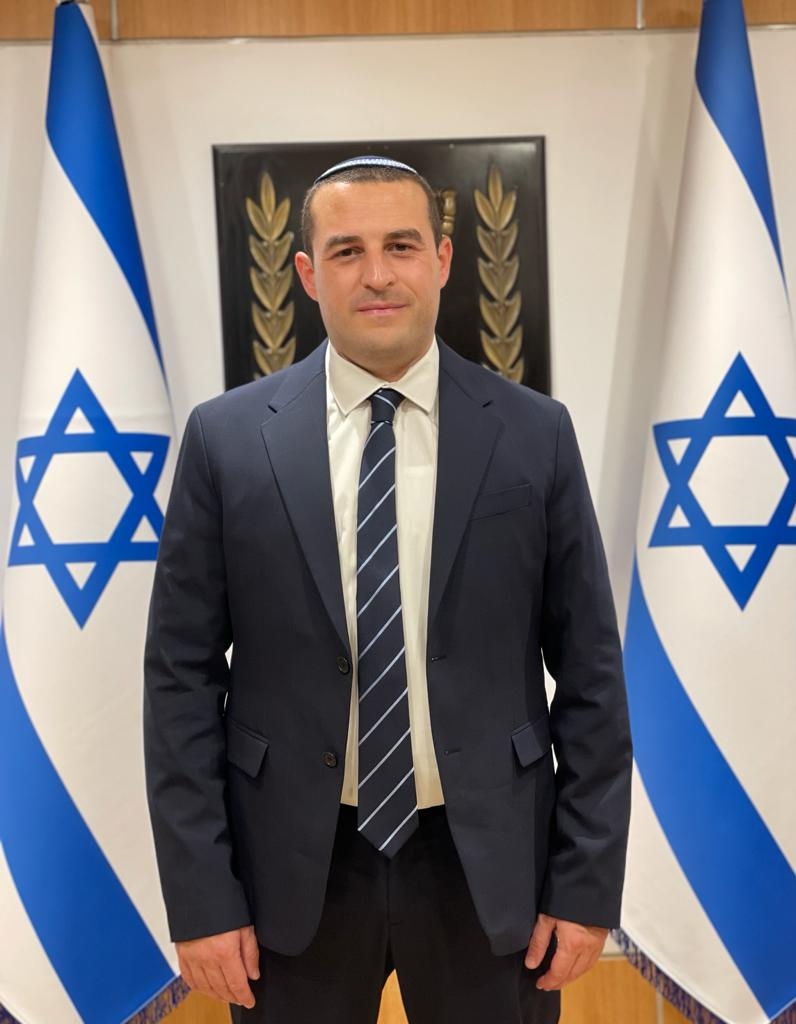

Faction represented in the Knesset
- 2021–2022: Yamina
- 2022: Yamina

Personal details
- Born: 16 June 1986 (age 39) Sarcelles, France

Yomtob Tovchai Kalfon (Hebrew: יום טוב כלפון) is an Israeli attorney and politician who served as a member of the Knesset for Yamina.

Kalfon, a native of France, immigrated to Israel in 2004 to serve in the IDF. He studied for a master's degree in political science and political communication at the Hebrew University, and also studied parliamentary counseling at the Israeli Center for Political Training.

== Early life ==
Kalfon was born in France and made aliyah in 2004. He is the grandson of Yomtob Kalfon, who was the spiritual leader of the Keren Yéchoua synagogue in La Marsa.

== Political career ==
He was placed twelfth on the New Right's electoral list ahead of the April 2019 elections, but failed to win a seat. He was an unsuccessful candidate again in September 2019 (17th on the Yamina list), March 2020 (seventeenth on the Yamina list) and March 2021 (eleventh on the Yamina list). However, after Yamina MK Ayelet Shaked resigned from the Knesset under the Norwegian Law in June 2021 following her appointment as Minister of the Interior, Kalfon entered the Knesset as her replacement.

On 13 May 2022, Minister of Religious Services Matan Kahana announced his resignation as minister, a move that would end Kalfon's tenure as a Member of Knesset on 15 May. The move was meant to “help strengthen the coalition” after Kalfon was suspected of being prepared to leave the shaky coalition. Kalfon returned to the Knesset in July 2022 following the resignation of Amichai Chikli.

== Personal life ==
Kalfon is married and has 3 children. He lives in Beit Raban.
