= Yosef Taieb =

Israeli rabbi and politician

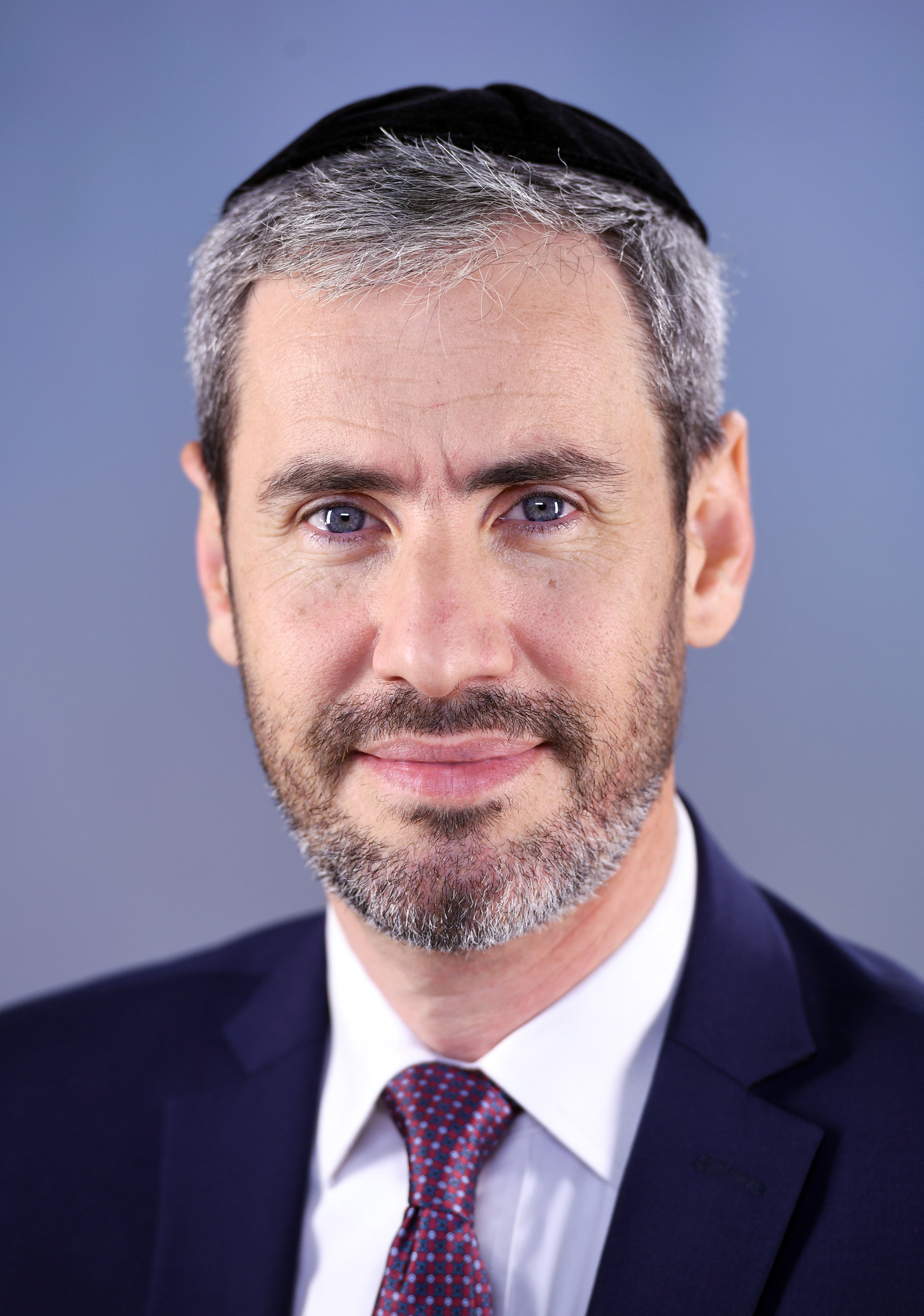
- Taieb in 2021

Faction represented in the Knesset
- 2020–2021: Shas
- 2021: Shas
- 2022–: Shas

Personal details
- Born: 15 February 1981 (age 45) Paris, France

Yosef Taieb (Hebrew: יוֹסֵף טָיֶיבּ; born 15 February 1981) is an Israeli politician. He is currently a member of the Knesset for Shas.

== Biography ==
Taieb was born in the 15th arrondissement of Paris to parents of Tunisian Jewish descent. He emigrated to Israel at the age of 17 to study in the Mir Yeshiva in Jerusalem. During his national service in the Israel Defence Forces, he served in the Givati Brigade. Between 2006 and 2008 he worked in Toulouse as a community rabbi. After returning to Israel, he managed projects for French immigrants run by the Wolfson Foundation from 2009 to 2020.

Taieb was elected to the municipal council of Kiryat Ye'arim. In 2018 he became deputy mayor of the council. He was placed fifteenth on the Shas list for the April 2019 elections, but the party won only eight seats. He was placed twelfth for the September 2019 elections, in which Shas won nine seats. Although he missed out again in the March 2020 elections in which he was placed eleventh and Shas again won nine seats, he entered the Knesset on 1 July 2020 as a replacement for Yoav Ben-Tzur, who had resigned his seat under the Norwegian Law after being appointed to the cabinet. Placed tenth on the Shas list for the March 2021 elections, he lost his seat as the party won nine seats. He regained his seat when Aryeh Deri resigned his own seat under the Norwegian Law; he left the Knesset again when Deri returned to the legislature after losing his ministerial position. When Deri resigned from the Knesset in January 2022, Taieb returned for a third spell.

Ahead of the formation of the thirty-seventh government of Israel, Taieb was selected to head the Knesset Committee on Education, Culture and Sports. He resigned from his chairmanship in October 2025.

Taieb was not expected to enter the Knesset following the 2026 Israeli legislative election, but became an incoming member after various resignations.
