= New Right (Israel) =

Political party in Israel

New Right הימין החדש
- Leader: Naftali Bennett
- Founded: 29 December 2018
- Dissolved: c. November 2022 (de facto)
- Split from: The Jewish Home
- Preceded by: Tzalash (legally)
- Ideology: Zionism; National conservatism Economic liberalism Judicial restraint Factions: Religious Zionism; Secularism
- Political position: Right-wing to far-right
- National affiliation: Yamina (2019; 2020–2022); The Jewish Home (2022)
- Slogan: Right Wing. Responsibly.
- Most MKs: 7 (2021)

Election symbol
- נ

Website
- newyamin.org

The New Right (Hebrew: הימין החדש, HaYamin HeHadash) was a right-wing to far-right political party in Israel, established in December 2018 by Ayelet Shaked and Naftali Bennett. The New Right aimed to be a right-wing party open to both religious and secular people. The party did not win any seats in the April 2019 election, though it won three seats in the subsequent election of September 2019, retained these in the March 2020 election and increased to seven seats in the 2021 Israeli legislative election.

== History ==
Tzalash, an inactive party, was purchased as a shelf party in August 2018 by a Naftali Bennett associate named Amichai Weinberger.

The new party was formed in December 2018, when Bennett, Ayelet Shaked, and Shuli Mualem left the Jewish Home. The party's legal name remains Tzalash, though it was restyled as an abbreviation for Tzion LeShevah (an IDF citation), rather than the previous Tziyonut Liberaliyut Shivyon (Zionism, Liberalism, Equality) of the original Tzalash but Tziyonut Liberaliyut Shivyon is still the legal name of the party. Among the reasons given for the split was the purely religious nature of the Jewish Home.

On 2 January 2019, it was announced that Caroline Glick, a columnist at The Jerusalem Post, had joined the party. Deaf rights activist Shirly Pinto joined the party on 8 January 2019; Shaked stated that Pinto would be an "effective advocate for the rights of people with disabilities". In the September 2019 election, it joined the Yamina alliance, alongside the Jewish Home and Tkuma. The alliance officially split into two factions (the New Right, and the Jewish Home/Tkuma) on 10 October. The New Right also unsuccessfully attempted to negotiate an alliance with Zehut. On 8 November, Prime Minister Benjamin Netanyahu announced that the New Right would be merging with his ruling Likud party, though Shaked rebutted the idea the next day.

Prior to the 2020 Israeli legislative election, the New Right entered talks with the New Liberal Party for an electoral alliance. Bennett subsequently approached Zehut leader Moshe Feiglin for an alliance, although Feiglin declined the offer. On 14 January 2020, the New Right announced it had formed an electoral alliance with Tkuma. The party reformed the Yamina alliance on 15 January, with The Jewish Home and Tkuma again joining. Bennett rejected the prospect of expanding the alliance to include Otzma Yehudit, despite pressure from Netanyahu. On 22 April, it was reported that Bennett was now "considering all options" for Yamina's political future, including departing from Netanyahu's government, which had just agreed to form a joint government with leader of the opposition Blue and White party Benny Gantz, and joining the opposition. Bennett was said to be unhappy with the new coalition government's decision to hold back on the issue of judicial reform. On 14 May, The Jewish Home's only Knesset member, Rafi Peretz ended his status as a member of Yamina, and agreed to join Netanyahu's new government as well. On 15 May, the New Right, along with Tkuma, split with Netanyahu and made the Yamina alliance a member of the opposition. On 17 May, Bennett met with Gantz, who also succeeded him as defence minister, and declared that both Yamina parties were now "head held high" members of the opposition.

On 9 May 2021, it was reported that Bennett and Yesh Atid leader Yair Lapid had made major headway in the coalition talks for forming a new Israeli government. On 30 May, going against their constituents' will, all but one Yamina MK agreed to back joining a coalition government with Lapid.

Yamina and the Jewish Home agreed to run on a joint list in September 2022 ahead of the 2022 Israeli legislative election. However, the party did not make it past the electoral threshold.

In November 2022, after the party failed to win any seats in the election, both Naftali Bennett and Ayelet Shaked decided to retire from politics, leaving the party effectively dissolved.

== Platform ==
The New Right platform, as detailed by its website, was:

- Promotion of cooperation between religious and secular Jews.
- The Land of Israel belongs to the Jewish people.
- Opposition to the establishment of a Palestinian state.
- Belief in economic liberalism.
- Belief in personal freedom and personal responsibility.
- Israel is the nation-state of the Jewish people, and only of the Jewish people.
- Full civil rights for minorities.
- Promotion of the Jewish tradition and the Jewish character of the state, without coercion.
- Opposition to Judicial activism.
- Promotion of the high-tech industry through a laissez-faire approach.
- Resistance to unnecessary regulation.
- The state should care for those who can not take care of themselves, while those who are able to work must work.

Ayelet Shaked said the party would work to arrange religious and secular relations on the basis of mutual understanding and an updated version of the Gavison-Medan Covenant.

== Leaders ==
Leader	Took office	Left office
Naftali Bennett	2018	2022

== Knesset members ==
Year	Members	Total
2018	Naftali Bennett, Ayelet Shaked, Shuli Mualem	3
2019–2020	Ayelet Shaked, Naftali Bennett, Matan Kahana	3
2020–2021	Naftali Bennett, Ayelet Shaked, Matan Kahana	3
2021–2022	Naftali Bennett, Ayelet Shaked, Matan Kahana, Amichai Chikli (Note: Defected to Likud during term and was replaced by Yomtob Kalfon), Nir Orbach, Abir Kara (Note: Left Yamina during term to form his own Economic Freedom party), Idit Silman (Note: Defected to Likud during term and was replaced by Orna Starkmann)	7

== Knesset election results ==
Election	Leader	Votes	%	Seats	+/–	Status
April 2019	Naftali Bennett	138,598	3.22%	0 / 120	▼3	Extraparliamentary
September 2019	Ayelet Shaked (lead candidate)	As part of Yamina		3 / 120	▲3	Snap election
2020	Naftali Bennett	As part of Yamina		3 / 120	0	Opposition
2021	Naftali Bennett	273,836	6.21%	7 / 120	▲4	Coalition
2022	Ayelet Shaked (lead candidate)	As part of The Jewish Home		0 / 120	▼7	Extraparliamentary

== See also ==
- Bennett 2026
