= Matan Kahana =

Israeli military officer and politician

- מתן כהנא
- Kahana in 2019

Speaker of the Knesset
- Incumbent
- Assumed office 17 November 2026
- Preceded by: Amir Ohana

Ministerial roles
- 2021–2022: Minister of Religious Services
- 2022: Deputy Minister of Religious Services

Faction represented in the Knesset
- 2019: Yamina
- 2019–2020: New Right
- 2020–2021: Yamina
- 2022: Yamina
- 2022–2025: National Unity
- 2026–: Yashar

Personal details
- Born: 29 July 1972 (age 54) Haifa, Israel
- Party: Yashar (since 2025)
- Spouse: Lisa Kahana
- Children: 4
- Education: Bar-Ilan University
- Awards: Movement for Quality Government in Israel (2022)

Matan Kahana (Hebrew: מתן כהנא; born 29 July 1972) is an Israeli politician and retired IDF colonel who has served as Speaker of the Knesset since November 2026. He represents the Yashar party in the Knesset, having previously served as an MK for the New Right, Yamina, and National Unity, and as Minister of Religious Services from 2021 to 2022.

During his 25-year military career, Kahana served as a special forces combat soldier in Sayeret Matkal before becoming a fighter pilot in the Israeli Air Force, eventually commanding an F-16 squadron. He then entered politics and was elected to the Knesset in 2019. He resigned his seat in 2025 before joining Gadi Eisenkot's Yashar party and returning to the Knesset in 2026.

== Biography ==
Kahana was born in Haifa to Elia and Ora Cahana.

When he was three months old, he moved with his family to New York following his father's electrical engineering and business administration studies. When he was three, the family returned to live in Moshav Beit Gamliel. Kahana attended elementary school at Kibbutz Hafetz Haim (grades 1-8), and then at the Netiv Meir Yeshiva. In his youth, he was a counselor in the Bnei Akiva movement, in the branch in Moshav Beit Gamliel.

He graduated with a BA in Law at Bar-Ilan University.

Kahana is married to Lisa, a Doctor of Clinical Psychology, and is the father of four children. He lives in the religious moshav Beit Gamliel.

== Military career ==
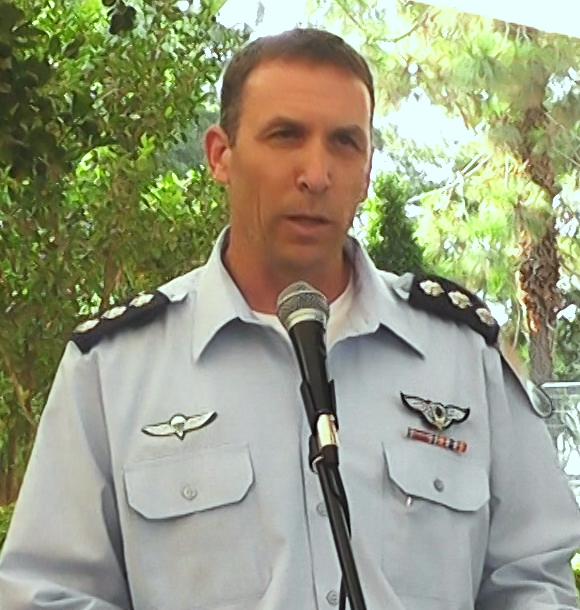
Kahana in 2017

Kahana was accepted to the Israeli Air Force Flight Academy and to the naval commando (Shayetet 13), but signed a waiver to serve in Sayeret Matkal. He served as a combat soldier for three and a half years, and was in the same team with Naftali Bennett and Emmanuel Moreno. In January 1994, when he finished his mandatory service, he joined the IAF Flight Academy and graduated a fighter pilot. He served as a fighter pilot in 116 Squadron.

Throughout his service, he participated as a pilot in the Gaza War (2008–2009), the 2012 Gaza War, and the 2014 Gaza War. He also participated as an F-16 pilot in the 2006 Lebanon War.

Upon completion of his position as commander of the Valley Squadron, he was promoted to the rank of lieutenant colonel and appointed the head of the division at the Air Force headquarters. In August 2018, he retired from the IDF after 25 years of service.

== Political career ==
After his release from the IDF in 2018, Kahana served as director of the Diaspora Initiative at the Center for Educational Technology.

On 10 January 2019, he announced that he was joining the New Right party, led by Naftali Bennett and Ayelet Shaked. He placed fourth on the Knesset party list for the April 2019 Knesset elections, but was not elected to the Knesset after his party narrowly failed to pass the election threshold.

Ahead of the September 2019 elections, he was listed seventh on the Yamina joint party list (on behalf of the New Right). The list won seven seats, and he was elected to the 22nd Knesset.

In May 2022, he resigned from his post of the Religious Services Minister and stated he would return to the Knesset to serve as a Yamina MK, replacing MK Yomtob Kalfon. The move was meant to “help strengthen the coalition.” Following his resignation, Kahana was quickly made the Deputy Religious Services Minister while the coalition government attempted to have him appointed back to his former post through a vote in the Knesset. This was however scuttled by rebel Yamina MK Idit Silman, who voted with the opposition.

In August 2022, Kahana decided to leave Yamina for the National Unity alliance. Kahana's term as the Deputy Religious Services Minister came to an end on 16 August, when the legal mandate for Bennett, who was serving as the acting minister of the department, came to an end after three months.

The party announced on 1 July 2025 that Kahana would leave the party and resign his seat in the Knesset. Kahana confirmed the same day that he is "in touch" with Bennett.

He left the Knesset in July 2025 and was replaced by Yael Ron Ben-Moshe.

Kahana joined Gadi Eisenkot's new party, Yashar, in September 2025. He was placed fifth in the party's list and elected to the Knesset after the 2026 Israeli legislative election.

Knesset Speaker Amir Ohana announced on 10 November that a vote to replace him would be held on 17 November after 67 MKs signed a motion. The heads of the Zionist opposition parties (Yashar, Together, The Democrats and Yisrael Beitenu) agreed to nominate Kahana, with the Joint List signaling its support for the move. He was elected speaker on 17 November. The appointment allows Kahana to set the parliamentary agenda.

Political offices
Preceded by Amir Ohana	Speaker of the Knesset; 2026–present	Incumbent
