= Yoav Ben-Tzur =

Israeli politician and rabbi

- יואב בן צור
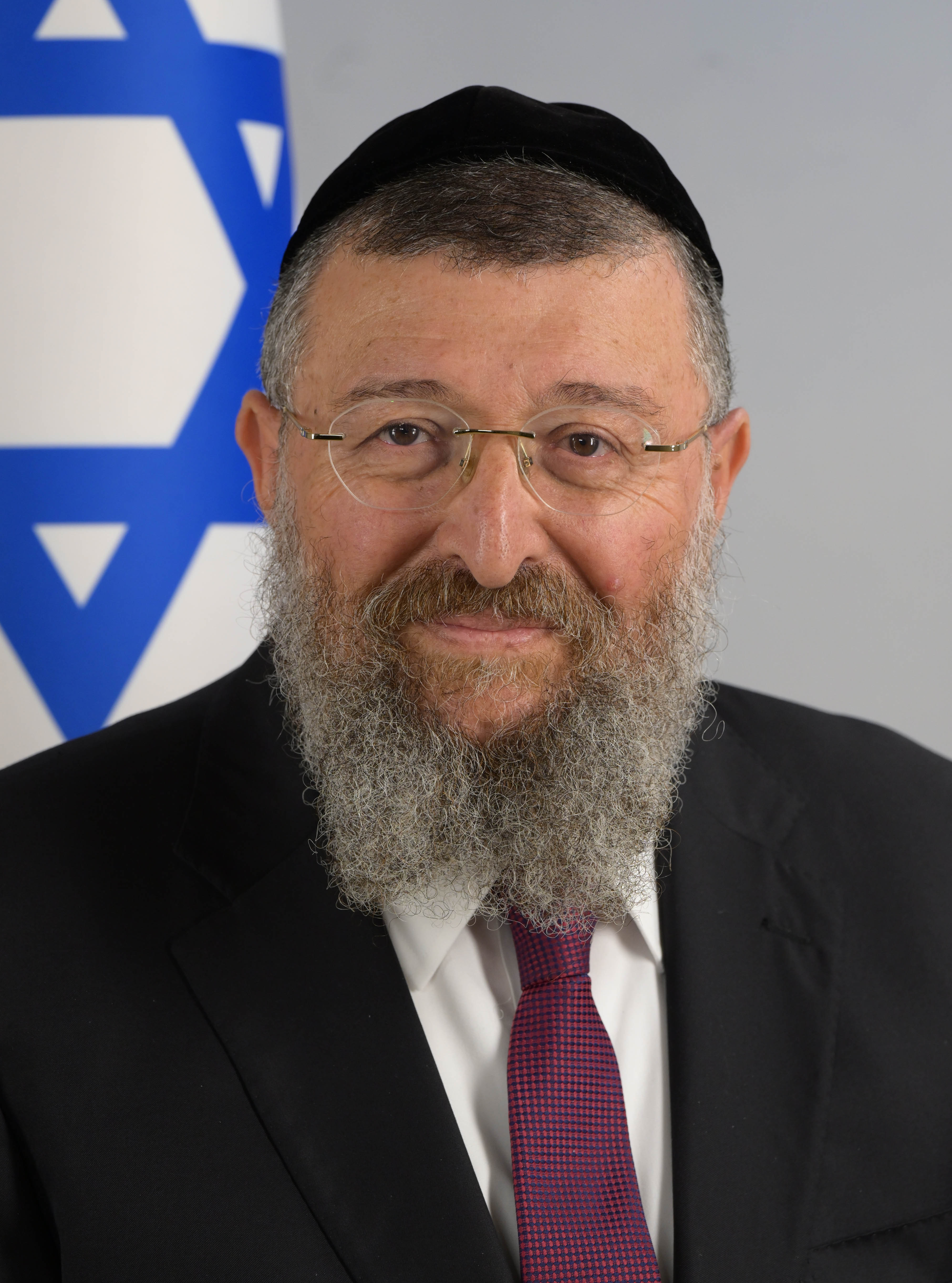
- Official portrait, 2023

Ministerial roles
- 2022–2025: Minister in the Ministry of Labor
- 2023: Minister of Health

Faction represented in the Knesset
- 2014–2020: Shas
- 2021–2023: Shas
- 2025–: Shas

Personal details
- Born: 11 June 1958 (age 68) Kfar Saba, Israel
- Spouse: Ofra
- Children: 7
- Education: Touro University; University of Manchester

Rabbi Yoav Ben-Tzur (Hebrew: יואב בן צור; born 11 June 1958) is an Israeli politician who currently serves as a member of the Knesset for Shas. Ben-Tzur previously served as the acting Minister of Health between January and April 2023 and as a minister in the Ministry of Labor from 2022 until 2025.

== Biography ==
Born in Kfar Saba, Ben-Tzur attended school in Netanya, and the Or Yisrael yeshiva in Petah Tikva.

His parents, Shalom and Mazal Sa'ada Ben-Tzur, immigrated to Israel from Yemen in the late 1940s. His brother is Rabbi Tzvieli Ben-Tzur, a lecturer for the Arachim organization, and his second cousin is Meir Yitzhak Halevy, a former Knesset member and former mayor of Eilat. The family lives in the Har Nof neighborhood of Jerusalem.

During his military service in the IDF, he served in the Soldier Teachers unit. He later became a reserve captain in the Nahal Brigade. Between 1985 and 1992, he worked at the Or Hadash middle boarding school. In 1993, he became Immigration Co-Ordinator in the Northern District for the Ministry of Religious Affairs. The following year, he took up the position of Deputy Director General of the National Centre for the Development of Holy Places, where he worked between 1994 and 1997. He then became CEO of HaMeshakem in 1998, serving until 2008. In 2001, he became chairman of the Jerusalem Religious Council, a position he held until the following year. He later worked as director-general of Shas' Ma'ayan HaChinuch HaTorani school system from 2007 until 2013.

In December 2007, Ben-Tzur was arrested on suspicion of bribery, fraud, and falsifying corporate records during his tenure as CEO of HaMeshakem; the case was later closed due to lack of evidence. A 2006 state comptroller's report had found that his salary as CEO exceeded the maximum permitted for a government company director.

A member of Shas, Ben-Tzur was placed twelfth on the Shas list for the 2013 Knesset elections, but failed to win a seat, as Shas won eleven seats. However, he entered the Knesset on 22 June 2014 as a replacement for Ariel Atias, who resigned in order to take a break from politics. He was re-elected in 2015, April 2019, 2019 and 2020. In May 2020 he was appointed Deputy Minister of the Development of the Periphery, Negev, and Galilee and Deputy Minister of the Interior. He subsequently resigned from the Knesset and was replaced by Yosef Taieb. He was re-elected to the Knesset in the March 2021 elections.

Ben-Tzur was appointed as minister in the Ministry of Labor in December 2022 and resigned from the position in the cabinet in July 2025.

Ben-Tzur has a master's degree in Business and Public Administration from the University of Manchester. He is married with seven children, and lives in Jerusalem.
