= Simon Davidson =

Israeli politician

- סימון דוידסון
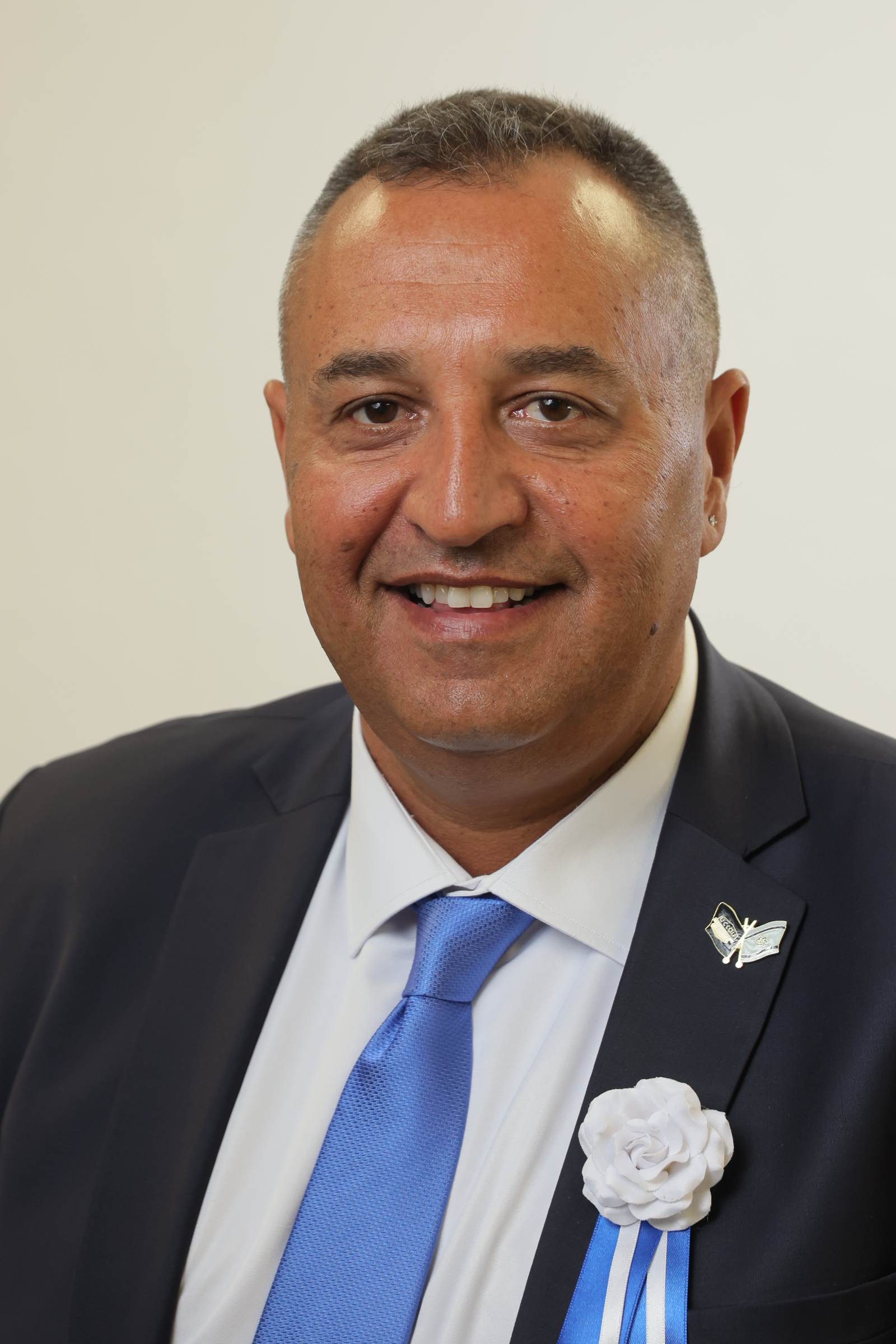

Faction represented in the Knesset
- 2021–2026: Yesh Atid

Personal details
- Born: 14 May 1970 (age 56) Vilnius, Soviet Union

Simon Davidson (Hebrew: סימון דוידסון; born 14 May 1970) is an Israeli politician who served as a member of the Knesset for Yesh Atid from 2021 until 2026. In the past he was chairman of the Israel Swimming Association.

== Biography ==
Davidson was born in Vilnius in the Lithuanian SSR of the Soviet Union in 1970. Two years later in 1972 his family immigrated to Israel. After completing his national service in the Israel Defense Forces he earned a bachelor's degree in education.

A swimmer, Davidson became a senior swimming coach. In 2016 he was appointed chairman of the Israel Swimming Association, and also became a member of the Olympic Committee of Israel.

Entering politics, Davidson joined the Yesh Atid party and was placed twenty-second on its list for the March 2021 Knesset elections. Although the party won only seventeen seats, he entered the Knesset in July 2021 as a replacement for Idan Roll, who resigned his seat under the Norwegian law after being appointed Deputy Minister of Foreign Affairs.
