= Mufid Mari =

Israeli Druze officer and politician

- מופיד מרעי

Faction represented in the Knesset
- 2021–2022: Blue and White

Personal details
- Born: 15 May 1959 (age 67) Hurfeish, Israel

Mufid Mari (Hebrew: מופיד מרעי; born 15 May 1959) is an Israeli Druze politician. He was a member in the Knesset for Blue and White from 2021 to 2022.

Chairman Board of Directors, Tel-Hai technological College https://www.telhai.ac.il/en

Member of the Jewish Agency of Governoes commitees https://www.jewishagency.org/board-of-governors/

== Biography ==
Mari was born and raised in Hurfeish, a Druze town in Northern Israel. His older brother, Colonel Nabiya Mari, was killed by Palestinian gunfire in 1996 while serving as deputy commander of the Gaza Division.

Mari joined the Israel Defense Forces and was the first Druze to enter via the Nahal service. He has achieved the rank of Aluf Mishne or deputy-Aluf corresponding to the rank of colonel or brigadier. He has commanded the Herev Brigade, the Hermon and Oded Brigade. He later became head of Hurfeish local council and served as chair of the association of Druze and Circassian local authorities.

He was placed ninth on the Blue and White list for the March 2021 elections. Although the party won only eight seats, he entered the Knesset on 15 June 2021 as a replacement for Hili Tropper, after he was appointed to the cabinet and resigned from the Knesset under the Norwegian Law. He was placed nineteenth on the National Unity list in the 2022 elections and did not return to the Knesset as the party won 12 seats.
