= Yasmin Fridman =

Israeli politician (born 1973)

- יסמין פרידמן
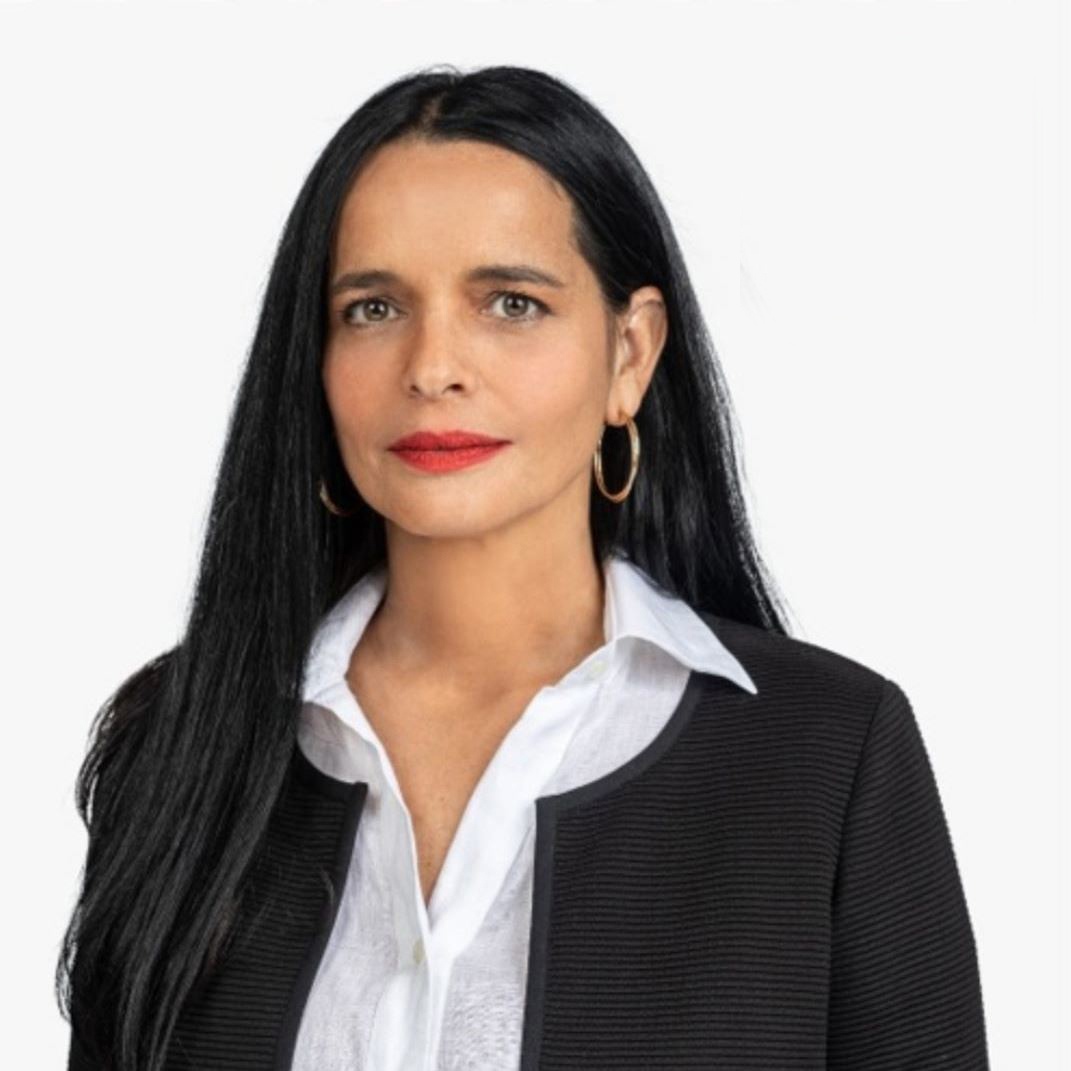

Faction represented in the Knesset
- 2021–2026: Yesh Atid

Personal details
- Born: 12 June 1973 (age 53) Beersheva, Israel

Yasmin Fridman (Hebrew: יסמין פרידמן; born 12 June 1973) is an Israeli politician. She was a member of Knesset for Yesh Atid from 2021 until 2026.

== Biography ==
She was placed 19th on the Yesh Atid list for the 2021 elections. Although the party won only 17 seats, she entered the Knesset on 15 June 2021 as a replacement for Orna Barbivai, after the latter was appointed to the cabinet and resigned from the Knesset under the Norwegian Law.
