= Yamina =

Israeli electoral alliance

Yamina ימינה
- Leader: Ayelet Shaked
- Founders: Naftali Bennett; Ayelet Shaked
- Founded: 29 July 2019 (first); 15 January 2020 (second)
- Dissolved: 10 October 2019 (first); 15 November 2022 (second)
- Ideology: National conservatism; Economic liberalism; Zionism; Factions: Religious Zionism; Secularism
- Political position: Right-wing to far-right
- National affiliation: Zionist Spirit (2022); The Jewish Home (2022)
- Member parties: New Right; National Union (until 2021); The Jewish Home (until 2020)
- Colours: Blue; Green (former)
- Slogan: Naftali Bennett - There is Alternative Leadership and With Bennett This is Possible

Election symbol
- טב (2019–2021) ב (2021–2022) ب (2021–2022)

Website
- yemina.co.il (archive)

Yamina or Yemina (Hebrew: יָמִינָה, lit. 'Rightwards') was an Israeli political alliance of right-wing parties that originally included the New Right and the Union of Right-Wing Parties (a union of The Jewish Home and Tkuma). The final incarnation of the alliance included only the New Right, as The Jewish Home left the alliance on 14 July 2020, and the Religious Zionist Party left on 20 January 2021.

The list was created ahead of the September 2019 Israeli legislative election, in which Yamina secured seven seats in the Knesset. The alliance was expected to split on 6 October, with the New Right as its own faction, while Tkuma and the Jewish Home will stay together, though the alliance continued to negotiate as a single bloc in the aftermath of the election. The meeting on 6 October was postponed, with some citing disagreements on whether Yamina should split, while others referred to it as a "technical" matter. The alliance did split on 10 October 2019, and re-formed on 15 January 2020 in the run-up to the 2020 Israeli legislative election.

== History ==
=== First formation ===
Logo until 2021

On 21 July 2019, after New Right fell below the electoral threshold in the April 2019 Israeli legislative election, New Right leader Naftali Bennett decided to give leadership of the party to Ayelet Shaked. In her opening leadership speech, Shaked declared that she will seek to unite with the Union of Right-Wing Parties (URWP) and other right-wing parties.

The following day, negotiations with the URWP began. The negotiations initially stalled, as URWP leader Rafi Peretz was unwilling to concede leadership of the list to Shaked, and disagreements arose over how many spots each of the three involved parties would receive on the list. Another subject that arose in the negotiations was whether the radical former URWP member Otzma Yehudit should be included in the new joint list.

Sara Netanyahu was recorded speaking with Michal Peretz, wife of Rafi Peretz, in an attempt to convince Peretz to retain his number one slot on the list; she was unsuccessful. It was also revealed that Benjamin Netanyahu was involved in the matter despite his denial.

On 29 July 2019, The URWP and the New Right agreed to a joint run with Ayelet Shaked leading the party list. As part of the agreement, the alliance declared that they would negotiate together to establish a right-wing government under Benjamin Netanyahu. On 12 August, the party unveiled "Yamina" as its name.

Following the September 2019 election, Yamina received seven seats, and there were discussions for a potential split soon afterwards. On 10 October, the party split into New Right and The Jewish Home–National Union.

=== Second formation ===
In preparation of the 2020 election, Yamina's member parties discussed potentially recreating the alliance. On 15 January 2020, Yamina was recreated with Naftali Bennett as leader.

Following the election, Yamina won six seats. By April, party leader Bennett was reportedly "considering all options" for Yamina's political future in response to the agreement establishing the Netanyahu-Gantz unity government. Bennett was reportedly frustrated with the new coalition government's decision to hold back on the issue of judicial reform.

In May 2020, Yamina announced that it would go to opposition. The day before, Peretz, the leader of The Jewish Home, had split from the party, and would be named as the Minister of Jerusalem in the thirty-fifth government of Israel. On 17 May 2020, Bennett met with Gantz, who also succeeded him as Defence Minister, and declared that Yamina was now a "head held high" member of the opposition.

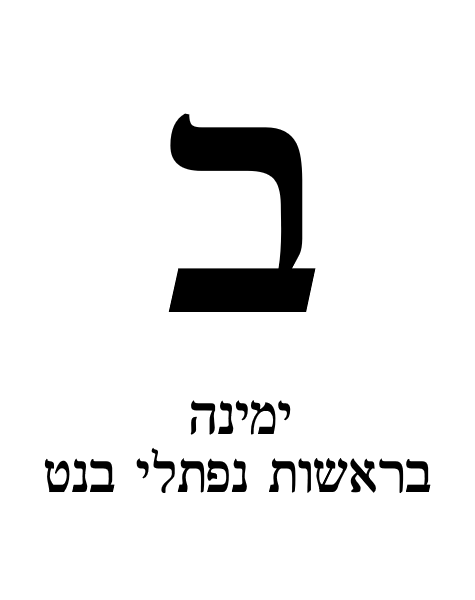
ballot paper used during the 2021 Election

Tkuma, which rebranded as the Religious Zionist Party on 7 January 2021, split from Yamina on 20 January. On 9 May 2021, it was reported that Bennett and Yesh Atid leader Yair Lapid had made major headway in the coalition talks for forming a new Israeli government. On 30 May 2021, Bennett announced in a televised address that Yamina would join a unity government with Yair Lapid after all but one Yamina MK agreed to back this decision. A poll at the time found that 61% of Yamina voters would not vote for the party due to it being part of the unity government.

On 13 June 2021, agreements were finalized for the Bennett–Lapid government, with Yamina as one of the coalition parties. During this government, several members of Yamina left the party, with Idit Silman and Amichai Chikli both defecting to Likud, while Abir Kara left to establish his own party called "Economic Freedom".

On 29 June 2022, the Knesset officially dissolved itself amidst disagreements within the governing coalition. Afterwards, Yamina party leader Naftali Bennett decided to step down from politics and handed party leadership to Ayelet Shaked.

On 27 July 2022, Yamina announced its partnership with Derekh Eretz to form the Zionist Spirit alliance to contest in the 2022 election. However, this alliance did not last and Yamina left on 11 September, instead favoring an alliance with The Jewish Home. Soon afterwards, Yamina and The Jewish Home agreed on a joint run, but disagreements remained on specific details. On 13 September, the two parties officially announced an electoral alliance.

This period saw increased divides within the party, where Bennett criticized party leader Shaked for suggesting that joining the 36th government was a "mistake". Also during this time, party members Matan Kahana and Shirly Pinto both left Yamina for National Unity.

During the 2022 election, Yamina failed to cross the electoral threshold. Afterwards, party leader Ayelet Shaked decided to retire from politics, and the party effectively dissolved.

In 2025, as former prime minister Naftali Bennett was in the process of founding his new Bennett 2026 party, he reportedly reached out to many of his colleagues during his time at Yamina.

== Platform ==
Ayelet Shaked listed 11 principles that the Yamina list is determined to uphold:

1. Jewish Identity: We will work to strengthen the Jewish identity of the State of Israel, and to strengthen the connection of Israeli students to the Torah, the Land of Israel, and the Jewish religious heritage.
2. Nationality: We will act for the implementation of the Nation-state Law and the prevention of any harm to it, while continuing to ensure individual rights and equality for all Israeli citizens.
3. Unity of the land: We are the only party that opposes the establishment of a Palestinian state and any withdrawal from the territories of the Land of Israel. We will work to develop settlements throughout the country.
4. Sovereignty: We will act for the full and equitable application of national sovereignty and the rule of law to all citizens and residents of Israel, including the end of the military administration of West Bank and the application of Israeli sovereignty to the Israeli-occupied West Bank.
5. Determination against terror: We will defeat terrorism with determination and without compromise, we will defeat Gaza border terrorism and end the allowances paid to terrorists by the Palestinian Authority. We will bring back the corpses of IDF soldiers and charge a price from Hamas for its actions, with total resistance to the release of imprisoned terrorists. We will act to assist disabled IDF veterans and the victims of the conflict.
6. Aliyah: We will work towards the implementation of a national Aliyah policy, which will promote Jewish immigration and remove unnecessary barriers to immigration. We will prevent illegal immigration of migrant workers to Israel and prevent the abuse of family re-unification policies.
7. Competition and liberty: We will promote competition to break up monopolies and cartels, open the economy to international competition, and reduce central planning in the economy. We will promote competition in the housing market, release land for construction, and implement taxation policies that will spur development. We will streamline regulation, reduce the regulatory burden on employers, which will encourage employment and productivity, and create a comfortable environment for a sharing economy and the high tech industry.
8. Right to work: We will reform the labor law so that unions can only represent all workers in a workplace if they have a majority of its workers unionized. We will implement mandatory government arbitration to solve labor disputes in essential government services and increase transparency in labor organizations.
9. Governability: We will strengthen the values of governability and democracy. We will strengthen the status of the Knesset as a legislative authority and restore confidence in the Supreme Court as the judicial authority, in accordance with the law. We will strengthen the status of elected officials in the face of the un-elected bureaucracy.
10. Social responsibility: We will enact economic and medical protection for the disabled and the elderly, while integrating people with disabilities in education, society, and the labor market.
11. Galilee and the Negev: We will strengthen the Galilee and the Negev with additional employment opportunities, housing, health care, tourism, culture, and transport. We will encourage capital investment and private initiatives that will strengthen human capital and allow families to settle and remain in the Galilee and the Negev. We will strengthen agriculture and the Labor settlements.

Alongside these united principles, each party retains its own independent platform. Thus, the New Right represents the more "liberal" Religious and Secular right, The Jewish Home represents "mainstream" Religious Zionism, while Tkuma represents the more hawkish and Chardal Religious Zionists.

== Composition ==
Name	Ideology	Position	Leader
New Right	National conservatism, economic liberalism	Right-wing to far-right	Ayelet Shaked
National Union (until 2021)	Religious Zionism, ultranationalism	Right-wing to far-right	Bezalel Smotrich
The Jewish Home (until 2020)	Religious Zionism, religious conservatism	Right-wing to far-right	Hagit Moshe

== Knesset members ==
Knesset term	Seats	Faction	Members
22nd (2019–2020)	3	New Right	Ayelet Shaked, Naftali Bennett, Matan Kahana
22nd (2019–2020)	4	Jewish Home–National Union	Rafi Peretz, Bezalel Smotrich, Moti Yogev, Ofir Sofer
23rd (2020–2021)	3	New Right	Naftali Bennett, Ayelet Shaked, Matan Kahana
23rd (2020–2021)	2	National Union	Bezalel Smotrich, Ofir Sofer
23rd (2020–2021)	1	Jewish Home	Rafi Peretz
24th (2021–2022)	7	New Right	Naftali Bennett, Ayelet Shaked, Matan Kahana, Amichai Chikli (Note: Defected to Likud during term, seat replaced by Yomtob Kalfon), Nir Orbach, Abir Kara (Note: Left Yamina during term to form his own Economic Freedom party), Idit Silman (Note: Defected to Likud during term, seat replaced by Orna Starkmann)

== Leaders ==
Leader	Took office	Left office
Ayelet Shaked	2019	2019
Naftali Bennett	2020	2022
Ayelet Shaked	2022	2022

== Election results ==
Election	Leader	Votes	%	Seats	+/–	Government
Sep 2019	Ayelet Shaked	260,655	5.87 (#7)	7 / 120	▲1	Snap election
2020	Naftali Bennett	240,162	5.25 (#8)	6 / 120	▼1	Opposition
2021	Naftali Bennett	273,836	6.21 (#5)	7 / 120	▲1	Coalition
2022	Ayelet Shaked	Part of The Jewish Home		0 / 120	▼7	Extraparliamentary
