= Elina Bardach-Yalov =

Israeli politician

- אלינה ברדץ'-יאלוב
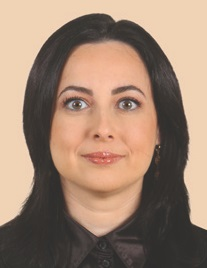

Faction represented in the Knesset
- 2021–2022: Yisrael Beiteinu

Personal details
- Born: 20 January 1982 (age 43) Moscow, Soviet Union

Elina Bardach-Yalov (Russian: Элина Бардач-Ялова, Hebrew: אלינה ברדץ'-יאלוב) is an Israeli politician. She was a member of Knesset for Yisrael Beiteinu.

== Political career ==
Elina Bardach-Yalov was placed tenth on the Yisrael Beiteinu list for the 2021 elections. Although the party won only eight seats, she entered the Knesset on 15 June 2021 as a replacement for Avigdor Lieberman, after he was appointed to the cabinet and resigned from the Knesset under the Norwegian Law.

== Committee work ==
=== 24th Knesset ===
- Member of the Committee on Public Petitions
- Member of the Committee on Labor, Welfare and Health
- Acting member of the Finance Committee
- Member of the Special Committee on Foreign Workers
- Member of the Special Committee on the Israel Citizens’ Fund
- Member of the Joint Committee on the Permanent Service Law in the IDF (pensions)
- Chair of the Subcommittee on Employment Promotion and Assistance to Pensioners without Pension Protection
- Member of the Subcommittee on Safety Engineering

== Lobby activity ==
=== 24th Knesset ===
- Chair of the Lobby for Road Safety
- Chair of the Lobby for Students
- Member of the Lobby for Strengthening the Status and Reputation of Israeli Culture among the Nations of the World
- Member of the Lobby for the Advancement and Equality of the Druze Community in Israel
- Chair of the Lobby for Promoting the Status of Women in the Periphery
- Member of the Lobby for Coastal Local Councils
- Member of the Lobby for the Jewish People

== Other positions in the Knesset ==
=== 24th Knesset ===
- Chair of the Israel–Kyrgyzstan Parliamentary Friendship Group
- Chair of the Israel–Nigeria Parliamentary Friendship Group
- Chair of the Israel–Azerbaijan Interparliamentary Friendship Group
- Chair of the Israel–Kazakhstan Parliamentary Friendship Group
- Member of the Knesset delegation to the NATO Parliamentary Assembly
- Chair of the Israel–Kenya Parliamentary Friendship Group

== Personal life ==
Elina Bardach-Yalov is married to Leonid Bardach. They live in Ashdod with their son Hananiael, born in 2013.
