= Tania Mazarsky =

Israeli politician

- טניה מזרסקי
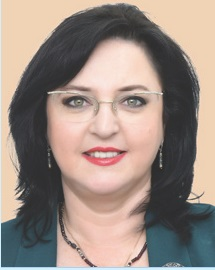

Faction represented in the Knesset
- 2021–2026: Yesh Atid

Personal details
- Born: 8 September 1976 (age 50) Soviet Union

Tania (or Tatiana) Mazarsky (Hebrew: טניה מזרסקי; born 8 September 1976) is an Israeli politician. She was a member of Knesset for Yesh Atid between 2021 and 2026.

== Biography ==
Tatiana Mazarsky was born in Bryansk, USSR in 1976.

After graduating from high school in Bryansk, USSR, Mazarsky made Aliyah at the age of 17 with the Young Aliyah Program of the Jewish Agency.

From 2003 through 2012 Mazarsky worked as a project coordinator and group coach at the Institute for the Jewish Zionist Education (MELITZ). She worked at the Absorption Center as a youth program coordinator and as coordinator of the Jewish Agency's "At Home Together" program. For several years, Mazarsky taught Jewish History at the Institute for Jewish Studies.

From 2012 through 2018 she was director of two "Leumit Health Care Services" medical centers in Karmiel. She was awarded certificates and diplomas for professionalism and successful management in the field of community healthcare. As director of the medical centers Mazarsky presented the Israeli health system to potential immigrants abroad and at the same time, also solved numerous social problems in the interest of the weaker population groups, helped new immigrants in finding employment in Israel, established and led groups of volunteers supporting Holocaust survivors and elderly people in Karmiel.

In 2016, "Yediot Ahronot" named Mazarsky as one of the 50 most influential Israeli public activists of the year.

She was placed 18th on the Yesh Atid list for the 2021 elections. Although the party won only 17 seats, she entered the Knesset on 15 June 2021 as a replacement for Yoel Razvozov, after he was appointed to the cabinet and resigned from the Knesset under the Norwegian Law.

On 1 September 2026, Mazarsky announced that she will not compete in the 2026 election but will remain a member of Yesh Atid.
