= 2020 Israeli legislative election =

- 2 March 2020
- All 120 seats in the Knesset; 61 seats needed for a majority
- Turnout: 71.52% (▲1.69pp)
Party	Leader	Vote %	Seats	+/–
Likud	Benjamin Netanyahu	29.46	36	+4
Blue and White	Benny Gantz	26.59	33	0
Joint List	Ayman Odeh	12.67	15	+2
Shas	Aryeh Deri	7.69	9	0
UTJ	Yaakov Litzman	5.98	7	0
Emet	Amir Peretz	5.83	7	−3
Yisrael Beiteinu	Avigdor Lieberman	5.74	7	−1
Yamina	Naftali Bennett	5.24	6	−1
This lists parties that won seats. See the complete results below.
Prime Minister before	Prime Minister after
Benjamin Netanyahu; Likud (caretaker)	Benjamin Netanyahu; Likud (35th)

Legislative elections were held in Israel on 2 March 2020 to elect members of the twenty-third Knesset. The result was initially a stalemate, which was resolved when Likud and Blue & White reached a coalition agreement. Under the terms of the agreement, the premiership would rotate between Benjamin Netanyahu and Benny Gantz, with Gantz given the new position of Alternate Prime Minister until November 2021. These elections followed the continued political deadlock after the April and September 2019 Knesset elections.

== Background ==
The extended period of political deadlock that led up to the election was the result of close races in April and September 2019 that left both incumbent Prime Minister Benjamin Netanyahu and opposition favorite Benny Gantz unable to muster a 61-seat governing majority, in coalition with their respective blocs of smaller, ideologically allied parties.

As a result, Netanyahu and Gantz agreed in principle that the only solution was a national unity government between Netanyahu's Likud and Gantz's Blue and White parties. However, substantial disagreements over the terms of such a government prevented one from being formed, as Netanyahu demanded the inclusion of his allied right-wing, religious parties, and Gantz refused to cooperate with a Netanyahu-led Likud as long as he was under indictment for alleged bribery and fraud.

Orly Adas, director of the Central Elections Committee, cautioned that she lacked the necessary funding and staff to conduct a third election, and President Reuven Rivlin stressed his desire to avoid calling one, repeatedly expressing his dismay at the failure to form a unity government. Nevertheless, as required by the Basic Law, he initiated on 21 November 2019 a 21-day period in which any member of the Knesset (MK) who received the support of 60 of their fellow lawmakers was allowed to try to form a government. After no MKs succeeded at this task by 11 December, Rivlin was forced to call the new election.

== Electoral system ==
The 120 seats in the Knesset are elected by closed list proportional representation in a single nationwide constituency. The electoral threshold for the election is 3.25%. In most cases, this implies a minimum party size of four seats, but it is mathematically possible for a party to pass the electoral threshold and have only three seats (since 3.25% of 120 members = 3.9 members).

=== Surplus-vote agreements ===
Two parties can sign a surplus-vote agreement that allows them to compete for leftover seats |as though they are running together on the same list. The Bader–Ofer method disproportionately favors larger lists, meaning that such an alliance is more likely to receive leftover seats than both of its comprising lists would be individually. If the alliance receives leftover seats, the Bader–Ofer calculation is then applied privately, to determine how the seats are divided among the two allied lists. The following agreements were signed by parties prior to the election:

- Likud and Yamina
- Blue and White and Labor-Gesher-Meretz
- United Torah Judaism and Shas

== Date ==
With the deadline to form a government ending at 11 December at midnight, elections called 90 days later should have been held on 10 March. However, as that date would have conflicted with the Jewish holiday of Purim, the election would have to be held either one week earlier on 3 March, or one week later on 17 March. A Knesset bill was required to be passed to allow the election date to be moved up to earlier in March. The date of 3 March conflicted with Israeli memorial day, so Likud pushed for an election date of 16 March, while Blue and White wanted an election held on 2 March. The two parties agreed to hold elections on 2 March 2020, and the required Knesset votes took place on 11 and 12 December to ratify 2 March.

== Parties ==
=== Parliamentary factions ===
At the end of the 22nd Knesset, there were ten factions in parliament.

Name	Ideology	Symbol	Primary demographic	Leader	September 2019 result	
Name	Ideology	Symbol	Primary demographic	Leader	Votes (%)	Seats
Blue and White	Liberalism	פה	–	Benny Gantz	25.94%	33 / 120
Likud	Conservatism; National liberalism	מחל	–	Benjamin Netanyahu	25.1%	32 / 120
Joint List	Big tent Minority interests	ודעם	Israeli Arabs	Ayman Odeh	10.6%	13 / 120
Shas	Religious conservatism	שס	Sephardi and Mizrahi Haredim	Aryeh Deri	7.44%	9 / 120
Yisrael Beiteinu	Nationalism; Secularism	ל	Russian-speakers	Avigdor Lieberman	6.98%	8 / 120
United Torah Judaism	Religious conservatism	ג	Ashkenazi Haredim	Yaakov Litzman	6.06%	7 / 120
Jewish Home–National Union	Religious Zionism	טב	Modern Orthodox and Chardal Jews	Rafi Peretz	5.87%	4 / 120
New Right	National conservatism	טב	–	Naftali Bennett	5.87%	3 / 120
Labor-Gesher	Social democracy	אמת	–	Amir Peretz	4.80%	6 / 120
Democratic Union	Progressivism	מרצ	–	Nitzan Horowitz	4.34%	5 / 120

=== Contesting parties ===
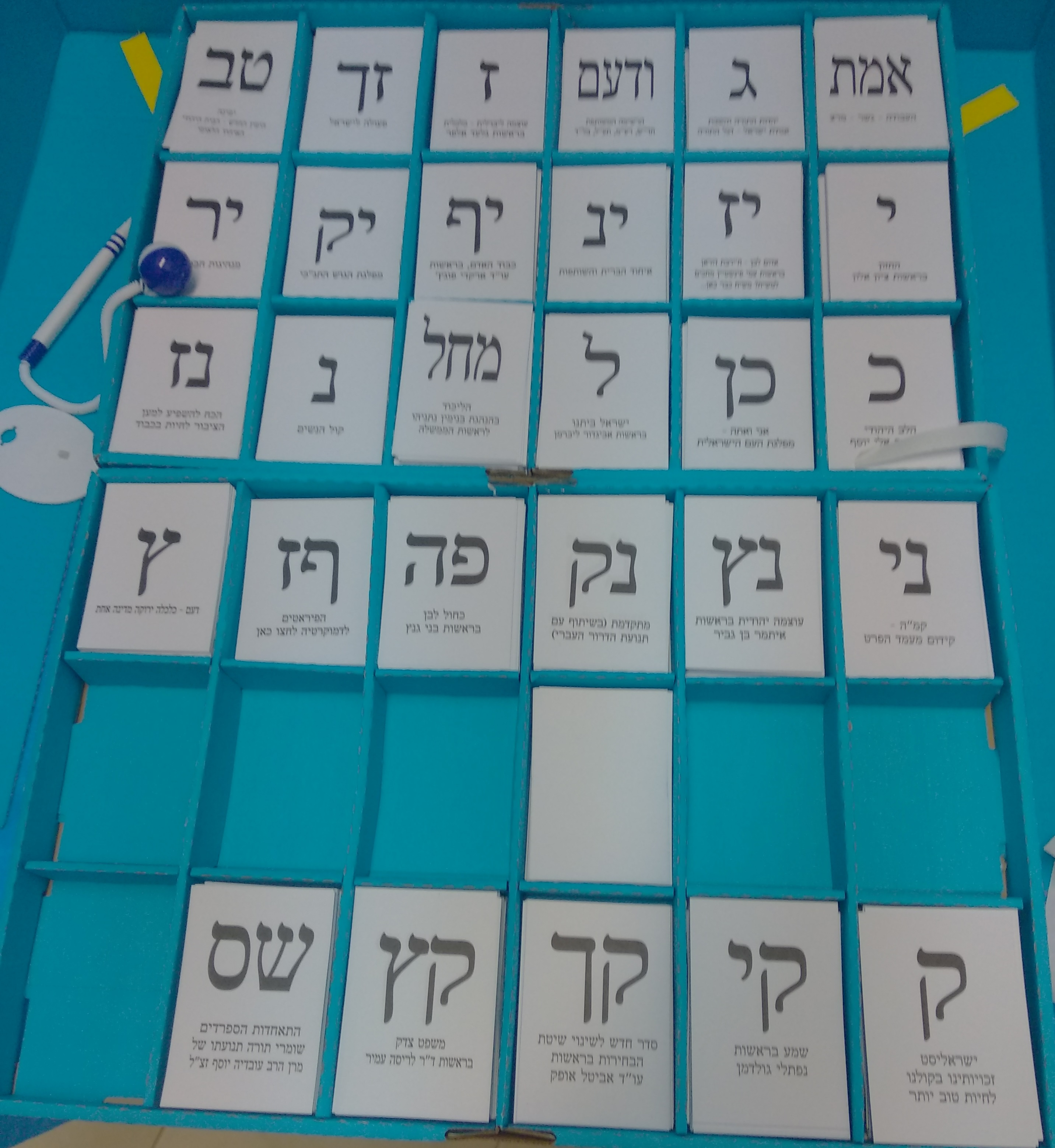
Ballot papers during the election

- The central committee of the Likud party, on 8 December 2019, voted to cancel the primary for its electoral list. However, an internal Likud court ruled on 19 December that it was unconstitutional, as the Likud constitution would have to be amended if primaries were cancelled. The central committee approved, on 12 December, the holding of a leadership primary for the party on 26 December, in which Netanyahu defeated his challenger, Gideon Sa'ar. The Likud court, on 23 December 2019, overturned the decision to hold a primary for the Knesset slate. Likud filed its list on 16 January.
- Yair Lapid of the Blue and White alliance (פה) indicated that he would abandon a previous agreement to rotate the premiership with Benny Gantz if another election takes place, meaning that only Gantz would be the Blue and White candidate for prime minister. The party submitted its list on 15 January.
- Joint List (ודעם)
- Labor-Gesher-Meretz (אמת): Labor and Gesher announced on 15 December that they would stay together for the March election. Labor announced on 15 December that Amir Peretz would remain head of the party. Both of the decisions were ratified by the Labor Central Committee on 25 December, in addition to allowing Peretz to select two candidates for the first ten slots on the list, which would move down other candidates. The Meretz party decided on 16 December against holding a leadership primary. The party held a vote on 22 December and decided against holding a primary for the Knesset list (instead keeping the same slate of candidates as the previous election) and also confirmed Nitzan Horowitz as leader of the party. The Democratic Union initially announced on 7 January 2020 that it would run in the elections. On 7 January 2020, Peretz proposed the creation of a centre-left political alliance between his party, the Blue and White party, and the Democratic Union. On 8 January, Gantz ruled out uniting with any party and suggested that Labor-Gesher merge with the Democratic Union. On 12 January, Labor announced that it was negotiating a joint list with Meretz to prevent the possibility of either party not making the electoral threshold and not entering the Knesset. Labor and Meretz announced a joint run on 13 January 2020, with the Labor party central committee voting in favor of ratification of the alliance the following day. Meretz approved the alliance on 14 January. The alliance submitted its list on 15 January.
- Shas (שס)
- Yisrael Beiteinu (ל)
- United Torah Judaism(ג)
- Yamina (טב): The Jewish Home and Otzma Yehudit announced on 20 December that they would run on a joint list (later named the United Jewish Home) and had called on Tkuma to join them. However, Jewish Home leader Rafi Peretz faced backlash on 21 December from over 80 officials of the party (including Jewish Home's "number 2", Moti Yogev) indicating that Peretz reached the deal with Otzma Yehudit unilaterally, and further warning that if the deal was not annulled, they would "convene" the central committee and announce party primaries. (They claim Peretz was against open primaries as he supposedly was afraid of losing his leadership position). They also sought a vote on the merger by the parties' central committee. The merger was approved by the central committee on 13 January. Ayelet Shaked announced on 19 December that she would remain a member of the New Right, running as the number two on the party's list. A joint run between itself and Tkuma was announced on 14 January, following a collapse in negotiations between Tkuma and The Jewish Home. One apparent cause for the collapse was the cancellation of the vote to approve the merger between Tkuma and Jewish Home. The Jewish Home MK Moti Yogev, Shaked, New Right head Naftali Bennett and Tkuma head Bezalel Smotrich had all called on Peretz to join the New Right and Tkuma list. Peretz had insisted that he would not abandon the agreement he signed with Otzma Yehudit, though he ultimately reneged on his promise and the Jewish Home, Tkuma and the New Right reformed the Yamina alliance.
- The new Kol Hanashim Women's Party (נ), headed by Dr. Mazal Shaul, Sharon Roffe Ofir, Orit Taie and Dr. Elana Maryles Sztokman is running on a platform of women's leadership and gender equality.

=== Not running ===
- Moshe Feiglin of Zehut announced on 13 December 2019 that his party would not run in the election.
- Noam announced on 2 January 2020 that it would not run in the election.
- Stav Shaffir initially announced on 25 December that she would run independently as head of the Green Movement, though was still working on creating an alliance of the Labor Party, Meretz, the Green Party and allies of former prime minister Barak, going as far as raising the possibility of giving her second slot on the Democratic Union list to Issawi Frej, an Arab member of Meretz. She let go of her demand for the second place on the list on 4 January 2020 in an attempt to keep the Democratic Union list united, though her Green Party was not included in the Democratic Union alliance or the Labor-Gesher-Meretz alliance. She rebutted Horowitz' claim that she was offered the fifth seat on the Meretz list, instead stating that she would have received the second slot, but at the cost of "ousting" Golan and "dismantling" the Democratic Union, which she was unwilling to do. Shaffir announced on 15 January that her party would not contest the elections.
- Moshe Gerin of Tzomet announced that the party would not participate in the election and would instead support Likud.

== Opinion polls ==
This graph shows the polling trends from the 17 September 2019 Israeli legislative election until election day using 4-poll moving average. Scenario polls are not included here.

For parties not crossing the electoral threshold (currently 3.25%) in any given poll, the number of seats is calculated as a percentage of the 120 total seats.

Local regression of polls conducted

=== Exit polls ===
Three television channels released exit polls shortly after polls closed at 22:00. Following their release, Netanyahu tweeted "Thanks" in Hebrew. Around three hours later, two of the channels released updated polls that took into account voting between 20:00 and 22:00, which showed a slight drop in predicted seats for the right-wing bloc.

Source	Likud	B&W	JL	Shas	L–G–M	UTJ	Yamina	YB
Channel 12 (initial)	37	33	14	9	7	7	7	6
Channel 13 (initial)	37	32	14	9	6	8	6	8
Kan	36	33	15	9	6	8	7	6
Channel 12 (updated)	37	32	15	9	7	7	6	7
Channel 13 (updated)	37	34	14	9	7	7	6	6
Source: The Times of Israel

== Results ==
Largest party by Administrative district (left) and sub-district (right)
Likud
Blue and White
Joint List

Party	Votes	%	Seats	+/–
Likud	1,352,449	29.46	36	+4
Blue and White	1,220,381	26.59	33	0
Joint List	581,507	12.67	15	+2
Shas	352,853	7.69	9	0
United Torah Judaism	274,437	5.98	7	0
Labor-Gesher-Meretz	267,480	5.83	7	–3
Yisrael Beiteinu	263,365	5.74	7	–1
Yamina	240,689	5.24	6	–1
Otzma Yehudit	19,402	0.42	0	0
Liberal–Economic Power	3,781	0.08	0	New
Women's Voice	2,773	0.06	0	New
The Pirates – For Democracy Click Here	1,473	0.03	0	0
Mishpat Tzedek	1,375	0.03	0	New
Israelist – Our Rights in Our Vote	980	0.02	0	0
Me and You	812	0.02	0	New
Ihud HaBrit VeHaShutafut	677	0.01	0	0
New Order	677	0.01	0	0
Koah Lehashpi'a	667	0.01	0	New
Mitkademet	622	0.01	0	0
Da'am–Green Economy–One Nation	612	0.01	0	0
Jewish Heart	516	0.01	0	New
Shama	442	0.01	0	New
Bible Bloc	389	0.01	0	0
Kama	350	0.01	0	0
Red and White	342	0.01	0	0
Vision	308	0.01	0	New
Social Leadership	271	0.01	0	0
Human Dignity	222	0.00	0	0
Action for Israel	210	0.00	0	New
Total	4,590,062	100.00	120	0
Valid votes	4,590,062	99.46		
Invalid/blank votes	25,073	0.54		
Total votes	4,615,135	100.00		
Registered voters/turnout	6,453,255	71.52		
Source: CEC (votes), Times of Israel (seats)

== Aftermath ==
On 8 March 2020, Lieberman gave Gantz his backing to form a new government. The next day, the Joint List agreed to work with Gantz and Lieberman to oust Netanyahu. Orly Levy announced on 10 March that she would not support a minority government and had unofficially left the Labor–Gesher–Meretz alliance. Blue and White MKs Zvi Hauser and Yoaz Hendel had previously stated that they would not support a government that relied on the Joint List's support. An aide to Gantz also stated that he plans to form a government by 23 March. Lieberman and Labor party leader Amir Peretz also reaffirmed on 11 March that an alliance with the Joint List would not change their party's position on forming a political alliance with Gantz.

The elected MKs were sworn in on 16 March 2020. On 15 March, Israeli President Reuven Rivlin announced that he had asked Gantz to form the new government after Gantz received support from 61 of the 120 MKs.

Prior to the election, Gantz vowed to form a government that would not include Netanyahu. However, after the election and with the outbreak of the COVID-19 pandemic in Israel, Gantz reversed his stance and announced he was willing to support an emergency coalition with Netanyahu. On 21 March, Netanyahu announced negotiations were completed for a national unity government with a rotating prime ministership where Netanyahu served first, to later be replaced by Gantz, although Gantz denied this and claimed negotiations were still ongoing. On 26 March, one day after Knesset Speaker Yuli Edelstein resigned, Gantz instead agreed to become Speaker of the Knesset. The fact that right-wingers in Netanyahu's coalition agreed to support Gantz's bid to become speaker put the future of the Blue and White alliance in jeopardy. The same day, MKs elected Gantz as the new Speaker of the Knesset by a margin of 74–18.

On 27 March 2020, it was revealed that a major obstacle to a possible long-term alliance between Gantz and Netanyahu emerged with regards to implementing U.S. President Donald Trump's Middle East peace plan. Barak Ravid of Israel's Channel 13 news revealed that despite Gantz's previous claim that he wanted to implement the peace plan, Gantz still wanted to hold peace talks with the Palestinians, which Trump and Netanyahu still opposed. Ravid stated that this would likely make the upcoming deal between Gantz and Netanyahu short-lived. As part of the proposed coalition deal between Netanyahu and Gantz, Gantz would replace Netanyahu as Prime Minister of Israel in 18 months. On 12 April, Rivlin announced that he had denied Gantz's request for a two-week extension to form a government. Despite Likud requests for Rivlin to ask Netanyahu to form a new government, Rivlin hinted that he will also deny Netanyahu the right to a new government if no agreement between Gantz and Netanyahu was signed on 13 April 2020. If no deal is signed, and if the MKs do not change the PM recommendation numbers by midnight on 13 April, the Knesset will either hold a vote for PM candidates or approve another round of elections. Netanyahu acknowledged that he and Gantz were not close to signing a coalition deal. On 13 April 2020, Rivlin agreed to extend the mandate for Gantz by another 48 hours after Gantz and Netanyahu both agreed to continue negotiations for a coalition government.

Negotiations between Gantz and Netanyahu expired after the two failed to produce a coalition government by 15 April deadline. On 16 April, Rivlin responded by giving the Knesset a 21-day deadline to choose a new prime minister. If no candidate is selected, another round of elections will be held. The next election would likely be held by 4 August 2020. Despite not agreeing to a coalition government by the required deadline, Netanyahu and Gantz still pledged to continue talks. However, on 17 April, a source close to Finance Minister Moshe Kahlon and an anonymous high-ranking Likud minister who spoke with Shas Party chairman Aryeh Deri told Al-Monitor that Kahlon and Deri were showing signs of splitting with Netanyahu, with Kahlon planning to also resign as Finance Minister. It was also reported that Deri, who serves as the mediator of talks between Gantz and Netanyahu, "might even be open to a new alliance with Blue and White — now that its anti-clerical component, Yair Lapid, quit the party and went his own way", and would only continue to support Netanyahu until the next election.

On 20 April, Netanyahu and Gantz signed the original coalition proposal which will see Netanyahu remain for power for only another 18 months was agreed to. After Netanyahu steps down, Gantz will take over as Israeli prime minister for at least 18 months. It was also agreed that the new Israeli government would have an equal number of cabinet ministers aligned with Likud and Blue and White. Blue and White received the Justice, Economy, Labor and Welfare, Communications, Agriculture, Culture and Sports, Absorption, Tourism, Minorities, Diaspora, Science and Space, Strategic Affairs, and Social Affairs ministries. The positions of foreign minister, energy minister and environmental protection minister will rotate upon the change of prime minister. The terms of the agreement also provide that Gantz serve as defense minister when the new government is sworn in, and would automatically become interim prime minister if early elections were to be called. The number of specific safeguarding clauses highlighted the mutual distrust of the two coalition partners.

On 22 April, it was reported that the Netanyahu-aligned Yamina political alliance, headed by interim defence minister Naftali Bennett, had not yet agreed to join the new coalition government, and was now "considering all options", including breaking with Netanyahu and joining the opposition. Bennett was said to be unhappy with the new coalition government's decision to hold back on judicial reform. The same day, however, officials from both the United Torah Judaism (UTJ) and Labor parties signed the coalition deal. As conditions for signing the deal, members from UTJ will serve as health minister and Knesset Finance Committee chairmanship, and will also hold two deputy minister positions and another Knesset committee chair, while Labor leader Amir Peretz will serve as economic minister and will coordinate with Blue and White on parliamentary matters and policy issues. The Labor Party voted in favor of joining the government on 26 April 2020.

On 30 April, the bill approving the new coalition government was given its first approval in Knesset. On 6 May, the coalition agreement was approved by the Israeli Supreme Court. The same day, both Blue and White and Likud issued a joint statement claiming that the new unity government would be sworn in the following week. On 7 May, the bill approving the new government became law after it was given final approval in the Knesset. Netanyahu and the new Israeli government were sworn in on 17 May. On 23 December, the Knesset again dissolved, resulting in the need for new elections.

== See also ==
- 2020 in Israel
- Elections in Israel
- List of elections in 2020
- List of members of the twenty-third Knesset
