= Orna Starkmann =

Israeli politician

- אורנה שטרקמן
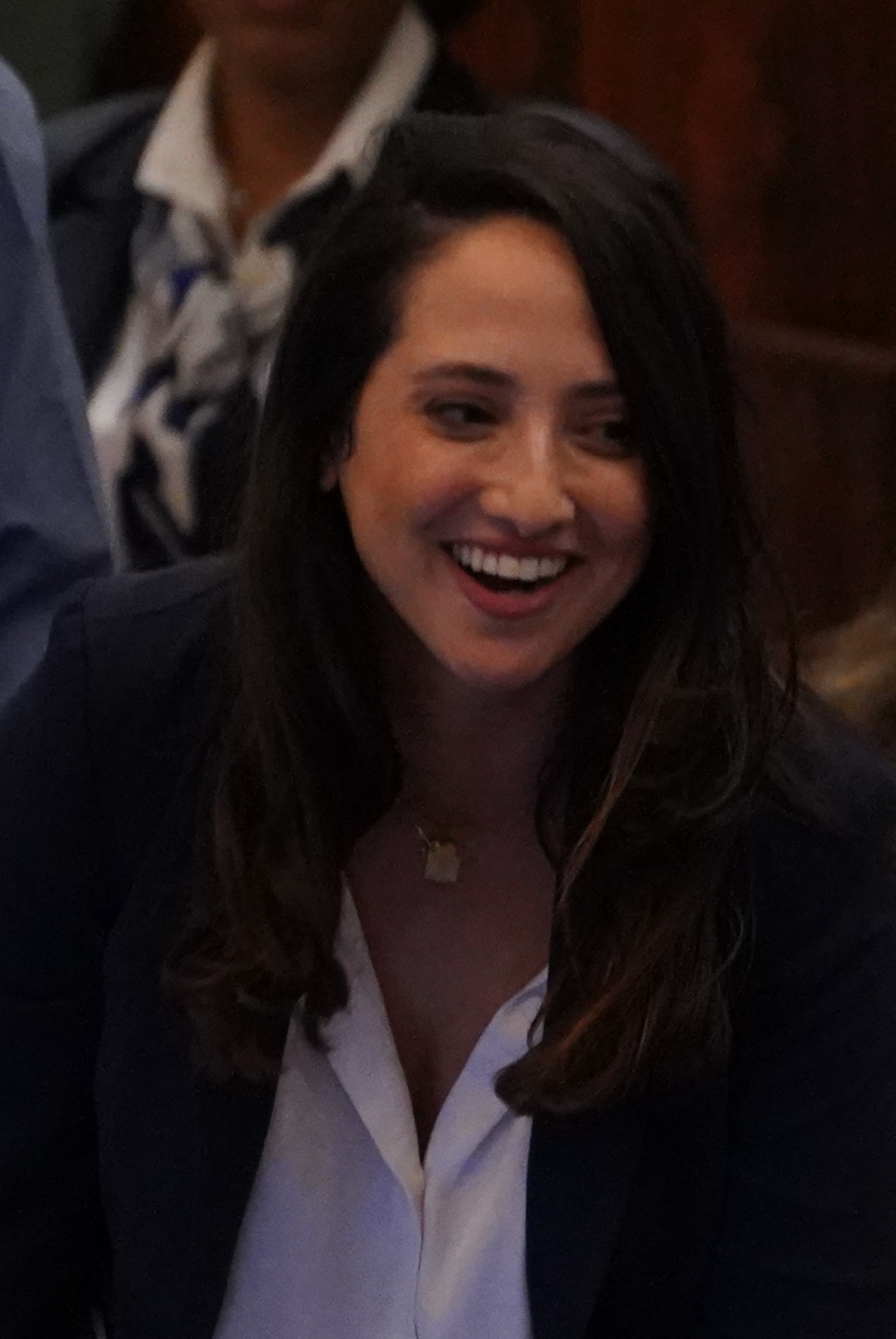
- Orna Starkmann

Faction represented in the Knesset
- 2022: Yamina

Personal details
- Born: 16 November 1984 (age 41) Nahariya, Israel

Orna Starkmann (Hebrew: אורנה שטרקמן; born 16 November 1984) is an Israeli politician who served as a member of the Knesset for Yamina in 2022. Starkmann is a former deputy mayor of Nahariya.

== Biography ==
Starkmann was born in Nahariya to Michael and Hannah Starkmann, who owned a small hotel. Starkmann later became the hotel's manager, and led a protest by hotel owners against the Israeli government during the COVID-19 pandemic. She has a master's degree in business administration.

In 2013, Starkmann ran for Nahariya's city council as part of a local list, known as 'The Next Generation'. She was elected to the council alongside the list's leader, Or Cohen. Following the election, Cohen became a Deputy Mayor, serving under Mayor Jackie Sabag. He left the party in 2015, leading to Starkmann becoming the list's leader and being appointed deputy mayor. She was re-elected in 2018 but did not remain in the municipal cabinet and ceased to be a deputy mayor.

Ahead of the 2021 legislative election, Starkmann was placed on the fourteenth spot on Yamina's electoral list. She entered the Knesset in September 2022 following the resignation of Idit Silman. Ahead of the 2022 election, Starkmann was placed on the sixth spot of a joint list between Yamina and The Jewish Home. Starkmann lost her seat as the list failed to cross the electoral threshold.

Starkmann has three younger sisters.
