= Ayelet Shaked =

Israeli politician, activist, and engineer (born 1976)

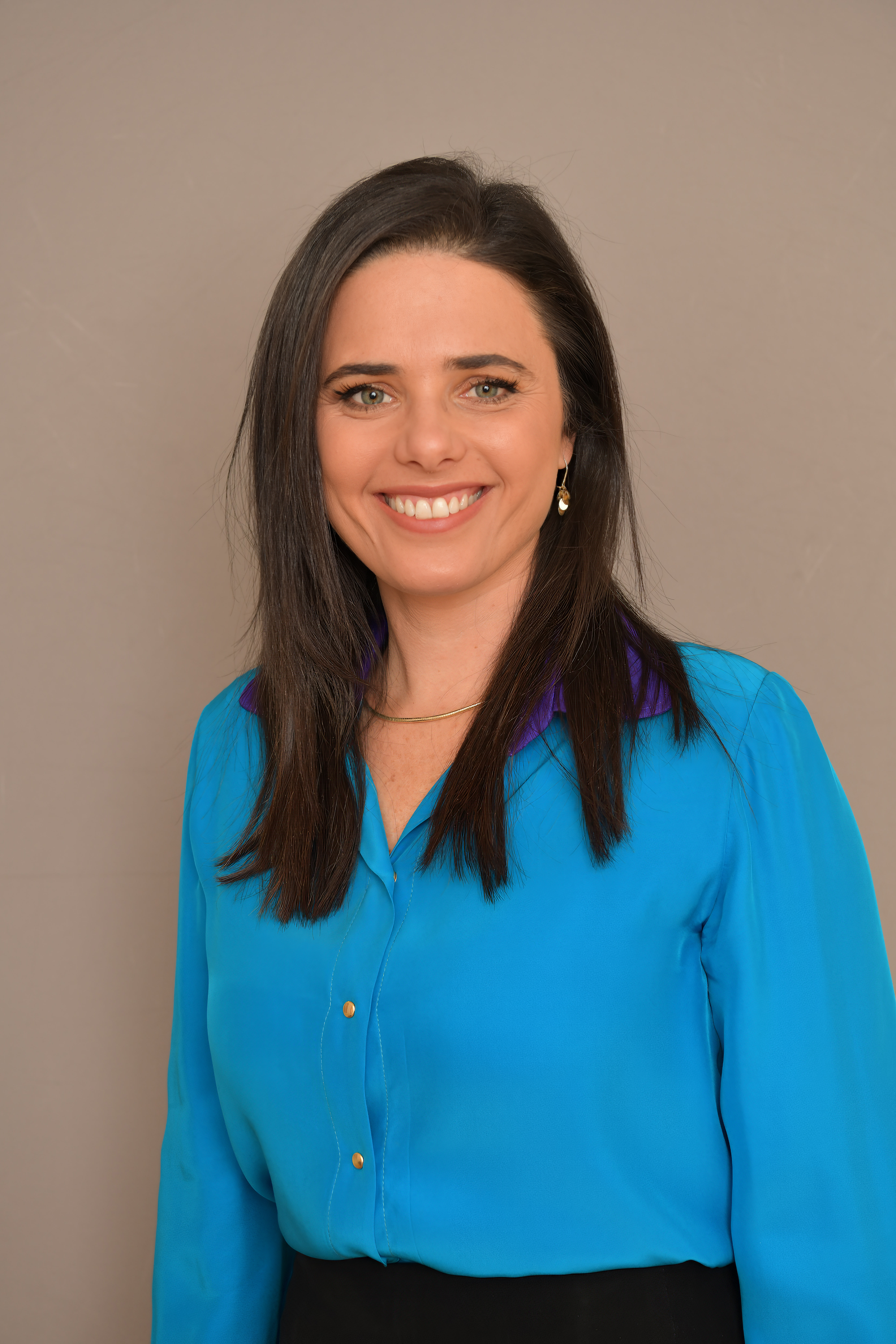
- Shaked in 2021

Ministerial roles
- 2015–2019: Minister of Justice
- 2021–2022: Minister of Interior

Faction represented in the Knesset
- 2013–2018: The Jewish Home
- 2018–2019: New Right
- 2019: Yamina
- 2019–2020: New Right
- 2020–2021: Yamina

Personal details
- Born: 7 May 1976 (age 50) Tel Aviv, Israel

Ayelet Shaked (Note: née Ben-Shaul (בֵּן שָׁאוּל)) (Hebrew: אַיֶּילֶת שָׁקֵד [aˈjelet ʃaˈked]; born 7 May 1976) is an Israeli former politician, activist, and software engineer. She served as Minister of Interior from 2021 to 2022 and as Minister of Justice from 2015 to 2019. Between 2013 and 2021, she was a representative in the Knesset as a member of The Jewish Home from 2013 to 2018, and then as a founding member of the New Right from 2018 to 2019 and again from 2019 to 2020. Shaked also served as the leader of the defunct right-wing electoral alliance Yamina. Despite her tenure in The Jewish Home, a religious political party, she has identified as a secularist.

Before entering politics, Shaked began her career in the Israeli high-tech industry, working as an engineer at Texas Instruments shortly after graduating from Tel Aviv University. In 2010, she co-founded the "My Israel" extra-parliamentary movement alongside Naftali Bennett and led it until May 2012. Later, in 2019, Shaked, Bennett, and Shuli Mualem founded the New Right, which did not pass the electoral threshold in the April 2019 legislative election. Afterwards, Shaked planned to join Likud, but Miri Regev did not allow her to do so. When Israeli prime minister Benjamin Netanyahu failed to form a coalition government in the run-up to the September 2019 legislative election, Shaked ended up succeeding Bennett as leader of the New Right.

Shaked was considered to be one of the country's most active and influential legislators. She has initiated and drafted various laws, including the 2016 NGO law, the comprehensive national anti-terrorism law, a version of the proposal for Basic Law: Israel as the Nation-State of the Jewish People, and a law limiting the powers of the Israeli Supreme Court.

== Early life ==
Shaked was born in Tel Aviv on 7 May 1976, to a well-educated, upper-middle-class family of Israeli Jews. She is of Mizrahi descent on her father's side (Iraqi-Jewish) and of Ashkenazi descent on her mother's side (Russian-Jewish and Romanian-Jewish): her paternal grandmother immigrated to Israel from Iraq as a single mother in the 1950s, as part of the Jewish exodus from the Muslim world, and carefully invested her money into property and the education of her children; and her maternal ancestors immigrated to Ottoman Palestine from the Russian Empire and Romania in the 1880s, as part of the First Aliyah. Her father was an accountant by profession and hailed from a right-wing background, having voted Likud, while her mother was a Bible teacher and hailed from a centre-left background. Shaked has described herself as "half-Iraqi and proud of it" with regard to her heritage.

In Tel Aviv, she grew up in the upper-middle-class neighbourhood of Bavli. She identified her political awakening and right-wing orientation to when she was eight years old, after watching a television debate between Yitzhak Shamir and Shimon Peres, wherein she supported the conservative views of Shamir. As a teenager, she was a main instructor in the Hebrew Scouts Movement in Israel.

=== Education and military service ===
Shaked served in the Israel Defense Forces as an infantry instructor with the Golani Brigade; she was enlisted in the 12th Barak (Lightning) Battalion as well as in Sayaret Golani. She later enrolled in Tel Aviv University, graduating with a Bachelor of Science in the disciplines of electrical engineering and computer science, and subsequently began her career in the Israeli high-tech industry; Shaked was employed at Texas Instruments as a software engineer and later became manager of the company's marketing department.

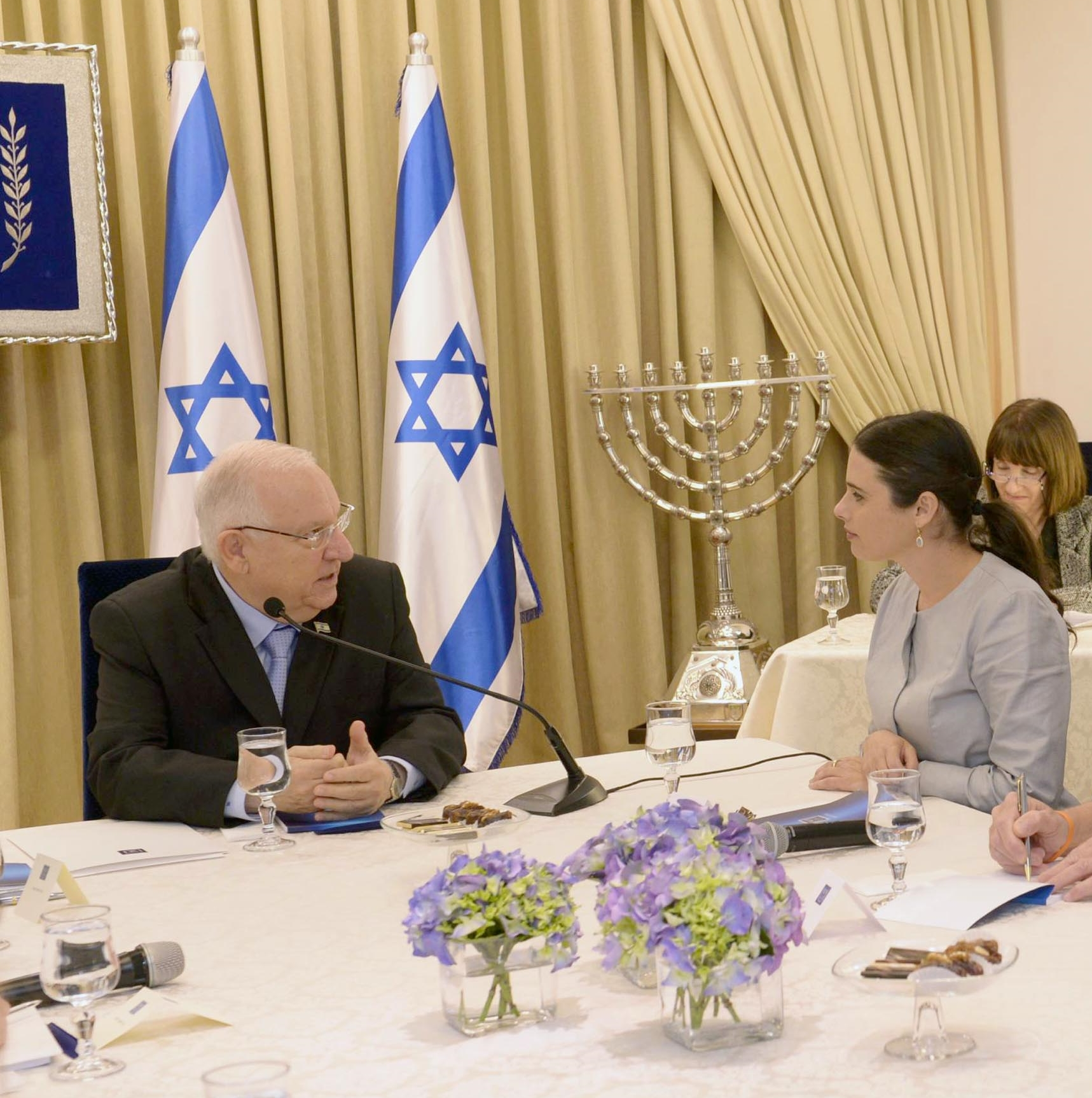
Shaked with Israeli president Reuven Rivlin in post-election consultations, 23 March 2015

== Political career ==
From 2006 to 2008, Shaked was office director for the office of Benjamin Netanyahu. In 2010 she established My Israel with Naftali Bennett and led it until May 2012.

From the end of 2011, Shaked campaigned against illegal immigration from Africa to Israel, saying that it poses a threat to the state and also involves severe economic damage. She also campaigned against Galei Tzahal saying it had a "left-leaning agenda".

In January 2012, Shaked was elected to serve as a member of the Likud's Central Committee; however, in June 2012 she resigned and joined the Jewish Home. On 14 November 2012, she won third place in the party's primaries and was placed in the fifth spot on the Jewish Home list for the 2013 elections. With the list winning 12 seats, Shaked became the only secular Jewish Home MK. She subsequently joined the Economic Affairs Committee, the House Committee, and the Committee on Foreign Workers, and served as an alternate member on the Finance Committee. She also chaired the Knesset Committee for the Enforcement of the Security Service Law and the National-Civilian Service Law and the Special Committee for the Equal Sharing of the Burden Bill.

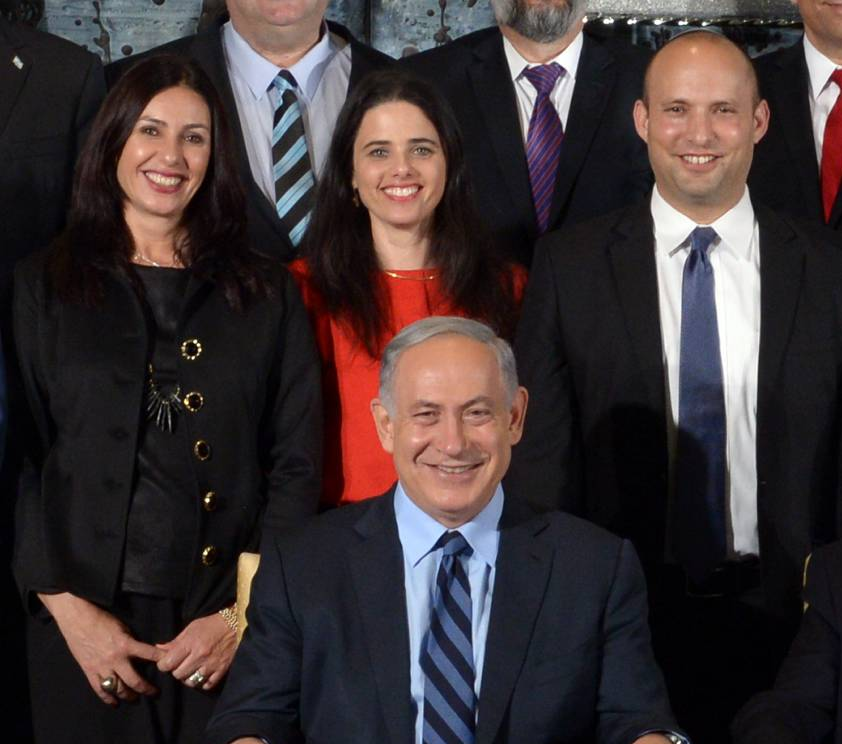
19 May 2015: Shaked (middle centre) as Minister of Justice, next to Miri Regev (left) as Minister of Culture and Naftali Bennett (right) as Minister of Education, above Benjamin Netanyahu (lower centre) as Prime Minister of Israel.

In June 2014, Shaked posted an article by the late Israeli writer Uri Elitzur on Facebook. The Facebook post was variously described in the media as calling Palestinian children "little snakes" and appearing to justify mass punishment of Palestinians. Based upon the Facebook post, the then Turkish Prime Minister Recep Tayyip Erdoğan said that Shaked's mindset was no different from Adolf Hitler's. Israeli Prime Minister Benjamin Netanyahu condemned Erdoğan's comments, stating "Erdogan's anti-Semitic comments profaned the memory of the Holocaust." The leader of Israeli leftist Meretz party, Zehava Gal-On, suggested that "because of the presidential election Erdoğan has lost control." Shaked stated that her post was portrayed falsely in the media, especially in that the article was presented as her own words rather than Elitzur's. She said, "I refer specifically to 'Daily Beast' writer Gideon Resnick, who so misrepresented the facts in one of my recent Facebook posts, one has to wonder if his hatred for my country hasn't rendered him outright useless to his website and his readers."

In 2015, Shaked won the primary election for the Jewish Home Party, which was considered an achievement as a secular female politician within a religious party.

In December 2018 Shaked was amongst the Jewish Home MKs to leave the party and form the breakaway New Right party. In the April 2019 Knesset elections, New Right narrowly failed to cross the electoral threshold; as a result, Shaked did not gain a seat in the 21st Knesset. Following the loss, Shaked initially announced that she will take a break from politics for an undetermined period of time.

On 30 May 2019, after Netanyahu failed to form a governing coalition, the Knesset voted to dissolve itself and a snap election was called which was set to be held on 17 September. Shaked announced on 21 July that she would take part in the elections as the leader of New Right and on 29 July as the leader of the Yamina alliance, which is composed of the New Right, Tkuma and the Jewish Home. Yamina won seven seats at the elections. After no MK was able to form a government, yet another election was called, set to be held on 2 March 2020. At this election, Yamina won six seats.

=== Minister of Justice ===
Shaked was placed third on the Jewish Home list for the 2015 elections, and was re-elected to the Knesset. On 6 May 2015, it was reported that Prime Minister Benjamin Netanyahu had agreed to appoint Shaked as Minister of Justice as part of a plan to form a new coalition government. Shaked took office as Justice Minister on 14 May 2015.

In July 2015, Shaked announced that she was forming a committee to create a stable legal structure for the Israeli settlements in the West Bank. The formation of the committee was agreed upon in the coalition agreement between Bayit Yehudi and Likud. She has stated: "There are many areas in Judea and Samaria, whose legal status has not been organized. It's time to remove the legal ambiguity, and allow the residents of Judea and Samaria, many of whom live in settlements that were built by the Israeli government, to live without the persistent fear of challenges to their property ownership". The legal status of the West Bank is disputed; the Palestinians, the UN, human rights organizations and most of the international community consider it to be occupied Palestinian territory.

In January 2016, Shaked sponsored a bill in the Knesset that would require non-governmental organizations ("NGOs") that receive a majority of their funding from "foreign government entities" to be so labeled. In an interview in The Washington Post she stated that the law would foster transparency by giving the public the right "to know which NGOs are receiving most of their support from foreign governments and therefore representing foreign government interests." She further explained that this was a standard she wasn't willing to apply to foreign private donors, pointed out to provide the disproportionate source of funding for conservative NGOs, because she viewed countries' governments' diplomatic channels in and of themselves as providing so much interference "above the radar" that they compensated that given "below the radar" by the private donors, with the ability for them bypassing this process upsetting the already-fair equilibrium.

In June 2016 the Israeli Knesset passed a comprehensive 2016 Counter-Terrorism Law, forbidding any kind of terrorism and support of terrorism, and setting severe punishments for terrorists. The law also regulates legal efforts against terrorism and counter-terrorism measures. The law was sponsored and promoted by Justice Minister Shaked.

In June 2019 Netanyahu dismissed Shaked from the government.

=== Minister of Interior ===
Following the formation of the 36th government, Shaked became head of the interior ministry where she holds "critical authority" in policy areas including "housing construction, immigration and citizenship".

During her post as interior minister, Shaked pledged to facilitate returns for migrants and asylum seekers to third countries, and considered it a "strategic matter" for border security. Following the outbreak of the 2022 Russian invasion of Ukraine creating the Ukrainian refugee crisis, Shaked announced that Israel will host 25,000 Ukrainian citizens under temporary status until the end of the war, in addition to an esitmated 100,000 Jews making aliyah under the Law of Return.

Shaked also continued to enforce a law banning family reunification for Palestinian spouses of Israeli citizens even after its expiration, with the Supreme Court eventually ruling that government offices "must act under the law as it is" rather than on "predicted legislation".

In May 2022, Shaked announced that she will veto any attempt by the sitting government to amend the Nation State bill.

=== Retirement from politics ===
After Yamina failed to win Knesset seats in the 2022 Israeli legislative election, Shaked as party leader decided to retire from politics. By January 2023, she has taken a position heading Kardan Real Estate Group.

In June 2026, ahead of the 2026 election, there were reports that Shaked is discussing cooperation with Yuli Edelstein and religious community figures for founding a new party targeting dissatisfied right-wing voters. In July, Edelstein and Shaked discussed a potential alliance with Benny Gantz of Blue and White, but it fell apart due to disagreements over leadership. On 6 September, Shaked announced that she would not return to politics and run in the election, saying that she did not see a path for a "broad, cross-bloc government."

== Views and activism ==
=== Jewish identity and Israeli democracy ===
Referencing the Knesset's basic law that Israel will be a Jewish and democratic state, Shaked opposes the view that the two values are in any way incompatible, arguing that "alongside the view that there is a constant struggle and a clash of civilizations between 'Jewish' and 'democratic,' I believe we can propose another model."

Shaked argues that the key of concepts of property rights, the rejection of the divine right of kings, the importance of the separation of powers, and civil liberty are a byproduct of the Jewish philosophical tradition. She states: "On what did Locke base the right to property if not the chapters on creation? After all, Locke's Second Treatise of Government is inspired by a close textual reading of The Book of Genesis." She concludes that it was "not primarily Roman law or the democratic tradition of the Athenian polis that shaped and forged the modern democratic tradition in Europe or the United States, but Jewish tradition—joined, of course, by other traditions." She proposes that "it is precisely when we wish to promote advanced processes of democratization in Israel that we must deepen its Jewish identity. These identities clearly do not contradict each other; on the contrary, I believe that they strengthen each other."

=== Zionism ===
In a controversial 2017 speech to the Israel Bar Association, Shaked stated that the Israeli judicial branch operates as if in a "dream", adopting a "utopian and universal worldview... Only a moral and political revolution of the magnitude of the revolution we saw in the 90s, but one reaffirming the accomplishments of Zionism and its unchanging positions may turn this problematic tide." She argued that the Basic Law proposal: Israel as the Nation-State of the Jewish People, of which she is an advocate and architect, will lead to a "moral and political revolution in Israel... It's a call to rouse from this dream. It's an overall perception bringing back the principles of our founding fathers to the forefront of the law. It moves Zionism and the deepest and most basic components of our identity from the blind spot it currently occupies in the judicial realm to its rightful place: under the spotlight." Shaked states that "Individual rights are almost sacred to me, but not devoid of context, not when cut off from our Israeli uniqueness, our national missions, our history, and our Zionist challenges."

=== Family unification of Arab-Israelis and Palestinians ===
In 2022, Shaked suggested renewing citizenship legislation that had expired in July 2021 after the Knesset failed to renew it. She sponsored a bill proposing to prevent Palestinian family unification (residency for Palestinian citizens married to Israeli citizens). She cited security concerns and "demographic reasons", and added that it was meant to stop the "creeping right of return". The bill was blocked after Meretz filed an objection, sending the bill back to the cabinet for further appraisal.

=== Israeli judiciary ===
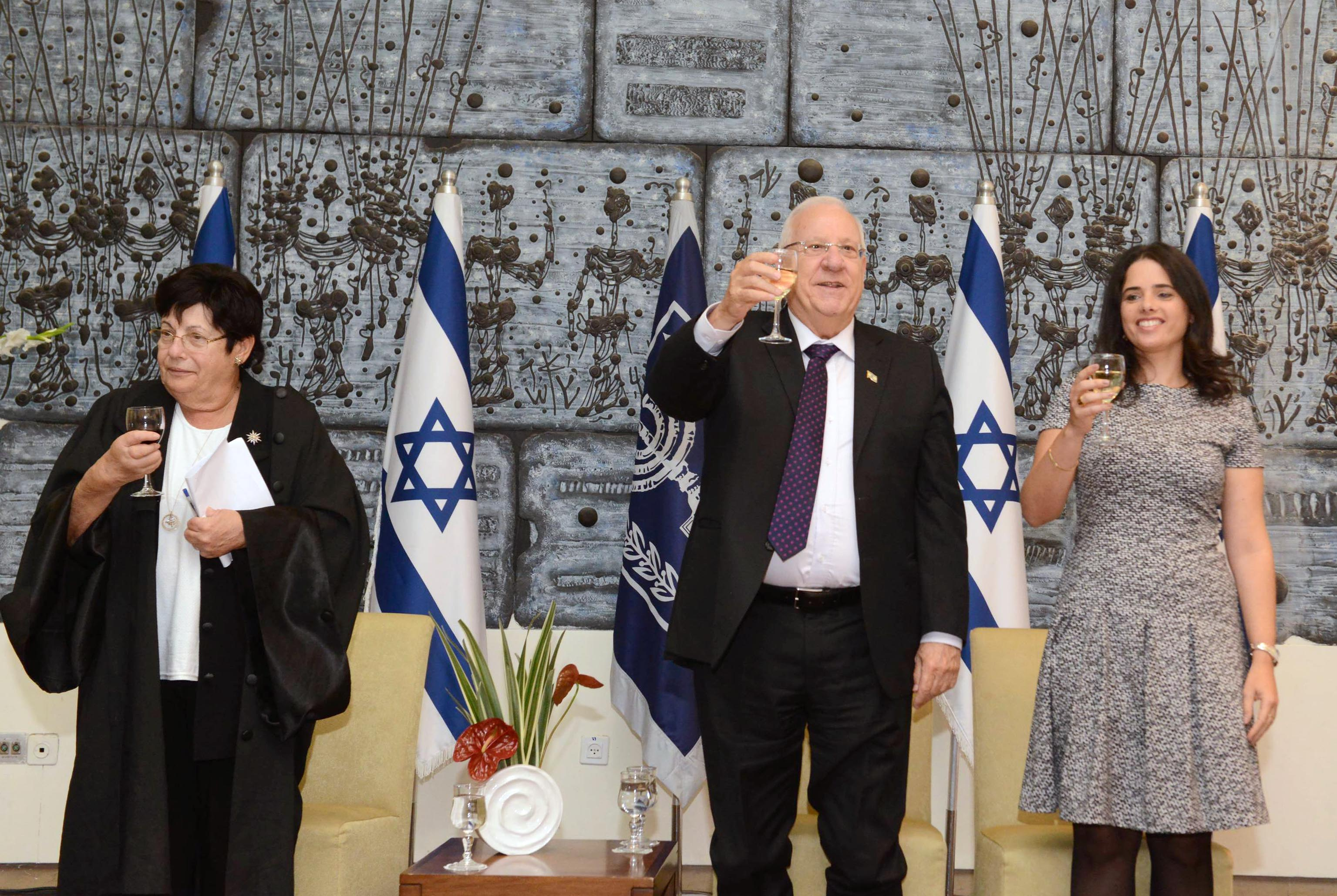
Shaked (right) with Israeli president Reuven Rivlin (centre) and Israeli judge Miriam Naor (left), 15 October 2015

Shaked seeks to limit the power of the Israeli judiciary. She argues that the role of the judiciary needs to be delineated and restricted, saying: "Is it still correct to say of the judiciary in Israel what Alexander Hamilton said about the court that he knew, that it 'has no influence over either the sword or the purse'? Is it really true that the judiciary in Israel has 'no direction either of the strength or of the wealth of the society'? To my mind, this is very doubtful. In fact, it is inconceivable to me that a judicial body that bears no responsibility for filling the purse permits itself to empty it, but unfortunately, this is the situation in Israel today ... The new tracks that I seek to lay—carefully, while protecting the independence and dignity of the court—are meant to define more precisely the routes of each of the branches, legislative, executive, and judicial, and thus to enable regular traffic and prevent future collisions".

She writes, referencing the arguments of Alexis de Tocqueville, that the long-term damage of normalizing judicial intervention has to be distinguished from the justness of any particular legal decision, stating: "[O]nly a person with real patience who knows that the advantage of democratic government lies not in its immunity from errors, but in the fact that its errors can be corrected in the long term ... only a person like this could understand the enormous benefits of long-term governance power and what de Tocqueville meant when he spoke of the healthy influence of the government's ability to govern effectively. Tocqueville's words must be borne in mind as we lay the new tracks regulating the relations between the Supreme Court and the other branches of government. The healthy influence of governance emerges in ways that are not obvious, and certainly not in a brief focused glance, which misses the aggregate damages caused when the court repeatedly strikes down the products of the government and the Knesset". Shaked concludes that the judicial system must "give enough power and leeway to elected officials while minimizing the harm to the individual and giving maximum consideration to the individual's freedom to shape his life as he wishes".

Sometimes nicknamed the "Iron Lady" because of her intransigence in repressing crimes committed by Palestinians, as well as for her nationalist positions, she supports the death penalty for individuals who have committed terrorist acts, including for Jews who killed Palestinians; however, she considers that the death penalty should only apply in the most extreme cases.

=== Economic policy ===
Shaked argues that the Israeli economy is insufficiently capitalistic. As part of a 20-page treatise she wrote in an academic law journal in 2016 on the structure of the Israeli legal system, she argues that the Israeli economy is suffering from massive over-regulation and that the fight to de-regulate the economy is a constant uphill battle.

"The state's ability to finance its services depends first and foremost on the value and profit created by entrepreneurs, by the great industrialists, by the various employers, and by the workers. Yet regulation, so beloved of lawmakers, is strangling them and placing the country's growth in grave danger... [T]he cumulative wisdom of the masses will always be greater than that of the state's experts, that the popular mechanisms will always be more flexible, faster, more responsive, and more adaptable than the mechanisms of the state. The law, therefore, must attempt to reflect these mechanisms and not try to create more successful alternatives... The railroad tracks of legislation to which we have become accustomed lead to an erosion of citizens' liberty and a series of restrictions on the economy by increasing the Knesset's ability to criminalize various acts. In labor law, between 2011 and 2013, in an 18-month period, 60 new criminal offenses were added which an employer could be accused of as a result of actions carried out during his business activities. And this is far from being all: in environmental protection, within 24 months, 65 new criminal offenses were added. Overall, the numbers are alarming... The areas of freedom in this world, which create the enormous wealth we enjoy, would be more and more reduced because of a government apparatus".

==== Opposition to executive pay limits ====
Shaked opposes the imposition of limits on executive pay. She argues that limiting executive pay means that "banks and pension funds... are having trouble finding talented managers interested in being company officers. Good senior managers are looking for new directions, and are seeking to join other sectors to which the law does not apply, I'm asking you to refrain from enacting legislation where it is not needed. Unnecessary legislation is harmful legislation. It harms the economy on a macro scale and the individual on a micro-scale".

=== Support for Kurdish independence ===
Shaked has repeatedly stressed her support for an independent Kurdistan. Shaked said, as the Sykes-Picot Agreement breaks apart, that "the greatest opportunity that stands before us could come from strengthening the connections with the Kurdish nation". Shaked said that "the Jewish and Kurdish nations share a history... of mutual respect, mutual interests", including fighting Islamic State. Shaked has additionally cited the high number of women serving in Kurdish armed forces.

=== Support for cannabis decriminalization ===
Shaked supports and has legislated for the decriminalization of cannabis consumption in Israel. In 2017, as Minister of Justice, Shaked submitted legislation to decriminalize the recreational use of cannabis. On successfully passing the legislation, Shaked said: "Whether one supports use of cannabis or is opposed, it is wrong to judge cannabis users per criminal law and its derivatives".

== Personal life ==
Shaked is married to Ofir Shaked, a former fighter pilot in the Israeli Air Force. They have two children and live in Bavli, Tel Aviv. She is an admirer of Steve Jobs. She was influenced by Ayn Rand, in particular The Fountainhead and Atlas Shrugged. She describes her personality as "intellectual" and "systematic".

== Awards and recognition ==
- In 2012, Shaked won the Abramowitz Israeli Prize for Media Criticism.
- In 2012, Shaked was included in the Globes list of the 50 most influential women.
- In 2013, Shaked ranked 1st (with Shelly Yachimovich) as outstanding Knesset Member for the summer session by the Knesset Channel.
- In 2014, Shaked ranked second as outstanding Knesset Member for the winter session by the Knesset Channel.
- In 2015, The Jerusalem Post ranked Shaked as the 33rd most prominent Jewish person in the world.
- In 2015, the magazine Forbes Israel ranked Shaked as the fifth most prominent woman in Israel.
- In 2015, Shaked was elected as "Woman of the Year" in Israel by Lady Globes magazine.
- In 2016, Shaked was ranked as the sixth most influential person in Israel, by Maariv.
- In 2017, Shaked was chosen as "Woman of the Year" and "Israel's most influential woman", by Forbes Israel.
- In 2017, Shaked was chosen as "Israel's Most Influential Woman", by Globes.
- In 2018, Shaked was chosen as "Israel's Most Influential Woman" by Forbes Israel for the second year in a row.
