= Norwegian Law (Israel) =

Israeli Basic Law allowing ministers and deputy ministers to resign from the Knesset

The Norwegian Law (Hebrew: החוק הנורווגי), initially Mini-Norwegian Law (Hebrew: החוק הנורווגי הקטן) for its first version, is a name given to an amendment to Article 42c of the Basic Law: The Knesset. The law allows ministers or deputy ministers to resign from the Knesset and, upon resigning their ministerial post, return to the Knesset. Upon their resignation from the Knesset, the next member on the party's list enters the Knesset, and upon their return of the Knesset, the member with the lowest order on the party's list leaves the Knesset. The legislation became known as the "Norwegian Law", due to a similar provision in Article 62 of the Constitution of Norway, requiring a member of the Storting to resign their seat and be replaced by a deputy. This system of dualism, separating the cabinet and the legislature, also exists in Netherlands, Belgium, Sweden, Portugal, Estonia, and other countries.

== History ==
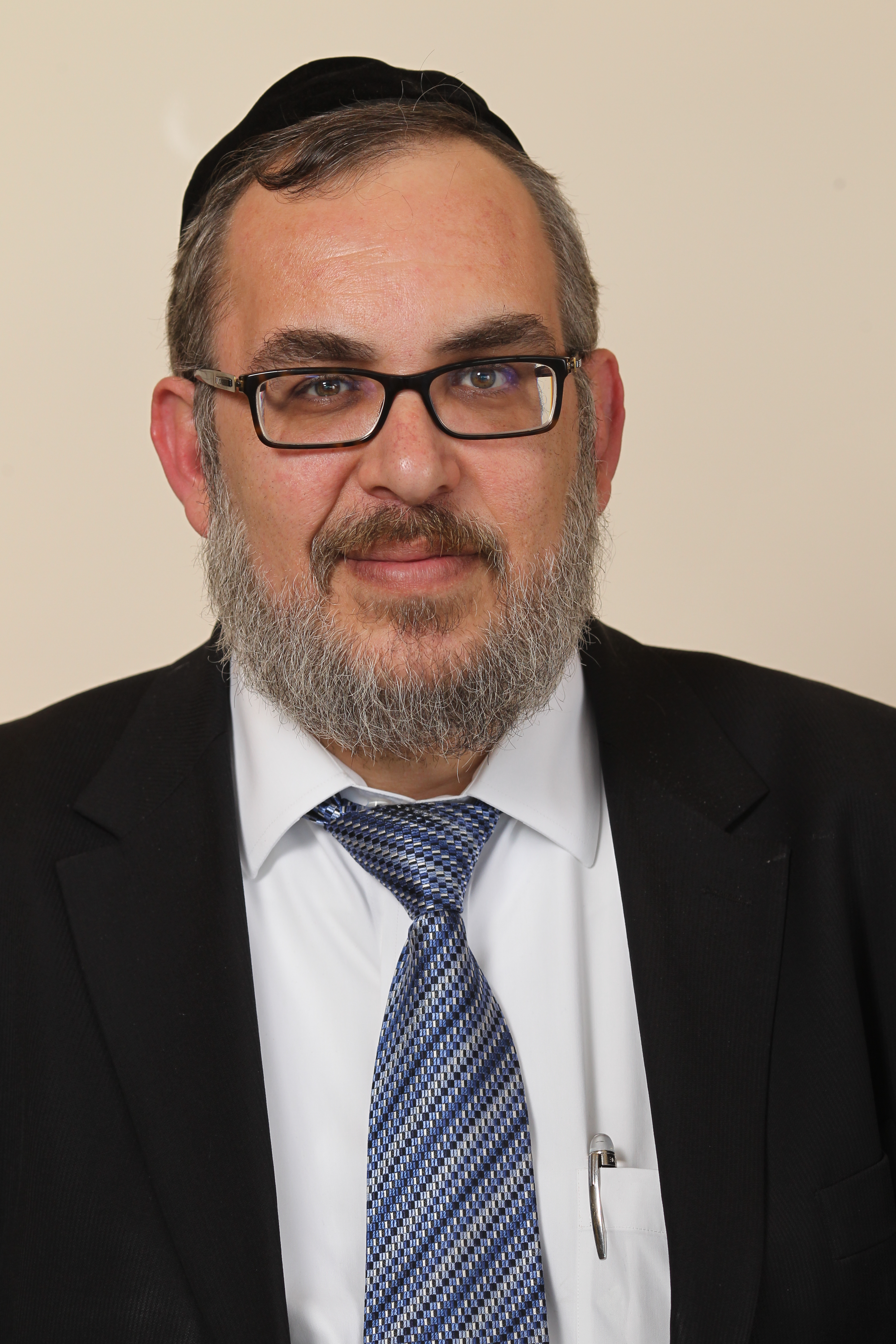
MK Ya'akov Asher of Degel HaTorah, the original proponent of the law

The concept was originally promoted by the Degel HaTorah faction of United Torah Judaism. UTJ had dropped from seven seats to six in the 2015 election, so Degel MK Ya'akov Asher lost his seat, leaving the faction with only two of the six. The faction wanted then-Deputy Education Minister Meir Porush of Agudat Yisrael to resign, so Asher could replace him as next on the list. The original version of the law was approved by the Knesset by a vote of 64–51 on 30 July 2015, and limited each party to one resignation and replacement at a time. It was implemented due to the fact that many cabinets had so many ministers who were restricted in their Knesset functions (as they could not serve on committees, as officers or propose legislation) that it became an issue. The law also alleviated concerns about separation of powers.

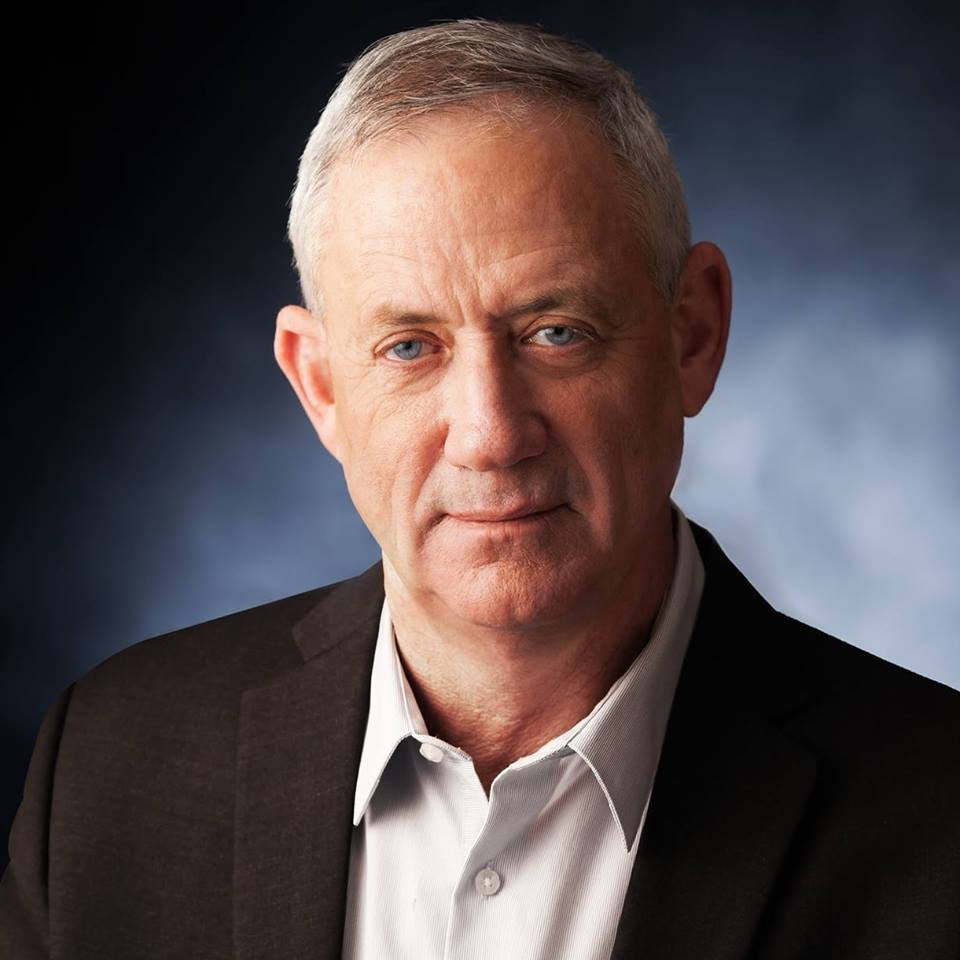
Benny Gantz, who proposed an expansion to the law in 2020

An expanded version of the law was passed on 15 June 2020 by a vote of 66–43 and became part of the Basic Law, and allowed all ministers, except the Prime Minister, to resign and be replaced. The change was promoted by Benny Gantz because most of his Blue and White MKs are ministers and deputies, and cannot also serve on Knesset committees or day-to-day operations.

The law was further expanded in January 2023, after the 2022 election, and passed 65 to 18. The expansion allows smaller parties with less than four MKs to use of the law, so they can replace half of their ministers. Parties sized between four and eighteen retained the same limits, and parties of over eighteen MKs can replace one-third of their ministers, instead of the original five. The Knesset Department of Budget Control found it would cost NIS 1.95 million per new MK.

== Process ==
Maximum number of replacements by party size
Party size (MKs)	Max num of replacements
< 4	$50%$ of party size
4–6	3
7–9	4
10–17	5
>17	$33.3\bar{3}%$ of party size

The law cannot be activated until the formation of a government, nor within 90 days before an election. A minister resigns their Knesset seat by providing a written notice to the Speaker of the Knesset. The resignation goes into effect two days later (excluding holidays). The minister is replaced by the next person on the party's list. Splitting or merging a party does not impact any existing application of the law. If the minister leaves the cabinet, they are able to return to the Knesset and take their seat back from their replacement. The minister and the replacement inform the Speaker in a joint written notice of their intent to return. The prime minister, deputy prime minister, alternate prime minister, and acting prime minister may not make use of the law.

== Analysis ==
Yesh Atid leader Yair Lapid criticized the law as for its high costs, NIS 20 million per year in 2020. Since then, costs reached NIS 35 million in 2022. Assaf Shapira, a fellow of the Israel Democracy Institute criticized that the law disconnects constituents from ministers, because they are no longer MKs. Shapira also raised concerns that the replacement MKs might not be able to express as much criticism of the government, due to the fleeting status of their seats. Overall, he says the law is essential and advantageous because it allows ministers and Knesset to function. He advocates implementing a mandate that all ministers resign their seats, or expanding the Knesset and repealing the law. Hadash-Ta'al MK Aida Touma-Suleiman criticized the law for disconnecting the ministers from the Knesset, since they stop attending the plenary session, and it becomes difficult to communicate. Yesh Atid MK Yoav Segalovitz served as a deputy minister and preferred to retain his seat to "provide a quick response to inquiries and the interaction has helped to understand things differently."

== See also ==
- Ministerial by-elections
- Replacements during the twentieth Knesset
- Replacements during the twenty-third Knesset
- Replacements during the twenty-fourth Knesset
