= 2008 The Jewish Home leadership election =

- 8 December 2008
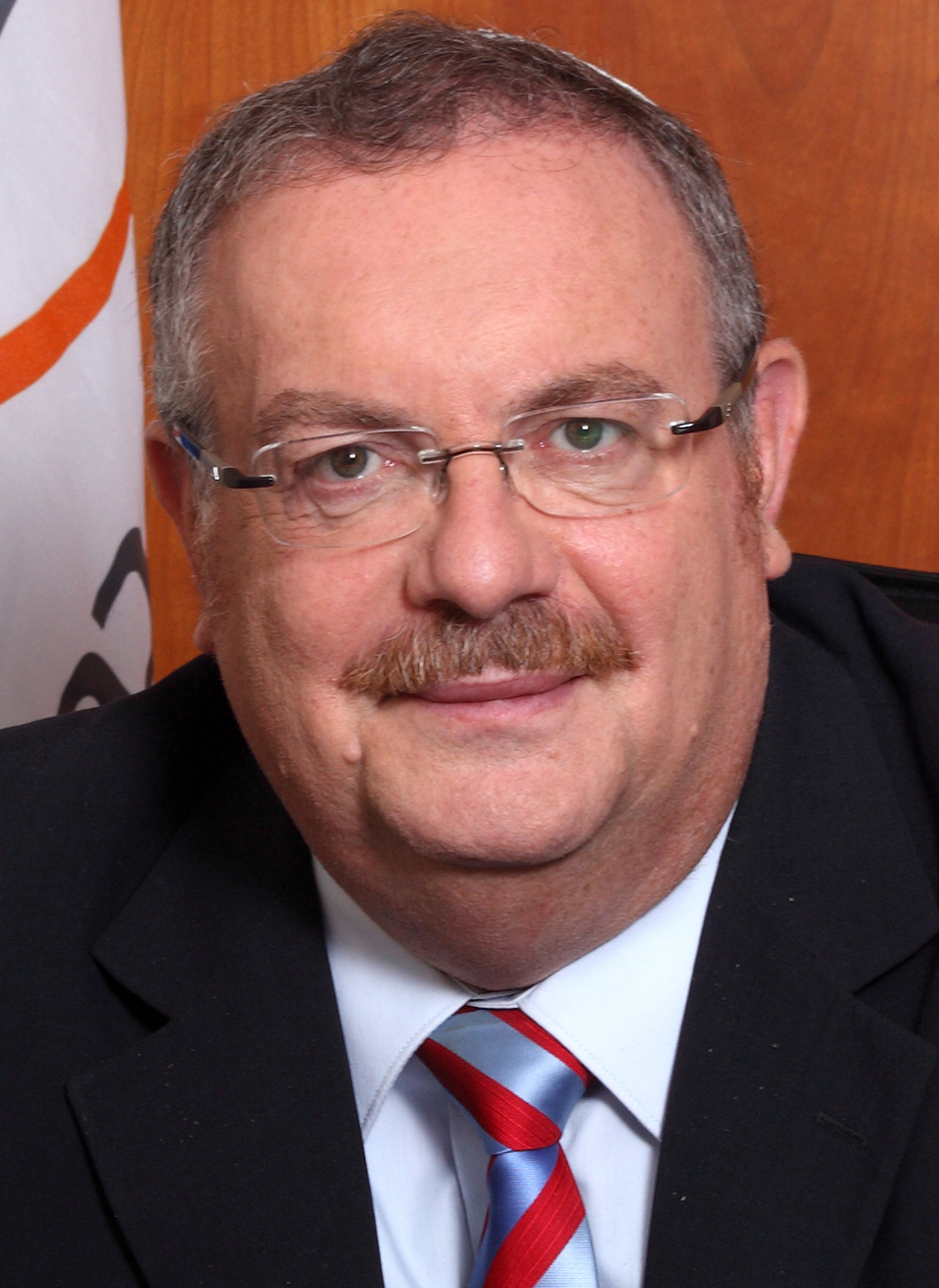
Candidate	Daniel Hershkowitz
Party	Jewish Home
Elected Leader
Daniel Hershkowitz

The 2008 The Jewish Home leadership election was held on 8 December 2008 to elect the inaugural leader of the newly formed The Jewish Home party. Daniel Hershkowitz was elected as leader.

== Background ==
The Jewish Home formed in November 2008 as a merger of the National Religious Party, Moledet, and the offshoot National-religious wing of Religious Zionist Party.

== Candidates ==
Ran

- Eli Ben-Dahan, rabbi and administrative head of the rabbinic courts
- Daniel Hershkowitz, rabbi and mathematics professor
- Avi Wartzman, rabbi and educator

Declined to run

- Yaakov Amidror, former major general

== Election ==
Major General Yaakov Amidror declined calls to serve as the party's leader. Instead, he served as chairman of the party committee in which the leadership vote was held on December 8. Other members of the committee included Asher Cohen. The council opted for Hershkowitz instead of figures who were already nationally established in hopes of having a fresh face so that they could launch the new party with a fresh image.

The day after the leadership vote, the same party council selected the candidates for the party's electoral list in the forthcoming Knesset elections.
