= Avi Wortzman =

Israeli politician (born 1970)

- אבי וורצמן
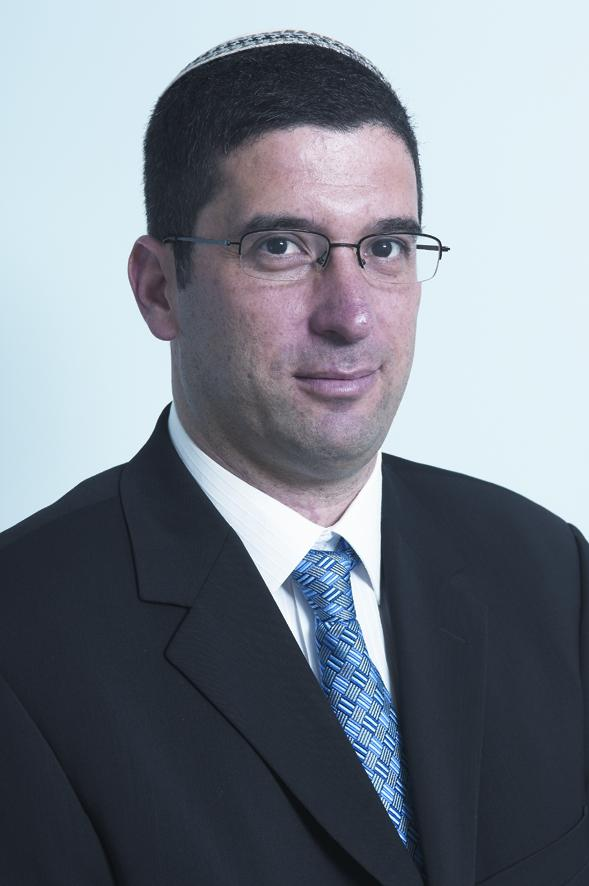

Ministerial roles
- 2013–2015: Deputy Minister of Education

Faction represented in the Knesset
- 2013–2015: The Jewish Home
- 2015: The Jewish Home

Personal details
- Born: 29 October 1970 (age 55) Beersheba, Israel

Avraham "Avi" Wortzman (Hebrew: אבי וורצמן; born 29 October 1970) is an Israeli politician and a former member of the Knesset for the Jewish Home. He also served as Deputy Minister of Education between 2013 and 2015.

== Biography ==
Wortzman was born in Beersheba. He studied at the Bnei Akiva-affiliated Ohel Shlomo yeshiva in Beersheba and the Mercaz HaRav Kook yeshiva in Jerusalem. During his national service in the IDF he served in the Givati Brigade, and was also based at the Hesder Yeshivat Or Etzion.

After his army service he returned to Beersheba and founded the Beit Moria Garin Torani in 1993, which worked in the education sector.

In 2008 Wortzman headed the United Religious List in the municipal elections in Beersheba, with the party winning three seats. He served as the deputy mayor of the city and was responsible for community and welfare.

In 2008 he was a candidate for the leadership of the new Jewish Home party, but was defeated by Daniel Hershkowitz. Prior to the 2013 Knesset elections he was asked by Naftali Bennett to run for the Knesset, and was placed eighth on the Jewish Home list. He entered the Knesset after the party won 12 seats, and was appointed Deputy Minister of Education on 18 March, a position he held until 4 December 2014. He was placed tenth on the Jewish Home list for the 2015 elections, but lost his seat as the party was reduced to eight seats.

Although he returned to the Knesset on 3 December 2015 as a replacement for Yinon Magal, who resigned because of sexual harassment allegations against him, he lost his seat three days later after deciding to remain in his job at Aleh Negev, a choice that causes Bennett to resign as minister, which automatically caused him to return to the Knesset due to a recent law amendment and put Wortzman back to the top of the candidate list.

Wortzman is married to Ilanit and the couple has four children.
