= 2017 The Jewish Home leadership election =

- 27 April 2017
- Turnout: 51.09%
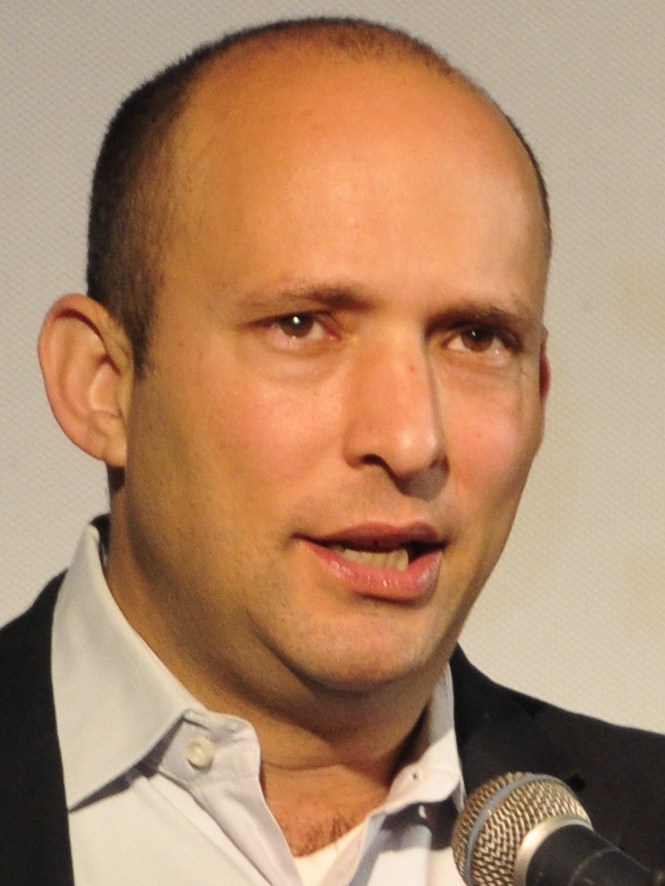

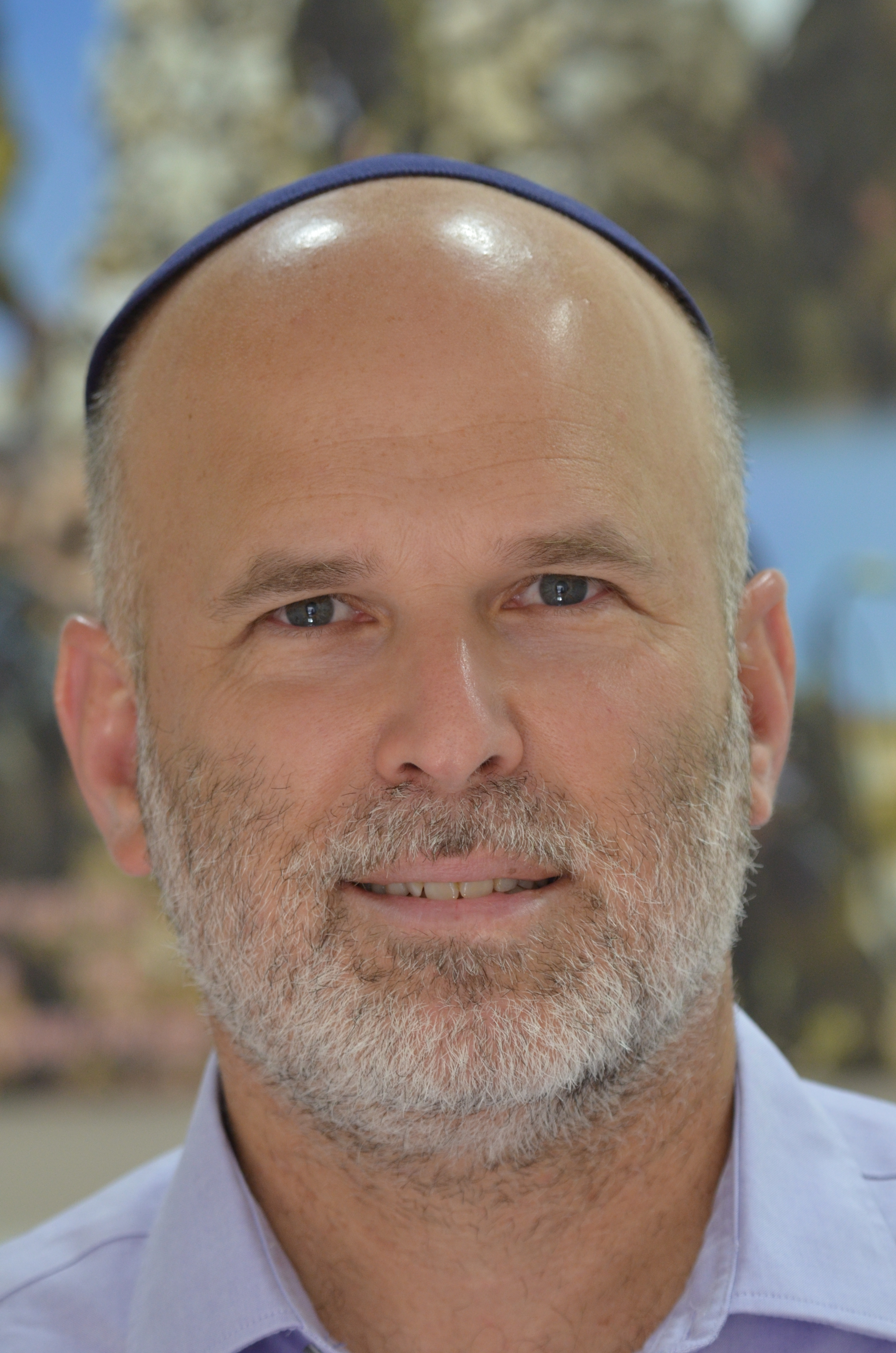

Candidate	Naftali Bennett	Yonatan Branksi	Yitzhak Zagha
Party	Jewish Home	Jewish Home	Jewish Home
Popular vote	12,600	1,916	1,074
Percentage	80.25%	12.20%	6.84%
Leader before election
Naftali Bennett
Elected Leader
Naftali Bennett

The 2017 The Jewish Home leadership election was held on 27 April 2017 to elect the leader of The Jewish Home party. Incumbent leader Naftali Bennett won a strong reelection over two challengers.

== Background ==
Bennett was first elected party leader in 2012 and was reelected in 2015.

In the 2013 Israeli legislative election, Bennett led the party to its strongest showing, with twelve Knesset seats. However, in 2015 (after Bennett was reelected party leader), the party lost seats, falling to eight seats. Ahead of the 2017 leadership election, polls showed the party receiving ten seats in future elections. The party was seen by many as underperforming compared to how it had originally been expected to perform under Bennett's leadership.

At the time of the leadership election, the next legislative election was not expected to occur until 2019. However, facing prospective leadership challenges, on 8 March 2017 Bennett scheduled for an early leadership election. One speculated reason for holding the leadership election early was that it would give any opponents only about two months to field their campaigns. Another speculated reason was that it could provide Benett a legal excuse to politically fundraise. Another speculated reason was that it would make a political statement that the party was anticipating that Prime Minister Benjamin Netanyahu would be ousted from power due to criminal investigations, thereby necessitating an early Knesset election.

== Candidates ==
- Naftali Bennett, incumbent party leader
- Yonatan Branski, former Israel Defense Forces colonel
- Yitzhak Zagha, rabbi and leader of the Spirit of Jerusalem

== Campaign ==
Both of Bennett's challengers positioned themselves further to the political right than Bennett. They were characterized by The Times of Israel as "hard right".

By the time of the vote, Bennett was widely expected to win reelection as leader.

== Electorate ==
The party's 30,734 members were eligible to vote at 69 polling stations located across the nation.

== Results ==
Turnout was low, which some attributed to the overwhelming expectation that Bennett was going to win.

2017 The Jewish Home leadership election
Party	Candidate	Votes	%
Jewish Home	Naftali Bennett (incumbent)	12,600	80.25
Jewish Home	Yonatan Branksi	1,916	12.20
Jewish Home	Yitzhak Zagha	1,074	6.84
	Other	111	0.71
Total votes		15,701	100
Turnout			51.09
