= Nir Orbach =

Israeli politician

- ניר אורבך
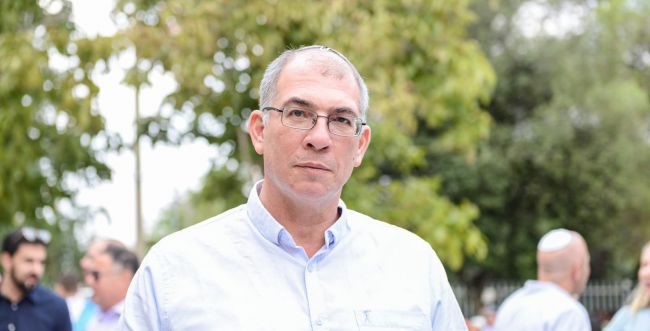
- Orbach in 2021

Faction represented in the Knesset
- 2021–2022: Yamina

Personal details
- Born: 6 April 1970 (age 56) Haifa, Israel

Nir Orbach (Hebrew: ניר אורבך; born 6 April 1970) is an Israeli politician. He was a member of the Knesset for the Yamina party from 2021 to 2022.

== Biography ==
Orbach worked as a parliamentary assistant to Effi Eitam and Nissan Slomiansky. He later became director of the Jewish Home party and was eleventh on its list for the 2015 elections, but failed to enter the Knesset as the party won eight seats.

In January 2021, he ran for the party leadership, but lost to Hagit Moshe by 472 votes to 369. He subsequently left the party and joined Yamina's list for the March 2021 elections. Placed sixth on the Yamina list, he was elected to the Knesset as the party won seven seats.

During the formation of the Bennett-Lapid "change" government, Orbach publicly announced that he would consider voting against it in the Knesset. During the negotiations at the Kfar Maccabiah Hotel, rival protests were being held outside by supporters of the Bennett-Lapid deal and by right-wing activists who oppose the "change government". One of the protesters who opposed the possible new government addressed the others and called for Orbach's house in Petah Tikva to be burned, should he vote in favor of the coalition deal. Another message invited Orbach to attend his own funeral and accused him of "[supporting] a government that harmed Shabbat and Torah study and brought Reform [Jews] and assimilation to the Holy Land." Orbach also considered resigning from the Knesset rather than voting for the coalition, though this would have allowed Shirly Pinto, a strong supporter of the coalition, to take his seat. Ultimately, Orbach chose to retain his seat in the Knesset and vote for the unity government, arguing it was necessary to "end the stalemate in Israeli politics".

Orbach quit the coalition government in June 2022, reducing it to a minority of 59 seats in the Knesset. He blamed "extremist and anti-Zionist members" for his resignation. Orbach decided to temporarily step back from his political career in September 2022 and not contest the 2022 Knesset elections. He also stated that he would work to ensure that the next government was a right-wing one.
