= 2015 The Jewish Home leadership election =

- 14 January 2015
- Turnout: 57%
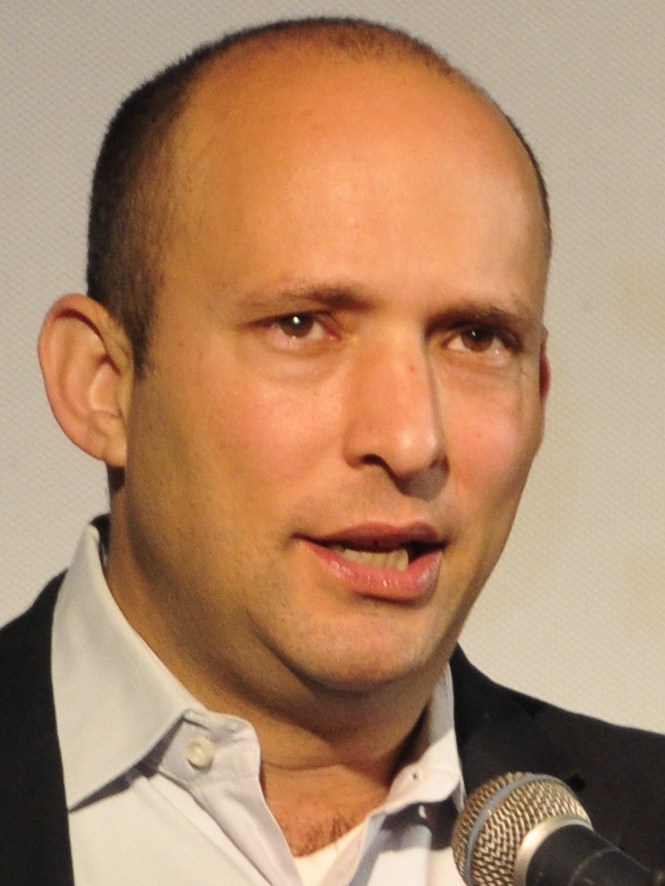

| Candidate | Naftali Bennett | Shimon Or |
| Party | Jewish Home | Jewish Home |
| Percentage | 90% | 10% |
Leader before election
Naftali Bennett
Elected Leader
Naftali Bennett

The 2015 The Jewish Home leadership election was held on 14 January 2015 to elect the leader of The Jewish Home party. The election took place in advance of the 2015 Israeli legislative election. Incumbent leader Naftali Bennett was handily reelected.

The election coincided with the primaries that determined the party's 2015 legislative election party list.

== Background ==
Bennett was first elected leader of The Jewish Home in 2012, defeating Member of the Knesset Zevulun Orlev. Following the primary, the party won 12 seats in the 2013 legislative election, with Bennett becoming the Minister for Economy. On 1 December 2014, the party scheduled elections for both the party leadership and its electoral list for 5 January. On 9 December, the party released a revised schedule, setting the election for 14 January. On 7 January 2015, a week before the election, rabbi Shimon Or announced his intention to challenge Bennett for the party leadership.

Bennett raised 1.2 Million NIS for his re-election between October 2014 and January 2015.

== Candidates ==
- Naftali Bennett, incumbent party leader
- Shimon Or, rabbi

== Results ==
2015 The Jewish Home leadership election
| Party | Candidate | Votes | % |
|---|---|---|---|
| Jewish Home | Naftali Bennett (incumbent) | | 90 |
| Jewish Home | Shimon Or | | 10 |
| Turnout | | | 57 |

== Aftermath ==
Bennett led the party until late 2018, when he left to co-found and lead The New Right. He later became the prime minister of Israel, serving from 2021 through 2022.
