= Orlev =

Orlev (Hebrew: אורלב) is a Hebrew surname. Notable people with the surname include:

- Uri Orlev (1931–2022), Israeli children's author and translator
- Zevulun Orlev (born 1945), Israeli politician, Knesset member, and Welfare and Social Services Minister of Israel
