= Union of Right-Wing Parties =

Israeli electoral alliance

Union of Right-wing Parties איחוד מפלגות הימין
- Leader: Rafi Peretz
- Founded: 21 February 2019
- Dissolved: 14 July 2020
- Headquarters: Airport City, Israel
- Ideology: Religious Zionism; Religious conservatism National conservatism Social conservatism Orthodox interests Settler interests Ultranationalism
- Political position: Far-right
- Religion: Orthodox Judaism
- National affiliation: Yamina (2019, 2020)
- Member parties: Jewish Home; National Union; Otzma Yehudit (2019)

Election symbol
- טב

Website
- hayemin.org

The Union of Right-wing Parties (Hebrew: איחוד מפלגות הימין, Ihud Miflagot HaYamin) was a short-lived electoral alliance of right-wing to far-right religious Zionist parties which included HaBayit HaYehudi, Otzma Yehudit, and Tkuma. The list was created ahead of the April 2019 Israeli legislative election after Benjamin Netanyahu, urged The Jewish Home to accept Otzma Yehudit and Tkuma as part of its list for the April election, to avoid loss of votes by the right-wing bloc and International Criminal Court arrest warrants for Israeli officials. The alliance gained five seats in the April election.

Otzma Yehudit left the union on 5 July 2019, citing disagreements with the party, such as the refusal of URWP members to resign to allow Itamar Ben-Gvir to become a Knesset member. In addition, Otzma was unwilling to leave Baruch Marzel and Benzi Gopstein off the electoral slate, as Rafi Peretz demanded.

For the September 2019 election, the URWP ran on a joint list, called Yamina, with the New Right, to get both to pass the 3.25% threshold to enter the Knesset, after the New Right failed to pass the threshold in the April election. The parties later split, though Yamina re-formed for the 2020 Israeli legislative election.

== Background ==
In January 2019, Tkuma and Otzma entered talks to form a joint list; however, the talks ultimately failed on 11 February 2019.

On 12 February 2019, Otzma Yehudit entered talks with the Jewish Home party to reach an agreement on a joint list.

On 15 February 2019, Tkuma and the Jewish Home party agreed to a form a list again, with Tkuma getting every other seat on the list.

On 19 February 2019, it was reported that negotiations between Otzma Yehudit and the Jewish Home were deadlocked.

On 20 February 2019, both Otzma Yehudit and the Jewish Home agreed to terms to form a list, after Netanyahu had promised the Jewish Home ministerial positions in exchange for uniting with Otzma Yehudit. In order to facilitate this deal, Netanyahu also gave Jewish Home candidate Eli Ben-Dahan a position on the Likud party list, and formed a surplus-vote agreement between Likud and the URWP.

The party attempted to get Yachad to join the technical list, but negotiations failed, due to the rabbi of Yachad, Rabbi Meir Mazuz, rejecting it, although Eli Yishai, the head of Yachad, has claimed that Aryeh Deri vetoed Yishai's potential ministerial appointment.

Otzma Yehudit announced on 25 June that it would leave the technical bloc over the refusal of the Jewish Home party to seat Itamar Ben-Gvir in the Knesset using the Norwegian law.

On 29 July 2019, the URWP and the New Right reached a final agreement on joint run, with the New Right's Ayelet Shaked leading the joint list, which is named Yamina.

On 15 September, two days before the election, Yamina filed a motion to split back to the New Right and Jewish Home–National Union. Shaked made a last ditch attempt to keep them together, without success.

== Controversy ==
Due to the Kahanist ideology of Otzma Yehudit, there was controversy surrounding Netanyahu attempting to get Otzma Yehudit to run on a list with the Jewish Home party, which led to it being condemned by the American Jewish Committee, the Anti-Defamation League, and the American Israel Public Affairs Committee. Yifat Erlich, who was formerly on the slate for The Jewish Home, left the party over the union with Otzma Yehudit.

Michael Ben-Ari, who was placed fifth on the URWP list as part of Otzma Yehudit, was banned from running for the Knesset on 17 March 2019 by the Supreme Court of Israel.

== Composition ==
Name	Ideology	Position	Leader	21st Knesset Results
The Jewish Home	Religious Zionism, Religious conservatism	Right-wing to far-right	Rafi Peretz	3 / 120
National Union	Religious Zionism, Ultranationalism	Right-wing to far-right	Bezalel Smotrich	2 / 120
Otzma Yehudit	Kahanism, Ultranationalism	Far-right	Itamar Ben-Gvir	0 / 120

== Leaders ==
Leader	Took office	Left office
Rafi Peretz	2019	2020

== Election results ==
Election	Leader	Votes	%	Seats	Status
April 2019	Rafi Peretz	159,468 (#8)	3.70%	5 / 120	Caretaker government

== Knesset members ==
Knesset term	Seats	Faction	Members
21st (2019)	3	The Jewish Home	Rafi Peretz, Moti Yogev, Idit Silman
21st (2019)	2	National Union	Bezalel Smotrich, Ofir Sofer
