= Hagit Moshe =

Israeli politician

- חגית משה
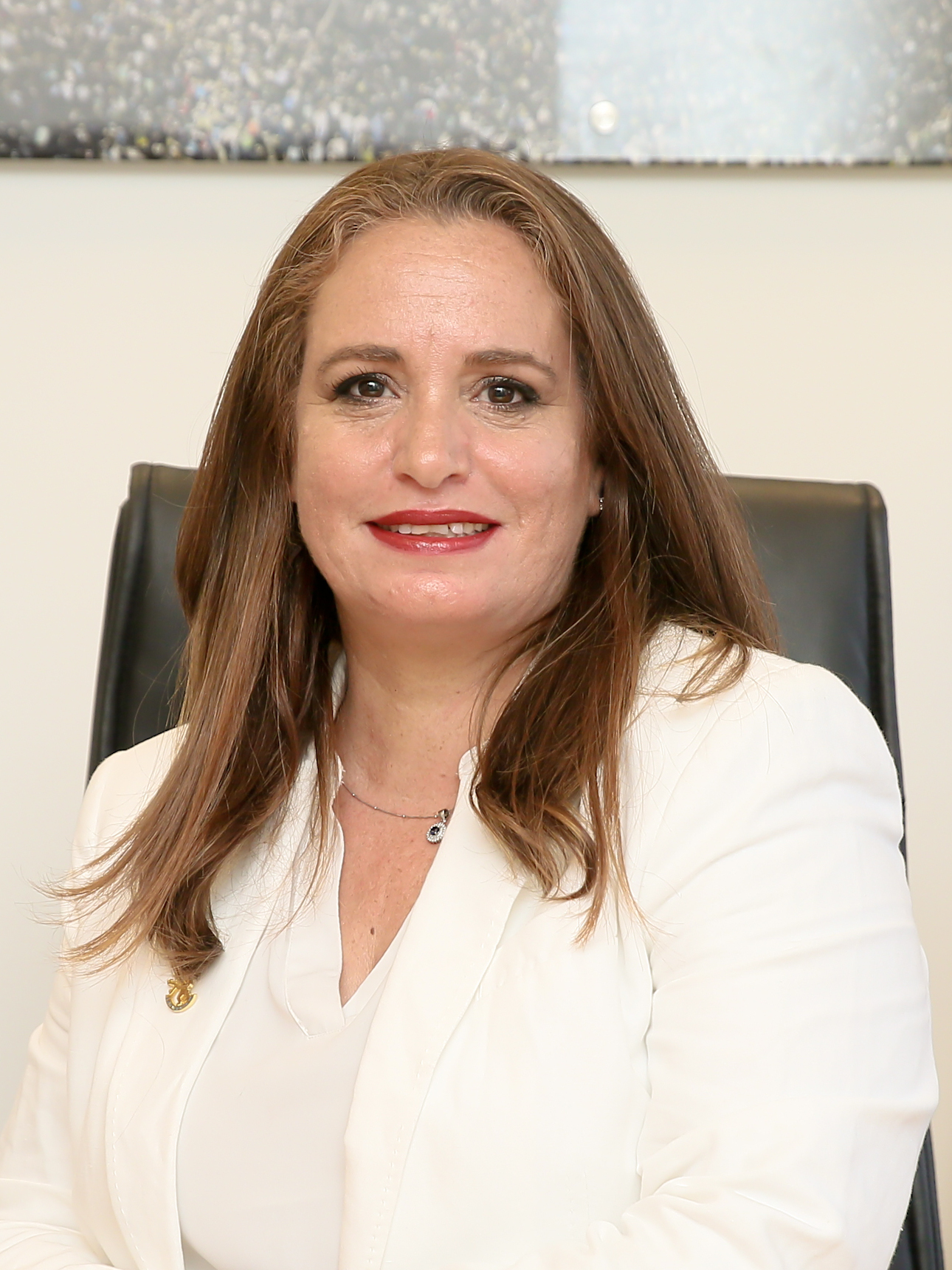
- Hagit Moshe in 2020

Deputy Mayor of Jerusalem
- Incumbent
- Assumed office 2016

Personal details
- Born: 14 April 1971 (age 55) Beersheba, Israel
- Party: Religious Zionist Party (since 2023)
- Other political affiliations: National Religious Party (1994–2008); The Jewish Home (2008–2023)
- Spouse: Itzik Moshe
- Children: 6
- Education: Touro College and University System; Lifshitz College of Education
- Occupation: Business administration teacher • Politician

Military service
- Branch/service: Israel Defense Forces
- Unit: C4I Corps
- Commands: Southern Command
- Battles/wars: Gulf War

Hagit Moshe (Hebrew: חגית משה; born 14 April 1971) is an Israeli politician, currently serving as a deputy mayor of Jerusalem. She served as the last chairperson of The Jewish Home party between 2021 and 2023.

== Political career ==
Moshe is the chairperson of The Jewish Home, and the first woman to serve in this capacity. She currently serves as a Deputy Mayor of Jerusalem, and holds the Education portfolio and the Communities and Young Families portfolio in the city.

In January 2021, after the retirement of Rabbi Rafi Peretz, Moshe ran for the leadership of the Jewish Home, at the urging of Prime Minister Benjamin Netanyahu. She received 472 votes, and defeated party secretary Nir Orbach.

In August 2023, The Jewish Home merged into the Religious Zionist Party, with Moshe becoming part of the party's management board. She helped campaign for the party during the 2024 Israeli municipal elections in Jerusalem.

== See also ==
- List of Israeli politicians

Political offices
Preceded by Rafi Peretz	Leader of the Jewish Home; 2021–present	Incumbent
