= Nissan Slomiansky =

Israeli politician

- ניסן סלומיאנסקי
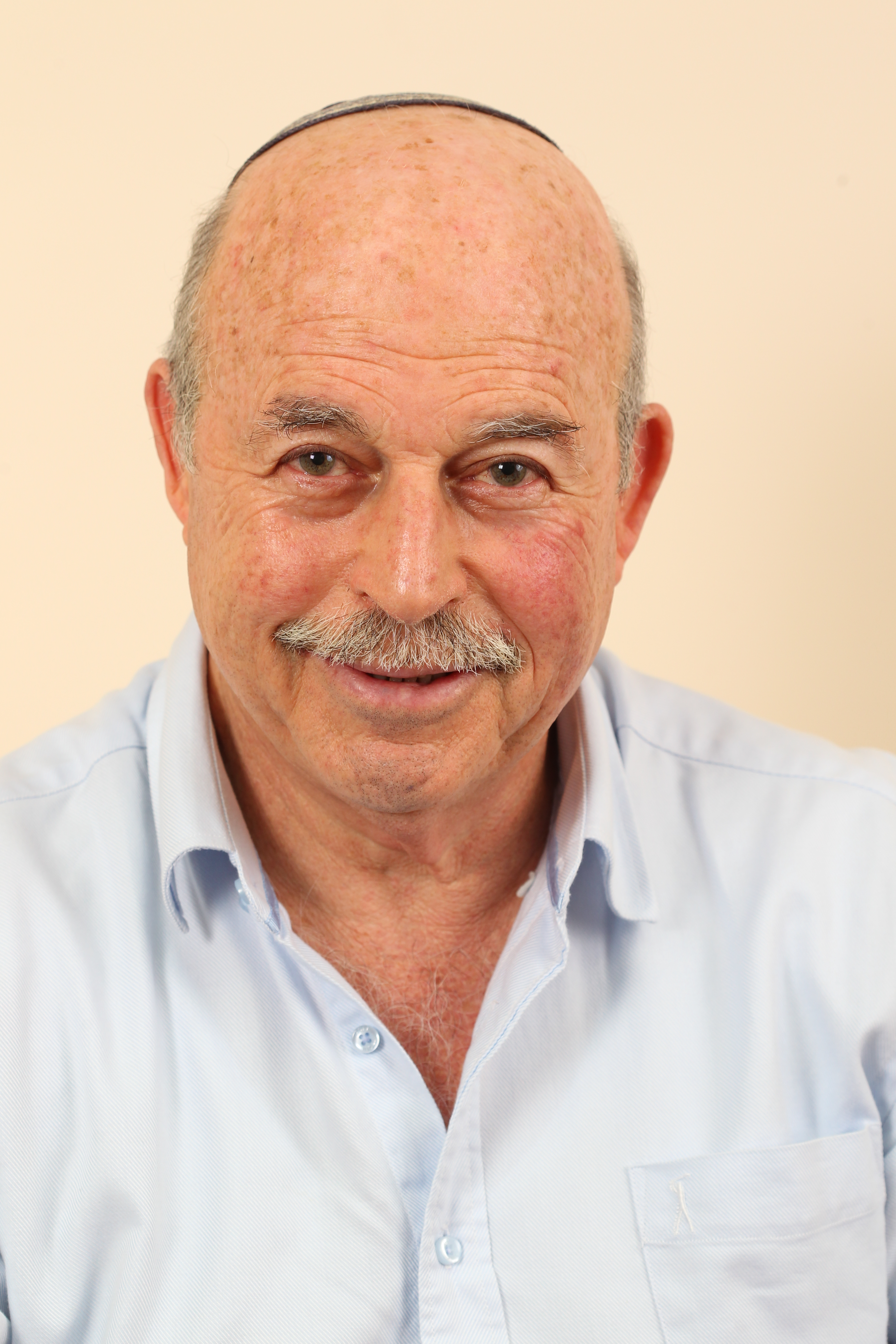

Faction represented in the Knesset
- 1996–1999: National Religious Party
- 2003–2009: National Religious Party
- 2013–2019: The Jewish Home

Personal details
- Born: 10 January 1946 (age 80) Ramat Gan, Mandatory Palestine

Nissan Slomiansky (Hebrew: ניסן סלומיאנסקי; born 10 January 1946) is an Israeli politician. He served as a member of the Knesset for the National Religious Party between 1996 and 1999, and again from 2003-2009, and was re-elected again in 2013, serving until 2019. He is a member of the Jewish Home party.

== Biography ==
Slomiansky was born in Ramat Gan during the Mandate era in the family, who migrated from the Second Polish Republic. He was educated at Bnei Akiva's yeshiva in Nechalim, and completed academic studies in physics and mathematics at Bar-Ilan University. He also studied in the Hesder Yeshivat Kerem B'Yavneh, where he was certified as a teacher and ordained as a Rabbi. After his studies, he enlisted to the Nahal Paratroopers unit and reached the rank of first lieutenant. Thereafter, he turned to politics, serving for more than two decades from 1977 to 1998 as the first head of Elkana local council. He was also the secretary-general of Gush Emunim.

In the 1996 elections, Slomiansky was placed 10th on the National Religious Party's list of candidates. He entered the Knesset in May 1997, following the death of Avraham Stern. He lost his seat in the 1999 elections, but regained it in 2003 when he was placed sixth on the party's list of candidates. He was later re-elected to the Seventeenth Knesset in 2006.

During the Sixteenth Knesset (2003-2006), Slomiansky headed the parliamentary lobby for elderly persons, and served as the chairperson of the party's Knesset caucus. For the 2009 elections, he won a fourth place on the Jewish Home list, but lost his seat when the party won only three seats. In the 2013 election, he was placed third on the Jewish Home list and was re-elected to Knesset. In 2011, he was appointed Vice President of the Lander Institute, replacing retired General Yaakov Amidror, who was appointed Head of the National Security Council.

Following allegations of sexual misconduct in December 2016, Slomiansky suspended himself from the chairmanship of the Knesset's Constitution, Law and Justice Committee. A police investigation into Slomiansky's conduct was closed in 2017 due to lack of evidence.

Slomiansky retired from political life in January 2019, and left the Knesset after the April 2019 election.

== Family ==
Slomiansky is married, and a father of five children.
