= Moti Yogev =

Israeli politician

- מוֹטִי יוֹגֵב
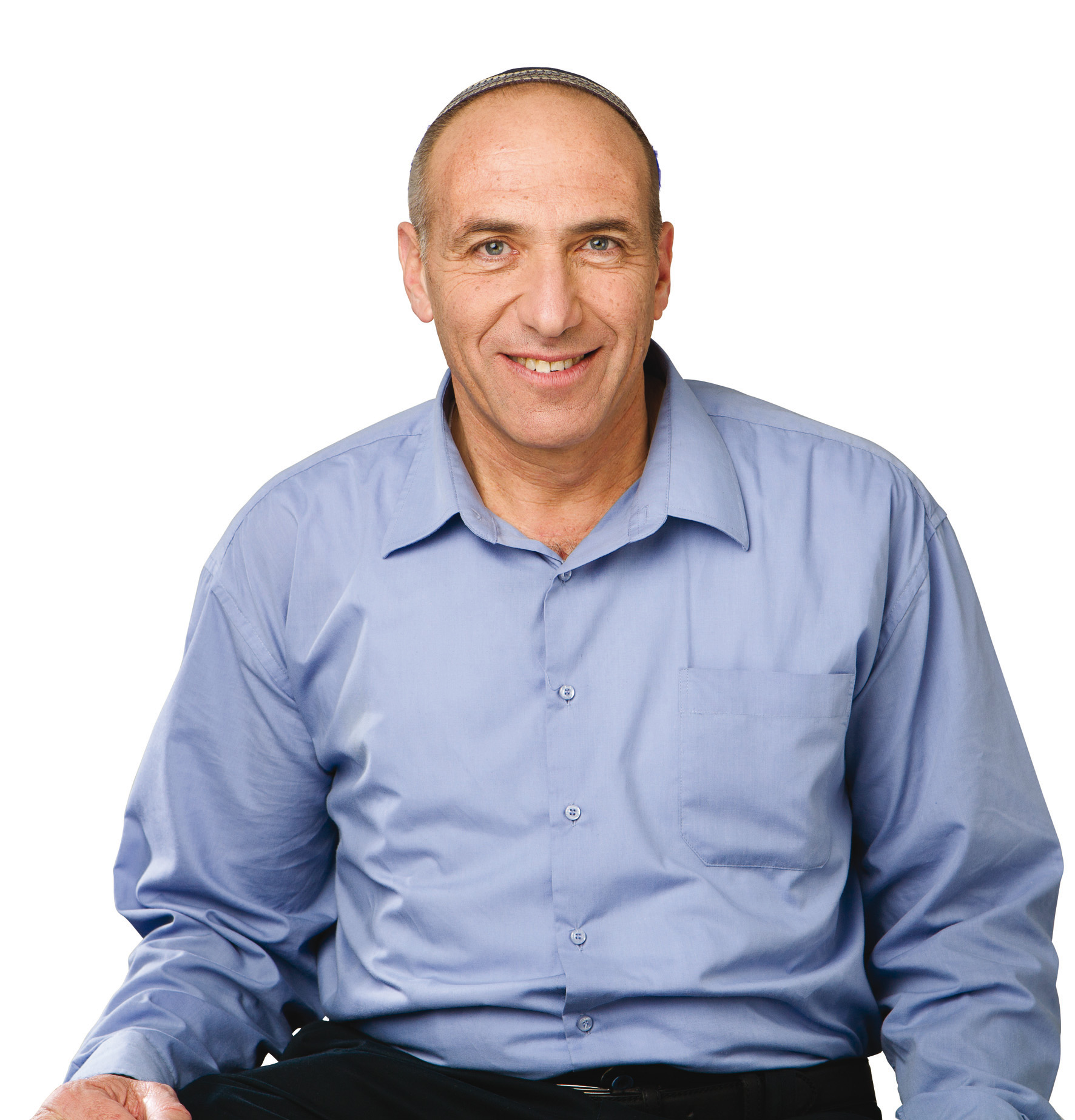

Faction represented in the Knesset
- 2013–2019: The Jewish Home
- 2019: Union of Right-Wing Parties
- 2019: Yamina
- 2019–2020: The Jewish Home–Tkuma

Personal details
- Born: 22 February 1956 (age 70) Haifa, Israel

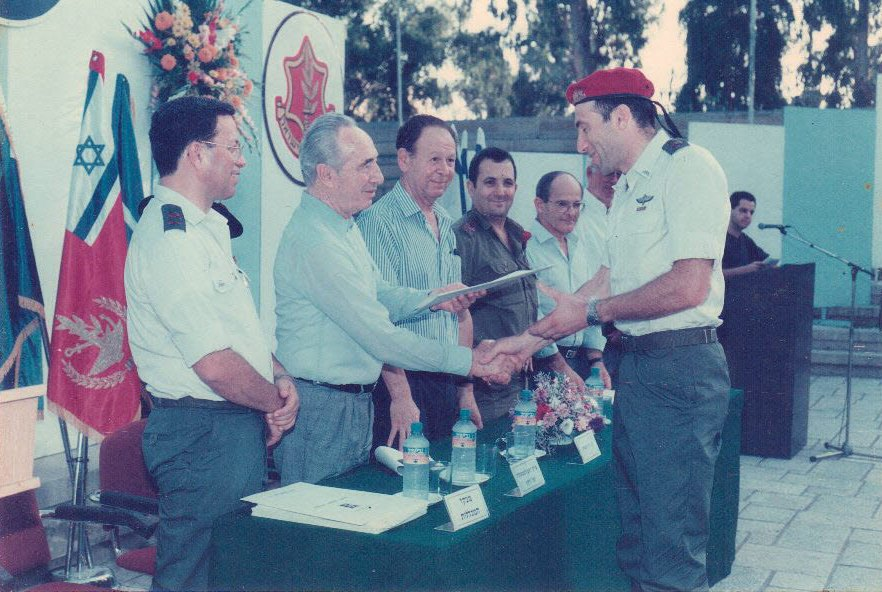
Yogev with Shimon Peres

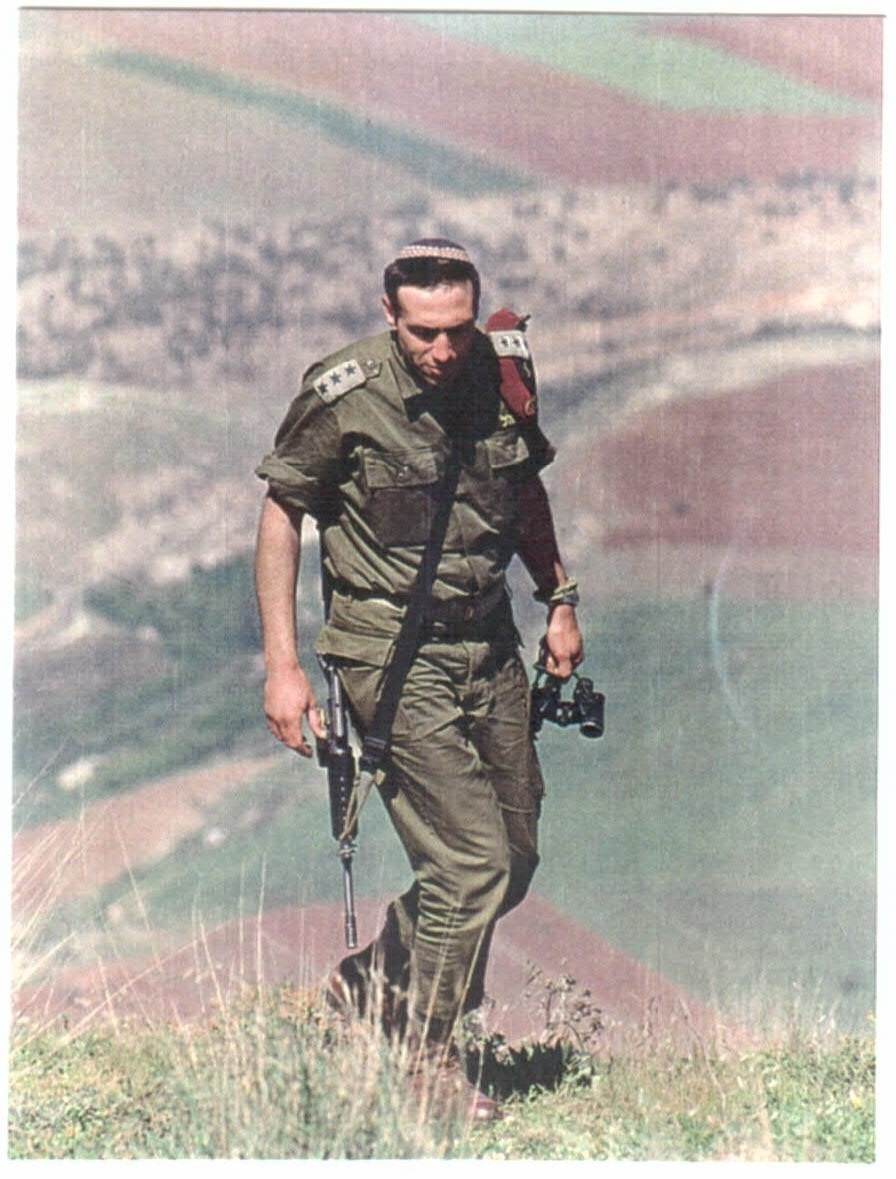
Yogev during his army service

Mordechai "Moti" Yogev (Hebrew: מָרְדְּכַי "מוֹטִי" יוֹגֵב; 22 February 1956) is a former IDF colonel and Israeli Jewish politician who served as a member of the Knesset for the Jewish Home between 2013 and 2020. He was formerly the Secretary General of Bnei Akiva, Chairman of the Company for the Reconstruction and Development of the Jewish Quarter, and Deputy and Acting Head of the Mateh Binyamin Regional Council.

Yogev was chair of the Subcommittee for Judea and Samaria of the Knesset Foreign Affairs and Defense Committee. He was a ranking member of this committee and its subcommittees: the Education, Culture, and Sports Committee, the Special Committee for the Rights of the Child, and the Committee for Immigration, Absorption, and Diaspora. He was chair of the Lobby for Jerusalem, the Lobby for Strengthening the North and Periphery, and the Lobby for Strengthening the Ethiopian Community.

Yogev announced on 15 January 2020 that he would be leaving politics after it was announced that he would be placed 11th on the Yamina list for the 2020 Israeli legislative election, while newcomer Sarah Beck was placed ahead of him. Yogev declared in response that the Jewish Home, as led by Rafi Peretz, had "lost its way."

== Biography ==
=== Early life and IDF service ===
Mordechai Vagenberg was born and raised in the Nave Shaanan neighbourhood in Haifa. He attended Rambam Elementary School in Haifa and then completed high school at the Bnei Akiva Kfar Haroeh Yeshiva. Upon enlistment in the IDF in 1974, Motti volunteered for Sayeret Shaked. He was trained as a combat soldier, infantry squad commander, and reconnaissance course. He then completed Infantry Officers Course and returned to Shaked as a company commander. He later served as commander of the 202nd Paratroopers Battalion, leading it during Operation Menorah.

Yogev was discharged from the IDF and studied for one year in Mercaz HaRav Yeshiva. He then returned to the IDF, where he served as the Sayeret Matkal training troop commander and participated in Operation Movil. He later fought with the unit in the Lebanon War and was again discharged from the IDF. After being contacted by GOC Central Command Amnon Lipkin-Shahak, he returned to the IDF as deputy commander of the 890th Battalion. He later served as commander of the 202nd Paratroopers Battalion, which he headed during combat in South Lebanon. Between 1988 and 1989, during the First Intifada, Yogev commanded the Maglan Unit and then the Efraim Brigade. Between 1992 and 1994, he served as an instructor in the IDF course for company and battalion commanders and as Chief of Staff of the Gaza Division in reserve duty. Yogev completed his IDF service with the rank of colonel.

=== Following IDF discharge ===
Following his discharge from the IDF in 2000, Yogev replaced Yonah Goodman as Secretary General of Bnei Akiva. In 2003, he was succeeded by Eitan Mor Yosef. Afterwards, for three years, Yogev volunteered as chairman of the board of directors of the Company for the Reconstruction and Development of the Jewish Quarter and as an alternate director in this capacity, Yogev was a member of the committee that chose the design for the coin commemorating the Hurva Synagogue.

In 2006, Yogev was attacked and injured during the attempted evacuation of Amona. Following his injury, he sued Officer Eyal Peri and was awarded NIS 156,000 in the settlement with the police. In 2008, Yogev was appointed deputy to the Head of the Mateh Binyamin Regional Council, Avi Roeh. The Council plenum unanimously approved Yogev's appointment to the position.

== Personal life ==
Yogev is married, with ten children, and lives in the Dolev settlement in the West Bank.
