= Shuli Mualem =

Israeli politician

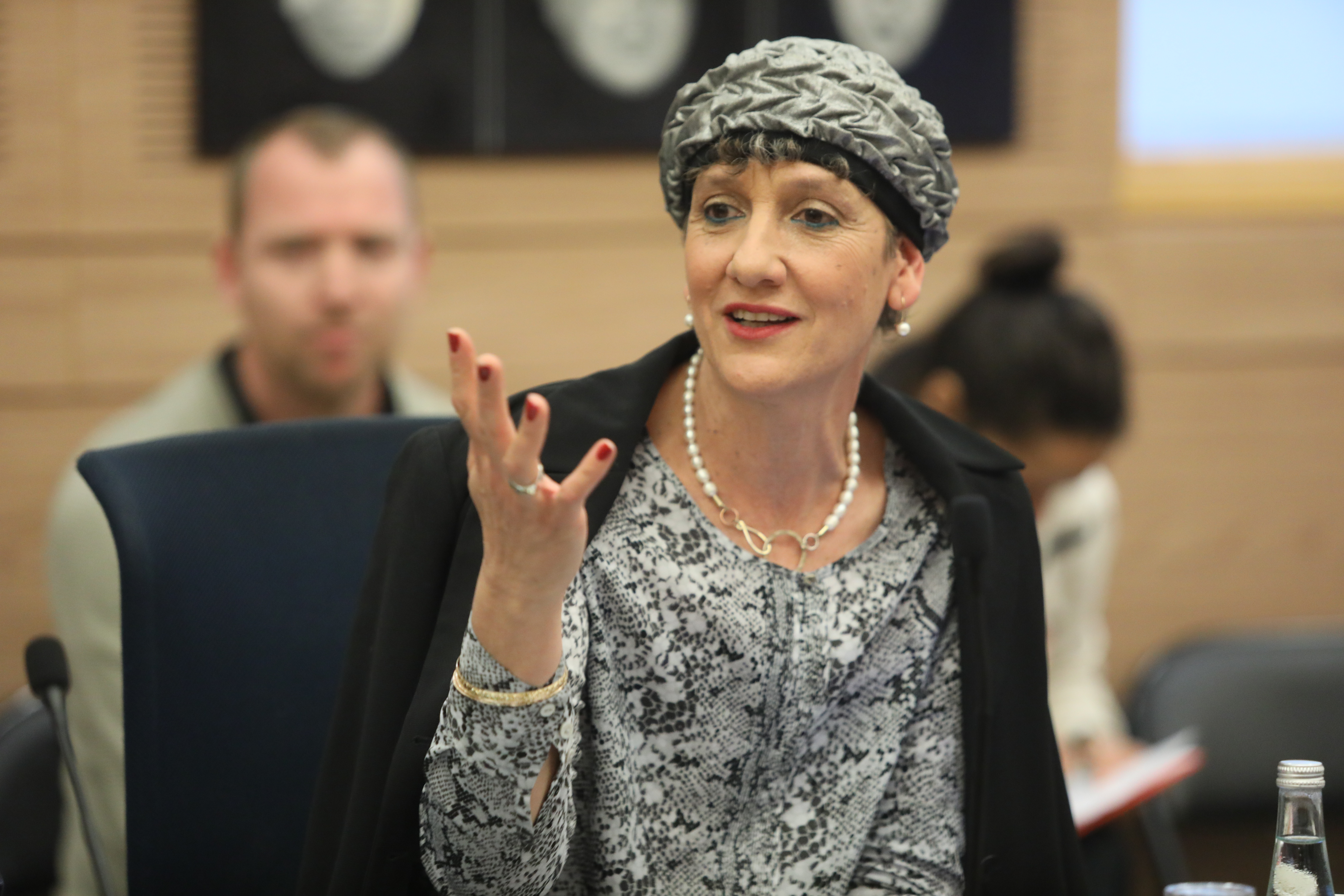
- Mualem in 2018

Faction represented in the Knesset
- 2013–2015: The Jewish Home
- 2015–2018: The Jewish Home
- 2018–2019: New Right

Personal details
- Born: 8 February 1965 (age 61) Haifa, Israel

Shulamit "Shuli" Mualem-Rafaeli (Hebrew: שולמית "שולי" מועלם-רפאלי; born 8 February 1965) is an Israeli nurse and politician. She served as a member of the Knesset for the Jewish Home between February 2013 and March 2015, and again from October 2015 until December 2018, when she joined the New Right.

== Biography ==
Born in Haifa to a religious Jewish family, Mualem was one of nine children. Her parents had immigrated from Morocco, a couple of months prior to her birth. She grew up in the Neve David neighbourhood, and was a member of the religious-Zionist youth organization Bnei Akiva. During her national service, she worked as a teacher.

After her national service, she attended the Shaare Zedek nursing school, gaining a bachelor's degree, before taking a master's degree course in industrial engineering at the Technion. She worked as a nurse at the Soroka Medical Center in Beersheba, becoming the hospital's Director of Risk Management. She also lectured at Ben-Gurion University of the Negev.

In 1997 her husband Moshe was one of 73 Israeli soldiers killed in a helicopter disaster. After his death, she served as Deputy and Acting Chairman of the IDF Widows and Orphans organisation. She also wrote several posthumous letters to her husband, which were published in a book, "My beloved Mualem", which was published in 2001. Having remarried, she was involved in fighting for IDF widows to continue to receive their pensions after remarrying.

Prior to the 2009 Knesset elections, Mualem won fourth place on the Jewish Home list. However, she later withdrew from the final list. She was placed twelfth on the party's list for the 2013 elections, and was elected to the Knesset, as the party won 12 seats. She was placed ninth on the party's list for the 2015 elections, losing her seat, as the party was reduced to eight seats. However, she returned to the Knesset in October 2015, when party leader Naftali Bennett resigned his seat under the Norwegian Law in order to allow Mualem to become an MK again.

In December 2018 Mualem was amongst the Jewish Home MKs to leave the party and form the breakaway New Right party. She was placed fifth on the party's list for the April 2019 elections, but lost her seat when the party failed to cross the electoral threshold.

In September 2020 she left New Right to join Likud.

She is Orthodox Jewish, married, and has seven children.
