= 2012 The Jewish Home leadership election =

- 5 November 2012
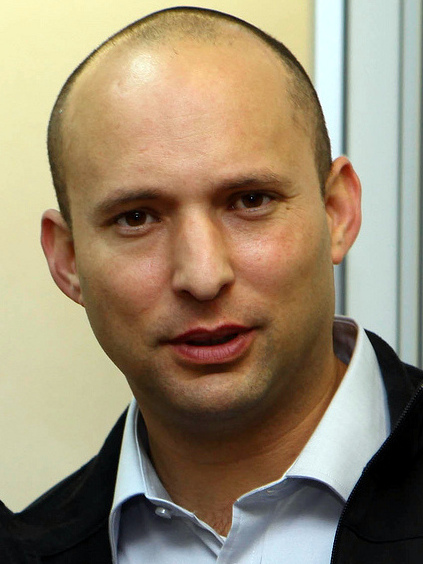

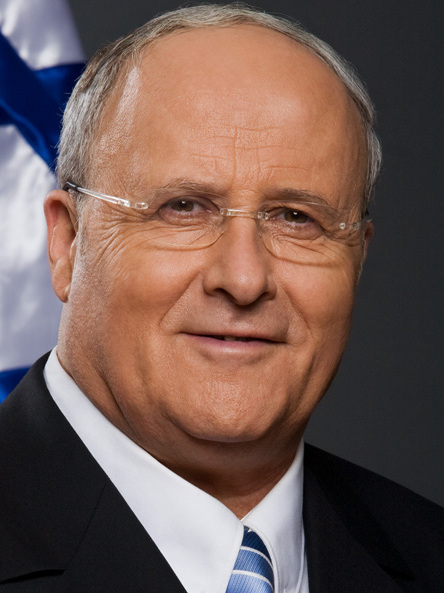
Candidate	Naftali Bennett	Zevulun Orlev
Party	Jewish Home	Jewish Home
Popular vote	23,645	11,501
Percentage	67.27%	32.73%
Leader before election
Daniel Hershkowitz
Elected Leader
Naftali Bennett

The 2012 The Jewish Home leadership election was held on 5 November 2012 to elect the leader of The Jewish Home party. The election took place in advance of the 2013 Israeli legislative election. Naftali Bennett was elected as leader, defeating Zevulun Orlev.

A month before the leadership election, incumbent leader Daniel Hershkowitz announced that he would not contend.

== Background ==
The Jewish Home was founded in 2008 as a merger of the National Religious Party and the National Union, who previously ran on a joint ticket in the 2006 election. The party's first leader was Daniel Hershkowitz, a mathematician who was chosen by a special committee led by Yaakov Amidror. In the 2009 election, the party was elected to the Knesset, winning 3 seats. The party then joined the newly-formed second Netanyahu government.

On 19 April 2012, the party decided to hold a membership census, which would be followed by elections to the party's leadership and electoral list in September. The census began on 22 April, but ended in early September. As a result, the leadership election took place in November. On 17 May, Member of the Knesset Zevulun Orlev announced his intention to run for leadership, challenging Hershkowitz. On 21 May, former Yesha Council chairman Naftali Bennett announced his campaign.

== Candidates ==
- Naftali Bennett, former chief of staff for Benjamin Netanyahu, former chairman of the Yesha Council, co-founder of the My Israel movement.
- Yehuda Cohen
- Zevulun Orlev, Member of the Knesset, former leader of the National Religious Party, former Minister of Welfare and Social Services.

=== Withdrawn ===
- Daniel Hershkowitz, incumbent party leader, Member of the Knesset and Minister of Science and Technology. (endorsed Orlev)

== Campaign ==
On 19 October, Bennett, Orlev and Hershkowitz participated in a televised debate held on Channel 2 and hosted by Amit Segal. The debate took place a day after the National Union merged into the Jewish Home. On 22 October, Hershkowitz announced his withdrawal from the election and endorsed Orlev.

== Results ==
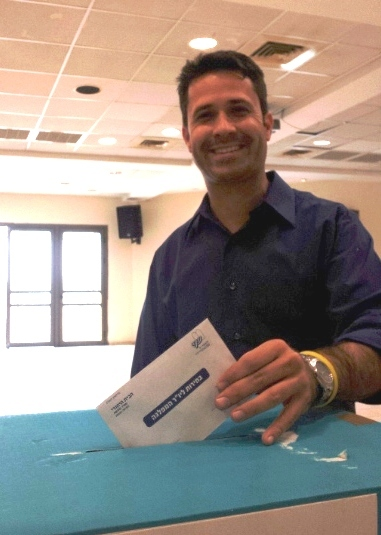
Jeremy Gimpel voting in the elections for the head of The Jewish Home party in the Neve Daniel event hall.

The election was open to the party's nearly 54,000 members to vote in 168 polling stations across the nation.

2015 The Jewish Home leadership election
Party	Candidate	Votes	%
Jewish Home	Naftali Bennett	23,645	67.27%
Jewish Home	Zevulun Orlev	11,501	32.73%
Jewish Home	Yehuda Cohen	79	0.22%

== Aftermath ==
After his loss, Orlev announced that he would be retiring from the Knesset. Following the primary, the party won 12 seats in the 2013 election, and remained in the coalition.

In 2019, The Times of Israel reported on a potential police probe into potential unreported funds received by Bennett's 2012 leadership campaign.

Bennett led the party until late 2018, when he left to co-found and lead The New Right. He later became the prime minister of Israel, serving from 2021 through 2022.
