= The Jewish Home =

Defunct political party in Israel

The Jewish Home הבית היהודי البيت اليهودي
- Leader: Hagit Moshe
- Founded: 18 November 2008
- Dissolved: 20 August 2023
- Preceded by: National Religious Party
- Merged into: Religious Zionist Party
- Headquarters: Jerusalem
- Ideology: Religious Zionism; Religious nationalism; Religious conservatism; Social conservatism; Social market economy; Modern Orthodox interests; Israeli settler interests
- Political position: Far-right
- Religion: Orthodox Judaism
- National affiliation: URWP (2019); Yamina (2019, 2020)
- Member parties: Tkuma (2013–2019); New Right (2022)
- Colours: Blue, green
- Most MKs: 8 (2013)

Election symbol
- ב (Note: Historical symbol of Mafdal. Despite this, the party used טב in all elections but 2009 and 2022 because of their alliance with National Union–Tkuma which uses the letter ט.)

Website
- www.baityehudi.org.il

The Jewish Home (Hebrew: הַבַּיִת הַיְהוּדִי, romanized: HaBayit HaYehudi) was an Orthodox Jewish, religious Zionist, and far-right political party in Israel. It was originally formed by a merger of the National Religious Party, Moledet and Tkuma in November 2008. However, Moledet broke away from the party after its top representative was placed 17th on the new party's list for the 2009 Knesset elections, and instead ran on a joint list with HaTikva. Tkuma later also left to join the National Union.

For the 2013 elections, the Jewish Home and Tkuma parties ran a joint list under the leadership of the chairman of the Jewish Home, Naftali Bennett. The party ran with Tkuma again in the 2015 elections. In April 2019, Jewish Home ran on a joint list with Tkuma and Otzma Yehudit. The parties registered under the name Union of Right-Wing Parties. The party ran on the Yamina joint list with Tkuma and the New Right in the September 2019 Israeli legislative election, though the joint list split into two factions on 10 October. Yamina ran again in the 2020 Israeli legislative election. Party leader Rafi Peretz announced on 5 January 2021 that he was retiring from politics and was succeeded by Hagit Moshe as the leader of the party on 19 January 2021. In 2023, the Jewish Home and the Religious Zionist Party agreed to merge to become a single party.

== History ==
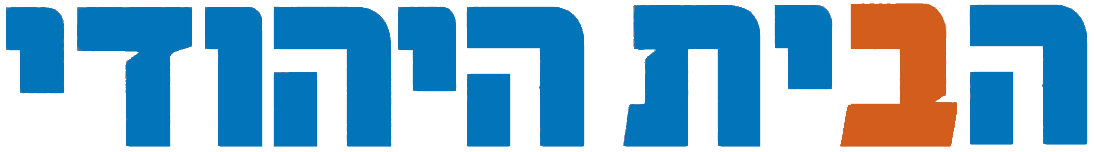
First logo of the Jewish Home from 2009, when it was known as 'The Jewish Home – The New Mafdal'

=== Formation ===
The National Religious Party (NRP) and the National Union alliance ran a joint list for the 2006 Knesset elections. On 3 November 2008 it was announced that the NRP and the Moledet and Tkuma factions of the National Union would merge to form a new party. However, the Ahi and HaTikva factions of the Union rejected the merger—their leaders, Effi Eitam and Aryeh Eldad, respectively, were both opposed to the party being a purely religious one, while Eitam was also unhappy that the new party would not hold primaries.

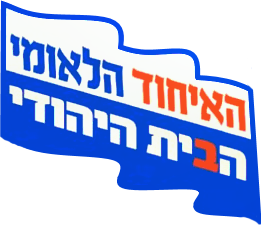
Initial logo of the united list of The Jewish Home and the National Union

The party was initially nameless. Five names were proposed: HaBayit HaYehudi ("Jewish Home"), Shorashim ("Roots"), Atzma'ut ("Independence"), Shalem ("Whole"), and Amihai ("My Nation Lives"). In an online ballot, the members chose "Jewish Home".

Yaakov Amidror was chosen to head a public committee formed to choose the party's list for the 2009 elections. On 8 December 2008, Rabbi Professor Daniel Hershkowitz, a mathematician from the Technion, was chosen to head the new party.

When Jewish Home announced its candidate list for the upcoming elections, five of the top six slots went to ex-NRP members. MK Uri Ariel of Tkuma was the sole exception: He received the third slot. Polls then indicated Jewish Home would get five to seven seats, thus making the first six spaces highly contested. The ex-National Union members again complained. Ex-Moledet MK Benny Elon stated that he would not seek re-election, and was replaced on the candidate list by American immigrant Uri Bank. The remaining Moledet members broke away, and allied with HaTikva in a revived Union (Bank also later switched to the Union.)

On 25 December, Tkuma MK Ariel left Jewish Home, and joined the Union. This left Jewish Home as little more than a renamed NRP, which was also reflected in its motto "New Mafdal" (מפד"ל החדשה). In the 2009 election, the party won three seats.

=== Bennett leads ===
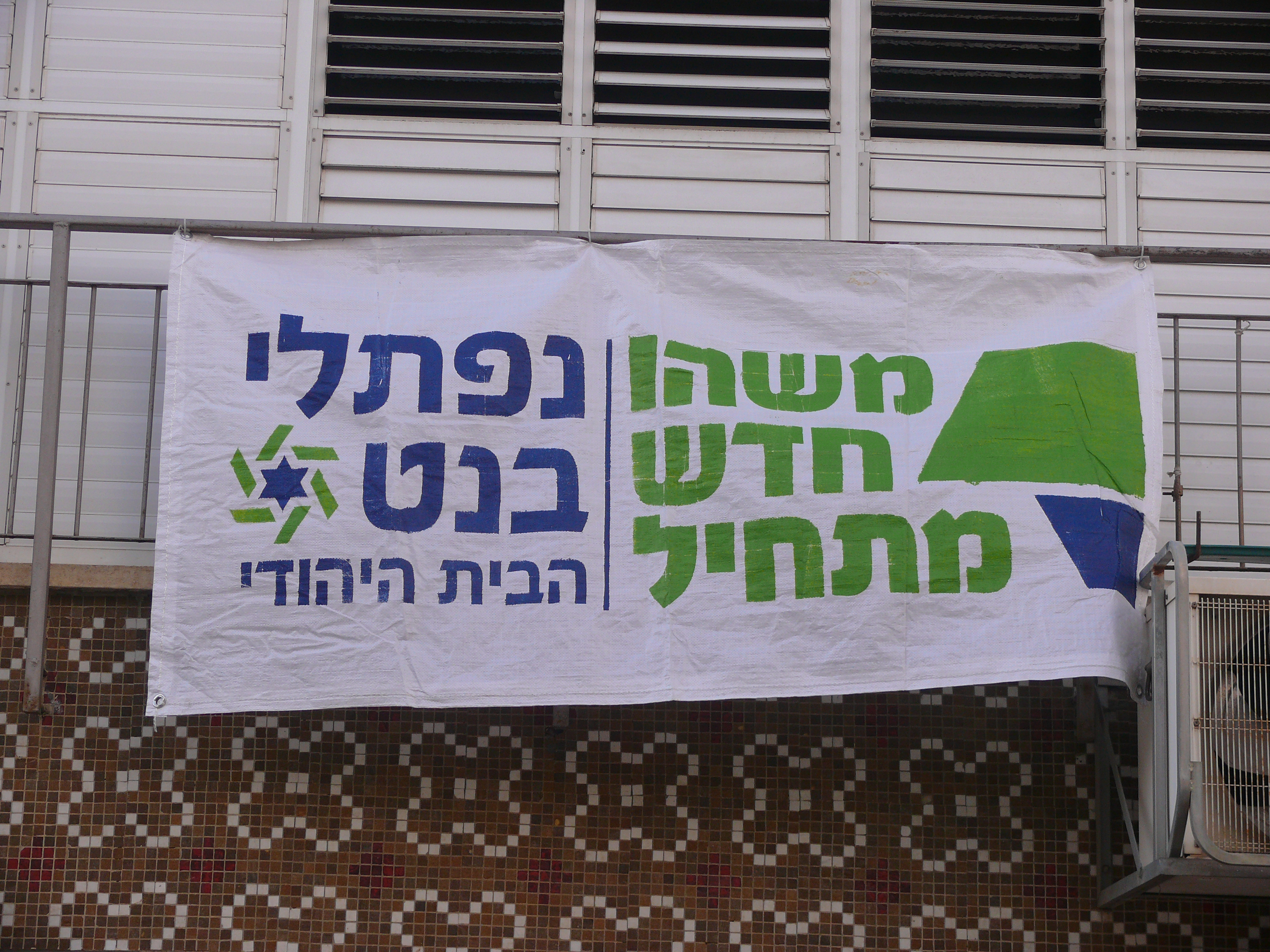
The Jewish Home election poster: "Something new begins", 2013

In November 2012, the Jewish Home held separate primaries for the leadership of the party. My Israel leader Naftali Bennett won over incumbent MK Zevulun Orlev, winning more than two-thirds of the vote, and Orlev announced he was resigning from politics. A week later, primaries for the remaining members of the list were held, and Nissan Slomiansky, Ayelet Shaked, and Uri Orbach reached the top spots. With the National Union breaking up, Uri Ariel officially re-united Tkuma with the Jewish Home to run on a joint list in the 2013 Israeli elections. A few Moledet candidates were included. In the elections that were held on 22 January 2013, the Jewish Home won 12 seats. The Jewish Home entered the thirty-third government of Israel under prime minister Benjamin Netanyahu, and had three ministers (Bennett, Ariel, and Orbach) and two deputy-ministers (Eli Ben Dahan and Avi Wortzman).

As part of its 2013 coalition agreement, the Jewish Home had the right to veto any laws that would change the status quo on religious issues. In December 2013, the party vetoed a Yesh Atid-proposed bill that sought to give gay fathers equal tax benefits, saying it would have far-reaching implications on marriage laws. Currently, mothers receive more benefits than do fathers under the law, and thus, couples composed of two men are ineligible for certain tax breaks.

The party lost four seats in the 2015 Israeli legislative election, going from 12 seats in the previous election to eight.

In December 2016, the party's member Shuli Mualem proposed the Regulation Bill. The law seeks to legalize dozens of small outposts of settlements built in the occupied Palestinian territories on private ground of individual Palestinians.

The Regulation Law passed legislation on 6 February 2017. The law exclusively refers to Palestinians, and allows the government to expropriate land from individual Palestinians against their will for compensation up to 25% above the land's value.

On 16 November 2018, the Jewish Home issued a statement claiming that the party intended to withdraw from Netanyahu's coalition government, and demanded an early election "as soon as possible". This threat came after Netanyahu denied party leader Naftali Bennett's request to become the defense minister. On 18 November, Netanyahu reneged on an earlier pledge to remove Jewish Home member Eli Ben Dahan as deputy defense minister. Bennett afterwards reneged on this pledge to withdraw on 19 November 2018, and agreed to abandon his push to become Defense Minister and keep the party in the coalition.

=== Peretz years ===
In December 2018, three Jewish Home MKs (Bennett, Mualem and Shaked) left the party to form the New Right. Rafi Peretz was elected leader of the party on 4 February 2019.

In the build-up to the April 2019 elections, the party agreed to run on a joint list with Tkuma, and later joined the Union of Right-Wing Parties (URWP) alliance alongside Otzma Yehudit.

Prior to the September 2019 elections, the Jewish Home joined the Yamina alliance alongside New Right and Tkuma. Following the elections, the bloc split into separate Knesset factions on 10 October, one consisting of the Jewish Home and Tkuma, and the other New Right. However, the parties re-united to reform Yamina prior to the 2020 elections.

On 22 April 2020, it was reported that Bennett was now "considering all options" for the Yamina alliance's political future, including departing from Netanyahu's government, which had just agreed to a coalition with the leader of the opposition Blue and White party Benny Gantz, and joining the opposition. Bennett was reported to be unhappy with the new coalition government's decision to hold back on the issue of judicial reform.

On 14 May 2020, the Jewish Home unofficially left Yamina and joined the Netanyahu government, with Peretz becoming Jerusalem Minister. The party officially split from Yamina on 14 July 2020.

After winning just one seat when contesting the 2020 Israeli legislative election within the Yamina party, the Jewish Home left Yamina and joined the thirty-fifth government of Israel. The party officially split from Yamina on 14 July 2020. Its leader, Rafi Peretz, was appointed Minister of Jerusalem Affairs and Minister of Diaspora Affairs in the new government.

=== 24th Knesset: Moshe elected ===
During the run-up to the 2021 Israeli legislative election, and amid poor showings in the polls, Peretz announced on 5 January 2021 that he would resign from his role as leader of the Jewish Home, and retire from politics, triggering a leadership election. The election was conducted on 19 January 2021, with 965 members of the Central Committee selecting the new leader. Those running were Hagit Moshe, the Deputy Mayor of Jerusalem, and Nir Orbach, the CEO of the Jewish Home. On 19 January, Hagit Moshe was elected to succeed Peretz as the leader of the Jewish Home with 472 votes (56.12%). On 4 February, Moshe announced that the Jewish Home will not contest the March 2021 election. The party held negotiations with different parties, but failed to find a running mate and did not register any electoral candidates. Orbach left the party, joined Yamina, and was placed sixth on its party list, going on to win a seat.

=== 25th Knesset: Joint ticket with Yamina ===
Yossi Brodny was chosen on 18 July 2022 to lead the party's slate ahead of the 2022 Israeli legislative election. The party allied with Yamina and a joint run, running under the name "The Jewish Home", was approved by the Central Committee of the party on 14 September 2022.

=== Candidate list (25th Knesset) ===
Top ten candidates for the 2022 elections to the 25th Knesset:

1. Minister Ayelet Shaked – Yamina
2. Yossi Brodny – Jewish Home
3. Amichai Porat – Yamina, son of Hanan Porat
4. Nitsana Darshan-Leitner – Jewish Home
5. MK Yomtob Kalfon – Yamina
6. MK Orna Starkmann – Yamina
7. Moshe Chanaya – Jewish Home
8. Noy Rozenfeld – Yamina
9. Gila Ben Naim – Jewish Home
10. Jeremy Saltan – Yamina

The party failed to pass the electoral threshold.

=== Dissolution ===
The Jewish Home announced in early August 2023 that Moshe and Religious Zionist Party leader Bezalel Smotrich had signed an agreement to merge their respective parties, with the name of the party expected to be The National Religious - Religious Zionism Party. The Jewish Home central committee voted to dissolve the party on 20 August 2023.

Moshe and Smotrich were in talks about a merger between the two parties since May 2023.

=== Aftermath ===
In August 2024, Yossi Brodny announced that he was joining Yisrael Beiteinu.

Other members joined Otzma Yehudit, New Hope and Shas.

In 2025, several former Yamina members were reported to have assisted in registering a new political party for former prime minister Naftali Bennett, referred to in the media as "Bennett 2026."

== Ideology ==
The party primarily represented Modern Orthodox as well as Chardal Jews. For many years, this community has been politically fractured. In the 2013 elections, the party was led by Naftali Bennett, a charismatic high-tech millionaire, who appealed to both religious and secular Israelis. The party's pro-settlement message and Bennett's personal appeal helped it increase popularity among a broader segment of the population. The attention that Bennett received also apparently had an effect on Likud's 2013 election strategy, pushing it to the right. Along with Yesh Atid, the Jewish Home surged in popularity by promising to end the controversial system of draft exemptions given to many ultra-Orthodox seminary students, and to "ease the burden" on middle-class Israelis who serve in the military, work, and pay taxes. These two parties became the two largest coalition parties in Prime Minister Netanyahu's government, and leaders of both parties were able to force Netanyahu to promise that the ultra-Orthodox political parties will not be in the new coalition. Despite Bennett's alliance with Yesh Atid leader Yair Lapid on many domestic issues, the two differ sharply over peace efforts and settlement building. Bennett is opposed to the creation of a Palestinian state, and has called for Israel to annex Area C of the West Bank and offer citizenship to the Palestinians living there. Their alliance ended during their time as coalition partners, before the 2015 Israeli legislative election.

Most of the party's candidates for the 2015 elections were opposed to same-sex marriage. Some of the remarks made by its candidates have been called homophobic by Yair Lapid; Zehava Gal-On and Mickey Rosenthal also criticized the comments. Despite this, in a 2016 poll conducted for the Hiddush organization, 57% of Jewish Home voters said they back same-sex marriage or partnerships.

The party was considered to be part of the national camp in Israeli politics, a group of political parties that share nationalist views and often form governments together.

== Criticism ==
In response to the party's short-lived 2019 alliance with Otzma Yehudit, Rabbi Benny Lau, a modern Orthodox rabbi from Jerusalem, said: "A vote for Bayit Yehudi is a vote for the racism of [Meir] Kahane." The rabbi equated Kahanism with Nazism.

== Leaders ==
	Leader	Took office	Left office	Elected/reelected as leader
1	Daniel Hershkowitz	2008	2012	2008
2	Naftali Bennett	2012	2018	2012, 2015, 2017
3	Rafi Peretz	2019	2021	2019
4	Hagit Moshe	2021	2023	2021

== Knesset election results ==
Election	Leader	Votes	%	Seats	+/–	Status
2009	Daniel Hershkowitz	96,765 (#11)	2.87	3 / 120	New	Coalition
2013 (Note: Four of the twelve seats are from Tkuma)	Naftali Bennett	345,985 (#4)	9.12	12 / 120	▲8	Coalition
2015 (Note: Two of the eight seats are from Tkuma)	Naftali Bennett	283,910 (#6)	6.74	8 / 120	▼4	Coalition
Apr 2019	Rafi Peretz	Part of the URWP (Note: Got 159,468 or 3.70%)		3 / 120	▼3	Snap election
Sep 2019	Rafi Peretz	Part of Yamina (Note: 2019, Got 260,655 or 5.87%) (Note: 2020, Got 240,689 or 5.24%)		2 / 120	▼1	Snap election
2020	Rafi Peretz	Part of Yamina		1 / 120	▼1	Coalition
2021	Hagit Moshe (Note: In 2022 Ayelet Shaked was the leader of the list.)	Did not contest				Extra-parliamentary
2022	Hagit Moshe	56,793 (#13)	1.19	0 / 120	Steady	Extra-parliamentary

== Knesset members list ==
Knesset	Years	MKs	Members
18	2009–2013	3	Daniel Hershkowitz, Uri Orbach, Zevulun Orlev
19	2013–2015	12	Naftali Bennett, Nissan Slomiansky, Ayelet Shaked, Uri Orbach (Note: Died in office, replaced by Hillel Horowitz on 16 February 2015), Avi Wortzman, Moti Yogev, Yoni Chetboun, Shuli Mualem
19	2013–2015	12	Tkuma: Uri Ariel, Eli Ben-Dahan, Zvulun Kalfa, Orit Strook
20	2015–2019	8	Naftali Bennett (Note: Replaced by Shuli Mualem after becoming education minister), Ayelet Shaked, Eli Ben-Dahan, Nissan Slomiansky, Yinon Magal (Note: Resigned on 30 November 2015 over sexual harassment allegations, replaced by Avi Wortzman then Naftali Bennett), Moti Yogev
20	2015–2019	8	Tkuma: Uri Ariel, Bezalel Smotrich
21	2019	3	Rafi Peretz, Moti Yogev, Idit Silman
22	2019–2020	2	Rafi Peretz, Moti Yogev
23	2020–2021	1	Rafi Peretz
