= Yossi Brodny =

Israeli politician

Yossi Brodny יוסי ברודני
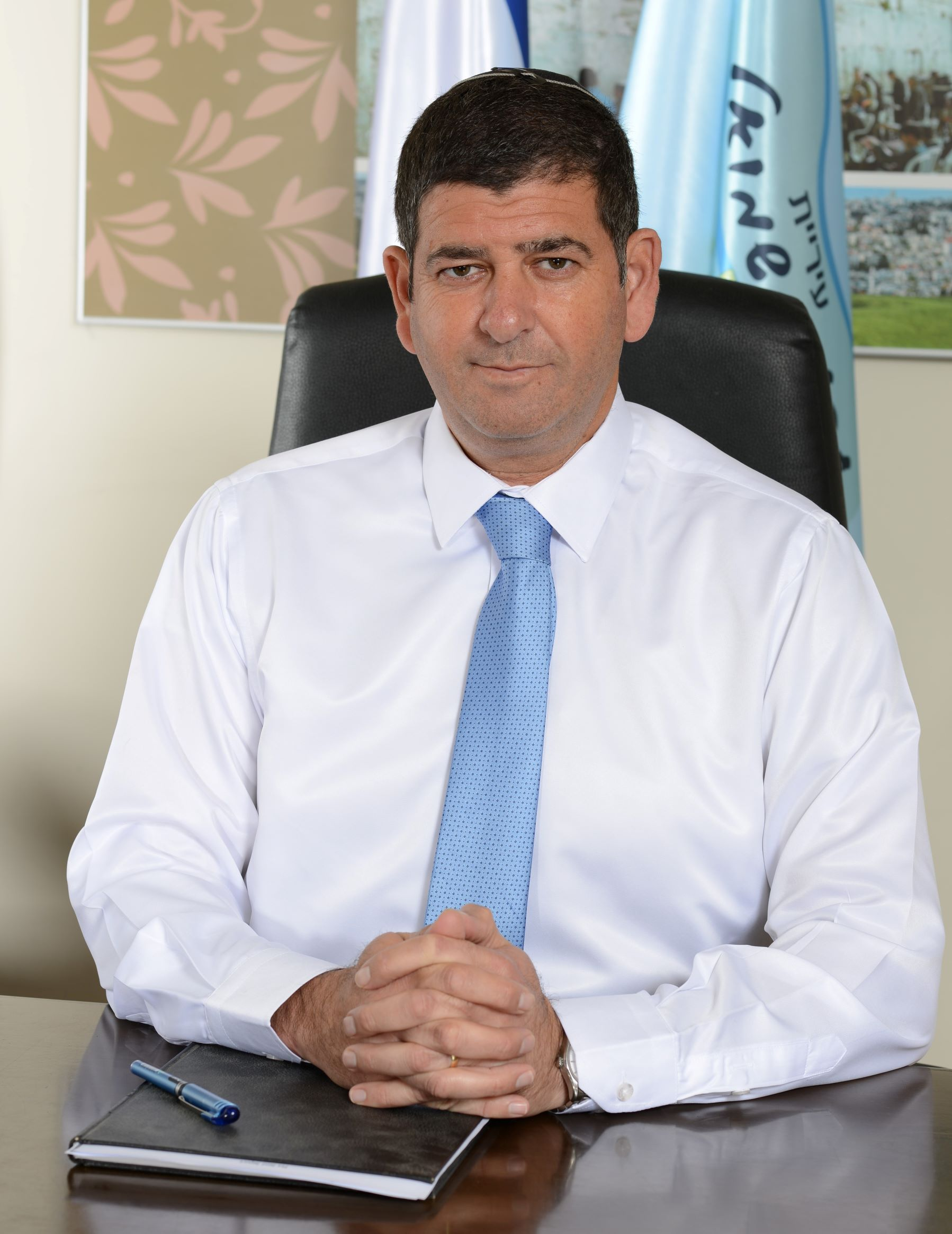
- Brodny in 2022

Mayor of Giv'at Shmuel
- Incumbent
- Assumed office 11 November 2008
- Preceded by: Zamir Ben-Ari

Member of the Giv'at Shmuel City Council
- In office 28 October 2003 – 11 November 2008

Personal details
- Born: Yosef Brodny; 15 January 1971 (age 55) Hadera, Israel
- Party: Yisrael Beiteinu (since 2024)
- Other political affiliations: National Religious Party (2003–2008); Likud (2008–2022); The Jewish Home (2022–2023); Religious Zionist Party (2023–2024)
- Spouse: Einat Brodny
- Children: 4
- Education: Yeshivat Kerem B'Yavneh
- Alma mater: Reichman University

Military service
- Allegiance: Israel
- Branch/service: Paratroopers Brigade
- Unit: Battalion 202

Yosef "Yossi" Brodny (Hebrew: יוסי ברודני; born 15 January 1971) is an Israeli politician who was the head of the electoral slate for The Jewish Home for the 2022 Israeli legislative election and has been the mayor of the Israeli city of Giv'at Shmuel since 2008.

== Early life ==
Brodny was born in Hadera. His maternal grandparents were born in Czechoslovakia. He served in the Israel Defense Forces between 1989 until 1996, in the Paratroopers Brigade.

== Political career ==
From 2003 to 2008, Brodny served as member of Giv'at Shmuel council. In 2008, he was elected mayor of Giv'at Shmuel. In 2008, he joined the Likud party. In October 2013, he was elected mayor again, this time without competing. On 18 July 2022, he was elected to the first position on The Jewish Home's electoral list for the 2022 Israeli legislative election. Brodny is reelected a fifth time as the mayor of Giv'at Shmuel in February 2024 during the Israeli municipal elections. In September 2024 it was reported he joined Yisrael Beiteinu.

Brodny was left off the party's slate ahead of the 2026 Israeli legislative election.
