= Garin Torani =

Garin Torani (Hebrew: גרעין תורני)(lit. Torah Nucleus) refers to a group of Religious Zionist individuals and families who settle in communities with low religious population. They aim to strengthen the community's connection to religious Judaism, promote integration (of religious and non-religious Jews) and bring about social change. They are usually centred around a Yeshiva and many establish educational and cultural institutes.

== History ==
The Garin Torani model was established to aid development towns in Israel. The first group settled in Kiryat Shmona in 1968. Later, groups were sent to Ma'alot-Tarshiha, Eilat, Yerucham and Tzfat. While differing models exist, the main mission is to effect social change in a neglected community through role models, enthusiasm and Jewish values. The goal is to increase stability and social integration, as well as productivity and connection to Torah.

Shaalei Torah initiated a program in 2007 to develop the role of a communal rabbi in the garin communities. Some garinim are focused around a central yeshiva or kollel.

Often, they establish religious Zionist schools and youth groups in the community. They reach out to families in need and children at risk through the establishment of a Bayit Cham, or Warm Home which offers after-school and summer programs for children at risk. Some groups distribute food packages before the holidays, delivered personally by neighbors or garin members, reaching out both financially and socially. In addition to social development and integration, they try to infuse an understanding of Torah and Jewish values and create a positive religious experience through Torah classes, holiday events and educational programs.

== Organizations ==
Shaalei Torah was the first organization to realize the need for a unified body to connect garinim. The organization began as a small garin in Beit Shemesh in the 1980s. After establishing the Beit Shemesh Garin and effecting significant social improvements, it expanded its scope to provide support for the establishment of new Garinim. It provides a venue in which established garinim can share their experience with newer ones. Shaalei Torah has helped to establish a network of Garinim and offers guidance and funding. I

== Criticism ==
The movement have been linked to a series of racist attacks against Arab residents of Israel. Poorer communities often see them as settlers or an external force invading their communities. Some cases of extreme violence and intimidation have been initiated by them. The role of Garninim Toraniim was also criticized during the 2021 Israel–Palestine crisis, especially in Lod where they've been involved in settling inside the city's exclusively Arab-Israeli communities, for the explicit purpose of "Strengthening the city's Jewish-Israeli identity.

Members of the Garin Torani in Lod had a 'war room headquarters' during the Jewish-Arab riots in Lod in May 2021.

Members of the Garin in Lod killed an Arab resident of the city. On May 11, 2021, the first night of riots in Lod, members of the Garin Hatorani opened fire on Arab Lod protesters, killing Moussa Hassouneh, a 31-year-old father of three, who was on his way home. Police detained five suspects and released them all within three days. In October 2021, Israeli public attorney's decided to acquit all five Jewish-Israeli suspects. In May 2022, Adalah, the Legal Center for Arab Minority Rights in Israel, obtained video footage of police investigating the murder of Palestinian citizen, Mussa Hassouna, in Lod during the violent May 2021 events. The footage indicates that Israeli politicians pressured police to close the files against 5 Jewish-Israeli suspects.

The Arabs of Lod, who make up about 30% of the city’s residents, say Mayor Yair Revivo has prioritized services and facilities for the Garin members living in Arab neighborhoods. Their biggest grievance is over housing. Revivo, a former campaign manager for Netanyahu, has intensified demolitions of old Arab buildings, prevented Arabs from buying new homes, and also from buying the government homes they live in, all while building new neighborhoods exclusively for the religious Jews.

== See also ==
- Gar'in
- Jewish fundamentalism
- Kiruv
