= April 2019 Israeli legislative election =

- 9 April 2019
- All 120 seats in the Knesset; 61 seats needed for a majority
- Turnout: 68.46% (▼3.88pp)
Party	Leader	Vote %	Seats	+/–
Likud	Benjamin Netanyahu	26.46	35	+5
Blue and White	Benny Gantz	26.13	35	+24
Shas	Aryeh Deri	5.99	8	+1
UTJ	Yaakov Litzman	5.78	8	+2
Hadash–Ta'al	Ayman Odeh	4.49	6	0
Labor	Avi Gabbay	4.43	6	−13
Yisrael Beiteinu	Avigdor Lieberman	4.01	5	−1
URWP	Rafi Peretz	3.70	5	−3
Meretz	Tamar Zandberg	3.63	4	−1
Kulanu	Moshe Kahlon	3.54	4	−6
Ra'am–Balad	Mansour Abbas	3.33	4	−3
This lists parties that won seats. See the complete results below.
Prime Minister before	Prime Minister after
Benjamin Netanyahu; Likud (34th)	Benjamin Netanyahu; Likud (caretaker)

Early legislative elections were held in Israel on 9 April 2019 to elect the 120 members of the 21st Knesset. Elections had been due in November 2019, but were brought forward following a dispute between members of the current government over a bill on Haredi conscription, as well as impending corruption charges against incumbent prime minister Benjamin Netanyahu.

Netanyahu's Likud tied with Blue and White alliance of Benny Gantz, both winning 35 seats. The balance of power was held by smaller parties, with a majority being right-wing and religious parties that had previously sat in coalition with Likud, which would have allowed Netanyahu to form the next government.

Due to fractures over Haredi conscription within the Netanyahu coalition, efforts at government formation ultimately failed, leading to a snap election in September five months later.

== Background ==
Defense Minister Avigdor Lieberman had opposed a draft law (supported by the Haredi parties) which would allow full-time Torah students exemptions from serving in the IDF. Meretz and Yesh Atid submitted a proposal on 12 March 2018 seeking the dissolution of the Knesset. Early elections were averted at that point in time.

Lieberman would eventually leave the government over the cease-fire with Hamas in Gaza. This leaves the governing coalition with 61 seats (out of 120 in total). The Jewish Home announced on 16 November 2018 that it would leave the government, as Naftali Bennett (the head of the party) was not given Lieberman's former Defense Ministry post. Reports were that Netanyahu would not be giving the post to Bennett and was to meet with other coalition leaders on 18 November to determine a date for early election. However, after further discussion, Bennett decided to stay on as education minister, narrowly avoiding the collapse of the Netanyahu government again. However, continued dysfunction over various issues, including military service for the Haredim, caused parliament to dissolve and early elections to be called for 9 April 2019. Had early elections not been called, the regularly scheduled elections would have taken place seven months later, on 5 November 2019.

== Electoral system ==
The 120 seats in the Knesset are elected by closed list proportional representation in a single nationwide constituency. The electoral threshold for the election is 3.25%. In most cases, this implies a minimum party size of four seats, but on some occasions, a party can end up with three.

While election day was on 9 April 2019, polls opened in embassies around the world on 28 March.

=== Surplus-vote agreements ===
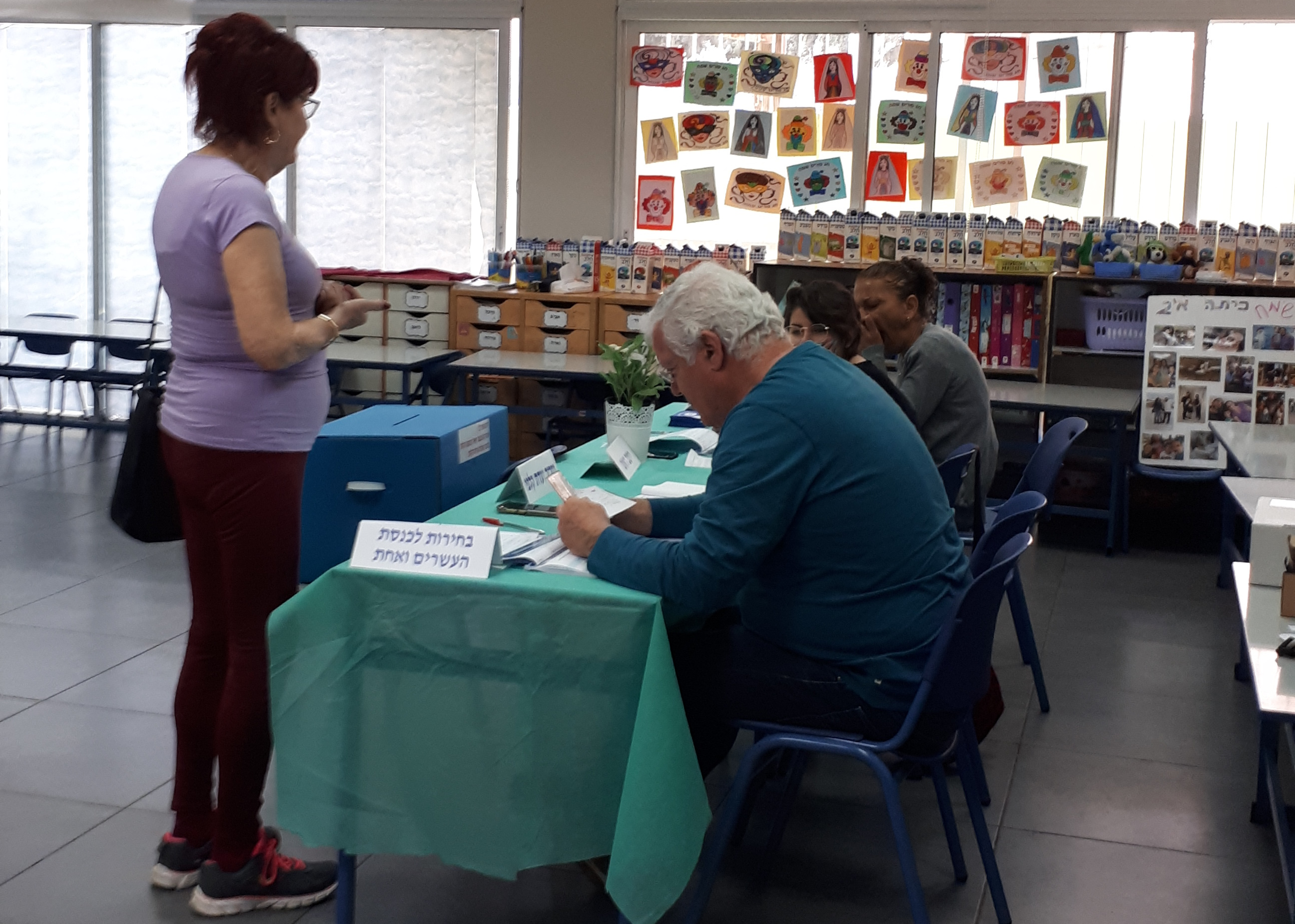
Voting in the election day in a polling station in HaBiluyim Primary School in Ramat Gan.

Two party lists can sign a surplus-vote agreement that allows them to compete for leftover seats as though they are running together on the same list. The Bader–Ofer method disproportionately favors larger lists, meaning that such an alliance is more likely to receive leftover seats than both of its comprising lists would be individually. If the alliance receives leftover seats, the Bader–Ofer calculation is then applied privately, to determine how the seats are divided among the two allied lists. The following agreements were signed by parties prior to the election:

- Union of Right-Wing Parties and Likud
- New Right and Yisrael Beiteinu
- Meretz and Labor
- United Torah Judaism and Shas
- Hadash–Ta'al and Balad-Ra'am

== Political parties ==
=== Factions before the election ===
The table below lists the parliamentary factions represented in the 20th Knesset.

Name	Ideology	Symbol	Primary demographic	Leader	2015 result		Seats at 2018 dissolution
Name	Ideology	Symbol	Primary demographic	Leader	Votes (%)	Seats	Seats at 2018 dissolution
Likud	Conservatism	מחל	-	Benjamin Netanyahu	23.40%	30 / 120	30 / 120
Labor	Social democracy	אמת	-	Avi Gabbay	18.67% (Note: Hatnua and the Labor Party ran as a joint list called the Zionist Union. Amir Peretz was elected as a member of Hatnua, but defected to Labor before the split.)	18 / 120	19 / 120
Hatnua	Liberalism	אמת	-	Tzipi Livni	18.67%	6 / 120	5 / 120
Joint List	Big tent	ודעם	Israeli Arabs	Ayman Odeh	10.54% (Note: Ta'al ran as part of the Joint List and split off before the 2019 elections. Due to rotation agreements, one seat Ta'al initially held in the Knesset rotated to other factions of the Joint List.)	11 / 120	12 / 120
Ta'al	Arab nationalism	ודעם	Israeli Arabs	Ahmad Tibi	10.54%	2 / 120	1 / 120
Yesh Atid	Liberalism	פה	-	Yair Lapid	8.81%	11 / 120	11 / 120
Kulanu	Economic egalitarianism	כ	-	Moshe Kahlon	7.49%	10 / 120	10 / 120
Jewish Home	Religious Zionism; Religious conservatism	טב	Modern Orthodox and Chardal Jews	Rafi Peretz	6.74%	8 / 120	5 / 120
Shas	Religious conservatism	שס	Sephardic and Mizrahi Haredim	Aryeh Deri	5.73%	7 / 120	7 / 120
United Torah Judaism	Religious conservatism	ג	Ashkenazi Haredim	Yaakov Litzman	5.03%	6 / 120	6 / 120
Yisrael Beiteinu	Nationalism; Secularism	ל	Russian-speakers	Avigdor Lieberman	5.11%	6 / 120	5 / 120
Meretz	Progressivism; Secularism	מרצ	-	Tamar Zandberg	3.93%	5 / 120	5 / 120
New Right	National conservatism Economic liberalism	נ	-	Naftali Bennett, Ayelet Shaked	N/A		3 / 120
Independent		-	-	Orly Levy	N/A		1 / 120

=== Public expression of interest ===
- The Zehut Party, under the leadership of Moshe Feiglin, was founded in 2015 for the purpose of running in the Knesset elections as a right-wing libertarian Zionist party. It held Israel's first open primaries on 29 January 2019.
- Naftali Bennett, Ayelet Shaked and Shuli Mualem announced on 29 December 2018 that they would leave the Jewish Home party and form a new religious-secular party called the New Right.
- Engineer and Nazareth resident Salman Abu Ahmad announced on 2 January that he launched a new Israeli Arab party named New Horizon — An Arab Centrist Party, which would participate in the elections. However, the party did not run.
- Former IDF brigadier general Gal Hirsch announced on 8 January that he launched a new party named Shield of Israel.
- Motti Ashkenazi and Gad Haran will lead the Social Justice Party.
- Amos Danieli will run as part of the For Our Sake party.
- Semyon Grafman will run as part of the Social Safety party, being known for attempting to register his party using a ballot symbol which is pronounced similar to the English word fuck.
- Tkuma and The Jewish Home ran on a joint list named the Union of Right-Wing Parties alongside Otzma Yehudit.
- Former Likud MK Oren Hazan headed the Tzomet party.
- Orly Levy ran in the election with a political party named Gesher. She announced that she and her party would run independently after a failed joint-list agreement with Benny Gantz and his Resilience party.
- Benny Gantz's Israel Resilience Party ("Hosen LeYisrael" in Hebrew) ran on a united list named Blue & White, with Moshe Ya'alon's Telem, Yair Lapid's Yesh Atid and former Israel Defense Forces Chief of Staff Gabi Ashkenazi.

=== Withdrawals ===
- Tzipi Livni announced on 18 February 2019 that her Hatnua party would not contest the election.
- Left-wing activist Eldad Yaniv announced on 30 December 2018 that he would re-form his 2013 party named "Eretz Hadasha", which would have run in the upcoming election, though Yaniv dropped out of the race following the revealing of the Gantz/Lapid joint list on 20 February 2019.
- The Green Leaf party announced on 20 February 2019 that it would not participate in the election.
- Haredi Women's College founder Adina Bar-Shalom had expressed interest in participating in the elections with her newly formed, but unregistered, party Ahi Yisraeli, though the party announced its withdrawal on 26 February 2019.
- Yom-Tov Samia announced the withdrawal of B'Yahad on 4 March 2019.
- Eli Yishai announced the withdrawal of Yachad on 27 March 2019.

== Campaign ==
Some parties, like Likud, Labor, the Jewish Home, Zehut and Meretz, have systems in which the leadership and most candidates on their lists are elected in primary elections.

=== Blue and White ===
Benny Gantz's Israel Resilience Party and Moshe Ya'alon's Telem unveiled its party slate on 19 February 2019. Yair Lapid's Yesh Atid party unveiled its party slate on 18 February 2019. On 21 February 2019, the three parties agreed to run on a united list named Blue and White.

=== Union of Right-Wing Parties ===
The Jewish Home held its leadership primaries on 27 April 2017; Naftali Bennett won with 80.3% of the vote, Yonatan Branski received 12.2% and Yitzhak Zagha received 7.47%. In the aftermath of the formation of the New Right and Bennett's leaving, the Jewish Home cancelled its primaries. Rafi Peretz was elected leader of the Jewish Home on 4 February.

The Tkuma party held its leadership primaries on 14 January 2019; Bezalel Smotrich defeated Uri Ariel.

On 14 February 2019, Jewish Home agreed to run on a joint list with the Tkuma party. Jewish Home leader Rafi Peretz headed the joint list, with Tkuma chair Bezalel Smotrich as the number two. On 20 February 2019, they agreed to include Otzma Yehudit in their list, titled the Union of Right-Wing Parties. The inclusion of Otzma Yehudit prompted strong criticism.

=== Labor ===
The Labor Party held its leadership primaries on 10 July 2017; Avi Gabbay defeated Amir Peretz in the run-off, with Isaac Herzog being defeated during the first round of voting. The party held primaries on 11 February 2019 to choose members for its slate.

=== Likud ===
The Likud leadership primary election was originally scheduled for 23 February 2016 following Prime Minister Benjamin Netanyahu's proposal, and later cancelled by a party court on the basis that the Likud constitution did not require a vote when there was only one candidate. Likud held the primary for the rest of its list on 5 February 2019, which resulted in several of Netanyahu's rivals winning senior spots. Voting irregularities surfaced in the primary results. In some cases, specific candidates received more votes in some locales than the total number of ballots cast in those locales. The Likud party investigated the matter. In the final results, Knesset speaker Yuli Edelstein came in first place, followed by Yisrael Katz, Gilad Erdan, Gideon Sa'ar and Miri Regev.

On 26 February 2019, the "Likud TV" studio released the graves video, which raised an ire over use of military cemetery.

On 28 February 2019, the Attorney General, Avichai Mandelblit, announced his intent to indict Prime Minister Netanyahu on three charges which include bribery, fraud and breach of trust. These include trading legislation for favorable press coverage.

=== Meretz ===
Meretz held its leadership primaries on 22 March 2018; Tamar Zandberg won with 71% of the vote, Avi Buskila received 29%. Meretz held its primary on 14 February 2019.

=== Yisrael Beiteinu ===
Avigdor Lieberman's Yisrael Beiteinu released its party slate on 19 February 2019.

=== Zehut ===
The Zehut party held Israel's first open primaries on 29 January 2019, in which all Israeli voters (including those living abroad) were able to vote via a secure online website. About 12,000 people voted in these primaries, which determined the order of the candidates who won in the party's internal primaries in September 2017.

== Opinion polls ==
These graphs show the polling trends from the time Knesset candidate lists were finalized on 21 February, until Friday before election day (5 April).

If more than one poll was conducted on the same day, the graphs show the average of the polls for that date.

=== Blocs ===
Legend

- Right-of-centre parties: all current government parties—Likud, Kulanu, (Note: Kulanu is a centre to centre-right party that has expressed openness to serve in either a Likud- or Blue & White-led government.) Shas, United Torah Judaism (UTJ), Union of Right-Wing Parties (URWP) and New Right—as well as Yisrael Beiteinu and Zehut. (Note: Zehut is a right-wing libertarian party that has expressed openness to serve in either a Likud- or Blue & White-led government.)
- Centre and left-of-centre parties: Labor, Blue & White, (Note: Blue & White has expressed its intention not to form a coalition with Ra'am-Balad or Hadash-Ta'al.) Ra'am-Balad, Hadash-Ta'al, Meretz and Gesher. (Note: Gesher is a centre-left party that has expressed openness to serve in either a Likud- or Blue & White-led government.)

Note: Political blocs do not necessarily determine the exact make-up of post-election coalitions.

== Allegations of misconduct ==
The Hadash–Ta'al alliance filed a complaint requesting the removal of 1,200 concealed cameras in polling places in Arab communities. A judge overseeing the election ordered the concealed equipment removed. The company that set up the cameras, Kaizler Inbar, bragged about its role in social media posts.

Fake IDs were used in Herzliya and some voting slips for Blue & White, Meretz, Likud, Zehut and Yisrael Beiteinu disappeared in Petah Tikva.

Shas was criticized for giving out candles at polling stations.

== Results ==
Party	Votes	%	Seats	+/–
Likud	1,140,370	26.46	35	+5
Blue and White	1,125,881	26.13	35	+24
Shas	258,275	5.99	8	+1
United Torah Judaism	249,049	5.78	8	+2
Hadash–Ta'al	193,442	4.49	6	0
Labor Party	190,870	4.43	6	–13
Yisrael Beiteinu	173,004	4.01	5	–1
Union of Right-Wing Parties	159,468	3.70	5	–3
Meretz	156,473	3.63	4	–1
Kulanu	152,756	3.54	4	–6
United Arab List–Balad	143,666	3.33	4	–3
New Right	138,598	3.22	0	New
Zehut	118,031	2.74	0	New
Gesher	74,701	1.73	0	New
Social Security	4,618	0.11	0	New
The Arab List (Mada–ANP)	4,135	0.10	0	0
Social Justice	3,843	0.09	0	New
Shield of Israel	3,394	0.08	0	New
Justice for All	3,281	0.08	0	New
Tzomet	2,417	0.06	0	New
Yashar	1,438	0.03	0	New
Zekhuyotenu BeKoleinu	1,316	0.03	0	New
Veteran Civil	1,168	0.03	0	New
Kol Yisrael Ahim	1,140	0.03	0	New
Pirate Party	819	0.02	0	0
Pashut Ahava	733	0.02	0	New
Eretz Yisrael Shelanu	701	0.02	0	New
We are all friends Na Nach	624	0.01	0	0
MeHathala	603	0.01	0	New
Hope for Change	562	0.01	0	0
Green Economy – One Nation	556	0.01	0	0
Education	518	0.01	0	New
Ahrayut LaMeyasdim	428	0.01	0	New
Human Dignity	404	0.01	0	New
Shavim	401	0.01	0	New
Social Leadership	385	0.01	0	New
Ani VeAta	368	0.01	0	New
Bible Bloc	353	0.01	0	New
Ihud Bnei HaBrit	265	0.01	0	New
Brit Olam	216	0.01	0	0
Total	4,309,270	100.00	120	0
Valid votes	4,309,270	99.29		
Invalid/blank votes	30,983	0.71		
Total votes	4,340,253	100.00		
Registered voters/turnout	6,339,729	68.46		
Source: CEC

=== Members of the Knesset who lost their seats ===
Party	Name	Year elected
Blue and White	Aliza Lavie	2013
Gesher	Orly Levy	2009
Kulanu	Tali Ploskov	2015
Kulanu	Meirav Ben-Ari	2015
Kulanu	Akram Hasson	2016
Kulanu	Fentahun Seyoum	2019
Labor	Merav Michaeli	2013
Labor	Omer Bar-Lev	2013
Labor	Revital Swid	2015
Labor	Haim Jelin	2015
Labor	Michal Biran	2013
Labor	Eitan Cabel	1996
Labor	Yael Cohen Paran	2015
Labor	Saleh Saad	2017
Labor	Leah Fadida	2017
Labor	Nachman Shai	2009
Labor	Moshe Mizrahi	2018
Likud	Ayoob Kara	2015
Likud	Yehuda Glick	2016
Likud	Nurit Koren	2015
Likud	Anat Berko	2015
Likud	Yaron Mazuz	2015
Likud	Avraham Neguise	2015
Likud	Nava Boker	2015
Meretz	Mossi Raz	2017
New Right	Naftali Bennett	2013
New Right	Ayelet Shaked	2013
New Right	Shuli Mualem	2013
Tzomet	Oren Hazan	2015
United Arab List	Talab Abu Arar	2013
United Arab List	Said al-Harumi	2017
Yisrael Beiteinu	Hamad Amar	2009

== Aftermath ==
Leader of Blue and White faction Benny Gantz conceded, paving the way for incumbent Prime Minister Benjamin Netanyahu to start talks with other parties to form a governing coalition. On 15 and 16 April, leaders of all the parties who won seats in the Knesset met with President Reuven Rivlin to recommend a designated person to form a government. Netanyahu received recommendations from leaders representing 65 seats in the Knesset, whereas Gantz received recommendations from leaders representing only 45 seats in the Knesset. Leaders of the two Arab parties, representing 10 seats in the Knesset, declined to make any recommendation. Based on the recommendations he received, Rivlin designated Netanyahu to form the next governing coalition. After a month of negotiations, Netanyahu's failure to form a government led to a 74 to 45 vote in the Knesset in favour of dispersing just after midnight on 29 May 2019. The new election was scheduled for 17 September 2019.

== See also ==
- 2018–2022 Israeli political crisis
- List of members of the twenty-first Knesset
- 2018 Israeli municipal elections
- 2019 in Israel
- List of elections in 2019
