= Likud video of graves =

The graves video
- The final image of the graves video, 2019
- סרטון הקברים
- Directed by: Benjamin Netanyahu
- Based on: חלקת הל"ה – הר הרצל.jpg
- Produced by: Likud TV
- Starring: Avishai Ivri
- Narrated by: Eliraz Sadeh
- Production company: Likud TV
- Release date: 26 February 2019
- Running time: 1:24 minutes
- Country: Israel
- Language: Hebrew

Likud video of graves, or "the graves video" (Hebrew: סרטון הקברים), was a short film, which was produced and broadcast on February 26, 2019, by the "Likud TV" studio, submitted by Eliraz Sadeh on the digital accounts of the Benjamin Netanyahu's online social networks.

In this video, the Israeli journalist Avishai Ivri described Benny Gantz, the chairman of the Blue and White (political alliance), as the left. At the end of the video, Ivri is seen being filmed against the background of the military cemetery on Mount Herzl with the graves of the killed Israeli soldiers of the Convoy of 35, claiming that "the left is dangerous".

== Video description ==
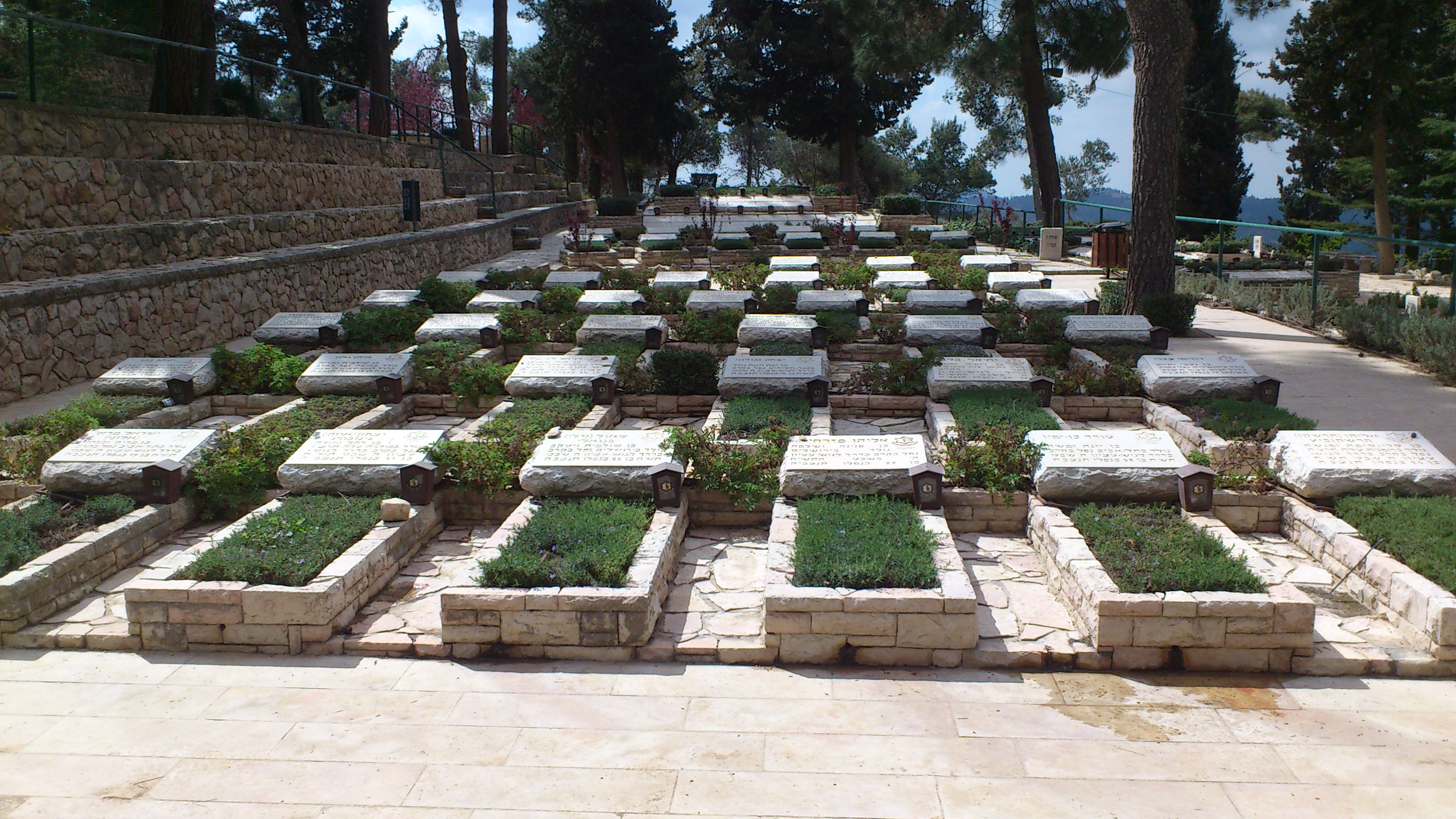
The graves of the Convoy of 35, the original image which was uploaded to Commons by User:Farouk, 2015

Ivri was a member of the Likud campaign team, and appeared on its paid broadcasts. The graves video ran less than a minute, and began with Ivri speaking with a picture in the background of the 2017 Halamish stabbing attack, in which the Solomon family was murdered, and with a picture of the Dolphinarium discotheque massacre during the first Sharon government.

Ivri continued to speak against the backdrop of pictures of Netanyahu, pictures of two other attacks that, according to Ivri, occurred due to leftist policies, a picture of the Hamas government in Gaza, and pictures of Gantz with his electoral list. Ivri concluded his remarks by saying: "Gantz is leftist, and left is dangerous", against the backdrop of the graves.

== Reactions ==
The video's use of the image of graves of Israeli casualties of war sparked outrage in the media.

- The Blue and White alliance issued a statement: "The IDF soldiers who fell in the battle and the bereaved families have never imagined that a prime minister would use them in a political campaign videos. Go apologize at the families immediately, or this stain will accompany you for the rest of your life. Shame on you, Netanyahu".
- The Israeli Labor Party chairman Avi Gabbay also demanded that Netanyahu would apologize at Gantz and the soldiers' families.
- The Meretz party said that Netanyahu and the right had no boundaries.
- Orly Levy-Abekasis said that this was not the Likud which she grew up with.
- Netanyahu said: "I saw this video and was shocked. I immediately requested to remove it. I also asked to check who did it, how it happened, and to suspend from the campaign the person who did it. I understand the hearts of the families because I am part of them. I have been going to My brother's grave for 43 years.

The Likud election campaign is personally managed by Netanyahu. As a result, the journalist Uri Misgav claimed: "Do not believe Benjamin Netanyahu's apology for the video of the graves at the military cemetery. There's no way this is an 'unfortunate editorial error'. Netanyahu appointed himself at the beginning of the election campaign as the campaign's strategic director. He is obsessive about his relationship with the media and its use, always involved down to the last detail, and no action goes without his approval. The final frame of the propaganda video is the most important frame in it".

On 1 March 2019, three days after the video was posted, Avishai Ivri apologized on his Facebook page "to every bereaved family which was hurt by the video".

The original version of the video was watched on the "Likud" website by less than 40,000 people, before it was removed. After it was shown on the news broadcasts on television channels and on news websites, hundreds of thousands additional viewers watched the video.

On 12 March 2019, Channel 13 revealed that due to the production of the video, Avishai Ivri was fired from his position at the Likud headquarters. Avi Cohen, the advisor who was suspended with him, resigned. No proceedings were taken against those who were responsible for approving the video for broadcast, but did not watch it before it was broadcast.

== October 7 attacks ==
On 7 October 2023, Hamas and other Palestinian militant groups launched coordinated armed incursions from the Gaza Strip into the Gaza Envelope of the southern Israel, the first invasion into the Israeli territory since the 1948 Arab–Israeli War. The attacks, which coincided with the Jewish religious holiday Simchat Torah, initiated the ongoing Gaza war.

On 7 October 2023, Benny Gantz was not in the coalition government of Netanyahu, but joined the government on 12 October 2023.

The words which Ivri said in the graves video were:

All the left-wing governments in the last twenty years have taken very big bets on the security of the country. Bets which have failed. You know the procedure, they give in to international pressure, withdraw from the territories and hand them over to Arab control, which creates entire countries of terror on our doorstep and sometimes inside our home. More and more violence, more and more deaths. This is the meaning of the left-wing rule [...] First the terrible attacks and the suicide terror, then the Hamas state in Gaza and the Iranian branch in Lebanon [...] and the Israeli public has already understood what a left-wing government means, and is not willing to be a guinea pig at the cost of hundreds of deaths. So they try to hide and obscure it. But the public is not stupid.

— Avishai Ivri, The graves video
