= Eli Ben-Dahan =

Israeli politician (born 1954)

- אלי בן־דהן
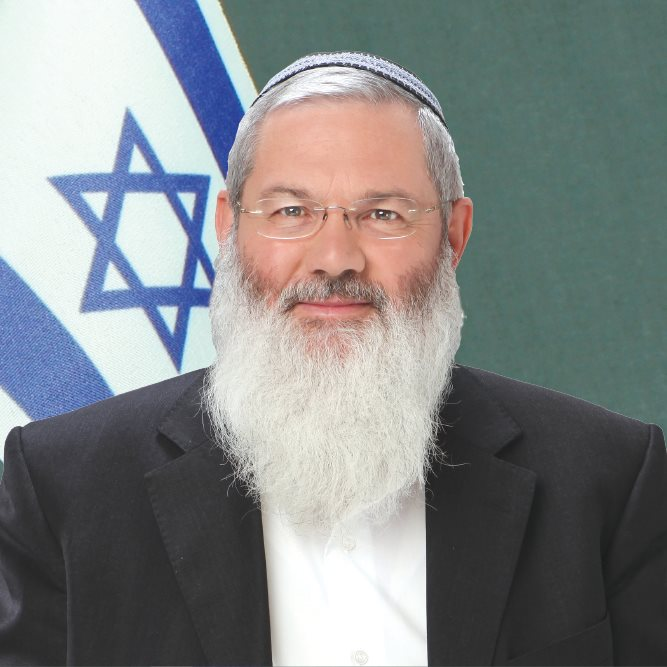

Faction represented in the Knesset
- 2013–2019: The Jewish Home
- 2019: Likud
- 2019: Ahi

Personal details
- Born: 11 February 1954 (age 72) Casablanca, Morocco

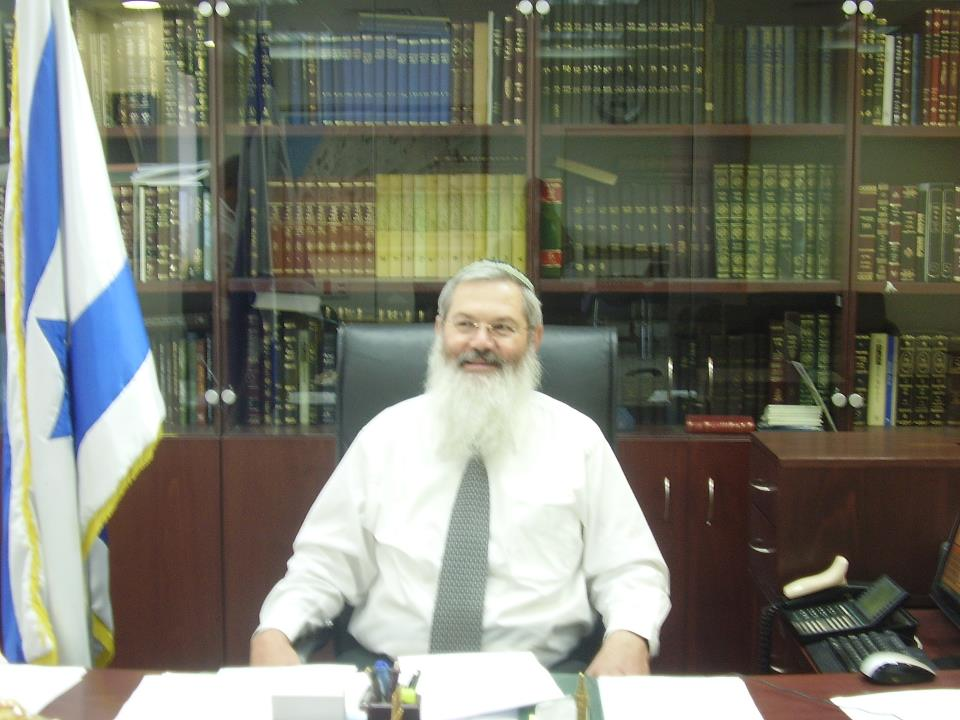
Eli Ben-Dahan

Eliyahu Michael "Eli" Ben-Dahan (Hebrew: אליהו "אלי" מיכאל בן־דהן; born 11 February 1954) is an Israeli Orthodox rabbi and politician. He most recently served as a member of the Knesset for Ahi and Deputy Minister of Defense. In that position, he was responsible for "pre-military training academies, hesder program which combine military service and yeshiva study, military conversion programs, legislation between Israeli law and the military rule in Judea-Samaria, and to deal with public infrastructure in Judea-Samaria".

He was previously a Knesset member for the Jewish Home and Likud from 2013 until 2019, and Deputy Minister of Religious Services between 2013 and 2015.

== Early life ==
The eldest of five boys, Ben-Dahan was born in Casablanca, Morocco, and immigrated to Israel in 1956 at the age of two, his family settling in Beersheba. He studied at the Nativ Meir and Mercaz HaRav yeshivas, and is an ordained rabbi. During his national service in the IDF, he became a major in the Artillery Corps. He later went on to gain a teaching certificate, a bachelor's degree in business administration from Touro College, and a master's degree in public policy from the Hebrew University of Jerusalem. He was ordained by Rabbis Chalom Messas, Avraham Shapira, and Mordechai Eliyahu.

== Career ==
In 1978, Ben-Dahan was amongst the founders of the Haspin settlement in the Golan Heights. In 1983, he moved to Beit El settlement in the West Bank after being asked by Rabbi Mordechai Eliyahu, then Chief Rabbi of Israel, to manage his office. He became Director-General of the Chief Rabbinate of Israel's Rabbinical Court system in 1989, holding the post for 21 years. During his tenure as director of the rabbinical courts, he promoted legislation to enact punitive sanctions on husbands who refused their wives a get (bill of divorce), had the divorce process streamlined, and promoted the introduction of female advocates into the rabbinical courts.

Prior to the 2013 Knesset elections, he was placed fourth on the Jewish Home list, entering the Knesset, as the party won twelve seats. Following the elections, he was appointed Deputy Minister of Religious Services in the new government. He was re-elected in 2015, after being placed fourth on the party's list again. He was subsequently appointed Deputy Minister of Defense in the new government.

In remarks to graduates of a pre-military academy, Ben-Dahan said, "Your most important task is to increase the spiritual strength and protection of the IDF."

In the run-up to the April 2019 Knesset elections, Ben-Dahan left the Jewish Home and joined the defunct Ahi party in order to run on the Likud list. The switch was intended to avoid election restrictions on allowing a candidate from another party competing in elections to run on another party's list.

== Personal life ==
Ben-Dahan lives in Har Homa in East Jerusalem, and is married, with ten children.

== Political views ==
Ben-Dahan has stirred controversy with some of his statements, which were cited after his appointment to administer the IDF's civil administration in the West Bank, with jurisdiction over Palestinian residents there:

In 2013, while discussing the resumption of peace talks in a radio interview, Ben-Dahan said: "To me, they [Palestinians] are like animals, they are not human." He further remarked that "the Palestinians aren't educated towards peace, nor do they want it".

In June 2015, Ben-Dahan also spoke out after a report in The Wall Street Journal claimed Israel used a computer virus to spy on nuclear negotiations with Iran. "The deputy defense minister called the allegations 'nonsense', and assured the interviewer that Israel had other ways of gathering intelligence, and didn't need to resort to hacking."

In July 2015, after a Palestinian youth was shot dead for throwing stones, Ben-Dahan spoke out in defense of the IDF commander, "Throwing stones is terrorism. Stones kill. The Binyamin Brigade commander was acting in self-defense."

In August 2016, after soldiers were ordered to no longer assist migrants in conjunction with NGO Elifelet, Ben-Dahan spoke out in defense of the decision: "These people have infiltrated into Israel, taken Israelis' jobs, and made south Tel Aviv an impossible place to live." He explained that "Israeli soldiers should volunteer for programs that benefit Israeli citizens".

On 18 November 2018, the Jewish Home Party revealed that Netanyahu had made a decision on 15 November 2018, to remove Ben-Dahan as Deputy Defense Minister. Ben-Dahan also released a separate statement criticizing Netanyahu. Netanyahu fended off an attempt to hold a vote in Knesset to reinstate Ben-Dahan, who was required by government protocol to resign when Defense Minister Avigdor Lieberman officially resigned on 18 November. Despite briefly removing Ben-Dahan from his government, Netanyahu soon gave into pressure from the Jewish Home, and re-appointed Ben-Dahan as Deputy Defense Minister.
