= Rafi Peretz =

Israeli rabbi and former politician

- רפי פרץ
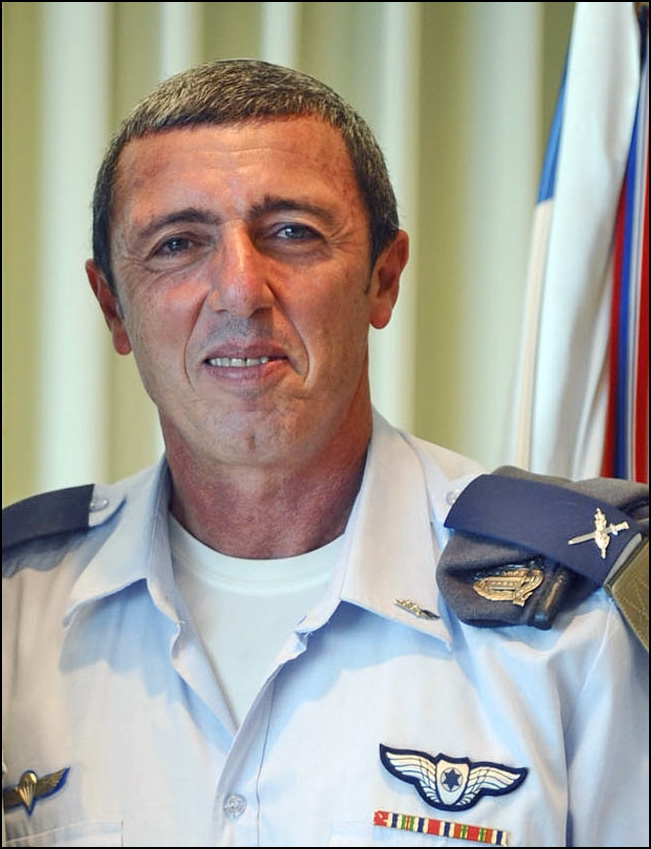

Ministerial roles
- 2019–2020: Minister of Education
- 2020–2021: Minister of Jerusalem Affairs

Faction represented in the Knesset
- 2019: Union of Right-Wing Parties
- 2019: Yamina
- 2019–2020: Jewish Home–National Union
- 2020: Yamina
- 2020–2021: Jewish Home

Other roles
- 2010–2016: Chief Military Rabbi

Personal details
- Born: 7 January 1956 (age 70) Jerusalem, Israel

Rafael "Rafi" Peretz (Hebrew: רפאל "רפי" פרץ; born 7 January 1956) is an Israeli Orthodox rabbi and former politician. A former military officer and helicopter pilot who also served as the Chief Military Rabbi of the Israel Defense Forces, he was the leader of the Jewish Home party. Peretz was a member of the Knesset for the Yamina alliance until he separated from the faction in order to join the Netanyahu-led government.

== Early life ==
Peretz was born in Jerusalem, to parents of Moroccan-Jewish descent. He grew up in the Kiryat HaYovel neighborhood of Western Jerusalem.

He studied at Mercaz HaRav, and then Yeshivat HaKotel; he received semikhah (ordination) from the Chief Rabbinate of Israel.

== Military career ==
Prior to being promoted to the rank of brigadier general, Peretz was the head of the Otzem Pre-Military Academy in Yated, which was relocated from Bnei Atzmon, where he established it in 1993, and a major (reserves) in the Israeli Air Force, where he served as a helicopter pilot. He succeeded Rabbi Avichai Rontzki as Chief Military Rabbi in mid-2010, serving in the post until 2016.

In November 2014, at a tense time in Jerusalem, Peretz caused a public controversy by announcing that the Temple Mount has no religious significance to the Muslim religion. He was quoted as saying, "Ninety percent of the Arabs don't know a thing about the Koran. I tell you with full authority. We know better than many of them." The IDF quickly distanced itself from the rabbi's statements, and stated: "The rabbi is sorry if his remarks offended the Arab population." Ynet characterized Peretz's comments as "explosive".

== Political career ==
Peretz was elected to lead the Jewish Home party on 4 February 2019. The party joined the Union of the Right-Wing Parties alliance for the April 2019 Knesset elections, with Peretz as the alliance's lead candidate. He was elected to the Knesset as the coalition won five seats.

In 2019, Peretz was appointed the interim Minister of Education.

In May 2019, Peretz compared Jewish intermarriage in the United States to a "second Holocaust". Jonathan Greenblatt, director of the Anti-Defamation League, said that Peretz' remark "trivializes the Shoah [Holocaust]".

Peretz attracted further criticism from within the government and Israeli society in July 2019, when he endorsed gay conversion therapy, and claimed to have personally performed such therapy. Prime Minister Benjamin Netanyahu rejected Peretz's comments as "unacceptable". On July 18, 2019, Peretz said, after protests, that he rejected gay conversion therapy.

In an interview published on 10 January 2020, Peretz told the Israeli daily Yedioth Ahronoth, "In the religious public that lives according to the Torah, a normal family is a man and a woman. [We] don’t need to be ashamed that we live in this natural way", The Times of Israel reported, adding that his comments drew criticism of Israeli LGBT activists and politicians by "suggesting gay marriage was not natural".

In May 2020, as Yamina switched to the opposition before the formation of the Netanyahu–Gantz unity government, Peretz resigned from Yamina and joined the Netanyahu government as the "Minister of Jerusalem Affairs and Heritage".

In January 2021, he announced his retirement from politics.

== Personal life ==
Peretz is married, and has 12 children. He lived in the Gush Katif settlement of Bnei Atzmon prior to the Israeli disengagement from Gaza in 2005, and now lives in Naveh, a village established in 2008 by former residents of Gush Katif. On 1 August 2020, Peretz tested positive for COVID-19.
