= Zevulun Orlev =

Israeli politician

- זבולון אורלב
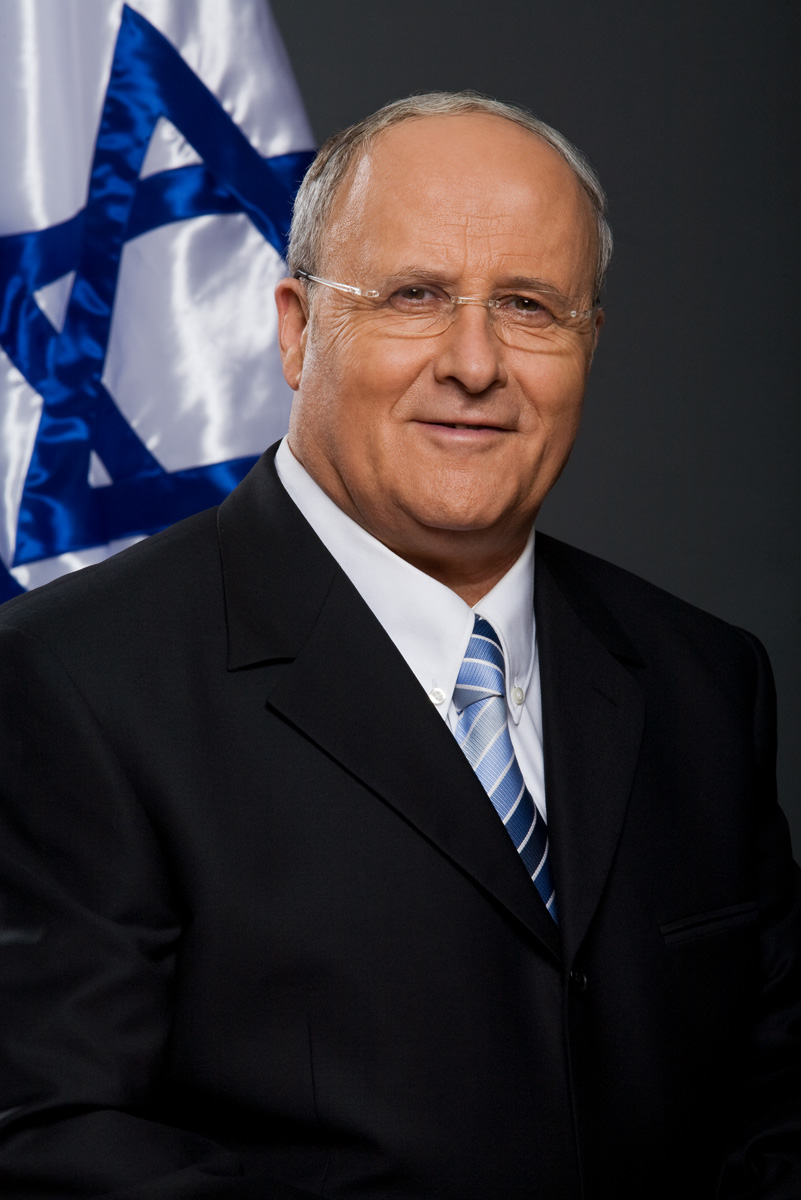

Ministerial roles
- 2003–2004: Minister of Welfare & Social Services

Faction represented in the Knesset
- 1999–2009: National Religious Party
- 2009–2013: The Jewish Home

Personal details
- Born: 9 November 1945 (age 80) Rehovot, Mandatory Palestine

Zevulun Orlev (Hebrew: זבולון אורלב; born 9 November 1945) is an Israeli politician and a former Knesset member, Minister of Welfare & Social Services and leader of the National Religious Party. Orlev is a decorated war hero who received the Medal of Distinguished Service in the Yom Kippur War.

== Biography ==
Zevulun Orlev was born in Rehovot during the Mandate era. He studied humanities and social sciences at the Hebrew University of Jerusalem and then trained to be a teacher at Moreshet Yaakov College. Orlev lives in Jerusalem's Givat Mordechai neighborhood with his wife, Nira. They have four children.

== Military career ==
During his national service in the Israel Defense Forces, he reached the rank of Sergeant. Orlev fought in the Six-Day War, participating in the capture of East Jerusalem. He sustained a knee injury and underwent rehabilitation for two years. During the Yom Kippur War, Orlev served in a stronghold on the Bar-Lev Line. During the Egyptian attack on the first day of the war, Orlev took charge of the soldiers in his outpost after the commander was wounded. Under his command, his unit repelled Egyptian attempts to capture the position, and he organized the evacuation from the stronghold. For this, he was awarded a Medal of Distinguished Service. He later served as a reservist during the 1982 Lebanon War.

== Public service ==
Orlev worked as Director General of the Ministry of Religious Affairs and Director General of the Ministry of Education and Culture.

== Political career ==
He was first elected to the Knesset in the 1999 elections on the National Religious Party list. After being re-elected in the 2003 elections, Orlev was appointed Minister of Welfare and Social Services in Ariel Sharon's government. During the crisis in the party over the Gaza disengagement plan, Orlev led the camp which believed staying in the government, rather than leaving the coalition, was the best option. In response, NRP leader Effi Eitam called Orlev a "Meimadnik". When Eitam and Yitzhak Levy quit the government in 2004, Orlev and many NRP members refused to leave the coalition. Orlev then succeeded in taking control of the party, resulting in Eitam and Levy leaving to form the Renewed Religious National Zionist Party (later renamed Ahi), which would later join the National Union.

Orlev was re-elected in the 2006 elections. Prior to the 2009 elections the NRP was dissolved and its members joined the Jewish Home. Orlev won second place on the new party's list, and retained his seat in the subsequent elections.

In 2009 Orlev sponsored a Private member's bill that called for a years imprisonment for any person who denied Israel to be a Jewish and democratic state, a law that would have criminalized calls by members of the Arab minority for Israel to be a state for all its citizens. The bill was castigated as racist and discriminatory, and a media outcry following the bill passing its first reading in the Knesset led to the bill ultimately being defeated. The bill was criticized as an exercise in thought police and as being an assault on freedom of speech, and called "racist and fascist" by the High Follow-Up Committee for Arab Citizens of Israel. The Mossawa Center described the bill as "discriminatory and racist". Uri Avnery placed the bill in the context as being one in a series of racist laws, writing that it "does not stand out at all in today’s political landscape", describing Orlev's Jewish Home party as "ultra-ultra-ultra racist" and trying to outdo the other right-wing parties.

Orlev was criticized for proposing a bill that would mandate divorced fathers to pay child support until their children reached age 22, though he later retracted and stated he would not pursue the bill.

In 2012, he called for the Third Temple to be built in Jerusalem, as well as legislation to protect the project from prosecution and the "hostile, secular, left-wing media". He also proposed a Private Members Bill to override an Israeli Supreme Court ruling ordering the demolition five buildings in an Israeli settlement.

Orlev announced that he would retire from politics after he ran unsuccessfully in the 2012 The Jewish Home leadership election. Orlev did not run in the 2013 elections.

He is a co-president of the international Mizrachi movement, which the National Religious Party and its successor Jewish Home represents in the political arena.
