= Yaakov Amidror =

Israeli general and National Security Advisor

- יעקב עמידרור
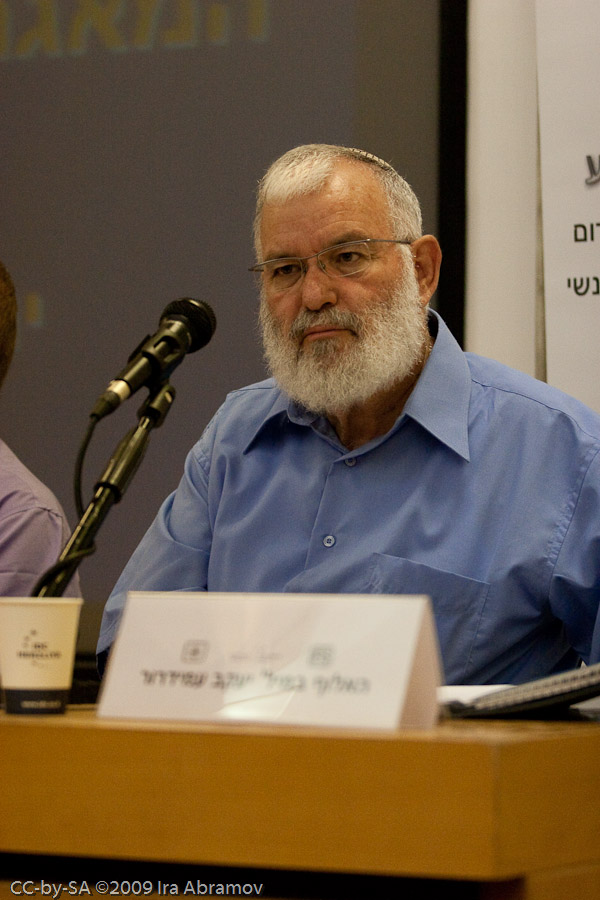
- Yaakov Amidror in 2009
- Born: 15 May 1948 (age 78); Yad Eliyahu, Israel
- Military career
- Allegiance: Israel
- Branch: Israel Defense Forces
- Rank: Major general
- Unit: Paratroopers Brigade
- Conflicts: Six-Day War; War of Attrition; Yom Kippur War
- Other work: Former National Security Advisor

Yaakov Amidror (Hebrew: יעקב עמידרור; born 15 May 1948) is a former major general and National Security Advisor of Israel and was also the head of the Research Department of Israeli military intelligence. Today, he is the Anne and Greg Rosshandler Senior Fellow at the Jerusalem Institute for Strategic Studies, a conservative security think tank.

== Biography ==
=== Background ===
Amidror was born in Yad Eliyahu, Israel, on the day after the Israeli Declaration of Independence. His father, Leo, had enlisted in the British Army during World War II, and spent five years in German captivity after being taken prisoner in Greece. His mother, Tzila, was an Irgun member, active in the organization's finance department, who had been arrested by the British in 1941, and incarcerated at the Bethlehem Women's Prison.

=== Military career ===
Amidror was drafted into the Israel Defense Forces in 1966. He volunteered as a paratrooper in the Paratroopers Brigade. He served as a soldier and a squad leader, and fought in the Gaza Strip during the Six-Day War. He became an infantry officer after completing Officer Candidate School and returned to the Paratroopers Brigade as a platoon leader. Afterwards he transferred to the Military Intelligence Directorate and served in various positions such as a regional brigade Intelligence officer during the War of Attrition, the 162nd Division Intelligence officer during the Yom Kippur War, the Northern Command Intelligence officer, and as the head of the Research Department. Amidror was considered a candidate to lead the Military Intelligence Directorate, but he was passed over after he controversially referred to non-religious Israelis as "Hebrew-speaking gentiles". Instead, he became president of Israel's National Defense College before retiring from his military career in 2002.

=== Political career ===
Amidror was selected to draw up the list of candidates for the Religious Zionist The Jewish Home party in the lead-up to the elections for the 18th Knesset. Amidror became enmeshed in internecine fighting within the party, and with competing right-wing factions. He clashed particularly with MK Uri Ariel, calling him a "liar" and a "cheater".

He was appointed to lead Israel's National Security Council in May 2011 and held the position until November 2013.

As Israel's national security advisor, he participated in high-level talks with U.S. officials about the Iranian nuclear program and led efforts to restore relations with Turkey after the 2010 Gaza flotilla raid incident.

Amidror is considered a hawk on security matters. He wrote an op-ed in The New York Times opposing the Geneva interim agreement on the Iranian nuclear program. However, he has also warned privately that Israel's settlement policy was isolating it from the international community.

In 2014, Amidror joined the Begin-Sadat Center for Strategic Studies. In 2017, he became the Anne and Greg Rosshandler Senior Fellow at the Jerusalem Institute for Strategic Studies.

In 2016, Amidror chaired an official panel charged with providing recommendations to improve the functioning of Israel's National Security Council and cabinet ministers during wartime.

In June 2020, Amidror cautioned against Netanyahu's plan to annex portions of the West Bank.
