= Daniel Hershkowitz =

Israeli politician, mathematician and rabbi (born 1953)

- דניאל הרשקוביץ
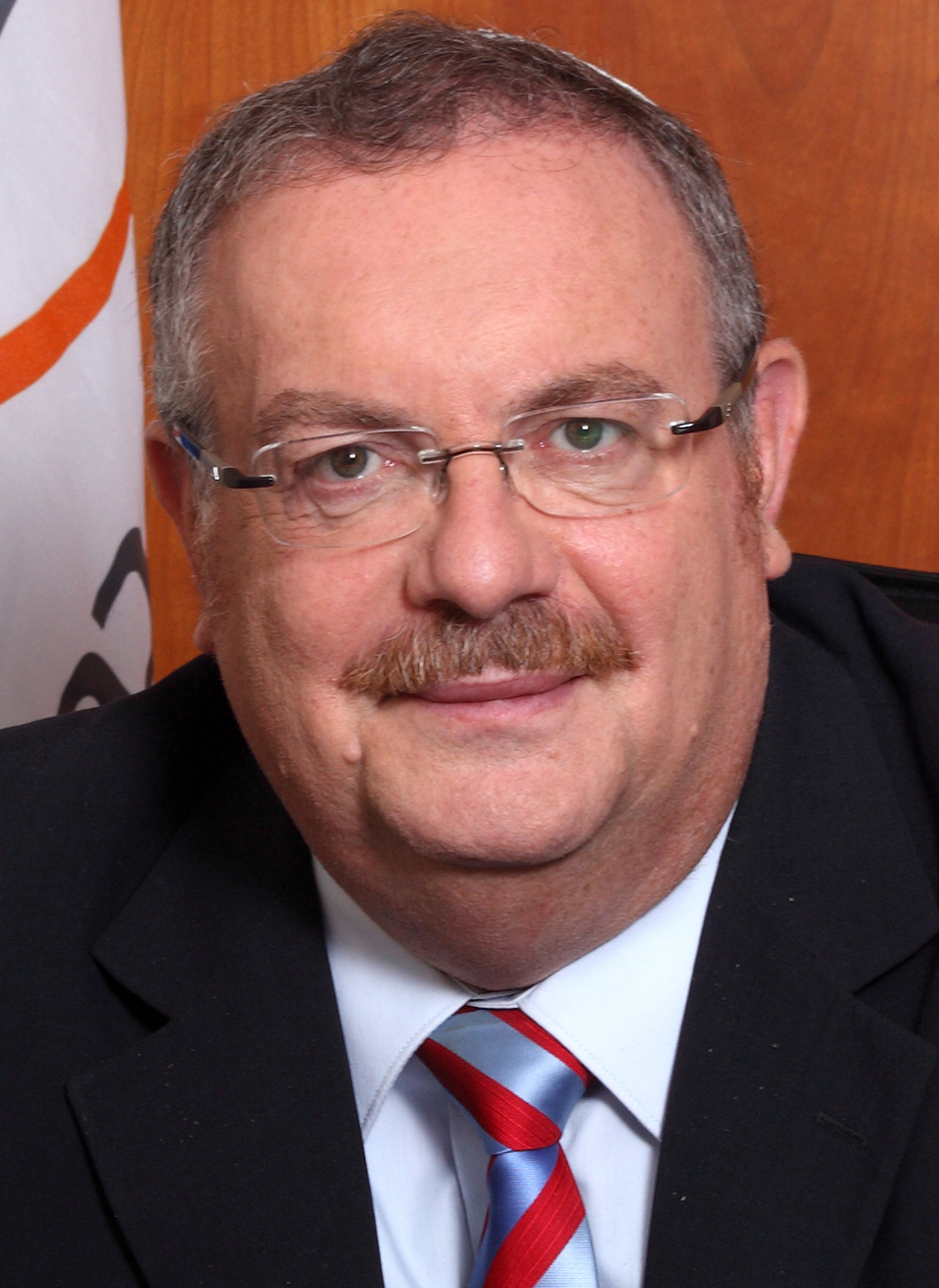

Ministerial roles
- 2009–2013: Minister of Science & Technology

Faction represented in the Knesset
- 2009–2013: The Jewish Home

Personal details
- Born: 2 January 1953 (age 72); Haifa, Israel

Daniel Hershkowitz (Hebrew: דניאל הרשקוביץ; born 2 January 1953 in Haifa, Israel) is an Israeli politician, mathematician, and Orthodox rabbi. Since 2018, he has headed the Israel Civil Service Commission. He is professor emeritus of mathematics at the Technion, and is also rabbi of the Ahuza neighborhood in Haifa. He was president of Bar-Ilan University from 2013-17.

== Early life ==
Hershkowitz was born in Haifa. His parents were Holocaust survivors from Hungary, and his father was wounded in the 1948 Arab-Israeli War. Hershkowitz studied at a religious high school, and graduated at age 16. He served for five years in the Intelligence Corps of the Israel Defense Forces, reaching the rank of Major.

Hershkowitz earned his BSc in mathematics in 1973, MSc in 1976, and DSc in 1982, all from the Technion – Israel Institute of Technology. His yeshiva studies were conducted at Mercaz HaRav; he received his Semikha (ordination) in 1995 from Rabbis She'ar Yashuv Cohen, Shlomo Chelouche, and Nehemyah Roth, as well as an additional ordination "Rabbi of the City" from the Chief Rabbinate of Israel (2001).

== Academia ==
He has published over 80 mathematics articles in academic journals. He was President of the International Linear Algebra Society (2002-2008), and was previously a Professor of Mathematics at the University of Wisconsin–Madison. In 1982, he was awarded the Landau Research Prize in Mathematics; in 1990, the New England Academic Award for Excellence in Research; in 1990, the Technion's Award for Excellence in Teaching; and in 1991, the Henri Gutwirth Award for Promotion of Research.

== Political career ==
In 2009, he was elected to the Knesset as the leader of the Jewish Home, and was appointed Minister of Science and Technology after joining Benjamin Netanyahu's government. He did not contest the 2013 elections, and subsequently left the Knesset. Since September 2018, he is the Head of the Civil Service Commission under the office of the Prime Minister of Israel.

== Bar-Ilan University ==
He was president of Bar-Ilan University from 2013 to 2017, succeeding Moshe Kaveh and followed by Arie Zaban.

Party political offices
Preceded by Position established	Leader of the Jewish Home; 2008–2012	Succeeded by Naftali Bennett
