= Constitution, Law and Justice Committee =

Israeli Knesset committee

The Constitution, Law and Justice Committee (or Constitution Committee for short) of the Knesset is one of the permanent Knesset committees. The committee deals with the state's constitution, the basic laws, the usual laws concerning legal procedures and questions from the fields of law, and laws such as elections and more.

== Chairmen ==
Portrait	Chairman	Took office	Left office	Party	Ref.
Nahum Nir	Nahum Nir (1884–1968)	1949	1951	Mapam	
Moshe Unna	Moshe Unna (1902–1989)	1951	1955	Hapoel HaMizrachi	
Zerah Warhaftig	Zerah Warhaftig	1955	1956	Mafdal	
Nahum Nir	Nahum Nir (1884–1968)	1956	1959	Ahdut HaAvoda	
Zerah Warhaftig	Zerah Warhaftig	1959	1961	Mafdal	
Moshe Unna	Moshe Unna (1902–1989)	1961	1966	Mafdal	
Yitzhak Raphael	Yitzhak Raphael	1966	1969	Mafdal	
Shlomo-Yisrael Ben-Meir	Shlomo-Yisrael Ben-Meir	1969	1971	Mafdal	
Yosef Goldschmidt	Yosef Goldschmidt	1971	1974	Mafdal	
Zerach Warhaftig	Zerach Warhaftig	1974	1977	Mafdal	
David Glass	David Glass	1977	1981	Mafdal	
Eliezer Kulas	Eliezer Kulas	1981	1988	Likud	
Uriel Lynn	Uriel Lynn	1989	1992	Likud	
David Zucker	David Zucker	1992	1996	Meretz	
Shaul Yahalom	Shaul Yahalom	1996	1998	Mafdal	
Hanan Porat	Hanan Porat	1998	1999	Mafdal	
Amnon Rubinstein	Amnon Rubinstein	1999	2001	Meretz	
Ophir Pines-Paz	Ophir Pines-Paz	2001	2002	Labor	
Michael Eitan	Michael Eitan	2002	2006	Likud	
Menachem Ben-Sasson	Menachem Ben-Sasson	2006	2009	Kadima	
David Rotem	David Rotem	2009	2015	Yisrael Beiteinu	
Nissan Slomiansky	Nissan Slomiansky	2015	2019	Jewish Home	
Ya'akov Asher	Ya'akov Asher	2020	2021	UTJ	
Gilad Kariv	Gilad Kariv	2021	2022	Labor	
Simcha Rothman	Simcha Rothman	2022	Present	Religious Zionist	
