= Uri Ariel =

Israeli politician

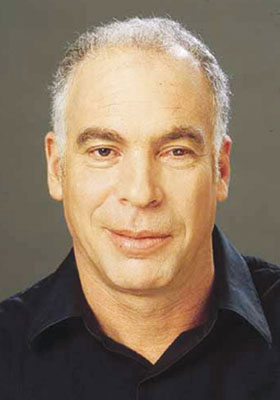

Ministerial roles
- 2013–2015: Minister of Construction
- 2015–2019: Minister of Agriculture

Faction represented in the Knesset
- 2001–2013: National Union
- 2013–2019: The Jewish Home

Personal details
- Born: 22 December 1952 (age 73) Afula, Northern District, Israel

Uri Yehuda Ariel (Hebrew: אורי אריאל; born 22 December 1952) is an Israeli politician who formerly served as a member of the Knesset for The Jewish Home (within which he chaired the Tkuma faction), and as Minister of Agriculture and Rural Development.

== Biography ==
Uri Ariel was born in Afula, and grew up on kibbutz Tirat Zvi, which his father had helped found. He attended school in Sde Eliyahu, and was conscripted into the Israel Defense Forces in 1971. Ariel served in Palsar 7, the reconnaissance company of the 7th Armored Brigade, and retired as a major. He became involved in Israeli settlements, and served as secretary general of both the Amana settlement movement and the Yesha Council, as well as head of Beit El local council. He was also a member of the Jewish National Fund directorate.

Ariel is married, with 6 children.

== Political career ==
For the 1999 Knesset elections, he was placed seventh on the National Union list. Although he missed out when the party won only four seats, Ariel entered the Knesset on 17 October 2001 as a replacement for the assassinated Rehavam Ze'evi.

He was placed sixth on the alliance's list for the 2003 elections, and retained his seat when the party won seven mandates. Prior to the scheduled Israeli withdrawal from the Gaza Strip and the northern West Bank in August 2005, Ariel moved to Kfar Darom in solidarity, and he firmly opposed the plan. Similarly, he also moved to Amona prior to the dismantling of the outpost.

Originally placed fifth on the National Union Knesset list for the 2006 elections, Ariel conceded his spot to Aryeh Eldad, and was listed 6th. After the alliance agreed to run a joint list with the National Religious Party, Ariel was placed ninth, and retained his seat as the party won nine mandates.

During the Sukkot festival in 2006, Ariel ascended to the Temple Mount, saying he was preparing a plan to build a synagogue on the mount. The proposed synagogue would not be built instead of the mosques, but in a separate area, in accordance with rulings of the prominent Rabbis. Ariel said he believed that this would be correcting a historical injustice, and that it is an opportunity for the Muslim world to prove that it is tolerant to other faiths.

In March 2008, Ariel opposed the Knesset House Committee's decision to let Angela Merkel deliver her speech to the Knesset in German. In this context, he also referred to the German people as "the mother of all Amalekites".

For the 2009 elections, Ariel was placed second on the National Union list, retaining his seat as the party won four mandates.

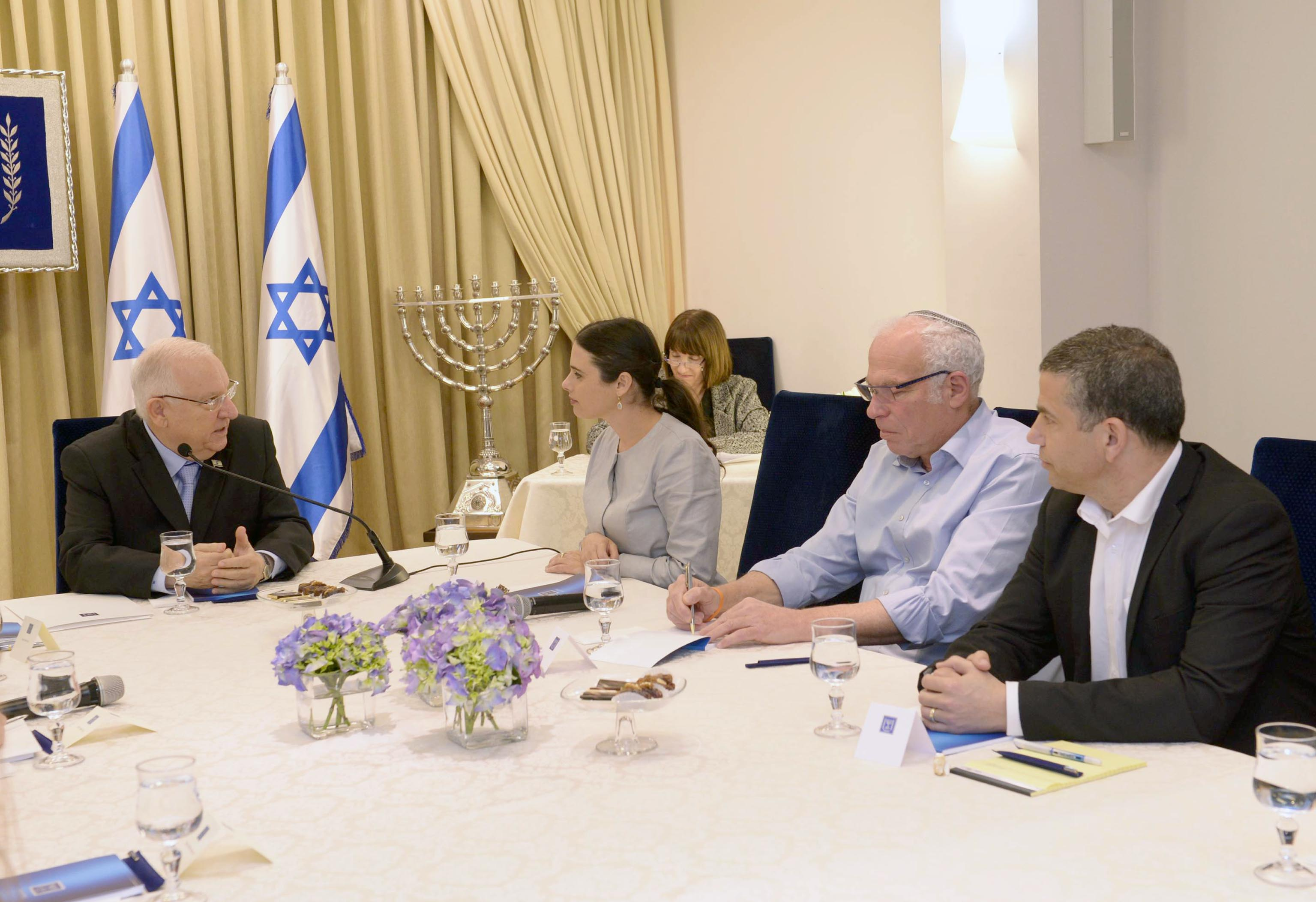
With Reuven Rivlin and Ayelet Shaked

After Hilltop Youth attacked an Israeli army base in 2011, Ariel protested Israeli officials who called the group "terrorists", and condemned calls for the use of lethal force to repel such attacks in the future. In January 2012, Ariel admitted to giving IDF troop movement information to such militants in order to facilitate disruption of army activities, saying, "If a person who transfers information about IDF movements is a spy, then I am a spy".

Ariel was ranked by the settler NGO Matot Arim as the most effective right-wing MK in 2011, and the second most right-wing in 2012. In 2011, he was the sponsor of a Knesset bill which would ban the use of Nazi references, except in certain situations, such as teaching, documentation, or if the reference is found to have been correct. In December 2014, a group of academics called on the United States and European Union to impose sanctions on Ariel and three other Israelis "who lead efforts to insure permanent Israeli occupation of the West Bank and to annex all or parts of it unilaterally in violation of international law".

Following the 2015 elections, Ariel was appointed Minister of Agriculture and Rural Development.

In July 2013, Ariel said, "We need to state clearly that there won't be a Palestinian state west of the Jordan River." In 2014 he said “Between the Jordan River and the Mediterranean Sea there will be only one state, which is Israel”. In January 2016, he called on the government to annex Area C of the West Bank during a tour of the West Bank led by the Knesset Land for Israel Caucus.

In January 2019, Ariel was ousted as Tkuma leader by MK Bezalel Smotrich. Following his defeat, Ariel announced he would not seek re-election to the Knesset in the April 2019 Israeli legislative election. The election yielded an Interim government, and Ariel subsequently resigned as Agriculture Minister in November 2019 at Benjamin Netanyahu's request. Following his retirement, Ariel was appointed chairman of the East Jerusalem Development Company in December 2020.

Party political offices
Preceded by Ya'akov Katz	Leader of Tkuma; 2012–2019	Succeeded by Bezalel Smotrich
