= Zvi Hendel =

Israeli politician (born 1949)

- צבי הנדל
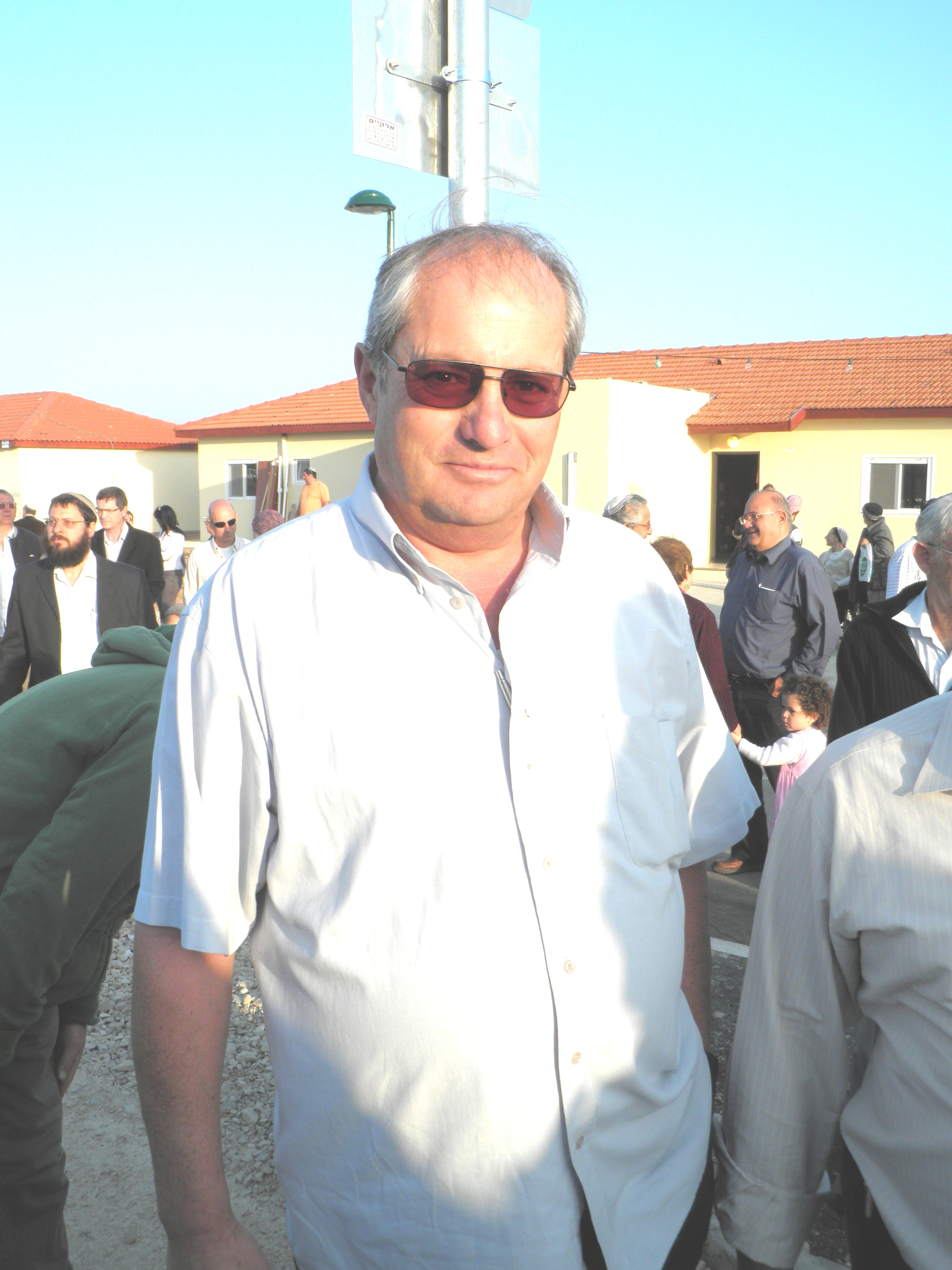

Faction represented in the Knesset
- 1996–1999: National Religious Party
- 1999: Tkuma
- 1999–2009: National Union

Personal details
- Born: 16 October 1949 (age 76) Romania

Zvi Hendel (Hebrew: צבי הנדל; born 16 October 1949) is an Israeli politician who served as a member of the Knesset for the Tkuma faction of the National Union between 1996 and 2009.

== Biography ==
Born in Transylvania, Romania, Hendel immigrated to Israel in 1959 and served as a Gadna instructor during his military service. In his reserve duty he served as part of a reconnaissance unit in the Israeli Artillery Corps and took part in the Yom Kippur War.

In 1977, he moved with his family to the Israeli settlement of Ganei Tal, part of the Gush Katif bloc in the Gaza Strip.

=== Political career ===
In the early 1990s, Hendel was elected to the head of the Hof Aza Regional Council, and was first elected to the 14th Knesset in 1996 as a National Religious Party representative. Towards the end of his term, he left the party along with Hanan Porat and formed the "Emunim" faction, which soon after changed its name to Tkuma. As part of the Tkuma party, he joined the National Union list, and was elected to the fifteenth, sixteenth, and seventeenth Knessets.

In the 15th Knesset, he served as chairman of the Aliyah, Absorption, and Diaspora committee.

During Ariel Sharon's second term as Prime Minister of Israel, Hendel served as Deputy Minister of Education, Culture, and Sports until the National Union party was dismissed from the coalition on 6 June 2004 prior to a vote on the disengagement plan.

A significant part of his parliamentary career was devoted to efforts for the residents of Gush Katif (where he himself resided), and strengthening the right wing in the Knesset. In this context, he also coined the phrase "כעומק החקירה, כך עומק העקירה" ("As deep the investigation is, so is the uprooting"), commenting on the legal investigations ongoing against Sharon at the same time Sharon changed his political views and decided on the Disengagement Plan.

Hendel also served as head of the Agricultural caucus in the Knesset.

In 2005, Hendel was evicted from his home along with fellow residents of Ganei Tal as part of the Disengagement Plan. Him and his family's dealing with the eviction was the subject of the documentaries "Katif", and "Last Katif".

In 2006, Hendel submitted a bill proposal that would tie an oath of loyalty to "a Jewish and democratic Israel" and to the laws of Israel, to the right to vote. The Bill was turned down by a vote of 45–17.

He lost his seat in the 2009 elections.

After Knesset, he became the head of the Israel Anti-Drug Authority. In this role, he vigorously opposed cannabis legalization and was criticized for a dispute with Knesset member Tamar Zandberg.

Party political offices
Preceded by Hanan Porat	Leader of Tkuma; 1999–2009	Succeeded by Ya'akov Katz
