= 2019 National Union–Tkuma leadership election =

- 14 January 2019
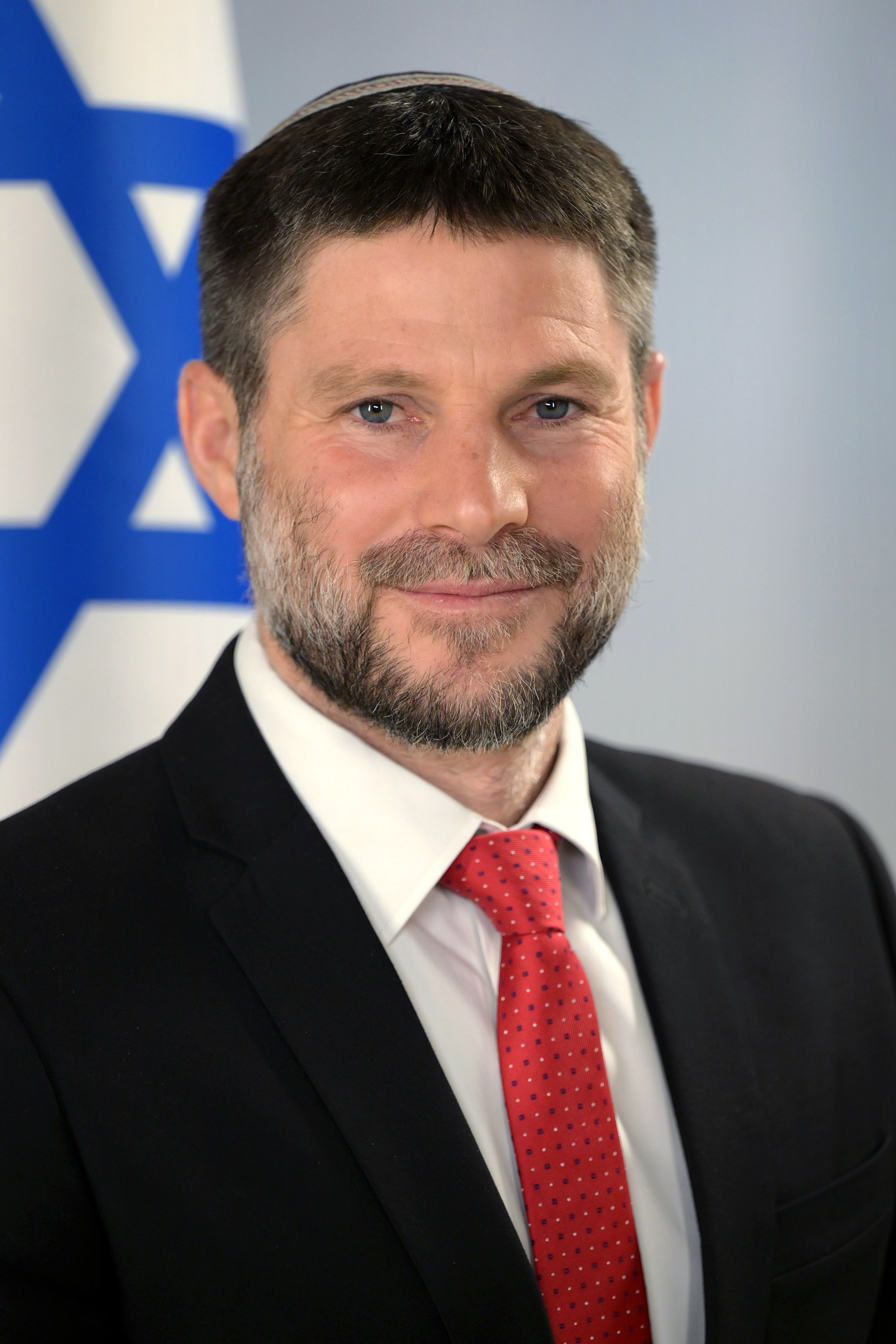

| Candidate | Bezalel Smotrich | Uri Ariel |
| Party | National Union–Tkuma | National Union–Tkuma |
| Popular vote | 83 | 40 |
| Percentage | 67.47% | 32.52% |
Leader before election
Uri Ariel
Elected Leader
Bezalel Smotrich

The 2019 National Union–Tkuma leadership election was held on 14 January 2019 to elect the leader of the Israeli political party National Union–Tkuma. Incumbent leader Uri Ariel was defeated by Bezalel Smotrich.

== Background ==
In November 2012 Uri Ariel was elected to lead the National Union, a union of right wing parties that Ariel's Tkuma was part of. Ariel was reelected unopposed to head National Union–Tkuma. Under Ariel the party ran as part of The Jewish Home. The elections were moved up after Naftali Bennett and Ayelet Shaked announced in December that they would be leaving the Jewish Home party and launching the New Right, leaving the Religious Zionist parties in need of new leadership, which Smotrich declared that he would take on.

Alongside the leadership elections the party also held elections for its Knesset list, with 10 candidates competing, including former MK Orit Strock and National Union secretary general Ofir Sofer.

The elections took place at the Crowne Plaza Hotel in Jerusalem.

== Candidates ==
- Uri Ariel, incumbent party leader
- Bezalel Smotrich, Member of the Knesset for National Union–Tkuma since 2015. In December 2018 he announced that he would challenge Uri Ariel for the leadership of the National Union.

== Electorate ==
The elections were held in the party's central committee, which was expanded from 35 to 120 members in 2015. Many of the members that joined the committee in 2015 were handpicked by Smotrich. The central committee had 128 members.

== Results ==
2019 National Union–Tkuma leadership election
| Party | Candidate | Votes | % |
|---|---|---|---|
| National Union–Tkuma | Bezalel Smotrich | 83 | 67.47 |
| National Union–Tkuma | Uri Ariel (incumbent) | 40 | 32.52 |

Ariel resigned from the Knesset following his defeat.
