= Moshe Solomon =

Israeli politician (born 1975)

- מֹשֶׁה סוֹלוֹמוֹן
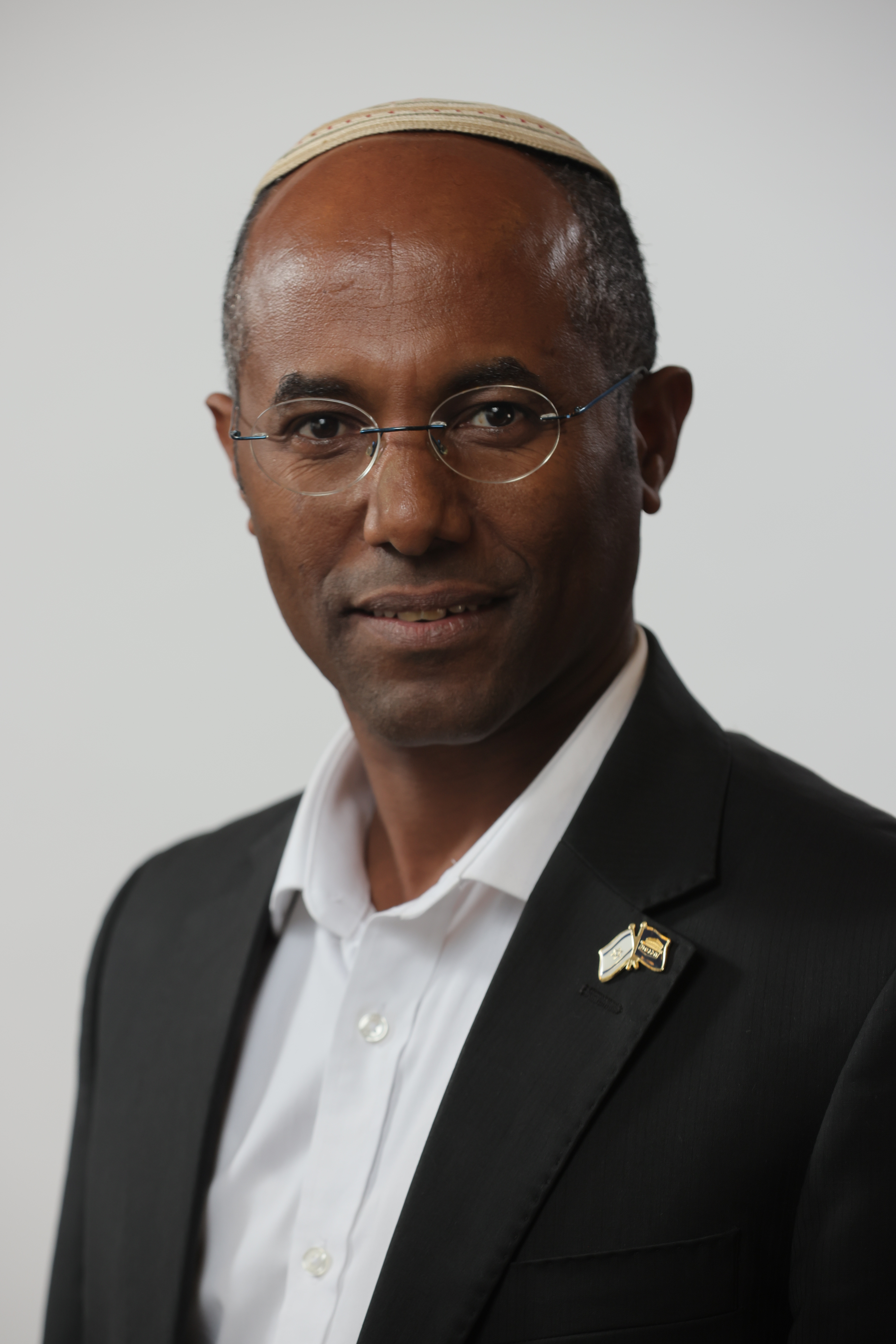
- Moshe Solomon, Member of Knesset

Faction represented in the Knesset
- 2022–2026: Religious Zionist Party

Personal details
- Born: 1 January 1975 (age 51) Shire, Tigray, Ethiopia
- Spouse: Rama
- Children: 6

Moshe Solomon (Hebrew: מֹשֶׁה סוֹלוֹמוֹן, born 1 January 1975) is an Israeli politician who served as a member of Knesset for the Religious Zionist Party following the 2022 Israeli legislative election. He announced in July 2026 that he would be leaving the party.

== Political career ==
Solomon was elected to the Knesset in 2022.

Religious Zionist Party leader Bezalel Smotrich announced in June 2026 that Solomon had been removed from the Knesset committees on which he served, after Solomon did not vote in favor of Basic Law: Torah Study in its preliminary reading.

Solomon announced in July 2026 that he would not run in the party primaries, stating that he felt the party had "moved off the path."
