= Atid Ehad =

Atid Ehad עתיד אחד
- Leader: Avraham Neguise; Yehezkel Stelzer; Ofir Sofer
- Founded: 2006
- Ideology: Ethiopian Jewish interests (2006)
- National affiliation: Likud (2021); Religious Zionist (2021–)
- Colours: Purple, blue, red
- Knesset: 1 / 120

Election symbol
- זה יך

Website
- atid1.org.il

Atid Ehad (Hebrew: עתיד אחד, lit. 'One Future') is a political party in Israel.

== History ==
Atid Ehad ran in the 2006 Knesset elections, and was headed by Avraham Neguise. It represented the concerns of Ethiopian Jews living in Israel, but also had other immigrant groups represented on its list such as Argentinian-born Yechezkel Stelzer, the party's number two, American-born Yosef Abramowitz, the party's number three candidate, and Aliyah advocate Yishai Fleisher. The party advocated for Ethiopian immigration to Israel and strengthening integration efforts for the community. In the 2006 elections, the party received 14,005 votes (0.45% of the total), not enough to cross the 2% threshold required to enter the Knesset. The party did not run in the 2009 elections. Neguise eventually rejoined Likud and served as a member of Knesset from 2015 to 2019.

Yechezkel Stelzer became leader of the party and ran in the 2013 elections, but withdrew from the elections less than a week before election day. It registered for the 2015 elections under the name "Protecting Our Children – Stop Feeding Them Porn". After polls showed it would receive fewer than 30,000 votes, the party dropped out and Stelzer endorsed the Jewish Home.

The party was revived in the build-up to the 2021 elections, when it was used as a "shelf party" (an inactive but still-registered party reactivated for use) for Ofir Sofer to enable him to run on the Likud list for the elections as part of an agreement between Likud leader Benjamin Netanyahu and Religious Zionist Party leader Bezalel Smotrich that would allow Sofer to split from Likud and join the Religious Zionist Party after the elections. On 14 June, after the swearing-in of the 36th government, Sofer moved to the Religious Zionist Party, increasing it from six to seven seats in the Knesset.
