= Simcha Rothman =

Israeli right-wing activist, lawyer and politician

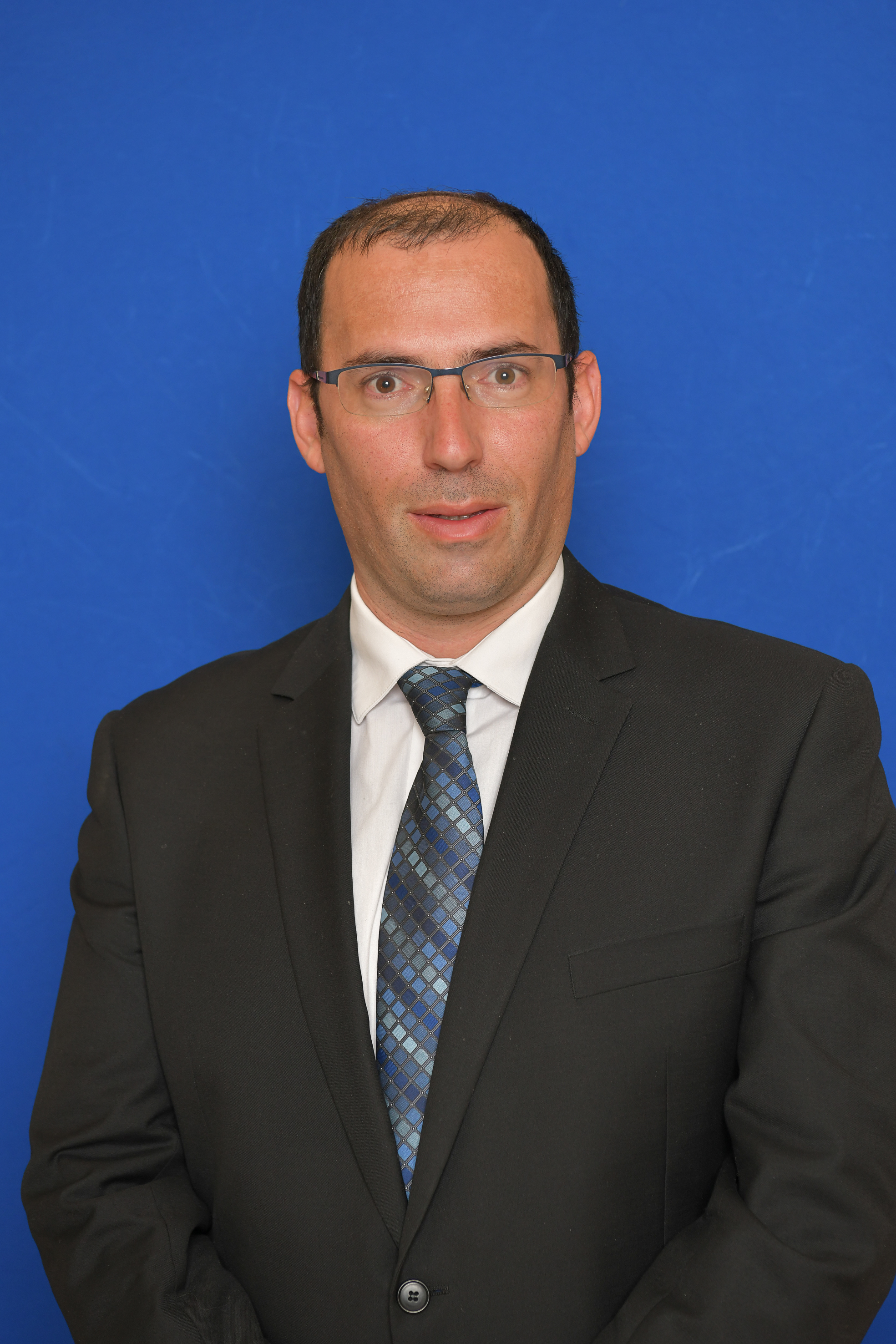
- Rothman in 2022

Faction represented in the Knesset
- 2021–: Religious Zionist Party

Personal details
- Born: 13 August 1980 (age 46) Bnei Brak, Israel

Simcha Dan Rothman (Hebrew: שִׂמְחָה דָּן רוֹטְמָן; born 13 August 1980) is an Israeli lawyer, right-wing activist, and politician. He is currently a member of the Knesset for the far-right Religious Zionist Party and the chair of the Knesset's Constitution, Law and Justice Committee.

== Biography ==
Rothman was born into a family that had moved into the region that is now Israel, from Cleveland, Ohio, in the United States by the early 20th century. For his mandatory military service he studied at Yeshivat Kerem B'Yavneh via the Hesder, but was later discharged from conscription for medical reasons. He volunteered for active service, and served for 13 months as a religious affairs NCO at the Military Engineering School. After earning an LLB at Bar-Ilan University he studied for a master's degree in public law at Tel Aviv University and Northwestern University.

He founded the Movement for Governability and Democracy in 2013. A critic of the corruption trial of Benjamin Netanyahu, he has campaigned for legislation to allow the government to override the Supreme Court and supports immunity from prosecution for serving prime ministers.

Prior to the 2021 Knesset elections Rothman was placed fourth on the list for the far-right Religious Zionist Party, and was elected to the Knesset as the party won six seats.

In 2023, following the formation of the thirty-seventh government of Israel, Rothman was appointed chairman of the Knesset's Constitution, Law and Justice Committee, where he led the efforts to overhaul Israel's judiciary that sparked the 2023 Israeli judicial reform protests.

Rothman is married, has five children, and lives in the mixed city of Lod.

== Controversy ==
On 2 June 2023 Rothman was filmed snatching a megaphone from a protester while on an official visit to New York City. The New York Police Department received a criminal harassment complaint filed against him by the protester, but closed it. Upon his return to Israel, he described the event as "a personal attack on me", while Labor party leader Merav Michaeli said "the move symbolized Rothman's efforts to silence democracy in Israel".

Following the October 7 attacks, Rothman spoke at Yale University, where a protest organized by Israelis outside the speech condemned Rothman's role in Israel's judicial reforms and called for Israel to prioritize the return of Israeli hostages. During his speech, Rothman said the only way to end the Gaza War was to "extinguish every last piece of hope that Palestinians have".

In May 2025, in response to a question from a Channel 4 interviewer asking whether children in Gaza were his enemies, Rothman responded, "They are our enemies." In the same interview, when asked about Israel's role in the Gaza Strip famine, Rothman denied that children in Gaza were dying of hunger.

In August 2025 Australia’s Minister for Home Affairs revoked the visa of Simcha Rothman for having expressed anti-Palestinian views, one day before he was scheduled to attend an event for the Jewish community in Australia. The incident came amidst diplomatic tensions between Australia and Israel, with Australia recently announcing its intention to recognize a Palestinian state at the United Nations. The leader of Rothman's Religious Zionism party, Bezalel Smotrich, and National Security Minister Itamar Ben-Gvir, have faced sanctions and travel bans from Australia and other nations for allegedly inciting violence against Palestinians in the West Bank.
