= Zvulun Kalfa =

Israeli politician

- זבולון כלפה
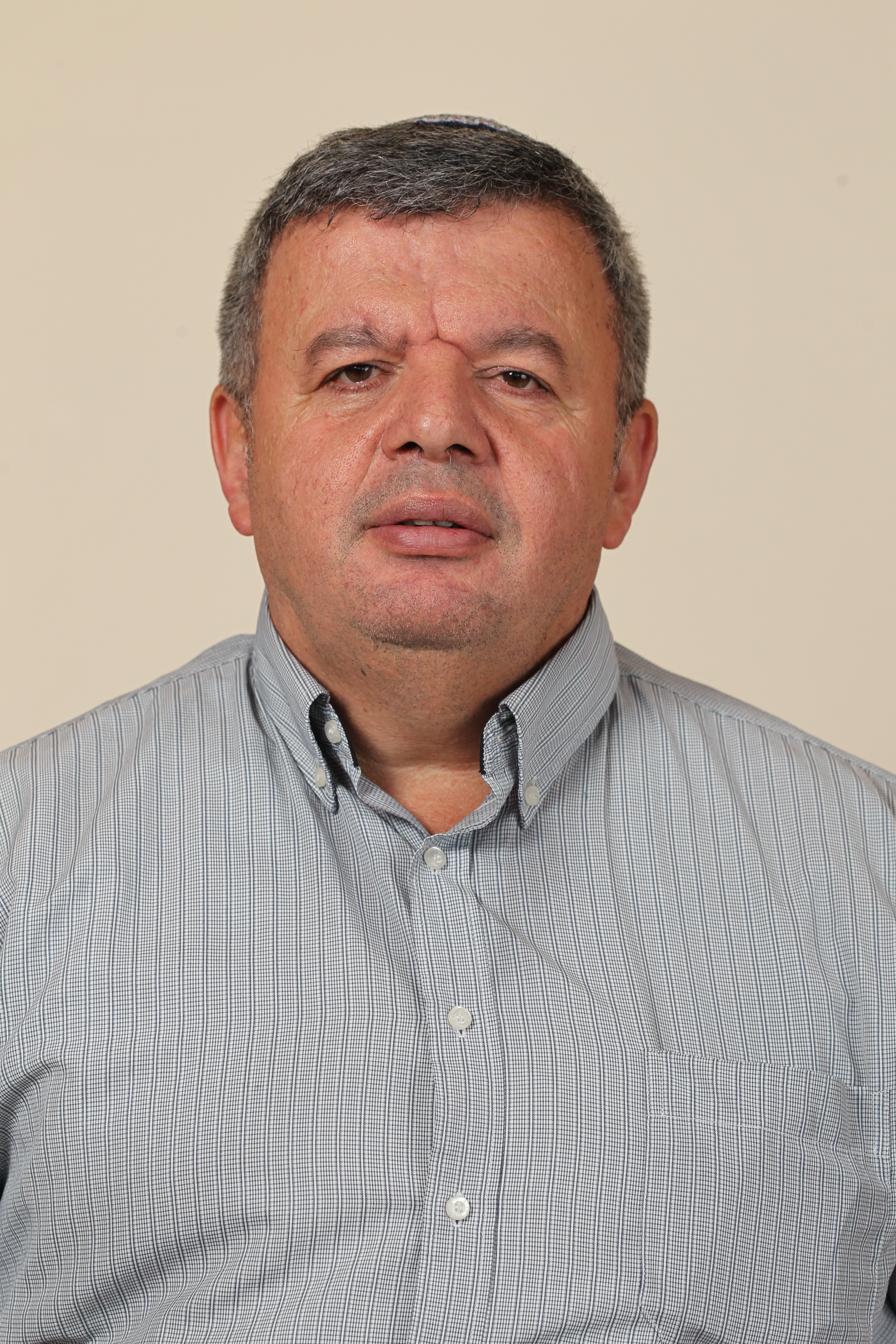

Faction represented in the Knesset
- 2013–2015: The Jewish Home

Personal details
- Born: 28 September 1962 (age 63) Sharsheret, Israel

Zvulun Kalfa (Hebrew: זבולון כלפה; born 28 September 1962) is an Israeli politician. He served as a member of the Knesset for the Jewish Home from 2013 until 2015.

== Biography ==
Born in the Sharsheret moshav, Kalfa was educated at yeshivas in Kfar Maimon and Yamit in the Sinai Peninsula. After Yamit was evacuated as part of the Egypt–Israel peace treaty, he helped establish a new yeshiva in Neve Dekalim in Gaza. After finishing his national service, he ran a boarding school in Kfar Maimon and a midrasha in Itamar. He also became a member of Hof Aza Regional Council.

Kalfa lived in the Bnei Atzmon settlement in the Gaza Strip. After it was evacuated in 2005, residents lived in tents near Netivot, and Kalfa became the community's leader, earning the nickname "Mayor of the City of Faith". He later helped the community move to the Shomria kibbutz, and was elected to Bnei Shimon Regional Council.

Prior to the 2013 Knesset elections, he won third place on the Tkuma list. After its alliance with the Jewish Home, he was placed seventh on the joint list, and was elected to the Knesset after the party won 12 seats.

He was placed 18th on the party's list for the 2015 elections, but later announced that he was leaving the party after it was revealed that former footballer and manager Eli Ohana would be on the party's list. He attempted to re-join the list after Ohana's withdrawal, but was refused the opportunity.

He is married, with 6 children.
