= Michal Waldiger =

Israeli lawyer and politician

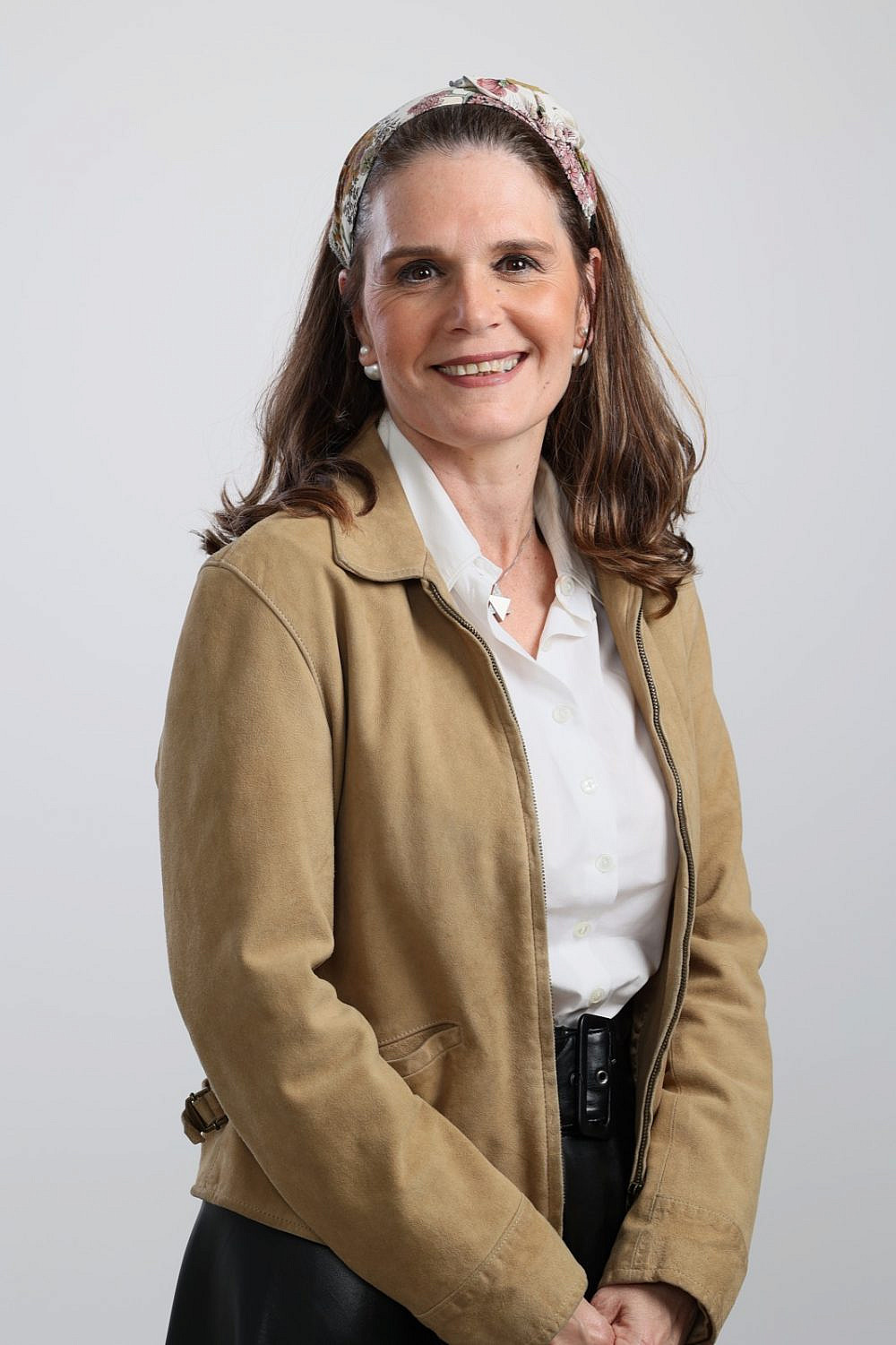
- Waldiger 2021

Faction represented in the Knesset
- 2021–2026: Religious Zionist Party

Personal details
- Born: 6 January 1969 (age 57) Bnei Brak, Israel

Michal Miriam Waldiger (Hebrew: מִיכַל מִרְיָם ווֹלְדִיגֵר; born 6 January 1969) is an Israeli lawyer and politician. She has served as a member of the Knesset for the Religious Zionist Party from 2021 to 2026.

== Biography ==
Waldiger was born in Bnei Brak to a prominent family in the religious Zionist community. She is the great-granddaughter of rabbi Naftoli Trop. She attended a Bnei Akiva Ulpana in Tel Aviv, and earned a law degree from Bar-Ilan University. She later became head of a law firm. She served as director of Bat Ami, an organization for religious Zionist girls carrying out national service.

Entering politics, she was elected to the council of Givat Shmuel in the 2013 local elections as a representative of the Jewish Home. She ran for the local party leadership in the build-up to the 2018 local elections, but stood down from the party's list after being defeated. Prior to the 2021 Knesset elections, she was placed second on the Religious Zionist Party list, and was elected to the Knesset as the party won six seats. She was re-elected in the 2022 Knesset elections, and subsequently appointed Deputy Minister of Finance. She resigned from the finance ministry in October 2023.

She was appointed the head of the Knesset's Labor and Welfare Committee in August 2025. Much of her efforts are focused on improving services to diverse traumatized populations.

Waldiger is married, and a mother of five. She lives with her family in Giv'at Shmuel.

== Views ==
On May 9, 2025, during an exchange in the Knesset with Ahmad Tibi, Waldiger stated that: “What is being done in Gaza, it’s a pity that worse isn’t done. There are no innocents. Yes, children should be killed. Because they serve as a human shield.” Her comments were cited on the United Nations Human Rights Council report that alleges Israel deliberately targeted Palestenian children in Gaza and West Bank, actions it concluded may constitute a genocide.
