= Avraham Neguise =

Israeli politician

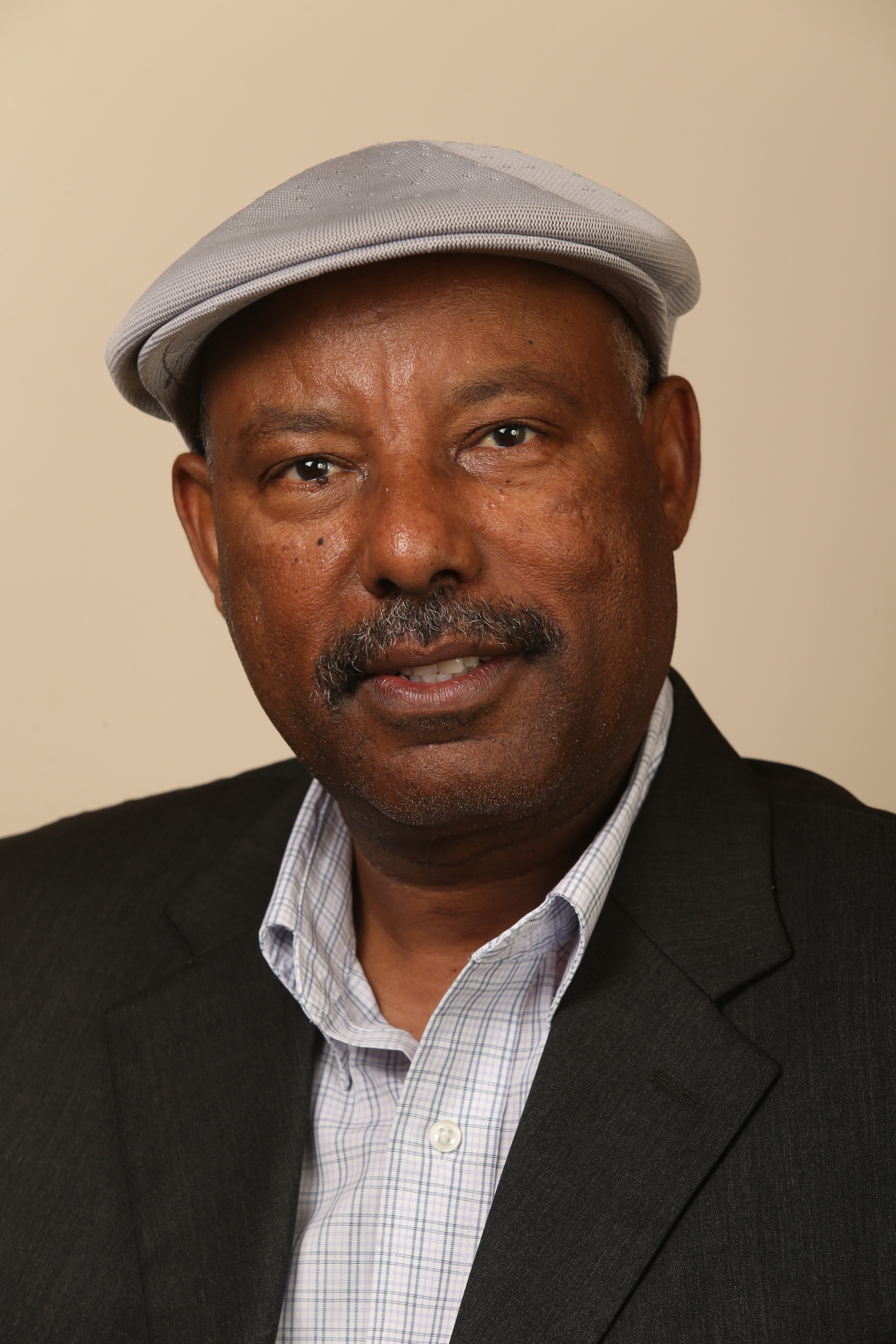
- Neguise in 2015

Faction represented in the Knesset
- 2015–2019: Likud

Personal details
- Born: 10 February 1958 (age 68) Gondar, Ethiopia

Avraham Neguise (Hebrew: אַבְרָהָם נֶגוּסֵה; born 10 February 1958) is an Israeli politician and activist for the Falash Mura community. He served as a member of the Knesset for the Likud party from 2015 to 2019.

== Early life and education ==
Neguise was born in the city of Gondar in northern Ethiopia, where he worked as a shepherd. He emigrated to Israel in 1985. He earned a BA and MA in social work at the Hebrew University of Jerusalem, an LLB from Sha'arei Mishpat College, an MA in initiatives and renewal from the Swinburne University of Technology and a PhD in education from the University of Sussex.

== Political and social activism ==
Neguise founded and served as director-general of South Wing to Zion, an organisation representing Ethiopian immigrants, and is known for his role in leading the struggle to bring the rest of Ethiopian Jewry to Israel.

In 2007 Neguise protested the end of Israel's programs in Ethiopia to support aliyah. He said that the remaining community of Ethiopian Jews had established a synagogue, that the reports he received on the community were distressing, and that the Falash Mura remaining in Addis Ababa should be allowed to immigrate to Israel as well.

He established the Atid Ehad (One Future) party, which contested the 2006 Knesset elections, but received only 0.4% of the vote and failed to win a seat. He subsequently joined the Jewish Home, and was placed eighth on its list for the 2009 elections. However, the party won only three seats and he did not become a Knesset member.

== Political career ==
Prior to the 2013 elections he joined Likud, and was placed 48th on the joint Likud Yisrael Beiteinu list, again failing to win a seat when the alliance won only 31 seats. Prior to the 2015 Knesset elections he was placed 27th on the Likud list. He was elected to the Knesset as Likud won 30 seats. Neguise became the only Israeli of Ethiopian origin to be elected to the 20th Knesset.

As a Member of the Knesset he focused on social issues such as helping new immigrants integrate into Israeli society, providing support and education for youth in underprivileged neighborhoods. "I want to make sure that laws passed in the Knesset are actually implemented, like the one requiring Ethiopian immigrants to be hired in government offices and government-owned companies," he said. Neguise expressed confidence that the diversity of the incoming Knesset was a positive development: "We have representatives of women, new immigrants and Arabs, and I think we can all work together in the Knesset." He has appealed to the Knesset not to wait until a coalition is formed to bring all Ethiopians Jews to Israel.

In April 2015 Neguise came to the defense of an Ethiopian-born soldier serving in the Israel Defense Forces who was beaten by a policeman in what was viewed as a racist attack which was caught on video. The soldier, Damas Pakedeh, was arrested on charges of attacking a police officer and then released. Pakada, an orphan who arrived with his siblings in 2008, claims the incident was racially motivated and that if the video had not been taken, he would have been punished. Instead, the police officer and volunteer were suspended pending an investigation. Neguise called on National Police Chief Yohanan Danino to prosecute the police officer and volunteer, saying they engaged in "a gross violation of the basic law of respecting others and their liberty by those who are supposed to protect us."

In a 2016 interview with an American Jewish student newspaper, Neguise explained the value of Israel's Absorption Ministry: "It is responsible for absorbing new immigrants and helping them integrate into society. Be it is housing, employment, education, health and welfare. The government is ready to absorb millions of immigrants. I will tell you my story. I grew up as a shepherd in Ethiopia, I immigrated to Israel 31 years ago. I got an equal opportunity for education in Israel. While in Ethiopia I graduated from high school, here in Israel, I have five degrees, and I'm a legislator in Israel. I am one of the millions who settled here successfully."

In April 2025 Neguise was expelled from the African Union Conference Center and Office Complex, the headquarters for the African Union after other member states refused to attend for an annual meeting.

== Personal life ==
Neguise is married with two children, and lives in the Pisgat Ze'ev settlement in East Jerusalem.
