= Hanan Porat =

Israeli rabbi and educator

- חנן פורת
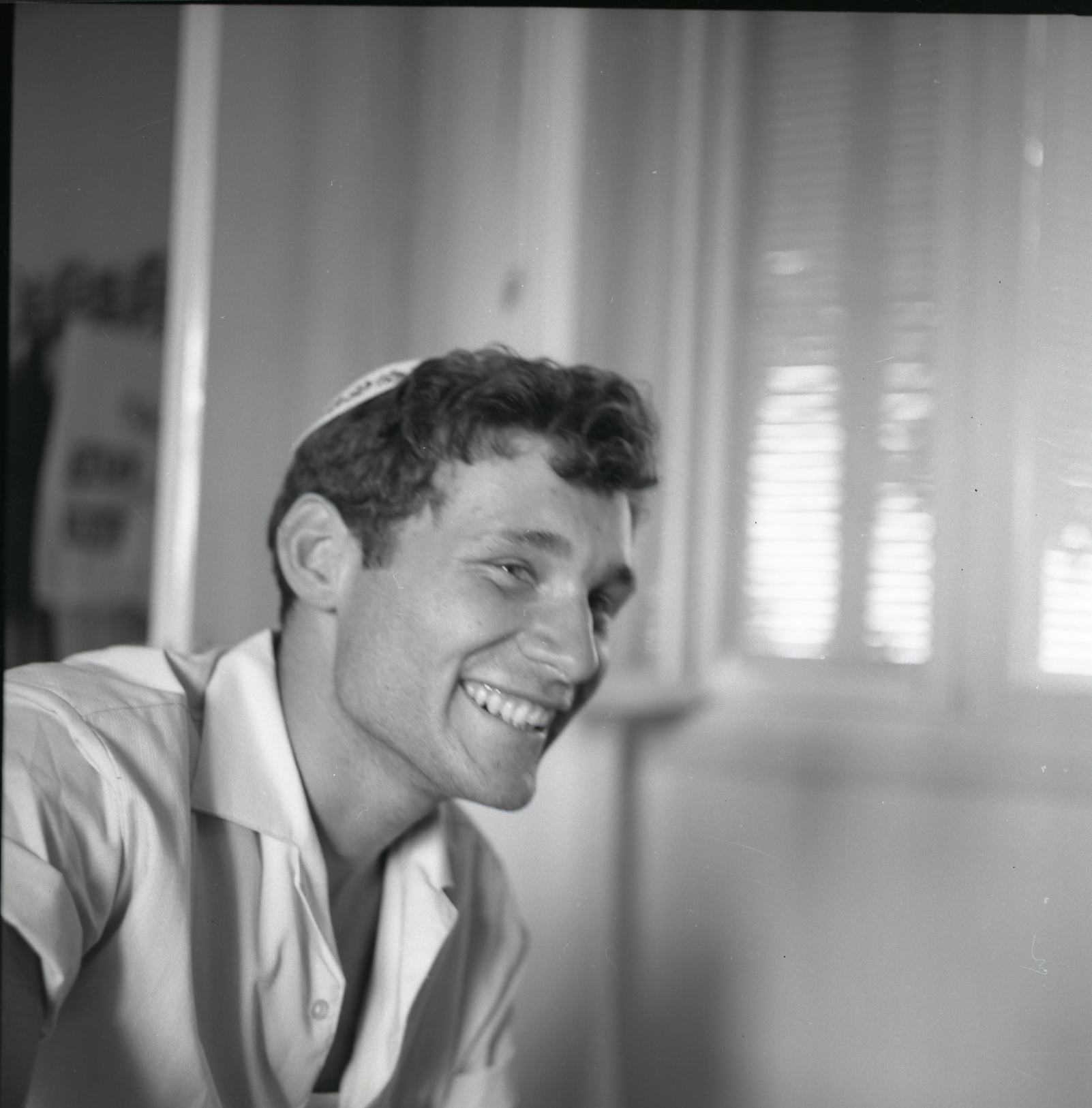
- Porat in 1968

Faction represented in the Knesset
- 1981–1984: Tehiya
- 1988–1999: National Religious Party
- 1999: Tkuma
- 1999: National Union

Personal details
- Born: 5 December 1943 Kfar Pines, Mandatory Palestine
- Died: 4 October 2011 (aged 67) Kfar Etzion, West Bank
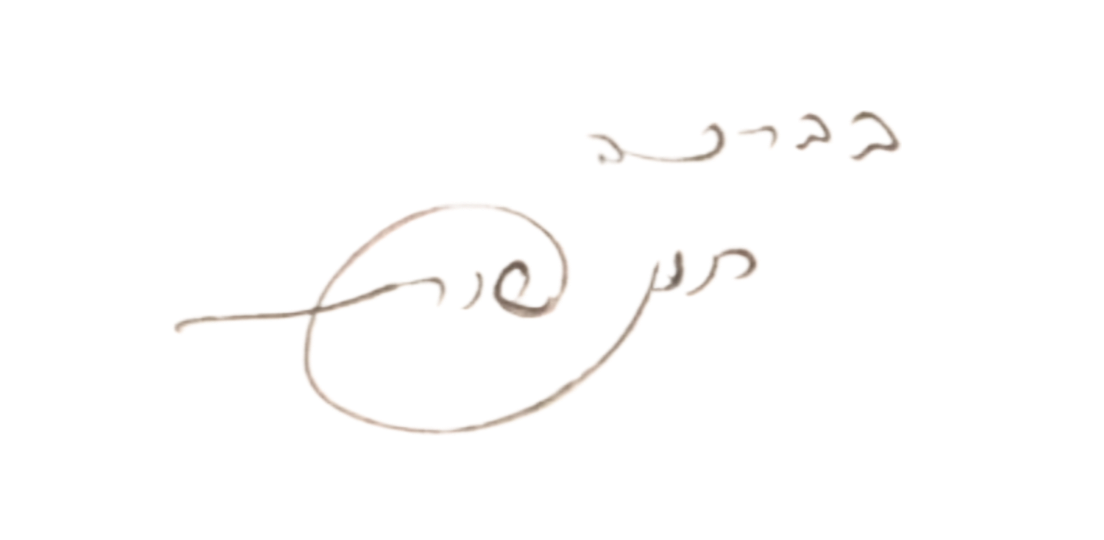
- Signature

Hanan Porat (Hebrew: חנן פורת; 5 December 1943 – 4 October 2011) was an Israeli Orthodox rabbi, educator and politician who served as a member of the Knesset for Tehiya, the National Religious Party, Tkuma and the National Union from 1981 to 1984 and then from 1988 to 1999.

== Biography ==
Born Hanan Spitzer in Kfar Pines during the Mandate era, Porat's family moved to Kfar Etzion in 1944. In early 1948, during the Arab riots of 1948, Kfar Etzion was besieged and the children were evacuated to Jerusalem. Porat's father also moved there to arrange convoys. After the Kfar Etzion massacre his family settled in Kfar Pines. Porat studied at the Bnei Akiva yeshiva high school, Yeshivat Kerem B'Yavneh and the Mercaz HaRav talmudic college and was ordained as a rabbi. He worked as a religious teacher at several yeshivas.

He is one of the main characters featured in Yossi Klein Halevi's Like Dreamers: The Story of the Israeli Paratroopers who Reunited Jerusalem and Divided A Nation. He served in Israel's 55th Paratroopers Brigade during the Six-Day War and was among the troops that captured the Temple Mount and conquered East Jerusalem. During this euphoric moment in Israel's history he is quoted as saying "We are writing the next chapter of the Bible." He later said that the Israeli victory should have become a national holiday. After the Six-Day War, he helped re-establish the Gush Etzion settlement bloc in the West Bank. He convinced Prime Minister Levi Eshkol to grant permission to settle in Gush Etzion. He first re-established the community of Kfar Etzion. Then, together with Rav Yoel Bin-Nun, he founded Yeshivat Har Etzion and the community of Alon Shevut. They recruited Rav Yehuda Amital to head the new yeshiva and a couple years later, Rav Aharon Lichtenstein would come on aliyah to co-head the yeshiva alongside Amital.

Porat was badly wounded in the Yom Kippur War of 1973 on the bank of the Suez Canal. He recovered and was amongst the founders of the Gush Emunim movement, which founded over 100 Israeli settlements. In 1975 he led the founding of Elon Moreh, the first Israeli settlement in the West Bank, in Sebastia.

Porat died of cancer on 4 October 2011 aged 67. He was survived by his wife, ten children and 20 grandchildren.

== Political career ==
In the 1981 elections he was elected to the Knesset on the Tehiya list. He resigned on 7 March 1984, towards the end of the Knesset term, and was replaced by Zvi Shiloah. After the evacuation of Yamit in 1982 he announced his intention to build new settlements in parts of the Land of Israel still not in Israeli hands. In 1995 he convinced Prime Minister Yitzhak Rabin not to hand over Rachel's Tomb to the Palestinian Authority. He tried to repeat that in 2008. Prior to Israel's disengagement from Gaza, he instructed youngsters in Neve Dekalim in Gush Katif to disrupt evacuation forces.

In 1988 he returned to the Knesset, this time as a member of the National Religious Party. He was re-elected in 1992 and 1996. In 1996 he was appointed the NRP's parliamentary group chairman, but on 4 March 1999 he and Zvi Hendel left the party to establish a new faction, initially named Emunim, later renamed Tkuma.

Prior to the 1999 elections Tkuma formed an alliance with other small right-wing parties named the National Union. Porat was placed third on the Union's list, and was re-elected again. However, he resigned from the Knesset on 20 October that year and was replaced by Hendel.

== Published works ==
- Et Ahai Anohi Mevakesh (first published as Et Anat Anohi Mevakesh)
- Me'at Min Ha'or
- Recorded lectures on Arutz Meir (MeirTV) by Machon Meir

== See also ==
- Beit Orot

Party political offices
Preceded by Position established	Leader of Tkuma; 1998–1999	Succeeded by Zvi Hendel
