= Religious Zionist Party =

Israeli political party

Religious Zionist Party הציונות הדתית الصهيونية الدينية
- Chairman: Bezalel Smotrich
- Secretary-General: Yehuda Vald
- Founders: Hanan Porat; Zvi Hendel
- Founded: 1998
- Split from: National Religious Party
- Headquarters: Beit HaShenhav Building, Jerusalem
- Ideology: Religious Zionism; Religious conservatism; Social conservatism; Ultranationalism; Anti-Arab racism
- Political position: Far-right
- National affiliation: National Union (1999–2013); The Jewish Home (2013–2019); URWP (2019); Yamina (2019, 2020–2021)
- Member parties: Otzma Yehudit (formerly); Noam (formerly); Zehut
- Knesset: 5 / 120

Election symbol
- ט ط

Website
- zionutdatit.org.il

The Religious Zionist Party (Hebrew: הציונות הדתית, romanized: HaTzionut HaDatit, lit. 'The Religious Zionism'), known as Tkuma (Hebrew: תקומה, lit. 'Revival') until 2021 and officially known as National Union–Tkuma (Hebrew: האיחוד הלאומי-תקומה, HaIchud HaLeumi–Tkuma), is a far-right, ultra-nationalist, and religious Zionist political party in Israel. In all the elections since its founding in 1998, the party has joined other factions and competed as part of a united list.

== History ==
Tkuma was established in 1998 by Hanan Porat and Zvi Hendel, who left the National Religious Party in reaction to the Wye River Memorandum. Almost immediately after the creation of Tkuma, it joined together with Moledet and Herut – The National Movement, to form the National Union, a right-wing coalition which won four seats in the 1999 elections, with one of those seats going to Tkuma. These elections were a failure for the right-wing bloc, and were won by Ehud Barak, leaving the National Union and Tkuma in the opposition. In February 2000, Yisrael Beiteinu joined the National Union, alongside Tkuma, and the two parties joined Ariel Sharon's first government in 2001. One year later, Tkuma and the rest of the National Union left Sharon's government over disagreements over the handling of the Second Intifada. For the 2003 elections, the National Union kept its alliance with Yisrael Beiteinu, with its increased support helping to win seven seats for the entire list, and two for Tkuma. The party was included in Ariel Sharon's coalition, alongside Likud, Shinui, the National Religious Party, and Yisrael BaAliyah.

Because of tensions over the withdrawal from the Gaza Strip (Tkuma was ideologically opposed, and Hendel lived in the Gaza settlement of Ganei Tal), National Union ministers Binyamin Elon and Avigdor Lieberman were sacked, and the party left the coalition. However, the National Union was bolstered by the addition of Ahi, which had split off from the National Religious Party when they decided to remain in the coalition.

Before the 2006 elections, the alliance between the National Union and Yisrael Beiteinu was dissolved, and a new alliance between the National Union and the National Religious Party was formed, which won nine seats, two of which were allocated to Tkuma and taken by Hendel and Uri Ariel.

On 3 November 2008, ahead of the 2009 elections, Tkuma faced a crisis. The party itself announced that it would unite with Ahi, the National Religious Party, and Moledet, to form a new right-wing party, which was later named the Jewish Home. However, around half of the former Tkuma members later left the new party to re-establish Tkuma and rejoin the National Union alongside Moledet, Hatikva, and Eretz Yisrael Shelanu. In the elections themselves, the National Union received four seats, with Tkuma getting two seats.

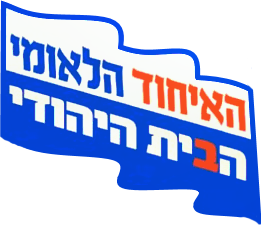
Initial logo of the united list of The Jewish Home and the National Union

Ahead of the 2013 elections, the National Union split, with all member parties except for Tkuma splitting off to form Otzma LeYisrael, leaving Tkuma as the only party left in the National Union. Tkuma proceeded to change its name to "National Union–Tkuma", appropriating the National Union name. The party opted to run as part of the Jewish Home list for the 2013 elections. The Jewish Home won 12 seats, four of which (Ariel, Ben-Dahan, Kalfa, and Strook) were members of Tkuma. The party decided to continue its alliance with the Jewish Home for the 2015 Knesset elections, taking the 2nd, 8th, 13th, and 17th spots on the joint list. The Jewish Home dropped to eight seats in that election.

Old logo utilized by the party as "National Union" until 2021

In 2019 Bezalel Smotrich took over party leadership, winning party elections in a landslide against Ariel. Ahead of the April 2019 elections, the party joined with the Jewish Home and Otzma Yehudit to create the Union of Right-Wing Parties, which won five seats in the elections, two of which went to National Union–Tkuma.

Ahead of the September 2019 elections, Tkuma and the Jewish Home agreed to form an alliance with the New Right, called Yamina, with Tkuma leader Smotrich receiving the third spot on the joint list. Yamina officially split on 10 October 2019 into two Knesset factions – the New Right, and the Jewish Home–National Union. For the 2020 elections, Otzma Yehudit and The Jewish Home agreed on 20 December to run together, in an alliance later named the United Jewish Home. Smotrich was critical of the move, stating that it was unlikely that the alliance would pass the electoral threshold. Tkuma, The Jewish Home, and the New Right reformed Yamina on 15 January 2020. On 22 April 2020 it was reported that Yamina leader Naftali Bennett was now "considering all options" for Yamina's political future, including departing from Netanyahu's government, which had just agreed to a coalition government with the leader of the opposition Blue and White party, Benny Gantz, and joining the opposition. Bennett was said to be unhappy with the new coalition government's decision to hold back on the issue of judicial reform. On 14 May 2020 The Jewish Home's only Knesset member, Rafi Peretz, ended his status as a member of Yamina, and agreed to join Netanyahu's new government as well. On 15 May, Tkuma, along with the New Right, split with Netanyahu and made the Yamina alliance a member of the opposition. On 17 May 2020 Bennett met with Gantz, who also succeeded him as defence minister, and declared that the Yamina party would be a member of the opposition, with its "head held high". Tkuma was renamed to the Religious Zionist Party on 7 January 2021, while it ended its membership in Yamina on 20 January.

Logo used in the 2021 Knesset elections as part of the rebranding of National Union party

In February 2021 the party agreed to run a shared list for the 2021 Knesset elections with Noam and Otzma Yehudit. The list ran under the Religious Zionist Party name and won six seats, four of which were filled by Religious Zionist Party members. On 14 June, after the swearing-in of the 36th government, MK Ofir Sofer split from the Likud faction and merged into the Religious Zionist Party, increasing the number of seats held by the party to seven. He had run during the election as part of the Likud list for Knesset, as a member of Atid Ehad party, using it as a shelf party (a dormant, but still-registered, party brought back into use).

Logo used from 2022 to 2026

The Religious Zionist Party, Noam and Otzma Yehudit submitted a single list on 14 September 2022 ahead of the 2022 Knesset elections, which saw the alliance win 14 seats. The parties split into three parties in the Knesset on 20 November 2022. In 2023, The Jewish Home agreed to merge into the party ahead of the 2023 Israeli municipal elections. The party, running under the name Mafdal-Religious Zionism, won two seats in the election. The party has polled below the electoral threshold as of mid-April 2026, while Otzma Yehudit has consistently scored around 10 seats, ahead of the 2026 Israeli legislative election. The following month, a Maariv poll marked the first time since December 2025 that it had passed the threshold in that organization's polling. Smotrich stated in an August interview with The Jerusalem Post that his party would likely run on its own in the October election. The party signed a deal on 1 September to run with Zehut as part of a technical bloc. The party won five seats in the election.

== Ideology ==
The Religious Zionist Party is opposed to any territorial concessions to Palestinian or Syrian claims for land. Some members support the annexation of the entire West Bank, though the official policy of the Jewish Home parliamentary faction, of which the party was aligned between 2013 and 2019, only supports annexation of Area C of the West Bank, which makes up the 63% of land in the West Bank allocated to Israel in the Oslo Accords.

The party is opposed to recognition of same-sex marriage on a religious basis. The party advocates for increased funding for Torah study and religious education.

Foreign Policy journalist David Rosenberg has stated that the Religious Zionist Party's "platform includes things like annexation of West Bank settlements, the expulsion of asylum-seekers, and political control of the judicial system". He further described the Religious Zionist Party as a political party "driven by Jewish supremacy and anti-Arab racism". The party has been assessed by The Middle East Journal as "militantly anti-Arab" and far-right.

== Leaders ==
Leader		Took office	Left office
1	Hanan Porat	1998	1999
2	Zvi Hendel	1999	2009
3	Ya'akov Katz	2009	2012
4	Uri Ariel	2012	2019
5	Bezalel Smotrich	2019	Incumbent

== Election results ==
=== Knesset ===
Election	Leader	Votes	%	Seats	+/–	Status
1999	Hanan Porat	Part of National Union (Note: 1999, received 100,181 or 3.03%) (Note: 2003, received 173,973 or 5.53%)		1 / 120	–	Opposition (1999–2001)
1999	Hanan Porat	Part of National Union		1 / 120	–	Coalition (2001–2003)
2003	Zvi Hendel	Part of National Union		2 / 120	▲1	Coalition (2003–2004)
2003	Zvi Hendel	Part of National Union		2 / 120	▲1	Opposition (2004–2006)
2006	Zvi Hendel	Part of NU–NRP (Note: received 224,083 or 7.14%)		2 / 120	Steady	Opposition
2009	Ya'akov Katz	part of National Union (Note: received 112,570 or 3.34%)		2 / 120	Steady	Opposition
2013	Uri Ariel	part of The Jewish Home (Note: 2013, received 345,985 or 9.12%) (Note: 2015, received 283,910 or 6.74%)		4 / 120	▲2	Coalition
2015	Uri Ariel	part of The Jewish Home		2 / 120	▼2	Coalition
Apr 2019	Bezalel Smotrich	part of URWP (Note: received 159,468 or 3.70%)		2 / 120	Steady	Snap election
Sep 2019	Bezalel Smotrich	Part of Yamina (Note: 2019, received 260,655 or 5.87%) (Note: received 240,689 or 5.24%)		2 / 120	Steady	Snap election
2020	Bezalel Smotrich	Part of Yamina		2 / 120	Steady	Opposition
2021 (Note: Otzma Yehudit and Noam ran on the Religious Zionist Party list; the entire list won six seats, with Otzma Yehudit and Noam winning one each)	Bezalel Smotrich	with Otzma Yehudit and Noam (Note: 2021, received 225,641 or 5.12%) (Note: 2022, received 516,470 or 10.84%)		4 / 120	▲2	Opposition
2022 (Note: Otzma Yehudit and Noam ran on the Religious Zionist Party list; the entire list won fourteen seats, with Otzma Yehudit winning six and Noam winning one)	Bezalel Smotrich	with Otzma Yehudit and Noam		7 / 120	▲3	Coalition
2026	Bezalel Smotrich	with Zehut (Note: received 290,451 or 5.10%)		5 / 120	▼2	TBA

== Knesset members list ==
Knesset term	Year	Seats	Members
15th	1999–2003	1	Hanan Porat (Note: replaced by Zvi Hendel after resigning from Knesset on 20 October 1999)
16th	2003–2006	2	Zvi Hendel, Uri Ariel
17th	2006–2009	2	Zvi Hendel, Uri Ariel
18th	2009–2013	2	Ya'akov Katz, Uri Ariel
18th	2013–2015	4	Uri Ariel, Eli Ben-Dahan, Zvulun Kalfa, Orit Strook (Note: Hillel Horowitz entered Knesset on 16 February 2015 to replace Uri Orbach)
20th	2015–2019	2	Uri Ariel, Bezalel Smotrich
21st	2019	2	Bezalel Smotrich, Ofir Sofer
22nd	2019–2020	2	Bezalel Smotrich, Ofir Sofer
23rd	2020–2021	2	Bezalel Smotrich, Ofir Sofer
24th	2021–2022	5	Bezalel Smotrich, Michal Waldiger, Simcha Rothman, Orit Strook, Ofir Sofer (Note: Joined during the Knesset term.)
25th	2022–2026	7	Bezalel Smotrich (Note: Replaced by Zvi Sukkot on 5 February 2023 to become minister), Ofir Sofer, Orit Strook, Simcha Rothman, Michal Waldiger, Ohad Tal, Moshe Solomon
26th	2026–present	5	Bezalel Smotrich, Orit Strook, Simcha Rothman, Tzvika Mor, Itamar Eitam

== See also ==
- Orthodox Judaism
- Religious Zionism
- Gush Emunim
