= Ofir Sofer =

Israeli politician (born 1975)

- אופיר סופר
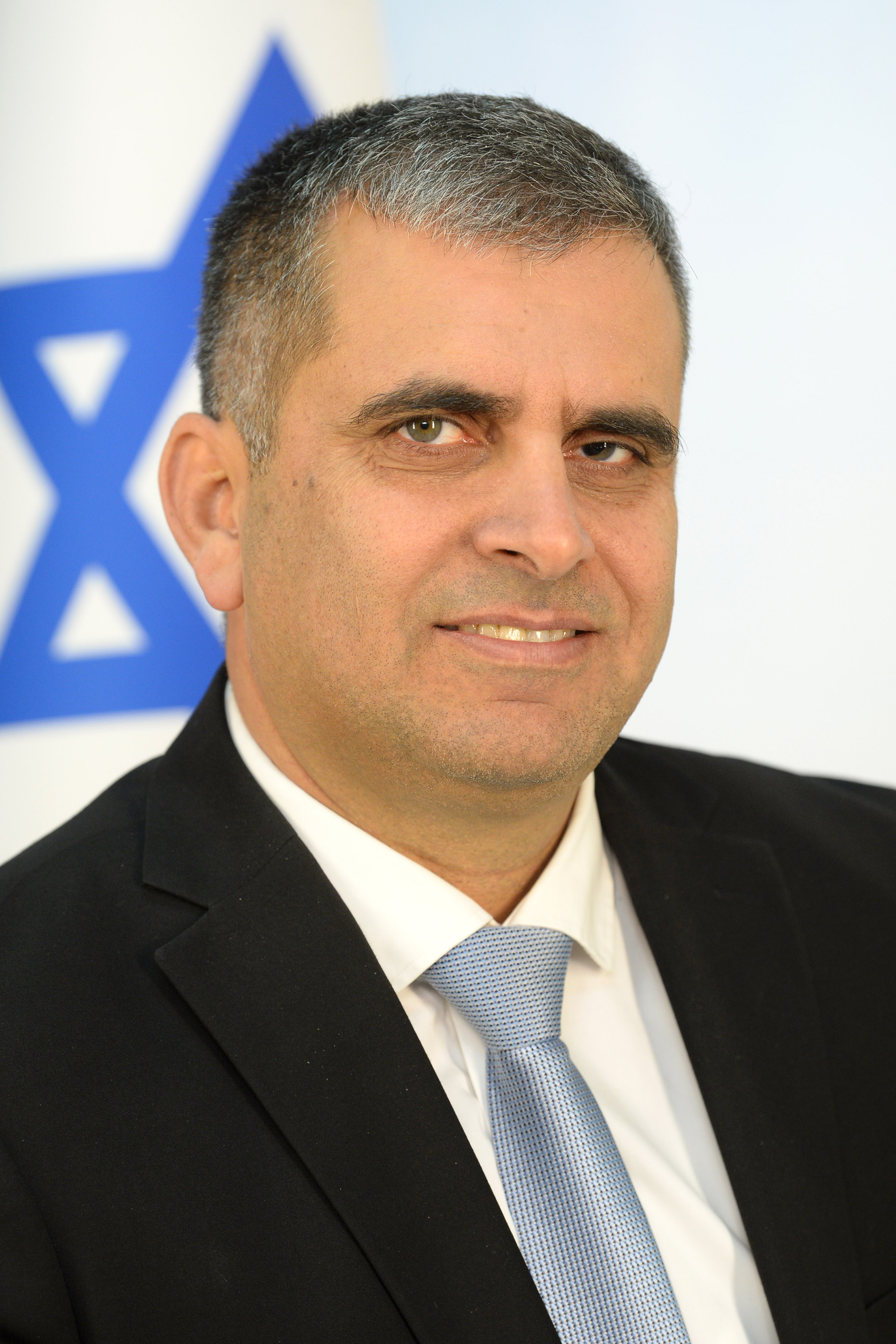
- Official portrait, 2023

Ministerial roles
- 2022–: Minister of Aliyah and Integration

Faction represented in the Knesset
- 2019: Union of Right-Wing Parties
- 2019: Yamina
- 2019–2020: Jewish Home–Tkuma
- 2020–2021: Yamina
- 2021: Likud
- 2021–2026: Religious Zionist Party

Personal details
- Born: 1 August 1975 (age 51) Alma, Israel
- Party: Religious Zionist Party
- Spouse: Adina Sofer
- Children: 7
- Education: University of Haifa

Ofir Sofer (Hebrew: אופיר סופר; born 1 August 1975) is an Israeli politician. He is currently the Minister of Aliyah and Integration, and served as a member of the Knesset for the Religious Zionist Party from 2019 to 2026. Sofer announced in July 2026 that he would not run in the 2026 Israeli legislative election.

Sofer is a former IDF major and is considered a disabled veteran. Afterwards he worked at the Ministry for the Development of the Periphery, the Negev and the Galilee.

== Political career ==
In 2014, he became secretary general of the Orthodox-nationalist Tkuma party. When the party joined the Union of Right-Wing Parties alliance for the April 2019 Knesset elections, Sofer was placed fourth on the alliances' list, and entered the Knesset when it won five seats. During the 2021 election he ran in Likud list for the Knesset, as a member of Atid Ehad party, using it as a shelf party. On 14 June he split from Likud and merged with the Religious Zionist Party, after the swearing-in of the 36th government. The split was not officially approved until 27 June.

Ahead of the 2022 election, Sofer was given the third spot on a joint list between the Religious Zionist Party and Otzma Yehudit, and was re-elected to the Knesset as a result. On 29 December 2022, Sofer was appointed Minister of Aliyah and Integration in the new government.

Sofer announced on 15 July 2026 that he was not running for re-election and would retire from politics, a day after many in his party voted for a bill that ended arrests for Haredim who evaded the draft.

== Personal life ==
Sofer is married, has 7 children, and lives in Tefahot, a religious moshav in Northern Israel. He is of Tunisian-Jewish descent and his grandfather made his aliyah from Libya.
