= Bezalel Smotrich =

Israeli far-right politician (born 1980)

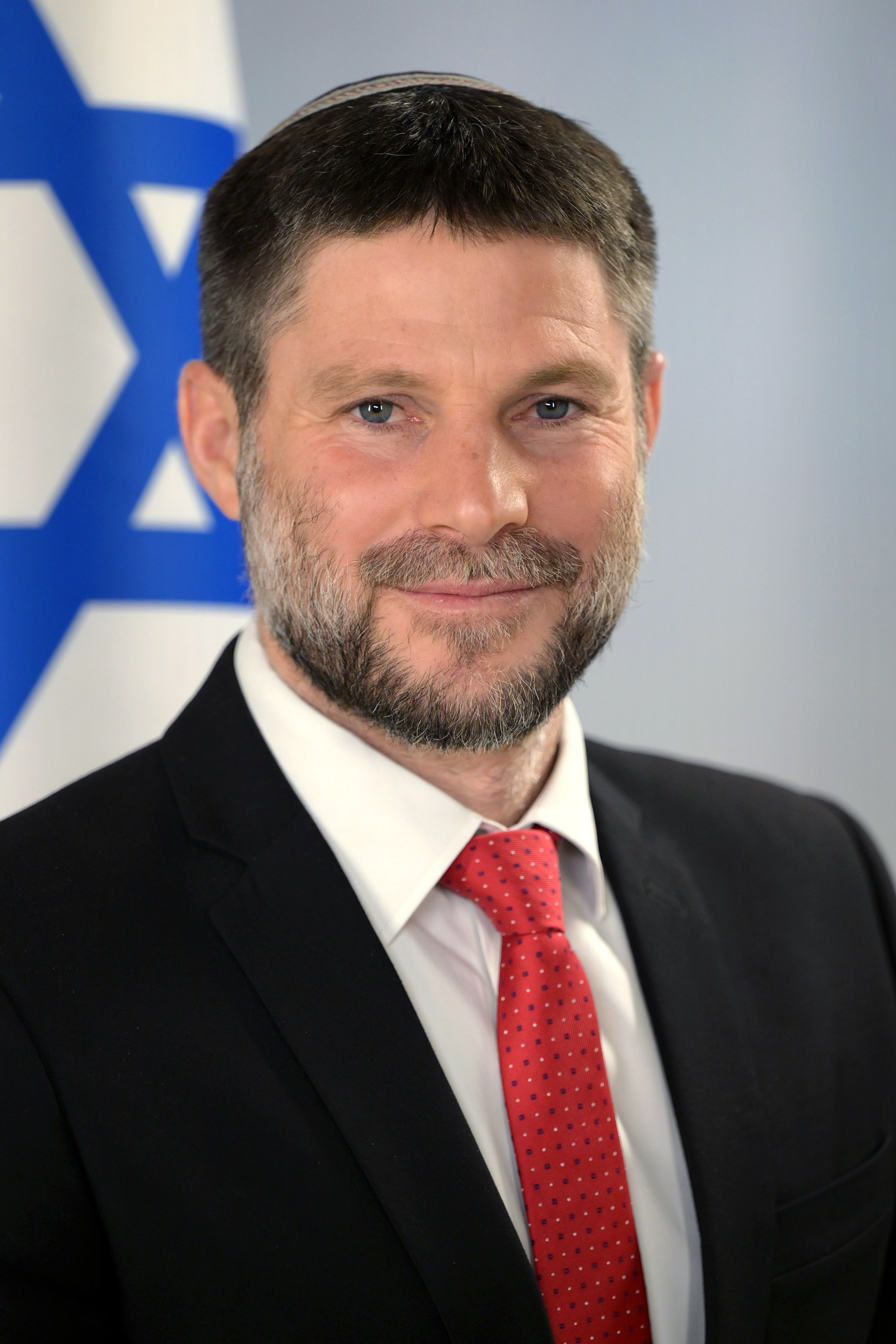
- Smotrich in 2023

Ministerial roles
- 2019–2020: Minister of Transport
- 2022–: Minister of Finance
- 2022–: Minister in the Defense Ministry

Faction represented in the Knesset
- 2015–2019: The Jewish Home
- 2019: Union of Right-Wing Parties
- 2019: Yamina
- 2019–2020: The Jewish Home–Tkuma
- 2020–2021: Yamina
- 2021–2023: Religious Zionist Party
- 2026–: Religious Zionist Party

Personal details
- Born: 27 February 1980 (age 46) Haspin, Golan Heights

Bezalel Yoel Smotrich (Note: Hebrew: בְּצַלְאֵל יוֹאֵל סְמוֹטְרִיץ׳) (born 27 February 1980) is an Israeli politician and lawyer who has served as the Minister of Finance since 2022. The leader of the Religious Zionist Party, he previously served as a Knesset member for the Jewish Home and Yamina, leaving in 2023 after resigning under the Norwegian Law, allowing him to remain a minister in the government while his seat in the Knesset could be taken by another candidate from his party.

Smotrich is a settler in the Israeli-occupied West Bank, living in the settlement of Kedumim, which is illegal under international law. His residence was also built illegally outside the settlement proper.

Smotrich's statements have led to several controversies. As part of the Israeli far-right, he is a supporter of expanding Israeli settlements in the West Bank, opposes Palestinian statehood, denies the existence of a Palestinian people, and is a self-described "homophobe". As minister with powers in the occupied Palestinian territories, he has led clandestine Israeli efforts to annex territories in the West Bank, first as a fait accompli, then by force of law.

== Biography ==
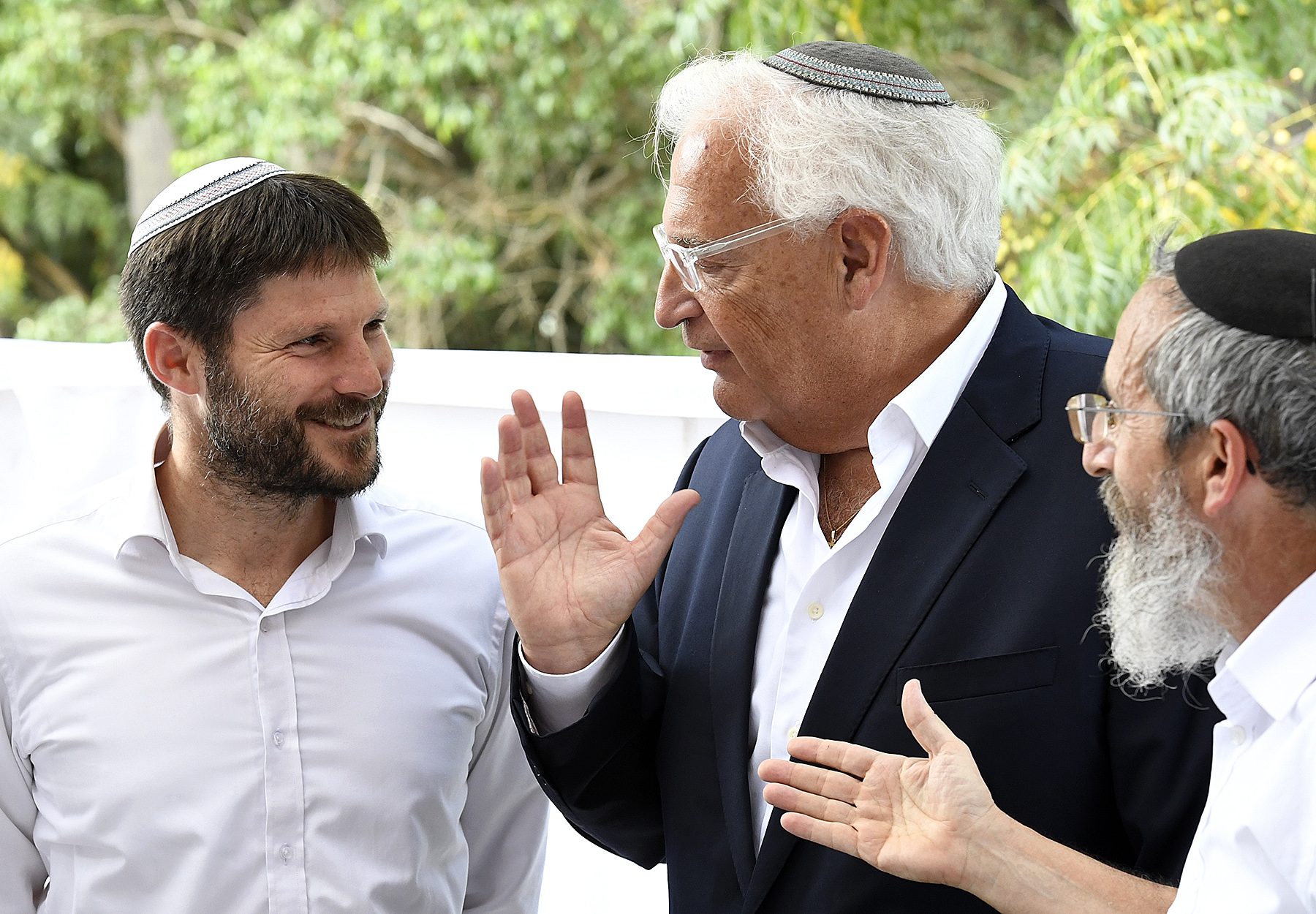
Smotrich with United States Ambassador to Israel David M. Friedman during a visit to Hesder Yeshiva of Sderot, October 2017

Smotrich was born in Haspin, a religious Israeli settlement in the Israeli-occupied Golan Heights, and grew up in the Beit El settlement, deemed illegal under international law, in the Israeli-occupied West Bank. His last name is derived from the Ukrainian town of Smotrych, where he says his ancestors lived. His grandfather Yaakov immigrated to Mandatory Palestine before World War II, and subsequently lost his parents, who drowned on an Aliyah Bet ship trying to reach Palestine, while his grandmother Bruria survived the Holocaust before immigrating to Israel. His other grandfather Shimon was a 13th-generation native of Jerusalem, and his grandmother Sara was born in Metula to a family of Zionist pioneers.

Smotrich's father was an Orthodox rabbi, and Smotrich received a religious education, attending Mercaz HaRav Kook, Yashlatz, and Yeshivat Kedumim. During his short service in the Israel Defense Forces, he served as a secretary in the Operations Division of the General Staff. He earned a BA in law from Ono Academic College, and although he made several public statements proclaiming to have a master's degree in public and international law from the Hebrew University of Jerusalem, he did not complete it. He is licensed as a lawyer. Smotrich is an Orthodox Jew, and is married to Revital, with whom he has seven children. The family lives outside the Kedumim settlement in the West Bank, in a house that was illegally built outside state land and in breach of the settlement's master plan.

== Political activism ==
According to former Shin Bet deputy chief Yitzhak Ilan, who interrogated him during 2005 protests against the Israeli disengagement from Gaza, Smotrich was arrested while in possession of 700 litres of gasoline on suspicion of participating in an attempt to blow up Ayalon Highway, a major arterial road. He was held in jail for three weeks but not charged after refusing to speak. This account was corroborated by Dvir Kariv, who was an agent with Shin Bet at the time.

In 2006 he helped organize the "Beast Parade" as part of protests against a gay pride parade in Jerusalem, although he later admitted regret at the incident.

He is co-founder of Regavim, a non-governmental organization which monitors and pursues legal action in the Israeli court system against constructions undertaken by Palestinians, Bedouins, and other Arabs in Israel and the West Bank without Israeli permits.

== Political career ==
In the build-up to the 2015 Knesset elections, Smotrich won second place on the Tkuma list after party leader Uri Ariel. The party ran in the elections as part of The Jewish Home, with Smotrich placed eighth on its list for the elections. He was elected to the Knesset as the party won eight seats. In 2018, he announced that he would challenge Uri Ariel for the leadership of the National Union faction. In a leadership election held on 14 January 2019, he defeated Ariel in what was described as a "landslide victory". Smotrich won 83 votes, with Ariel winning 40 votes.

He is said to have played a key role in Israeli legislation to legalize the annexation of Palestinian lands and a law banning advocates for the Boycott, Divestment, Sanctions movement from visiting Israel.

Smotrich is a co-sponsor of proposed legislation from 2015 stating that sources of Jewish religious tradition such as the Torah have to be considered when dealing with legal matters that cannot be decided by legislation or court rulings. Other sponsors of this legislation are Miki Zohar from Likud, Yoav Ben-Tzur from Shas, and Nissan Slomiansky from The Jewish Home.

In June 2019 Smotrich campaigned for the Ministry of Justice, saying that he sought the portfolio to "restore the Torah justice system". Prime Minister Benjamin Netanyahu distanced himself from the comments, and appointed openly gay MK Amir Ohana to the post. According to Channel 13, Smotrich subsequently requested the Ministry of Diaspora Affairs, but was not granted the position due to fears that he would strain ties between Israel and the Jewish diaspora. He was appointed the Ministry of Transport and Road Safety.

Smotrich initiated legislation which passed in the Knesset calling for government ministers, Knesset members, judges, senior military personnel, and police officers to declare their assets every six years.

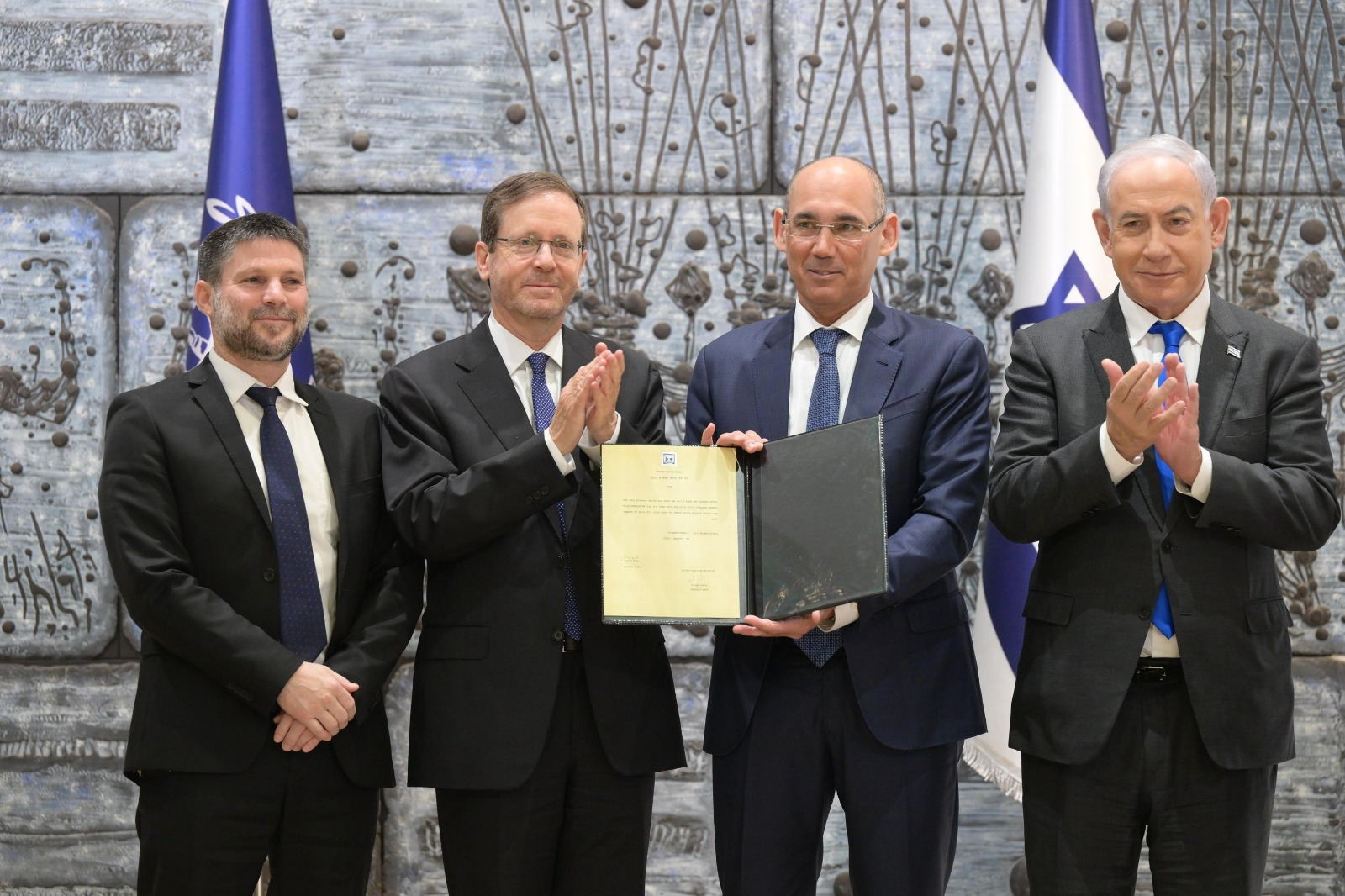
Smotrich with Israeli prime minister Benjamin Netanyahu and President Isaac Herzog, 18 December 2023

On 21 November 2022, in a compromise with the Religious Zionist Party, it was reported that prime minister-designate Benjamin Netanyahu would appoint Smotrich as Minister of Finance in Netanyahu's incoming government.

He was also expected to be given a position within the Ministry of Defense, which would give him "authority over civil affairs in the West Bank". In February 2023 he was entrusted with a large part of the administration of the occupied West Bank. His mission is to develop the settlements and unify their administration with that of the Israeli territory. After a Palestinian attack on settlers, he called for "striking the cities of terror and its instigators without mercy, with tanks and helicopters". He also said that Israel should act "in a way that conveys that the master of the house has gone crazy".

On 30 October 2023 Smotrich froze the transfer of tax revenues to the Palestinian Authority. The move was criticized by the United States.

On 5 November 2023 Smotrich expressed support for the blockade of the Gaza Strip, saying that fuel will not enter Gaza "under any circumstances". He stated that "Gaza will be under Israeli control" after the Gaza war. On 14 November 2023, Smotrich called for a "voluntary emigration" of Palestinians from the Gaza Strip to other countries, stating that Israel would "no longer be able to accept the existence of an independent entity in Gaza".

Smotrich was expected to return to the Knesset in early 2025, pushing out Otzma Yehudit MK Yitzhak Kroizer, which would have balanced out the amount of Knesset seats belonging to Otzma and RZP, following Otzma's withdrawal from the government, but Smotrich withdrew his resignation before it came into effect as negotiations were underway.

He was expected to submit his resignation in April 2025; if he had, Otzma Yehudit MK Yitzhak Kroizer would have been expelled from the Knesset. Smotrich withdrew his pending resignation as Netanyahu made a deal that would enable Almog Cohen to resign instead, with former MK Zvi Sukkot returning to the Knesset.

In February 2026, the government approved Smotrich's directive of increasing the VAT exemption ceiling on imports from $75 to $150, which proved unpopular with business owners as they were set to protest the decision. After the Knesset struck down the approval with a 59–25 vote, Smotrich circumvented the ruling by increasing the VAT rate to $130, citing the measure as a way of lowering the cost of living in Israel. Subsequently, the Knesset, with a vote of 59–23, struck down the proposal for a second time.

=== Sanctions ===
On 10 June 2025 the governments of the United Kingdom, Canada, Australia, New Zealand and Norway announced that they would impose travel bans on Smotrich and freeze his assets alongside National Security Minister Itamar Ben-Gvir, accusing them of inciting settler violence against Palestinians in the West Bank. The decision was criticized by the two ministers and the United States. Smotrich responded to the sanctions by ordering accountant general Yahli Rotenberg to cancel a policy that enabled correspondence between Israeli and Palestinian Authority banks. The move was reported to be an effort to collapse the PA's economy. In July 2025, he was also sanctioned by the governments of Slovenia and the Netherlands. In September 2025, the government of Spain sanctioned him. In June 2026, the governments of Ireland and France sanctioned him.

== Political positions ==
=== Palestine ===
==== West Bank ====
Smotrich is a supporter of expanding Israeli settlements in the West Bank, and opposes Palestinian statehood.

In a 2015 interview Smotrich stated that "The Palestinian Authority is a burden, and Hamas is an asset", noting that, while the PA was harming Israel in international forums, Hamas' status as a terrorist organization meant that "no one will recognize it, no one will give it status at the [International Criminal Court], no one will let it put forth a resolution at the U.N. Security Council".

According to journalist Ron Ben-Yishai, in his dual role as finance minister and adjunct minister in the Ministry of Defense, Smotrich intends to implement ideas set forth in his "Decisive Plan" (2017) which, according to Ben-Yishai, foresees: "Flood[ing], simply so, the areas of Judea and Samaria with settlements and Jewish settlers. When this happens, the Palestinians are supposed to understand that they have no chance to get a state of their own, and they would have to choose between one of the three options – a life of subjugation under Israeli rule, emigration, or a shahid [martyr] death".

In August 2025 Smotrich announced the resumption of the 3400-home settlement plan in the E1 area of the Israeli-occupied West Bank. By creating a physical link between Ma'ale Adumim and Jerusalem, international observers and the Palestinian Authority condemned the approval of the plan as it would seemingly "bury the idea of Palestinian state". Smotrich controversially reiterated this intention, stating before the plan's final approval that the recognition of a Palestinian state "will receive an answer from us on the ground", and the idea of a Palestinian state was "being erased". Alongside the planned resumption of the E1 plan, Smotrich also announced the approval of 350 homes to be built in Asa'el, an Israeli settlement.

Ahead of the intended recognition of the State of Palestine by several nations in September 2025, Smotrich called for Israel to annex "roughly 82 percent of the West Bank". Through potential annexation, Smotrich highlighted that the Palestinian Authority could "continue to run their own affairs" on a local level, but that the "territory would be ours".

As a result of certain clauses of the Disengagement Plan Implementation Law relating to the Israeli disengagement from the Gaza Strip being repealed in March 2023, the Israeli security cabinet approved a proposal backed by Smotrich and Israel Katz in December 2025 for the establishment of 19 new settlements in the West Bank area. The approval included the re-establishment of all former Israeli settlements in the West Bank (notably Kadim and Ganim), with the Higher Planning Committee of the Civil Administration agency also announcing the eventual construction of 126 housing units in Sa-Nur. Smotrich highlighted that "We are eradicating the disgrace of the expulsion from northern Samaria and are settling the Land of Israel anew".

Despite Smotrich hinting that the International Criminal Court (ICC) was seeking to issue an arrest warrant for his activities in the West Bank, he has threatened in response to the unconfirmed warrant to evict the residents of Khan al-Ahmar, a Palestinian Bedouin village in the West Bank area. Located between the Israeli settlements of Ma'ale Adumim and Kfar Adumim and near land to be used for the controversial E1 plan, the village had been previously set to be removed after the Supreme Court of Israel upheld an eviction order for its residents in 2018. Smotrich then urged the Israeli populace to "raze the town and expel its residents to make room for the expansion of Jewish settlements in the area."

In June 2026 Smotrich called for the dismantling of the Palestinian Authority, the abolition of the Oslo Accords, and the removal of the distinctions between Areas A, B and C in the West Bank. He stated that Israel should "take control of the entire territory" and argued that Israel was "destroying the idea of a Palestinian state". Smotrich also said that cancelling the Oslo Accords would lead to the dismantling of the Palestinian Authority and the application of Israeli sovereignty over the West Bank, and suggested replacing the Palestinian Authority with a new military administration. Shortly after, Smotrich signaled his intent of increasing the expansion of settlements in the occupied West Bank by announcing that 2,162 new homes were to be built in areas near Jerusalem, Hebron and Nablus.

==== Anti-Arab and anti-Palestinian sentiment ====
Smotrich's radical views on Jewish-Arab relations are controversial within the Religious Zionist sector.

In July 2015 Smotrich controversially declared in a Knesset Interior committee meeting that developers in Israel should not have to sell homes to Arabs. The meeting took place following accusations that Galil Homes refused to sell homes to Arabs in Ma'alot-Tarshiha, a northern Israeli town. Smotrich defended the developer, saying that, "Anyone who wants to protect the Jewish People and opposes mixed marriages is not a racist. Whoever wants to let Jews live a Jewish life without non-Jews is not a racist." He added that Jews are the ones deprived in Israel because "they don't get free land in the Negev", a reference to Bedouin. "I believe in God's words. I prefer that Jews make a living and wouldn't sell a house to Arabs."

Smotrich has argued that price tag assaults on Palestinian people or property, while criminal in nature, are not to be classified as examples of terrorism, which he defined as "only violence carried out by an enemy within the framework of war against us". Commenting on a specific case, the Duma arson attack, in which a Palestinian family of 3 were killed, and for which a Jewish settler was indicted, Smotrich stated that to brand such deeds as terrorism causes "mortal and unjustified harm to human and civil rights".

In April 2016 Smotrich tweeted that he supports segregation of Arab and Jewish women in hospital maternity wards: "It is natural that my wife would not want to lie down next to someone who just gave birth to a baby that might want to murder her baby in another 20 years." The tweets were condemned by several Israeli politicians, including opposition leader Isaac Herzog and Jewish Home leader Naftali Bennett.

Smotrich has advocated a shoot-to-kill policy for the military when they deal with Palestinians throwing stones. Asked what he would do were another intifada to arise, and a Palestinian child were to throw stones, he replied: "Either I will shoot him, or I will jail him, or I will expel him."

In April 2018 Smotrich tweeted that Ahed Tamimi, a 17-year-old Palestinian serving an eight-month jail sentence for assaulting a soldier, incitement, and interfering with a soldier in the line of duty, "should have gotten a bullet, at least in the kneecap". Twitter responded by suspending his account for 12 hours and asking him to delete the tweet, saying that the tweet was "abusive" and could incite harassment. Smotrich refused to delete the tweet, saying that for Twitter, "freedom of speech is only reserved for one side of the political spectrum", and that he stood by his tweet.

In October 2021 he told Arab lawmakers during a Knesset session that, "You're here by mistake, it's a mistake that Ben-Gurion didn't finish the job and didn't throw you out in 1948."

On his arrival in Great Britain in February 2022, the Board of Deputies of British Jews tweeted him, telling him to go back where he came from.

After the 2023 Huwara rampage by Israeli settlers, Smotrich said, "I think the village of Huwara needs to be wiped out. I think the state of Israel should do it."

In March 2023, speaking from a podium that depicted a map of Israel that incorporated Jordan, Smotrich denied Palestinian identity, saying that there isn't any "Palestinian history or culture", continuing by saying that there is "no such thing as a Palestinian people"; these remarks were decried as "racist, fascist, and extremist" by the Palestinian foreign ministry.

On 27 November 2023 Smotrich said that "there are 2 million Nazis" in the West Bank, "who hate us, exactly as do the Nazis of Hamas-ISIS in Gaza".

In November 2023 he called for Palestinian-free zones around Israeli settlements in the West Bank, saying that Israel must "create sterile security areas around [Jewish] communities and roads and prevent Arabs from entering them, including for the purpose of olive harvesting." In the same month he called for the "voluntary immigration of Gaza Arabs to the countries of the world" and said that "The state of Israel will no longer be able to put up with the existence of an independent entity in Gaza". On 3 January 2024, Smotrich said that "more than 70% of the Israeli public today supports a humanitarian solution of encouraging the voluntary immigration of Gaza Arabs and their absorption in other countries."

On 29 April 2024 Smotrich said, "There are no half measures ... Rafah, Deir al-Balah, Nuseirat – total annihiliation. 'Thou shalt blot out the remembrance of Amalek from under heaven.' There is no place for them under heaven." The Israeli newspaper Haaretz described his comments as a call to genocide.

In August 2024 Smotrich said that the distribution of aid inside Gaza should be controlled by Israel, adding that "no one in the world would let us starve and thirst two million citizens [of Gaza], even though it may be just and moral until they return our hostages" from the October 7 attacks. His comments were condemned by Germany, the UK and the EU.

In May 2025 Smotrich said, about the situation in Gaza, that "Gaza will be totally destroyed" and about the Palestinians that "they will be totally despairing, understanding that there is no hope and nothing to look for in Gaza, and will be looking for relocation to begin a new life in other places." After a report by CNN highlighting over 1,800 buildings in the Gaza Strip being destroyed and Israel controlling 40% of Gaza's biggest city, Smotrich stated in September 2025 that he was discussing the potential division of the territory with U.S. officials. Smotrich stated that a "business plan was set by the most professional people there is and is on President Trump's table and how this thing turns into a real estate bonanza", further acknowledging that "we've done the demolition phase... Now we need to build".

In October 2025, referencing Saudi Arabia, Smotrich said they can "keep riding camels in the sands of the Saudi desert" if the price of normalization is the establishment of a Palestinian state. He later apologized for his remark after it was widely condemned by the coalition and the opposition.

In January 2026 Smotrich announced his opposition to President Trump's plan for the post-war governance in the Gaza Strip after reports of the involvement of Turkey and Qatar in the Board of Peace. Smotrich highlighted that "the countries that inspired Hamas cannot be the ones that replace it. Those who support it and continue to host it even now will not be granted a foothold in Gaza. Period." Smotrich also called for the US-established Civil-Military Coordination Center in Kiryat Gat to be closed, stating his belief that Gaza should be "stormed with full force" in order to remove Hamas.

=== Statements about homosexuality ===
Smotrich opposes gay marriage, and says that he wants to "promote the traditional family". In 2006, Smotrich helped organize a "beast parade", where participants led goats and donkeys through the streets, in opposition to the Jerusalem gay pride parade. In 2015, he referred to homosexuals as "abnormal", stating: "At home, everyone can be abnormal, and people can form whatever family unit they want. But they can't make demands from me, as the state." In the same discussion, he told the audience: "I am a proud homophobe." He later apologized, and retracted his statement, saying: "Someone shouted from the crowd, and I responded inattentively." In July 2015, after a fatal stabbing attack on the Jerusalem gay pride parade, he referred to the march as an "abomination" and a "beast parade". The following month, Smotrich accused LGBT organizations of controlling the media and silencing those who share his conservative views. Ometz, an Israeli NGO, filed a complaint to the Knesset Ethics Committee to intervene and investigate Smotrich's comments.

In a leaked recording of a private conversation published in January 2023 by Israeli Public Broadcasting Corporation, he said: "I won't stone gays [to death], and you won't force me to eat shrimp", and, in an apparent sarcastic remark, said: "I may be a far-right person, a homophobe, racist, fascist, but my word is my bond". He has stated that gay pride parades are "worse than bestiality".

=== Religious extremism ===
In July 2016 Smotrich stated he was "not willing to recognize Reform conversions and their fake religion". The comment came following the passing of a Knesset bill permitting local religious authorities to bar non-Orthodox from using public mikvahs for conversion ceremonies, which countered a Supreme Court ruling to the contrary.

In June 2019, while pushing to be appointed Justice minister (after the previous Justice minister had been fired), Smotrich stated: "We want the justice portfolio because we want to restore the Torah justice system", and that the country should aspire to run itself as "in the days of King David".

In August 2019 Smotrich stated: "We [Orthodox Jews] all would want the State of Israel to be run according to the Torah and Jewish law; it's just that we can't because there are people who think differently from us, and we have to get along with them." The United Right (a political alliance of right-wing parties, including The Jewish Home and Smotrich's Tkuma) referred to the negative reaction as a "media lynching", arguing that Smotrich "emphasized that he cannot and isn't interested in forcing it on others". However, Smotrich had said: "The government makes decisions that affect us and impedes our liberties every day; so, it is simply about what decisions are in the public interest enough to justify coercion... We, too, can force our needs on others, provided we are convinced ourselves of the validity of our demands."

=== Support for conspiracy theory ===
In November 2022 he voiced support for a conspiracy theory that the assassin of late Israeli prime minister Yitzhak Rabin, right-wing extremist Yigal Amir, was radicalized and incited to carry out the murder by the Israeli security agency Shin Bet. Likud MK and former Shin Bet chief Avi Dichter criticized the statement as "unhinged from reality".

=== Support for judicial overhaul ===
An article by former United States ambassador to Israel Martin Indyk and former Jordanian United Nations High Commissioner for Human Rights Zeid bin Ra'ad in Foreign Policy argued that the insistence of Israeli right-wing Finance Minister Bezalel Smotrich on curbing the powers of the Supreme Court stems from a desire to "more easily enact his vision of an Israel that extends unimpeded from river to sea", as the court had previously impeded the legalization of Israeli settlements built on privately owned Palestinian land.

In line with Smotrich's previous statements of reducing the powers of the judiciary, Smotrich made a controversial statement in December 2025 against Yitzhak Amit, who is currently serving as the President of the Supreme Court of Israel. Widely condemned by Israeli political figures such as Benny Gantz and Yair Golan, Smotrich labeled Amit as a "violent megalomaniac who is stealing Israeli democracy," and vowed to "trample him". With Smotrich doubling down on his comments, Amit acknowledged Smotrich's intention of undermining the judiciary and remarked that Smotrich "crossed a red line", with multiple judges and over 700 academics calling for Smotrich to be dismissed and prosecuted as his comments were construed by the judges as a "threat to the country's democratic infrastructure".

=== Lebanon ===
In March 2026, in the context of the 2026 Iran war, Smotrich called for Israel to annex southern Lebanon up to the Litani, saying that the war "needs to end with a different reality entirely, both with the Hezbollah decision but also with the change of Israel's borders."

In May 2026 Smotrich stated that the Israeli government had approved approximately 2 billion shekels in funding for technological measures aimed at countering drone threats. He also said that Israel should develop additional defensive and offensive solutions involving both state and civilian entities. He was further reported to have said that Israel’s response to suicide drone attacks should include severe retaliatory action, stating that for each such attack, ten buildings in Beirut should be destroyed.

== Notes ==
Party political offices
Preceded by Uri Ariel	Leader of Tkuma; 2019–present	Incumbent
