= 2006 Israeli legislative election =

- 28 March 2006
- All 120 seats in the Knesset; 61 seats needed for a majority
- Turnout: 63.55% (▼4.26pp)
Party	Leader	Vote %	Seats	+/–
Kadima	Ehud Olmert	22.02	29	New
Labor	Amir Peretz	15.06	19	0
Shas	Eli Yishai	9.53	12	+1
Likud	Benjamin Netanyahu	8.99	12	−26
Yisrael Beiteinu	Avigdor Lieberman	8.99	11	+8
National Union–NRP	Benny Elon	7.14	9	−1
Gil	Rafi Eitan	5.92	7	New
UTJ	Yaakov Litzman	4.69	6	+1
Meretz	Yossi Beilin	3.77	5	−1
Ra'am–Ta'al	Ibrahim Sarsur	3.02	4	+2
Hadash	Mohammad Barakeh	2.74	3	0
Balad	Azmi Bishara	2.30	3	0
This lists parties that won seats. See the complete results below.
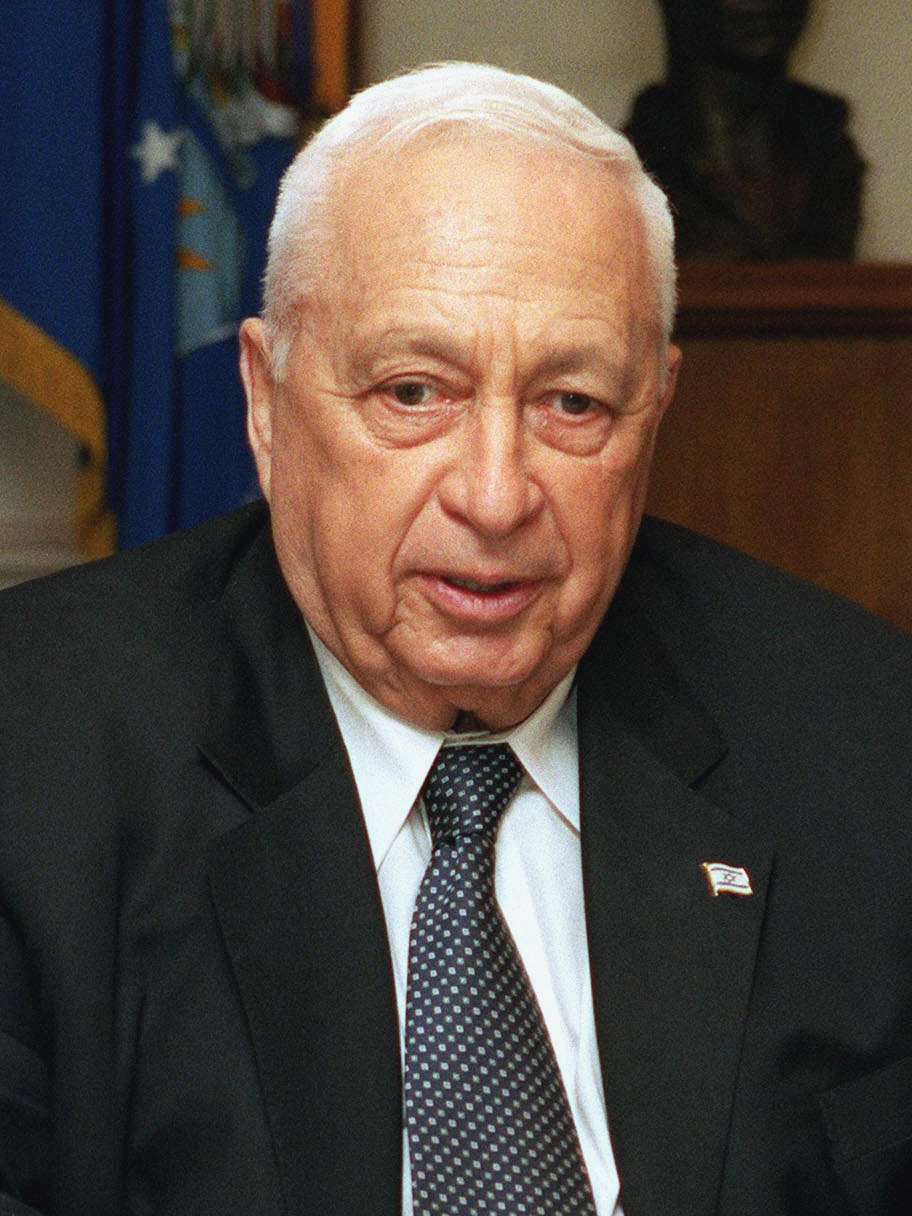

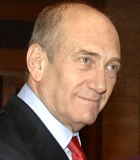
Prime Minister before	Prime Minister after
Ariel Sharon; Ehud Olmert (acting); Kadima (30th)	Ehud Olmert; Kadima (31st)

Elections for the 17th Knesset were held in Israel on 28 March 2006. The voting resulted in a plurality of seats for the then-new Kadima party, followed by the Labor Party, and a major loss for the Likud party.

After the election, the government was formed by the Kadima, Labor, Shas, and Gil parties, with the Yisrael Beiteinu party joining the government later. The Prime Minister was Ehud Olmert, leader of Kadima, who had been the acting prime minister going into the election.

== Background ==
=== 2003 election and later developments ===
In the 2003 elections, Likud, under the leadership of Prime Minister Ariel Sharon, achieved a convincing win by Israeli standards, winning 38 seats in the 120-member Knesset (parliament), with Sharon perceived as tough anti-terrorist leader on the wings of his 2002 Operation Defensive Shield. Labor, led by Amram Mitzna under slogans for "disengagement" from Gaza, won only 19 seats and did not initially join the new government.

Following the 2003 elections Likud suffered severe divisions over several positions taken by Sharon, most notably his adoption of a plan to withdraw Israeli settlers and troops from the Gaza Strip. This was exactly the position taken by Labor and denounced as being defeatist by Sharon prior to the 2003 elections, so it caused tension within the Likud party and in January 2005 Shimon Peres led Labor into a coalition with Sharon to allow the Gaza withdrawal to proceed despite opposition from a majority of Likud members.

=== Fall of the Likud-led government ===
As of the fall of 2005, Peres's Labor Party was providing the votes necessary for the Likud-led 30th Government to maintain its majority support in the Knesset. In Labor's internal leadership election scheduled for early November, Amir Peretz campaigned for the party leadership on a platform that included withdrawing Labor from the Sharon-led coalition. Peretz narrowly defeated Peres in the leadership election on November 9, 2005, and two days later all Labor ministers resigned from the Cabinet and Labor withdrew its support for the Government, leaving it without majority support in the Knesset.

Negotiations between Sharon and Peretz set the election date for 28 March 2006. "I'm letting him [Sharon] choose a date in that period between the end of February and the end of March and whatever date he chooses is acceptable to me, the earlier the better," Peretz said at the time. Sharon said: "As soon as it became clear that the existing political framework was falling apart, I came to the conclusion that the best thing for the country is to hold new elections as soon as possible."

=== Likud split and the formation of Kadima ===
The impending elections raised the prospect of a leadership election within Likud, with former prime minister Binyamin Netanyahu expected to challenge Sharon for the party leadership. In late November, Sharon and a number of other Likud ministers and Knesset members announced that they were leaving Likud to form a new, more centrist party, which was eventually named Kadima. The formation of Kadima turned the election into a three-way race among the new party, Labor and Likud, marking a shift from Israel's tradition of elections dominated by two major parties.

Although Kadima was formed primarily of former Likud members, Peres (having lost the Labor leadership election to Peretz) also announced his support for the new party, and later officially left Labor. Peres cited Sharon's leadership skills as a reason for his party switch.

Polls taken through the end of 2005 showed Sharon's Kadima Party enjoying a commanding lead over both Labor and Likud.

=== Party leadership and list selections ===
Sharon, as founder of Kadima and incumbent prime minister, was universally expected to lead the new party into the March 2006 election. However, on 4 January 2006, Sharon suffered a haemorrhagic stroke, leaving him in a coma. On 31 January 2006, Kadima submitted its list of candidates, with Sharon excluded from the list due to his inability to sign the necessary documents to be a candidate. Ehud Olmert who had become Acting Prime Minister and acting chairman of Kadima when Sharon became incapacitated, now officially became the new party's candidate for prime minister. Peres was placed second on Labor's list of candidates. Foreign Minister Tzipi Livni was placed third on the Kadima list, with the understanding that she would be the senior Vice Premier if Kadima formed the next government.

In the Shinui primaries, Tel Aviv council member Ron Levintal defeated Avraham Poraz for the number 2 spot. Poraz, a close ally of party leader Yosef Lapid, subsequently resigned from Shinui, as did most Shinui Knesset members, forming a breakaway party called Hetz (ha-Miflaga ha-Hilonit Tzionit or 'the Secular Zionist Party'). Lapid resigned as party leader on 25 January 2006, and Leventhal was subsequently elected the new party leader. Neither Shinui nor Hetz received sufficient votes to win any seats in the 17th Knesset. Shinui had won 15 seats in the 2003 election and was the third largest party in the 16th Knesset.

On 30 January 2006 the right-wing National Union (Halchud HaLeumi), a coalition of three small parties (Moledet, Tkuma, Tzionut Datit Leumit Mitchadeshet), submitted a joint list with the National Religious Party. The merged list was headed by Binyamin Elon. The largely Russian immigrant Israel Beytenu (Israel Is Our Home) party separated from National Union and ran on a separate list.

This separation occurred following polls that predicted that, when running separately, these two major rightist blocs would receive between 20 and 25 seats (in the previous elections, they had received only 7), and it turned out to be true: the National Union bloc received 9 seats and Israel Beytenu received 11.

Likud selected Netanyahu as its leader, over then-Defense Minister Silvan Shalom. At Netanyahu's insistence, Shalom and the other remaining Likud ministers resigned from the Olmert-led government in January 2006.

Polls conducted from January through March showed Kadima still enjoying a substantial lead, though somewhat reduced from polls taken under Sharon's leadership.

== Key issues ==
=== The Israeli–Palestinian conflict ===
==== Fighting Palestinian militancy ====
During the al-Aqsa Intifada, more than a thousand Israelis were killed in Palestinian terrorist attacks. Israel's security policy during that time was focused on arresting or killing members of the militant organizations, through frequent military excursions into the Palestinian territories and (somewhat controversially) targeted killings, and to curb the movement of suspected militants – especially would-be suicide bombers – through the use of checkpoints. This policy won the support of the Jewish mainstream, but elements in the Jewish left, as well as the vast majority of the Arab population, vehemently opposed what they saw as excessive response to the security threat. Some claimed that Israel's policy was in fact encouraging more violence from the Palestinian side. Despite the decrease in violence during 2005 and 2006, or perhaps because of it, popular support for the security policy remained high among the Israeli public, which continued to fear suicide bombings and Qassam rocket attacks.

During the 2006 electoral campaign, the center and right parties vowed to continue the relentless fight against the Palestinian militants. Even Labor, which was traditionally known for its dovish views, put "combating terrorism" at the top of its agenda on the Conflict. Opposition to the current security policy, especially the use of targeted killings and the existence of checkpoints on Palestinian soil, comes mainly from Jewish left parties such as Meretz and from the Arab parties.

==== Solutions to the conflict ====
In the wake of the disengagement plan, the political field in Israel split into two roughly distinct groups: those who are in favour of withdrawing from most or all of the West Bank (unofficially nicknamed "Blues"), and those who wish for that area to remain under Israeli control (so-called "Orange"). In particular, Ariel Sharon and his faction left Likud to form Kadima because of their support of ending Israeli control over the West Bank. However, the two groups are also divided internally as to what practical steps need to be taken during the next few years.

- Meretz supported bilateral negotiations as the only path towards peace.
- Labor and Kadima both advocated further negotiations, but the supposed non-existence of a partner for peace on the Palestinian side (following Hamas victory in the 2006 Palestinian elections) brings them to strongly consider "shaping Israel's permanent borders" through a unilateral withdrawal from most of the West Bank, leaving in place the large settlement blocs and the Jewish neighbourhoods in East Jerusalem. These borders will be marked by the completed separation barrier. Kadima leader Ehud Olmert used the term "Convergence Plan" (תכנית ההתכנסות).
- Yisrael Beytenu supported continued Israeli control of most settlements, but offers to cede some Israeli Arab cities and uninhabited territories to the Palestinian Authority in exchange.
- Likud advocated an expansion of the separation barrier to include more territory on the Israeli side, and continued Israeli control of the Jordan Valley, the whole of Jerusalem and the settlement blocs.
- National Union-National Religious Party vehemently opposed any more unilateral withdrawals, and supports the strengthening of Jewish settlements in the West Bank.
- Herut – The National Movement and the Jewish National Front, two fringe nationalist groups, supported a massive population transfer of the Arabs under Israeli control – both Palestinians and Israeli citizens – to neighbouring Arab countries as a solution to the conflict. While Herut supports "voluntary transfer" through the creation of a compensation mechanism, the Front does not rule out forced transfer.

=== Economic and social issues ===
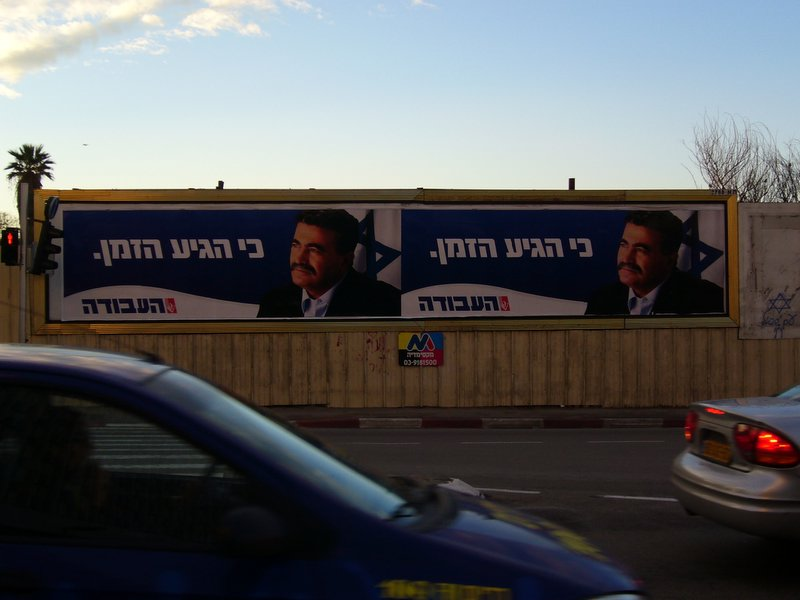
Peretz Labor campaign billboard in Tel Aviv, "Ki Higi'a Hazman" – "Because The Time Has Come"

Since Israel's establishment, the political scene has been dominated by security and peace issues. The major parties were mainly divided by the different approaches with regard to the Arab–Israeli and Israeli–Palestinian conflicts.

The 2006 elections mark the first time a major party – the Labor Party – has placed economic and social issues on top of its agenda. This is mainly attributed to Amir Peretz's surprise victory over Shimon Peres in the November 2005 Labor leadership election; Peretz had left the party a few years earlier to form the socialist One Nation, which had only recently merged into Labor.

Labor's social democratic approach, which includes promises to raise the minimum wage and allocate a pension for every worker, now stands in sharp contrast to the neo-liberal agenda promoted by Likud leader Binyamin Netanyahu. Serving as Finance Minister from 2003 to 2005, Netanyahu led a policy that encouraged economic growth and lower taxes at the expense of Israel's long-running welfare mechanism. This has alienated him from many Likud supporters, which traditionally hail from the lower and middle classes. In the campaign, Netanyahu claimed to have done this to "save the Israeli economy from collapse."

In addition to Labor, the orthodox religious Shas, which has always claimed to champion the poor in Israeli society, also attacked Netanyahu's policies during the campaign, as did a number of small (and often new) socialist parties.

=== Israel as a Jewish and democratic state ===
==== Relations between Jewish Law (Halacha) and the state ====
From 1948 to 2003, religious parties played a part in every coalition formed in Israel. Zionist religious parties focused on maintaining the balance between observants and seculars in issues such as education, Kashrut, keeping the Sabbath, and matrimonial law, while Haredi parties demanded funds for religious scholars and the continued exemption of their followers from military service (decided on by David Ben-Gurion in 1951.) All of this alienated many secular Israelis, who felt their personal freedoms were being infringed upon, and that they were unfairly carrying most of the burden. This led to the rise of Shinui, which at the 2003 elections won 15 out of 120 seats and joined Ariel Sharon's coalition. Shinui failed in making significant changes to the status quo on religious issues, and quit the government in 2005 after Sharon decided to transfer funds to the ultra-Orthodox United Torah Judaism party. An internal quarrel caused most Knesset members from Shinui to form a new party (Hetz); both parties ran in the 2006 elections, although neither of them received any mandates.

Shinui, Hetz, Meretz, and Ale Yarok wish to promote what they see as key secular and democratic principles:

- Allowing businesses to remain open, and public transportation to operate, during the Sabbath;
- Abolishing the Orthodox monopoly on conducting marriage and divorce between Jewish couples (which in fact prevents some couples from getting married in Israel) by instituting civil marriage, including for same-sex couples;
- Allowing the public sale of pork (forbidden under Kashrut laws);
- Committing ultra-Orthodox religious scholars to military service.

The various religious parties, both Zionist (National Religious Party) and Haredi (Shas, United Torah Judaism) strictly oppose these changes. They wish to see Israel's Jewish character strengthened through further enforcement of the Sabbath and changes in the educational system.

==== Relations between Jews and Arabs ====
Israeli Arabs constitute roughly 20% of the population in Israel. Many Israeli-Arab groups claim continued institutional and social discrimination against them in Israel. Because they are not Jews and many identify ethnically with Palestinians their identity often clashes with their citizenship in the Jewish state. There are large disparities in general living standard and education between Israeli Arabs and the non-Arab Israeli population.

The Arab parties, the largest of which are the United Arab List, Balad and Hadash (a Jewish-Arab communist party, with mostly Arab composition and electorate), advocate abolition of all forms of ethnic inequality, and the establishment of a democratic bi-national state.

== Procedures ==
Elections to the Knesset allocate 120 seats by party-list proportional representation, using the d'Hondt method. The election threshold for the 2006 election was set at 2% (up from 1.5% in previous elections), which is a little over two seats.

After official results are published, the President of Israel delegates the task of forming a government to the Member of Knesset with the best chance of assembling a majority coalition (usually the leader of the largest party.) That designee has up to 42 days to negotiate with the different parties, and then present their government to the Knesset for a vote of confidence. Once the government is approved (by a vote of at least 61 members), they becomes Prime Minister.

== Parliament factions ==
The table below lists the parliamentary factions represented in the 16th Knesset.

Name	Ideology	Symbol	Leader	2003 result		Seats at 2005 dissolution
Name	Ideology	Symbol	Leader	Votes (%)	Seats	Seats at 2005 dissolution
Likud	National liberalism Conservatism	מחל	Benjamin Netanyahu	29.39%	38 / 120	29 / 120
Labor-Meimad	Social democracy Labor Zionism	אמת	Amir Peretz	14.46%	19 / 120	21 / 120
Kadima	Liberalism	כן	Ehud Olmert	-	0 / 120	14 / 120
Shinui	Secular liberalism	יש	Ron Levintal	12.28%	15 / 120	2 / 120
Shas	Religious conservatism Right-wing populism	שס	Eli Yishai	8.22%	11 / 120	11 / 120
Hetz	Liberalism; Secularism	חץ	Avraham Poraz	-	0 / 120	11 / 120
National Union	Right-wing populism National conservatism	ט	Benny Elon	5.52% (Note: National Union and Yisrael Beiteinu ran as a joint list.)	4 / 120	4 / 120
Yisrael Beiteinu	Right-wing nationalism Secularism	ל	Avigdor Lieberman	5.52%	3 / 120	3 / 120
Meretz-Yachad	Progressivism; Social democracy	מרצ	Yossi Beilin	5.21%	6 / 120	6 / 120
Mafdal	Religious Zionism	ב	Zevulun Orlev	4.20%	6 / 120	6 / 120
UTJ	Social conservatism	ג	Yaakov Litzman	4.29%	5 / 120	5 / 120
Hadash	Communism; Socialism	ו	Mohammad Barakeh	2.98%	3 / 120	2 / 120
Balad	Palestinian nationalism Left-wing nationalism	ד	Azmi Bishara	2.26%	3 / 120	3 / 120
Ra'am-Ta'al	Arab nationalism Islamism	עם	Ibrahim Sarsur	2.08%	2 / 120	3 / 120

== Extraparliamentary parties ==
Tafnit	פ	Uzi Dayan	New party, anti-corruption
Ale Yarok	קנ	Boaz Wachtel	Advocates legalization of marijuana and ecological issues, legalizing same-sex marriage
Brit Olam	ה	Ofer Lifshits	
Gil	זך	Rafi Eitan	Retiree (pensioner) rights
Organization for Democratic Action	ק	Agbariyyah Asama'	Communist
Green Party	רק	Pe'er Visner	Environmentalist
HaLev	פץ	Eliezer Levinger	Consumer rights
Arab National Party	קפ	Muhammad Kanan	Arab, anti-Zionist
New Zionism	צה	Ya'akov Kfir	Advocates rights of Holocaust survivors
Jewish National Front	כ	Baruch Marzel	Jewish nationalist, Kahanist
Lev LaOlim	פז	Ovadia Fathov	
Herut – The National Movement	נץ	Michael Kleiner	Nationalist
Lekhem	ז	Yisrael Tvito	
Leader	ף	Aleksandr Radko	Russian immigrant, related to Liberal Democratic Party of Russia
Oz LaAniyim	פכ	Felix Angel	Socialist
Atid Ehad	זה	Avraham Neguise	Ethiopian and American immigrants
Justice for All	קז	Yaakov Shlosser	Men's rights
Tzomet	כץ	Moshe Grin	Nationalist

Note: traditional left-right divisions in Israel are different from in most countries, being mostly based on the different positions with regard to security and the Israeli–Palestinian conflict. For example, the left-wing Meretz-Yachad mainly advocates negotiations with the Palestinians along the lines of the Geneva Initiative, while the right-wing National Union is opposed to any territorial concessions, yet both parties have strong histories of tabling social/welfare laws.

== Campaign ==
During the campaign, Meretz attacked Shinui (previously one of Meretz's co-founders) for being a 'passing fad' party, in the same way as Dash, Tzomet and the Centre Party had been.

=== Party slogans ===
Party or alliance	Original slogan	English translation
Likud	"חזק מול החמאס, נתניהו הליכוד."	“Strong against Hamas - Netanyahu, Likud.”
Labor-Meimad	"נלחמים בטרור, מנצחים את העוני/בחינוך/בפנסיה/בשכר המינימום."	"Fighting terrorism, winning against poverty/in education/in retirement/for a minimum wage"
Kadima	"ישראל רוצה קדימה"	"Israel wants to move forward [Kadima]"
Shas	"סדר חברתי חדש"	"A new social order"
Hetz	"חץ חילוני לכנסת"	"A secular Hetz [arrow] for the Knesset"
National Union-Mafdal	"לצאת מהמילכוד – ימין חדש עולה."	"Leaving the Catch-22 [Likud] behind, a new right is rising!
Yisrael Beiteinu	"ליברמן - הולכים על בטוח!"	"Lieberman - playing it safe!"
Yisrael Beiteinu	"Нетаньяху? Нет. Ольмерт? Нет. Либерман? Да."	"Netanyahu? No. Olmert? No. Lieberman? Yes."
Meretz	"מרצ בממשלה/בשמאל, האדם במרכז."	"Meretz in the government/on the left, the human being in the centre."
UTJ	"משפחה יהודית גדולה"	"A large Jewish family"
Hadash	"עולם חד"ש אפשרי"	"A new [Hadash] world is possible"
Shinui	"שינוי - שלטון החוק"	"Shinui - the rule of law"

== Pre-election opinion polling ==
Numbers in the table below are seats, out of a total of 120, as predicted by opinion polls prior to the election.

As the electoral threshold stood at 2%, it was impossible for a party to receive only one seat in the Knesset.

Note: Most Israeli pollsters lump the "Arab" parties together, so that the listed number is the total number of seats that the three main Arab lists (Raam, Balad, Hadash) were expected to obtain. In the event that one or more of the three lists would not have passed the 2% threshold, the representation of these parties would have been one to three fewer seats than listed by the polls.

Party	22 March			23 March		26 March				27 March	
Party	Geocartographia	Jerusalem Post	Teleseker	Dahaf^{2}	Globes- Smith	Dialogue	Maagar Mohot	Dahaf^{2}	Teleseker	Jerusalem Post	Ma'ariv
Kadima 14	33.5	34	37	36	34	36	34	34	34	33.5	34
Likud 27	16.5	15	14	14	15	14	12	13	14	15	14
Labor 21	17.5	19.5	21	20	21	18	19	21	17	20.5	17
Shinui 15	0	0	0	0	0	0	0	0	0	0	0
Shas 11	9.5	11	9	11	10	11	8	11	12	10	12
Arab parties (Ra'am-Ta'al, Balad, Hadash) 8	8.5	9	7	7	7	8	7	7	7	9	7
Meretz-Yachad 6	6	5	5	6	5	6	6	5	5	6	5
National Union – Mafdal 7 & 6 ^{1}	9	10	11	9	9.5	12	8	9	11	9.5	11
Yisrael Beiteinu 7 ^{2}	10.5	10.5	10	11	10.5	7	15	12	12	11	12
United Torah Judaism 5	7	5.5	5	5	5	6	6	6	6	6	6
Ale Yarok 0	0	0	0	0	2	0	1	0	0	0	0
Gil 0	2	0	0	0	2	2	2	2	2	0	2
Tafnit 0	4.5	0	0	0	0	0	0	0	0	0	0
Green Party 0	0	0	0	0	0	0	1	0	0	0	0

^{1} National Union and Yisrael Beiteinu together have 7 seats.

^{2} Dahaf – published in Yedioth Ahronoth (and/or its affiliate site Ynet) with the remark "The votes of the undecided were assigned to parties on the basis of additional questions."

== Results ==
Voter turnout was the lowest in the history of Knesset elections, with only 63.6% of eligible voters voting. (Note: The official turnout is based on the number of eligible voters, however, that number is somewhat misleading since the count of eligible voters includes a significant number of Israeli citizens who in fact cannot vote. This consists mainly of a large number of citizens residing or travelling abroad on the day of the election (and are thus prohibited from voting, unless they are members of the diplomatic corps who are allowed to vote abroad; otherwise they must travel to Israel on election day if they wish to exercise their right to vote). It also includes some deceased voters who have yet to be removed from the voter registration rolls. All Israeli citizens are automatically registered to vote, and thus in Israel there is no distinction between registered voters and eligible voters, as there is in the U.S., for example. Moreover, the rules defining who is allowed to vote by absentee ballot are much more restrictive than those in the U.S., for example. When these factors are taken into account the actual voter turnout is about 5% higher than the figure cited above.) Turnout was down from 68.9% in 2003 and 78.7% in 1999. However, it was higher than the 62.5% in the 2001 elections for Prime Minister.

Party	Votes	%	Seats	+/–
Kadima	690,901	22.02	29	New
Labor–Meimad	472,366	15.06	19	0
Shas	299,054	9.53	12	+1
Likud	281,996	8.99	12	–26
Yisrael Beiteinu	281,880	8.99	11	+8
National Union–National Religious Party	224,083	7.14	9	–1
Gil	185,759	5.92	7	New
United Torah Judaism	147,091	4.69	6	+1
Meretz-Yachad	118,302	3.77	5	–1
United Arab List–Ta'al	94,786	3.02	4	+1
Hadash	86,092	2.74	3	+1
Balad	72,066	2.30	3	0
Green Party	47,595	1.52	0	0
Ale Yarok	40,353	1.29	0	0
Jewish National Front	24,824	0.79	0	New
Tafnit	18,753	0.60	0	New
Atid Ehad	14,005	0.45	0	New
Hetz	10,113	0.32	0	New
Shinui	4,675	0.15	0	–15
Justice for All	3,819	0.12	0	0
Da'am Workers Party	3,692	0.12	0	0
Herut – The National Movement	2,387	0.08	0	0
HaLev	2,163	0.07	0	New
Brit Olam	2,011	0.06	0	New
Lev	1,765	0.06	0	New
Lehem	1,381	0.04	0	New
Tzomet	1,342	0.04	0	0
The New Zionism	1,278	0.04	0	New
Oz LaAniyim	1,214	0.04	0	New
Arab National Party	738	0.02	0	New
Leader	580	0.02	0	0
Total	3,137,064	100.00	120	0
Valid votes	3,137,064	98.44		
Invalid/blank votes	49,675	1.56		
Total votes	3,186,739	100.00		
Registered voters/turnout	5,014,622	63.55		
Source: IDI

=== By city ===
Party	Ariel	Ashdod	Ashkelon	Bat Yam	Bnei Brak	Beersheba	Eilat	Haifa	Herzliya	Holon	Jerusalem	Kiryat Shmona	Modi'in	Netanya	Ofakim	Petah Tikva	Rishon LeZion	Ramat Gan	Tel Aviv	Umm al-Fahm
Kadima	12.4	19.5	19.7	25.1	3.1	21.5	31.4	28.9	35.1	28.9	12	17.6	32.3	23.8	9.1	23.4	32.4	30	27.8	1.4
Labor-Meimad	3.9	10.3	11.2	11.8	1.9	16.7	21.2	16.9	17.5	14.5	10.3	17.8	20.4	10.9	16.3	12.2	15	16.8	19.8	3.7
Likud	24.1	10.1	13	11.6	3	9.5	9.1	8.3	8.7	11.4	10.6	12.1	10.2	12.2	10	11	10.7	10.9	8.7	–
Yisrael Beiteinu	34.6	19.9	22.3	16.9	1.8	20.1	7.3	12.1	5.4	8.7	6.5	16.7	5.1	13.5	16.3	11	10.9	5	4.2	–
Shas	4.2	17.1	15.1	12.3	23.8	14	8.9	3.6	5.6	12.8	15.2	14.3	2.8	12.9	22.2	9.3	6.6	5.5	7.5	0.7
Gil	5	3.2	3.8	9.5	1.6	4.2	7.7	7.1	9.5	11.6	4.2	4.2	8.1	6.3	0.7	9	10.7	13.1	9.2	–
National Union-NRP	8.5	4.4	6.8	5.2	5.9	6.4	4.7	4.2	4.2	3.9	12.2	10.4	8	9.1	6.7	12	3.9	6.8	3.3	–
United Torah Judaism	0.3	9.3	1.5	1.2	56.4	0.9	0.7	2.4	0.8	0.7	18.6	0.4	0.4	2.2	13.3	4	0.8	1	1.3	–
Meretz	0.5	1	1.1	1.5	0.2	1.5	2.2	3.8	6	2.3	3.1	0.8	5.3	1.6	2.2	2.2	2.6	4.3	8.7	2.3
United Arab List-Ta'al	–	–	–	–	–	0.1	–	0.2	–	–	0.1	–	–	–	–	–	–	–	0.7	10.6
Hadash	–	–	–	0.1	–	0.1	0.1	2.8	0.1	–	0.3	0.1	–	–	–	–	–	0.2	0.9	56.1
Balad	–	–	–	–	–	0.1	–	2.9	–	–	0.2	–	–	–	–	–	–	–	0.3	21.7
Sources: Yedioth Ahronoth, Walla.co.il

== Immediate impact and coalition formation ==
For the second time in Israeli history (previously in 1999), no dominant party sat in the Knesset, only two medium (Kadima and Labor) and small-sized ones. Following the election Olmert stated that he prefers entering into a coalition with Labor, and that Peretz is a "suitable partner."

On 2 April both Gil and Meretz recommended to President Moshe Katsav that Olmert become prime minister. The next day, at a joint appearance, Olmert and Peretz announced that Kadima and Labor would be coalition partners and that Peretz would advise the President to tap Olmert as prime minister.

On 6 April President Katsav formally asked Olmert to form a government officially making him Prime Minister-designate. A coalition government was formed consisting of Kadima, Labor, Shas and Gil. Olmert refused to accede to Peretz's demands for the Finance ministry, who was forced to accept the Defense ministry instead.

In October 2006 with the coalition shaken after the 2006 Lebanon War, Olmert brought the right-wing Yisrael Beiteinu into government as well. However, they left the coalition in January 2008 in protest at peace talks with the Palestinian National Authority.

According to the Congressional Research Service:

The March 28, 2006, Knesset election results were surprising in many respects. The voter turnout of 63.2% was the lowest ever. The contest was widely viewed as a referendum on Kadima’s plans to disengage from the West Bank, but it also proved to be a vote on economic policies that many believed had harmed the disadvantaged. Kadima came in first, but by a smaller margin than polls had predicted. Labor, emphasizing socioeconomic issues, came in a respectable second. Likud lost 75% of its votes from 2003 because Kadima drained off supporters. Its decline also was due to Netanyahu, whose policies as Finance Minister were blamed for social distress and whose opposition to unilateral disengagement was unpopular with an increasingly pragmatic, non-ideological electorate.

== See also ==
- List of 17th Knesset members
- 2006 Israeli Labor Party primary
