= Party lists for the 2022 Israeli legislative election =

The 2022 Israeli legislative election was held using closed list proportional representation. Each party presented a list of candidates to the Central Elections Committee prior to the election.

== Balad ==
The Balad list was headed by Sami Abu Shehadeh.

1. Sami Abu Shehadeh
2. Mtanes Shehadeh
3. Dua Hush Tatour
4. Walid Kadan
5. Mahasen Kis
6. Einat Weizman Diamond
7. Saliman El Atika
8. Nahala Tanus
9. Marwa Abbed
10. Wassam Agbaria
11. Abbed ElRahim Fukra
12. Khaled Abu Sakot
13. Khaled Titi
14. Fathi Dika
15. Dalal Silan
16. Kassem Bachri

== Hadash–Ta'al ==
The Hadash–Ta'al list was headed by Ayman Odeh.

1. Ayman Odeh
2. Ahmad Tibi
3. Aida Touma-Suleiman
4. Ofer Cassif
5. Youssef Atauna
6. Samir Bin Said
7. Ghalib Seif
8. Etimad Kadan
9. Naha Washahi
10. Ahmad Shakeer
11. Noa Levi
12. Feeda Nera Tivoni
13. Balil Hamarshee
14. Omer Wahed
15. Ziad Ouida
16. Shadi Shaweer Zidan
17. Waleed Naseer
18. Safit Abu Ria
19. Shadi Bassal Abbas
20. Kaseem Sallem
21. Mounir Hamouda
22. Elmisa Jbira
23. Ahmed Frij

== The Jewish Home ==
The Jewish Home list was headed by Yamina leader Ayelet Shaked.

1. Ayelet Shaked
2. Yossi Brodny
3. Amitai Porat
4. Nitsana Darshan-Leitner
5. Yomtob Kalfon
6. Orna Starkmann
7. Moshe Hania
8. Noy Rosenfeld
9. Gila Ben Naim
10. Jeremy Saltan
11. Yitzhak Dor Levi
12. Ohad Ouzan
13. Shmuel Grady
14. David Yishai Bonfil
15. David Cohen

== Labor ==
The Israeli Labor Party list was headed by Merav Michaeli.

1. Merav Michaeli
2. Naama Lazimi
3. Gilad Kariv
4. Efrat Rayten
5. Ram Shefa
6. Emilie Moatti
7. Yair Fink
8. Ibtisam Mara'ana
9. Omer Bar-Lev
10. Mehereta Baruch-Ron
11. Amir Khnifess
12. Maya Nouri
13. Raz Karni
14. Alassa Baruch-Yasso
15. Gabri Bargil
16. Hadas Shaharabani Saidon
17. Nachman Shai
18. Alice Goldman
19. Tomer Avital
20. Dina Dayan
21. Gil Beilin
22. Einat Colman
23. Yair Tarchitsky
24. Kobi Kisos
25. Sari Yerushalmi
26. Farhan Abu-Riash
27. Simon Alfasi
28. Baruch Lagziel
29. Diklah Cohen
30. Nissim Lasry
31. Shulamit Esbol
32. Yoav Agami
33. Nasak Mansour
34. Yaron Gadot
35. Anat Marciano
36. Roy Mimran
37. Shani Haker
38. Avi Levi
39. Ramot Rina
40. Nir Rosen
41. Nofar Drukman
42. Tal Elovits
43. Shira Razar
44. Nahum Yimeryahu
45. Tali Haim Aviraz
46. Ofer Kornfeld

== Likud ==
The Likud list was headed by Benjamin Netanyahu.

1. Benjamin Netanyahu
2. Yariv Levin
3. Eli Cohen
4. Yoav Gallant
5. Dudi Amsalem
6. Amir Ohana
7. Yoav Kisch
8. Nir Barkat
9. Miri Regev
10. Miki Zohar
11. Avi Dichter
12. Yisrael Katz
13. Shlomo Karhi
14. Amichai Chikli
15. Danny Danon
16. Idit Silman
17. David Bitan
18. Yuli Edelstein
19. Eliyahu Revivo
20. Galit Distel-Atbaryan
21. Nissim Vaturi
22. Shalom Danino
23. Haim Katz
24. Ofir Akunis
25. Tali Gottlieb
26. Hanoch Milwidsky
27. Boaz Bismuth
28. Moshe Saada
29. Eli Dellal
30. Gila Gamliel
31. Ofir Katz
32. May Golan
33. Dan Illouz
34. Ariel Kallner
35. Eti Atiya
36. Amit Halevi
37. Tsega Melaku
38. Osher Shekalim
39. Keti Shitrit
40. Moshe Passal
41. Sasson Guetta
42. Avihai Boaron
43. Yossi Fuchs
44. Afif Abed
45. Shabtai Katash
46. Tzachi Hanegbi
47. Erez Tadmor
48. Keren Barak
49. Gilad Sharon
50. Orly Levy-Abekasis
51. Uzi Dayan
52. Dorit Ohana
53. Moshe Feiglin
54. David Sharan
55. Lior Lasri
56. Lior Katsav
57. Chaya Mena
58. Shai Gaili
59. Osnat Mark
60. Yehezekel Eini
61. Dor Harlap
62. Avraham Shlomo Fuchs
63. Gershon Mesika
64. Ayoob Kara
65. Fateen Mulla
66. Yehonatan Baruch Tal
67. Gadi Yevarkan
68. Felicia Feigel Moualem
69. Edy Cohen
70. Hadass Shon Levi
71. Tali Ploskov
72. Nurit Koren
73. Ran Karmi Buzgalo
74. Boris Apalichuk
75. Lali Deri
76. Fleur Hassan-Nahoum
77. Yaakov Vider
78. Ataa Farhat
79. Susie Ozsinay-Aranaya
80. Dema Taya
81. Dudu Mor
82. Avigdor Hadar
83. Moshe Albert
84. Yochay Shitrit
85. Yosef Kister
86. Baruch Netach
87. Meir Shimon Ohana
88. Ifrah Matana
89. Michael Reif
90. Alon Hadad
91. Yaakov Bar Gil
92. Meir Ohana
93. Yitzhak Danieli
94. Yonatan Gamilel Melamed
95. Zion Lankari
96. Juliette Lasker Marciano
97. Esther Timor
98. Tzvi Igler
99. Gabi Gavriel Allouche
100. Naomi Blumenthal
101. Naftali Naor
102. Akiva Nof
103. Miriam Masry
104. Zeev Ben Yosef
105. Tova Maoz
106. Hedva Spiegel
107. Ziva Ben David
108. Kochava Matityahu
109. Amnon Hever
110. Dalia Igler
111. Michael Kleiner
112. David Moti'i
113. Chaya Shamir
114. Elhanan Vinitzki
115. Bat Sheva HaHermoni
116. Ariel Buchnik
117. Yael Shmargad
118. Tzipora Feinberg
119. Yosef Ahimeir
120. Moshe Nissim

== Meretz ==
The Meretz list was headed by Zehava Gal-On.

1. Zehava Gal-On
2. Mossi Raz
3. Michal Rozin
4. Ali Salalha
5. Yair Golan
6. Gaby Lasky
7. Nitzan Horowitz
8. Mazen Abu Siam
9. Umaima Hamed
10. Ayid Badar
11. Omayma Hammed
12. Adir Bayed
13. Kati Piasecki Morag
14. Omer Schechter
15. Yariv Oppenheimer
16. Shana Orlik
17. Tomer Resnick
18. Eyal Rais
19. Anat Nir
20. Laura Wharton
21. Elias Matanis

== National Unity Party ==
The National Unity Party list was headed by Benny Gantz.

1. Benny Gantz
2. Gideon Sa'ar
3. Gadi Eisenkot
4. Pnina Tamano-Shata
5. Yifat Shasha-Biton
6. Hili Tropper
7. Ze’ev Elkin
8. Michael Biton
9. Matan Kahana
10. Orit Farkash-Hacohen
11. Sharren Haskel
12. Alon Schuster
13. Michel Buskila
14. Eitan Ginzburg
15. Yael Ron Ben-Moshe
16. Akram Hasson
17. Inbar Yehezkeli Blilious
18. Inbar Harush Gity
19. Mufid Mari
20. Dovrat Weizer
21. Gilad Kabilo
22. Ruth Wasserman Lande
23. Shirly Pinto
24. Alon Tal
25. Shlomi Yehiav
26. Zohar Tal
27. Yehudit Uliel Malka
28. Alon Kaiser
29. Shau Zoldan
30. Monica Yael Lev-Cohen
31. Hassan Haiv
32. Shai David
33. Tzila Tamir
34. Sharona Amar
35. Dotan Sofer
36. Amir Shoshani
37. Adiel Ilouz
38. Amir Eliezer
39. Algeria Ben Kesos
40. Tamar Shavit
41. David Abeba Bagshao
42. Hila Arbiv
43. Ilana Kortin
44. Amar Suleman
45. Lili Keidar
46. Malka Mali Levi
47. Raviv Alef
48. Anat Rodonia
49. Noa Mantber
50. Haled Abu Aghagh
51. Yeshayahu Shaked
52. Sinai Shaul Kehat
53. Yaniv Moshe Haliva Toledano
54. Shimi Eliel
55. Ronit Taviv
56. Liad Revah
57. Mordechai Lanziano
58. David Asaiag
59. Bat Sheva Schtrauchler
60. Aviva Guttman Steingold
61. Dan Ben Yehuda
62. Talia Ashkenazi
63. Lior Levi
64. Boaz Hanani
65. Guy Knafo
66. David Drori
67. Dror Museri
68. Haim Karo
69. Shimon Sasi
70. Michael Elhaiani
71. Michal Sara Dor
72. Yohay Yorik Tahor
73. Yuval Lester
74. Ilan Shabtai Faktor
75. Aviv Moses
76. Zeev Sonensohn
77. Daniel Shmuel Avidor
78. Shahar Mei-On
79. Michael Gottlieb
80. Sigalit Hendscher Farkash
81. Tora Schreiber
82. Yosef Simbris
83. Alexander Abramov
84. Ronen Dov Peller
85. Amir Yelinek
86. Hillel Hillman
87. Yigal Even Ziv
88. Netta Meiron
89. Eliyahu Shabtai
90. Eyal Zenkel
91. Hadar Gershonovich Yitzhak
92. Haim Nahmias
93. Adir Vaknin
94. Itamar Vaknin
95. Itamar Yehuda
96. Haim Dekel
97. Yoram Schreiber
98. George Bourgal
99. Yaniv Haimovich
100. Ovadia Hamama
101. Nitzan Edri
102. David Maman
103. Orit Segal
104. Yakir Gerasi
105. Yonatan Dushnitzki
106. Mor Edri Moshe
107. Iyar Tene
108. Omri Avin
109. Tomer Bar Oz
110. Raziel Avraham Edri
111. Bar Yoel
112. Nofar Salman
113. Gonen Tuvia Binyamin Kalman
114. Nadav Kaminer
115. Sharon Dori
116. Michael Shoham Shahaf Emilov
117. Pierre Baranes
118. Meir Yitzhak Halevi
119. Shimshon Shushani
120. Benny Begin

== Religious Zionist Party ==
The Religious Zionist list was headed by Bezalel Smotrich.

1. Bezalel Smotrich
2. Itamar Ben-Gvir
3. Ofir Sofer
4. Orit Strook
5. Yitzhak Wasserlauf
6. Simcha Rothman
7. Almog Cohen
8. Michal Waldiger
9. Amihai Eliyahu
10. Zvika Fogel
11. Avi Maoz
12. Ohad Tal
13. Limor Son Har-Melech
14. Moshe Solomon
15. Yitzhak Kroizer
16. Zvi Sukkot
17. Tzachi Eliyahu
18. Yitzhak Hai Zaga
19. Moshe Ben Zikri
20. Arnon Segal
21. Dror Meir Ohana
22. Devora Gonen
23. Ofra Shuraki
24. Naama Zarbiv
25. Eyal Eliezer
26. Rachel Zinkin
27. Leah Tzruya
28. Meir Seidler
29. Avi Asher
30. Yosef Spizer
31. Yogev Gavrieli
32. David Shmuel Fein
33. Or Elia Yomtovian
34. Eliran Yaish
35. Asaf Yosef Givati
36. Moshe Tazera Bahata
37. Keren Bidosh
38. Moshe Yehiel Roth
39. Tal Rahamim Yoshoviev
40. Reli Nahshon
41. Uri Sholev
42. Mordechai Prizis
43. Amihai Yisrael Sameah
44. Yitzhak Harunian
45. Itamar Moshe Sosover Cohen
46. Shimon Meir Rahamim
47. Haim Meir Druckman

== Shas ==
The Shas list was headed by Aryeh Deri.

1. Aryeh Deri
2. Ya'akov Margi
3. Yoav Ben-Tzur
4. Michael Malchieli
5. Haim Biton
6. Moshe Arbel
7. Yinon Azulai
8. Moshe Abutbul
9. Uriel Buso
10. Yosef Taieb
11. Avraham Betzalel
12. Yonatan Mishraki
13. Netanel Haik
14. Erez Malul
15. Simon Moshiashvili
16. Meir Galant
17. Yaakov Tzedaka
18. Tal Matityahu
19. Asher Nahari
20. Moshe Kaikov
21. Yehuda Butbul
22. Yehuda Ubeidi
23. Natan Elnatan
24. Haim Svarli
25. Elhanan Zvulun
26. Naftali Cohen
27. Hagai Haddad
28. Aryeh Cohen
29. Refael Cohen
30. Meir Cohen Ben Haim
31. Shlomo Azran
32. Yehiel Tzruya
33. Eli Ankonina
34. Yehiel Vaknin
35. Yitzhak Elmalah
36. Maor Meir Ashash
37. Boaz David Biton
38. Shlomo Netanel Peretz
39. Yaakov Maalami
40. Yaakov David Marciano
41. Yehuda Haim
42. Yisrael Ifergan
43. Zvi Asoulin
44. Moshe Vaknin
45. Yaakov Avraham Zcharyahu
46. Ofer Karadi
47. Yigal Dror Haddad
48. Moshe Elmalah
49. Doron Shushan Taktuk
50. Nehorai Lahiani
51. Nissan Lavie
52. Shmuel Marciano
53. Shlomo Zalman Soionov
54. Yaakov Yisrael Rabuch
55. Yisrael Ezri Ramati
56. Asher Shuker
57. Yisrael Ben Shushan
58. Haim Amsili
59. Netanel Elpalas
60. Adiel Moshe Karuf Buharun
61. Hanan Gabi Zigdon
62. Avraham Partush
63. Meir Ruash
64. Yishai Cohen
65. Haim Amron
66. Meir David Baranes
67. Yehuda Danino
68. Shalom Eliram Dadon
69. Yosef Turgeman
70. Shlomo Belhasan
71. Eli Gabay
72. Meir Yisrael Pinhas
73. Shalom Meir Kabesa
74. Yehuda Eliyahu Yisraeli
75. Akiva Hofi
76. Netanel Mor Yosef
77. Nitai Moshe Mashiach
78. Yisrael Shneior
79. Yosef Haim Shaked
80. Eliyahu Cohen
81. Yehonatan Yelin
82. Daniel Lopes
83. Eliyahu Avitan
84. Ariel Yekutiel Golan
85. Yosef Levi
86. Meir Amar
87. Avraham Amram
88. Golan Shalit
89. Yisrael Shabati
90. Daniel Ben Hamo
91. Moshe Ben Naim
92. Otniel Gagi
93. Gavriel Swisa
94. Shimon Ben Naim
95. Binyamin Ariel Asher
96. Mordechai Barmoha
97. Shmuel Yonatan Dadon
98. Ariel Harari
99. Eliyahu Yisrael Shushan
100. Gamliel Gili Golan
101. Roi Rahamim Vaturi
102. Yehuda Menahem Harari Raful
103. Shmuel Yosef Lasri
104. Yaakov Shai Moyal
105. Yitzhak Shlomo Edri
106. Yosef Niazoff
107. Yosef Saltoun
108. Maor Haim Lauri
109. Yoram Sabag
110. David Belhasan
111. Avi Ben Avraham
112. Moshe Shalom Levi
113. Yehoyada Buta
114. Eliyahu Pinhasi
115. Elia Yishai Yisraelov
116. Avraham Cohen
117. Asher Balaish
118. Haim Ben Avraham
119. Moshe Kalfon
120. Haim Aharon Baadani

== United Arab List ==
The United Arab List list was headed by Mansour Abbas.

1. Mansour Abbas
2. Walid Taha
3. Waleed Alhwashla
4. Iman Khatib-Yasin
5. Yasser Hujirat
6. Abdel Karim Masri
7. Ata Abu Madighan
8. Ibrahim Abu Laben
9. Taisir Zoabi
10. Saamar Saamara
11. Yaseer Alharoumi
12. Mohamed Zabidaar
13. Mohamed Haib
14. Ahmed Abu Ijaj
15. Abado Athma
16. Bassam Darwsha
17. Akbil Halaila
18. Abdul Haidi Kharuv
19. Aida Abd El Rahman
20. Nimar Hussein
21. Wahabe Aiwisath

== United Torah Judaism ==
The United Torah Judaism list was headed by Yitzhak Goldknopf.

1. Yitzhak Goldknopf
2. Moshe Gafni
3. Meir Porush
4. Uri Maklev
5. Ya'akov Tessler
6. Ya'akov Asher
7. Yisrael Eichler
8. Yitzhak Pindrus
9. Moshe Roth
10. Eliyahu Baruchi
11. Binyamin Hershler
12. David Ohana
13. Yosef Bahm
14. Yitzchak Reich
15. Yossi Daitsh
16. Avrohom Rubinstein
17. Yechiel Aryeh Weingarten
18. Yaakov Asher Guterman
19. Peretz Abramovich
20. Yitzchak Ravitz
21. Chaim Meir Wiesel
22. Menahem Mendel Shapira
23. Michael Halberstam
24. Moshe David Morgenstern
25. Avraham Zvi Rosgold
26. Michael Melamed
27. Aharon Pinhas Eliyahu Donnat
28. Shlomo Yehuda Goldenthal
29. Dov Asher
30. Eliezer Zvi Rauchberger
31. Efraim Weber
32. Avraham Ben Zion Deutch
33. Avraham Alexander Ziskind Bressler
34. Mordechai Michael Alper
35. David Yehuda Greenwald
36. Shimon Yisrael Kellerman
37. Shmuel Yehuda Gottesman
38. Yisrael Yitzhak Golomb
39. Mordechai Brisk
40. Yosef Shaul Shitrit
41. Yeshayahu Yitzhak Weissman
42. Pinhas Shalom Badush
43. Shlomo Zcharia Kostlitz
44. Yehuda Yabrov
45. Shlomo Deutch
46. Mordechai Zeev Blau
47. Aharon Tierhuis
48. Shabtai Markovitz
49. Hillel Rubinstein
50. Pinhas David Siroka
51. Shimon Goldberg
52. Yitzhak David Brenner
53. Yitzhak Aharon Klein
54. David Salz
55. Avraham Nahman Frankel
56. Meir Jaffe
57. Akiva Uvitz
58. Yisrael Meir Svardalov
59. Efraim Fischel Wiesel
60. Avraham Pinhas Stern
61. Aharon Klein
62. Shlomo Efraim Pollack
63. David Nahman Rothner
64. Mordechai Goldberg
65. Michael Dov Gerlitz
66. Yisrael Mordechai Silverstein
67. Shmuel Shuck
68. Eliyahu Yosef Bruner
69. Shimon Kreuzer
70. Haim Yitzhak Epstein
71. Haim Baruch Wichalder
72. Menahem Mendel Gold
73. Yehezkel Shraga Bankroth
74. Nahum Aharon Gitler
75. Yisrael Haim Cohen
76. Shimon Eliyahu Bergman
77. Yisrael Miller
78. Ofer Elkayam
79. David Spitzer
80. Yehuda Aryeh Pollack
81. Eliyahu Schechter
82. Binyamin Tuvia Lowenstein
83. Yekutiel Zalman Neumann
84. Shlomo Zvi Montag
85. Gdalyahi Scheinin
86. Ofer Ezra
87. Eliezer David Rubinstein
88. Elkana Weissenstern
89. Zeev Farkash
90. Aryeh Yehuda Zisman
91. Yaakov Yosef Ganz
92. Elhanan Frummer
93. Yisrael Leiser
94. David Miller
95. Yaakov Haim Sorger
96. Efraim Weiss
97. Yisrael Frankel
98. Natan Weiss
99. Eliezer Zvi Nahman
100. Shlomo Stern
101. Shimon Blau
102. Yona Moshkovitz
103. Yitzhak Hurvitz
104. Moshe Frank
105. Menahem Shimon Shlomo Aryeh Bernstein
106. Elhanan Arntroy
107. Menahem Klugman
108. Moshe Man
109. Eliyahu Gafni
110. Avraham Yitzhak Mishkovski
111. Yehezkel Shaul Landau
112. Menahem Schwartz
113. Yehuda Roth
114. Yaakov Vizbinski
115. Haim Meir Katz
116. Shimon Haddad
117. Avraham Schwartz
118. Aryeh Zvi Boymel
119. Hanoch Zeibert
120. Eliezer Sorotzkin

== Yesh Atid ==
The Yesh Atid list was headed by Yair Lapid.

1. Yair Lapid
2. Orna Barbivai
3. Meir Cohen
4. Karine Elharrar
5. Meirav Cohen
6. Yoel Razvozov
7. Elazar Stern
8. Mickey Levy
9. Meirav Ben-Ari
10. Ram Ben Barak
11. Yoav Segalovitz
12. Boaz Toporovsky
13. Michal Shir
14. Idan Roll
15. Yorai Lahav-Hertzanu
16. Vladimir Beliak
17. Ron Katz
18. Matti Sarfati Harkavi
19. Tania Mazarsky
20. Yasmin Fridman
21. Debbie Biton
22. Moshe Tur-Paz
23. Simon Davidson
24. Naor Shiri
25. Shelly Tal Meron
26. Yaron Levi
27. Adi Azuz
28. Oz Haim
29. Muhammad Abu Elhega
30. Michal Slawny Cababia
31. Roni Malkai
32. Tomer Viner
33. Ronit Ernefroind
34. Sagit Abu
35. Hana Gol
36. Lydia Hatuel-Czuckermann
37. Ilan Gazit
38. Yael De Lange
39. Hadar Schweizer
40. Tal Magara
41. Peleg Reshef
42. Shai-Li Shasha
43. Shiran Abekasis
44. Dalit Gur Cohen
45. Roi David
46. Zehava Landman
47. Yardena Okman
48. Yitzhak Tzahi Dekel
49. Michal Albo
50. Doron Padeh Tzur
51. Ibrahim Kassam
52. Ronit Yuval
53. Eshter Cohen
54. Shimri Lotan
55. Shlomit Priver
56. Pavel Kagan
57. Avraham Ori Zanko
58. Orit Shani
59. Michael Gorin
60. Carmela Garbiner
61. Nurit Topaz
62. Ziv Warhaftig
63. Demos Gobaza
64. Alon Yehuda Merhav
65. Zohar Gvili
66. Lior Zivan
67. Flori Sterling
68. Rolin Ktilat
69. Ayelet Segal
70. Sara Shira Levi
71. Dov Rosen
72. Vered Amir
73. Tamar Bar Meir
74. Yotam Ram
75. Tami Ben Gideon
76. Yehuda Greenfield Gilat
77. Yovav Gonikman
78. Sapir Pardo Biton
79. Tali Peretz
80. Andrea Wein
81. Yosef Yardeni
82. Netanel Liad Mishan
83. Pinhas Yaron
84. Arnina Shargal
85. Vardi Yuval Lorber
86. Bracha Mizrahi
87. Mazal Shaul
88. Orly Korbinsky-Ben Zvi
89. Yisrael Leibovich
90. Galit Konik-Hoffman
91. Avira Kogus
92. Ilan Appelbaum
93. Tomer Harel
94. Amit Shtrit
95. Eran Davidovitz
96. Alice Yashrik
97. Gavriel Kolodro
98. Yaara Yamit Hana Di Sagni
99. Limor Poker Kobrinsky
100. Hadar Segal
101. Amit Yisrael Ovadia
102. Eden Baruch
103. Sarai Galit Grynspoon
104. Sarit Asraf-Levi
105. Dalit Sabrinsky
106. Mei gal Avinoam Efrati
107. Rachel Geva
108. Naomi Porati
109. Eilon Gendel
110. Ayala Perry-Saada
111. Shai Eliyahu Lieberman
112. Sharona Rodoy
113. Tal Hoiger
114. Batia Bleiberg
115. Yali Kelrich
116. Shulamit Bulkowstein
117. Aliza Rippel
118. Momi-Moshe Namimi
119. Devorah Weinstein
120. Roni Sumak

== Yisrael Beiteinu ==
The Yisrael Beiteinu list was headed by Avigdor Lieberman.

1. Avigdor Lieberman
2. Oded Forer
3. Evgeny Sova
4. Sharon Nir
5. Yulia Malinovsky
6. Hamad Amar
7. Alex Kushnir
8. Batya Kahana-Dror
9. Yossi Shain
10. Limor Magen Telem
11. Elina Bardach-Yalov
12. Sharon Roffe Ofir
13. Stav Boianago
14. Aviv-Haim Cohen
15. David Sandler
16. Michal Oron-Azani
17. Mariah Yacobov
18. Gabi Shmueli
19. Steven Yaakov Rubin
20. Ilan Yitzhak Barkan
21. Yosef Borochov
22. Kinneret Or Zamur Franco

== See also ==
- List of political parties in Israel
