= 2026 Likud primary =

Israeli political party election

A primary election was held by Likud on 17 August 2026 to select its list of candidates ahead of the 2026 Israeli legislative election.

== Background ==
=== Expanding reserved slots ===
Party leader Benjamin Netanyahu sought in May 2026 to expand the number of reserved slots which he could select on the party's electoral list, supporting a plan which would allow him to select 10 candidates. Another option he considered was replacing the primaries entirely with a selection committee, which party member David Bitan strongly opposed.

The Lod District Court postponed a scheduled 15 July vote to approve the plan, ruling that rather than the party's Central Committee, the electorate should be expanded to include Likud voters.

The party's Constitution Committee met on 19 July, approving a plan that gave Netanyahu the right to select eight seats, in addition to allowing him to cancel primaries in the event of "wartime." The Likud court intervened on 26 July, issuing a ruling that did not allow Netanyahu to cancel the primaries.

The Central Committee voted on 27 July in favor of giving Netanyahu eight reserved slots.

The party announced on 11 August that the Likud secretariat would be asked to approve three additional slots for Gideon Sa'ar, Israel Katz and Haim Katz. Haim Katz's slot was frozen by the Likud court the same day. The Likud secretariat approved the slots for Sa'ar and Israel Katz later that day. The Likud court voted to approve Haim Katz's slot the following day. Sitting MK Tally Gotliv was critical of the decision. The reserved slots are reportedly a way for Netanyahu to dilute the strength of certain Likud members, such as Gotliv, Shlomo Karhi and May Golan, who are popular with the party's political base, but would be "less appealing to moderate right-wing and swing voters" during the general election.

Netanyahu ultimately selected nine slots on the list.

=== Regional district slots ===
On 4 August, the Likud court overturned a Central Committee vote from the previous week that would have allowed incumbent lawmakers and ministers to run for regional district spots. By returning those slots exclusively to political newcomers, the ruling eliminated a critical safety net for sitting MKs, making it significantly harder for them to secure realistic, winnable positions on the electoral list.

The Tel Aviv District Court rejected the appeal of Likud MK Afif Abed on 10 August. Abed stated that he would appeal the result. Abed petitioned the High Court of Justice on 12 August, though the judges who heard the case were sceptical of intervening in the decision of an internal party court, with Abed withdrawing the appeal after arguments were heard. The appeal was formally dismissed after the hearing, with the party court's ruling remaining in place.

=== Withdrawals ===
On 13 August, Likud MK Eliyahu Revivo withdrew from the primary in protest of the decision. It was also reported the same day that several Likud MKs were considering defecting to the newly-founded Unity party of Gilad Erdan and Yuli Edelstein, themselves former Likud ministers and MKs. On 14 August, MKs Tsega Melaku and Moshe Passal announced they will not run in the primary.

== Process ==
Party members can vote for different types of seats; all registered party voters can vote for the national list. Regional seats are voted on according to member's geographic location, while there are additional seats set aside for representation, in addition to seats that are reserved for Netanyahu to select.

Voters were able to vote for 12 candidates on the national list, in addition to one candidate in their region.

The regional seats include 12 seats in "Jerusalem, West Bank and Shfela" as well as 10 seats for "Dan and Tel Aviv", four seats "in the Negev", five seats "in the Galilee and valleys", six seats for "the coastal plain", six seats "for "regional councils" and two seats allocated for "the Haifa district." The representation seats include individual seats set aside for young people, immigrants, non-Jews, those with disabilities, and a seat for women who are new to the party.

107 polling sites were open during the election. It is anticipated that the finalized positions on the party's list will shift, due to Netanyahu's reserved seats and district seat allocations.

== Dates ==
The primary was scheduled to be held on 28 July, but it was delayed by the party's Constitution Committee on 29 June until 4 August. The following month, the committee voted to postpone the primary until 17 August.

== Candidates ==
40 candidates competed for national seats, while 84 candidates ran for either the reserved slots or regional positions.

=== Candidates for the national list ===
The list of national and regional seat candidates was released on 13 August.

=== Netanyahu-selected seats ===
1. Israel Katz
2. Gideon Sa'ar (Note: Sa'ar and Buskila were given reserved seats as part of the merger between Likud and New Hope)
3. Haim Katz
4. Michel Buskila
5. Talik Gvili
6. Yaakov Bardugo
7. Elisha Madan
8. David Peter
9. Eli Goldschmidt
10. Itzik Bonzel

A reserved slot was offered to Ofer Winter, but he declined it and formed his own party, Amcha Yisrael.

Oren Dobronsky was given a reserved seat, but he declined it the day before the close of electoral lists.

Amir Avivi was given a reserved seat, but he declined it.

== Polls ==
	Walla / Tel Aviv University	Agam Institute / Jerusalem Post	Elector / DRI
Date	6 January 2026	May 2026	May 2026
Sample	1,223 Likud members	1,097 active Likud members	~1,189 Likud members
#1	Tally Gotliv	Tally Gotliv	Amir Ohana
#2	Amir Ohana	Amir Ohana	Tally Gotliv
#3	Moshe Saada	Moshe Saada	Almog Cohen
#4	Almog Cohen	Eli Cohen	Eli Cohen
#5	Israel Katz	Boaz Bismuth	Boaz Bismuth
#6	Boaz Bismuth	Amichai Chikli	Moshe Saada
#7	Eli Cohen	Israel Katz	Yariv Levin
#8	Amichai Chikli	Miri Regev	Amichai Chikli
#9	Miri Regev	Yariv Levin	Ofir Katz
#10	May Golan	—	Miri Regev
#11	Yariv Levin	—	—
#12	Nir Barkat	—	—
#13	Yoav Kisch	—	—

== Conduct ==
Golan and MK Amit Halevi issued complaints against the Likud Central Election Committee and called for the vote count to be ended at the polling location in Yeroham, claiming that there were "repeated incidents of erasures, alterations, and vote markings" that did not match.

The party did not extend voting hours in the primary, as it had done in previous elections.

Minister Gila Gamliel could lose her high-ranking slot on the Likud list to MK Eti Atiya, with Gamliel's position shifting from the 25th slot to the 35th, following a recount. Gamliel accused Haim Katz, with whom Atiya is allied, of attempting to "steal the vote." Gamliel submitted a police complaint after the party announced that it would hold a recount, following her appeal to the party's internal court.

== Results ==
Turnout was reported to be 53%, with 76,068 party members voting. This marked a five per cent decrease compared to the previous primary. Naama Lazimi, an MK with the opposition party The Democrats, noted her candidacy in her own party's primary earned her more votes than the total votes cast in the Likud primary.

Ministers who are expected to lose their seats in the upcoming election include Nir Barkat, Zeev Elkin, Gila Gamliel, May Golan, Idit Silman and Avi Dichter. MKs who are likely to lose their seats include Amit Halevi, Avihai Boaron, Hanoch Milwidsky, Ariel Kallner and Nissim Vaturi.

According to columnist Gil Hoffman, the primary demonstrated that Netanyahu has no powerful competitors within the party.

The following Likud primary results were reported on 18 August 2026, with a final count on 30 August altering the order for several candidates, including Eti Atiya and Gila Gamliel.

List No.	Determination method	Selected candidate	Votes
1	Party leader	Benjamin Netanyahu (Note: Netanyahu did not participate in the primary.)	N/A
2	National list	Eli Cohen	46,370
3	Party leader's reservation	TBD	N/A
4	Party leader's reservation	Israel Katz	N/A
5	Party leader's reservation	Gideon Sa'ar	N/A
6	National list	Amir Ohana	43,259
7	National list	Yariv Levin	41,765
8	National list — women's guarantee	Miri Regev	38,228
9	Party leader's reservation	TBD	N/A
10	National list	Ofir Katz	35,188
11	Party leader's reservation	Oren Dobronsky	N/A
12	National list	Yoav Kisch	33,677
13	National list	Miki Zohar	33,387
14	National list	Almog Cohen	28,998
15	Party leader's reservation	TBD	N/A
16	National list	Amichai Chikli	28,544
17	National list	Dudi Amsalem	27,787
18	Party leader's reservation	Haim Katz	N/A
19	National list	Moshe Saada	27,665
20	National list — women's guarantee	Tally Gotliv	25,918
21	National list	Shlomo Karhi	24,383
22	National list	Boaz Bismuth	24,283
23	National list	David Bitan	24,256
24	National list	Nir Barkat	23,281
25	National list — women's guarantee	Gila Gamliel	22,087
26	Party leader's reservation	TBD	N/A
27	Jerusalem/Judea-Samaria/Shephelah district	Erez Tadmor	11,086
28	Tel Aviv district	Shlomo Lerner	5,033
29	Party leader's reservation	TBD	N/A
30	Negev district	Moshe Peretz	4,835
31	Galilee & Valleys district	Shuki Ohana	6,185
32	National list	Ze'ev Elkin	23,025
33	National list	Amit Halevi	21,944
34	New-woman representation	Keren Atias Boublil	7,478
35	Regional Councils district	Sharon Saada	2,312
36	Coastal Plain district	Efi Nave	2,606
37	National list	Eti Atiya	21,663
38	National list	Avihai Boaron	21,612
39	Youth representation	Netanel Ohayon	4,370
40	National list — women's guarantee	May Golan	19,332
41	National list	Hanoch Milwidsky	19,545
42	Non-Jewish representation	Mula Mula	4,115
43	Haifa district	Rubin Tzviel	4,047
44	New Immigrant representation	Gavra (Gabi) Worku	3,159
45	National list	Keti Shitrit	18,099
46	Disability representation	Alex Fridman	1,384
