= Vaturi =

Vaturi is a surname. Notable people with the surname include:

- Andrea Vaturi (born 1982), Italian ice dancer
- Nissim Vaturi (born 1969), Israeli politician
- Simone Vaturi (born 1988), Italian ice dancer
