= Almog Cohen =

Almog Cohen may refer to:

- Almog Cohen (footballer) (born 1988), Israeli footballer
- Almog Cohen (politician) (born 1988), Israeli politician
