= Eti Atiya =

Israeli politician

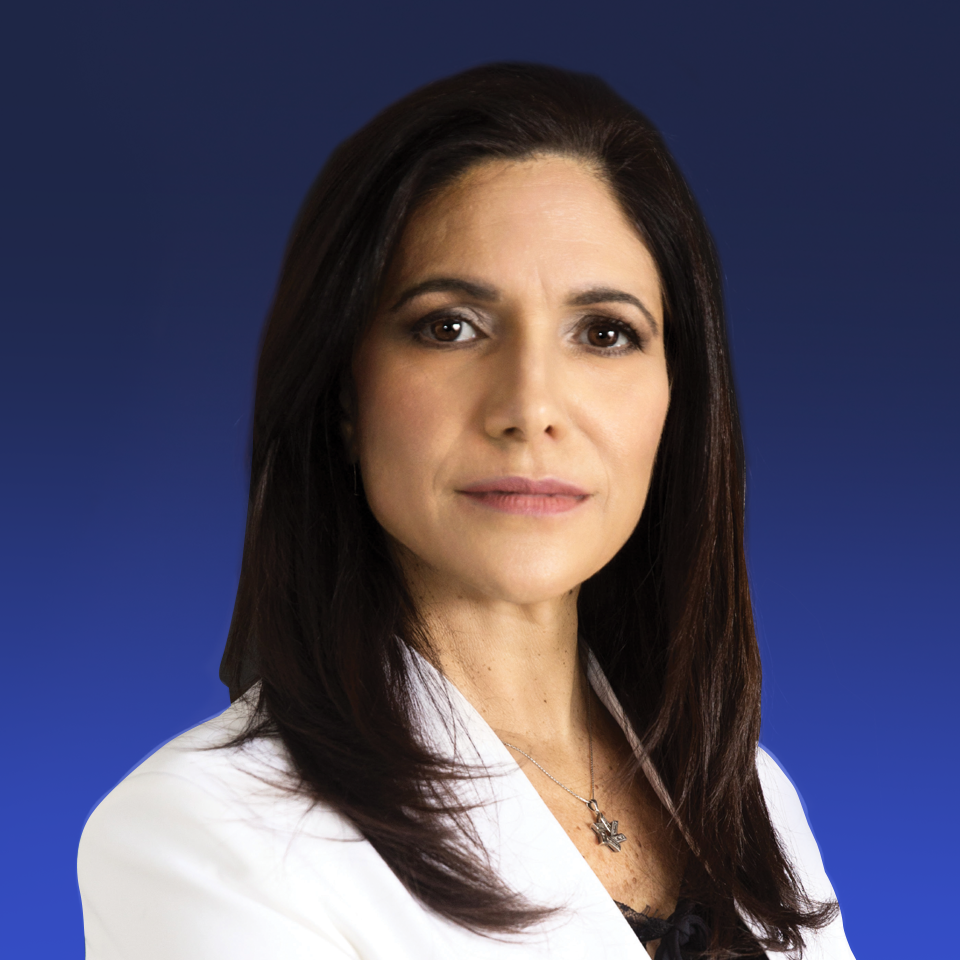
- Atiya in 2018

Faction represented in the Knesset
- 2019–2022: Likud
- 2023–present: Likud

Personal details
- Born: 12 February 1960 (age 66) Lod, Israel
- Education: Ono Academic College (LLB); Bar-Ilan University (MA, BSocSc)

Eti Hava Atiya (Hebrew: אֶתִּי חַוָּה עַטִיָיה; born 12 February 1960) is an Israeli politician who serves as a member of the Knesset for Likud since 2019.

== Early life and education ==
Eti Hava Atiya was born in Lod, Israel, on 12 February 1960. Her family originates from Tunisian Jews in Djerba. She graduated from Ono Academic College with a Bachelor of Laws, from Bar-Ilan University with a Master of Arts in internal auditing and a Bachelor of Social Science.

== Career ==
In the 1980s, Atiya was a welfare official and assistant to the deputy secretary of the National Union of Israel Aerospace Industries Employees (IAI). She was chief of staff to the IAI secretary from 1993 to 2015. She worked for the Office of Internal Auditors from 2007 to 2018, and was chief of staff to the Minister of Labor, Social Affairs and Social Service from 2015 to 2018. In her role as chief of staff she worked for Haim Katz, who she was later politically aligned with in the Knesset.

Likud placed Atiya as the 21st person on their electoral list for the April 2019 election. During her tenure in the Knesset she served as head of the Foreign Workers Committee.

In 2025, Atiya was Israel's representative to a memorial in Daliyat al-Karmel for 13 Druze soldiers that died in the Gaza war; this action was criticised as she was not a minister.

She was initially placed in the 35th slot as a result of the 2026 Likud primary, ahead of the 2026 Israeli legislative election, but was moved to the 25th slot following a recount, displacing Gila Gamliel. Atiya was placed in the 20th slot and was re-elected.

== Political positions ==
The annexation of the West Bank, Israeli settlements in the West Bank, and Greater Israel are supported by Atiya. She supported legislation that would sentence people to five years in prison for cooperating with the International Criminal Court. A letter calling for the prison conditions of Amiram Ben-Uliel to be improved was signed by Atiya.
