= Zvi Sukkot =

Israeli activist and politician

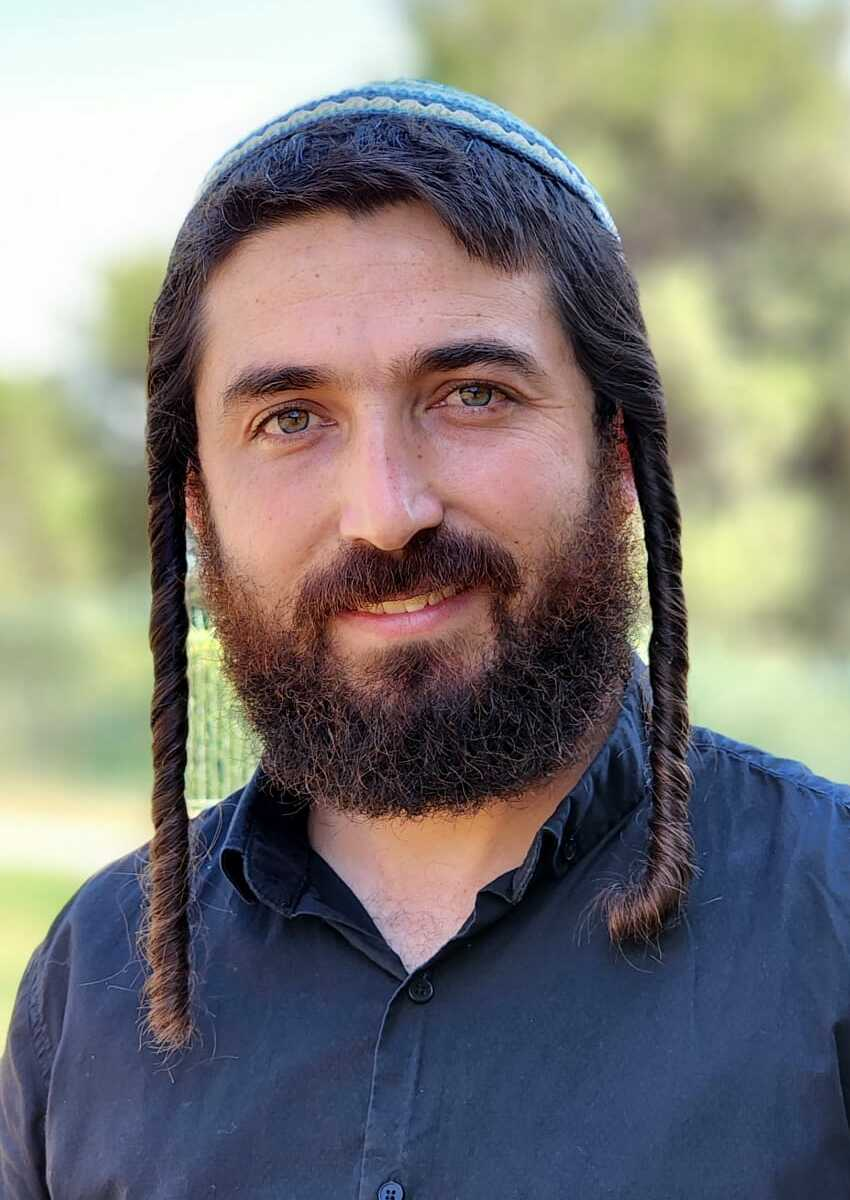
- Sukkot in 2022

Faction represented in the Knesset
- 2023–2025: Religious Zionist Party
- 2025–2026: Religious Zionist Party

Personal details
- Born: 3 October 1990 (age 36) Beitar Illit, Palestinian Territories

Zvi Yedidia Sukkot (Hebrew: צבי ידידיה סוכות; born 3 October 1990) is an Israeli activist, settler and politician who served as a Member of the Knesset for the Religious Zionist Party. Sukkot previously served as the executive director of the far-right Otzma Yehudit party.

== Biography ==
Zvi Sukkot lives in Yitzhar, an Israeli settlement located in the West Bank, and is married, with three children. He was a former representative of the far-right group known as "The Revolt". He is known for his participation in right-wing activism in Israel.

== West Bank activism ==
On 18 January 2010 he was arrested, along with nine other people, as part of an investigation of a mosque arson. In 2012, he was expelled from the West Bank under suspicion that he was part of a group of 12 that had planned and carried out violent attacks against Palestinians and their property. The organization Honenu provided him with legal representation. On 25 December 2015, he organized a demonstration against the Shin Bet in Tel Aviv in which he re-enacted the alleged torture of Jewish prisoners who were suspected to have been involved with the Duma arson attack. On 6 July 2017, he was arrested on suspicion of engaging in "price tagging". On 13 December 2017, he filmed Arab stone-throwers in Yitzhar, and accused "Rabbis for Human Rights" of splicing and editing footage. On 25 December 2017, he was arrested for protesting the demolition of a home in the outpost of Yishuv HaDa'at. On 9 January 2018, he, along with other members from Otzma Yehudit, removed a "terror-inciting" billboard. On 14 January 2018, he, along with Michael Ben-Ari, organized a crowd-funding campaign to purchase drone equipment to film Arab stone-throwers.

== Knesset career ==
Ahead of the 2022 Israeli legislative election, Sukkot was given the sixteenth spot on a joint list between Otzma Yehudit, the Religious Zionist Party and Noam, representing the Religious Zionist Party. Two weeks later, at the onset of the Huwara rampage, Sukkot tweeted that "Huwara's killers' nest needs to be taken care of", and posted a picture of himself among a group of settlers gathering at Tapuach Junction, to the immediate south of Huwara.

Sukkot entered the Knesset on 8 February 2023 as a replacement for Bezalel Smotrich, who resigned under the Norwegian Law. On 1 November 2023, Sukkot was appointed chairman of the Knesset Subcommittee for Judea and Samaria.

Sukkot in July 2024 urged his supporters to protest at Sde Teiman detention camp against the Israeli military police's detention of nine Israeli soldiers suspected of abuse of a Palestinian prisoner; Sukkot then joined other right-wingers in illegally invading the Sde Teiman detention camp, declaring that "we cannot investigate the soldiers until we investigate those who failed" to stop the 7 October attacks.

Sukkot left the Knesset on 21 January 2025 after Amihai Eliyahu returned to the Knesset under the Norwegian Law following Otzma Yehudit's withdrawal from the government. He returned to the Knesset in April as a replacement for Otzma Yehudit MK Almog Cohen.

In a debate with Chaim Levinson aired on Channel 12 in May 2025, Sukkot appeared to celebrate what the Times of Israel called "public indifference" to the killing of Palestinians during the Gaza war. Sukkot said "Last night, almost 100 Gazans were killed. And the question you asked me just now had nothing to do with Gaza. Do you know why? Because it doesn’t interest anyone. Everyone has gotten used to [the fact] that [we can] kill 100 Gazans in one night during a war and nobody cares."

Smotrich announced in December 2025 that Sukkot would be appointed as head of the Knesset's Knesset Committee on Education, Culture and Sports, pending approval from the House Committee. The appointment was approved several days later, with eight votes in favor and six against.

== Controversies ==
In June 2026, in the Arab town of Tuba-Zangariyye in northern Israel, Sukkot tried to break into a school; using a disc saw to cut through the school's fence after the local government locked Sukkot out of the school. Sukkot had previously claimed that the school was teaching "crime." After the visit, Sukkot said "We came to see how they educate here in the schools, and unfortunately, we discovered education for violence, crime, and bullying. We will act to stop all funding for schools that educate for crime." Mouaid Haib, the town's municipal head, accused Sukkot of racism in targeting the school.

In July 2026 Sukkot vandalized a school for orphans in East Jerusalem, where he smashed a ceramic banner displaying a map of historic Palestine and also threw an Islamic textbook to the ground. The Jordanian Senate's Palestine committee condemned the act.

=== Destruction of monument in Madama ===
On 25 August 2026, during a tour escorted by the Israeli military, Sukkot and his aides destroyed a monument commemorating "martyrs" who were killed in the First and Second Intifadas in Madama, Nablus. Sukkot stated the monument was "commemorating terrorists in the murderers' villages" of Madama and Burin and called for the Israeli army to remove the monument a few days prior, though to no avail. He also stated on social media: "Every child who sees a huge monument that glorifies the murderers of Jews every day will dream of becoming a terrorist." The IDF accused Sukkot of having "acted deceptively and manipulatively", in asking for its protection at the location, verifying that resources were diverted to accompany Sukkot only for him to commit the vandalism.

His actions were condemned by Israeli Prime Minister Benjamin Netanyahu, calling it as "unacceptable" and "interferes with the IDF’s ability to focus on its missions against terrorism and incitement." Finance Minister and leader of the Religious Zionist Party, Bezalel Smotrich condemned Sukkot's actions, reportedly telling him that "he should not have acted without proper authorization and authority" and RZP member of Knesset, Ohad Tal, denounced the incident in the party's group on WhatsApp. Other Israeli politicians like Gadi Eisenkot, Yair Golan, and Gideon Sa'ar also condemned Sukkot's actions.
