= Afif Abed =

Israeli Druze politician

- عفيف عبد
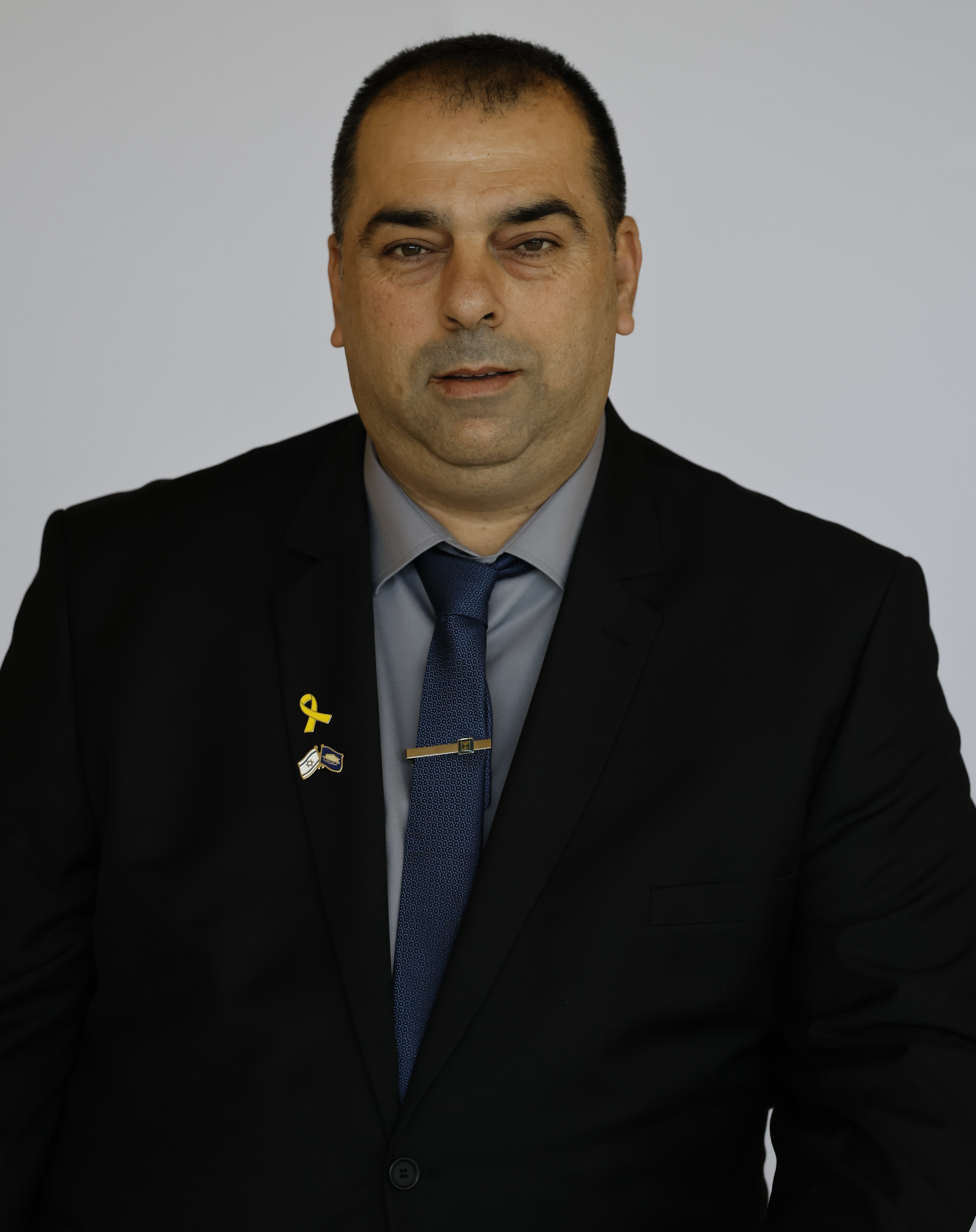
- Knesset portrait, 2025

Faction represented in the Knesset
- 2025–2026: Likud

Personal details
- Born: 9 February 1974 (age 52) Yarka, Israel
- Spouse: Rania Abed
- Children: 8

Afif Abed (Arabic: عفيف عبد, Hebrew: עפיף עבד; born 9 February 1974) is an Israeli Druze politician who served as a Member of the Knesset from January 2025 until November 2026.

== Biography ==
Abed was born in Yarka. He began studying for a general degree at Western Galilee College but has not completed it.

Abed has been a member of Likud's Secretariat and active in the Likud Party since the early 2000s. He ran for the Druze reserved spot in the Likud primaries in 2013 but lost to Ayoob Kara by approximately 10,000 votes.

In 2022, he announced his candidacy for the reserved Druze spot on the Likud list. After Ayoob Kara won the primaries, Abed appealed to the Likud's tribunal, which declared him the winner of the minorities' slot instead of Kara. He was placed in the 43rd position on Likud's Knesset list ahead of the 2022 election.

Abed entered the Knesset following the resignation of Yoav Gallant.

In the 2026 Likud primaries Abed came in a non-realistic seat and wasn't reelected during the 2026 Israeli legislative election.

== Personal life ==
Abed is married and resides in Yarka with his wife and 8 children.
