= Yair Tarchitsky =

Israeli journalist

- יאיר תרכיצקי
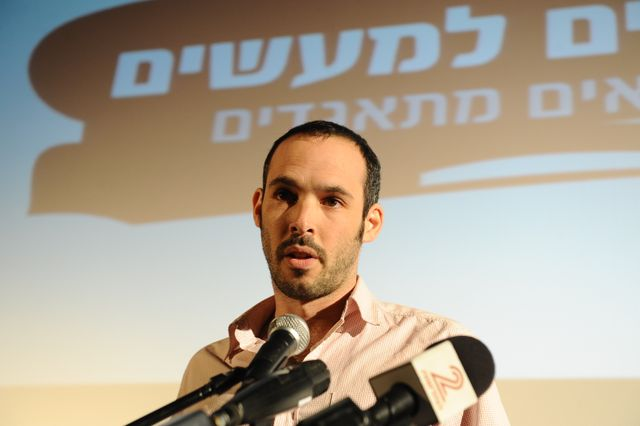
- Born: March 1, 1980 (age 46); Holon, Israel
- Occupation: Journalist
- Known for: Chairman of the Union of Journalists in Israel between 2012 and 2021
- Political party: Labor

Yair Tarchitsky (Hebrew: יאיר תרכיצקי; born March 1, 1980) is an Israeli journalist and the Chairman of the Union of Journalists in Israel. He has written and edited for prominent Israeli media outlets including Maariv, Haaretz, Yedioth Ahronot, Globes, Israel Army Radio, Channel 2, and others. He also serves as a member of the directorate of the Israel Press Council.

== Biography ==
Tarchitsky was born in Holon to Argentinian migrants. He made his first steps as a journalist in the Haaretz website. He then became a labor rights correspondent for the Jerusalem-based newspaper Kol Ha'ir, and then a news editor for Maariv and Haaretz, where he was one of the founders of the workers committee, which was one of the pioneer unionizing processes in the revival of the organized labor movement in Israel.

When he left Haaretz he returned to Maariv, and established a social affairs section in the newspaper's website NRG. After leaving Maariv, Tarchitsky became a freelancer and worked with leading Israeli media outlets as a magazine writer and editor.

While working in Haaretz, he became active in the Journalists Association in Tel Aviv and led a move to revive it. Following his efforts, the Association enlisted 400 young journalists as members. Tarchitsky was known for his critique of the Association and its dysfunction as a union. Increasingly frustrated with the Association's inabilities to overcome its structural flaws, he left it in late 2011 and established the Union of Journalists in Israel as part of the Histadrut, Israel's largest trade union.

From the founding of the Union of Journalists in 2012, Tarchitsky served as its chairman. During his tenure, more than 3,000 journalists joined the union and he unionized more than 25 media outlets, making journalism one of the most unionized sectors in the country. As chairman of the union he led moves to strengthen the status of journalists and freedom of the press, including, among others, struggles against covert advertising, police and army violence towards journalists, and political interference in public broadcasting. In July 2016, he was re-elected for an additional 4-year term as Chairman of the Union of Journalists in Israel, a position he held until 2021. In 2022, Tarchitsky ran in a Labor Party primary meant to select the party's electoral list ahead of a legislative election. He was placed on the 23rd spot in the party's list.
