= Mtanes Shehadeh =

Israeli Arab politician

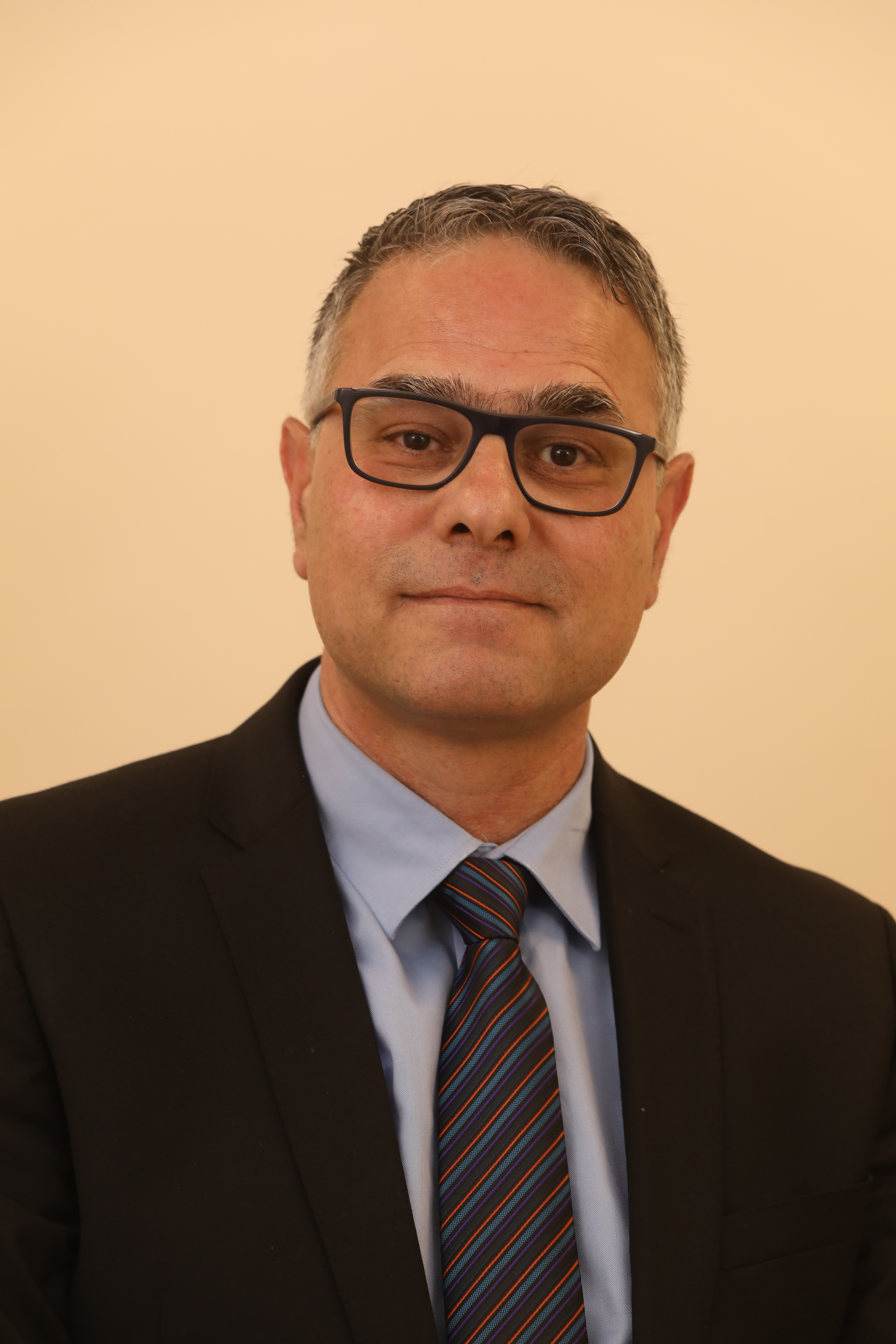
- Shehadeh in 2019

Faction represented in the Knesset
- 2019: Balad
- 2019–2021: Joint List

Personal details
- Born: 25 May 1972 (age 54) Nazareth, Israel

Mtanes Shehadeh (Arabic: امطانس شحادة, Hebrew: מְטַאנֵס שְׁחַאדֵה; born 25 May 1972) is an Israeli Arab politician. A former leader of the Balad, he served as a member of the Knesset from 2019 to 2021.

== Biography ==
Shehadeh grew up in a Christian Arab family in Nazareth. He gained a BA in economic and international relations at the Hebrew University of Jerusalem in 1995, an MA in political science from the University of Haifa, and a PhD in the same subject at the Hebrew University. He worked as a researcher at Mada al-Carmel and became a member of the High Follow-Up Committee for Arab Citizens.

Shehadeh is married with three children and lives in Isfiya.

== Political career ==
In February 2019 he was elected leader of Balad. The party ran a joint list with the United Arab List for the April 2019 Knesset elections, with Shehadeh in second place. He was subsequently elected to the Knesset as the alliance won four seats. Prior to the early elections held in September the same year, Balad joined the Joint List alliance, with Shehadeh placed second on the list. He was re-elected as the alliance won thirteen seats. He was re-elected in the 2020 elections, but did not contest the 2021 elections. He was second on the Balad list for the 2022 elections, but the party failed to cross the electoral threshold.
