= Nissim Vaturi =

Israeli politician

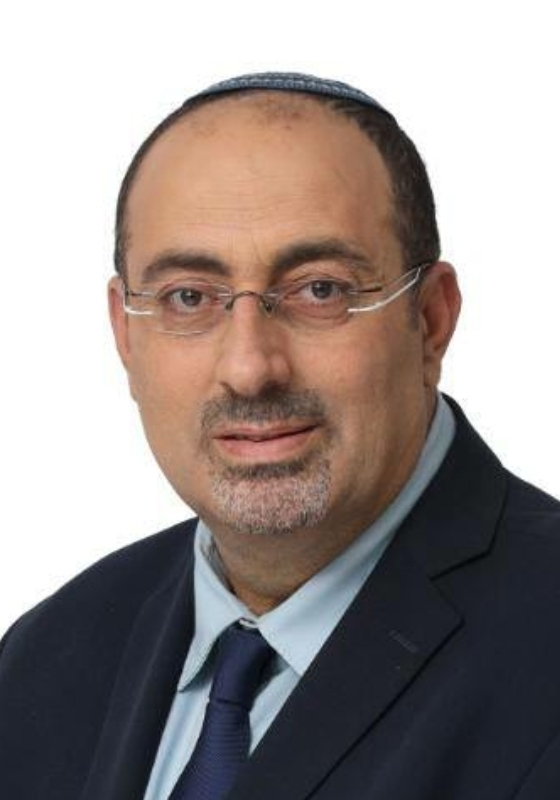
- Vaturi in 2020

Faction represented in the Knesset
- 2020–2021: Likud
- 2022–2026: Likud

Personal details
- Born: 23 October 1969 (age 57) Rishon LeZion, Israel

Nissim Vaturi (Hebrew: ניסים ואטורי; born 23 October 1969) is an Israeli politician. He has served as a member of the Knesset for Likud between 2020 and 2021 and again from 2022 to 2026. He is the deputy speaker of the Knesset.

== Private life and education ==
Vaturi was born in the Ramat Eliyahu neighbourhood of Rishon LeZion to a father who had immigrated from Libya in 1949 and a mother who had immigrated from Iraq in 1951. He grew up in the Ramat Eliyahu neighborhood of the city. During his youth he was a member of the Rishon branch of the Betar youth movement, where he was a cadet of Likud member and former coalition chairman David Bitan.

During his national service in the Israel Defense Forces he commanded an Israeli Air Force aircraft recovery team. He married a teacher, with whom he had seven children. The family moved to Alonei HaBashan in the Golan Heights in 2001 and he ran a cafe in Katzrin, but declared bankruptcy in 2015.

He received a correspondence doctorate from the International University of Business and Law in Kherson, Ukraine in 2008, but the qualification is not recognised in Israel. He was criticized for presenting his PhD without having completed lower degrees. He eventually completed his bachelor's degree in law from the Shaari Mishpat college.

== Political career ==
Vaturi worked as a political advisor to David Bitan. He was placed thirty-seventh on the Likud list for the April 2019 elections, when the party won only 35 seats. He was placed fortieth for the September 2019 elections, in which Likud won 32 seats.

Although he missed out again in the March 2020 elections, in which he was placed fortieth and Likud won 36 seats, he entered the Knesset on 11 December 2020 as a replacement for Gideon Sa'ar, who resigned after leaving Likud to establish his own party. Placed thirty-seventh on the Likud list for the March 2021 elections, he lost his seat as Likud was reduced to 30 seats. For the 2022 elections, he was placed twenty-first on Likud's list. However, he was accused of manipulating his residential address to secure a more favorable position on the list during the primaries. He had initially run as a representative of regional councils but later changed his registered address to the local council of Katzrin, which falls under a different electoral district. This change enabled him to secure the 21st place on the list, as opposed to the 41st place he would have held as a representative of regional councils. Critics within Likud alleged that Vaturi did not genuinely reside in Katzrin and only changed his address for electoral purposes. Although the Likud court dismissed a petition against Vaturi on technical grounds, a police complaint was filed, accusing him of submitting a false declaration and fraudulently obtaining a position. He was subsequently elected to the Knesset again, as Likud won thirty-two seats.

Vaturi was a Deputy Speaker of the Knesset, and a member of the Knesset's Foreign Affairs and Defense Committee.

In the 2026 Likud primary, Vaturi came in 33rd, between Keren Boublil-Atias and Dror Kapah. He was subsequently not on the Likud party list submitted to the Central Elections Committee.

== Controversies ==
In 2022 Vaturi's name was found on a construction project in Tel Aviv, when he was listed as the executing contractor for a recently started project on Basel Street in the city. The real estate developer explained that they were paying the Knesset member for the use of his construction license. However, officials from the Ministry of Construction and Housing emphasized that a contractor was not allowed to let others use their license. Additionally, serving Knesset members are prohibited from engaging in additional work. Vaturi refused to comment.

In 2023 Vaturi claimed that some parents who support "LGBTQ values" are giving their boys dolls to play with to encourage them to be gay. He was condemned by members of his own family.

In September 2025, after the United Kingdom and other countries recognized a Palestinian state in response to Israel’s conduct during the Gaza war, Vaturi wrote on social media: “ Britain, Canada and Australia support the Nazis, then as now!” In actual fact, these countries fought against Nazi Germany in World War II.

=== Comments about the Gaza war ===
On 7 October 2023, Vaturi tweeted that Israelis had one common goal which was "erasing the Gaza Strip from the face of the earth." On 9 October 2023, Vaturi wrote, "To wipe out Gaza. Nothing else will satisfy us. ... Don’t leave a single child there, expel all the remaining ones in the end, so they have no chance of recovery." On 2 November 2023, referring to the war in Gaza, Vaturi wrote, "The war will never end if we don't expel everyone."

Later in November 2023, Vaturi said that Israel had been "too humane" in the Gaza Strip and should instead "burn Gaza." He later claimed to have meant only the terrorists; he had not, however, said 'terrorists' in the tweet or the interview. Vaturi also called on Israel to block water "until the hostages are returned". Vaturi has said of the war, "We were meant to fight this war against Hamas, as is happening now, and luckily for us it came from the heavens."

In January 2024 Vaturi repeated in an interview that "Gaza must be burned," adding that "It is better to burn down buildings rather than have soldiers harmed. There are no innocents there." He added that after the forced displacement of innocent civilians, "one hundred thousand remain. I have no mercy for those who are still there. We need to eliminate them."

On 19 June 2024 Vaturi said anti-government protesters were a "branch of Hamas."

In July 2024, after the Israeli military police visited Sde Teiman detention camp to detain nine Israeli soldiers suspected of abuse of a Palestinian prisoner, Vaturi joined other right-wingers in illegally invading the Sde Teiman detention camp.

In his capacity as a member of the Foreign Affairs and Defense Committee, Vaturi co-signed a letter to Defense Minister Israel Katz demanding that he implement the Generals' Plan in Gaza. Vaturi and seven other committee members recommended that Katz order the IDF to destroy all remaining sources of food, water and energy, followed by "a complete cleansing of the enemy's nests" and the killing of any residents who did not immediately surrender.

In February 2025 Vaturi described Palestinians as "subhumans." He called for the separation of women and children and for killing all adult men in Gaza. and "erase Jenin." In May 2025 the Knesset Ethics Committee ruled that Vaturi's repeated calls to "burn Gaza" did not violate any ethical standards. The Israeli Attorney General declined to prosecute Vaturi for charges of inciting violence against Palestinians. In September 2025, Vaturi called for the expulsion of all Arabs from the West Bank.

== Political achievements ==
In 2023, Vaturi submitted a bill increasing penalties for protection rackets and extortion, which was subsequently passed into law.

In 2025, following significant pressure from Vaturi, the Ministry of Health announced that it would begin requiring salt manufacturers to fortify table salt with Iodine, making iodised salt an Israeli standard.
