= Oz Haim =

Israeli politician

- עוז חיים
- MK Oz Haim, 2026

Faction represented in the Knesset
- 2026: Yesh Atid

Personal details
- Born: 21 May 1978 (age 48) Beersheba, Israel

Oz Haim (born 21 May 1978) is an Israeli lawyer and politician who served as a member of the Knesset for Yesh Atid during 2026.

== Biography ==
Haim was born and raised in Beersheba. He participated in a Nahal group, and upon enlisting, served as an IDF instructor at the School of Military Medicine in Bahad 10. During his time in the army, he participated the Israeli aid delegation during the 1999 İzmit earthquake. After his military service, he acquired a Bachelor's and Master's degree in Law and opened a practice specializing in Intellectual property law. He later closed his practice and was appointed CEO of the Zionist Council in Israel, a body of the World Zionist Organization.

He joined Yesh Atid in 2017, later becoming its head of new media operations. Ahead of the April 2019 Knesset election, Oz was assigned the 60th slot on the electoral list of Blue and White, a political alliance which included Yesh Atid. He received the 55th slot on the alliance's list in September 2019, and the 53rd slot in 2020. The alliance split after the 2020 election, and Oz was given the 27th and 28th slots respectively on Yesh Atid's list in the 2021 and 2022 elections.

Haim entered the Knesset on 7 June 2026 following the resignation of Boaz Toporovsky.

== Personal life ==
Haim lived for a time in Even Yehuda and now resides in Ramat Gan. He is married and has three children.
