= Ohad Tal =

Israeli politician

- אוהד טל
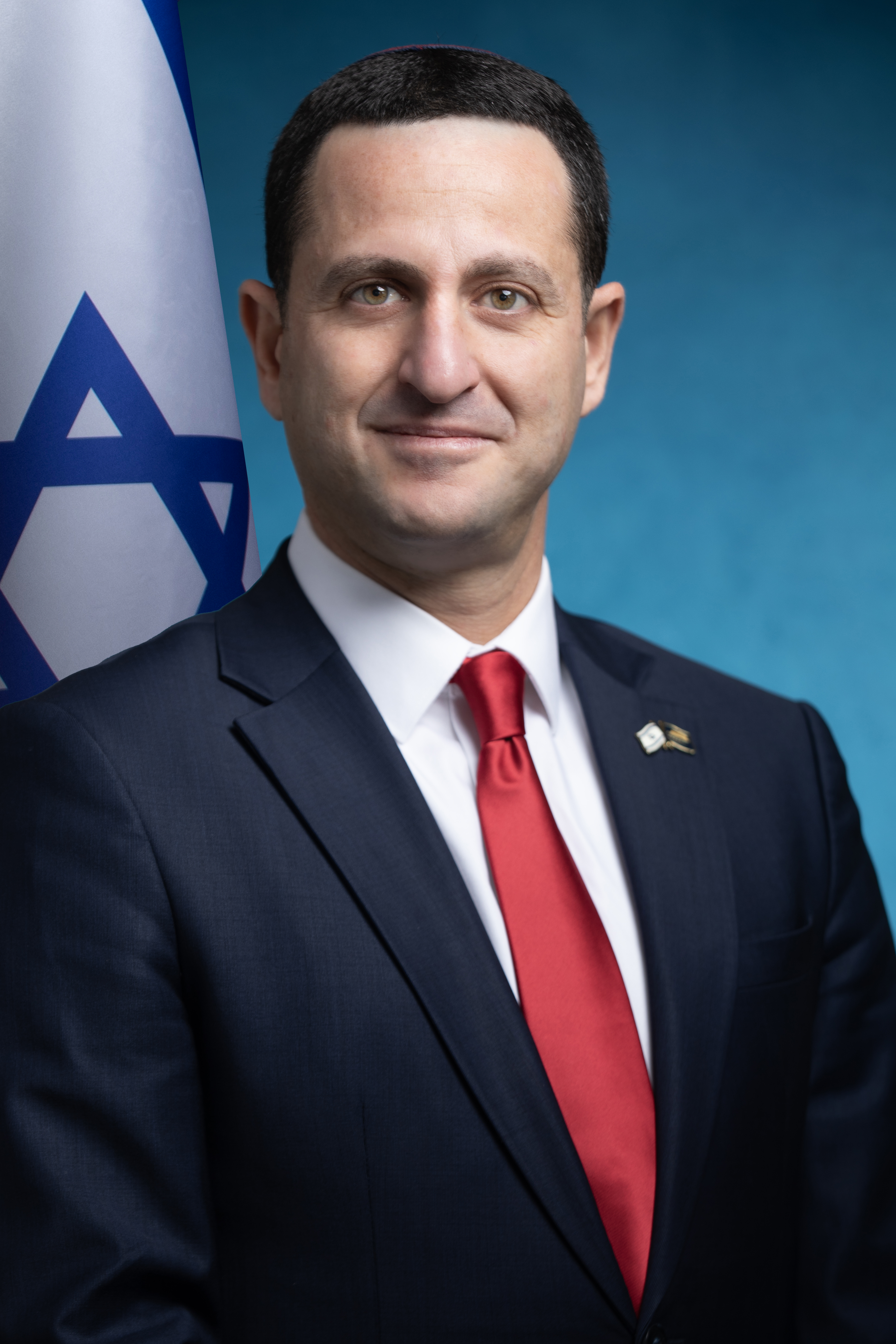

Faction represented in the Knesset
- 2022–2026: Religious Zionist Party

Personal details
- Born: 4 January 1982 (age 44) Eilat, Israel

Ohad Tal (Hebrew: אוהד טל) is an Israeli politician who served as a member of Knesset for the Religious Zionist Party from 2022 until 2026. He headed the Public Enterprises Knesset Committee, and was a member of the Foreign Affairs and Defense Committee, Economics Committee, and Aliyah and Absorption Committee.

== Biography ==
Tal was born and raised in Eilat. After studying at the Mitzpe Ramon Yeshiva High School, he served in the IDF's Armored Corps as a tank commander and participated in Operation Defensive Shield. He holds both an Executive MBA in Public Policy and Administration from Hebrew University and a BA in Education Administration from Bar Ilan University.

Between 2004 and 2006, Tal worked at Elbit Systems, where he was involved in the development of advanced armored vehicle technologies. Until 2013, he led different educational initiatives that sought to connect the international community to Jerusalem as the capital of Israel. In 2013, he embarked as an Emissary (Shaliach) of the Jewish Agency for Israel and World Bnei Akiva movement to the Netherlands.

Following his return to Israel, Tal founded and directed the Religious Zionist Emissary (Shlichut) Center—a coalition of several nonprofit organizations responsible for Diaspora relations and activities abroad among Religious Zionist communities. He was then appointed as Deputy Director of World Mizrachi Movement and led efforts to strengthen Religious Zionist communities around the globe.

In 2021, Tal was appointed Director of World Bnei Akiva, the largest Zionist youth movement in the world. Additionally, he served as a volunteer Chairman of several non-profit educational organizations, as a delegate to the World Zionist Congress and as a member of the Presidium of the WZO General Council.

== Parliamentary career ==
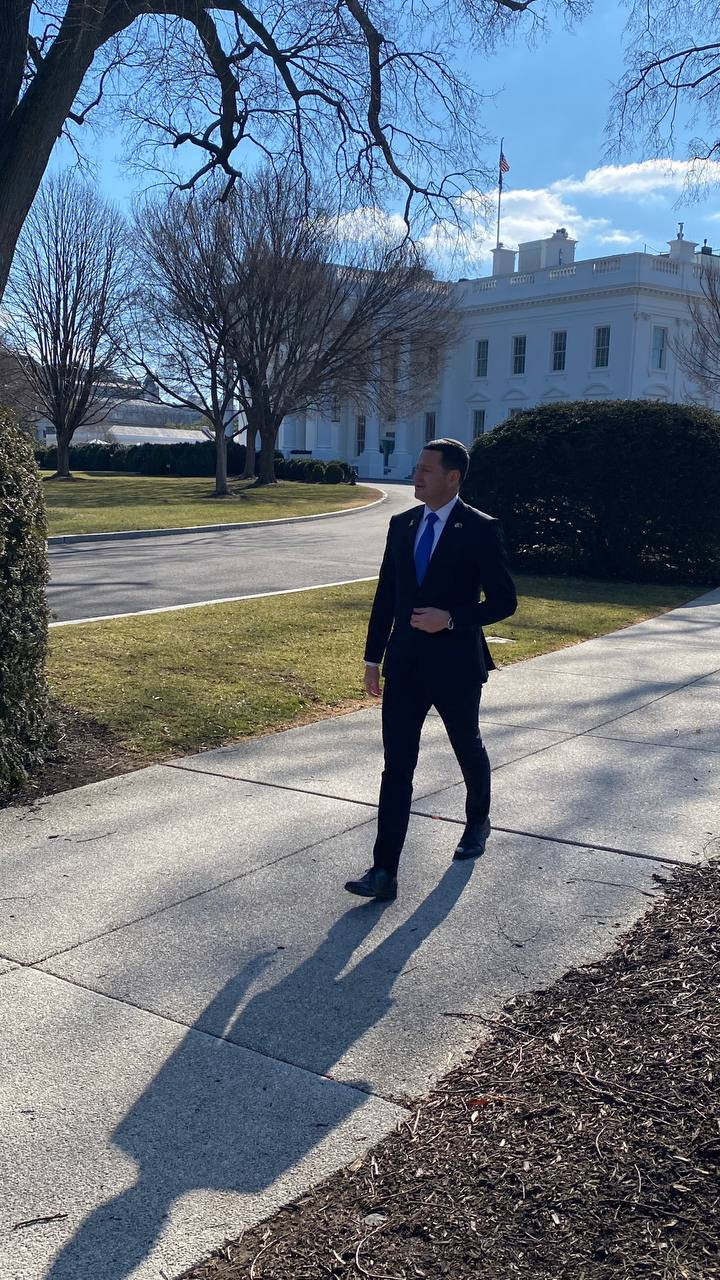
MK Ohad Tal leaving a meeting at the White House, February 2025

On the day that the lists were submitted for the 2022 election, the chairman of the Religious Zionism party, Bezalel Smotrich, announced the placement of Tal as number 12 on the party's list for the Knesset, which ultimately won 14 seats.

On 13 November 2022, Tal began serving as an active member of the Knesset. After the government was formed, Tal began to serve as chairman of the Knesset Committee for Public Enterprises. Under his tenure as chairman, the committee passed, among other things, the digitalization reform of public services, the payment services reform to open up the banking market to competition, and the infrastructure reform to shorten the construction duration of national infrastructure projects.

Tal is a member of the Foreign Affairs and Defense Committee, leading several initiatives from the beginning of the Gaza war to secure Israel's military and security positions. He is also a member of the Aliyah and Absorption Committee and has been active in promoting Israel-Diaspora relations and Israel-US relations.

He heads the Knesset Israel-US Relations Caucus, the Knesset Caucus for Israeli Victory, and is the Chair of the Parliamentary Friendship Groups with Australia, Guatemala, and Honduras.

Tal focuses on issues of national security, foreign policy, Israel–U.S. relations, settlement and sovereignty, free market legislation, and support for reservists and their families.

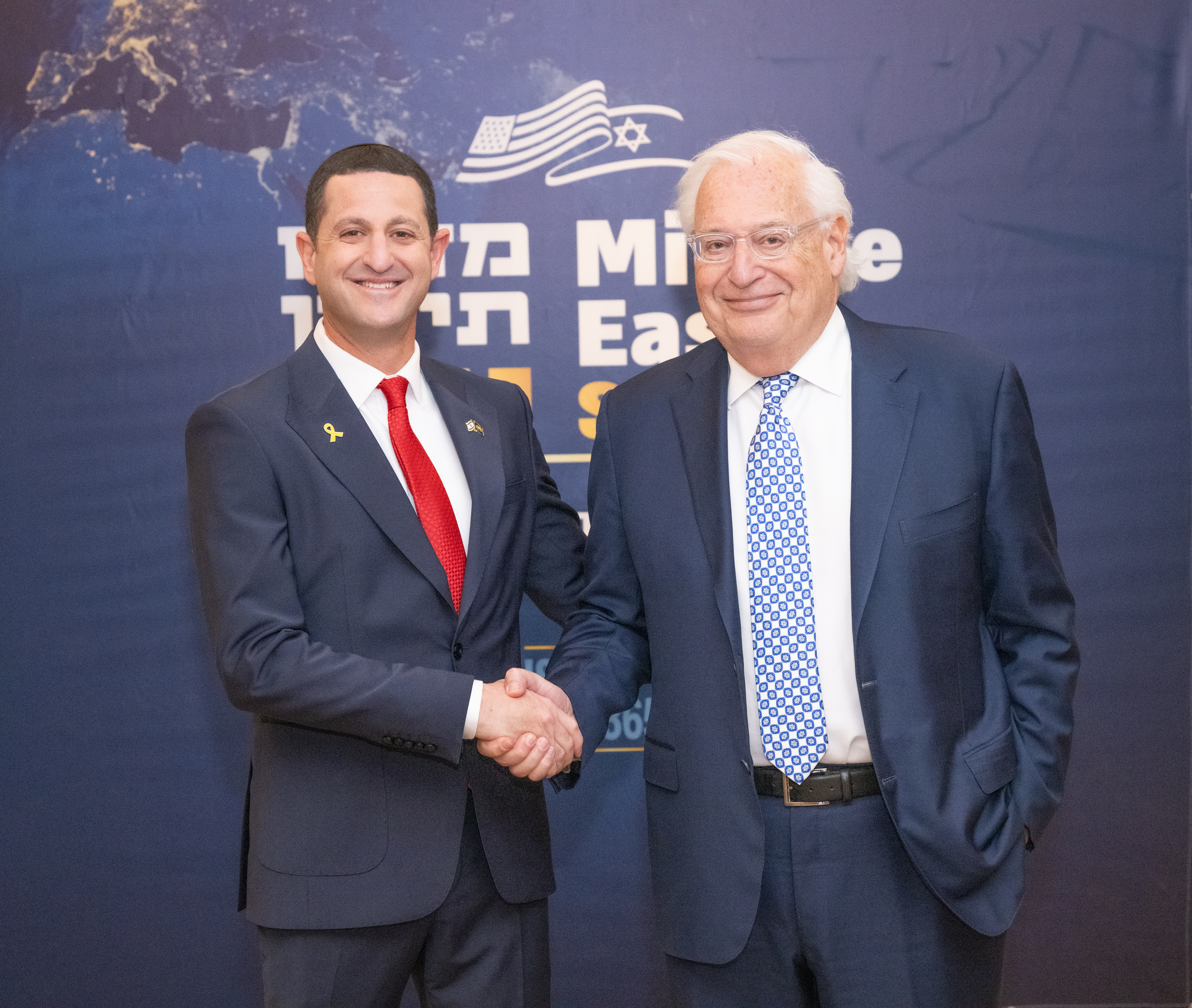
MK Ohad Tal and U.S. Ambassador to Israel David Friedman at the Middle East Summit in Jerusalem, October 2024

Beyond his parliamentary activities, he engages in diplomatic missions on the international stage. In recent years, he has participated in dozens of diplomatic trips to the United States, Australia, Taiwan, and European countries, during which he represented the State of Israel in parliaments, appeared in international media, and met with key political, community, and religious figures, particularly from the Evangelical community in the United States.

In October 2024, he hosted an international summit in Jerusalem in cooperation with former U.S. Ambassador to Israel David Friedman. The summit aimed to strengthen cooperation between Israel and the United States, as well as to promote the application of Israeli sovereignty in the West Bank.

In November 2024, Religious Zionist Party leader Bezalel Smotrich appointed Tal as chairman of the Religious Zionism faction in the Knesset.

Ahead of President Donald Trump's inauguration in January 2025, Tal was invited to speak at an international conference held at Mar-a-Lago, Trump's estate in Florida. In his speech, Tal expressed opposition to the hostage deal signed at that time. In January 2025 he was one of eight members of the Foreign Affairs and Defense Committee to call on Defense Minister Israel Katz to order the IDF to destroy all water, food and energy sources in the Gaza Strip.

After Hamas returned the bodies of the Bibas Family, four slain Israeli hostages, in February 2025, Tal compared Gaza to Sodom, a city in the Hebrew Bible which was destroyed by God for its wickedness. Tal said, "No one there in Gaza protested, no one in this Sodom condemned, no one tried to save them. A collective of murder, and there is no righteous person in Sodom."

In November 2025, he, along with MK members Amit Halevi and Orit Strook, visited the French Consulate in Jerusalem when Tal was caught on camera harassing and berating an employee, warning them that they would "make sure you can't work here." This came after Deputy Mayor of Jerusalem Aryeh King led two demonstrations near the consulate in September and October 2025 over France's recognition of Palestine. In response, Foreign Ministry of France urged the authorities to guarantee security for its diplomatic missions.

== Personal life ==
Tal is married to Tamar (née Shachal), the director of finance and human resources at the "Da'at" network of high schools and religious youth villages. The couple has four children, and they live in Efrat.
