= Boaz Toporovsky =

Israeli politician

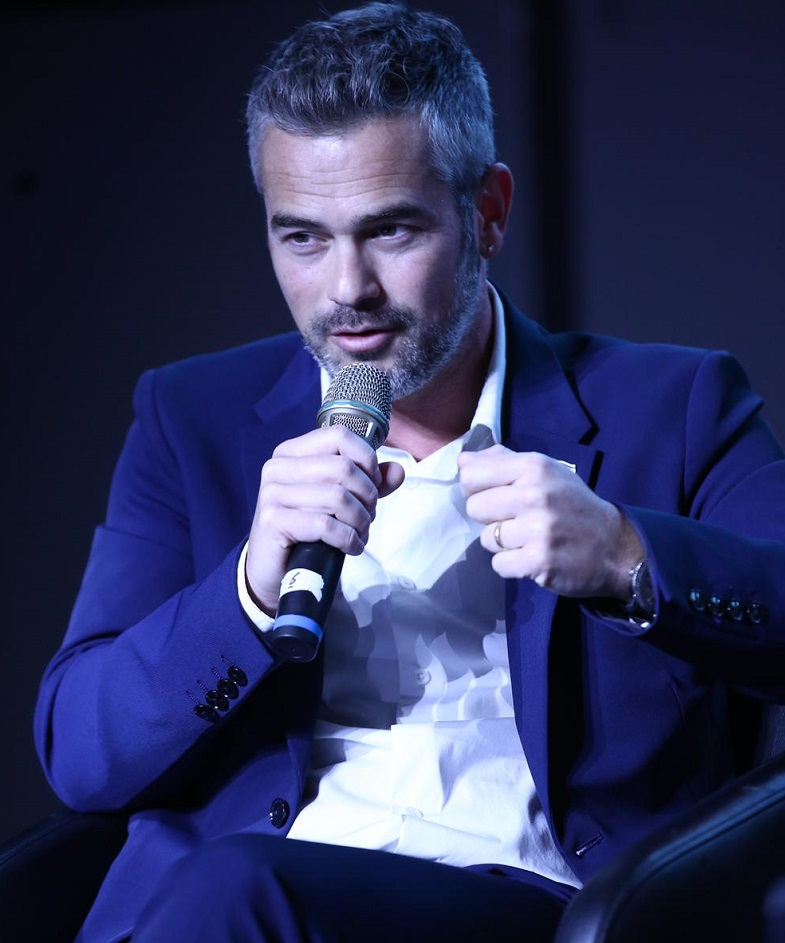

Faction represented in the Knesset
- 2013–2015: Yesh Atid
- 2019–2020: Blue and White
- 2020–2026: Yesh Atid

Personal details
- Born: 17 July 1980 (age 46) Rishon LeZion, Israel

Boaz Toporovsky (Hebrew: בּוֹעַז טוֹפּוֹרוֹבְסְקִי; born 17 July 1980) is an Israeli politician. A former chair of the National Union of Israeli Students, he served as a member of the Knesset for Yesh Atid between 2013 and 2015 and between 2019 and 2026. He served as the coalition whip and chair in the 24th Knesset.

== Biography ==
Toporovsky was born and grew up in Rishon LeZion, where he attended Haviv Elementary School. After completing his mandatory national service in the Israel Air Force, he studied law at Tel Aviv University, graduating with an LLB and a BA in economics, and later gaining an LLM from the same university. During his studies Toporovsky became chairman of the university's student union in 2005, holding the post until 2007. After graduating he worked as a senior advisor for Minister of Social Affairs, Isaac Herzog.

In May 2008 Toporovsky was elected chairman of the National Union of Israeli Students. In the same year, he founded the Tzabar party, heading its list for the 2009 Knesset elections, However, it received only 0.14% of the vote and failed to pass the electoral threshold. The party did win seats on Tel Aviv city council. He remained chairman of the National Union of Israeli Students until 2010. In March 2011 he became chairman of the Issta travel agency, holding the role until February 2013.

In the January 2013 Knesset elections Toporovsky was placed eighteenth on Yesh Atid's list, becoming a Knesset member when the party won 19 seats. During his first term in the Knesset he chaired the Israel–Moldova Parliamentary Friendship Group, and was a member of the Internal Affairs and Environment Committee, the Finance Committee, the House Committee, the Science and Technology Committee and the Joint Committee for the Knesset Budget.

He was placed fourteenth on the party's list for the 2015 elections, losing his seat as the party was reduced to 11 seats. Prior to the April 2019 elections Yesh Atid joined the Blue and White alliance, with Toporovsky placed thirtieth on its list. He re-entered the Knesset after the alliance won 35 seats. He was again placed thirtieth on the Blue and White list for the September 2019 elections, retaining his seat. In the 2020 elections Toporovsky was again placed thirteenth on the Blue and White list and continued to manage the alliance's field office. After the 2021 elections Toporovsky was elected to head the subcommittee for the fight against traffic accidents.

Ahead of the 2021 elections he was placed twelfth on the Yesh Atid list and was re-elected again. With Yesh Atid becoming the largest party in the governing coalition, Toporovsky was appointed acting chairman of the coalition and chairman of the Yesh Atid faction in the Knesset. After Idit Silman resigned as chairman of the coalition, he was appointed as her replacement. In December 2021 Toporovsky was elected to stand for a second time as the head of the subcommittee for the promotion of road safety on behalf of the economy committee.

Toporovsky was re-elected again in the 2022 elections, after which Yesh Atid went into opposition. After the elections, Toporovsky was appointed chairman of the Yesh Atid faction and the Opposition Whip and continued to serve as the head of the sub-committee for the promotion of road safety.

He served as the head of the Yesh Atid parliamentary group.

In 2025 Toporovsky led a Knesset delegation to Taiwan. The Chinese embassy in Israel objected strongly to the trip, labeling Toporovsky a 'trouble-maker' and saying that such trips endanger the foundations of Israel-China relations. The statement also accused Toporovsky of violating the One China principle and said that "If he is not restrained, he will fall and shatter into pieces on the edge of the abyss." The statement also threatened Toporovsky, saying that he should "not delude himself that he can harm China's core interests... without paying a price." the Embassy later denied that it had threatened Toporovsky claiming that it had instead used a "popular Chinese saying." Toporovsky is the chair of the Knesset's Israel-Taiwan Friendship Group and the delegation met with a number of Taiwanese legislators and officials including Vice President Hsiao Bi-khim.

In May of 2026, Toporovsky announced his intention to resign from the Knesset and retire from politics before the 2026 election. His resignation went into effect on 7 June 2026 and he was replaced by Oz Haim.

== Personal life ==
Toporovsky lives in Ness Ziona and is married to Shelly Herman, who participated in MasterChef Israel. The couple have three children.
