= Keti Shitrit =

Israeli politician

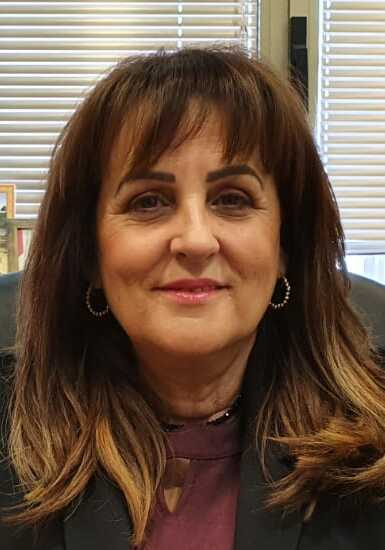
- Shitrit in 2020

Faction represented in the Knesset
- 2019–2022: Likud
- 2023–2026: Likud

Personal details
- Born: Katrin Peretz; 22 January 1960 (age 66) Casablanca, Morocco

Katrin "Keti" Shitrit-Peretz (Hebrew: קְטָרִין שִׁטְרִית-פֶּרֶץ; born 22 January 1960) is an Israeli politician who served as a member of the Knesset for Likud from 2019 to 2022 and again from 2022 to 2026.

== Biography ==
Katrin Peretz was born in Casablanca, Morocco, to a Moroccan Jewish family. Her family immigrated to Israel in 1962 when she was an eighteen month old baby, initially living in a ma'abara in Lod. She was a participant in the Betar youth movement and received a BA in political science and an MA in public administration at Bar-Ilan University, also gaining a teacher training certificate at Beit Berl Academic College. She worked in schools in Beit Shemesh and Dimona and established a school for modern dance in Kfar Saba. She also headed the office of Beit Shemesh mayor Daniel Vaknin between 1993 and 2008, before serving as the city's Financial Director from 2008 until 2010, during which time she also lectured at Bar-Ilan University and the College of Management Academic Studies.

A long-time Likud activist, Shitrit headed the offices of Likud MKs Gideon Sa'ar and Yisrael Katz, before becoming a strategist for Jerusalem mayor Nir Barkat. She was placed thirty-first on the Likud list for the 2009 Knesset elections, but failed to win a seat as Likud won 27 seats. She was thirty-eighth on the joint Likud Yisrael Beiteinu list for the 2013 elections, but the alliance won only 31 seats. The following year she was forced to give up her place on the list (which would have allowed her to enter the Knesset as a replacement for a resigning MK) as she was working for Katz in the Ministry of Transportation. Between 2016 and 2019 she worked as an advisor to Nir Barkat. Prior to the April 2019 elections she was given the thirtieth place on the Likud list, and was elected to the Knesset as the party won 35 seats. She was subsequently re-elected in the early elections in September the same year, and again in 2020 and 2021. However, she lost her seat in the 2022 elections after being placed thirty-ninth on the Likud list. She returned to the Knesset on 15 February 2023 as a replacement for Miri Regev, who resigned under the Norwegian Law.

In 2024, Shitrit told Channel 14 "If you ask me personally, not as a member of the Knesset, I’d flatten Gaza. I have no sentimental feelings about it, because there’s no separating the murderers of women and children from the citizens of Gaza." Israeli state prosecutor Amit Aisman, in response to the International Court of Justice opening an investigation against Israel, considered charging Shitrit for incitement over this comment but decided against it.

Shitrit was appointed to the Knesset Special Committee for the Rights of the Child in August 2025, replacing Eliyahu Revivo.

Shitrit was not reelected during the 2026 Israeli legislative election.

Shitrit is married to Asher Shitrit. They have three children, and reside in Beit Shemesh. Her son Moshe is deputy mayor of the city.
