= Eliyahu Revivo =

Israeli politician (born 1973)

- אליהו רביבו
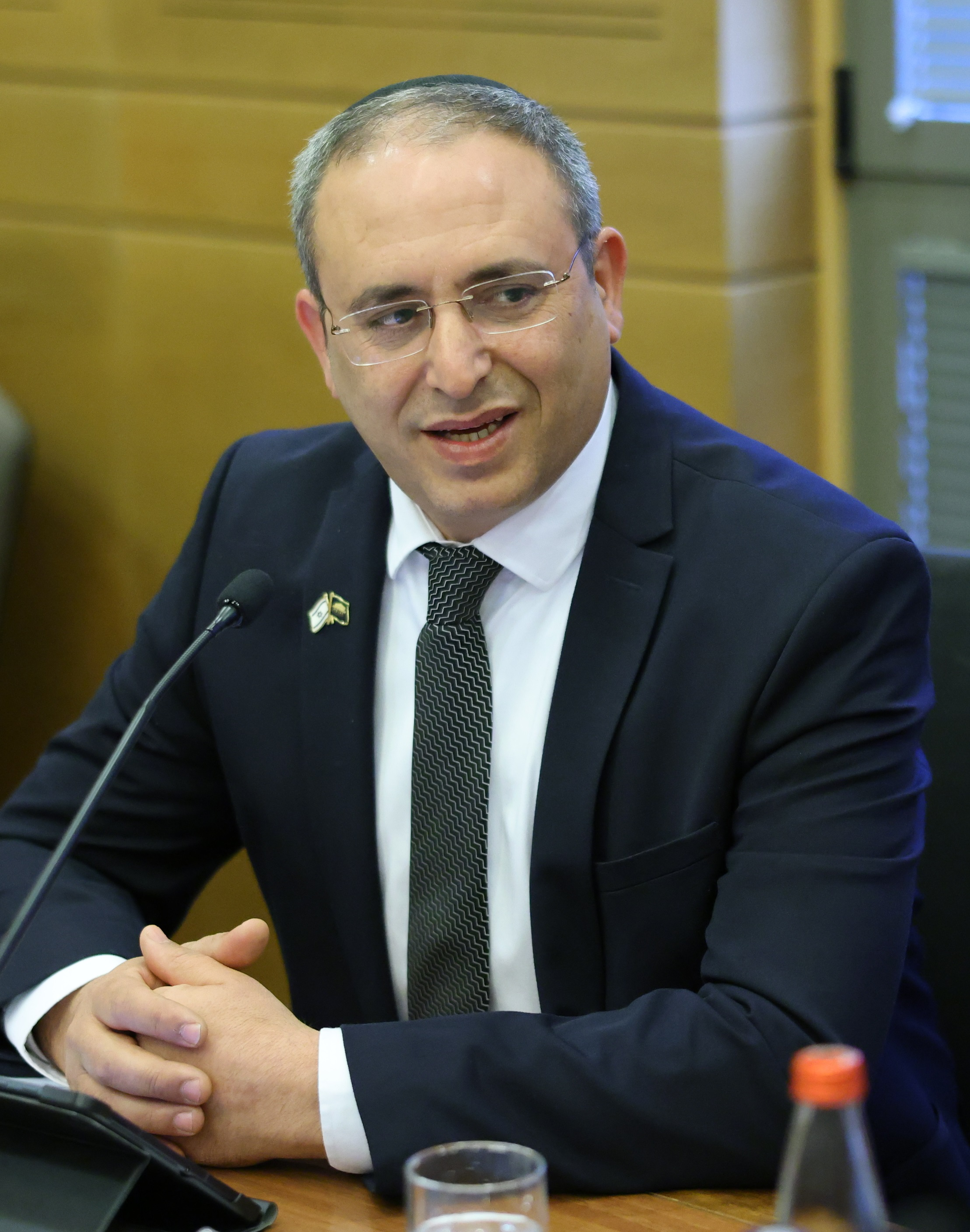

Faction represented in the Knesset
- 2022–2026: Likud

Personal details
- Born: 1973 (age 52–53) Lod, Israel

Eliyahu Revivo (Hebrew: אליהו רביבו; born 1973) is an Israeli politician and Likud activist who served as a member of the Knesset from 2022 until 2026.

== Biography ==
Revivo was born in 1973 to Yaakov and Esther. He has been an activist for the Likud party, since the 1996 election. Revivo also worked for the city of Lod until retiring due to his brother Yair being elected Mayor of Lod in 2013.

Revivo ran in a primary to represent the 19th spot on the Likud's 2022 electoral list, which the party reserves for a resident of the Shephelah. After receiving support from former mayor of Lod Pinhas Idan, Revivo won 48% of the vote, defeating Benjamin Netanyahu's former Chief of staff David Sharon and member of the Rehovot City Council Guy Tsur.

He served as the chair of the Knesset Special Committee for the Rights of the Child until August 2025, when he was replaced by Keti Shitrit.

== Personal life ==
Revivo resides in Gedera. He is married to Miri, and has three children.
