= Gila Gamliel =

Israeli politician (born 1974)

- Gamliel in 2019

Ministerial roles
- 2015–2020: Minister for Social Equality
- 2020–2021: Minister of Environmental Protection
- 2023–2024: Minister of Intelligence
- 2024–: Minister of Science & Technology

Faction represented in the Knesset
- 2003–2006: Likud
- 2009–: Likud

Personal details
- Born: 24 February 1974 (age 52) Gedera, Israel

Gila Gamliel-Demri (Hebrew: גִּלָּה גַּמְלִיאֵל-דִּמְרִי; born 24 February 1974) is an Israeli politician who currently serves as Minister of Science and Technology and as a member of the Knesset for Likud. She also previously served as Minister for Social Equality, Minister of Environmental Protection and Minister of Intelligence.

== Early life and education ==
Gamliel was born in Gedera. Her father Yosef Gameliel was born to a Yemenite Jewish family, and her mother Aliza was born to a Libyan Jewish family. Both her parents immigrated to Israel. After leaving school she did her national service in the Israel Defense Forces. She subsequently studied at the Ben-Gurion University of the Negev, where she was awarded a BA degree in Middle Eastern history and philosophy, and an MA degree in philosophy. During her time as a student she was elected chairwoman of the university's student union. She was controversially re-elected to the post after her boyfriend, Sagiv Assulin, had removed members who opposed Gamliel's candidacy from the association's steering council. She also served as the first woman chair of the National Union of Israeli Students, and later obtained a Bachelor of Laws at the Ono Academic College and a Master of Laws at the Bar-Ilan University.

== Career ==
Gamliel was placed 25th on the Likud list for the 1999 elections, but missed out on a place in the Knesset when the party won only 19 seats. In 2003 she surprisingly won 11th place on the Likud list for the elections that year, ahead of several cabinet ministers. She became a Knesset member when the party won 38 seats, standing down as head of the Ben-Gurion University students' union, where she was replaced by Assulin. Following her election to the Knesset, police decided to open an investigation into the suspected transfer of student funds into a private company. She was also accused of blackmailing a fellow student council member in order to retain the chairmanship of the students' association of the Ben-Gurion University of the Negev at the time. Gamliel denied both accusations. In November 2003, the fraud police decided to stop the investigations against her because of the lack of sufficient evidence.

In June 2003 she and three other Likud MKs were banned from the Likud faction for three months after voting against government economic policy. During her first term in the Knesset she chaired the Committee on the Status of Women, and in March 2005 was appointed Deputy Minister of Agriculture.

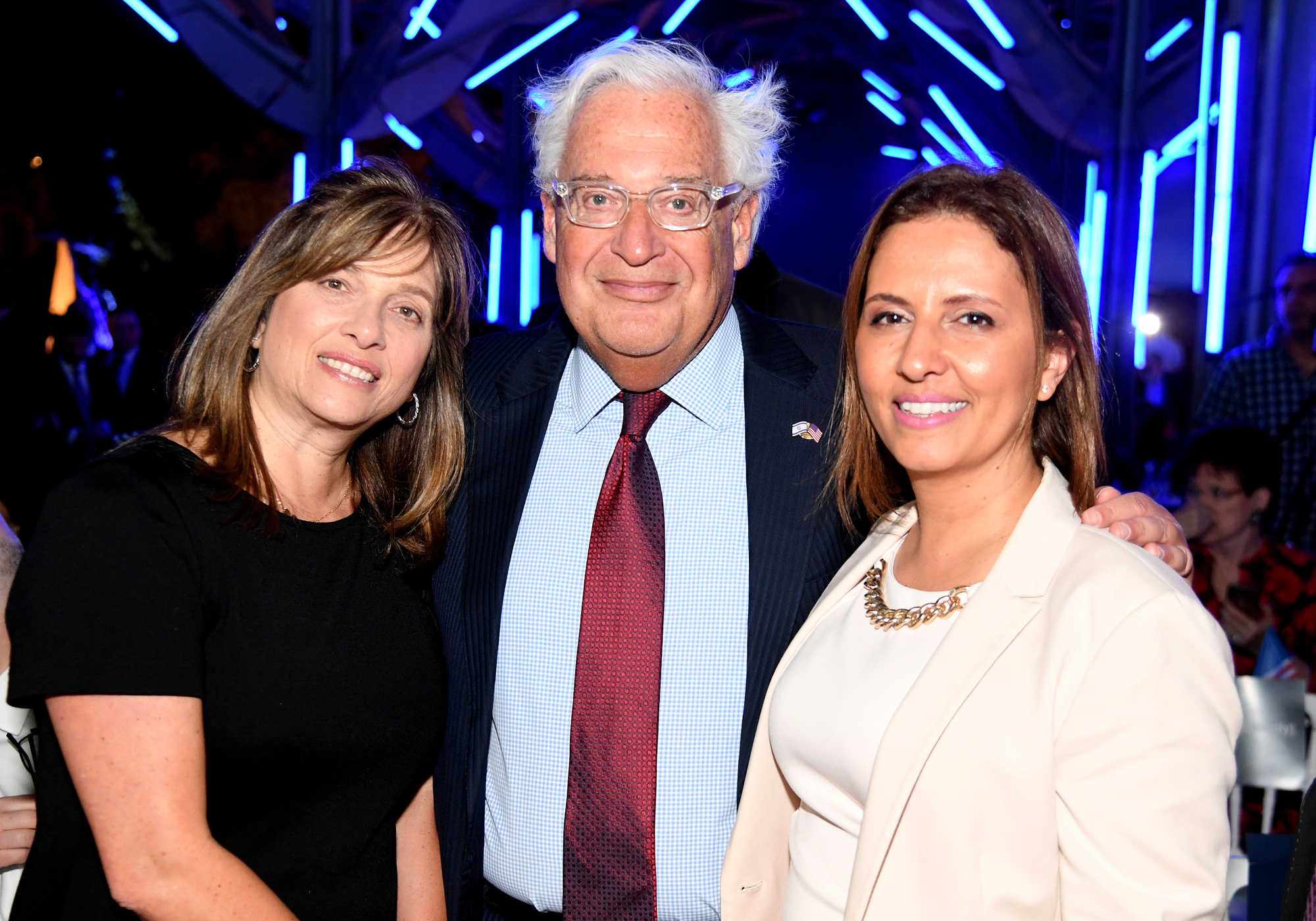
Gamliel (right) with U.S. Ambassador to Israel David M. Friedman, 27 June 2019

Gamliel was placed on the 38th spot on the Likud list for the 2006 elections and lost her seat. Prior to the 2009 elections she won nineteenth place on the party's list and returned to the Knesset as Likud won 27 seats. On 1 April 2009 Prime Minister Benjamin Netanyahu appointed Gamliel as Deputy Minister in the Prime Minister's Office in his new government, with the portfolio of the Advancement of Young People, Students and Women.

In the 2013 elections she was re-elected to the Knesset, but lost her Deputy Ministerial post. She was also re-elected in the 2015 elections, after which she was appointed Minister for Senior Citizens in the new government (renamed Minister for Social Equality in August 2015).

On 17 May 2020 Gamliel took up a different cabinet post when she was sworn in as Minister of Environmental Protection, which she held until 2021. On 2 January 2023 Gamliel became the Minister of Intelligence.

In 2023 Gamliel suggested the "voluntary resettlement of Palestinians in Gaza" is an option. It has been reported in the context of clandestine talks by some Israeli officials with Congolese counterparts with the goal of resettling Gazans to that African country, that she argued for their "humanitarian emigration", given the state of the Strip after the war.

In July 2025, she was appointed as a member of the Shikli Committee, formed in order to recommend the termination of Gali Baharav-Miara from the post of the Attorney General.

In August 2025 the Haaretz newspaper exposed that a network of Twitter accounts was coordinating the distribution of messages from Gamliel on the subject of Iran, with many of the accounts registered in Iran.

Gamliel's position on Likud's electoral list ahead of the 2026 Israeli legislative election dropped to the 35th slot following a recount several weeks after the 2026 Likud primary concluded.

== Personal life ==
Whilst at Ben-Gurion University Gamliel dated Sagiv Assulin, with whom she worked closely together in the students' association, with the couple becoming known as "Sagilon". Assulin was also on the Likud list for the 2009 elections, but in 35th place and he failed to win a seat. Gamliel is now married to Hovev Damari, with two daughters, and lives in Tel Aviv.

She has five elder siblings. Her father's family, the Gamliels, are a big family of Yemenite Jews in Gila's birthplace, Gedera. Her mother is a Libyan Jew, originating from Tripoli. Other family members of Gila are politicians as well: Her brother Chaim was chairman of Likud in Gedera; her brother Yoel Gamliel is mayor of Gedera; and another relative, Aryeh Gamliel, is a former member of the Knesset for Shas.

On 3 October 2020 Gamliel tested positive for COVID-19. Gamliel did not at first disclose to investigators from the Health Ministry that she traveled from her home in Tel Aviv to Tiberias for Yom Kippur during a national lockdown. She had instead told investigators from the Health Ministry that she caught COVID-19 from her driver. Upon the disclosure that Gamliel apparently violated the lockdown and was not forthcoming with health investigators, the Movement for Quality Government in Israel called for her to resign from the Knesset.
