= Hanoch Milwidsky =

Israeli politician

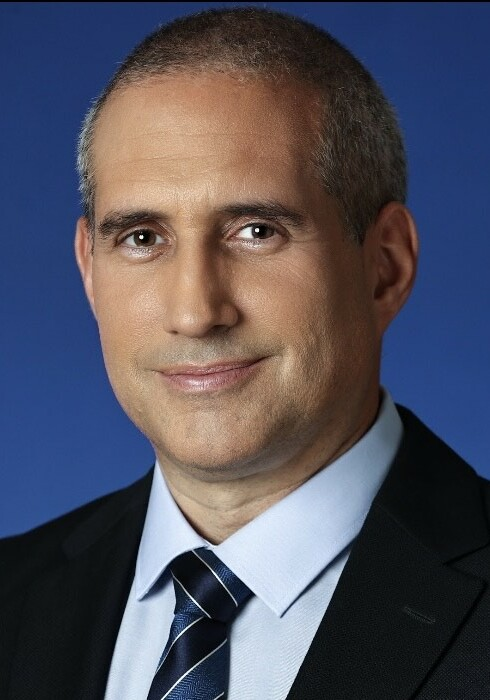
- Milwidsky in 2022

Faction represented in the Knesset
- 2022–2026: Likud

Personal details
- Born: 13 February 1973 (age 53) Jerusalem, Israel

Hanoch Dov Milwidsky (Hebrew: חנוך דב מילביצקי; born 13 February 1973) is an Israeli politician who served as a member of the Knesset for Likud from 2022 until 2026.

== Biography ==
Milwidsky was born in 1973 in Jerusalem. He earned an LLB at Reichman University and an MA in Jewish history at the University of Haifa. He worked as a legal advisor to the Bnei Baruch organisation.

In 2013 he was elected to Petah Tikva city council, going on to serve as deputy mayor. Previously a member of Yesh Atid, prior to the 2022 Knesset elections Milwidsky was placed twenty-sixth on the Likud list. He was elected to the Knesset as the party won 32 seats.

== Controversies ==
After the judicial reform attempt by the government and the mass reactions to it, followed by the 2023 Hamas-led attack on Israel and the ensuing Gaza war, Milwidsky made a number of controversial statements.

=== Comments on Jewish murderers ===
In January 2023, during a discussion in the Knesset over a proposed law which would strip Israeli citizenship from convicted terrorists who received stipends from the Palestinian Authority; Arab MK Ahmad Tibi criticized the proposal as discriminatory towards Israeli Arabs, and noted the law would not apply to Jewish Israelis convicted of murder. In response, Milwidsky said “I do not feel any need to justify myself for the fact that I, in the Jewish state, prefer Jews. Yes, Ahmad Tibi, [I prefer] Jewish murderers over Arab murderers. And as a general rule, I prefer Jews over disloyal Arabs.“

=== Comments on rape and torture ===
In July 2024, after far-right Hardal protestors, including several members of the Knesset, stormed the IDF's Sde Teiman detention camp and rioted at the Beit Lid base, the headquarters of Israel's military courts and military police, because the military police had detained nine soldiers investigated for sexual violence against a Palestinian detainee, Milwidsky announced a "voting strike" in the Knesset. During the debate Milwidsky was asked if it was legitimate for Israeli soldiers to rape Palestinians by inserting a stick into the victim's rectum. Milwidsky responded "Yes! If he is a Nukhba [member of the Hamas special unit which led the October 7 onslaught], everything is legitimate to do! Everything!"

=== Call to avoid secular court system ===
On 29 August 2024, while speaking with an ultra-Orthodox radio station, Milwidsky called on the public to stop cooperating with the court system, stating that

"The court is a place without justice. It's good to avoid arriving at the court. People should go to arbitration or rabbinical courts."

The head of the Israel Bar Association qualified this call as "complete societal disintegration and anarchy."

=== Sexual assault and obstruction of justice ===
In July 2025, he was questioned by Lahav 433 on suspicions of sexual assault and obstruction of justice. An unidentified woman has accused Milwidsky of raping her while he was serving as a legal adviser for Bnei Baruch, during meetings in which he was allegedly coaching her to testify falsely in a sexual assault case against the group's leader. Another woman accused Milwidsky of sexually assaulting her in an interview she gave to HaHadashot 12 in 2022.

In July 2025, when Moshe Gafni left the government and his position as chair of the Knesset Finance Committee became available, Netanyahu announced that Milwidsky would become the new chair; there was much objection amongst Likud MKs, as well as opposition MKs.
