= Moshe Saada =

Israeli politician

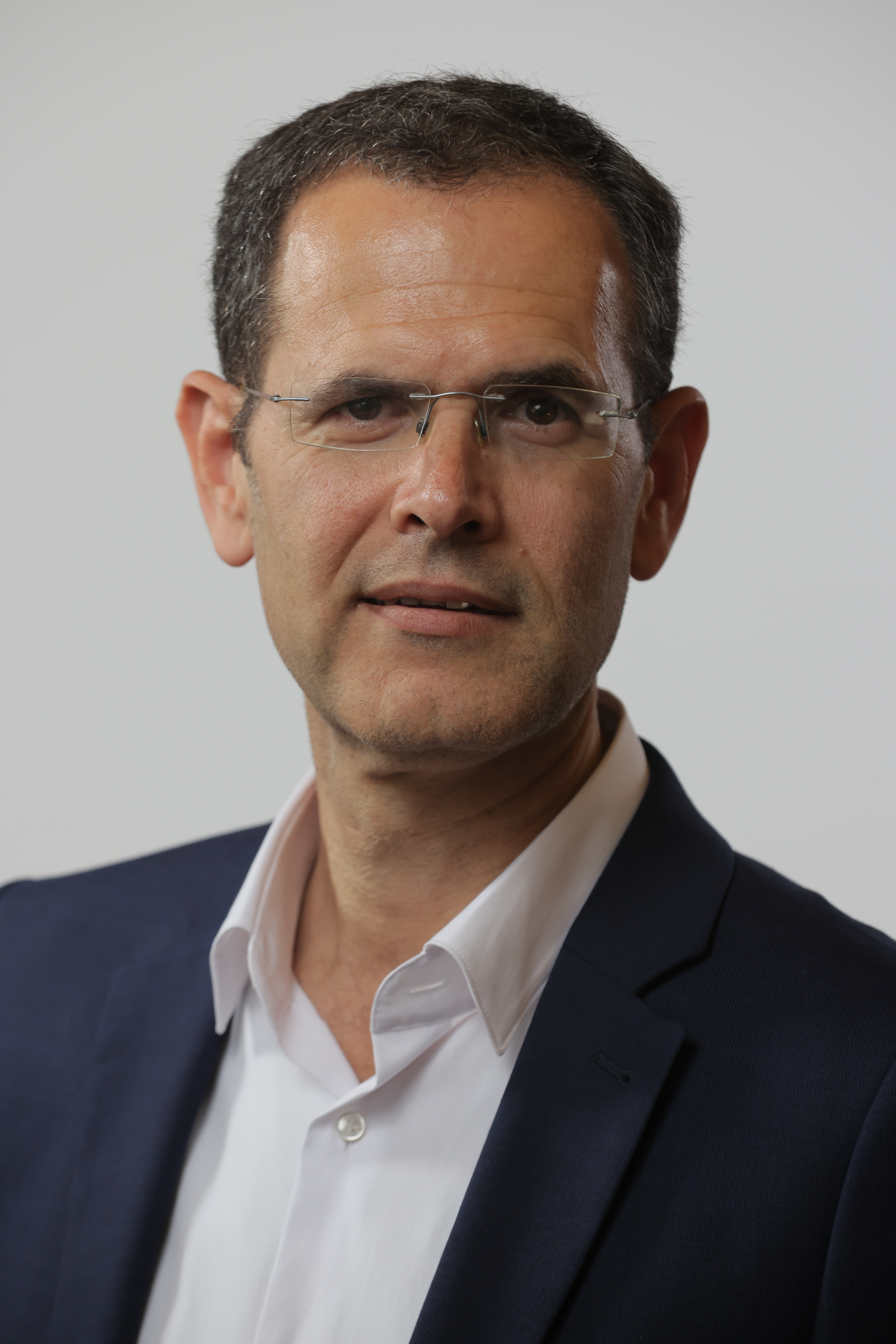
- Saada in 2022

Faction represented in the Knesset
- 2022–: Likud

Personal details
- Born: 14 September 1972 (age 54) Ramot Meir, Israel

Moshe Saada (Hebrew: משה סעדה; born 14 September 1972) is an Israeli politician who currently serves as a member of the Knesset for Likud.

== Biography ==
Saada worked for the Israeli Ministry of Justice as deputy head of the Police Internal Investigations Department.

Prior to the 2022 Knesset elections, Saada was placed twenty-eighth on the Likud list. He was elected to the Knesset as the party won 32 seats.

Saada, as a member of the State Control Committee, voted in October 2025 against the creation of a commission of inquiry on the 7 October attacks.

He was re-elected to the Knesset in the 2026 Israeli legislative election after being placed seventeenth on the party's list.

== Political positions ==
In January 2024, Saada appeared to endorse the total destruction of Gaza in an interview on Channel 14. Saada said that "My friends at the prosecutor's office, who fought with me on political matters, in debates, tell me, 'Moshe, it is clear that all the Gazans need to be destroyed,' and these are statements I have never heard." Saada said the popularity of such statements in the aftermath of the October 7 attacks was proof the Israeli right-wing was correct about the Palestinians. Saada said in an interview in April 2024, "Yes, I will starve the residents of Gaza, yes, that is our obligation."
