= Erez Tadmor (politician) =

Israeli writer and politician (born 1980)

- ארז תדמור

Personal details
- Born: 14 August 1980 (age 46)
- Education: Hebrew University of Jerusalem, Bar-Ilan University

Erez Tadmor (born 14 August 1980) is an Israeli columnist, radio broadcaster and politician, and a member of the Knesset for Likud. Tadmor is a founder of Im Tirtzu, and was Benjamin Netanyahu's speechwriter in the 2015 Knesset election. He is additionally the author of several books, including Why do you vote right and get left?, published by Sela Meir in 2017, and "Nakba Harta", published in 2011. Tadmor also has a weekly strip at the Radio Station Galei Yisrael.

== Biography ==
Tadmor grew up in Kiryat Arba in a Secular Jewish family and studied at Beit Hinuch High School in Jerusalem. He served his draft in the Israel Defense Forces as a member of the Israeli Combat Engineering Corps.

During his military service, while commanding a training platoon, Tadmor was convicted of stealing IDF Weapons and Property and sentenced to 48 days of imprisonment, 4 months of parole and demotion to Corporal.

In 2002, Tadmor helped found Israeli outpost Sde Boaz.

Tadmor worked as a reporter for Yedioth Jerusalem (2003–2004), Makor Rishon (2004–2006), and later for Nrg. In 2006, Tadmor began studying for a bachelor's degree in Poltiical Science at the Hebrew University of Jerusalem, later completing a master's degree in the subject at Bar-Ilan University.

Tadmor worked In Likud's Jerusalem campaign office during the 2006 Knesset election. In January 2007, he established the Im Tirtzu movement alongside Ronen Shoval. In 2011, Tadmor co-wrote the 73-page booklet "Nakba Harta" with Erel Segal, which was published by Im Tirtzu and argued the Nakba was a Palestinian myth created to provide an image of Palestinian victimhood. Tadmor then left Im Tirtzu in 2012. He subsequently joined the online Magazine Mida and briefly served as an editor at Nrg.

In 2014, Tadmor began writing the book "Why do you vote right and get left?", as his final assignment in a Tikvah Fund seminar. The book was published in 2017. A review by Yariv Oppenheimer describes the book as an in-depth analysis of the ability of "leftist elites" to force their views upon the majority of the Israeli public. The book argues Menachem Begin's 1977 election victory, nicknamed the "Mahapach", entrenched the control of elites over the Israeli Bueraucracy. In April 2016, Tadmor received a daily radio strip in Galei Yisrael, replacing Erel Segal.

Tadmorm, sought election to the Knesset as a member of Likud in the April 2019 Israeli legislative election, and was assigned the 41st slot on the party's list (later bumped to 40) by party leader Benjamin Netanyahu. He was not elected as the party won 41 seats. In the 2022 election he sought nomination through Likud's internal primaries, and was elected to the 47th slot on the party list. He was not elected as the party won 32 seats.

Ahead of the 2026 election, Tadmor sought nomination in Likud a second time, this time as the regional representative for Jerusalem, Judea and Samaria and the Shephelah. He was elected to the 27th slot on the party list, and subsequently elected to the Knesset as Likud won 27 seats.

== Views ==
Tadmor believes the Supreme Court of Israel rules on political rather than legal grounds, thus creating a "Judicial Dictatorship" working against the will of voters, especially regarding the Demolition of homes belonging to Terrorists.

Tadmor has also expressed support for Economic Liberalism and opposition to a Planned economy.

== Books ==
- Why do you vote right and get left?, Sela Meir, 2017
- The Generals' Rebellion, Sela Meir, 2026

== Personal life ==
Tadmor is married and has three children. He has resided in Efrat since 2007.
