= Almog Cohen (politician) =

Israeli politician (born 1988)

- אלמוג כהן
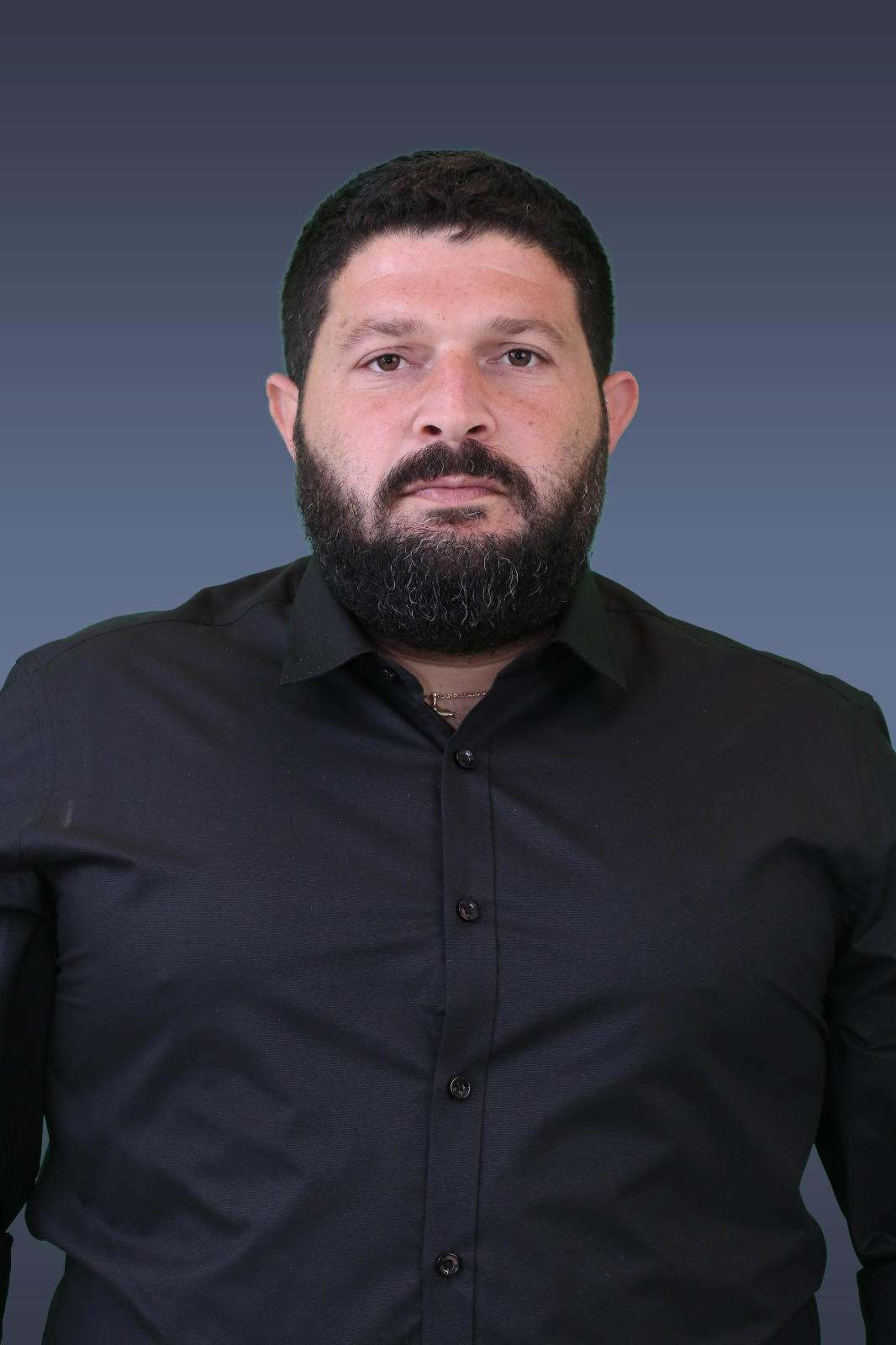
- Cohen in 2022

Ministerial roles
- 2025–: Deputy Minister in the Prime Minister's Office

Faction represented in the Knesset
- 2022–2025: Otzma Yehudit
- 2026-: Likud

Personal details
- Born: 12 January 1988 (age 38) Beersheba, Israel
- Party: Likud (since 2026)
- Other political affiliations: Otzma Yehudit (2021–2026)
- Spouse: Gali Cohen
- Children: 3
- Occupation: Police officer; Businessman; Politician

Almog Cohen (Hebrew: אלמוג כהן; born 12 January 1988) is an Israeli politician, former police officer, and militia founder. He served as a member of the Knesset for the Israeli far-right party Otzma Yehudit from 2022 until 2025. He has served as a regional coordinator for the party. Owing to his police background, Cohen acquired nicknames including "the sheriff" and "the warrior from the Negev" within the party. In August 2026 he joined Likud, becoming an MK for the party in that year's legislative election.

Prior to his political career, Cohen organized a militia force in the Negev region, which was created to "fight crime among Bedouins." Ahead of the 2022 Israeli legislative election, Cohen removed wide traces of his digital footprint, including calls to "wash the streets of Gaza with blood". In 2022, he claimed that the alleged 2021 rape by a Negev Bedouin of a 10-year-old Jewish girl in her home is what made him become an activist.

After entering the Knesset following the 2022 election, Cohen briefly served on the Knesset's Foreign Affairs and Defense Committee before being removed by party leader Itamar Ben-Gvir over insubordination. In January 2023, Cohen was suspended from Twitter for his calls to "keep killing them" following a raid in the Jenin refugee camp that led to the deaths of nine Palestinians. In February 2023, Cohen broadcast a rant in the Knesset in which he compared Arab MKs to animals; he was subsequently reprimanded by the Knesset's ethics panel.

== Early life and education ==
Cohen was born in Be'er-Sheva, to a father of Iranian-Jewish descent and a mother of Tunisian-Jewish descent. He currently lives in Ofakim. Cohen is a graduate of the Afiki Eretz yeshiva of Bnei Akiva in Ofakim. His grandfather, Rabbi Eliyahu Hadad, was a rabbi in Tunis. During his time in the Israel Defense Forces (IDF), he served in the Target Intelligence Unit.

== Police and militia career ==
Cohen worked as a police officer for 11 years. After retiring from the police, Cohen opened Pancake House, a restaurant in Be'er-Sheva. Cohen stated that after opening the restaurant in 2018, the Bedouin threatened his personal safety.

Cohen is the leader of the Negev Rescue Committee, established to fight crime in the Negev. Cohen endorsed an operation in the Naqab called “Crystal Night". However, in response to public backlash, the police withdrew their endorsement of the group.

Cohen participated in repelling the 2023 Hamas attack on Israel. In 2022, a Negev Bedouin family called for the re-opening of a police brutality accusation against Cohen for violently assaulting them in 2013. Three family members claimed that Cohen kicked them in the groin, urinated on their faces, and threatened them with "a bullet to the head". The men stated they were able to identify Cohen owing to a social media post in which he posted a photo of himself kneeling over them.

== Political career ==
Cohen became a regional coordinator for Otzma Yehudit.

=== Knesset tenure ===
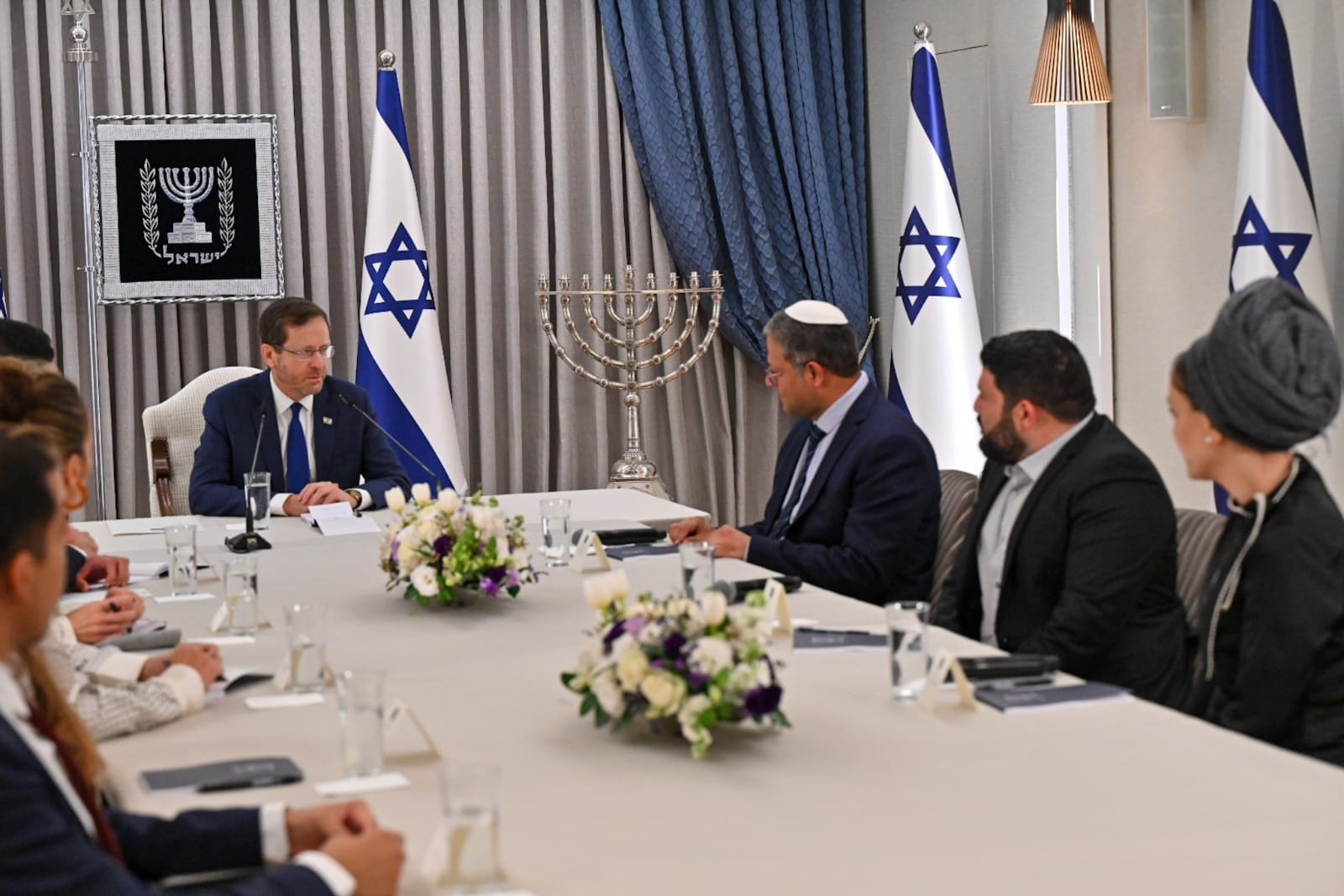
Cohen (second from right) joins other members of the Otzma Yehudit faction to meet President Isaac Herzog

Ahead of the 2022 Israeli legislative elections, he was placed seventh on the list led by Otzma Yehudit and the Religious Zionist Party. He was successfully elected an MK after the list won 14 seats.

Following his election to the Knesset in 2022, Cohen suggested in an interview that Yair Lapid deserved to be thrown in prison.

Shortly after taking office, Cohen introduced legislation in the Knesset to bar NGOs from receiving donations from organizations who are funded by countries that do not recognize Israel's sovereignty. Cohen has endorsed a blanket ban on the use of TikTok in East Jerusalem, calling the platform “a crazy incitement zone that is creating the next terrorist.”

In February 2023, Cohen confronted protestors at Tel Aviv University opposing the January 2023 Jenin incursion. During the confrontation, Cohen attempted to grab a Palestinian flag from one of the protestors. Cohen co-sponsored legislation in 2023 to make flying an enemy flag a criminal offense punishable by a year in jail.

In June 2023, Cohen was removed from the Knesset's Foreign Affairs and Defense Committee by party leader Itamar Ben-Gvir, with fellow Otzma Yehudit MK Limor Son Har-Melech taking his place. Cohen had reportedly had a falling-out with Ben-Gvir the prior month over his criticism of an ultimatum made by the party leader regarding the national budget. Ben-Gvir had threatened the government's budget plans if they did not allocate increased funds for the Ministry for the Development of the Negev and the Galilee. Cohen broke with Ben-Gvir by indicating he would vote for the budget agreement regardless.

=== Government tenure ===
Cohen was expected to resign his position in April 2025 and become a deputy minister, which would enable former MK Zvi Sukkot to return to the Knesset. Cohen resigned on 6 April.

He announced on 29 June that he would resign from the government and return to the Knesset, but he withdrew the resignation.

=== Likud ===
Cohen was granted an exemption to Likud's seniority rules by Prime Minister Benjamin Netanyahu in August 2026, allowing him to run in the party's primary. Cohen confirmed on 12 August that he would run in the primary.

== Views and opinions ==
Cohen has been described as a far-right politician by The New York Times. Prior to his election to the Knesset, Cohen expressed several extremist views on social media. In a deleted post, Cohen called for soldiers and policemen to kill, instead of arrest, Palestinian suspects, and called "to wash the streets of Gaza with blood".

Cohen has referred to Palestinian villages in the West Bank as "Palestinazi villages", and accused Palestinians of supporting a Nazi ideology. In 2023, Cohen claimed that "Palestinians are engaging in Nazism, in murdering Jews. There is a Nazi culture there". While Cohen conceded that he does not believe all Palestinians are Nazis, he alleged that social media platform TikTok was being used to spread Nazi ideology among Palestinians. He called for the killing of Palestinians during Ramadan.

In 2022, Almog Cohen expressed support for the Russian all-out invasion of Ukraine. Cohen slammed U.S. President Joe Biden after he characterized the current government as "extreme", claiming that Biden was uninformed about Israel.

In since-deleted posts, Cohen expressed strong opposition to pride parades, stating that "the pride parade is a completely animalistic parade of unbridled and unrestrained sex partying, while harassing boys and minors". He added that he considers pride parades to be "a shocking spectacle of hard and sick porn".

In January 2023, Twitter suspended Cohen's account following a tweet expressing support for the actions of the Israeli Defense Forces (IDF) during the January 2023 Jenin incursion that resulted in the deaths of nine Palestinians.

Cohen praised the IDF, stating "Good and professional work by the fighters in Jenin, keep killing them" and criticized Twitter's decision, calling it "the worst kind of censorship". He claimed that his intention was to target "terrorists involved and not bystanders".

In February 2023, Cohen was criticized for comparing Arab MKs to animals. Cohen explicitly stated that MKs from the predominantly Arab Hadash–Ta'al alliance were "not worthy of being sheep, they’re not humans", and vowed to make "their lives miserable". The Times of Israel reported that Cohen was filmed "making animal calling sounds" to draw the attention of Ofer Cassif, the sole Jewish MP in the Hadash–Ta'al alliance.

Cohen refused to apologize for his rant, stating that his "goal is to make them feel uncomfortable" and that he considered them supporters of terrorism. In March 2023, he was formally reprimanded for his comments by the Knesset's ethics committee, which led him to lose some parliamentary rights for two days.

== Personal life ==
Cohen is married, with three children.
