= Amit Halevi =

Israeli rabbi and politician (born 1971)

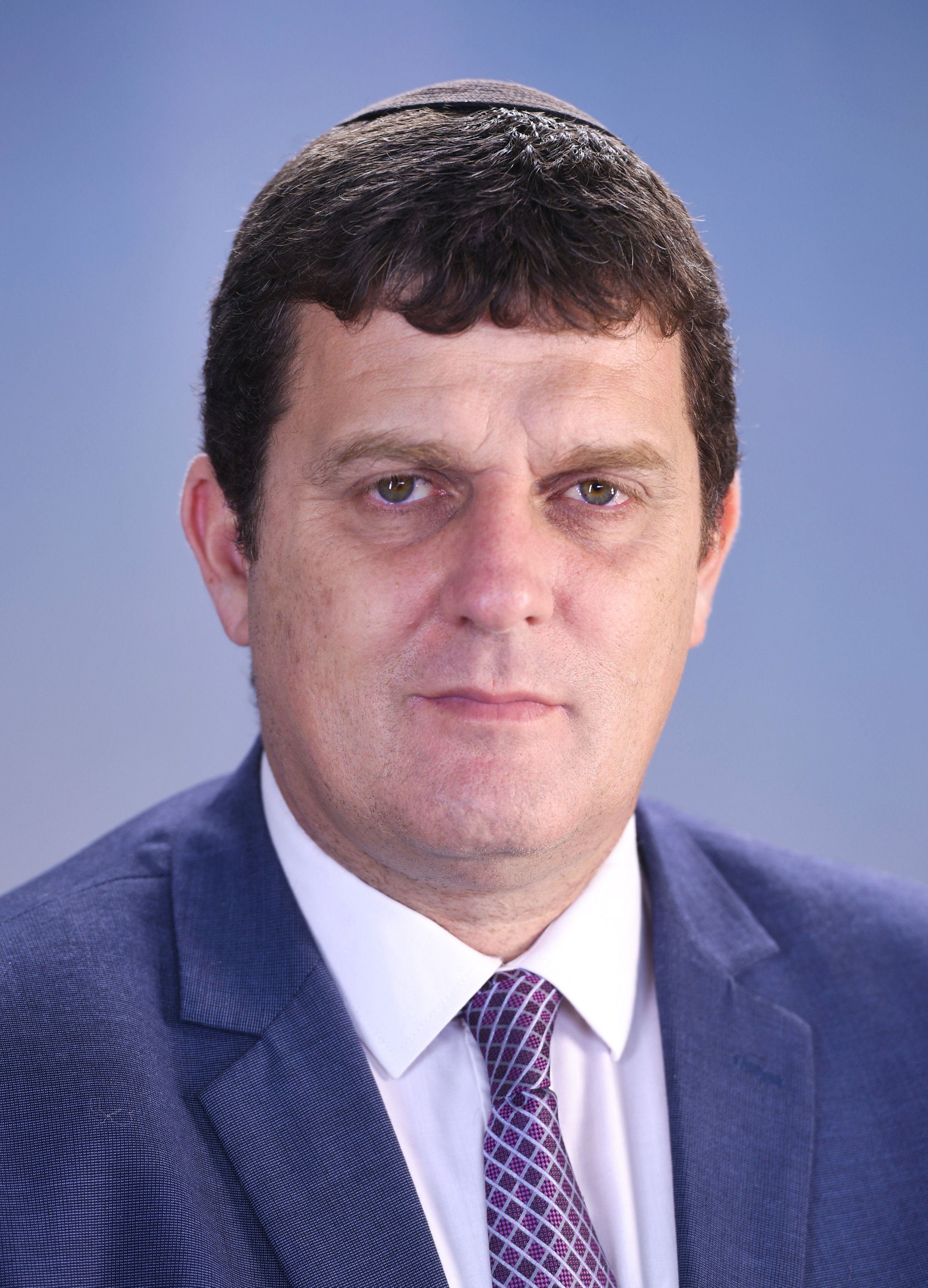
- Halevi in 2021

Faction represented in the Knesset
- 2020–2021: Likud
- 2023–2026: Likud

Personal details
- Born: 5 June 1971 (age 55) Haifa, Israel

Amit Halevi (Hebrew: עמית הלוי; born 5 June 1971) is an Israeli politician who served as a member of the Knesset for Likud from 2023 until 2026, an office he previously held from 2020 to 2021.

== Biography ==
Halevi was born in Haifa in 1971 and was educated at Yavneh High School in Haifa and the Mercaz HaRav yeshiva in Jerusalem. During his service in the Israel Defense Forces, he served in the 7th Armored Brigade (Israel). He graduated from the School of Public Policy at the Hebrew University of Jerusalem and later jointly established the Jewish Statesmanship Center with Assaf Malakh.

He was placed thirty-sixth on the Likud list for the April 2019 elections, but the party won only 35 seats. He was placed thirty-ninth for the September 2019 elections, in which Likud won 32 seats. Although he missed out again in the March 2020 elections in which he was placed thirty-ninth and Likud won 36 seats, he entered the Knesset on 30 July 2020 as a replacement for Amir Ohana, who had resigned his seat under the Norwegian Law after being appointed to the cabinet. Placed thirty-fifth on the Likud list for the 2021 elections, he lost his seat as the party won 30 seats. Halevi returned to the Knesset on 17 January 2023 as a replacement for Amichai Chikli, following his resignation under the Norwegian Law.

He was removed from the Knesset's Foreign Affairs and Defense Committee in May 2025 after voting against a bill that extended IDF "reservist call-ups" and was replaced by coalition whip Ofir Katz.

Halevi is an Orthodox Jew. He is married to Irit Halevi, has six children, and lives in Jerusalem.

== Views ==
In June 2023 he proposed a bill to divide the Temple Mount, also known as the al-Aqsa mosque compound, between Jews and Muslims, generating criticism from Palestinian Prime Minister Mohammed Shtayyeh.

On July 7 2024, Halevi appeared in an interview on Kan 11 stating "In the orthopedic department of Al-Shifa Hospital, they found 150 terrorists and then killed them. At the same time, 300 terrorists were born in the maternity ward. 300!" After Bert-Jan Ruissen invited Halevi to a European Parliament panel on Iran, 36 members of the European Parliament called for Halevi to be blocked from Parliament for his implying Palestinian babies would become terrorists, as well as his claim that “There is nothing called Palestinian people, never was, and will never be.” Regarding the Gaza War, Halevi wrote on Facebook that “There are only two types of Palestinians: Palestinians who support Hamas's Nazi education and Palestinians who serve as human shields for them. We can and must bomb both.”

In January 2025 he was one of eight members of the Foreign Affairs and Defense Committee to call on Defense Minister Israel Katz to order the IDF to destroy all water, food and energy sources in the Gaza Strip in order to achieve the war aims.

In February 2025, he introduced a bill, passed by the Knesset, providing for five years' imprisonment for any Israeli cooperating with the International Criminal Court.

In March 2025, Halevi suggested that Israel should occupy and cleanse Gaza, stating "We want to occupy the territory in order to cleanse it of the enemy; otherwise, he will kill your children and kidnap your grandchildren again."

In May 2025, during a Knesset discussion on the Gaza humanitarian crisis, when an Israeli doctor assumed that the Knesset supported suffering children in Gaza receiving "painkillers or minimal medical treatment", Halevi disagreed, saying: "I'm not sure you're speaking for us when you say we want to treat every child and every woman. I hope you don't stand behind that statement either. When fighting a group like this, the distinctions that exist in a normal world don't exist." When a statistician told the Knesset that he calculated from Israeli Defense Forces data that "we are already at a point where tens of thousands [in Gaza] have no food at all or have less than 300 calories a day", Halevi responded: "There is no hungry person in Gaza, not even a single child. It's a shame you are amplifying that lie – no one is lacking anything"; however as the discussion continued, the Israeli Defense Forces raised the possibility that there may be "pockets of hunger" in Gaza.
