= David Bitan =

Israeli lawyer and politician (born 1960)

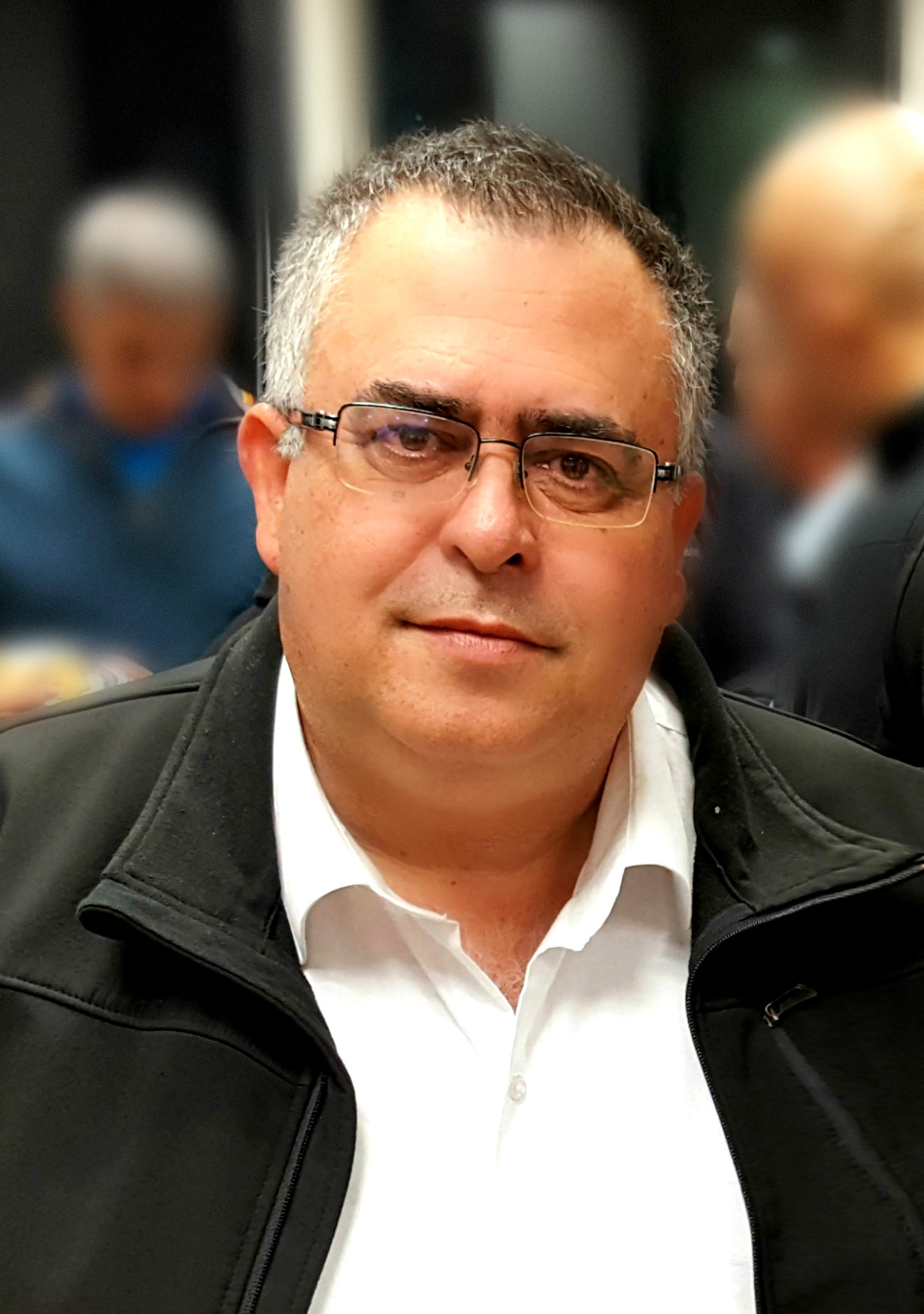
- Bitan in 2016

Faction represented in the Knesset
- 2015–: Likud

Personal details
- Born: 8 April 1960 (age 66) Kenitra, Morocco

David Hai Bitan (Hebrew: דָּוִד בִּיטָן; born 8 April 1960) is an Israeli lawyer and politician. He currently serves as a member of the Knesset from the Likud party. During 2016 and 2017 he served as the Chairman of the Coalition and Chairman of the Likud party in the Knesset, and in the 23rd Knesset served as Chairman of the Immigration and Absorption Committee. Israeli attorney general Avichai Mandelblit announced on 26 January 2020 that Bitan would be indicted for "bribery, fraud and breach of trust, as well as money laundering and tax offenses" following a hearing.

== Early and personal life ==
Bitan was born in Kenitra in Morocco. His family immigrated to Israel when he was five. During his national service in the Israel Defense Forces he served as a combat medic. He then studied law at the Tel Aviv University. After graduating with an L.L.B in 1987 and receiving a law license, he worked as an attorney and later opened his own law firm.

Bitan is married to Hagit and they have two daughters.

== Political career ==
A member of the Likud party, he became a member of the Rishon LeZion City Council in 1988 after becoming head of the party's Rishon LeZion branch. He went on to become Deputy Mayor of the city.

In 2010 Bitan was investigated for suspicion of ethical and integrity violations. Following the allegations, Bitan waived some of his responsibilities relating to construction within the municipality. He was later given responsibilities in the areas of transportation, culture and housing. Following the 2013 municipal elections, he was given back the responsibilities for engineering, along with chairmanship of the municipal sub committee for planning and construction.

Bitan is a member of the board of trustees of the Jewish Agency for Israel from 2011.

He was placed 21st on the Likud list for the 2013 Knesset elections, but was moved down to 35th place after Likud agreed to run a joint list with Yisrael Beiteinu. With the alliance winning 31 seats, Bitan did not become a Knesset member. Prior to the 2015 elections he was placed 16th on the Likud list, taking the place reserved for the coastal plain. He was elected to the Knesset as the Likud won 30 seats and was sworn in as a Knesset member on 31 March 2015. He was appointed as chairman of the Knesset committee and in May 2016 he became Chairman of the coalition.

In October 2017 Bitan was investigated by police for alleged bribery. He was suspected of received money from businessmen to pay off a massive debt while Deputy Mayor of Rishon LeZion. On 7 March 2019, the Israeli police recommended bribery charges against Bitan.

He was placed 23rd on the Likud party list for the 21st Knesset and maintained the same place for the 22nd Knesset elections. He was appointed as deputy chairman of the Knesset.

He was nominated to be Minister of Agriculture on 5 January 2020, but withdrew on 10 January prior to a Knesset vote on his appointment.

In May 2020 he was appointed as Chairman of the Immigration and Absorption committee.

On 2 October 2023 Bitan visited Riyadh, Saudi Arabia among a 14-member delegation to attend the Universal Postal Union's extraordinary congress.

In the elections for the leadership of the world Likud held in July 2025, Bitan won first place among voters in Israel.

== Criminal indictment ==
On 6 July 2021 Bitan was indicted by Attorney General Avichai Mandelblit for seven counts of bribery, money laundering, fraud, breach of trust and tax offenses totaling NIS 715,000. In 2022 Lea Sonik-Kuperli, a businesswoman and real estate asset manager, was sentenced to seven and a half months in prison after being convicted of bribing Bitan. According to the indictment, Sonik-Kuperli asked Bitan, who served as chairman of the Subcommittee for Licensing and Planning of the Rishon LeZion Local Committee, to assist in promoting her company's interests related to the arrangement of exceptional usage of public parking lots near the network branches in the city and the payment of betterment levy. In exchange for Bitan's assistance, Sonik-Kuperli complied with his request and provided him with NIS 40,000 through an intermediary connected to Bitan, in the form of checks made payable to the "Ping Pong Rishon LeZion School for Mini-Football and Soccer" association. Bitan was accused of receiving the benefits through an associate who provided the checks to the ping pong association and received cash in return. In September 2022, as part of a plea agreement, Lihi Sonek-Kuperli were convicted of bribing Bitan. On December 27, 2022, the evidentiary phase of Bitan's trial began in the Lod District Court.
