= Party lists for the 2020 Israeli legislative election =

The 2020 Israeli legislative election was held using closed list proportional representation. Each party presented a list of candidates to the Central Elections Committee prior to the election.

== Blue and White ==
The Blue and White list was headed by Benny Gantz.

1. Benny Gantz (Resilience)
2. Yair Lapid (Yesh Atid)
3. Moshe Ya'alon (Telem)
4. Gabi Ashkenazi (Independent)
5. Avi Nissenkorn (Resilience)
6. Meir Cohen (Yesh Atid)
7. Miki Haimovich (Resilience)
8. Ofer Shelah (Yesh Atid)
9. Yoaz Hendel (Telem)
10. Orna Barbivai (Yesh Atid)
11. Michael Biton (Resilience)
12. Hili Tropper (Resilience)
13. Yael German (Yesh Atid)
14. Zvi Hauser (Telem)
15. Orit Farkash-Hacohen (Resilience)
16. Karin Elharar (Yesh Atid)
17. Meirav Cohen (Resilience)
18. Yoel Razvozov (Yesh Atid)
19. Asaf Zamir (Resilience)
20. Yizhar Shai (Resilience)
21. Elazar Stern (Yesh Atid)
22. Mickey Levy (Yesh Atid)
23. Omer Yankelevich (Resilience)
24. Pnina Tamano-Shata (Yesh Atid)
25. Gadeer Mreeh (Resilience)
26. Ram Ben-Barak (Yesh Atid)
27. Alon Schuster (Resilience)
28. Yoav Segalovitz (Yesh Atid)
29. Ram Shefa (Resilience)
30. Boaz Toporovsky (Yesh Atid)
31. Orly Fruman (Telem)
32. Eitan Ginzburg (Resilience)
33. Andrey Kozhinov (Telem)
34. Idan Roll (Yesh Atid)
35. Yorai Lahav-Hertzanu (Yesh Atid)
36. Michal Cotler-Wunsh (Telem)
37. Einav Kabla (Resilience)
38. Tehila Friedman (Yesh Atid)
39. Hila Vazan (Resilience)
40. Yael Ron Ben-Moshe (Resilience)
41. Vladimir Beliak (Yesh Atid)
42. Moshe Tur-Paz (Yesh Atid)
43. Ruth Wasserman Lande (Resilience)
44. Anat Knafo (Yesh Atid)

== Joint List ==
The Joint List list is headed by Ayman Odeh.

1. Ayman Odeh (Hadash)
2. Mtanes Shehadeh (Balad)
3. Ahmad Tibi (Ta'al)
4. Mansour Abbas (Ra'am)
5. Aida Touma-Suleiman (Hadash)
6. Walid Taha (Ra'am)
7. Ofer Cassif (Hadash)
8. Heba Yazbak (Balad)
9. Osama Saadi (Ta'al)
10. Yousef Jabareen (Hadash)
11. Said al-Harumi (Ra'am)
12. Jabar Asakla (Hadash)
13. Sami Abu Shehadeh (Balad)
14. Sondos Saleh (Ta'al)
15. Iman Khatib-Yasin (Ra'am)
16. Youssef Atauna (Hadash)

== Labor-Gesher-Meretz ==
The Labor-Gesher-Meretz list is headed by Amir Peretz.

1. Amir Peretz (Labor)
2. Orly Levy (Gesher)
3. Nitzan Horowitz (Meretz)
4. Tamar Zandberg (Meretz)
5. Itzik Shmuli (Labor)
6. Merav Michaeli (Labor)
7. Yair Golan (Meretz)
8. Ilan Gilon (Meretz)
9. Omer Bar-Lev (Labor)
10. Revital Swid (Labor)
11. Issawi Frej (Meretz)
12. Haggai Reznik (Gesher)
13. Eran Hermoni (Labor)
14. Mossi Raz (Meretz)
15. Emilie Moatti (Labor)

== Likud ==
The Likud list is headed by Benjamin Netanyahu.

1. Benjamin Netanyahu
2. Yuli Edelstein
3. Israel Katz
4. Gilad Erdan
5. Gideon Sa'ar
6. Miri Regev
7. Yariv Levin
8. Yoav Gallant
9. Nir Barkat
10. Gila Gamliel
11. Avi Dichter
12. Ze'ev Elkin
13. Haim Katz
14. Eli Cohen
15. Tzachi Hanegbi
16. Ofir Akunis
17. Yuval Steinitz
18. Tzipi Hotovely
19. Dudi Amsalem
20. Gadi Yevarkan
21. Amir Ohana
22. Ofir Katz
23. Eti Atiya
24. Yoav Kisch
25. David Bitan
26. Keren Barak
27. Shlomo Karhi
28. Miki Zohar
29. Yifat Shasha-Biton
30. Sharren Haskel
31. Michal Shir
32. Keti Shitrit
33. Fateen Mulla
34. May Golan
35. Tali Ploskov
36. Uzi Dayan
37. Ariel Kallner
38. Osnat Mark
39. Amit Halevi
40. Nissim Vaturi
41. Shevah Stern
42. Ayoob Kara
43. Matti Yogev
44. Yehuda Glick
45. Nurit Koren

== Shas ==
The Shas list is headed by Aryeh Deri.

1. Aryeh Deri
2. Yitzhak Cohen
3. Meshulam Nahari
4. Ya'akov Margi
5. Yoav Ben-Tzur
6. Michael Malchieli
7. Moshe Arbel
8. Yinon Azulai
9. Moshe Abutbul
10. Uriel Buso

== United Torah Judaism ==
The United Torah Judaism list is headed by Yaakov Litzman.

1. Yaakov Litzman (Agudat Yisrael)
2. Moshe Gafni (Degel HaTorah)
3. Meir Porush (Agudat Yisrael)
4. Uri Maklev (Degel HaTorah)
5. Ya'akov Tessler (Agudat Yisrael)
6. Ya'akov Asher (Degel HaTorah)
7. Yisrael Eichler (Agudat Yisrael)
8. Yitzhak Pindros (Degel HaTorah)
9. Eliyahu Hasid (Agudat Yisrael)
10. Eliyahu Baruchi (Degel HaTorah)

== Yamina ==
The Yamina list is headed by Naftali Bennett.

1. Naftali Bennett (New Right)
2. Rafi Peretz (The Jewish Home)
3. Ayelet Shaked (New Right)
4. Bezalel Smotrich (National Union)
5. Matan Kahana (New Right)
6. Ofir Sofer (National Union)
7. Idit Silman (New Right)
8. Sara Beck (Ahi)
9. Shirly Pinto (New Right)
10. Orit Strook (National Union)
11. Moti Yogev (The Jewish Home)
12. Shuli Mualem (New Right)
13. Yossi Cohen (The Jewish Home)
14. Shai Maimon (New Right)
15. Eli Ben-Dahan (The Jewish Home)
16. Ronnie Sassover (New Right)
17. Yomtob Kalfon (New Right)

== Yisrael Beiteinu ==
The Yisrael Beiteinu list is headed by Avigdor Lieberman.

1. Avigdor Lieberman
2. Oded Forer
3. Evgeny Sova
4. Eli Avidar
5. Yulia Malinovsky
6. Hamad Amar
7. Alex Kushnir
8. Mark Ifraimov
9. Limor Magen Telem
10. Elina Bardach-Yalov
11. Shadi Halul
12. Alex Fridman
13. David Davidyan
14. Shahar Alon
15. Olivier Rafowicz

== Minor parties ==
Minor parties in the order in which they registered with the Central Elections Committee.

- HaHazon (The Vision) (צדק בראשות אבי ילאו)
- Ani VeAta (Me and You) (כבוד ושוויון)
- Otzma Liberalit Kalkalit (Liberal Economic Power) (עוצמה ליברלית כלכלית)
- Da'am: Green Economy – One State (דעם - כלכלה ירוקה מדינה אחת)
- Bible Bloc Party (Gush HaTanachi) (מפלגת הגוש התנ"כי)
- Zekhuyoteinu BeKoleinu ("Our Rights Are in Our Vote/Voice") (זכויותנו בקולנו - לחיים בכבוד)
- HaLev HaYehudi (The Jewish Heart) (הלוי היהודי)
- Mishpat Tzedek (Fair Trial) (משפט צדק)
- Social Leadership (מנהיגות חברתית)
- Mitkademet (Leader) (מתקדמת)
- Kol HaNashim (Voice the Women) (קול הנשים)
- Seder Hadash (סדר חדש - לשינוי שיטת הבחירות)
- Peula LeYisrael (Action for Israel) (פעולה למען ישראל)
- Pirate Party (Piratim) (הפיראטים - כי כולנו באותה סירה והכל אותו שייט)
- Uncorrupted Red White (אדום לבן - לגליזציה לקנביס, שוויון לאתיופים, ערבים ומקופחים)
- Kama – Advancing the Status of the Individual (קמ"ה - קידום מעמד הפרט)
- HaBrit HaMeshutefet (The United Covenant)(מאוחד ברית)
- Kavod HaAdam (Respect for People) (כבוד האדם)
- Shema (Listen) (להקשיב)
- Tzomet (צומת - התיישבות וחקלאות)
- Koah Lehashpi'a (The Power to Influence) (כוחו של השפעה)
- Otzma Yehudit (Jewish Strength) (עוצמה יהודית)
