= Party lists for the April 2019 Israeli legislative election =

The April 2019 Israeli legislative election was held using closed list proportional representation. Each party presented a list of candidates to the Central Elections Committee prior to the election.

== Blue and White ==
The Blue and White list is headed by Benny Gantz and Yair Lapid.

1. Benny Gantz
2. Yair Lapid
3. Moshe Ya'alon
4. Gabi Ashkenazi
5. Avi Nissenkorn
6. Meir Cohen
7. Miki Haimovich
8. Ofer Shelah
9. Yoaz Hendel
10. Orna Barbivai
11. Michael Biton
12. Hili Tropper
13. Yael German
14. Zvi Hauser
15. Orit Farkash-Hacohen
16. Karin Elharar
17. Meirav Cohen
18. Yoel Razvozov
19. Asaf Zamir
20. Yizhar Shai
21. Elazar Stern
22. Mickey Levy
23. Omer Yankelevich
24. Pnina Tamano-Shata
25. Gadeer Mreeh
26. Ram Ben Barak
27. Alon Schuster
28. Yoav Segalovitz
29. Ram Shefa
30. Boaz Toporovsky
31. Orly Fruman
32. Eitan Ginzburg
33. Gadi Yevarkan
34. Idan Roll
35. Yorai Lahav-Hertzanu
36. Moshe Matalon
37. Einav Kabla
38. Aliza Lavie
39. Itzhak Ilan
40. Tehila Friedman
41. Hila Vazan
42. Moshe Tur-Paz
43. Ruth Wasserman Lande
44. Zehorit Sorek
45. Alon Tal
46. Michal Cotler-Wunsh
47. Anat Knafo
48. Yair Farjun
49. Debbie Biton
50. Idit Wexler
51. Vladimir Beliak
52. Keren Gonen
53. Yifat Ben Shoshan
54. Monica Lev Cohen
55. Ofra Finkelstein
56. Ya'akov Abu El Gian
57. Elyakim Nagid
58. Naor Shiri
59. Anat Shedami
60. Oz Haim
61. Mordechai Mizrahi
62. Inbar Bezek
63. Dan Reshel
64. Avery Steiner
65. Yaron Levi
66. Liad Herman
67. Nira Shpak
68. Yosef Tubor
69. Ronit Yuval
70. Moshiko Erez
71. Reuven Muzer
72. Shimon Sassi
73. Oren Or Biton
74. Sarit Handknopf
75. Daniel Avigdor
76. Liron Ben Tal
77. Ya'akov Levi
78. Noah Shmilov
79. Ohr Shalev
80. Tania Mazarsky
81. Ori Tzemach
82. Tomer Viur
83. Andrey Kozhinov
84. Hali Sinai
85. Gali Ofir
86. Yaron Mishori
87. Osnat Dror
88. David Shabbat
89. Yoav Ben Shalom
90. Shaked Benafshi
91. Michael Yisraelov
92. Ilana Bikabeltov
93. Yariv Friedman
94. Inbal Ben-Brit Cohen
95. Shlomit Friebar
96. Yigal Goroni
97. Nili Yohoshua
98. Amir Shoshani
99. Michael Gorin
100. Doron Pedahtzur
101. Golney Bochnik
102. Eran Dorovitch
103. Ilana Korotin
104. Uzi Yona
105. Ester Cohen
106. Sarah Pasternek
107. Boris Yampolski
108. Tzivia Berger Cohen
109. Zohar Bloom
110. Iris Segev
111. Dvorah Weinstein
112. Ilan Factor
113. Eliyahu Asulin
114. Orit Shani
115. Omri Nahum
116. Dalit Gur Cohen
117. Yasmin Fridman
118. Shoshana Inbar
119. Fier Bernas
120. Ronny Someck

== Gesher ==
Gesher is a breakaway party led by Orly Levy-Abekasis.

1. Orly Levi-Abekasis
2. David Perlmutter
3. Yifat Bitton
4. Haggai Reznik
5. Gilad Samama
6. Carmen Elmakiyes
7. Michal Nagari Hirsch
8. Liat Yakir
9. Haggai Lavie
10. Dan Shaham
11. Ronit Lev Ari
12. Malka Oliel
13. Yehudit Yifrah
14. Orly Kanubal
15. Noa Eliaz
16. Yehuda Katz
17. Eran Amir
18. Ziv Atiyah

== Hadash–Ta'al ==
Hadash and Ta'al are running separately from the Joint List that they were part of at the last Knesset.

1. Ayman Odeh
2. Ahmad Tibi
3. Aida Touma-Suleiman
4. Osama Saadi
5. Ofer Cassif
6. Yousef Jabareen
7. Sondos Saleh
8. Jabar Asakla
9. Talal Alkernawi
10. Youssef Atauna
11. Wael Younis
12. Halad Hasuna
13. Noa Levi
14. Mohar Hosin
15. Padaa Naara
16. Hasan Hagla
17. Aatmad Kaadan
18. Shadi Abbas
19. Nabil Halaj
20. Gasan Abdullah
21. Darvish Rabi
22. Mohamed Kashkosh
23. Omer Wachad
24. Wasi Abu Ahmed
25. Safuat Abu Ria
26. Shadi Zidan
27. Ziad Odah
28. Kassam Salam
29. Ibrahim El Sariyah
30. Monir Hamuda
31. Shochri Ouda
32. Shahira Morad
33. Mohamed Wated
34. Samah Araki
35. Noha Badar
36. May Gabar
37. Basal Darusha
38. Omri Barnas
39. Saad Paor
40. Oruah Sif
41. Mahar Achri
42. Hitam Wachad
43. Ali Saruji
44. Tzadok Tzadok
45. Vered Kubati
46. Kaid Alexasi
47. Busina Davit
48. Matua Haj-Yehiya
49. Omri Evron
50. Amami Halaila
51. Irin Hakira
52. Faris Abu Abaid
53. Meged Tibi
54. Ria Zahar
55. Sarur Mahammud
56. Said Issa
57. Raga Zaaraka
58. Oren Peled
59. Kassam Hoash
60. Lila Saliman
61. Nimrod Fleishenberg
62. Ahmed Haj Mohamed
63. Haviv Hagug
64. Rim Hazan
65. Ali Arash
66. Noraldin Hosin
67. Morid Mahmmud
68. Fathi Sabitah
69. Mohamed Haj Yehiah
70. Sami Yassin
71. Niroz Nafaa
72. Osama Karam
73. Tamar Kadiri
74. Dror Sadut
75. Ali Yassin
76. Bassam Abu Yassin
77. Zahi Salama
78. Abdalal Badoi
79. Aziri Basyoni
80. Magad Yusafin
81. Abduljabar
82. Yosef Lior
83. Naif Sachran
84. Mohamed Basul
85. Ala'a Naim
86. Nohad Sakes
87. Fatihya Sajir
88. Eitan Kalinsky
89. Hosam Shami
90. Yosef Amitai
91. Said Bechri
92. Laiti Sharif
93. Adana Zaritzky
94. Sharif Zoabi
95. Nissan Bracha
96. Ali Hidar
97. Abdalsalam Darusha
98. Efrayim Davidi
99. Amael Morkus
100. Manar Meiri
101. Mohamed Abari
102. Binyamin Gonan
103. Mussa Abu Sahibin
104. Tewfik Kanaana
105. Nagiba Jatas
106. Assad Kanana
107. Abdalkarim Salabna
108. Hana Sweid
109. Abdullah Abu Ma'aruf
110. Ramiz Jaraisy
111. Salah Abu Shahin
112. Dov Khenin
113. Mansur Dahamasha
114. Aadel Amar
115. Issam Makhoul
116. Yosef Shahin
117. Tamar Gozansky
118. Afu Agbaria
119. Mohamed Nafa

== Kulanu ==
The Kulanu list is headed by Moshe Kahlon.

1. Moshe Kahlon
2. Eli Cohen
3. Yifat Shasha-Biton
4. Roy Folkman
5. Tali Ploskov
6. Meirav Ben Ari
7. Akram Hasson
8. Asher Fentahun Seyoum
9. Nadav Sheinberger
10. Ram Shmueli
11. Roei Cohen
12. Yehuda Mimran
13. Yael Yifrah
14. Rotem Kakon
15. Rotem Cohen Kahlon
16. Yuval Dudu
17. Yosef Wolf
18. Herzel Lavi
19. Yaki Ben Haim
20. Doron Yehuda
21. Yaarit Ashush
22. Lior Shapira
23. Tal Sigron
24. Oran Koriat
25. Miri Levi Bacha
26. Shlomo Dahan
27. Raz Kiel
28. Menashe Shemesh
29. Roi Elrom
30. Gavri Karadi
31. Aviad Zandenberg
32. Ran Mazor
33. Ziad Saadi

== Labor Party ==
The Labor Party list is headed by Avi Gabbay.

1. Avi Gabbay
2. Tal Russo
3. Itzik Shmuli
4. Stav Shaffir
5. Shelly Yachimovich
6. Amir Peretz
7. Merav Michaeli
8. Omer Bar-Lev
9. Revital Swid
10. Haim Jelin
11. Eran Hermoni
12. Yaya Fink
13. Michal Biran
14. Gavri Bargil
15. Eitan Cabel
16. Yael Cohen Paran
17. Saleh Saad
18. Emilie Moatti
19. Leah Fadida
20. Henrique Cymerman
21. Michal Tzernovitzki
22. Lili Ben Ami
23. Ahsan Halailah
24. Nachman Shai
25. Gilad Kariv
26. Moshe Mizrahi
27. Yisrael Ziv
28. Saadi Kablan
29. Alice Goldman
30. Tomer Pines
31. Ran Shusterman
32. Gil Beilin
33. Ilan Lederer
34. Amir Hanifas
35. Agmi Baron
36. Farachan Abu Riash
37. Solomon Abrahami
38. Nazar Aalimi
39. Eti Almog-Bar
40. Salman Tarodi
41. Nisim Lasri
42. Shalom Daskal
43. Nir Dombak
44. David Landsman
45. Itamar Wagner
46. Zahava Ilani
47. Yigal Shapira
48. Ofer Kornfield
49. Telma Aligon-Rose
50. Richard Peres
51. Anat Cohen Shpacht
52. Atara Litvak-Shacham
53. Silvio Hoskovitz
54. Debbie Ben Ami
55. Anat Marciano
56. Pini Kablo
57. Orly Biti Shiloah
58. Haya Cohen
59. Fahim Ganam
60. Shmuel Mizrahi
61. Yitzhak Shahaf
62. Mishel Halimi
63. Dalas Haviner Kroytoro
64. Sara Shunami
65. Nisim Peretz
66. Jackie Halimi
67. Dan Bilker
68. Hen Malcha
69. Roi Ben David
70. Alon Viser
71. Ofer Rimon
72. Or Ziv
73. Shaked Nuri
74. Itamar Gabaton
75. Yoel Marshak
76. Timor Efroni
77. Tzvi Eisenberg
78. Yehonatan Regev
79. Ya'akov Mizrahi
80. Daniel Azulai
81. Tal Samahi
82. Noa Moalam
83. Gal Reich
84. Arnon Doikman
85. Yotam Dvir Dimora
86. Shai Masot
87. Asaf Kaplan
88. Rivka Ho Ravit
89. Hadassa Dayan
90. Gidon Meir
91. Aviad Sinai
92. Ilan Ben Saadon
93. Zohar Numerak
94. Mordechai Ajami
95. Yitzhak Yemini
96. Yitzhak Meron
97. Dror Aloni
98. Ran Koenik
99. Yitzhak Holbasky
100. Adanah Solodar
101. Yisrael Gal
102. Amir Rituv
103. Simon Alfasi
104. Danny Atar
105. Yehiel Bar
106. Daniel Ben-Simon
107. Micha Goldman
108. Alex Goldfarb
109. Danny Yatom
110. Shimon Shetreet
111. Yael Dayan
112. Masha Lubelsky
113. Ron Huldai
114. Amram Mitzna
115. Ophir Pines-Paz
116. Ra'anan Cohen
117. Moshe Shahal
118. Uzi Baram
119. Aharon Yadlin
120. Shlomo Hillel

== Likud ==
The Likud list is headed by current Prime Minister Benjamin Netanyahu.

1. Benjamin Netanyahu
2. Yuli-Yoel Edelstein
3. Yisrael Katz
4. Gilad Erdan
5. Gideon Sa'ar
6. Miri Regev
7. Yariv Levin
8. Yoav Gallant
9. Nir Barkat
10. Gila Gamliel
11. Avi Dichter
12. Zeev Elkin
13. Haim Katz
14. Tzachi Hanegbi
15. Ofir Akunis
16. Yuval Steinitz
17. Tzipi Hotovely
18. Dudi Amsalem
19. Amir Ohana
20. Ofir Katz
21. Eti Atiya
22. Yoav Kish
23. David Bitan
24. Keren Barak
25. Shlomo Karhi
26. Miki Zohar
27. Eli Ben Dahan
28. Sharren Haskel
29. Michal Shir
30. Keti Shitrit
31. Fateen Mulla
32. May Golan
33. Uzi Dayan
34. Ariel Kellner
35. Osnat Mark
36. Amit Halevi
37. Nissim Vaturi
38. Shevah Stern
39. Ayoub Kara
40. Erez Tadmor
41. Moti Yogev
42. Yehuda Glick
43. Nurit Koren
44. Ze'ev Flischman
45. Avital Dicter
46. Anat Berko
47. Rov Hirschman
48. Yaron Mazuz
49. Avraham Neguise
50. Nava Boker
51. Heidi Moses
52. Moshe Passal
53. Elad Malka
54. Ya'akov Ben Sadon
55. Shalom Danino
56. Zohar Tal
57. Assaf Yitzhaki
58. Ayala Steigman
59. Yosef Moalem
60. Tzachi Dicstein
61. Noam Selah
62. Dima Taiya
63. Elad Yona
64. Ata Parchat
65. David Avava
66. Tzofiya Nahon
67. Michael Lubobikov
68. Osama Navoani
69. Samir Kadiba
70. Ya'akov Vider
71. Salah Salah
72. Hassan Haib
73. Gumah Azbarga
74. Biyhad Mustafa
75. Faisel Hativ
76. Yoel Nagar
77. Lior Avavah Levatah
78. Mendi Safdi
79. Hinda Freidlman
80. Gilad Maharat
81. Jackie Pinto
82. Raffa Halabi
83. Gershon Eyalgieg
84. Tanogi Cohen
85. Shosh Halevi
86. Yosef Ben Pinhas
87. Shimon Hananel
88. Shimon Asael
89. Sinai Kehat
90. Dov Gilboa
91. Ze'ev Ben Yosef
92. Shlomo Madmon
93. Naomi Blumenthal
94. Yael Shamargad
95. Tova Maoz
96. Yohai Shitrit
97. Nissim Padida
98. Yaffa Lau
99. Hedva Speigel
100. Naor Naftali
101. Ziva Ben Dror
102. Eli Biton
103. Tziporah Feinberg
104. Eti Timor
105. Shabtai Kashat
106. Ariel Bochinek
107. Daliah Eigler
108. Bat Sheva Hahermoni
109. Elchanan Vinitski
110. Dudu Mor
111. Tzvi Eigler
112. Kokhava Matityahu
113. Haya Shamir
114. Akiva Nof
115. Michael Kleiner
116. Yosef Ahimeir
117. Miriam Glazer-Ta'asa
118. Zalman Shoval
119. Moshe Nissim

== Meretz ==
The Meretz list is headed by Tamar Zandberg.

1. Tamar Zandberg
2. Ilan Gilon
3. Michal Rozin
4. Issawi Frej
5. Ali Salalha
6. Mehereta Baruch-Ron
7. Mossi Raz
8. Avi Buskila
9. Gaby Lasky
10. Avi Dabush
11. Cathy Piatzki Morag
12. Yaniv Shagia
13. Yariv Oppenheimer
14. Anat Nir
15. Nir Cohen
16. Tomer Resnik
17. Mazen Abu Siam
18. Shai Agozi
19. Eliran Bichovsky
20. Susan Becher
21. Gilad Bar-On
22. Eyal Bergman
23. Giora Baram
24. Galia Golan Gold
25. Talilah Goren
26. Sagit Gurfinkel
27. Bar Gisin
28. Emily Greensweig
29. Danya Dobson
30. Tom Dromi Hakim
31. Ilai Harsagor-Henden
32. Veronica Vigdorchik
33. Laura Wharton
34. Walid Vated
35. Ofer Zabner
36. Rakefet Zohar
37. Etti Zidenberg
38. Omima Hamad
39. Oren Toktali
40. Shani Cohen
41. Ester Levanon Mordon
42. Ronny Lahav
43. Eyal Luria-Pardes
44. Shelly Milberg
45. Noa Noimark
46. Itay Savirsky
47. Saadia Sadik-Masaruah
48. Yifat Solel
49. Salah Salalaha
50. Avi Ofer
51. Shosh Orer
52. Yoram Kendel
53. Maya Karbatri
54. Shuki Kromer
55. Yael-Hanna Kriger
56. Michael Regev
57. Simi Rokeah Ohayon
58. Shira Shagia Grucher
59. Omer Shechter
60. Ori Shmulevitz
61. Eidan Lamdan
62. Nir Elah
63. Dor Ben Dor
64. Adi Gisis Steinman
65. Abdul Haruv
66. Fuad Saliman
67. Roi Peled
68. Giora Ram-Forman
69. Daniel Tzarfati
70. Tom Cohen
71. Gal Goldman
72. Sara Greensweig
73. Tzachi Zalicha
74. Yosef Alalo
75. Viviana Wolfson
76. Chagit Ofran
77. Natalie Kirstein
78. Ronit Winterov
79. Ilanit Harush
80. Visam Kashkosh
81. Zivah Sternhel
82. Nissim Chayun
83. Noa Satet
84. Nissim Kalderon
85. Silvia Bizoy
86. Chelli Goldenberg
87. Roni Trainin
88. Moris Shachada
89. Susan Silberman
90. Itamar Swika
91. Suad Shahada
92. Naomi Tziyon
93. Tsvia Walden
94. Rafael Walden
95. Avner de-Shalit
96. Ester Zacheim Gross
97. Alex Levac
98. Dani Karavan
99. Ruth Rasnic
100. Nilli Oz
101. Ruth Dayan
102. Yishai Sarid
103. Yosef Marziano
104. Hayim Hayat
105. Latif Dori
106. Mihal Shochat
107. Dror Morag
108. Shlomo Molla
109. Anat Maor
110. Colette Avital
111. Mordechai Bar-On
112. Amira Sartani
113. David Zucker
114. Avshalom Vilan
115. Hussniya Jabara
116. Naomi Chazan
117. Ran Cohen
118. Yair Tzaban
119. Yossi Beilin
120. Haim Oron

== The New Right ==
The New Right is a new party formed as a breakaway from The Jewish Home. Its leaders are Naftali Bennett and Ayelet Shaked.

1. Naftali Bennett
2. Ayelet Shaked
3. Alona Barkat
4. Matan Kahana
5. Shuli Mualem
6. Caroline Glick
7. Elyashiv Raichner
8. Uri Shekhter
9. Amichai Chikli
10. Shirly Pinto
11. Yomtob Kalfon
12. Ran Bar-Yoshafat
13. Roni Sassover
14. Moshe Peled
15. Yosef Ezra
16. Nachman Eyal
17. Avivi Tzipkin
18. Shai Maimon
19. Dorian Cohen-Nov
20. Yael Yahav
21. Nir Herman
22. Ohad Ozan
23. Jeremy Saltan
24. Yosef Mandalevich

== Shas ==
Shas is headed by Aryeh Deri.

1. Aryeh Deri
2. Yitzhak Cohen
3. Meshulam Nahari
4. Ya'akov Margi
5. Yoav Ben-Tzur
6. Michael Malchieli
7. Moshe Arbel
8. Yinon Azulai
9. Moshe Abutbul
10. Uriel Buso
11. Shlomo Dahan
12. Nahorai Lahiani
13. Yaakov Zacharyahu
14. Netanel Haik
15. Yosef Taieb
16. Yosef Tzedaka
17. Yonatan Mishraki
18. Lior Shaar
19. Tal Matityahu
20. Netanel Nahum
21. Elchanan Zevulun
22. Kafir Ovadyah
23. Yosef Kakon
24. Yosef Rosh
25. Yisrael Ben Sasson
26. Yosef Moalam
27. Boaz Biton
28. Yehuda Ovaidi
29. Moshe Kaicov
30. Refael Benraz
31. Yaakov Maalimi
32. Moshe Ailuz
33. Michael Tafiro
34. Chaim Rosh
35. Asher Shoker
36. Meir Cohen Ben Hayim
37. Tzuriel Krispel
38. Hanan Zigdon
39. Hayim Asmaili
40. Avraham Betzalel
41. Avner Amar
42. Shmuel Marziano
43. Yehiel Tzruya
44. Manny Azulai
45. Dvir Luzon
46. Dan Cohen
47. David Cohen
48. Yigal Hadar
49. Yaacov Agasi
50. Saban Cohen
51. Avi Ben Avraham
52. Shlomo Ezran
53. Yair Elchadad
54. Yitzchak Hadad
55. Uzi Aharon
56. Moshe Vaknin
57. Shlomo Zalman Soyonov
58. Eliyahu Karai
59. Haggai Hadad
60. Eli Dadon
61. Ami Biton
62. Yosef Okanin
63. Tziyon Gazla
64. Yitzchak Elimelech
65. Shlomo Elcharar
66. Saadia Lopez
67. Yosef Turgeman
68. Meir Dahan
69. David Comus
70. Dan Tziyoni
71. Shimon Ben Shlomo
72. Hayim Ben Avraham
73. Yaacov Ben Shlomo
74. Yaacov Admoni
75. Efrayim Ohayon
76. Yehonatan Eliasi
77. Eli Ankonina
78. Meir Asulin
79. Avner Akava
80. Yaacov Biton
81. Yehiel Vaknin
82. Yitzchak Hudarah
83. Shai Hakshuri
84. Doron Taktuk
85. Hayim Tarab
86. Yishai Yizdai
87. Yehonatan Yalin
88. Yaacov Yuval
89. Yaacov Yifrah
90. Yehuda Yisraeli
91. Gavriel Cohen
92. Ofer Cohen
93. Rahamim Cohen
94. Moshe Levi
95. Meir Malka
96. Yitzchak Malchi
97. David Susiya
98. Ben Zion Siman Tov
99. Moshe Avitan
100. Hananel Harush
101. Yitzchak Avitabul
102. Yair Hamu
103. Netanel Cohen
104. Amit Pargon
105. Yosef Saltan
106. David Avitan
107. Moshe Cohen
108. Moshe Siboni
109. Yosef Niazoff
110. Shlomo Balhasan
111. Niv Ben Mocheh
112. Gidon Eliasi
113. Tzach Malul
114. Gadi Shalom
115. Shlomo Peretz
116. Aharon Cohen
117. Chaim Sabag
118. Gavriel Yisraelov
119. Hayim Baadani

== United Arab List–Balad ==
After the break-up of the Joint List, Balad and United Arab List ran a combined list.

1. Mansour Abbas
2. Mtanes Shehadeh
3. Abd al-Hakim Hajj Yahya
4. Heba Yazbak
5. Talab Abu Arar
6. Mazen Ghnaim
7. Said al-Harumi
8. Mohamed Abgabariah
9. Iman Khatib-Yasin
10. Ata Abu Madiam
11. Walid Kadan
12. Sima Sindaoy
13. Nimar Hoson
14. Orly Noy
15. Razi Issa
16. Tzafot Frige
17. Rauya Abu Raviah
18. Atya El Asam
19. Ahasan Haniah
20. Rasan Moniyar
21. Yehiya Daharmasa
22. Erin Havari
23. Mohamed Nassar
24. Nahala Tenus
25. Aida Fadila
26. Sami Jarban
27. Abed Masri
28. Iad Ravi
29. Aladin Zoabi Nassar
30. Lulu Taha
31. Mohamed Soa'ad
32. Ilaham Hamdan
33. Halad Afan
34. Sohilah Gatas
35. Mohamed Zavidat
36. Shalachat Antoan
37. Samar Samara
38. Avrahim Gatas
39. Rafat Ganim
40. Tagrid Gabarin-Jasar
41. Avrahim Rian
42. Nasri Said
43. Asmail El Gargaoi
44. Azaldin Badran
45. Mohamed Daas
46. Safa Agbariah
47. Yosef Padilah
48. Wail Omri
49. Mohamed Mahamid
50. Suliman Nasasara
51. Javadat Oydiah
52. Saliman El Atika
53. Fathi Amash
54. Saadia Shahav
55. Labad Abu Afash
56. Mustafa Abu Halal
57. Maruha Abad
58. Mohamed Satal
59. Amar Taha
60. Ranin Kais
61. Sohail Kayuan
62. Salah Hajj Yihia
63. Hosani Sultani
64. Mussa El Ovara
65. Mustafa Matani
66. Wassam Abud
67. Ibrahim Sachafi
68. Kosai Zamal
69. Abbas Amash
70. Jiris Sachas
71. Walid El Hoashlah
72. Albeir Andaria
73. Mohamed Masarua
74. George Shahada
75. Saad Jabar
76. Wasam Agbairiah
77. Sami Gabali
78. Mahmud Sa'ad
79. Mohamed Mitani
80. Nasser Zahara
81. Asmail Hasan
82. Ahmed Abu Amar
83. Omar A'asi
84. Isser Mezarib Abu Lil
85. Ahmed Shamruk
86. Bassam Shakur
87. Salah Kriim
88. Murad Hadad
89. Sami Ashawi
90. Michal Virshebski
91. Khaled Ghnaim
92. Silan Delal
93. Aiya Taha
94. Riad Mahamid
95. Atala al-Gamal
96. Adnan Matar
97. Nur Aldin Dabsan
98. Riad Ghattas
99. Mahmud Rian
100. Afnan Agbariah
101. Ibrahim Abu Laban
102. Leah Semal Virshebski
103. Ibrahim Shaliot
104. Hamza Hajj-Mohammed
105. Fathi Deka
106. Yussuf Shini
107. Mahasan Kis
108. Yussuf al-Karem
109. Juma Azbarga
110. Ibrahim al-Amur
111. Wasil Taha
112. Masud Ghnaim
113. Haneen Zoabi
114. Abdulmalik Dehamshe
115. Jamal Zahalka

== Union of the Right-Wing Parties ==
A combined list called the Union of the Right-Wing Parties, composed of The Jewish Home, Tkuma, and Otzma Yehudit, is running.

Michael Ben-Ari, who was originally in position 5 on the list, was removed by the Supreme Court.

1. Rafi Peretz
2. Bezalel Smotrich
3. Moti Yogev
4. Ofir Sofer
5. Idit Silman
6. Orit Strook
7. Itamar Ben-Gvir
8. Yossi Cohen
9. Davidi Ben-Zion
10. Amihai Eliyahu
11. Yehoshua Zohar
12. Naama Zarbib
13. Miriam Abragil
14. Pinchas Meyuchas
15. Yonatan Dobov
16. Moshe Peretz
17. Eyal Asad
18. Orly Rappaport Yudkowski
19. Yifat Harari
20. Erez Tzadok
21. Tzachi Maganzi
22. Yaacov Solar
23. Shimon Parchik
24. Ilana Dror
25. Tzvi Glintz
26. Oriya Reiter
27. Yael Ben-Yashar Ben-David
28. Yotam Karo
29. Chaim Marziano
30. Nitza Farkas
31. David Avicar
32. Shalom Stimler
33. Yael Saad
34. Yoel Toviana
35. Shmuel Meirovitz
36. Gavriel Klugman
37. Reuven Gur-Aryeh Habenstock
38. Yoela Rabinovitz
39. Yitzhak Wasserlauf
40. Bat-Sheva Shimoni
41. Yigal Hajaj
42. Avinoam Goalman
43. Meir Lozan
44. Moshe Cohen
45. Sagia Gaz
46. Eliyashiv Hacohen
47. Tzivya Lebovi
48. Nissan Slomiansky

== United Torah Judaism ==
United Torah Judaism's list was headed by Deputy Minister of Health Yaakov Litzman.

1. Yaakov Litzman
2. Moshe Gafni
3. Meir Porush
4. Uri Maklev
5. Ya'akov Tessler
6. Ya'akov Asher
7. Yisrael Eichler
8. Yitzhak Pindros
9. Eliyahu Hasid
10. Eliyahu Baruchi
11. Binyamin Hirschler
12. David Ohana
13. Naftali Herz Glotzki
14. Yitzhak Reich
15. Reuven Breish
16. Aryeh Zvi Boymal
17. Yehiel Aryeh Weingarten
18. Avraham Rubinstein
19. Yosef Deutch
20. Ya'akov Gutman
21. Haim Meir Weisel
22. Yitzhak Ravitz
23. Yohoshua Weinberger
24. Menachem Mendel Shapira
25. Avraham Zvi Rossgold
26. Moshe David Morgenstern
27. David Greengold
28. Shlomo Goldental
29. David Asher
30. Eliezer Zvi Rochberger
31. Mordechai Brisk
32. Avraham Benzion Deutch
33. Avraham Breslar
34. Mordechai Michael Alfer
35. Shimon Kroizer
36. Shimon Yisrael Kelerman
37. Yehuda Gutman
38. Yisrael Golomb
39. Menahem Mendel Klein
40. Yisrael Moshe Friedman
41. Pinchas Tzeinwirt
42. Shlomo Zelig Orlinski
43. Yitzhak Klein
44. Pinchas Badosh
45. Gedaliah Sheinin
46. Yehuda Yevrov
47. Haim Baruch Weichelder
48. Mordechai Ze'ev Bloi
49. Yehoshua Cohen
50. Shabtai Markowitz
51. David Rotner
52. Shmuel Greenberg
53. Shmuel Tirer
54. Pinchas Siroker
55. Eliyahu Donat
56. Yitzhak David Brener
57. Akiva Ovitz
58. David Zaltz
59. Ephraim Wiesel
60. Michael Melamed
61. Meir Ringel
62. Ori Yaffa
63. Shimon Goldberg
64. Meir Yisrael Saberldov
65. Michael Garlitz
66. Avraham Pinchas Stern
67. Shmuel David Shock
68. Shimon Tuval
69. Shlomo Kostlitz
70. Shlomo Ephraim Pollak
71. Ahraon Tirhoz
72. Mordechai Goldberg
73. Yehezkel Bakenrot
74. Yosef Shitrit
75. Yisrael Haim Cohen
76. Eliyahu Yosef Broner
77. Yisrael Miller
78. Yitzhak Epstein
79. Pinchas Barim
80. Shlomo Hominer
81. Eliyahu Shachter
82. Aryeh Yehuda Pollak
83. Yekutiel Neiman
84. Binyamin Lewinstein
85. Shlomo Deutch
86. Shlomo Montag
87. David Rubinstein
88. Ofer Ezra
89. Moshe Lavron
90. Nissan Lavi
91. Ya'akov Yosef Ganz
92. Aryeh Zisman
93. Yehuda Aryeh Rosen
94. Elhanan Fromer
95. Ya'akov Haim Zorger
96. David Miller
97. Aryeh Weitz
98. Efphrayim Weiss
99. Moshe Yosef Overlander
100. Natan Weiss
101. Asher Hanun
102. Shlomo Stern
103. Haim Shmuel Bakerman
104. Yona Moskowitz
105. Binyamin Ze'ev Haker
106. Moshe Frank
107. Yoel Froilich
108. Elhanan Ehrentreu
109. Eliyahu Gafni
110. Moshe Man
111. Yehezkel Landau
112. Avraham Yitzhak Mishovski
113. Yehuda Roth
114. Ya'akov Vijbinski
115. Yohoshua Mendel
116. Shimon Chadar
117. Avraham Shwartz
118. Eliyahu Mordechai Karlitz
119. Hanoch Zeibert
120. Eliezer Sorotskin

== Yisrael Beiteinu ==
The Yisrael Beiteinu list is headed by Avigdor Lieberman.

1. Avigdor Lieberman
2. Oded Forer
3. Evgeny Sova
4. Eli Avidar
5. Yulia Malinovsky
6. Hamad Amar
7. Alex Kushnir
8. Mark Ifraimov
9. Limor Magen Telem
10. Elina Bardach-Yalov
11. Shadi Halul
12. Alexander Friedman
13. Dor Doydian
14. Shachar Alon
15. Ilana Kratysh
16. Moshe Sadia
17. Boris Schindler
18. Hila Yadid Barzilai
19. Aviv Cohen
20. Amir Shneider

== Zehut ==
Zehut is a libertarian party headed by Moshe Feiglin.

1. Moshe Feiglin
2. Haim Amsalem
3. Gilad Alper
4. Ronit Dror
5. Libby Molad
6. Shai Malka
7. Refael Minnes
8. Albert Levy
9. Ron Tzafrir
10. Ben Tzion Spitz
11. Yiskah Binah
12. Shmuel Sackett
13. Shlomo Gordon
14. Arcadi Mutter
15. David Spitz
16. Asya Entov
17. Nitza Kahane
18. Idan Mor
19. Tzvi Ben Tzion Sand
20. David Sidman
21. Hagai Greentzeig
22. Tovah Even Chen
23. Hagai Ben Ami
24. Nadav Halamish
25. Alex Elman
26. Meir Kadosh
27. Michael Puah
28. Moshe Marom
29. Uri Noi
30. Adam Ruso
31. Rafi Farber
32. Aryeh Zonenberg
33. Michael Brichzer
34. Lior Yado
35. Yaacov Lavern
36. Adiel Sharabi
37. Shlomo Wolfish
38. Guy Lilian
39. David Ovadiah
40. Yirmiyahu Taub
41. Michael Savasah
42. Tomer Gordman
43. Dorothy Marom
44. Eliyahu Ben Asher
45. Moshe Aroch
46. Sagit Ben Tzvi
47. Gershon Kagan
48. Illi Nolar
49. Moshe Schwartzberger
50. Eldad Shimon
51. Elida Jacobson
52. Ofer Shimoni
53. Yarden Weber
54. Aryeh Bayit
55. David Rashid
56. Yosef Mantiband
57. Neriya Saada
58. Binyamin Elbaum
59. Moshe Basus
60. Boaz Beringer
61. Omer Gal
62. Elitzur Segal
63. Hemdat Shani
64. Li-On Fingler
65. Yotam Halprin
66. Hayim Friedman
67. David Ben Tzvi
68. Lior Hashmia
69. Itamar Holder
70. Mali Schmidt
71. Talia Cohen
72. Yosef Cohen
73. Daniel Gabbai
74. Aliza Waltzki Cohen
75. Alida Mendelson
76. Aharon Chalamish
77. Uriel Harpaz
78. Bar Yifrach
79. Ziva Katz
80. Gitit Botra
81. Amit Mizrachi
82. Yair Liberman
83. Lisa Liel
84. Eliyahu Sleizerman
85. Tomer Rashkovitsky
86. Kani Mark
87. Reuven Moriel
88. Elchanan Rafaeli
89. Ariyeh Kalkalar
90. Shachar Kalaminian
91. Hadar Rotenberg
92. Yigal Shefer
93. Ronen Hazan
94. Marius Popel
95. Aviner Hoshen
96. Roni Kashi
97. Iti Givon
98. Shelly Karzan
99. Guy Enosh
100. Ori Pokez
101. Moshe Wolf
102. Raziel Hess Green
103. Yonadav Stern
104. Eli Botra
105. Leah Karp
106. Uri Zilberman
107. Dana Shem Tov
108. Dror Kotner
109. Elad Azbodki
110. Alexander Loit
111. Yaron Modan

== Minor parties ==
The following are the lists for the minor parties running in the election that have not been featured in major opinion polling in the lead-up to the election.

=== Ahrayut LaMeyasdim ===
Ahrayut LaMeyasdim (Responsibility for Founders) is a party headed by former Knesset member, Haim Dayan.

1. Haim Dayan
2. Reuven Korman
3. Haim Ben Shalom
4. Ganadi Boroshovski
5. Yom Tov Bibey
6. Aminadav Argov
7. Yael Galzar
8. Hadas Karmitzer
9. Eli Cohen
10. Shmuel Zissman
11. Adam Anav
12. Ya'akov Levi
13. Hanina Dahan
14. Moshe Franko
15. Yitzhak Ben Yitzhak
16. Meir Tantz
17. Yitzhak Dishi
18. Eli Sahar
19. Peretz Sulam
20. Raisa Shtibler
21. Shmaya Lev Ran
22. Shalom Afalelo
23. Giora Mendler

=== Ani VeAta ===
Ani VeAta (Me and You) is a party focused on social issues and a stand against the "growing extremism in the right".

1. Alon Giladi
2. Zahava Ozabi
3. Rafael Ohayon
4. Amnon Vilner
5. Margalit Dod Hatzor
6. Yevgenia Ivashov
7. Yehuda Sharabi
8. Yael Gril
9. Meirav Gruber
10. Adit Hagbi
11. Yona Peleg
12. Geoffrey Mantzer
13. Haviva Tzidon
14. Limor Even Hen
15. Freida Nehama
16. Reuven Meshumar Adani
17. Yafa Pozilov
18. Ron Klapp
19. Ze'ev Cohen
20. Moshe Perlmutter
21. Feiga Gutman
22. Elroi Paz
23. Shulamit Stern

=== Arab List ===
The Arab List is a party that aims to achieve Palestinian statehood and equality for Arab citizens of Israel.

1. Muhamad Kanan
2. Afif Ibrahim
3. Halad Dirini
4. Mohamed Masri
5. Iyov Abu Siyud
6. Karam Mahamid
7. Osama Adoi
8. Vajaia Ibrahim
9. Manael Azam
10. Basam Zoabi
11. Mohadi Omar
12. Majda Miari
13. Hasal Abu Ras
14. Visam Asmail
15. Fiyad Hibi
16. Hasan Gaoi

=== Betah – Social Security ===
1. Semion Grafman
2. Eti Swartzberg
3. Moshe Moskowitz
4. Menahem Haim
5. Kashney Swartz
6. Oleg Lewinski
7. Chanis Lovov
8. Eli Zohar
9. David Agib
10. Avraham Partosh
11. Roman Leiderman
12. Daniel Harel

=== Brit Olam ===
Brit Olam is a social justice party committed to the separation of religion and state and the creation of a Palestinian state.

1. Ofer Lipshitz

=== Daam Workers Party ===
Daam is a communist party that aims to bring about the end of capitalism as a means to achieve social change.

1. Tamir Gal
2. Zoabi Menadra
3. Mihal Swartz Ben Efrat
4. Samia Nassar
5. Erez Wagner
6. Vaffa Tiarah
7. Daniel Ben Simchon
8. Yael Frenkel
9. Guy Elon
10. Tzipporah Freidman
11. Orit Sudri
12. Ornah Akad
13. Tomer Lahav
14. Tali Klagsborn
15. Adiv Lahav
16. Roni Ben Efrat
17. Arik Taylor
18. Assaf Adiv
19. Asma Aghbaria Zahalka
20. Ya'akov Ben Efrat

=== Education ===
1. Adir Zaltzar
2. Sigal Avishai
3. Eitan Finkelstein
4. Bracah Strausfield
5. Nir Naftali
6. Maya Simon
7. Salam Kidsi
8. Shlomo Blair
9. Ezer Graidi
10. Orly Holey
11. Haim Pashi
12. Serah Sabat
13. Iris Barnea
14. Daliah Zahngi
15. Nitzchona Segev
16. Victor Ohana
17. Ruti Turgeman
18. Elah Aharon

=== HaTikva LeShinui ===
HaTikva LeShinui (Hope for Change) is an Arab Israeli party that aims for equality between the Arab and Jewish citizens of Israel.

1. Rami Mohamed
2. Tarad Abu Elasal
3. Hani Elhoashla
4. Mazan Kak
5. Samach Chaladi
6. Binan Taha
7. Abdullah Abdelrahman
8. Mohamed Abu Ghosh

=== Ihud Bnei HaBrit ===
Ihud Bnei HaBrit is headed by Bishara Shalian.

1. Bishara Shalian
2. Eyal Paltek
3. Yosef Sisu
4. Rami Abu Regev
5. Tzvi Gal Ed
6. A'adel Shahada
7. Amir Shalian

=== Justice for All ===
Justice for all is a party for all living creatures that fights for the rights of all life on the planet.

1. Ya'akov Casdi
2. Alon Doidov
3. Amma Aharonov
4. Rahel Ozen
5. Shai Erez
6. Sharma Lavi

=== Kavod HaAdam ===
1. Arkadi Pogetz
2. Gavriel Amirov
3. Alexander Alperin
4. Rahamim Niassov
5. Irlianna Trodjampor
6. Rochelle Babib
7. Peter Kolishnichko
8. Ya'akov Dadshev
9. Yinon Menahimov
10. Alexei Babib

=== Ketz ===
1. Denis Lipkin
2. Hannah Havah
3. Michael Bar-Netzer
4. David Friedman
5. Klaus Beker

=== LeMa'an Ezrahim Sug Bet ===
LeMa'an Ezrahim Sug Bet (For Second Class Citizens) believes that the country is being run by the rich for the rich, and stands for protecting average citizens.

1. Rafael Levingrond
2. David Michaeli
3. Michael Litvak
4. Hila Oz-Sharon
5. Akiva Lev
6. Uri Zar
7. Natalie Sachaik
8. Benzion Gagolah

=== Kol Yisrael Ahim and Peula LeYisrael ===
Kol Yisrael Ahim (All Israel Are Brothers) is a party dedicated to the Ethiopian community in Israel. They have formed a union with Peula LeYisrael (Action for Israel).

1. Alali Adamso
2. David Navi
3. Michael Corinaldi
4. Jambar Kabdah
5. Yosi Shisel
6. Zahava Aragi
7. Eli Raz
8. Avner Parachi
9. Aharon Sason
10. Amara Malko
11. Yuval Shokar
12. Sharon Halperin Barzilai
13. Advah Baza
14. Adir Maroi
15. Ariel Adari
16. Barhano Taronen

=== Magen ===
Magen (Protector) is led by retired general Gal Hirsch, and is focused on social issues.

1. Gal Hirsch
2. Yitzhak Elnar
3. Asher Tishler
4. Reim Pelach
5. Anna Farber
6. Shimon Camri
7. Ya'akov Farber
8. Shira Georgie
9. Romy Zondar-Kislev
10. Moshe Zoldan
11. Samar Hanno
12. Ester Farder
13. Aryeh Amit
14. Adi Ben Dror
15. Adi Lesker
16. Tamar Eliyahu
17. Herzl Loiper
18. Chai Pessach
19. Smadar Peretz
20. Shiran Selah Dan-Gur
21. Tamar Hovel
22. Eliya Simchov
23. Meor Morviah
24. Ruti Adri
25. Or Hayekari

=== Manhigut Hevratit ===
Manhigut Hevratit (Social Leadership) is a party that is focused on personal economic struggles in Israel and want a broad electoral coalition in the Knesset.

1. Ilan Meshicha Yar-Zanbar
2. Shaked Kahalon
3. Talia Rotenberg
4. Ehud Berkowitz
5. Eliyasaf Pesach

=== Mehathala ===
Mehathala (From the Start) is a party that is focused on economic issues.

1. David Erez
2. Anan Pelah
3. Norit Menachem
4. Gad Robovsky
5. Elad Stapensky
6. Anastasia Gloshkov
7. Yaniv Moyel
8. Netanel Balmes
9. Eiman Abu Tavama

=== Na Nach ===
Na Nach is a party of Breslov Hassidim.

1. Ilan Bronson
2. Nehama Darab Berkowitz
3. Hananiah Sharabi Shoker
4. Shmuel Siyag
5. Nes Shoshai
6. Yosef Toito
7. Meor Malin
8. Moshe Ofir
9. Baruch Fishman
10. Sharon Yosef
11. Yonatan Kliger
12. Nissim Yehezkel
13. Noam Nativ
14. Naor Shimoni
15. Moshe Shani
16. Yehezkel Yehezkel
17. Mordechai Barzilai
18. Feiga Kanapo
19. Ester Shani
20. Avraham Vershabski
21. Naftali Hertz Farkas
22. Avraham Cohen
23. Yehuda Friedman
24. Zamir Avraham
25. Yehonatan Perry
26. Moshe Yannai
27. Tomer Avraham
28. Nitzan Koppel
29. Yisrael Ben Yehiel
30. Eliya Tzairi
31. Matan Aviram
32. Eldad Madi
33. Shanir Yisraelit
34. Zohar Gorgi
35. Adi Ran

=== New Zionist Party ===
The New Zionist Party is a libertarian party.

1. Binyamin Unger
2. Peracha Sefadi
3. Moshe Bar
4. Miriam Masri
5. Solomon Malul
6. Dan Kadron
7. Shai Shokron
8. Rachel Torknovitz

=== Ofek Hadash BeKavod ===
1. Salman Abu Ahmed
2. Mohamed al-Said
3. Mesam Majdob
4. Shoaki Shanon
5. Manar Hailla
6. Hiadra Mari
7. Ahmed Manaa
8. Majid Falah
9. Rawah Taha
10. Wasab Aasla
11. Yassar Moasi
12. Mohamed Salab

=== Older Citizen's Party ===
The Older Citizen's Party is a party dedicated to pensioner's rights.

1. Amit Saar Shalom
2. Ya'akov Ashrey
3. Yosef Galtzar
4. Yosef Kozdo
5. Avraham Sheinfein
6. Yitzhak Ziv
7. Linor Atias
8. Ofra Ohr
9. Yitzhak Banishti
10. Rivka Cohen
11. Feivel Rosenberg
12. Natan Strauss
13. Yerahmiel Cooperman
14. Henrik Roter
15. Yitzhak Shabtai
16. Ziv Eldror

=== Pashut Ahava ===
1. Lilian Weisberger
2. Anhar Masarwa
3. Rivia Basis
4. Yael Tridal
5. Anthony Heiman
6. Olifat Cheidar
7. Batina Zalof
8. Rima Basis
9. Yosef Jamal

=== Pirate Party ===
The Pirate Party is connected to the global network of Pirate Parties that fight for Internet freedoms.

1. Noam Kuzar
2. Ohad Shem Tov
3. Dan Biron
4. Kit Goldstein
5. Amit Didovski
6. Meital Rom
7. Itai Ankar
8. David Rom
9. Lior Mizrachi
10. Matan Goldberg
11. Ori Amikam

=== Pitaron LeAza ===
1. Shmuel Levi

=== Reform Party ===
1. Abed Alsala Kashua
2. Ismael Jamal
3. Yosef Shelby
4. Zahar Haskia
5. Iad Matani
6. Omir Cabha
7. Tamim Araki
8. Darjam Gabara
9. Azhar Nasar
10. Ednaan Araki
11. Hamdan Zamiro

=== Shavim ===
1. Mirit Entebe
2. Tally Gotliv
3. Eyal Shmuelevitz
4. Mordechai Fishler
5. Yaniv Peretz
6. Shadi Janam

=== Social Justice ===
Social Justice is a party dedicated to equality and democracy that is ideologically close to Binyamin Netanyahu.

1. Gad Haran
2. Nazim Saviti
3. Betali Yisraeli
4. Mordechai Ashkenazi
5. Yulia Ben Moshe
6. Benny Lotan
7. Efrayim Kahane
8. David Romano
9. Ilan Ronan
10. Nahum Gantzreski

=== Tzomet ===
Tzomet is a secular right wing party that was in the Knesset from 1984-1988.

1. Oren Hazan
2. Moshe Gerin
3. Ayelet Shlisel
4. Aviram Belzar
5. Sarah Erez
6. Nadir Sheiner
7. Guy Raif
8. Alexander Sholtz
9. Orit Hayun
10. Shental Hozner
11. Guy Salmon
12. Yishai Bosani
13. Moshe Gross
14. Sharona Tzur

=== Yashar Party ===
Yashar Party is a direct democracy party.

1. Yuval Karniel
2. Merav Teshuva-Shanhav
3. Malak Badar
4. Oded Gilotz
5. Aryeh Zidan
6. Dror Dassa
7. Almog Pilpeli
8. Dorit Eliyahu
9. Ira Katz-Galai
10. Rivka Hazan
11. Zeev Weisner Loven
12. Natan Menoam
13. Mihal Katosvski
14. Matan Pinkus
15. Sivan Holtzman
16. Arnon Boch

=== Zekhuyotenu BeKoleinu ===
Zekhuyotenu BeKoleinu (Our Rights In Our Vote) is a party that has a strong focus on strengthening the security services.

1. Gil Roter
2. David Siton
3. Shimon Cohen
4. Amir Berabi
5. Basam Kazal
6. Yafa Shahori
7. Shlomo Meyuhas
8. Shoshi Noval
9. Pelah Aleli
10. Yaniv Boaz
