= List of members of the twenty-third Knesset =

Israel's legislatures

23rd Knesset
| ← | 22nd | 24th | → |

Overview
- Legislative body: Knesset
- Jurisdiction: Israel
- Meeting place: Knesset building
- Term: 16 March – 23 December 2020
- Election: 2 March 2020
- Government: 35th government

Knesset
- President: Reuven Rivlin
- Prime minister: Benjamin Netanyahu
- Speaker: Yuli Edelstein; Benny Gantz (Note: Gantz replaced Edelstein as speaker on 26 March 2020); Yariv Levin (Note: Levin replaced Gantz as speaker on 13 May 2020)

The members of the 23rd Knesset were elected on 2 March 2020.

== Members of the Knesset ==
| Alliance | Party | Name |
|---|---|---|
| Likud (36) | | Benjamin Netanyahu • Yuli Edelstein • Israel Katz • Miri Regev • Yariv Levin • Yoav Gallant • Nir Barkat • Gila Gamliel • Avi Dichter • Haim Katz • Eli Cohen • Tzachi Hanegbi • Ofir Akunis • Yuval Steinitz • Dudi Amsalem • Gadi Yevarkan • Ofir Katz • Eti Atiya • Yoav Kisch • David Bitan • Keren Barak • Shlomo Karhi • Miki Zohar • Yifat Shasha-Biton (Note: Announced plan to join New Hope but did not resign) • Keti Shitrit • Patin Mula • May Golan • Tali Ploskov • Uzi Dayan • Ariel Kallner • Osnat Mark • Amit Halevi • Nissim Vaturi • Shevah Stern • Ayoob Kara • Matti Yogev |
| Yesh Atid-Telem (19) (Note: Blue and White alliance split into Blue and White party, Yesh Atid–Telem and Derekh Eretz in March 2020) | Yesh Atid (16) | Yair Lapid • Meir Cohen • Orna Barbivai • Karin Elharar • Yoel Razvozov • Elazar Stern • Mickey Levy • Gadeer Mreeh • Ram Ben-Barak • Yoav Segalovitz • Boaz Toporovsky • Idan Roll • Yorai Lahav-Hertzanu • Vladimir Beliak • Moshe Tur-Paz • Anat Knafo |
| Yesh Atid-Telem (19) | Telem (3) | Moshe Ya'alon • Orly Fruman • Andrey Kozhinov |
| Blue and White (12) | | Benny Gantz • Gabi Ashkenazi • Miki Haimovich • Asaf Zamir • Yizhar Shai • Omer Yankelevich • Pnina Tamano-Shata • Eitan Ginzburg • Michal Cotler-Wunsh • Tehila Friedman • Yael Ron Ben-Moshe • Ruth Wasserman Lande |
| Joint List (15) | Hadash (5) | Ayman Odeh • Aida Touma-Suleiman • Ofer Cassif • Yousef Jabareen • Jabar Asakla |
| Joint List (15) | Ra'am (4) | Mansour Abbas • Walid Taha • Said al-Harumi • Iman Khatib-Yasin |
| Joint List (15) | Balad (3) | Mtanes Shehadeh • Heba Yazbak • Sami Abu Shehadeh |
| Joint List (15) | Ta'al (3) | Ahmad Tibi • Osama Saadi • Sondos Saleh |
| Shas (9) | | Yitzhak Cohen • Meshulam Nahari • Ya'akov Margi • Michael Malchieli • Moshe Arbel • Yinon Azulai • Moshe Abutbul • Uriel Buso • Yosef Taieb |
| United Torah Judaism (7) | Agudat Yisrael (3) | Yaakov Litzman • Ya'akov Tessler • Yisrael Eichler |
| United Torah Judaism (7) | Degel HaTorah (4) | Moshe Gafni • Ya'akov Asher • Yitzhak Pindrus • Eliyahu Baruchi |
| Yisrael Beiteinu (7) | | Avigdor Lieberman • Oded Forer • Evgeny Sova • Eli Avidar • Yulia Malinovsky • Hamad Amar • Alex Kushnir |
| Yamina (5) (Note: The Jewish Home split from Yamina alliance on 14 July 2020) | New Right (3) | Naftali Bennett • Ayelet Shaked • Matan Kahana |
| Yamina (5) | Tkuma (2) | Bezalel Smotrich • Ofir Sofer |
| Meretz (4) | | Nitzan Horowitz • Tamar Zandberg • Yair Golan • Ilan Gilon |
| Labor (2) | | Itzik Shmuli • Merav Michaeli |
| Derekh Eretz (2) | | Yoaz Hendel • Zvi Hauser |
| Gesher (1) | | Orly Levy |
| The Jewish Home (1) | | Rafi Peretz |

=== Replacements ===
| Date | Replacement | Party | Replacing | Notes |
|---|---|---|---|---|
| 16 March 2020 | Idan Roll | Blue and White | Yael German | Yael German retired for health reasons before she was sworn in. |
| 19 June 2020 | Yorai Lahav-Hertzanu | Yesh Atid–Telem | Hili Tropper | Tropper resigned from the Knesset under the Norwegian Law after being appointed to the cabinet |
| 19 June 2020 | Yitzhak Pindros | United Torah Judaism | Meir Porush | Porush resigned from the Knesset under the Norwegian Law after being appointed to the cabinet |
| 19 June 2020 | Michal Cotler-Wunsh | Blue and White | Alon Schuster | Schuster resigned from the Knesset under the Norwegian Law after being appointed to the cabinet |
| 19 June 2020 | Einav Kabla | Blue and White | Asaf Zamir | Zamir resigned from the Knesset under the Norwegian Law after being appointed to the cabinet |
| 19 June 2020 | Tehila Friedman | Blue and White | Michael Biton | Biton resigned from the Knesset under the Norwegian Law after being appointed to the cabinet |
| 21 June 2020 | Hila Vazan | Blue and White | Yizhar Shai | Shai resigned from the Knesset under the Norwegian Law after being appointed to the cabinet |
| 21 June 2020 | Uriel Buso | Shas | Aryeh Deri | Shai resigned from the Knesset under the Norwegian Law after being appointed to the cabinet |
| 24 June 2020 | Eliyahu Hasid | United Torah Judaism | Yaakov Litzman | Litzman resigned from the Knesset under the Norwegian Law after being appointed to the cabinet |
| 24 June 2020 | Eliyahu Baruchi | United Torah Judaism | Uri Maklev | Maklev resigned from the Knesset under the Norwegian Law after being appointed to the cabinet |
| 1 July 2020 | Yosef Taieb | Shas | Yoav Ben-Tzur | Ben-Tzur resigned from the Knesset under the Norwegian Law after being appointed to the cabinet |
| 5 July 2020 | Ariel Kallner | Likud | Tzipi Hotovely | Hotovely resigned from the Knesset under the Norwegian Law after being appointed to the cabinet |
| 5 July 2020 | Osnat Mark | Likud | Gilad Erdan | Erdan resigned after becoming the Permanent Representative of Israel to the United Nations |
| 30 July 2020 | Amit Halevi | Likud | Amir Ohana | Ohana resigned from the Knesset under the Norwegian Law after being appointed to the cabinet |
| 15 September 2020 | Yaakov Litzman | United Torah Judaism | Eliyahu Baruchi | Litzman returned to the Knesset after leaving his ministerial post |
| 6 October 2020 | Asaf Zamir | Blue and White | Orit Farkash-Hacohen | Zamir returned to the Knesset after resigning from his ministerial role, while Farkash-Hacohen resigned as an MK to take Zamir's former ministerial post |
| 14 October 2020 | Eliyahu Baruchi | United Torah Judaism | Eliyahu Hasid | Hasid resigned to maintain the balance of parties within UTJ |
| 11 December 2020 | Nissim Vaturi | Likud | Gideon Sa'ar | Sa'ar resigned from the Knesset after leaving Likud |
| 24 December 2020 | Shevah Stern | Likud | Michal Shir | Shir resigned from the Knesset after leaving Likud |
| 25 December 2020 | Ayoob Kara | Likud | Sharren Haskel | Haskel resigned from the Knesset after leaving Likud |
| 27 December 2020 | Matti Yogev | Likud | Ze'ev Elkin | Elkin resigned from the Knesset after leaving Likud |
| 29 December 2020 | Yael Ron Ben-Moshe | Blue and White | Ofer Shelah | Shelah resigned from the Knesset after leaving Yesh Atid |
| 5 January 2021 | Vladimir Beliak | Yesh Atid | Avi Nissenkorn | Nissenkorn resigned from the Knesset after leaving Blue and White |
| 5 January 2021 | Moshe Tur-Paz | Yesh Atid | Einav Kabla | Kabla resigned from the Knesset after leaving Blue and White |
| 8 January 2021 | Ruth Wasserman Lande | Blue and White | Meirav Cohen | Cohen resigned from the Knesset after leaving Blue and White |
| 12 January 2021 | Yizhar Shai | Blue and White | Ruth Wasserman Lande | Shai resigned from the government and gained back his seat through the Norwegian Law |
| 31 January 2021 | Ruth Wasserman Lande | Blue and White | Ram Shefa | Shefa resigned from his Knesset seat and was replaced by Lande |
| 28 January 2021 | Ilan Gilon | Meretz | Amir Peretz | Peretz resigned from the Knesset |
| 2 February 2021 | Anat Knafo | Yesh Atid | Hila Vazan | Vazan resigned from the Knesset in order to join New Hope and was replaced by Knafo |

== See also ==
- Thirty-fifth government of Israel
