= Party lists for the 2019 Israeli legislative election =

Party lists for the 2019 Israeli legislative election may refer to:

- Party lists for the April 2019 Israeli legislative election
- Party lists for the September 2019 Israeli legislative election
