= Nira Shpak =

Member of Knesset

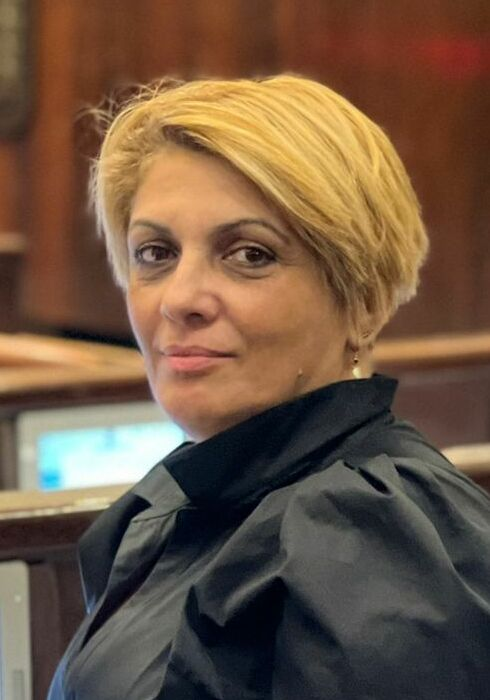
- Shpak in 2022

Faction represented in the Knesset
- 2021–2022: Yesh Atid

Personal details
- Born: 20 July 1966 (age 60) Rehovot, Israel

Nira Shpak (Hebrew: נִירָה שְׁפָּק; born 20 July 1966) is an Israeli soldier, civil servant and politician. She was a member of the Knesset for Yesh Atid from 2021 to 2022.

== Biography ==
A member of the Kfar Aza kibbutz, Shpak was a career soldier. She was the first woman to reach the rank of brigade commander and commander of an operational sector, and was the first woman to lead the training section of the Israeli Ground Forces. After being discharged with the rank of brigadier general, she worked at the Ministry of Defense and Ministry of Home Front Defense.

Entering politics, she ran for head of the Sha'ar HaNegev Regional Council in the 2018 local elections. Prior to the 2021 Knesset elections she was placed seventeenth on the Yesh Atid list, and was elected to the Knesset as the party won seventeen seats. In May 2022 she was a recipient of the Knights of the Quality of Government award by the Movement for Quality Government in Israel. However, she did not contest the November 2022 elections, choosing to return to local politics.
