= Bible Bloc Party =

Political party in Israel

Bible Bloc Party גּוּשׁ הַתָּנָכִי
- Leader: Dennis Lipkin
- Founder: Dennis Lipkin
- Registered: 2018
- Ideology: Religious Zionism; Greater Israel; Jewish-Christian unity Christian interests Messianic Jewish interests
- Political position: Right-wing
- Religion: Judaism, Christianity

Website
- www.ght.org.il

The Bible Bloc Party (Hebrew: גּוּשׁ הַתָּנָכִי, romanized: Gush HaTanachi) is a minor political party in Israel.

== History ==
The party was created by Dennis (Avi) Lipkin, a veteran religious Jewish speaker to Evangelical Christians in the US and a well-known lecturer who has spoken in over 1,000 churches. It has run for the Knesset since 2019, seeking the vote of non-Jewish Russian immigrants from the former Soviet Union and Christian Arabs, winning about 0.01% of the total vote.

In January 2024, the party's leader Dennis (Avi) Lipkin declared on video, "Most of the Middle East belongs to Israel. Eventually, our borders will extend from Lebanon, the great desert, which is Saudi Arabia, and then from the Mediterranean to the Euphrates." Mr. Lipkin also articulates his belief, stating, "I believe we're going to take Mecca, Medina, and Mount Sinai and purify those places."

== Ideology ==
The party strongly supports unity between Jews and Christians. It opposes the two-state solution and Palestinian statehood, instead arguing for imposing Israeli sovereignty over the entire land. It is also opposed to yerida, which it wants to solve through improving economic conditions in Israel.

== Election results ==
=== Knesset ===
Election	Leader	Votes	%	Seats	+/−	Status
Apr 2019	Dennis Lipkin	353	0.01	0 / 120	New	Extra-parliamentary
Sep 2019	Dennis Lipkin	497	0.01	0 / 120	0	Extra-parliamentary
2020	Dennis Lipkin	389	0.01	0 / 120	0	Extra-parliamentary
2021	Dennis Lipkin	429	0.01	0 / 120	0	Extra-parliamentary
2022	Dennis Lipkin	411	0.01	0 / 120	0	Extra-parliamentary
