= Yizhar Shai =

Israeli politician

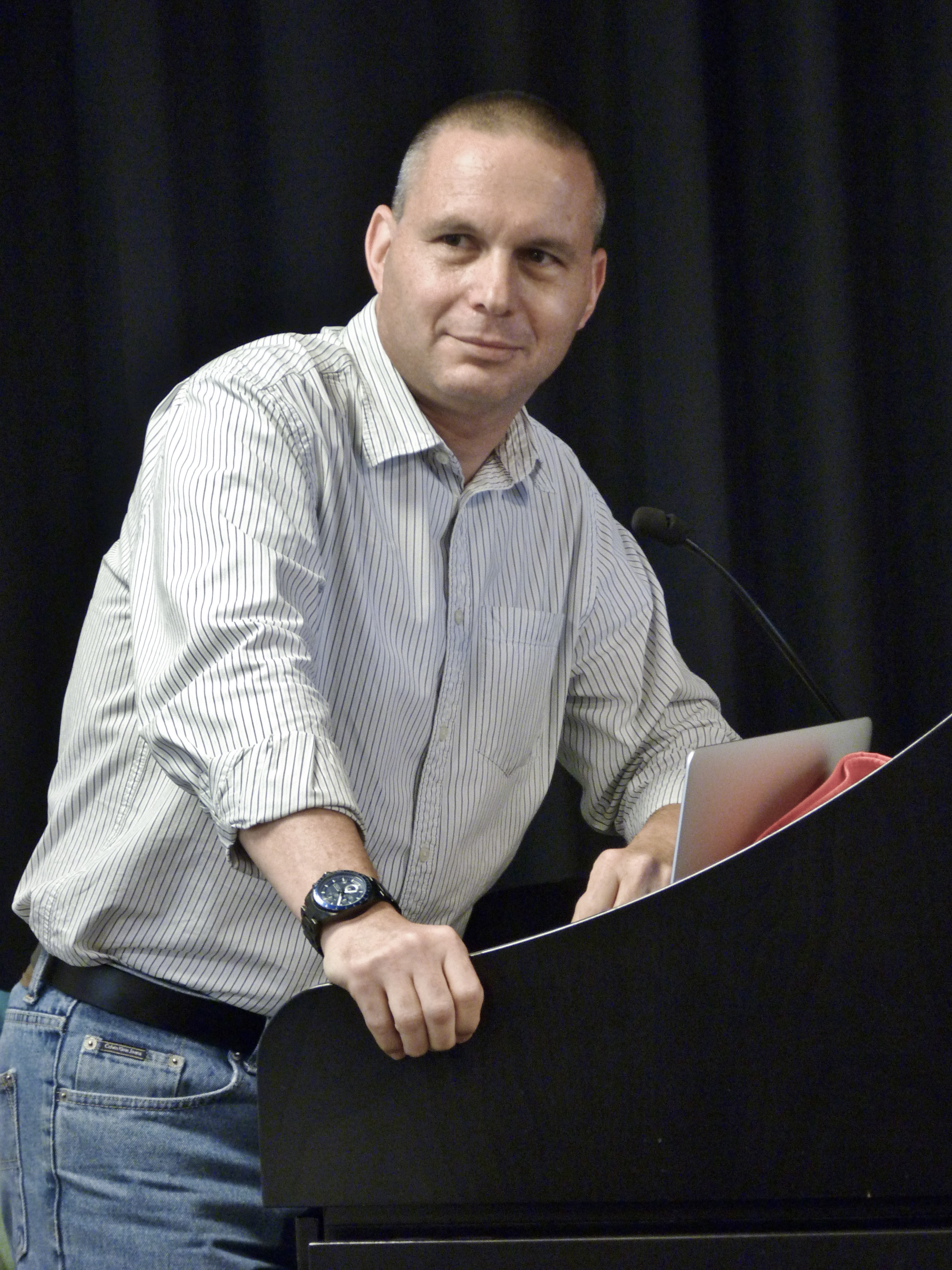
- Shai in 2015

Ministerial roles
- 2020–2021: Minister of Science & Technology

Faction represented in the Knesset
- 2019–2020: Blue and White
- 2021: Blue and White

Personal details
- Born: 16 July 1963 (age 63) Ein HaShlosha, Israel

Yizhar Nitzan Shai (Hebrew: יזהר ניצן שי; born 16 July 1963) is an Israeli entrepreneur, venture capitalist, and politician. He was a member of the Knesset for Blue and White between 2019 and 2021, and as Minister of Science & Technology from 2020 to 2021.

== Early life and career ==
Shai was born in kibbutz Ein HaShlosha to parents from Argentina. His family moved to Jerusalem in the mid-1960s, where he attended the Hebrew Gymnasium school. In 1981 he started his national service in the Israel Defense Forces, joining the Paratroopers Brigade and serving in the 1982 Lebanon War. He left the army in 1985 with the rank of lieutenant. He later gained an electrical engineering certificate from the Technion and subsequently worked in the high-tech sector. He founded Business Layers in 1998, and was CEO until it was sold to Netegrity in 2003. In 2006 he joined Canaan Partners as a partner, working there until 2014 when he established the firm's Israel branch.

Shai founded Start-Up Stadium, Israel's largest organized entrepreneur community.

== Political career ==
Prior to the April 2019 elections he joined the Israel Resilience Party. After the party joined the Blue and White alliance, he was given the twentieth slot on the joint list; he was subsequently elected to the Knesset when the alliance won 35 seats.

His first proposed bill as an MK was to increase Israel's research and development spending to 0.8% of the country's total annual budget, in line with most OECD nations.

He was re-elected in the September 2019 and March 2020 elections. In May 2020 he was appointed Minister of Science and Technology. The following month he resigned from the Knesset under the Norwegian Law and was replaced by Hila Vazan. After resigning from his ministerial role in January 2021, he returned to the Knesset, replacing Ruth Wasserman Lande, who had been an MK for only four days. Prior to the 2021 elections he joined Telem. However, the party did not contest the elections and he lost his seat in the Knesset.

== After politics ==
After leaving politics, Shai joined venture capital fund Disruptive AI as a partner in May 2021 and led the firm's seed investment in Spiritt in May 2022.

Shai is chairman of Israel Acquisitions Corp, a SPAC registered in the Cayman Islands, which announced plans in March 2022 to raise $200 million on the Nasdaq to merge with an Israeli tech company. In January 2023, the SPAC raised $143 million.

Shai and fellow Israeli entrepreneur Eyal Waldman launched project Next October in December 2023, pledging to help create 1,200 next startups in honor of the victims of the October 7 attacks, with each startup bearing the name of someone who was killed. Around 150 companies, including Meta, OurCrowd, and Pitango, were confirmed as partners.

== Personal ==
Shai is married with four children and lives in Kadima-Tzoran. Before entering politics, he was a volunteer with Tzahala: For the Israeli Youth and with Kamatech, which integrates Haredi entrepreneurs into the Israeli high tech industry. He was also on the board of Israel Advanced Technology Industries. His son Yaron Uri Shai, 21, a soldier in the Nahal Brigade of the Israel Defense Forces, was killed in action during the October 7 attack while engaged in combat in the vicinity of kibbutz Kerem Shalom. Days after complaining online that he had not heard from Prime Minister Benjamin Netanyahu after his son Yaron's death, Netanyahu called Shai to express his condolences on 13 June, eight months after the attack.
