= Ram Shefa =

Israeli politician

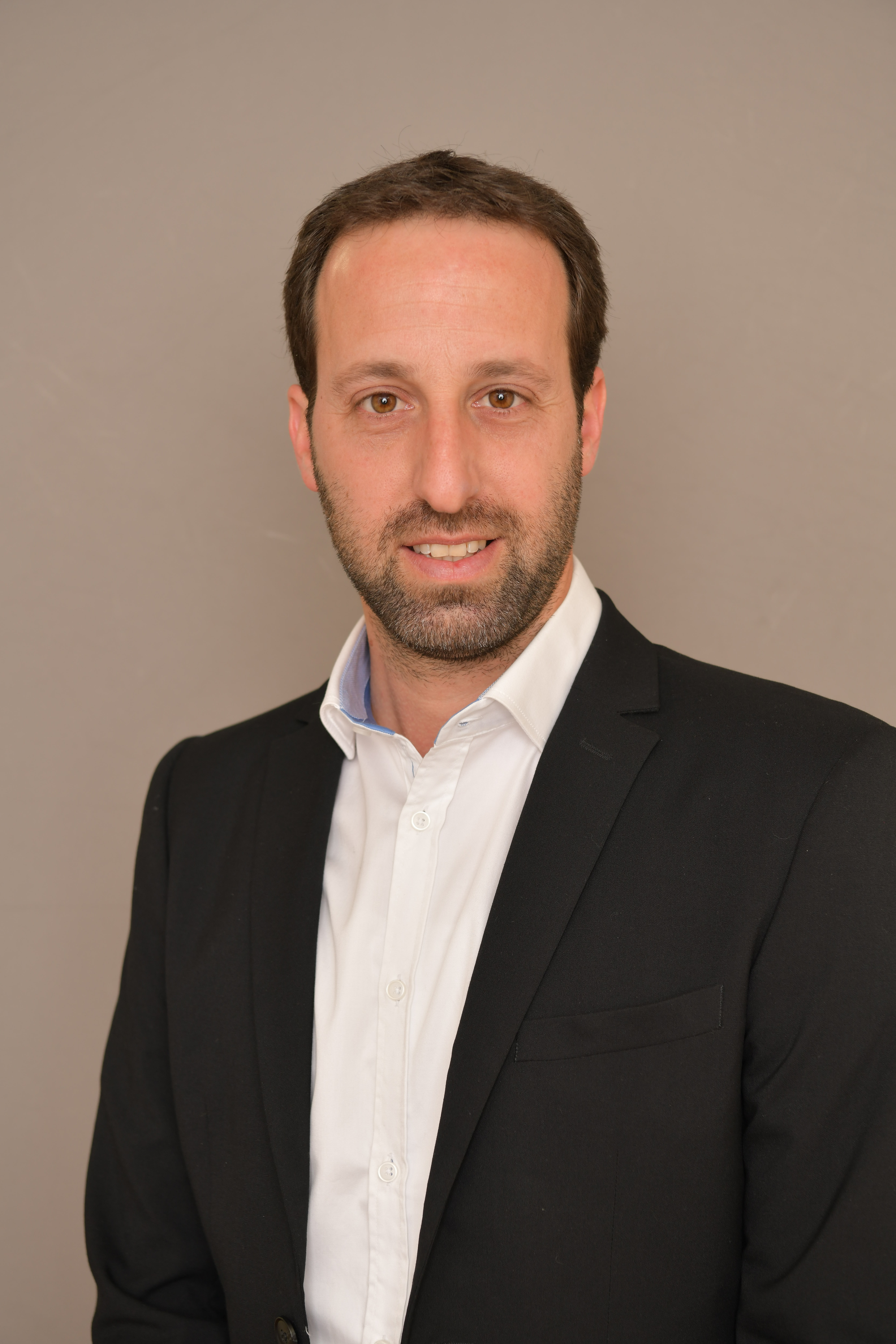
- Shefa in 2019

Faction represented in the Knesset
- 2019–2021: Blue and White
- 2021–2022: Labor Party

Personal details
- Born: 15 February 1985 (age 41) Givat Haim, Israel

Ram Shefa (Hebrew: רָם שֶׁפַע; born 15 February 1985) is an Israeli politician. A former head of the National Union of Israeli Students, he was a member of the Knesset for the Labor Party from 2021 to 2022, having previously been an MK for the Blue and White alliance from 2019 to 2021.

== Biography ==
Shefa was born in kibbutz Givat Haim (Ihud), the son of Gershon, an Olympic swimmer and Tamar, a kindergarten teacher. He attended Maya'an Shahar school, after which he did a Service Year in the Beit HaYeled boarding school in Tel Aviv. In his national service in the Israel Defense Forces he served in the Shaldag Unit. After completing his national service, Shefa moved to the Ein Yahav moshav in the Arava Valley, where he worked in agriculture for a year, before spending six months volunteering abroad for Tevel B'Tzedek. When he returned to Israel, he worked for the Aharei organisation.

In 2012 he began an undergraduate course at the Kibbutzim College, and at the end of the year he was elected head of the college's student union. In 2014 he became deputy chair of the National Union of Israeli Students. In 2016 he started a master's degree course in public policy at Tel Aviv University, and was elected chair of the National Union of Israeli Students.

In February 2019 Shefa resigned from the union and joined the new Israel Resilience Party. After the party became part of the Blue and White alliance, he was given the twenty-ninth slot on the joint list, and was subsequently elected to the Knesset as the alliance won 35 seats. He announced on 25 January 2021 that he had joined the Israeli Labor Party and would run in its primaries, placing sixth. He left the Knesset on 31 January and was replaced by Ruth Wasserman Lande. He was re-elected to the Knesset as the Labor Party won seven seats in the 2021 elections.

For the 2022 elections Shefa was placed fifth on the Labor list, but lost his seat as the party won only four seats.

In The Democrats primary elections held on 20 July 2026, ahead of the 2026 Israeli legislative election, Shefa came in at number seventeen on the slate.

Shefa is married to Efrat Resner, with whom he has a son. The couple live in Givat Haim (Ihud).
