= Mark Ifraimov =

Israeli politician

- מארק איפראימוב
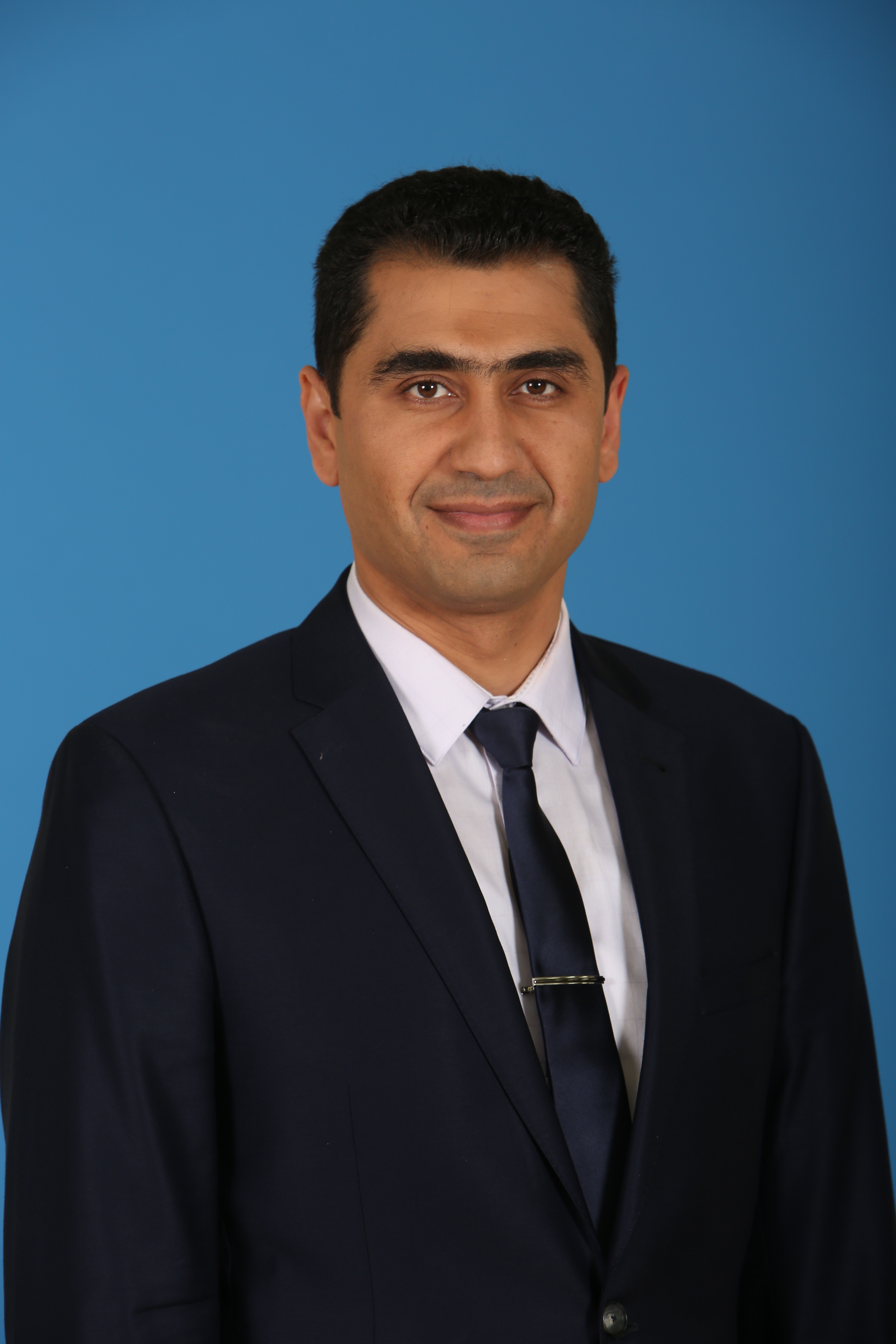

Faction represented in the Knesset
- 2019–2020: Yisrael Beiteinu

Personal details
- Born: 7 February 1981 (age 44); Nalchik, Soviet Union

Mark Ifraimov (Hebrew: מארק איפראימוב; born 7 February 1981) is an Israeli politician who served as a member of the Knesset for Yisrael Beiteinu between 2019 and 2020. He previously served as Deputy Mayor of Sderot from 2013 to 2019.

== Biography ==
Ifraimov was born in the city of Nalchik in the Soviet Union (now in Russia) to a Mountain Jewish family. At the age of 15, he immigrated to Israel alone as part of the Naale program, and studied at Yemin Orde Youth Village in the Carmel.

Between 2004 and 2008, Ifraimov was a youth coordinator for Elam's youth-at-risk program. He then ran the Generation Association for Young Mountain Jews until 2013. At the same time, he managed the Crime Prevention Department at the Ministry of Public Security. He headed the Sderot Beiteinu party, becoming deputy mayor of Sderot in 2013.

In the run-up to September 2019 Knesset elections, he was placed eighth on the Yisrael Beiteinu list and was elected to the Knesset as the party won eight seats. He was placed eighth again for the 2020 elections, losing his seat as Yisrael Beiteinu was reduced to seven seats.

Ifraimov is married to Sofia, who also immigrated to Israel from Nalchik. The couple have two children and live in Sderot.
