= Matti Yogev =

Israeli politician

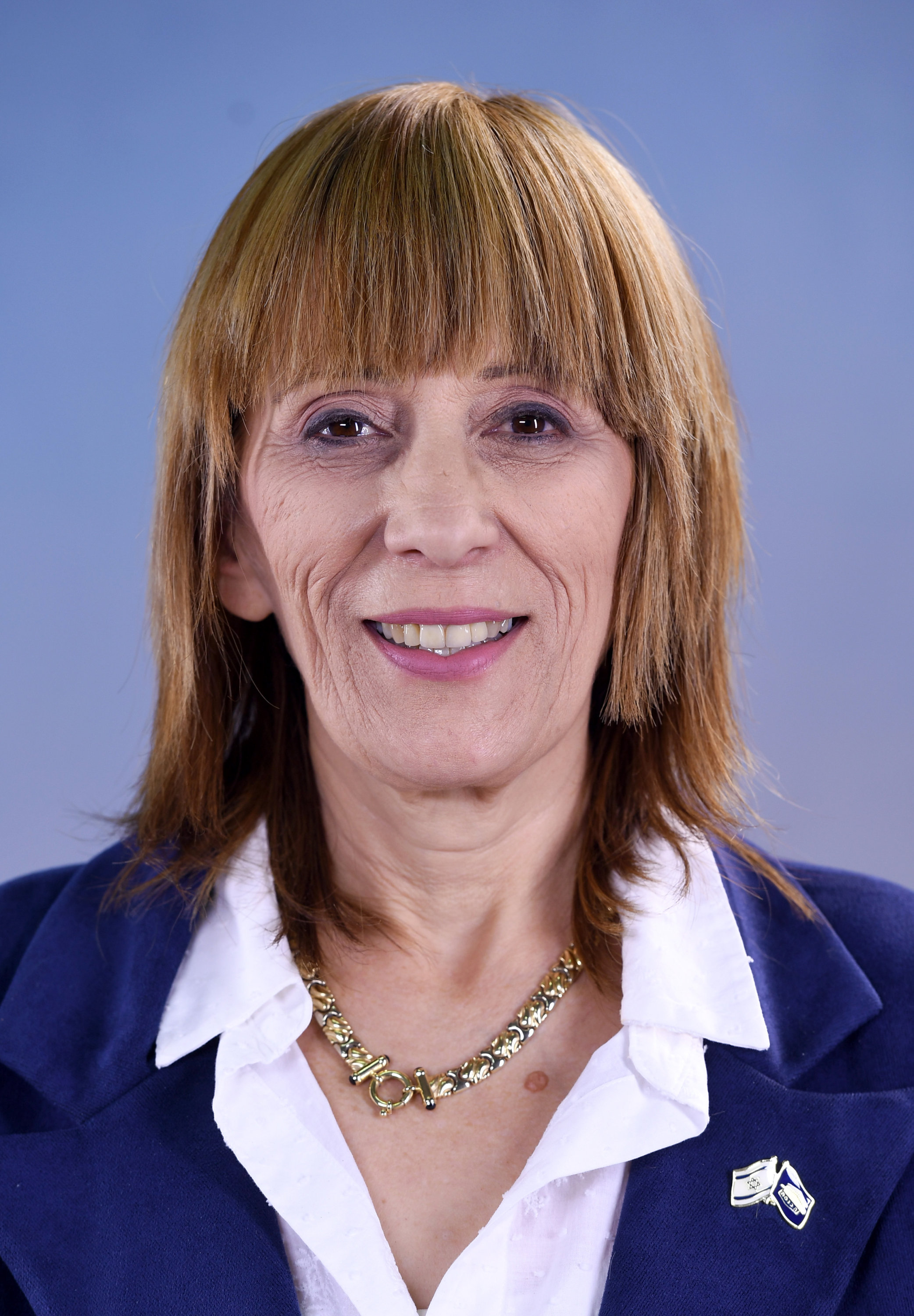
- Yogev in 2021

Faction represented in the Knesset
- 2020–2021: Likud

Personal details
- Born: 22 September 1966 (age 59)

Martine "Matti" Yogev (Hebrew: מטי יוגב; born 22 September 1966) is an Israeli politician. She served as a member of the Knesset for Likud between 2020 and 2021.

== Biography ==
Yogev was educated at the ORT School in Ramat Gan and subsequently studied at the Open University. She was elected to Hefer Valley Regional Council in 2003 and later became a member of Kadima, heading its women's headquarters. Prior to the 2013 Knesset elections she was placed eleventh on the Kadima list, but the party won only two seats.

Having left Kadima to join Likud, she was placed forty-first on its list for the April 2019 elections, but the party won only 35 seats. She was placed forty-third for the September 2019 elections, in which Likud won 32 seats. Although she missed out again in the March 2020 elections in which she was placed forty-third and Likud won 36 seats, she entered the Knesset in December 2020 as a replacement for Ze'ev Elkin, who had resigned to join Gideon Sa'ar's New Hope party. Placed forty-second on the Likud list for the March 2021 elections, she lost her seat as Likud was reduced to 30 seats.
