= Einav Kabla =

Israeli lawyer and politician

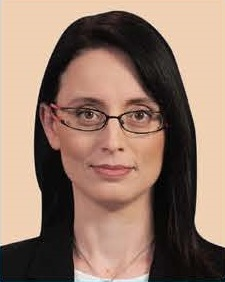
- Kabla in the early 2020s

Faction represented in the Knesset
- 2020–2021: Blue and White

Personal details
- Born: 27 September 1979 (age 45); Ashkelon, Israel

Einav Kabla (Hebrew: עינב קאבלה; born 27 September 1979) is an Israeli lawyer and politician. She served as a member of the Knesset for the Blue and White alliance.

== Biography ==
Kabla earned a master's degree in law at Bar-Ilan University and specialised in labour relations and pensions. She worked for Minister of Justice Avi Nissenkorn, before becoming director of the Trade Union division of the Histadrut.

Prior to the April 2019 elections Kabla joined the new Israel Resilience Party. When it became part of the Blue and White alliance she was placed thirty-seventh on its list, but the party won only 35 seats. She was given the same spot for the September 2019 elections, again failing to win a seat. Given the thirty-seventh slot again for the March 2020 elections, she again failed to win a seat, but entered the Knesset on 19 June as a replacement for Asaf Zamir, who had resigned his seat under the Norwegian Law after being appointed to the cabinet. However, she left Blue and White to join Ron Huldai's new party ('The Israelis') and resigned from the Knesset in January 2021, with her seat taken by Moshe Tur-Paz. Huldai's party did not contest the 2021 Knesset elections.
