= Anat Knafo =

Israeli politician (born 1963)

- ענת כנפו
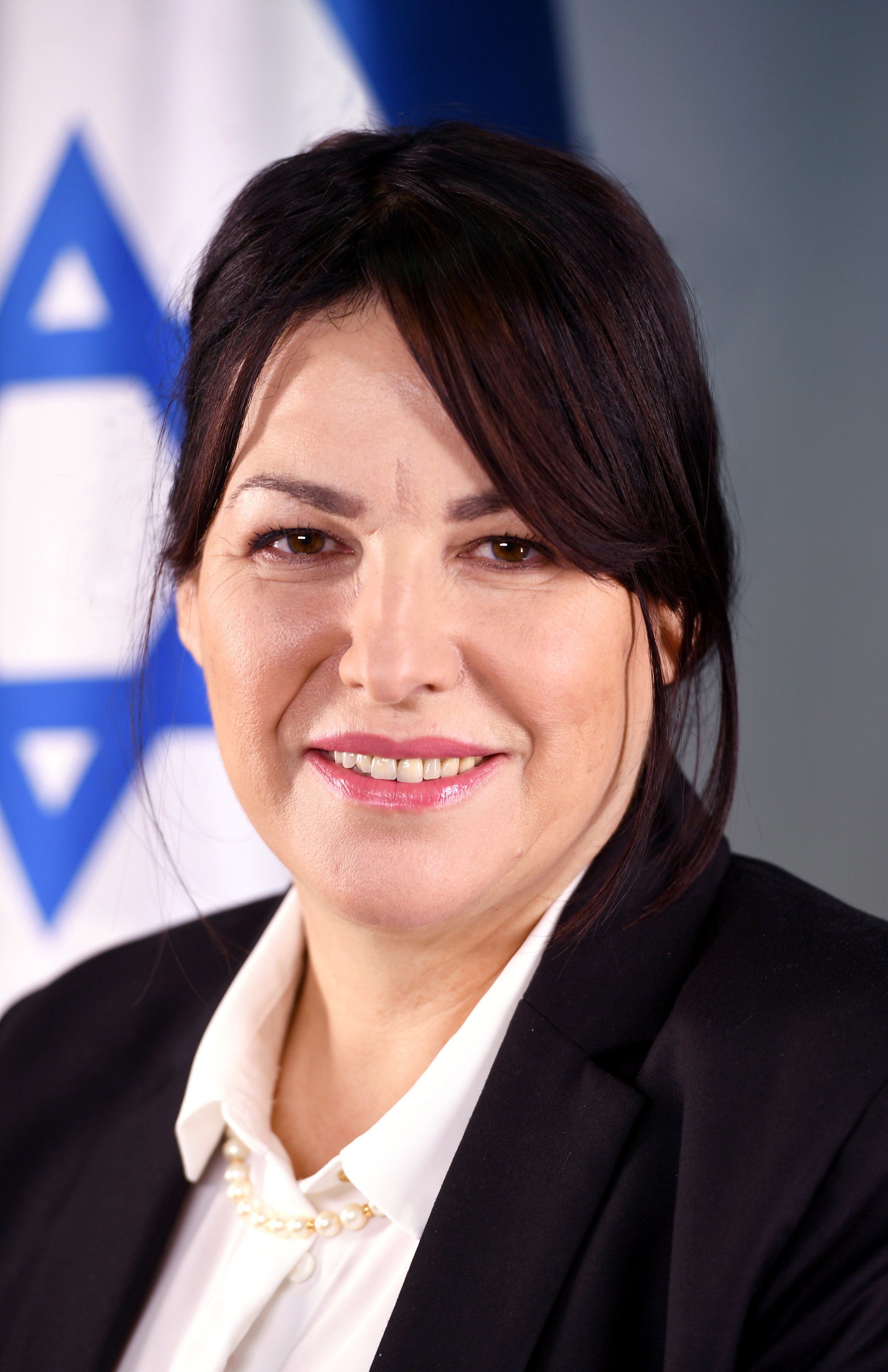
- Knafo in 2021

Faction represented in the Knesset
- 2021: Yesh Atid

Personal details
- Born: 3 September 1963 (age 61); Israel

Anat Knafo (Hebrew: ענת כנפו; born 3 September 1963) is an Israeli politician. She briefly served as a member of the Knesset for Yesh Atid in 2021.

== Biography ==
Knafo grew up in Jerusalem and earned a BEd at David Yellin College of Education. She moved to the Israeli settlement of Har Adar in 2005, and was elected to its council in 2008, receiving around 35% of the vote. She was re-elected in 2013 with 45% of the vote.

She joined the centrist Yesh Atid party, and after it joined the Blue and White alliance prior to the April 2019 elections, was placed forty-seventh on the alliance's list. However, it won only 35 seats. She was given the forty-fourth spot for the September 2019 elections, again failing to win a seat. Given forty-fourth place again for the March 2020 elections, she failed to win a seat but entered the Knesset on 2 February 2021 as a replacement for Hila Vazan. She did not run for re-election in the March 2021 elections.

Knafo is married, with four children.
