= Uri Maklev =

Israeli politician

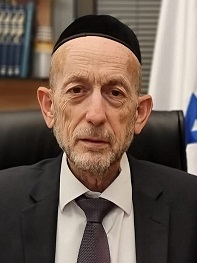
- Maklev in 2021

Faction represented in the Knesset
- 2008: United Torah Judaism
- 2008–2009: Degel HaTorah
- 2009–2019: United Torah Judaism
- 2019: Degel HaTorah
- 2019–2020: United Torah Judaism
- 2021: United Torah Judaism
- 2022–2023: United Torah Judaism
- 2025–2026: United Torah Judaism

Other roles
- 1993–2008: Deputy Mayor of Jerusalem

Personal details
- Born: 10 January 1957 (age 69) Bnei Brak, Israel
- Party: Degel HaTorah
- Spouse: Hannah Maklev
- Children: 5
- Education: Kol Torah

Rabbi Yisrael Meir Uri Maklev (Hebrew: יִשְׂרָאֵל מֵאִיר אוּרִי מַקְלֵב; born 10 January 1957) is an Ashkenazi Israeli politician. He served as a member of the Knesset for the Haredi party Degel HaTorah, which, together with Agudat Yisrael, forms the United Torah Judaism list. He also served as Deputy Minister of Transportation and Road Safety.

== Biography ==
Maklev, a graduate of both Kol HaTorah Yeshiva and Ponivezh Yeshiva, served as a member of Jerusalem City Council and as Deputy Mayor of Jerusalem from 1993 to 2008. In this position, he was a member of the municipality's executive, holding the education portfolio and sitting on the finance and education committees. He was also a member of the local planning and construction committee, and the municipality's representative to Jerusalem's Sewage and Water Corporation.

On 31 July 2008, Maklev entered the Knesset on the basis of an internal party rotation agreement. Upon his entry, Degel HaTorah had three seats for the first time in its history. He retained his seat in the 2009 elections, after being placed fourth on the alliance's list. He was attacked in Mea Shearim on 24 June 2010 as he emerged from a synagogue. He and Moshe Gafni had paid a visit to the Slonim rabbi, who lives in that neighborhood, and then entered a synagogue to pray. When they emerged, they were set upon by young extremists from Neturei Karta who spat at them and assaulted them with stones, blows, and a chair.

He was re-elected in 2013, 2015, April 2019, 2019, and 2020. In May 2020, he was appointed Deputy Minister of Transportation and Road Safety. He subsequently resigned from the Knesset under the Norwegian Law, and was replaced by Eliyahu Baruchi. He resigned from the cabinet position and returned to the Knesset in July 2025.

Maklev will not be included on the party's slate ahead of the 2026 Israeli legislative election.

He is married, with five children, and lives in Jerusalem.
