= Eliyahu Baruchi =

Israeli rabbi and politician (born 1976)

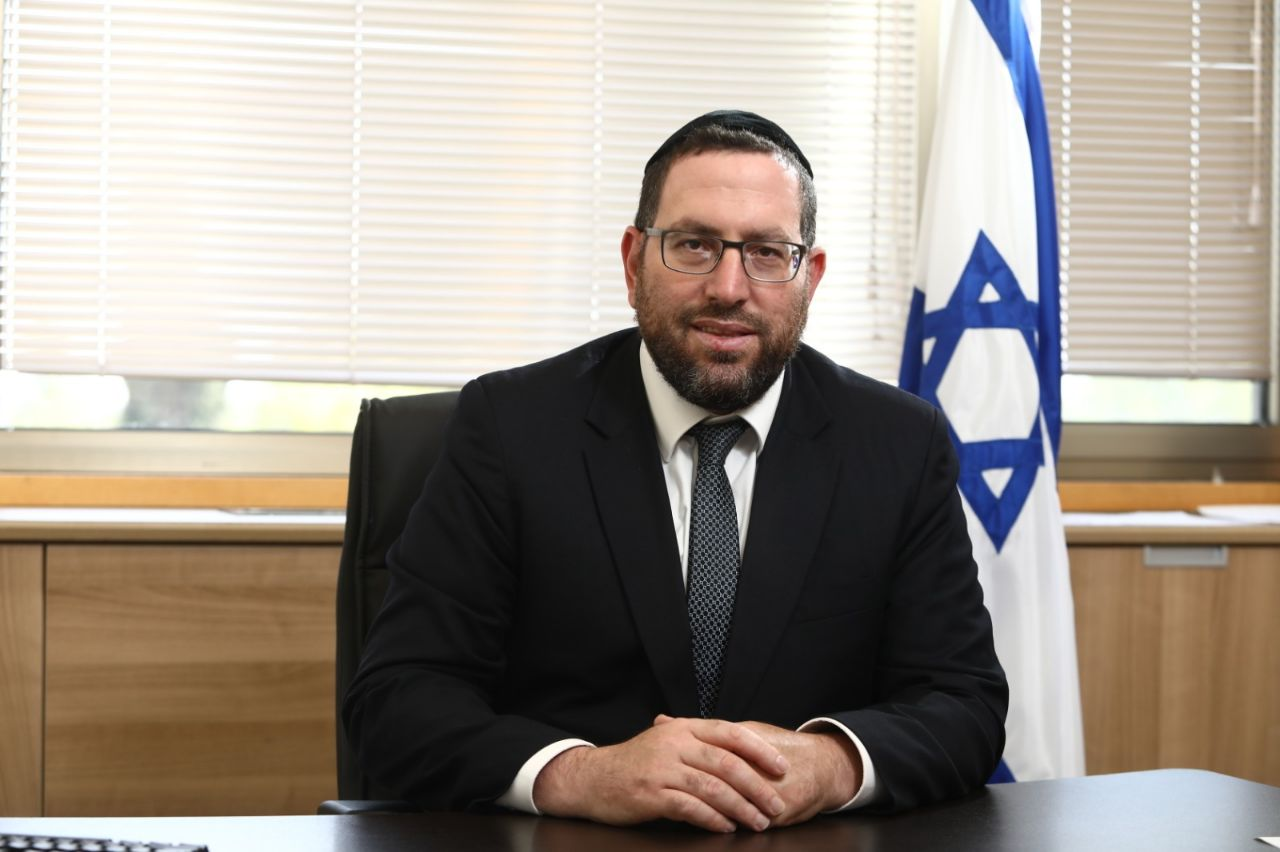
- Baruchi in 2020

Faction represented in the Knesset
- 2020: United Torah Judaism
- 2020–2021: United Torah Judaism
- 2021: United Torah Judaism
- 2023–2025: United Torah Judaism
- 2025: United Torah Judaism

Personal details
- Born: 22 January 1976 (age 50) Jerusalem, Israel

Eliyahu Baruchi (Hebrew: אֵלִיָּהוּ בָּרוּכִי; born 22 January 1976) is an Israeli Haredi rabbi and politician who served several terms between 2020 and 2025 as a member of the Knesset for the United Torah Judaism alliance.

== Biography ==
Baruchi was born in Jerusalem, and studied at the Torah yeshiva in the city. After marrying, he studied at Kollel Abraham in Herzliya and Petah Tikva. In 2008 he was appointed chair of the Petah Tikva branch of Degel HaTorah. He was elected onto Petah Tikva city council and became deputy mayor.

He was placed tenth on the United Torah Judaism list for the April 2019 election, but UTJ won only eight seats. He was placed tenth again for the September 2019 election, in which UTJ were reduced to seven seats. Although he missed out again in the March 2020 election in which he retained the tenth slot and UTJ again won seven seats, he entered the Knesset on 24 June 2020 as a replacement for Uri Maklev, who had resigned his seat under the Norwegian Law after being appointed to the cabinet. He left the Knesset on 15 September 2020 when Yaakov Litzman returned after resigning from the cabinet, but re-entered it on 14 October as a replacement for Eliyahu Hasid. He was placed ninth on the UTJ list for the 2021 election, losing his seat as the alliance won seven seats. He regained his seat when Uri Maklev resigned his own seat under the Norwegian Law, but left the Knesset again in June when a new government was formed without United Torah Judaism and Maklev returned to the Knesset.

Baruchi was placed ninth on the UTJ list for the 2022 election, and returned to the Knesset on 25 January 2023 under the Norwegian Law. He left the Knesset in June 2025 following Yitzhak Goldknopf's resignation from the Kneset under the Norwegian Law.

He rejoined the Knesset in July 2025, replacing Ya'akov Tessler. Several weeks later, he left the Knesset and was replaced by Uri Maklev.
