= Shevah Stern =

Israeli politician

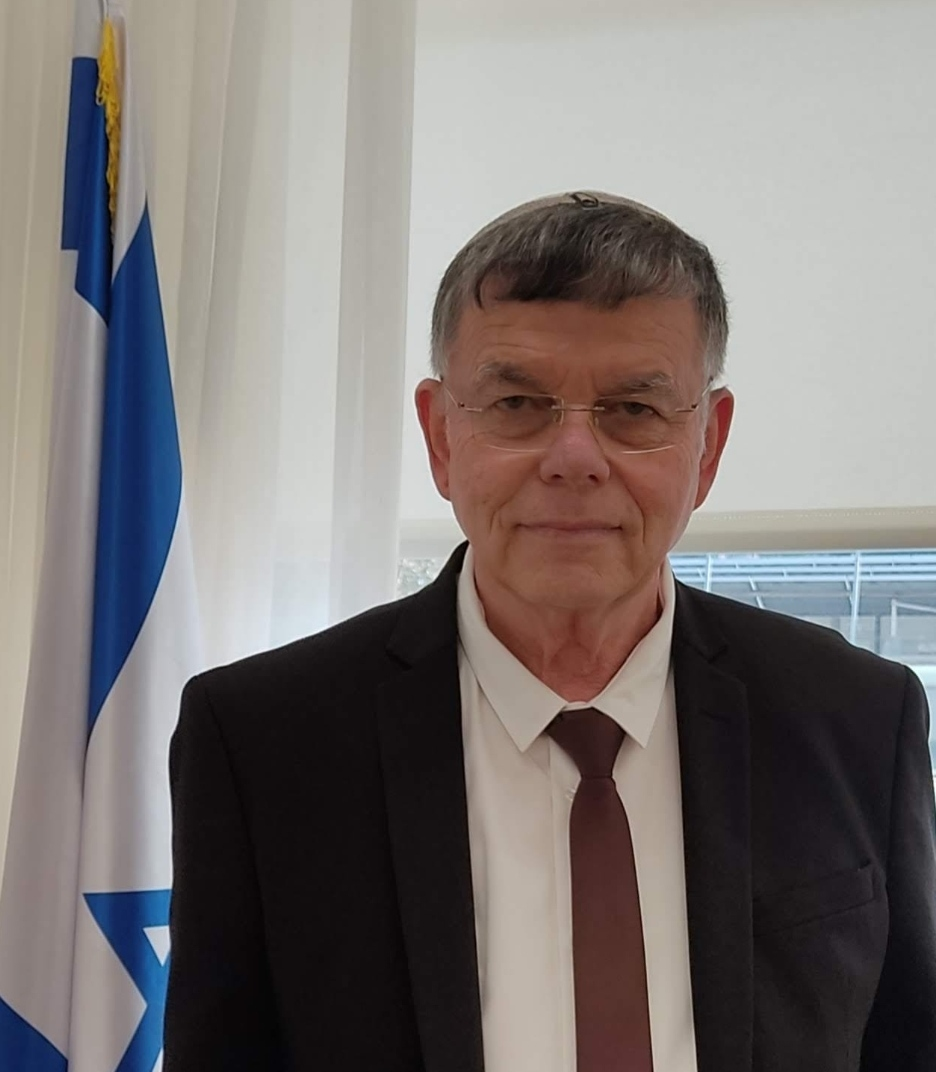
- Stern in 2020

Faction represented in the Knesset
- 2020–2021: Likud

Personal details
- Born: 23 April 1951 (age 74)

Shevah Stern (Hebrew: שבח שטרן; born 23 April 1951) is an Israeli politician. He served as a member of the Knesset for Likud from 2020 to 2021.

== Biography ==
Stern grew up in Safed. During his national service in the Israel Defence Forces, he served in the 50th battalion of the Nahal Brigade. He subsequently earned a bachelor's degree in physics from Bar-Ilan University. One of the founders of the West Bank settlement movement, he moved to the settlement of Shilo when it was founded in 1978. He also served as a director of the Amana settlement movement. He worked as the manager of a software companies he owns.

He joined Likud and became a member of its party centre. Prior to the 2015 Knesset elections he was given the thirty-eighth place on the Likud list, but failed to win a seat. He was placed thirty-eighth on the Likud list for the April 2019 elections, but the party won only 35 seats. He was placed forty-first for the September 2019 elections, in which Likud won 32 seats. Although he missed out again in the March 2020 elections in which he was placed forty-first and Likud won 36 seats, he entered the Knesset in December 2020 as a replacement for Michal Shir, who had resigned to join Gideon Sa'ar's New Hope party. Placed thirty-eighth on the Likud list for the March 2021 elections, he lost his seat as Likud was reduced to 30 seats.
