= Eliyahu Hasid =

Israeli rabbi and politician

- אליהו חסיד
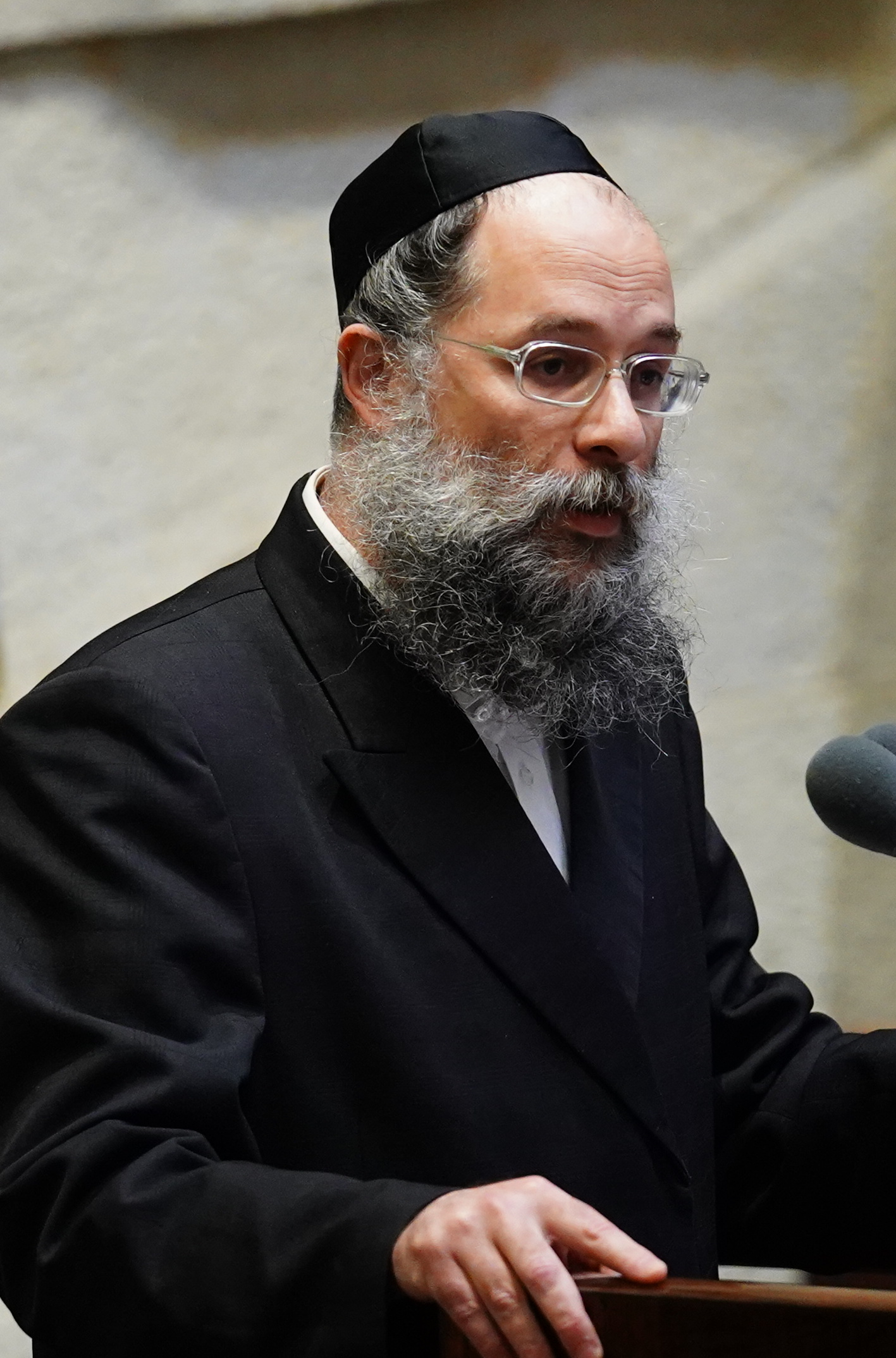

Faction represented in the Knesset
- 2020: United Torah Judaism

Personal details
- Born: 12 November 1976 (age 49) Bnei Brak, Israel

Rabbi Eliyahu Hasid (Hebrew: אליהו חסיד; born 12 November 1976) is an Israeli politician. He briefly served as a member of the Knesset for the United Torah Judaism alliance in 2020.

== Biography ==
Hasid was placed ninth on the United Torah Judaism list for the April 2019 elections, and UTJ won eight seats. He was placed ninth again for the September 2019 elections, in which UTJ were reduced to seven seats. He missed out again in the March 2020 elections, in which he retained ninth place and UTJ again won seven seats, he entered the Knesset on 24 June 2020 as a replacement for Yaakov Litzman, who had resigned his seat under the Norwegian Law after being appointed to the cabinet. He resigned from the Knesset in October 2020 to allow Eliyahu Baruchi to take his seat.
