= 2021 Israeli legislative election =

- 23 March 2021
- All 120 seats in the Knesset; 61 seats needed for a majority
- Turnout: 67.44% (▼4.08pp)
Party	Leader	Vote %	Seats	+/–
Likud	Benjamin Netanyahu	24.19	30	−7
Yesh Atid	Yair Lapid	13.93	17	+4
Shas	Aryeh Deri	7.17	9	0
Blue and White	Benny Gantz	6.63	8	−7
Yamina	Naftali Bennett	6.21	7	+4
Labor	Merav Michaeli	6.09	7	+4
UTJ	Moshe Gafni	5.63	7	0
Yisrael Beiteinu	Avigdor Lieberman	5.63	7	0
Religious Zionist	Bezalel Smotrich	5.12	6	+4
Joint List	Ayman Odeh	4.82	6	−5
New Hope	Gideon Sa'ar	4.74	6	New
Meretz	Nitzan Horowitz	4.59	6	+3
Ra'am	Mansour Abbas	3.79	4	0
This lists parties that won seats. See the complete results below.
Prime Minister before	Prime Minister after
Benjamin Netanyahu; Likud (35th)	Naftali Bennett; Yamina (36th)

Legislative elections were held in Israel on 23 March 2021 to elect the 120 members of the 24th Knesset. It was the fourth Knesset election in two years, amidst the continued political deadlock following the previous three elections in April 2019, September 2019 and 2020. Yair Lapid and Naftali Bennett announced that they had formed a rotation government on 2 June 2021, which was approved on 13 June 2021.

== Background ==
According to the coalition agreement signed between Likud and Blue and White in 2020, elections were to be held 36 months after the swearing-in of the 35th government, making 23 May 2023 the last possible election date. However, Israeli law stipulates that if the 2020 state budget was not passed by 23 December 2020, the Knesset would be dissolved, and elections would be held by 23 March 2021.

On 2 December 2020, the Knesset passed the preliminary reading of a bill to dissolve the current government by a vote of 61–54. On 21 December 2020, the Knesset failed to pass a bill to avoid dispersal by a vote of 47–49. Since the Knesset had failed to approve the 2020 state budget by the required deadline, at midnight IST on 23 December 2020, the government coalition collapsed, and the 23rd Knesset was officially dissolved. In accordance with the law that the election must be held within 90 days after the dissolution of the Knesset, the date for elections to the 24th Knesset was automatically set for 23 March 2021. Netanyahu was reported as facing a strong challenge from opposition parties.

== Electoral system ==
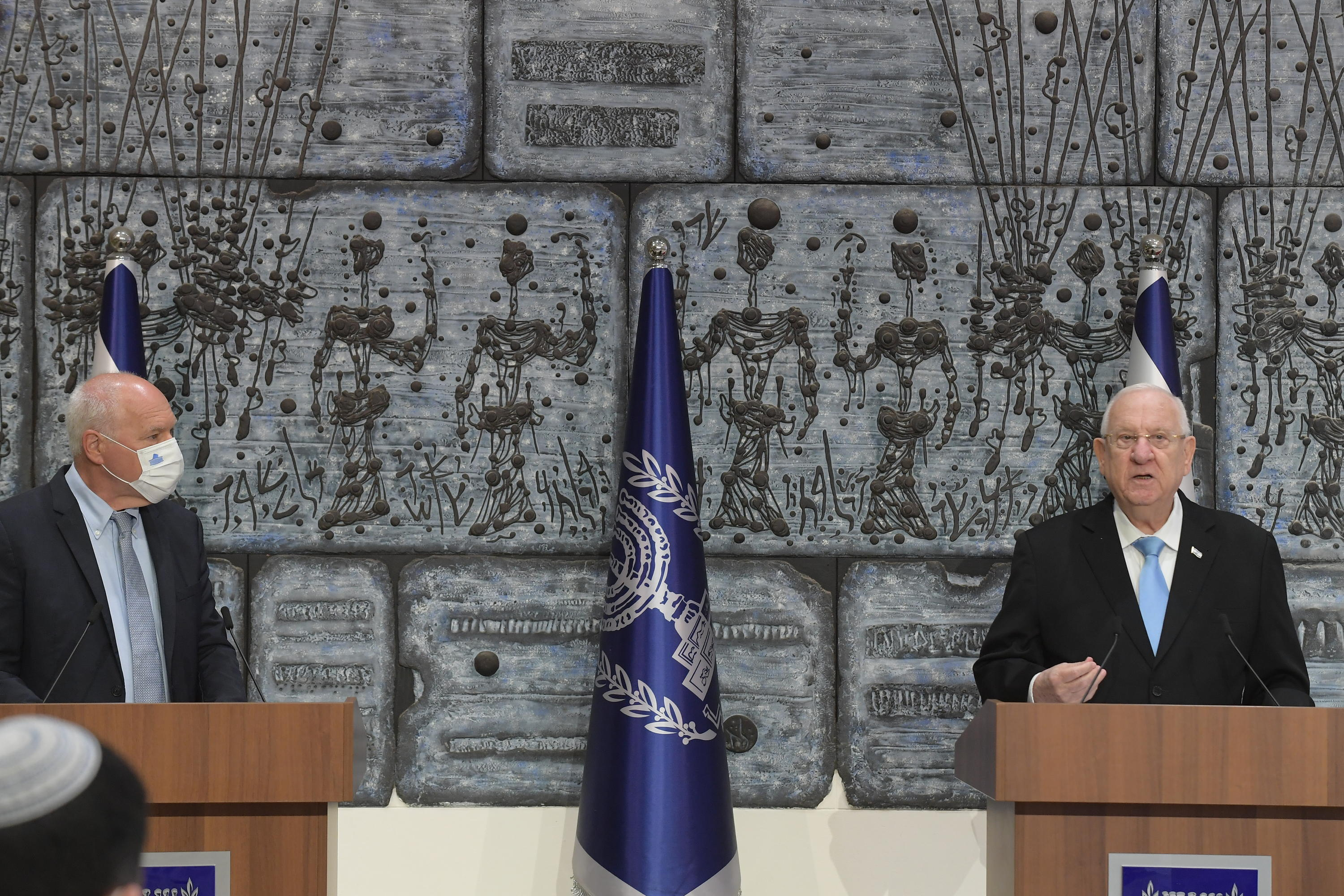
Israeli President, Reuven Rivlin, receiving the official results of the elections from Israel Supreme court justice Uzi Vogelman. In the background, is an Israeli volcanic ash relief made of basalt

The 120 seats in the Knesset were elected by closed list proportional representation in a single nationwide constituency. The electoral threshold for this election was 3.25%.

=== Surplus-vote agreements ===
Two parties could sign a surplus-vote agreement that allowed them to compete for leftover seats as if they were running together on the same lis]. The Bader–Ofer method slightly favours larger lists, meaning that alliances are more likely to receive leftover seats than parties would be individually. If the alliance receives leftover seats, the Bader–Ofer calculation is applied privately, to determine how the seats are divided among the two allied lists.

The following parties signed surplus vote-sharing agreements for the 2021 election:

- Yamina and New Hope
- Yesh Atid and Yisrael Beiteinu
- Blue and White and New Economic Party
- Likud and Religious Zionist Party
- Israeli Labor Party and Meretz
- Shas and United Torah Judaism

== Campaign ==
Leadership elections were held by some parties to determine party leadership ahead of the election. Primary elections were held by some parties in advance of the national election to determine the composition of their party list.

=== Balad ===
Knesset MK Sami Abu Shehadeh announced on 14 January 2021 that he would run for the leadership of Balad. MK and former leader Mtanes Shehadeh sought re-election. The party held primaries on 23 January 2021 for its leader and its list for Knesset. The Balad council, which consists of a total of 600 members, were eligible to vote in Nazareth. Abu Shehadeh was elected party leader by the Central Committee, with a total of 230 votes.

=== Green Party ===
Stav Shaffir was re-elected as the head of Green Party on 29 January 2021.

=== Jewish Home ===
On 5 January, incumbent Jewish Home party leader Rafi Peretz stated that he would not head the party and would not stand for re-election, but did not rule out a return to politics in the future. Nir Orbach announced he would run for the leadership slot. Hagit Moshe also ran (at Netanyahu's request). The party's Central Committee selected its chair and party list, rather than holding a vote amongst party members. Moshe was elected party leader by the Central Committee on 19 January 2021. Party primaries were held on 26 January.

=== Labor ===
The Tel Aviv District Court ruled on 3 January 2021 that primaries for Labor's Knesset list and leadership must take place, despite the fact that Amir Peretz and his supporters voted in favor of canceling them. MK Merav Michaeli announced she would run for party leadership shortly after. Gil Beilin announced he would run on 11 January. The Israeli High Court rejected an appeal by the Labor party, ensuring that all party members (instead of just committee members) will be able to vote in the primary. Former Labor leader Ehud Barak announced on 18 January that he would not run, while Itzik Shmuli announced the next day that he would not run. Avi Shaked and David Landsman, Ethiopian immigrant Yitzhak Time, and Na'ava Katz also ran.

The vote for party leader was won by Michaeli on 24 January.

The deadline for entering the Knesset primary was extended to 30 January; 59 candidates entered the race. The primary election for choosing the Knesset slate took place 1 February.

=== Likud ===
The Likud was ordered by its internal court to have its Constitutional Committee meet by 30 December to begin preparations for the selection of candidates for its electoral slate, following a petition filed by members of the party's Central Committee. The party's Constitution Committee voted on 30 December to cancel party primaries, which was made official on 2 January 2021.

=== Meretz ===
Meretz would have held a leadership election on 13 January 2021, while a primary for the rest of its electoral list would have been held on 21 January. However, the party decided on 3 January 2021 to not hold primaries as no one challenged Nitzan Horowitz, the party leader.

== Parties ==
=== Parliamentary factions ===
At the end of the 23rd Knesset, there were thirteen factions in parliament. The parties of these parliamentary factions are all fielding lists to compete in the 2021 elections, or are members of such lists, with the exception of The Jewish Home.

Name	Ideology	Symbol	Primary demographic	Leader	2020 result		At the time of dissolution
Name	Ideology	Symbol	Primary demographic	Leader	Votes (%)	Seats	At the time of dissolution
Likud	Conservatism	מחל	–	Benjamin Netanyahu	29.46%	36 / 120	36 / 120
Yesh Atid–Telem	Liberalism	פה	–	Yair Lapid, Moshe Ya'alon	26.59%	18 / 120	16 / 120
Blue and White	Liberalism	פה	–	Benny Gantz	26.59%	15 / 120	15 / 120
Derekh Eretz	Liberal conservatism	פה	–	Yoaz Hendel, Zvi Hauser	26.59%		2 / 120
Joint List	Minority interests	ודעם	Israeli Arabs	Ayman Odeh	12.67%	15 / 120	15 / 120
Shas	Religious conservatism	שס	Sephardi and Mizrahi Haredim	Aryeh Deri	7.69%	9 / 120	9 / 120
United Torah Judaism	Religious conservatism	ג	Ashkenazi Haredim	Yaakov Litzman	5.98%	7 / 120	7 / 120
Labor	Social democracy	אמת	–	Amir Peretz	5.83%	3 / 120	3 / 120
Meretz	Progressivism	אמת	–	Nitzan Horowitz	5.83%	3 / 120	3 / 120
Gesher	Social liberalism	אמת	–	Orly Levy	5.83%	1 / 120	1 / 120
Yisrael Beiteinu	Right-wing nationalism Secularism	ל	Russian-speakers	Avigdor Lieberman	5.74%	7 / 120	7 / 120
Yamina	National conservatism	טב	–	Naftali Bennett	5.24%	5 / 120	5 / 120
Jewish Home	Religious Zionism	טב	Israeli settlers, Modern Orthodox and Hardal Jews	Rafi Peretz	5.24%	1 / 120	1 / 120

=== Contesting parties ===
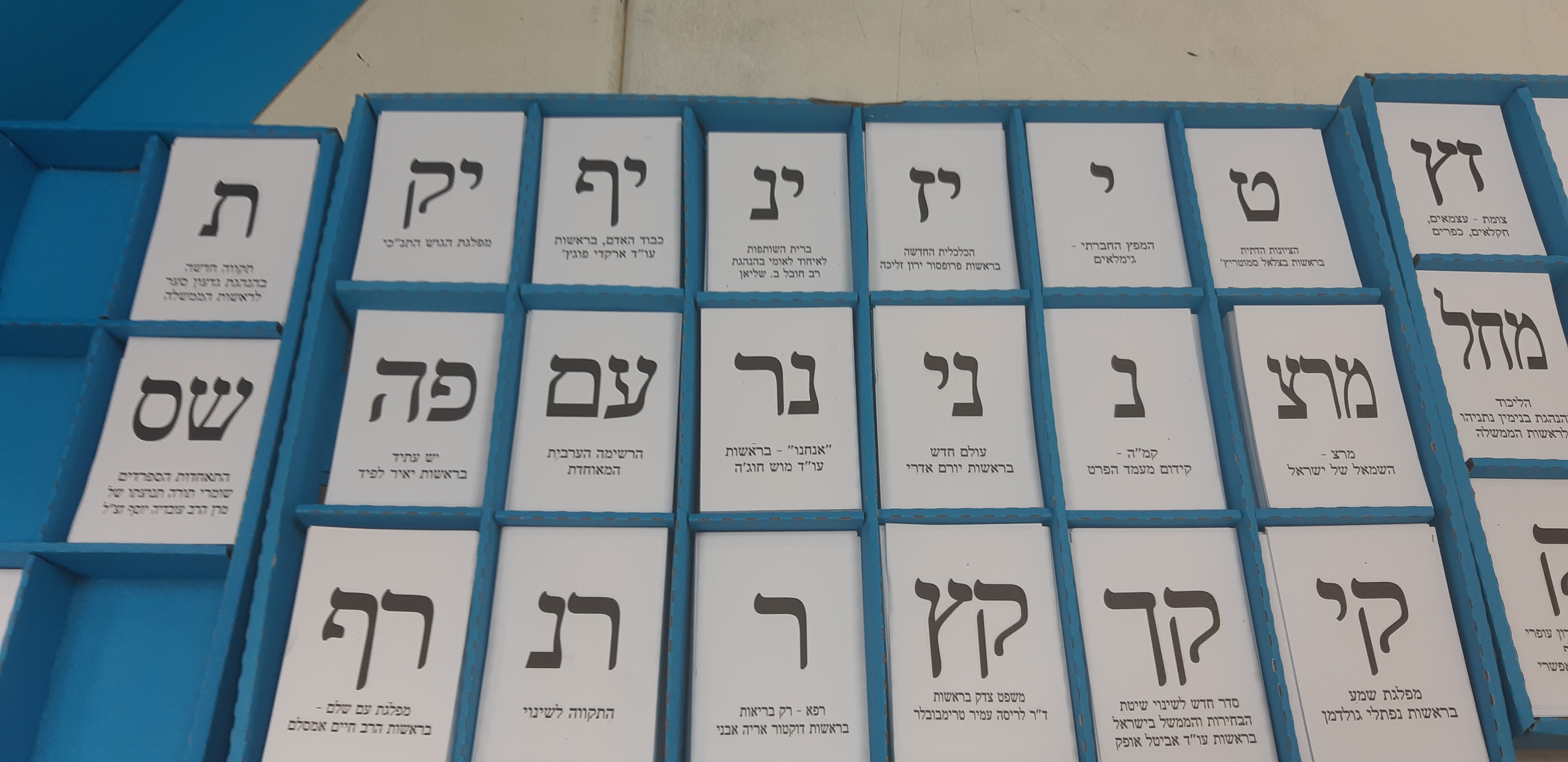
Some of the ballot papers in the election.

A total of 39 parties registered to contest the elections.

Party or alliance	Head of list	Hebrew ballot letter	Arabic ballot letter
Am Shalem	Haim Amsalem	רף	ر ف
Blue and White	Benny Gantz	כן	ك ن
Bible Bloc	Dennis Lipkin	יק	ي ق
Common Alliance	Bishara Shlian	ינ	ي ن
Da'am Workers Party	Yoav Gal Tamir	ץ	ص
Democratic Party (withdrawn)	Haim Cohen	רק	ر ض
The Israelis	Yaron Regev	ז	ز
Hetz	Lior Shapira	צף	ص ف
Hope for Change	Abd el-Karim Abucaf	רנ	ر ن
Human Dignity	Arkadi Pogech	יף	ي ف
Israeli Labor Party	Merav Michaeli	אמת	أ م ت
Jewish Heart	Eli Yosef	כ	ك
Likud	Benjamin Netanyahu	מחל	م ح ل
Joint List	Ayman Odeh	ודעם	و ض ع م
Kama	Dorit Liat Biran	נ	ن
Ma'an (withdrawn)	Mohammed Darawshe	צכ	ص ك
Me and You	Alon Giladi	כך	ك خ
Meretz	Nitzan Horowitz	מרצ	م ر ص
Mishpat Tzedek	Larissa Amir	קץ	ق ص
New Economic Party	Yaron Zelekha	יז	ي ز
New Hope	Gideon Sa'ar	ת	ت
New Order	Avital Ofek	קך	ق خ
New World	Yoram Edri	ני	ن ي
Atzmeinu (withdrawn)	Dotan Sofer	צי	ص ي
The Impossible – Possible	Noam Aryeh Coleman	ק	ق
Pirate Party	Ohad Shem Tov	ףז	ف ز
Rapeh only Health	Aryeh Avni	ר	ر
Religious Zionist Party	Bezalel Smotrich	ט	ط
Shas	Aryeh Deri	שס	ش س
Shama	Naftali Baruch Goldman	קי	ق ي
Social Bang – Pensioners	Tzion Yahav	י	ي
Social Leadership	Ilan Yar-Zanber	יר	ي ر
Tzomet	Moshe Green	זץ	ز ص
Ra'am	Mansour Abbas	עם	ع م
United Torah Judaism	Moshe Gafni	ג	ج
Us	Mosh Huga	נר	ن ر
Yamina	Naftali Bennett	ב	ب
Yesh Atid	Yair Lapid	פה	ف ه
Yisrael Beiteinu	Avigdor Lieberman	ל	ل

=== Public expression of interest ===
The following parties, which did not have representation in the Knesset prior to the election, expressed interest in participating in the 2021 election, but ultimately chose not to contest it:

- Or HaShahar, founded by former Labor MK and Haifa mayor Yona Yahav
- Unity Party, founded by former Labor MK Michael Bar-Zohar

=== Not running ===
- The Israelis, a party founded by Tel Aviv mayor Ron Huldai, dropped out of the race on 4 February 2021.
- The Israeli Veterans Party dropped out of the race on 3 February 2021 and has endorsed Yesh Atid.
- The Jewish Home dropped out of the race on 4 February 2021 and has endorsed Yamina.
- Telem dropped out of the race on 1 February 2021.
- Tnufa, a party founded by former Yesh Atid MK Ofer Shelah, dropped out of the race on 4 February 2021.
- Zehut announced on 24 December 2020 that the party would not run in the election.

== Opinion polls ==
This graph shows the polling trends from the 2 March 2020 Israeli legislative election. Scenario polls are not included here.

For parties not crossing the electoral threshold (currently 3.25%) in any given poll, the number of seats is calculated as a percentage of the 120 total seats. Labor-Meretz-Gesher and Labor-Meretz are shown as Labor before the splits; Yesh Atid-Telem is shown as Yesh Atid before the split.

Local regression of polls conducted

== Newspaper endorsements ==
The daily Haaretz endorsed four parties in the 2021 election: Meretz, the Joint List, Labor, and Yesh Atid.

== Results ==
24th Knesset election result map of winning coalition, (Note: Unity coalition comprises Yesh Atid, Blue and White, Yamina, Israeli Labor Party, Yisrael Beiteinu, New Hope, Meretz, and Ra'am; the Netanyahu coalition comprises Likud, Shas, United Torah Judaism, and Religious Zionist Party) by regional election committee: Unity coalition—70–80% Unity coalition—60–70% Unity coalition—50–60% Unity coalition—40–50% Netanyahu coalition—40–50% Netanyahu coalition—50–60% Netanyahu coalition—60–70%

Largest party by Administrative district (left) and sub-district (right)
Likud
Yesh Atid
United Torah Judaism
Joint List

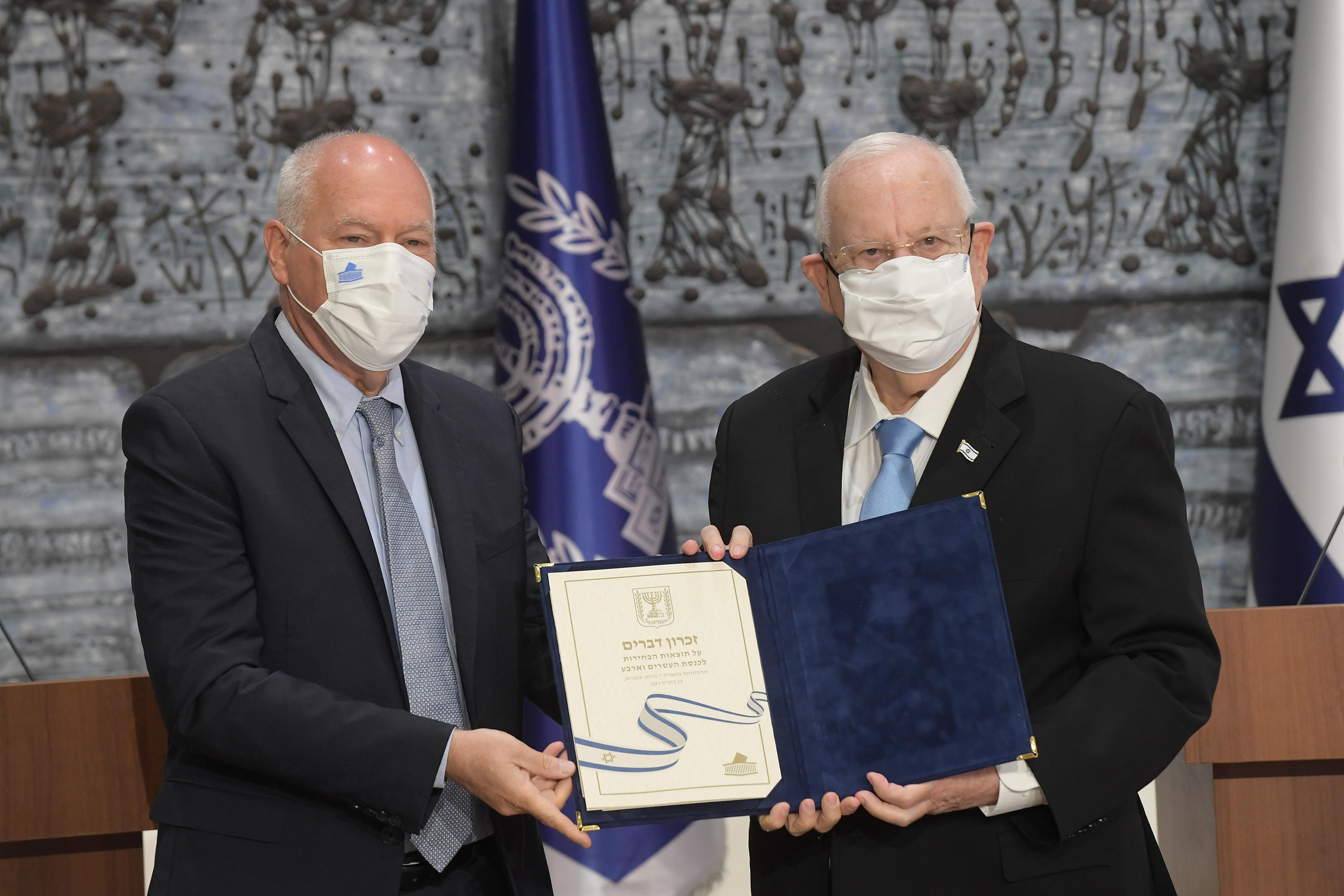
The Central Elections Committee chairman Uzi Vogelman (left) presents the election results to President Reuven Rivlin (right). Beit HaNassi, 31 March 2021.

Party	Votes	%	Seats	+/–
Likud	1,066,892	24.19	30	–7
Yesh Atid	614,112	13.93	17	+4
Shas	316,008	7.17	9	0
Blue and White	292,257	6.63	8	–7
Yamina	273,836	6.21	7	+4
Israeli Labor Party	268,767	6.09	7	+4
United Torah Judaism	248,391	5.63	7	0
Yisrael Beiteinu	248,370	5.63	7	0
Religious Zionist Party	225,641	5.12	6	+4
Joint List	212,583	4.82	6	–5
New Hope	209,161	4.74	6	New
Meretz	202,218	4.59	6	+3
Ra'am	167,064	3.79	4	0
New Economic Party	34,883	0.79	0	New
Rapeh only Health	17,346	0.39	0	New
Pirate Party	1,309	0.03	0	0
Me and You	1,291	0.03	0	0
Hope for Change	1,189	0.03	0	New
Social Bang – Pensioners	811	0.02	0	New
Mishpat Tzedek	729	0.02	0	0
Tzomet	663	0.02	0	0
Am Shalem	592	0.01	0	New
New Order	514	0.01	0	0
Kama	486	0.01	0	0
The Impossible – Possible	463	0.01	0	New
Jewish Heart	443	0.01	0	0
Atzmeinu	441	0.01	0	New
Bible Bloc	429	0.01	0	0
New World	429	0.01	0	New
Common Alliance	408	0.01	0	0
The Israelis	395	0.01	0	New
Shama	395	0.01	0	0
Da'am Workers Party	385	0.01	0	0
Social Leadership	256	0.01	0	0
Ma'an – Together for a New Era	253	0.01	0	New
Hetz	226	0.01	0	New
Us	220	0.00	0	New
Human Dignity	196	0.00	0	0
Total	4,410,052	100.00	120	0
Valid votes	4,410,052	99.41		
Invalid/blank votes	26,313	0.59		
Total votes	4,436,365	100.00		
Registered voters/turnout	6,578,084	67.44		
Source: CEC

=== Members of the Knesset who lost their seats ===
Party	Name	Year elected	Source
Blue and White	Ruth Wasserman Lande	2021	
Joint List	Heba Yazbak	2019	
Joint List	Yousef Jabareen	2015	
Joint List	Sondos Saleh	2020	
Joint List	Jabar Asakla	2019	
Likud	Tali Ploskov	2020	
Likud	Uzi Dayan	2020	
Likud	Ariel Kallner	2020	
Likud	Osnat Mark	2020	
Likud	Amit Halevi	2020	
Likud	Nissim Vaturi	2020	
Likud	Shevah Stern	2020	
Likud	Ayoob Kara	2020	
Likud	Matti Yogev	2020	
New Hope	Zvi Hauser	2019	
Shas	Yosef Taieb	2020	
Ra'am	Iman Khatib-Yasin	2020	
United Torah Judaism	Ya'akov Tessler	2019	
United Torah Judaism	Eliyahu Baruchi	2020	
Yesh Atid	Moshe Tur-Paz	2020	

== Government formation ==
Israeli President Reuven Rivlin met with the heads of all political parties on 5 April, and charged Benjamin Netanyahu with forming the government the next day. Netanyahu had been given until the end of 4 May to form a government. Netanyahu failed to form a new government by the deadline. The next day, Rivlin entrusted Yair Lapid with the second mandate. On 9 May 2021, it was reported that Lapid and Naftali Bennett had made major headway in the coalition talks. On 10 May, it was reported that plans were made to form a new government consisting of the current opposition, but that the Islamist Ra'am, which froze talks with both Lapid and Bennett in the wake of recent warfare in Gaza, still needed to pledge support for the Change bloc for the opposition MKs to secure a majority. In late May, Lapid secured the support from Blue and White, Labor Party, Yisrael Beiteinu, New Hope, and Meretz, with Yamina and Ra'am possibly giving support. On 30 May 2021, Bennett announced in a televised address that Yamina would join a unity government with Lapid, after all but one Yamina MK agreed to back this decision.

On 2 June 2021, following negotiations with Lapid and Bennett, Ra'am leader Mansour Abbas officially signed a coalition agreement with Lapid, and agreed to allow his party to join a non-Netanyahu government. Just an hour before his 2 June mandate was set to expire, Lapid informed outgoing president Reuven Rivlin that he could form a new government. On 11 June 2021, Bennett's Yamina party became the last opposition faction to sign a coalition agreement with Lapid's Yesh Atid party, thus allowing the thirty-sixth government of Israel to be sworn in on 13 June. Bennett became prime minister with Lapid as alternate prime minister, intended to take over as head of government in 2023.

== See also ==
- 2021 in Israel
- 2021 Israeli presidential election
- List of elections in 2021
- List of members of the twenty-fourth Knesset
