= Ruth Wasserman Lande =

Israeli politician and activist

- רות וסרמן לנדה
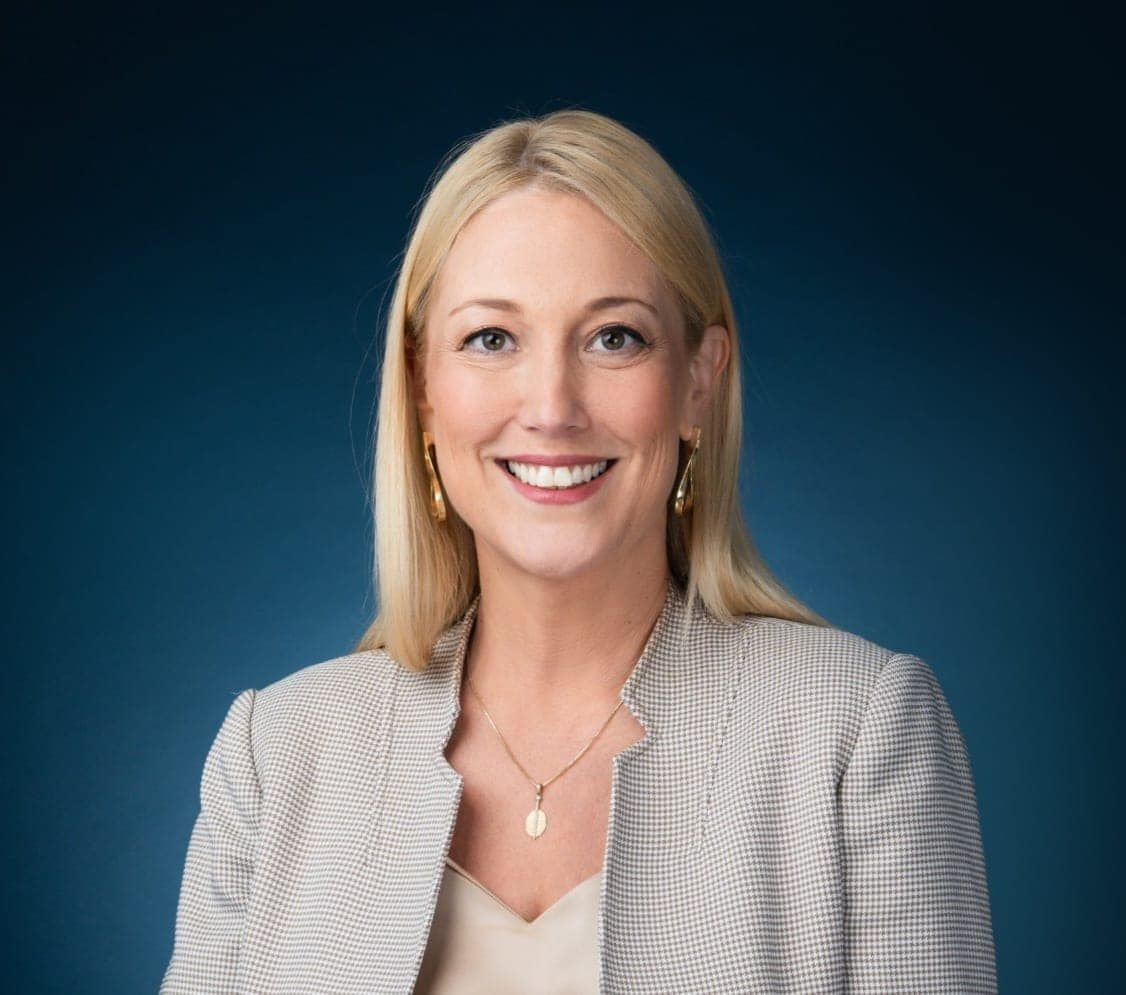

Faction represented in the Knesset
- 2021: Blue and White
- 2021: Blue and White
- 2021-2022: Blue and White

Personal details
- Born: February 28, 1976 (age 50) Ashdod, Israel

Ruth Wasserman Lande (Hebrew: רות וסרמן לנדה; born February 28, 1976) is an Israeli politician, diplomat and activist. She was a member of the Knesset for the Blue and White party from 2021 until 2022 and also was an MK for the party in two short spells in early 2021.

She is also the founder and CEO of a strategic consultancy, working with public entities within the Israeli and international arenas, a public speaker, a diplomat, lecturer, column writer in Maariv, and social activist particularly amidst the Arab population in Israel. She is also a Middle East affairs' commentator for various media outlets around the world. Wasserman Lande served as an advisor for late President Shimon Peres, as the de facto Deputy Ambassador at the Israeli embassy in Cairo and for almost a decade as the Deputy Director General for International Affairs at the Israeli Federation of Local Authorities.

== Biography ==
=== Family and studies ===
Ruth Lande was born in Israel to Pinchas and Sofia Lande, who emigrated from Lithuania. When she was nine, her family moved to Cape Town, South Africa, where she attended Herzlia High School.

She was awarded the Simcha Pratt Award for excellence for her Thesis, analyzing the negotiations between Israel and the Palestinians within the framework of the Oslo Accords.

=== Career ===
In January 2003, she was appointed to a diplomatic post at the Israeli embassy in Egypt. There she focused on promoting Israeli-Egyptian political and economic relations, including creating the platform for the QIZ – The qualified industrial zone trade agreement between Israel-Egypt and the USA.

Following her diplomatic service in Cairo, Wasserman Lande began studying for a second M.A. in policy and government at Harvard University's Kennedy School of Government. That is, within the framework of the Wexner Scholarship. In 2007, Wasserman Lande was seconded from the Ministry of Foreign Affairs to work for two years as an adviser to former Israeli President Shimon Peres.

== Public activities ==
Wasserman Lande lived for a decade in the Israeli Jewish-Arab city of Lod, where she and her ex-husband, Aviv, were the founders of the Lod Community Foundation, which was founded in 2008. Volunteering with the foundation, she played a role in developing tourism, culture, education, and employment in the city.

Upon returning to Israel, Wasserman Lande was appointed as the Deputy Director-General of the Federation of Local Authorities in Israel. She reached out to the international arena to identify foreign investors, empowerment opportunities, partners for cooperation, and people-to-people initiatives for local governments throughout Israel. Within this framework, she worked closely with cities in the periphery and the country's center, both Arab and Jewish, religious and secular, large and small. Here, she also set out-voluntarily- to create a model of emulation out of a Bedouin village in the North of the country, Shibli–Umm al-Ghanam,.

Since 2019, she has been writing a column in one of Israel's leading newspapers, Maariv, dealing with different angles of the Israeli Arab realm and the Middle East.

She is also a commentator on Egyptian and Middle Eastern affairs on foreign and Israeli television stations, including National Public Radio (NPR),Israel's Channel 1, Channel 2, Hala TV, Bukra and Israel Plus. She is fluent in Hebrew, English, Russian, and Arabic.

She became an MK in early January 2021 as a replacement for Meirav Cohen, though she was forced from her seat when Yizhar Shai resigned his ministerial position and regained his previous Knesset seat. She regained a Knesset seat when Ram Shefa resigned.
