= List of members of the twenty-fifth Knesset =

List of current members of the Knesset

25th Knesset
←	24th	26th	→

Overview
- Legislative body: Knesset
- Jurisdiction: Israel
- Meeting place: Knesset building
- Term: 15 November 2022 – 11 November 2026
- Election: 1 November 2022
- Government: 37th government War cabinet (2023-24)

Knesset
- President: Isaac Herzog
- Prime minister: Benjamin Netanyahu
- Speaker: Amir Ohana

The members of the 25th Knesset were elected on 1 November 2022 and sworn in on 15 November. This list reflects the composition of the Knesset at the end of its term in 11 November 2026, incorporating changes resulting from resignations, replacements under the Norwegian Law, and other personnel shifts since the election.

== Composition ==
Three Druze lawmakers, 29 women, 23 new MKs and three openly gay MKs were elected to the 25th Knesset. The number of Arab MKs from Arab parties was the lowest in two decades, with 10 MKs.

On 30 June 2024, the Israeli Labor Party announced plans to merge with Meretz to become The Democrats, with Labor MKs expected to become MKs for the new party; the merger was approved on 12 July. However, Likud MK and chair of the Knesset House Committee Ofir Katz denied the February 2025 request by Labor chairwoman Efrat Rayten to change the name of the Knesset faction to The Democrats and she withdrew it.

On 11 November 2024 Hadash-Ta'al MK Ofer Cassif was suspended from the Knesset for six months for supporting South Africa's genocide case against Israel.

Faction	Party	Leader In the Knesset	Members	Status
Likud	Likud	Benjamin Netanyahu	32	Governing coalition
Yesh Atid	Yesh Atid	Yair Lapid	24	Opposition
Shas	Shas	Aryeh Deri	11	Governing coalition
Blue and White - National Unity	Blue and White	Benny Gantz	8	Opposition
Otzma Yehudit	Otzma Yehudit	Itamar Ben-Gvir	7	Governing coalition
United Torah Judaism	Degel HaTorah	Moshe Gafni	7	Opposition
United Torah Judaism	Agudat Yisrael	Moshe Gafni	7	Opposition
Religious Zionist Party	Religious Zionist Party	Bezalel Smotrich	6	Governing coalition
Yisrael Beiteinu	Yisrael Beiteinu	Avigdor Lieberman	6	Opposition
United Arab List	United Arab List	Mansour Abbas	5	Opposition
Hadash–Ta'al	Hadash	Ayman Odeh	5	Opposition
Hadash–Ta'al	Ta'al	Ayman Odeh	5	Opposition
Labor	Labor (Note: The Israeli Labor Party was de facto dissolved on 12 July 2024, merging into The Democrats. The Democrats' members still sit in the 25th Knesset as members of the Labor Party.)	Merav Michaeli (2022-2024); Efrat Rayten (2024-2026)	4	Opposition
New Hope	New Hope	Gideon Sa'ar	4	Governing coalition
Noam	Noam	Avi Maoz	1	Unaffiliated

== Members of the Knesset ==
Faction	Party	Name
Likud (32)	Likud	Benjamin Netanyahu
Likud (32)	Likud	Yariv Levin
Likud (32)	Likud	Amir Ohana
Likud (32)	Likud	Nir Barkat
Likud (32)	Likud	Avi Dichter
Likud (32)	Likud	Israel Katz
Likud (32)	Likud	Shlomo Karhi
Likud (32)	Likud	David Bitan
Likud (32)	Likud	Yuli Edelstein
Likud (32)	Likud	Eliyahu Revivo
Likud (32)	Likud	Galit Distel-Atbaryan
Likud (32)	Likud	Nissim Vaturi
Likud (32)	Likud	Shalom Danino
Likud (32)	Likud	Tali Gottlieb
Likud (32)	Likud	Hanoch Milwidsky
Likud (32)	Likud	Boaz Bismuth
Likud (32)	Likud	Moshe Saada
Likud (32)	Likud	Eli Dellal
Likud (32)	Likud	Gila Gamliel
Likud (32)	Likud	Ofir Katz
Likud (32)	Likud	May Golan
Likud (32)	Likud	Dan Illouz
Likud (32)	Likud	Ariel Kallner
Likud (32)	Likud	Eti Atiya
Likud (32)	Likud	Amit Halevi
Likud (32)	Likud	Tsega Melaku
Likud (32)	Likud	Osher Shekalim
Likud (32)	Likud	Keti Shitrit
Likud (32)	Likud	Moshe Passal
Likud (32)	Likud	Sasson Guetta
Likud (32)	Likud	Avihai Boaron
Likud (32)	Likud	Afif Abed
Yesh Atid (24)	Yesh Atid	Yair Lapid
Yesh Atid (24)	Yesh Atid	Meir Cohen
Yesh Atid (24)	Yesh Atid	Karine Elharrar
Yesh Atid (24)	Yesh Atid	Meirav Cohen
Yesh Atid (24)	Yesh Atid	Elazar Stern
Yesh Atid (24)	Yesh Atid	Mickey Levy
Yesh Atid (24)	Yesh Atid	Meirav Ben-Ari
Yesh Atid (24)	Yesh Atid	Ram Ben-Barak
Yesh Atid (24)	Yesh Atid	Yoav Segalovitz
Yesh Atid (24)	Yesh Atid	Boaz Toporovsky
Yesh Atid (24)	Yesh Atid	Michal Shir
Yesh Atid (24)	Yesh Atid	Yorai Lahav-Hertzanu
Yesh Atid (24)	Yesh Atid	Vladimir Beliak
Yesh Atid (24)	Yesh Atid	Ron Katz
Yesh Atid (24)	Yesh Atid	Matti Sarfati Harkavi
Yesh Atid (24)	Yesh Atid	Tania Mazarsky
Yesh Atid (24)	Yesh Atid	Yasmin Fridman
Yesh Atid (24)	Yesh Atid	Debbie Biton
Yesh Atid (24)	Yesh Atid	Moshe Tur-Paz
Yesh Atid (24)	Yesh Atid	Simon Davidson
Yesh Atid (24)	Yesh Atid	Naor Shiri
Yesh Atid (24)	Yesh Atid	Shelly Tal Meron
Yesh Atid (24)	Yesh Atid	Yaron Levi
Yesh Atid (24)	Yesh Atid	Adi Azuz
Shas (11)	Shas	Aryeh Deri
Shas (11)	Shas	Ya'akov Margi
Shas (11)	Shas	Yoav Ben-Tzur
Shas (11)	Shas	Michael Malchieli
Shas (11)	Shas	Haim Biton
Shas (11)	Shas	Erez Malul
Shas (11)	Shas	Yinon Azulai
Shas (11)	Shas	Moshe Abutbul
Shas (11)	Shas	Uriel Buso
Shas (11)	Shas	Yosef Taieb
Shas (11)	Shas	Yonatan Mishraki
Blue and White - National Unity (8)	Blue and White	Benny Gantz
Blue and White - National Unity (8)	Blue and White	Eitan Ginzburg
Blue and White - National Unity (8)	Blue and White	Pnina Tamano-Shata
Blue and White - National Unity (8)	Blue and White	Hili Tropper
Blue and White - National Unity (8)	Blue and White	Michael Biton
Blue and White - National Unity (8)	Blue and White	Yael Ron Ben-Moshe
Blue and White - National Unity (8)	Blue and White	Orit Farkash-Hacohen
Blue and White - National Unity (8)	Blue and White	Alon Schuster
Religious Zionist Party (7)	Religious Zionist Party	Ofir Sofer
Religious Zionist Party (7)	Religious Zionist Party	Orit Strook
Religious Zionist Party (7)	Religious Zionist Party	Simcha Rothman
Religious Zionist Party (7)	Religious Zionist Party	Michal Waldiger
Religious Zionist Party (7)	Religious Zionist Party	Ohad Tal
Religious Zionist Party (7)	Religious Zionist Party	Moshe Solomon
Religious Zionist Party (7)	Religious Zionist Party	Zvi Sukkot
United Torah Judaism (7)	Agudat Yisrael	Yitzhak Goldknopf
United Torah Judaism (7)	Degel HaTorah	Moshe Gafni
United Torah Judaism (7)	Agudat Yisrael	Meir Porush
United Torah Judaism (7)	Degel HaTorah	Uri Maklev
United Torah Judaism (7)	Agudat Yisrael	Ya'akov Tessler
United Torah Judaism (7)	Degel HaTorah	Ya'akov Asher
United Torah Judaism (7)	Agudat Yisrael	Yitzhak Pindrus
Otzma Yehudit (6)	Otzma Yehudit	Itamar Ben-Gvir
Otzma Yehudit (6)	Otzma Yehudit	Yitzhak Wasserlauf
Otzma Yehudit (6)	Otzma Yehudit	Zvika Fogel
Otzma Yehudit (6)	Otzma Yehudit	Limor Son Har-Melech
Otzma Yehudit (6)	Otzma Yehudit	Yitzhak Kroizer
Otzma Yehudit (6)	Otzma Yehudit	Amihai Eliyahu
Yisrael Beiteinu (6)	Yisrael Beiteinu	Avigdor Lieberman
Yisrael Beiteinu (6)	Yisrael Beiteinu	Oded Forer
Yisrael Beiteinu (6)	Yisrael Beiteinu	Evgeny Sova
Yisrael Beiteinu (6)	Yisrael Beiteinu	Sharon Nir
Yisrael Beiteinu (6)	Yisrael Beiteinu	Yulia Malinovsky
Yisrael Beiteinu (6)	Yisrael Beiteinu	Hamad Amar
United Arab List (5)	United Arab List	Mansour Abbas
United Arab List (5)	United Arab List	Walid Taha
United Arab List (5)	United Arab List	Waleed Alhwashla
United Arab List (5)	United Arab List	Iman Khatib-Yasin
United Arab List (5)	United Arab List	Yasser Hujirat
Hadash–Ta'al (5)	Hadash	Ayman Odeh
Hadash–Ta'al (5)	Ta'al	Ahmad Tibi
Hadash–Ta'al (5)	Hadash	Aida Touma-Suleiman
Hadash–Ta'al (5)	Hadash	Ofer Cassif
Hadash–Ta'al (5)	Ta'al	Samir Bin Said
Labor (4)	Labor	Merav Michaeli
Labor (4)	Labor	Naama Lazimi
Labor (4)	Labor	Gilad Kariv
Labor (4)	Labor	Efrat Rayten
New Hope (4)	New Hope	Ze'ev Elkin
New Hope (4)	New Hope	Sharren Haskel
New Hope (4)	New Hope	Michel Buskila
New Hope (4)	New Hope	Akram Hasson
Noam (1)	Noam	Avi Maoz

=== Replacements ===
Date	Replacement	Party	Replacing	Notes
1 January 2023	Yitzhak Kroizer	Otzma Yehudit	Amihai Eliyahu	Eliyahu resigned from the Knesset under the Norwegian Law after being appointed to the cabinet
3 January 2023	Yonatan Mishraki	Shas	Yoav Ben-Tzur	Ben-Tzur resigned from the Knesset under the Norwegian Law after being appointed to the cabinet
6 January 2023	Dan Illouz	Likud	Miki Zohar	Zohar resigned from the Knesset under the Norwegian Law after being appointed to the cabinet
6 January 2023	Ariel Kallner	Likud	Haim Katz	Katz resigned from the Knesset under the Norwegian Law after being appointed to the cabinet
6 January 2023	Yitzhak Pindrus	United Torah Judaism	Yitzhak Goldknopf	Goldknopf resigned from the Knesset under the Norwegian Law after being appointed to the cabinet
7 January 2023	Eti Atiya	Likud	Idit Silman	Silman resigned from the Knesset under the Norwegian Law after being appointed to the cabinet
17 January 2023	Amit Halevi	Likud	Amichai Chikli	Chikli resigned from the Knesset under the Norwegian Law after being appointed to the cabinet
25 January 2023	Eliyahu Baruchi	United Torah Judaism	Uri Maklev	Maklev resigned from the Knesset under the Norwegian Law after being appointed to the cabinet
25 January 2023	Moshe Roth	United Torah Judaism	Meir Porush	Porush resigned from the Knesset under the Norwegian Law after being appointed to the cabinet
1 February 2023	Shelly Tal Meron	Yesh Atid	Yoel Razvozov	Razvozov resigned from the Knesset and retired from politics
2 February 2023	Simon Moshiashvili	Shas	Haim Biton	Biton resigned from the Knesset under the Norwegian Law after being appointed to the cabinet
2 February 2023	Erez Malul	Shas	Ya'akov Margi	Margi resigned from the Knesset under the Norwegian Law after being appointed to the cabinet
7 February 2023	Zvi Sukkot	Religious Zionist Party	Bezalel Smotrich	Smotrich resigned from the Knesset under the Norwegian Law after being appointed to the cabinet
9 February 2023	Tsega Melaku	Likud	Ofir Akunis	Akunis resigned from the Knesset under the Norwegian Law after being appointed to the cabinet
15 February 2023	Osher Shekalim	Likud	Eli Cohen	Cohen resigned from the Knesset under the Norwegian Law after being appointed to the cabinet
15 February 2023	Keti Shitrit	Likud	Miri Regev	Regev resigned from the Knesset under the Norwegian Law after being appointed to the cabinet
12 March 2023	Moshe Passal	Likud	Galit Distel-Atbaryan	Distel-Atbaryan resigned from the Knesset under the Norwegian Law after being appointed to the cabinet
26 March 2023	Sasson Guetta	Likud	Yoav Kisch	Kisch resigned from the Knesset under the Norwegian Law after being appointed to the cabinet
31 March 2023	Avihai Boaron	Likud	Dudi Amsalem	Amsalem resigned from the Knesset under the Norwegian Law after being appointed to the cabinet
1 August 2023	Yaron Levi	Yesh Atid	Orna Barbivai	Barbivai resigned from the Knesset to serve as Yesh Atid's candidate for mayor of Tel Aviv
14 October 2023	Galit Distel-Atbaryan	Likud	Avihai Boaron	Distel-Atbaryan resigned from the cabinet and was reappointed to the Knesset under the Norwegian Law
1 July 2024	Avihai Boaron	Likud	Danny Danon	Danon resigned to become Permanent Representative of Israel to the United Nations
5 July 2024	Michel Buskila	New Hope	Yifat Shasha-Biton	Biton resigned after announcing her retirement from politics
5 January 2025	Afif Abed	Likud	Yoav Gallant	Gallant resigned from the Knesset on 5 January. Abed was sworn in the following day.
21 January 2025	Amihai Eliyahu	Otzma Yehudit	Zvi Sukkot	Eliyahu resigned from the cabinet after Otzma Yehudit withdrew from the government and was reappointed to the Knesset under the Norwegian Law.
6 April 2025	Zvi Sukkot	Religious Zionist Party	Almog Cohen	Cohen resigned from the Knesset to accept an appointment as Deputy Minister in the Prime Minister's Office.
15 June 2025	Yitzhak Goldknopf	United Torah Judaism	Eliyahu Baruchi	Goldknopf resigned from the cabinet to protest the failure to pass a draft law and was reappointed to the Knesset under the Norwegian Law.
23 June 2025	Samir Bin Said	Hadash–Ta'al	Youssef Atauna	Said replaced Atauna as part of a parliamentary rotation agreement between Hadash and Ta'al.
2 July 2025	Eliyahu Baruchi	United Torah Judaism	Ya'akov Tessler	Tessler resigned on 2 July and was replaced by Baruchi.
4 July 2025	Eitan Ginzburg	National Unity	Gadi Eisenkot	Eisenkot submitted his Knesset resignation on 2 July and was replaced by Ginzburg.
8 July 2025	Yael Ron Ben-Moshe	National Unity	Matan Kahana	Kahana resigned from the Knesset and was replaced by Ron Ben-Moshe.
10 July 2025	Akram Hasson	New Hope	Gideon Sa'ar	Sa'ar resigned under the Norwegian Law and was replaced by Akram Hasson.
16 July 2025	Uri Maklev	United Torah Judaism	Eliyahu Baruchi	Maklev resigned from the cabinet when UTJ left the government, and was reappointed to the Knesset under the Norwegian Law.
16 July 2025	Meir Porush	United Torah Judaism	Moshe Roth	Porush resigned from the cabinet when UTJ left the government, and was reappointed to the Knesset under the Norwegian Law.
17 July 2025	Ya'akov Tessler	United Torah Judaism	Yitzhak Pindrus	Tessler resigned from the cabinet when UTJ left the government, and was reappointed to the Knesset under the Norwegian Law.
20 July 2025	Ya'akov Margi	Shas	Simon Moshiashvili	Margi resigned from the cabinet when Shas left the government, and was reappointed to the Knesset under the Norwegian Law.
20 July 2025	Haim Biton	Shas	Erez Malul	Biton resigned from the cabinet when Shas left the government, and was reappointed to the Knesset under the Norwegian Law.
20 July 2025	Erez Malul	Shas	Avraham Betzalel	Betzalel resigned after allegations of misconduct, making Malul an MK again briefly.
20 July 2025	Yoav Ben-Tzur	Shas	Erez Malul	Ben-Tzur resigned from the cabinet when Shas left the government, and was reappointed to the Knesset under the Norwegian Law.
13 August 2025	Adi Azuz	Yesh Atid	Idan Roll	Roll resigned from the Knesset and retired from politics on 11 August
21 January 2026	Yitzhak Pindrus	United Torah Judaism	Yisrael Eichler	Eichler resigned from the Knesset under the Norwegian Law after being appointed to the cabinet
19 May 2026	Moshe Arbel	Shas	Erez Malul	Arbel retired from politics
28 July 2026	Ron Katz	Yesh Atid	Muhammad Abu Elhega	Katz resigned in order to "take a break from public life"
11 August 2026	Yoav Segalovitz	Yesh Atid	Michal Slawny Cababia	Segalovitz resigned from the Knesset after leaving Yesh Atid
13 August 2026	Shabtai Katash	Likud	Dan Illouz	Illouz resigned from the Knesset after leaving Likud
September 2026	Elazar Stern	Yesh Atid	Roni Malkai	Stern resigned from the Knesset after leaving Yesh Atid

== See also ==
- Thirty-seventh government of Israel
- Party lists for the 2022 Israeli legislative election
