= Party lists for the 2021 Israeli legislative election =

The 2021 Israeli legislative election was held using closed list proportional representation. Each party presented a list of candidates to the Central Elections Committee prior to the election.

== Blue and White ==
The Blue and White list is headed by Benny Gantz.

1. Benny Gantz
2. Pnina Tamano-Shata
3. Hili Tropper
4. Michael Biton
5. Orit Farkash-Hacohen
6. Alon Schuster
7. Eitan Ginzburg
8. Yael Ron Ben-Moshe
9. Mufid Mari
10. Ruth Wasserman Lande
11. Alon Tal
12. Yehudit Uliel Malka
13. Elham Khazen
14. Shai Zoldan
15. Shai David
16. Hizki Haim Yehezkel Sibak
17. Monica Yael Lev-Cohen
18. Arbel Yager Yellin
19. Keren Gonen
20. Or Shalev
21. Sharona Amar
22. Amir Shoshani
23. Amir Eliezer
24. Raz Friedman
25. Kobi Figaro
26. Tamar Shavit
27. Daniel Shmuel Avigdor
28. Yosef Mazor
29. Michal Moskowitz
30. Noa Mantber
31. Boaz Hanani
32. Michal Sara Dor
33. Dan Ben Yehuda
34. Assaf Namani
35. Yossi Cohen
36. Yonatan Yosef Damari
37. Anat Shadmi
38. Yosef-Yossi Toubor
39. Aviv Moses
40. Meirav Ziv Silverberg
41. Nofar Abuharon
42. Michael Yisraelov
43. Itamar Yehuda
44. Zvi Avissar
45. Batya Oren
46. Avri Steiner
47. Idan Lazar
48. Gavriel Oren
49. Pinhas Cohen
50. Uzi Yonah
51. Shimon Sasi
52. Ilan Shabtai Factor
53. David Assayag
54. Pierre Barnes
55. Hillel Hillman

== Joint List ==
The Joint List list is headed by Ayman Odeh.

1. Ayman Odeh (Hadash)
2. Ahmad Tibi (Ta'al)
3. Sami Abu Shehadeh (Balad)
4. Aida Touma-Suleiman (Hadash)
5. Osama Saadi (Ta'al)
6. Ofer Cassif (Hadash)
7. Heba Yazbak (Balad)
8. Yousef Jabareen (Hadash)
9. Juma Azbarga (Balad)
10. Sondos Saleh (Ta'al)
11. Jabar Asakla (Hadash)
12. Youssef Atauna (Hadash)
13. Aiad Rabi (Balad)
14. Jassan Abdallah (Ta'al)
15. Noa Levi (Hadash)
16. Mahasan Kis (Balad)
17. Feeda Abu-Dbai-Nara (Hadash)
18. Haitam Zakhalakeh (Ta'al)
19. Marweh Abed (Balad)
20. Shawiri Shadi Zidan (Hadash)
21. Samir Bin Said (Ta'al)
22. Safouat Abu Ria (Hadash)
23. Orly Noy (Balad)
24. Said Issa (Ta'al)
25. Darwish Raabi (Hadash)
26. Raid Gataas (Balad)
27. Mouanes Abed Al Halim (Ta'al)
28. Efraim Davidi (Hadash)
29. Nahala Tanus (Balad)
30. Ahmed Dalasheh (Ta'al)
31. Omar Wakad (Hadash)
32. Walid Kaaden (Balad)
33. Kassem Sallem (Hadash)
34. Zohir Yousefiyeh (Ta'al)
35. Monir Hamoudeh (Hadash)
36. Saliman Al Athaika (Balad)
37. Abid Abidd (Ta'al)
38. Mor Shoshan Stoller (Hadash)
39. Salim Huri (Hadash)
40. Silaan Dalal (Balad)
41. Wafi Abu Ahmed (Ta'al)
42. Bosina Dabit (Hadash)
43. Muhamad Agbariyeh (Balad)
44. Oren David Peled (Hadash)
45. Shadi Basal Abaas (Ta'al)
46. Arin Harika (Hadash)
47. Lulu Taha (Balad)
48. Ffatima Abu Ardat (Ta'al)
49. Itai Aknin (Hadash)
50. Kassem Bakri (Balad)
51. Omar Saksak (Hadash)
52. Maaher Husseim (Ta'al)
53. Tamar Mareh (Hadash)
54. Halled Abu Sakut (Balad)
55. Hussin Htib (Hadash)
56. Ziad Awida (Ta'al)
57. Mustafa Washahi (Hadash)
58. Attia Darawsha (Balad)
59. Masaab Duhan (Hadash)
60. Muhamad Bakri (Hadash)
61. Albaier Andria (Balad)
62. Noha Bader (Hadash)
63. Mouanes Shalabi (Hadash)
64. Isa Nikkola (Hadash)
65. Muhamad Sobah (Balad)
66. Eitan Klinsky (Hadash)
67. Ziad Muhara (Ta'al)
68. Balal Hamarshi (Hadash)
69. Jasser Tagrir Jabarin (Balad)
70. Samah Iraqi (Hadash)
71. Nasser Mansour (Ta'al)
72. Huria Nasra (Hadash)
73. Mahmoud Souwed (Balad)
74. Assaad Knanneh (Hadash)
75. Roni Felsen (Ta'al)
76. Moria Shlomot (Hadash)
77. Halled Titi (Balad)
78. Zohir Karkabi (Hadash)
79. Assad Hasan (Ta'al)
80. Nabila Espanioli (Hadash)
81. Hassan Alnsasreh (Balad)
82. Najiba Gataas (Hadash)
83. Liana Huri (Hadash)
84. Samy Yassin (Hadash)
85. Az Aladin Badraan (Balad)
86. Hanna Zand-Zelshich (Hadash)
87. Izhar Zabidaath (Ta'al)
88. Amir Badraan Sliman (Hadash)
89. Salah Diraouwi (Ta'al)
90. Binyamin Gonen (Hadash)
91. Fathi Dakkeh (Balad)
92. Touwafik Knaani (Hadash)
93. Munir Abbed Al Halim (Ta'al)
94. Abbed Alrahim Forkeh (Balad)
95. Naif Hajazi (Ta'al)
96. Fouz Abidd (Hadash)
97. Leah Zemmel Warshawsky (Balad)
98. Salin Sali Ismail (Ta'al)
99. Ali Saruji (Ta'al)
100. Arafat Badarneh (Hadash)
101. Abdullah Abu Ma'aruf (Hadash)
102. Tatour Doua Hosh (Balad)
103. Ramez Jaraisi (Hadash)
104. Mai Gabar (Ta'al)
105. Tamar Gozansky (Hadash)
106. Riad Mahamid (Balad)
107. Asaad Mahul (Hadash)
108. Muhamad Wathed (Ta'al)
109. Haneen Zoabi (Balad)
110. Mansoour Dahamsha (Hadash)
111. Adal Aamar (Hadash)
112. Nasir Faour (Ta'al)
113. Wasil Taha (Balad)
114. Naif Sakran (Ta'al)
115. Dov Khenin (Hadash)
116. Mtanes Shehadeh (Balad)
117. Afu Agbaria (Hadash)
118. Aly Hidar (Ta'al)
119. Jamal Zahalka (Balad)
120. Mohamed Nafa (Hadash)

== Labor ==
The Israeli Labor Party list is headed by Merav Michaeli.

1. Merav Michaeli
2. Omer Bar-Lev
3. Emilie Moatti
4. Gilad Kariv
5. Efrat Rayten
6. Ram Shefa
7. Ibtisam Mara'ana
8. Nachman Shai
9. Naama Lazimi
10. Gil Beilin
11. Eran Hermoni
12. Nissim Lasry
13. Alice Goldman
14. Maya Nuri
15. Amir Hanifas
16. Vladimir Sverdlov
17. Yael Aran
18. Yael Fisher
19. Nofar Drukman
20. Haim Har-Zahav
21. Orit Taya Yagarado
22. Gavri Bar Gil
23. Bracha Klimstein Levi
24. Yitzhak Taim
25. Sari Yerushalmi-Ram
26. Abie Avraham Binyamin
27. Orit Tovim
28. Farahan Abu Riash
29. Oded Fried
30. Kinneret Ifrah
31. Moshe Ben Attar
32. Hadas Shaharvani Seidon
33. Efraim Eliezer Bolmash
34. Naava Katz
35. Mulham Malham Daar
36. Noga Ratz
37. Shlomi Weiser
38. Idit Frianti
39. Shalom Daksal
40. Nurit Shem Tov
41. Mark Sarvia
42. Nira Stufiya Schwartz
43. Nir Yitzhak Breitman
44. Dan Bikler
45. Yaron Gadot Zerchensk
46. Yuval Shapira
47. Theodore Neuwirth
48. Yonatan Naji Tzadik
49. Daniel Azoulai
50. Itamar Ilan Wagner
51. Fabian Svir
52. Gal Reich
53. Nir Rosen
54. Yehonatan Regev
55. Tal Yehezkel Alovich
56. Yaacov Mizrahi
57. Noa Golani
58. Or Ziv
59. Ofer Kornfel
60. Ofer Rimon
61. Simon Elfassi
62. Masha Lubelsky
63. Ophir Pines-Paz
64. Amram Mitzna
65. Edna Solodar
66. Uzi Baram
67. Avraham Shochat
68. Shimon Shitrit
69. Ra'anan Cohen
70. Moshe Shahal
71. Aharon Yadlin

== Likud ==
The party is headed by Benjamin Netanyahu. A Likud committee confirmed on 30 December 2020 that no primaries will be held, and the list submitted on behalf of the party will be the same as the list submitted in the previous elections, except for six candidates chosen by Netanyahu who will be elected in the fifth, 26th, 28th, 36th, 39th, and 40th slots. The 28th slot was given to a candidate from the Atid Ehad party.

1. Benjamin Netanyahu
2. Yuli Edelstein
3. Israel Katz
4. Miri Regev
5. Yariv Levin
6. Yoav Gallant
7. Nir Barkat
8. Gila Gamliel
9. Avi Dichter
10. Haim Katz
11. Eli Cohen
12. Galit Distel-Atbaryan
13. Tzachi Hanegbi
14. Ofir Akunis
15. Yuval Steinitz
16. Dudi Amsalem
17. Gadi Yevarkan
18. Amir Ohana
19. Ofir Katz
20. Eti Atiya
21. Yoav Kisch
22. David Bitan
23. Keren Barak
24. Shlomo Karhi
25. Miki Zohar
26. Orly Levy-Abekasis
27. Keti Shitrit
28. Ofir Sofer
29. Fateen Mulla
30. May Golan
31. Tali Ploskov
32. Uzi Dayan
33. Ariel Kallner
34. Osnat Mark
35. Amit Halevi
36. Yair Gabbai
37. Nissim Vaturi
38. Shevah Stern
39. Nael Zoabi
40. Boris Aplichuk
41. Ayoob Kara
42. Matti Yogev
43. Yehudah Glick
44. Nurit Koren
45. Ze'ev Fleishman
46. Avital Dichter
47. Anat Berko
48. Nir Hirschman
49. Yaron Mazuz
50. Avraham Neguise
51. Nava Boker

== Meretz ==
The Meretz list is headed by Nitzan Horowitz.

1. Nitzan Horowitz
2. Tamar Zandberg
3. Yair Golan
4. Ghaida Rinawie Zoabi
5. Issawi Frej
6. Mossi Raz
7. Michal Rozin
8. Gaby Lasky
9. Ali Salalha
10. Kati Piasecki

== New Economic Party ==
The New Economic Party list is headed by Yaron Zelekha.

1. Yaron Zelekha
2. Osnat Akirav
3. Alean El-Krenawi
4. Itzik Turgeman
5. Nadav Asael
6. Tzipi Meinmeiner
7. Wahl Krim
8. Einat Kaufman
9. Itamar Glazer
10. Yehuda Messing

== New Hope ==
The New Hope list is headed by Gideon Sa'ar.

1. Gideon Sa'ar
2. Yifat Shasha-Biton
3. Ze'ev Elkin
4. Yoaz Hendel
5. Sharren Haskel
6. Benny Begin
7. Meir Yitzhak Halevi
8. Zvi Hauser
9. Michal Shir
10. Hila Shay Vazan
11. Dani Dayan
12. Michel Buskila
13. Ofer Berkovitch
14. Avi Ganon
15. Michal Diamant
16. Sahar Pinto
17. Sahar Ismail
18. Alon Keysar
19. Orna Davidai
20. Dovrat Weizer
21. Alon Kaisar
22. Netanel Isak
23. Begashao David Ababa
24. Avi Kalma
25. Refael Ben Shitrit
26. Sofia Ron Moria
27. Hassan Haiiab
28. Victor Tal
29. Zilla Tamir
30. Yitzhak Dickstein
31. Malka Mali Levi
32. Adiel Illouz
33. Nadav Douani
34. Yaacov Shimon Mazza
35. Simi Buhbout
36. Shahar Mi-On
37. Shavit Mass
38. Uri Akiva Heitner
39. Zohar Tal
40. Sinai Shaul Kehat
41. Sigalit Handshar Farkash
42. Yonatan Peter Yaavur
43. Lilach Haiibi Menahem
44. Shimi Eliel
45. Yaacov Muzganuv

== Religious Zionists ==
The Religious Zionists list is headed by Bezalel Smotrich.

1. Bezalel Smotrich (National Union–Tkuma)
2. Michal Waldiger (National Union–Tkuma)
3. Itamar Ben-Gvir (Jewish National Front)
4. Simcha Rothman (National Union–Tkuma)
5. Orit Strook (National Union–Tkuma)
6. Avi Maoz (Noam)
7. Racheli Zinkin (National Union–Tkuma)
8. Ayanau Fareda Sanbatu (National Union–Tkuma)
9. Eliyahu Attiya (National Union–Tkuma)
10. Yitzhak Wasserlauf (Jewish National Front)

== Shas ==
The Shas list is headed by Aryeh Deri.

1. Aryeh Deri
2. Ya'akov Margi
3. Yoav Ben-Tzur
4. Michael Malchieli
5. Haim Biton
6. Moshe Arbel
7. Yinon Azulai
8. Moshe Abutbul
9. Uriel Buso
10. Yosef Taieb
11. Avraham Betzalel
12. Netanel Haik

== United Arab List ==
The United Arab List list is headed by Mansour Abbas.

1. Mansour Abbas
2. Mazen Ghnaim
3. Walid Taha
4. Said al-Harumi
5. Iman Khatib-Yasin

== United Torah Judaism ==
The United Torah Judaism list is headed by Moshe Gafni.

1. Moshe Gafni
2. Yaakov Litzman
3. Uri Maklev
4. Meir Porush
5. Ya'akov Asher
6. Yisrael Eichler
7. Yitzhak Pindros
8. Ya'akov Tessler
9. Eliyahu Baruchi
10. Moshe Roth
11. David Ohana
12. Benjamin Hershler
13. Isaac Reich
14. Joseph Bahm

== Yamina ==
The Yamina list is headed by Naftali Bennett.

1. Naftali Bennett
2. Ayelet Shaked
3. Alon Davidi
4. Matan Kahana
5. Amichai Chikli
6. Nir Orbach
7. Abir Kara
8. Idit Silman
9. Shirly Pinto
10. Shai Maimon
11. Yomtob Kalfon
12. Stella Weinstein
13. Roni Sassover
14. Orna Starkmann
15. Asher Cohen
16. Jeremy Saltan
17. Yosef Spiezer
18. Na'ama Zidikyahu
19. Noy Rosenfeld
20. Ohad Ouzan
21. Yaacov Suisa

== Yesh Atid ==
The Yesh Atid list is headed by Yair Lapid.

1. Yair Lapid
2. Orna Barbivai
3. Meir Cohen
4. Karine Elharrar
5. Meirav Cohen
6. Yoel Razvozov
7. Elazar Stern
8. Mickey Levy
9. Meirav Ben-Ari
10. Ram Ben Barak
11. Yoav Segalovitz
12. Boaz Toporovsky
13. Idan Roll
14. Yorai Lahav-Hertzanu
15. Vladimir Beliak
16. Ron Katz
17. Nira Shpak
18. Tania Mazarsky
19. Yasmin Fridman
20. Inbar Bezek
21. Moshe Tur-Paz
22. Simon Davidson
23. Ronit Erenfroind
24. Zohar Bloom
25. Yifat Ben Shoshan
26. Ibrahim Kasem
27. Oz Haim
28. Tommer Vinner
29. Michal Slawny Cababia
30. Yaron Levi
31. Lydia Hatuel
32. Netzer Bashan
33. Abu Sagit
34. Debbie Biton
35. Yael De Langi
36. Hadar Schweitzer
37. Peleg Reshef
38. Roni Malkai
39. Tal Magara
40. Sarit Handknopf
41. Amir Cohen
42. Shiran Abekasis
43. Dalit Gur Cohen
44. Shaked Benafshi
45. Roy Daid
46. Zehava Landman

== Yisrael Beiteinu ==
The Yisrael Beiteinu list is headed by Avigdor Lieberman.

1. Avigdor Lieberman
2. Oded Forer
3. Evgeny Sova
4. Eli Avidar
5. Yulia Malinovsky
6. Hamad Amar
7. Alex Kushnir
8. Yossi Shain
9. Limor Magen Telem
10. Elina Bardach-Yalov
11. Batya Kahana-Freier-Dror
12. Dor Davidian
13. Shahar Alon
14. Stav Boango
15. Hila Iris Yadid-Barzilai
16. Diana Balvich Losav
17. Aviv-Haim Cohen
18. Michal Oron-Azani
19. David Sandler
20. Anna Gurevich
21. Lior Shapira
22. Zev Bronshvig
