= Avihai Boaron =

Israeli politician (born 1973)

- אביחי בוארון
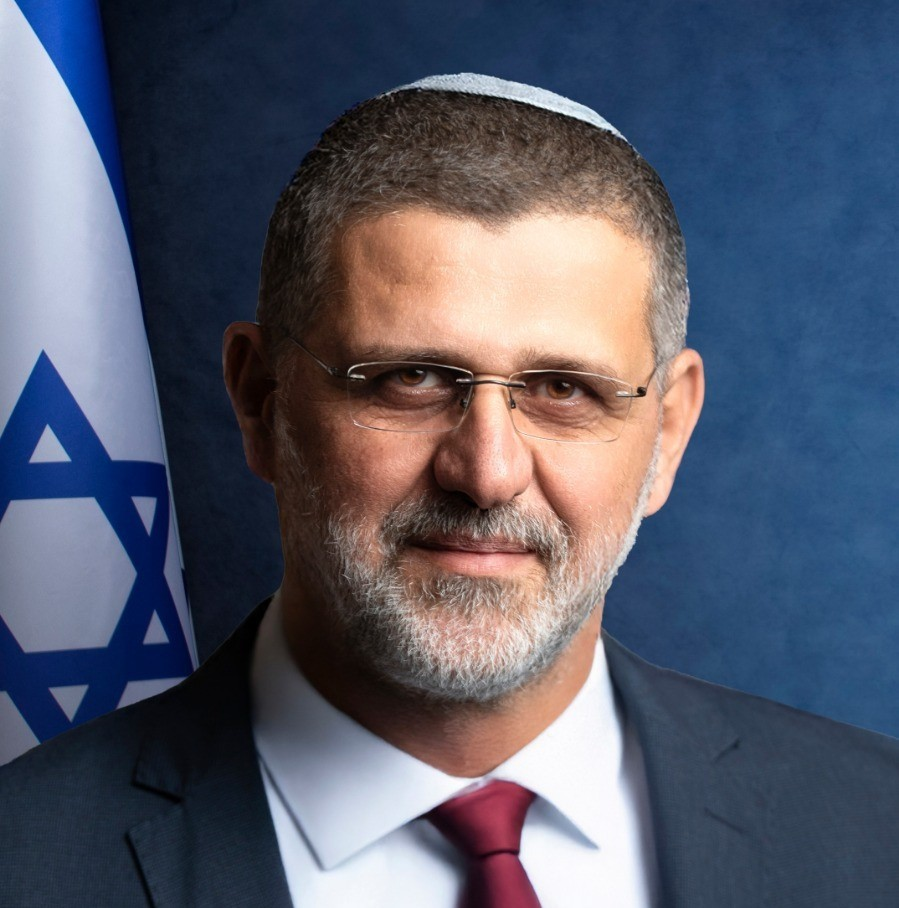
- Boaron in 2021

Faction represented in the Knesset
- 2023: Likud
- 2024–2026: Likud

Personal details
- Born: 12 July 1973 (age 53) Netanya, Israel

Avihai Avraham Boaron (Hebrew: אביחי בוארון) (born 12 July 1973) is an Israeli settler activist and politician who served as a member of the Knesset for Likud from July 2024 until November 2026. He previously held the position from April to October 2023. He first entered the chamber on 2 April, replacing Dudi Amsalem, who resigned under the Norwegian Law to join the Thirty-seventh government of Israel.

== Biography ==
Boaron was born in Netanya to Zevulon Boaron and Malka née Dabush. His parents immigrated from Libya and were teachers in occupation.

Boaron studied at the Aterat Kohanim yeshiva, and after a year and a half at the yeshiva he enlisted in the Israel Defense Forces and served three years as a fighter in the Golani Brigade. After his release from the IDF, he returned to his studies at the yeshiva and also studied at the Meir Institute. After that he turned to law studies, and upon completing the bar exams he opened an independent law firm in Jerusalem.

In 2004, he founded the Ma'aini Yashua movement, which soon deals with hearts and the spread of Judaism. In 2006, he headed the headquarters of the struggle against the demolition of the houses in Amona, and later, in 2017, he headed the headquarters of the struggle against the eviction of the entire settlement. He was one of the drafters of the regularization law in order to prevent the eviction of the settlement. After the evacuation, in 2017 he agreed with Benjamin Netanyahu after long negotiations, on the establishment of the Amichai settlement for the evacuated Amona. Boaron led the actions to establish the settlement and in 2018 the Amona evacuees entered their temporary homes in the settlement. In 2013, he established "Emat - Zionist Research Institute for Law and Economics", which was designed to draft bills in the fields of law and economics to be promoted by sitting members of the Knesset.

In 2011 he founded the magazine "Panima" (פנימה) intended for traditional and religious women. In 2014 he founded the children's magazine and in 2018 he purchased the long-standing children's magazine Letters (אותיות) and merged the two magazines into one magazine, "Letters and Children" (אותיות וילדים). Both magazines are distributed to about thirty thousand subscribing families. At the same time, Boaron began to engage in real estate. Boaron was the opinions editor of the newsletter Ma’ayanei Ha’yeshua. In 2011 Ma’ayanei Ha’yeshua published an unsigned editorial calling for Amalekites to be put in extermination camps, a reference to a religious commandment calling for the destruction of the descendants of Amalek. According to Mondoweiss, Amalekites is often used as a "code word" for the Palestinians.

== Political career ==
On 1 December 2014, Boaron founded "Forum Israel" - the social religious camp in the Jewish Home, and announced his candidacy in the primary elections of The Jewish Home party (הבית היהודי). Boaron was ranked 16th, but the party won only eight seats in the 2015 elections.

In 2016, he was one of the founders of the "Lavi" (לביא) organization, which deals with activities for proper administration, and the "Lavia" association, to encourage settlement in the Galilee and Israel. The "Lavi" organization was one of the main opponents of the Israeli–Lebanese maritime border dispute.

In 2019 he established the "Zion and Jerusalem Forum" within the Likud.

In 2022, he announced his candidacy for the reserved seat for the representative of Judea and Samaria on the Likud list. Boaron defeated Gershon Masika in the primary elections in this slot and was placed 42nd on the Likud list. The list won 32 mandates and established the thirty-seventh Israeli government headed by Benjamin Netanyahu. Following Minister Dudi Amsalem's resignation from the Knesset in accordance with Norwegian law at the end of March 2023, on 2 April Boaron entered the Knesset as a member of the Knesset on behalf of the Likud party.

In 2023, Levin led a line of support for the 2023 Israeli judicial reform, and founded the "Tkuma 2023" (תקומה 2023) organization, which organizes demonstrations in support of the reform. According to Boaron, the government in Israel is not given to the elected officials, but to the New Israel Fund which finances the left, to the High Court which imposes a liberal-progressive alternative on the executive branch and to the legal advisors who fortify the High Court's rule and weaken the people's elected representatives.

Boaron's term in the Knesset ended on 14 October 2023 when Galit Distel-Atbaryan returned to the Knesset after resigning as Information Minister. He returned to the Knesset on 1 July following the resignation of Danny Danon, who resigned to become Permanent Representative of Israel to the United Nations.

In February 2025, after Hamas returned the dead bodies of the Bibas family, who had been taken as hostages, Boaron compared Hamas to Amalek. “Only a neo-Nazi-Shiite ideology of systematic murder of Jews, based on a brutal and sadistic culture, can give rise to such animalistic barbarity. If they could, they would murder us all and rape all our daughters. This is the very nature of Amalek. His purpose. His whole essence, to hunt down the Jews and kill and destroy them,” Boaron wrote on X.

== Personal life ==
Boaron is married to Ofra, has seven children and lives in Amichai, after living in Amona until the settlement was evacuated.

== See also ==
- List of members of the twenty-fifth Knesset
