= State Control Committee =

State Control Committee (Hebrew: הוועדה לענייני ביקורת המדינה) is a permanent Knesset committee which oversees issues of supreme audit institution and the ombudsman institution. The committee was established in the Eighth Knesset, and its first meeting was held on 26 February 1974.

== Activity ==
According to the Knesset's regulations, the committee's areas of responsibility are discussion of the reports of the State Comptroller of Israel and the Ombudsman; powers under the Basic Law: State Comptroller and other laws; and the status and powers of internal auditors. The State Comptroller in Israel also serves as the Ombudsman.

According to Section 6 (a) of the State Comptroller Law 1958, “The Comptroller shall act in liaison with the Knesset’s State Control Committee and shall report to it on his activities at any time he deems fit or as required by the committee.”

The committee translates the conclusions and recommendations of the State Comptroller into practical language, by discussing his findings and inviting representatives of relevant government ministries to appear before it. The State Comptroller Law regulates in detail the working relationship between the State Comptroller and the committee, and grants it the authority to establish an investigative committee to investigate his findings (section 14 of the law), as well as to summon officials of the audited bodies before it (section 18 of the law) and even to demand that they appear before it. Anyone who is required to appear before the committee and fails to do so is liable to a fine.

The committee usually has a subcommittee on security, foreign relations, and international trade relations. It also has a committee of two, which includes the chairperson of State Control Committee and the chairperson of the Foreign Affairs and Security Committee. The committee of two discusses sensitive audit issues that, due to their confidentiality, cannot be discussed even in the closed forum of the State Audit Subcommittee.

Historically, the chairperson of the committee would be a member of the parliamentary opposition. In 2008, the Knesset regulations enshrined this situation.

The committee voted 4-6 in October 2025 against creating a commission of inquiry on the 7 October attacks, with Mickey Levy (Yesh Atid), Meirav Ben-Ari (Yesh Atid), Yael Ron Ben-Moshe (Blue and White), and Waleed Alhwashla (Ra’am) voting in favor, while Moshe Saada (Likud), Osher Shekalim (Likud), Tsega Melaku (Likud), Tally Gotliv (Likud), Ya'akov Tessler (United Torah Judaism, and Moshe Abutbul (Shas) voted against it. Committee chair Levy criticized the vote.
