= Osher Shekalim =

Israeli politician

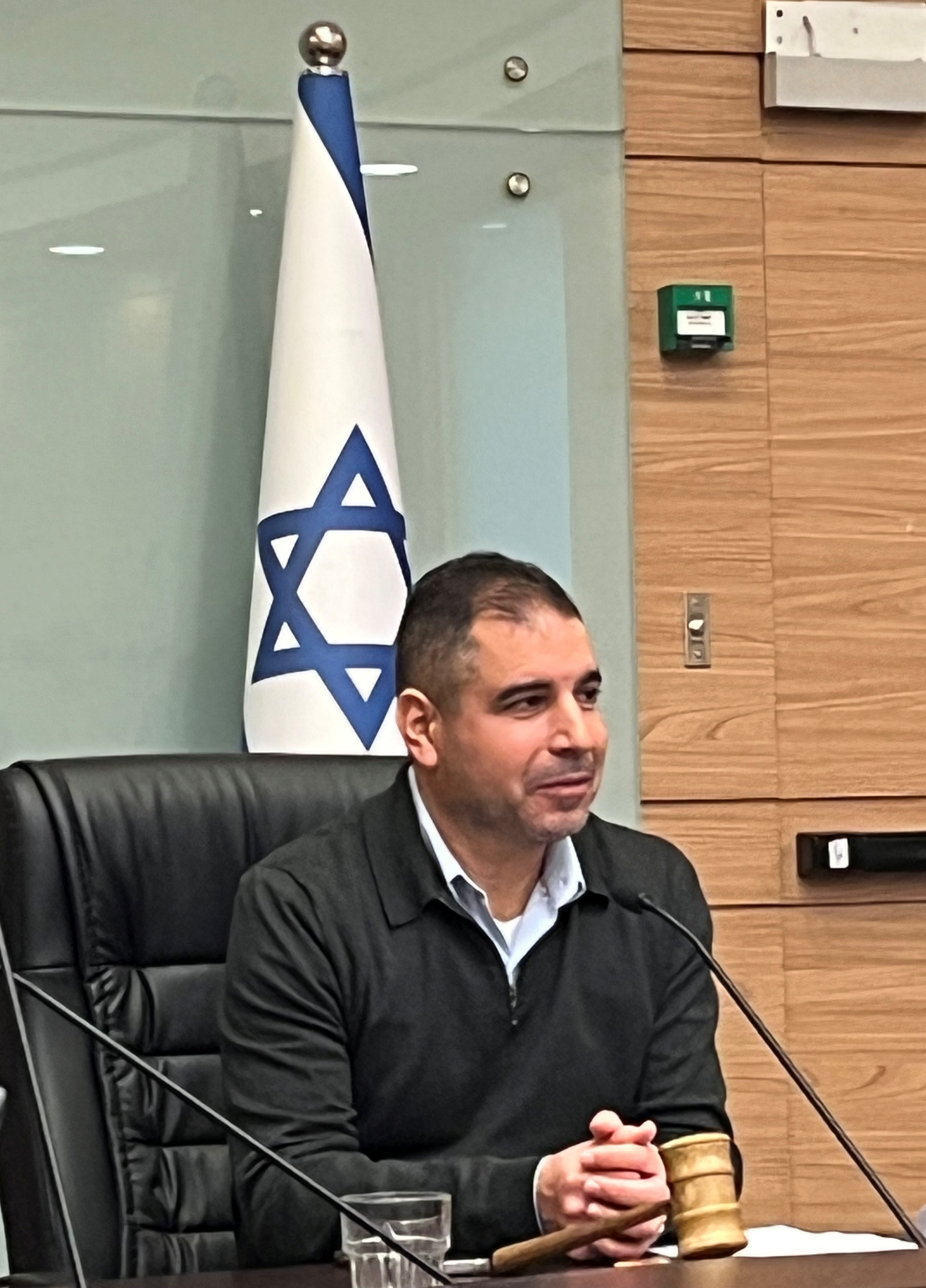

Faction represented in the Knesset
- 2023–2026: Likud

Personal details
- Born: 4 July 1974 (age 52) Holon, Israel

Osher Shekalim (born 4 July 1974) is an Israeli politician who served as a Member of the Knesset for Likud from 2023 to 2026.

== Biography ==
Shekalim was born to Iranian-born parents. He has a master's degree in political communication and a bachelor's degree in political science and sociology, both from Bar-Ilan University. Shekalim ran in Likud primaries ahead of the 2022 Israeli legislative election, competing for the 38th spot on the party's list, reserved for residents of the Tel Aviv area. Shekalim defeated Dor Harlap, a former advisor to Yoav Kisch.

Shekalim was not elected as Likud won 32 seats, but entered the Knesset on 15 February 2023 as a replacement for Eli Cohen, who resigned under the Norwegian Law.

In January 2025 he was one of eight members of the Foreign Affairs and Defense Committee to call on Defense Minister Israel Katz to order the IDF to destroy all water, food and energy sources in the Gaza Strip in order to achieve the war aims. In March 2025, Shekalim called for the forced displacement of the Palestinians in the Gaza Strip, saying emigration from Gaza should not be voluntary. "It's either us or them. Anyone who defines themselves as Palestinian is saying, I am your enemy. I don't want you here," Shekalim said. Shekalim, as a member of the State Control Committee, voted in October 2025 against the creation of a commission of inquiry on the 7 October attacks.

On January 28, 2026 he was appointed as head of the Knesset's special committee for public affairs, replacing MK Yitzhak Pindrus, who left the coalition several months earlier.

== Personal life ==
Shekalim resides in Holon. He is married and has four children.
