= Eli Dellal =

Israeli politician (born 1955)

- אלי דלל
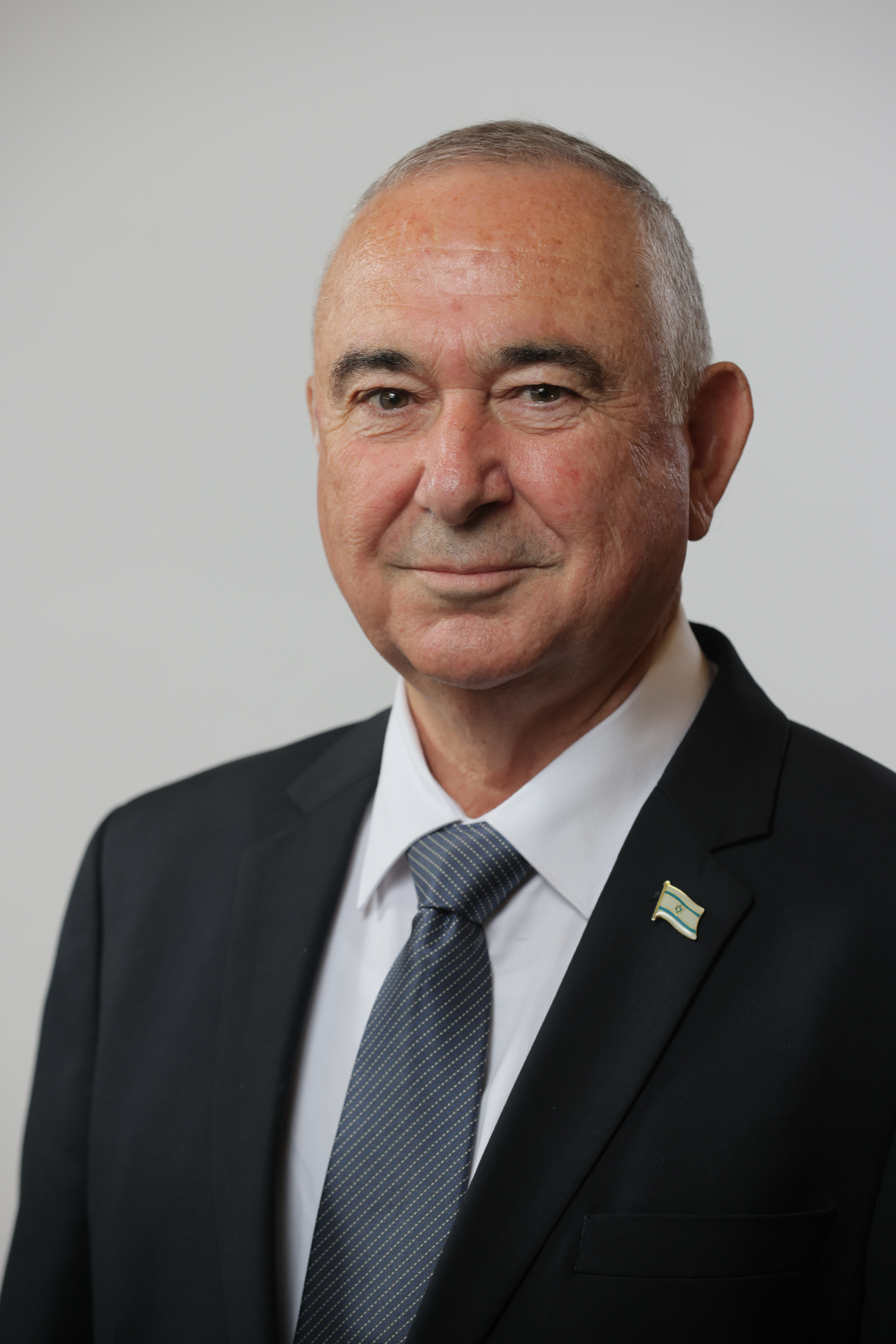

Faction represented in the Knesset
- 2022–2026: Likud

Personal details
- Born: 24 February 1955 (age 71)
- Party: Likud
- Education: University of Tel Aviv

Eliyahu "Eli" Dellal (Hebrew: אליהו "אלי" דלל; born 24 February 1955) is an Israeli politician from the Likud party who was elected to the twenty-fifth Knesset for Likud in the 2022 elections.

He previously served as deputy mayor of Netanya.

== Biography ==
Eli Dellal was born to Reuven, an immigrant from Iraq. He is a mechanical engineer by education and has a master's degree in management and public policy from Tel Aviv University. In 1981-1982 he headed the university's student union, and during this period he began his activities in the Likud party.

He was the CEO of the Municipality of Netanya and the Netanya Development Company. In preparation for the local government elections in 2008, he teamed up with Miriam Fierberg - mayor of the city on behalf of the Likud since 1998, to establish a new party called "Netanya One", which at the time recorded an achievement of a third of the seats in the council (9 out of 27) In the following election campaigns as well, the party ran in a similar format and won similar achievements.

Until his election to the Knesset in 2022, Dellal was Fierberg's deputy and fill-in, in charge of transportation, emergency preparedness, industrial zones and business development and head of committees for road safety, preservation of sites, finances and commemoration of the victims of terrorism. In addition, he is a member of the executive board of the Netanya Academic College and its board of trustees and the Friends of Meir Medical Center association. In the preliminary elections for the elections to the twenty-fifth Knesset, he ran for the Likud list on behalf of the Mishor Ha'am district, defeated the Likud Comptroller Shai Galili and placed 29th, and was elected to the Knesset. In the 25th Knesset, Dellal serves as the chairman of the committee for the rights of the child and a member of the finance committee and the committee for the advancement of women's status and gender equality.

== Personal life ==
Dellal is married to lawyer Esther Dellal and has three children, two of whom are engineers and one is an accountant. He lives in Netanya. Bicycling and cooking enthusiast, and even appeared in the eighth season of MasterChef (2019).

== See also ==
- List of members of the twenty-fifth Knesset
