= Netanel Haik =

Israeli politician

- נתנאל חיאק

Personal details
- Born: 17 September 1981 (age 44) Rekhasim, Israel

Netanel Ephraim Haik (Hebrew: נתנאל חיאק; born 17 September 1981) is an Israeli politician who served as the leader of Shas in Haifa.

== Early life ==
Haik was born in Rekhasim and studied in yeshivas in Haifa, Kiryat Ye'arim and at the Mir Yeshiva in Jerusalem. He then married, returned to Rekhasim, and studied at Knesses Chizkiyahu, before establishing his own yeshiva in 2012.

== Political career ==
=== Local Politics ===
In 2013, Haik was elected to Rekhasim's local council as a member of Shas. He served on the council from 2013 until 2018.

Ahead of the 2018 municipal elections, Haik was appointed leader of Shas in Haifa by Aryeh Deri, and given the second spot on the party's electoral list for the city council. Haik was not elected to the council as the party only won a single seat.

=== National Politics ===
During the 2015 Israeli legislative election, Haik managed Shas's Northern Israel campaign headquarters, and was given the 47th spot on the party's electoral list. In 2016, Haik was made a parliamentary advisor to Ya'akov Margi.

Haik was given the 14th spot on Shas's electoral list ahead of the April 2019 and 2020 elections, the 15th spot ahead of the September 2019 election, the 12th spot ahead of the 2021 election, and the 13th spot ahead of the 2022 election, a place on the list he resigned from on 23 January 2023. Haik was not elected during this period.

== Personal life ==
Haik is married and has seven children.
