= Moshe Passal =

Israeli politician

- משה פסל
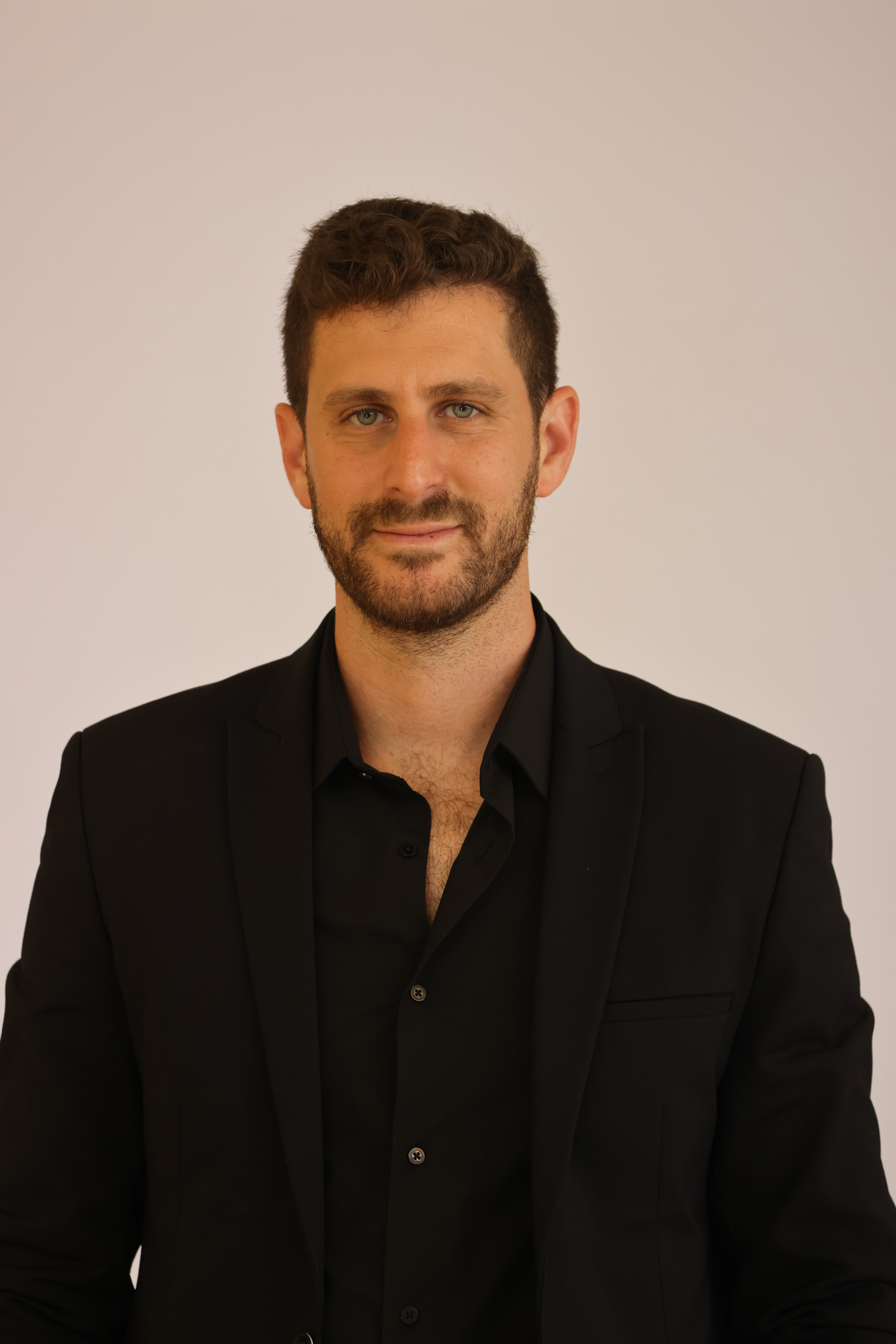

Faction represented in the Knesset
- 2023–2026: Likud

Personal details
- Born: Nehalim, Israel

Moshe Passal (Hebrew: משה פסל; also known as Moshiko Passal) is an Israeli politician who served as a Member of the Knesset for Likud from 2023 until 2026.

== Biography ==
Passal was born in Nehalim and studied at a yeshiva. In 2018, he participated in a season of Big Brother.

Passal ran in Likud primaries ahead of the April 2019 Israeli legislative election, seeking election to the 34th spot on the party list, which reserved for young candidates, but was defeated by May Golan. He was ultimately assigned the 52nd spot and was not elected. He was later given the 54th spot ahead of the September 2019 election. Passal ran for the party list again ahead of the 2022 election, and won the 40th spot. He was not elected, but entered the Knesset on 12 March 2023 as a replacement for Galit Distel-Atbaryan, who resigned under the Norwegian Law.
