= Erez Malul =

Israeli politician

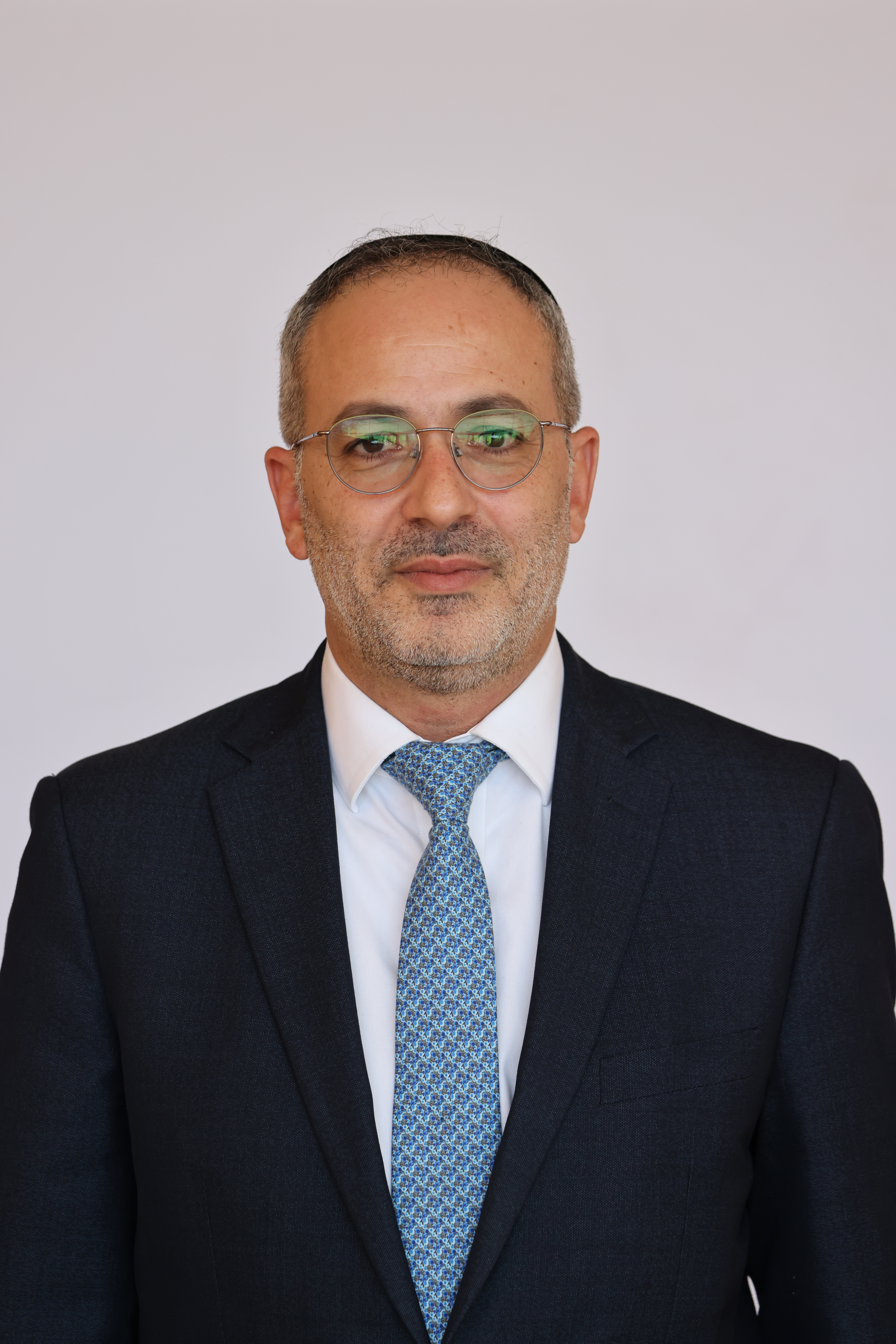
- Malul in 2023

Faction represented in the Knesset
- 2023–2025: Shas
- 2026: Shas

Personal details
- Born: 22 November 1973 (age 52)
- Spouse: Gila Malul
- Children: 6
- Education: Ono Academic College
- Occupation: Jurist • Politician

Erez Malul (Hebrew: ארז מלול; born 22 November 1973) is an Israeli politician who served as a member of the Knesset for Shas from 2023 until 2025 and again in 2026.

== Biography ==
Malul was born on 22 November 1973. He studied in two Yeshivas in Jerusalem, and acquired a master's degree in law. He subsequently worked as an advisor to Minister of Religious Services David Azulai, before becoming the ministerial director's chief of staff. In 2017, Malul was questioned by police as part of an investigation of Aryeh Deri.

Ahead of the 2021 Israeli legislative election, Malul was given the thirteenth spot on Shas' party list, but was not elected. Ahead of the 2022 election, he was given the list's fourteenth spot, and was not elected as the party won eleven seats. However, he entered the Knesset on 2 February 2023 under the Norwegian Law.

He left the Knesset in July 2025, but returned in May 2026 as a replacement for Moshe Arbel.

== Personal life ==
Malul is married and has six children.
