= Muhammad Abu Elhega =

Arab-Israeli educator (born 1988)

Faction represented in the Knesset
- 2026: Yesh Atid

Personal details
- Born: 22 November 1988 (age 37) Tamra, Israel

Muhammad Abu Elhega (born 22 November 1988) is an Arab-Israeli educator, public activist and Israeli politician who served as a member of the Knesset for Yesh Atid during 2026. He heads the Arab headquarters within the party and is the founder of the Atidna youth movement, which defines itself as an Arab-Zionist youth organization.

== Biography ==
Abu Elhega was born and raised in Tamra. He has a bachelor's degree in law from the University of Haifa. He founded Atidna, the first Arab Zionist youth movement in Israel. He also served as head of the informal education department at the Tamra municipality.

=== Political career ===
Abu Elhega is the head of Arab headquarters for Yesh Atid.

He was given the 29th slot on Yesh Atid's electoral list in the 2022 Knesset election, but was not elected as the party won 24 seats. He became a member of the Knesset on 28 July 2026 following the resignation of Ron Katz.

=== Personal life ===
Abu Elhega is married and has three daughters. He is a Sunni Muslim.
