= Mickey Levy =

Israeli politician, former police officer, and former Speaker of the Knesset

- מיקי לוי
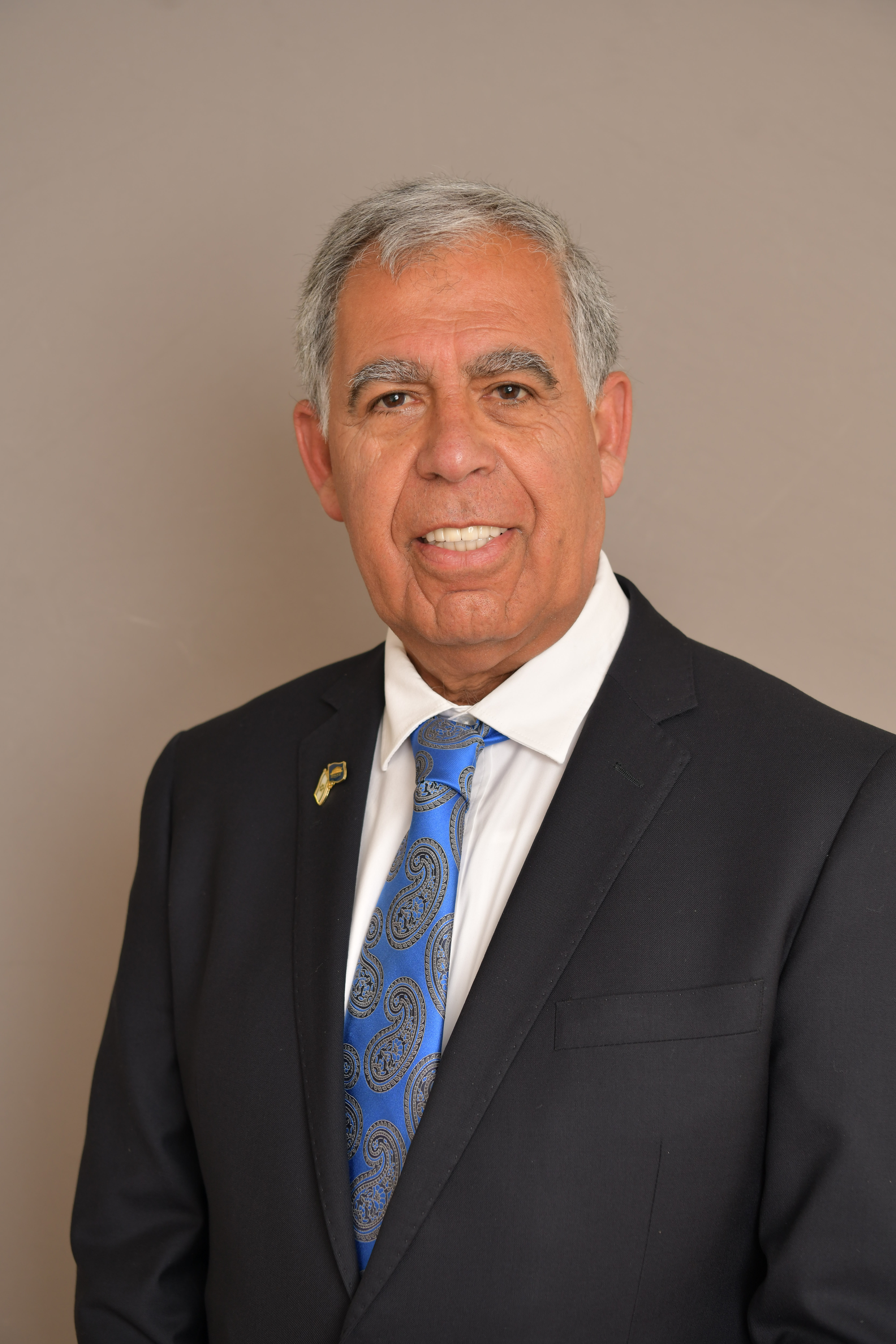

Speaker of the Knesset
- In office 13 June 2021 – 13 December 2022
- Preceded by: Yariv Levin
- Succeeded by: Yariv Levin

Faction represented in the Knesset
- 2013–2019: Yesh Atid
- 2019–2020: Blue and White
- 2020–2026: Yesh Atid

Ministerial roles
- 2013–2014: Deputy Minister of Finance

Personal details
- Born: 21 June 1951 (age 75) Jerusalem, Israel

Mickey Levy (Hebrew: מיקי לוי; born 21 June 1951) is an Israeli politician who was a member of the Knesset for Yesh Atid from 2013 to 2026 and was Speaker of the Knesset during the 24th Knesset (2021-2022). He was Deputy Minister of Finance between 2013 and 2014. Before entering politics he was a police officer.

== Biography ==
Levy was born in Jerusalem to immigrant parents who were of Kurdish Jewish origin from Cizre, Turkey. He did his military service in the Israel Defense Forces in the Paratroopers Brigade. After being discharged from the military, he joined the Israel Police and held a series of command positions. He was head of Jerusalem branch of the Israel Police between 2000 and 2004, winning the Knight of Good Government award in 2002. After retiring he worked as the Israeli police attaché in Washington, D.C. until 2007. He also gained a BA in political science from the University of Haifa and an MEd from the University of Derby, and was CEO of the Egged Ta'avura bus company.

Prior to the 2013 Knesset elections, Levy joined the new Yesh Atid party and was placed eleventh on its list. He entered the Knesset after the party won 19 seats. Following Yesh Atid's coalition agreement with Likud, he was appointed as Deputy Finance Minister. He was placed eleventh on the party's list again for the 2015 elections, and was re-elected as the party won 11 seats.

In the build-up to the April 2019 elections, Yesh Atid joined the Blue and White alliance, with Levy placed twenty-second on its list. He was re-elected as the alliance won 35 seats.

As part of the agreement between Naftali Bennett and Yair Lapid to form a "change" government, Levy was elected Speaker of the 24th Knesset on 13 June 2021, defeating Ya'akov Margi of Shas. Following the 2022 elections Levy was replaced as speaker by Yariv Levin.

Levy, as the chair of the State Control Committee, voted in October 2025 in favor of creating a commission of inquiry on the 7 October attacks, though it was voted down.

He confirmed in August 2026 that he would not run in the 2026 Israeli legislative election, but would remain active in the party.

== Personal life ==
Levy is married to Nurit and has four children and lives in the Mevasseret Zion suburb of Jerusalem.
