= Simon Moshiashvili =

Israeli politician

- סימון מושיאשוילי
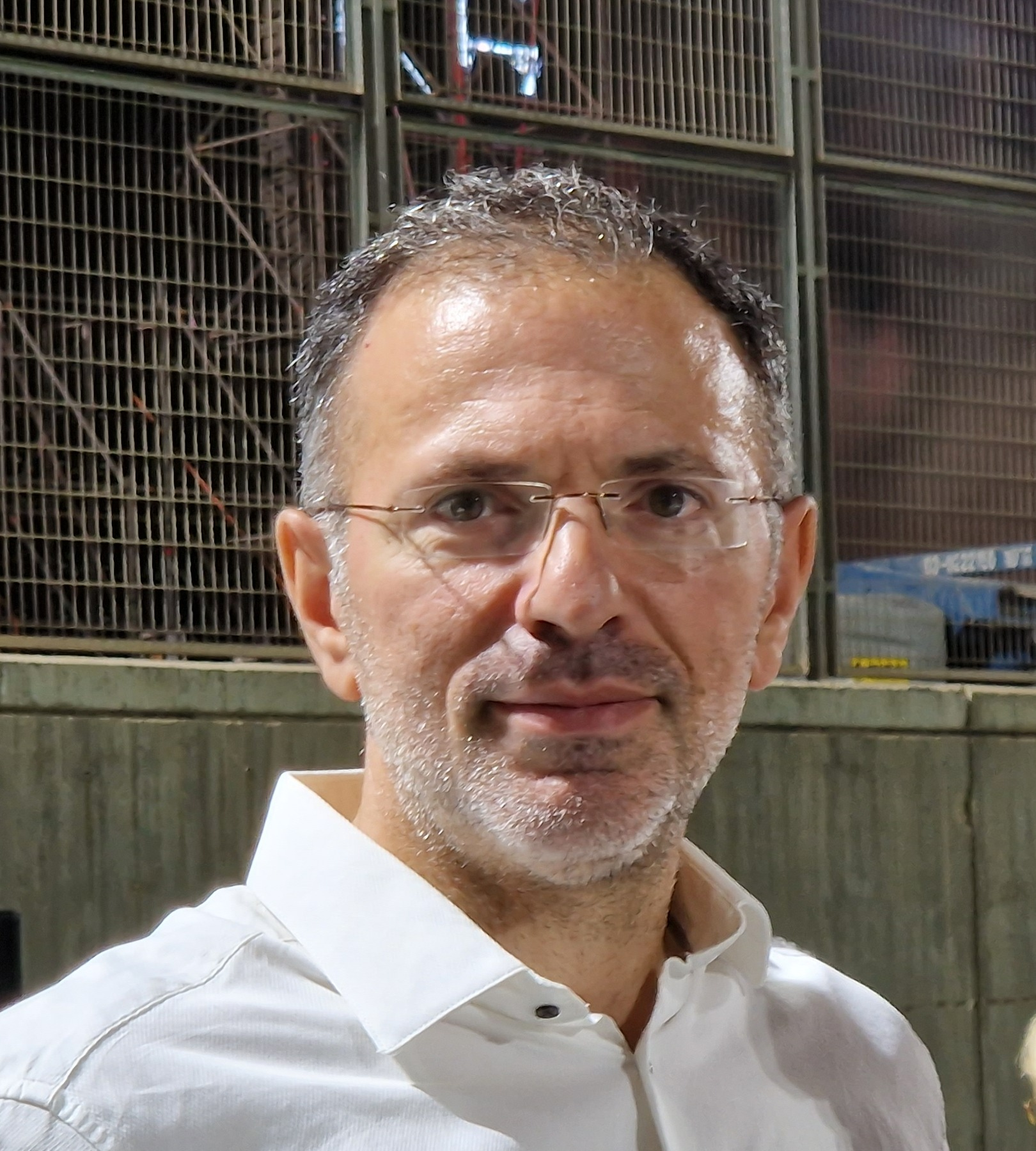

Faction represented in the Knesset
- 2023–2025: Shas

Personal details
- Born: 6 March 1977 (age 49) Israel

Simon Moshiashvili (Hebrew: סימון מושיאשוילי, Georgian: სემიონ მოშიაშვილი) is an Israeli politician who served as a member of the Knesset for Shas from 2023-2025. He previously served as a member of the Kiryat Ata City Council.

== Biography ==
Moshiashvili served in the Israeli Navy, before acquiring a bachelor's degree in law and becoming a practicing lawyer. In 2018, Moshiashvili was elected to Kiryat Ata's city council, leading his own list. In 2021, he was sued by members of the municipal opposition, alongside the city's mayor. He subsequently resigned from the council in February 2021, after receiving the fourteenth spot on Shas' list, ahead of that year's legislative election.

Ahead of the 2022 Israeli legislative election, Moshiashvili was given the list's fifteenth spot, and was not elected as the party won eleven seats. However, he entered the Knesset on 2 February 2023 under the Norwegian Law.

Shas ministers resigned their cabinet positions in July 2025, which resulted in Moshiashvili being replaced in the Knesset by Ya'akov Margi.

== Personal life ==
Moshiashvili is married, and has five children.
