= Sasson Guetta =

Israeli politician

- ששון גואטה
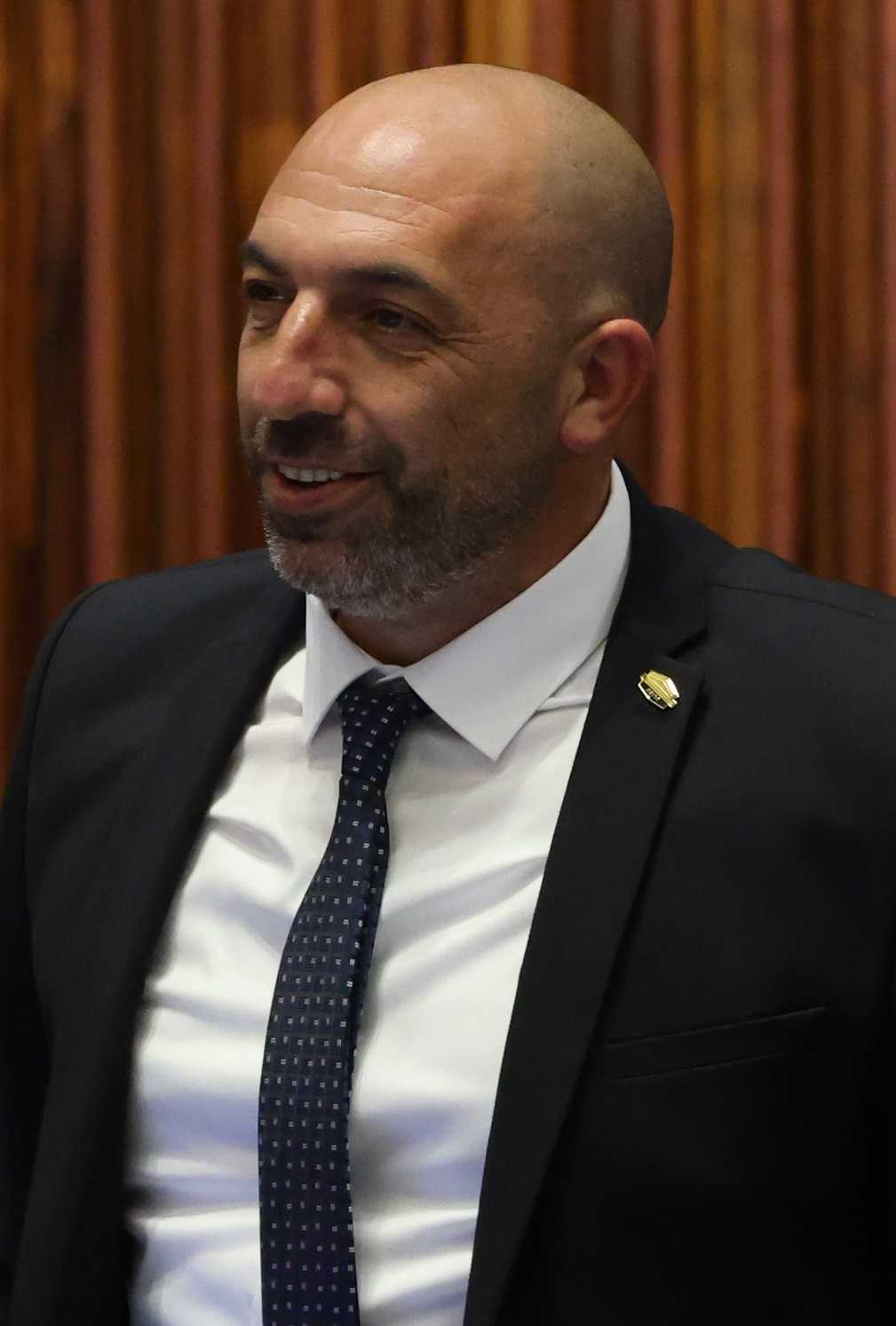

Faction represented in the Knesset
- 2023–2026: Likud

Personal details
- Born: 22 May 1980 (age 46)

Sasson Guetta (Hebrew: ששון גואטה, born 22 May 1980) is an Israeli politician who served as a member of the Knesset for Likud from 2023 to 2026.

== Biography ==
Ahead of the 2022 Israeli legislative election, Guetta ran in Likud's party list primaries, seeking to represent the 41st spot on the list, which is reserved for residents of regional councils. He was assigned the spot, but was not elected to the Knesset. He entered the Knesset on 26 March 2023 to replace Yoav Kisch, who resigned under the Norwegian Law.

In October 2024, he attended a conference titled "Preparing to Resettle Gaza" along with nine other Likud MKs, organised by Nachala and advocating for Israeli settlement in the Gaza Strip.

== Personal life ==
Guetta is married and resides in Goren.
