= Adi Azuz =

Israeli activist and politician

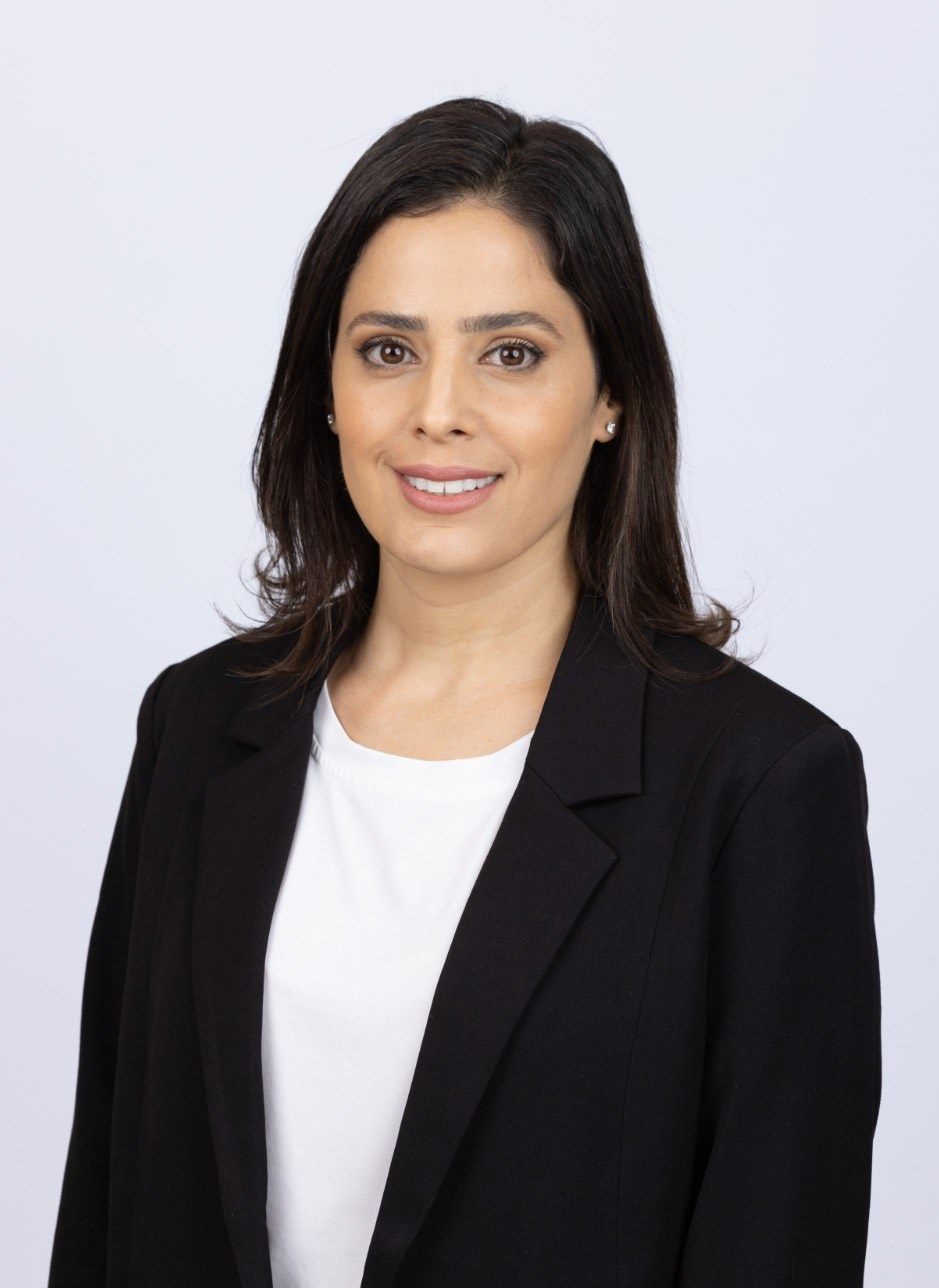

Faction represented in the Knesset
- 2025–2026: Yesh Atid

Personal details
- Born: March 10, 1986 (age 40) Tel Aviv, Israel
- Education: College of Management Academic Studies, Hebrew University of Jerusalem

Adi Aliza Azuz (Hebrew: עדי עזוז; born 10 March 1986) is an Israeli lawyer, activist and politician who served as a member of the Knesset for Yesh Atid from 2025 to 2026.

== Biography ==
Azuz was born in Tel Aviv, and has three siblings. She grew up in Rishon LeZion. Her father died when she was 18, and she moved in with her grandmother. Azuz studied law at the College of Management Academic Studies in Rishon LeZion, and subsequently acquired a master's degree from the Hebrew University of Jerusalem.

In response to the sentencing of sexual offender Yaniv Nachman to community service in 2015, Azuz founded "Tsedek Tsedek Rodfot", an advocacy group calling for increased penalties for sexual offenses. That year, she led a forum to promote the adoption of Security Council Resolution 1325, which aims to protect women in armed conflict.

Azuz later held senior roles in Alut, a nonprofit for parents of children with autism. In 2021, she became the CEO of The Women's Courtyard, which operates open spaces for young women in distress.

After Yair Lapid became Prime Minister of Israel in 2022, he appointed Azuz an advisor on people with disabilities. Ahead of the 2022 Knesset election, Azuz was assigned the 27th slot on Yesh Atid's electoral list, but was not elected as the party won 24 seats. She entered the Knesset on 13 August 2025 following the resignation of Idan Roll.

== Personal life ==
Azuz was formerly married to Israeli chef Yuval Ben-Neriya. The couple has two children.
