= Shelly Tal Meron =

Israeli politician

- שלי טל מירון
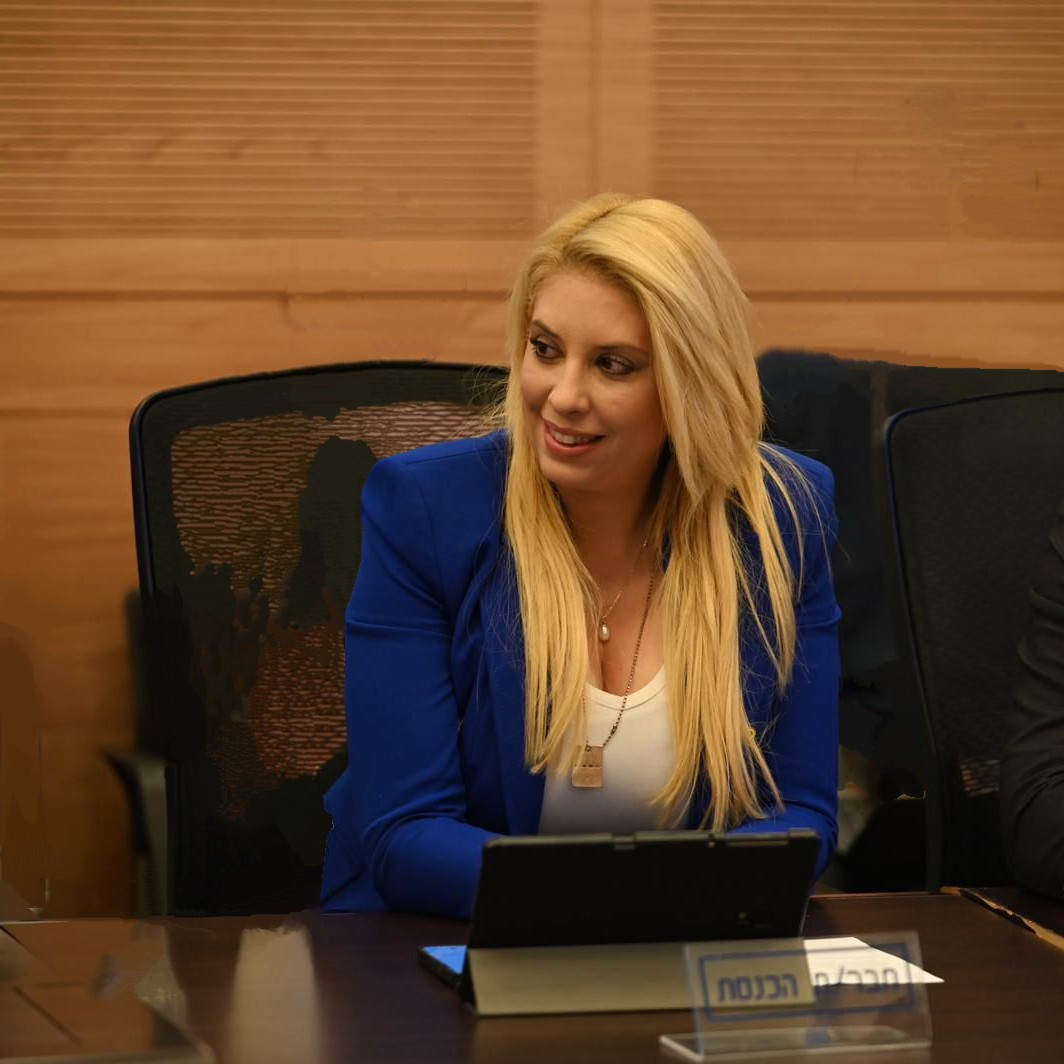

Faction represented in the Knesset
- 2023–2026: Yesh Atid

Personal details
- Born: 6 May 1979 (age 47) Jerusalem, Israel
- Party: Yesh Atid

Shelly Tal Meron (Hebrew: שלי טל מירון; born 6 May 1979) is an Israeli politician who served as a member of the Knesset for Yesh Atid from 2023 until 2026.

== Biography ==
Meron was born in Jerusalem to an American Jewish mother and an Iraqi Jewish father. She served in the Israeli Air Force for six years in various roles, including as a spokesperson, a flight instructor for Bell AH-1 Cobra pilots, and as an officer. She also worked for a technology company in Southeast Asia.

In the 2018 municipal elections, Meron ran for a seat on Tel Aviv City Council on the Yesh Atid Ticket, but was not elected.

She subsequently became the manager of Yesh Atid's campaign in central Israel. Ahead of the 2022 election for the Knesset, Meron was given the twenty-fifth spot on Yesh Atid's list, but was not elected as the party won twenty-four seats. However, she entered the Knesset on 1 February 2023 following the resignation of Yoel Razvozov.

== Personal life ==
Meron has a Bachelor's degree in political science from Tel Aviv University. She is married and has two children.
