= Avraham Betzalel =

Israeli rabbi and politician

- אברהם בניהו בצלאל
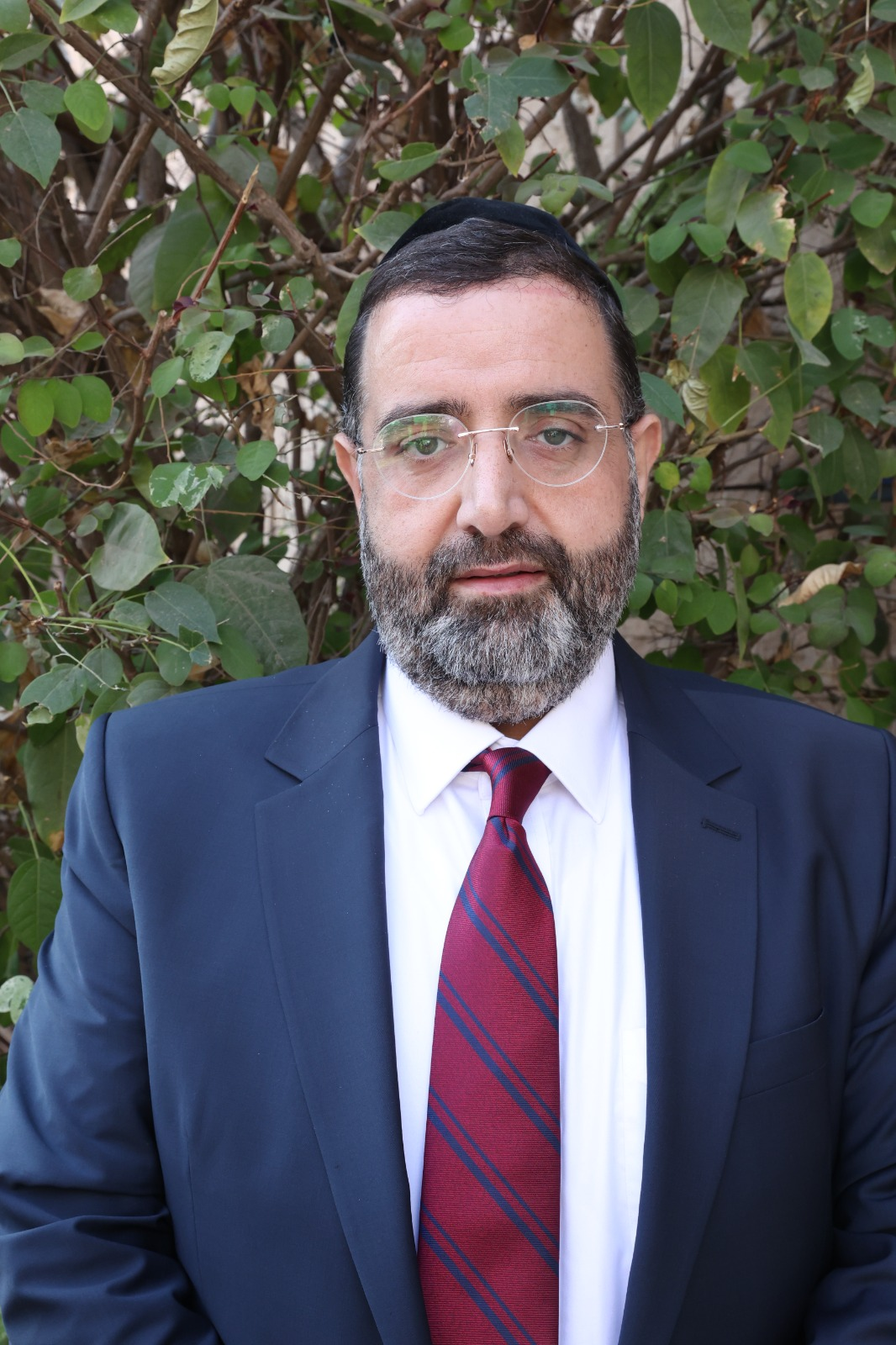

Faction represented in the Knesset
- 2022–2025: Shas

Personal details
- Born: 29 November 1980 (age 45)

Avraham Beniyahu Betzalel (Hebrew: אברהם בניהו בצלאל; born 29 November 1980) is an Israeli politician who served as member of the Knesset for Shas from 2022 until 2025.

== Career ==
Betzalel was elected to the Knesset in 2022 and was appointed in February 2023 as the chair of a special committee in the Knesset called Bridging Social Gaps in the Periphery.

In January 2025 he was one of eight members of the Foreign Affairs and Defense Committee to call on Defense Minister Israel Katz to order the IDF to destroy all water, food and energy sources in the Gaza Strip.

He resigned from the Knesset in July 2025 and was replaced as head of the committee in August 2025 by Michael Malchieli.
