= Debbie Biton =

Israeli politician

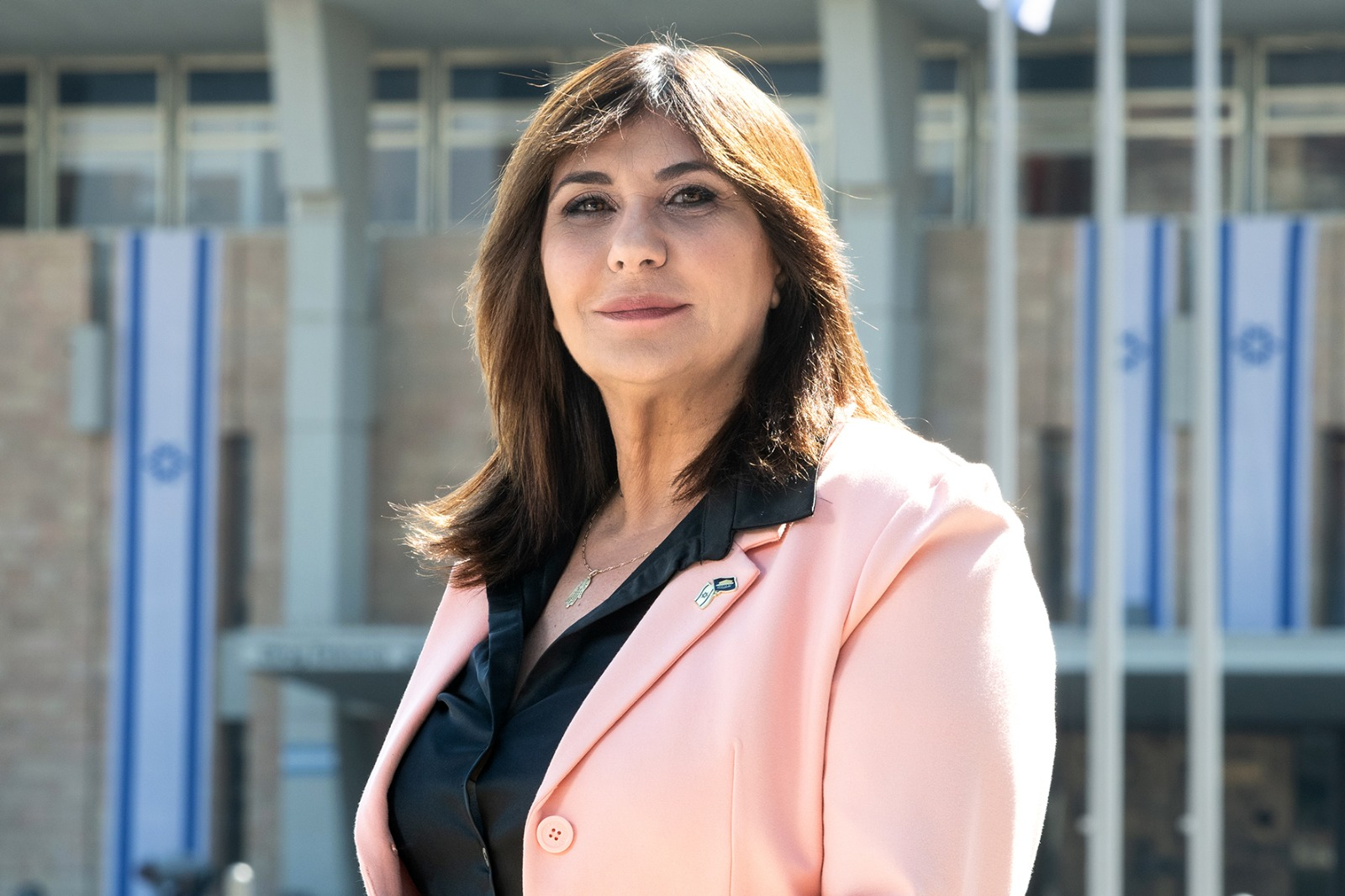

Faction represented in the Knesset
- 2022–2026: Yesh Atid

Personal details
- Born: 25 June 1965 (age 61) Sderot, Israel

Dvora "Debbie" Biton (Hebrew: דבורה "דבי" ביטון; born 25 June 1965) is an Israeli lawyer and politician who served as a member of the Knesset for Yesh Atid from 2022 until 2026.

== Biography ==
Biton was born in Sderot on 25 June 1965. She has a master's degree in law and worked for a time as a lawyer.

Biton served as Yesh Atid's leader in Sderot beginning in 2013. In 2013 she ran for the mayoralty of Sderot, finishing in last place with 3.5% of the vote. She was placed thirty-seventh on the Yesh Atid for the 2015 Knesset elections, but failed to be elected. In the 2018 municipal elections she ran for Sderot's City Council at the head of a local party list, which received only 585 and failed to win a seat. She was forty-ninth on the joint Blue and White list for the April 2019 elections, but again missed out.

Prior to the 2022 Knesset elections Biton was placed twenty-first on the Yesh Atid list, and was elected to the Knesset as the party won 24 seats.

On 1 September 2026 Biton announced that she would not compete in the 2026 election but would remain a member of Yesh Atid.

== Personal life ==
Biton is married, has three children and resides in Sderot.
