= Ron Katz =

Israeli lawyer and politician

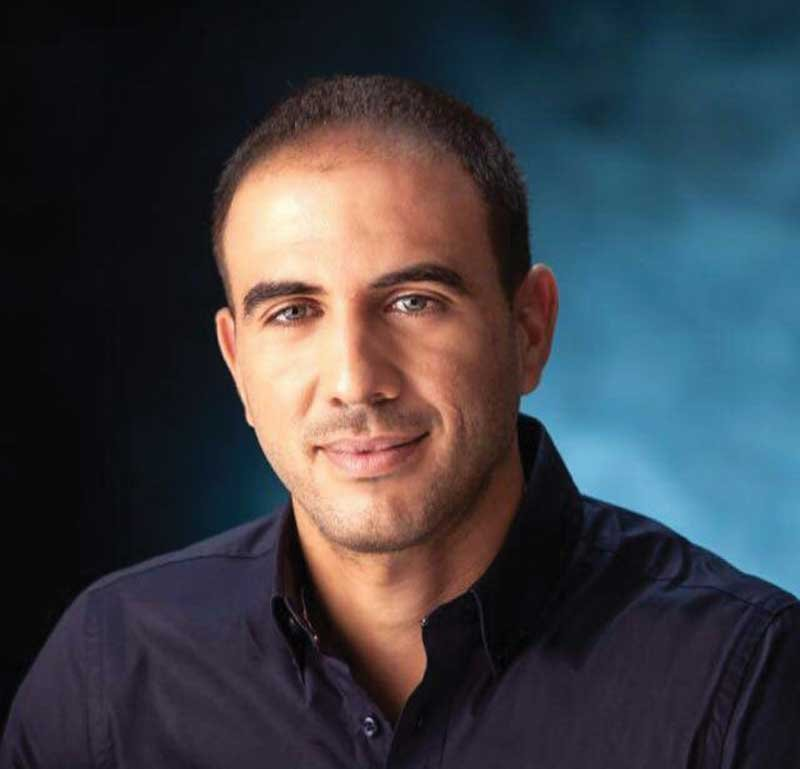
- Katz in 2019

Faction represented in the Knesset
- 2021–2026: Yesh Atid

Personal details
- Born: 4 October 1985 (age 41) Afula, Israel

Ron Katz (Hebrew: רוֹן כַּץ; born 4 October 1985) is an Israeli lawyer and politician. He served as a member of the Knesset for Yesh Atid from 2021 until 2026.

== Biography ==
Katz was born in Afula in 1985. During his national service in the Israeli Defence Forces, he served in the Military Advocate General. After earning an LLB, he later worked as a civilian lawyer, specialising in family law and wills.

After joining Yesh Atid, Katz became a party activist in Petah Tikva, where he served as deputy mayor. He also headed the city's education administration. Prior to the 2021 Knesset elections he was placed sixteenth on the Yesh Atid list, and was elected to the Knesset as the party won seventeen seats.

Katz announced his resignation from the Knesset in July 2026 ahead of the October 2026 elections. He was replaced by Muhammad Abu Elhega on 28 July 2026.
