= Roni Malkai =

Israeli politician

Faction represented in the Knesset
- 2026: Yesh Atid

Personal details
- Born: Wufargif, Welkait, Ethiopia

Roni Fantanesh Malkai is an Israeli politician who served as a member of the Knesset for Yesh Atid in 2026.

== Biography ==
Malkai, an Ethiopian Jew who made aliyah from Ethiopia to Israel in 1980, and served as the chair of the Public Committee at the Israel Electric Corporation.

== Political career ==
Malkai was appointed as Elazar Stern's replacement in the Knesset after his resignation from Yesh Atid took effect in September 2026.
