= Dudi Amsalem =

Israeli politician (born 1960)

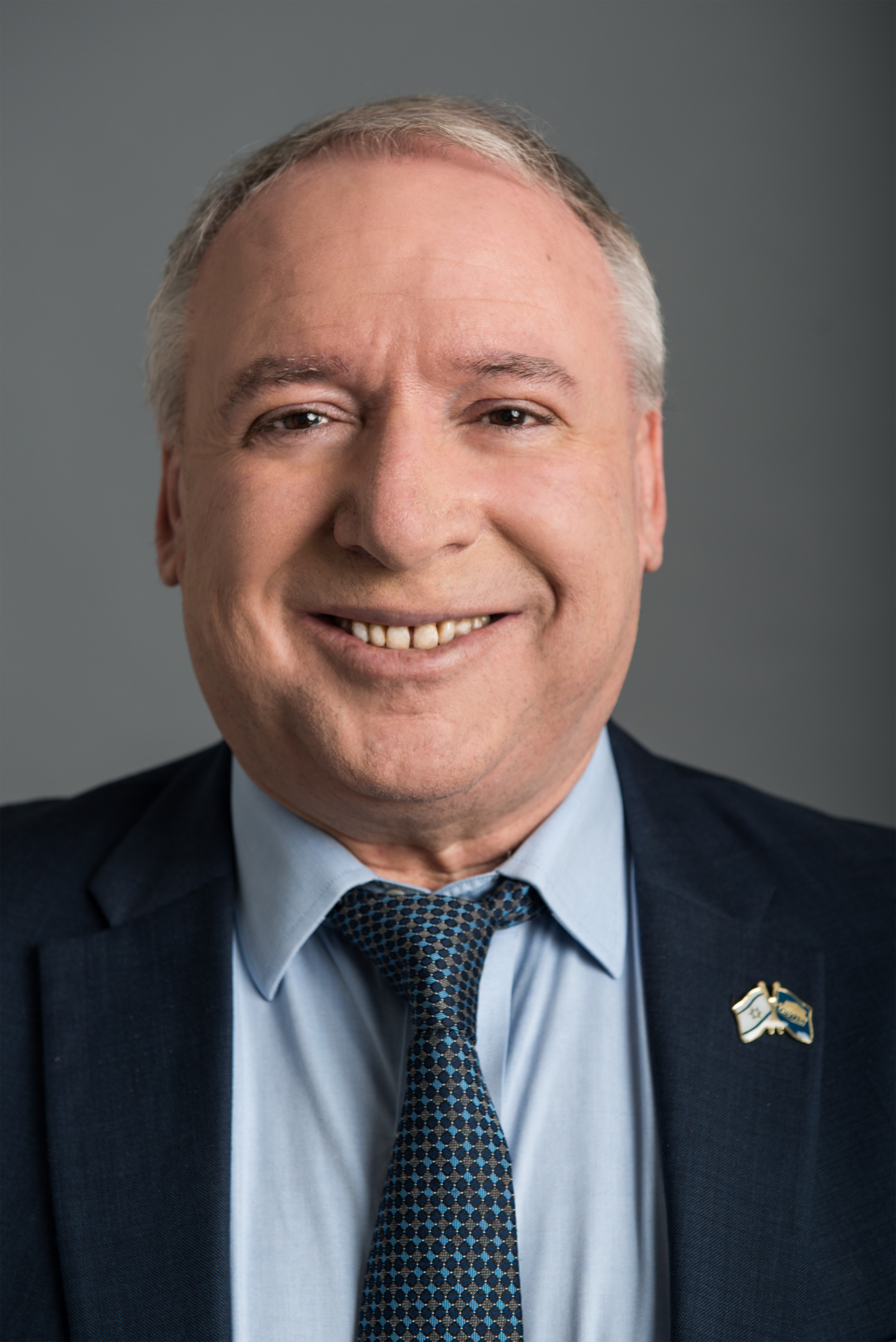
- Amsalem in 2018

Ministerial roles
- 2019–2020: Minister of Communications
- 2020–2021: Minister for Cyber and National Digital Matters
- 2023–: Minister for Regional Cooperation

Faction represented in the Knesset
- 2015–2023: Likud

Personal details
- Born: 11 August 1960 (age 66) Jerusalem, Israel

David "Dudi" Amsalem (Hebrew: דָּוִד "דּוּדִי" אַמְסָלֶם; born 11 August 1960), is an Israeli politician. He currently serves as the Regional Cooperation Minister of Israel. He previously held the posts of Minister of Communications, the Minister for Cyber and National Digital Matters and as the Government-Knesset Liaison and was a member of the Knesset for Likud.

== Early life ==
David (Dudi) Amsalem was born and raised in Jerusalem. His parents, Avraham and Sultana Amsalem, were immigrants from Morocco. Amsalem was educated at Yeshivat Or Etzion. During his IDF national service he was a tank commander in the Armored Corps. He later obtained a bachelor's degree in Economics and Business Administration from Bar-Ilan University.

In 2003, the Israeli police arrested members of a group dubbed "The Jerusalem Gang," which included Amsalem, Itzik Kaufman, and Yoram Karshi. They were investigated on suspicion of involvement in forging hundreds of membership forms for the Likud party's Jerusalem branch during a large-scale party registration process. The police recommended that Amsalem and his associates be indicted. The prosecution closed the case due to insufficient evidence.

== Career ==
A member of the Likud, he became chairman of the party's Jerusalem branch. He was placed 42nd on the joint Likud Beiteinu list for the 2013 Knesset elections, but with the alliance winning only 31 seats, he did not become a Knesset member. Prior to the 2015 Knesset elections he was placed 21st on the party's list, a slot reserved for a candidate from the Jerusalem area. He was elected to the Knesset as Likud won 30 seats. In December 2017 he was appointed whip of the governing coalition.

After being re-elected in the April 2019 elections, he was appointed as Minister of Communications on 1 July. He was re-elected in September 2019 and March 2020. In May 2020 he was appointed Minister for Cyber and National Digital Matters. Although he retained his seat in the 2021 elections, Likud went into opposition and he left the cabinet.

Amsalem has a long history of attacking non-Orthodox streams of Judaism. According to Yizhar Hess, executive director of the Conservative-Masorti movement in Israel, "There is no one in Likud who is more hostile to the non-Orthodox movements than Amsalem."

During a 2022 debate on legislation authorizing the hooking up of illegally built homes to the Israeli power grid, an issue that disproportionately impacts Israeli-Arab and Haredi citizens of Israel, Amsalem objected to Ra'am MK Walid Taha speaking Arabic during the legislative session, saying "look at what we’ve gotten to: Two Arabs speaking to each other... You will speak Hebrew here in the Israeli parliament."

After the Likud's victory in the elections to the 25th Knesset and the coalition negotiations to establish the 37th government of Israel, Amsalem demanded to serve as Minister of Justice or Speaker of the Knesset. Prime Minister Netanyahu refused to appoint him to one of these two positions, and offered him to be the Minister of Transportation. As a result, Amsalem refused to serve as a minister in the government, and announced that he would serve as a full member of the Knesset.

On 12 February 2023 the government decided on the addition of Amsalem to its ranks as an additional minister in the Ministry of Justice, the minister for regional cooperation and the liaison minister between the government and the Knesset. His seat was taken by Avihai Boaron.

In August 2023, when asked about attempts to appoint his personal friend and attorney to the board of directors of a state-owned company, Amsalem replied: "that is my job, due to my authority to appoint directors. I put forward people that I know and hold in esteem".

During the Trial of Benjamin Netanyahu, Amsalem said that if Netanyahu were convicted and imprisoned, there would be a civil war in Israel.

== Personal life ==
Amsalem is a widower with two daughters. His wife, Rosy Amsalem worked in the Jerusalem municipality until her death from lung cancer in 2009. He moved to Ma'ale Adumim following his wife's illness, and returned to Jerusalem after she died. At present he is a resident of Ma'ale Adumim.
