= Michal Slawny Cababia =

Israeli politician

- מיכל סלבני כבביה
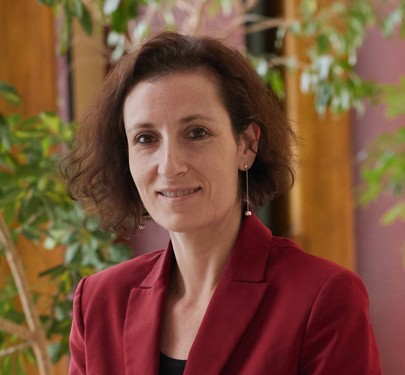
- Slawny Cababia in 2026

Faction represented in the Knesset
- 2026: Yesh Atid

Personal details
- Party: Yesh Atid (since 2012)

Michal Slawny Cababia is an Israeli politician. She served as a member of the Knesset for Yesh Atid in 2026.

== Biography ==
Slawny Cababia made aliyah from the United States in 2008.

== Politics ==
Slawny Cababia joined Yesh Atid in 2012 and served as the head of the party's English division by early 2016. Slawny Cababia was expected to be placed 29th on the party's list ahead of the 2021 Israeli legislative election.

She served as the World Zionist Organization's representative in North America, as of February 2026.

She replaced Yoav Segalovitz on 11 August 2026 after he resigned from the Knesset.
