= Moshe Arbel =

Israeli politician

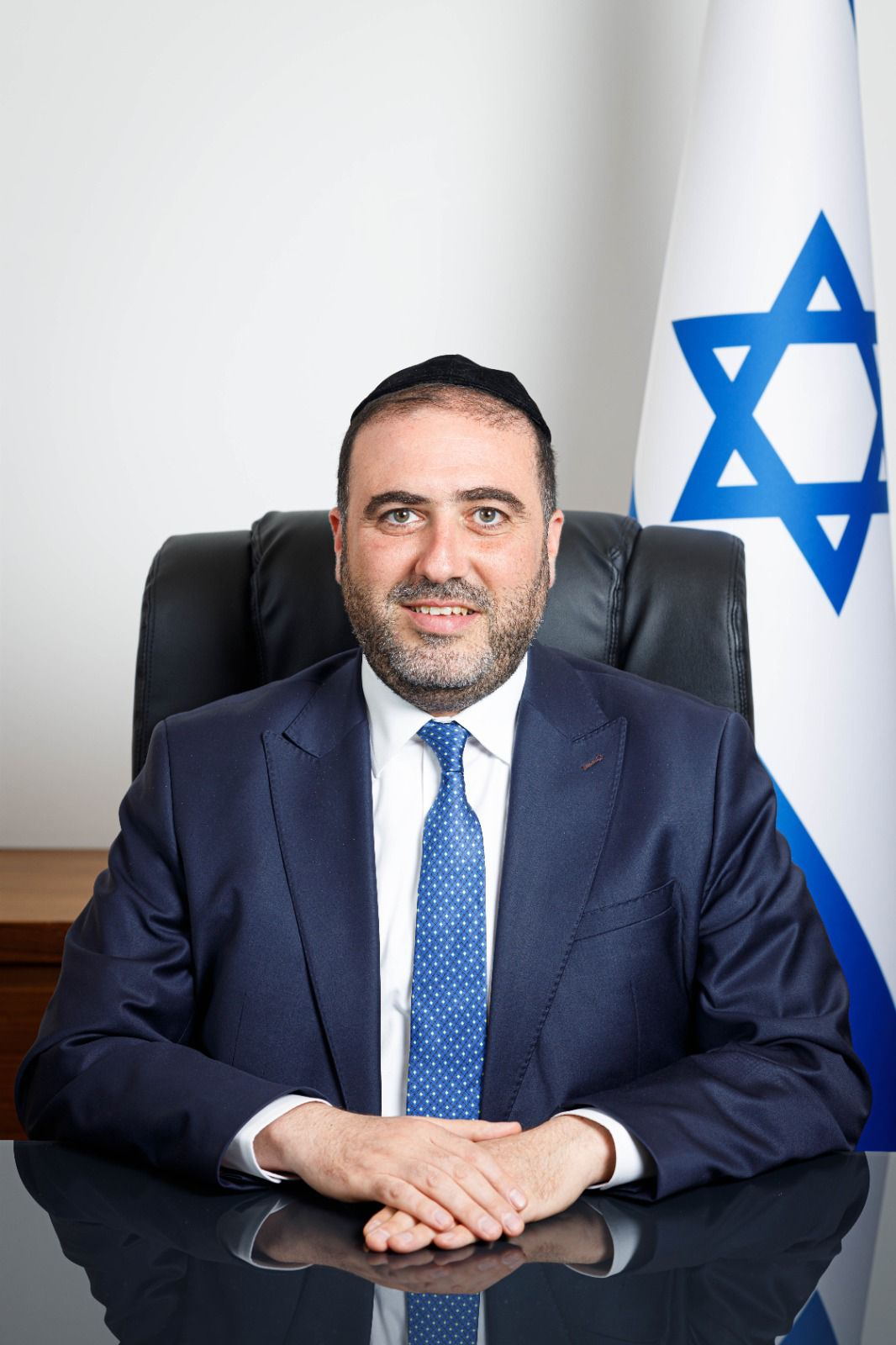
- Arbel in 2023

Ministerial roles
- 2023–2025: Minister of the Interior
- 2023: Minister of Health

Faction represented in the Knesset
- 2019–2026: Shas

Personal details
- Born: 26 December 1983 (age 42) Petah Tikva, Israel

Moshe Arbel (Hebrew: מֹשֶׁה אַרְבֵּל; born 26 December 1983) is an Israeli Haredi rabbi and politician. He previously served as the Minister of Interior, having been appointed a permanent replacement for Aryeh Deri, who was disqualified from holding the offices by the Israeli Supreme Court. Arbel previously served as Minister of Health between April and October 2023, and as a member of the Knesset for Shas between 2019 and 2026.

== Early life ==
Arbel was born to Ilana and Rahmim. His father was deputy chairman of the Petah Tikva religious council and a Shas activist. He was educated at the Sha'arit Yisrael Talmud Torah and the Nahlat David yeshiva. During his national service in the Israel Defense Forces he served in a Home Front Command unit for identifying casualties. He was subsequently ordained as a rabbi, and went on to study law at Ono Academic College. He was a legal intern at Ramla court and carried out reserve duty as a military prosecutor in the Judea and Samaria office of the Military Advocate General.

== Career ==
Between 2006 and 2013 he was director of the Keter Shalom institute. During the term of the nineteenth Knesset (2013–2015), he worked as a legal advisor to the Shas party and for MK Yoav Ben-Tzur. He was placed on the honorary sixty-fifth place on the Shas list for the 2015 Knesset elections. In 2018 he was appointed temporary head of the Ministry of Religious Services due to the illness of minister David Azulai.

In the build-up to the April 2019 Knesset elections he was placed seventh on the Shas list, and was elected to the Knesset as the party won eight seats. Arbel was re-elected in September 2019, 2020, 2021 and 2022.

=== 37th government ===
On 19 April 2023, several months after Shas leader Aryeh Deri was disqualified from holding ministerial posts by the Israeli Supreme court, Arbel was appointed Minister of Interior and Minister of Health in the Thirty-seventh government of Israel. On 12 October 2023, as part of a cabinet reshuffle caused by the Gaza war, Arbel was replaced as Minister of Health by Uriel Buso, remaining only as Minister of Interior.

In May 2024, as the Hezbollah–Israel conflict continues to affect communities in Northern Israel, Arbel as interior minister called on prime minister Benjamin Netanyahu to pass new five-year plans to financially support Druze and Circassian communities "not only to planning and construction" but also in "education, welfare, economic development and more".

Arbel planned to exit the government in July 2025, though he temporarily withdrew his resignation on 17 July. Arbel submitted his resignation again on 20 July. On 17 May 2026, Arbel officially submitted his resignation from the Knesset, and was replaced by former MK Erez Malul on 19 May.

== Personal life ==
Arbel is married to Keren and has five children. He lives in Kfar Ganim in Petah Tikva. He served as a mohel and a rabbi of the Beit Eliyahu congregation in the Em HaMoshavot neighborhood.
