= Yaron Levi =

Israeli judoka and politician (born 1981)

- ירון לוי
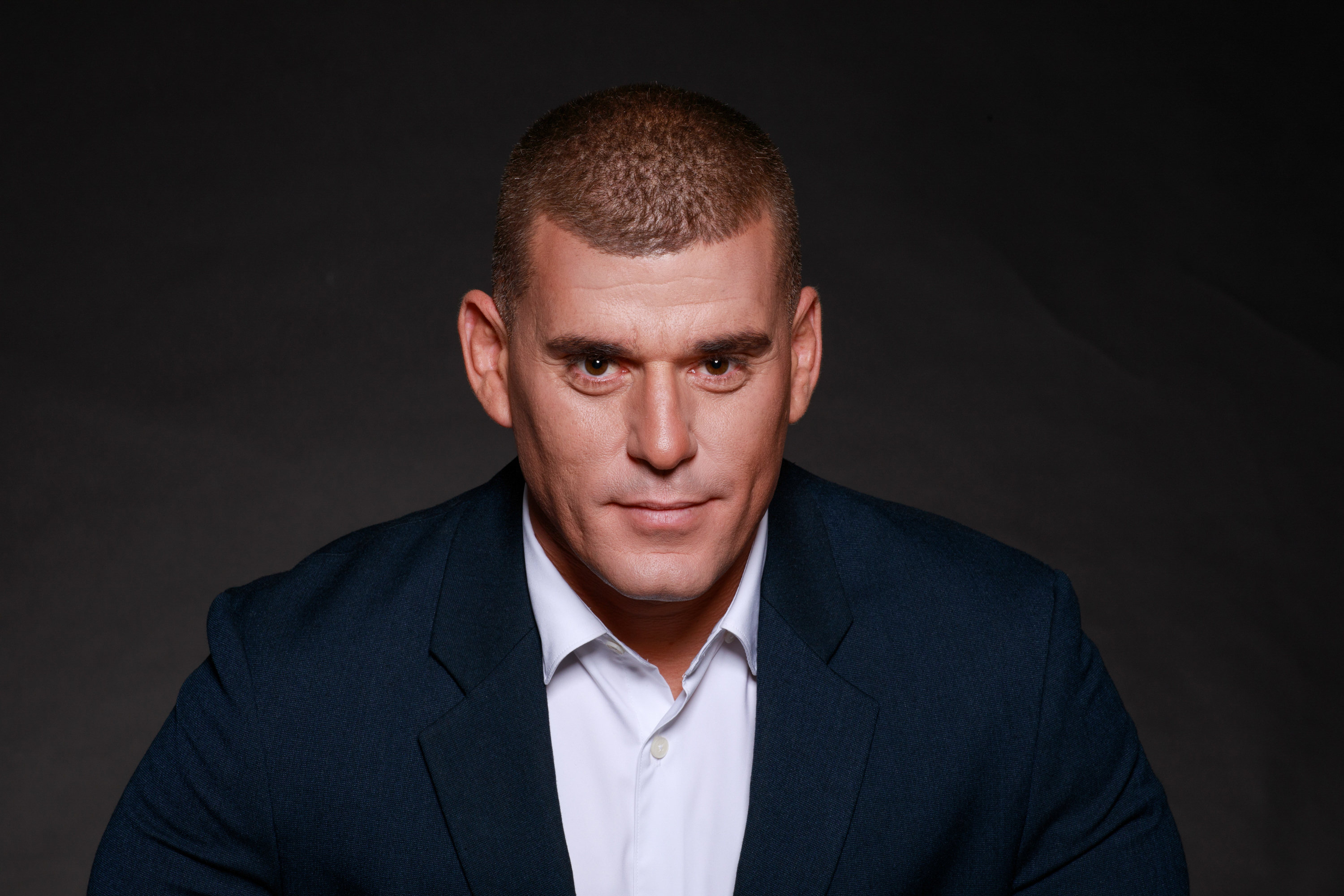

Faction represented in the Knesset
- 2023–2026: Yesh Atid

Personal details
- Born: 29 August 1981 (age 45) Bat Yam, Israel

Yaron Amos Levi (Hebrew: ירון לוי; born 29 August 1981) is an Israeli politician who served as a member of the Knesset for Yesh Atid. He previously served as Deputy Mayor of Bat Yam.

== Biography ==
Yaron Levi was born in Bat Yam on 29 August 1981. Before entering politics, he was a member of the Israeli Judo team, and won both the Israel Judo Championship and the IJF Junior World Tour in 2000, before quitting in 2002 due to injuries.

In 2018, Levy was elected to the Bat Yam City Council as a member of Yesh Atid, and also served as its deputy Mayor, holding the Sports, Young Persons and Beaches portfolios. On 2021 Israeli legislative election, he was placed on 30th spot, but was not elected as Yesh Atid only won seventeen seats. Ahead of the 2022 Israeli legislative election, Levy was assigned the 26th spot on Yesh Atid's electoral list. He was not elected as the party won 24 seats, but entered the Knesset on 1 August 2023 after Orna Barbivai resigned to run for Mayor of Tel Aviv.

In May of 2026, Levi announced he would leave Yesh Atid after the 2026 election and would not seek re-election with the party.

== Personal life ==
Levi is married and has three children.
