= Yoav Kisch =

Israeli pilot and politician

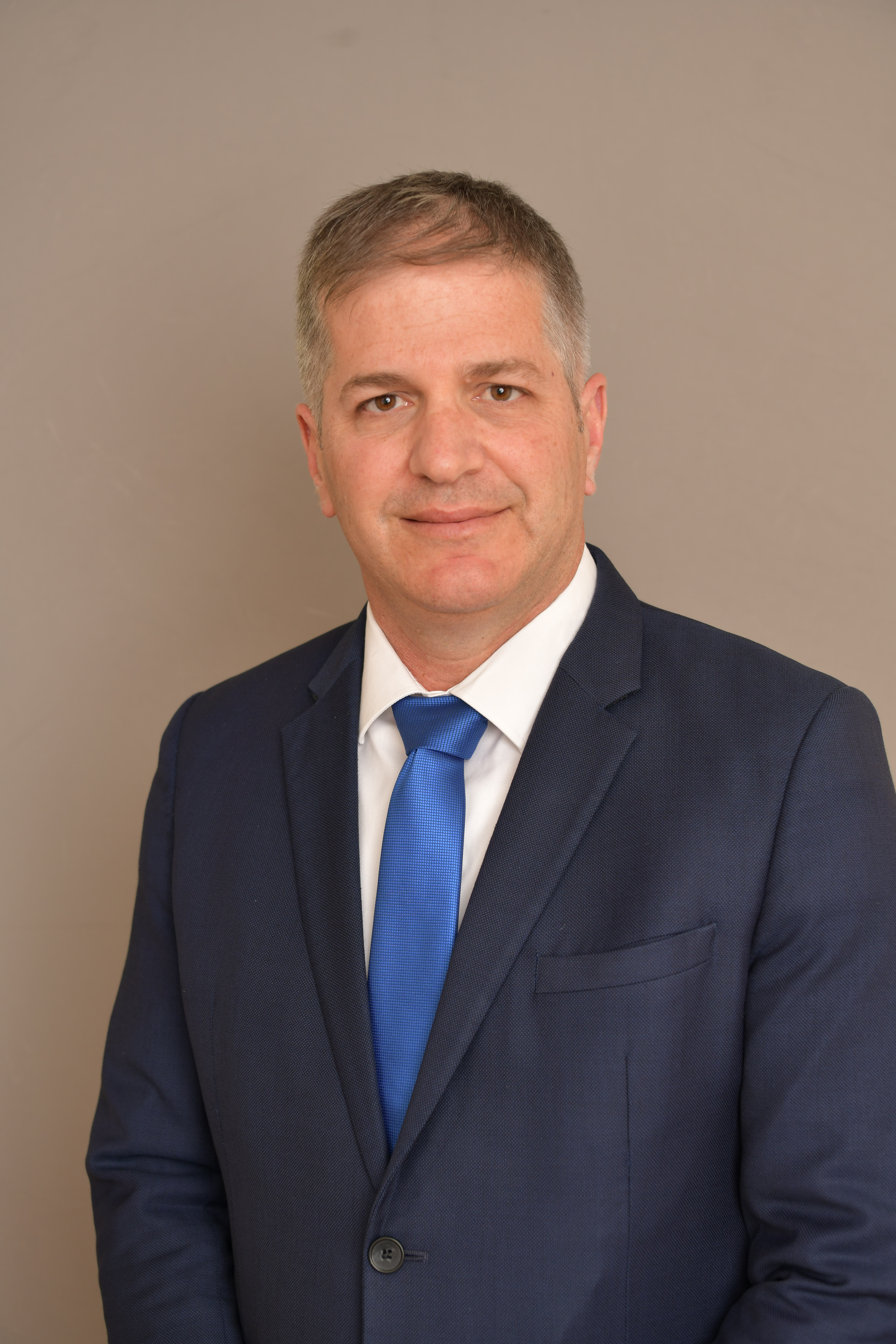
- Kisch in 2021

Ministerial roles
- 2022–: Minister of Education
- 2022–2023: Minister of Regional Cooperation

Faction represented in the Knesset
- 2015–2023: Likud
- 2026–: Likud

Personal details
- Born: 6 December 1968 (age 57) Tel Aviv, Israel

Yoav Kisch (Hebrew: יוֹאָב קִישׁ; born 6 December 1968) is an Israeli politician. Previously a military and then civil pilot, he serves as a member of the Knesset for Likud and previously was an MK from 2015 to 2023. He has been Minister of Education since December 2022. He also held the post of Minister of Regional Cooperation from 2022 to 2023.

== Biography ==
Kisch was born and raised in Tel Aviv. His paternal grandfather was Frederick Kisch, the highest-ranking Jew ever to serve in the British Army. Through his mother, he is a descendant of Shmuel Salant, who served as Ashkenazi Chief Rabbi of Jerusalem in the 19th century. Kisch held British citizenship until having to renounce it in 2015 as a condition of being allowed to take up a seat in the Knesset. He holds an MBA from INSEAD.

Kisch enlisted the IDF's Air force in 1985. He finished his Kurs tais (Flight training) as a fighter pilot in 1988 and began his service on the F-16 Falcon. He finished his reserve duty service in 2016 while climbing up to the rank of Sgan aluf (Lieutenant colonel).

He was on the Likud Yisrael Beiteinu list for the 2013 Knesset elections, but failed to win a seat.

Prior to the 2015 elections he was placed 19th on the Likud list, a slot reserved for the Tel Aviv region. He was elected to the Knesset when Likud won 30 seats.

In March 2017, Amendment 35 to the Party Financing Law was passed, initiated by Kish along with other members of the Knesset. The amendment, known as the "V15 law", stipulates that organizations and individuals who act during elections in order to persuade voters not to vote for a particular list must also register with the State Comptroller of Israel, and that donations they may receive for such activity are limited.

In March 2023 Kisch resigned from the Knesset under the Norwegian Law and was replaced by Sasson Guetta.

== Personal life ==
Kisch is married with three children and lives in Ramat Gan.
