= Ya'akov Margi =

Israeli politician

- יַעֲקֹב מַרְגִּי
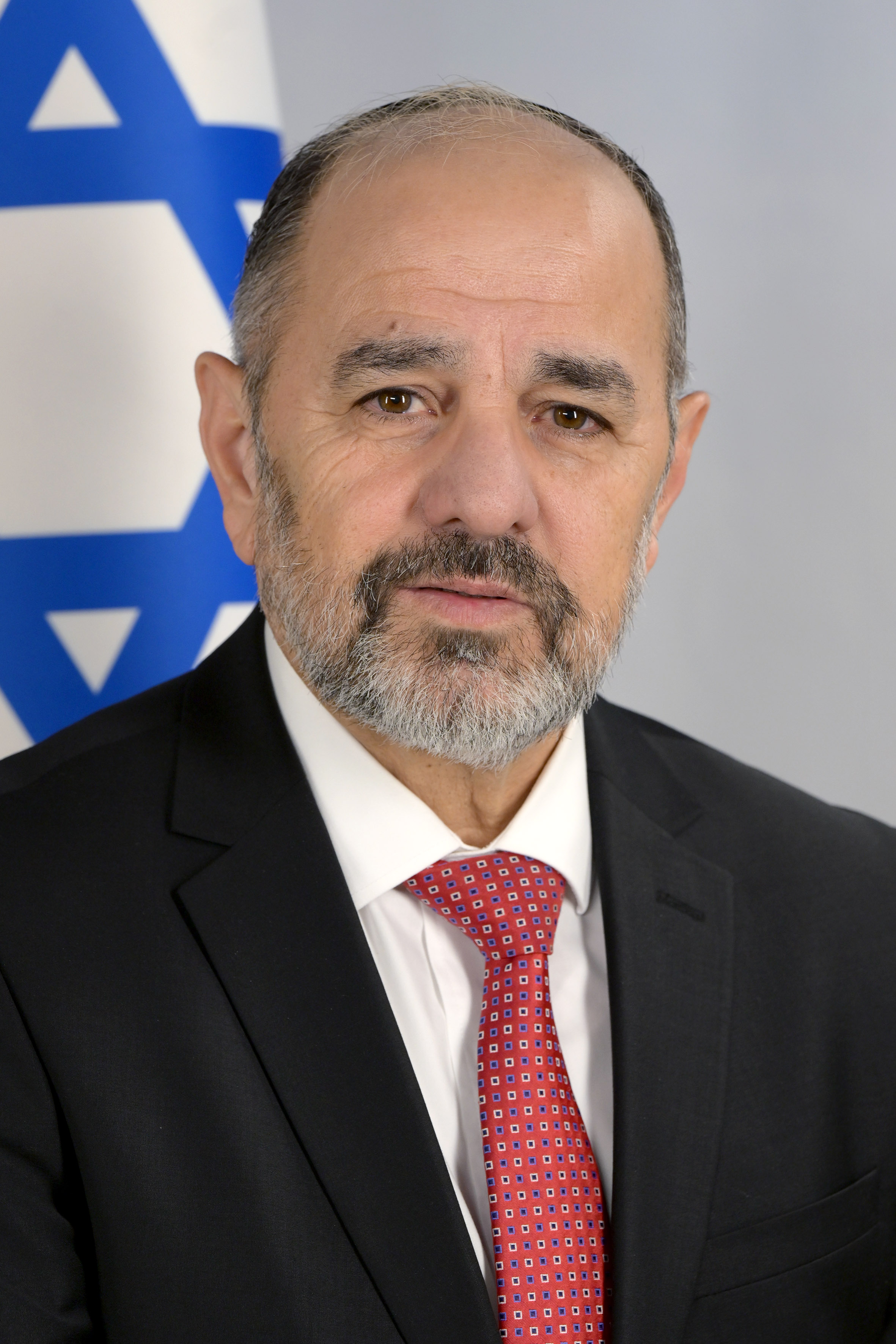
- Margi in 2023

Ministerial roles
- 2009–2013: Minister of Religious Services
- 2022–2025: Minister of Welfare and Social Affairs

Faction represented in the Knesset
- 2003–2026: Shas

Personal details
- Born: 18 November 1960 (age 65) Rabat, Morocco
- Citizenship: Israel
- Spouse: Shoshana Margi
- Children: 2

Ya'akov Margi (Hebrew: יַעֲקֹב מַרְגִּי; born 18 November 1960) is an Israeli politician. He was a member of the Knesset for Shas from 2003 to 2026. He served as the Minister of Welfare and Social Affairs from 2022 until 2025 and as the Minister of Religious Services from 2009 until 2013.

== Biography ==
Yaakov Margi was born in Rabat in Morocco. His family immigrated to Israel in 1962 under the auspices of Operation Yachin. He grew up in Beersheba.

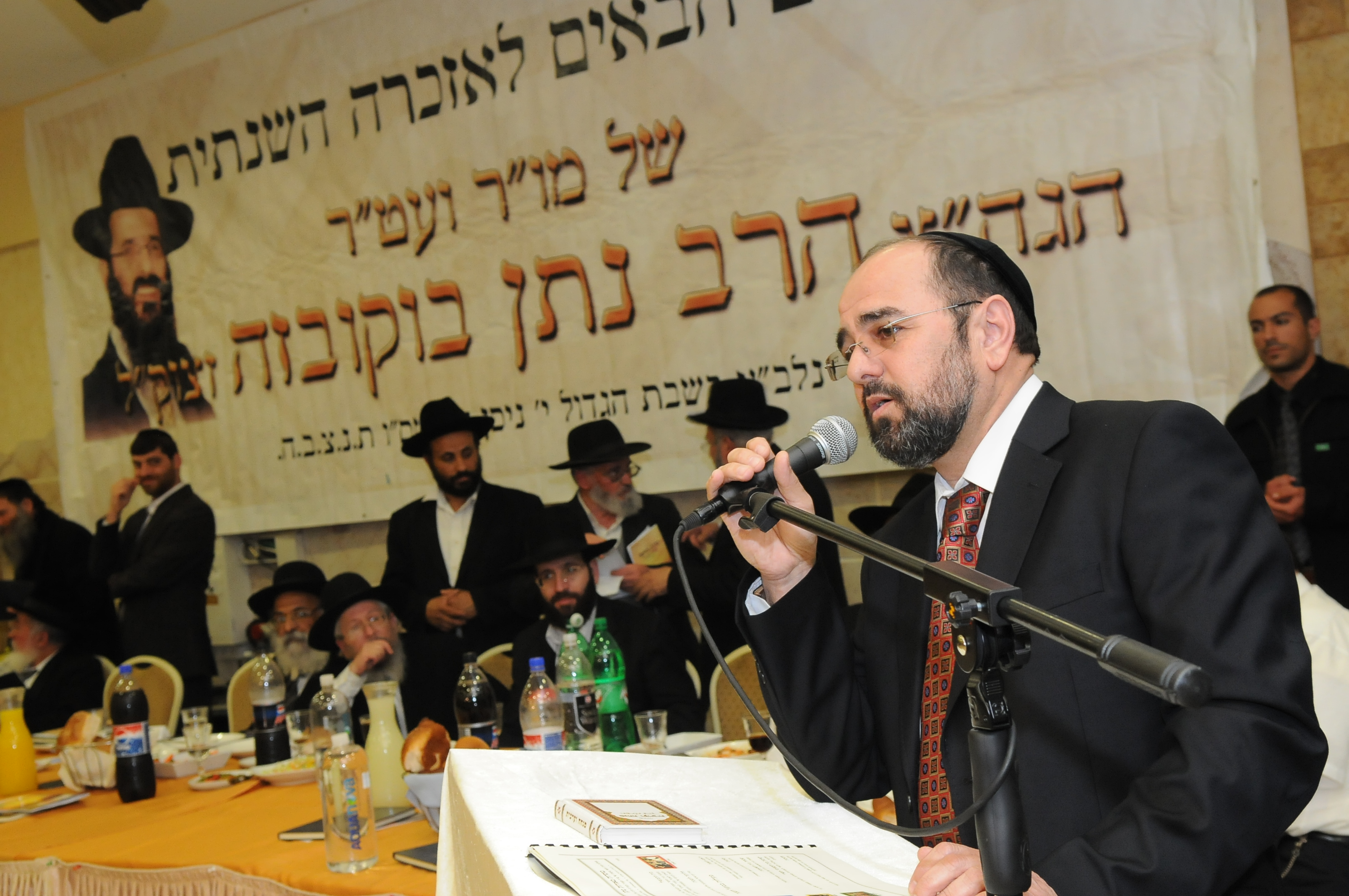
Yaakov Margi speaking at the Hillula of Rabbi Natan Bukobza in Netivot, 2009.

== Political career ==
Margi joined Shas in 1993 at the invitation of Aryeh Deri. Between 1993 and 2003, Margi served as chairman of the local religious council in Beersheba. Since 2001, he has been the director general of Shas. He was first elected to the Knesset in 2003. After retaining his seat in the 2006 elections, Margi served as group chairperson of the party's faction at the Knesset. He also served briefly as chairman of the House Committee.

He retained his seat again in the 2009 elections, having been placed sixth on the Shas list, and was appointed Minister of Religious Services in the Netanyahu government.

In February 2016, Margi visited Crimea, sparking controversy in Israel. Ukraine subsequently opened a criminal investigation against him over the visit.

Margi lives in Sde Tzvi, a moshav in Southern Israel. He is married, and a father of two.

During Pope Benedict XVI's visit to Israel, he wrote a letter to the pontiff demanding that he clearly condemn the purveyors of Holocaust denial and antisemitism.

He was appointed as the Minister of Welfare and Social Affairs in 2022 and served until his resignation in 2025, following Shas' exit from the government.

Margi replaced Simon Moshiashvili in the Knesset upon his return.

In May 2026, Margi announced he would not seek re-election to the Knesset in 2026.
