= Galit Distel-Atbaryan =

Israeli author and politician

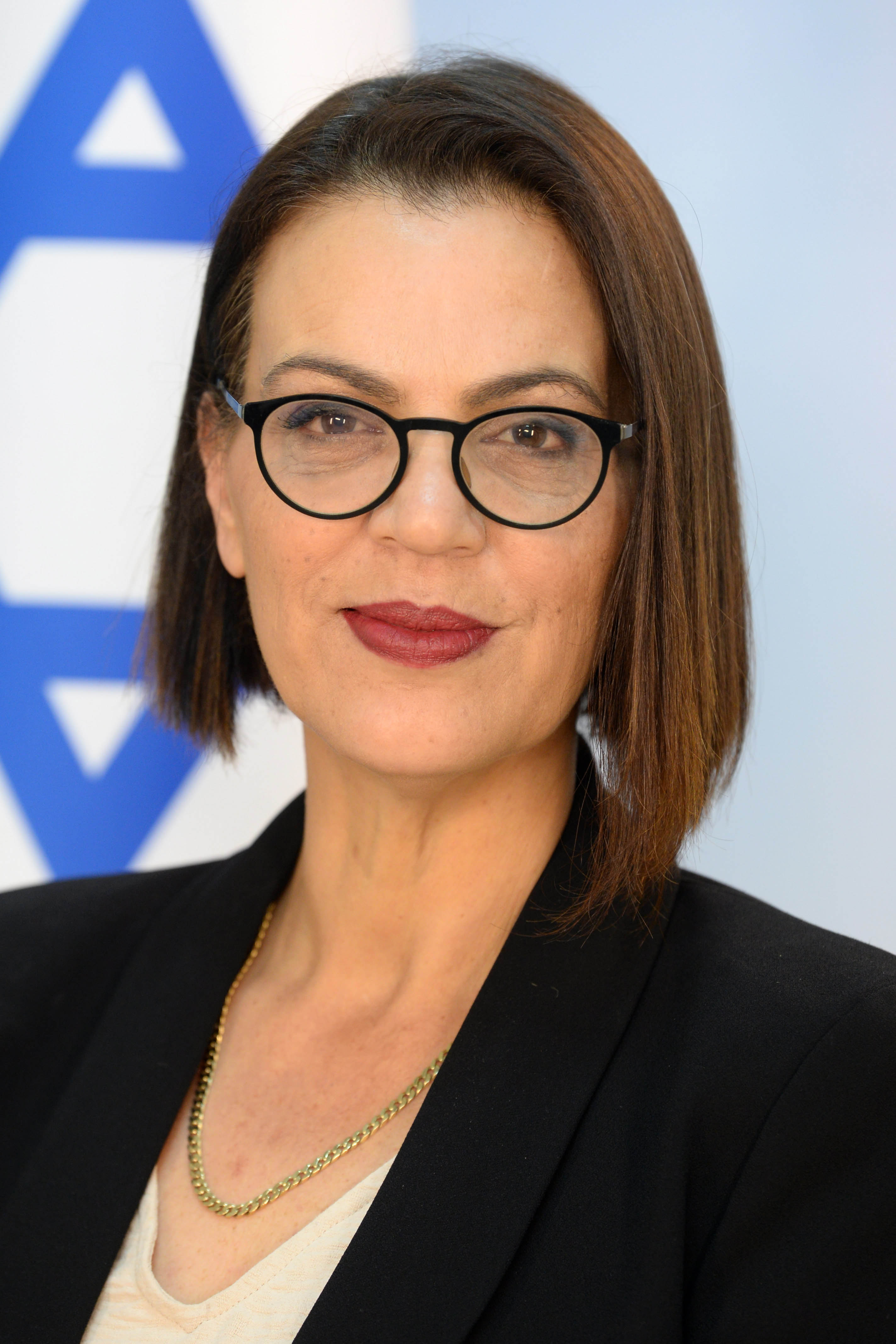
- Distel-Atbaryan in 2023

Ministerial roles
- 2022–2023: Minister of Information

Faction represented in the Knesset
- 2021–2023: Likud
- 2023–2026: Likud

Personal details
- Born: 10 January 1971 (age 55) Jerusalem, Israel

Galit Distel-Atbaryan (Hebrew: גַּלִּית דִּיסְטֶל־אַטְבַּרְיָאן; born 10 January 1971) is an Israeli writer and politician who served as a member of the Knesset for Likud from 2021 to 2026 with a short break during 2023. She was Minister of Information from 2022 to 2023.

== Biography ==
Distel-Atbaryan was born in Jerusalem to Iranian Jewish immigrants and served in the Israeli Air Force. She studied for MA in Philosophy from Hebrew University and had a clothing store named "My Sister" in the Modi'in-Shilat industrial zone.

She lives in the settlement of Kfar HaOranim and has two children.

== Literary career ==
Distel-Atbaryan published her first novel, And If They Told You, in 2009 and her second, Peacock in the Stairwell, in 2014, for which she was nominated for the 2015 Sapir Prize.

She subsequently became a right-wing political commentator, known for her forthright and controversial views and support for Prime Minister Benjamin Netanyahu.

== Political career ==
Distel-Atbaryan was selected by Netanyahu for the tenth place on the Likud list for the 2021 elections, and was elected to the 24th Knesset following the Likud party winning thirty seats in the election.

Ahead of the 2022 elections, she ran in the party's primary election and was placed twentieth in the Likud's list for the 25th Knesset.

In January 2023 she was appointed Minister of Public Diplomacy. She resigned from her position on 12 October 2023.

She strongly criticized Netanyahu in a private WhatsApp conversation, which was released on 16 November 2023.

Distel-Atbaryan announced in May 2026 that she would not seek-re-election in 2026 Likud primaries prior to that year's legislative election.

== Controversy ==
In August 2021, Distel-Atbaryan shared a video on Twitter that falsely suggested United States president Joe Biden fell asleep during a meeting with Israeli prime minister Naftali Bennett, resulting in her tweet being flagged with a Twitter warning of "manipulated media".

In May 2022, she claimed in an interview that "there is no such thing as autism", and shared how she "treated" her autistic son by refusing him food and water until he talked. The comments caused a stir and led to criticism from autistic people and their families.

During the 2023 Israeli anti-judicial reform protests, after reservists from the 69 "Hammers" Squadron boycotted a training operation to protest the proposed judicial changes, Distel-Atbaryan wrote on Twitter that "[p]ilots who condition the security of the citizens on the results of the elections are narcissistic. I'm not interested in what they did for the country", adding that they are "not patriots. Not the salt of the earth. Not Zionists. Not the best of our guys. Not wonderful people. Not the people of Israel."

In March 2023, she claimed that the left relies on foreign funding for its political activities and claimed that funding from foreign nations and actors, including Germany and Iran, was being used to finance protests in Israel. Germany's ambassador to Israel, Steffen Seibert, took issue with Distel-Atbaryan's decision to associate Germany with Iran, a country that openly threatens to annihilate Israel.

After the Hamas attack on Israel in October 2023, Distal-Atbaryan posted on-line: "Erase Gaza from the face of the earth. Let the Gazan monsters rush to the southern border and flee into Egypt, or die. And let them die badly. Gaza should be wiped off the map, and fire and brimstone on the heads of the Nazis in Judea and Samaria. Jewish wrath to shake the earth around the world. We need a cruel, vengeful IDF here. Anything less is immoral." The social media platform, formerly called Twitter, removed her message.

On 12 October, significant public criticism arose regarding the performance of the Public Diplomacy ministry in carrying out its duties. Distal-Atbaryan announced her resignation from the government and her return to the Knesset. A few days later, the government decided to close the ministry and transfer its budget to the Western Negev settlements rehabilitation directorate.

In June 2025, Distel Atbaryan insinuated that Reform Jews were not real Jews. As chair of a Knesset sub-committee on Subcommittee for Jewish Thought in the Education System, Distel Atbaryan ordered The Democrats MK Gilad Kariv, an ordained Reform Rabbi, to be removed from the committee saying, "Remove the Reformist, [the] Jews here want to continue." Prior to ordering Kariv removed, after Kariv discussed women undertaking religious traditions typically done by men, such as laying tefillin, Distel Atbaryan responded "I don’t have the strength for these provocations... If you conduct a bar mitzvah for a dog, I will come and celebrate."
