= 2026 Israeli legislative election campaign =

This article details the campaign ahead of the 2026 Israeli legislative election, which took place in Israel on 27 October 2026.

== Campaign ==
As the campaign officially began in early September 2026, the leading contenders were Likud and Yashar.

=== Amcha Yisrael ===
Amcha Yisrael, a "right-wing party", was launched by Ofer Winter, a former IDF brigadier general, on 25 August 2026. The party is in favor of joining a "broad government made up of Zionist parties" and supports increasing Haredi involvement in the IDF, while the party's slate includes activist Yoseph Haddad and former Jerusalem deputy mayor Fleur Hassan-Nahoum.

=== Blue and White ===
Blue and White leader Benny Gantz outlined his party's position in June 2026 to "put an end to boycotts and the war between blocs" and "form a broad Zionist government without extremists". He also stressed that "Iran is never allowed to revive its nuclear program" and the importance of "preventing Hezbollah and Hamas from rebuilding their military capabilities". In August, Gantz reiterated the priorities of a unity government as "security, service for all, a constitution, and public education" and also ruled out supporting a Netanyahu government. Parties which are in favor of pursuing a unity government are known as the Third Bloc. The party launched an early October campaign emphasizing unity, with Gantz maintaining that he would remain in the race, though the party was below the electoral threshold in polling.

=== The Color Black ===
The Color Black launched its campaign on 28 September 2026 in Bnei Brak at a march which protested against the detention of Haredi draft evaders.

=== The Democrats ===
The Democrats head Yair Golan issued a statement in May 2026 calling for the Zionist opposition to work with Ra'am. Several days later, Golan called for Gadi Eisenkot to either join his party or the Bennett–Lapid alliance, Together, to avoid splitting the vote. The Democrats launched its election campaign in Rabin Square on 25 July 2026 and is working on "key issues" it plans to raise, including "democracy, the rule of law" and the judiciary, ahead of potential coalition negotiations.

=== Haredi Public ===
Haredi Public launched its election campaign on 23 August 2026.

Party head Moti Leitner stated in late October that his party would not withdraw from the election. Tzvika Brot, who headed the election campaign for Likud, met with Leitner on 19 October to pressure him to drop out of the election, offering him a position within the government, if Netanyahu formed a government. Netanyahu himself met with Leitner several days later, to no avail.

=== Joint List ===
The four parties of the 2020 Joint List (Ra'am, Hadash, Ta'al and Balad) signed a preliminary agreement in January 2026 to work toward reviving the alliance, with support from the Arab public. All parties (with the exception of Ra'am) agreed in late August 2026 to run together. Joint List member Ahmad Tibi raised the possibility in a September interview of replacing Speaker of the Knesset Amir Ohana following the election, with the support of the Zionist opposition, in order to control the "parliamentary agenda." He also stated that the Joint List would "do more than" support an opposition candidate for prime minister. Alliance head Yousef Jabareen stated in October that it could provide support for an anti-Netanyahu government, if various conditions (taking on crime, stopping the demolition of houses, and giving legal status to "Bedouin villages in the Negev") were met. Other improvements he called for included "employment, housing and education" and a settlement of the "national and civil rights of Arab Israeli citizens." Various Otzma Yehudit activists, including Mordechai David, went to the party's Tel Aviv headquarters in October and "assaulted activists and teenagers" who were present.

=== Likud ===
Prime Minister Benjamin Netanyahu, of Likud, has warned against voters supporting small parties on the right, noting that if they don't meet the electoral threshold, a right-wing government may not retain power. Ze'ev Elkin, the only Russian speaker on its list, was appointed the head of immigrant outreach on 25 August. Netanyahu announced in mid-October that the party plans to retain the Ministry of Defense and Ministry of National Security portfolios if it forms another government. Netanyahu's Likud has been endorsed by U.S. President Donald Trump ahead of the election.

=== New Economic Party–The Reservists ===
In July 2026, Yoaz Hendel of The Reservists and Hili Tropper announced they would run in an alliance named Foundations of Israel. Later in the month, it rebranded to Zionist Home – The Reservists. However, the alliance ended on 6 September after Tropper decided to leave the alliance and join Yashar. In response, Hendel joined forces with economist Yaron Zelekha to form a new alliance between the New Economic Party, which Zelekha heads, and The Reservists, with Einat Wilf joining the Reservists the day after. The party platform focuses on the need to "fight tycoons and the cost of living" and supports "full universal service" for all Israelis. Hendel reportedly wanted the party to sign a surplus-vote agreement with Amcha Yisrael, but its leader Ofer Winter rejected it.

=== Noam ===
Noam leader Avi Maoz announced in July 2026 that the party would rebrand itself as "Noam for Israel." The party's election campaign, launched on 29 July, also revealed the party’s initial list of Knesset candidates, former Kiryat Arba Council head Eliyahu Libman, and Beersheba Deputy Mayor Shimon Tubul. The party announced in mid-August that it had added Yisca Hayimov, the sister of Shin Bet chief David Zini, as well as Liora Alon, an immigrant from France and former advisor to the Mayor of Jerusalem.

=== Otzma Yehudit ===
Otzma Yehudit is expected to pursue voters from Likud and Shas who are dissatisfied with those parties.

=== Ra'am ===
Ra'am opened its electoral slate in January 2026 to Jewish candidates. Later that year, in August, party leader Mansour Abbas and former Yesh Atid MK Yoav Segalovitz confirmed that Segalovitz joined the party's electoral list, he is reportedly expecting to receive the party's second slot. Abbas finalized the party's formal separation from the southern branch of the Islamic Movement in July 2026, pivoting from Islamism towards an independent civic platform. Ra'am announced in July that it would run separately from the proposed Joint List. The following week, the party launched its campaign in Kafr Kanna, with Ra'am positioning itself as a pragmatic partner seeking to replace the Netanyahu government.

=== Religious Zionist Party ===
Religious Zionist Party head Bezalel Smotrich called for increasing Jewish immigration in Galilee and the Negev in a 27 August speech. The party began negotiations with Zehut head Moshe Feiglin over a joint run, as the emergence of Winter's party led to polling where the RZP was near or below the electoral threshold. The two parties reached an agreement on 1 September to run as a technical bloc and were open to an alliance with other right-wing parties, while Winter dismissed the idea. The RZP Central Committee approved the Zehut merger on 6 September. The party released a political platform in September calling for more extensive judicial reform, in addition to limiting the standing of who is allowed to approach the court, as well as allowing the Supreme Court president and vice president to be selected by sitting judges, rather than the Judicial Selection Committee.

=== Shas ===
Shas leader Aryeh Deri launched the party's election campaign on 20 August 2026 in Holon.

Two new members, Dror Amos and Yosef Alnathanov, were added to the party's slate. Deri reportedly tried to remove Yoav Ben-Tzur, but the party's Moetzet Chachmei HaTorah "overruled" him.

Deri, in mid-October, called for the passage of a draft law before the party would enter another government.

=== Together ===
Naftali Bennett registered a new party called Bennett 2026 in April 2025 and announced the following November that he would contest the 2026 election. Bennett announced a new initiative in April 2026 geared towards those with disabilities. Later that month, Bennett 2026 and Yesh Atid announced their intention to contest the election jointly in an alliance named Together. Bennett and Yair Lapid, who are the respective heads of their parties, had served as rotating prime ministers during the thirty-sixth government of Israel. The party launched their election campaign on 12 May with an event at Expo Tel Aviv. Lapid stated in a September interview with The Jerusalem Post that the party would support LGBT rights and civil marriage in the next government. Together initially targeted voters on the right, but the rise of Yashar has led to a shift, with Bennett seeking to draw Liberal Zionist voters.

=== United Torah Judaism ===
The party's list includes new members Moshe Rosenthal, Eliakim Stark, Yehuda Weisfish and Dudi Zeltz after the removal of long-time MKs Moshe Gafni and Uri Maklev.

United Torah Judaism announced in September 2026 that its three factions (Agudat Yisrael, Degel HaTorah and the newly formed Homat Torat Yisrael), would run their election campaign through one organization, unlike previous elections.

Party head Ya'akov Asher stated that it would not join a government unless a draft law was passed.

=== Yashar ===
Gadi Eisenkot announced on 30 June 2025 that he would leave Benny Gantz's National Unity, in part over disputes over a leadership primary. MK Matan Kahana announced the following day that he would also be leaving the party. The two were among the founders of a new political party, Yashar, which was formed on 16 September 2025. Ex-Shin Bet Director Yoram Cohen joined the party on 26 April 2026. After Eisenkot selected Cohen to be his number 2 listed individual, he stated that he would work with junior partners like Smotrich's Religious Zionism Party or the Likud if Netanyahu was no longer prime minister. Eisenkot officially launched the party's campaign on 30 June 2026, centering his platform on government reform and the establishment of an inquiry commission into the 7 October attacks. Yesh Atid MK Elazar Stern joined the party on 24 August. The party started a push in mid-October 2026, several weeks before the elections, to become the largest party, at the expense of other opposition parties, despite an agreement reached several weeks earlier which resulted in a "ceasefire" between themselves.

=== Yisrael Beiteinu ===
On 5 August, it was reported that after leaving Likud, MK Dan Illouz announced that he had joined Yisrael Beiteinu and would run with the party in the next election. He stated that he joined because, according to Illouz, it is "the party that today represents the national and liberal values in which I believe." On 23 August, the party reported the addition of Inbar Samovsky to its electoral list, a current Ra'anana City Council member. Party leader Avigdor Lieberman called for opposition parties to gain "seats from the coalition bloc", rather than taking votes from each other. Several days before the deadline for the submission of electoral lists, Lieberman emphasized that parties in the opposition should ally with each other to ensure that they pass the threshold. Lieberman, in September, ruled out forming a unity government with Likud or having Arab or Ultra-Orthodox parties in a government.

=== Party slogans ===
Party or alliance	Original slogan	English translation
Likud	"אין ישר. זה או ימין, או פלסטין."	"There is no middle ground [Yashar]. It's right or Palestine."
Together	"ביחד נתקן"	"Together we can fix it"
Together	"מתקנים את ישראל"	"Repairing Israel"
Joint List	" هنالك خيار آخر"	"There is another option"
Joint List	" יש אפשרות אחרת"	"There is another option"
Joint List	"Есть другая возможность"	"There is another option"
Otzma Yehudit	"מי שמאמין לא מפחד"	"The one who believes is not afraid."
Democrats	"בלי הדמוקרטים לא תהיה דמוקרטיה"	"Without the Democrats there would be no democracy"
Yashar	"ישראל צריכה דרך ישרה!"	"Israel needs a straight [Yashar] path!"
New Economic Party	"כי אפשר לחיות פה אחרת!"	"Because it's possible to live differently!"
Reservists	"מצילים את ישראל"	"Saving Israel"

== Campaign issues ==
=== Artificial intelligence and deepfakes ===
Artificial intelligence (AI) was heavily incorporated into both campaign strategy and voter behavior during the 2026 election cycle. The Central Elections Committee (CEC) implemented new transparency guidelines in July 2026 that mandate the explicit labeling of all political ads and campaign materials produced or substantially modified by AI. Despite these rules, a tracking study carried out in the run-up to the election by the Open University of Israel revealed that over one-eighth (roughly 13%) of all social media posts pertaining to the election were AI-generated or manipulated, with Benjamin Netanyahu's Likud party responsible for about one-third of the content that was flagged. Additionally, the electorate was directly impacted by the technology. According to an Israel Internet Association public opinion survey, 25% of Israeli voters, or one in four, intended to use large language model chatbots such as ChatGPT or Gemini to help them choose which party to vote for. While security experts cautioned that the consulted chatbots frequently relied on static data, suffered from hallucinations, or subtly reinforced the users' preexisting political biases, the same study highlighted systemic vulnerabilities, noting that 71% of respondents reported encountering election-related disinformation online.

Netanyahu posted an AI-generated ad to his social media that appeared to show Yashar head Gadi Eisenkot bypassing a person wearing a shirt that said "Israeli unity" to instead embrace Ra'am head Mansour Abbas; journalists Guy Peleg and Barak Seri maintained that the person with the shirt was meant to allude to Eisenkot's dead son, although Likud denied this. The chair of the CEC, Noam Sohlberg, ordered the Religious Zionist Party on 26 July 2026 to remove an AI-generated campaign video, which appeared to show someone resembling Eisenkot meeting with Mansour Abbas and Palestinian Authority president Mahmoud Abbas, on the grounds that it could be "misleading to voters". Later that month, Jonatan Urich, a campaign advisor for Netanyahu, removed an AI-generated video after Yashar threatened to file a lawsuit over it. Religious Zionist Party head Bezalel Smotrich shared an AI video in mid-September that showed Supreme Court President Yitzhak Amit, Justice Daphne Barak-Erez, and Attorney General Gali Baharav-Miara being "dragged at a protest". President Isaac Herzog and others, including Eisenkot, Together leader Naftali Bennett and The Democrats head Yair Golan, strongly condemned the video.

Netanyahu has focused his platform on the Iranian regime's threat, portraying it as Israel's top priority and an existential turning point. Artificial intelligence (AI) content was also used more widely during the campaign to influence voters. Netanyahu shared an AI-generated picture of a nuclear explosion over Tel Aviv on X on 25 October 2026. The post, which was accompanied by text warning of a "second Holocaust" from an unchecked Iranian regime, called domestic discussions such as military draft evasion a "smokescreen," saying that "nothing else will matter anymore." The image was strongly denounced by political rivals, including Yair Golan of The Democrats, who questioned Netanyahu's stability and accused him of using fear tactics.

=== Constitutionalism ===
According to a poll in December 2025, an estimated 71% of Israelis support establishing a constitution for the country instead of the existing Basic Laws of Israel. Bennett has campaigned on creating a constitution as part of its election platform. Bennett implied that his support for a constitution is a response to the government efforts at judicial reform in 2023 and later again in 2025. He believes that the existing Basic Laws are unclear in how to legislate or repeal and by what majority, and that by contrast a constitution provides a "clear foundation". The party platform of Yashar also supports enacting a constitution for the state. Yisrael Beitenu has also campaigned on the issue. Zionist Home – The Reservists, which was an alliance headed by Hili Tropper and Yoaz Hendel, was in favor of creating what it calls a "Zionist constitution", which would "strengthen checks and balances" in Israel.

=== Cost of living ===
Voters' primary concerns in the run-up to the election were the domestic economy and the growing cost of living, even though ongoing regional conflicts continued to dominate headlines. According to a survey conducted in October 2026 by the Israel Democracy Institute, the top two factors influencing voting intentions were the high cost of living and the overall state of the economy, with economic concerns cutting sharply across partisan lines, along with national security.

Voter anxiety was mainly caused by localized microeconomic pressure, such as an 8% increase in staple food prices, declining real wages, and rising housing expenses, even though Israel's macroeconomic indicators remained robust, with GDP growth predicted at 4.0% for 2026 and consumer inflation relatively low at 1.5%. According to opposition figures, Israel's baseline living expenses are 34% higher than the OECD average due to a 20% increase in consumer prices since the 2022 election.

Different political parties used the state of the economy to create different platform promises:

- The Democrats: The social-democratic merger of Labor and Meretz, led by Yair Golan, presented the high cost of living as a systemic result of structural disparities in wealth distribution and public disinvestment. The party platform promised to promote socioeconomic equality and increase funding for public infrastructure, particularly welfare, healthcare, and education programs, in order to combat localized inflation. In response to criticism from centrist opposition allies, Golan clarified his initial proposal to completely cut off state funding to all settlements in the West Bank in order to balance the national budget. The final platform changed this focus, pledging to completely eliminate state funding and subsidies for illegal outposts and unauthorized farm constructions rather than evacuating established settlement blocs. The platform called for moving coalition budget allocations away from sector-specific allocations and directly linking state financial benefits to a national military or civic service standard in order to further reduce the domestic deficit.
- Likud: Despite significant increases in defense spending, the ruling party defended its record by pointing to strong macroeconomic resilience, an 11% strengthening of the shekel, and record-high foreign investments. Benjamin Netanyahu, the prime minister, stressed sustained post-war recovery efforts and long-term stability.
- Religious Zionist Party: To meet its threshold requirements, the right-wing party, led by Finance Minister Bezalel Smotrich, formed a technical electoral alliance with the libertarian Zehut party. Following the Knesset's final legislative approval of the 2026 State Budget, Smotrich defended his fiscal record by rejecting calls for large-scale state-interventionist subsidies. Rather, the party's cost-of-living platform focused on aggressive free-market deregulation, contending that the only practical long-term ways to reduce domestic retail prices were to increase commercial competition, remove structural import barriers, and implement supply-side economic reforms.
- Reservists–Economic Party alliance: The joint list, which was founded by economist Yaron Zelekha and former communications minister Yoaz Hendel, specifically focused on "fighting tycoons and the cost of living" in addition to comprehensive enlistment reform. A three-month plan to remove all import tariffs, dismantle product quotas, and legally prohibit monopolistic domestic manufacturers from overseeing exclusive international import agreements was part of the alliance's economic platform, which promoted broad free-market structural changes. The platform unprecedentedly combined these deregulation policies with civic reforms to address structural deficits, calling for the immediate imposition of financial sanctions against draft evaders and the complete abolition of military exemptions in order to fairly distribute the country's economic and civic burdens.
- Together: The centrist coalition, led by Naftali Bennett in support of Yair Lapid, formalized a policy roadmap called "A New Agreement on the Cost of Living" and focused its economic platform on aggressive liberalization. Aiming to lower consumer food costs to the OECD average, the campaign specifically declared an "all-out war on monopolies" and supply-chain concentrations. The platform suggested broad structural changes to break up established corporate cartels, such as requiring dominant suppliers to divest their brands, prohibiting exclusive importers from distributing several major international brands, and deregulating the domestic kosher certification market to promote competition in international markets.
- Yashar! and Yisrael Beiteinu: Cutting fiscal waste was the main focus of the secular opposition blocs' economic platforms. In order to reduce the public budget deficit, Gadi Eisenkot's Yashar and Avigdor Lieberman's Yisrael Beiteinu promised to remove "superfluous ministries" (like the Ministries of Heritage and Settlement) and take away billions in contentious coalition funding allocations.

=== Crime ===
Crime rates have risen in recent years particularly in Arab neighborhoods, with Tel Aviv District police chief calling it a "national emergency", and that "if we don't work together, we won't be able to win". This issue has led to intense debates over potential causes and solutions. In July 2026, the government approved a plan for the Shin Bet to tackle organized violent crime. Arab-majority parties have also campaigned on crime reduction, including from the Joint List made up of Hadash–Ta'al and Balad.

=== Disqualifications of individuals and parties ===
The Democrats filed a petition on 14 September before the CEC to bar Otzma Yehudit. Otzma Yehudit filed a petition against the Democrats that same day. The panel voted on 24 September against disqualifying the Democrats by a vote of 14-2 and voted 19-10 against a petition to disqualify Otzma Yehudit. It also dismissed the disqualification of the Religious Zionist Party by a vote of 21-3. The decision to allow Otzma Yehudit to run, as well as petitions against Itamar Ben-Gvir and Tally Gotliv, was appealed to the Supreme Court of Israel on 29 September. The disqualification petitions against Otzma Yehudit, as well as Ben-Gvir and Gotliv, were rejected by the court on 4 October.

On 23 September, the CEC barred Ra'am and the Joint List, alongside its candidates Ofer Cassif and Sami Abu Shehadeh, from contesting the election. Adalah announced its intention to challenge this decision to the Supreme Court, with Joint List head Yousef Jabareen criticising the decision as discouraging Arab citizens "representing more than 1.25 million voters" from voting. Ra'am and the Joint List appealed their disqualifications to the Supreme Court on 29 September. The Supreme Court would have voted in favor of disqualifying Abu Shehadeh, but recommended that he submit his resignation to the CEC, which he did on 2 October. The Supreme Court overturned the disqualifications of Ra'am, the Joint List and Cassif the same day.

=== Election integrity ===
A number of political parties filed official complaints with the CEC on election day, claiming that there had been systematic tampering with actual ballots. The Amcha Israel party reported that its ballot slips, which were marked with the Hebrew letter Chaf (ך), had either been purposefully turned face-down to resemble blank voting slips or were entirely absent from several polling places. Similar to this, Yisrael Beiteinu filed an urgent complaint after its slips were discovered missing at a Kiryat Ono polling place; however, the CEC later stated that the station had enough supplies. Additionally, Yisrael Beiteinu reported a "serious irregularity" in Beersheba, where a voter was purportedly given a pre-sealed envelope containing a ballot from a rival Likud party.

The Reservists party, led by Yoaz Hendel, joined the list of factions that filed complaints with the CEC, citing multiple reports that its ballot slips, which had the letters "Dalet-Yud" (די) on them, had been vandalized or removed entirely. Hendel attributed the disruptions to a "fake news campaign" by Likud, calling the incidents a coordinated effort to suppress the faction. The Yashar party led by Gadi Eisenkot filed its own urgent petition in response to widespread reports of its ballot slips being flipped over, removed, or vandalized across the country. The extent of the incidents was described by the party leadership as a "systematic and deliberate attempt to sabotage the democratic process" as opposed to isolated mistakes.

There have been reports of irregularities in ultra-Orthodox communities. Voting slips for the Charedi Public party were completely missing from polling places in Bnei Brak, according to several voters, who had to specifically ask election supervisors for them. Public broadcaster Kan reported accounts from voters who alleged that supervisors only produced the missing slips upon direct demand, raising concerns over voter intimidation due to the uniform Haredi composition of the local polling staff.

The CEC released an official statement refuting claims of widespread fraud in response to the growing accusations from the various factions, including Yashar, Together, Amcha Yisrael, Yisrael Beiteinu, and the Reservists party. According to the CEC, "contrary to claims circulating online, there are currently no indications of systematic tampering with ballot slips." The committee urged voters to rely solely on official CEC communications channels for election updates and clarified that isolated, local reports were being looked into and handled individually on the ground.

==== Pre-election security briefing dispute ====
Two days prior to the legislative election, on 25 October 2026, Prime Minister Benjamin Netanyahu and National Security Minister Itamar Ben-Gvir convened an urgent meeting with Israel Police Commissioner Daniel Levi to discuss election security, sparking a significant controversy. Attorney General Gali Baharav-Miara heavily opposed the meeting, arguing that election candidates are prohibited from interfering with police operations or election management. She also stated that she was unaware of any prior precedent for a meeting of this nature immediately prior to a vote.

Gadi Eisenkot, the leader of the Yashar party, petitioned the CEC to prevent the meeting, accusing Netanyahu of attempting to "sabotage the election" by creating a false public perception of election integrity flaws and trying to put political pressure on public employees. CEC Chairman Justice Noam Sohlberg ultimately allowed the conversation to continue under the stringent legal requirement that the political leadership refrain from discussing the election procedure or any other topics falling under the CEC's exclusive purview. Netanyahu's legal team justified the meeting by claiming defense entities had provided serious security warnings about militant groups attempting to sabotage the election.

According to a report published the next day in Haaretz, Netanyahu had specifically disregarded Sohlberg's directive during the meeting by warning the Police Commissioner to the possibility of "left-wing anarchists" rioting and tainting the election process. Senior law enforcement officials subsequently accused Netanyahu of deceiving the CEC chairman, stating that Sohlberg "needs to be more alert" to political manipulations regarding the legitimacy of the ballot.

==== Voter tracking and privacy enforcement ====
Due to legal disputes surrounding unlawful voter tracking on election day, CEC Chairman Justice Noam Sohlberg issued an urgent interim order prohibiting United Torah Judaism (UTJ) from recording voters. This came after the Movement for Quality Government in Israel filed a petition after Channel 13 disclosed UTJ directives to circumvent prohibition by using handwritten logs. A September 2026 High Court ruling prohibiting voter arrival tracking under the Protection of Privacy Law was violated by these tracking initiatives. Naftali Bennett's Together party filed additional complaints alleging that Likud was monitoring voter turnout in the Southern Sharon region using a mobile app.

=== Ethnic discourse and controversies ===
Media personality and Likud supporter Yinon Magal sparked widespread controversy in the last weeks of the campaign after making comments that were widely denounced as anti-Mizrahi slurs. The remarks were compared to historical electoral flashpoints involving ethnic denigration, like Dudu Topaz's "Chakhchakhim Speech" during the 1981 election campaign, and Yair Garbuz's "Amulet Kissers' Speech" in 2015.

The dynamic, according to observers, was different from previous elections in that disgruntled Mizrahi voters were thought to be more likely to switch to explicitly Mizrahi or right-wing religious parties within the pro-Netanyahu bloc, like Shas or Otzma Yehudit, rather than defecting to centrist opposition slates led by individuals like Gadi Eisenkot. In the previous controversies the anti-Mizrahi slurs were from the left, and the backlash was more damaging to the left. The unusual feature of the 2026 controversy was the anti-Mizrahi comments coming from the centre-right.

=== Investigation into the 7 October attacks ===
A major campaign issue in the election is an investigation into the 7 October attacks. On 6 February 2026, sitting prime minister Netanyahu released a document of his answers during an investigation by the State Comptroller of Israel, which pinned the failures on Netanyahu's political rivals while presenting himself in a positive image. This led to criticism from opposition lawmakers, including from Gadi Eisenkot, who founded Yashar to contest in the elections. Eisenkot accused Netanyahu of creating a "fabricated defense" and that the document was published "out of a desire to improve his image, distance himself from blame and harm the other candidates facing him". Gadi Eisenkot, Yair Golan (The Democrats), Avigdor Lieberman (Yisrael Beiteinu), and Naftali Bennett (Together) have all pledged to establish a state commission of inquiry into 7 October as part of their campaign platform.

On 8 September 2026, a report by Haaretz claimed that Netanyahu had received advanced warning by UAE President Mohamed bin Zayed of the 7 October attacks days prior, but did not warn Israeli security chiefs. Netanyahu denied it as an "absolute lie", while Gadi Eisenkot, Naftali Bennett, Avigdor Lieberman, and Yair Golan issued a joint statement calling for "an immediate and thorough investigation" into Netanyahu.

On 24 October 2026, just three days before the general election, thousands of people demonstrated in Tel Aviv against the government of Benjamin Netanyahu; the leaders of four major opposition parties, including Gadi Eisenkot, attended the protest. The demonstration came after years of efforts to establish an independent commission of inquiry into Israel’s security failures during the 7 October 2023, attack.

Since the start of the Gaza war, the issues of Haredi conscription in Israel and exemptions from military service have been heavily debated. During the war, support for Haredi conscription rose significantly, from 67% in January 2024 to 84.5% by January 2025. In June 2024, the Supreme Court of Israel declared any continued exemption of IDF conscription unlawful. In response, officials in the ultra-Orthodox Shas party urged potential conscripts to ignore any call-ups from the IDF and to protest. By the next month, the army began drafting 3,000 Haredi men.

In 2025, Foreign Affairs and Defense Committee chairman Yuli Edelstein had been drafting a Haredi conscription bill, leading to internal division within the governing coalition as Haredi parties demanded continued military exemption. On 23 July, Likud members voted to remove Edelstein and replace him with Boaz Bismuth by a vote of 29 in favor, with four opposed. A poll published by Ma'ariv reported that 52% of respondents found the move to be inappropriate, while 24% found it appropriate, and 24% were unsure.

Opposition leaders have criticized the coalition's unwillingness to enforce a full conscription on eligible Haredi citizens, and have called for an end to Haredi exemptions from military service. Inbar Harush Gity of Yashar has named Haredi conscription "a top priority." Similarly, the issue of Haredi conscription is considered a "central question" in the campaign of Yesh Atid and its leader Yair Lapid. Eisenkot indicated that he supports military service exemptions for up to three percent of Haredim enrolled in their yeshiva for religious study, but opposes the decades-old system that allowed significant exemptions to ultra-Orthodox men following the 7 October attacks.

=== Polling station voter tracking ===
On 17 September 2026, the High Court of Justice issued a ruling in the run-up to the elections, prohibiting political parties from gathering or sending real-time voter turnout and identity data from polling places on the grounds of privacy violations. On 18 October 2026, a former Likud campaign technology official filed a sworn affidavit with the High Court, reigniting the controversy despite the judicial ban. The party's recently released campaign app, according to the whistleblower, had settings that could use a smartphone's microphone to passively stream audio from polling places, getting around the law by tracking voters' identities as election workers read their names aloud.

The High Court of Justice ruled 2–1 on 22 October to forbid observers and representatives of political parties from digitally counting voters and sending real-time numerical totals from polling places to party operations. The ruling reversed a previous order from the CEC's acting director-general that permitted numerical tracking as long as individual identities remained anonymous. The majority was composed of Justices Ruth Ronnen and Khaled Kabub, "with Justice David Mintz dissenting".

=== Security concerns ===
Increased worries about political violence and intimidation surfaced during the election cycle. Yair Golan, the chairman of The Democrats, received numerous severe death threats in August and September 2026 on social media and in public places. Some of the calls encouraged physical violence, such as saying he should be shot or hanged. The Democrats formally petitioned the High Court of Justice on 29 September 2026, requesting an order requiring Shin Bet security protection for Golan. The party argued that denying him a security detail led to an unfair and hazardous campaigning environment, particularly after threat protection was authorized for Yashar party leader Gadi Eisenkot. After reviewing the state's updated, non-Shin Bet security measures for opposition leaders during a closed-door hearing, Supreme Court President Yitzhak Amit suggested that the party withdraw the petition.

On 19 October 2026, eight days before the election, a campaign billboard belonging to The Democrats was severely vandalized, raising additional concerns about incitement. The words "wanted dead or alive," along with accusations that Golan was "a vile murderer of Jews" and references to the Ku Klux Klan, were scrawled across his face. The Democrats' stance on diplomatic engagement with the Palestinians and their willingness to form a government coalition with Arab parties appeared to be targeted in the graffiti. Golan posted pictures of the vandalized sign and said that while the billboard could be targeted, "hope will defeat hatred" at the poll.

The same day, a car carrying Fleur Hassan-Nahoum, the fifth candidate on the right-wing Amcha Yisrael election list, was attacked in the town of Turmus Ayya, turning security threats into physical assaults in the West Bank. The car was targeted while Hassan-Nahoum was on a public diplomacy tour with the pro-settlement Regavim movement. While participants were told to duck, video footage from the scene showed a Palestinian tossing a rock that smashed right through the car's window, causing minor injuries to tour members. Ofer Winter, the leader of the party, heavily criticized the government after the attack, accusing it of concentrating on political targets while neglecting to combat terrorism or offer sufficient protection for election candidates.

In addition to threats directed at The Democrats leader Yair Golan, other well-known opposition figures were subjected to severe hostile rhetoric. As the election drew closer, Gadi Eisenkot, the leader of the Yashar party and former chief of staff of the IDF, received multiple death threats in public and online. On 29 September 2026, the Shin Bet formally decided not to give Eisenkot an official state security detail, citing a lack of specific concrete intelligence to support it. Instead, the agency authorized his private guards to carry weapons and provided intelligence monitoring, despite a professional advisory committee's recommendation for state protection.

Yisrael Beitenu filed an official complaint with the Knesset sergeant-at-arms on 21 October 2026, six days prior to the election, after announcing that chairman Avigdor Liberman had received several explicit death threats. Among the threats were texts that called him a "Nazi bastard who hates Judaism" and said, "Only when you get a bullet in your head will you shut your mouth." The incident came after Liberman received a message threatening his execution in September 2026, which prompted Yisrael Beitenu to file a police complaint.

Following threats and an attack on the campaign trail, security for former prime minister and Together party chairman Naftali Bennett was doubled on the same day. As he visited Likud strongholds to win over undecided voters, the Shin Bet increased his level of protection to that of a defense minister. A local resident was charged with assault after two glass salt shakers were thrown at Bennett during a campaign stop in the ultra-Orthodox city of Bnei Brak, injuring two members of Bennett's staff. The increased threat environment was also attributed by security agencies to foiled plots by foreign agents connected to his previous actions against the Iranian regime.

Five days prior to the election, on 22 October 2026, President Isaac Herzog used his official speech at the state memorial service commemorating 31 years since the assassination of former Prime Minister Yitzhak Rabin to denounce severe rhetorical hostility in the campaign environment. Herzog explicitly denounced persistent threats of death made online against political party leaders, Knesset members, and elected officials. He also cautioned against the escalation of political violence, citing public roadside signs demanding the release of Yigal Amir, Rabin's killer, as a danger to democratic stability.

During a late-night campaign stop in Jerusalem on 22 October 2026, a glass bottle was hurled at Prime Minister Benjamin Netanyahu's motorcade close to the Mahane Yehuda Market. The incident happened in the midst of heightened tensions at the market, where the premier was confronted about domestic policies and security lapses by anti-government protestors and relatives of hostages held in Gaza. While the convoy proceeded unharmed, Israel Police and security personnel swiftly broke through the crowd barricades to look for the offender.

Itamar Ben-Gvir, the National Security Minister, strongly condemned the attack and placed it in the context of the larger 2026 election climate. He called it a direct result of political "incitement against the Prime Minister" and warned that political rhetoric from the opposition could turn into deadly physical violence. The political opposition, on the other hand, concentrated their criticism on the unstable atmosphere that followed. MK Gilad Kariv of the Democrats vehemently denounced the retaliatory physical attacks that Likud loyalists committed against protesting hostage families at the scene, accusing the government of deserting its people while inciting a violent campaign environment.

==== Turnout appeals from right-wing leaders ====
Right-wing leaders in Prime Minister Benjamin Netanyahu's political bloc started focused consolidation campaigns to mobilize their supporters in response to the CEC's high early voter turnout reports. Bezalel Smotrich, the minister of finance, claimed that Arab and left-wing groups were disproportionately responsible for the high initial participation rates. However, an independent fact-checker countered that there were no demographic or regional breakdowns in the early official statistics. Smotrich publicly urged right-wing voters to abandon smaller ideologically aligned parties near the 3.25% electoral threshold to avoid wasting votes. Political analysts pointed out that this tactic specifically targeted Ofer Winter's Amcha Israel party. Likud's rhetoric from earlier election cycles was frequently compared to the messaging in the media.

Netanyahu warned his supporters in a video speech later on election day that many Arabs in the southern region were "racing to the ballots". He specifically charged political rivals with "trying to steal the election from us," citing an overnight police investigation that resulted in the detention of three Ra'am operatives in Bedouin communities on suspicion of bribing voters. A media outlet pointed out that the Prime Minister's specific demographic claims were not supported by current official data, despite his assertion that Arab voter turnout in the Negev greatly exceeded Jewish turnout. Senior Likud minister Miri Regev later repeated Netanyahu's remarks, weaponizing the high overall turnout metrics as leverage to claim that coordinated opposition mobilization was actively undermining a right-wing victory.

Itamar Ben-Gvir, the minister of national security, went to the entrance of the Arab city of Kafr Qasim and posted a video appeal on social media. Ben-Gvir pointed to the town and called the Arab sector's participation metrics "crazy" and "unprecedented", warning his supporters that winning required matching this momentum to keep the nation "Jewish and Zionist". He clearly presented the contest as a direct contest for political representation against Ahmad Tibi of Hadash-Ta'al and Mansour Abbas of Ra'am, two well-known Arab lawmakers.

==== Vandalism and violence ====
On election day, there were multiple serious instances of vandalism, voter intimidation, and physical violence directed at political leaders and campaign staff. Israel Police detained an unidentified suspect in Tel Aviv following what appeared to be an attempt to stab Yair Golan, the leader of the Democratic Party, outside a polling station. Golan was unharmed in the attack, which the party denounced as a direct result of systemic political incitement. According to party officials, the attacker approached Golan with a sharp object before being stopped by security guards and onlookers. Outside a polling place in Netanya, Ruby Chen, the father of deceased dual U.S.-Israeli soldier Staff Sgt. Itay Chen, whose body was held captive in Gaza, was verbally abused and called a "traitor" by a local. At the time of the altercation, Chen was standing outside the site with a picture of his slain son.

While trying to stop a person from destroying campaign materials in Tiberias, an activist for Naftali Bennett's Together party was physically attacked. Together, Yisrael Beiteinu, and Yashar banners were being torn down by a man, who then shoved and pushed the female activist, according to video footage of the incident. The party later filed a formal complaint with the police. Separately, the Charedi Public party reported that its field workers in Bnei Brak, Beit Shemesh, and Betar Illit were violently attacked at information booths close to polling stations. According to reports, a protester in Beit Shemesh destroyed campaign materials and upended an entire information table, which led to additional police intervention regarding voter intimidation.

An attacker from the far-right Otzma Yehudit party, led by National Security Minister Itamar Ben-Gvir, struck two Democrats campaign activists in the face at a polling station booth in Holon. After the group tried to obstruct the attacker's path to the booth, video footage from the scene showed the attacker knocking one of the activists unconscious. Yair Golan, the chairman of the Democrats, postponed his scheduled election-day tour in order to visit Holon and assist the injured victims after the attack. In a statement denouncing the violence, the Democrats claimed that Prime Minister Benjamin Netanyahu's political incitement had "fully trickled down to the grassroots."

Yisrael Beiteinu, the secular nationalist party, reported that people wearing Otzma Yehudit-related shirts attacked its campaign activists in Netanya. Before leaving the area, the attackers destroyed the party's local campaign stand, scattered its promotional materials, and replaced them with Otzma Yehudit fliers, according to a statement released by Yisrael Beiteinu. The party declared that its activists planned to file a formal police complaint, strongly denounced the violence, and demanded prompt police action to identify the attackers.

=== Shas campaign video ===
Shas released a campaign video in August, portraying a religious family on Shabbat, waiting for their son, who serves in the IDF, to arrive home for dinner. Notably, the party has supported legislation that would allow draft exemptions for ultra-Orthodox men. Yashar issued a formal complaint over the video, criticising the use of IDF imagery in the video. CEC head Solhberg called for the removal of the video. Shas did not remove the video at first, though it later removed the video the same day and criticised Sohlberg.

=== Term limits ===
In September 2025, Bennett announced that he would work towards implementing term limits for the prime minister if he was elected to lead a government. After forming the Together joint list with Lapid in April 2026, Bennett reiterated his platform of establishing term limits for the post of prime minister.

=== Transparency concerns ===
==== Disinformation and spoofing incidents ====
Following a coordinated spoofing campaign, the centrist Yashar party declared on 26 October 2026, the eve of the election, that it had petitioned the CEC and filed a formal police complaint. Fraudulent SMS texts and voice recordings that mimicked official party communications were disseminated by unidentified actors. In order to spread false information, the phony messages used Yashar's name and its official mailing list unsubscribe number. They also sent texts to people in the Galilee region, falsely urging them not to vote for opposition ally Naftali Bennett. Yashar leadership responded by alerting the public to an increase in "fake news" meant to sway voters and asking the CEC's cyber department to begin an immediate investigation.

The CEC received an urgent appeal from Avigdor Liberman's Yisrael Beiteinu party on 26 October 2026, the eve of the election, alleging a coordinated foreign election interference operation via WhatsApp. Thousands of Russian-language text messages that originated from phone numbers with Swedish and Indian country codes were widely distributed, according to the party. The messages urged recipients to reroute their support, falsely claiming that Yisrael Beiteinu would fall short of the 3.25% electoral threshold. Former Prime Minister Naftali Bennett's Together joined Yisrael Beiteinu's petition to CEC Chairman Justice Noam Sohlberg after some of the automated messages pretended to be from the party. In addition to requesting that the Shin Bet and domestic law enforcement launch an investigation into possible state-sponsored foreign actors, the joint appeal sought an immediate injunction to stop the distribution vector. The incident took place amid broader cybersecurity alerts; earlier that day, Ofer Winter's Amcha Israel party revealed that senior campaign officials had also been locked out of WhatsApp due to targeted cyberattacks from foreign numbers.

According to a November 6, 2026, report by Haaretz, a network of 1,653 accounts on X posing as Iranian users posted coordinated messages in Hebrew ahead of the Israeli elections, urging Israelis to vote for Benjamin Netanyahu "on behalf of the Iranian people." Expose also found that about 1,600 accounts in this network had been identified the last year as part of an influence operation aimed at promoting Reza Pahlavi, the son of Iran's last shah, as a replacement for the Iranian government. According to Haaretz, after the elections, the network resumed its usual activity of promoting Pahlavi.

==== Restrictions on foreign press ====
Five foreign journalists trying to cover the election had their entry and travel permits revoked by Israeli authorities in the two weeks leading up to the election, sparking accusations of pre-election censorship. Hours before her flight on 23 October, Francesca Cicardi, a Middle East correspondent for the Spanish newspaper elDiario.es had her travel permit revoked by the Israel Population and Immigration Authority. Cicardi received no formal explanation for the ban, even though she had legitimate credentials from the Government Press Office.

Reporters Without Borders (RSF), which stated that Netanyahu's government was actively trying to eradicate outside scrutiny of the democratic process based on media editorial stances, strongly condemned the exclusion of foreign reporters. A formal defense of international press freedom and the rights of Spanish journalists working overseas was issued by Spain's Ministry of Foreign Affairs as a result of the incident.

=== Voter suppression concerns ===
When Likud and Religious Zionism jointly announced plans to send about 2,000 political activists to polling stations in Arab communities for the election in October 2026, a significant controversy erupted. The parties used a "special mapping" of unsubstantiated fraud risks as justification for the operation, which sparked rumors that Likud was setting up unofficial monitoring teams to provide real-time reports from outside Arab precincts. According to media reports, Likud was preparing a significant number of pre-planned complaints in anticipation of losing the election, thereby setting the stage for a public "stolen election" accusation. The premise of these campaigns was rejected by Dean Livne, Director-General of the CEC, who stated that "there is no widespread fraud in Israel" and that the safeguards in place were adequate.

Arab political figures and civil rights groups sharply denounced the announcement, calling it a voter suppression campaign meant to scare Arab citizens. Critics argued that the activists' presence decreased voter turnout because they lacked official regulatory authority within the stations. Regulations permitting licensed gun owners to bring firearms into polling places raised concerns, so the Joint List and Adalah petitioned the Israeli Supreme Court for a weapons ban. The Supreme Court dismissed the petition on 25 October, accepting the state's argument that professional police security assessments could not be overturned on an operational basis. Adalah criticized the decision, saying that it permitted right-wing activists to operate as "armed militias" in minority communities. Additionally, local concerns about voter intimidation were made worse by the presence of Israel Police officers inside polling places in a number of Negev Bedouin towns.

Officials and volunteer groups worked to keep voting safe from interference amid worries about political manipulation and misinformation. Volunteers monitored polling sites, while the CEC used body cameras and online monitoring. Experts believed widespread fraud is unlikely but expressed concerns about trust in the results, especially if officials challenge unfavorable outcomes. Members of Likud questioned the election's fairness early on.

==== Delays in Arab neighborhoods ====
Numerous Arab and Bedouin communities in the Galilee and southern regions reported widespread systemic delays, lengthy lines, and abnormally slow identification procedures on election day. Arab legal aid organization Adalah suggested that the practices were a planned effort to reduce Arab voter turnout. The CEC Chairman, Supreme Court Justice Noam Sohlberg, received an urgent appeal from the Association for Civil Rights in Israel (ACRI) asking for prompt action and the sending of inspectors to towns like Rahat, Tel Sheva, Laqiya, Segev Shalom, and Kafr Qara.

=== Yashar campaign in Cyprus ===
Yashar launched a billboard campaign in Cyprus, targeting Israelis who were vacationing abroad. Fidias Panayiotou, a Cypriot Member of the European Parliament, was highly critical of the campaign. Several days later, an image showing one of the billboards being vandalised circulated, though it was later reported to be an AI-generated image.
