= Thau =

Thau may refer to:

== People ==
- Thau (surname), a surname (including a list of people with the surname)
- Tạ Thu Thâu (1906–1945), Vietnamese Trotskyist
- Martin Thau (1887–1979), Danish gymnast
- Benny Thau (1898–1983). American film industry businessman.
- Charles Thau (1921–1995), Polish-born Jewish Holocaust survivor, resistance fighter, WW2 iconic photo (Russ-Yank 1945 linkup) and American immigrant.
- Leon Thau (1926–2010), British actor
- Eveline Goodman-Thau (born 1934), first female rabbi in Austria
- Marty Thau (1938–2014), American music producer
- Zvi Thau (born 1939), Israeli rabbi
- Lea Thau (born 1971), American film director
- Harald Thau (born 1985), Austrian politician

== Places ==
- Étang de Thau, a lagoon in southern France

== Other ==
- Thau, a letter of the Tocharian alphabet

== See also ==
- Thaumaturgy
- Thaw (disambiguation)
- Thou (disambiguation)
