= Naveh, Israel =

Moshav in southern Israel

Naveh: נווה (Hebrew)
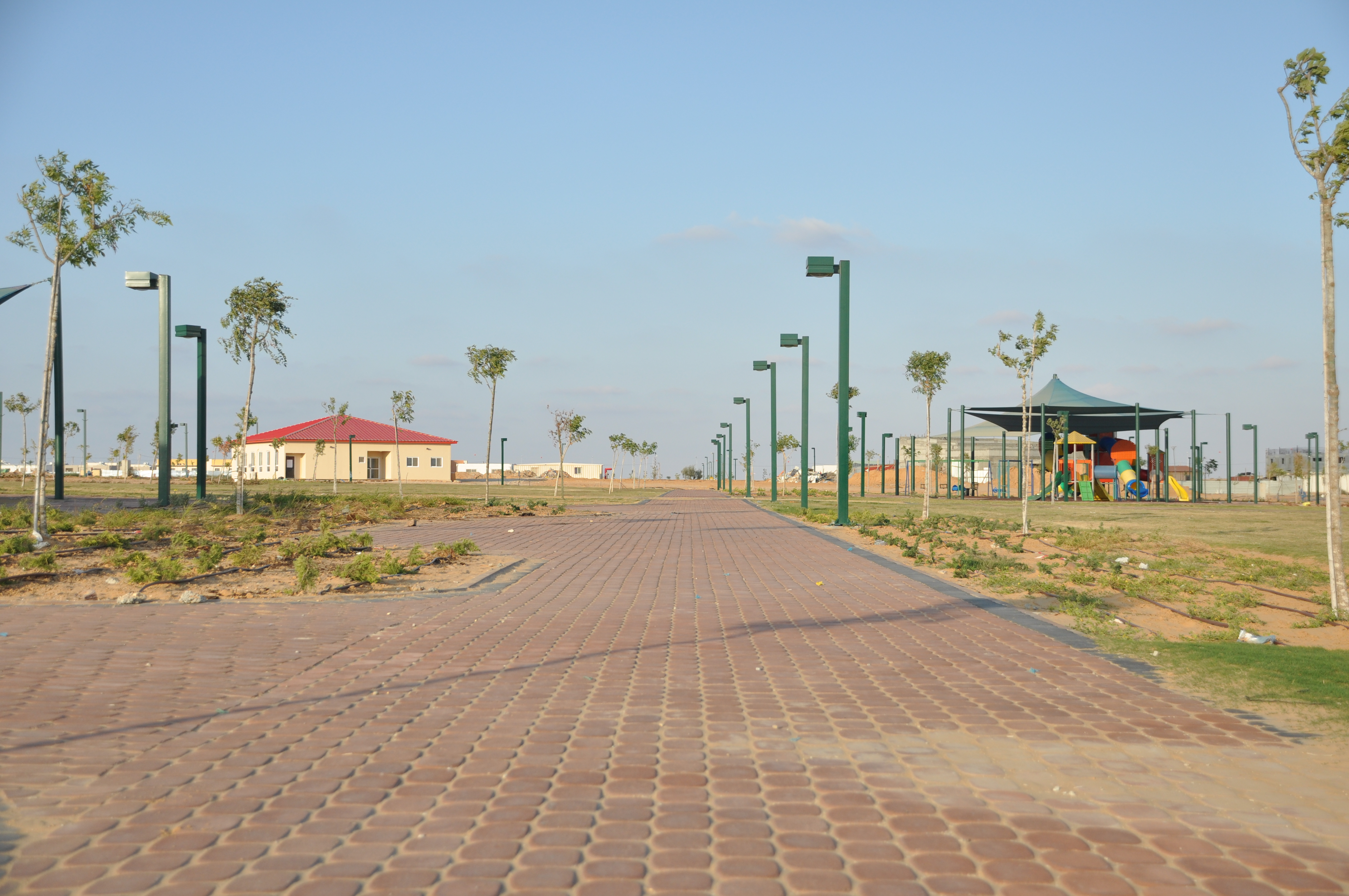

- Location within Northern Negev region of Israel Location within Israel
- Coordinates: 31°09′45″N 34°20′02″E
- Country: Israel
- District: Southern
- Subdistrict: Beersheba
- Council: Eshkol
- Affiliation: Amana
- Founded: 2008
- Founder: Former Bnei Atzmon residents
- Population (2024): 1,450

Naveh (Hebrew: נָוֶה) is a religious moshav in south-central Israel. Located near the Egyptian border, it falls under the jurisdiction of Eshkol Regional Council. In 2024 it had a population of 1,450.

== History ==
The village was established in 2008 by former residents of Bnei Atzmon, an Israeli settlement in the Gaza Strip that was evacuated as part of the Israeli disengagement from Gaza. Many of the residents are followers of Rabbi Zvi Thau of Har Hamor yeshiva.

== Notable people ==
- Rafi Peretz
