= Thau (surname) =

Thau is a surname.

== People ==
- Martin Thau (1887–1979), Danish gymnast
- Benny Thau (1898–1983). American film industry businessman.
- Charles Thau (1921–1995), Polish-born Jewish Holocaust survivor, resistance fighter, WW2 iconic photo (Russ-Yank 1945 linkup) and American immigrant.
- Leon Thau (1926–2010), British actor
- Eveline Goodman-Thau (born 1934), first female rabbi in Austria
- Marty Thau (1938–2014), American music producer
- Zvi Thau (born 1939), Israeli rabbi
- Lea Thau (born 1971), American film director
- Harald Thau (born 1985), Austrian politician

== Origins ==
As an Ashkenazi Jewish surname, Thau originated either from the German word Tau meaning "dew", from the name of the letter tav in the Hebrew script, or from some personal name which started with that letter.

Tháu is also a Gan romanization of two Chinese surnames: Cao and Tao.

== Statistics ==
As of 2019, there were 71 people in Denmark with the surname Thau. Most of them are not Jews. The first recordings of the surname in Danish parish registers date back to the 16th-17th centuries.

In the Netherlands, there were zero people with the surname Thau as of 2007, down from four in 1947.

The 2010 United States census found 457 people with the surname Thau, making it the 46,568th-most-common name in the country. This represented a decrease from 466 (43,629th-most-common) in the 2000 Census. In the 2010 census, about eight-tenths of the bearers of the surname identified as White, and 13 percent as Asian.
