= Haim Yosef Abergel =

Rabbi from Israel

Rabbi Haim Yosef Abergel
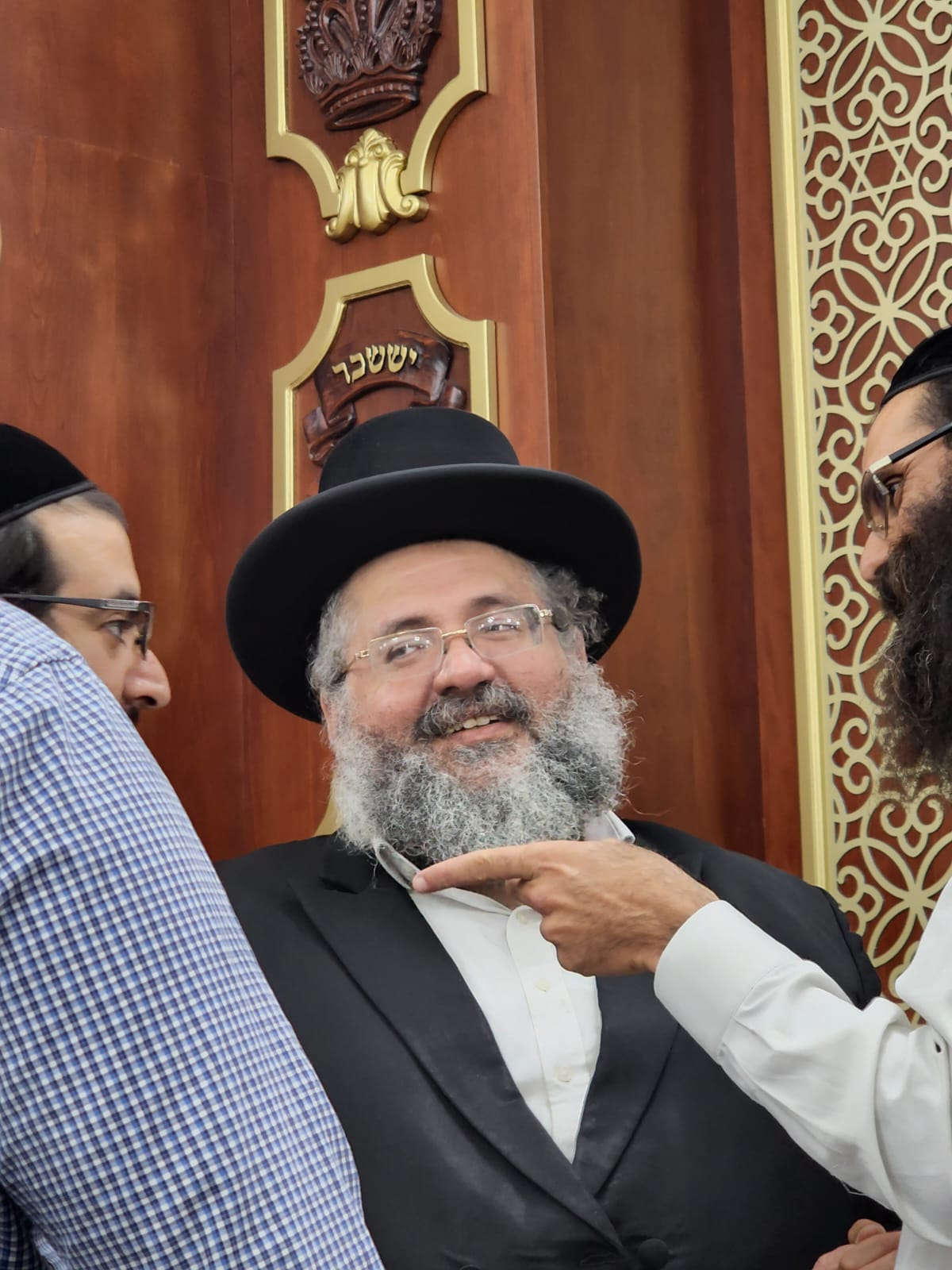

Personal life
- Born: חיים יוסף דוד אברג'ל; 10 January 1979 (age 47) Netivot
- Parents: Rabbi Yorem Abergel (father); Geula Abergel (mother)
- Occupation: Rabbi

Religious life
- Religion: Judaism
- Denomination: Sephardic Haredim

Jewish leader
- Residence: Netivot

Haim Yosef Abergel (Hebrew: חיים יוסף דוד אברג'ל) is the son of Rabbi Yoram Abergel, and is the head of the Bnei Yosef school network. He split his school network from the Shas-aligned Ma'ayan HaChinuch HaTorani school network, and transferred it to the state-run Haredi curriculum. Abergel formed a new party, called Ahi, which supported Haredi conscription. The party withdrew in early October, ahead of the 2026 Israeli legislative election.

== Legal issues ==
In August 2025, he has been accused of sexually assaulting young women and girls, and was later arrested by the Israel Police's Southern District on suspicion of sexual offences.

== Political career ==
Channel 13 reported in May 2025 that he planned to formed a new party, under the name Mayim Chaim.

Abergel formed a party in June 2026 called Ahi and planned to run in the 2026 Israeli legislative election, with policies focused on Haredim conscription. The party submitted its list for the election on 9 September. The party withdrew from the race on 23 October, with Likud promising to appoint a party member to the prime minister's office.
