= 2026 Israeli legislative election =

- 27 October 2026
- All 120 seats in the Knesset; 61 seats needed for a majority
- Opinion polls
- Turnout: 77.98% (▲7.35pp)
| Party | Leader | Vote % | Seats | +/– |
|---|---|---|---|---|
| Likud (Note: Likud signed a merger deal with New Hope, which brought four additional seats (from the previous Knesset composition).) | Benjamin Netanyahu | 20.51 | 27 | −9 |
| Yashar | Gadi Eisenkot | 16.05 | 21 | New |
| Together | Naftali Bennett | 9.35 | 12 | −12 |
| Joint List | Yousef Jabareen | 8.80 | 11 | +6 |
| Democrats | Yair Golan | 6.44 | 8 | +4 |
| Ra'am | Mansour Abbas | 5.93 | 8 | +3 |
| Yisrael Beiteinu | Avigdor Lieberman | 5.93 | 7 | +1 |
| Otzma Yehudit | Itamar Ben-Gvir | 5.74 | 7 | +1 |
| UTJ | Ya'akov Asher | 5.49 | 7 | 0 |
| Shas | Aryeh Deri | 5.26 | 6 | −5 |
| RZP–Zehut | Bezalel Smotrich | 5.11 | 6 | −1 |
This lists parties that won seats. See the complete results below.

| Prime Minister before | Prime Minister after |
|---|---|
| Benjamin Netanyahu; Likud (37th) | TBD |

Legislative elections were held in Israel on 27 October 2026 to elect the 120 members of the 26th Knesset and determine the governing coalition that succeeds the 37th government led by Prime Minister Benjamin Netanyahu.

The outgoing 25th Knesset became the first Israeli legislature to complete its full four-year term without early dissolution since 1988, ending the prolonged political crisis of 2018–2022 that saw five consecutive snap elections. However, the government's tenure was marked by political turmoil, including mass protests over judicial reform, the 7 October attacks and the subsequent Gaza war, and recurring coalition crises over Haredi military conscription. Key issues in the election campaign were national security, rising cost of living, military conscription, and crime. The election saw several new parties compete, most notably Yashar and Together, led by Gadi Eisenkot and Naftali Bennett, respectively.

The day of the election saw an exceptionally high voter turnout especially among Arab communities, along with allegations regarding election integrity and controversies regarding threats to physical security. No party or bloc won a clear majority in the Knesset following the election, with parties in the previous government losing 11 seats, Jewish opposition parties gaining two seats and Arab parties gaining nine seats. Since the end of the election, the process of government formation among the different parties remains ongoing.

== Background ==
A voting booth containing official paper ballot slips of the 2026 Israeli elections

After the 36th government lost its majority, snap elections were called in 2022. They resulted in Benjamin Netanyahu's bloc gaining a majority, and a government was successfully negotiated between Likud, Otzma Yehudit, Noam, Religious Zionist Party, United Torah Judaism, and Shas. The coalition was sworn in on 29 December 2022.

In January 2023, the 37th government announced a package of proposed judicial reforms that would have significantly changed the balance of power between the judiciary and the executive and legislative branches. The proposals triggered one of the largest protest movements in Israeli history, with weekly demonstrations taking place across the country for several months. Following mass protests, a nationwide general strike, and growing opposition from business leaders, military reservists and civil society organizations, Netanyahu announced in March 2023 that the legislative process would be suspended to allow negotiations with the opposition.

Negotiations later broke down, and the coalition resumed advancing parts of the reform. In July 2023, the Knesset approved an amendment to Basic Law: The Judiciary preventing courts from applying the "reasonableness" standard to decisions of the government and its ministers. On 1 January 2024, the Supreme Court, sitting as the High Court of Justice, ruled by an 8–7 majority that the amendment was unconstitutional and struck it down.

Following the October 7 attacks, the opposition party National Unity joined the government to form an emergency national unity coalition, with Benny Gantz and Gadi Eisenkot joining the newly formed war cabinet. While the emergency coalition provided short-term stability, Netanyahu's government simultaneously faced sustained public and political pressure to resign and call for early elections. The emergency coalition eventually fractured, with Gideon Sa'ar's New Hope faction splitting from National Unity and resigning from the government in March 2024 before rejoining in September and ultimately agreeing in 2025 to merge with Likud. The remaining National Unity alliance formally departed the government on 9 June 2024. Otzma Yehudit temporarily exited the coalition in January 2025 in protest of a Gaza ceasefire agreement, and rejoined in March following the agreement's collapse.

The coalition's stability was repeatedly tested by internal ideological fractures, most notably regarding the politically volatile issue of Haredi military conscription. The instability reached a critical phase in July 2025, when both factions of United Torah Judaism (Degel HaTorah and Agudat Yisrael) resigned from the government in protest over the stalled conscription legislation. Shortly after, Shas also withdrew its ministers from the government, further weakening the coalition. While these parties often returned to their posts or remained in the coalition to avoid toppling the government, the recurring threat of collapse became a constant feature of Netanyahu's premiership. These fractures persisted until May 2026, when legislative momentum for dissolution grew across the political spectrum. However, with the Knesset nearing the completion of its full four-year term, these efforts would have only moved the election date forward by a few weeks.

== Date and electoral schedule ==
The Knesset formally dissolved on 17 July 2026. By completing its full four-year term, the 25th Knesset became the first Israeli legislature to serve its full duration without early dissolution since 1988, and the 37th government became the first to complete a full term since the 1973 election.

The candidate list submission began on 7 September, with the deadline the next day, 8 September, while the surplus-vote agreements deadline was 16 October.

Voting at diplomatic missions began on 15 October, with an eligible pool of 4,800 voters, and ended the following day, with a turnout of 86 percent, 17 points higher than the previous election.

Election day in Israel was 27 October. The official results were confirmed on 4 November. The new Knesset was sworn in on 10 November.

== Electoral system ==
The 120 seats in the Knesset are elected by closed list proportional representation in a single nationwide constituency. The electoral threshold for the election is 3.25%.

=== Expatriate voting and eligibility dispute ===
Because Israeli law does not permit absentee voting at embassies for ordinary citizens, participation requires physical travel. Ahead of the vote, more than 33,000 expatriates registered with the nonpartisan Fly&Vote initiative, drawing threats of legal action from Prime Minister Netanyahu over concerns they would lean opposition. Separately, a High Court petition by some 100 expats, removed from voter registries under the Interior Ministry's "Code 51" non-resident designation, was unanimously dismissed on procedural grounds on 2 September 2026.

=== Surplus-vote agreements ===
Two parties can sign a surplus-vote agreement that allows them to compete for leftover seats as if they were running together on the same list. The Bader–Ofer (D'Hondt) method slightly favours larger lists, meaning that alliances are more likely to receive leftover seats than parties would be individually. If the alliance receives leftover seats, the Bader–Ofer calculation is applied again, to determine how the seats are divided among the two allied lists. The following parties signed surplus vote-sharing agreements for the 2026 election:

- Together and Yisrael Beiteinu
- Yashar and The Democrats
- Joint List and Ra'am
- Likud and RZP–Zehut
- Shas and United Torah Judaism
- Brit Olam and Fixing the Electoral and Governing System

== Political parties ==
=== Factions before the election ===
The following table displays the composition of the 25th Knesset at its dissolution on 17 July 2026:

| Faction | Party | Ideology | Leader | Members | Status |
|---|---|---|---|---|---|
| Likud | | Conservatism (Israeli); Zionism; Right-wing populism | Benjamin Netanyahu | 32 | Governing coalition |
| Yesh Atid | | Liberalism (Israeli); Liberal Zionism; Secularism | Yair Lapid | 24 | Opposition |
| Shas | | Haredi Sephardic/Mizrahi interests; Religious conservatism; Social conservatism | Aryeh Deri | 11 | Governing coalition |
| National Unity (Note: After National Unity dissolved in July 2025, Benny Gantz renamed the faction name to "Blue and White-National Unity" to preserve the alliance's name.) | Blue and White | Liberalism (Israeli); Liberal Zionism | Benny Gantz | 8 | Opposition |
| Otzma Yehudit | | Kahanism; Ultranationalism | Itamar Ben-Gvir | 7 | Governing coalition |
| United Torah Judaism | Degel HaTorah | Haredi-Ashkenazi interests; Religious conservatism; Social conservatism | Moshe Gafni | 7 | Opposition |
| United Torah Judaism | Agudat Yisrael | Haredi-Ashkenazi interests; Religious conservatism; Social conservatism | Moshe Gafni | 7 | Opposition |
| Religious Zionist Party | | Religious Zionism; Ultraconservatism; Ultranationalism | Bezalel Smotrich | 6 | Governing coalition |
| Yisrael Beiteinu | | Zionism; Secularism; Russian Jewish interests | Avigdor Lieberman | 6 | Opposition |
| Ra'am | | Islamism; Social conservatism | Mansour Abbas | 5 | Opposition |
| Hadash–Ta'al | Hadash | Israeli Arab interests; Secularism; Socialism | Ayman Odeh | 5 | Opposition |
| Hadash–Ta'al | Ta'al | Israeli Arab interests; Secularism; Socialism | Ayman Odeh | 5 | Opposition |
| Labor | The Democrats (Note: Although the Israeli Labor Party and Meretz (which was not represented in the Knesset) merged to form the Democrats already in 2024, a request to rename the faction accordingly was denied by the Knesset's House Committee in February 2025.) | Social democracy; Liberal Zionism (Note: The Democrats were founded by the merger of two labor Zionist parties, Israeli Labor Party and Meretz, but The Democrats define themselves as "liberal-democratic Zionist", not officially "labor Zionism".) | Yair Golan (of party); Efrat Rayten (of faction) | 4 | Opposition |
| New Hope (Note: New Hope and Likud signed a merger agreement in 2025, and candidates from New Hope were placed alongside Likud candidates on the 2026 election party list.) | | National liberalism; Economic liberalism; Zionism | Gideon Sa'ar | 4 | Governing coalition |
| Noam | | Religious Zionism; Religious conservatism; Fundamentalism | Avi Maoz | 1 | Unaffiliated |

=== Outgoing members ===
The table below lists all members of the Knesset (MKs) who did not stand for re-election.

List of retiring members of the 25th Knesset
| Party | Name | Year first elected | Date announced |
|---|---|---|---|
| Blue and White | Yael Ron Ben-Moshe | 2020 | 26 August 2026 (Note: The candidate announced their retirement from the party and did not appear on any other party's electoral list.) |
| Blue and White | Michael Biton | 2019 | 8 September 2026 |
| Blue and White | Benny Gantz | 2019 | 19 October 2026 (Note: As part of Blue and White's withdrawal from the election) |
| Blue and White | Alon Schuster | 2019 | 19 October 2026 |
| Blue and White | Pnina Tamano-Shata | 2013 | 19 October 2026 |
| Democrats (Note: Michaeli was elected to the Knesset as a member of the Israeli Labor Party.) | Merav Michaeli | 2013 | 7 December 2023 |
| Hadash–Ta'al | Ayman Odeh | 2015 | 16 May 2023 |
| Hadash–Ta'al | Aida Touma-Suleiman | 2015 | 16 May 2026 (Note: No official announcement was made. Suleiman did not seek re-nomination at her party's primary conference, held 16 May 2026.) |
| Hadash–Ta'al | Samir Bin Said | 2025 (Note: Entered the Knesset as part of a rotation agreement between Hadash and Ta'al, following the resignation of Youssef Atauna) | 8 September 2026 |
| New Hope | Michel Buskila | 2022 (Note: Became a member of the Knesset following the resignation of six members of the New Hope list between June 2021 and August 2022) | 8 September 2026 (Note: Did not appear on Likud's electoral list) |
| New Hope | Akram Hasson | 2012 (Note: Entered the Knesset following the death of Gideon Ezra) | 8 September 2026 |
| Likud | Galit Distel-Atbaryan | 2021 | 25 May 2026 |
| Likud | Eliyahu Revivo | 2022 | 13 August 2026 |
| Likud | Moshe Passal | 2023 (Note: Entered the Knesset following the resignation of Galit Distel-Atbaryan, who later returned to the Knesset under the Norwegian Law.) | 13 August 2026 |
| Likud | Tsega Melaku | 2023 (Note: Entered the Knesset following the resignation of Ofir Akunis.) | 14 August 2026 |
| Likud | Yuli Edelstein | 1996 | 4 September 2026 (Note: Edelstein announced his retirement from Likud, and joined Unity, which dropped out of the election on 4 September. He did not appear on any other party's electoral list.) |
| Likud | Eli Dellal | 2022 | 8 September 2026 (Note: Participated in Likud's internal primary elections but did not appear on the final list) |
| Likud | Nissim Vaturi | 2020 | 8 September 2026 |
| Otzma Yehudit | Zvika Fogel | 2022 | 6 September 2026 |
| Religious Zionist | Ofir Sofer | 2019 | 15 July 2026 |
| Religious Zionist | Moshe Solomon | 2022 | 16 July 2026 |
| Religious Zionist | Michal Waldiger | 2021 | 8 September 2026 |
| Shas | Ya'akov Margi | 2003 | 24 May 2026 |
| United Torah Judaism | Moshe Gafni | 1988 | 5 September 2026 |
| United Torah Judaism | Uri Maklev | 2008 (Note: Entered the Knesset through an internal party rotation agreement. First elected in 2009.) | 5 September 2026 |
| Yesh Atid (Note: Part of Together.) | Yaron Levi | 2023 (Note: Entered the Knesset following the resignation of Orna Barbivai.) | 4 May 2026 |
| Yesh Atid | Meir Cohen | 2013 | 31 August 2026 |
| Yesh Atid | Mickey Levy | 2013 | 31 August 2026 |
| Yesh Atid | Debbie Biton | 2022 | 1 September 2026 |
| Yesh Atid | Tania Mazarsky | 2021 | 1 September 2026 |
| Yesh Atid | Karine Elharrar | 2013 | 3 September 2026 |
| Yesh Atid | Michal Shir | 2019 | 4 September 2026 |
| Yisrael Beiteinu | Sharon Nir | 2022 | 29 August 2026 |

=== Contesting parties ===
38 parties submitted lists, with their electoral symbols also listed below.

| Name | Symbol | |
|---|---|---|
| Amcha Yisrael | ך | خ |
| Ani VeAta | פה | ف ه |
| The Bible Bloc | יק | ي ق |
| The Color Black, Guarding the World of Torah | נר | ن ر |
| The Democrats | אמת | أ م ت |
| Dawn's Light, a Party for Everyone | בקר | ب ق ر |
| Eternal Covenant | זץ | ز ص |
| Fixing the Electoral and Governing System | נקי | ن ق ي |
| Garden of Eden | ה | ه |
| Hakahal Party | רץ | ر ص |
| Haredi Public | זך | ز خ |
| Tzomet-Beit Yisrael | בי | ب ي |
| Israel First | י | ي |
| Joint List | ודם | و ض م |
| Just Law | קץ | ق ص |
| Likud | מחל | م ح ل |
| New Order | קך | ق خ |
| Noam | ני | ن ي |
| Otzma Yehudit | ב | ب |
| Partnership for Everyone | ד | ض |
| Personal Security | נץ | ن ص |
| Pirate Party of Israel | צף | ص ف |
| Redemption | ק | ق |
| Religious Zionist Party and Zehut | ט | ط |
| The Reservists and the New Economic Party | די | د ي |
| Sharshar for Love and Unity of the People | צדק | ص د ق |
| Shas | שס | ش س |
| Shema | נף | ن ف |
| Social Security | ז | ز |
| Together | רק | رق |
| Together We Will Succeed | בד | ب د |
| Ra'am | עם | ع م |
| United Torah Judaism | ג | ج |
| Women's Voice | קה | ق ه |
| Yashar | דרך | د ر خ |
| Yisrael Beiteinu | ל | ل |

=== Withdrawn parties ===
The following parties withdrew from the election after the list submission date.

- Blue and White stated its intention to withdraw from the ballot on 19 October 2026.
- The Ahi party, headed by Haim Yosef Abergel, withdrew on 23 October, following a meeting between Abergel and former Chief Rabbi Shlomo Amar, as well as Almog Cohen, Minister Yoav Kisch and Lior Katzav, who arrived as Benjamin Netanyahu's representative.

=== Abandoned bids ===
The following parties, which did not have representation in the Knesset prior to the 2026 election, expressed interest but chose not to contest it:

- A Whole and Strong Jewish Israel: The party, founded by far right activists Michael Ben-Ari and Baruch Marzel, was initially barred by the Registrar of Political Parties following a recommendation from the Shin Bet, though it was later allowed to run.
- Amir Avivi, founder of The Security Zionists, was planning to establish a new, centre-right party. He abandoned his plans fearing that too many parties running would have made it difficult for the right wing to win the election.
- Unity dropped out on 4 September 2026.
- The Zionist Home – The Reservists alliance split on 5 September, with Hili Tropper joining Yashar, while Yoaz Hendel allied with the New Economic Party. Hendel and Tropper emphasized in a joint statement that they would continue working together, even if they are not part of the same party.
- The leaders of Standing Together launched an "Arab-Jewish party" on 16 June 2026 called A Place for Us All. The party is distinct from the movement. It decided not to submit a list on 8 September.
- Wajdi Sarhan, a former commander of the IDF, launched a new Druze party called "Brotherhood Alliance" on 4 May 2026. The party did not submit a list to run in the election.

=== Electoral negotiations and exploratory talks ===
- Beginning in April 2026, Benny Gantz held negotiations with Yoaz Hendel from The Reservists over a merger, with some talks also including Yaron Zelekha from the New Economic Party. By June, they also included former Fire and Rescue Commissioner Dedi Simchi, which reportedly reached a stalemate in early August. Talks between Gantz and Hendel stalled over the possibility of a coalition with Haredi parties, which Hendel staunchly opposed, and talks collapsed by early July. Hendel partnered instead with Hili Tropper as "Foundations of Israel". Gantz later reportedly held talks with Ayelet Shaked for a potential alliance. Gilad Erdan of Unity also met with Tropper for negotiations, but the two differed in their willingness to coalition with The Democrats. By late August, Erdan also held later-confirmed talks with Gantz on an electoral alliance. In the final party list submission, two lists represented this "third bloc": Blue and White, and a joint list between Zelekha and Hendel.
- Prime Minister Benjamin Netanyahu proposed an alliance in August between Otzma Yehudit and the Religious Zionist Party, which Otzma head Itamar Ben-Gvir strongly opposed. Polling by Otzma indicated that a merger would weaken that party, while Amcha Yisrael, a new party headed by Ofer Winter, would benefit. Netanyahu called for a meeting of the two parties, which Ben-Gvir dismissed. Likud, in response, accused Ben-Gvir of wanting to "burn tens of thousands of right-wing votes." The two parties had previously agreed to run together in the 2022 election, after Netanyahu brokered a similar agreement between the two, which resulted in the joint list winning 14 seats.
- From late summer 2025 to mid-2026, key opposition leaders held bilateral and multi-party meetings to coordinate strategy against the government. In September 2025, Yisrael Beiteinu's Avigdor Lieberman, Yesh Atid's Yair Lapid, Yashar's Gadi Eisenkot, and The Democrats' Yair Golan established a "permanent forum" focused on developing a policy platform for a national constitution, universal military conscription, and preservation of the Jewish, democratic, and Zionist character of the state. Lieberman also issued policy guidelines for a post-Netanyahu coalition. Broader attempts at a unified multi-party alliance, particularly involving Naftali Bennett, Eisenkot, and Lapid, faced friction over leadership positioning. Ultimately, Bennett and Lapid reached an agreement to run on a Bennett-led joint electoral list named Together in April 2026. The five opposition leaders (Eisenkot, Bennett, Lapid, Golan and Lieberman) signed a document in late September 2026 in which they pledged "not to attack each other on the campaign trail" and to work together to increase turnout.

== Leadership elections and primaries ==
Leadership elections have been held by some parties to determine party leadership ahead of the election. Primary elections are held by some parties in advance of the national election to determine the composition of their party list.

=== Balad ===
Balad held its party primary on 27 June 2026. Sami Abu Shehadeh was re-elected as party leader, while the rest of the list included Bechar Aouda, Maher Karkabi Sabah, Hassan Nasarsa and Orly Noy, board chairwoman at B'Tselem and the list's first Jewish candidate.

=== The Democrats ===
Following Labor's poor electoral performance in the 2022 election, in which it won the minimum seats needed for entry into the Knesset and Meretz failed to cross the electoral threshold, party chair Merav Michaeli announced in December 2023 that she planned to resign. Yair Golan won a landslide victory in Labor's May 2024 leadership primary election on a platform promising to unify the political left. Labor and Meretz agreed to merge in July 2024, forming a new political party called The Democrats, with Golan serving as the unified party leader. The new party approved the merger in May 2026. The Democrats held a digital primary on 20 July 2026, with 97,000 of its 112,000 registered members casting ballots, an 86 per cent turnout. Party leader Golan secured the top spot on the list, followed by serving MKs Naama Lazimi, Gilad Kariv, and Efrat Rayten.

=== Hadash ===
Hadash closed its primary nominations on 14 May; the parties committee, known as the National Council, was allowed to cast ballots. The party held its primary two days later; former MK Yousef Jabareen defeated Shukry Awouda for the position of chairman. Incumbent leader Ayman Odeh and MK Aida Touma-Suleiman did not stand for re-election. It was the first party to select its electoral slate before the election. The Hadash list included Jabareen, Jafar Farah, Ofer Cassif, Youssef Atauna and Nihaya Washahi. Farah, who was placed fourth on the Joint List, withdrew from the race following sexual harassment claims and was replaced by Faten Ghattas.

=== Likud ===
Likud formalized an agreement in August 2025 for the New Hope party to merge into it ahead of the next election. The merger has not been approved by the Knesset House Committee as of July 2026. Following multiple legal battles and postponements, the party's primary elections were rescheduled from 4 to 17 August 2026. The internal race has been marked by disputes over Prime Minister Benjamin Netanyahu's push to expand reserved slots, alongside a party court ruling that barred incumbent lawmakers and ministers from running in regional district spots. On 17 August, the 2026 Likud primary was held with a 53% turnout for a total of 76,068 party members voting. Party members voted for their preferred candidates with reserved slots for specific regional districts and for party leader Benjamin Netanyahu. The top candidates in the resulting party list are Netanyahu, Eli Cohen and Amir Ohana.

=== Ra'am ===
The Ra'am party announced in late July 2026 that it would hold its first independent primary on 22 August. The party's list includes Mansour Abbas, Walid Taha, Waleed Alhwashla, Iman Khatib-Yasin (in the reserved woman's slot) and Yasser Hujirat.

=== Religious Zionist Party ===
The Religious Zionist Party re-elected party leader Bezalel Smotrich in September 2025. In July 2026, the party held primaries to determine its electoral slate for the upcoming election, with 130 members of the parties' Central Committee voting to select candidates. Smotrich retained his position at the head of the list, followed by incumbent lawmakers Orit Strook, Simcha Rothman, Zvi Sukkot, and Ohad Tal. The final list remains subject to adjustments, as Smotrich retains the authority to appoint two reserved seats, including an expected spot for Tzvika Mor.

=== The Reservists ===
Yoaz Hendel was elected head of the The Reservists party on 9 June. A week later, the party held their primaries.

== Opinion polls ==
Local regression of polls conducted

== Results ==
The final results were published on 4 November.

More than 300,000 votes were cast for parties which did not pass the electoral threshold.

| Party | Votes | % | Seats | +/– |
|---|---|---|---|---|
| Likud | 1,167,591 | 20.51 | 27 | −9 (Note: includes Gideon Saar's New Hope party's 4 seats) |
| Yashar | 913,629 | 16.05 | 21 | New |
| Together | 532,018 | 9.35 | 12 | −12 |
| Joint List | 500,755 | 8.80 | 11 | +6 |
| The Democrats | 366,278 | 6.44 | 8 | +4 |
| Ra'am | 337,720 | 5.93 | 8 | +3 |
| Yisrael Beiteinu | 337,450 | 5.93 | 7 | +1 |
| Otzma Yehudit | 326,793 | 5.74 | 7 | +1 |
| United Torah Judaism | 312,632 | 5.49 | 7 | 0 |
| Shas | 299,533 | 5.26 | 6 | −5 |
| Religious Zionism – Zehut | 290,549 | 5.11 | 6 | −1 |
| The Reservists – New Economic | 155,199 | 2.73 | 0 | 0 |
| Amcha Yisrael | 95,764 | 1.68 | 0 | New |
| The Color Black | 11,271 | 0.20 | 0 | New |
| Haredi Public | 10,604 | 0.19 | 0 | New |
| Noam | 9,928 | 0.17 | 0 | −1 |
| Tzomet – Beit Yisrael | 5,713 | 0.10 | 0 | 0 |
| Partnership for Everyone | 4,077 | 0.07 | 0 | New |
| Sharshar for Love and Unity of the People | 2,086 | 0.04 | 0 | New |
| Together We Will Succeed | 1,438 | 0.03 | 0 | New |
| Pirate Party of Israel | 1,049 | 0.02 | 0 | 0 |
| Israel First – Ale Yarok | 933 | 0.02 | 0 | 0 |
| New Order | 918 | 0.02 | 0 | 0 |
| Hakahal Party | 871 | 0.02 | 0 | New |
| Just Law | 778 | 0.01 | 0 | New |
| Fixing the Electoral and Governing System | 761 | 0.01 | 0 | New |
| Dawn's Light | 747 | 0.01 | 0 | New |
| Women's Voice | 712 | 0.01 | 0 | New |
| Kahal | 580 | 0.01 | 0 | New |
| Tkuma | 569 | 0.01 | 0 | 0 |
| Shema | 524 | 0.01 | 0 | New |
| Social Security | 501 | 0.01 | 0 | New |
| Personal Security | 482 | 0.01 | 0 | New |
| The Bible Bloc | 399 | 0.01 | 0 | 0 |
| Garden of Eden | 322 | 0.01 | 0 | 0 |
| Eternal Covenant | 252 | 0.00 | 0 | New |
| Blue and White (withdrawn) | 0 | 0.00 | – | −8 |
| Achi (withdrawn) | 0 | 0.00 | – | – |
| Total | 5,691,426 | 100.00 | 120 | 0 |
| Valid votes | 5,691,426 | 99.55 | | |
| Invalid/blank votes | 25,971 | 0.45 | | |
| Total votes | 5,717,397 | 100.00 | | |
| Registered voters/turnout | 7,331,981 | 77.98 | | |
Source: Central Elections Committee

=== By bloc ===
Seat changes are counted from the blocs' seats in the 2022 election: 64 for the Netanyahu bloc, 46 for the non-Arab parties of the anti-Netanyahu bloc (Yesh Atid, National Unity, Yisrael Beiteinu and Labor), and 10 for the Arab parties (Ra'am and Hadash–Ta'al).

| Party | Votes | % | Seats | +/– |
|---|---|---|---|---|
| Netanyahu's bloc (Likud + UTJ + Otzma + Shas + RZP–Zehut) | 2,397,098 | 42.12 | 53 | −11 |
| Eisenkot's bloc (Yashar + Together + Democrats + Yisrael Beiteinu) | 2,149,375 | 37.77 | 48 | +2 |
| Arab parties (Joint List + Ra'am) | 838,475 | 14.73 | 19 | +9 |
| Others | 306,478 | 5.38 | 0 | 0 |
| Total | 5,691,426 | 100.00 | 120 | 0 |
Source: Central Elections Committee

=== Coalition results by district ===
| District | Right-wing (Note: Consisting of Likud, Religious Zionist Party, Otzma Yehudit, Shas, and UTJ.) | Center-left (Note: Consisting of Yashar, Together, Yisrael Beiteinu, and the Democrats.) | Arab parties (Note: Consisting of the Joint List and Ra'am.) | Reservists | Amcha Yisrael | Other parties | Total votes |
|---|---|---|---|---|---|---|---|
| Central | 558,317 | 634,932 | 106,448 | 48,802 | 27,519 | 8,597 | 1,384,615 |
| Haifa | 209,502 | 273,398 | 137,432 | 17,072 | 8,490 | 4,474 | 650,368 |
| Jerusalem | 284,294 | 89,468 | 19,839 | 8,309 | 7,678 | 11,483 | 421,071 |
| Judea and Samaria | 187,608 | 32,087 | 126 | 5,156 | 7,360 | 4,799 | 237,136 |
| Northern | 221,769 | 237,893 | 394,359 | 13,719 | 10,518 | 5,689 | 883,947 |
| Southern | 394,521 | 197,519 | 139,412 | 20,352 | 11,200 | 7,305 | 770,309 |
| Tel Aviv | 335,235 | 502,114 | 14,478 | 24,236 | 11,124 | 6,719 | 893,906 |
| “Double envelope” voting (Note: For voters outside of their registered precinct, mostly soldiers but also police officers, hospital workers, and prisoners.) | 205,852 | 181,964 | 26,381 | 17,553 | 11,875 | 6,449 | 450,074 |
| Total | 2,397,098 | 2,149,375 | 838,475 | 155,199 | 95,764 | 55,515 | 5,691,426 |

=== Members of the Knesset who lost their seats ===
List of members who lost their seats
| Party | Name | Year first elected |
|---|---|---|
| Likud | Avihai Boaron | 2023 (Note: Entered the Knesset as a replacement via the Norwegian law) |
| Likud | Ze'ev Elkin | 2006 |
| Likud | May Golan | April 2019 |
| Likud | Amit Halevi | 2020 |
| Likud | Hanoch Milwidsky | 2022 |
| New Hope | Sharren Haskel | 2015 |
| Noam | Avi Maoz | 2021 |
| Religious Zionist | Zvi Sukkot | 2023 |
| Religious Zionist | Ohad Tal | 2022 |
| Shas | | |
| Shas | Moshe Abutbul | September 2019 |
| Shas | Erez Malul | 2023 |
| Shas | Yonatan Mishraki | 2023 |
| Shas | Aryeh Deri | 1992 (Note: Resigned from the Knesset) |
| United Torah Judaism | Ya'akov Tessler | April 2019 |
| Yesh Atid | Vladimir Beliak | 2020 |
| Yesh Atid | Simon Davidson | 2021 |
| Yesh Atid | Yasmin Fridman | 2021 |
| Yesh Atid | Yorai Lahav-Hertzanu | April 2019 |
| Yesh Atid | Roni Malkai | 2026 |
| Yesh Atid | Matti Sarfati Harkavi | 2022 |
| Yesh Atid | Naor Shiri | 2022 |
| Yesh Atid | Shelly Tal Meron | 2023 |
| Yesh Atid | Moshe Tur-Paz | 2021 |
| Yisrael Beiteinu | Evgeny Sova | April 2019 |

== Aftermath ==
Due to neither the Netanyahu bloc nor the change bloc being predicted to win a majority, The Guardian stated, based on exit polls, that the election was likely to result in weeks of competition to determine who could form a government. The election was marked by record voting turnout by Arab citizens of Israel. Based on the exit polls showing successful results for the Arab parties, University of California political scientist Dov Waxman predicted that this could be the first government relying on outside support from Arab parties since the 1993–1995 government led by Yitzhak Rabin. BBC diplomatic correspondent Paul Adams stated that Israeli Arabs, who usually have lower turnout than Jewish Israelis, were motivated to vote in order to defeat Netanyahu.

Yashar leader Gadi Eisenkot said that the election was a vote of no-confidence in Prime Minister Benjamin Netanyahu. Former prime minister Yair Lapid called it a "total collapse" of the Likud bloc. Ushar Gabai, assistant to far-right Otzma Yehudit leader Itamar Ben-Gvir, told reporters: "Obviously I'm disappointed, the people of Israel are stupid." Netanyahu stated that he did not view the election as a defeat. He claimed that the majority of the "Zionist public" voted for the right-wing parties, and that the Knesset "must establish a strong, right-wing, nationalist government", and dismissed the idea of forming a coalition with the Arab parties. Political analyst Abed Abou Shhadeh pointed out the possibility that one of the parties of the opposition bloc "goes rogue" and joins Netanyahu's bloc.

By 5:15 PM IST on 28 October 2026, the Netanyahu-led bloc (Likud, Otzma Yehudit, United Torah Judaism, Shas, and the Religious Zionist Party) had gained a plurality of seats in the Knesset of around 53 seats, compared to the Eisenkot-led opposition (Yashar, Together, Democrats, and Yisrael Beiteinu) of 48 seats.

A panel of CEC members voted on 4 November to approve the results, with three (Sohlberg, as well as representatives from Yesh Atid and Blue and White) in favor, none against and two members of Likud and Shas abstaining. The full CEC voted the same day, with 15 in favor, two opposed and 14 abstaining. Sohlberg afterwards presented the official election results to president Isaac Herzog.

The new Knesset was sworn in on 10 November, with 47 new MKs.

The Knesset formed an Arrangements Committee of 22 members, chaired by Yashar MK Roy Folkman, in early November with a Knesset vote of 63 in favor to 50 opposed. The organization of the committee gave the Yashar bloc greater influence, after two proposals by Likud MK Ofir Katz, which would have given the Likud bloc more seats than the Yashar bloc, were rejected.

=== Conduct ===
The ruling Likud party claimed in a statement that the election had been "stolen by Arab parties" after partial election results were released on 28 October. These results left Netanyahu's coalition short of a majority and predicted a record 19 seats for Arab-led parties. The party demanded that the Israel Police and Shin Bet immediately begin an investigation into alleged widespread irregularities in Arab communities, which they asserted included cash bribery, voter intimidation, double voting, and the use of illegal mobilization software.

Likud's statement alleged that Arab-majority parties "support terrorism and the destruction of the Jewish state". An independent fact-checker pointed out that Likud did not offer any public proof to support its allegations of systematic fraud. Director of the CEC Dean Livne disputed charges of massive voter fraud, stating that he sees no probability of allegations of election fraud influencing the results. The rhetoric was denounced by representatives of Ra'am and the Joint List, who accused Netanyahu of using false incitement to undermine Arab citizens' democratic participation and divert attention away from the poor performance of his coalition. According to watchdog groups, in case the coalition failed to win a parliamentary majority, Likud operatives had prepared "rigged election" narratives weeks before the campaign.

Likud claimed that get-out-the-vote organizations received illegal foreign funding from Turkey and Qatar. Shin Bet was instructed to investigate the matter by CEC Chairman Noam Sohlberg. Itamar Ben-Gvir, the minister of national security, called for arrests. Eisenkot called for the legal investigation to continue but warned Netanyahu against using unsubstantiated suspicions to postpone the swearing-in of the new Knesset. Arab party leaders and The Democrats leader Yair Golan vehemently denounced the rhetoric as an ugly campaign to delegitimize Arab Israeli citizens, with Golan adding that any genuine suspicion of damage to the integrity of the elections must be investigated. The accusations were vehemently denied by both Turkey and Qatar, with Turkey dismissing them as fake propaganda and Qatar denouncing them as baseless political scapegoating.

=== Government formation ===
President Isaac Herzog announced on 1 November that he would invite party leaders, beginning 4 November, to begin the consultation process to determine who should be given the first choice to form a government.

Together leader Naftali Bennett announced the same day that his party would recommend Gadi Eisenkot as prime minister. The Democrats head Yair Golan announced on 2 November that it would also recommend Eisenkot. Despite expressing skepticism on the coalition formation, Yisrael Beiteinu leader Avigdor Lieberman stated that day that he will recommend Eisenkot as prime minister.

Eisenkot subsequently received the backing of the two major Arab-majority lists. Ra'am declared on 4 November that it would recommend Eisenkot, increasing his initial total to 56 recommendations. The Joint List did the same on 5 November, declaring that they had unanimously decided to support him in order to prevent Netanyahu from taking office again. Eisenkot received an absolute majority of 67 recommendations out of the 120-seat Knesset following the support of both Arab-led lists. The Joint List stated during discussions with Herzog that it would provide external support to the opposition-led minority government without joining the coalition. When asked about a possible military campaign, party leaders clarified that they would not overthrow the government in the event of a security crisis. However, despite these endorsements, Zionist opposition bloc leaders continued to disagree about formal governing cooperation with the Arab parties.

On 8 November, Herzog officially presented the mandate to Eisenkot and tasked him to form a new government. The law states that the candidate tasked has 28 days to form a government with the possibility of an extension for another 14 days, if needed. Ra'am declared that even in the absence of a formal coalition agreement, it would vote to back a government headed by Eisenkot.

| Possible governments | Seats |
|---|---|
| Total seats | 120 |
Governments with a majority (61 or more seats)
| Yashar–Together–Dems–YB + JL & Ra'am | 67 |
| Likud–Yashar–Together–YB | 67 |
| Likud–Yashar–Together–UTJ | 67 |
| Likud–Yashar–Together–Shas | 66 |
| Likud–Yashar–Together–RZP–Zehut | 66 |
| Yashar–Together–Dems–YB + Ra'am & UTJ | 63 |
| Yashar–Together–Dems–YB + UTJ & Shas (Note: Also includes the possibility of joining the government to form a majority coalition rather than a confidence and supply deal.) | 61 |
Governments without a majority (60 or fewer seats)
| Yashar–Together–Dems–YB + Ra'am | 56 |
| Likud–Otzma–UTJ–Shas–RZP–Zehut (Note: Governing coalition before election – 37th Government.) | 53 |
| Yashar–Together–Dems–YB | 48 |

== See also ==
- Party lists for the 2026 Israeli legislative election
- Elections in Israel
