= Yehuda Weisfish =

Israeli politician

- יהודה וייספיש

Faction represented in the Knesset
- 2026–: Degel HaTorah

Personal details
- Born: 6 November 1985 (age 41) Ashdod, Israel

Yehuda Weisfish (Hebrew: יהודה וייספיש, born 6 November 1985) is an Israeli politician.

== Biography ==
Weisfish was born in Ashdod to Yahushua David Weisfish.

In 2011 Weisfish established the first Internet café in Modi'in Illit.

Weisfish is the funder and chairman of the Union of Yeshiva students, and a close associate of Rabbi Moshe Hillel Hirsch, one of the rabbinical leaders of Degel HaTorah.

Weisfish was selected to run as member of Degel HaTorah party in the 2026 Israeli legislative election and was elected to the Knesset.
