= Eliakim Stark =

Israeli politician

- אליקים שטארק

Faction represented in the Knesset
- 2026–: Agudat Yisrael

Personal details
- Born: 27 May 1991 (age 35) Antwerp, Belgium

Eliakim Stark (Hebrew: אליקים שטארק, born 27 May 1991) is an Israeli politician.

== Early life ==
Stark was born in Antwerp, Belgium. He moved to Israel at age 16 to study at the Belz Yeshiva in Rishon LeZion. He later become a rosh chaburah (group leader) at the Mir Yeshiva in Jerusalem.

== Political career ==
On October 2026, in the lead up to the 2026 Israeli legislative election, Stark was appointed to replace the retiring Yisrael Eichler as Belz's representative in the Agudat Yisrael party, which traditionally runs as part of the United Torah Judaism list. He was elected to the 26th Knesset.
