= Noam (political party) =

Far-right religious-conservative political party in Israel

Noam for Israel נעם לישראל
- Chairman: Avi Maoz
- Spiritual leader: Zvi Thau
- Founded: 15 July 2019; 7 years ago
- Ideology: Religious Zionism; Religious conservatism; Social conservatism; Ultraconservatism; Anti-LGBTQ
- Political position: Far-right
- Religion: Orthodox Judaism (Chardal)
- National affiliation: Religious Zionist Party (2021–2022; 2022)
- Colours: Blue; Light blue
- Slogan: A Normal Nation in Our Own Land
- Knesset: 0 / 120

Election symbol
- כ / ك (until 2026) ני / ‌ن‌ي‌‌‌‌‌ (since 2026)

Website
- www.noamlisrael.org.il

Noam (Hebrew: נֹעַם, lit. 'Pleasantness'; officially known as Lazuz) is a far-right Orthodox Jewish, Religious Zionist political party in Israel, officially established in July 2019 by an extremely conservative faction in the Religious Zionist community inspired by Rabbi Zvi Thau and his Har Hamor yeshiva. The party's main goal is to advance policies against LGBT rights, and against what its backers call "the destruction of the family". Avi Maoz, the party's leader, was elected to the Knesset in 2021, and was the party's sole representative. The party lost its Knesset seat in the 2026 Israeli legislative election.

== History ==
Noam was founded in July 2019. Its basis is in rabbi Zvi Thau and his Har Hamor yeshiva. Thau and his followers believed that The Jewish Home, then led by Rafi Peretz, and Tkuma, led by Bezalel Smotrich, hadn't sufficiently advanced Jewish values, particularly in the realm of opposition to LGBT rights, protection of the Shabbat as a day of rest, and the protection of the Orthodox conversion process. Following Thau's disappointment with the Union of the Right-Wing Parties, he and his followers decided to form the Noam party. While Thau is the party's spiritual leader, rabbi Dror Aryeh became the party's political leader. Another student of Thau involved in the creation of the party was rabbi Shlomo Aviner. He said that: "The party will fight against the destruction of the family, against the destruction of conversion, against the destruction of Shabbat, against the destruction of the Western Wall, and against the use of deviant content in the IDF and the Education Ministry."

The Noam party was reported to be in talks with the Otzma Yehudit party, which had recently split from the United Right, for a possible joint run. Thau endorsed the joint ticket, marking the first time he had explicitly endorsed a political party. On 28 July, Noam and Otzma Yehudit agreed to run on a joint list for the September 2019 Israeli legislative election. The agreement between Noam and Otzma Yehudit was dissolved on 1 August 2019 because Noam disagreed with Otzma having secular Jewish candidates. Noam filed to run alone, before withdrawing from the race on 15 September.

The party formed a joint list with Otzma Yehudit, after allowing women and secular candidates on the list, prior to the 2021 Israeli legislative election. Both parties then ran on a joint list with the Religious Zionist Party, with the party's leader, Avi Maoz, receiving the sixth spot. Maoz was subsequently elected to the Knesset as the list won six seats.

The three parties agreed to run jointly in the 2022 Israeli legislative election on 14 September 2022, with Maoz receiving the 11th spot. On 20 November 2022, both Noam and Otzma Yehudit split from the RZP, ending their technical bloc. On 27 November 2022, Noam reached a coalition agreement with Likud. On 3 January 2023, Maoz became a Deputy Minister in the Prime Minister's Office, responsible for external programs in the Ministry of Education. Maoz left the government in March 2025.

Ahead of the 2026 Israeli legislative election, Eliyahu Libman, one of the co-founders of Tikva Forum, joined Noam's list. The party launched its election campaign a week later, naming Beersheba deputy mayor Shimon Tubul as another candidate on its list and rebranding itself as Noam for Israel. The party was under the electoral threshold, winning less than ten thousand votes. The party acknowledged its poor performance in a letter written to party activists, focusing on an inability to retain previous voters or attract votes from the "Haredi public" and "traditional voters." Members of the party also held meetings to discuss the outcome. Noam faced funding difficulties after the election and is unable to pay staff members.

== Political and religious positions ==
Noam argues that public sector entities, including the Ministry of Education and the IDF, have been infiltrated by what their 2019 platform refers to as "radical liberal agendas", "LGBT and Reform organizations", and "foreign entities ... promoting a liberal and feminist worldview".

The party advocates for what it terms "traditional family values", opposes abortion rights, same-sex marriage, and LGBT rights, and additionally supports stricter restrictions during the Sabbath and granting more authority to the Chief Rabbinate of Israel, with Maoz stating in 2022 that Noam will "... introduce a fourth branch of government, the Chief Rabbinate".

== Controversies ==
The party released a video under the comment: "An entire country is going through conversion therapy. The time has come to stop it." In the video, a mother, father, and son go to vote on election day in September 2019, and the family is bombarded with LGBT and Reform imagery. Once they reach the voting booth, the mother writes on her voting slip, "Let my son marry a woman", while the father writes, "Let my grandson be Jewish". The video was removed by YouTube for violating its terms of use.

In 2022, Ynet reported that Noam was keeping a list of women advising the Gender Affairs Advisor to the Chief of Staff, as well as LGBT educators and members of the press. The lists drew criticism from public figures and politicians, including then-Prime Minister Yair Lapid.

== Election results ==
=== Knesset ===
Election	Leader	Votes	%	Seats	+/–	Government
2019	Dror Aryeh	Withdrew before elections				Extra-parliamentary
2021	Avi Maoz	with RZP (Note: 2021, received 225,641 or 5.12%) (Note: 2022, received 516,470 or 10.84%)		1 / 120	–	Opposition
2022	Avi Maoz	with RZP		1 / 120	Steady	Coalition
2026	Avi Maoz	9,928	0.17% (#16)	0 / 120	▼1	Extra-parliamentary

== Knesset members ==
Knesset	Members	Seats
24th	Avi Maoz	1
25th	Avi Maoz	1
