= Sharon Nir =

Israeli politician

- שרון ניר
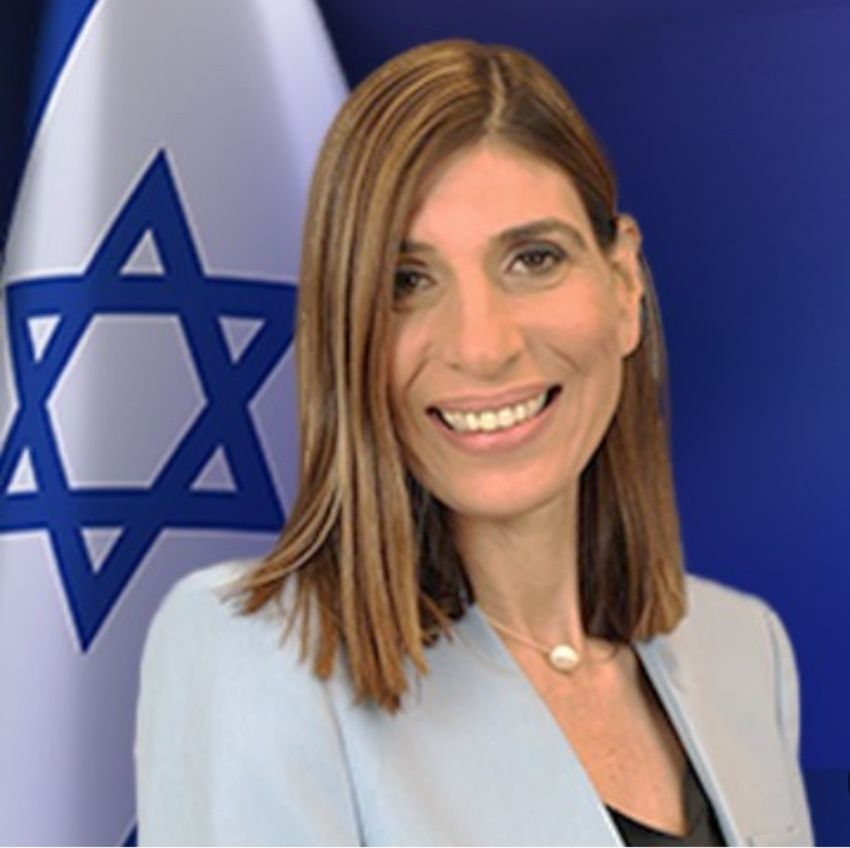

Faction represented in the Knesset
- 2022–2026: Yisrael Beiteinu

Personal details
- Born: 3 November 1970 (age 56) Haifa, Israel

Sharon Nir (Hebrew: שרון ניר; born 3 November 1970) is an Israeli politician who served as a member of the Knesset for Yisrael Beiteinu from 2022, following the 2022 Israeli legislative election, until 2026.

== Biography ==
Sharon Nir was born on 3 November 1970 in Haifa. Nir enlisted in the Israel Defense Forces in 1989, and was assigned to the C4I Corps. In 1990, she became an officer and a platoon commander in the 162nd Division. She later became the first woman to train officers for the C4I Corps.

In 2003, Nir was appointed to lead a new department responsible for planning and organization in the corps. In 2007, she was appointed commander of a Battalion in the Central Command, becoming the first woman to command an operational communications battalion. She commanded the battalion until 2009. In 2015, Nir was appointed to lead C4I's main Training Base. Becoming the first woman to hold the position. In 2016, she was made the Chief of Staff's advisor on Gender Affairs, a position she held until September 2019.

On 27 August 2022, It was announced that Nir had joined Yisrael Beiteinu. She was placed fourth in the party's electoral slate ahead of the 2022 election to the Knesset. Nir was elected to the Knesset and sworn in on 15 November.

Nir announced in August 2026 that she would not run in the 2026 Israeli legislative election.

== Personal life ==
Nir has a Bachelor's degree in behavioural sciences and a Master's degree in business management, both from Ben-Gurion University. She is also a graduate of the National Security College. Before entering politics, Nir worked as a lecturer for Reichman University.

Nir lives in Modi'in-Maccabim-Re'ut, and is married to Yariv Nir, who was also an officer for C4I. The couple has three children.
