= Avi Maoz =

Israeli politician

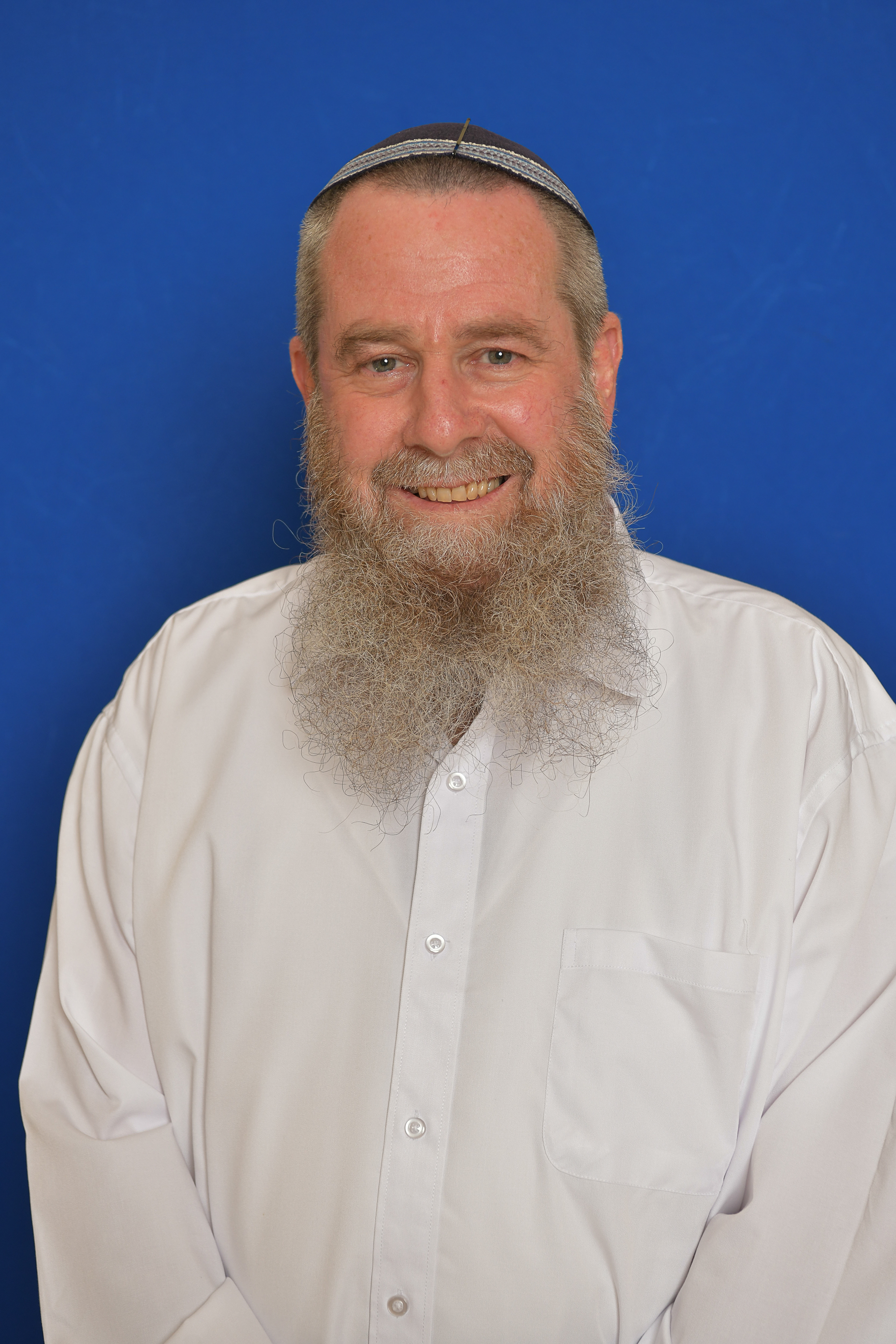
- Maoz in 2022

Faction represented in the Knesset
- 2021–2026: Noam

Personal details
- Born: 6 July 1956 (age 70) Haifa, Israel

Avigdor "Avi" Maoz (Hebrew: אביגדור "אבי" מעוז; born 6 July 1956) is an Israeli civil servant and politician. The leader of the far-right, religious conservative Noam party, he served as its sole member of the Knesset between 2021 and 2026.

== Biography ==
Maoz was born Avigdor Fischheimer in the Kiryat Shmuel neighborhood of Haifa. He is the son of Holocaust survivors Esther and Israel Fischheimer. In 1975, he enlisted in the IDF, and in 1977, he was a partner in establishing the settlement Migdal Oz in Gush Etzion, and was later the secretary of the Kibbutz. Between 1980 and 1991, he studied at a yeshiva.

=== Early career ===
Maoz was appointed Director of the Ministry of Interior by Natan Sharansky in 1999, and subsequently became director of the Ministry of Construction and Housing under minister Effi Eitam. He also served as the director-general of Yisrael BaAliyah.

=== Political career ===
Maoz became the leader of the Noam party after its establishment in 2019. He and Noam campaign on Israel's "Jewish identity", which Maoz and his party argue should be Orthodox-religious and socially conservative, against secularism, laicism, liberalism, feminism, and Reform Judaism. He advocates for social traditionalism, and has campaigned heavily against LGBT rights, calling for a ban on Pride parades in Jerusalem and the legalization of conversion therapy for gays. He is against women serving in the Israel Defense Forces, and has called for increased gender segregation of public events.

Prior to the 2021 Knesset elections, Maoz was placed sixth on the Religious Zionist Party list, and was elected to the Knesset as the party won six seats.

He was re-elected in the 2022 Knesset elections as part of the Religious Zionism Party, though the party split into three factions on 20 November 2022. An agreement signed on 27 November 2022 will appoint Maoz a deputy minister in the coalition under Benjamin Netanyahu. As part of the agreement, Maoz heads a new organization focused on Jewish identity, which will include control of Nativ, a body that administers immigration from former Soviet countries. Maoz has said he wishes to change Israel's Law of Return to exclude non-Jewish grandchildren of Jews, and recognize only Orthodox conversions to Judaism for migration. Maoz's appointment went into effect on 3 January 2023.

On 27 February 2023 Maoz announced his intention to resign as deputy minister, claiming the government did not intend on fulfilling Noam's coalition agreement with Likud. His resignation went into effect on 1 March. In May 2023, Maoz returned to his position as deputy minister in charge of the Jewish National Identity Authority. On 24 March 2025, Maoz resigned from the government for the second time.

In February 2026 Maoz sponsored a bill in the Knesset to grant the Chief Rabbinate full control over prayer at all parts of the Kotel (Western Wall), including Ezrat Yisrael, the egalitarian section of the Kotel. This drew harsh condemnation from progressive Jewish groups, as well as some Orthodox groups and rabbis.

Ahead of the 2026 Knesset elections, Maoz announced in July 2026 that Noam would rename itself "Noam BeYisrael" (Noam for Israel) and pursue a strategy of positioning itself as a "bridge" between the Haredi, religious-Zionist and traditional Jewish communities, aiming to broaden its base beyond its religious-Zionist core. He launched the party's campaign on 29 July 2026 under the slogan "Free to be Jewish" (Hebrew: חופשי להיות יהודי), rejecting claims that an independent run risked splitting right-wing votes and arguing instead that the party would help the national camp reach a 61-seat majority. On 20 July 2026, Tzvi Yisrael Tao convened dozens of rabbis for an election conference in support of the party. Alongside Maoz, activist Eliyahu Livman and Be'er Sheva deputy mayor Shimon Tvivol announced they would also run on the party's list. Maoz declined to commit to withdrawing the party from the race even if polling placed it below the electoral threshold. He lost his seat in the Knesset, as the party did not cross the threshold.

=== Personal life ===
Maoz lives in Jerusalem, is married, and has ten children.
