= Wajdi Sarhan =

Israeli commander and politician

- وجدي سرحان
- Military career
- Allegiance: Israel
- Branch: Israel Defense Forces
- Service years: 2006-2017
- Rank: Colonel
- Conflicts: 2006 Lebanon War

Wajdi Sarhan (Arabic: وجدي سرحان, Hebrew: וג'די סרחאן) is a reservist in the Israel Defense Forces and a politician, announcing in 2026 the establishment of the first Israeli-Druze political party Alliance of Brothers.

== Career ==
=== Military ===
In 2006, Sarhan was promoted to the rank of Lieutenant Colonel and appointed as commander of the Sword Battalion, who also led the battalion during the 2006 Lebanon War, including battles in Maroun al-Ras and Ravashin.

In 2007, he became deputy commander of the 769th Hiram Brigade, and then in 2009 was appointed as commander of the Dekel Battalion in Bahad 1. In 2011, Sarhan was promoted to the rank of colonel and appointed as the commander of the Alon Brigade. During his command, the brigade became an excellent infantry brigade in the reserve.

In 2014, Sarhan was appointed as the population management department in the Personnel Directorate, and he remained in this position until his retirement from the military in August 2017. In his view, many Arab Israelis saw serving in the IDF as a way to improve their lives. he promoted enlistment into the unit in an effort to "integrate minorities into the army". He believed that military service is "a great platform to connect the Muslim community to the state".

=== Entry into politics ===
“This time we are asking for everything. This time we are taking responsibility for our future, for our lands and for our family. For years we waited for others to take care of us, but today we understand that it depends only on us. It is ours — and it is our responsibility. And today, as one bloc and together, we are deciding to go inside in order to change from within and lead.”

— Wajdi Sarhan, ynet

In May 2026, Sarhan announced the establishment of the political party Alliance of Brothers, to represent the interests of the Druze minority in Israel. This party was created as a result of frustration from the Druze community for the lack of change and a desire for a more independent force politically in addressing the needs of the community. The party states that it was working on development for two years, and is the first independent Druze party launched in decades. Sarhan believed that while the Druze community carries the full responsibilities of Israeli citizenship, the community still faces restrictions such as the Kaminitz Law that limits construction in Druze areas along with the Nation-State Law that many Druze see as discriminatory. He had also previously pointed out that Golani Druze don't have the same rights to economic development that other Israelis have. While Druze have served in the Knesset before, they felt that they were bound to party discipline, and couldn't advocate for their community effectively. He also criticized the political-security decisions that had been made by the Israeli government, calling for real peace and security.

Sarhan's party platform outlines the following priorities:

1. Addressing the housing crisis in the Golan
2. Safety and security
3. Strengthening extra-curricular opportunities
4. Increasing budgets for villages

Sarhan did not submit a list.

During the 2026 Iran war, Sarhan appeared twice on Keshet 12 to discuss issues relating to the war, one of only a handful of Arab voices present in Israeli media during the war.
