= Evgeny Sova =

Israeli politician

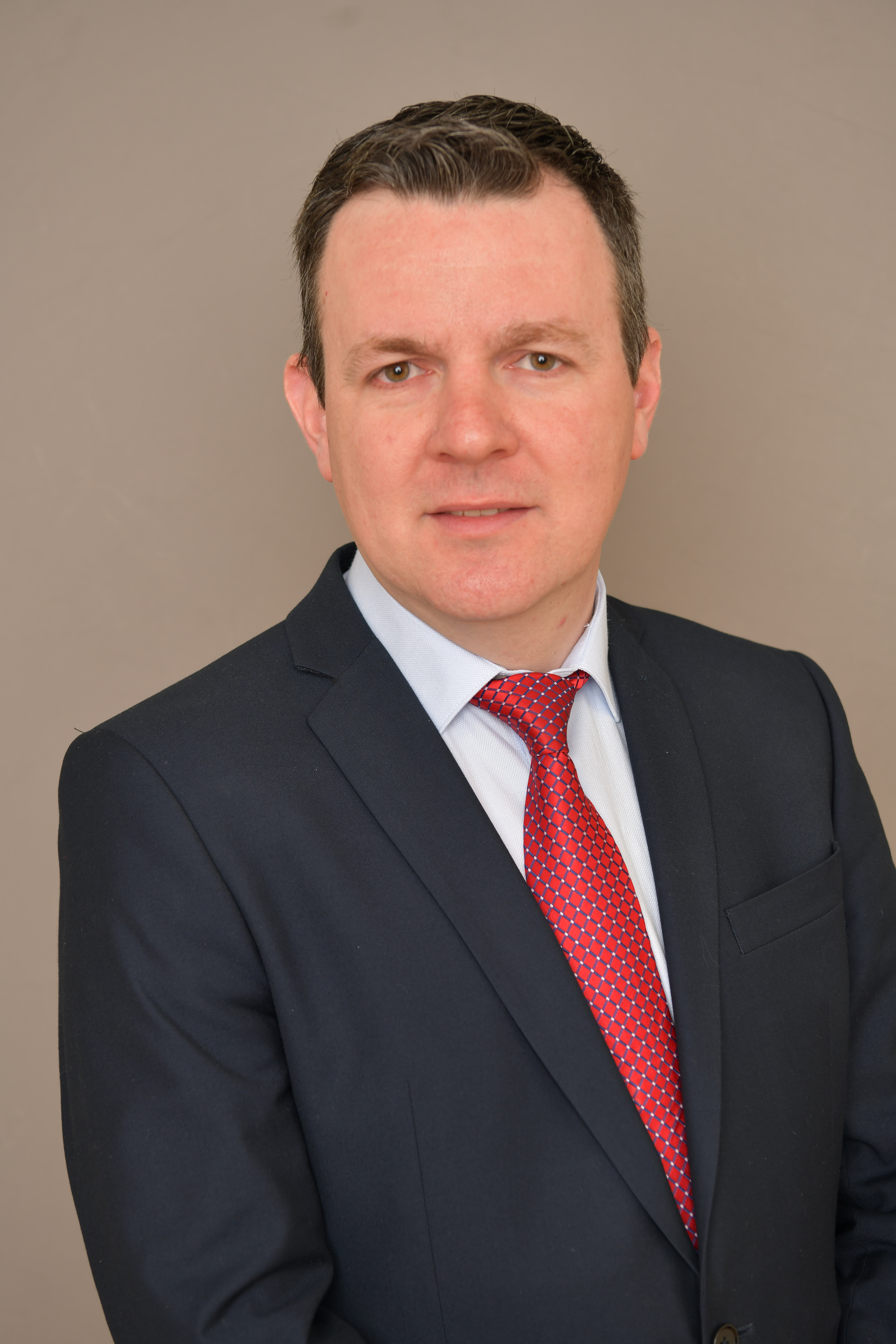
- Sova in 2021

Faction represented in the Knesset
- 2019–2026: Yisrael Beiteinu

Personal details
- Born: 29 August 1980 (age 46) Pervomaisk, Soviet Union

Evgeny Sova (Hebrew: יֶבְגֶנִי סוּבָה; born 29 August 1980) is an Israeli journalist, television presenter and politician who served as a member of the Knesset for Yisrael Beiteinu from 2019 until 2026.

== Biography ==
Born in Pervomaisk in the Ukrainian SSR of the Soviet Union, Sova emigrated to Israel in 1997 as part of the Jewish Agency's Selah Programme and studied for a BA in political science at Bar-Ilan University. He served in the Israel Defense Forces as an officer in the Soldiers' Complaints Commission."

In 2005 he joined the Russian-language Vesti newspaper as a reporter and researcher.

In 2006 he began his television career, initially at Channel 2 news before moving to the Russian-language Channel 9, where he served as the channel's political commentator from 2007 and hosted several daily current affairs programmes.

He later joined Israel Plus as a political commentator, before moving to RTVI in 2014, presenting the Week in Israel programme.

From 2017 until January 2019 he also hosted a daily current affairs programme on Kan REKA, the Russian-language radio station of the Israeli Public Broadcasting Corporation.

He also worked as the BBC Russian-language correspondent in Israel. In addition to his broadcasting work, Sova lectures in journalism at Ariel University.

Prior to the April 2019 Knesset elections he was placed third on the Yisrael Beiteinu list, and entered the Knesset as the party won five seats.

Sova is married with three children and lives in Petah Tikva.
