= Moshe Tur-Paz =

Israeli politician

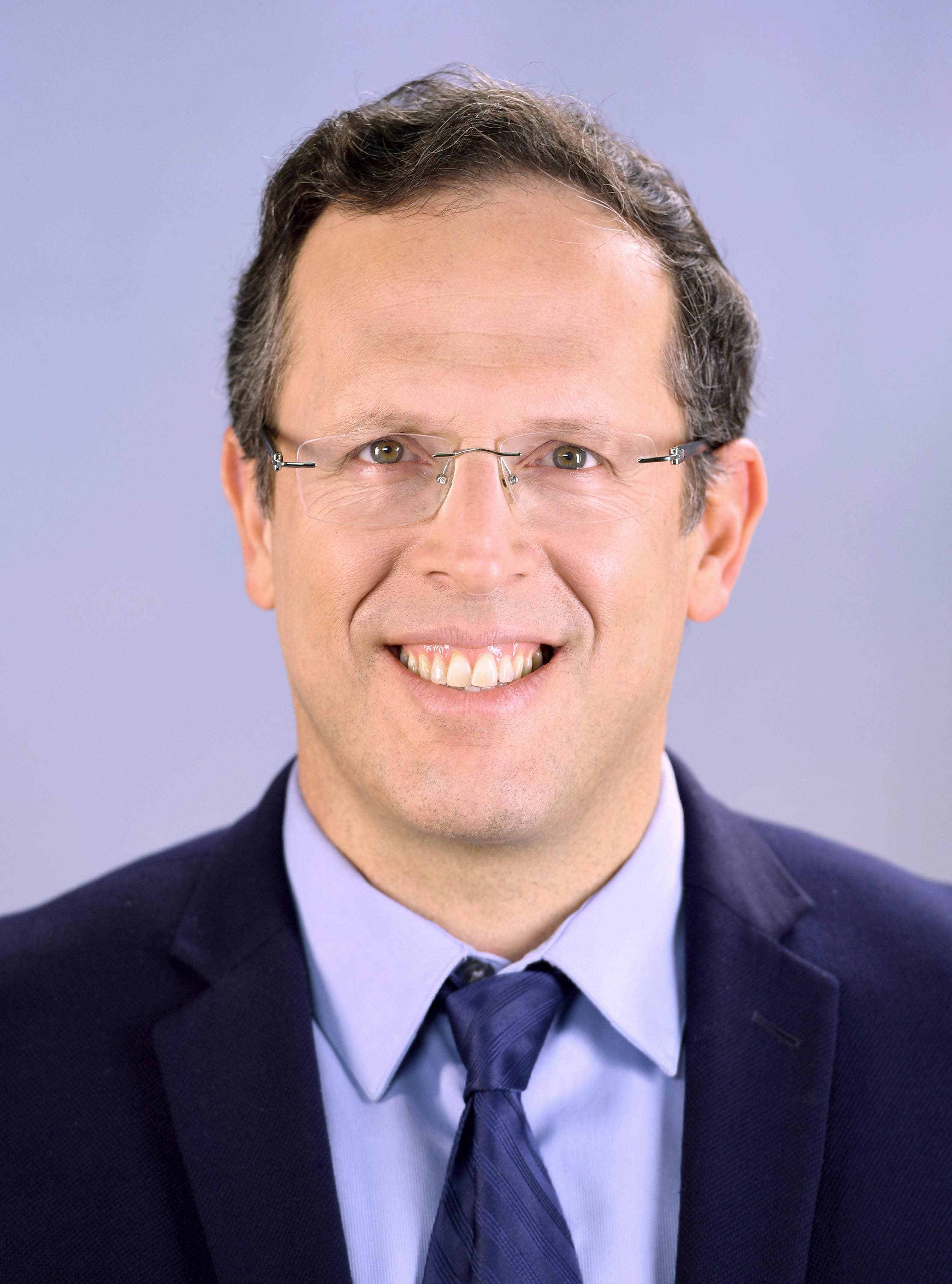
- Moshe Tur-Paz in 2021

Faction represented in the Knesset
- 2021: Yesh Atid
- 2021–2026: Yesh Atid

Personal details
- Born: 29 April 1972 (age 54) Philadelphia, Pennsylvania United States
- Education: Yeshivat Har Etzion; Neve Shmuel Yeshiva

Moshe Yehuda Tur-Paz (Hebrew: משה יהודה טור-פז; born 29 April 1972) is an Israeli politician. He served as a member of the Knesset for Yesh Atid from 2021 until 2026.

== Biography ==
Tur-Paz was born in Philadelphia in 1972. His parents were British immigrants to Israel in the 1950s, and were working in the United States for the Jewish Agency. The family returned to Israel the following year, and he grew up in Haifa and Jerusalem, as well as spending part of his childhood in the United Kingdom. He was educated at the Neve Shmuel Yeshiva and Yeshivat Har Etzion, and went on to earn a bachelor's degree in Jewish thought and the Bible and a master's degree in Jewish history at the Hebrew University of Jerusalem. After serving as deputy headmaster of the Pelech school, he managed the Shaked secondary school in Sde Eliyahu from 2007 to 2012. In 2012 he was appointed Director of Education of Jerusalem municipality, a role he held until 2017. He subsequently became director of the education network of the Religious Kibbutz Movement.

Tur-Paz lives in the Kfar Etzion settlement, and is married with five children.

== Political career ==
A member of Yesh Atid, he was placed forty-second on the Blue and White list for the April 2019 elections, in which it won 35 seats. He was given the same slot for the September 2019 and March 2020 elections. Although he failed to win a seat, he entered the Knesset in January 2021 as a replacement for former Blue and White MK Einav Kabla. He was placed twenty-first on the Yesh Atid list for the March 2021 elections, losing his seat as Yesh Atid won seventeen seats. However, in July 2021 he entered the Knesset after Equality Minister Meirav Cohen resigned her seat under the Norwegian law.

He established a separate education committee in November 2025, distinct from the Knesset's Knesset Committee on Education, Culture and Sports, as the Knesset committee was inactive following Shas members resignations from the committee.
