= Haredi Public =

HaTzibbur HaCharedi הציבור החרדי
- Leader: Moti Leitner
- Founded: July 2026
- Ideology: Modern Haredi interests; Haredi integration; Economic liberalism
- Political position: Right-wing
- Colours: Yellow
- Knesset: 0 / 120

Election symbol
- זך

Website
- hatzibur-haharedi.org/en

Haredi Public (Hebrew: הציבור החרדי, HaTzibbur HaCharedi) is an Israeli political party founded in July 2026 and headed by Beit Shemesh Deputy Mayor Moti Leitner. The party failed to pass the 3.25% electoral threshold, winning 0.2% of the vote.

== Background ==
Party chairman Moti Leitner previously founded and led the local Derech faction in the 2024 Beit Shemesh municipal elections, winning two seats on the city council and serving as deputy mayor.

== History ==
The movement was launched on 19 July 2026, initially demanding representation on the Knesset lists of Degel HaTorah and Shas under the slogan “No Haredi party without the Haredi public.” After talks with the established parties stalled, it decided to run independently.

Its official election campaign was launched on 23 August 2026 at an event in Beit Shemesh. The party submitted its electoral list to the Central Elections Committee on 8 September 2026.

The party won 0.2% of the vote and did not reach the 3.25% electoral threshold, keeping it out of the Knesset.

Leitner said after the election that the party's aggressive rhetoric was not needed. He also spoke of changing tactics if another election takes place; rather than another independent Knesset run, he would seek to run with Haredi parties, and if it is unsuccessful, with another right-wing party.

== Policies ==
The party has a more open stance on Haredi conscription in Israel than the other Haredi parties. Unlike the established Haredi parties Shas and United Torah Judaism, it has included women on its list ahead of the 2026 Israeli legislative election, including Nechumi Yaffe in the third slot of its electoral list and Ziva Glanz, an Olah from Passaic, New Jersey, in the fourth spot. If the party passes the electoral threshold, Yaffe and Glanz would become the first two Haredi women elected to the Knesset to represent a Haredi party.

The party presents itself as a moderate alternative to the established Haredi parties Shas and United Torah Judaism, advocating protection for full-time Torah scholars alongside meaningful military or national service for those who do not study full-time, introduction of core curriculum subjects, workforce participation, and greater national responsibility.

== Election results ==
=== Knesset ===
Election	Leader	Votes	%	Seats	+/−	Government
2026	Moti Leitner	10,604	0.19% (#15)	0 / 120	New	Extra-parliamentary
