= Harald Thau =

Austrian politician (born 1985)

Member of the National Council
- Incumbent
- Assumed office 24 October 2024
- Constituency: Lower Austria

Personal details
- Born: 2 July 1985 (age 40)
- Party: Freedom Party

Harald Thau (born 2 July 1985) is an Austrian politician of the Freedom Party serving as a member of the National Council since 2024. He has been a city councillor of Mödling since 2010.
