= Eveline Goodman-Thau =

Austrian rabbi

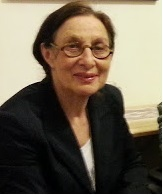

Personal life
- Born: 1934 (age 91–92) Vienna, Austria
- Relatives: Zvi Thau (brother)

Religious life
- Religion: Judaism
- Ordination: October 2000

Eveline Goodman-Thau (born 1934) was the first female rabbi in Austria, a job she began in 2001.

== Life ==
She was born in Vienna. Eveline survived the Holocaust by hiding with her family in the Netherlands. Her siblings are religious Zionist rabbi Zvi Thau and Gerda Elata-Alster, a former professor of Comparative Literature at Ben-Gurion University.

In 1996, she was named director of the Institute for Research on Dutch Jewry in Holland. In 1999, she was the founding director of the Herman Cohen Academy for European Jewish Studies in Buchen, Odenwald, Germany.

Eveline Goodman-Thau was privately ordained in Jerusalem in October 2000 by Orthodox rabbi Jonathan Chipman. She later led the liberal Jewish community in Vienna for one year, beginning in 2001.

== Personal life ==
Goodman-Thau is a Dutch citizen. She has five children with her husband, Moshe Goodman.

== See also ==
- Timeline of women rabbis
