= Har Hamor =

Religious Zionist yeshiva in Jerusalem

Coordinates: 31°45′51″N 35°10′14″E

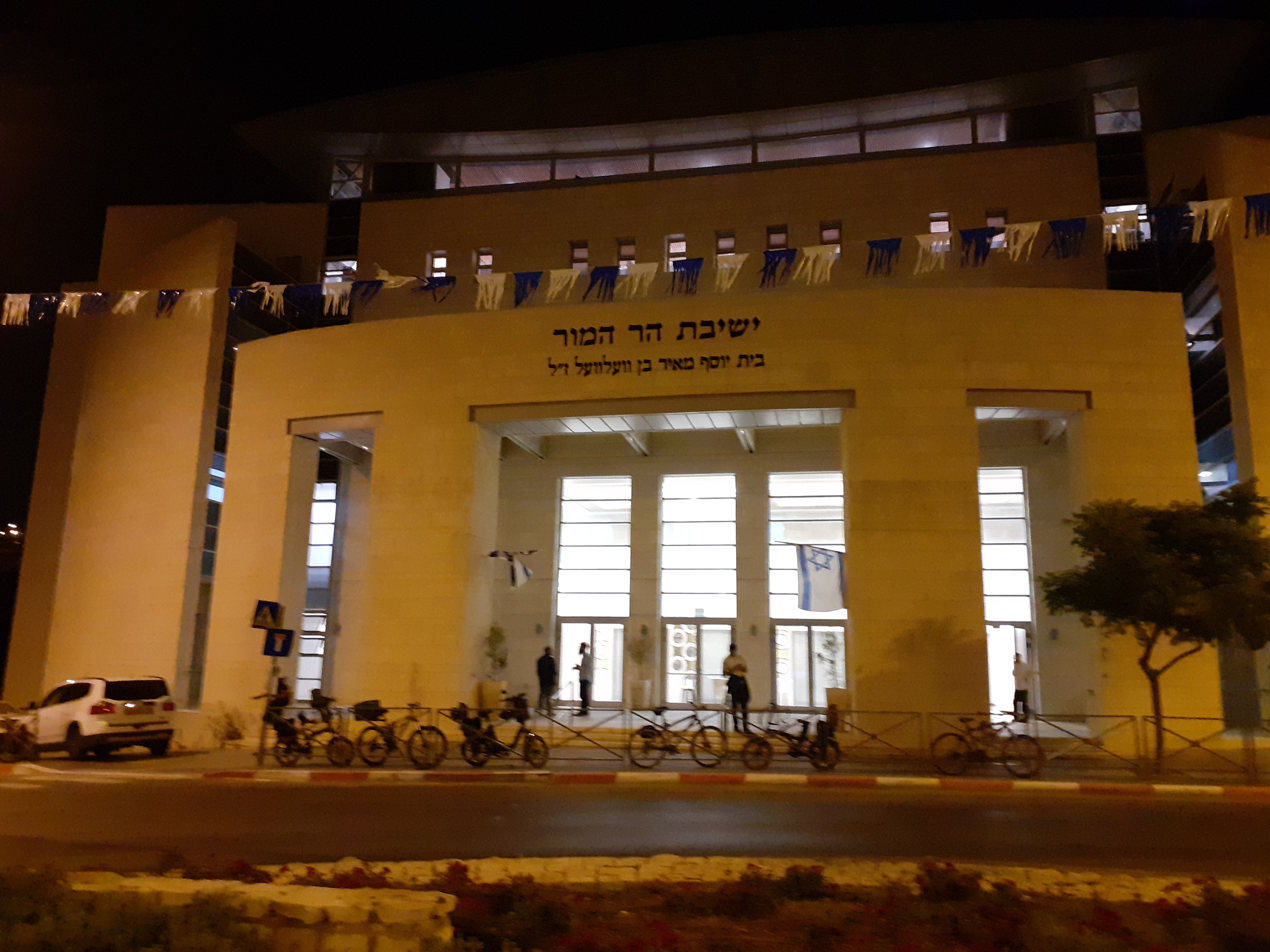
Entrance to the yeshiva

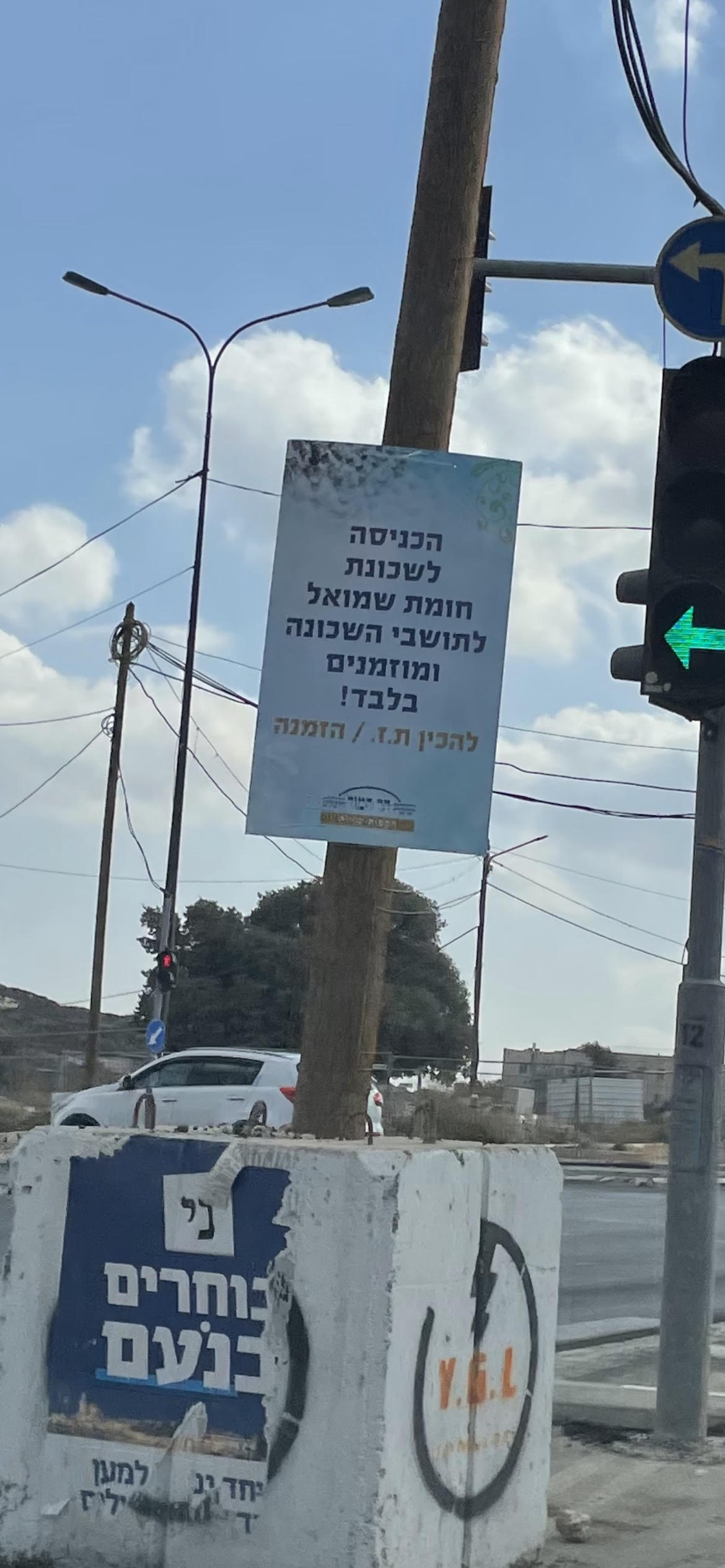
On the holiday of Sukkot, the Har Mor Yeshiva hung a sign at the entrance to the Har Homa neighborhood that says: "Entrance to the Homa Shmuel neighborhood is for residents of the neighborhood and invitees only. Prepare an ID card and an invitation." Following complaints from the residents of Jerusalem, the sign was removed by the municipality on October 6, 2023, in the afternoon by a municipality inspector

Yeshivat Har Hamor (Hebrew: ישיבת הר המור); is a Religious Zionist yeshiva in Har Homa, Jerusalem, founded in 1997 as an offshoot of Yeshivat Mercaz HaRav. The president of the yeshiva is Rabbi Zvi Thau, and the Rosh yeshiva - head of the yeshiva - is Rabbi Amiel Sternberg. There are around 850 students. Many of the students are married ("avrechim"), and the average student age is higher than at most Religious Zionist yeshivas.

The name means "mountain of myrrh", recalling this phrase in Song of Songs 4:6, which in the Jewish tradition refers to the Temple Mount. The word "Hamor" is also an acronym for "Hemshech [= continuation of] Mercaz HaRav".

== History ==
The Yeshiva was founded when a group of rabbis, led by Zvi Thau, broke off from Mercaz Harav. The broader cause of the separation was a disagreement between Thau and Rabbi Avraham Shapira, head of Mercaz HaRav, about methods of Torah education. The immediate cause was Rabbi Thau's opposition to the establishment of a teacher's college in the yeshiva. This was the first time a Religious Zionist Yeshiva had split.

Since the founding of the yeshiva, the twin brothers Rabbi Mordechai Sternberg and Rabbi Amiel Sternberg simultaneously held the position of Rosh yeshiva - heads of the yeshiva, until the passing of Rabbi Mordechai Sternberg in late 2022.

The yeshiva has been located at sites in several neighbourhoods in Jerusalem - Kiryat Menachem, then Bayit VeGan, and then, in 2008, to Kiryat HaYovel. The yeshiva moved to a newly built permanent building in the Har Homa neighbourhood in August 2017.

== Ideology ==
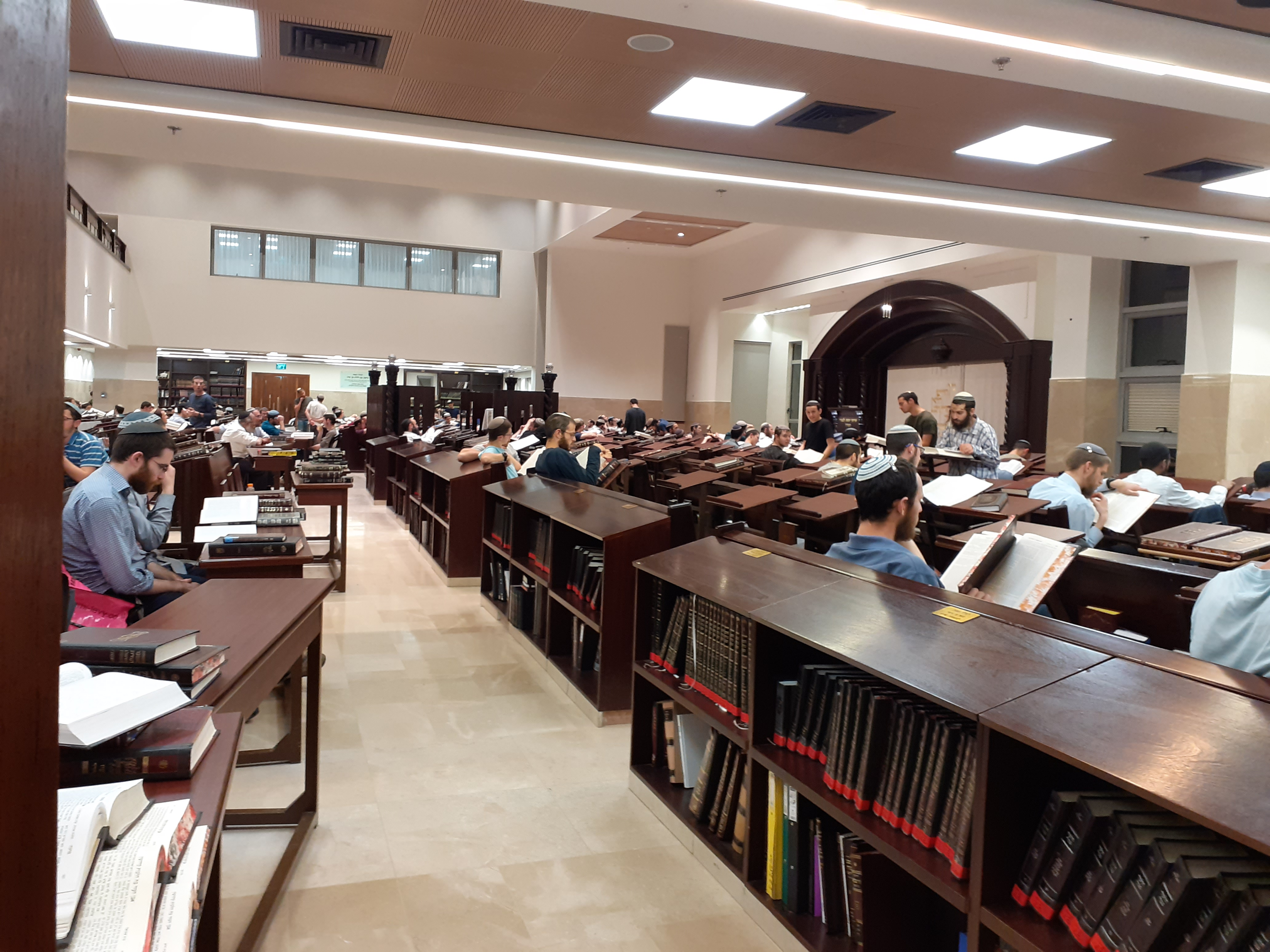
The beit midrash of the yeshiva

The yeshiva follows the teachings of Rabbi Abraham Isaac Kook and his son Rabbi Tzvi Yehuda Kook. It has a mamlachti ("statist") approach which sees special holiness in the institution of the State of Israel, which Rabbi Kook (the elder) termed "God's throne in the world". The yeshiva stands at the head of a number of institutions also connected to Thau, which together are known as "Yeshivot hakav" ("yeshivas that follow the line").

In addition to the study of Talmud with the traditional commentators (Rishonim and Achronim), the yeshiva emphasizes the study of Jewish thought (Machshava) according to the approach of Rabbi Kook.

Students usually serve in the Israeli army in a framework called "Hesder Mercaz", as in Yeshivat Mercaz HaRav.
