= Zvi Thau =

Israeli Orthodox rabbi (born 1938)

- צבי טאו
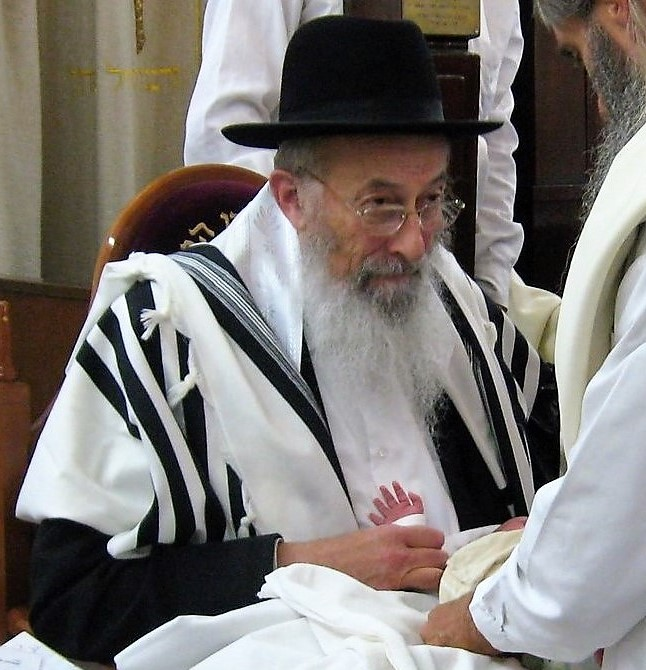
- Title: Rabbi Zvi Thau

Personal life
- Born: 1938 (age 87–88) Vienna, Federal State of Austria
- Children: 4

Religious life
- Religion: Judaism

Jewish leader
- Position: Rosh Yeshiva
- Yeshiva: Har Hamor
- Began: 1952
- Ended: 1982

Zvi Yisrael Thau (Hebrew: צבי ישראל טאו; born 1938) is an Israeli Orthodox rabbi, a disciple of Rabbi Zvi Yehuda Kook, and co-founder and president of Yeshivat Har Hamor in Jerusalem.

== Biography ==
Hans (Zvi Yisrael) Thau was born in Vienna to Galician Jewish parents. His father, Avraham Adolph Thau, was a banker, and his mother, Judith Yutah Meisels, was a chemist. After the annexation of Austria to Nazi Germany ("Anschluss"), the family left for the Netherlands, and during the Holocaust, they were hidden by a local family in Hilversum. They were saved, among other things, due to his mother's resourcefulness.

His sister Eveline related: "In June 1943, there was a large Aktion [round-up of Jews to be deported], and we were saved thanks to our mother, who was a chemist. She managed to disguise us as measles patients and hung a sign on the door: 'Beware. Contagious disease'."

After the war, Thau studied in a public school, where he was exposed to philosophy. At the age of 17, after his mother's death, he immigrated to Israel, despite his father's objections, due to his refusal to complete a matriculation certificate prior to immigration. His father and sister visited the United States during this period.

After making aliyah, Thau studied at Yeshivat HaDarom under Rabbi Yehuda Amital. He related that Rabbi Amital introduced him into the world of Torah and the teachings of Rabbi Abraham Isaac Kook. The following year, Thau studied at Mercaz HaRav in Jerusalem.

Thau's first wife, Chana, died in 2004. She was a pioneer of Torah study for women in the Orthodox community. At the age of 71, Thau married Batya Cohen, founder and clinical director of an outpatient clinic treating modern Orthodox and Haredi people with eating disorders.

Thau has three sons and a daughter. His eldest son, Rabbi Mordechai (Moti), heads the yeshiva high school "Sh^{e}lom Banayich" in Jerusalem. His son Rabbi Nehemiah is a lecturer in the yeshiva in Mitzpe Ramon. Thau has two older sisters: Dr. Gerda Elata-Alster, a former professor of Comparative Literature at Ben-Gurion University; and Dr. Eveline Goodman-Thau, a professor of Jewish religious and intellectual history, who served one year as a liberal rabbi in Vienna.

== Rabbinical career ==
From the 1960s, Thau held a position of influence at Yeshivat Mercaz HaRav. He is considered by many to be the leading disciple of Rabbi Zvi Yehuda Kook, the dean of Mercaz HaRav.

In 1997, Thau opposed the introduction of an academic framework – plans to integrate a teaching institute – into Mercaz HaRav. As a result, he, together with six senior lecturers and many students, left the yeshiva and established the Har Hamor yeshiva. (The Yeshiva's name is derived from a phrase in Song of Songs 4:6, meaning "mountain of myrrh", also, the name "HaMoR" is also a Hebrew acronym for "Successor to Mercaz HaRav".) While he is not involved in Har Hamor's day-to-day management, Thau is the ultimate authority on ideological matters.

While Thau's authority on matters of ideology and policy amongst those affiliated with the movement associated with the right flank of Dati Leumi Israeli Jewry has remained unquestioned for many years, Rabbi Amiel Sternberg, the current dean of the Har Hamor yeshiva, is credited with positing that Rabbi Thau was mistaken in defending Chaim Walder, a Haredi psychologist and best-selling author convicted in religious court of sexual misconduct; he did not immediately retract his comments after criticizing Rabbi and noted rabbinical judge Shmuel Eliyahu and meeting with him to "smooth things over".

== Views and opinions ==
Thau objects to the "Bible at Eye Level" (תנך בגובה עיניים) approach, which interprets Biblical narratives and personalities as real-life situations and real-life characters (see Yeshivat Har Etzion § Educational and religious philosophy).

With regard to religious soldiers ordered to evacuate a settlement, he ruled that explicit refusal was out of the question, but soldiers would need to make it clear to their commanding officers that they "were incapable" of carrying out such an order.

Thau is the ideological leader of the Noam party, a far-right religious Zionist party in Israel whose key issue is the promotion of heteronormative, anti-LGBTQ, and traditionalist policy. Leading up to the 2021 Israeli legislative election, he told followers that "these homosexuals, these perverts, are miserable people. We want the voice of truth and the voice of faith and the voice of Torah to sound, and for someone there to cry out all the time... someone who will not rest until this thing is off the agenda." His book, On Dealing with Postmodernism and Breaking Free from its Shackles, is the source of several police complaints against Thau for inciting violence against the LGBT community.

== Allegations of sexual assault and conspiracy ==
In 2022, a 38-year-old woman said that Thau had repeatedly assaulted her for many years, beginning when she was a minor. When her claims became public, a second woman came forward to speak with the police and media about an alleged assault 40 years prior. After the police opened an investigation, the first woman publicly claimed that Thau is also a descendant of Mengele, and a member of a Nazi group that is trying to harm the State of Israel. The police completed the investigation in June 2023, and the materials were turned over to the prosecutor's office for review.

== Published works ==
While Thau has never directly published books himself, some books, based on his lectures, were published with his direct involvement:

- Le-Emunat Iteinu – 16 volumes of lectures on faith and redemption
- Tzaddik Be-Emunato Yichye – on Torah study
- Solu Hamesila – on the struggle for the Land of Israel
- Neshama Le-Am Aleha – lectures given during the 2005 Israeli disengagement from Gaza
- Nosei Alumotav – on the value of agriculture
- Tzedakah Teromem Goy – on the value of the mitzvah of charity
- Hesed uMishpat Ashira – regarding love of God and accepting suffering with love
- On Dealing with Postmodernism and Breaking Free from its Shackles - postmodernism in society and how to respond
- Harimu Michshol MeDerech Ami – about the duty to reprove the issues of the generation
