= Opinion polling for the 2020 Israeli legislative election =

In the run up to the 2020 Israeli legislative election, various organisations carry out opinion polling to gauge voting intention in Israel during the term of the 22nd Knesset. This article lists the results of such polls.

The date range for these opinion polls is from the previous election, held on 17 September 2019, to the present day. The elections were held on 2 March 2020. No polls may be published from the end of the Friday before the election until the polling stations close on election day at 22:00.

Polls are listed in reverse chronological order, showing the most recent first and using the dates when the survey fieldwork was done, as opposed to the date of publication. Where the fieldwork dates are unknown, the date of publication is given instead. The highest figure in each polling survey is displayed with its background shaded in the leading party's colour. If a tie ensues, this is applied to the highest figures. When a poll has no information on a certain party, that party is instead marked by a dash (–).

== Seat projections ==
This section displays voting intention estimates referring to a hypothetical Knesset election. The figures listed are Knesset seat counts rather than percentages, unless otherwise stated.

=== Graphs ===
This graph shows the polling trends from the 17 September 2019 Israeli legislative election until election day using 4-poll moving average. Scenario polls are not included here.

For parties not crossing the electoral threshold (currently 3.25%) in any given poll, the number of seats is calculated as a percentage of the 120 total seats.

Local regression of polls conducted

=== Polls ===
Poll results are listed in the table below. Parties that fall below the electoral threshold are denoted by the percentage of votes that they received (N%) rather than the number of seats they would have gotten.

Legend

- Gov. — Sum of the current government parties: Likud, Shas, United Torah Judaism (UTJ), and Yamina.

61 seats are required for a majority in the Knesset.

Note: The composition of the current government does not necessarily determine the exact makeup of the post-election government.

Color key:

Exit poll

Date	Polling firm	Publisher	Blue & White	Likud	Joint List	Emet	Shas	Yisrael Beiteinu	UTJ	Yamina	Otzma	Gov.
Pre-election seats			33	32	13	10	9	8	7	7	–	55
2 Mar 2020	Election results		33	36	15	7	9	7	7	6	(0.42%)	58
2 Mar 2020	Kantar	Kan 11	33	36	15	6	9	6	8	7	–	60
2 Mar 2020	Midgam	Channel 12	33	37	14	7	9	6	7	7	–	60
2 Mar 2020	Camile Fuchs	Channel 13	32	37	14	6	9	8	8	6	–	60
28 Feb 2020	Election silence starting end of Friday before election day											
28 Feb 2020	Smith	Maariv	34	35	14	8	9	6	7	7	–	58
28 Feb 2020	Panel Project HaMidgam	Channel 13	33	33	15	9	8	7	7	8	(1.8%)	56
27–28 Feb 2020	Midgam	Channel 12	33	35	14	9	8	6	8	7	(1.5%)	58
27 Feb 2020	Panels Politics	Maariv & The Jerusalem Post	34	34	13	9	9	7	7	7	(2.1%)	57
27 Feb 2020	Maagar Mohot	Israel Hayom & i24 News	33	33	14	9	8	7	7	9	(2%)	57
27 Feb 2020	Kantar	Kan 11	34	35	14	8	8	6	8	7	(1.6%)	58
26 Feb 2020	Direct Polls	Arutz Sheva	33	35	13	9	9	6	8	7	(0.96%)	59
25 Feb 2020	Midgam	Walla!	34	34	13	9	8	7	8	7	(1.7%)	57
25 Feb 2020	Panels Politics	103fm	32	34	14	9	8	8	7	8	(2%)	57
24 Feb 2020	Kantar	Kan 11	33	34	14	10	8	7	7	7	(1.9%)	56
24 Feb 2020	Panel Project HaMidgam	Channel 13	32	33	14	10	8	8	7	8	(2.0%)	56
23 Feb 2020	Kantar	Kan 11	34	35	14	9	8	7	7	6	(1.3%)	56
23 Feb 2020	Midgam	Channel 12	33	34	13	10	8	7	8	7	(1.5%)	57
19–20 Feb 2020	Maagar Mohot	Israel Hayom & i24 News	36	33	13	8	8	7	7	8	(1%)	56
19–20 Feb 2020	Direct Polls	Arutz Sheva	31	33	14	10	9	7	8	8	(1.2%)	58
19 Feb 2020	Panels Politics	Maariv	36	32	14	8	9	8	7	7	(2.6%)	54
19 Feb 2020	Midgam	Channel 12	35	33	13	9	8	7	8	7	(1.6%)	56
17 Feb 2020	Panel Project HaMidgam	Channel 13	36	33	14	8	7	8	7	7	(1.9%)	54
16–17 Feb 2020	Midgam	Walla!	34	33	13	10	8	7	8	7	(2.5%)	56
13–14 Feb 2020	Panels Politics	103fm	35	32	14	8	8	7	8	8	(2.8%)	56
13 Feb 2020	Midgam	Channel 12	35	33	13	9	8	7	8	7	(2.2%)	56
12–13 Feb 2020	Maagar Mohot	Israel Hayom & i24 News	34	32	14	8	8	7	8	9	(1%)	57
12–13 Feb 2020	Smith	Maariv	34	33	14	9	9	7	7	7	(1.4%)	56
11–12 Feb 2020	Panels Politics	Makor Rishon	36	33	14	7	8	7	8	7	(2.6%)	56
7 Feb 2020	Panel Project HaMidgam	Channel 13	35	33	14	10	7	8	7	6	(1.5%)	53
6 Feb 2020	Direct Polls	Channel 20	33	34	13	10	8	7	8	7	(1%)	57
5–6 Feb 2020	Maagar Mohot	Israel Hayom & i24 News	36	34	13	8	8	6	7	8	(1%)	57
5 Feb 2020	Panels Politics	Maariv	36	33	13	8	7	7	8	8	(2.8%)	56
5 Feb 2020	Midgam	Walla!	34	32	13	9	8	8	8	8	(1.7%)	56
30 Jan 2020	Maagar Mochot	103fm	34	31	14	9	9	7	7	9	(1.5%)	56
29 Jan 2020	Panels Politics	Maariv	36	33	13	7	8	8	8	7	–	56
29 Jan 2020	Panel Project HaMidgam	Channel 13	35	34	12	10	7	8	7	7	(2.1%)	55
29 Jan 2020	Midgam	Channel 12	35	33	13	8	8	8	7	8	(2.2%)	56
29 Jan 2020	Kantar	Kan 11	34	33	14	8	8	8	8	7	(1.1%)	56
28 Jan 2020	Direct Polls	Israel Hayom	33	35	13	9	8	7	8	7	(1.32%)	58
28 Jan 2020	Announcement of Trump's Peace Plan											
22–23 Jan 2020	Panels Politics	Makor Rishon	35	32	14	8	8	7	8	8	(2.6%)	56
22–23 Jan 2020	Midgam	Walla!	35	32	13	9	8	8	7	8	(2.2%)	55
20–21 Jan 2020	Kantar	Kan 11	35	31	13	9	8	8	8	8	(1.93%)	55
19 Jan 2020	Direct Polls	Channel 13	34	32	13	10	8	7	8	8	(1.1%)	56
16 Jan 2020	Maagar Mochot	103fm	34	30	14	10	8	8	7	9	(1.0%)	54
16 Jan 2020	Midgam	Channel 12	34	32	13	8	8	8	7	10	(2.1%)	57
16 Jan 2020	Panel Project HaMidgam	Channel 13	34	31	14	9	6	8	7	7	4	51
16 Jan 2020	Kantar	Kan 11	36	31	13	9	9	7	8	7	(2.2%)	55
16 Jan 2020 (midnight)	Deadline to submit the candidate lists											
15 Jan 2020	Yamina alliance reestablished, United Jewish Home dissolves											
15 Jan 2020	Green Party withdrawal											

Date	Polling firm	Publisher	Blue & White	Likud	Joint List	Emet	Shas	Yisrael Beiteinu	UTJ	New Right	NU	UJH	Green	Gov.
Current seats			33	32	13	10	9	8	7	5		2	1	55
14 Jan 2020	Direct Polls	Arutz Sheva	34	32	13	10	8	8	8	7		(2.4%)	(2.3%)	55
14 Jan 2020 (noon)	Beginning of registration for candidate lists													
14 Jan 2020	New Right and National Union merger													
13 Jan 2020	Midgam	Channel 12	34	31	13	9	8	7	7	6	5		(0.4%)	57
13 Jan 2020	Midgam	Channel 12	34	32	13	9	8	7	7	10			(0.4%)	57
13 Jan 2020	Midgam	Channel 12	34	32	13	9	8	7	7	6		4	(0.4%)	57
13 Jan 2020	Labor-Gesher and Meretz merger, Democratic Union dissolves													

Date	Polling firm	Publisher	Blue & White	Likud	Joint List	Shas	Yisrael Beiteinu	UTJ	Labor- Gesher	Dem. Union	New Right	NU	UJH		Green	Gov.
Date	Polling firm	Publisher	Blue & White	Likud	Joint List	Shas	Yisrael Beiteinu	UTJ	Labor- Gesher	Dem. Union	New Right	NU	JH	Otzma	Green	Gov.
Current seats			33	32	13	9	8	7	6	4	3	2	2		1	55
9 Jan 2020	Midgam	Arutz Sheva	34	32	13	8	7	7	5	4	6	4			–	57
9 Jan 2020	Midgam	Arutz Sheva	34	32	13	8	7	8	5	4	9		(2.7%)		–	57
8–9 Jan 2020	Maagar Mohot	Israel Hayom	34	30	15	7	7	8	5	5	4	(1%)	5		(0.2%)	54
8–9 Jan 2020	Maagar Mohot	Israel Hayom	34	29	14	7	7	8	5	5	11				–	55
8–9 Jan 2020	Maagar Mohot	Israel Hayom	33	29	14	7	7	7	5	5	5	8			–	56
8–9 Jan 2020	Maagar Mohot	Israel Hayom	33	30	13	7	7	7	11		6	(1%)	6		–	56
8–9 Jan 2020	Maagar Mohot	Israel Hayom	39 (Note: Merger of Blue and White, Labor-Gesher and the Democratic Union)	31	14	7	11	7			6	(1%)	5		–	56
8–9 Jan 2020	Panels Politics	Makor Rishon	35	31	14	8	8	8	5	(2.4%)	7	–	4		–	58
8–9 Jan 2020	Panels Politics	Makor Rishon	35	31	14	7	8	7	5	(2.4%)	7	6			–	58
8–9 Jan 2020	Panels Politics	Makor Rishon	35	31	14	8	8	7	5	(2.4%)	8		4		–	58
8–9 Jan 2020	Panels Politics	Makor Rishon	35	33	14	8	8	7	5	(2.4%)	10				–	58
8–9 Jan 2020	Panels Politics	Makor Rishon	35	32	14	8	8	8	5	(2.4%)	10			(2.1%)	–	58
8 Jan 2020	Midgam	Walla!	35	33	13	8	8	8	5	4	6	(1.1%)	(2.8%)		(0.2%)	55
8 Jan 2020	Midgam	Walla!	34	32	13	8	8	8	9		8				–	56
7 Jan 2020	Meretz and Democratic Choice agree to run together as the Democratic Union list															
2 Jan 2020	KANTAR	Kan 11	35	33	13	7	7	8	6	5	6	(3%)			–	54
2 Jan 2020	Midgam	Channel 12	35	33	13	8	8	8	5	4 (Note: Meretz only (thus without the Israel Democratic Party))	6	(0.9%)	(2.6%)		(0.0%)	55
2 Jan 2020	Midgam	Channel 12	34	32	13	8	7	7	5	4 (Note: Meretz and the Green Party only (thus without the Israel Democratic Party))	6	4			(Note: Within the Democratic Union)	57
2 Jan 2020	Panel Project HaMidgam	Channel 13	36	34	13	7	6	7	5	4	8	(2.9%)			–	56
2 Jan 2020	Panel Project HaMidgam	Channel 13	35	33	13	7	7	7	10		8	–			–	55
1 Jan 2020	Panels Politics	Maariv	36	30	13	8	8	7	5	(2.9%)	6	7			–	58
29 Dec 2019	Midgam	Channel 12	34	32	13	8	8	7	5	4	5	4			–	56
26 Dec 2019	Likud reelects Benjamin Netanyahu as its leader															
20 Dec 2019	The Jewish Home and Otzma Yehudit agree to run together on a list called the United Jewish Home															
19 Dec 2019	Smith	103fm	35	32	13	8	7	7	5	4	5	4			–	56
19 Dec 2019	Stav Shaffir announces independent run of the Green Party															

Date	Polling firm	Publisher	Blue & White	Likud	Joint List	Shas	Yisrael Beiteinu	UTJ	Labor- Gesher	Dem. Union	JH–NU	New Right	Otzma Yehudit	Gov.
Current seats			33	32	13	9	8	7	6	5	4	3	–	55
18 Dec 2019	Panels Politics	Makor Rishon	38	34	14	8	7	7	5	(2.1%)	(2.7%)	7	(1.6%)	56
15 Dec 2019	Kantar	Kan 11	35	31	13	9	8	7	6	5	–	6	–	53
12 Dec 2019	Smith	Maariv	35	33	12	8	7	7	5	4	4 (Note: Within the Union of Right-Wing Parties)	5		57
12 Dec 2019	Maagar Mochot	Israel Hayom	37	31	14	8	8	7	6	4	(2%)	5	(1%)	51
12 Dec 2019	Midgam	Channel 12	35	32	13	8	8	8	5	5	(2.8%)	6	(1.3%)	54
12 Dec 2019	The Knesset is dissolved													
10 Dec 2019	Panel Project HaMidgam	Channel 13	37	33	13	6	8	7	5	5	–	6	–	52
9–10 Dec 2019	Midgam	Walla!	35	33	13	8	8	8	5	4	(2.1%)	6	(1.3%)	55
8 Dec 2019	Kantar	Kan Radio	35	34	13	8	7	8	5	4	(2.4%)	6	(1.9%)	56
5 Dec 2019	Midgam	Channel 12	34	33	13	8	8	8	5	5	(2.2%)	6	(1.9%)	55
5 Dec 2019	Maagar Mochot	103fm	34	32	12	8	8	8	4	4	4	6	–	58
28 Nov 2019	Maagar Mochot	Israel Hayom	35	33	13	9	8	8	4	4	(2%)	6	(1%)	56
28 Nov 2019	Maagar Mochot	103fm	35	33	13	9	8	8	4	4	–	6	–	56
26–27 Nov 2019	Smith	Maariv	35	33	13	8	8	7	5	5	–	6	–	54
26 Nov 2019	Midgam	Channel 12	34	33	13	8	9	8	5	4	(2.3%)	6	(1.2%)	55
25–26 Nov 2019	Midgam	Walla!	34	33	13	9	8	7	5	4	(2.3%)	7	(1.2%)	56
25 Nov 2019	Panels Politics	Channel 12	37	30	12	8	7	7	5	4	4	6	–	55
22 Nov 2019	Panel Project HaMidgam/Statnet	Channel 13	36	33	13	6	8	6	4	4	4	6	–	55
21–22 Nov 2019	Maagar Mochot	Israel Hayom	34	33	13	8	7	8	4	6	7		(2%)	56
21 Nov 2019	Midgam	Channel 12	33	33	13	8	9	7	5	5	7		–	55
21 Nov 2019	Kantar	Kan 11	33	33	12	7	8	8	5	5	4	5	–	57
21 Nov 2019	Attorney General indicts incumbent PM Benjamin Netanyahu on corruption charges													
15 Nov 2019	Maagar Mochot	Israel Hayom	33	31	13	10	9	7	6	6	5		–	53
10 Nov 2019	Panel Project HaMidgam	Channel 13	35	34	13	6	9	6	5	4	4	4	–	54
31 Oct 2019	Maagar Mochot	103fm	34	33	12	9	8	6	7	5	6		–	54
22 Oct 2019	Panel Project HaMidgam	Channel 13	34	33	13	7	8	7	5	4	5	4	–	56
10 Oct 2019	Yamina splits into two factions													

Date	Polling firm	Publisher	Blue & White	Likud	Joint List	Shas	Yisrael Beiteinu	UTJ	Yamina	Labor- Gesher	Dem. Union	Otzma Yehudit	Gov.
3–6 Oct 2019	Midgam	Walla!	33	33	13	9	7	7	7	6	5	–	56
17 Sep 2019	Election results		33	32	13	9	8	7	7	6	5	(1.88%)	55

==== Scenarios ====
Gideon Sa'ar founds a new party

Date	Polling firm	Publisher	Blue & White	Likud	Sa'ar	Joint List	Shas	Yisrael Beiteinu	UTJ	Labor- Gesher	Dem. Union	URWP	New Right	Gov.
Current seats			33	32		13	9	8	7	6	5	4	3	55
1 Jan 2020	Panels Politics	Maariv	34	28	6	13	8	7	7	4	–	7	6	62

Gideon Sa'ar leading Likud

Date	Polling firm	Publisher	Blue & White	Likud	Joint List	Shas	Yisrael Beiteinu	UTJ	Labor- Gesher	Dem. Union	JH–NU	New Right	Otzma	Gov.
Current seats			33	32	13	9	8	7	6	5	4	3	–	55
19 Dec 2019	Smith	103fm	33	30	13	9	6	7	5	4	5	8		59
18 Dec 2019	Panels Politics	Makor Rishon	34	30	14	8	7	8	5	(2.6%)	4	10	(2%)	60
15 Dec 2019	Kantar	Kan 11	34	27	13	10	7	7	5	5	4	8	–	56
12 Dec 2019	Maagar Mochot	Israel Hayom	33	31	15	11	7	7	5	4	(2%)	7	(2%)	56
12 Dec 2019	Midgam	Channel 12	35	26	13	8	8	7	5	5	4	9	(2.1%)	54
10 Dec 2019	Panel Project HaMidgam	Channel 13	35	29	13	7	8	7	4	5	5	7	–	55
8 Dec 2019	Kantar	Kan 11	33	32	13	9	8	8	5	4	–	8	–	57
28 Nov 2019	Maagar Mochot	103fm	33	28	14	11	9	9	4	–	–	12	–	60
26–27 Nov 2019	Smith	Maariv	35	31	13	8	7	7	5	4	4	6	–	56
26 Nov 2019	Midgam	Channel 12	35	26	13	10	9	8	6	4	(2.9%)	9	(2.2%)	53
3–6 Oct 2019	Midgam	Walla!	33	26	13	10	7	8	6	5	12		–	56

== Prime minister ==
Due to the political deadlock which resulted after the previous election, Shas chairman and Interior Minister Aryeh Deri suggested direct elections for prime minister. Some opinion pollsters have asked voters which party leader they would prefer as prime minister. Their responses are given as percentages in the tables below.

Netanyahu vs Gantz

Date	Polling firm	Publisher	Netanyahu	Gantz	Neither	Don't Know
28 Feb 2020	Panel Project HaMidgam	Channel 13	45	35	13	7
27–28 Feb 2020	Midgam	Channel 12	44	32	–	–
27 Feb 2020	Panels Politics	Maariv & The Jerusalem Post	45	36	13	7
27 Feb 2020	Maagar Mohot	Israel Hayom & i24 News	49	35	–	16
27 Feb 2020	Kantar	Kan 11	45	34	–	21
25 Feb 2020	Panels Politics	103fm	44	35	11	10
24 Feb 2020	Kantar	Kan 11	44	34	–	22
24 Feb 2020	Panel Project HaMidgam	Channel 13	44	30	19	7
23 Feb 2020	Midgam	Channel 12	43	33	18	6
19–20 Feb 2020	Maagar Mohot	Israel Hayom & i24 News	45	35	–	20
19 Feb 2020	Panels Politics	Maariv	43	39	–	18
19 Feb 2020	Midgam	Channel 12	42	34	18	6
17 Feb 2020	Panel Project HaMidgam	Channel 13	45	33	16	6
16–17 Feb 2020	Midgam	Walla!	43	35	16	6
13–14 Feb 2020	Panels Politics	103fm	43	40	–	17
13 Feb 2020	Midgam	Channel 12	42	36	17	5
12–13 Feb 2020	Maagar Mohot	Israel Hayom & i24 News	47	35	–	18
12–13 Feb 2020	Smith	Maariv	49	40	–	11
7 Feb 2020	Panel Project HaMidgam	Channel 13	44	32	16	8
5–6 Feb 2020	Maagar Mohot	Israel Hayom & i24 News	47	39	–	14
29 Jan 2020	Panel Project HaMidgam	Channel 13	43	33	–	24
29 Jan 2020	Midgam	Channel 12	41	37	16	6
16 Jan 2020	Panel Project HaMidgam	Channel 13	40	36	17	7
16 Jan 2020	Midgam	Channel 12	40	38	16	6
16 Jan 2020	Kantar	Kan 11	41	42	–	17
13 Jan 2020	Midgam	Channel 12	39	39	16	6
10 Jan 2020	Maagar Mohot	Israel Hayom	43	38	–	19
2 Jan 2020	Direct Polls	Channel 13	48.5	45.9	5.0	0.6
2 Jan 2020	Panel Project HaMidgam	Channel 13	41	33	13	12
2 Jan 2020	Midgam	Channel 12	40	39	15	6
1 Jan 2020	Panels Politics	Maariv	41	40	–	19
29 Dec 2019	Direct Polls	Channel 13	47.5	45.0	5.3	2.1
29 Dec 2019	Midgam	Channel 12	40	38	16	6
12 Dec 2019	Maagar Mochot	Israel Hayom	42	40	–	18
12 Dec 2019	Midgam	Channel 12	38	37	19	6
9–10 Dec 2019	Midgam	Walla!	37	38	16	9
8 Dec 2019	Kantar	Kan Radio	41	38	21	–
5 Dec 2019	Midgam	Channel 12	39	37	17	7
28 Nov 2019	Maagar Mochot	Israel Hayom	45	39	–	16
26 Nov 2019	Midgam	Channel 12	40	39	14	7
21–22 Nov 2019	Maagar Mochot	Israel Hayom	44	37	–	19
15 Nov 2019	Maagar Mochot	Israel Hayom	43	41	–	16
11 Nov 2019	Midgam	Army Radio	44	39	–	–
10 Nov 2019	Panel Project HaMidgam	Channel 13	40	37	–	23
5 Nov 2019	Midgam	Channel 12	40	36	24	

Sa'ar vs Gantz

Date	Polling firm	Publisher	Sa'ar	Gantz	Neither	Don't Know
12 Dec 2019	Maagar Mochot	Israel Hayom	31	36	–	33
12 Dec 2019	Midgam	Channel 12	22	36	30	12
8 Dec 2019	Kantar	Kan Radio	28	36	36	–
5 Dec 2019	Midgam	Channel 12	19	36	31	14
26 Nov 2019	Midgam	Channel 12	23	40	24	13

== Coalition ==
Some opinion pollsters have asked voters which coalition they would prefer. The tables below list their responses as percentages.

Minority government backed by the Joint List

Date	Polling firm	Publisher	Support	Oppose	Don't Know
16–17 Feb 2020	Midgam	Walla!	28	54 (Note: Prefer a fourth consecutive snap election.)	18
13 Feb 2020	Midgam	Channel 12	25	56	19
5–6 Feb 2020	Maagar Mohot	Israel Hayom & i24 News	29	54	17
11 Nov 2019	Midgam	Army Radio	34	59	–

General

Date	Polling firm	Publisher	National unity government			Right	Left	Don't Know
Date	Polling firm	Publisher	Likud-B&W only	w/ right-wing block	w/ Yisrael Beiteinu	Right	Left	Don't Know
12–13 Feb 2020	Maagar Mohot	Israel Hayom & i24 News	19	17	–	30	22	12
5–6 Feb 2020	Maagar Mohot	Israel Hayom & i24 News	17	17	–	30	23	13
5 Feb 2020	Panels Politics	Maariv	26	–	16	23	19	16
12 Dec 2019	Maagar Mochot	Israel Hayom	30	19	–	20	15	16
21 Nov 2019	Kantar	Kan 11	40			24	15	–
15 Nov 2019	Maagar Mochot	Israel Hayom	–	–	40	28	17	15

National unity government headed by Benjamin Netanyahu

Date	Polling firm	Publisher	Support	Oppose	Don't Know
13 Feb 2020	Midgam	Channel 12	50	25	25
3–6 Oct 2019	Midgam	Walla!	42	50	8

National unity government headed by Benny Gantz

Date	Polling firm	Publisher	Support	Oppose	Don't Know
13 Feb 2020	Midgam	Channel 12	52	27	21

National unity government

Date	Polling firm	Publisher	Support	Oppose	Don't Know
5 Feb 2020	Midgam	Walla!	52	26	22

Government headed by Benny Gantz

Date	Polling firm	Publisher	National unity government				Center-left & Yisrael Beiteinu	Other
Date	Polling firm	Publisher	with Netanyahu		without Netanyahu		Center-left & Yisrael Beiteinu	Other
Date	Polling firm	Publisher	with Haredim	without Haredim		with Haredim	Center-left & Yisrael Beiteinu	Other
9 Nov 2019	Midgam	Channel 12	29.1	17.9	20.3	3.2	19	10.5
