= Change bloc =

Israeli political coalition

The change bloc (Hebrew: גוש השינוי, romanized: Gush HaShinui), also called the anti-Netanyahu bloc, refers to an informal coalition of parties in Israeli politics opposed to the national camp. This group was particularly prominent during the 2018–2022 Israeli political crisis when this bloc competed with the national camp for government formation. The parties in the change bloc are ideologically diverse, which in the 36th government included the Arab religious Ra'am, the right-wing Yamina, the centrist Yesh Atid, and the left-wing Meretz.

== History ==
=== Early discussions ===
Following the 2013 Israeli legislative election, there were discussions of potentially creating a "preventive bloc" that would exclude Likud Yisrael Beiteinu from government, with Labour chairwoman Shelly Yachimovich saying she had made contacts with the aim of forming a centre-left coalition. However, Yesh Atid leader Yair Lapid rejected this idea and instead announced that "we must work together" by forming the 33rd government with Netanyahu.

In the lead-up of the 2015 Israeli legislative election, Labour and Meretz signed a surplus-vote agreement. Labor then merged with Hatnua to form the Zionist Union invalidating the agreement. The Zionist Union indicated that it would sign an agreement with Yesh Atid if Meretz and the Joint List signed one in turn. This fell through when Balad threatened to leave the Joint List if it decided to sign an agreement with a Zionist party like Meretz. In the end, Zionist Union and Meretz signed a new agreement leaving Yesh Atid and Joint List without one.

=== 2018–2022 political crisis ===
During the 2018–2022 Israeli political crisis, the change bloc competed with the national camp in order to form a majority government. Following the April 2019 Israeli legislative election, Blue and White became the largest party in this change bloc, but party leader Benny Gantz conceded as he was unable to form a governing coalition. As Netanyahu was also unable to form a government, a new election was called worsening the political crisis.

After the September 2019 Israeli legislative election, there was still no clear path to government formation, although Gantz strongly wanted to avoid a third election. Netanyahu similarly did not want a third election, and called for a broad unity government, although Gantz conditioned a unity government on excluding religious right-wing parties and having himself as prime minister. He also criticized Netanyahu for forcing the national camp remain as a single unit in any negotiations. Besides a unity government, Gantz also tried to consolidate the change bloc by meeting with Meretz and promised to include Yisrael Beiteinu in any coalition. Gantz was later given the mandate for government formation, but could not form a government and returned the mandate, leading to a third election.

Following the 2020 Israeli legislative election, the bloc again could not form a government and Gantz promised not to sit in coalition with Netanyahu. At the same time, the bloc could not rely on external support from the Joint List for a minority government due to internal opposition from some bloc members. Since the beginning of the political crisis, the change bloc was led by the Blue and White alliance, where Gantz was "the first candidate to pose a real threat to Netanyahu's rule in a decade". However, this alliance fractured as it became internally divided over whether to join in a unity government with Likud to address the worsening COVID-19 pandemic in Israel. Gantz's willingness to negotiate for the formation of the 35th government became a "setback for the center-left bloc".

The change bloc was revitalized following the 2021 Israeli legislative election when Yesh Atid leader Yair Lapid negotiated with other parties interested in unseating Netanyahu. These negotiations also included Yamina leader Naftali Bennett, as well as Ra'am leader Mansour Abbas. These efforts were complicated by the 2021 Israel–Palestine crisis, with Bennett unwilling to continue talks as part of the change bloc at first, but later reversing stance and resumed talks. Eventually, all eight negotiating parties signed coalition agreements, with the composition of the change bloc as: Yesh Atid, Blue and White, Yisrael Beiteinu, New Hope, Labor, Meretz, Yamina, and Ra'am.

=== 2026 election ===
The 2026 Israeli legislative election saw several politicians previously affiliated with the change bloc switch, merge, or start parties. Following the election, the following parties secured seats in the 26th Knesset: Yashar, Together (Yesh Atid & Bennett 2026), The Democrats and Yisrael Beiteinu. Although this incarnation of the change bloc was only able to achieve 48 seats, Ra'am and the Joint List recommended Gadi Eisenkot of Yashar to form the next government, giving him 67 mandates. On 8 November 2026, Isaac Herzog gave the responsibility of forming the thirty-eighth government of Israel to Eisenkot, giving him four weeks to form it, while Matan Kahana of Yashar was elected as Knesset speaker on 17 November.

== Composition ==
	April 2019	September 2019	2020	2021	2022	2026
Surplus-vote agreements	Meretz and Labor	Democratic Union and Labor-Gesher; Blue and White and Yisrael Beiteinu	Blue & White and Labor-Gesher-Meretz	Yesh Atid and Yisrael Beiteinu; Blue & White and New Economic Party; Yamina and New Hope; Labor and Meretz	Labor and Meretz; National Unity Party and Yesh Atid	Together and Yisrael Beiteinu; Yashar and The Democrats
Recommendations	For Benny Gantz: Blue & White; Labor; Meretz	For Benny Gantz: Blue & White; Joint List (Note: excluding Balad); Labor-Gesher; Democratic Union	For Benny Gantz: Blue & White; Joint List; Yisrael Beiteinu; Labor-Gesher-Meretz (Note: excluding Gesher)	For Yair Lapid: Yesh Atid; Blue & White; Labor; Yisrael Beiteinu; Meretz; For Naftali Bennett: Yamina; Other: New Hope (Note: New Hope expressed its support for a rotation government between Bennett and Lapid instead of endorsing a canidate.)	For Yair Lapid: Yesh Atid; Labor	For Gadi Eisenkot: Yashar; Together; Joint List; The Democrats; Ra'am; Yisrael Beiteinu

== Analysis ==
During the campaign season for the 2022 Israeli legislative election, an analysis from the Friedrich Naumann Foundation stated that the presence of the national camp and change bloc has led to Israel becoming a "two-bloc system" where "no party is independent of bloc affiliation" and that "the two blocs solidified" with very little shift between blocs. It argues that this bloc formation would lead to the "legitimization of all political actors" with campaigns focused on attacking the opposite bloc's most extreme members. There was also criticism that despite the bloc calling for change, there was very little change during the 36th government on addressing the Israeli–Palestinian conflict because of the ideological diversity of the coalition.

== See also ==
- Bennett–Lapid alliance
