= Opinion polling for the September 2019 Israeli legislative election =

Polling for the 17 September 2019 Israeli legislative election began on 26 May 2019.

== Seat projections ==
=== Graphs ===
These graphs show the polling trends from the time Knesset dissolved until the election day. No polls may be published from the end of Friday before the election until the polling stations closing on election day at 22:00.

If more than one poll was conducted on the same day, the graphs show the average of the polls for that date.

=== Polls ===
Poll results are listed in the table below in reverse chronological order, showing the most recent first. The highest figure in each survey is displayed in bold and the background shaded in the leading party's colour. In the instance that there is a tie, then both figures are shaded. Parties that fall below the threshold are denoted by the percentage of votes that they received (N%), instead of the seats they would have gotten. When a poll has no information on a certain party, that party is instead marked by a dash (–).

Color key:

Exit poll

Date	Polling firm	Publisher	Likud	Blue & White	Joint List	Shas	UTJ	Yamina	Labor- Gesher	Yisrael Beiteinu	Dem. Union	Zehut	Otzma Yehudit	Gov. (Note: Sum of government parties: Likud, Shas, UTJ, and Yamina)
**Pre-election seats**			**38**	35	10	8	8	6	6	5	4	–	–	60
**Election results**			32	**33**	13	9	7	7	6	8	5	N/A	(1.9%)	55
17 Sep	KANTAR	Kan 11	31	**32**	13	9	8	7	6	9	5	—N/a	–	55
17 Sep	Midgam	Channel 12	**32**	**32**	13	9	8	7	6	9	5	—N/a	–	55
17 Sep	Panel Project HaMidgam	Channel 13	30	**32**	15	9	8	6	6	8	6	—N/a	–	53
13 Sep	**Election silence starting end of Friday before election day.**													
13 Sep	Panel Project HaMidgam	Channel 13	**32**	**32**	12	6	7	9	4	9	5	—N/a	4	54
12–13 Sep	Midgam	Channel 12	**32**	**32**	10	7	8	8	5	8	6	—N/a	4	55
10–13 Sep	Shvakim Panorama	HOT	**33**	32	11	7	8	7	4	9	5	—N/a	4	55
12 Sep	Smith	Maariv	**33**	32	12	8	7	9	5	8	6	—N/a	(3.1%)	57
12 Sep	Panels Politics	Knesset Channel	**36**	32	10	7	8	9	4	9	5	—N/a	–	60
11–12 Sep	Smith	103fm	**33**	32	12	8	7	9	4	9	6	—N/a	(2.9%)	57
11–12 Sep	KANTAR	Kan 11	31	**33**	11	7	8	9	5	7	5	—N/a	4	55
10–11 Sep	Maagar Mohot	Israel Hayom	**33**	31	12	7	7	7	6	9	4	—N/a	4	54
10 Sep	Panel Project HaMidgam	Channel 13	31	**32**	11	6	7	9	5	9	6	—N/a	4	53
9–10 Sep	Midgam	Channel 12	31	**32**	9	7	7	9	6	9	6	—N/a	4	54
9 Sep	KANTAR	Kan 11	31	**32**	10	7	7	9	5	9	6	—N/a	4	54
8–9 Sep	Midgam	Walla!	32	**33**	9	6	7	9	6	8	6	—N/a	4	54
5 Sep	Panel Project HaMidgam	Channel 13	**32**	**32**	10	6	8	10	5	11	6	—N/a	(2.76%)	56
4–5 Sep	Maagar Mohot	Israel Hayom	**31**	30	11	8	7	8	6	11	4	—N/a	4	54
4–5 Sep	Smith	103fm & Maariv	**32**	**32**	9	8	7	9	6	10	7	—N/a	(2.5%)	56
4–5 Sep	Midgam	Channel 12	**32**	**32**	10	7	8	9	6	9	7	—N/a	(2.5%)	56
4 Sep	Panels Politics	Knesset Channel	**31**	**31**	10	7	8	10	5	9	5	—N/a	4	56
1–2 Sep	Midgam	Walla!	**32**	31	10	7	8	9	7	9	7	—N/a	(2.7%)	56
1 Sep	Panel Project HaMidgam	Channel 13	31	**32**	10	6	7	10	6	11	7	—N/a	(2.8%)	54
1 Sep	KANTAR	Kan 11	**32**	31	11	7	7	10	6	9	7	—N/a	(2.9%)	56
29 Aug	**Zehut announces withdrawal**													
27–29 Aug	Maagar Mohot	Israel Hayom	30	**32**	11	8	7	10	5	11	6	–	–	55
28 Aug	Smith	103fm/Maariv	**32**	31	10	8	7	10	5	10	7	(1.6%)	(2.5%)	57
28 Aug	Midgam	Channel 12	**31**	30	10	7	8	10	7	10	7	(1.2%)	(1.8%)	56
22–25 Aug	KANTAR	Kan 11	**32**	31	11	7	7	10	7	9	6	(1.7%)	(2.3%)	56
22 Aug	Midgam	Channel 12	**30**	**30**	11	7	8	11	6	10	7	(2.3%)	(1.9%)	56
22 Aug	Smith	103fm	**32**	30	11	8	7	10	5	10	7	(1.4%)	(2.2%)	57
20–22 Aug	Maagar Mohot	Israel Hayom	**32**	31	12	8	7	10	4	10	6	(2%)	(2%)	57
21 Aug	Midgam	Walla!	**31**	30	11	7	8	11	6	9	7	(2.8%)	(2.0%)	57
18 Aug	Direct Polls	Makor Rishon	**31**	29	10	8	8	11	7	9	7	(1.6%)	(2.3%)	58
15 Aug	Smith	103fm	**32**	30	11	8	7	9	6	10	7	(2.3%)	(1.7%)	56
15 Aug	Panel Project HaMidgam	Channel 13	**31**	**31**	9	6	7	12	5	11	8	(1.4%)	(2.1%)	56
13 Aug	Midgam	Channel 12	**30**	29	11	7	8	11	7	10	7	(2.9%)	(2.7%)	56
8 Aug	Smith	103fm	**32**	30	11	8	7	10	5	9	8	(1.8%)	(1.5%)	57
5 Aug	Direct Polls	Channel 13	**30**	29	11	7	7	11	7	10	8	(2.2%)	(1.9%)	55
5 Aug	Midgam	Walla!	**31**	29	11	7	8	11	6	10	7	(1.9%)	(2.2%)	57
4 Aug	KANTAR	Reshet Bet	29	**30**	11	7	7	11	6	11	8	(1.9%)	(2.8%)	54
2 Aug	Midgam	Channel 12	**30**	29	11	7	8	12	6	10	7	(2.2%)	(1.9%)	57
2 Aug	Smith	103fm	**31**	29	11	8	7	11	5	10	8	(1.2%)	(1.8%)	57
1 Aug	**Deadline for submitting the candidate lists**													
1 Aug	Panel Project HaMidgam	Channel 13	**30**	29	11	6	7	11	6	11	9	–	–	54
1 Aug	Maagar Mohot	Israel Hayom	**30**	28	12	7	7	11	6	10	9	(2%)	(2%)	55
31 Jul	**Kulanu officially dissolves and its remaining members join Likud**													
30 Jul	Midgam	Channel 12	**30**	**30**	11	7	8	12	5	10	7	(1.4%)	(1.2%)	57
29 Jul	**The URWP and the New Right agree to run together as Yamina**													

Date	Polling firm	Publisher	Likud– Kulanu	Blue & White	Joint List	Shas	UTJ	Labor- Gesher	Yisrael Beiteinu	URWP	Dem. Union	New Right	Zehut	Gov.
**Seats at dissolution**			39	35	10	8	8	6	5	5	4	–	–	60
26 Jul	Smith	103fm/Maariv	30	28	11	8	7	6	9	5	9	7	–	57
25 Jul	Panel Project HaMidgam	Channel 13	28	23	11	5	6	7	10	4	12	10	4	57
25 Jul	Midgam	Channel 12	29	27	11	7	8	5	10	4	10	9	(1.9%)	57
25 Jul	Maagar Mohot	Israel Hayom	31	30	12	7	7	5	7	6	9	6	–	57
25 Jul	KANTAR	Kan 11	30	**30**	10	7	8	5	9	4	8	9	(2.4%)	58
25 Jul	**Meretz, IDP and the Green Movement agree to run together as the Democratic Union**													

Date	Polling firm	Publisher	Likud– Kulanu	Blue & White	Joint List	Shas	UTJ	Labor- Gesher	Yisrael Beiteinu	URWP	Meretz	New Right	Zehut	IDP	Gov.
**Seats at dissolution**			39	35	10	8	8	6	5	5	4	–	–	N/A	60
25 Jul	Midgam & iPanel	Walla!	29	**29**	12	7	8	8	10	4	5	8	(1.9%)	(2.3%)	56
21 Jul	**Ayelet Shaked becomes the leader of the New Right**														
21 Jul	KANTAR	Kan 11	30	**30**	10	7	8	8	10	4	5	8	(1.2%)	(2.8%)	57
21 Jul	Midgam & iPanel	Channel 12	30	29	11	7	8	7	9	5	4	6	(1.8%)	4	56
19 Jul	Smith	103fm/Maariv	32	29	10	8	7	6	9	4	5	6	–	4	57
19 Jul	Direct Polls	Makor Rishon	32	29	11	7	8	6	8	4	5	5	(1%)	5	56
18 Jul	**Labor and Gesher agree to run on a joint list**														

Date	Polling firm	Publisher	Likud– Kulanu	Blue & White	Joint List	Shas	UTJ	Labor	Yisrael Beiteinu	URWP	Meretz	New Right	Zehut	Gesher	IDP	Gov.
**Seats at dissolution**			39	35	10	8	8	6	5	5	4	–	–	–	N/A	60
17 Jul	Dialog	Arutz Sheva	31	28	11	8	7	8	8	4	7	4	(1%)	–	4	54
16 Jul	Midgam	Channel 12	31	30	11	7	8	6	10	4	4	5	(1.7%)	–	4	55
12 Jul	Smith	103fm/Maariv	33	30	10	8	7	5	8	4	5	6	–	–	4	58
11 Jul	Midgam	Walla!	30	**30**	11	7	8	6	9	5	5	5	(2.7%)	–	4	55
9 Jul	**The Jewish Home and Tkuma agree to run together again as the URWP**															
4 Jul	Maagar Mohot	Israel Hayom	31	30	9	6	7	8	7	8	6	4	(1%)	–	4	56
3 Jul	Midgam	Channel 12	32	31	12	7	7	8	9	5	4	5	(2.1%)	–	(3%)	56
3 Jul	Statnet	Channel 13	31	29	9	7	6	7	8	4	4	5	4	–	6	57
2 Jul	**Labor elects Amir Peretz as its leader**															
27 Jun	**Meretz elects Nitzan Horowitz as its leader**															
26 Jun	Panel Project HaMidgam	Channel 13	32	**32**	12	6	6	5	7	4	6	4	–	–	6	52
26 Jun	**Former PM Ehud Barak announces the founding of the Israel Democratic Party**															
25 Jun	**Otzma Yehudit leaves the Union of the Right-Wing Parties**															
20 Jun	**Hadash–Ta'al and Ra'am–Balad agree to re-establish the Joint List**															

Date	Polling firm	Publisher	Likud– Kulanu	Blue & White	Shas	UTJ	Labor	Hadash –Ta'al	Yisrael Beiteinu	URWP	Meretz	Ra'am –Balad	New Right	Zehut	Gesher	Gov.
**Seats at dissolution**			39	35	8	8	6	6	5	5	4	4	–	–	–	60
20 Jun	Maagar Mohot	103fm	34	33	8	8	4	6	8	6	5	4	4	–	–	60
14 Jun	Maagar Mohot	103fm	35	33	7	8	4	6	8	5	5	4	5	–	–	60
7 Jun	Panels Politics	Maariv	37	33	7	8	4	7	7	6	4	(2.4%)	6	–	(2.2%)	**64**
2 Jun	Maagar Mohot	Israel Hayom	36	34	7	7	4	6	8	4	4	5	5	(2%)	–	59
30 May	Panels Politics	Maariv	37	33	7	8	(1.9%)	5	9	6	6	4	5	(1.4%)	–	**63**
30 May	Panel Project HaMidgam & Statnet	Channel 13	36	33	7	7	4	7	9	7	6	4	–	–	–	57
30 May	KANTAR	Kan 11	35	34	7	8	5	6	8	4	5	4	4	(3.1%)	(2.2%)	58
30 May	**The 21st Knesset is dissolved**															
28 May	**Kulanu and Likud agree to run on a joint list**															

Date	Polling firm	Publisher	Likud	Blue & White	Shas	UTJ	Labor	Hadash –Ta'al	Yisrael Beiteinu	URWP	Kulanu	Meretz	Ra'am –Balad	New Right	Zehut	Gesher	Gov.
28 May	Direct Polls	Makor Rishon	**34**	33	7	8	7	7	9	5	(1.67%)	5	(2.3%)	5	(1.44%)	(0.96%)	59
26 May	Panels Politics	Maariv	**35**	34	8	8	6	7	6	6	–	5	–	5	–	–	**62**
9 Apr	**Election results**		**35**	**35**	8	8	6	6	5	5	4	4	4	(3.22%)	(2.74%)	(1.73%)	60

=== Scenarios ===
Zehut, Otzma Yehudit & Noam withdraw

Date	Polling firm	Publisher	Likud	Blue & White	Joint List	Shas	UTJ	Labor-Gesher	Yamina	Yisrael Beiteinu	Dem. Union	Oth.	Gov.
27–29 Aug	Maagar Mohot	Israel Hayom	**31**	**31**	11	8	7	4	12	11	5	**62**	58

Left-Wing Union (including Democratic Union) and URWP + New Right

Date	Polling firm	Publisher	Likud	Blue & White	Joint List	Shas	UTJ	Labor+ Dem. Union	Yisrael Beiteinu	URWP+ New Right	Oth.	Gov.
25 Jul	KANTAR	Kan 11	**29**	**29**	10	7	8	14	8	15	**61**	59

Left-Wing Union (including Democratic Union)

Date	Polling firm	Publisher	Likud	Blue & White	Joint List	Shas	UTJ	Labor+ Dem. Union	Yisrael Beiteinu	URWP	New Right	Oth.	Gov.
25 Jul	Midgam	Channel 12	**29**	27	11	7	8	15	10	4	9	**63**	57

Union of the Right-Wing Parties + New Right headed by Ayelet Shaked (including Democratic Union and Zehut)

Date	Polling firm	Publisher	Likud	Blue & White	Joint List	Shas	UTJ	Labor	Yisrael Beiteinu	URWP+ New Right	Dem. Union	Zehut	Oth.	Gov.
25 Jul	Panel Project; HaMidgam & Statnet	Channel 13	**28**	23	11	5	6	7	10	14	12	4	**63**	57
25 Jul	Midgam	Channel 12	**28**	27	11	7	8	5	10	14	10	(1.9%)	**63**	57

Expanded Union of Right-Wing Parties headed by Ayelet Shaked (including Labor-Gesher)

Date	Polling firm	Publisher	Likud	Blue & White	Joint List	Shas	UTJ	Labor-Gesher	Yisrael Beiteinu	URWP+ New Right+ Zehut+ Otzma Yehudit	Meretz	IDP	Oth.	Gov.
25 Jul	Maagar Mohot	Israel Hayom	25	**31**	13	7	7	5	8	16	4	4	**65**	55

Expanded Union of Right-Wing Parties headed by Ayelet Shaked

Date	Polling firm	Publisher	Likud	Blue & White	Joint List	Shas	UTJ	Labor	Yisrael Beiteinu	URWP+ New Right+ Zehut+ Otzma Yehudit	Meretz	Gesher	IDP	Oth.	Gov.
18 Jul	Dialog	Arutz Sheva	**31**	28	10	7	8	7	8	10	7	–	4	**64**	56
16 Jul	Midgam	Channel 12	28	**30**	11	7	8	6	10	12	4	–	4	**65**	55

Expanded Union of Right-Wing Parties headed by Rafi Peretz (including Labor-Gesher)

Date	Polling firm	Publisher	Likud	Blue & White	Joint List	Shas	UTJ	Labor-Gesher	Yisrael Beiteinu	URWP+ New Right+ Zehut+ Otzma Yehudit	Meretz	IDP	Oth.	Gov.
25 Jul	Maagar Mohot	Israel Hayom	**32**	30	13	7	7	6	7	9	5	5	**66**	55

Expanded Union of Right-Wing Parties headed by Rafi Peretz

Date	Polling firm	Publisher	Likud	Blue & White	Joint List	Shas	UTJ	Labor	Yisrael Beiteinu	URWP+ New Right+ Zehut+ Otzma Yehudit	Meretz	Gesher	IDP	Oth.	Gov.
18 Jul	Dialog	Arutz Sheva	**32**	29	11	6	7	7	8	8	7	–	4	**67**	53
10 Jul	Kantar	Saloona	28	**29**	10	7	8	7	6	15	6	–	5	**62**	58
4 Jul	Maagar Mohot	Israel Hayom	25	**31**	8	6	7	7	6	19	7	–	4	**63**	57

Left-Wing Union

Date	Polling firm	Publisher	Likud	Blue & White	Joint List	Shas	UTJ	Labor+ IDP+ Meretz	Yisrael Beiteinu	URWP	New Right	Zehut	Gesher	Oth.	Gov.
16 Jul	Midgam	Channel 12	**31**	28	11	7	8	15	11	4	5	–	–	**65**	55
4 Jul	Maagar Mohot	Israel Hayom	**31**	26	8	6	7	19	7	8	8	–	–	**60**	**60**

Likud+Ayelet Shaked, URWP+Naftali Bennett

Date	Polling firm	Publisher	Likud	Blue & White	Shas	UTJ	Labor	Hadash –Ta'al	Yisrael Beiteinu	URWP	Meretz	Ra'am –Balad	Zehut	Gesher	Oth.	Gov.
30 May	Panels Politics	Maariv	**41**	34	7	8	–	4	8	7	6	5	–	–	57	**63**

Gabi Ashkenazi leading Blue & White

Date	Polling firm	Publisher	Likud	Blue & White	Shas	UTJ	Labor	Hadash –Ta'al	Yisrael Beiteinu	URWP	Meretz	Ra'am –Balad	New Right	Zehut	Gesher	Oth.	Gov.
14 Jun	Maagar Mohot	103fm	33	**35**	7	8	4	6	8	4	5	4	5	–	–	**63**	57

Zehut and New Right merger

Date	Polling firm	Publisher	Likud	Blue & White	Joint List	Shas	UTJ	Labor	Yisrael Beiteinu	Meretz	URWP	New Right –Zehut	Gesher	IDP	Oth.	Gov.
10 Jul	Kantar	Saloona	**30**	29	10	7	8	6	8	6	5	6	–	4	**64**	56
9 Jul	Kantar	Kan 11	**30**	**30**	9	7	8	7	9	6	4	5	–	5	**66**	54

Zehut and New Right merger and Left-Wing Union

Date	Polling firm	Publisher	Likud	Blue & White	Joint List	Shas	UTJ	Labor+ IDP+ Meretz	Yisrael Beiteinu	URWP	New Right –Zehut	Gesher	Oth.	Gov.
10 Jul	Kantar	Saloona	29	**30**	10	7	8	18	7	5	6	–	**65**	55

Labor and Meretz merger without Gesher

Date	Polling firm	Publisher	Likud	Blue & White	Joint List	Shas	UTJ	Labor+ Meretz	Yisrael Beiteinu	URWP	New Right	Zehut	Gesher	IDP	Oth.	Gov.
19 Jul	Smith	103fm/Maariv	**32**	27	10	8	7	13	9	4	6	–	–	4	**63**	57

Labor and IDP merger without Gesher, Expanded Union of Right-Wing Parties headed by Ayelet Shaked

Date	Polling firm	Publisher	Likud	Blue & White	Joint List	Shas	UTJ	Labor+ IDP	Yisrael Beiteinu	URWP+ New Right+ Zehut+ Otzma Yehudit	Meretz	Gesher	Oth.	Gov.
19 Jul	Direct Polls	Makor Rishon	**30**	28	11	7	8	11	8	12	5	–	**63**	57

Labor and IDP merger without Gesher, Expanded Union of Right-Wing Parties headed by Rafi Peretz

Date	Polling firm	Publisher	Likud	Blue & White	Joint List	Shas	UTJ	Labor+ IDP	Yisrael Beiteinu	URWP+ New Right+ Zehut+ Otzma Yehudit	Meretz	Gesher	Oth.	Gov.
19 Jul	Direct Polls	Makor Rishon	**33**	29	11	8	8	10	9	7	5	–	**64**	56

IDP and Meretz merger, New Right and URWP merger

Date	Polling firm	Publisher	Likud	Blue & White	Joint List	Shas	UTJ	Labor-Gesher	Yisrael Beiteinu	New Right+ URWP	IDP+ Meretz	Oth.	Gov.
21 Jul	KANTAR	Kan 11	28	**29**	10	7	8	7	10	12	9	**65**	55

URWP, New Right, and Otzma Yehudit merger

Date	Polling firm	Publisher	Likud	Blue & White	Joint List	Shas	UTJ	Labor-Gesher	Yisrael Beiteinu	URWP+ New Right+ Otzma Yehudit	Meretz	Zehut	IDP	Oth.	Gov.
21 Jul	Midgam	Channel 12	28	**29**	11	7	8	7	9	13	4	(1.9%)	4	**64**	56

Democratic Union & URWP, New Right, and Otzma Yehudit merger

Date	Polling firm	Publisher	Likud+ Kulanu	Blue & White	Joint List	Shas	UTJ	Labor-Gesher	Yisrael Beiteinu	UR+ Otzma	Dem. Union	Zehut	Oth.	Gov.
1 Aug	Maagar Mohot	Israel Hayom	**29**	28	12	7	7	5	11	13	8	–	**64**	56
30 Jul	Midgam	Channel 12	29	**30**	11	7	8	5	10	13	7	(2.2%)	**63**	57

Democratic Union & URWP, New Right, Zehut, and Otzma Yehudit merger

Date	Polling firm	Publisher	Likud+ Kulanu	Blue & White	Joint List	Shas	UTJ	Labor-Gesher	Yisrael Beiteinu	UR+ Zehut+ Otzma	Dem. Union	Oth.	Gov.
30 Jul	Midgam	Channel 12	28	**30**	11	7	8	5	10	14	7	**63**	57

== Preferred prime minister polls ==
Some opinion pollsters have asked voters which party leader they would prefer as Prime Minister. Their responses are given as percentages in the tables below.

Netanyahu vs Gantz

Date	Polling firm	Publisher	Netanyahu	Gantz	Neither	Don't Know
13 Sep	Panel Project HaMidgam	Channel 13	46	31	14	–
12–13 Sep	Midgam	Channel 12	41	31	19	9
12 Sep	Panels Politics	Knesset Channel	39	29	–	–
9–10 Sep	Midgam	Channel 12	40	33	–	–
8–9 Sep	Midgam	Walla!	39	30	19	8
4–5 Sep	Midgam	Channel 12	41	31	–	28
1–2 Sep	Midgam	Walla!	39	30	17	9
28 Aug	Midgam	Channel 12	43	29	19	9
22 Aug	Midgam	Channel 12	42	29	21	8
12 Aug	Midgam	Channel 12	41	32	21	6
5 Aug	Midgam	Walla!	43	30	17	6
1 Aug	Panel Project HaMidgam	Channel 13	43	32	17	–
30 Jul	Midgam	Channel 12	42	32	18	8
25 Jul	Panel Project HaMidgam	Channel 13	40	33	17	10
25 Jul	Midgam	Channel 12	42	30	–	–
25 Jul	Midgam & iPanel	Walla!	41	30	22	5
21 Jul	Midgam	Channel 12	39	29	22	10
16 Jul	Midgam	Channel 12	40	28	22	10
3 Jul	Midgam	Channel 12	40	30	21	9
30 May	KANTAR	Kan 11	44	38	–	–

Netanyahu vs Barak

Date	Polling firm	Publisher	Netanyahu	Barak	Neither	Don't Know
3 Jul	Midgam	Channel 12	41	16	34	9

General

Date	Polling firm	Publisher	Netanyahu	Gantz	Lapid	Ashkenazi	Gabbay	Peretz	Lieberman	Bennett	Shaked	Barak
10–11 Sep	Maagar Mohot	Israel Hayom	42	28	2	–	–	3	3	–	4	3
4–5 Sep	Maagar Mohot	Israel Hayom	40	23	3	–	–	4	3	–	5	3
4 Sep	Panels Politics	Knesset Channel	34	24	2	6	–	–	2	–	–	–
27–29 Aug	Maagar Mohot	Israel Hayom	40	24	4	–	–	2	4	–	6	4
20–22 Aug	Maagar Mohot	Israel Hayom	39	23	5	–	–	3	3	–	5	4
1 Aug	Maagar Mohot	Israel Hayom	35	24	–	–	–	5	6	–	10	7
11 Jul	Midgam	Walla!	42	22	–	–	–	–	6	–	–	7
4 Jul	Maagar Mohot	Israel Hayom	35	22	–	–	–	4	3	–	–	12
3 Jul	Statnet	Channel 13	46	22	–	–	–	–	–	–	–	10
2 Jun	Maagar Mohot	Israel Hayom	39	27	3	3	2	–	5	3	–	–

== Potential bias ==
Direct Polls institute, which conducts some of the polls, is owned by Shlomo Filber, the former director general of the Ministry of Communications and Likud campaign manager in the 2015 Israeli legislative election. Filber turned state's evidence in Case 4000, in which Prime Minister of Israel Benjamin Netanyahu has been indicted for bribery. In the April 2019 Israeli legislative election, Filber advised the New Right campaign, potentially compromising his objectivity. Filber's polling method is controversial and is based on SMS.

== See also ==
- April 2019 Israeli legislative election
- 2019 in Israel
- List of elections in 2019
