= Labor-Gesher-Meretz =

Joint list of the Israeli Labor, Gesher, and Meretz parties

Labor-Gesher-Meretz העבודה-גשר-מרצ
- Abbreviation: Emet
- Leader: Amir Peretz
- Founders: Amir Peretz (Labor); Orly Levy (Gesher); Nitzan Horowitz (Meretz)
- Founded: 13 January 2020
- Dissolved: 6 April 2020
- Preceded by: Labor-Gesher; Democratic Union
- Ideology: Social democracy Welfarism; Labor Zionism
- Political position: Centre-left
- Member parties: Labor; Gesher (Note: left the alliance on 23 March 2020); Meretz
- Colours: Red; Azure; Green
- 23rd Knesset: 7 / 120

Election symbol
- אמת

Website
- emet2020.co.il

Labor-Gesher-Meretz (Hebrew: העבודה-גשר-מרצ, romanized: HaAvoda-Gesher-Meretz) or Emet (Hebrew: אמת; English: Truth), known as Labor-Meretz (Hebrew: העבודה-מרצ, romanized: HaAvoda-Meretz) from March to April 2020, was an Israeli centre-left electoral list composed of three parties – the Israeli Labor Party, Gesher and Meretz. The list ran in the 2020 legislative election, led by Amir Peretz, chairman of the Labor Party. The list received seven seats in the election, of which three were for Labor, one was for Gesher and three were for Meretz.

== History ==
On 13 January 2020, Labor and Meretz leaders Amir Peretz and Nitzan Horowitz announced a technical unification of the lists ahead of the elections to the 23rd Knesset for fear that one or more of the lists would not pass the threshold. The union promoted negotiations with the Blue and White alliance, in which it was agreed that the number of ministers to be assigned to the Labor-Gesher and Meretz factions in Benny Gantz's future government would be based on the number of faction members in the 22nd Knesset (6 and 5, respectively). The Gesher party, led by Orly Levy-Abekasis, who ran together with the Labor Party in the previous elections in the framework of Labor-Gesher, continued the expanded cooperation. The Democratic Union list, of which Meretz was a part in the previous elections, disintegrated, but Yair Golan of the Israel Democratic Party, which was part of the Democratic Union, joined Meretz in preparation for closing the lists.

For the purpose of unification, Yair Golan was initially supposed to join on the basis of the Democratic Choice shelf party, which former leader Roman Bronfman made available to him for this purpose, but finally, in light of technical difficulties, Yair Golan and Emilie Moatti (who previously ran in Labor primaries) joined Meretz.

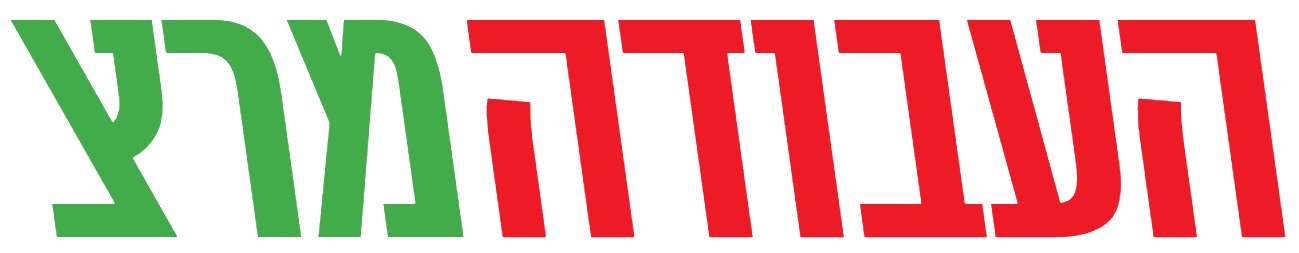
Logo of Labor-Meretz after the split with Gesher

Immediately after the inauguration of the Twenty-third Knesset, on 17 March 2020, Gesher submitted a request to split into a separate parliamentary group, amid controversy over the possibility of a minority government supporting the joint list. The request was received on 23 March 2020 and the faction split into "Labor-Meretz" and Gesher. On 4 April, Peretz announced that he intended to split from the joint faction with Meretz following contacts with the Labor Party entering the government, and the split was approved two days later.

In 2024, four years after the abortive attempt at a joint faction, Labor and Meretz performed another merger, this time more thoroughly into a single party called The Democrats.

== Election results ==
Election year	# of overall votes	% of overall vote	# of overall seats won	+/–	Leader	Government/Opposition
2020	267,480 (#6)	5.83	7 / 120	▼2	Amir Peretz	Disbanded during the formation of the government

== Composition ==
Name	Ideology	Position	Leader	Former MKs
Labor	Social democracy	Centre-left	Amir Peretz	3 / 120
Meretz	Progressivism	Left-wing	Nitzan Horowitz	3 / 120
Gesher (Note: left the alliance on 23 March 2020)	Social liberalism	Centre	Orly Levy	1 / 120

== Knesset members ==
The list of candidates for the 23rd Knesset elections, as submitted to the Central Election Commission on 15 January, and the following Knesset members were elected from among them:

Labor, Gesher, Meretz

#	Name	Notes
1	Amir Peretz	Labor leader and former Minister of Defense; became Minister of Economy in the Netanyahu-Gantz government
2	Orly Levy	Gesher leader and former Yisrael Beiteinu MK; became Minister for Community Empowerment and Advancement in the Netanyahu-Gantz government; later a Likud MK
3	Nitzan Horowitz	Meretz leader; later Minister of Health in the Bennett-Lapid government
4	Tamar Zandberg	Meretz MK and former leader; later Minister of Environmental Protection in the Bennett-Lapid government
5	Itzik Shmuli	Labor MK and leader of 2011 Israeli social justice protests; became Minister of Labor, Social Affairs and Social Services in the Netanyahu-Gantz government
6	Merav Michaeli	Labor MK, feminist activist and journalist; later penultimate Labor leader and Minister of Transport in the Bennett-Lapid government
7	Yair Golan	Meretz MK, retired major general in the IDF; later the final Labor leader and the first leader of the Democrats
