= Labor-Gesher =

Joint list of the Israeli Israeli Labor Party and Gesher parties

Labor-Gesher העבודה-גשר
- Leader: Amir Peretz; Orly Levy
- Founded: 18 July 2019
- Dissolved: 23 March 2020
- Succeeded by: Labor-Gesher-Meretz
- Ideology: Labor Zionism; Social democracy Social liberalism Two-state solution Economic egalitarianism
- Political position: Centre-left
- Member parties: Labor; Gesher
- Colours: Red, black
- Slogan: People before everything.
- Most MKs: 6 (2019)

Election symbol
- אמת

Website
- www.haavoda.org.il

Labor-Gesher was a joint list of the Israeli Labor Party and Gesher parties for elections for the twenty-second Knesset. The list advocated social democracy and progressive taxation. The list's platform focused primarily on socio-economic issues. The list was jointly headed by Amir Peretz of the Israeli Labor Party and Orly Levy of the Gesher party.

The list was superseded by the Labor-Gesher-Meretz list for the 2020 Israeli legislative election.

== Formation and history ==
The Labor party's support collapsed in the April 2019 legislative election, being reduced to only 4.43% of votes and 6 seats, marking it as the worst result in the party's history. In reaction to the bad result, party leader Avi Gabbay and MK Tal Russo resigned, leading to a leadership election being called. In July 2019, Amir Peretz was elected as the new leader of the Labor party. Peretz declared that he would reform the party and bring in new forces and demographics to expand the party's base. Nitzan Horowitz, the newly elected leader of Meretz and former Labor party leader and prime minister Ehud Barak, called on Peretz to enter talks on setting up a united left wing list. Shortly after the leadership election, another Labor MK Shelly Yachimovich also resigned, meaning half of Labor's Knesset representation was now resigned.

On 18 July 2019, Amir Peretz and Orly Levy-Abekasis, the chairwoman of Gesher, announced a joint run in the elections for the twenty-second Knesset. Gesher would receive three out of the first ten spots on Labor's list. Peretz decided that the list would not be joined by other parties, shunning Meretz and Ehud Barak.

The merger with Gesher was met with protests within the Labor party, and MKs Stav Shaffir and Itzik Shmuli were dissatisfied that Peretz shunned the merger with Meretz and Barak. This dissatisfaction led to the resignation of Stav Shaffir, who left the Labor party to form the Democratic Union with Meretz and Ehud Barak. Shmuli eventually decided to remain in the Labor party and criticized his colleague's move.

On 25 August, Amir Peretz shaved his signature mustache, telling voters to "read his lips" and that he and the Labor-Gesher alliance would not sit in a government led by Benjamin Netanyahu. However, Peretz has considered becoming a minister in a Netanyahu government.

The alliance was officially dissolved on 23 March 2020, when Levy left the alliance to protest the possible formation of a minority government headed by Blue and White and backed by the Joint List.

== Economic plan ==
The Labor-Gesher alliance's signature proposal was their socio-economic plan which the party calls "People before everything". The plan included:

- An increase of the minimum wage to 40 shekels (around $11.65 USD).
- Construction of 200,000 public housing apartments.
- Provision of free education from birth.
- An increase of funding for the public healthcare system with an increase in care equality.
- Institution of a minimum pension for poor pensioners and an increase in the disability allowances.
- Reducing VAT rates to 0% on 100 basic goods.
- Increased investment in small business and protection of the rights of the self-employed.
- Protection of worker's rights and a crackdown on the phenomenon of outsourcing labor.
- Investments in the weakest segments of Israeli society which will total to around $8.5 billion.

These proposals and plans would have been funded by:

- An increase in the income tax rate to 57% for income between $12,000 to $15,000 and 65% for income over $15,000 a month.
- An increase in the capital gains tax rate to 35%.
- A fight against tax avoidance.
- Cutting the funds given out in government coalition agreements and cutting the funding to isolated Israeli settlements in the West Bank.
- An increase in the Debt-to-GDP ratio through borrowing.

The proposal received criticism from the economic right shortly after its announcement. Naftali Bennett of the right wing Yamina party said the plan would "turn Israel into Venezuela", this criticism was also supported by Yair Lapid of the centrist Blue and White party.

== Composition ==
Name	Ideology	Position	Leader	Former MKs
Labor	Social democracy	Centre-left	Amir Peretz	3 / 120
Gesher	Social liberalism	Centre to Centre-left	Orly Levy	1 / 120

== Former MKs ==
The Labor-Gesher alliance had four Knesset members. They are listed below in the order that they appeared on the party's list for the list for the 2020 elections:

Labor, Gesher

#	Name	Notes
1	Amir Peretz	Labor leader and former Minister of Defense
2	Orly Levy	Gesher leader and former Yisrael Beiteinu MK
3	Itzik Shmuli	Labor MK and leader of 2011 Israeli social justice protests
4	Merav Michaeli	Labor MK, feminist activist and journalist

== Election results ==
Election year	# of overall votes	% of overall vote	# of overall seats won	+/–	Leader	Government/Opposition
September 2019	210,851 (#8)	4.80	6 / 120	new party	Amir Peretz	Snap election
