= Stav Shaffir =

Israeli social activist and politician

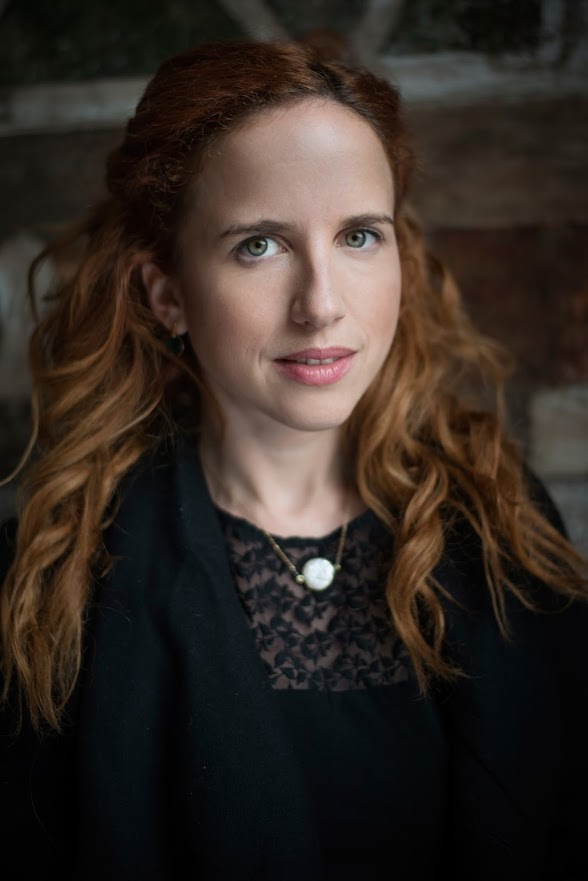
- Shaffir in 2015

Faction represented in the Knesset
- 2013–2015: Labor Party
- 2015–2019: Zionist Union
- 2019: Labor Party
- 2019–2020: Democratic Union

Personal details
- Born: 17 May 1985 (age 41) Netanya, Israel

Stav Shaffir (Hebrew: סְתָיו שָׁפִיר; born 17 May 1985) is an Israeli politician and former member of the Knesset. She is the leader of the Green Party and was a member of the Knesset for the Democratic Union alliance. She came to national prominence as one of the leaders of the 2011 Israeli social justice protests, focusing on housing, public services, income inequality and democracy, and later became spokeswoman of the movement. She was subsequently elected to the Knesset as a member of the Labor Party in 2013. The party contested the 2015 elections as part of the Zionist Union alliance, with Shaffir retaining her seat. She was re-elected again in the April 2019 elections, in which Labor ran alone. However, after losing a Labor leadership election to Amir Peretz in June 2019, she left the party and resigned from the Knesset and became head of the Green Movement. Her new party formed the Democratic Union alongside Meretz and the Israel Democratic Party. Shaffir lost her Knesset seat in the 2020 election.

== Biography ==
Shaffir was born in Netanya, Israel, to a family of Ashkenazi Jewish, Polish-Jewish, Lithuanian-Jewish, Romanian-Jewish, and Iraqi-Jewish descent. At the age of 12, Shaffir's family moved to Pardesiya, a small town in the Sharon area, where her parents had an accounting firm. Shaffir joined HaNoar HaOved VeHaLomed (Federation of Working and Studying Youth). After high school, Shaffir worked for a year in Tiberias as a part of a volunteer group affiliated with the Society for the Protection of Nature in Israel. She served in the Israel Defense Forces as a cadet in the flight academy of the Israeli Air Force. After five months, she began to write for the IDF magazine, Bamahane. In this position she covered the Israeli disengagement from Gaza and the 2006 Lebanon war.

After completing her military service, Shaffir was accepted into the Olive Tree Scholarship Program by the City University of London, an initiative to support future leaders who desire to change the status quo of the Israeli-Palestinian conflict. During her studies in London, Shaffir worked as an intern in the British Parliament as part of the Undergraduate ParliaMentors program and was awarded runner up in the JRS Competition for Student Journalists in 2008 for her piece covering Iraqi refugees in England. Shaffir received a B.A in Sociology and Journalism in 2009. Shaffir, who plays the piano, drums, guitar, violin and oud, continued her studies in Israel at the Rimon School of Jazz and Contemporary Music in Ramat-HaSharon for a year. She then enrolled in the M.A program at the Cohn Institute for the History and Philosophy of Science and Ideas at Tel Aviv University.

Shaffir worked as a freelance journalist and an editor for National Geographic, the Ha'ir weekly newspaper, the Mako Magazine and Yedioth Ahronoth internet site Xnet, where she published the first article to appear in the Israeli media about the 2011 Israeli social justice protests.

In 2021, Shaffir took part in the second season of The Singer in the Mask as the Beetle (Ladybug) and was the ninth contestant eliminated.

== Social activism ==
Shaffir, along with Daphni Leef and Itzik Shmuli, was a founder, organizer and unofficial leader of the 2011 Israeli social justice protests, when about 400,000 Israelis went to the streets in a series of public demonstrations.

On 17 July 2011, Shaffir debated with Likud MK Miri Regev on the current events television program "Erev Hadash" about the protest against the housing prices. In the following months, she helped found over 120 tent camps throughout Israel, led demonstrations, including the March of the Million, and lobbied with members of the Knesset to pursue a social justice agenda. She served as spokesperson for the Israeli media and represented the protest movement in foreign media outlets. In 2012, Shaffir was a keynote speaker at three U.S.-based conferences: J Street, together with Israeli writer Amos Oz, the Jewish Federations of North America's TribeFest and the Personal Democracy Forum.

In February 2012, Shaffir and fellow tent protesters Alon-Lee Green and Yonatan Levi founded the Israeli Social Movement. In August 2012, Shaffir and her colleagues embarked on a tour from the southern sea port of Eilat to Kiryat Shmona on the Lebanese border, to listen to activists and citizens regarding their concerns. Their last status was published in Facebook on 9 September 2012, and a month later Shaffir announced her intent to run for the Knesset as a member of the Labor Party.

== Political career ==
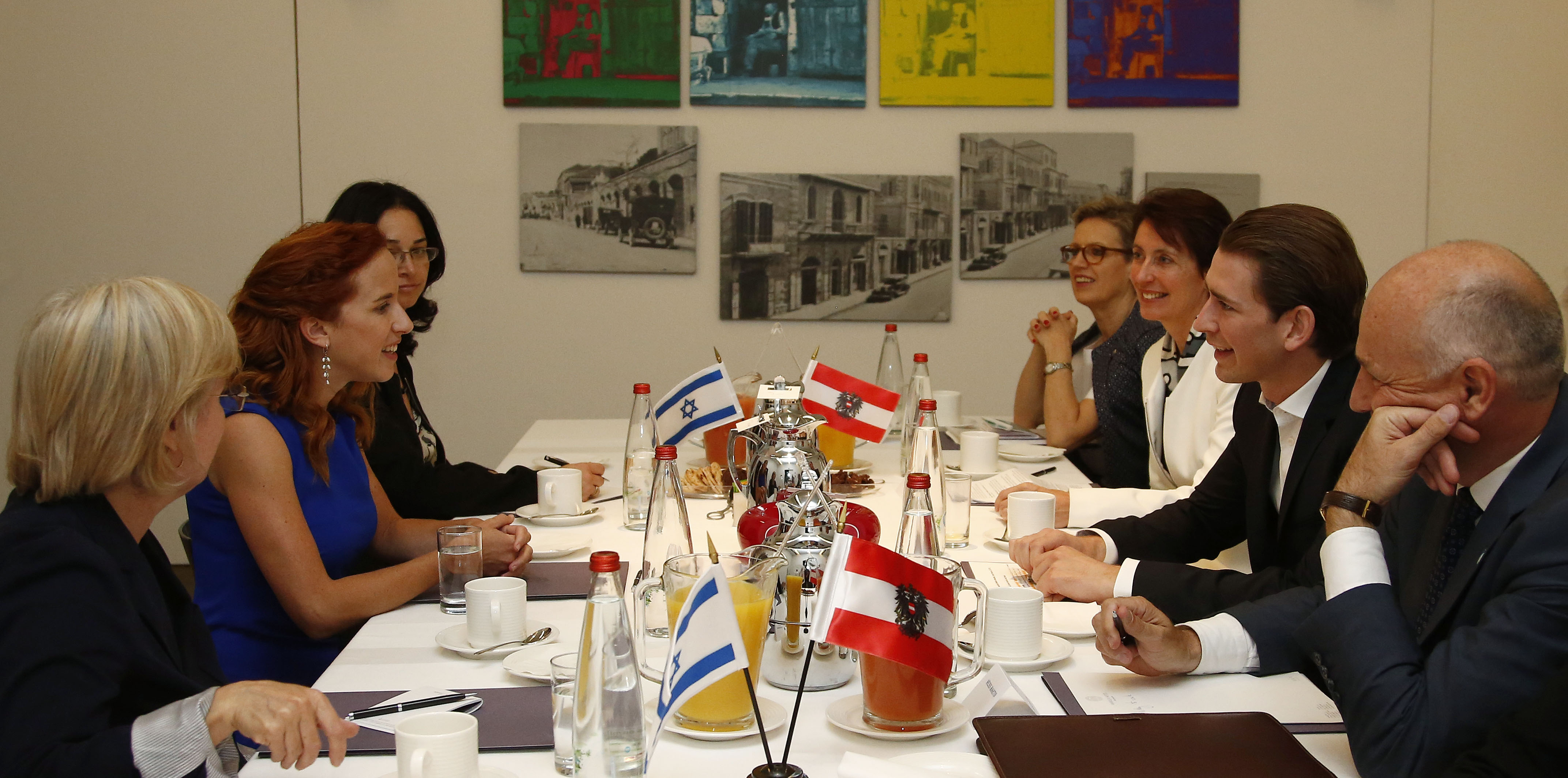
Shaffir with Austrian Prime Minister Sebastian Kurz in Jerusalem, 2016

Shaffir was approached by the Labor Party in May 2012 to join its ranks in preparation for the 2013 general elections held on 22 January 2013. She officially declared her candidacy for the Labor Party list on 12 October 2012. Shaffir placed 9th (moving up to 8th after Amir Peretz's resignation) as a result of the 29 November 2012 primaries, securing her a seat in the Knesset following the 22 January 2013 general elections. After the 13 January 2015 primaries, Shaffir placed second, and so holds the third place on the internal party list (after party leader Isaac Herzog and Shelly Yachimovich). In the combined Labor-Hatnuah party, Shaffir holds the fourth place due to Hatnuah Leader Tzipi Livni's placement behind Herzog.

Initially elected at age 27, Shaffir became the youngest female Knesset member in its history. She was also the MK with the lowest net worth, a total of $20,000, owning neither an apartment nor a car. She was one of eight MKs to forgo their 2015 pay raise calling it "distasteful" in light of wage stagnation in the Israeli job market.

On 2 July 2019, Shaffir ran for the head of the Labor Party, and got 27% of the votes after Peretz, who received 47% of the votes. Shmuli reached third after Shaffir, and got 26% of the votes.

=== Financial transparency ===
Shaffir's key accomplishment during her first term was instituting greater financial transparency in the Israeli State budget as a member of the Knesset Finance Committee.

In May 2012, Shaffir joined 10,000 protestors demanding that the proposed 2013 Israeli State Budget be made more favorable to middle and lower income Israelis. Shaffir appointed a team of volunteers to investigate the budgetary transfers and eventually brought her concerns to the Supreme Court, which ruled that the Finance Ministry must reach a compromise with Shaffir on a new method for budget transfers by February 2015.

Shaffir was an advocate of fair compensation for residents of southern Israel who were most impacted by the 2014 Operation Protective Shield in Gaza. She objected to a political deal to transfer millions of shekels to settlements and nothing to the South. Shaffir got funds allocated to local authorities impacted by rocket fire in the South, but 73 days after Operation Protective Shield began, the funds had yet to be transferred. In response, Shaffir called for a meeting to address the lack of action.

Shaffir objected to the transfer of millions of shekels to the World Zionist Organization Settlement Division, which circumvents oversight because legally it is under no obligation to report what it does with government funding. She wrote a letter complaining that Finance Committee Chair Slomiansky should not be allowed to conduct meetings on the World Zionist Organization Settlement Division’s budget. Shaffir also argued against funding for the Jewish Identity Administration which she considered a ploy to promote a right wing political agenda.

Following the dismissal of Finance Minister Yair Lapid by Prime Minister Netanyahu on 2 December 2014, the Finance Committee transferred millions of shekels to the settlements, despite objections by Shaffir. She was repeatedly forcibly removed from Committee meetings for complaining about the lack of clear information about what was being voted on. On 19 February 2015, the World Zionist Organization (WZO) announced that it would end the Prime Minister Office's oversight over the Settlement Division. Shaffir had publicly criticized their secret dealings that included extensive indirect funding for building West Bank settlements. "Coupled with reports of possibly illegal abuse of funds, the division has faced calls for reform from both the left and center, especially ahead of the March 17 election." The WZO also said it would increase transparency and make its records public, with the appointment of a special comptroller to look into the division's workings.

=== Special Committee for the Transparency and Accessibility of Government Information ===
In July 2015 it was decided that Shaffir would start and chair a new semi permanent committee in parliament, The Special Committee for the Transparency and Accessibility of Government Information (also known as the 'Transparency committee'). The committee deals with transparency and accountability, open government, open data and e-gov in all branches of government in Israel.

=== Women rights and freedom of religious practice ===
Shaffir donned a tallit and joined Women of the Wall in prayer at the Western Wall in Jerusalem in March 2013. Shaffir and her fellow parliamentarians were initially barred from attending – according to the police, women wearing tallit were a "disturbance of public order" – but their legal status as legislators forced the police to let them pray. She joined the women in solidarity with their equal right to pray, but also for the broader struggle for freedom of religion in Israel – "our freedom to live how we want to live, with our own beliefs and our own personal way of practicing Judaism or other religions."

In spring 2014, Shaffir traveled to the US as a member of a delegation of female Knesset members studying the role of women in legislatures.

When it was reported during the 2014 Israel–Gaza conflict that shelters in the city of Ashdod were excluding women from so-called "men only" shelters, Shaffir filed an urgent complaint with the Religious Affairs Ministry, demanding to put an immediate halt to the segregation. It was promptly ended.

=== LGBT rights ===
Shaffir proposed legislation in May 2013 that would allow same-sex couples to get government recognition for civil unions. Despite wide support within the Labor Party and from individual Knesset members from Likud and Hatnua, Yesh Atid blocked the bill in favor of their own civil unions bill. After a Haaretz poll showed support from 70% of Israelis for full and equal rights for the gay community, Shaffir with the help of attorneys and community activists, compiled a list of 12 ways to benefit the LGBTQ community through ministerial regulatory action, sidestepping the need for legislation. These include rules making it easier for same-sex couples to adopt and to enter into surrogacy arrangements.

=== Socioeconomic justice and peace ===
Shaffir spoke about connecting socioeconomic issues with the Israeli-Palestinian peace process at the Fall 2013 J Street Conference in Washington, DC. She also spoke to the need for cautious exploration of non-violent means for Israel to resolve its conflict with Iran. In her keynote speech at the 2015 J Street Conference, Shaffir spoke of her vision of an Israel that celebrates diversity and treats the poor with compassion but above all "an Israel that does not control millions of Palestinians."

Shaffir with MKs Yehiel Bar and Orly Levi launched a lobby for the advancement of fair rent after a report prepared by the Knesset Research and Information Center found that rents across Israel had increased by 49% since 2007. On 13 February 2014, Shaffir proposed legislation to regulate the rental housing market. The Housing Cabinet adopted her proposed fair rental law.

=== Asylum policy ===
Shaffir advocated for Israel to adopt a formal asylum policy that distinguishes between refugees and migrants with quotas based on Israel’s capacity for absorption. She supported the Supreme Court’s quashing of the 2012 Law for the Prevention of Infiltration (Amendment no. 3) (temporary order), which mandated an almost automatic three-year detention of ‘infiltrators.’ She said, "We are a country based on refugees. My grandmother escaped from Iraq and my grandfather escaped during the Holocaust. It is a country that knows what it means to escape with your life."

=== OECD Committee on Government Transparency ===
On 11 February 2017, Shaffir was appointed Chair of the newly established Committee of Government transparency in the OECD organization. The Committee is a joint initiative led by Shaffir, the Israeli Foreign Affairs ministry and the OECD representative in Israel. The first meeting took place in Paris, on 12 February 2017 and had representatives from more than 90 countries.

=== Democratic Union ===
In July 2019, Shaffir left the Labor party to run as part of the Democratic Union party, a union of the Green Movement (which Shaffir now leads), Meretz and Israel Democratic Party. She resigned from the Knesset and was replaced by the next person on the Labor list, Merav Michaeli.

=== Green Party ===
In December 2019, Shaffir announced that she would be renaming the Green Movement the Green Party, and would run independently in the 2020 elections. Shaffir was re-elected as the head of the party on 29 January 2021.

== Awards ==
- On 28 November 2018, Apolitical, a global policy platform in London, included Shaffir in its list of the Hundred Future Leaders: The World’s Most Influential Young People in Government for 2018, which included among the rest Alexandria Ocasio-Cortez, Michael Tubbs, Naisula Lesuuda and Sayida Ounissi. Avi Gabbay, the chairman of the Israeli Labor Party, praised Shaffir for her achievement.
