= National camp =

Right-wing Israeli political alliance

In Israeli politics, the national camp (Hebrew: המחנה הלאומי) or right-wing bloc is an informal coalition of nationalist and right-wing, religious conservative political parties that since 1977 has frequently co-operated to form governments. The coalition is led by Likud, and includes parties to its political right, such as Otzma Yehudit and the Religious Zionist Party, as well as religious parties. Generally, the two Haredi parties (Shas and the United Torah Judaism alliance) align with Likud. In the past, the coalition has included the National Religious Party, the National Union, Gesher, Tkuma, The Jewish Home, the New Right (until 2020), and Yisrael Beiteinu (until late 2019).

== Right-wing bloc ==
Following the September 2019 Israeli legislative election, Israeli Prime Minister Benjamin Netanyahu formed a "right-wing bloc" for the purposes of coalition negotiations, consisting of Likud, Shas, United Torah Judaism and Yamina, that would support Netanyahu as Prime Minister. In February 2021, Yamina left the bloc to pursue negotiations with opposition parties, and the Religious Zionist Party, which had split from Yamina, also declined to sign on, despite supporting Netanyahu as Prime Minister. However, the Religious Zionist Party later rejoined the bloc and participated in bloc meetings.

Following the fall of the Netanyahu government in June 2021, the four parties of the right-wing bloc went into the opposition, but continued to hold regular joint meetings in Netanyahu's office. The bloc returned to power under Netanyahu's leadership following the 2022 Israeli legislative election, forming the thirty-seventh government of Israel.

== Composition ==
=== Current ===
Name	Years	Position	Ideology	Leader	MKs
Likud	1977–present	Right-wing	Conservatism (Israeli)	Benjamin Netanyahu	32 / 120
Shas	1984–present	Social:Right-wing Fiscal: Center-left	Religious conservatism (Sephardi-Haredi) Social Democracy	Aryeh Deri	11 / 120
United Torah Judaism	1992–present	Social:Right-wing Fiscal: Center-left	Religious conservatism (Ashkenazi-Haredi) Social Democracy	Yitzhak Goldknopf	7 / 120
Religious Zionist Party	2023–present	Far-right	Religious Zionism; Ultranationalism	Bezalel Smotrich	7 / 120
Otzma Yehudit	2013–present	Far-right	Kahanism	Itamar Ben-Gvir	6 / 120
New Hope	2023–present	Centre-right to right-wing	National liberalism	Gideon Sa'ar	4 / 120
Noam	2019–present	Far-right	Religious Zionism; Social conservatism	Avi Maoz	1 / 120

a: Includes Agudat Israel and Degel HaTorah.
b: Merger of National Union-Tkuma and The Jewish Home.
c: Membership in the government currently terminated.

=== Right-wing parties not in the bloc ===
Name	Years	Position	Ideology	Leader	MKs
Yisrael Beiteinu	1999–2019	Right-wing	Conservatism (Israeli); National liberalism	Avigdor Lieberman	6 / 120

In January 2022, Israeli Prime Minister Naftali Bennett suggested he was planning to form a "new national camp" with Yamina, Yisrael Beiteinu and New Hope, excluding Likud. The three parties parted their ways during the collapse of 36th Cabinet of Israel. In August 2024, Gideon Sa'ar, the leader of New Hope, called for the unification of what he described as the "liberal right-wing camp", which would also include Yisrael Beiteinu and Bennett's New Right.

== Knesset seats ==
Knesset	Years	Leader	MKs
1	1949–1951	Menachem Begin	38 / 120
2	1951–1955	Menachem Begin	43 / 120
3	1955–1959	Menachem Begin	45 / 120
4	1959–1961	Menachem Begin	43 / 120
5	1961–1965	Menachem Begin	52 / 120
6	1965–1969	Menachem Begin	48 / 120
7	1969–1974	Menachem Begin	50 / 120
8	1974–1977	Menachem Begin	58 / 120
9	1977–1981	Menachem Begin	63 / 120
10	1981–1984	Menachem Begin, Yitzhak Shamir	64 / 120
11	1984–1988	Yitzhak Shamir	60 / 120
12	1988–1992	Yitzhak Shamir	65 / 120
13	1992–1996	Yitzhak Shamir, Benjamin Netanyahu	59 / 120
14	1996–1999	Benjamin Netanyahu	64 / 120
15	1999–2003	Benjamin Netanyahu, Ariel Sharon	60 / 120
16	2003–2006	Ariel Sharon	69 / 120
17	2006–2009	Benjamin Netanyahu	50 / 120
18	2009–2013	Benjamin Netanyahu	65 / 120
19	2013–2015	Benjamin Netanyahu	61 / 120
20	2015–2019	Benjamin Netanyahu	67 / 120
21	2019–2019	Benjamin Netanyahu	65 / 120
22	2019–2020	Benjamin Netanyahu	55 / 120
23	2020–2021	Benjamin Netanyahu	58 / 120
24	2021–2022	Benjamin Netanyahu	52 / 120
26	2022–2026	Benjamin Netanyahu	64 / 120
26	2026–present	Benjamin Netanyahu	53 / 120
