= Ministry for Community Empowerment and Advancement =

Government ministry of Israel

Ministry of Community Empowerment and Advancement
- המשרד לחיזוק וקידום קהילתי

Agency overview
- Formed: 14 May 2020
- Jurisdiction: Government of Israel
- Headquarters: Jerusalem
- Annual budget: 20 Million NIS
- Minister responsible: Omer Bar-Lev, Minister of Community Empowerment and Advancement
- Child agency: Israel Anti-Drug Authority

The Ministry of Community Empowerment and Advancement (Hebrew: המִשְׂרַד לחיזוק וקידום קהילתי, Ha-Misrad LeHizuk V'Kidum Kehilati) of the government of Israel, is the governmental department responsible for Communal Development in the State of Israel.

== History ==
The Ministry was established in May 2020 during the negotiations to form a new government after the election to Knesset. The Ministry oversees the work of the Anti-Violence and Anti-Drug Authority, the National Child Protection Network, a City Without Violence project and various projects to strengthen the Arab sector. Its political head is the Community Empowerment and Advancement Minister of Israel, and its offices are located in Jerusalem.

== List of ministers ==
| # | Minister | Party | Governments | Term start | Term end |
|---|---|---|---|---|---|
| 1 | Orly Levy-Abekasis | Gesher | 35 | 14 May 2020 | 13 June 2021 |
| 2 | Omer Bar-Lev | Labor | 36 | 13 June 2021 | Incumbent |
