= 2018–2022 Israeli political crisis =

Political crisis in Israel

- Part of the politics of Israel
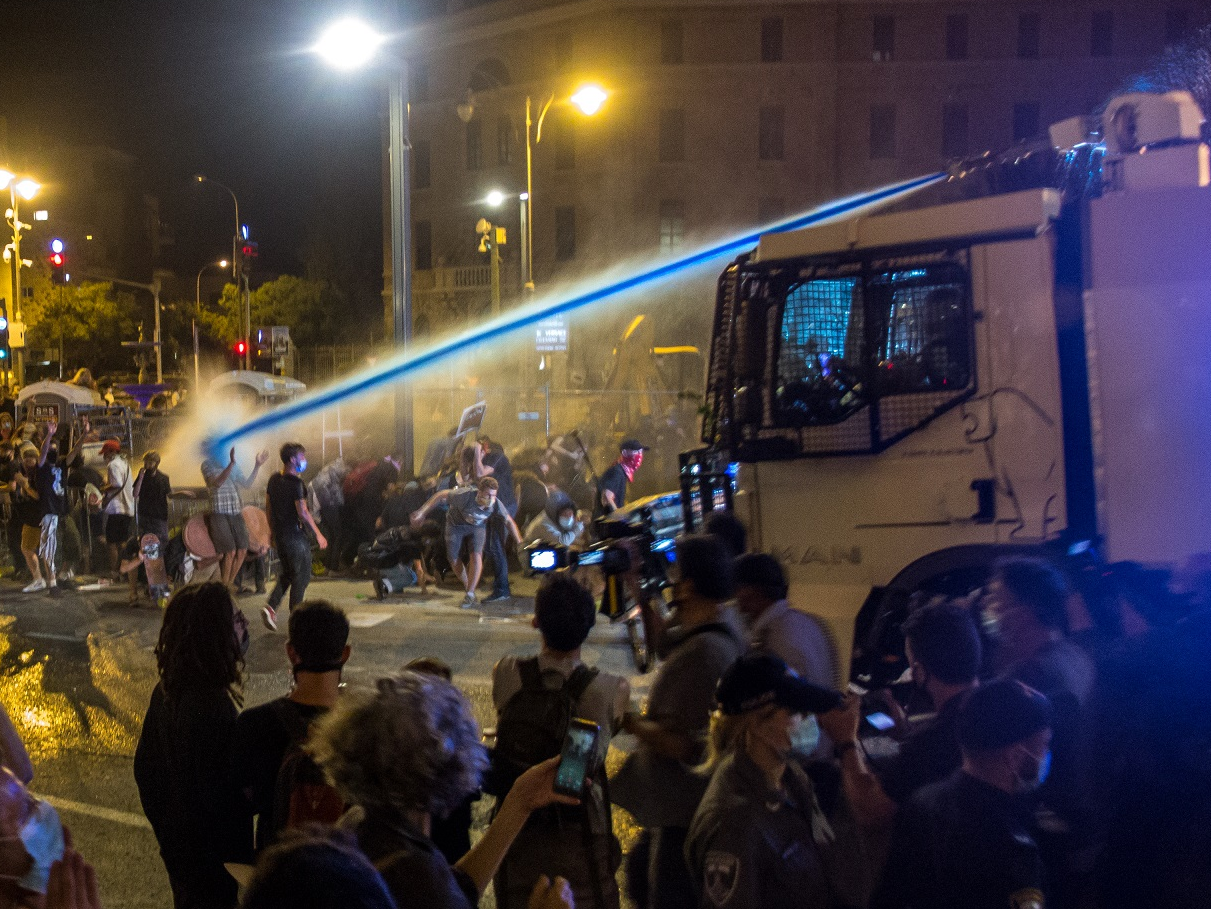
- A water cannon (with blue-dyed water) being used against protesters during the anti-Netanyahu protests in July 2020
- Date: 26 December 2018 – 29 December 2022 (4 years and 3 days)
- Location: Israel
- Type: Political crisis
- Cause: Difficulties in forming and retaining a stable majority governing coalition
- Outcome: Netanyahu-bloc victory: Five snap elections called the during political crisis; Fall of the 35th and 36th governments; Victory of the Netanyahu supporters in the election of the 25th Knesset and formation of the 37th government

The 2018–2022 Israeli political crisis was a period of political instability in Israel, in which five Knesset elections were held in a span of over three years: in April 2019, September 2019, March 2020, March 2021 and November 2022.

In the early phases of the crisis, the popular phrasing of the core division within the parties and the public was "only Bibi" (Hebrew: רק ביבי, romanized: Rak Bibi) or "anyone but Bibi" (Hebrew: רק לא ביבי, romanized: Rak lo Bibi). This stalemate was created due to the refusal of the liberal wing of the parliament to form a coalition with Netanyahu, while the Likud party – the prominent party of the conservative wing – refused to remove Netanyahu from the party's leadership. The rest of the conservative-wing parties refused to form a coalition without Netanyahu and the Likud. None of the wings were able to form a coalition by themselves, due to the tie-breaking parliament seats held by the Arab parties. Some parliament members from Jewish parties (both wings) and Arab parties had considered the possibility of governmental cooperation to be out of the question.

The first two elections of the crisis in April and September 2019 failed to produce a governing coalition, and the third election in March 2020 led to a unity government led by Netanyahu and Benny Gantz, before it was dissolved in December of that year, triggering a fourth election in March 2021. The 2021 election resulted in the thirty-sixth government of Israel, a diverse coalition of parties with various ideologies that was led by Naftali Bennett and Yair Lapid, but it was dissolved in June 2022. A fifth election in November of that year saw the victory of the right-wing bloc, returning Netanyahu to lead the thirty-seventh government of Israel.

== Background ==
During the 20th Knesset, elected after the 2015 Israeli legislative election, Benjamin Netanyahu secured his fourth term in office as the head of the thirty-fourth government of Israel. On 26 May 2016, Yisrael Beiteinu joined the government, with 5 MKs, and Avigdor Lieberman was appointed Defense Minister in place of Moshe Ya'alon.

On 14 November 2018, Lieberman resigned from his position and from the coalition in protest at the government's approval of a ceasefire with Hamas after two days of clashes, thereby undermining the stability of the government. On 26 December, the law to dissolve the Knesset was approved, and the election campaign for the twenty-first Knesset began.

== April 2019 election ==
The crisis began after the elections of April 2019 left no party able to form a government. The two major parties, Blue and White and Likud, received an equal number of 35 seats. The Likud received a mandate from the president to attempt to form a government, but Netanyahu failed to arrange a majority coalition of 61 seats. Netanyahu's Likud and their supporting parties voted to dissolve the Knesset instead of letting the president give the mandate to another Knesset member.

== September 2019 election ==
A second election was held in September 2019. This time, Blue and White overcame the Likud by a single seat. Nonetheless, the Likud received the mandate from the president, after gaining the support of one Knesset member more than Blue and White. Netanyahu, again, failed to form a government. This time, the mandate passed to Benny Gantz, who also failed to achieve a majority. The President passed the mandate to the Knesset members for 21 days. After no other candidate was offered, the Knesset was dissolved.

== March 2020 election ==
In March 2020, the third election was held. This time, Likud gained more seats than Blue and White, but Gantz achieved more recommendations from potential allies in the Knesset and received the mandate from the president. Gantz nevertheless was unable to unite enough allies into a coalition. His bloc was still agreed to replace the Speaker of the Knesset. Following this, the former Knesset Speaker Yuli Edelstein refused to convene the plenary to vote on his replacement. His refusal created a constitutional crisis. The Movement for Quality Government in Israel appealed to the Supreme Court, which ordered Edelstein to convene the Knesset. Following this Edelstein resigned. Meanwhile, the COVID-19 pandemic in Israel worsened, which precipitated negotiations for a national emergency government. On 26 March, Gantz was sworn in as the new Knesset Speaker, with the support of the Likud party, causing a split in Blue and White. On 20 April, the Likud and Blue and White agreed on an equal unity government, which included a "rotation agreement" between Gantz and Netanyahu on the prime minister's chair. However, following a failed budgetary vote in December 2020, the government coalition collapsed, and a fourth election was called for 23 March 2021.

== March 2021 election ==
Israeli President Reuven Rivlin met with the heads of all political parties on 5 April 2021, and charged Netanyahu with forming the government the next day. Netanyahu had been given until the end of 4 May to form a government. Netanyahu failed to form a new government by the deadline. The next day, Rivlin entrusted Yair Lapid with the second mandate. On 9 May, it was reported that Lapid and Naftali Bennett had made major headway in the coalition talks. On 10 May, it was reported that plans were made to form a new government consisting of the current opposition, but that the Islamist Ra'am Party, which froze talks with both Lapid and Bennett in the wake of recent warfare in Gaza, still needed to pledge support for the Change bloc in order for the opposition MKs to secure a majority. In late May, Lapid secured the support from Blue and White, Labor Party, Yisrael Beiteinu, New Hope, and Meretz, with Yamina and Ra'am possibly giving support. On 30 May, Bennett announced in a televised address that Yamina would join a unity government with Lapid, after all but one Yamina MK agreed to back this decision.

On 2 June 2021, following negotiations with Lapid and Bennett, Ra'am leader Mansour Abbas signed a document tethering his party to the coalition, and agreed to allow his party to join a non-Netanyahu government. Just an hour before his 2 June mandate was set to expire, Lapid informed outgoing president Reuven Rivlin that he could form a new government. On 11 June, Bennett's Yamina party became the last opposition faction to sign a coalition agreement with Lapid's Yesh Atid party, thus allowing the thirty-sixth government of Israel to be sworn in on 13 June, with Bennett becoming the Prime Minister and Lapid becoming the Alternate Prime Minister. The 2021–2022 state budget was passed on 5 November under this government.

On 6 April 2022, less than a year after the government was sworn in, MK Idit Silman of the Yamina party announced her withdrawal from the coalition, becoming the second of Yamina's seven elected MKs to join the opposition after Amichai Chikli, who had earlier voted against the government in its swearing. Silman's move cost the coalition its majority. MK Ghaida Rinawie Zoabi of the Meretz party initially resigned on 19 May, but reversed course and rejoined the coalition on 22 May. On 13 June, Nir Orbach left the coalition. On 20 June 2022, Bennett and Lapid announced that they would begin the process of dissolving the Knesset, citing the various crises the coalition had faced since its formation. The move thus led to a fifth election on 1 November. Lapid served as interim Prime Minister in the run-up to the election.

== November 2022 election ==
The fifth election in November 2022 saw the national camp win a majority of seats in the Knesset, likely returning Netanyahu to the post of Prime Minister and thus ending the deadlock. Increases in the number of MKs for Likud and the Religious Zionist Party was attributed to a lack of support for liberal wing and Arab parties, most notably the failure of Meretz to cross the electoral threshold to qualify for parliamentary representation. Following a two-month negotiation period, on 21 December, Netanyahu announced that he had succeeded in forming the new coalition. The thirty-seventh government of Israel was sworn in on 29 December.

Some of the government's policy proposals, including a flagship program centered around reforms in the judicial branch that was proposed in January 2023, drew widespread domestic and international criticism, sparking waves of protests across the country until October, when the Gaza war began. Due to the government's failure to anticipate the Hamas-led attack that initiated the war, Netanyahu has been heavily criticized for presiding over Israel's biggest intelligence failure in 50 years, and protests calling for his removal from office and new elections have been held.

== See also ==
- 2020s in political history
- Bulgarian political crisis (2021–2026)
- 2020–2022 Malaysian political crisis
