= Yair Golan =

Israeli politician (born 1962)

- יאיר גולן
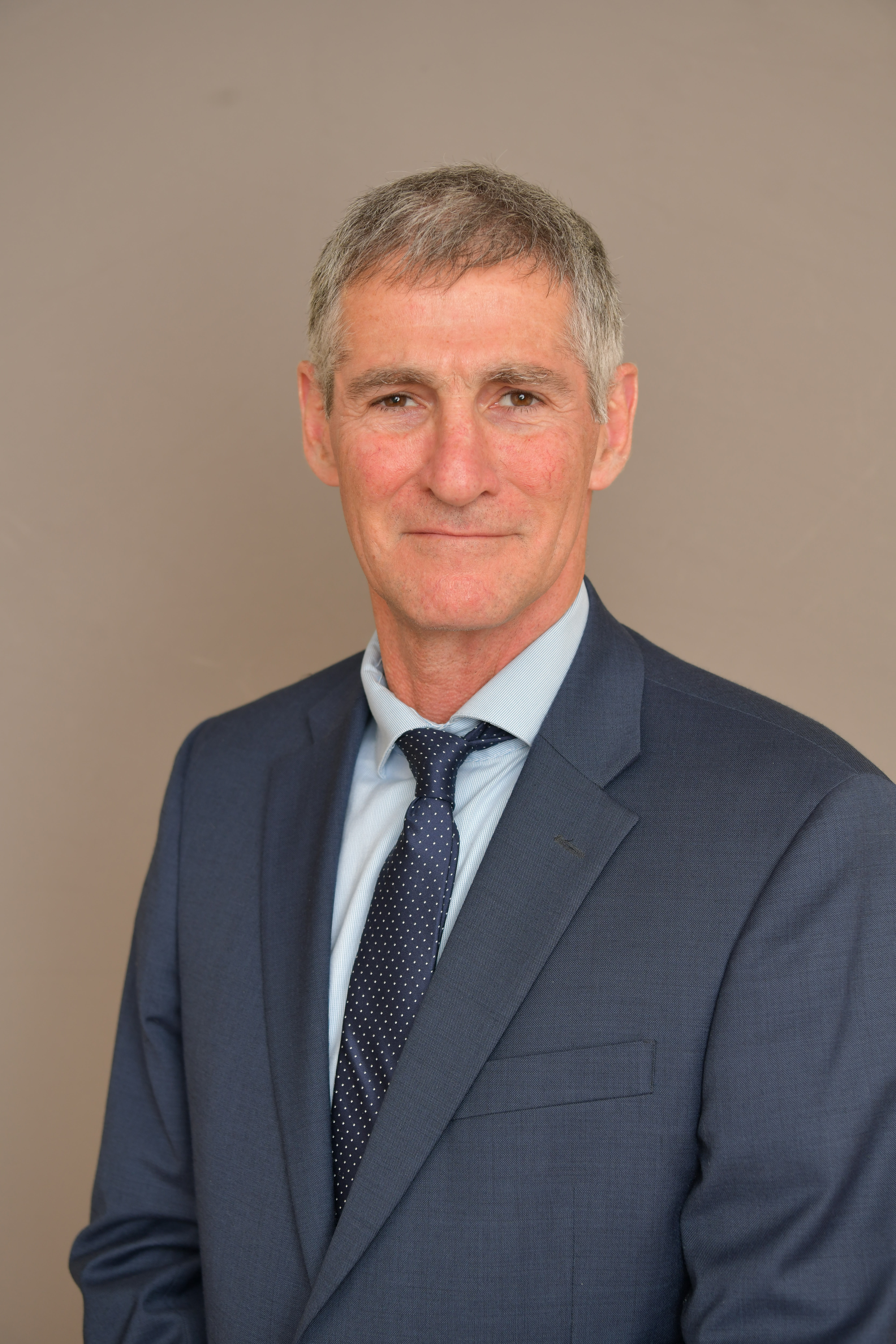
- Official portrait, 2021

Ministerial roles
- 2021–2022: Deputy Minister of Economy

Faction represented in the Knesset
- 2019–2020: Democratic Union
- 2020–2022: Meretz
- 2026–: Democrats

Other roles
- 2024: Leader of the Labor Party
- 2024–: Leader of The Democrats

Personal details
- Born: 14 May 1962 (age 64) Rishon LeZion, Israel
- Party: Democrats (since 2024)
- Other political affiliations: Israel Democratic Party (2019–2020); Democratic Choice (2020); Meretz (2020–2024); Labor Party (2024)
- Spouse: Ruthie
- Children: 5

Military service
- Allegiance: Israel
- Branch/service: Israel Defense Forces
- Years of service: 1980–2018, 2023
- Rank: Aluf (Major General)
- Commands: Nahal Brigade; Israeli 91st Division; Judea and Samaria Division; Israeli Home Front Command; Israeli Northern Command; Deputy Chief of Staff
- Battles/wars: 1982 Lebanon War; First Intifada; South Lebanon conflict (1985–2000); Second Intifada; Operation Defensive Shield; 2006 Lebanon War; Gaza War (2008-2009); 2012 Gaza War; Operation Brother's Keeper; 2014 Gaza War

Yair Golan (Hebrew: יָאִיר גּוֹלָן [jaˈʔiʁ goˈlan]; born 14 May 1962) is an Israeli politician serving as a member of the Knesset for The Democrats; he is the leader of the party, and a reserve major general in the Israel Defense Forces.

He served as the Deputy Minister of Economy in the thirty-sixth Israeli government, and served as a Member of the Knesset representing Meretz from 2019 to 2022. He is a reserve major general (Aluf) in the Israel Defense Forces. During his military service he served, among other roles, as the IDF Deputy Chief of Staff, Commander of the Home Front Command and Commander of the Northern Command.

In May 2024, Golan was elected leader of the Israeli Labor Party on a platform of merging the party with the rival left-wing party, Meretz. On 30 June 2024, the two parties announced an agreement to form a new party, The Democrats. The agreement, which designates Golan leader of the new party, was approved by both parties' congresses on 12 July 2024.

== Personal life and education ==
Golan was born and raised in Rishon LeZion. His father, Gershon Goldner, fled with his parents from Nazi Germany to Mandatory Palestine in 1935. His father served in the IDF and his last role was a senior technical assistant to the chief communications and electronics officer at the rank of lieutenant colonel (Sgan Aluf). His mother, Rachel, was born in Tel Aviv to Aryeh Rapoport, who emigrated from Ukraine in 1921, and Hana, born in moshav Nachalat Yehuda, now a part of Rishon LeZion. His elder brother is a Geography and History professor in the University of Haifa and his younger sister is a special-education teacher in the Shamir Medical Center.

Golan studied at Haviv Elementary School and "Yadlin" School in Rishon LeZion and Ort Singalovsky School in Tel Aviv. Golan was the head of the "nest council" (one rank above instructors) of Rishon LeZion in the leftist Labour Zionist youth movement HaNoar HaOved.

Golan holds a bachelor's degree in political science from Tel Aviv University, and a master's degree in public administration policy from Harvard University in the United States (joint program of the Wexner Foundation and the Kennedy School of Government).

Golan is married to Ruthie. He is a father to five children and resides in Rosh HaAyin.

== Military career ==
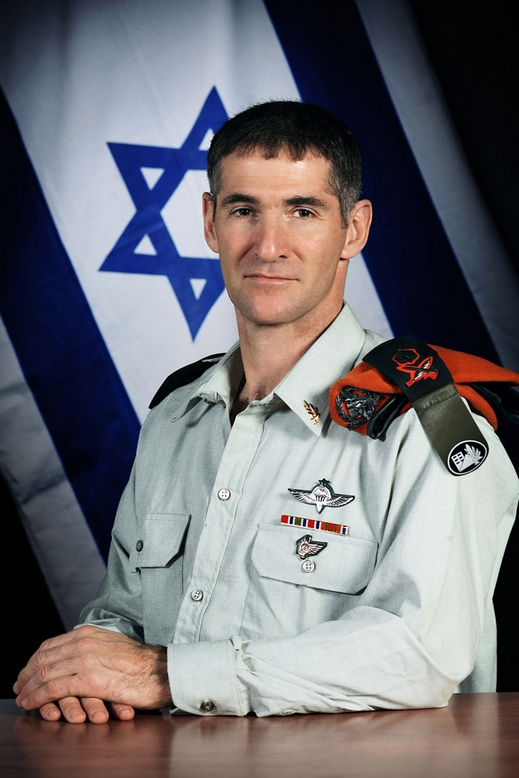
Golan as commander of the Home Front Command

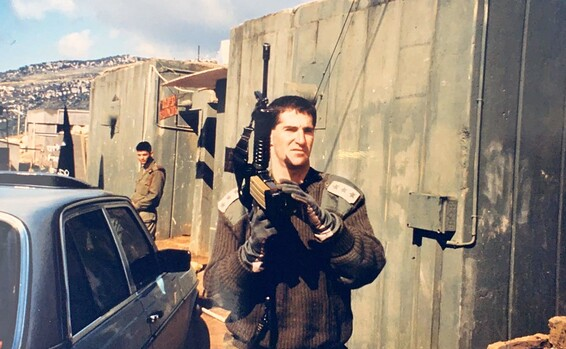
Yair Golan in Lebanon during his military service

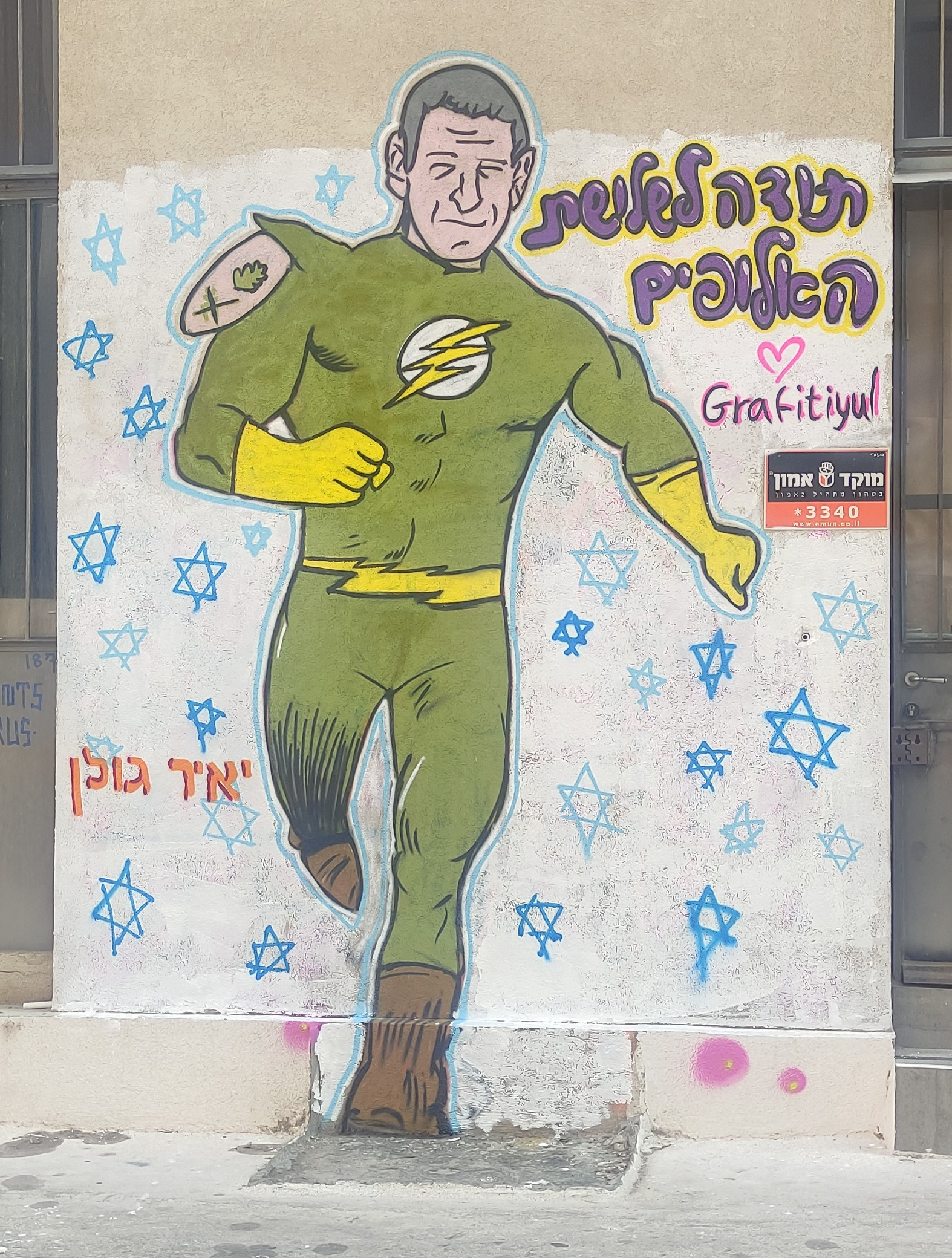
Street art of Yair Golan in honor of his heroism during the 2023 Hamas-led attack on Israel

Golan was drafted into the IDF in 1980. After successfully passing the flight academy acceptance tests, he decided to follow his brother's steps and volunteer for the paratrooper brigade instead. He served as a soldier and a squad leader and fought in the 1982 Lebanon War. After completing Officer Candidate School he became an infantry officer and returned to the Paratroopers Brigade as a platoon leader. Golan served as the commander of the Brigade's anti-tank company and led the 890 Paratroop Battalion in counter-guerrilla operations in the South Lebanon conflict and in the First Intifada. In 1993, he served as a Battalion Commander in IDF Officers' School and afterwards served as Judea and Samaria Division's Operations Branch Officer. Between the years 1996–1997 he commanded the Eastern brigade of Lebanon Liaison Unit and was injured in an encounter with a squad of Hezbollah militants. He then served as the head of the Operations section in the Operations Directorate. During the Second Intifada, Golan commanded the Nahal Infantry Brigade. Afterwards, he commanded the 91st Division and the Judea and Samaria Division.

From 2008 to 2011, Golan served as the Commander of Home Front Command, which he led through Operation Cast Lead. In July 2011, he served as the Commander of Israeli Northern Command, and in December 2014 as Deputy Chief of General Staff. According to Defense Minister Moshe Ya'alon, prior to Gadi Eisenkot's appointment as Chief of Staff in February 2015, Prime Minister Benjamin Netanyahu preferred Golan over Eisenkot; however, Eisenkot was chosen, and Golan continued in his role. Golan retired from active service in March 2018, after being replaced by Aluf Aviv Kochavi in May 2017.

Golan was a candidate for replacing Gadi Eisenkot, and discussions were held in 2018. There were strong objections from non-political parties due to his controversial statement during a Holocaust Day speech (see below). Defence Minister Avigdor Lieberman ended up choosing Aviv Kohavi over Golan.

On 7 October 2023, the day of the attack on Israel, Golan arrived as a civilian to the headquarters of the southern district of the Home Front Command, and asked its commander, Rafi Milo, to "re-enlist". He received a weapon and arrived in his private vehicle to the Gaza envelope, and rescued many survivors who were trapped in the area of the massacre at the Nature Festival near Re'im, using their phone locations. One of the people he rescued was the son of Haaretz journalist Nir Gontarz. He described what he saw as very difficult scenes and claimed that the battle of that day was the worst defeat of the State of Israel ever.

=== Holocaust Day speech ===
As Deputy Chief of Staff, Golan made a speech on Holocaust Day in 2016 in which some say he drew a parallel between Europe in general and Germany in particular in the 1930s and current day Israel, by saying "If there is one thing that is scary in remembering the Holocaust, it is noticing horrific processes which developed in Europe – particularly in Germany – 70, 80, and 90 years ago, and finding remnants of that here (in Israel) among us in the year 2016." He said that sometimes Israeli soldiers were harsh in dealing with Palestinians, and he highlighted the example of Sergeant Elor Azaria being tried over a Hebron shooting incident as evidence that the IDF investigates itself and has high moral standards. His comments drew significant criticism on social media, with Twitter users accusing Golan of "forgetting the lessons of the Holocaust". Netanyahu called the comments "outrageous" and said they "do injustice to Israeli society and create contempt for the Holocaust". Culture Minister Miri Regev called for his resignation, while opposition leader Isaac Herzog praised Golan for exhibiting "morality and responsibility".

Later, Golan retracted and said that he did not intend to compare Israel to Nazi Germany, releasing a statement in which he said: "It is an absurd and baseless comparison and I had no intention whatsoever to draw any sort of parallel or to criticize the national leadership. The IDF is a moral army that respects the rules of engagement and protects human dignity." In 2022, Golan stated that this incident is the reason he did not become Chief of Staff of the IDF, although he still agrees with his statements.

=== Use of human shields ===
On 18 October 2007, the IDF Chief of Staff initiated a disciplinary proceeding against then Brig. Gen. (Tat Aluf) Yair Golan, after a Military Police investigation into several cases where Golan used the "prior warning" procedure, which allowed IDF soldiers to use a relative or neighbor of a wanted person and force them to enter their house and ask them to turn themselves in. This procedure was outlawed by the Supreme Court in 2006, a decision that was also adopted by the IDF. In an interview on 31 July 2022, Golan stated: "The way I used the procedure reduced the danger posed on the IDF soldiers drastically, and I avoided confrontations that could've ended in the death of many Palestinians."

=== Awards and decorations ===
Yair Golan was awarded 4 campaign ribbons

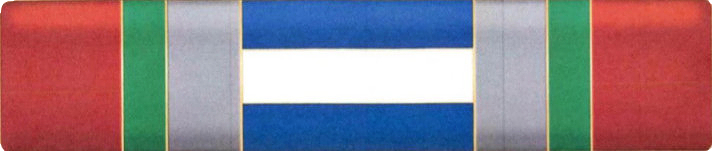

First Lebanon War	Second Lebanon War	South Lebanon Security Zone	Operation Protective Edge

== Political career ==
On 26 June 2019, Ehud Barak announced that Golan would join him in forming a new party called Israel Democratic Party which intended on challenging Netanyahu in the September 2019 Israeli legislative election. The party later joined the Democratic Union alliance to contest the September election. Golan was placed third on the list and served as a Member of the twenty-second Knesset. He re-activated the Democratic Choice party in January 2020, becoming its leader and joining the Democratic Union again in advance of the 2020 Israeli legislative election. In December 2020, Golan announced his accession to Meretz, and was elected to the twenty-fourth Knesset. He was appointed Deputy Minister of Economy under Orna Barbivai.

On 6 July 2022, he announced his candidacy for the leadership of the Meretz party ahead of the elections for the twenty-fifth Knesset. He lost to Zehava Gal-On, but was elected fourth in the list elections and placed fifth. He represented Meretz in the Knesset until the party failed to pass the electoral threshold in the 2022 legislative elections. On 26 February 2024, Golan announced he is prepared to take part in the Labor primary election on 28 May. He stated that his mission will be to "lead the Labor Party and lead to the unification of the liberal-democratic camp". On 28 May 2024, he won the Labor party primary election with 95% of the vote.

On 30 June 2024, Labor and Meretz announced an agreement to form a new party, The Democrats. The agreement, which designates Golan leader of the new party, was approved by both parties' congresses on 12 July 2024.

On 10 September 2026, Golan announced that he had filed a lawsuit for NIS 2.55 million against Sara Netanyahu, alleging she had defamed him by insinuating that he had had advance knowledge of the 7 October attacks.

=== Homesh incident ===
Homesh was an Israeli settlement that was evicted in the 2005 disengagement, but since then had constant illegal attempts to resettle it, and is a source of protest and violence in the West Bank. On 16 December 2021, Yehudah Dimentman, a resident of the nearby settlement, Shavei Shomron who was a student at the Homesh outpost yeshiva, was killed by a Palestinian shooter. In response to the attack, Homesh settlers attacked a man from the village of Burqa, damaged houses and desecrated graves. Golan said that: "Those people who come to settle there, riot in Burqa, destroy gravestones, committed a pogrom. Do we abuse gravestones? These are not people, these are subhumans, despicable people, the corruption of the Jewish people." The use of the phrase "subhuman" drew widespread criticism, and Golan conceded that it was an unfortunate expression made in the heat of the moment. In 2023, as a response to the Huwara rampage, Golan wrote on Twitter "They used to get angry with me when I said these people were subhuman. Today they are angry that I didn't say more."

=== Condemnation of the war in Gaza ===
In a radio interview on 20 May 2025, Golan stated regarding Israeli military action in Gaza that "A sane country does not wage war against civilians, does not kill babies as a pastime, and does not engage in mass population displacement". Prime Minister Netanyahu said in response that the comment was an "outrageous incitement against our heroic soldiers and against the State of Israel". Former Prime Minister Ehud Barak said Golan was "a brave, direct man" for condemning the Israeli government's management of the war.

Golan said in a further statement:

I said this morning that we are a sane country that does not kill children. When ministers in this government celebrate the death and starvation of children, we must say so. I was referring solely to the most failed government in Israel's history — not to the IDF. Our mission is to ensure that Israel remains a sane country that does not kill children either as a hobby or as a policy.

=== 2026 election ===
Two days before the 2026 Israeli legislative election, it was announced that Golan would receive state-funded personal security protection from a private security firm operating under the auspices of the Shin Bet after Golan had been the recipient of dozens of death threats. On the day of the election, The Democrats announced that a man had been arrested in Mesila Park, Tel Aviv, following an attempt to stab Golan. Police confirmed that a suspect with a knife had been arrested near Golan, but that there had not been a stabbing attempt. Speaking about the incident, Golan said it was "the direct result of the poison machine operated by” Prime Minister Benjamin Netanyahu “and his Qatari agents.” After polls had closed for the election, Golan said that he was “ready to work with all our partners” in order to form a government, but that he would not partner with any parties which had formed Netanyahu's governing coalition, saying that “The public has spoken, it has fired the Netanyahu government,” and that it was “a historic opportunity to establish a government of change in Israel, and we don’t intend to give it up.”

Speaking in an interview on Channel 12 on 30 October, Golan ruled out participation in a unity government that would include the Likud party, instead saying that the opposition parties could form a governing coalition that included Ra'am and with the cooperation outside of government of the Joint List. By 1 November, Golan, as the sole opposition member to embrace the idea of a government with Arab parties, specifically Ra'am, had met with Yousef Jabareen and Ahmad Tibi, as well as Mansour Abbas, to discuss cooperating in "coalition negotiations."

Following the questioning of the validity and integrity of the election results by Likud, and calls for an investigation by the Shin Bet, Golan criticised head of the Shin Bet David Zini, saying he had made the organisation into “a political tool in service of Netanyahu’s campaign to undermine the election results.”

== Political views ==
Golan defines himself as a leftist Zionist. When asked what event made Golan consider joining the Israeli political life, He said "in the 2015–2016 wave of violence and terror I see many cases where soldiers, regarding incidents... that are not dramatic incidents... incidents I've encountered a lot during my service, and they shoot. They shoot and kill. And I ask to be provided with all the investigations of every case where a Palestinian was killed, and I see event after event after event, where you say: Wait, this is not how a warrior behaves! And all this accumulation leads me to the feeling that something deep is amiss with us, firstly, it's distorted in the Israeli leadership, and after that, it distorts our perception within Israeli society. And this process of radicalization, of an inability to look at the other side and see even the enemy — as a human being, it's dangerous and destructive, and by the way, also harmful to the soldiers."

Golan has stated that he will fight against "corruption, the annexation of the West Bank, homophobia, and gender segregation". On climate activism, Golan tweeted "Israel's influence on the climate crisis is negligible. The preoccupation with the climate in Israel should be in the preparation of infrastructure for extreme heat waves and the protection of our nature reserves. Talking about climate as if Israel is a power, is talking in slogans instead of doing actions that directly affect the Israeli citizen." Golan has called on numerous occasions for the Israeli public to start "non-violent civil disobedience" (מרי אזרחי) in response to the 2023 Israeli judicial reform and the formation of the Thirty-seventh government of Israel.

=== Israeli–Palestinian conflict ===
Golan supports a two-state solution based on land swaps and the keeping of most settlement blocs. In a 2022 interview with Kan 11 Golan said "We need to return to the base. To go back to (the way of) Ben-Gurion, Rabin, Begin and Sharon. We need to separate. We need to say: Yes, we would've liked all of Eretz Israel, as it's the land of our ancestors, but we have no choice. In order to preserve the integrity of the nation, we must give up on the unity of the land. I don't see any other chance for the State of Israel."

Golan supports economic incentives in order to stabilize the hostilities in Gaza and to use military force if needed. As of August 2022, Golan was still supporting the 2005 Israeli disengagement from Gaza, saying "I believe that, no, we have nothing to find there. It's a crazy idea in my eyes, the establishment of a bloc of Jewish settlements between Khan Yunis and the sea is a dreadful and terrible thing". Although there are conflicting statements, Golan stated in August 2022 that the IDF is an "occupying military" but believes it is justified until peace is achieved. He has made statements against the BDS movement, saying that he believes it has anti-Semitic overtones, and that Israel has to "fight it to the bitter end".

=== Religion and state ===
Golan believes in complete separation of state and religion including the end of the "marriage monopoly" in Israel, allowing LGBTQ+ marriage and public transportation on Shabbat. In several interviews and statements, Golan heavily criticized the lack of secular education in Haredi schools.

=== Economy ===
Golan stated that he believes in "an economy that creates equal opportunities, that allows every young man and woman an open horizon thanks to proper education and proper infrastructure in the center and the periphery".

Political offices
Preceded by Merav Michaeli	Leader of the Israeli Labor Party; 28 May 2024–present	Incumbent
Preceded by none	Designated Leader of The Democrats; 30 June 2024–present	Incumbent
