= Makor Rishon =

Israeli weekly newspaper

- Type: Weekly newspaper
- Format: Broadsheet
- Owner: Israel Hayom
- Editor: Elad Tene
- Founded: 1997
- Language: Hebrew
- Country: Israel
- Website: makorrishon.co.il

Makor Rishon (Hebrew: מָקוֹר רִאשׁוֹן lit. "Firsthand Source") is a semi-major Israeli newspaper associated with Religious Zionism and the educated liberal-conservative right-wing.

== History ==
Makor Rishon was founded as a weekly magazine in July 1997 in order to create an independent newspaper with a Jewish religious and nationalistic slant. The paper was the brainchild of its original owner, Rabbi Shmuel Tal. The Listenberg family, a National Religious family in the diamond business based in Belgium and Tel Aviv, financed the founding of the newspaper. Journalist Meir Uziel was hired to recruit the staff. Uziel enlisted Michael Ruzulio to find writers. Ruzulio had served as a reporter for Yedioth Ahronoth as well as for the Second Authority for Television and Radio, and helped create the "Voice of the Red Sea" radio station. The newsroom was established in the "Pirsum Yisrael" offices located in Givat Shaul in Jerusalem and included religious and secular journalists and editors.

The majority of the newspaper's editors in its early years were secular and included Meir Uziel, Michael Ruzulio, Yehuda Levi (journalist) and Ofer Shapira.

Earnings from the paper were low and its financial situation worsened. The paper closed down at the end of October 1999, after which the owners filed for bankruptcy.

Makor Rishon was reestablished after five weeks, in December 1999, under the auspices of a company named "The New Makor Rishon" – a move that enabled its purchaser, Michael Karish, to derive benefit from the newspaper's name without having to be burdened by past debts. Karish worked to broaden the subscriber base and to make the paper financially viable. Over the course of 2003, the paper was purchased by businessman Shlomo Ben-Tzvi. After the buyout, changes were made that included a significant increase in the number of pages and journalists as well as a move to a broadsheet newspaper format.

Until mid-2007, Makor Rishon was published as a weekly. On April 25, 2007, the HaTzofe daily was incorporated into Makor Rishon, which started appearing with the logo "Makor Rishon-HaTzofe". Shlomo Ben-Tzvi, who until then had been the newspaper's CEO, was appointed the editor-in-chief. Makor Rishon was then published as a daily for the next two years.

In November 2008, the newspaper entered into financial difficulties. The employees requested the court liquidate the assets of the paper. The newspaper dealt with the crises by drastically cutting content, raising prices, firing workers, and closing down its website and article archives, among other actions. Starting from June 2009, the paper returned to being a weekly. A reduced daily edition was distributed only to subscribers but was made available on the newspaper's website, and a weekend edition was also attainable at newsstands.

On February 16, 2012, the newspaper began distributing a free expanded edition at various locations throughout the country, that contained many references to the newspaper's flagship edition that is sold on weekends, a move intended to increase sales and subscribers for the Friday edition.

On March 9, 2014, Ben-Tzvi's request for a two-month injunction to halt bankruptcy proceedings against the Makor Rishon and Ma’ariv newspapers was approved by the court. On March 30, 2014, the Jerusalem District Court approved selling the newspaper to Israel Hayom for 14 million shekels. and Antitrust Commissioner David Gilo approved the sale one month later.

On September 23, 2014, the daily edition was printed for the last time. Starting from this date, only the weekend edition is published.

== Newspaper format ==
In the past, the newspaper had only included a main news section, a news journal and a weekly magazine, Diyukan, that also included a cultural supplement. After Shlomo Ben-Tzvi purchased the newspaper in 2003, new supplements began appearing, which culminated with the switch to a new format in May 2005. The newspaper has undergone frequent changes since Ben-Tzvi purchased it. In its current format, the paper includes eight sections:

- General News – news items; editorial articles; opinion columns; and finance, science, sports and local travel sections.
- Yoman (Journal) – a weekly current affairs supplement containing articles, interviews and personal columns. The regular sections are Amnon Lord's column "Neged Haruach"; a current events poetry column by Tzur Ehrlich; Adi Arbel's series of observations "Lo Actuali"; political journalist Sophia Ron-Moriah's column; Pazit Rabinah's section "Teivat Pandora" containing international affairs exposés; a satirical section "Brichat Hamochot" edited by Gidon Dukov; and a weekly in-depth article on Middle Eastern affairs by Mordechai Kider. Avinadav Vitkun and Ariel Kahana are among the regular contributors. The supplement's editor was Ori Elitzur. After his death in 2014, Chaggai Segal took over as editor, and his current news column which had been in Diyukan, was moved to the "Yoman".
- Diyukan (Portrait) – a magazine that includes personal interest stories, personal columns and various sections, including an automotive section by Edward Atler, a food column by Ori Melamed, a travelogue by Galit Dehan-Karlibach, a computer games section by Assi Tubia, a broadcast calendar, a crosswords section and a film review by Nachum Mochiach (which had been written in the past by Renanit Parshani, preceded by Yuval Rivlin). Orly Goldklang is the supplement's editor-in-chief. In the past, Goldklang had written, together with Maya Levenson, "Tzippornaim", a humor column, and today writes "Puzzle" on the first page. The magazine's regular writers include Yifat Ehrlich, David Chermetz, Rikki Rat, Tzur Ehrlich, and Elyashiv Reichner.
- Shabbat (Sabbath) – a supplement for Jewish philosophy, Judaism and literature, with an intellectual bent. The editor-in-chief is Elchanan Nir. The editor of the section for book review is Shmuel Faust.
- Motzash (Motza'ei Shabbat) – a life-style magazine that began appearing in 2011. The editor-in-chief is Elad Teneh. The editor is Ariel Shinbal.

=== Past supplements ===
- Tzedek (Justice) – news and commentaries in the fields of religious and secular law, edited by Yehuda Yifrach.

From January 1, 2005, until February 2006, the weekly "Hashavuon", a culture supplement that also contained a calendar for scheduled broadcasts and plays. Tamar Nesher-Rati was the editor-in-chief. The assistant editor was Shai Tzeler.

- Nashim (Women) – a supplement geared to women that began appearing in the summer of 2006 and is published bi-weekly. Limor Garzim-Magen is the editor. Before this supplement began there was a magazine, termed Pnei Isha, that was edited by Ronny Shuv, preceded by Ayelet Kedem.
- Otiot (Letters) – a magazine for children and teens. A joint venture started in 2011 by the merger of the Makor L’Yiladim supplement and the established Otiot magazine. The new magazine was initially called "Otiot L’Yiladim", after which it returned to being called "Otiot, a newspaper from Makor Rishon". The first edition of Makor L’Yiladim appeared on December 10, 2004. Its editors were Etti Elboim and Orit Zimmer. In previous years, a two-page children's section had appeared in the Diyukan supplement. In its final years, its editor was Ehud Maksimov. Among its writers were Shoshie Greenfield, Yoel Chait, Yossi Shachar and Avinadav Vitkon.
- Sukariot (Candies) – a newspaper for preschoolers, known as the sister paper to Otiot. Before the merger between the children's supplements of Makor Rishon and the newspapers from Otiot, Makor Rishon had published a supplement for preschoolers entitled "Anakim". The two supplements were unified but the name Sukariot remained.

At the start of the newspaper's switch to the new format, a vacation supplement was added, which became bi-weekly and was quickly cancelled.

In June 2006, several months after the cancellation of "Hashavuon", a bi-weekly section entitled "Shishi Yisraeli" was added, that was planned to become a weekly. It was a glossy supplement in a small format and contained articles on topics of current affairs. It was cancelled after around three months.

The Kalkala supplement edited by economist Eran Bar-Tal and the sports section edited by Dotan Malach were originally separate entities, but since August 3, 2012 have been incorporated into the Motzash magazine.

For a while, the newspaper published Shabbat Hagadol – an expanded Jewish philosophy supplement that appeared three times a year and was edited by Yoav Shurek. The paper also published Makori – a Shabbat pamphlet that was distributed free of charge in synagogues and contained condensed articles from the Makor Rishon newspaper and from other sections, but was canceled towards the end of 2010.

=== The Shabbat supplement ===
The newspaper's Shabbat supplement deals with the topics of Jewish philosophy, literature and Torah thought and has been in print since 2004. Yoav Shurek was the editor from its inception until 2012. The current editor is Rabbi Elchanan Nir, with Shmuel Faust for book reviews.

The Shabbat supplement combines Jewish content with articles on literature and the arts, in a format similar to Haaretz's "Culture and Literature" supplement. Shabbat deals with more extensive subject matter and is far longer than a regular literary supplement. It has 24 pages which has been the case for nearly all the years it has been in existence. The supplement is highly regarded and is considered a respectable platform where authors, poets, translators, researchers and Torah scholars can publish regularly. It also serves as a forum to publish short stories and poetry. The supplement's format has only undergone minor changes since its inception. The front page features a work of art (a drawing or a photograph) together with a quotation.

The supplement is published in a similar format as Maariv's culture supplement, entitled "Erev Shabbat", which contains exclusive material including weekly columns by Dov Elboim and Yair Sheleg.

The sections in the supplement are: a regular column on the weekly Torah portion whose author changes from Chumash to Chumash; "Arachim from a Jewish Lexicon" by Professor Shalom Rosenberg; a poetry review by Yonatan Berg, a music review by Amichai Chasson; Chayuta Deutsch's column "Lipnai U’lifnim"; "B’safa Acheret" – a monthly overview of periodicals from around the world by Zeev Shpeidel; "Yashan Mipnei Chadash", a book column by Admiel Kosman; and a section dealing with rabbinic leaders in Jewish communities around the world written by Rabbi Eliyahu Birenbaum.

== Exclusives ==
The newspaper claims several exclusives to its credit, such as exposing the non-profit organizations affair in which Ehud Barak was involved during the 1999 general Israeli elections, and election fraud accusations made during the Labor party primaries that year that led to MK Ediso Masalah’s defeat.

== NRG360 ==
NRG360 (previously "nrg") was one of the major Israeli news sites, which was owned by the Israel Hayom group and operated in cooperation with Makor Rishon. The site was founded by Maariv Holdings, the parent company of Maariv, and until 2014 was called "NRG Maariv". In 2014, the site was sold to the Israel Hayom group and changed its name to "nrg". In 2017, the site's name was changed to NRG360. On January 10, 2018, the site was closed, and the contents accumulated during the years of its operation were transferred to the website of Makor Rishon.

== See also ==
- Media of Israel
- Maariv (newspaper)
