= Israel Democratic Party =

Political party in Israel

Israel Democratic Party ישראל דמוקרטית
- Leader: Ehud Barak
- Founded: 26 June 2019
- Preceded by: Independence Party
- Ideology: Liberal Zionism; Social liberalism
- Political position: Centre-left
- National affiliation: Democratic Union (2019–2020)
- Colours
- Slogan: State of Netanyahu or State of Israel?
- Most MKs: 1 (2019)
- Knesset: 0 / 120

Website
- www.dem.co.il

The Israel Democratic Party (Hebrew: ישראל דמוקרטית, romanized: Yisrael Demokratit, lit. 'Democratic Israel') was a political party in Israel established in 2019 by former prime minister Ehud Barak. The party merged with Meretz for the September 2019 election. It did not contest the 2020 snap election.

== Members ==
Yair Golan, Yifat Bitton, and Kobi Richter were alongside Barak when he announced on 26 June 2019 that he was forming a new party. Other people who have joined Barak's party include Yair Fink, who previously was a candidate for the Israeli Labor Party, in addition to Eldad Yaniv (another Labor member, Emilie Moatti, was rumored to join, but denied the rumor). The granddaughter of Yitzhak Rabin, Noa Rothman, has joined as well. Former Jewish Home member Sagit Peretz Deri joined on 2 July.

== Commitments ==
The party has made four major commitments that they will fulfill if elected:

1. The party committed to enacting a written constitution for Israel in the spirit of the values of the Declaration of Independence and the vision of the Biblical prophets of Israel within two years of the establishment of the government. The Constitution will enshrine equality, justice, social rights, and the Jewish right to this land. It will do this, while preserving the unity of the people and the rights of minorities, regardless of religion, race, gender, and sexual orientation. In addition, they will enshrine term limits and prevent those who have been indicted of a crime from serving in public office.
2. The party committed to establishing permanent borders for Israel within two years. This is to ensure the existence of Israel as a Jewish and democratic state, and to prevent the annexation of millions of Palestinians.
3. The party committed to rehabilitating Israel's social services. They will enact a free education law from the age of 0, and upwards, reduce the wait times for health care, and reduce the cost of living by 20% (by reducing the cost of land and making use of Israel's natural gas). These goals will be reached through an increase in public spending that will bring Israel to the average OECD level of public spending.
4. The party committed to allowing civil marriage and divorce in Israel, allowing public transportation on Shabbat, and increasing the salary of IDF soldiers.

== Leaders ==
Leader	Took office	Left office
Ehud Barak	2019	2019

== Election results ==
Election year	Coalition	Party Leader	# of overall votes	% of overall vote	# of overall seats won	+/-	Government
September 2019	Democratic Union	Ehud Barak	192,495	4.34% (as a part of the Democratic Union)	1 / 120	▲1	Snap election

== See also ==
- Opinion polling for the September 2019 Israeli legislative election
