= Orly Levy-Abekasis =

Israeli politician (born 1973)

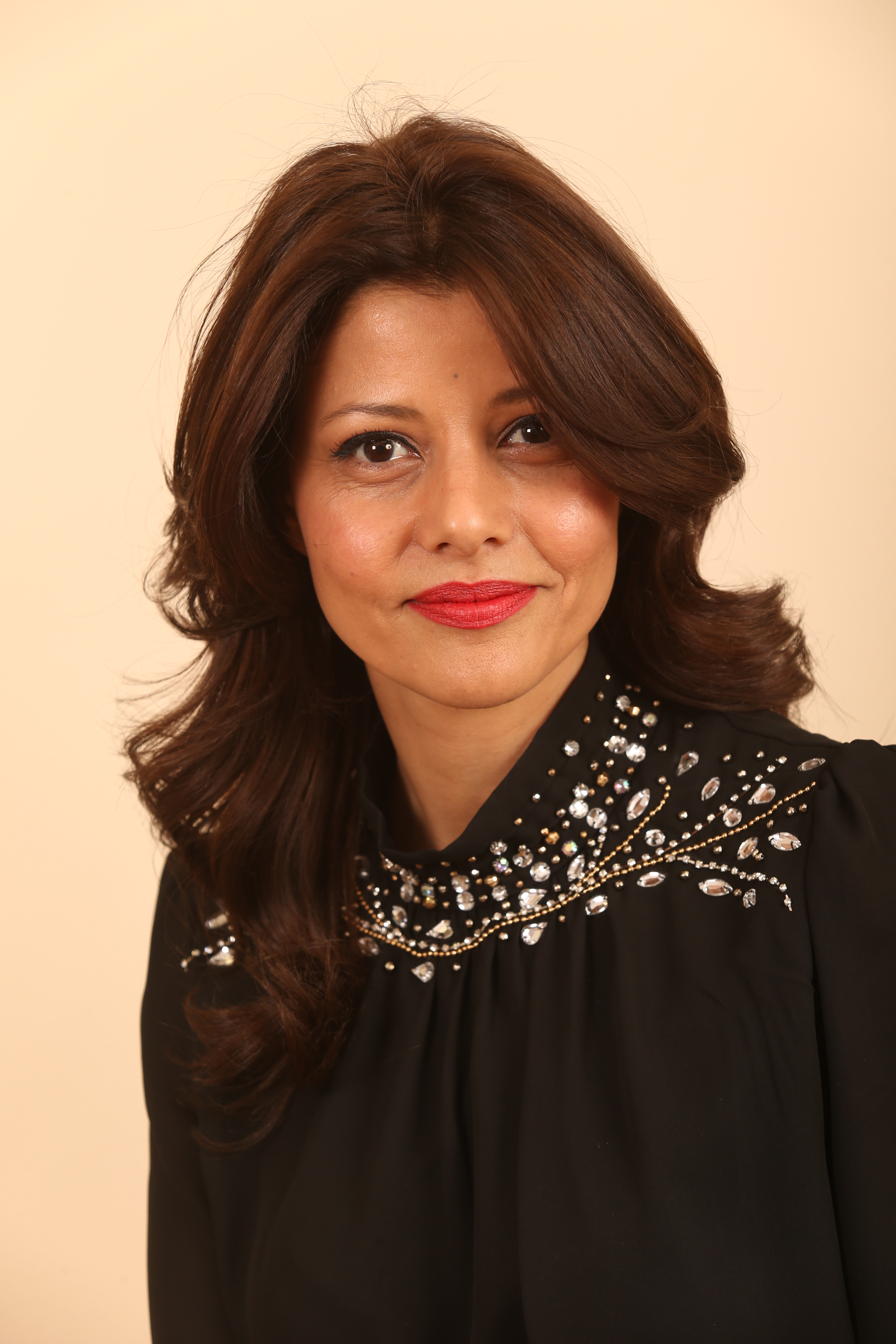
- Levy-Abekasis in 2015

Ministerial roles
- 2020–2021: Minister for Community Empowerment and Advancement

Faction represented in the Knesset
- 2009–2017: Yisrael Beiteinu
- 2017–2019: Independent
- 2019–2021: Gesher
- 2021–2022: Likud

Personal details
- Born: 11 November 1973 (age 52) Beit She'an, Israel

Orly Levy-Abekasis (Hebrew: אורלי לוי-אבקסיס; born 11 November 1973) is an Israeli politician and former member of the Knesset. Formerly a model, Levy-Abekasis first entered the Knesset in 2009 as a representative of Yisrael Beiteinu, but left the party in 2017 to sit as an independent. In 2019, she formed her own party, Gesher, to contest the April 2019 elections. Although the party failed to win a seat, she returned to the Knesset following the September 2019 elections, in which Gesher ran together with the Labor Party. In May 2020, she was appointed by Prime Minister Netanyahu as the newly created Minister for Community Empowerment and Advancement.

Levy-Abekasis worked as a model and a local television host, before following her father into politics. Levy-Abekasis's political views are primarily focused on social issues and issues of economic justice. Whilst a member of Yisrael Beiteinu, she was one of two governing coalition members to abstain from the controversial Nation State Law.

== Biography ==
Levy was born in Beit She'an, Israel, to a Moroccan Jewish family. She is the ninth of twelve children of former Foreign Affairs Minister David Levy. She did her military service in the Israeli Air Force, and later earned a law degree at the IDC Herzliya college.

She is married to Lior Abekasis. They have four children, and reside in kibbutz Mesilot. Her brother, Jackie, served as mayor of Beit She'an for the Likud.

== Political career ==
For the 2009 elections, Levy-Abekasis was placed sixth on the Yisrael Beiteinu list, and entered the Knesset after the party won fifteen seats. During her first term, she served as Deputy Speaker of the Knesset and Chair of the Committee on the Rights of the Child. For the 2013 elections, Levy-Abekasis was placed 16th on the Likud Yisrael Beiteinu list, and entered the Knesset after the party won 31 seats. She was re-appointed Chair of the Committee of the Rights of the Child. In January 2015, it was announced that she would be second on the Yisrael Beiteinu list for the March 2015 elections.

In May 2016, she announced she was quitting Yisrael Beiteinu due to the need for more attention to social affairs in the party's negotiations over joining the coalition government. She officially became an independent MK on 15 March 2017. Due to leaving Yisrael Beiteinu during a Knesset term, she was limited by Knesset protocol from running for the next elections. As a result, in March 2018, she announced plans to form a new party.

In December 2018, the party was named Gesher, reviving the name of the party founded by her father in 1996. In the April 2019 elections, the new party failed to cross the electoral threshold. However, after a failure to form a new government, the newly elected Knesset voted to dissolve itself in May 2019, and snap elections were called for September. On 18 July, Gesher agreed to form an electoral alliance with Labor, with Levy-Abekasis placed second on the joint list. She returned to the Knesset as the alliance won six seats.

In May 2020, she was made head of the newly created Ministry for Community Empowerment and Advancement after she signed a coalition deal with Likud.

For the 2021 elections, Levy-Abekasis was placed twenty-sixth on Likud's list and retained her seat in the Knesset, as Likud won thirty seats.

For the 2022 elections, Levy-Abekasis was placed fiftieth on Likud's list and lost her seat in the Knesset, as Likud won thirty-two seats.

== Media appearances ==
In 2023 Levy-Abekasis competed in the ninth season of Rokdim Im Kokhavim ('Dancing with the Stars'), in which she was the eleventh person eliminated (out of 18 couples).
