= Democratic Union (Israel) =

Left-wing political alliance in Israel

Democratic Union המחנה הדמוקרטי
- Leader: Nitzan Horowitz; Stav Shaffir; Yair Golan; Ehud Barak
- Founded: 25 July 2019
- Dissolved: 13 January 2020
- Succeeded by: Labor-Gesher-Meretz
- Ideology: Progressivism; Social democracy Green politics Democratic socialism Secularism; Labor Zionism
- Political position: Centre-left to left-wing
- Member parties: Meretz; Democratic Choice; Israel Democratic
- Colours
- Slogan: No (to) Likud. That's for sure.
- Most MKs: 5 (2019)

Election symbol
- מרצ

Website
- www.dem.co.il

The Democratic Union (Hebrew: המחנה הדמוקרטי, romanized: HaMaḥaneh HaDemokrati, lit. 'The Democratic Camp') was a left-wing political alliance in Israel formed between Meretz, Israel Democratic Party, Labor defector Stav Shaffir, and the Green Movement that ran in the September 2019 Israeli legislative election. On 19 December 2019, Labor defector Stav Shaffir and her party, the Green Movement, announced a press conference in which she would leave the alliance to run independently in the 2020 Israeli legislative election. The Democratic Union initially announced on 7 January 2020 that it would run in the 2020 election, this time including Meretz and Democratic Choice.

On 13 January 2020, it was announced that a new Labor-Gesher-Meretz slate had been formed for the 2020 election, excluding Shaffir, but including Yair Golan in a reserved Meretz slot.

== History ==
A meeting was held between Ehud Barak and Issawi Frej (with Stav Shaffir "mediating") on 24 July to make various agreements between their respective factions, with Barak allowing Meretz leader Nitzan Horowitz first place on the list, as well as Barak being placed in tenth place on the list, but with "first pick of portfolios" if the alliance were to go into government. The Meretz party voted on 28 July to approve the agreement regarding the Democratic Union.

The agreement bound the parties not to join a coalition with a right-wing government, declaring: "We will not lend our hand to a right-wing government headed by Netanyahu, and not a right-wing government headed by the puppets of Netanyahu in any situation, in any scenario, in any way." The parties also pledged to "defend the democratic character of the state, with an emphasis on the Supreme Court, to abolish the Nation-state Law, and to promote peace and a political settlement with the Palestinian Arabs".

== Composition ==
=== Former members ===
None of the parties presently have seats in the Knesset. Meretz merged into The Democrats in 2024, a party led by Yair Golan, who was elected as the Labor Party leader on a platform of merging with Meretz. Democratic Choice and Democratic Israel disbanded shortly after the end of the Democratic Union.

Name	Ideology	Position	Leader
Meretz	Progressivism	Left-wing	Nitzan Horowitz
Democratic Choice	Social democracy	Centre-left	Yair Golan
Democratic Israel	Social liberalism	Centre-left	Ehud Barak
Green Party	Green politics	Centre-left to left-wing	Stav Shaffir

== Former MKs ==
The Democratic Union had five members in the 22nd Knesset.

Meretz, Israel Democratic, Green Movement

#	Name	Notes
1	Nitzan Horowitz	Democratic Union leader, Meretz chairman, journalist
2	Stav Shaffir	Former Labor MK, a leader from the 2011 Israeli social justice protests
3	Yair Golan	Former Deputy Chief of Staff
4	Tamar Zandberg	Former Meretz Chairwoman
5	Ilan Gilon	Meretz MK, former Deputy mayor of Ashdod

== Election results ==
Election	Leader	Votes	%	Position	Seats	+/–	Outcome
September 2019	Nitzan Horowitz	192,495	4.34%	9th	5 / 120	n/a	Snap election
