= Gesher (2019 political party) =

Political party in Israel

Gesher גשר
- Leader: Orly Levy
- Founded: 25 December 2018
- Split from: Yisrael Beiteinu
- Preceded by: Gesher National Social Movement
- Merged into: Likud
- Ideology: Liberal Zionism; Social liberalism; Two-state solution; Liberal feminism
- Political position: Centre
- National affiliation: Likud (2021)
- Colours: Dark Blue; Pink
- Most MKs: 1 (2019–2021)

Election symbol
- נר

Website
- gesherparty.co.il (defunct), archived April 2019

Gesher (Hebrew: גשר, lit. Bridge) was a liberal Zionist, social liberal, and centrist political party in Israel, established in December 2018 by former Yisrael Beiteinu MK Orly Levy. The party focused primarily on economic and cost-of-living issues. The name of the party is a reference to the party founded by Orly's father, David Levy.

== History ==
Levy served on behalf of the Yisrael Beiteinu party during the 20th Knesset, but withdrew from the party after it joined the 34th government, because she did not receive a ministerial position despite her high ranking on Yisrael Beitenu's list. At first, she remained officially a part of the party, but later was removed from the party and remained a member of the Knesset. Levy was recognized as an independent member of the Knesset, not a member of the coalition, but in the opposition. In March 2017 Levy announced her intention to establish a new party for the elections.

Gesher was founded in December 2018, a few days after the April 2019 election was called. The party attempted to run on a joint list with Benny Gantz's Israel Resilience Party, but after negotiations failed, the party declared it would run alone.

On 18 July 2019, ahead of the September 2019 election, the party agreed to form an electoral alliance with the Labor party.

For the 2020 March elections, Gesher-Labor unified with Meretz in light of worries that neither party would pass the 3.25% threshold needed to enter the Knesset. Many Gesher voters were surprised at this merger, because when it came to the politics of the Arab–Israeli conflict, Gesher was seen as more of a centre-right party, while Meretz is a left-wing party. On 17 March 2020, Levy requested that she be allowed to withdraw her party from its alliance with Labor and Meretz. The Arrangements Committee approved the split on 23 March. In the following election in 2021, Orly Levy ran as part of the Likud list after the party gave her the 26th spot and went on to retain a seat in the Knesset.

== Leaders ==
Leader	Took office	Left office
Orly Levy	2018	Incumbent

== Election results ==
Election year	Party leader	# of overall votes	% of overall vote	# of seats won	+/-	Government
April 2019	Orly Levy	74,701	1.73 (#14)	0 / 120	New party	Extraparliamentary
September 2019	Orly Levy	Part of Labor-Gesher		1 / 120	▲1	Snap election
2020	Orly Levy	Part of Labor-Gesher-Meretz		1 / 120	0	In coalition

== See also ==
- Liberalism in Israel
