= Party lists for the September 2019 Israeli legislative election =

The September 2019 Israeli legislative election was held using closed list proportional representation. Each party presented a list of candidates to the Central Elections Committee prior to the election.

== Blue and White ==
The Blue and White list, headed by Benny Gantz and Yair Lapid; the list (up to the 30th slot) remained the same as in the April election.

1. Benny Gantz (Israel Resilience)
2. Yair Lapid (Yesh Atid)
3. Moshe Ya'alon (Telem)
4. Gabi Ashkenazi (Israel Resilience)
5. Avi Nissenkorn (Israel Resilience)
6. Meir Cohen (Yesh Atid)
7. Miki Haimovich (Israel Resilience)
8. Ofer Shelah (Yesh Atid)
9. Yoaz Hendel (Telem)
10. Orna Barbivai (Yesh Atid)
11. Michael Biton (Israel Resilience)
12. Hili Tropper (Israel Resilience)
13. Yael German (Yesh Atid)
14. Zvi Hauser (Telem)
15. Orit Farkash-Hacohen (Israel Resilience)
16. Karin Elharar (Yesh Atid)
17. Meirav Cohen (Israel Resilience)
18. Yoel Razvozov (Yesh Atid)
19. Asaf Zamir (Israel Resilience)
20. Yizhar Shai (Israel Resilience)
21. Elazar Stern (Yesh Atid)
22. Mickey Levy (Yesh Atid)
23. Omer Yankelevich (Israel Resilience)
24. Pnina Tamano-Shata (Yesh Atid)
25. Gadeer Mreeh (Israel Resilience)
26. Ram Ben Barak (Yesh Atid)
27. Alon Shuster (Israel Resilience)
28. Yoav Segalovitz (Yesh Atid)
29. Ram Shefa (Israel Resilience)
30. Boaz Toporovsky (Yesh Atid)
31. Orly Fruman (Telem)
32. Eitan Ginzburg (Israel Resilience)
33. Gadi Yevarkan (Telem)
34. Idan Roll (Yesh Atid)
35. Yorai Lahav-Hertzanu (Yesh Atid)
36. Moshe Matalon (Telem)

== Democratic Union ==
The Democratic Union list, headed by Nitzan Horowitz.

1. Nitzan Horowitz (Meretz)
2. Stav Shaffir (Green Movement)
3. Yair Golan (Israel Democratic Party)
4. Tamar Zandberg (Meretz)
5. Ilan Gilon (Meretz)
6. Issawi Frej (Meretz)
7. Yifat Bitton (Israel Democratic Party)
8. Yael Cohen Paran (Green Movement)
9. Noa Rotman (Israel Democratic Party)
10. Ehud Barak (Israel Democratic Party)
11. Gilad Kariv (Green Movement)
12. Mossi Raz (Meretz)
13. Michal Rozin (Meretz)
14. Yaya Fink (Israel Democratic Party)
15. Smadar Shmueli (Israel Democratic Party)

== Joint List ==
The Joint List, headed by Ayman Odeh.

1. Ayman Odeh (Hadash)
2. Mtanes Shehadeh (Balad)
3. Ahmad Tibi (Ta'al)
4. Mansour Abbas (United Arab List)
5. Aida Touma-Suleiman (Hadash)
6. Walid Taha (United Arab List)
7. Ofer Cassif (Hadash)
8. Heba Yazbak (Balad)
9. Osama Saadi (Ta'al)
10. Yousef Jabareen (Hadash)
11. Said al-Harumi (United Arab List)
12. Jabar Asatra (Hadash)
13. Sami Abu Shehadeh (Balad)

== Labor-Gesher ==
The Labor-Gesher list, headed by Amir Peretz.

1. Amir Peretz (Labor)
2. Orly Levy (Gesher)
3. Itzik Shmuli (Labor)
4. Merav Michaeli (Labor)
5. Omer Bar-Lev (Labor)
6. Revital Swid (Labor)
7. Hagai Reznik (Gesher)
8. Eran Hermoni (Labor)
9. Saleh Saad (Labor)
10. Carmen Elmakiyes (Gesher)

== Likud ==
The Likud list, headed by Prime Minister Benjamin Netanyahu.

1. Benjamin Netanyahu
2. Yuli Edelstein
3. Yisrael Katz
4. Gilad Erdan
5. Moshe Kahlon
6. Gideon Sa'ar
7. Miri Regev
8. Yariv Levin
9. Yoav Gallant
10. Nir Barkat
11. Gila Gamliel
12. Avi Dichter
13. Ze'ev Elkin
14. Haim Katz
15. Eli Cohen
16. Tzachi Hanegbi
17. Ofir Akunis
18. Yuval Steinitz
19. Tzipi Hotovely
20. Dudi Amsalem
21. Amir Ohana
22. Ofir Katz
23. Eti Atiya
24. Yoav Kish
25. David Bitan
26. Keren Barak
27. Shlomo Karhi
28. Miki Zohar
29. Yifat Shasha-Biton
30. Sharren Haskel
31. Michal Shir
32. Keti Shitrit
33. Fateen Mulla
34. May Golan
35. Tali Ploskov
36. Uzi Dayan
37. Ariel Kellner
38. Osnat Mark

== Otzma Yehudit ==
The Otzma Yehudit list, headed by Itamar Ben-Gvir. Baruch Marzel and Ben-Zion Gopstein were barred from running on 25 August 2019 by the Supreme Court of Israel.

1. Itamar Ben-Gvir
2. Adva Biton
3. Yitzhak Wasserlauf
4. Meir David Cooperschmidt

== Shas ==
The Shas list, headed by Minister of the Interior Aryeh Deri.

1. Aryeh Deri
2. Yitzhak Cohen
3. Meshulam Nahari
4. Ya'akov Margi
5. Yoav Ben-Tzur
6. Michael Malchieli
7. Moshe Arbel
8. Yinon Azulai
9. Moshe Abutbul

== United Torah Judaism ==
The United Torah Judaism list represented the Agudat Yisrael and Degel HaTorah parties, which have run jointly since 1992. The list, headed by Yaakov Litzman, was identical to the April 2019 list.

1. Yaakov Litzman (Agudat Yisrael)
2. Moshe Gafni (Degel HaTorah)
3. Meir Porush (Agudat Yisrael)
4. Uri Maklev (Degel HaTorah)
5. Ya'akov Tessler (Agudat Yisrael)
6. Ya'akov Asher (Degel HaTorah)
7. Yisrael Eichler (Agudat Yisrael)
8. Yitzhak Pindros (Degel HaTorah)

== Yamina ==
The Yamina list, headed by Ayelet Shaked. It list was an alliance of the New Right and the Union of the Right-Wing Parties (URWP).

1. Ayelet Shaked (New Right)
2. Rafi Peretz (Jewish Home)
3. Bezalel Smotrich (National Union–Tkuma)
4. Naftali Bennett (New Right)
5. Moti Yogev (Jewish Home)
6. Ofir Sofer (National Union–Tkuma)
7. Matan Kahana (New Right)
8. Idit Silman (Jewish Home)
9. Roni Sassover (New Right)
10. Orit Strook (National Union–Tkuma)
11. Shai Maimon (New Right)
12. Shuli Mualem (New Right)
13. Eli Ben-Dahan (Jewish Home)

== Yisrael Beiteinu ==
The Yisrael Beiteinu list, headed by Avigdor Lieberman.

1. Avigdor Lieberman
2. Oded Forer
3. Evgeny Sova
4. Eli Avidar
5. Yulia Malinovsky
6. Hamad Amar
7. Alex Kushnir
8. Mark Ifraimov
9. Limor Magen Telem
10. Elina Bardach-Yalov

== Zehut (withdrawn) ==
The Zehut list, headed by Moshe Feiglin, though Feiglin announced on 29 August that it would pull out of the race in return for a ministerial position and a push for the legalization of medical cannabis, pending a ratification of the agreement by Zehut members, which was approved on 1 September. On 3 September, the entire Zehut list withdrew from the elections, effectively eliminating the party's candidacy.

1. Moshe Feiglin
2. Gilad Alper
3. Ronit Dror
4. Arkady Muter

== Minor parties ==
Minor parties in the order in which they registered with the Central Elections Committee.

- The Da'am: Green Economy – One State (דעם - כלכלה ירוקה מדינה אחת)
- Social Leadership (מנהיגות חברתית)
- Economic Power (עוצמה כלכלית קולם של העסקים בישראל)
- Zechuyoteinu Bekoleinu ("Our Rights Are in Our Vote/Voice") (זכויותנו בקולנו - לחיים בכבוד)
- Uncorrupted Red White (אדום לבן - לגליזציה לקנביס, שוויון לאתיופים, ערבים ומקופחים)
- Pirate Party (הפיראטים - כי כולנו באותה סירה והכל אותו שייט)
- Mitkademet (מתקדמת)
- The Gush Hatanachi (Bible Bloc) (מפלגת הגוש התנ"כי)
- Justice, headed by Avi Yalou (צדק בראשות אבי ילאו)
- Kama (קמ"ה - קידום מעמד הפרט)
- Kavod HaAdam (כבוד האדם)
- Respect and Equality (כבוד ושוויון)
- Democracy Party (מפלגת הדמוקראטורה)
- Noam (נעם - עם נורמלי בארצנו)
- Israel Brothers for Social Justice (כל ישראל אחים לשוויון חברתי)
- Seder Hadash (סדר חדש - לשינוי שיטת הבחירות)
- Popular Unity (האחדות העממית - אלוחדה אלשעביה בראשות פרופ' אסעד גאנם)
- Tzomet (צומת - התיישבות וחקלאות)
- Liberal Christian Movement (התנועה הנוצרית הליברלית)
- Secular Right (רון קובי - הימין החילוני נלחמים בכפייה החרדית)
- Tzafon (צפון)
