= List of members of the twenty-second Knesset =

Israel's legislatures

22nd Knesset
| ← | 21st | 23rd | → |

Overview
- Legislative body: Knesset
- Jurisdiction: Israel
- Meeting place: Knesset building
- Term: 3 October – 11 December 2019
- Election: 17 September 2019
- Government: None (snap election)

Knesset
- President: Reuven Rivlin
- Prime minister: Benjamin Netanyahu (caretaker)
- Speaker: Yuli Edelstein

The members of the 22nd Knesset were elected on 17 September 2019.

== Members of the Knesset ==
| Alliance | Party | Name |
|---|---|---|
| Blue and White (33) | Israel Resilience (15) | Benny Gantz • Gabi Ashkenazi • Avi Nissenkorn • Miki Haimovich • Michael Biton • Hili Tropper • Orit Farkash-Hacohen • Meirav Cohen • Asaf Zamir • Yizhar Shai • Omer Yankelevich • Gadeer Mreeh • Alon Schuster • Ram Shefa • Eitan Ginzburg |
| Blue and White (33) | Yesh Atid (13) | Yair Lapid • Meir Cohen • Ofer Shelah • Orna Barbivai • Yael German • Karin Elharar • Yoel Razvozov • Elazar Stern • Mickey Levy • Pnina Tamano-Shata • Ram Ben Barak • Yoav Segalovitz • Boaz Toporovsky |
| Blue and White (33) | Telem (5) | Moshe Ya'alon • Yoaz Hendel • Zvi Hauser • Orly Fruman • Gadi Yevarkan |
| Likud (32) | | Benjamin Netanyahu • Yuli Edelstein • Israel Katz • Gilad Erdan • Moshe Kahlon • Gideon Sa'ar • Miri Regev • Yariv Levin • Yoav Gallant • Nir Barkat • Gila Gamliel • Avi Dichter • Ze'ev Elkin • Haim Katz • Eli Cohen • Tzachi Hanegbi • Ofir Akunis • Yuval Steinitz • Tzipi Hotovely • Dudi Amsalem • Amir Ohana • Ofir Katz • Eti Atiya • Yoav Kisch • David Bitan • Keren Barak • Shlomo Karhi • Miki Zohar • Yifat Shasha-Biton • Sharren Haskel • Michal Shir • Keti Shitrit |
| Joint List (13) | Hadash (5) | Ayman Odeh • Aida Touma-Suleiman • Ofer Cassif • Yousef Jabareen • Jabar Asakla |
| Joint List (13) | Ra'am (3) | Mansour Abbas • Walid Taha • Said al-Harumi |
| Joint List (13) | Balad (3) | Mtanes Shehadeh • Heba Yazbak • Sami Abu Shehadeh |
| Joint List (13) | Ta'al (2) | Ahmad Tibi • Osama Saadi |
| Shas (9) | | Aryeh Deri • Yitzhak Cohen • Meshulam Nahari • Ya'akov Margi • Yoav Ben-Tzur • Michael Malchieli • Moshe Arbel • Yinon Azulai • Moshe Abutbul |
| Yisrael Beiteinu (8) | | Avigdor Lieberman • Oded Forer • Evgeny Sova • Eli Avidar • Yulia Malinovsky • Hamad Amar • Alex Kushnir • Mark Ifraimov |
| United Torah Judaism (7) | Agudat Yisrael (4) | Yaakov Litzman • Meir Porush • Ya'akov Tessler • Yisrael Eichler |
| United Torah Judaism (7) | Degel HaTorah (3) | Moshe Gafni • Uri Maklev • Ya'akov Asher |
| Labor-Gesher (6) | Labor (5) | Amir Peretz • Itzik Shmuli • Merav Michaeli • Omer Bar-Lev • Revital Swid |
| Labor-Gesher (6) | Gesher (1) | Orly Levy |
| Democratic Union (5) | Meretz (3) | Nitzan Horowitz • Tamar Zandberg • Ilan Gilon |
| Democratic Union (5) | Israel Democratic (1) | Yair Golan |
| Democratic Union (5) | Green Movement (1) | Stav Shaffir |
| Yamina (7) (Note: Member parties in Yamina made a pre-election agreement to dissolve the alliance following the September 2019 election, which occurred on 10 October 10, 2019. The alliance was revived a few months later before the 2020 election took place.) | Jewish Home (2) | Rafi Peretz • Moti Yogev |
| Yamina (7) | Tkuma (2) | Bezalel Smotrich • Ofir Sofer |
| Yamina (7) | New Right (3) | Ayelet Shaked • Naftali Bennett • Matan Kahana |

=== Replacements ===
| Date | Replacement | Party | Replacing | Notes |
|---|---|---|---|---|
| 19 January 2020 | Yorai Lahav-Hertzanu | Blue and White | Gadi Yevarkan | Yevarkan resigned after defecting to Likud. |

== See also ==
- September 2019 Israeli legislative election
