= List of members of the twenty-first Knesset =

Unicameral legislature of Israel

21st Knesset
←	20th	22nd	→

Overview
- Legislative body: Knesset
- Jurisdiction: Israel
- Meeting place: Knesset building
- Term: 30 April – 29 May 2019
- Election: April 2019 election
- Government: None (snap election)
- Website: www.main.knesset.gov.il/en

Knesset
- President: Reuven Rivlin
- Prime minister: Benjamin Netanyahu (caretaker)
- Speaker: Yuli Edelstein

The members of the 21st Knesset, the legislature of Israel, were elected on 9 April 2019.

== Members of the Knesset ==
The 21st Knesset had the highest number of new members being inducted since the state's founding at 49 newly-elected members of Knesset. Among this group 13 of them are women, and about half of the 49 are from the Blue and White alliance.

Alliance	Party	Name
Likud (35)		Benjamin Netanyahu • Yuli Edelstein • Israel Katz • Gilad Erdan • Gideon Sa'ar • Miri Regev • Yariv Levin • Yoav Gallant • Nir Barkat • Gila Gamliel • Avi Dichter • Ze'ev Elkin • Haim Katz • Tzachi Hanegbi • Ofir Akunis • Yuval Steinitz • Tzipi Hotovely • Dudi Amsalem • Amir Ohana • Ofir Katz • Eti Atiya • Yoav Kish • David Bitan • Keren Barak • Shlomo Karhi • Miki Zohar • Eli Ben-Dahan • Sharren Haskel • Michal Shir • Keti Shitrit • Fateen Mulla • May Golan • Uzi Dayan • Ariel Kellner • Osnat Mark
Blue and White (35)	Israel Resilience (15)	Benny Gantz • Gabi Ashkenazi • Avi Nissenkorn • Miki Haimovich • Michael Biton • Hili Tropper • Orit Farkash-Hacohen • Meirav Cohen • Asaf Zamir • Yizhar Shai • Omer Yankelevich • Gadeer Mreeh • Alon Schuster • Ram Shefa • Eitan Ginzburg
Blue and White (35)	Yesh Atid (15)	Yair Lapid • Meir Cohen • Ofer Shelah • Orna Barbivai • Yael German • Karin Elharar • Yoel Razvozov • Elazar Stern • Mickey Levy • Pnina Tamano-Shata • Ram Ben Barak • Yoav Segalovitz • Boaz Toporovsky • Idan Roll • Yorai Lahav-Hertzanu
Blue and White (35)	Telem (5)	Moshe Ya'alon • Yoaz Hendel • Zvi Hauser • Orly Fruman • Gadi Yevarkan
Shas (8)		Aryeh Deri • Yitzhak Cohen • Meshulam Nahari • Ya'akov Margi • Yoav Ben-Tzur • Michael Malchieli • Moshe Arbel • Yinon Azulai
United Torah Judaism (8)	Agudat Yisrael (4)	Yaakov Litzman • Meir Porush • Ya'akov Tessler • Yisrael Eichler
United Torah Judaism (8)	Degel HaTorah (4)	Moshe Gafni • Uri Maklev • Ya'akov Asher • Yitzhak Pindrus
Hadash–Ta'al (6)	Hadash (4)	Ayman Odeh • Aida Touma-Suleiman • Ofer Cassif • Yousef Jabareen
Hadash–Ta'al (6)	Ta'al (2)	Ahmad Tibi • Osama Saadi
Labor (6)		Avi Gabbay • Tal Russo • Itzik Shmuli • Shelly Yachimovich • Amir Peretz • Merav Michaeli
Yisrael Beiteinu (5)		Avigdor Lieberman • Oded Forer • Evgeny Sova • Eli Avidar • Yulia Malinovsky
URWP (5)	Jewish Home (3)	Rafi Peretz • Moti Yogev • Idit Silman
URWP (5)	Tkuma (2)	Bezalel Smotrich • Ofir Sofer
Meretz (4)		Tamar Zandberg • Ilan Gilon • Michal Rozin • Issawi Frej
Kulanu (4) (Note: Kulanu merged into Likud In May 2019 soon after the election)		Moshe Kahlon • Eli Cohen • Yifat Shasha-Biton • Roy Folkman
Ra'am (2)		Mansour Abbas • Abd al-Hakim Hajj Yahya
Balad (2)		Mtanes Shehadeh • Heba Yazbak

=== Replacements ===
Date	Replacement	Party	Replacing	Notes
1 August 2019	Merav Michaeli	Labor Party	Stav Shaffir	Shaffir resigned from the Knesset after leaving the Labor Party following her defeat in the party's leadership election.
