= Thirty-fifth government of Israel =

2020–21 government led by Benjamin Netanyahu

Netanyahu–Gantz government
- 35th Cabinet of Israel

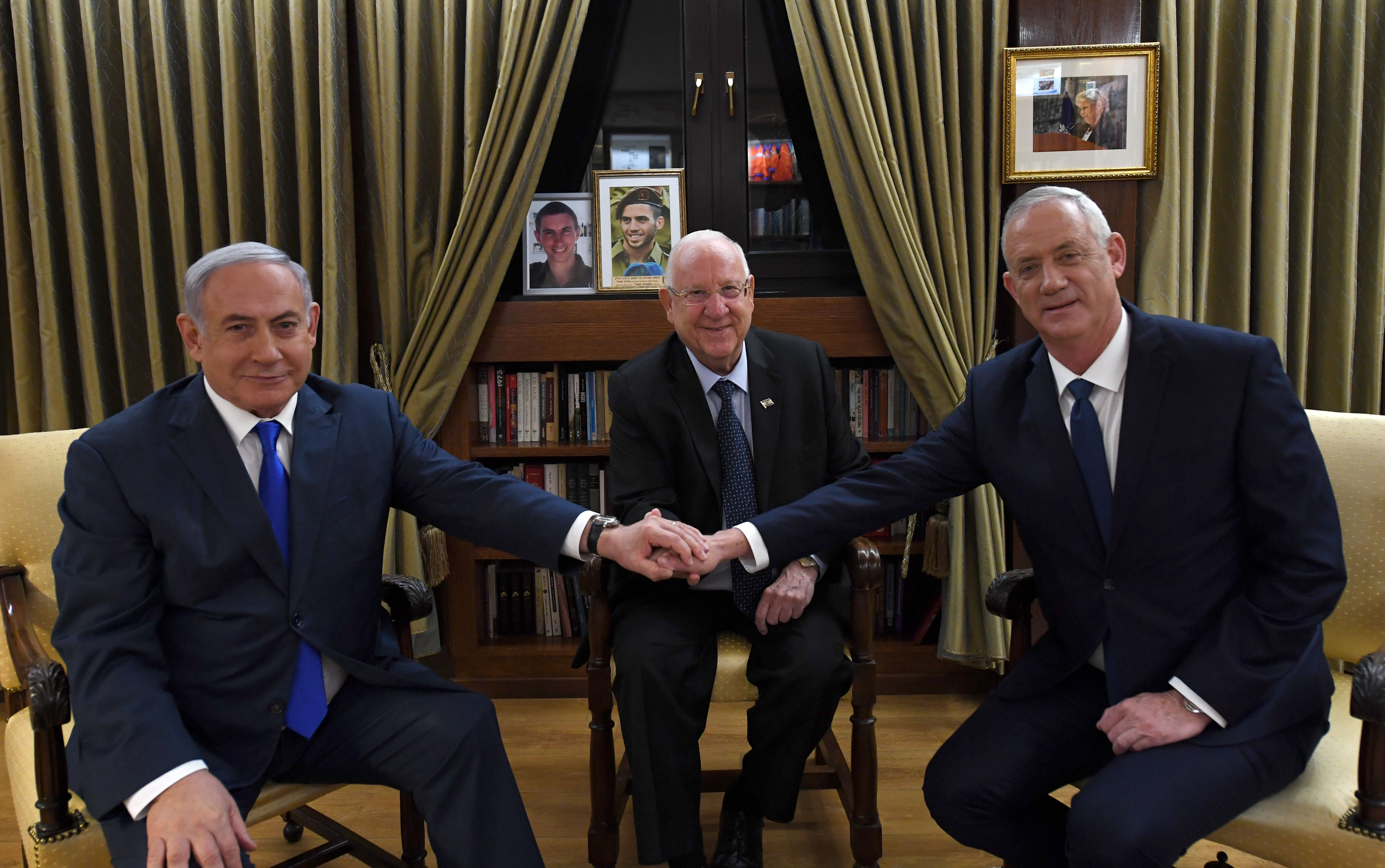
- Date formed: May 17, 2020
- Date dissolved: June 13, 2021

People and organisations
- President: Reuven Rivlin
- Prime minister: Benjamin Netanyahu
- Alternate prime minister: Benny Gantz
- No. of ministers: 28
- Member parties: Likud; Blue and White; Shas; United Torah Judaism; Labor (until 2021); Derekh Eretz (until 2020); Gesher (until 2021); The Jewish Home (until 2021)
- Status in legislature: Coalition; National unity; Rotation government
- Opposition parties: Yesh Atid–Telem; Joint List; Yisrael Beiteinu; Yamina; Meretz; Derekh Eretz (2020–2021); Labor (2021)
- Opposition leader: Yair Lapid

History
- Incoming formation: 2019–2022 political crisis
- Election: 2020 Knesset election
- Legislature term: 23rd Knesset
- Predecessor: 34th government
- Successor: 36th government

The thirty-fifth government of Israel (Hebrew: מֶמְשֶׁלֶת יִשְׂרָאֵל הַשְׁלוֹשִׁים וְחָמֵשׁ, romanized: Mem'shelet Yisra'el HaShloshim VeHamesh), or the Netanyahu–Gantz government, was the government of Israel which was sworn in on 17 May 2020 and dissolved on 13 June 2021.

It was originally expected to be established following the April 2019 election, but after prime minister Benjamin Netanyahu was unable to form a government, the Knesset dissolved itself, thereby setting up a snap election that took place on 17 September 2019. Following the second election, no one was able to form a government again, and a third election took place on 2 March 2020. An agreement was ultimately reached on 20 April 2020, between Netanyahu and MK Benny Gantz on the formation of a national unity government. The Knesset, and with it the current government's legislative operations, was again dissolved on 23 December 2020, resulting in the 2021 election. On 13 June 2021, in a 60–59 vote with 1 abstention, the Knesset voted to approve the thirty-sixth government of Israel led by Naftali Bennett and Yair Lapid, ending Netanyahu's 12-year second tenure as prime minister and sending Likud into the opposition.

== Background ==
=== First election – April 2019 ===
After the April 2019 Israeli legislative election, the Blue and White faction leader Benny Gantz conceded, paving the way for incumbent Prime Minister Benjamin Netanyahu, leader of Likud, to begin talks with other parties to form a governing coalition.

==== April 2019 recommendations ====
On 15 and 16 April, leaders of all the parties who won seats in the Knesset met with President Reuven Rivlin to recommend a designated person to form a government. Netanyahu received recommendations from leaders representing 65 seats in the Knesset, whereas Gantz received recommendations from leaders representing only 45 seats in the Knesset. Leaders of the two Arab parties, representing 10 seats in the Knesset, declined to make any recommendation.

Israeli government formation, April 2019
- 15-16 April 2019
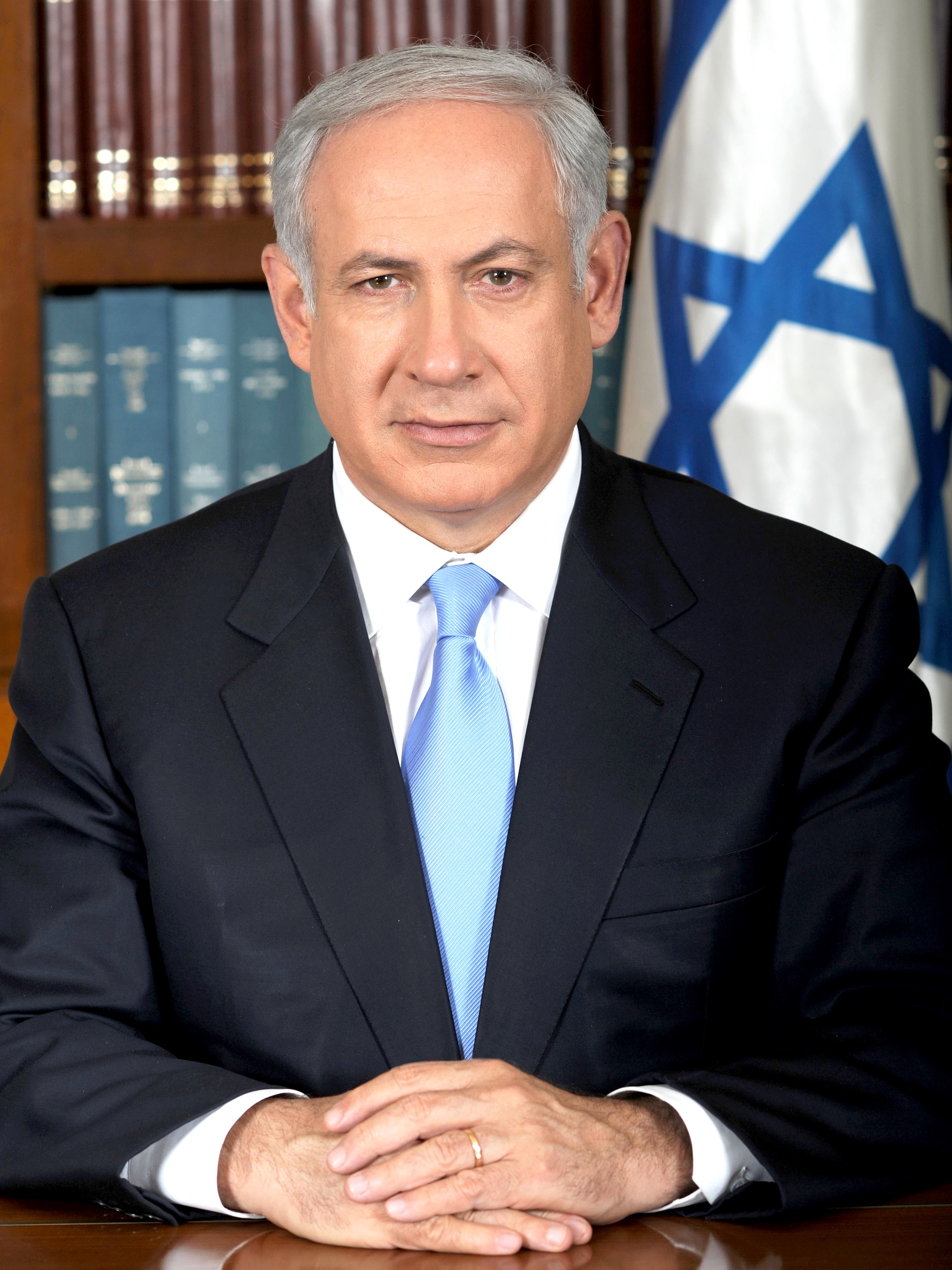

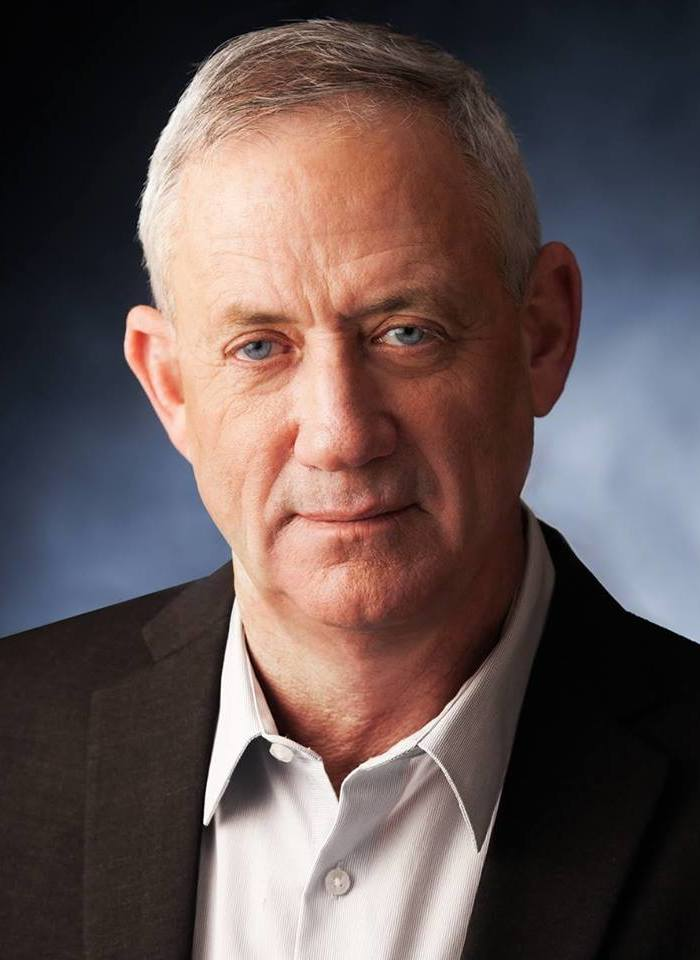
Nominee	Benjamin Netanyahu	Benny Gantz
Party	Likud	Blue and White
Electoral vote	65	45
Prime minister before election
Benjamin Netanyahu
Likud
Outcome of formation
No government formed and fresh elections called. Netanyahu remains prime minister ad interim

Party	Party Leader	Seats	Recommended	Source
Likud	Benjamin Netanyahu	35	Netanyahu	
Blue & White	Benny Gantz	35	Gantz	
Shas	Aryeh Deri	8	Netanyahu	
UTJ	Yaakov Litzman	8	Netanyahu	
Hadash–Ta'al	Ayman Odeh	6	No-one	
Labor	Avi Gabbay	6	Gantz	
Yisrael Beiteinu	Avigdor Lieberman	5	Netanyahu	
Union of Right-Wing Parties	Rafi Peretz	5	Netanyahu	
Meretz	Tamar Zandberg	4	Gantz	
Kulanu	Moshe Kahlon	4	Netanyahu	
Ra'am–Balad	Mansour Abbas	4	No-one	

On 18 April, president Reuven Rivlin officially tasked Netanyahu with the mandate for government formation. However, Netanyahu faced challenges from Yisrael Beiteinu on the issue of Haredi conscription leading to stalled negotiations over a coalition government, with Netanyahu receiving a two-week extension for the mandate on 14 May. Eventually, Netanyahu was unable to form a new government and returned the mandate. The 21st Knesset then voted to dissolve itself, leading to a new election.

=== Second election – September 2019 ===
On 17 September, Israel held the September 2019 election, with Blue and White leading Likud by a single seat in the results. In response, Avigdor Lieberman of Yisrael Beiteinu called for a "broad liberal government" that includes both Blue and White and Likud, and reiterated that he did not want to form any majority with the Arab parties. Benny Gantz claimed prime ministership and Blue and White repeated that they would not form a government with Netanyahu, although they were open to one with Likud. Benyamin Netanyahu called for a "strong Zionist government". On the left, Labor-Gesher stated it wanted to bring Arab parties "to the table", some of which are open to recommending Gantz.

On 18 September, Netanyahu met with the emissaries of Yamina, Shas, and UTJ, to build a right-wing bloc to negotiate together.

On 19 September, Rivlin, Netanyahu and Gantz met during a memorial ceremony for Shimon Peres. Netanyahu urged Gantz to speak with him about forming a unity government, for the sake of avoiding a third election. Gantz and Lapid from Blue and White both rejected Netanyahu's offer. They assert that their party won and Gantz had the right to lead a unity government committed to liberal policies on social issues. They also rejected discussing a unity government with Netanyahu as long as right-wing religious parties were included, with Lapid remarking that "if Netanyahu steps aside, we'll have a unity government". Lieberman likewise accused Netanyahu of "deception" by offering a unity government that was pre-conditioned on the inclusion of religious parties.

The same day, Gantz met with Nitzan Horowitz, leader of the Democratic Union. His aides said they expect a meeting with other party leaders, Odeh and Peretz. Labor-Gesher's six MKs could allow Netanyahu's bloc of 55 to find a majority. Likud thus reportedly offered Peretz the Finance portfolio, and a raise of the minimum wage, but the same sources say Peretz turned down the offer, which goes against a campaign vow. Netanyahu met with Degel HaTorah MKs, who, along with other Haredi parties (Shas, Agudat Yisrael), are starting to backtrack on their refusal not to govern with Lapid, in the case Lapid himself U-turns on Netanyahu. Lieberman was equivocal as to whether he would support Gantz, fearing to be sidelined from a unity government, or one that includes Haredim. According to Channel 13, Gantz reportedly promised to include Yisrael Beiteinu in any coalition.

On 21 September, the 13 MKs from the Joint List met together to discuss nominations. The 10 representatives from Hadash, Ta'al and Ra'am supported nominating Gantz on the condition of several "basic demands" on the peace process, the Arab community's interests, and the nation-state law. However, the 3 representatives from Balad rejected this decision. President Rivlin met with party leaders the next day for the first day of talks. Joint List leader Ayman Odeh then declared that the party had agreed to endorse Benny Gantz for prime minister after internal voting, which would give Gantz 57 votes over Netanyahu's 55. However, Rivlin revealed on 23 September that the three representatives from Balad withdrew their nominations for Gantz, and that representatives from the Joint List were not legally bound to follow the party's nominee. This left Gantz with three less nominations, with the results giving 55 nominations for Netanyahu and 54 for Gantz.

==== September 2019 recommendations ====
President Rivlin met with representatives of Blue and White, Likud, the Joint List, Shas and Yisrael Beiteinu on 22 September to ask for recommendations on whom to select for prime minister. The next day, he met with members of United Torah Judaism, Yamina, Labor-Gesher and the Democratic Union.

Israeli government formation, September 2019
- 22-23 September 2019
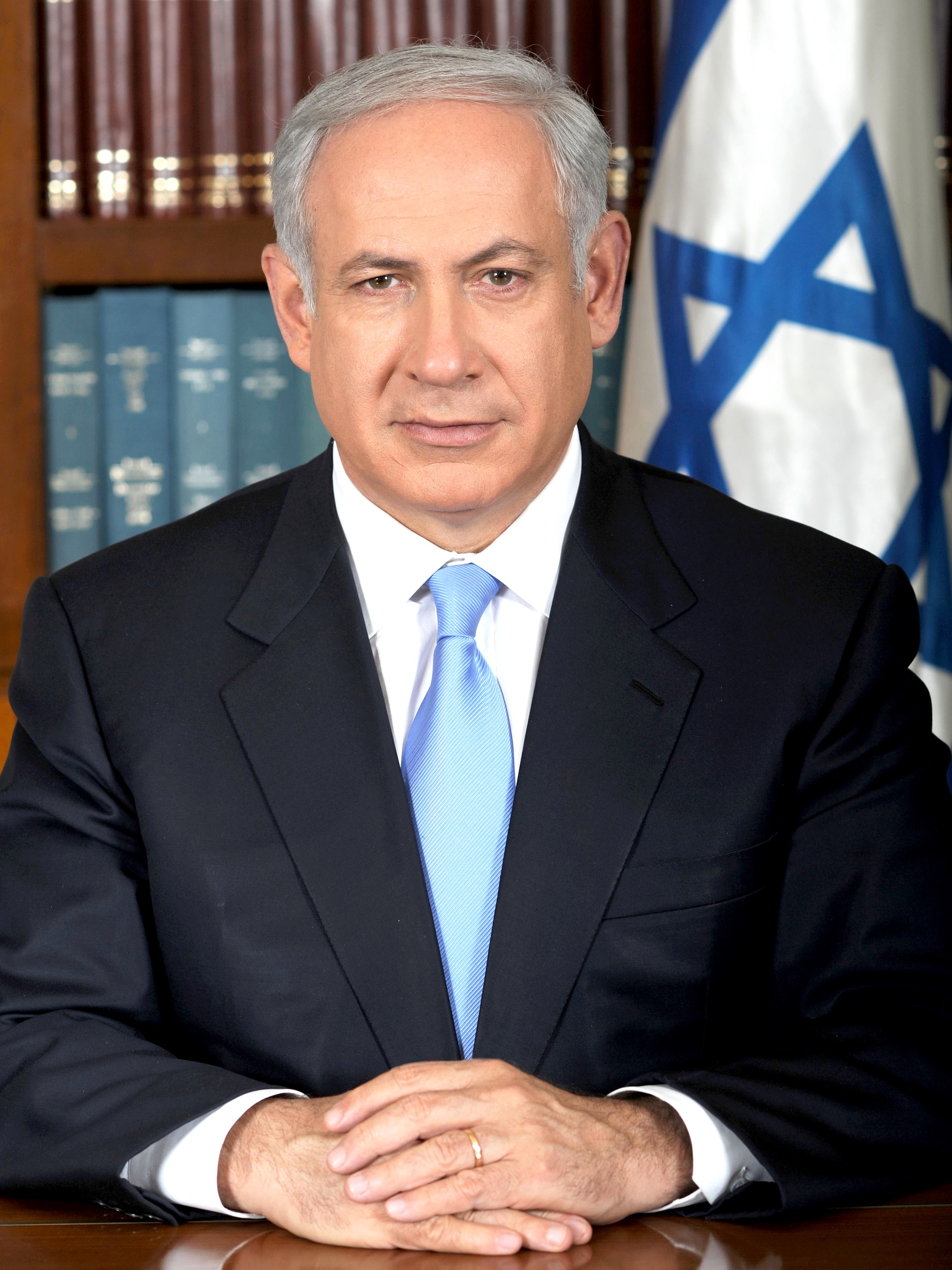

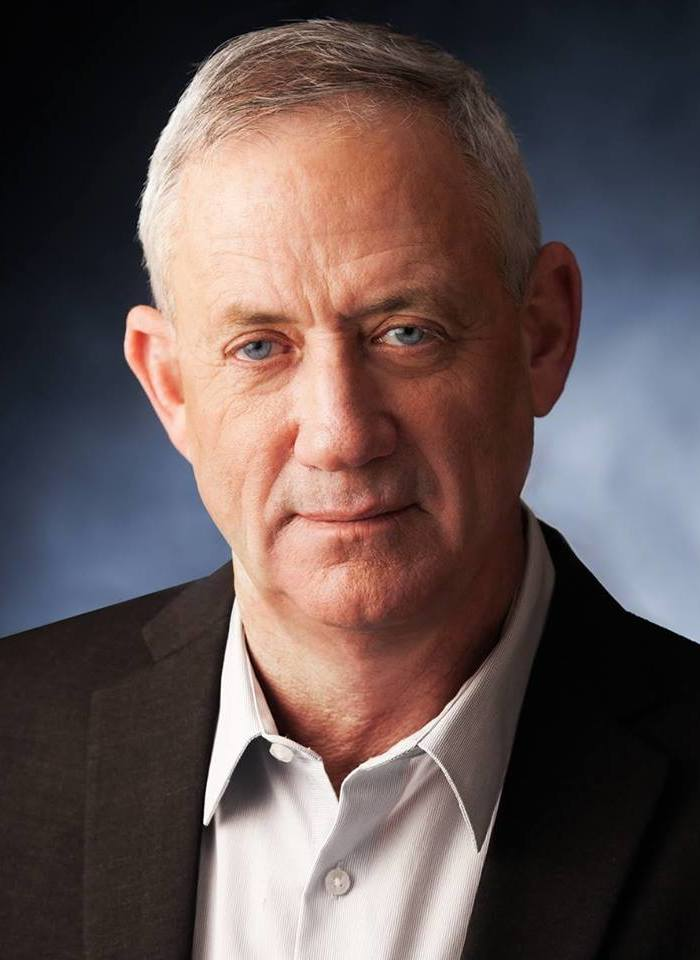
Nominee	Benjamin Netanyahu	Benny Gantz
Party	Likud	Blue and White
Electoral vote	55	54
Prime minister before election
Benjamin Netanyahu
Likud
Outcome of formation
No government formed and fresh elections called. Netanyahu remains prime minister ad interim

Party	Party Leader	Seats	Recommended	Source
Blue & White	Benny Gantz	33	Gantz	
Likud	Benjamin Netanyahu	32	Netanyahu	
Joint List	Ayman Odeh	13	divided	
Hadash	Ayman Odeh	5	Gantz	
Ta'al	Ahmad Tibi	2	Gantz	
Ra'am	Mansour Abbas	3	Gantz	
Balad	Mtanes Shehadeh	3	No-one	
Shas	Aryeh Deri	9	Netanyahu	
Yisrael Beiteinu	Avigdor Lieberman	8	No-one	
UTJ	Yaakov Litzman	7	Netanyahu	
Yamina	Ayelet Shaked	7	Netanyahu	
Labor-Gesher	Amir Peretz	6	Gantz	
Democratic Union	Nitzan Horowitz	5	Gantz	

Rivlin officially chose Netanyahu to form the next government on 25 September, though he conditioned it on Netanyahu giving back the mandate if he failed to form a government, to avoid another dissolution of the Knesset. Netanyahu agreed to this stipulation and called for a "unity government" between himself, his allied religious parties, and Gantz. Gantz refused, on the basis that he had promised during the election not to join a Netanyahu-led coalition, and furthermore that a coalition that included all of Netanyahu's allies would not truly be a unity government. Efforts to resolve the deadlock were unsuccessful, and on 21 October Netanyahu returned the mandate to Rivlin.

On 23 October, Rivlin's office tasked Gantz with forming a government; this mandate was given back to Rivlin on 21 November. From that day, MKs had three weeks in which they could choose to nominate any of themselves to serve as PM. The selected MK would have had to secure the support of 61 MKs. However, no MK was able to form a government, and it was determined on 12 December that a third election would take place on 2 March 2020.

=== Third election – March 2020 ===
Following the 2020 election in March, several parties supported Gantz in forming a new government, including Avigdor Lieberman of Yisrael Beiteinu on 8 March and the Joint List on 9 March. However, Orly Levy announced on 10 March that she would not support a minority government and left the Labor-Gesher-Meretz alliance over this. Similarly, Blue and White MKs Zvi Hauser and Yoaz Hendel had previously stated that they would not support a government that relied on the Joint List's support. There were reports on 10 March that Gantz was planning to form a minority government by 23 March. On 11 March, Lieberman and Labor party leader Amir Peretz reaffirmed that an alliance with the Joint List would not change their party's position on forming a political alliance with Gantz.

On 15 March, Israeli President Reuven Rivlin announced that he had asked Gantz to form the new government after Gantz received support from 61 of the 120 MKs. The elected MKs were sworn in the next day on the 16th.

==== Speakership constitutional crisis ====
Speaker Yuli Edelstein had held the job since 2013 and kept his job throughout the interim Knessets of 2019. He refused to leave this time and shut down the body as soon as it was sworn in. Edelstein proposed that left and right coalitions hold equal numbers of members in the parliamentary committees with Likud chairpersons, but the opposition refused. They then went to the courts to force the assembly to reopen, in which they were successful.

On 23 March, the Supreme Court of Israel unanimously ruled that Edelstein should hold a vote on his replacement as Speaker, criticizing him for defying a previous non-binding ruling by the court advising him to do so. Rather than comply, Edelstein stepped down as the Speaker of the Knesset on 25 March, the first time that a speaker has unilaterally resigned. The court subsequently ruled later on 25 March that Amir Peretz, as the most senior member of the Knesset, would be granted the authority to convene the Knesset for a vote on a new speaker. Gantz then announced that he would stand as a candidate for speaker, resulting in a split of the Blue and White coalition as well as announcements of a deal in which he would serve as speaker until a unity government is formed under Netanyahu, and then would serve as defense minister in the unity government until replacing Netanyahu as prime minister in September 2021.

On 26 March, Meir Cohen withdrew his candidacy to avoid competing with Gantz. Later that day, MKs elected Gantz as the new Speaker of the Knesset by a margin of 74–18 with support from Likud, while Yesh Atid, Labor and Yisrael Beiteinu MKs boycotted the vote.

==== March 2020 recommendations ====
Israeli government formation, March 2020
- 15 March 2020
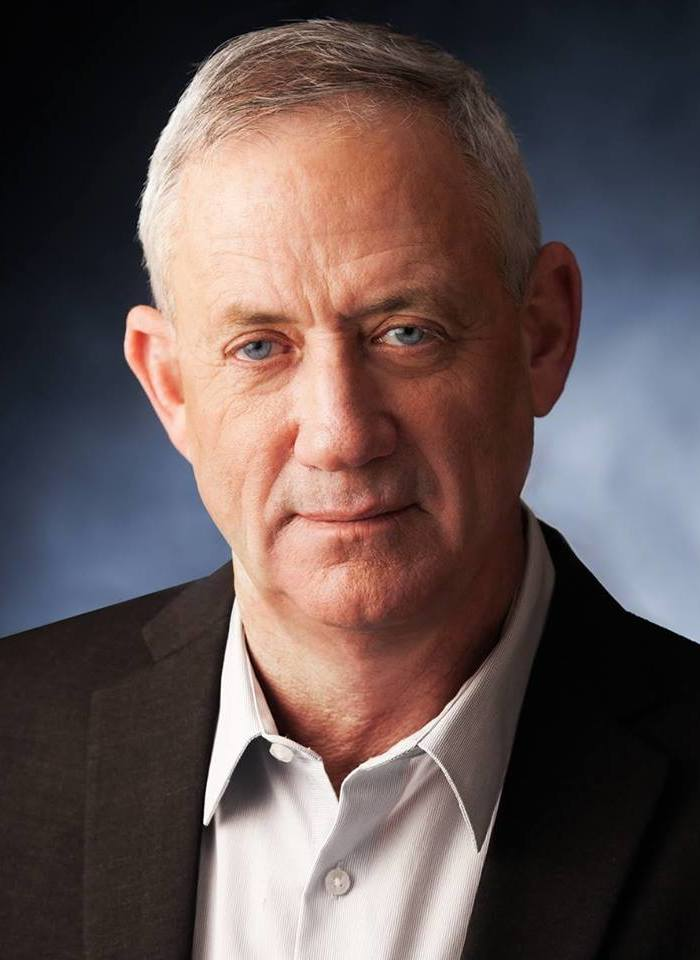

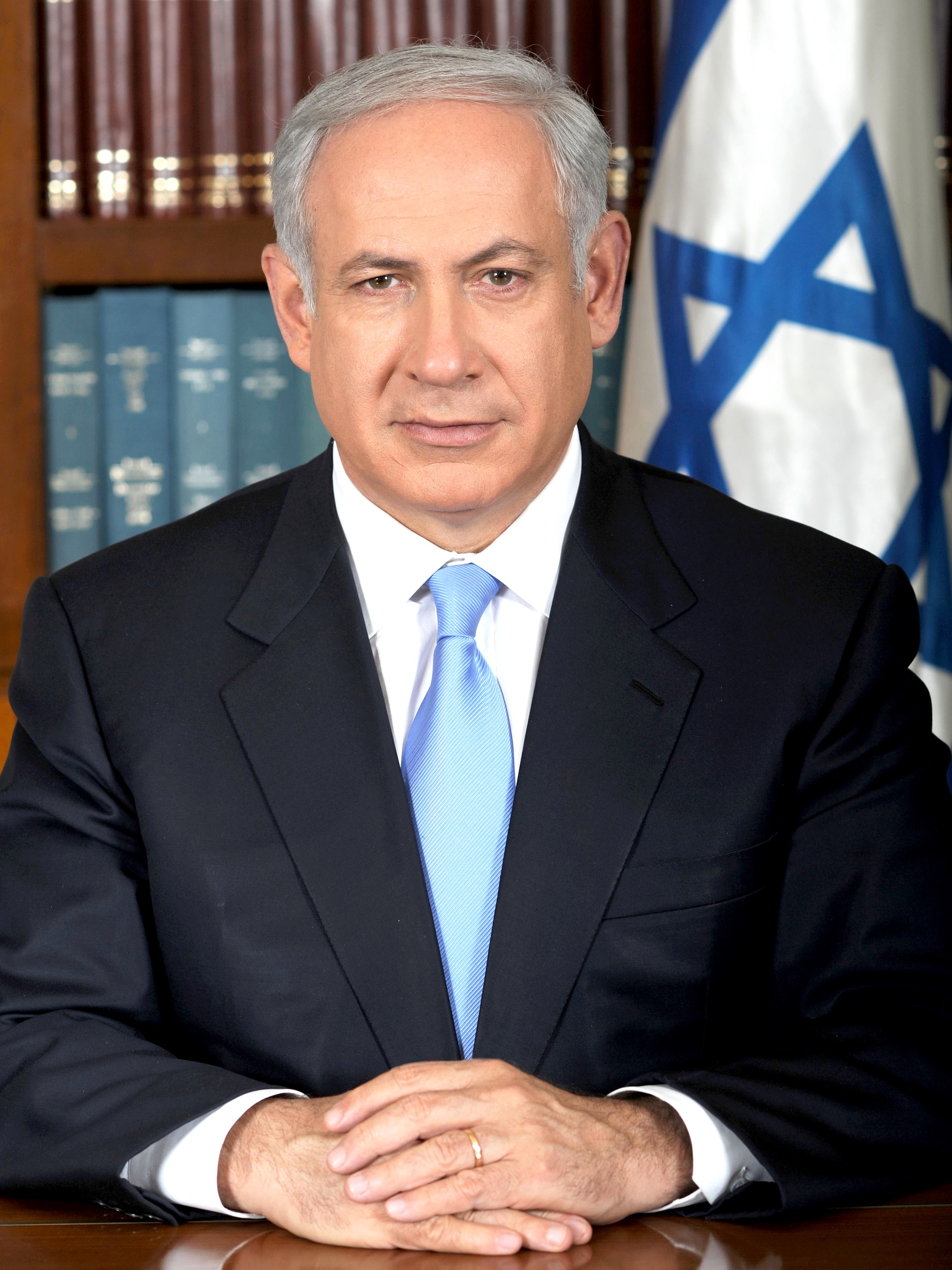
Nominee	Benny Gantz	Benjamin Netanyahu
Party	Blue and White	Likud
Electoral vote	61	58; Subsequently nominated via a letter signed by 72 MKs
Investiture vote in favor		73
Investiture vote against		46
Prime minister before election
Benjamin Netanyahu
Likud
Outcome of formation
Benjamin Netanyahu
Likud

President Rivlin met with all elected parties and received their recommendations for prime minister on 15 March. Rivlin gave Gantz the mandate to form a government on 16 March.

Party	Party Leader	Seats	Recommended	Source
Likud	Benjamin Netanyahu	36	Netanyahu	
Blue & White	Benny Gantz	33	Gantz	
Joint List	Ayman Odeh	15	Gantz	
Shas	Aryeh Deri	9	Netanyahu	
UTJ	Yaakov Litzman	7	Netanyahu	
Labor-Gesher-Meretz	Amir Peretz	7	divided	
Labor	Amir Peretz	3	Gantz	
Meretz	Nitzan Horowitz	3	Gantz	
Gesher	Orly Levy	1	No-one	
Yisrael Beiteinu	Avigdor Lieberman	7	Gantz	
Yamina	Naftali Bennett	6	Netanyahu	

Initially following the election, Gantz could not form a government because he previously promised not to form a government with Netanyahu, and at the same time could not rely on external support from the Joint List for a minority government due to opposition from several Blue and White MKs. However, with the worsening of the COVID-19 pandemic in Israel, Gantz reversed his stance on Netanyahu and now supported an "emergency coalition" due to an urgent need to address the public health crisis. On 21 March, Netanyahu announced negotiations were completed for a national unity government with a rotating prime ministership where Netanyahu would serve first, and would later be replaced by Gantz, although Gantz denied this and claimed negotiations were still ongoing.

On 26 March, Gantz become Speaker of Knesset with support from Likud, threatening unity in the Blue and White alliance due to some internal opposition towards cooperating with Netanyahu.

On 27 March, it was revealed that a major obstacle to a possible long-term alliance between Gantz and Netanyahu emerged with regard to implementing U.S. President Donald Trump's Middle East peace plan. Barak Ravid of Israel's Channel 13 news revealed that Gantz, despite previously claiming that he wanted to implement the peace plan, still wanted to hold peace talks with the Palestinians, which Trump and Netanyahu still opposed. Subsequently, after long negotiations, a compromise deal was reached over the peace plan. Ravid stated that this would likely make the upcoming deal between Gantz and Netanyahu short-lived.

By early April, there were proposals of a coalition deal between Netanyahu and Gantz, where Gantz was to replace Netanyahu as Prime Minister of Israel after 18 months in government. Gantz's term as prime minister-designate was going to end on 14 April, though President Rivlin extended it until 15 April.

==== Coalition government ====
On 20 April 2020, Gantz and Netanyahu announced that agreement on a unity government had been reached. The deal would involve both parties sharing power, and Gantz and Netanyahu taking turns being prime minister. Under the agreement, Netanyahu would serve as prime minister for 18 months until October 2021, and Gantz would become prime minister for 18 months afterwards. However, should Netanyahu leave the premiership early, Gantz would take over the position. Regarding ministerial roles, Blue and White received an equal number of ministers as parties the national camp. Blue and White received the Justice, Economy, Labor and Welfare, Communications, Agriculture, Culture and Sports, Absorption, Tourism, Minorities, Diaspora, Science and Space, Strategic Affairs, and Social Affairs ministries. The positions of foreign minister, energy minister and environmental protection minister will rotate upon the change of prime minister. The terms of the agreement also provide that Gantz serve as defense minister when the new government is sworn in.

On 21 April, several watchdog groups, including the Movement for Quality Government in Israel, reacted to the news by petitioning the Supreme Court to block the formation of the government due to the indictment of Netanyahu.

On 30 April, the bill approving the new coalition government was given its first approval in Knesset. On 6 May, the coalition agreement was approved by the Israeli Supreme Court. The same day, both Blue and White and Likud issued a joint statement claiming that the new unity government would be sworn in the following week.

On 7 May, Netanyahu won the support of 72 MKs to form a government, with Rivlin giving Netanyahu a two-week mandate to form a government shortly after. The Knesset approved the bill for government formation, with support coming from Blue and White, Likud, Derekh Eretz, Gesher, Shas and United Torah Judaism as well as two of the three members of the Labor Party.

On 17 May, the 35th government was officially sworn in.

== Members of government ==
On 17 May 2020, the following were announced to the Knesset as members in the new government:

=== Ministers ===
Portfolio	Minister	Party
Prime Minister	Benjamin Netanyahu	Likud
Alternate Prime Minister	Benny Gantz	Blue and White
Minister of Defense	Benny Gantz	Blue and White
Minister of Agriculture and Rural Development	Alon Schuster	Blue and White
Minister of Aliyah and Integration	Pnina Tamano-Shata	Blue and White
Minister of Community Empowerment and Advancement	Orly Levy-Abekasis	Gesher
Minister of Communications	Yoaz Hendel (May 2020–Dec. 2020)	Derekh Eretz
Minister of Communications	Benny Gantz (Dec. 2020 – May 2021)	Blue and White
Minister of Communications	Eitan Ginzburg (May 2021 – Jun. 2021)	Blue and White
Minister of Housing and Construction	Yaakov Litzman (May 2020–Sep. 2020)	United Torah Judaism
Minister of Housing and Construction	Benjamin Netanyahu (Sep. 2020–Oct. 2020)	Likud
Minister of Housing and Construction	Yitzhak Cohen (Oct. 2020–Nov. 2020)	Shas
Minister of Housing and Construction	Yaakov Litzman (Nov. 2020–Jun. 2021)	United Torah Judaism
Minister of Culture and Sport	Hili Tropper	Blue and White
Minister of Cyber and National Digital Matters	Dudi Amsalem	Likud
Minister in the Defense Ministry	Michael Biton	Blue and White
Minister of Diaspora Affairs	Omer Yankelevich	Blue and White
Minister of the Economy	Amir Peretz	Labor; Blue and White (not an MK)
Minister of Education	Yoav Gallant	Likud
Minister of Environmental Protection	Gila Gamliel	Likud
Minister of Finance	Israel Katz	Likud
Minister in the Finance Ministry	Yitzhak Cohen (Oct. 2020–Nov. 2020)	Shas
Minister of Foreign Affairs	Gabi Ashkenazi	Blue and White
Minister of Health	Yuli Edelstein	Likud
Minister of Higher Education	Ze'ev Elkin (May 2020–Dec. 2020)	Likud
Minister of Higher Education	Yoav Gallant (Jan. 2021–Jun. 2021)	Likud
Minister of Water	Ze'ev Elkin (May 2020–Dec. 2020)	Likud
Minister of Water	Yuval Steinitz (Jan. 2021–Jun. 2021)	Likud
Minister of Intelligence	Eli Cohen	Likud
Minister of the Interior	Aryeh Deri	Shas
Minister of the Development of the Periphery	Aryeh Deri	Shas
Minister of Jerusalem Affairs	Rafi Peretz	The Jewish Home
Minister of Justice	Avi Nissenkorn (May 2020–Jan. 2021)	Blue and White
Minister of Justice	Benny Gantz (Jan. 2021–Apr. 2021); (Apr. 2021–Jun. 2021)	Blue and White
Minister of Labor, Social Affairs, and Social Services	Itzik Shmuli (Jan. 2021–Feb. 2021)	Labor
Minister of Labor, Social Affairs, and Social Services	Benny Gantz (Feb. 2021–Jun. 2021)	Blue and White
Minister of National Infrastructure, Energy, and Water	Yuval Steinitz	Likud
Minister of Internal Security	Amir Ohana	Likud
Minister of Regional Cooperation	Gilad Erdan (May 2020–Jul. 2020)	Likud
Minister of Regional Cooperation	Ofir Akunis (Jul. 2020–Jun. 2021)	Likud
Minister of Religious Affairs	Ya'akov Avitan	Shas
Minister of Science and Technology	Yizhar Shai (May 2020–Jan. 2021)	Blue and White
Minister of Science and Technology	Hili Tropper (May 2021–Jun. 2021)	Blue and White
Minister of Settlement Affairs	Tzipi Hotovely (May 2020–Aug. 2020)	Likud
Minister of Settlement Affairs	Tzachi Hanegbi (Aug. 2020–Jun. 2021)	Likud
Minister for Social Equality	Meirav Cohen (May 2020–Jan. 2021)	Blue and White
Minister for Social Equality	Itzik Shmuli (Jan. 2021 – May 2021)	Labor
Minister for Social Equality	Michael Biton (May 2021 – Jun. 2021)	Blue and White
Minister of Strategic Affairs	Orit Farkash-Hacohen (May 2020–Nov. 2020)	Blue and White
Minister of Strategic Affairs	Michael Biton (Nov. 2020–Jun. 2021)	Blue and White
Minister of Tourism	Asaf Zamir (May 2020–Oct. 2020)	Blue and White
Minister of Tourism	Orit Farkash-Hacohen (Oct. 2020–Jun. 2021)	Blue and White
Minister of Transportation	Miri Regev	Likud
Minister without portfolio	Tzachi Hanegbi (May 2020–Aug. 2020)	Likud

=== Deputy ministers ===
Portfolio	Deputy Minister	Party
Deputy Prime Minister's Office	Fateen Mulla	Likud
Deputy Minister of Finance	Yitzhak Cohen (May 2020–Oct. 2020; Nov. 2020–Jun. 2021)	Shas
Deputy Minister of Internal Security	Gadi Yevarkan	Likud
Deputy Minister of Health	Yoav Kisch	Likud
Deputy Minister of Education	Meir Porush	United Torah Judaism
Deputy Minister of Labor, Social Affairs, and Social Services	Meshulam Nahari	Shas
Deputy Minister of Interior	Yoav Ben Tzur	Shas
Deputy Minister of Transportation	Uri Maklev	United Torah Judaism

== Policies ==
=== Coronavirus response ===
In May 2020, the government established the Coronavirus response cabinet to combat the COVID-19 pandemic in Israel.

In December 2020, the government advanced the "Giving a Shoulder" program aimed at encouraging vaccination for millions of Israelis.

Regarding the financial impacts of the pandemic, the government provided financial assistance to Israelis who have been impacted financially, and also approved the creation of a directorate for providing vocational training. In November, legislation was passed to increase public procurement of domestic products as part of economic recovery efforts.

=== Veteran care ===
In May 2021, the government approved 300 million shekels towards the rehabilitation of disabled IDF soldiers.

=== Telecommunications ===
In September 2020, the government approved a plan to connect thousands of Israeli households with fiber optics. In the same month, the government approved legislation establishing a "Don't Call Me" database aimed at preventing phone fraud targeting seniors.

In December, the government established an inquiry hotline for the Haredi public in an effort to make the public sector more accessible.

=== Environmental protection ===
Legislation was passed to expand existing deposit legislation for plastic bottles to also include bottles between 1.5 and 5 litres.

== Evaluation ==
This unity government was an attempt to address the 2018–2022 Israeli political crisis by bridging the divide between the national camp and the change bloc. However, there were disagreements over how successful this attempt was. Some analysts viewed these efforts positively viewing unity as necessary to address the nation's challenges, most notably the COVID-19 pandemic in Israel. Others however viewed this government more negatively as the agreement "in practice sheltered him from future prosecution" referring to the trial of Benjamin Netanyahu. There was also disappointment from the Arab sector that Gantz overlooked Arab parties for potential cooperation, with a Haaretz columnist criticizing the change bloc parties where they "effectively support [Netanyahu's] divisive messages, which harden Israel’s identity as a closed nation-state with a bunker mentality".

== See also ==
- 2020 in Israel
- 2020s in political history
- List of members of the twenty-third Knesset
