= Blue and White (political party) =

Israeli political party

Blue and White Israel Resilience Party כחול לבן חוסן לישראל
- Leader: Benny Gantz
- Founded: 27 December 2018
- Ideology: Liberalism (Israeli); Liberal Zionism
- Political position: Centre
- National affiliation: Blue and White (2019–2020); National Unity (2022–2025)
- Colours: Light blue
- Slogan: Israel before everything
- Knesset: 0 / 120

Election symbol
- כן ك‌ن

Website
- kachollavan.org.il

Blue and White Israel Resilience Party (Hebrew: כחול לבן חוסן לישראל, romanized: Kahol Lavan Hosen LeYisrael, lit. 'Blue and White Resilience for Israel') is a centrist, liberal Zionist political party in Israel which was founded in December 2018 as the Israel Resilience Party by Benny Gantz, former Chief of the General Staff of the Israel Defense Forces.

The party first ran in the April 2019 Knesset elections, as part of the Blue and White alliance. In the 2022 Knesset elections the party ran as part of the National Unity alliance. In July 2025, following the resignations of Gadi Eisenkot and Matan Kahana, party leader Benny Gantz announced that the party would revert to its original name, Blue and White, though the party name was changed to Blue and White-National Unity on 7 July 2025 after the name change was approved by the Knesset House Committee. The following year, the party withdrew from the 2026 Israeli legislative election.

In general, the Israel Resilience Party is mainly regarded as a centrist party; it has also been evaluated as centre-right or centre-left.

== History ==
2019 Logo of the Israel Resilience Party

On 16 February 2015, Benny Gantz completed his term as Chief of the General Staff and entered a three-year legal cooling-off period in which he could not run for the Knesset, which ended on 2 July 2018. Subsequently, in September 2018, it was reported that Gantz planned to enter politics. On 27 December, the day after the dissolution of the 20th Knesset, Gantz submitted 109 signatures to register a new political party under the name Hosen L'Yisrael ("Resilience for Israel"), officially known in English as the Israel Resilience Party.

The Israel Resilience Party initially formed an alliance with Telem, led by former Chief of the General Staff Moshe Ya'alon, in late January 2019, ahead of the April 2019 legislative election. On 21 February 2019, the alliance was joined by Yair Lapid's Yesh Atid in a list called Blue and White. Under the agreement, should the alliance win the election, Gantz and Lapid would rotate the premiership, with Gantz first serving 2.5 years, followed by Lapid completing the term.

=== 2020 unity government ===
During the April 2019 election, Blue and White won 35 seats, tied with Likud, which narrowly topped the popular vote. However, after Likud's leader Benjamin Netanyahu's inability to form a new government, new elections were called for September of the same year. Blue and White won the election with 33 seats, one more than Likud, but Israeli President Reuven Rivlin first gave Netanyahu the chance to form the new government. Netanyahu was unable to form a government and President Rivlin gave the mandate to lead the process to Gantz, who was also unable to secure a coalition. Therefore, new elections were called for March 2020, in which Likud won three more seats than Blue and White.

Gantz was elected the Speaker of the Knesset in March 2020 as part of an anticipated unity government with Likud. This led to divisions within the Blue and White alliance as some refused to cooperate with Netanyahu, and the alliance soon dissolved. Gantz also renamed his party from "Israel Resilience" to "Blue and White" to retain the name.

In the midst of the COVID-19 pandemic, Gantz and Netanyahu conducted negotiations for a unity government to address the public health crisis. On 20 April, the two leaders reached an agreement on a coalition, where Netanyahu would serve as prime minister for 18 months until October 2021, and Gantz would become prime minister for 18 months afterwards. Regarding ministerial roles, Blue and White received an equal number of ministers as parties the national camp. Blue and White received the Justice, Economy, Labor and Welfare, Communications, Agriculture, Culture and Sports, Absorption, Tourism, Minorities, Diaspora, Science and Space, Strategic Affairs, and Social Affairs ministries. The positions of foreign minister, energy minister and environmental protection minister would rotate upon the change of prime minister. The terms of the agreement also provided that Gantz serve as defense minister when the new government would be sworn in.

On 30 April, the bill approving the new coalition government was given its first approval in Knesset. On 6 May, the coalition agreement was approved by the Israeli Supreme Court. The same day, both Blue and White and Likud issued a joint statement claiming that the new unity government would be sworn in the following week. On 7 May, the bill approving the new government became law after it was given its final approval in Knesset. The new 35th government, consisting of many Blue and White and Likud coalition members, was sworn in on 17 May 2020.

In December 2020, a budget dispute in the government ultimately led to the dissolution of the Knesset and a new legislative election.

=== 2021 government ===
Blue and White's logo during the 2021 election

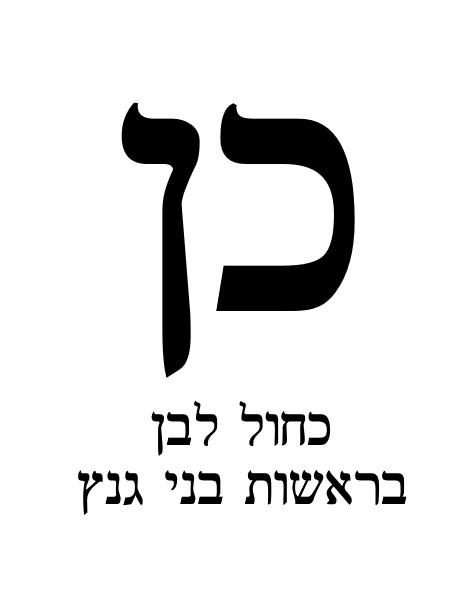
Ballot paper used by Blue and White during the 2021 election

In the 2021 legislative election, Blue and White won eight seats and became the fourth largest party in the Knesset. During the government formation process, party leader Gantz rejected a rotation government offer from Benjamin Netanyahu similar to one implemented in the 35th government. Instead, Blue and White conducted negotiations with other members of the "change bloc" with the goal of unseating Netanyahu as prime minister. Eventually, negotiations were successful and Blue and White became part of the 36th government with three ministerial roles.

=== Return to opposition ===
Logo of Blue and White joint list with New Hope during 2022 Israeli legislative election

On 10 July 2022, Gantz of Blue and White signed an agreement with New Hope leader Gideon Sa'ar for an electoral alliance in the upcoming 2022 election. The alliance was named "Blue and White–New Hope" and Gantz served as leader. The following month, former IDF Chief of Staff Gadi Eisenkot and former Yamina MK Matan Kahana both joined the alliance as independents, and the three groups together established the National Unity alliance. winning 12 seats in the Knesset.

On 28 August 2023, the party changed its name to "Blue and White Israel Resilience".

=== Gaza war cabinet ===
In October 2023, the October 7 attacks and the outbreak of the Gaza war brought Blue and White into the Israeli war cabinet and the thirty-seventh government of Israel.

In June 2024, Blue and White left the war cabinet amidst frustration with the Gaza war hostage crisis, with Gantz losing his ability to "moderate policy", according to the Jerusalem Post.

=== 2026 election campaign, member exits and withdrawal ===
On 7 July 2025, after the dissolution of the National Unity alliance, the Knesset House Committee approved Blue and White renaming itself to "Blue and White-National Unity".

Gadi Eisenkot, who was a co-founder of Blue and White, left the party in July and founded Yashar in September.

On 14 July, the party announced that it will conduct its first leadership primary ahead of the next Knesset election, marking a shift toward internal democratization.

On 24 July 2025, MK Orit Farkash-Hacohen informed Gantz of her intention to leave the party and join Eisenkot's planned new party, stating that she would not resign from the Knesset in order to avoid giving the coalition an additional vote.

Gantz further distanced himself from the opposition parties in April 2026 in anticipation of the 2026 Israeli legislative election and criticized the formation of the Together alliance between Yesh Atid and Bennett 2026 that same month.

On 3 May 2026, Hili Tropper announced that he planned to leave the party and would stand for re-election with a different party in the upcoming Knesset election. Two days later, Eitan Ginzburg also announced his pending exit from the party in search of "another political framework" as the party "failed to clear the electoral threshold in recent polls".

By June, Gantz established a party platform which aimed to "put an end to boycotts and the war between blocs" and "form a broad Zionist government without extremists". He also stressed that "Iran is never allowed to revive its nuclear program" and the importance of "preventing Hezbollah and Hamas from rebuilding their military capabilities".

In early June 2026, ahead of the October 2026 election, Gantz was reported to be in advanced merger talks with retired brigadier general Dedi Simchi and economist Yaron Zelekha. There were reports of a potential merger in late June with Simchi and The Reservists leader Yoaz Hendel, though the question of whether to align with Ultra-Orthodox parties in a government was a "sticking point", as Hendel is unwilling to partner with them. Simchi and Gantz formed an alliance in late June, emphasizing increasing enlistment and the formation of a "broad Zionist government." The negotiations for a joint run with Hendel had failed by the next month, as the differences were insurmountable.

Gantz continued to push for the formation of what he has called "the third bloc", neither aligned with the "full right-wing" nor aligned with the "change government", and conducted negotiations with Gilad Erdan's Unity party in late August.

In August, Gantz reiterated the priorities of a unity government as "security, service for all, a constitution, and public education" and also ruled out supporting a Netanyahu government. Parties which are in favor of pursuing a unity government are known as the Third Bloc.

On 9 September, as submission of party lists for the 2026 election closed, only three of the eight sitting Blue and White MKs remained on the list, namely Gantz, Pnina Tamano-Shata and Alon Schuster. Other members either retired or joined different parties. Various Blue and White MKs, including Eisenkot, Farkash-Hacohen, Matan Kahana, Tropper and Elazar Stern, joined Yashar, while Ginzburg joined Together.

On 18 September, Gantz announced that he will withdraw the party from the 2026 election if the party remained below electoral threshold a week before the election. Gantz issued a statement in early October emphasising that he would stay in the race, before withdrawing on 19 October.

== Ideology and policies ==
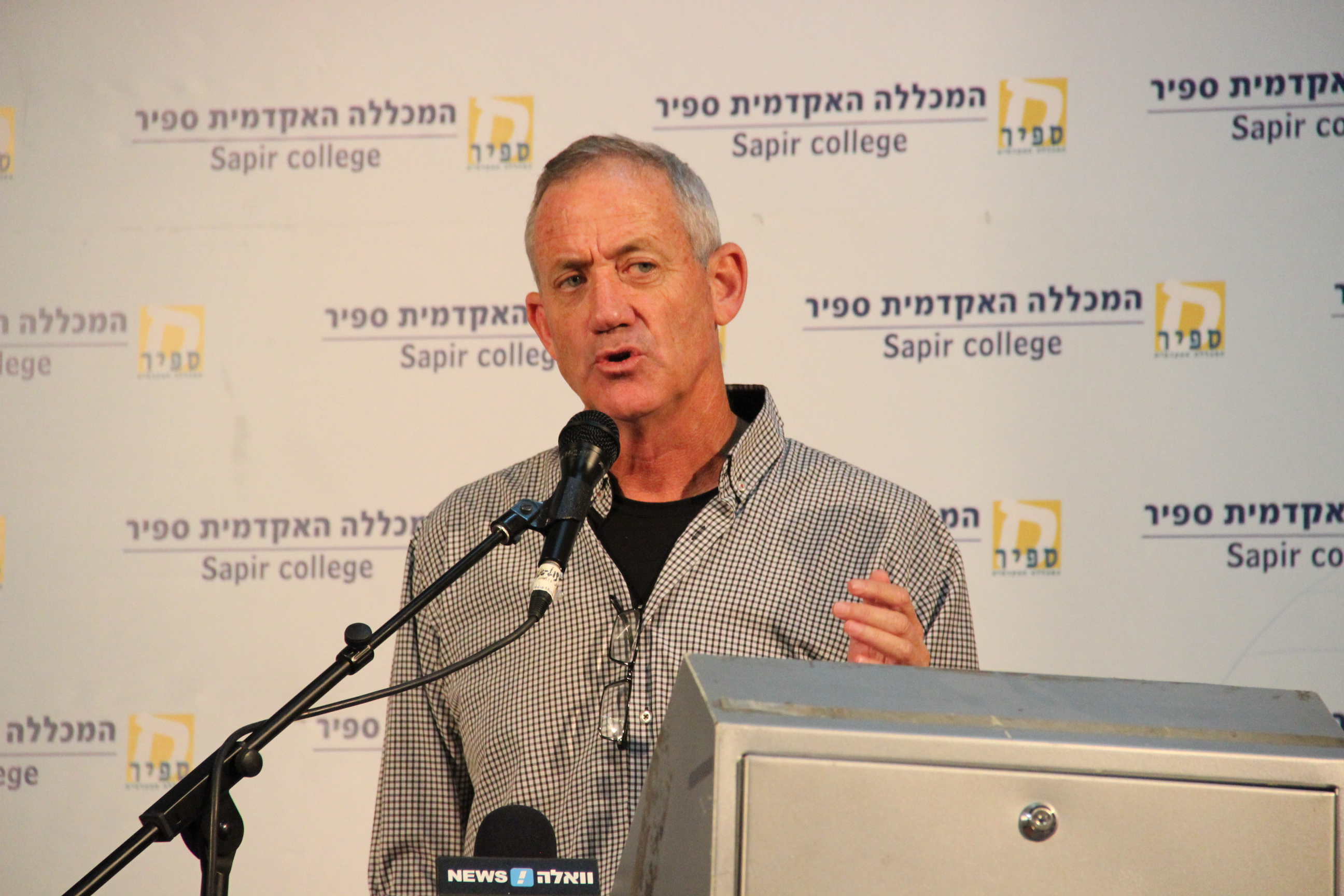
Benny Gantz at the Sderot Conference for Society, Sapir Academic College, 2015

According to the official registration document handed to the Registrar of Parties on 27 December 2018, the Israel Resilience Party's goals are:

Continuing to establish and strengthen the State of Israel as a Jewish and democratic state in light of the Zionist vision, as expressed in the Declaration of Independence, while determining and changing the national priorities on the following subjects: education, national infrastructure development, agriculture, law and internal security, welfare policy, and peace and security.

In his first campaign speech on 29 January 2019, party leader Gantz described Israel as "a leading high-tech country with a low-tech government that is self-employed". He vowed to provide incentives for entrepreneurs and medical students, "impose harsh sanctions on those who speculatively raise land and housing prices", as well as build and expand more hospitals. Furthermore, he said he will create new jobs in the agriculture sector.

Gantz also focused on ensuring equal rights and opportunities for all citizens, and combating violence against women. He promised to "deepen my partnerships with the ultra-Orthodox, the Arabs, and the Druze" in establishing a civil service for all, in addition to army service.

Regarding national security, Gantz vowed to "strengthen the settlement blocs and the Golan Heights, from which we will never retreat", also pledging that a "United Jerusalem" will forever remain Israel's capital. He said that the Jordan Valley should remain as the country's eastern security border, without allowing the Palestinians living beyond the separation barrier to "endanger our security and our identity as a Jewish state". He said he will strive for peace, mentioning the treaties with Egypt and Jordan, and commending prime ministers Menachem Begin, Yitzhak Rabin, and even his current rival Benjamin Netanyahu as "patriots". Gantz personally addressed Iranian general Qasem Soleimani and Hezbollah leader Hassan Nasrallah that he "will not tolerate a threat to Israeli sovereignty", and warned Hamas leader Yahya Sinwar, "I suggest you not test me again."

== Controversies ==
In early 2019, three victims of alleged sexual abuse criticised the Israel Resilience Party for hiring Ronen Tzur as a strategic advisor. Tzur was the media strategist behind a campaign to block the extradition of Malka Leifer, who faced 74 charges of sex abuse in Melbourne, Australia.

Eisenkot left the party in June 2025, in part, because the proposed leadership primary would not have been competitive.

== Leaders ==
Leader	Took office	Left office
Benny Gantz	2019	Incumbent

== Election results ==
Election	Leader	Votes	%	Seats	+/–	Status
Apr 2019	Benny Gantz	Within Blue and White		15 / 120	–	Snap election
Sep 2019	Benny Gantz	Within Blue and White		15 / 120	Steady	Snap election
2020	Benny Gantz	Within Blue and White		15 / 120	Steady	Coalition (Note: Israel Resilience was the only member in Blue and White to join the coalition, with the other members remaining in opposition)
2021	Benny Gantz	292,257	6.63 (#4)	8 / 120	▼7	Coalition
2022	Benny Gantz	Within National Unity		6 / 120	▼2	Opposition (2022–Oct 2023)
2022	Benny Gantz	Within National Unity		6 / 120	▼2	Coalition (Oct 2023–Jun 2024)
2022	Benny Gantz	Within National Unity		6 / 120	▼2	Opposition (Jun 2024–)
2026	Benny Gantz	Did not contest				Extra-parliamentary

== Knesset members ==
Knesset term	Seats	Members
21st (2019)	15	Benny Gantz, Gabi Ashkenazi, Avi Nissenkorn, Miki Haimovich, Michael Biton, Hili Tropper, Orit Farkash-Hacohen, Meirav Cohen, Asaf Zamir, Yizhar Shai, Omer Yankelevich, Gadeer Mreeh, Alon Schuster, Ram Shefa, Eitan Ginzburg
22nd (2019–2020)	15	Benny Gantz, Gabi Ashkenazi, Avi Nissenkorn, Miki Haimovich, Michael Biton, Hili Tropper, Orit Farkash-Hacohen, Meirav Cohen, Asaf Zamir, Yizhar Shai, Omer Yankelevich, Gadeer Mreeh, Alon Schuster, Ram Shefa, Eitan Ginzburg
23rd (2020–2021)	15	Benny Gantz, Gabi Ashkenazi, Avi Nissenkorn, Miki Haimovich, Michael Biton, Hili Tropper, Orit Farkash-Hacohen, Meirav Cohen, Asaf Zamir, Yizhar Shai, Omer Yankelevich, Gadeer Mreeh, Alon Schuster, Ram Shefa, Eitan Ginzburg
24th (2021–2022)	8	Benny Gantz, Pnina Tamano-Shata, Hili Tropper, Michael Biton, Orit Farkash-Hacohen, Alon Schuster, Eitan Ginzburg, Yael Ron Ben-Moshe
25th (2022–2026)	6	Benny Gantz, Pnina Tamano-Shata, Hili Tropper, Michael Biton, Orit Farkash-Hacohen, Alon Schuster (Note: After independents Gadi Eisenkot and Matan Kahana resigned from National Unity, Eitan Ginzburg and Yael Ron Ben-Moshe took over their Knesset positions)
