= Ministry of Cyber and National Digital Matters =

Government ministry of Israel

Agency overview
- Formed: 2020
- Dissolved: 2021
- Jurisdiction: Israel

The Ministry of Cyber and National Digital Matters was a ministry in the thirty-fifth government of Israel, responsible for the computing and the Governmental Companies Authority. The ministry was founded in 2020 and abolished in the thirty-sixth government of Israel.

== History ==
In April 2019 the CEO of the Ministry of Communications of Israel signed a strategic document, stating that the Ministry of Communications would no longer handle digital matters.

In 2020, after the 2019–20 Israeli political crisis the thirty-fifth government of Israel decided to establish a new ministry. Dudi Amsalem was nominated as a minister.

The Ministry was abolished following the establishment of the Thirty-sixth government of Israel.

== Structure ==
- Governmental Computing Authority
- Governmental Companies Authority

== Ministers ==
| # | Minister | Party | Term start | Term end | Government |
|---|---|---|---|---|---|
| 1 | Dudi Amsalem | Likud | May 17, 2020 | July 13, 2021 | Thirty-fifth government of Israel |
