= Blue and White (political alliance) =

Israeli political party

Blue and White כחול לבן
- Leader: Benny Gantz
- Founded: 21 February 2019
- Dissolved: 29 March 2020
- Succeeded by: Yesh Atid–Telem; Blue and White (party)
- Headquarters: Tel Aviv
- Ideology: Liberal Zionism
- Political position: Centre
- Member parties: Israel Resilience; Yesh Atid; Telem
- Colours: Blue; Dark blue White
- Slogan: Benny. Choosing Honesty. (2021)
- Most MKs: 35 (April 2019)

Election symbol
- פה (2019–2020) ف‌ه (2019–2020) כן (2021–) ك‌ن (2021–)

Website
- kachollavan.org.il

Blue and White (Hebrew: כָּחוֹל לָבָן, romanized: Kahol Lavan) was a centrist and liberal Zionist political alliance in Israel. It was established by the Israel Resilience Party, Yesh Atid and Telem to run in the April 2019 Knesset election, in hopes of defeating Prime Minister Benjamin Netanyahu. Blue and White defined itself as a pluralistic alliance representing all citizens on the political and religious spectrums. The phrase "blue and white" refers to the colors of the Israeli flag, and is colloquially used to describe something as being typically Israeli.

Following the March 2020 elections, Blue and White leader Benny Gantz was tasked with forming a new government after receiving endorsements from a majority of 61 MKs. Amidst the COVID-19 pandemic, Gantz instead opted to put himself forward as interim Speaker of the Knesset while continuing negotiations to form a coalition government with Benjamin Netanyahu's Likud and other parties.

Blue and White dissolved on 29 March 2020, with Yesh Atid and Telem splitting to form a separate faction called Yesh Atid–Telem. Israel Resilience Party kept the name "Blue and White" and joined the 35th government with Likud.

== History ==
Second logo of Blue and White, used during the 2021 election cycle

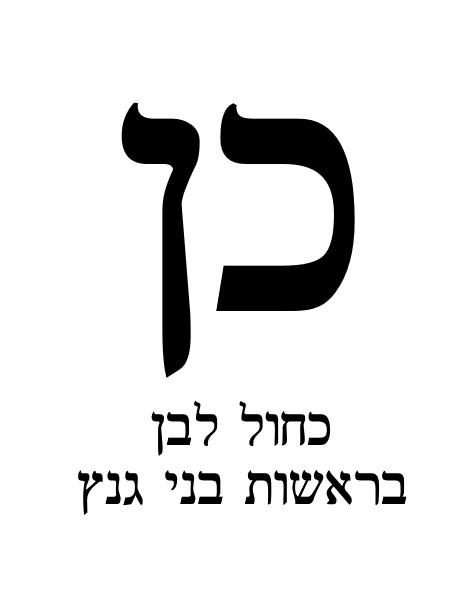
Ballot paper used by Blue and White during the 2021 election

On 21 February 2019, the last day for submitting election lists for the Knesset, Yesh Atid and Israel Resilience announced that they would form an alliance for the upcoming election. Gabi Ashkenazi, also a former chief of staff, would join the list in the fourth spot.

Blue and White won 35 seats in the April 2019 Israeli legislative election, the same as Likud, and conceded defeat. President Reuven Rivlin tasked Benjamin Netanyahu with forming a governing coalition, but failed, leading to new elections in September 2019.

In the September 2019 election, Blue and White won the election with 33 seats, one more than Likud, but Israeli President Reuven Rivlin first gave Netanyahu the chance to form the new government. Netanyahu was unable to form a government and President Rivlin gave the mandate to lead the process to Gantz, who was also unable to secure a coalition. Therefore, new elections were called for March 2020.

In the 2020 Israeli legislative election, Blue and White won 33 seats, placing it second after Likud which had 36. The alliance showed strong support in many areas, including Tel Aviv and Haifa. Following the election, the alliance became internally divided over whether to join in a unity government with Likud. Gantz was in favor, but Lapid and Ya'alon opposed.

On 29 March 2020, the alliance split up due to this difference, with Lapid and Ya'alon forming Yesh Atid–Telem, and Gantz eventually joining the 35th government with Netanyahu.

== Former composition ==
Name	Ideology	Position	Leader
Israel Resilience	Zionism	Centre to centre-right	Benny Gantz
Yesh Atid	Liberal Zionism; Secularism	Centre	Yair Lapid
Telem	Liberal Zionism; National liberalism	Centre to centre-right	Moshe Ya'alon

=== Israel Resilience Party ===
On 16 February 2015, Benny Gantz completed his term as Chief of Staff and began a three-year legal moratorium in which he could not run for the Knesset. This ended on 2 July 2018. In September 2018, it was reported that Gantz planned to enter politics. On 26 December 2018, the 20th Knesset voted to dissolve itself and hold early elections. A day later, on 27 December, after 109 people signed a list of founders, the party was officially registered with the name Israel Resilience Party.

=== Telem ===
In May 2016, "amidst wide-spread speculation that he would be fired by Netanyahu", Moshe Ya'alon resigned from his defense minister post. On 12 March 2017, Ya'alon officially relinquished his membership of Likud, announcing that he would form a new party to challenge Netanyahu in the next election. Ya'alon registered Telem on 2 January 2019. Telem announced an alliance with Israel Resilience on 29 January 2019.

=== Yesh Atid ===
Yesh Atid was founded by Yair Lapid in 2012, running on a platform representing the centre of Israeli society. In 2013, it placed second in the general election, winning 19 seats. It then entered into a coalition led by Benjamin Netanyahu's Likud. In the lead-up to the 2015 election, Lapid's campaign continued to emphasize economic issues, while heavily criticizing Netanyahu and his Likud party. Receiving 11 seats, they placed fourth and sat in the opposition.

== Platform and positions ==
On 25 February 2019, Lapid stated that the alliance wished to amend the Nation-State Bill, intending to add a civil equality article. Blue and White's manifesto was released on 6 March 2019. The document reveals positions on several policy areas, key among them a commitment to engage with peace-minded Arab neighbors and a willingness to enter into negotiations with the Palestinians, albeit without land concessions.

Policies included limiting the prime minister to eight years or three terms and preventing anyone convicted of a serious crime from being a public official. The alliance stated that they would return money previously taken by political parties in behind-the-scene deals and using it to reduce the cost of health care, education, and living. A diplomatic initiative for peace with the Palestinians was put forward. The alliance also supported the right of citizens to marry, divorce, parent, and be buried according to their specific beliefs, and the responsibility of all citizens to serve in the army, regardless of their religious levels.

During its March 2019 campaign, the alliance's platform included the following pledges:

- Governmental corruption: Impose term limits on the prime minister to a maximum of three terms or eight years. Indicted or convicted politicians would be barred from running for public office. Gantz abandoned that once he scrapped the bill to ban an indicted person from being given the Prime Ministerial mandate.
- Religion and state: The protection of the Jewish identity of the state, as well as the identities of all of its citizens. Civil marriage would be made permissible in some form, allowing people to marry according to their own beliefs. Enforce the 2016 agreement to create an expanded place for egalitarian prayers at the Western Wall, which had been suspended by the Netanyahu government. Gantz abandoned that plan once he entered into a Netanyahu-led government.
- Education: Investing in early education and kindergartens and subsidising daycare for young children. English and mathematics would be highly prioritized in elementary, middle, and high school.
- Health: Approximately 12.5 billion NIS (US$3.4 billion) would be invested in health care for all Israeli citizens. The alliance pledged to fight hospital closures and to increase access to medicine throughout the country, including the periphery. This was scrapped for a bigger spending bill to manage the COVID-19 pandemic.
- Economy: Shift to a focus on macroeconomics, seek to encourage innovation in STEM fields, and encourage more women and Hasidic Jews to enter the workforce.
- Israel-Palestinian conflict: On 7 March, in a speech to an English-speaking audience, Lapid laid out four conditions for a peace deal with the Palestinians. Those were later abandoned by Gantz when he entered the Netanyahu coalition and agreed to an annexation plan.
  - The Jordan Valley remaining in Israeli hands.
  - No Palestinian right of return.
  - Jerusalem remaining the undivided capital of Israel.

Political commentators have criticized Blue and White for its lack of clarity on core security issues, particularly its position on the Israeli–Palestinian conflict and West Bank settlements. Some analysts have described the party's platform as strategically vague, aimed at appealing to both center-left and center-right voters without committing to firm policy stances.

== Leaders ==
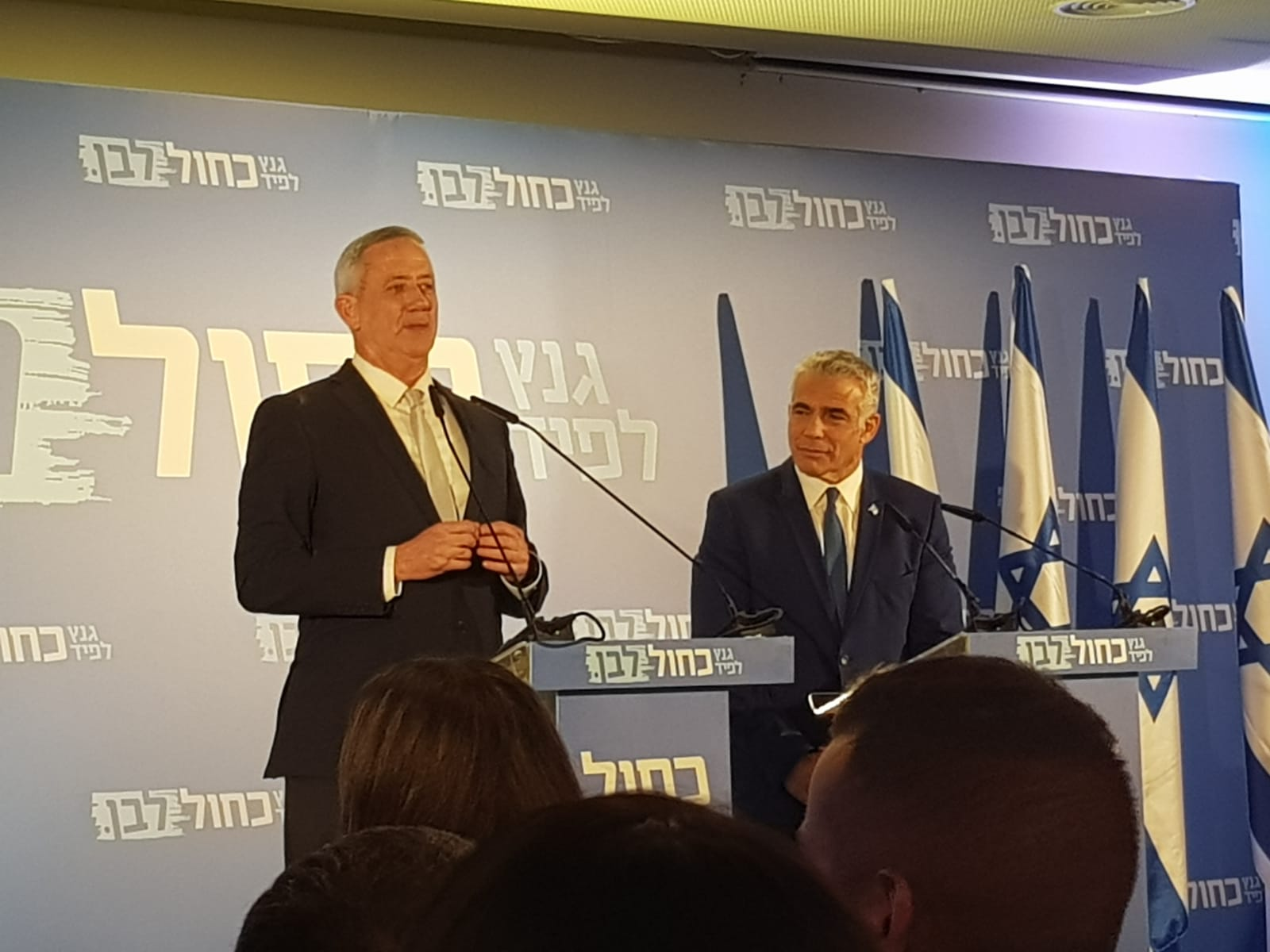
Benny Gantz and Yair Lapid

During the alliance, Benny Gantz and Yair Lapid served as co-leaders until the alliance ended in 2020.

During campaigning, there was also an agreement for party leadership in case the alliance succeeded in forming a government, where the main leaders would rotate positions. For the first two years, Gantz would be prime minister while Lapid would be foreign minister and Ya'alon as defence minister. Then for the next two years, Lapid would be prime minister and Gantz as defence minister.

Leader	Took office	Left office
Benny Gantz	2019	2020
Yair Lapid	2019	2020

== Election results ==
Election	Leader(s)	Votes	%	Seats	+/–	Status
Apr 2019	Benny Gantz; Yair Lapid	1,125,881	26.13 (#2)	35 / 120	▲24	Snap election
Sep 2019	Benny Gantz; Yair Lapid	1,151,214	25.95 (#1)	33 / 120	▼2	Snap election
2020	Benny Gantz; Yair Lapid	1,220,381	26.59 (#2)	33 / 120	Steady	Coalition (Note: The alliance split up after the 2020 election, with Israel Resilience joining the 35th government while Yesh Atid and Telem remained in opposition.)

== List of MKs ==
Knesset term	Seats	Faction	Members
21st (2019)	15	Israel Resilience	Benny Gantz, Gabi Ashkenazi, Avi Nissenkorn, Miki Haimovich, Michael Biton, Hili Tropper, Orit Farkash-Hacohen, Meirav Cohen, Asaf Zamir, Yizhar Shai, Omer Yankelevich, Gadeer Mreeh, Alon Schuster, Ram Shefa, Eitan Ginzburg
21st (2019)	15	Yesh Atid	Yair Lapid, Meir Cohen, Ofer Shelah, Orna Barbivai, Yael German, Karin Elharar, Yoel Razvozov, Elazar Stern, Mickey Levy, Pnina Tamano-Shata, Ram Ben Barak, Yoav Segalovitz, Boaz Toporovsky, Idan Roll, Yorai Lahav-Hertzanu
21st (2019)	5	Telem	Moshe Ya'alon, Yoaz Hendel, Zvi Hauser, Orly Fruman, Gadi Yevarkan
22nd (2019–2020)	15	Israel Resilience	Benny Gantz, Gabi Ashkenazi, Avi Nissenkorn, Miki Haimovich, Michael Biton, Hili Tropper, Orit Farkash-Hacohen, Meirav Cohen, Asaf Zamir, Yizhar Shai, Omer Yankelevich, Gadeer Mreeh, Alon Schuster, Ram Shefa, Eitan Ginzburg
22nd (2019–2020)	13	Yesh Atid	Yair Lapid, Meir Cohen, Ofer Shelah, Orna Barbivai, Yael German, Karin Elharar, Yoel Razvozov, Elazar Stern, Mickey Levy, Pnina Tamano-Shata, Ram Ben Barak, Yoav Segalovitz, Boaz Toporovsky
22nd (2019–2020)	5	Telem	Moshe Ya'alon, Yoaz Hendel, Zvi Hauser, Orly Fruman, Gadi Yevarkan
23rd (2020–2021)	15	Israel Resilience	Benny Gantz, Gabi Ashkenazi, Avi Nissenkorn, Miki Haimovich, Michael Biton, Hili Tropper, Orit Farkash-Hacohen, Meirav Cohen, Asaf Zamir, Yizhar Shai, Omer Yankelevich, Gadeer Mreeh, Alon Schuster, Ram Shefa, Eitan Ginzburg
23rd (2020–2021)	13	Yesh Atid	Yair Lapid, Meir Cohen, Ofer Shelah, Orna Barbivai, Yael German, Karin Elharar, Yoel Razvozov, Elazar Stern, Mickey Levy, Pnina Tamano-Shata, Ram Ben Barak, Yoav Segalovitz, Boaz Toporovsky
23rd (2020–2021)	5	Telem	Moshe Ya'alon, Yoaz Hendel, Zvi Hauser, Orly Fruman, Andrey Kozhinov
