= Gadeer Mreeh =

Israeli Druze journalist and politician

- غدير كمال مريح
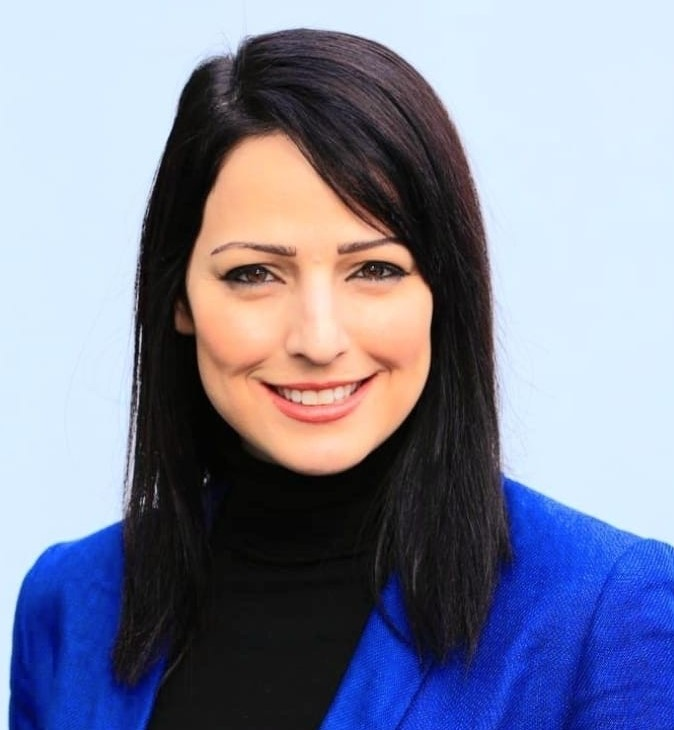

Faction represented in the Knesset
- 2019–2020: Blue and White
- 2020–2021: Yesh Atid

Personal details
- Born: 21 June 1984 (age 42) Daliyat al-Karmel, Israel

Gadeer Kamal-Mreeh (Arabic: غدير كمال مريح, Hebrew: ע'דִיר כַּמַאל מְרֵיח, [ʁaˈdiʁ kaˈmal m(a)ˈʁeχ], born 21 June 1984) is an Israeli Druze politician and journalist. She became the first Druze woman to anchor a Hebrew-language news program on Israeli television in 2017. In April 2019, she was elected to the Knesset as a member of the Blue and White alliance, making history as the first Druze woman to become a Member of the Knesset. She was subsequently elected to the Knesset as part of the Blue and White alliance in the September 2019 and March 2020 elections. She left Blue and White on 29 March 2020 and joined Yesh Atid. In June 2021, Kamal-Mreeh became the Jewish Agency's first Druze emissary to the US, based in Washington DC.

== Early life, family and education ==
Gadeer Kamal-Mreeh was born in Daliyat al-Karmel, a village on Mount Carmel, to a Druze family. Having an interest in journalism since her youth, she volunteered for a local TV station at age 12.

Kamal-Mreeh holds a degree with honors from Bar-Ilan University, in social science and medical imaging, and a master’s degree with honors in International Relations from University of Haifa, specializing in negotiations and making decisions in international relations.

== Career ==
=== Journalism ===
In 2011, Kamal-Mreeh was hired by the Israeli Public Broadcasting Corporation to host a program in Arabic, focusing on the social and cultural issues concerning Arab youth in Israel. In 2015, Kamal-Mreeh was selected to host Channel 33, the Israeli Broadcasting Corporation’s daily newscast in Arabic. In 2017, she began anchoring its main Hebrew Saturday evening newscast, as well as a nightly newscast, becoming the first non-Jewish anchorwoman to broadcast a main evening news in Hebrew language on the Channel 1 in Israel.

=== Politics and diplomacy ===
Prior to the April 2019 Knesset elections, Kamal-Mreeh joined the Israel Resilience Party, a member of the Blue and White alliance, and was placed 25th on the Blue and White list. When she joined the faction, she stated that one of her goals was to amend Israel's Nation-State Bill, which specifies the nature of the State of Israel as the nation-state of the Jewish people.

Kamal-Mreeh was elected to the Knesset when the Blue and White alliance won 35 seats in the election. She is the first Druze woman to become a Member of the Knesset.

During her tenure, she chaired the Caucus for Planning, Zoning and Industrial Areas, and the Caucus for the Advancement of Druze Women. She was a member of the Interior and Environment Committee, the Advancement of Women’s Status and Gender Equality Committee, and of the special committee for fighting crime within the Arab sector. Kamal Mreeh co-chaired the Israel-Germany friendship group and chaired the Israel-Switzerland parliamentary friendship group.

== Awards ==
Gadeer is a Munich Young Leaders Alumni and in 2021 was chosen by the World Economic Forum as one of the young global leaders.

In the same year Gadeer was also awarded the knight of Government Quality by The Movement for Quality Government in Israel.

== Personal life ==
She is married to Shadi Mreeh, an electrical and electronics engineer. They have two sons.

== See also ==
- List of Israeli Druze
- Women of Israel
