= Yulia Malinovsky =

Israeli politician and lawyer

- Malinovsky in 2026

Faction represented in the Knesset
- 2016–2018: Yisrael Beiteinu
- 2019–: Yisrael Beiteinu

Personal details
- Born: 5 September 1975 (age 51) Voroshilovgrad, Soviet Union

Yulia Malinovsky-Kunin (Hebrew: יוליה מלינובסקי-קונין, Russian: Юлия Малиновская, Yuliya Malinovskaya; born 5 September 1975) is an Israeli politician, lawyer and former local police officer. She is currently a member of the Knesset for Yisrael Beiteinu.

== Early life and education ==
Malinovsky was born in Voroshilovgrad in the Ukrainian SSR of the Soviet Union (today Luhansk in Ukraine). Her mother, Sophia, is Jewish, and her father, Vladimir, was of Russian, Greek and Armenian descent. She studied law at the Luhansk branch of the East Ukrainian Volodymyr Dahl National University, gaining a BA. She served in a local police force as a manpower officer. Malinovsky emigrated to Israel from Ukraine in 1998. Her younger sister had immigrated before her with NAALE in 1997, and the rest of her immediate family joined her in Israel later.

== Political career ==
Malinovsky was elected to Holon City Council on the Yisrael Beiteinu list in 2003. While serving on the Holon City Council, she filed a petition with the Supreme Court of Israel that challenged the existing municipal security tax. In 2010, the Supreme Court ended up ruling in her favour, which required the tax to be annulled nationwide. She was placed eighteenth on the party's list for the 2009 Knesset elections. However, the party won only 15 seats, and she failed to win election. She was 37th on the joint Likud–Yisrael Beiteinu list for the 2013 Knesset elections, but once again failed to win a seat.

Prior to the 2015 Knesset elections, she was placed ninth on the party's list. Although Yisrael Beiteinu won only six seats, the resignation of several MKs saw her enter the Knesset on 1 June 2016 as a replacement for Avigdor Lieberman, after he had resigned from the Knesset under the Norwegian Law following his appointment as Minister of Defense. After Lieberman resigned as Defence Minister in November 2018, he returned to the Knesset in place of Malinovsky.

Malinovsky was placed fifth on the Yisrael Beiteinu list for the April 2019 elections, and returned to the Knesset as the party won five seats. She was in fifth place again for the September 2019 elections, retaining her seat as Yisrael Beiteinu won eight seats. In 2023 Malinovsky called Prime Minister Benjamin Netanyahu a "traitor, a liar, and a fraudster", but apologized for her comments.

Starting in November 2023, after the October 7 attacks, she co-authored legislation with Simcha Rothman that enabled the prosecution of members of Nukhba forces who were deemed responsible for the attacks, which ended up being passed two and a half years later in 2026 with 93 votes in favour. In May 2024, Malinovsky authored a bill that, if approved, would designate the United Nations Relief and Works Agency for Palestine Refugees in the Near East (UNRWA) as a terrorist organization. In the bill's introduction, she wrote, "The purpose of this bill is to declare UNRWA as a terrorist organization for all intents and purposes as well as order the termination of the relations [and the cooperation] of the State of Israel with the agency, either directly or indirectly.” The bill was passed on 28 October 2024 with 92 votes in favour and 10 opposed. After the bill was passed, she later set up a parliamentary office at a former UNRWA compound, but was requested to leave by police.

== Personal life ==
Malinovsky lives in Holon, and is married with two children.
