= Gadi Yevarkan =

Israeli politician (born 1981)

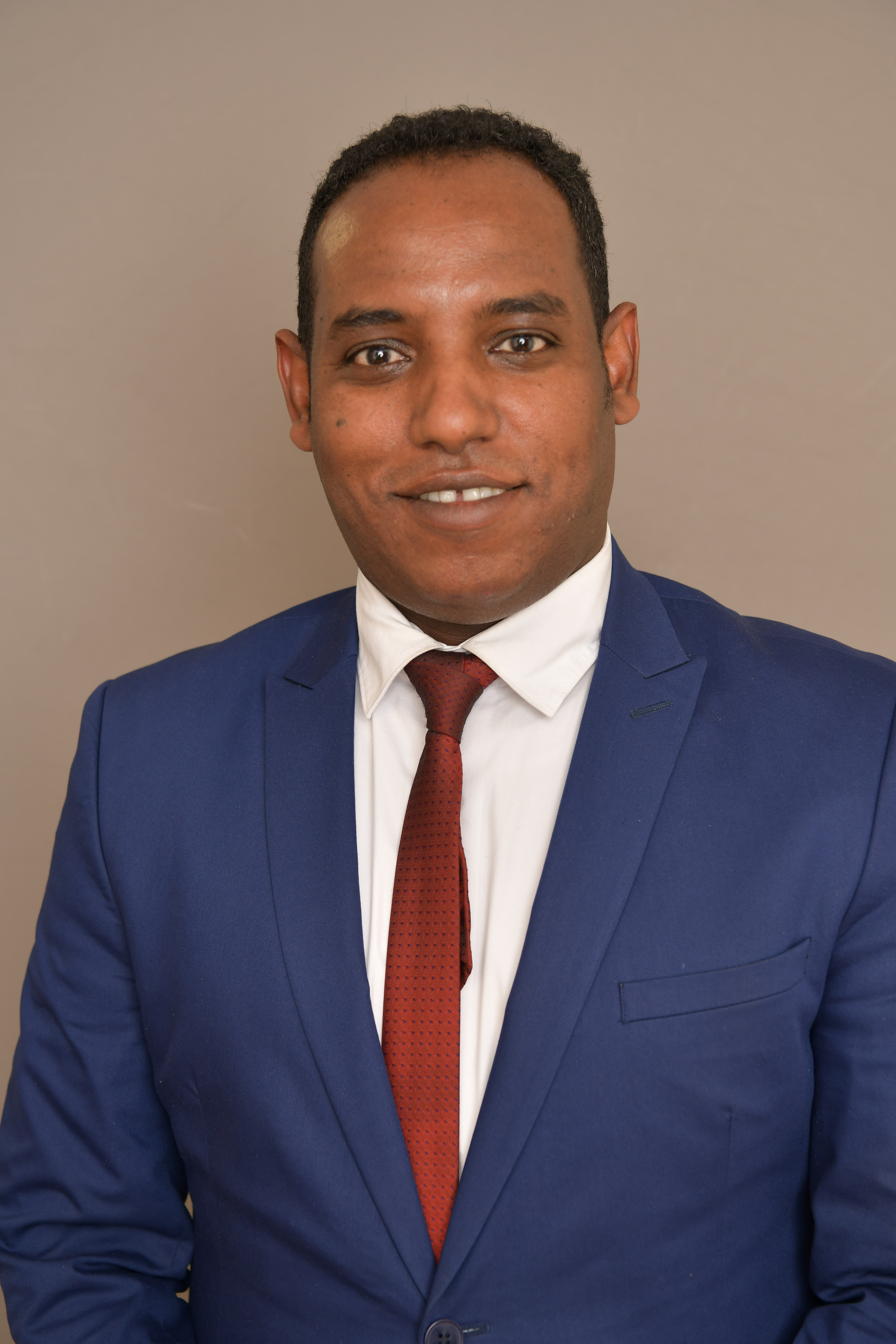
- Yevarkan in 2021

Faction represented in the Knesset
- 2019–2020: Blue and White
- 2020–2022: Likud

Personal details
- Born: 1 January 1981 (age 45) Simien, Gondar Province, Ethiopia

Desta "Gadi" Yevarkan (Hebrew: דֵסְטַה "גָּדִי" יִבַרקָן; born 1 January 1981) is an Israeli politician who served as Deputy Minister of Public Security from 2020 to 2021. He served as a Knesset member for the Blue and White alliance between 2019 and 2020. He became an MK for Likud in 2020 and served until 2022.

== Biography ==
Yevarkan was born in Simien village, located in the Simien Mountains of Ethiopia, the eldest of 17 children to Yengusa Ashtiya (born 1944) and Ashtiya Yevarakan (1911 – 2015). His mother was the sole woman on the village council while his father was a public servant. He attended a Hebrew-language school at the Israeli embassy in Addis Ababa beginning when he was seven years old. His family emigrated to Israel on 25 May 1991 as part of Operation Solomon, and initially settled in Tiberias before moving to a caravan site in kibbutz Hulda. He attended the Mikveh Israel boarding school, skipping a grade and graduating at age 16. For the next two years, he worked as a volunteer tutor at the social welfare office of Rehovot Subdistrict.

Although he did not receive a draft notice, Yevarkan went to Tel HaShomer to enlist in the Israel Defense Forces, and served in the reconnaissance unit of the Givati Brigade, reaching the rank of lieutenant. He subsequently studied for a bachelor's degree in law at the College of Management. In 2006, he and other Ethiopian Jews, including Pnina Tamano-Shata, founded the Office of the Struggle to Bring Ethiopian Jews to Israel activist group. Yevarkan is also engaged in anti-police brutality activism, criticizing the treatment of black Israelis by police and comparing their actions to those of law enforcement in the United States following the 2014 killing of Michael Brown and the 2020 murder of George Floyd.

Yevarkan ran for a place on the Likud list for the 2009 and 2013 Knesset elections, but was unsuccessful on both occasions. In the 2013 municipal elections he headed the Ethiopian immigrant-dominated Ahdut (Unity) list in Rehovot. In 2016 he founded the Be'eri Mechina.

In the build-up to the April 2019 elections Yevarkan joined the new Telem party. After the party became part of the Blue and White alliance, he was given the thirty-third slot on the joint list, and was subsequently elected to the Knesset as the alliance won 35 seats, and was re-elected in the September 2019 elections. However, prior to the March 2020 elections he was removed from the Blue and White list after threatening to defect to Likud. He was subsequently given the twentieth slot on the Likud list for the elections, and resigned from the Knesset. He was replaced as an MK by Yorai Lahav-Hertzanu. He served as Deputy Minister of Public Security under Amir Ohana.

In July 2020 Yevarkan proposed a housing project for recent Beta Israel immigrants. The plan was criticized as promoting segregation by fellow Ethiopian Jewish Knesset member Pnina Tamano-Shata. In August 2020, he tested positive for COVID-19, as the second cabinet member after Tamano-Shata. Yevarkan was opposed to restrictive measures for unvaccinated citizens during the COVID-19 pandemic, drawing parallels between the Green Pass system to prove vaccinations and the Holocaust.

He returned to the Knesset after the elections, as Likud won thirty-six seats. For the 2021 elections Yevarkan was placed seventeenth on the Likud list, and retained his seat in the Knesset, as Likud won thirty seats. However, he lost his seat in the 2022 elections after being placed 66th on the Likud list.

In July 2026 Yevarkan left Likud and announced the founding of a new right-wing party, Beit Yisrael. In the October 2026 Knesset elections Beit Yisrael ran on a joint ticket with Tzomet, receiving 0.1% of the vote and failing to win a seat.
