= Orit Farkash-Hacohen =

Israeli lawyer and politician

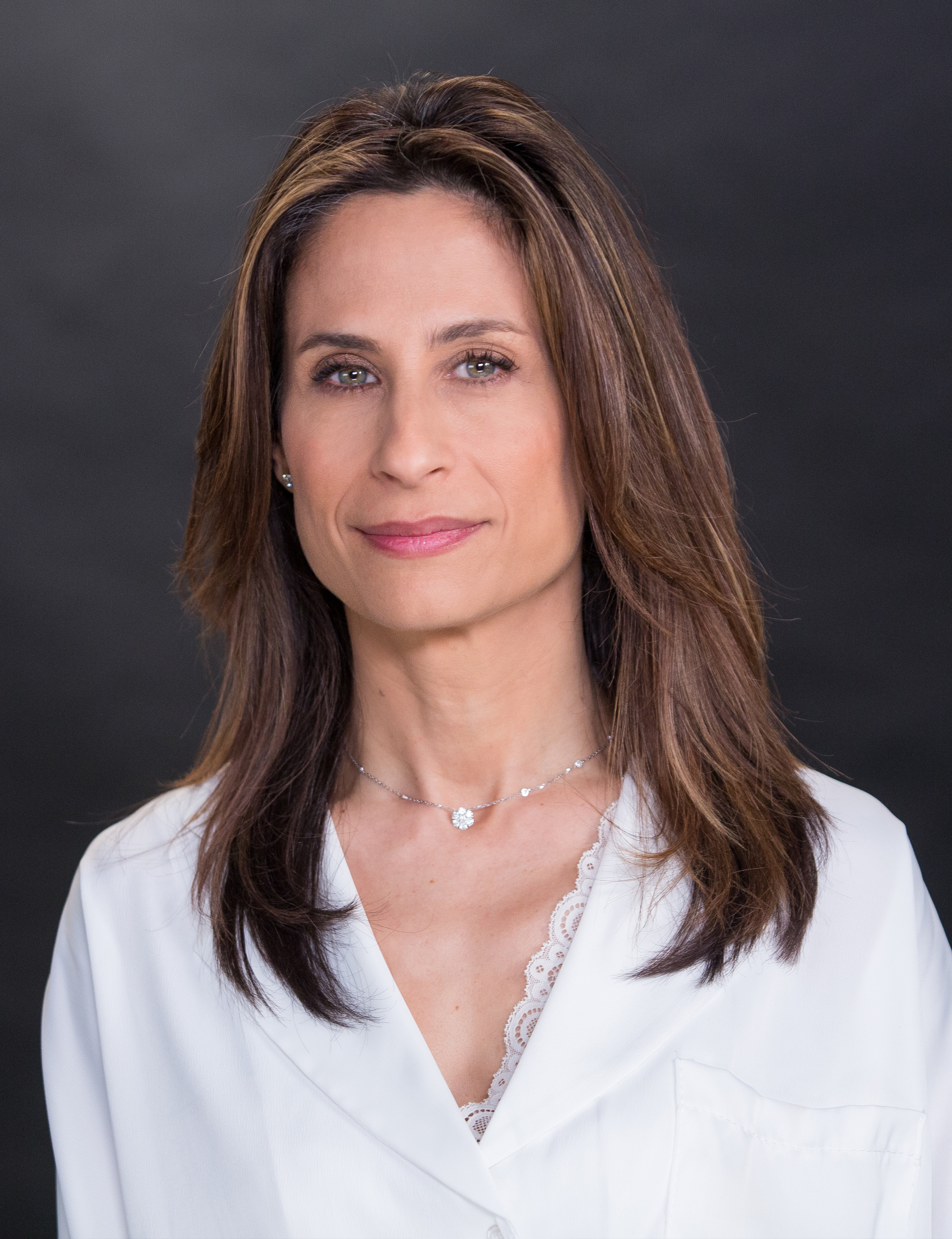
- Farkash-Hacohen in 2019

Ministerial roles
- 2020: Minister of Strategic Affairs
- 2020–2021: Minister of Tourism
- 2021–2022: Minister of Science, Technology and Space

Faction represented in the Knesset
- 2019–2020: Blue and White
- 2021: Blue and White
- 2022–2026: National Unity
- 2026–: Yashar

Personal details
- Born: 29 December 1970 (age 55) Petah Tikva, Israel

Orit Farkash-Hacohen (Hebrew: אוֹרִית פַרְקָשׁ־הַכֹּהֵן; born 29 December 1970) is an Israeli lawyer and politician who currently serves as a member of the Knesset for Yashar and previously served as a member of the Knesset for National Unity. She has previously served as Minister of Science, Technology and Space, Minister of Strategic Affairs and Minister of Tourism, and as chairwoman of the Electricity Authority.

== Biography ==
Farkash-Hacohen was born in Petah Tikva to Michael Farkash and Shoshana Farkash (née Messenberg). She grew up in Ashdod and attended the Amana school in Kfar Saba. She performed her national service in the Sha'arei Tzedek Medical Center in Jerusalem. After completing her service, she studied for an LLB at the Hebrew University of Jerusalem. Following an internship in the district and supreme courts with Dalia Dorner, she worked at E.S. Shimron, I. Molho, Persky & Co as a lawyer. After five years at the firm, she left to join the Antitrust Authority, becoming head of the litigation team.

In 2003 Farkash-Hacohen became a legal advisor to the Electricity Authority. Between 2006 and 2007 she attended Harvard University, earning a master's degree in public administration, as part of the Wexner Foundation's Fellowship. She was appointed temporary chair of the Electricity Authority in September 2011, and was given the job permanently the following March. She was dismissed by the government in 2015 after speaking out against the country's natural gas monopoly, with the Movement for Quality Government submitting a petition against the move to the High Court. In 2017 she joined Goldfarb Seligman & Co. as head of the Department of Energy, Regulation and Infrastructure.

Farkash-Hacohen joined the new Israel Resilience Party in 2019. After the party joined the Blue and White alliance for the April 2019 Knesset elections, she was given the fifteenth slot on the joint list. She was subsequently elected to the Knesset as the alliance won 35 seats. She was re-elected in September 2019 and March 2020. In May 2020 she was appointed Minister of Strategic Affairs in the new government. Following her appointment, she resigned her Knesset seat under the Norwegian Law. In light of Asaf Zamir's resignation from the government, in October 2020 Farkash-Hacohen left the Ministry of Strategic Affairs to replace Zamir as Minister of Tourism. She was re-elected to the Knesset in the March 2021 elections and appointed Minister of Science, Technology and Space in the thirty-sixth government. She subsequently resigned from the Knesset again and was replaced by Ruth Wasserman Lande.

Farkash-Hacohen announced on 24 July 2025 that she would be leaving Blue and White, though she will not resign her Knesset seat, as doing would have allowed a member of New Hope to gain the seat through the Norwegian Law because the two parties ran on the same list in the 2022 election. She became a member of the Yashar party soon afterwards. In September 2026 Farkash-Hacohen was placed third on Yashar's slate.

She chairs the Knesset Subcommittee on Artificial Intelligence and Advanced Technologies.
