= Michael Biton =

Israeli politician

- מִיכָאֵל בִּיטוֹן
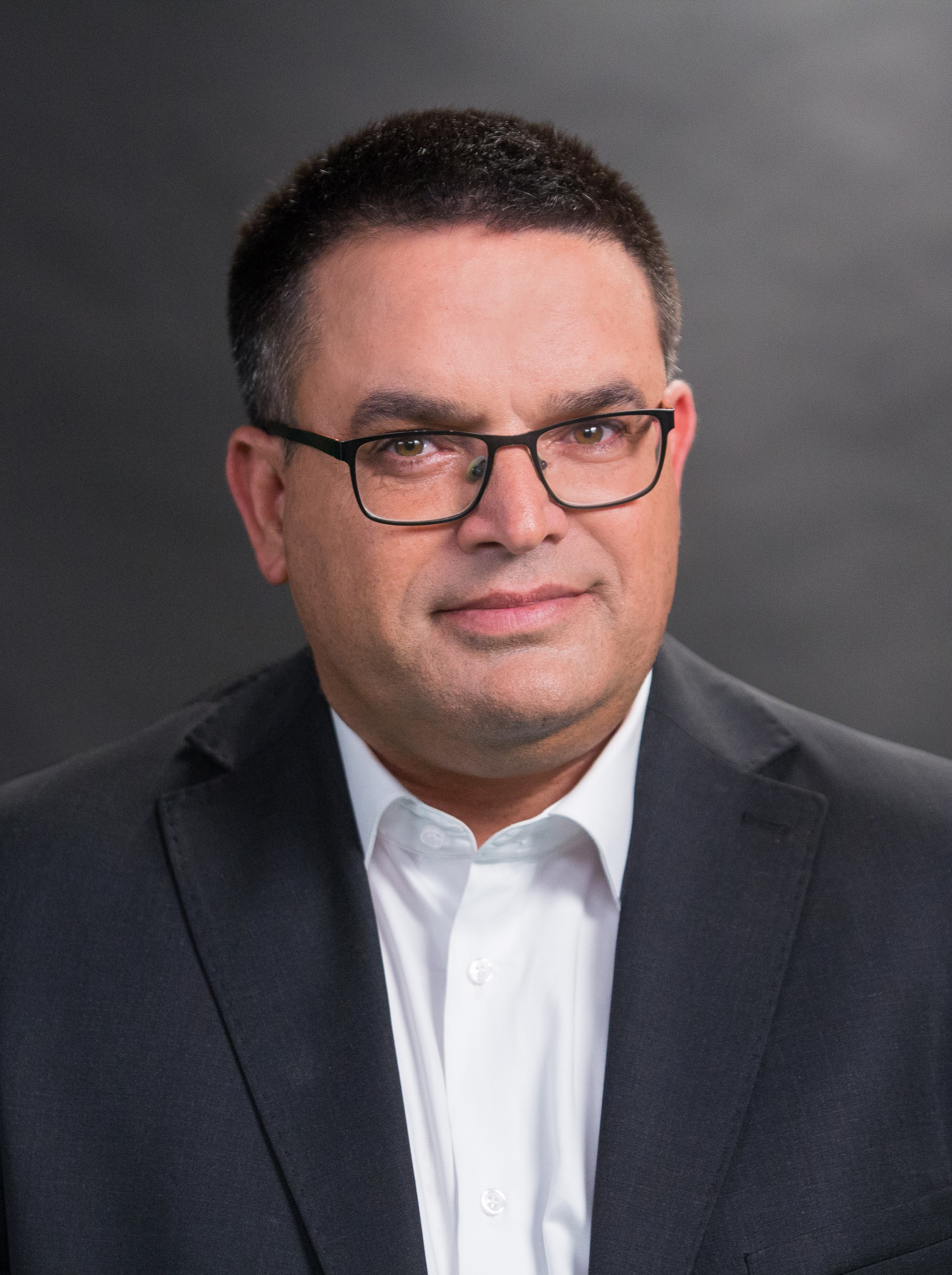

Ministerial roles
- 2020–2021: Minister of Strategic Affairs
- 2020–2021: Minister in the Defense Ministry

Faction represented in the Knesset
- 2019–2020: Blue and White
- 2021–2022: Blue and White
- 2022–2026: National Unity

Personal details
- Born: 3 February 1970 (age 56) Yeruham, Israel

Michael Mordecai Biton (Hebrew: מִיכָאֵל מָרְדְּכַי בִּיטוֹן, born 3 February 1970) is an Israeli politician. He served as Minister of Strategic Affairs and as minister for civic issues within the Ministry of Defense. He was mayor of Yeruham between 2010 and 2018.

== Biography ==
Biton was born in Yeruham to parents who had immigrated from Morocco. He gained a BA in behavioral studies and Hebrew literature from Ben-Gurion University of the Negev and an MA in organizational leadership from the Hebrew University of Jerusalem. He also studied English at Yale University. After his return, he headed a community center in Yeruham, managed the Jewish Agency's Beersheba District, and founded the nonprofit organisation Youth of Yeruham.

He was elected mayor of Yeruham as a Kadima candidate in November 2010 with 44% of the vote. In 2014 he was re-elected with 70% of the vote. He later joined the Labor Party, and was a leader of the national "Equality March" which started in Yeruham. In 2015 he was runner-up in the vote to become the head of the Israeli branch of the Jewish National Fund, 238 votes behind the victor, Labor MK Danny Atar.

In the buildup to the April 2019 Knesset elections he worked with Adina Bar-Shalom to form a new political party called Ahi Yisraeli. However, he left the party due to a leadership dispute with Bar-Shalom. He subsequently joined the new Israel Resilience Party, which became part of the Blue and White alliance for the elections. Biton was elected to the Knesset on its list, and re-elected in the September 2019 and 2020 elections. In May 2020 he was appointed Minister in the Ministry of Defense in the new government. He subsequently resigned his Knesset seat under the Norwegian Law and was replaced by Tehila Friedman. He was re-elected to the Knesset in the March 2021 elections and the 2022 elections.

Biton announced ahead of the 2026 elections that he would not run with the party and was considering establishing his own.
