= Omer Yankelevich =

Israeli attorney and politician

- עוֹמֶר יַנְקֵלֵבִיץ׳
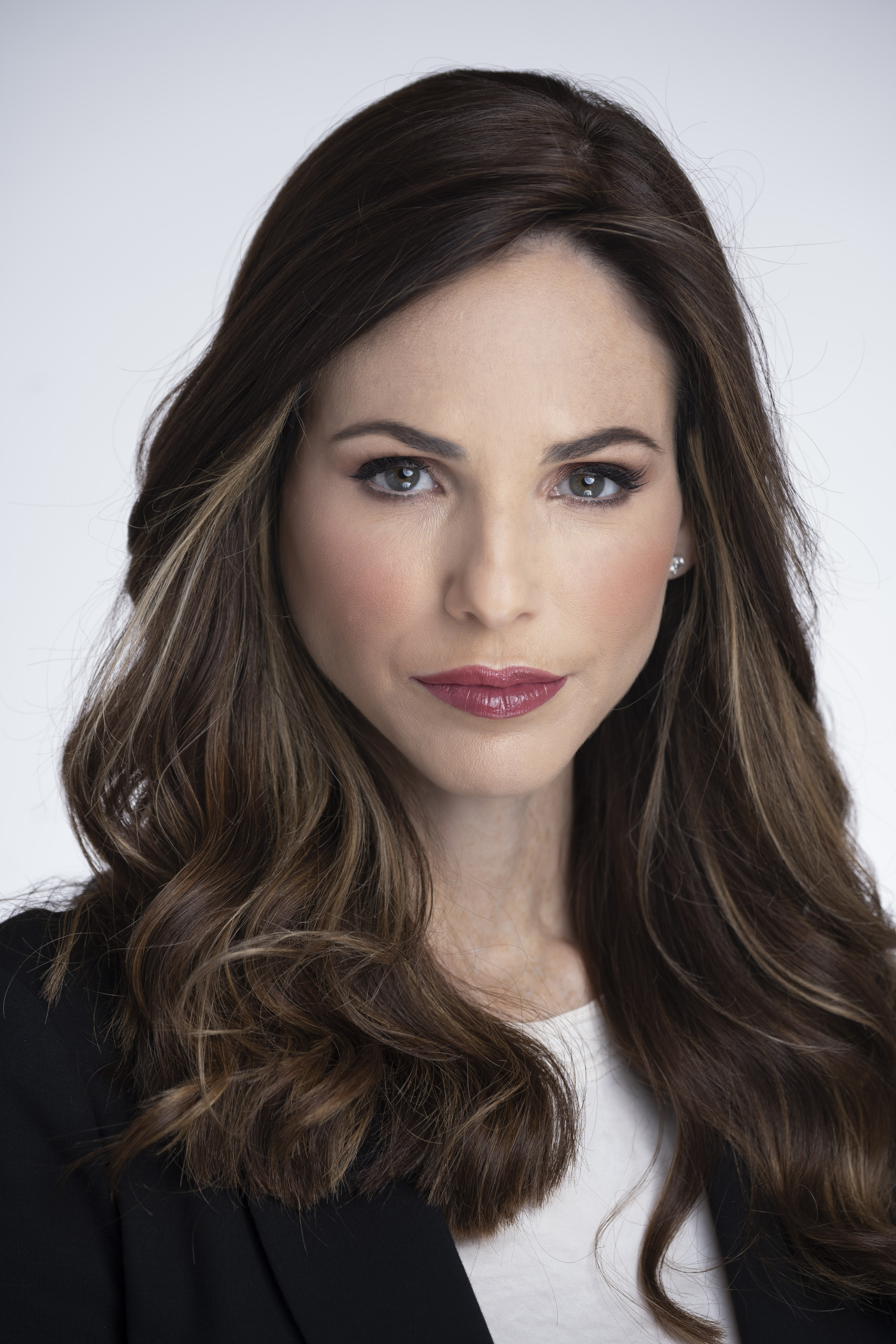

Ministerial roles
- 2020–2021: Minister of Diaspora Affairs

Faction represented in the Knesset
- 2019–2021: Blue and White

Personal details
- Born: 25 May 1978 (age 48) Tel Aviv, Israel
- Education: Ono Academic College

Omer Yankelevich (Hebrew: עוֹמֶר יַנְקֵלֵבִיץ׳; born 25 May 1978) is an Israeli attorney, educator, social activist, and politician. She was the Minister of Diaspora Affairs and was a Member of the Knesset for the Blue and White from 2019 to 2021. She is a co-founder of the "Just Begun Foundation", which sponsors social initiatives to help integrate peripheral and marginalized populations in Israel, with an emphasis on the Haredi sector. In 2019, she joined the Israel Resilience Party, which is part of the Blue and White political alliance, and was placed #23 on the faction's list for the April 2019 Knesset election. The Blue and White alliance gained 35 seats in the election, resulting in Yankelevich becoming a Member of the Knesset. She was subsequently elected to the Knesset as part of the Blue and White alliance in the September 2019 and March 2020 elections. In the national unity government which comprised the thirty-fifth government of Israel, Yankelevich was named Minister of Diaspora Affairs, becoming the first-ever Haredi woman cabinet minister.

== Early life and education ==
Omer Galinsky was born on 25 May 1978 to a secular family in Tel Aviv. She was named for her birthdate on the Jewish calendar, which coincided that year with the Jewish holiday of Lag BaOmer. She has one younger brother. Her father, Yaakov (Yasha) Galinsky, a native of Lithuania, was an actor in the Habima Theatre, and later became a ba'alat teshuva. Her mother was born in Latvia. During her youth, her parents volunteered in the Jewish communities in the Soviet Union, and at age 16, she taught Hebrew and Judaism in Russia and Ukraine.

She attended Bais Yaakov for her elementary schooling, and went on to attend the Rabbi Wolf Teachers Seminary in Bnei Brak. She received a teaching certificate at the Gateshead seminary for women and completed additional courses at the Shecheransky Seminary in Tel Aviv. Later, she took English teaching courses at the University of Cambridge. She graduated from Ono Academic College with a bachelor's of law (LL.B) with honors, and from Bar-Ilan University with a master's in law (LL.M) with distinction.

== Career ==
She has practiced law since 2007. After passing the Bar, she worked as a legal assistant to a judge in the Jerusalem District Court for 13 years. She then became Chief of Staff of the Ministry for Social Equity. In her legal practice, she specializes in government relations and copyright.

Yankelevich has taught at the Takhkemoni School in Rehovot and the Bat-Zion high school in Jerusalem.

Yankelevich is a co-founder of the "Just Begun Foundation" (Hebrew: קרן רק התחלנו), which sponsors social initiatives to help integrate peripheral and marginalized populations, with an emphasis on the Haredi sector. Among the group's initiatives are the opening of an art gallery showcasing Haredi artists in a Tel Aviv flea market, and projects in theatre, film, media, and plastics and visual arts. Yankelevich has defended the Haredi population against the Israel Women's Network and other liberal feminist groups that vilify it for its enactment of gender separation in institutes of higher learning and at public events.

== Political career ==
In 2019, Yankelevich was chosen by Benny Gantz to be a member of his Israel Resilience Party, which was part of the Blue and White political alliance for the April 2019 Israeli legislative election. She was placed #23 on the faction's list. Her appointment was seen as an attempt by Gantz to present the party's political orientation as centrist, rather than left, although her presence was not expected to pull in Haredi votes.

With the Blue and White alliance gaining 35 seats in the election, Yankelevich became a Member of the Knesset.

In the national unity government of the thirty-fifth government of Israel, Gantz appointed Yankelevich to serve as Minister of Diaspora Affairs, thus becoming the first-ever Haredi woman cabinet minister. She did not run for re-election in the 2021 elections.

Yankelevich sponsored a Knesset bill to require consultation with Diaspora on matters regarding world Jewry. During the COVID-19 pandemic, she led a rule change in Israel's entry policy, to allow visits of families of new immigrants.

== Personal life ==
Yankelevich is a Haredi Jew. She and her husband, Yaron, have five children, and reside in Beit Shemesh. She speaks Hebrew, English, Russian and basic Yiddish.

She is involved in strategy consulting and public relations as well as counseling leaders in geopolitical matters.
