= Yael German =

Israeli politician (born 1947)

- German in 2012

Ministerial roles
- 2013–2014: Minister of Health

Faction represented in the Knesset
- 2013–2019: Yesh Atid
- 2019–2020: Blue and White

Personal details
- Born: 4 August 1947 (age 79) Haifa, Mandatory Palestine

Yael German (Hebrew: יעל גרמן; born 4 August 1947) is an Israeli politician and diplomat who served as a member of the Knesset for Yesh Atid and the Blue and White alliance between 2013 and 2020. She was minister of health between 2013 and 2014 and mayor of Herzliya between 1998 and 2013. German was appointed as the Israeli ambassador to France in 2021 but resigned in 2022.

== Early life ==
German was born in Haifa to Jewish parents from Romania and Poland. As a child, her family moved to Ramat Gan. When she was nine years old, she moved with her family to Istanbul for a year, where her father was employed. She was married at the age of 19, due to which she did not serve in the Israel Defense Forces. She studied at the Levinsky College for Teaching Education and was certified as a teacher. She studied at the Tel Aviv University, gaining a bachelor's degree in history .She had two children. She has lived in Herzliya since 1979.

In 1980, she founded an adult education center in Herzliya which she managed until 1987 and was awarded a prize for in 1986. Between 1987 and 1994 she managed an electronics factory. Later, she served as joint CEO of Consultants for Mass Communication alongside Yariv Ben Eliezer.

== Career ==
In 1988 she joined the Shinui Party led by Amnon Rubinstein. When it merged with the newly created Meretz party, she joined and stayed with the party, becoming the chairwoman of the Herzliya branch.

=== Mayor of Herzliya ===
In 1993, she became a member of the Herzliya Municipal Council for Meretz. In 1998, she was elected mayor of the city, and in 2003, she was elected for a second term with 56% of the vote. Whilst mayor she fought the Cellular Companies Forum that wanted to increase the number of cellular antennas in the city. Eventually, her fight succeeded when the Knesset passed the Cellular Antenna Law. German founded the Herzliya Ensemble Theater. In 2006 she showed solidarity with the struggle to hold a Gay Pride Parade in Jerusalem and called upon all Israeli cities to hold Pride parades. She removed fluoride from Herzliya's drinking water.

=== 19th Knesset ===
Prior to the 2013 Knesset elections, she joined the new Yesh Atid party, and was elected to the Knesset. When a new government was formed, she was appointed minister of health.

German worked closely with the non-Jewish population in Israel, and showed a liberal attitude towards interfaith marriages. She advocated for Arab residents of Gaza to be able to cross the border to visit Arab-Israeli family members.

=== Minister of health 2013–2014 ===
German became minister of health several months after the 2013 elections. Served as a member of the Ministerial Committee for Legislative Affairs. German's first decision as health minister was to reexamine the section in the blood donor questionnaire that prohibits gay men who have had sex with other men from donating blood in Israel.

In 2013, German helped establish the National Council for the Prevention of Suicide. They worked to prevent suicide in public spaces by making them safer as well as training professionals in mental health counseling. German worked to open a psychiatric clinic for immigrants from Sudan and Eritrea. She promoted the launch of a project to subsidize drug treatment for asylum seekers with HIV and AIDS.

In 2014 German banned phosphate mining in Sde Brir near Arad.

In 2014 German ended Israel's fluoridation of drinking water which had been used in large Israeli towns since the 1970s. The People's Health Regulations were updated in 2001 to make it mandatory for localities with populations over 5,000 residents to have fluoride in their water. German previously removed fluoride from Herzliya's tap water when she served as mayor in the 1990s. The change was met with backlash from the public and health care professionals. She was sued in the Supreme Court in 2014 over the issue. German ordered the Ministry of Health to cancel the expansion of dental treatments for children, which were supposed to come into effect in July 2013. The subsequent minister of health ordered the previously agreed upon dentals coverage for children to move forward. The new health minister also ordered the return of fluoride to drinking water in 2016. German went to the Supreme Court to prevent its reintroduction, but lost. In 2022, the Israel Journal of Health Policy Research released a study titled The effect of community water fluoridation cessation on children's dental health: a national experience which concluded that lack of fluoride in the water caused a surge in tooth decay, especially in children. The paper stated, "Our results clearly show the benefits of CWF in maintaining pediatric dental health. It seems that CWF was stopped for political reasons, and the lack of fluoride has led to an increase in dental problems which can cause systemic health issues." As of 2024, fluoride has not been reintroduced to Israeli water due to budgetary concerns.

In 2014, German resigned from the government, along with other Yesh Atid ministers following the dismissal of the party leader from the position of minister of finance.

=== 20th Knesset ===
She was placed third on the party's list for the 2015 elections, and was re-elected as the party won 11 seats. She served as a member of the Environmental Protection Committee and the Law, Constitution and Law Committee. In addition, she headed the Lobby for Public Health, the Lobby for Animal Rights and the Lobby for the Gay Community. She served as a member of the Lobby for the Strengthening and Development of the Arab Economy. She was ranked 2nd place by The Proud Front in Members of Knesset acting for the benefit of the gay community.

=== The 21st Knesset ===
In 2019 she placed fifth on the Yesh Atid list which then joined with the Blue and White party. She retired in 2020 for health reasons.

=== Ambassador to France ===
In 2021 German was appointed by Foreign Minister Yair Lapid as the Israeli ambassador to France. In 2022 she resigned in protest.
