= Meir Cohen (politician) =

Israeli politician

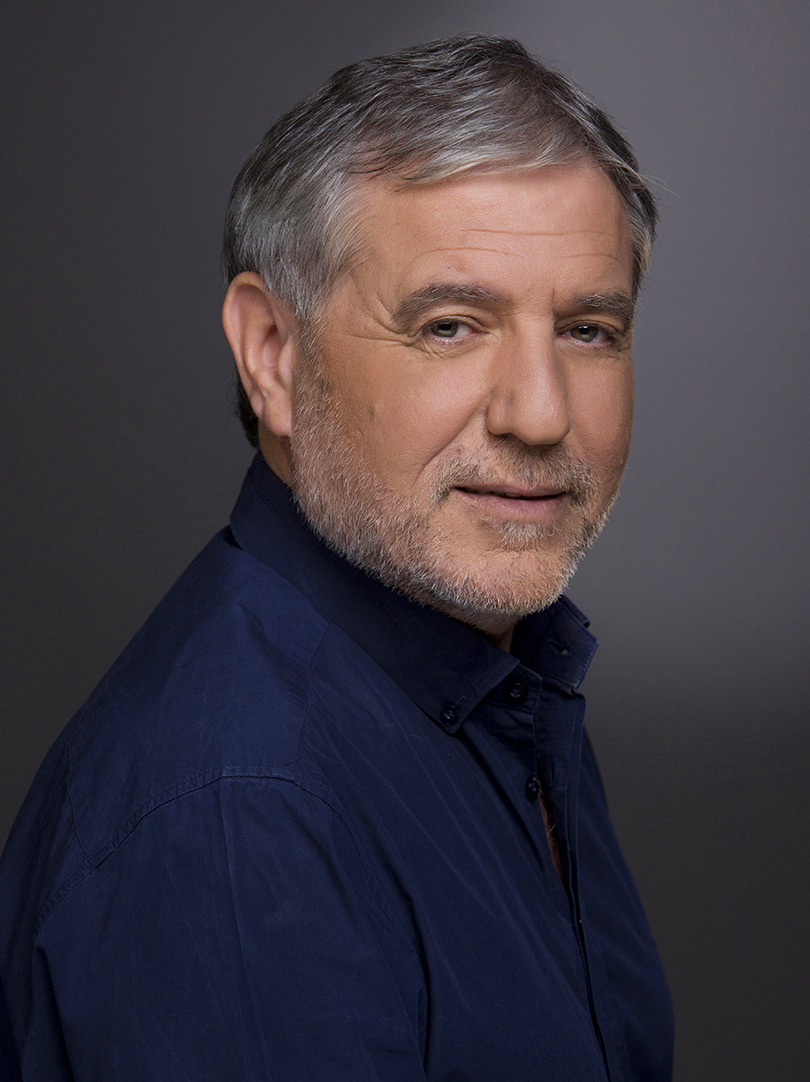
- Cohen in 2012

Ministerial roles
- 2013–2014: Minister of Social Affairs and Social Services
- 2021–2022: Minister of Welfare and Social Affairs

Faction represented in the Knesset
- 2013–2019: Yesh Atid
- 2019–2020: Blue and White
- 2020–2026: Yesh Atid

Personal details
- Born: 15 November 1955 (age 71) Essaouira, Morocco

Meir Cohen (Hebrew: מֵאִיר כֹּהֵן; born 15 November 1955) is an Israeli politician who served as a member of the Knesset for Yesh Atid from 2013 to 2026. A former mayor of Dimona, Cohen served as Minister of Welfare and Social Affairs from 2013 to 2014, and again from 2021 to 2022. He has also served as Deputy Speaker of the Knesset since October 2015.

== Biography ==
Born in Essaouira in Morocco, Cohen's family immigrated in 1962 when he was seven. After initially settling in Yeruham, they moved to Dimona and were one of its founding families. He studied at the Lehman school in Dimona. In 1973, Cohen was drafted into the Israel Defense Forces, joined the Paratroopers Brigade, and fought in the Yom Kippur War. He attended Ben-Gurion University of the Negev where he gained a bachelor's degree in history. Cohen earned a master's degree in Jewish Studies after graduating from the Schechter Institute in Jerusalem. He later worked as a headteacher in Dimona.

His sister, Ruti Shitrit, is a publicist and the wife of former minister Meir Shitrit.

He joined Yisrael Beiteinu and ran for mayor of Dimona in 2003, winning the election with 42% of the vote. He was elected for a second term in 2008, and was expected to win a third term in 2013. During his tenure numerous factories opened, the city's first mall was built, unemployment dropped, he built cultural and youth centers, and led the efforts to lower the price of water. In October 2012 he joined Yesh Atid after being courted by the party for several months.

In addition to serving as mayor of Dimona, Cohen was also a member of the board of directors of the Jewish Agency.

In the lead-up to the 2013 Knesset elections Cohen was placed fourth on the list of the new Yesh Atid party, entering the Knesset as the party won 19 seats. He was appointed Minister of Welfare and Social Services, a post he held until resigning on 2 December 2014. He was placed fourth on the party's list for the 2015 elections, and was re-elected as the party won 11 seats.

During his tenure as Minister of Welfare, Cohen initiated the establishment of the Alalouf Committee to examine poverty in Israel, and led a 2018 amendment to the Welfare Services Law that expanded the definition of a person "in need" to include those requiring assistance due to poverty.

In the 2021 elections, Cohen was placed third on the list of the Yesh Atid party, which ran separately from Blue and White this time. Following the elections, a new government was established by the Yesh Atid and Yamina parties, and Cohen was reappointed as the Minister of Welfare and Social Services. He held the position until December 2022, when the next government was established by Likud and Yesh Atid returned to opposition.

In October 2025, Cohen was named as Yesh Atid’s candidate to serve as Chairman of the Jewish National Fund. However, his candidacy was withdrawn after Yesh Atid withdrew the party from national institutions citing "a culture of corruption" at the organizations.

On 31 August 2026, Cohen announced that he will not run for reelection in the 2026 election because he is "making room for the next generation".

== Personal life ==
Cohen lives in Modi'in with his wife Naama; they have three sons and five grandchildren.
