= Pnina Tamano-Shata =

Israeli politician (born 1981)

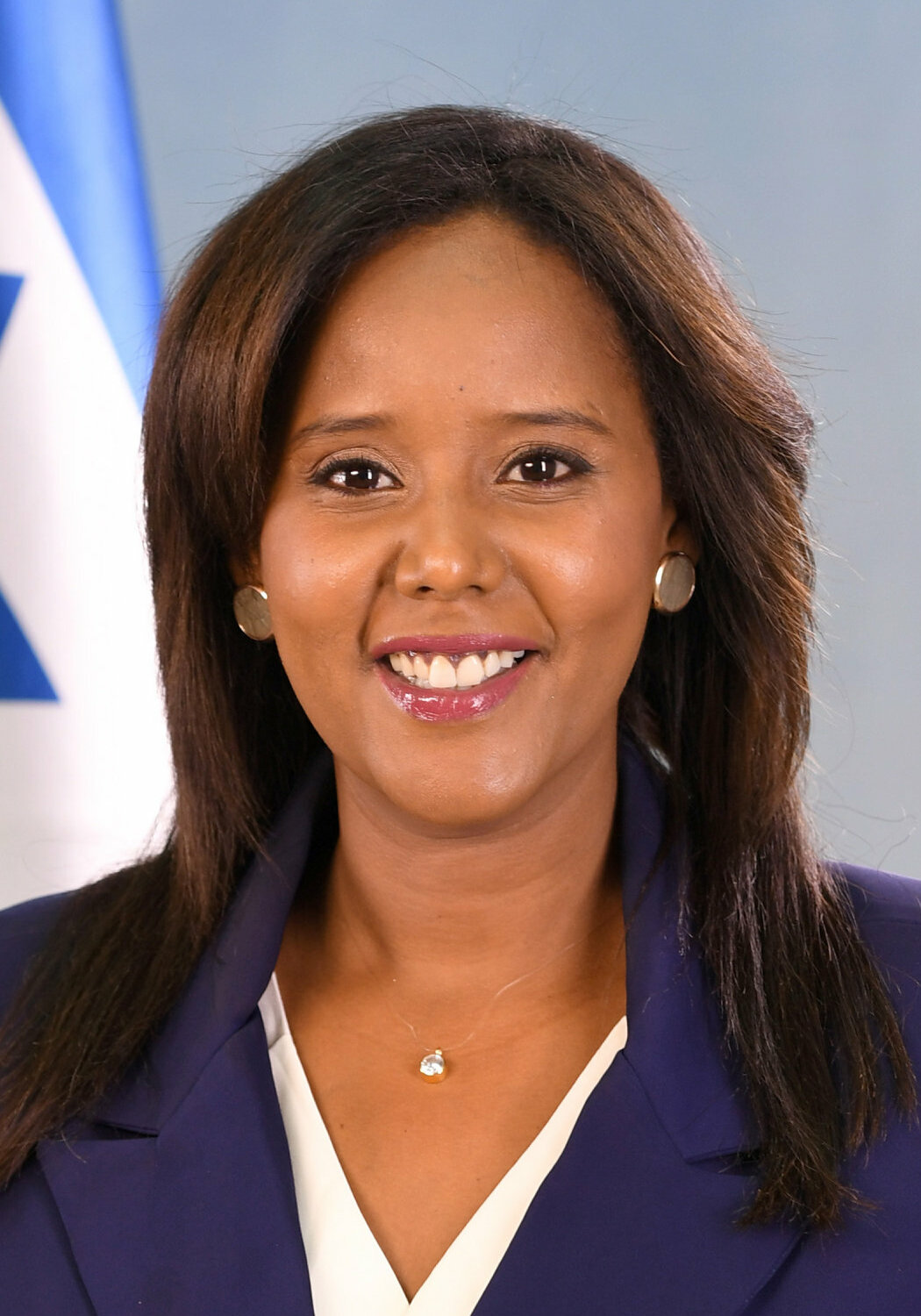
- Tamano-Shata in 2020

Ministerial roles
- 2020–2022: Minister of Immigrant Absorption

Faction represented in the Knesset
- 2013–2015: Yesh Atid
- 2018–2019: Yesh Atid
- 2019–2021: Blue and White
- 2022–2026: National Unity

Personal details
- Born: 1 November 1981 (age 45) Wuzaba, Gondar, Ethiopia

Pnina Tamano-Shata (Hebrew: פְּנִינָה תַּמֶנוֹ־שֶׁטֶה; born 1 November 1981) is an Israeli lawyer, journalist, and politician. The first Ethiopian-born woman to enter the Knesset in 2013, in 2020 she also became the first Ethiopian-born Israeli cabinet member after being appointed Minister of Immigrant Absorption.

== Early life ==
Tamano-Shata was born in Wuzaba, a village located near the city of Gondar in the Amhara Region of northern Ethiopia. She is the granddaughter of Kahen Maharat Shata, a prominent spiritual leader of Ethiopian Jews. Her family immigrated to Israel when she was three during the evacuation of the Ethiopian Jews from Sudan named Operation Moses. She, her four siblings, and her father Menashe were among almost 7,000 Ethiopian Jews airlifted out of the country by Mossad to Israel between November 1984 and January 1985. Her mother Mazal and two sisters arrived in Israel in December 1985.

She studied law at Ono Academic College at Kiryat Ono in the Tel Aviv District, and became Deputy Chairman of the national Ethiopian Student Association.

From 2007 to 2012 she worked as a reporter for Channel 1.

== Political career ==
Prior to the 2013 Knesset elections Tamano-Shata joined the new Yesh Atid party. Placed 14th on the party's list, she became a Knesset member as the party won 19 seats. She was placed 13th on the party's list for the 2015 elections, but lost her seat as the party was reduced to 11 seats.

On 9 February 2018, she returned to the Knesset as a replacement for Ya'akov Peri, who had resigned following allegations that he had leaked information during a corruption investigation twenty years beforehand. Prior to the April 2019 elections, Yesh Atid became part of the Blue and White, with Tamano-Shata placed 24th on the alliance's list. She was re-elected as Blue and White won 35 seats. She was re-elected again in the September 2019 elections. Following the March 2020 elections, she was appointed Minister of Aliyah and Integration, also known as Minister of Immigrant Absorption, becoming the first Ethiopia-born minister in the Israeli government. She was officially sworn in on 17 May 2020.

In June 2021 Tamano-Shata was awarded the Magen Begin Prize for Israeli Leadership. After being re-appointed to her ministerial role following the 2021 elections, she resigned from the Knesset under the Norwegian Law and was replaced by Alon Tal. She was re-elected to the Knesset in the 2022 elections.

Tamano-Shata spoke at a protest that was held following the 2026 killing of Yimanu Zelka, saying that the attack “shows that something is breaking down in our society.”

=== Committee for the Status of Women and Gender Equality ===
In January 2023, she became the chair of the Committee on the Status of Women and Gender Equality. During her tenure, she played a central role in hearing testimony from the survivors of the 7 October massacre.

In June 2025, a hearing was led by Tamano-Shata after an investigative report was released by journalist Noam Barkan. Barkan was able to identify several women claiming similar ritual abuse and some rabbis' names were mentioned repeatedly as possible abusers. One of the high-profile women claiming ritual sexual abuse was Shoshana Strook, the daughter of Orit Strook, an Israeli cabinet minister. Strook attended Knesset with other alleged victims, but she was unable to participate due to a gag order.

On 27 July 2025, the hearings about ritual sexual abuse continued and several women attended claiming that "doctors, educators, police officers, and both former and current Knesset members" took part. Tamano-Shata advocated that Israeli Police's Lahav 105 wasn't a sufficient agency to investigate these crimes. After her calls for action, the Police added a unit within the Lahav 433 National Crime Unit – which specializes in sexual offenses involving minors and digital exploitation.

Her tenure ended on 28 October 2025.

== See also ==
- Ethiopian Jews in Israel
