= Opinion polling for the 2022 Israeli legislative election =

In the run up to the 2022 Israeli legislative election, various organisations carried out opinion polling to gauge voting intention in Israel during the term of the 24th Knesset. This article lists the results of such polls.

The date range for these opinion polls is from the 2021 Israeli legislative election, held on 23 March, until election day, 1 November 2022. Due to the political deadlock that resulted after the previous election and the possibility of a fifth consecutive snap election, polling for the next election started two weeks after the previous election. The election was held on 1 November 2022. In keeping with the election silence tradition, no polls may be published from the end of the Friday before the election until the polling stations close on election day at 22:00.

Polls are listed in reverse chronological order, showing the most recent first and using the dates when the survey fieldwork was done, as opposed to the date of publication. Where the fieldwork dates are unknown, the date of publication is given instead. The highest figure in each polling survey is displayed with its background shaded in the leading party's colour. If a tie ensues, this is applied to the highest figures. When a poll has no information on a certain party, that party is instead marked by a dash (–).

== Seat projections ==
This section displays voting intention estimates referring to the next Knesset election. The figures listed are Knesset seat counts rather than percentages, unless otherwise stated.

This graph shows the polling trends from the 2021 Israeli legislative election until the next election day using a 4-poll moving average. Scenario polls are not included here. For parties not crossing the electoral threshold (currently 3.25%) in any given poll, the number of seats is calculated as a percentage of the 120 total seats.

Local regression of polls conducted

Poll results are listed in the table below. Parties that fall below the electoral threshold of 3.25% are denoted by the percentage of votes that they received (N%), rather than the number of seats they would have gotten. 61 seats are required for a majority in the Knesset.

Legend

- Gov.
  - — Sum of the 36th government parties: Yesh Atid, Blue & White and New Hope (now running jointly as National Unity), Yamina (now running jointly with The Jewish Home under the Jewish Home name), Labor, Yisrael Beiteinu, Meretz and Ra'am. The coalition parties are highlighted in blue.
- Opp.
  - – Sum of non-government parties that were regarded to be generally-aligned with former prime minister Benyamin Netanyahu (often referred to by the media as the "Netanhu bloc"): Likud; Shas; UTJ; RZP and OY;
- Color key:
  - Exit poll

Date	Polling firm	Publisher	Likud	Yesh Atid	National Unity	Shas	Jewish Home	Labor	UTJ	Yisrael Beiteinu	RZP- OY	Hadash –Ta'al	Meretz	Ra'am	Balad	Others	Gov.	Opp.
01 Nov 22	Election Results		32	24	12	11	(1.19%)	4	7	6	14	5	(3.16%)	5	(2.90%)	(1.53%)	51	64
01 Nov 22	Kantar	Kan 11	30	22	13	10	(1.4%)	5	7	5	15	4	4	5	(3.1%)	0	54	62
01 Nov 22	Midgam	Channel 12	30	24	11	10	0	6	7	4	14	4	5	5	0	0	55	62
01 Nov 22	Camil Fuchs	Channel 13	31	24	12	10	0	5	7	4	14	4	4	5	(2.75%)	0	54	62
01 Nov 22	Direct Polls	Channel 14	31	23	11	10	0	6	8	6	12	4	5	4	0	0	55	61
28 Oct 22	Election silence starting end of Friday before election day																	
28 Oct 22	Camil Fuchs	Channel 13	30	27	10	8	(2.0%)	6	7	5	15	4	4	4	(2.75%)	0.6% Tzeirim Boarim at 0.4% New Economic at 0.2%	56	60
28 Oct 22	Midgam	HaHadashot 12	31	25	11	8	(1.5%)	5	7	6	14	4	5	4	(1.6%)	3.1% New Economic at 0.9% Ale Yarok at 0.6% Tzeirim Boarim at 0.6% Economic Freedom at 0.6% FDI at 0.4%	56	60
27 Oct 22	Smith	Galei Israel	31	25	11	9	(2.0%)	5	7	6	14	4	4	4	(2.1%)	2.4% Economic Freedom at 1.1% New Economic at 0.9% Tzeirim Boarim at 0.4%	55	61
27 Oct 22	Direct Polls	Channel 14	34	23	13	9	(1.9%)	4	7	6	12	4	4	4	(2.1%)	1.7% Economic Freedom at 0.6% New Economic at 0.5% Tzeirim Boarim at 0.5% FDI at 0.1%	54	62
26-27 Oct 22	Kantar	Kan 11	31	24	11	8	(2.0%)	6	7	6	14	4	5	4	(2.2%)	4.2% New Economic at 1.4% Tzeirim Boarim at 1.3% Economic Freedom at 0.9% FDI at 0.5% Ale Yarok at 0.1% Tzomet at 0.0%	56	60
26-27 Oct 22	Panels Politics	Maariv	31	25	12	9	(2.1%)	4	6	6	14	4	5	4	(1.8%)	2.2% New Economic at 1.2% Economic Freedom at 0.7% Tzeirim Boarim at 0.3%	56	60
23-26 Oct 22	Maagar Mochot	Israel Hayom	30	25	11	9	(1.2%)	6	7	5	15	4	4	4	(1.0%)	–	55	61
25 Oct 22	Smith	Galei Israel	32	25	12	9	(1.8%)	5	7	5	13	4	4	4	(1.7-2.1%)	2.4% New Economic at 1.5% Economic Freedom at 0.7% Tzeirim Boarim at 0.2%	55	61
25 Oct 22	Midgam	Galei Tzahal	31	25	13	8	(1.8%)	5	7	6	12	4	5	4	(1.4%)	1.3% New Economic at 1.3%	57	59
25 Oct 22	Camil Fuchs	Channel 13	31	27	11	8	(2.2%)	4	7	6	14	4	4	4	(2.3%)	2.7% New Economic at 1.4% Tzeirim Boarim at 1.3%	56	60
24–25 Oct 22	Panels Politics	Mako/Knesset Channel	31	24	12	8	(2.1%)	5	7	6	14	4	5	4	(1.8%)	1.0% New Economic at 1.0%	56	60
24 Oct 22	Direct Polls	Channel 14	34	23	12	9	(1.9%)	4	7	6	12	4	5	4	(2.0%)	0.8% Economic Freedom at 0.4% New Economic at 0.2% Tzeirim Boarim at 0.2%	54	62
24 Oct 22	Midgam	HaHadashot 12	32	24	13	8	(1.8%)	5	7	5	13	4	5	4	(2.0%)	3.1% FDI at 1.4% Tzeirim Boarim at 0.6% Economic Freedom at 0.4% New Economic at 0.4% Ale Yarok at 0.2% Tzomet at 0.1%	56	60
23 Oct 22	Panels Politics	Maariv	32	23	12	8	(1.6%)	5	7	6	14	4	5	4	(1.7%)	2.7% New Economic at 0.7% Economic Freedom at 0.6% New Independents at 0.2% Tzeirim Boarim at 0.1% Tzomet at 0.1%	55	61
23 Oct 22	Kantar	Kan 11	31	24	12	9	(1.6%)	5	7	6	13	4	5	4	(1.8%)	4.5% New Economic at 1.5% Tzeirim Boarim at 1.2% FDI at 0.7% Economic Freedom at 0.7% Ale Yarok at 0.2% Tzomet at 0.2%	56	60
20 Oct 22	Direct Polls	Channel 14	34	23	13	9	(1.9%)	4	7	6	12	4	4	4	(2.1%)	1.6% Tzeirim Boarim at 0.5% New Economic at 0.7% Economic Freedom at 0.4%	54	62
20 Oct 22	Camil Fuchs	Channel 13	32	26	11	8	(1.5%)	5	7	5	13	4	5	4	(2.5%)	2.4% New Economic at 0.9% Tzeirim Boarim at 1.3% Economic Freedom at 1.0% FDI at 0.5%	56	60
19-20 Oct 22	Panels Politics	Maariv	31	23	12	8	(1.8%)	5	7	7	14	4	5	4	(1.4%)	2.5% Economic Freedom at 1.4% New Economic at 1.1%	56	60
19 Oct 22	Midgam	Keshet	31	24	11	8	(1.9%)	6	7	6	14	4	5	4	(1.3%)	1.6% Tzeirim Boarim at 0.5% Economic Freedom at 0.3% New Economic at 0.3% 30/40 at 0.2% FDI at 0.0% Ale Yarok at 0.0% others at 0.3%	56	60
18–19 Oct 22	Panels Politics	Mako/Knesset Channel	32	24	11	8	(1.9%)	5	7	7	13	4	5	4	(1.4%)	2.9% New Economic at 1.5% Economic Freedom at 0.9% FDI at 0.3% Tzeirim Boarim at 0.2%	56	60
18 Oct 22	Midgam	HaHadashot 12	30	25	12	8	(1.7%)	5	7	6	14	4	5	4	(1.2%)	2.2% New Economic at 1.2% Economic Freedom at 0.5% FDI at 0.4% Tzeirim Boarim at 0.1% Ale Yarok at 0.0% 30/40 at 0.0%	57	59
18 Oct 22	Kantar	Kan 11	31	25	11	8	(1.9%)	5	7	7	14	4	4	4	(2.0%)	1.8% New Economic at 1.8%	56	60
13 Oct 22	Direct Polls	Channel 14	34	23	12	9	(2.1%)	4	7	7	12	4	4	4	(1.8%)	1.4% Tzeirim Boarim at 0.2% New Economic at 0.7% Economic Freedom at 0.5%	54	62
13 Oct 22	Camil Fuchs	Channel 13	32	26	12	8	(1.7%)	6	7	5	12	4	4	4	(1.9%)	3.4% New Economic at 1.4% Tzeirim Boarim at 1.3% Economic Freedom at 0.4% FDI at 0.3%	57	59
12–13 Oct 22	Panels Politics	Maariv	32	24	12	8	(2.7%)	5	7	6	13	4	5	4	(1.1%)	2.3% New Economic at 1.2% Economic Freedom at 0.7% FDI at 0.2% Tzeirim Boarim at 0.2%	56	60
11–12 Oct 22	Panels Politics	Mako/Knesset Channel	32	25	12	8	(2.4%)	4	7	6	13	4	5	4	(0.7%)	1.8% Economic Freedom at 0.7% New Economic at 0.7% Ale Yarok at 0.2% Tzeirim Boarim at 0.2%	56	60
11 Oct 22	Panels Politics	103fm	32	25	11	8	(2.6%)	5	7	6	13	4	5	4	(1.2%)	2.7% Economic Freedom at 1.6% New Economic at 0.5% Tzeirim Boarim at 0.4% Ale Yarok at 0.2%	57	59
11 Oct 22	Midgam	HaHadashot 12	31	24	12	8	(2.0%)	6	7	6	13	4	5	4	(1.6%)	4.1% New Economic at 1.6% Tzeirim Boarim at 1.2% Economic Freedom at 1.0% Ale Yarok at 0.3% FDI at 0.0% Tzomet at 0.0%	57	59
11 Oct 22	Kantar	Kan 11	32	24	12	8	(1.6%)	5	7	6	13	4	5	4	(1.4%)	2.9% New Economic at 1.4% Tzomet at 0.5% Tzeirim Boarim at 0.5% FDI at 0.2% Ale Yarok at 0.2% Economic Freedom at 0.1%	56	60
6 Oct 22	Panels Politics	Maariv	32	23	12	8	(2.4%)	5	7	6	14	4	5	4	(1.2%)	1.8% Economic Freedom at 0.9% New Economic at 0.6% Tzeirim Boarim at 0.3%	55	61
6 Oct 22	Direct Polls	Channel 14	35	23	11	9	(2.2%)	5	7	6	11	4	5	4	(1.6%)	1.8% Tzeirim Boarim at 1.0% New Economic at 0.5% Economic Freedom at 0.3%	54	62
3–4 Oct 22	Panels Politics	Mako/Knesset Channel	32	24	11	8	(2.3%)	6	7	6	13	4	5	4	(1.3%)	1.7% Economic Freedom at 0.7% New Economic at 0.4% Tzeirim Boarim at 0.4% FDI at 0.2% Ale Yarok at 0.0%	56	60
2–3 Oct 22	Maagar Mochot	Israel Hayom	32	24	11	8	(2.0%)	6	7	5	13	4	6	4	(0.6%)	1.6% New Economic at 0.9% Economic Freedom at 0.7% Tzeirim Boarim at 0.0% FDI at 0.0%	56	60
2 Oct 22	Midgam	Galei Tzahal	32	24	12	8	(2.5%)	6	7	6	12	4	5	4	(1.9%)	–	57	59
2 Oct 22	Camil Fuchs	Channel 13	31	25	12	8	(2.0%)	5	7	5	14	4	5	4	(2.0%)	3.5% Tzeirim Boarim at 1.1% Economic Freedom at 1.0% New Economic at 0.9% 30/40 at 0.4% FDI at 0.1%	56	60
29 Sep–1 Oct 22	Kantar	Kan 11	32	25	12	8	(2.2%)	5	7	6	12	4	5	4	(1.6%)	4.4% Economic Freedom at 1.4% New Economic at 1.4% Tzeirim Boarim at 0.8% Tzomet at 0.6% FDI at 0.2% Ale Yarok at 0.0%	57	59
29 Sep 22	Direct Polls	Channel 14	35	23	13	9	(2.4%)	4	7	6	11	4	4	4	(1.5%)	–	54	62
28–29 Sep 22	Panels Politics	Maariv	31	24	13	8	(1.9%)	5	7	6	13	4	5	4	(1.6%)	2.4% Economic Freedom at 1.0%% New Economic at 1.0% Tzeirim Boarim at 0.4%	57	59
28–29 Sep 22	Panels Politics	Mako/Knesset Channel	32	24	12	8	(1.8%)	5	7	6	13	4	5	4	(1.6%)	2.8% New Economic at 1.5% Economic Freedom at 1.0%% Tzeirim Boarim at 0.3%	56	60
28 Sep 22	Midgam	HaHadashot 12	32	24	13	8	(1.6%)	5	7	6	12	4	5	4	(1.1%)	3.5% Economic Freedom at 1.2% Tzeirim Boarim at 1.1% New Economic at 0.9% Ale Yarok at 0.3% FDI at 0.0% Tzomet at 0.0%	57	59
22 Sep 22	Direct Polls	Channel 14	34	23	13	9	(2.3%)	4	7	6	12	4	4	4	(1.4%)	–	54	62
22 Sep 22	Camil Fuchs	Channel 13	32	25	11	8	(1.9%)	5	7	5	14	4	5	4	(2.1%)	2.7% Tzeirim Boarim at 1.3% New Economic at 0.9% Economic Freedom at 0.4% FDI at 0.1%	55	61
22 Sep 22	Midgam	HaHadashot 12	34	23	12	8	(1.8%)	5	7	6	11	4	5	5	(2.4%)	3.4% New Economic at 1.8% Economic Freedom at 0.6% Tzeirim Boarim at 0.6% FDI at 0.4%	56	60
21–22 Sep 22	Panels Politics	Maariv	33	24	12	8	(2.0%)	6	7	5	12	4	5	4	(1.2%)	1.2% Tzeirim Boarim at 0.7% New Economic at 0.5% Economic Freedom at 0.0% Ale Yarok at 0.0%	56	60
20–21 Sep 22	Panels Politics	Mako/Knesset Channel	33	24	12	8	(1.9%)	5	7	6	12	4	5	4	(1.1%)	1.5% New Economic at 0.9% Economic Freedom at 0.3% Tzeirim Boarim at 0.3%	56	60
18 Sep 22	Direct Polls	Channel 14	34	22	13	9	(2.2%)	5	7	6	12	4	4	4	(1.6%)	1.7% New Economic at 1.0% Tzeirim Boarim at 0.4% FDI at 0.3%	54	60
17 Sep 22	Kantar	Kan 11	33	24	12	8	(1.9%)	6	7	5	12	4	5	4	(1.5%)	3.6% Tzeirim Boarim at 1.9% New Economic at 0.7% FDI at 0.6% Economic Freedom at 0.4%	56	60
16 Sep 22	Camil Fuchs	Channel 13	32	24	12	8	(2.0%)	5	7	6	13	4	5	4	(1.2%)	3.4% Tzeirim Boarim at 1.9% New Economic at 1.1% FDI at 0.4% 30/40 at 0.0%	56	60
16 Sep 22	Midgam	HaHadashot 12	33	23	12	8	(1.9%)	6	7	6	12	4	5	4	(0.9%)	1.9% Tzeirim Boarim at 1.1% FDI at 0.4% New Economic at 0.3% Ale Yarok at 0.1%	56	60
15 Sep 22	Deadline for party lists to be submitted																	
15 Sep 22	Joint List splits into Hadash–Ta'al and Balad																	

Date	Polling firm	Publisher	Likud	Yesh Atid	National Unity	Shas	JH/ Yamina	Labor	UTJ	Yisrael Beiteinu	RZP- OY	Joint List	Meretz	Ra'am	Others	Gov.	Opp.
15 Sep 22	Panels Politics	Maariv	31	25	12	8	(2.2%)	5	7	6	11	6	5	4	2.4% Tzeirim Boarim at 1.5% Economic Freedom at 0.5% New Economic at 0.2% Ale Yarok at 0.2% FDI at 0.0%	57	57
15 Sep 22	Direct Polls	Channel 14	34	22	12	9	(2.4%)	5	7	6	11	5	5	4	2.49% Tzeirim Boarim at 1.4% New Economic at 0.62; FDI at 0.47%	54	59
14 Sep 22	Camil Fuchs	Channel 13	31	24	12	8	(1.9%)	5	7	6	13	5	5	4	2.7% New Economic at 1.1% Tzeirim Boarim at 1.0% FDI at 0.6%	56	59
14 Sep 22	Noam rejoins Religious Zionist Party-Otzma Yehudit																
13 Sep 22	Zionist Spirit drops out																
13 Sep 22	Kantar	Kan 11	32	24	12	9	(1.3%)	5	7	5	12	5	5	4	4.2% Tzeirim Boarim at 1.7% New Economic at 1.2% Economic Freedom at 0.7% Derekh Eretz at 0.6% FDI at 0.0%	55	60
13 Sep 22	Yamina officially announces that it will run as part of The Jewish Home																
12–13 Sep 22	Panels Politics	Mako/Knesset Channel	32	26	12	8	(1.4%)	5	6	5	11	6	5	4	3.7% Tzeirim Boarim at 1.4% New Economic at 0.7% Economic Freedom at 0.9% Derekh Eretz at 0.7%	57	57
11–12 Sep 22	Maagar Mochot	Israel Hayom	33	23	12	7	(0.9%)	7	7	4	12	6	5	4	1.7% New Economic at 0.9% Tzeirim Boarim at 0.8%	55	59
11 Sep 22	Direct Polls	Channel 14	34	23	12	9	(2.4%)	4	7	5	11	6	5	4	1.25% FDI at 0.6% New Economic at 0.45% Zionist Spirit at 0.2%	53	61
11 Sep 22	Yamina and Derekh Eretz split, with Ayelet Shaked considering a partnership with Jewish Home and Yoaz Hendel keeping the Zionist Spirit name																

Date	Polling firm	Publisher	Likud	Yesh Atid	National Unity	Shas	Zionist Spirit	Labor	UTJ	Yisrael Beiteinu	RZP- OY	Joint List	Meretz	Ra'am	Others	Gov.	Opp.
8 Sep 22	Midgam	HaHadashot 12	32	23	12	9	(1.1%)	5	7	5	11	5	6	5	1.3% New Economic at 0.7% Tzeirim Boarim at 0.4% Jewish Home at 0.2% Ale Yarok at 0.0% FDI at 0.0%	56	59
8 Sep 22	Panels Politics	Maariv	31	25	12	8	(1.9%)	4	7	5	13	6	5	4	2.7% Tzeirim Boarim at 1.1% Economic Freedom at 0.8% New Economic at 0.6% Jewish Home at 0.2% Ale Yarok at 0.0% FDI at 0.0%	55	59
4 Sep 22	MK Abir Kara, formerly of Yamina, forms a new political party called Economic Freedom																
4 Sep 22	Direct Polls	Channel 14	33	22	12	10	(1.99%)	5	7	6	10	6	5	4	1.76% Tzeirim Boarim at 1.09% New Economic at 0.47% FDI at 0.2%	54	60
2 Sep 22	Panels Politics	Maariv	31	24	13	8	(1.9%)	5	6	5	13	6	5	4	2.2% New Economic at 1.4% Tzeirim Boarim at 0.6% FDI at 0.2% Jewish Home at 0.0% Ale Yarok at 0.0%	56	58
1 Sep 22	Camil Fuchs	Channel 13	32	24	13	8	(2.0%)	5	7	6	12	5	4	4	1.6% New Economic at 1.3% FDI at 0.3%	56	58
31 Aug 22	Midgam	HaHadashot 12	33	24	12	8	(2.1%)	5	7	6	11	5	5	4	2.6% Tzeirim Boarim at 1.5% New Economic at 1.1% FDI at 0.0% Jewish Home at 0.0% Ale Yarok at 0.0%	56	59
28 Aug 22	Panels Politics	103fm	32	23	13	8	(3%)	5	7	5	12	6	5	4	1.7% New Economic at 0.7% FDI at 0.6% Jewish Home at 0.2% Ale Yarok at 0.2%	55	59
28 Aug 22	Noam announces it will run independently																
26 Aug 22	The Religious Zionist Party and Otzma Yehudit agree on a joint list																

Date	Polling firm	Publisher	Likud	Yesh Atid	National Unity	Shas	Zionist Spirit	Labor	UTJ	Yisrael Beiteinu	Religious Zionist	Otzma Yehudit	Joint List	Meretz	Ra'am	Others	Gov.	Opp.
25 Aug 22	Panels Politics	Maariv	31	23	13	8	(2.8%)	6	7	5	4	8	6	5	4	2.0% New Economic at 1.4% FDI at 0.4% Ale Yarok at 0.2% Jewish Home at 0.0%	56	60
24 Aug 22	Direct Polls	Channel 14	35	22	12	8	(2.1%)	5	7	6	10		6	4	4	1.06% FDI at 1.06%	53	61
24 Aug 22	Camil Fuchs	Channel 13	30	23	12	8	(2.5%)	5	7	6	7	9	5	4	4	0.9% New Economic at 0.6% FDI at 0.3%	54	61
24 Aug 22	Midgam	HaHadashot 12	34	23	13	8	(1.8%)	5	7	5	(2.8%)	9	5	6	5	2.1% New Economic at 1.3% FDI at 0.8% Ale Yarok at 0.0% Jewish Home at 0.0%	57	58
24 Aug 22	Kantar	Kan 11	33	22	14	8	(2.2%)	5	7	5	4	8	5	5	4	2.4% New Economic at 1.5% FDI at 0.9%	55	60
23 Aug 22	Zehava Gal-On defeats Yair Golan in the Meretz leadership primary																	
18 Aug 22	Panels Politics	Maariv	32	25	12	8	(2.6%)	5	7	5	5	7	6	4	4	1.0% New Economic at 0.6% FDI at 0.2% Ale Yarok at 0.2% Jewish Home at 0.0%	55	59
15 Aug 22	Otzma Yehudit announces an independent run																	

Date	Polling firm	Publisher	Likud	Yesh Atid	NUP/B&W– NH	Shas	Zionist Spirit/Yamina	Labor	UTJ	Yisrael Beiteinu	Religious Zionist	Joint List	Meretz	Ra'am	Others	Gov.	Opp.
14 Aug 22	Direct Polls	Channel 14	34	22	13	9	(1.8%)	5	7	5	11	5	4	5	–	54	61
14 Aug 22	Camil Fuchs	Channel 13	34	23	12	8	(2.1%)	6	7	4	11	6	4	5	0.7% New Economic at 0.7% FDI at 0.0%	54	60
14 Aug 22	Midgam	HaHadashot 12	34	23	14	8	(1.2%)	5	7	5	10	6	4	4	1.3% New Economic at 0.8% FDI at 0.2% Ale Yarok at 0.2% Jewish Home at 0.1%	54	60
14 Aug 22	Kantar	Kan 11	35	22	14	8	(1.6%)	5	7	5	9	6	4	5	1.4% New Economic at 1.2% FDI at 0.2%	55	59
14 Aug 22	Former IDF Chief of Staff Gadi Eizenkot and former Yamina MK Matan Kahana join Blue and White–New Hope to form the National Unity Party																
11 Aug 22	Panels Politics	Maariv	33	25	10	9	4	7	7	5	10	6	(2.9%)	4	1.8% New Economic at 1.0% FDI at 0.3% Jewish Home at 0.3% Ale Yarok at 0.2%	55	59
8 Aug 22	Camil Fuchs	Channel 13	34	22	11	7	4	5	7	5	11	6	4	4	1.7% New Economic at 1.2% FDI at 0.5%	55	59
8 Aug 22	Midgam	HaHadashot 12	34	24	12	8	(2.1%)	5	7	5	10	6	4	5	1.4% New Economic at 0.8% FDI at 0.2% Jewish Home at 0.2% Ale Yarok at 0.2%	55	59
8 Aug 22	Kantar	Kan 11	33	23	12	8	(2.1%)	5	7	6	11	6	5	4	2.0% New Economic at 1.1% Jewish Home at 0.5% FDI at 0.2% Ale Yarok at 0.2%	55	59
4 Aug 22	Panels Politics	Maariv	34	23	11	8	4	5	7	5	9	6	4	4	2.7% FDI at 1.3% New Economic at 1.1% Ale Yarok at 0.2% Jewish Home at 0.1%	56	58
4 Aug 22	Direct Polls	Channel 14	34	23	12	9	(2.2%)	5	7	5	11	5	4	5	–	54	61
4 Aug 22	Camil Fuchs	Channel 13	35	21	12	8	(2.8%)	6	7	5	12	6	4	4	1.5% FDI at 1.5%	52	62
2 Aug 22	Former Yisrael Beiteinu MK Eli Avidar forms a new political party called Free Democratic Israel																
31 Jul 22	Maagar Mohot	Jerusalem Net	34	22	12	9	–	6	7	5	11	6	4	4	–	53	61
28 Jul 22	Direct Polls	Channel 14	34	21	13	9	(2.4%)	5	7	6	11	5	4	5	–	54	61
28 Jul 22	Panels Politics	Maariv	35	23	11	8	4	4	6	5	10	6	4	4	0.9% New Economic at 0.9% Jewish Home at 0.0%	55	59
28 Jul 22	Midgam	HaHadashot 12	33	23	11	8	4	5	7	5	9	6	5	4	1.5% New Economic at 1.0% Jewish Home at 0.5%	57	57
27 Jul 22	Yamina and Derekh Eretz announce a joint alliance called Zionist Spirit																
26 Jul 22	Camil Fuchs	Channel 13	35	24	13	8	–	4	6	5	11	6	4	4	–	54	60
24 Jul 22	Kantar	Kan 11	35	22	12	8	(1.6%)	6	7	5	10	6	5	4	–	54	60
20–21 Jul 22	Panels Politics	Maariv	35	24	12	8	(1.9%)	5	6	6	10	6	4	4	0.9% Jewish Home at 0.9%	55	59
18 Jul 22	Merav Michaeli defeats Eran Hermoni in the Labor leadership primary																
15 Jul 22	Panels Politics	Maariv	36	24	13	8	(2.2%)	6	7	6	10	6	(2.5%)	4	–	53	61
12 Jul 22	Direct Polls	Channel 14	36	20	14	9	(1.9%)	5	7	6	9	5	4	5	–	54	61
11 Jul 22	Midgam	HaHadashot 12	34	23	13	8	(1.9%)	5	7	6	10	6	4	4	–	55	59
11 Jul 22	Kantar	Kan 11	34	23	14	8	(1.9%)	5	7	5	10	6	4	4	–	55	59
10 Jul 22	Blue and White and New Hope announce a joint run, Derekh Eretz left out of the alliance.																

Date	Polling firm	Publisher	Likud	Yesh Atid	Shas	Blue & White	Yamina	Labor	UTJ	Yisrael Beiteinu	Religious Zionist	Joint List	New Hope	Meretz	Ra'am	Gov.	Opp.
6–7 Jul 22	Panels Politics	Maariv	36	23	8	9	(2.6%)	6	7	6	10	6	5	(2.1%)	4	53	61
3 Jul 22	Kantar	Kan 11	34	21	8	8	4	5	7	5	10	6	4	4	4	55	59
1 Jul 22	Lapid becomes caretaker prime minister																
30 Jun 22	The 24th Knesset is dissolved																
29–30 Jun 22	Panels Politics	Maariv	34	22	8	9	4	6	7	5	10	6	5	(2.2%)	4	55	59
29 Jun 22	Midgam	HaHadashot 12	34	20	8	9	5	5	7	5	9	6	4	4	4	56	58
29 Jun 22	PM Bennett announces he will not seek re-election. Interior Minister Shaked replaces him as Yamina leader																
22–23 Jun 22	Panels Politics	Maariv	34	21	7	8	4	7	7	5	9	6	4	4	4	57	57
21 Jun 22	Direct Polls	Channel 14	36	20	8	7	4	5	7	6	9	6	4	4	4	54	60
21 Jun 22	Camil Fuchs	Channel 13	35	22	8	7	4	5	7	5	9	6	4	4	4	55	59
21 Jun 22	Midgam	HaHadashot 12	35	20	8	9	4	6	7	5	9	5	4	4	4	56	59
21 Jun 22	Kantar	Kan 11	36	21	8	9	5	6	7	5	9	6	4	(2.4%)	4	54	60
20 Jun 22	Panels Politics	103fm	36	20	7	8	7	7	6	5	10	6	4	(2.7%)	4	55	59
20 Jun 22	PM Bennett and Alternate PM Lapid agree to dissolve the Knesset																
13 Jun 22	MK Nir Orbach of Yamina leaves the coalition																
13 Jun 22	Midgam	HaHadashot 12	36	20	8	10	5	6	7	5	9	5	(2.9%)	4	5	55	
10 Jun 22	Camil Fuchs	Channel 13	36	20	8	8	6	6	7	5	9	7	4	4	–	53	
8 Jun 22	Panels Politics	Maariv	34	21	8	8	5	6	7	5	11	7	4	(2.5%)	4	53	
7 Jun 22	Kantar	Kan 11	35	20	8	8	6	7	7	5	10	6	(2.8%)	4	4	54	
24–25 May 22	Panels Politics	The Jerusalem Post	35	20	8	8	6	7	7	5	9	7	4	(2.6%)	4	54	
22 May 22	MK Ghaida Rinawie Zoabi of Meretz returns to the coalition																
21 May 22	Panels Politics	103fm	36	18	8	8	6	8	7	5	9	7	4	(2.5%)	4	53	
19 May 22	MK Ghaida Rinawie Zoabi of Meretz leaves the coalition																
9 May 22	Camil Fuchs	Channel 13	36	18	7	7	8	6	7	5	9	8	4	5	–	53	
3 May 22	Smith	Galei Israel	36	20	8	7	5	7	7	6	8	6	–	5	5	55	
25 Apr 22	MK Amichai Chikli ousted from Yamina																
6–7 Apr 22	Maagar Mohot	Israel Hayom	35	19	9	8	5	8	8	6	8	6	–	4	4	54	
7 Apr 22	Panels Politics	Maariv	37	18	7	7	5	6	7	5	9	6	4	5	4	54	
6 Apr 22	Direct Polls	Channel 14	35	20	10	8	(2.9%)	7	8	6	9	7	(2.5%)	5	5	51	
6 Apr 22	Camil Fuchs	Channel 13	38	17	7	9	7	6	7	6	8	6	–	5	4	54	
6 Apr 22	Midgam	HaHadashot 12	35	17	9	8	5	7	7	5	7	6	4	5	5	56	
6 Apr 22	Kantar	Kan 11	35	19	8	8	6	5	7	4	8	6	5	5	4	56	
6 Apr 22	MK Idit Silman of Yamina leaves the coalition																
28 Mar 22	Midgam	HaHadashot 12	34	18	9	8	6	6	7	5	8	6	4	4	5	56	
22 Mar 22	Direct Polls	Channel 14	34	18	9	8	4	7	7	7	8	7	(2.8%)	5	4	53	
21 Mar 22	Maagar Mohot	Israel Hayom	34	17	8	10	6	8	8	5	9	6	–	5	4	55	
15 Mar 22	Midgam	HaHadashot 12	34	17	9	7	7	7	7	6	7	6	4	4	5	57	
13 Feb 22	Direct Polls	–	36	17	9	9	4	7	7	6	8	7	(2.9%)	5	5	53	
18 Jan 22	Maagar Mohot	Israel Hayom	34	18	9	9	5	8	7	6	8	7	–	4	5	55	
16 Jan 22	Midgam	HaHadashot 12	33	18	9	9	5	7	7	6	7	6	4	4	5	58	
10 Jan 22	Maagar Mohot	Srugim	33	18	9	11	6	8	7	6	8	5	(2%)	5	4	58	
6 Jan 22	Direct Polls	Channel 14	35	19	9	8	4	7	7	7	7	7	(2.9%)	4	6	55	
6 Jan 22	Smith	Galei Israel	33	20	8	8	6	7	7	7	8	6	–	5	5	58	
2021
21 Dec 21	Camil Fuchs	Channel 13	33	19	8	8	9	6	7	5	7	5	4	4	5	60	
15–16 Dec 21	Panels Politics	103fm	33	19	8	9	6	7	7	6	8	7	(2.9%)	5	5	57	
5 Dec 21	Midgam	HaHadashot 12	34	19	9	9	6	7	7	6	7	6	(2.4%)	5	5	57	
2 Dec 21	Smith	Galei Israel	34	21	9	7	5	7	7	7	7	7	–	4	5	56	
28 Nov 21	Direct Polls	Channel 14	35	19	9	8	4	7	7	7	7	7	(2.39%)	4	6	55	
22 Nov 21	Maagar Mohot	Channel 14	33	18	8	9	6	8	8	6	7	7	(1.3%)	5	5	57	
1 Nov 21	Smith	Galei Israel	34	20	8	8	6	7	7	6	7	7	(2.9%)	6	5	58	
1 Nov 21	Camil Fuchs	Channel 13	36	20	7	7	6	10	7	4	6	8	(2.6%)	5	4	56	
31 Oct 21	Direct Polls	–	35	20	9	7	(2.9%)	7	8	7	7	7	4	4	5	54	
12 Oct 21	Midgam	HaHadashot 12	34	18	9	8	7	7	7	5	6	6	4	5	4	58	
6 Oct 21	Smith	Galei Israel	33	21	8	8	5	7	7	6	7	7	–	6	5	58	
4 Oct 21	Camil Fuchs	Channel 13	34	22	6	7	7	6	7	5	7	7	4	4	4	59	
3 Oct 21	Direct Polls	–	35	19	9	8	4	8	7	6	7	8	(1.8%)	4	5	54	
12 Sep 21	Smith	–	33	22	8	8	5	7	7	7	8	6	(1.8%)	5	5	58	
1 Sep 21	Smith	Galei Israel	33	18	9	10	6	6	7	7	7	6	–	6	5	58	
20 Aug 21	Midgam	HaHadashot 12	32	20	9	8	6	8	7	6	6	6	4	4	4	60	
18 Aug 21	Maagar Mohot	Channel 14	32	18	8	11	7	7	7	7	7	5	(2.0%)	6	5	61	
11–12 Aug 21	Maagar Mohot	Israel Hayom	32	18	8	10	8	6	7	7	7	6	–	6	5	60	
14–15 Jul 21	Maagar Mohot	Israel Hayom	29	21	9	7	9	7	7	6	7	6	–	6	6	62	
12 Jul 21	Midgam	HaHadashot 12	30	19	9	8	8	8	7	7	5	6	5	4	4	63	
22 Jun 21	Maagar Mohot	Channel 14	29	22	9	7	6	7	7	6	7	6	4	5	5	62	
13 Jun 21	Camil Fuchs	Channel 13	27	23	7	10	7	7	6	5	8	6	5	4	5	66	
13 Jun 21	Smith	Kikar HaShabbat	31	23	9	7	5	6	7	5	7	6	5	4	5	60	
13 Jun 21	The thirty-sixth government of Israel is sworn in																
10 Jun 21	Maagar Mohot	Channel 14	30	23	9	6	4	7	7	6	9	5	4	6	4	—N/a	
23 May 21	Midgam	HaHadashot 12	30	21	9	10	5	6	7	6	7	5	6	4	4	—N/a	
23 May 21	Camil Fuchs	Channel 13	29	22	7	11	8	7	6	5	8	8	5	4	–	—N/a	
13 May 21	Direct Polls	–	33	19	9	6	4	7	7	7	8	6	5	4	5	—N/a	
4 May 21	Camil Fuchs	Channel 13	28	21	7	8	11	7	7	5	5	6	6	5	4	—N/a	
22 Apr 21	Midgam	HaHadashot 12	30	19	9	7	7	8	7	7	6	6	5	5	4	—N/a	
22 Apr 21	Maagar Mohot	103fm	30	20	8	7	9	7	8	5	6	6	4	5	5	—N/a	
5 Apr 21	Panels Politics	103fm	29	21	9	7	10	7	7	6	5	5	5	5	4	—N/a	
23 Mar 21	Election results		30	17	9	8	7	7	7	7	6	6	6	6	4	61 (Note: Although Yamina is part of the government, Amichai Chikli chose to join the opposition.)	

== Scenario polls ==
Most often, opinion polling about hypothetical scenarios is done in the same survey as for the regular polling. This is why these scenario polls are paired for comparison purposes.

Regular poll
Scenario poll

Benjamin Netanyahu supports The Jewish Home

Date	Polling firm	Publisher	Likud	Yesh Atid	National Unity	Shas	Jewish Home	Labor	UTJ	Yisrael Beiteinu	RZP- OY	Hadash –Ta'al	Meretz	Ra'am	Balad	Gov.
12–13 Oct 22	Panels Politics	Maariv	32	24	12	8	(2.7%)	5	7	6	13	4	5	4	(1.1%)	56
12–13 Oct 22	Panels Politics	Maariv	31	23	11	8	4	5	7	6	12	4	5	4	-	58

Jewish Home drops out

Date	Polling firm	Publisher	Likud	Yesh Atid	National Unity	Shas	Jewish Home	Labor	UTJ	Yisrael Beiteinu	RZP- OY	Hadash –Ta'al	Meretz	Ra'am	Balad	Others	Gov.
3–4 Oct 22	Panels Politics	Mako/Knesset Channel	32	24	11	8	(2.3%)	6	7	6	13	4	5	4	(1.3%)	–	56
3–4 Oct 22	Panels Politics	Mako/Knesset Channel	31	24	12	8	—N/a	6	7	6	13	4	5	4	–	1.0% Economic Freedom at 1.0%	57
29 Sep 22	Direct Polls	Channel 14	35	23	13	9	(2.4%)	4	7	6	11	4	4	4	(1.49%)	–	54
29 Sep 22	Direct Polls	Channel 14	34	23	13	9	—N/a	4	7	6	12	4	4	4	(1.49%)	–	54

Labor and Meretz form an alliance

Date	Polling firm	Publisher	Likud	Yesh Atid	National Unity	Labor- Meretz	Shas	UTJ	Yisrael Beiteinu	RZP- OY	Joint List	Ra'am	Gov.
12 Sep 22	Maagar Mochot	Israel Hayom	33	23	12	12	7	7	4	12	6	4	55
12 Sep 22	Maagar Mochot	Israel Hayom	33	22	11	13	8	7	4	13	5	4	54

Naftali Bennett rejoins Yamina

Date	Polling firm	Publisher	Likud	Yesh Atid	National Unity	Shas	Yamina	Labor	UTJ	Yisrael Beiteinu	RZP- OY	Joint List	Meretz	Ra'am	Gov.
12 Sep 22	Maagar Mochot	Israel Hayom	33	23	12	7	(0.9%)	7	7	4	12	6	5	4	55
12 Sep 22	Maagar Mochot	Israel Hayom	33	22	10	7	5	6	7	4	13	5	4	4	55

Itamar Ben-Gvir leading Religious Zionist Party

Date	Polling firm	Publisher	Likud	Yesh Atid	B&W-NH	Shas	Yamina	Labor	UTJ	Yisrael Beiteinu	Religious Zionist	Joint List	Meretz	Ra'am	Gov.
17 Jul 22	Camil Fuchs	Channel 13	34	22	12	8	(2.9%)	6	7	6	10	6	5 (Note: In case Zehava Gal-On leads Meretz)	4	55
17 Jul 22	Camil Fuchs	Channel 13	32	22	11	8	–	7	7	6	13	6	4	4	54

Yair Golan leading Meretz

Date	Polling firm	Publisher	Likud	Yesh Atid	B&W-NH	Shas	Yamina	Labor	UTJ	Yisrael Beiteinu	Religious Zionist	Joint List	Meretz	Ra'am	Gov.
17 Jul 22	Camil Fuchs	Channel 13	34	22	12	8	(2.9%)	6	7	6	10	6	5	4	55
17 Jul 22	Camil Fuchs	Channel 13	34	22	12	8	–	7	7	6	10	6	4	4	55

Yoaz Hendel joins Yamina

Date	Polling firm	Publisher	Likud	Yesh Atid	B&W-NH	Shas	Yamina	Labor	UTJ	Yisrael Beiteinu	Religious Zionist	Joint List	Meretz	Ra'am	Jewish Home	Gov.
22 Jul 22	Panels Politics	Maariv	35	24	12	8	(1.9%)	5	6	6	10	6	4	4	(0.9%)	55
22 Jul 22	Panels Politics	Maariv	35	24	12	8	(2.6%)	5	6	6	10	6	4	4	(0.6%)	55
15 Jul 22	Panels Politics	Maariv	36	24	13	8	(2.2%)	6	7	6	10	6	(2.5%)	4	–	53
15 Jul 22	Panels Politics	Maariv	36	23	12	8	4	6	7	5	9	6	(2.5%)	4	–	54
11 Jul 22	Midgam	HaHadashot 12	34	23	13	8	(1.9%)	5	7	6	10	6	4	4	–	55
11 Jul 22	Midgam	HaHadashot 12	34	23	13	8	(2.8%)	5	7	6	10	6	4	4	–	55

Gadi Eizenkot joins B&W-NH

Date	Polling firm	Publisher	Likud	Yesh Atid	B&W-NH	Shas	Yamina	Labor	UTJ	Yisrael Beiteinu	Religious Zionist	Joint List	Meretz	Ra'am	Gov.
11 Jul 22	Kantar	Kan 11	34	23	14	8	(1.9%)	5	7	5	10	6	4	4	55
11 Jul 22	Kantar	Kan 11	34	21	17	8	(2.1%)	5	7	5	9	6	4	4	56
11 Jul 22	Midgam	HaHadashot 12	34	23	13	8	(1.9%)	5	7	6	10	6	4	4	55
11 Jul 22	Midgam	HaHadashot 12	34	21	15	8	(1.8%)	5	7	6	10	6	4	4	55

Gadi Eizenkot joins Yesh Atid

Date	Polling firm	Publisher	Likud	Yesh Atid	B&W-NH	Shas	Yamina	Labor	UTJ	Yisrael Beiteinu	Religious Zionist	Joint List	Meretz	Ra'am	Gov.
11 Jul 22	Midgam	HaHadashot 12	34	23	13	8	(1.9%)	5	7	6	10	6	4	4	55
11 Jul 22	Midgam	HaHadashot 12	34	24	13	8	(1.8%)	5	7	5	10	6	4	4	55

Blue and White, New Hope merger

Date	Polling firm	Publisher	Likud	Yesh Atid	Shas	Blue & White	New Hope	Yamina	Labor	UTJ	Yisrael Beiteinu	Religious Zionist	Joint List	Meretz	Ra'am	Gov.
29 Jun 22	Midgam	HaHadashot 12	34	20	8	9	4	5	5	7	5	9	6	4	4	56
29 Jun 22	Midgam	HaHadashot 12	36	21	8	15		(2.7%)	5	7	5	9	6	4	4	54

Amichai Chikli forms a party & Yamina, New Hope merger

Date	Polling firm	Publisher	Likud	Yesh Atid	Shas	Blue & White	Yamina	New Hope	Labor	UTJ	Yisrael Beiteinu	Religious Zionist	Joint List	Meretz	Ra'am	Chikli	Gov.
21 Jun 22	Direct Polls	Channel 14	36	20	8	7	4	4	5	7	6	9	6	4	4	—N/a	54
21 Jun 22	Direct Polls	Channel 14	33	21	8	8	4	(2.8%)	6	7	6	9	6	4	4	4	53
21 Jun 22	Direct Polls	Channel 14	34	21	8	7	6		6	7	5	8	6	4	4	4	53

Yamina drops out

Date	Polling firm	Publisher	Likud	Yesh Atid	Shas	Blue & White	Yamina	Labor	UTJ	Yisrael Beiteinu	Religious Zionist	Joint List	New Hope	Meretz	Ra'am	Gov.
21 Jun 22	Midgam	HaHadashot 12	35	20	8	9	4	6	7	5	9	5	4	4	4	56
21 Jun 22	Midgam	HaHadashot 12	35	22	8	10	—N/a	6	7	6	9	5	4	4	4	56

Yamina, New Hope merger

Date	Polling firm	Publisher	Likud	Yesh Atid	Shas	Blue & White	Yamina	New Hope	Labor	UTJ	Yisrael Beiteinu	Religious Zionist	Joint List	Meretz	Ra'am	Gov.
21 Jun 22	Camil Fuchs	Channel 13	35	22	8	7	4	4	5	7	5	9	6	4	4	55
21 Jun 22	Camil Fuchs	Channel 13	34	22	8	7	13		5	7	5	9	6	4	–	56

Yamina, New Hope, Yisrael Beiteinu merger & Labor, Meretz merger

Date	Polling firm	Publisher	Likud	Yesh Atid	Shas	Blue & White	Yamina	Yisrael Beiteinu	New Hope	Labor	Meretz	UTJ	Religious Zionist	Joint List	Ra'am	Gov.
24–25 May 22	Panels Politics	The Jerusalem Post	35	20	8	8	6	5	4	7	(2.6%)	7	9	7	4	54
24–25 May 22	Panels Politics	The Jerusalem Post	35	20	9	7	12			9		7	9	8	4	52

Yoaz Hendel joins Yamina, Ayelet Shaked joins Likud, Religious Zionist Party & Otzma Yehudit split, Amichai Chikli forms a party

Date	Polling firm	Publisher	Likud	Yesh Atid	Shas	Blue & White	Yamina	Labor	UTJ	Yisrael Beiteinu	Religious Zionist	Otzma Yehudit	Joint List	New Hope	Meretz	Ra'am	Chikli	Gov.
24–25 May 22	Panels Politics	The Jerusalem Post	35	20	8	8	6	7	7	5	9		7	4	(2.6%)	4	—N/a	54
24–25 May 22	Panels Politics	The Jerusalem Post	32	20	8	8	7	7	7	5	5	6	7	4	(2.4%)	4	(2.7%)	55

Otzma Yehudit split from Religious Zionist Party

Date	Polling firm	Publisher	Likud	Yesh Atid	B&W– NH/ National Unity	Shas	Zionist Spirit	Labor	UTJ	Yisrael Beiteinu	RZP	Otzma Yehudit	Joint List	Meretz	Ra'am	Free Dem. Israel	Jewish Home	New Economic	Ale Yarok	Gov.
8 Aug 22	Midgam	HaHadashot 12	34	23	14	8	(1.2%)	5	7	5	10		6	4	4	(0.2%)	(0.1%)	(0.8%)	(0.2%)	54
8 Aug 22	Midgam	HaHadashot 12	31	23	14	8	–	5	7	5	5	8	6	4	4	–	–	–	–	54
28 Jul 22	Midgam	HaHadashot 12	33	23	11	8	4	5	7	5	9		6	5	4	–	(0.5%)	(1%)	–	57
28 Jul 22	Midgam	HaHadashot 12	31	23	11	8	4	5	7	5	4	7	6	5	4	–	–	–	–	57

Date	Polling firm	Publisher	Likud	Yesh Atid	Shas	Blue & White	Yamina	Labor	UTJ	Yisrael Beiteinu	Religious Zionist	Otzma Yehudit	Joint List	New Hope	Meretz	Ra'am	Gov.
21 May 22	Panels Politics	103fm	36	18	8	8	6	8	7	5	9		7	4	(2.5%)	4	53
21 May 22	Panels Politics	103fm	35	19	8	8	6	8	6	5	5	5	7	4	–	4	54

Likud leadership

Date	Polling firm	Publisher	Likud led by Netanyahu					Yesh Atid	Shas	Blue & White	Yamina	Labor	UTJ	Yisrael Beiteinu	Religious Zionist	Joint List	New Hope	Meretz	Ra'am	Gov.
Date	Polling firm	Publisher	Barkat	Katz	Edelstein	Regev	Erdan	Yesh Atid	Shas	Blue & White	Yamina	Labor	UTJ	Yisrael Beiteinu	Religious Zionist	Joint List	New Hope	Meretz	Ra'am	Gov.
18 Jan 22	Maagar Mohot	Israel Hayom	34					18	9	9	5	8	7	6	8	7	–	4	5	55
18 Jan 22	Maagar Mohot	Israel Hayom	29	—N/a	—N/a	—N/a	—N/a	20	11	8	5	8	8	5	11	7	–	4	4	54
18 Jan 22	Maagar Mohot	Israel Hayom	—N/a	15	—N/a	—N/a	—N/a	21	12	9	5	7	9	6	14	8	4	5	5	62
18 Jan 22	Maagar Mohot	Israel Hayom	—N/a	—N/a	16	—N/a	—N/a	21	12	10	5	8	8	6	13	8	4	5	4	63
16 Jan 22	Midgam	HaHadashot 12	33					18	9	9	5	7	7	6	7	6	4	4	5	58
16 Jan 22	Midgam	HaHadashot 12	29	—N/a	—N/a	—N/a	—N/a	17	10	9	5	7	7	7	10	6	4	4	5	58
16 Jan 22	Midgam	HaHadashot 12	—N/a	19	—N/a	—N/a	—N/a	19	11	12	5	7	7	8	12	6	5	4	5	65
16 Jan 22	Midgam	HaHadashot 12	—N/a	—N/a	20	—N/a	—N/a	19	11	11	5	7	7	7	13	6	5	4	5	63
10 Jan 22	Maagar Mohot	Srugim	33					18	9	11	6	8	7	6	8	5	(2%)	5	4	58
10 Jan 22	Maagar Mohot	Srugim	31	—N/a	—N/a	—N/a	—N/a	15	12	8	5	8	7	6	12	6	(1%)	6	4	52
10 Jan 22	Maagar Mohot	Srugim	—N/a	13	—N/a	—N/a	—N/a	16	15	12	7	8	7	6	15	6	4	6	5	64
10 Jan 22	Maagar Mohot	Srugim	—N/a	—N/a	13	—N/a	—N/a	17	14	13	6	8	7	7	14	6	4	6	5	66
10 Jan 22	Maagar Mohot	Srugim	—N/a	—N/a	—N/a	15	—N/a	17	14	12	6	8	7	6	13	6	4	7	5	65
10 Jan 22	Maagar Mohot	Srugim	—N/a	—N/a	—N/a	—N/a	22	16	13	10	4	8	7	6	13	6	4	6	5	59
15–16 Dec 21	Panels Politics	103fm	33					19	8	9	6	7	7	6	8	7	(2.9%)	5	5	57
15–16 Dec 21	Panels Politics	103fm	29	—N/a	—N/a	—N/a	—N/a	19	9	10	7	7	7	6	9	7	–	5	5	59
15–16 Dec 21	Panels Politics	103fm	—N/a	22	—N/a	—N/a	—N/a	20	9	10	7	7	7	7	10	7	4	5	5	65
15–16 Dec 21	Panels Politics	103fm	—N/a	—N/a	21	—N/a	—N/a	20	9	10	7	8	7	7	10	7	4	5	5	66
15–16 Dec 21	Panels Politics	103fm	—N/a	—N/a	—N/a	20	—N/a	20	10	10	7	7	7	7	10	7	5	5	5	66
12 Oct 21	Midgam	HaHadashot 12	34					18	9	8	7	7	7	5	6	6	4	5	4	58
12 Oct 21	Midgam	HaHadashot 12	—N/a	—N/a	20	—N/a	—N/a	20	11	11	8	7	8	5	11	6	4	5	4	64
20 Aug 21	Midgam	HaHadashot 12	32					20	9	8	6	8	7	6	6	6	4	4	4	60
20 Aug 21	Midgam	HaHadashot 12	24	—N/a	—N/a	—N/a	—N/a	20	9	10	6	8	7	7	10	–	–	–	–	–

== Prime minister ==
Due to the political deadlock, Shas chairman and Interior Minister Aryeh Deri suggested direct elections for prime minister. Some opinion pollsters have asked voters which party leader they would prefer as prime minister. Their responses are given as percentages in the graphs and tables below.

=== Various candidates ===
Date	Polling firm	Publisher	Netanyahu	Lapid	Bennett	Gantz	Sa'ar	Barkat	None	Undecided
6 Oct 22	Direct Polls	Channel 14	51	36	–	10	–	–	–	3
2–3 Oct 22	Maagar Mochot	Israel Hayom	41	27	–	10	–	–	–	22
29 Sep 22	Direct Polls	Channel 14	50	37	–	13	–	–	–	–
22 Sep 22	Direct Polls	Channel 14	50	35	–	11	–	–	–	4
24 Aug 22	Direct Polls	Channel 14	48	28	–	20	–	–	–	4
14 Aug 22	Direct Polls	Channel 14	48	29	–	16	–	–	7	
12 Jul 22	Direct Polls	Channel 14	42	21	–	16	–	–	–	21
21 Jun 22	Direct Polls	Channel 14	48	28	7	8	–	–	8	
10 Jun 22	Camil Fuchs	Channel 13	42	16	7	8	–	–	19	9
9 May 22	Camil Fuchs	Channel 13	46	15	9	9	–	–	–	–
6–7 Apr 22	Maagar Mohot	Israel Hayom	41	15	6	9	–	5	–	–
6 Apr 22	Direct Polls	Channel 14	45	22	8	13	–	–	12	
6 Apr 22	Camil Fuchs	Channel 13	47	13	10	5	3	–	–	22
28 Mar 22	Midgam	HaHadashot 12	45	17	9	7	–	–	–	22
21 Mar 22	Maagar Mohot	Israel Hayom	55	21	14	10	–	–	–	–
6 Mar 22	Camil Fuchs	Channel 13	50	17	20	12	–	–	–	1
18 Jan 22	Maagar Mohot	Israel Hayom	34	17	6	7	4	7	22	
28 Nov 21	Direct Polls	Channel 20	42.1	18.2	15.4	11.1	–	–	8.4	4.8
22 Nov 21	Maagar Mohot	Channel 20	54	24	9	7	6	–	–	–
18 Aug 21	Maagar Mohot	Channel 20	47	24	13	10	6	–	–	–
11–12 Aug 21	Maagar Mohot	Israel Hayom	51	23	12	9	5	–	–	–
14–15 Jul 21	Maagar Mohot	Israel Hayom	46	28	14	8	4	–	21	
12 Jul 21	Midgam	HaHadashot 12	40	24	14	–	–	–	14	8
22 Jun 21	Maagar Mohot	Channel 20	46	28	10	8	4	4	–	–
4 May 21	Camil Fuchs	Channel 13	39	31	14	–	–	–	–	–

=== Netanyahu vs. Lapid ===
Date	Polling firm	Publisher	Netanyahu	Lapid	Neither	Undecided
2 Oct 22	Camil Fuchs	Channel 13	45	33	–	–
14 Aug 22	Camil Fuchs	Channel 13	48	34	–	–
14 Aug 22	Midgam	HaHadashot 12	46	29	19	6
8 Aug 22	Camil Fuchs	Channel 13	43	32	–	–
8 Aug 22	Midgam	HaHadashot 12	42	31	18	9
8 Aug 22	Kantar	Kan 11	45	35	20	–
17 Jul 22	Camil Fuchs	Channel 13	45	32	15	7
12 Jul 22	Direct Polls	Channel 14	46	41	13	
11 Jul 22	Midgam	HaHadashot 12	44	31	–	–
11 Jul 22	Kantar	Kan 11	45	36	19	–
21 Jun 22	Direct Polls	Channel 14	50	40	10	
21 Jun 22	Camil Fuchs	Channel 13	51	30	–	–
21 Jun 22	Midgam	HaHadashot 12	47	31	18	4
21 Jun 22	Kantar	Kan 11	48	31	21	–
13 Jun 22	Midgam	HaHadashot 12	46	27	27	
6 Jan 22	Direct Polls	Channel 14	48	37	12	3
5 Dec 21	Midgam	HaHadashot 12	48	24	19	9
6 Oct 21	Smith	Galei Israel	53	34	–	–
20 Aug 21	Midgam	HaHadashot 12	47	31	17	5
23 May 21	Midgam	HaHadashot 12	40	35	–	25
23 May 21	Camil Fuchs	Channel 13	41	37	16	–
4 May 21	Camil Fuchs	Channel 13	41	36	–	–

=== Netanyahu vs. Gantz ===
Date	Polling firm	Publisher	Netanyahu	Gantz	Neither	Undecided
2 Oct 22	Camil Fuchs	Channel 13	45	30	–	–
14 Aug 22	Camil Fuchs	Channel 13	48	30	–	–
14 Aug 22	Midgam	HaHadashot 12	46	22	25	7
8 Aug 22	Camil Fuchs	Channel 13	46	29	–	–
8 Aug 22	Midgam	HaHadashot 12	43	23	26	8
8 Aug 22	Kantar	Kan 11	45	33	22	–
17 Jul 22	Camil Fuchs	Channel 13	46	29	16	8
11 Jul 22	Midgam	HaHadashot 12	43	24	–	–
11 Jul 22	Kantar	Kan 11	45	28	27	–
21 Jun 22	Camil Fuchs	Channel 13	47	29	–	–
21 Jun 22	Midgam	HaHadashot 12	46	26	23	5
13 Jun 22	Midgam	HaHadashot 12	46	21	33	
6 Oct 21	Smith	Galei Israel	53	31	–	–
20 Aug 21	Midgam	HaHadashot 12	47	26	21	6

=== Lapid vs. Gantz ===
Date	Polling firm	Publisher	Lapid	Gantz	Neither
28–29 Sep 22	Panels Politics	Maariv	35	27	38
20–21 Jul 22	Panels Politics	Maariv	26	28	–
11 Jul 22	Kantar	Kan 11	26	26	48

=== Netanyahu vs. Bennett ===
Date	Polling firm	Publisher	Netanyahu	Bennett	Neither	Undecided
21 Jun 22	Camil Fuchs	Channel 13	48	26	–	–
21 Jun 22	Midgam	HaHadashot 12	47	23	25	5
13 Jun 22	Midgam	HaHadashot 12	47	21	32	
6 Jan 22	Direct Polls	Channel 14	46	37	16	1
5 Dec 21	Midgam	HaHadashot 12	45	25	21	9
6 Oct 21	Smith	Galei Israel	48	33	–	–
20 Aug 21	Midgam	HaHadashot 12	45	25	23	7
13 Jun 21	Camil Fuchs	Channel 13	43	29	–	–

=== Bennett vs. Gantz ===
Date	Polling firm	Publisher	Bennett	Gantz	Neither	Undecided
6 Jan 22	Direct Polls	Channel 14	22	34	40	4

== Approval ratings ==
Naftali Bennett

Date	Polling firm	Publisher	Approve	Disapprove
5 Dec 21	Midgam	HaHadashot 12	44	47
20 Aug 21	Midgam	HaHadashot 12	40	51

Benny Gantz

Date	Polling firm	Publisher	Approve	Disapprove	Undecided
5 Dec 21	Midgam	HaHadashot 12	55	33	–
1 Oct 21	Midgam	HaHadashot 12	59	28	13
20 Aug 21	Midgam	HaHadashot 12	60	29	–

Yair Lapid

Date	Polling firm	Publisher	Approve	Disapprove	Undecided
5 Dec 21	Midgam	HaHadashot 12	42	47	–
1 Oct 21	Midgam	HaHadashot 12	45	42	13
20 Aug 21	Midgam	HaHadashot 12	43	45	–

Yifat Shasha-Biton

Date	Polling firm	Publisher	Approve	Disapprove	Undecided
5 Dec 21	Midgam	HaHadashot 12	41	41	–
1 Oct 21	Midgam	HaHadashot 12	42	45	13
20 Aug 21	Midgam	HaHadashot 12	38	48	–

Avigdor Liberman

Date	Polling firm	Publisher	Approve	Disapprove	Undecided
5 Dec 21	Midgam	HaHadashot 12	35	56	–
1 Oct 21	Midgam	HaHadashot 12	35	50	15
20 Aug 21	Midgam	HaHadashot 12	35	56	–

Ayelet Shaked

Date	Polling firm	Publisher	Approve	Disapprove	Undecided
5 Dec 21	Midgam	HaHadashot 12	33	51	–
1 Oct 21	Midgam	HaHadashot 12	36	44	20

Nitzan Horwitz

Date	Polling firm	Publisher	Approve	Disapprove	Undecided
1 Oct 21	Midgam	HaHadashot 12	46	42	12
20 Aug 21	Midgam	HaHadashot 12	43	43	–

Merav Michaeli

Date	Polling firm	Publisher	Approve	Disapprove	Undecided
14 Aug 22	Midgam	HaHadashot 12	31	57	12
1 Oct 21	Midgam	HaHadashot 12	39	43	18

Gideon Sa'ar

Date	Polling firm	Publisher	Approve	Disapprove	Undecided
1 Oct 21	Midgam	HaHadashot 12	39	36	25

Yoaz Hendel

Date	Polling firm	Publisher	Approve	Disapprove	Undecided
1 Oct 21	Midgam	HaHadashot 12	38	31	31

== See also ==
- Opinion polling for the 2026 Israeli legislative election
