= The Reservists (political party) =

Israeli political party

The Reservists המילואימניקים HaMiluimnikim
- Leader: Yoaz Hendel; Sandra Alon; Shlomi Damari
- Founder: Yoaz Hendel
- Founded: 18 September 2025
- Preceded by: Derekh Eretz
- Headquarters: Kiryat Shmona, Israel
- Ideology: Zionism; Reservist interests; Anti-conscription exemption
- Political position: Centre-right
- National affiliation: Zionist Home – The Reservists (July–September 2026); The Reservists - New Economic Party (September 2026–present)
- Colours: Olive green Yellow
- Knesset: 0 / 120

Election symbol
- די / دي (Reservists-NEP)

Website
- www.themiluimnikim.co.il

The Reservists (Hebrew: המילואימניקים, romanized: HaMiluimnikim) is an Israeli political party founded in 2025 by Yoaz Hendel, IDF Reserve Battalion Commander and former Israeli Minister of Communications. The party contested the 2026 election, which was held on 27 October 2026, in an alliance with the New Economic Party, and did not pass the electoral threshold, winning 2.63% of the vote.

== Background ==
Yoaz Hendel, an IDF reserves battalion commander, was originally affiliated with Likud. He first entered the Knesset in April 2019 with Benny Gantz's Blue and White party. He served as Ministry of Communications during the Netanyahu–Gantz government in 2020, and again during the Bennett–Lapid government from 2021 to 2022. He was in a number of factions during this period and considered running with Ayelet Shaked in the 2022 election before dropping out. Outside of politics, he started a movement also called The Reservists to promote universal enlistment, and stronger penalties for draft evasion.

== History ==
Hendel began the signature collection process in June 2025 to form a new party, which was officially launched in September 2025, and confirmed they would be contesting the 2026 election.

Other party co-founders and leaders include: lawyer and Reservist's wives forum leader Shvut Raanan, Major (Res.) Yoav Adomi, Captain (Res.) Yisrael ben-Shitrit, Mechina head Hadas Crissi, Lt. Colonel (Res.) Yonatan Bahat, Lt. Colonel (Res.) Erez ben-Ezra and other leading reservist interests activists. The party is advised by Aron Shaviv, who previously worked for Netanyahu during the 2015 election, and for David Cameron during the United Kingdom election a few months later.

76% of the registered party members voted electronically for new party leaders in February 2026, electing Sandra Alon and Shlomi Damari.

40 members of the party were expected to elect party leadership on 8 June. Hendel was elected as the party head.

The party selected its candidates on 16 June in "a digital vote". The party's slate was announced the next day: Yoav Adomi, Roi Frank, Erez Ben Ezra, Tehila Peretz, Shlomi Damari, and Amalya Kenan.

By early July, as the party had continued to fall below the electoral threshold in polls, Hendel announced on 7 July that he had allied with Hili Tropper, as well as Shira Shapira and Elyasaf Peretz, in an alliance named Yesodot Yisrael. The name of the alliance changed to Zionist Home – The Reservists later that month.

The alliance split in early September, with Hendel partnering with Yaron Zelekha's New Economic Party and Tropper joining Gadi Eisenkot's Yashar. Eisenkot was reportedly hesitant to include Hendel on his party's list. Einat Wilf joined the party on 7 September 2026. The party did not pass the 3.25% electoral threshold and won 2.63% of the vote.

== Policies ==
=== Political affiliation ===
The party does not formally affiliate itself with any political bloc, and does not rule out working with anyone, including Benjamin Netanyahu and Itamar Ben Gvir. It calls for the formation of a 'Zionist unity government' which includes all political parties currently in the Knesset besides the Arab and Ultraorthodox parties.

=== Israeli–Palestinian conflict ===
Hendel sees the Israeli–Palestinian conflict as a "clash of civilizations", seeing peace as unlikely without change that will take generations. He criticized the idea of using "investment and engagement" to "win hearts and minds", comparing it to a John Lennon song. He went on to say that the concept was a "mistake" which led to the 7 October attacks "with people coming to slaughter us and our kids."

=== Military service ===
A major issue for the party is conscription in Israel, most notably for Haredi and Arab Israelis, both of which are currently exempt from military service. As a result of operations in the Gaza war, the IDF has been having manpower shortages and is at risk of facing "severe harm." At the same time, there are about 80,000 Haredi men eligible for conscription, but fewer than 3,000 have enlisted. The Supreme Court has also ruled that there is no legal basis for not conscripting the Haredim. But as Haredi parties are part of the current governing coalition, the government has not yet conducted large-scale conscription. Hendel believes that his party is able to bypass this deadlock by acting as an alternative support base. Hendel also noted that the demographic imbalance is unsustainable, as 30% of the population is projected to be Haredi by 2065.

The party's main policy proposal is to mandate conscription for all Israeli citizens by imposing major sanctions on those who do not join military or national service. These punishments include revocation of the right to vote or become elected, cancellation of tax deductions, denial of welfare benefits, revocation of driver's license and prohibition on leaving the country. This plan is based on four key principles: 1) full national service for every Israeli citizen - secular and religious, Jewish or Arab; 2) legally equating evasion of military or alternative civil/national service to desertion; 3) creating a service environment that respects the faith and lifestyles of all those serving; 4) creating armed yeshivas along Israel's borders and a national service track that includes living and studying in those.

Concurrently, the party supports encouraging service by increasing benefits for veterans and reservists such as increasing tax credits and deductions, priority for reservists in recruitment for civil service jobs and for senior positions, priority for reservist businesses in state contracts, financial compensation for employers of reservists, housing and childcare benefits.

Overall, the party's movement is aimed at promoting universal military conscription by ending the draft exemptions and imposing harsh penalties for draft evasion.

=== Other issues ===
The party calls for a State Commission of Inquiry to investigate the October 7 attacks, as well as some judicial reform that has a "broad consensus." The party also announced its opposition to the original Levin Plan, also known as the 2023 Israeli judicial reform, initiated by the Netanyahu government, saying that some reform is necessary, but it cannot be imposed on the country. It is not clear if the party accepts the 2025 Levin-Sa'ar Plan, which is a scaled-back version of the 2023 plan.

== Election results ==
=== Knesset ===
Election	Leader	Votes	%	Seats	+/−	Government
2026	Yoaz Hendel	with NEP		0 / 120	New	Extra-parliamentary
