= Mordechai David =

Israeli far-right activist and social media personality

- מרדכי דוד
- Born: 1999 or 2000 (Note: Israel Hayom gave his age as 25 in November 2025 and CNN as 26 in July 2026, implying a birth year of 1999 or 2000. AFP described him as 27 in October 2026.)
- Occupations: Activist, social media personality
- Known for: Confronting opposition figures, journalists and left-wing activists on camera

Mordechai David (Hebrew: מרדכי דוד; born 1999 or 2000) is an Israeli far-right activist and social media personality. He tracks down people he regards as unpatriotic, including opposition politicians, journalists, left-wing and Arab–Jewish activists and the former Supreme Court president Aharon Barak, confronts them on camera and posts the footage to an online following of about 150,000. A pro-government activist, he is closely aligned with National Security Minister Itamar Ben-Gvir, who praised his activity as "a democratic mission" and recruited him to his campaign for the 2026 election.

Agence France-Presse described David as one of the most striking figures in the coarsening of Israel's political discourse before the 2026 election, and Israel Hayom wrote that within three years he had gone from an anonymous criminal defendant to one of the most influential figures in right-wing activism. According to the disinformation researcher Achiya Schatz, David stages his events chiefly for an online audience: "The physical event is just the backdrop."

Courts have issued several restraining orders against David at the request of journalists, activists and a witness in Netanyahu's corruption trial, and he has been detained or questioned by police over a number of incidents. As of February 2026 he had not been indicted; police said eight or nine cases against him were open. David describes his activity as legal protest and says he is not violent.

== Background ==
David lives in Bnei Brak. In February 2021, under a plea bargain, he was convicted of attempting to set fire to a bus during riots in Bnei Brak over the enforcement of COVID-19 restrictions. In February 2022, while doing community service at the Ramat Gan Safari as part of his sentence, he filmed a TikTok video from inside the crocodile enclosure that went viral. David did not serve in the Israel Defense Forces; in March 2026 he said the army "doesn't want me" because of his criminal record, and that attempts to resolve this through lawyers had failed. In August 2026, when he confronted former chief of staff Gadi Eisenkot, Eisenkot replied that David had not served in the army and told him to go and serve, then come back to him.

He began as a counter-protester at the 2023 demonstrations against the government's judicial overhaul, filming his arguments with protesters. After the October 7 attacks he became known for disrupting rallies calling for a deal to free the hostages held in Gaza. In July 2024 he set up Brothers for Justice, a network of WhatsApp groups that recruits volunteers, and in June 2025 he registered it as a nonprofit association, Brotherhood for Justice – Together We Will Win. The group brings right-wing activists, many of them apparently minors, to anti-government and hostage-release protests to heckle demonstrators; in a video David described its purpose as coming to "annoy" left-wing protesters.

== Social media ==
David films or livestreams his confrontations and posts them online, usually the same day; his TikTok account had about 72,000 followers in September 2024, and by October 2026 he had about 150,000 followers. He told AFP that "social media can be stronger than television" and that several of his videos that week had passed one million views. AFP linked his rise to a shift among young Israelis from traditional media to provocative online influencers, and noted that he has faced repeated complaints that his videos amount to harassment.

Schatz, founder of the monitoring group Fake Reporter, told AFP that a significant part of the Israeli right feels ignored and that David "channels their belligerence into political expression and entertainment". He said a few people were enough "to create an incident that generates 10 videos, hundreds of posts, television coverage and several days of political polemic".

== Methods ==
His methods have included:

- Blocking the cars of politicians, journalists and others as they leave events, sometimes by standing in front of or leaning on them; targets have included Gilad Kariv, Aharon and Ehud Barak, Guy Peleg and Eyal Berkovic.
- Following targets with a phone held to their face while questioning or taunting them.
- Bringing activists, sometimes with a megaphone, to the homes of targets or their relatives.
- Heckling at hostage-deal rallies and anti-government protests, a joint Israeli–Palestinian Memorial Day screening and a Joint List meeting.
- Recruiting volunteers through Brothers for Justice; after a restraining order in 2025 he said he would send other activists in his place every day.
- Editing footage for effect: AFP found that his video of a scuffle in Dizengoff Square was edited to suggest a major clash.
- Filing police complaints against people he confronts, threatening counter-complaints and trying to serve Naftali Bennett with a lawsuit.

== Causes and targets ==
His targets and causes have included:

- The judiciary and legal establishment, including Barak and Attorney General Gali Baharav-Miara.
- People involved in Netanyahu's trial, including journalists covering it and the prosecution witness Hadas Klein, at whom he shouted "Bibi, king of Israel forever".
- Protesters calling for a hostage deal or demonstrating against the government.
- Journalists, such as Peleg, who aired the Sde Teiman footage, and the Arab Israeli anchor Lucy Aharish.
- Critics of the army's conduct in Gaza, including the makers of the documentary NAZA, whom his protesters called "traitors".
- Left-wing and Arab–Jewish groups such as Standing Together, Looking the Occupation in the Eye, the joint memorial ceremony and the Arab-led Joint List.
- Asylum seekers and other foreign nationals in southern Tel Aviv.
- Tel Aviv's ban on gender segregation in public spaces, which he challenged with a segregated prayer service in 2026.

== Political ties ==
On 9 September 2024 Ben-Gvir hosted David in his Knesset office and praised his activity, calling it "a democratic mission". Minister May Golan called him "our right-wing fighter in the field". Ben-Gvir later brought David onto his campaign team for the October 2026 election to produce video content, and David is a favourite of the pro-government Channel 14. On 31 August 2026, in a video posted with Ben-Gvir, David announced that he had joined Otzma Yehudit and would co-chair the party's youth campaign headquarters with activist Victor Shriki.

== Notable confrontations ==
=== Politicians and officials ===
In November 2025 David blocked the car of Gilad Kariv, a member of the Knesset for The Democrats, as Kariv left a protest, and was detained for questioning. Kariv called him "a small and bored criminal". Police then issued an order barring David from approaching Kariv; despite it, he attended a session of the Knesset's National Security Committee on the harassment of journalists that Kariv had initiated, at the invitation of the committee chairman, Zvika Fogel of Otzma Yehudit.

On 28 January 2026 David and other activists blocked the car of Aharon Barak, then aged 89, as he left a conference of the Movement for Quality Government in Israel in Tel Aviv. David called him a "dictator" and the "Khamenei of our generation". A few days later he and others blocked the car of the former prime minister Ehud Barak. Opposition leader Yair Lapid called David a "miserable criminal" and urged police to act, and Yair Golan called him a "thug". David was questioned on suspicion of disturbing public order; beforehand he told reporters he was proud to have blocked both men and would do it again. Hebrew media later reported that police had dropped the investigation. Defending the confrontation to AFP, David said that "age doesn't get you a free pass" and accused Barak of "taking control of the State of Israel".

In June 2026, while under house arrest after a confrontation with the journalist Lucy Aharish, David was allowed by police to attend the Petah Tikva Magistrate's Court, where he tried to serve the former prime minister Naftali Bennett with a lawsuit and heckled him on camera. On 18 September 2026 he confronted Attorney General Gali Baharav-Miara at a Tel Aviv café and threatened to block her car; her bodyguards stopped him and escorted him outside.

=== Journalists ===
In October 2025 David confronted the journalists Or-ly Barlev and Aviad Glickman at Netanyahu's trial and was removed from the courtroom; Likud spokesman Guy Levy intervened on his behalf. A court later barred him from approaching Barlev. On 12 November 2025, after a lecture in Tel Aviv, he and other activists confronted the Channel 12 legal correspondent Guy Peleg, who had aired leaked footage of alleged abuse of a Palestinian detainee at the Sde Teiman facility. Filming Peleg at close range as police escorted him, David told him: "Anywhere in the world you'll need a police escort to walk to your car so we don't block you... You'll be blocked." Peleg said the group later blocked his car at a traffic light. David was questioned on suspicion of threatening Peleg and released on condition that he not contact him for 15 days. Four days after the incident he posted: "Even if you issue me a thousand restraining or harassment orders, remember that I have hundreds of activists, and every day I'll send ten others to do my work (all legally, of course)." On 27 November a magistrate's court granted Peleg a six-month restraining order, ruling that protest "is not a licence for threats or harassment", but rejected his request for a 500-metre distance as excessive and set it at two metres.

On 21 February 2026 David and another activist protested with a megaphone at the home of the Channel 13 presenter Lucy Aharish, entering her building and arguing with her husband, the actor Tsahi Halevi. Both activists were detained and released under a 14-day ban on contact with her. David said he had gone to her home "to protest, as is allowed in a democratic country". On 15 June 2026 he was arrested after blocking Aharish and Halevi near the Tel Aviv court; police suspected him of disturbing public order and assaulting people who were with them, and he was released to five days of house arrest. On 18 June a magistrate's court shortened the house arrest to end the next day, noting that the investigation was complete and the file had been passed to prosecutors to consider an indictment. The judge also told police to consider his lawyer's argument of selective enforcement, since the people David said had attacked him had not been questioned.

On 9 June 2026 David tried to stop the former footballer and broadcaster Eyal Berkovic from driving away in Ramat HaSharon by leaning on the hood of his car while filming. Police questioned David under caution on suspicion of invasion of privacy and causing a public disturbance and released him under restrictive conditions; Berkovic was also summoned over suspected reckless driving. In July 2026 CNN named David among the pro-government activists whose filmed street confrontations with journalists had raised alarm ahead of the October election.

=== Activists and witnesses ===
By December 2025 David was under restraining orders obtained by the anti-government activists Nava Rozolyo and Gonen Ben Itzhak.

In late January 2026 David and fellow activist Roi Star went to the home of Sigal Shukron, an activist with the anti-occupation group Looking the Occupation in the Eye. Shukron's family said David struck her partner, who was lightly injured; both men were questioned by police on suspicion of harassing a social activist. David told Haaretz that he had been attacked by Shukron's partner and had stepped back. On 29 January the Herzliya Magistrate's Court ordered the two men not to harass Shukron "in any way and in any place", to stay 50 metres from her home and workplace, and to delete posts that included her phone number.

On 6 April 2026 a magistrate's court ordered David to stay at least 50 metres from the home of Alon-Lee Green, co-director of Standing Together, and 25 metres from Green himself, for six months. The court found that David had "crossed from political protest into threatening harassment" when he went with others to Green's apartment door in March and banged on it. Green also said David had blocked his way to a shelter during an air-raid siren at a protest in Habima Square, which David denied.

In June 2026 Hadas Klein, a prosecution witness in Netanyahu's trial, complained to police that David had followed her near a protest in Habima Square and held a phone to her face, and that he and a friend later waited by her car in a car park and blocked it with his own until police escorted her out. David said he had not touched her and that she "can complain until tomorrow". A court barred him from coming within 50 metres of her, and on 13 July a Tel Aviv court extended the order, finding that his conduct "crosses the line between a legitimate protest and a protest of a disturbing and threatening nature", and ordered him to pay 4,000 shekels in costs. The judge noted that four earlier orders had already been issued against him for threatening harassment. David was represented by the lawyer Yoram Sheftel.

=== Demonstrations ===
On 20 April 2026, Memorial Day eve, David and about 20 protesters went to a Tel Aviv café screening the joint Israeli–Palestinian Memorial Day ceremony, shouted through megaphones, cursed attendees and followed them as they left, until police separated the two sides. On 30 April he organised a protest march in southern Tel Aviv against foreign nationals after a series of assaults attributed to a local gang. Residents said marchers chased and threatened people and business owners, and shops closed early. Police detained David on suspicion of disturbing public order, saying he had made inciting statements against the foreign nationals and ignored officers' instructions; he was released after questioning.

In September 2026, days before Rosh Hashanah, David tried to hold a gender-segregated prayer service in Tel Aviv's Dizengoff Square, where the city bars gender segregation in public spaces. About 20 men took part. When police removed the dividing barriers there was a brief commotion, but AFP reported that the video David posted afterwards was edited to look like a major clash.

On 16 September 2026 David led dozens of protesters outside the Savyon home of the parents of Rachel Szor, co-director of NAZA, in which Israeli soldiers and intelligence officers describe civilian deaths in Gaza. Protesters chanted "death sentence for traitors", and in a video David said of the directors, "Wherever they go, we'll chase them, legally." On 5 October he tried to block the entrance to a Joint List meeting in Tel Aviv.

== Law enforcement ==
In December 2025 Haaretz reported that the Shin Bet had twice warned David over the previous year to avoid violence. David confirmed that he had been contacted by people who said they were Shin Bet agents and told him he would be arrested if his actions turned violent. "I told them I may be annoying, but I also won't raise a hand against anyone; I'm not violent," he said.

In February 2026 Maariv reported that, although David had repeatedly been detained, he had been released each time without arrest or indictment, and that critics accused police of going easy on him. Police denied selective enforcement; a police source said eight or nine cases against him were open and that he had been questioned under caution several times.
