= Yoaz Hendel =

Israeli historian and politician (born 1975)

- יועז הנדל
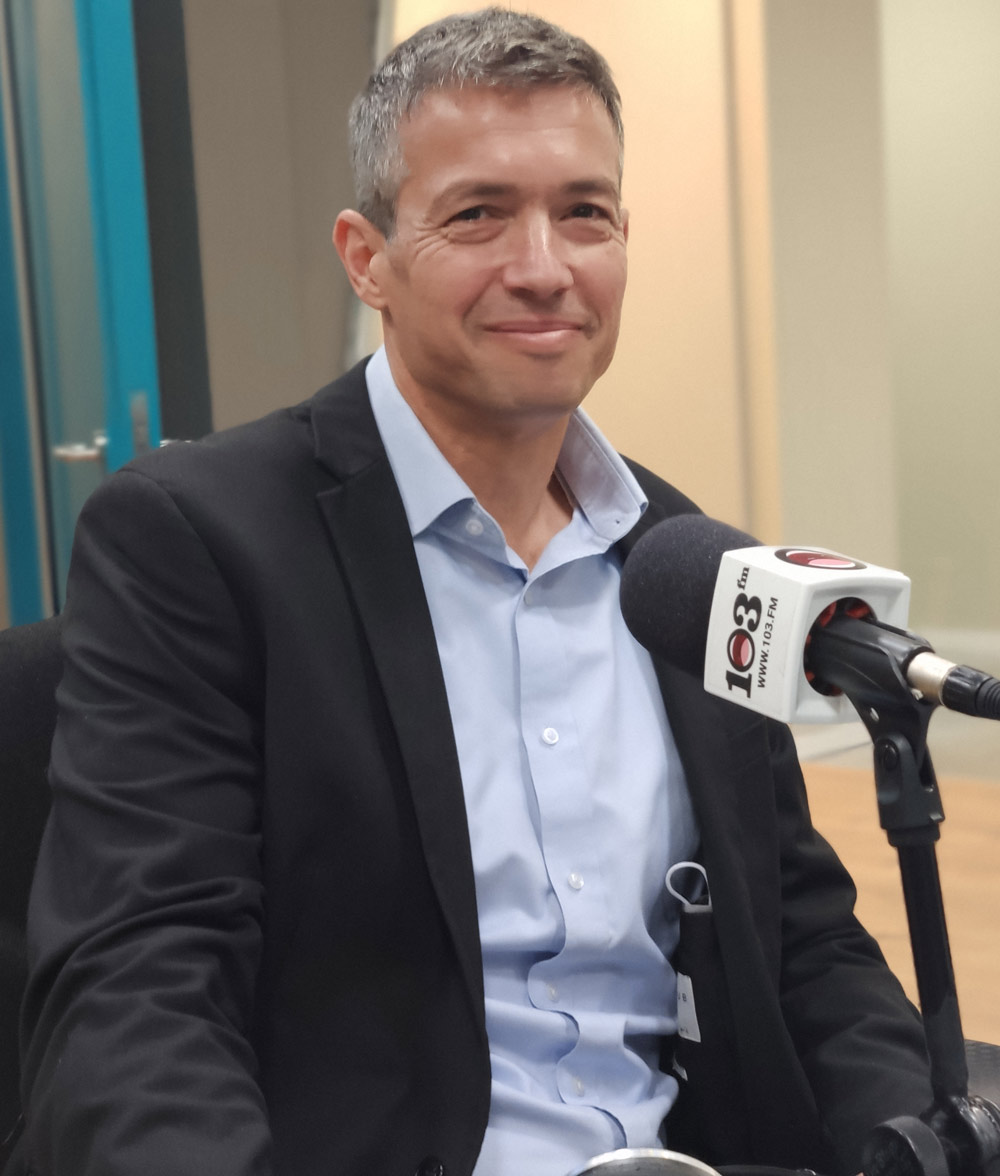

Ministerial roles
- 2020: Minister of Communications
- 2021–2022: Minister of Communications

Faction represented in the Knesset
- 2019–2020: Blue and White
- 2020–2021: Derekh Eretz
- 2021: New Hope

Personal details
- Born: 22 May 1975 (age 51) Petah Tikva, Israel

Yoaz Hendel (Hebrew: יועז הנדל; born 22 May 1975) is an Israeli politician and public figure who served as Minister of Communications and as a member of the Knesset. Additionally, he is the founder and chairman of the Miluimnikim ("Reservists") Movement and is the founder of The Reservists, a party of the same name. Hendel holds a doctorate in history and previously served as a lecturer in the Department of Political Science at Bar-Ilan University. Before entering politics, he worked in the defense establishment, was a journalist and columnist, hosted radio and television programs, and served as head of the Institute for Zionist Strategies.

== Biography ==
Yoaz Hendel was born in Petah Tikva to Miriam and Yona Hendel. His father immigrated from Romania in 1961. Yoaz was raised in Elkana, a West Bank settlement, in a religious-nationalist household. In high school, he decided to stop wearing a kippah.

In 1993, Hendel enlisted in the IDF and volunteered for the naval commando unit ("Shayetet 13"). He completed the commando training and later attended the infantry officers' course. Afterwards, he returned to Shayetet 13 as a team commander and later served as a company commander, including during Operation Grapes of Wrath. Hendel was discharged after approximately six and a half years but continued serving in various security positions until the age of 29, including a role in the Shin Bet during the Second Intifada.

Hendel is a lieutenant colonel in the reserves and has participated in multiple military operations, including the Second Lebanon War, Operation Cast Lead, Operation Protective Edge, and the Iron Swords War. In 2015, he established the Omer Unit, a special reserve command unit composed of veterans from elite units such as the Shayetet 13, Sayeret Matkal (the special reconnaissance unit), and Shaldag (the air force's special unit). After leaving politics, he returned to the reserves and fought in the Iron Swords War as the commander of Battalion 8555.

In August 2011, Hendel was appointed head of the National Information Division in the Prime Minister's Office. In early 2012, Prime Minister Benjamin Netanyahu selected him as a member of the negotiating team with the Palestinians in Jordan. However, the talks ended on 26 January 2012. In February 2012, Hendel resigned due to the Natan Eshel affair.

Hendel earned a doctorate in history from Tel Aviv University, focusing on intelligence methods in the ancient world, from the Hasmonean Revolt to the Bar Kokhba Revolt. During his studies, he was a research fellow at the Jaffe Center for Strategic Studies, publishing several studies on Israeli intelligence, the Second Lebanon War, and guerrilla warfare.

From 2009 to 2013, Hendel served as a lecturer in courses on terrorism and guerrilla warfare at Bar-Ilan University. He was a regular columnist for Yedioth Ahronoth and Makor Rishon and hosted and participated in various radio and television programs on current affairs.

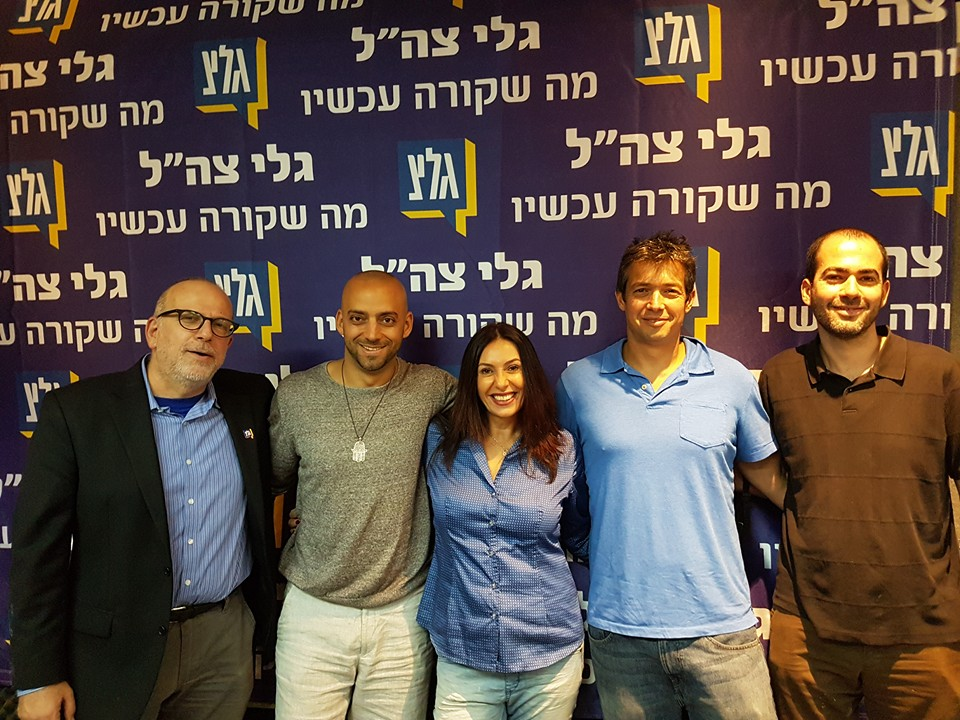
Hendel at Army Radio station, 2016 Yaron Deckel, Idan Raichel, Miri Regev, Yoaz Hendel, Dr. Asael Lubotzky

In 2010, Hendel co-authored Let the IDF Win with Professor Zaki Shalom, analyzing the Second Intifada and the fight against terrorist organizations. The book won the first Moldovan Military Literature Prize that year. In 2011, he co-authored Israel vs. Iran – The Shadow War with journalist Yaakov Katz, detailing the covert war between Israel and Iran.

In December 2015, he published his fourth book, In an Unsown Land – An Israeli Journey, which explored Israeli society, its various factions, and the political and security challenges facing the country. Journalist Raanan Shaked described it as a modern right-wing counterpart to Amos Oz's Here and There in the Land of Israel.

In 2016, he appeared in an episode of the series And the Land Was Chaos, focusing on the Hasmonean Revolt.

== Political career ==
Hendel was appointed Director of Communications and Public Diplomacy for Prime Minister Netanyahu in August 2011 and in early 2012 as a member of the negotiation team with the Palestinians in Jordan. He resigned from his post on 21 February 2012, after Netanyahu told him he had lost confidence in him for having informed the Attorney General Yehuda Weinstein of possible sexual harassment by the Prime Minister's bureau chief Natan Eshel. This information eventually led to an investigation by the Civil Service Commission and Eshel's resignation. Hendel and Cabinet Secretary Zvi Hauser, who was also reprimanded by Netanyahu for the same reason, told Netanyahu that they had not updated him in order to not implicate him in the affair.

The Movement for Quality Government in Israel awarded Hendel the title of "Knight of Quality Government 2012" in the Maintenance of Government Quality and Integrity Category in October 2012 for revealing the scandal. A year later he received the social prize of excellence by Ometz.

He joined the Telem party led by former Defense Minister Moshe Ya'alon in January 2019. The party, along with Yesh Atid and Hosen Yisrael, joined the Blue and White slate the following month ahead of the April 2019 Israeli legislative election. Hendel was placed ninth on the Blue and White slate and entered the 22nd Knesset on 3 October 2019.

Hendel and Hauser formed their own political faction in March 2020, Derekh Eretz, with Hendel serving as chairman.

=== Minister of Communications ===
==== First ministry (2020) ====
Hendel was appointed as Minister of Communications for the thirty-fifth government of Israel in May 2020. He announced a reform to solve the issue of fake text messages in June 2020. This problem was prevalent as various groups were taking advantage of other peoples' cell phone numbers and sending phony messages in their name, while assuming their identity. He led a major reform, enabling and regulating the spread of advanced fiber optic internet throughout Israel.

He adopted the recommendations of the Rosen Committee regarding the Israeli Postal Service, which were originally issued February 2019, but not implemented by two previous Ministers of Communications, Ayoob Kara and Dudi Amsalem. Hendel requested in June 2020 that the Director-General of Israel's Government Advertising Agency provide the advertising statistics regarding Facebook, in order to reduce the number of governmental advertisements on Facebook and Google, in light of the global protests against them.

He visited Rwanda in November 2020 and met with Rwandan President Paul Kagame to sign a bilateral agreement between the two countries to promote communications and technological entrepreneurship. He also met with the Rwandan Minister of Communications during the visit.

He announced with Zvi Hauser on 9 December 2020 that they will join Gideon Sa'ar's new party, New Hope. This resulted in him being fired as minister of communications. He recommended the approval of Hot joining IBC's fiber optics initiative the following day, and he published a hearing for the reduction of Bezeq's landline rates.

==== Second ministry (2021–2022) ====
Hendel was placed fourth on New Hope's list for the 2021 elections. He retained his seat in the Knesset as New Hope won six seats. He again became Minister of Communications in June 2021 for the thirty-sixth government of Israel. He resigned his Knesset seat under the Norwegian Law and was replaced by Zvi Hauser.

He approved the cancellation of the separation between internet supplier and infrastructure a few days after taking office, enabling customers to purchase internet service via a single provider. Previously, customers had to purchase internet infrastructure and the service separately. He led the decision to lower telephone landline rates by 40% in December 2021. His postal reform was approved in March 2022, allowing private competition with Israel Postal Company.

He signed a unification agreement with the Yamina party, led by Ayelet Shaked, ahead of the 2022 election to create the "Zionist Spirit" list, and was placed second. However, they announced the dissolution of their political partnership in September of that year following differences of opinion. He then announced that he was taking a break from political life.

=== The Reservists ===
Hendel began the signature collection process to form a new party in June 2025, which was officially launched as The Reservists in September 2025, and confirmed they would be contesting the 2026 election. The party consists of "reservists, families of reservists, wounded IDF soldiers, bereaved families and civilian volunteers", and does not rule out working with anyone, including Netanyahu, Itamar Ben Gvir, or Mansour Abbas. The party's platform calls for a Zionist government and a committee of inquiry to investigate the October 7 attacks, as well as some judicial reform that has a "broad consensus". A major issue for the party is conscription for all citizens, including Haredi and Arabs currently exempt from service, and would condition the right to vote on some form of national service. The party is advised by Aron Shaviv, who previously worked for Netanyahu during the 2015 election, and for David Cameron during the United Kingdom election a few months later.

In June 2026, Hendel reportedly began meeting with Benny Gantz of Blue and White to negotiate a potential electoral alliance. Later in the month, despite indications that Gantz, Hendel and Dedi Simchi were going to announce an alliance, negotiations between the parties continued, with Hendel seeking to preserve its status as a potential kingmaker, while Haredi conscription proved to be a source of disagreement between the potential partners. The following week, the negotiations with Gantz had collapsed, with Hendel and Tropper in talks to run together.

By early July, as the party fell below the electoral threshold in polling, Hendel announced on 7 July that he had allied with former communications minister Hili Tropper in a new alliance, named Foundations of Israel. The alliance was renamed Zionist Home – The Reservists later that month.

In September, the alliance separated as Tropper decided instead to join Yashar. Hendel reportedly discussed joining Yashar with party leader Gadi Eisenkot, but this did not take place because Hendel wanted to join the party under an independent faction named The Reservists, which Eisenkot opposed. Afterwards, Hendel formed an electoral alliance with economist Yaron Zelekha and his New Economic Party. The alliance would "join only a Zionist government" and "demand that a universal draft law be passed before a government is formed", with its platform focused on the need to "fight tycoons and the cost of living" and "full universal service" for all Israelis. The party did not pass the electoral threshold in the 2026 Israeli legislative election, winning 2.63% of the vote.

== Views and opinions ==
Hendel is a self-described liberal nationalist with a right-wing pragmatic approach. He is generally considered to be on the center-right of Israeli politics.

The Institute for Zionist Studies, with Hendel as chairman, announced in March 2013 the establishment of a human rights organization called The Blue and White Human Rights Association. Hendel argues in his columns that the real right to the Land of Israel is accompanied by a moral debt. During the establishment conference, it was argued that Zionism is not a monopoly of the right, and human rights are not a monopoly of the left. The organization intends to operate at the crossings checkpoints where the IDF is present, to assist at points of friction, in schools to educate on the importance of purity of arms and with the help of a group of physicians, to provide free medical treatment regardless of religion, race or sex. Unlike other human rights organizations operating in the territories, the policy is not to provide information to the media about human rights violations, but to give the information to the army's authorized investigations. The human rights organization by Hendel deals with public relations on behalf of Israel, and presents the "efforts and the great moral advantage" of the Zionist movement.

Hendel also views Haredi conscription as a major issue. He believes that IDF manpower shortages could be alleviated through the conscription of the estimated 80,000 eligible Haredim, of whom less than 3,000 have enlisted. Despite a ruling from the Supreme Court in 2024 mandating conscription, it has not been enforced due to the participation of Haredi parties in the governing coalition. Hendel also notes the demographic imbalance as unsustainable, with 30% of the population projected to be Haredi by 2065.

Regarding the Israeli–Palestinian conflict, Hendel sees it as a "clash of civilizations", seeing peace as unlikely without change that will take generations. He criticized the idea of using investment and engagement to win hearts and minds as like a John Lennon song, which is a mistake that led to the 7 October attacks "with people coming to slaughter us and our kids".

== Personal life ==
Hendel is married to Shiri, has four children, and lives in Nes Harim.

== Published works ==
=== Books ===
- Yoaz Hendel; Zaki Shalom. Let the IDF Win: The Self-Fulfilling Slogan (Yedioth Ahronoth Books, 2010).
- Yoaz Hendel. Daddy goes to reserve service. (Yedioth Books, 2011).
- Yaakov Katz; Yoaz Hendel. Israel vs. Iran (Zmora -Bitan Books, April 2011, Potomac Books 2012) Google Books
- Yoaz Hendel. In an Unsown Land: An Israeli Journey (Yedioth Ahronoth Books, 2016).
- Yoaz Hendel; Reuven Rivlin. Conversations on Israeli Hope (Yedioth Ahronoth Books and Chemed Books, 2018).

=== Select publications ===
- "Iran's nukes and Israel's dilemma". Middle East Quarterly (30 April 2013)
- "Why we lean to the political right in Israel". The Guardian (20 January 2013)
- "Terrorism and Piracy", in Culture and Civilization, (ed) I. L. Horowitz (Transaction Publishers, Rutgers N.J), January 2011
- "Pirates: Not Only in the Caribbean", BESA Center Perspectives Papers, No.106, 14 April 2010.
- "The Lone Terrorist", BESA Center Perspectives Papers, No.86, 13 July 2009.
- "Did Israel's Military Action in Gaza Make Israel More Secure", in: Global Issues – Selections from CQ Researcher, (ed) D. Repetto (London 2009), 77.
- Review of Rose Mary Sheldon's book: Spies of the Bible: Espionage in Israel from the Exodus to the Bar Kokhba Revolt, The Journal of Military History, Volume 72, Number 2, April 2008.
- "The Reserves Comeback", Strategic Assessment, Volume 10, no. 4 (February 2008)
- "Arab Culture in the Eyes of the West", Strategic Assessment, Volume 9, no.4 (March 2007) (with A. Mansour).
- "Conceptual Flaws on the Road to the Second Lebanon War", Strategic Assessment, Volume 10, no. 1 (June 2007) (with Z. Shalom).
- "IDF Special Units: Their Purpose and Operational Concept", Strategic Assessment, Volume 10, No. 2 (August 2007).
- "Failed Tactical Intelligence in the Lebanon War", Strategic Assessment, Volume 9, no. 3 (November 2006)
