= Yaron Zelekha =

Israeli economist and politician

- ירון זליכה
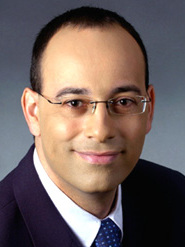

Accountant General of the Ministry of Finance
- In office 2003–2007
- Preceded by: Nir Gilad
- Succeeded by: Shuki Oren

Personal details
- Born: 20 July 1970 (age 56)
- Spouse: Orly Zelekha
- Education: Bar Ilan University

Yaron Zelekha (Hebrew: ירון זליכה; born 20 July 1970) is an Israeli economist and political figure who heads the New Economic Party.

== Biography ==
Zelekha was born to Iraqi-Jewish immigrants and grew up in Ramat Gan. His father was a branch manager for Bank Leumi. After completing high school, Zelekha did his military service in the Israel Defense Forces in the Research Department of the Military Intelligence Directorate. After his discharge in 1991, he studied economics at Bar-Ilan University, earning a bachelor's degree in 1994. He earned a doctorate in economics from Bar-Ilan University in 2001. Zelekha is married to Orly and has three children.

== Accounting and academic career ==
He subsequently worked as an accountant. From 1995 to 1997, he was a lecturer in accounting at the College of Management Academic Studies. He entered public service in 1996 as an economist for the Prime Minister's Office and was appointed head of the Accounting Department at Ono Academic College in 1998. Zelekha was an Israeli Ministry of Finance accountant general during 2003–2007. He was a key witness, according to state comptroller's office, who testified against Ehud Olmert in his role of finance minister in a case of alleged bribery during the sale of the Bank Leumi's controlling shares. Zelekha said that the State of Israel is more corrupt than it appears.

In 2011, Zelekha was chosen to head a committee for examining centralization in the private vehicle market in Israel.

== Political career ==
In December 2020, Zelekha formed the New Economic Party based on an economic vision and said he would run as a candidate in the March 2021 national election in Israel. The New Economic Party did not win any seats in the election.

The New Economic Party formed a joint list with Yoaz Hendel's The Reservists in early September 2026, ahead of the 2026 Israeli legislative election, with Zelekha in the second slot.
