= Zvi Hauser =

Israeli politician

- צבי האוזר
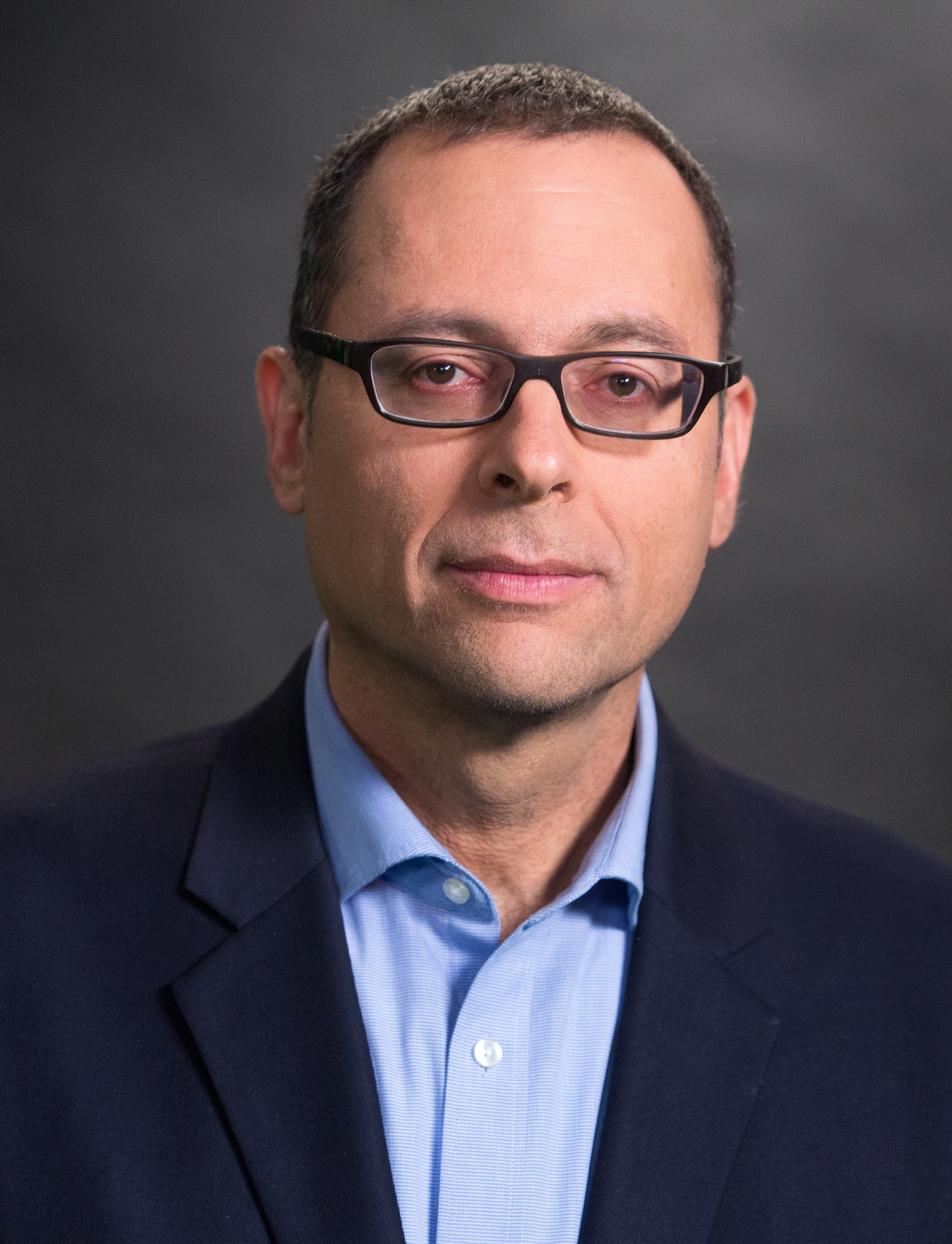

Israeli Cabinet Secretary
- 2009-2013: 17th Cabinet secretary

Faction represented in the Knesset
- 2019–2020: Blue and White
- 2020–2021: Derekh Eretz
- 2021–2022: New Hope

Personal details
- Born: 5 July 1968 (age 58) Ramat Gan, Israel

Zvi Hauser (Hebrew: צבי האוזר; born 5 July 1968) is an Israeli lawyer and public figure who served as the 17th cabinet secretary. Hauser served as a member of the Knesset between 2019 and 2022. During this term he held a number of positions including: deputy speaker of the Knesset, chairman of the Foreign Affairs and Defense Committee and head of the Israel-Japan Parliamentary Friendship Association.

During 2023, Hauser was recognized as an Adjunct Professor at Shizenken University in Tokyo, Japan.

== Biography ==
Zvi Hauser was born in Ramat Gan to Mordechai and Yehudit Hauser, the youngest of three. He was born with a heart defect and went through successful open heart surgery at the age of eight. At the age of eleven he played basketball for Maccabi Ramat Gan. He attended Blich high school in Ramat Gan, where he served as the national chairman of the youth wing of the Tehiya Party.

Hauser enlisted as part of Israel's mandatory military service and served in the IDF's School of Leadership Development. Among his roles there he also served as the schools commander of the public diplomacy unit. After his release from the IDF, he became a professional assistant to the director-general of the Ministry of Labor and Welfare, Shmuel Slavin. Following that he worked as the assistant to the chairman of the Board of Directors of the government-owned company Amidar; a provider of subsidized and rent-controlled housing.

In 1992, he became the Spokesperson for the National Union of Israeli Students. The following year, he served as a Media Adviser to the Likud party and to the then-Chairman of the Opposition, Benjamin Netanyahu. After two years he left this position to complete his legal internship. Hauser was also a member of the University Disciplinary Court of Appeals at Tel Aviv University.

He graduated from Tel Aviv University's faculty of law in 1994, completed a legal internship at Pinchas Marinsky & Co. law firm, and became a member of the Israel Bar Association in 1996. From 2000 to 2009, Hauser worked in the private sector and became a law firm partner at Goldfarb Seligman & Co. in Tel Aviv. He headed the firm's Communications and Media Department.

At the same time, he continued his public service being a board member for several government owned companies including the Tel Aviv Port "Otzar Mif'aley Yam" and Mikve Israel. He was also a member of the Public Council for the Commemoration of Theodor Herzl and the Management Committee on the Council for Preserving Heritage Sites in Israel between the years 2008 and 2009.

== Regulation, Communication and Broadcasting ==
When Prime Minister Benjamin Netanyahu formed Israel's 27th government in 1996, Hauser was appointed Senior Professional Adviser to Minister of Communications, Limor Livnat. In this capacity, he served as the Coordinator of the Inter-Ministerial Committee for Enhancing Competition in the Telecommunications Market, and as the Coordinator for the Ministry of Communications for Increasing Competition in the Broadcasting Market. He also was a member of the public committee for expanding broadcasting services in the state of Israel and served as a member of the Inter-Ministerial Committee for Regulating National Radio Broadcasting.

In 1997, Hauser was appointed as the chairman of the Cable and Satellite Broadcasting Council and as the chairman of the Administration for Regulating Broadcasts for the Public. In 1999 he was also appointed as the chairman of the Israeli Rating Committee. Later on, in 2002, he served as a member of the Public Committee for Examining the Future of Israeli Educational Television.

He was involved in the establishment of the 'Israel News' Company, which served as Channel 10's news company. From 2004 to 2009, he served as the director for the "Dori Media Group" (DMG), a traded company on the AIM London Stock Exchange.

== Cabinet Secretary ==
In April 2009, upon the establishment of the Thirty-second government of Israel headed by Prime Minister Benjamin Netanyahu, Hauser was appointed as Israel's 17th Cabinet Secretary and served in that position until 2013 under the Thirty-third government of Israel.

Besides the responsibility of setting the Cabinet's agenda and ministerial committee meetings as well as managing the inner workings of the Office, he simultaneously served as the Secretary of The Ministers Committee on Security Affairs ('The Political-Security Cabinet'). In this position, Hauser liaised between the cabinet and the Knesset (Israeli parliament), and between the cabinet and the President of Israel. He was also deputy to the director general of the Office of the Prime Minister and served as the Cabinet's spokesperson.

Hauser co-Chaired Masa Israel Journey, an organization that brings young Jewish adults to Israel to strengthen their bond with Israel and the Jewish people. He served as a member for Western Wall Heritage Foundation, Independence Hall and initiated the Moreshet Program, a national program for preserving restoring national heritage sites.

With the formation of the 33rd government, in January 2013, Hauser announced his desire to end his term after more than four years in office. Hauser continued to serve as the 33rd Secretary of Government until the appointment of Maj. Gen. Avichai Mandelblit, who served as the Military Advocate General, in May 2013. In the background of the termination of Hauser's role as Cabinet Secretary was the complaint, he filled with Yoaz Hendel and Yohanan Locker about the actions of Natan Eshel, the prime minister's close confidant.

=== After his tenure as Cabinet Secretary ===
Hauser served on a number of government and public committees, including chairman of the Public Committee for the Examination of computing Elections to the Knesset and Local Authorities; member of the advisory team on the issues of prayer arrangements at the Western Wall; member of the Exceptions Committee regarding the entry of the remaining Falash Mura community members in Ethiopia.

Hauser, in 2013, Hauser joined the academic staff of Hebrew University's School of Public Policy and Government. Within this framework, Hauser lectured to graduated students. In addition, Hauser served as a senior fellow at Kohelet Policy Forum.

In 2014, Hauser became the chairman of the Alumni Organization of Tel Aviv University's faculty of law.

Between the years 2017 and 2019, Hauser founded and headed the Coalition for the Israeli Golan, promoting recognition of Israeli sovereignty over the Golan Heights. In 2018, Hauser published an article in which he expressed his position that Israel's interest should be in splitting Syria into Several entities, and in American involvement in what is happening there (to prevent the strengthening of Iran and Turkey in Syria). In addition, he presented the Israeli interest in the Golan by expanding the Jewish settlement and reach 100,000 Jewish settlers in the region by 2030.

Hauser currently serves also as the chairman of The Land of Israel's Museum (aka Eretz Israel Museum) in Tel Aviv and as a member of the International Executive Committee of The Albert Einstein Foundation.

== Political career ==
Hauser is identified with the conservative right. In the run-up to the 21st Knesset elections, Hauser joined Moshe Ya'alon and Telem and was placed 14th on the Blue and White list. The party received 35 seats and Hauser entered the 21st Knesset for the first time.

He served as the chairman of the Knesset's Foreign Affairs and Defense Committee, and the chairman of the Knesset Israel-Japan Parliamentary Friendship Group. On 7 July 2020, Hauser was elected to represent the parliamentary body on the committee to Appoint Judges.

In March 2020, Hauser and Yoaz Hendel formed their own political faction, Derekh Eretz. On 9 December 2020, Hauser and Hendel announced that they will join Gideon Sa'ar's new party, New Hope. Hauser was placed eighth on New Hope's list for the 2021 elections, but failed to retain his seat as New Hope only won six seats.

In June 2021, Hendel became minister of communications in Naftali Bennett's government and resigned his Knesset seat under the Norwegian Law. Hauser returned to the Knesset as Hendel's replacement.

On 20 October 2021, he was elected as representative of the Knesset in the committee that nominates candidates for the position of attorney general, and chairman of the Strategy and Policy Subcommittee in the Foreign Affairs and Security Committee. During this Knesset term, he was also appointed deputy speaker of the Knesset; deputy chairman of the Subcommittee on People Eligible for Citizenship Under the Law of Return and Relations with the Diaspora in the Constitution, Law and Justice Committee; and a member of the Economy Committee. He also served in this Knesset term as chairman of the Lobby for Heritage Sites and National Heritage Properties.

In this Knesset, Hauser also served as the chairman of the Israel-Japan Inter-Parliamentary Friendship Association. For his work to strengthen the relationship between the countries, he was awarded the Japanese Foreign Minister's decoration for the year 2022—a decoration awarded to "individuals and groups with outstanding achievements in international fields, in order to acknowledge their contributions to the promotion of friendship between Japan and other countries and areas."

As part of this term, Hauser led the Knesset to adopt the IHRA's working definition of anti-Semitism.

== Post-parliamentary career ==
After the end of his term in the Twenty-Fourth Knesset, Hauser returned to the private sector and focused his activities on strengthening bilateral relations between Israel and Japan, as well as the trilateral relationship between Israel, Japan, and the United States. In January 2024, during the Israel–Hamas war, he co-authored an opinion article with the Japan Society in The Japan Times, arguing that the time had come for Japan to take a more central role in strategic discourse concerning the Middle East.

He later published a similar call in the Japanese economic newspaper Nikkei, becoming one of only two Israelis to have published opinion pieces in the newspaper. Later that year, Hauser co-authored an opinion article with Andrew Seidel in The Wall Street Journal, calling on Japan to join the Abraham Accords and arguing that such a move could strengthen Japan’s strategic standing, deepen cooperation with the United States, and contribute to regional stability in the Middle East.

== Personal life ==
Hauser was married to Hila Tov and have two sons, including Michael Hauser Tov, the political correspondent of Haaretz. After a decade of marriage, the two divorced.

His current spouse is Dalia Bodinger, a vice president of Elbit Systems.

Hauser is a collector of Israeliana.
