= Roi Star =

Israeli social media personality

- רועי סטאר

Roi Star is an Israeli ultranationalist influencer. Star commonly attends protests with left-wing activists.

== Career ==
In January 2026, Star forcibly entered a home in the West Bank, pepper spraying activists. He was arrested during a protest in Habima Square after reportedly pepper spraying other protesters.

Both Star and fellow activist Mordechai David, who also appeared at the homes of several left-wing activists, were barred by an Israeli court from harassing Sigal Shukron from the anti-occupation group Looking the Occupation in the Eye.

In April 2026, TikTok removed Star's account for violating bullying and hate speech roles, after videos of Roi harassing activists in the occupied West Bank were flagged by The Guardian.
