= Shvut Raanan =

Israeli activist

- שבות רענן
- Born: Shvut Halperin; April 30, 1993 (age 33); Psagot, Israel
- Citizenship: Israel
- Education: Bar Ilan University; Hebrew University of Jerusalem
- Occupation: Lawyer
- Years active: November 2023–present
- Employer(s): Meitar law firm Haifa District Court; Self-employment
- Political party: The Reservists (2025–2026)
- Spouse: Tzur Raanan

Shvut Raanan (Hebrew: שבות רענן; born 1993) is an Israeli lawyer and social activist. She represents wives of Israel Defense Forces reservists, particularly following the 7 October 2023 attack. Raanan, who resides in northern Israel, has advocated through media appearances, protests, and forums for equitable reserve duty burdens, economic support for reservists' families, and policy reforms on military service equality. Raanan is a political candidate for the Knesset in the 2026 election.

== Biography ==
Shvut began her law studies at Bar Ilan University in 2014 and graduated in 2019.

Following the October 7 attacks, Ra'anan became the head of policy for the IDF Reservists' wives forum. She has advocated through media appearances, protests, and forums for equitable reserve duty burdens, economic support for reservists' families, and policy reforms on military service equality. In 2025, Ra'anan co-founded The Reservists political party, and is one of the party's candidates for the Knesset in the 2026 election.

On 1 December 2025, she stated at a meeting of the Foreign Affairs and Defense Committee in the Knesset that the reservists were the manpower of the state.

=== Personal life ===
In 2013, she got engaged to Tzur, and they got married in 2015. They have five children.
