= Eli Avidar =

Israeli politician

- אֵלִי אֲבִידָר
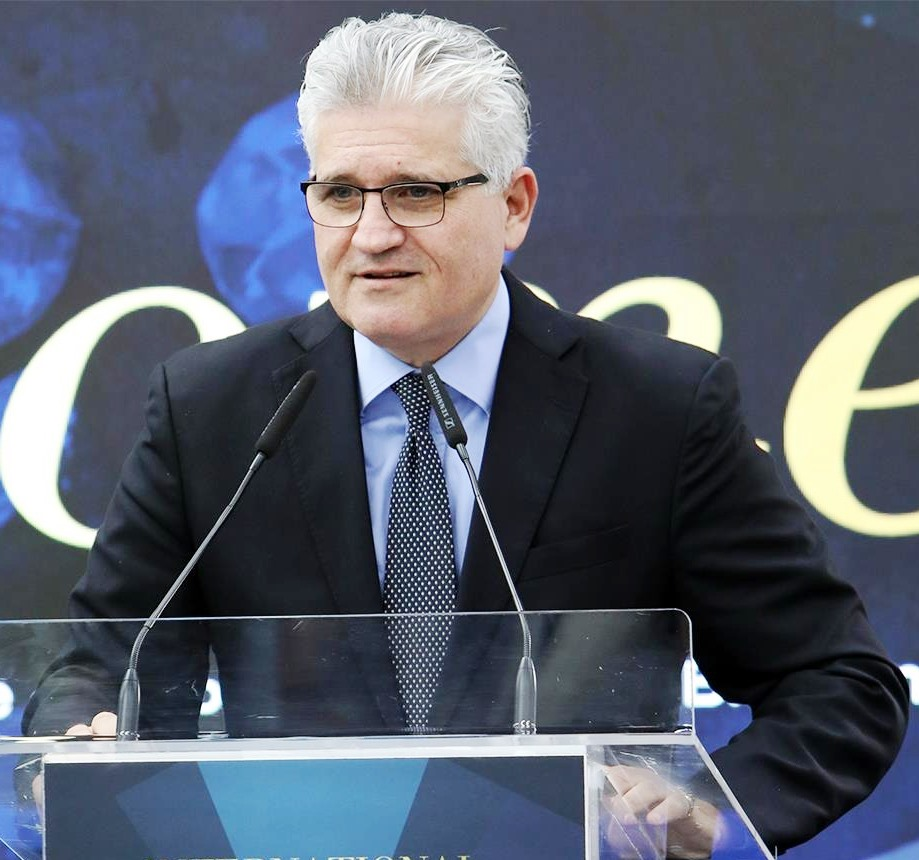

Ministerial roles
- 2021–2022: Minister in the Prime Minister's Office

Faction represented in the Knesset
- 2019–2021: Yisrael Beiteinu

Personal details
- Born: 3 December 1964 (age 61) Alexandria, United Arab Republic

Eli Avidar (Hebrew: אֵלִי אֲבִידָר; born 3 December 1964) is a former Israeli politician who founded the Israel Free political party in 2022. Prior to this, he was a member of the Knesset for Yisrael Beiteinu and served as Minister in the Prime Minister's Office from 2021 to 2022.

Before being elected to the Knesset in 2019, Avidar was the president of the fintech start-up Dindex Ltd. and Vice President of the World Jewellery Confederation. He is former managing director of the Israel Diamond Institute Group of Companies, the Israel Diamond Exchange, as well as a former senior diplomat in the Israeli Foreign Ministry.

== Biography ==
=== Early life and education ===
Avidar was born as Eli Aboudara in Alexandria, Egypt, in 1964, to Sephardic Jewish parents Isaac and Fortuna Aboudara. His father was deputy mayor of Bat Yam from 1973–1977. His ancestors, originally from Greece, moved to Egypt at the end of the 19th century. His family immigrated to Israel in 1967, immediately after the Six-Day War.

In 1982, Avidar enlisted in the Israel Defense Forces, and served in the Nachal Unit. Later, he graduated from the Intelligence Corps Officer Training School. He served as a case officer in a special unit, with the rank of Captain (Res). Today, he holds the rank of Major (Res).

After completing his army service in 1989, he graduated from the Hebrew University in Jerusalem with a B.A. in Middle East and General Studies. He completed his M.A. degree in 2009 in Middle Eastern Studies at the Tel Aviv University.

=== Diplomatic activities ===
In 1992, after his B.A. studies, he was accepted to the Foreign Ministry Cadet Training Course, and, a year later, he was appointed as Vice-Consul in Philadelphia, United States, where he served for three years. His main duties included working with opinion-makers in the Jewish community and American elected politicians in the five states covered by the consulate.

From 1996 to 1998, Avidar was responsible for the Foreign Ministry department dealing with Inter-Religious affairs, specifically regarding Islamic relations. In 1998, Avidar was appointed as foreign policy advisor to the director-general of the Foreign Ministry. In 1999, he was appointed as foreign policy advisor to the minister of foreign affairs, Ariel Sharon. During this period, he held the position of chairman of the "Third Track" peace negotiation committee with the Palestinians.

In 1999, Avidar was sent to the Emirate of Qatar as the Head of the Israeli Delegation, a position he held until 2001. He operated a trade office which served as a de facto embassy, but did not fly the Israeli flag. After the eruption of the second Intifada in 2000, Qatar was the only of several Arab states to maintain diplomatic relations with Israel via this trade office, as opposed to Oman, Tunisia, and Morocco, which broke off their diplomatic relations with the country. As a mark of appreciation, the then-Foreign Minister, Prof. Shlomo Ben-Ami, appointed Avidar as Consul-General to Hong Kong and Macau.

From 2001–2005, while he was Consul-General in Hong Kong, Avidar devoted most of his efforts to promoting economic relations and increasing trade with Israel. The number of Israeli companies operating in Hong Kong during his stay had increased by nearly five times, and trade between Israel and Hong Kong between 2001-2004 had risen by 27%. In 2003, Avidar, along with the German consulate and the Jewish community of Hong Kong, objected to the use of Nazi iconography by Hong Kong businesses, attributing the incident to a lack of education about the Second World War.

In 2006, following his service in Hong Kong and Macau, Avidar was placed in charge of humanitarian and economic relations with the Palestinian Authority within the Israeli Ministry of Foreign Affairs.

During the Second Lebanon War, he volunteered to act as spokesman to the Arabic language media, and appeared a significant number of times on Al Jazeera, as well as other Arabic satellite channels. Immediately after the end of the Second Lebanon War, Avidar resigned from his position in the Foreign Ministry to take a period of leave.

=== Business activities ===
In October 2006, Avidar was appointed by the board of directors of the Israel Diamond Institute Group of Companies as its managing director. Among the companies under his responsibility and direct management are IDI, HODM, IDT, IDINY, and IDI Asia Pacific.

During his tenure as managing director, the institute worked with its counterparts to better enable those in the diamond industry to operate in China. The IDI hosted the World Diamond Congress in May 2007. In November of that year, the Institute also hosted the president of Liberia, Ellen Johnson Sirleaf, and a memorandum of understanding was signed between the Israeli and the Liberian diamond sectors. In 2008, Avidar visited Sierra Leone, at the invitation of the Sierra Leone government, and met President Dr Ernest Bai Koroma and Vice President Samuel Sam-Sumana and the Liberian minister for mines.

In May 2012, Avidar was elected president of the Israel-Africa Chamber of Commerce. The Israel-Africa Chamber of Commerce was established in June 1996 to provide Israeli companies interested in doing business in Africa with pertinent economic knowledge on the continent, allowing them to easily and successfully operate in a cultural, intellectual, and political arena which is different from their own.

In June 2014, Avidar was elected for the second term, unanimously.

In May 2015, Eli Avidar, managing director of the Israel Diamond Institute, was elected VP of Cibjo, the World Jewellery Confederation. Avidar was also elected as a member of the board of directors, a member of the executive committee, and a member of the President's Council of Cibjo.

In January 2016, Avidar was appointed managing director of the Israel Diamond Exchange, concurrent with his role as managing director of IDI.

In June 2016, Avidar completed his role as president of the Israel-Africa Chamber of Commerce, received the Medal of Honor of the Chamber, and was awarded the title "Honorary President".

Between June 2018 to January 2019, Eli Avidar was the president of the Israeli fintech start-up called Dindex Ltd., aiming to create the first financial market for diamonds. The company has a daughter company called Carats.io, registered in the UK.

=== Public activities ===
In 2008, Avidar founded – and is the chairman of – "The Smart Middle East Forum". The objectives of the forum are to encourage new and different policy initiatives and present the leaders and citizens of Israel with alternatives, which will reflect the necessity of creativity and the understanding of the cultural elements of this part of the world.

The basic principles of strategic dialogue of the Forum are:

- Israel must strive towards peaceful relationships with countries in its region, and, whenever this is impossible, keep the lines of communication open.
- In those countries which do not recognize Israel's right to exist, dialogue should be held with moderate groups.
- Israel's policy in the Middle East must be supported by an understanding of the motivation of the regional attitudes and the ability to recognize the cultural differences between the players in the local arena.
- People and leaders in the Middle East do not function on absolute values – "both" are natural phenomena.
- The concept of time in the Middle East can vary – temporary achievements do not negate long-term objectives.
- The processes of the development of ideas, concepts, and dialogue in the Middle East are basically evolutionary: While creativity and reconstruction are accepted with a positive attitude in western culture, in the Middle East, they are regarded as dishonorable and an erosion of heritage. This development must be evolutionary, not revolutionary.
- Initiative and proactive policy are crucial factors in the Middle East. Complacency and the absence of long-term planning are regarded in the Middle East as an irrevocable weakness.

In 2010, Avidar became Chairman of the Leadership Empowerment Society.

== Political career ==
Avidar was elected to the Knesset in the April 2019 elections. He was vocal in his opposition to Netanyahu. Upon the indictment of Netanyahu, Avidar stated that Netanyahu should face trial and attended anti-Netanyahu protests. Throughout the COVID pandemic, Avidar fought against virus-related regulations, including the tracking of citizens and vaccine mandates.

In June 2021, Avidar rejected an offer from Avigdor Lieberman to serve as minister in the Finance Ministry. He then declared his independence from the party. In August 2021, negotiations ensued between Avidar and Naftali Bennett, leading to his appointment as strategic planning minister. He was also slated for appointment to intelligence minister upon the expected departure of Elazar Stern from the position. Upon Avidar's appointment as minister, he resigned from the Knesset under the Norwegian Law. However, Stern's expected resignation from the post of intelligence minister never came, as he withdrew his candidacy for chairman of the Jewish Agency, blocking Avidar's proposed appointment to the position.

In February 2022, Avidar resigned his ministerial post, thereby returning to the Knesset and becoming the first minister to quit Bennett's government, citing ideological concerns. He expressed regret for not having resigned earlier when he had not been appointed intelligence minister. In May, he professed his continuing loyalty to Bennett's coalition. In August 2022, he parted ways with Yisrael Beiteinu and resigned as a member of the Knesset.

=== Israel Hofsheet ===
Avidar then formed the Israel Hofsheet (Hebrew: ישראל חופשית דמוקרטית, English: Free Democratic Israel) list for the November 2022 election. In announcing the formation of Israel Hofsheet, Avidar has emphasized its libertarian principles and pursuit of legislation aimed at preventing a candidate under indictment from holding the position of prime minister. This proposed legislation would have the effect of barring Netanyahu from the post of prime minister. The name of the party is currently under question, as an existing nonprofit organization in Israel, the Free Israel Movement, has held a similar name since 2009. They have stated that if Avidar attempts to go through with using the name, they will take legal action to prevent it.

Prior to the November 2022 election, Avidar attempted to form coalitions with other parties, including Tzeirim Boarim, founded by TikTok personality Hadar Muchtar, who rejected the alliance. Avidar also reached out to United Arab List, also known as Ra'am, headed by Mansour Abbas.

== Books ==
Avidar has written two books in Hebrew. The first one was a non-fiction called Hatehom (התהום: מה באמת מפריד בינינו לבין העולם הערבי), translated to English as The Abyss: Bridging the Divide between Israel and the Arab World (2015). Avidar relies on his personal experiences working for Israel's Foreign Ministry to analyze diplomatic failures between Israel and Arab states within the last six decades. Specifically, The Abyss analyzes the lack of Israeli understanding of cultural divides and calls for increased patience from Israeli and American diplomats.

The second book, Ictus (איקטוס) was published in Hebrew, in 2015. It is a historical novel about the Roman Empire in 200 AD. The novel focuses on the relationship between a Jewish slave, Yoir, and his Roman master, Yarenis.

== Personal life ==
Avidar is married to Ornit and has three children.
