= Abir Kara =

Israeli businessman and politician

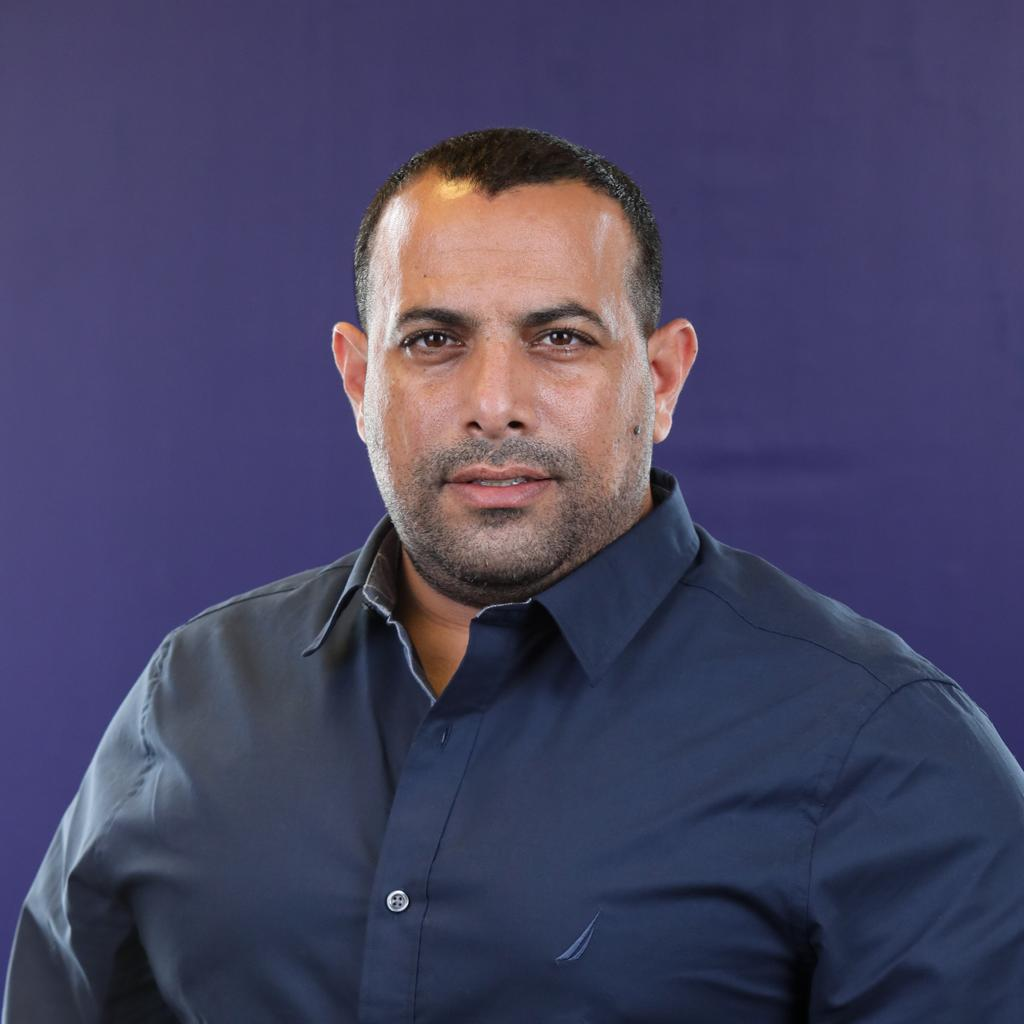
- Kara in 2021

Faction represented in the Knesset
- 2021–2022: Yamina
- 2022: Economic Freedom

Personal details
- Born: 27 October 1983 (age 42) Jerusalem, Israel

Avraham "Abir" Kara (Hebrew: אַבְרָהָם "אַבִּיר" קָארָה; born 27 October 1983) is an Israeli businessman and politician who served as a member of the Knesset from 2021 to 2022. Initially representing Yamina, he broke away to form the Economic Freedom Party in September 2022. His new party failed to win a seat in the November 2022 elections.

Since leaving the Knesset he has campaigned against what he describes as abusive class action litigation targeting small businesses.

== Business career ==
Kara used his bar mitzvah money to open a flower stall, later expanding the business to several branches. After completing his military service in the Israel Defense Forces he opened a horse ranch, and later ran franchises of a waffle bar and a pizza restaurant.

== Political activism ==
In 2019 Kara and another restaurant owner established 'I am Shulman' group to protest what they felt was government discrimination against self-employed workers. In less than a month its Facebook group had grown to 120,000 members.

After declining to join Likud, claiming that groups including the Histadrut union held too much power over the party, prior to the 2021 elections he joined Yamina and was placed seventh on its list. He was elected to the Knesset as the party won seven seats and was appointed Deputy Minister in the Prime Minister's Office. After Yamina joined the Zionist Spirit alliance, Kara announced that he would leave the party on 26 August 2022.

Kara launched a new party on 4 September 2022 called the Economic Freedom Party, a libertarian party that focuses on expanding personal and economic freedom. The party received just 0.33% of the vote in the 2022 elections, resulting in Kara losing his seat.

== Post-Knesset activism ==
Since leaving the Knesset, Kara has served as CEO of the Fund for the Self-Employed (Hebrew: הקרן למען העצמאיים). During the Iron Swords war, he raised hundreds of millions of shekels in donations for the home front and soldiers. In late December 2024, together with the short-term rental owners' association Eastra and attorneys Aner Bar Ilan and Rotem Darwish, he petitioned the Supreme Court against the Ministry of Defense over a roughly ₪750 million tender for vacation vouchers for reservists who had served at least 60 days in the war.

Kara led a public campaign against what he described as abuse of Israel's class action law by lawyers targeting small businesses. The campaign included demonstrations outside law offices, and in July 2024 a government bill restricting class actions against small businesses passed its first reading in the Knesset; Justice Minister Yariv Levin thanked Kara for his contribution to advancing the bill. Disability rights organisations criticised the initiative, arguing it would weaken accessibility requirements for businesses.

In September 2024 Kara was questioned by police on suspicion of violating a restraining order; he claimed the questioning was retaliation for his campaign against a "cartel" of lawyers, a claim police rejected.

== Controversy ==
In 2006 Kara was sentenced to 240 hours of community service for swearing at a police officer when he was caught putting up illegal election signs. He also admitted to uprooting olive trees owned by Palestinians.
