= Derekh Eretz (political party) =

Israeli political party

Derekh Eretz דרך ארץ
- Leader: Yoaz Hendel; Zvi Hauser
- Founded: 29 March 2020
- Split from: Telem; Blue and White
- Headquarters: Mana St. 11, Tel Aviv
- Ideology: Liberal Zionism; Liberal conservatism
- Political position: Centre-right
- National affiliation: New Hope (2021–2022)
- Colours: Blue
- Most MKs: 2

Website
- derech-eretz.org.il (archived)

Derekh Eretz (Hebrew: דרך ארץ, lit. 'The Way of the Land') was a centre-right political party in Israel formed in March 2020 by Members of Knesset Yoaz Hendel and Zvi Hauser following their split from the Telem faction. The group was active mainly during the 23rd and 24th Knessets and was later affiliated with the New Hope party.

== History ==
=== Background ===
In the March 2020 legislative election, Hendel and Hauser were elected to the Knesset on the Blue and White list. Blue and White received 1,220,381 votes and won 33 seats, according to the official results published by the Central Elections Committee. making them the second largest parliamentary group behind the right-wing Likud party.

=== Formation ===
Blue and White, and their leader, Benny Gantz, received the recommendations of a majority of Knesset members to form a government, after the party came in second. However, many in the alliance, including Hauser and Hendel, feared the formation of a minority government with the support of the Joint List. After receiving the recommendations, President Reuven Rivlin formally gave Gantz a mandate to form a government. To that end, Gantz began negotiations to form a unity government with incumbent Prime Minister Benjamin Netanyahu and his Likud party. In response to this development, Yesh Atid, a centrist party in Blue and White led by Yair Lapid, and Ya'alon's Telem party, applied to split their factions from Blue and White. Hauser and Hendel, who supported the alliance's entry into a unity government, applied to split themselves from the Telem party. On 29 March 2020, the House Committee approved the division of Hauser and Hendel from Telem, and the formation of their own faction—Derekh Eretz.

=== Alignment with New Hope ===
Ahead of the 2021 elections, Hendel and Hauser joined Gideon Sa'ar's New Hope party. Both served as Members of Knesset representing New Hope during the 24th Knesset, effectively integrating Derekh Eretz into that political framework.

On 8 December, both Hauser and Hendel announced they would join Gideon Sa'ar's recently formed New Hope. Neither were included when an alliance between Blue and White and New Hope was announced and they went on to join forces with Yamina in an alliance called Zionist Spirit that was announced on 27 July 2022. The alliance was ended in early September, when the two parties split up. Hendel and Hauser announced on 13 September that the party would not run in the 2022 election.

== Political position ==
Derekh Eretz was generally described by Israeli political analysts as a centre-right faction advocating liberal conservative positions, support for state institutions, and a pragmatic approach to governance and national security. Its positioning was discussed in the context of centre-right realignments in Israeli politics during the early 2020s.

== Leaders ==
Leader	Took office	Left office
Yoaz Hendel	2020	Present
Zvi Hauser	2020	Present

== Knesset members ==
Knesset term	Members	Total
2020–2021	2	Yoaz Hendel, Zvi Hauser
2021–2022	1	Zvi Hauser

== Election results ==
Election	Leader	Votes	%	Seats	+/−	Status
2020	Yoaz Hendel; Zvi Hauser	Part of Blue and White		2 / 120	–	Coalition government
2021	Yoaz Hendel; Zvi Hauser	Part of New Hope		1 / 120	▼1	Coalition government
