= New Economic Party =

Israeli political party

New Economic Party המפלגה הכלכלית החדשה
- Leader: Yaron Zelekha
- Spokesperson: Lior Gilboa
- Founded: 30 December 2020
- Ideology: Economic liberalism; Regulatory economics; Populism
- Political position: Centre-right
- National affiliation: NEP-Reservists (since 2026)
- Knesset: 0 / 120

Election symbol
- יז (2021-2022) די / دي (2026; NEP-Reservists)

Website
- www.hakalkalit.org

The New Economic Party (Hebrew: המפלגה הכלכלית החדשה; HaMiflagah HaKalkalit HaHadasha) is a socio-economic political party in Israel founded by the economist and former Israeli Ministry of Finance accountant general, Yaron Zelekha, in December 2020.

The party allied with The Reservists ahead of the 2026 Israeli legislative election, though it did not pass the 3.25% electoral threshold, winning 2.63% of the vote.

== History ==
In December 2020, Zelekha announced that he formed a new political party, which would be called the New Economic Party, based on an economic vision and planned to run as a candidate in the March 2021 national election in Israel.

In January 2021, ahead of the deadline to submit the party's electoral list, Zelekha announced his party's slate for the upcoming election, which included several professors, who were designated as the party's nominees for various cabinet positions.

Ahead of the 2026 election, the party decided to run together with The Reservists in an effort to pass the electoral threshold. Their platform focuses on the need to "fight tycoons and the cost of living" and supports "full universal service" for all Israelis. The alliance failed to pass the 3.25% electoral threshold with 2.63% of the vote.

== Platform ==
The party's platform includes policies related to taxation, housing, banking, transportation, education, healthcare, and defense.

=== Taxation ===
Ahead of the 2026 Israeli legislative election, the New Economic Party proposed reducing Israel's value-added tax (VAT) to 12% over six years, following an immediate reduction to 17%.

The platform also called for ending government support for monopolies, eliminating tax benefits for large companies, reducing property taxes for small businesses, lowering the top marginal income tax rate from 50% to 40% over five years, and reducing the corporate tax rate.

Additionally, the party's platform proposed to abolish all tariffs on food products and import quotas that it argued prevented smaller importers from competing with monopolies.

In another part of its platform, the party proposed changing the taxation of company cars by calculating taxable benefits according to a vehicle's depreciated value rather than its value when new, stating that the change would encourage the use of used vehicles and reduce incentives for frequent vehicle replacement.

=== Education ===
The party's plan to reform the education system centers on reducing class sizes by reducing teaching hours. The education section of the party's platform proposes reducing class sizes to 18 students per classroom.

The party also advocates reducing the Ministry of Education's bureaucracy, granting greater autonomy to school principals, increasing their salaries, and making it easier to remove underperforming school administrators.

In higher education, the party called for a review of funding and staffing allocations by the Council for Higher Education, with the aim of expanding academic programs in fields such as engineering, technology, and medicine.

The platform additionally proposed reforms to early childhood education, including the establishment of early childhood centers and subsidized daycare facilities. It also supported strengthening youth organizations, reforming technological education, and introducing differential funding to promote equal educational opportunities.

The party further proposed introducing mandatory financial education beginning in elementary school. The proposed curriculum would include budgeting, saving, consumer awareness, credit and debt management, investment fundamentals, taxation, pensions, and workers' rights.

== Leaders ==
Leader		Took office	Left office
1	Yaron Zelekha (1970-)	30 December 2020	Incumbent

== Election results ==
=== Knesset ===
Election	Leader	Votes	%	Seats	+/–	Government
2021	Yaron Zelekha	34,883	0.79	0 / 120	New	Extra-parliamentary
2022	Yaron Zelekha	13,920	0.29	0 / 120	0	Extra-parliamentary
2026	Yaron Zelekha	with The Reservists		0 / 120	0	Extra-parliamentary
