= Aron Shaviv =

Political strategist

Aron Shaviv (born 8 March 1979) is an international political strategist. He is the founder and chief executive officer of Vantage Influence, an international consulting firm that is based in Dubai. Shaviv served as the campaign manager of Benjamin Netanyahu’s 2015 election campaign and advised David Cameron in the 2015 UK general election as well as President Aleksandar Vučić in the 2017 Serbian presidential elections.

His clients have included the presidents and prime ministers of Thailand, Cambodia, Poland, Romania, Kenya, Bulgaria, Cyprus, Serbia, and the European Commission.

== Early life and career ==
Shaviv was born in 1979 in Oxford, UK and spent most of his childhood in Canada and Australia. He immigrated to Israel in 1996 where he enlisted in the Israel Defense Forces and rose to the rank of captain. After serving in the military for nine years, he worked for political consultant Arthur Finkelstein.

From October 2005 through May 2006, Shaviv served as a political advisor to the Yisrael Beiteinu party ahead of the general election in Israel that was held on May 28, 2006. He then founded the Shaviv Strategy and Campaigns consulting firm.

== Political projects ==
Shaviv is reported to have worked on presidential, parliamentary, and municipal campaigns in the US and UK as well as across Europe, Asia, and Africa.

In 2012, Shaviv served as campaign strategist for iVoteIsrael, an organization that encouraged American citizens living in Israel to register for and vote in the 2012 US presidential elections.

In 2015, as campaign manager to Israeli Prime Minister Benjamin Netanyahu, Shaviv formulated the winning strategy for the Likud party in the 2015 Israeli legislative elections. He also advised UK Prime Minister David Cameron in the UK general election that year.

In December 2015, Shaviv played a key role in lobbying the government of Slovakia to grant asylum to 149 Assyrian Christian refugees from Iraq.

In 2017, he advised the successful campaign of President Aleksandar Vučić in the Serbian presidential elections. Cambodian poll documents also showed that Shaviv advised Cambodian Prime Minister Hun Sen ahead of the 2018 Cambodian general elections.

In 2019, Shaviv Strategy and Campaigns advised the successful election campaign of President Zuzana Caputova in the 2019 Slovak presidential elections.

In 2021, Shaviv was named "the Consultant who pulled Dan Gertler out of sanctions purgatory"

In 2022, Shaviv successfully advised the presidential campaign of Serbian President Aleksandar Vučić, the presidential campaign of Colombian candidate Ingrid Betancourt and advised Israeli Prime Minister Naftali Bennett.

In 2024, Shaviv advised the presidential election campaign of Amadou Ba, Prime Minister of Senegal

== Controversies ==
In 2012, Shaviv served as campaign strategist for iVoteIsrael, an organization that encouraged American citizens living in Israel to register for and vote in the 2012 US presidential elections. The campaign was funded by a nonprofit called Americans for Jerusalem, a 501(c)(4) organization. Although the organization’s tax status required it to be nonpartisan, Shaviv admitted that its funders included the “Sheldon Adelsons of the world,” and reports linked it to Ronald Lauder as well. A subsequent audit by the Internal Revenue Service determined that iVoteIsrael did meet the non-partisan standards of a 501(c)(4) organization.

In 2016, Shaviv was hired by the Montenegrin Democratic Front party to serve as a consultant for the 2016 Montenegrin parliamentary elections. The election was shrouded by accusations by Montenegro’s chief special prosecutor of a coup attempt to assassinate the prime minister over his government’s attempt to join NATO. As part of the investigation into the plot, a group of 20 Serbian and Montenegrin citizens, including a former Serbian special police forces commander and pro-Russian rebel fighters in eastern Ukraine, were arrested on election day. While two Democratic Front leaders, Andrija Mandic and Milan Knezevic, were given sentences of up to five years, they denounced the verdicts and claimed along with all the opposition parties that the coup attempt was staged by the Montenegrin government as a publicity stunt to improve its electoral results. In 2025 Shaviv told his side of the story on the podcast Targeted.

In 2017, Shaviv was linked to a political survey conducted on behalf of the ruling party of Cambodia, CPP, ahead of the 2018 Cambodian general elections. The leaked findings from the survey were listed in emails that apparently showed correspondence between Cambodian Finance Minister Aun Porn Moniroth and Shaviv.

== Awards ==
In 2011, Shaviv received Campaigns and Elections Magazine's Rising Star award for his work for a Slovak candidate whom he helped achieve victory after polling 40 points behind the incumbent less than two months prior to the election.

In 2012, he won Campaigns and Elections Magazine's Best International Campaign Award.

In 2016, he won the International Consultant of the Year Award from the American Association of Political Consultants (AAPC). AAPC President Mark Mellman also awarded him a Pollie Award for the "Bibi-sitter" ad in Prime Minister Benjamin Netanyahu's 2015 campaign.
