= Israeli judicial reform =

There have been two recent attempts to reform the Judiciary of Israel. Both were legislation limiting judiciary independence.

- 2023 Israeli judicial reform
- 2025 Israeli judicial reform

== See also ==
- 2025 in Israel
- 2023 Israeli judicial reform protests
- Reactions to the 2023 Israeli judicial reform
- Itamar Ben-Gvir – an advocate of the proposal
- Daniel Blatman – a critic of the judicial reforms
