= Moshe =

Moshe is the Hebrew version of the masculine given name Moses, including of the Biblical figure Moses. Bearers of the name include:

- Moshe Arens (1925–2019), Israeli politician
- Moshe Bar (disambiguation)
- Moshe Basson (born 1950), Israeli chef
- Moshe Bejski (1921–2007), Israeli judge
- Moshe Brener (born 1971), Israeli basketball player
- Moshe Czerniak (1910–1984), Israeli chess master
- Moshe Dayan (1915–1981), Israeli military leader and politician
- Moshe Erem (1896–1978), Israeli politician
- Moshe Feinstein (1895–1986), Russian-born American Orthodox Jewish rabbi, scholar, and posek
- Moshe Gil (1921–2014), Israeli historian
- Moshe Gutnick, Australian Orthodox Chabad rabbi
- Moshe Hauer (1965-2025), American Orthodox rabbi
- Moshe Hirsch (1929–2010), Jewish activist and Palestinian politician
- Moshe Ivgy (born 1953), Israeli actor
- Moshe Jarden (born 1942), Israeli mathematician
- Moshe Kahlon (born 1960) Israeli politician
- Moshe Kasher (born 1979), American comedian
- Moshe Katsav (born 1945), Israeli-Iranian president of Israel
- Moshe Katz (disambiguation)
- Moshe Kaveh (born 1943), Israeli physicist and former president of Bar-Ilan University
- Moshe Kotlarsky (1949-2024), American Hasidic rabbi and spokesman
- Moshe Landau (1912–2011), Israeli judge
- Moshe Lazar (1928–2012), professor of comparative literature and drama
- Moshe Levy (disambiguation)
- Moshe Lobel, American actor
- Moshe Chaim Luzzatto (1707–1746), Italian rabbi and poet, also known as Ramchal
- Moshe Many (1928–2015), Israeli urologist, President of Tel Aviv University and President of Ashkelon Academic College
- Moshe Meiselman (born 1942), American-born Orthodox rabbi and rosh yeshiva
- Moshe Menuhin (1893–1982), American Jewish writer and teacher of Hebrew
- Moshe Mizrahi (basketball) (born 1980), Israeli basketball player
- Moshe Peled (disambiguation)
- Moshe Peretz (born 1983), Israeli Mizrahi music pop singer-songwriter and composer
- Moshe Ponte (born 1956), Israeli Olympic judoka and President of the Israel Judo Association
- Moshe Prywes (1914–1998), Polish-Israeli physician, educator and first President of Ben-Gurion University of the Negev
- Moshe Romano (born 1946), Israeli footballer
- Moshe Rosenstain (1881–1941), Ashkenazi rabbi
- Moshe Safdie (born 1938), Israeli-Canadian architect
- Moshe Schweitzer (born 1954), Israeli former footballer
- Moshe Shahal (born 1934), Israeli former politician
- Moshe Sharett (1894–1965), Prime Minister of Israel
- Moshe Sharon (born 1937), Israeli historian of Islam
- Moshe Smoira (1888–1961), Israeli jurist and the first president of the Supreme Court of Israel
- Moshe Tamir (disambiguation)
- Moshe Taube (1927–2020), Polish cantor, academic and musician
- Moshe Teitelbaum (disambiguation)
- Moshe Vardi (born 1954), Israeli computer scientist and professor
- Moshe Wallach (1866–1957), German-Jewish physician, founder and director of Shaare Zedek Hospital
- Moshe Weinberg (1939–1972), Israeli Olympic wrestling coach killed in the Munich massacre
- Moshe Weinkrantz (born 1954), Israeli basketball coach
- Moshe Wilensky (1910–1997), Polish-born Israeli composer
- Moshe Ya'alon (born 1950), Israeli general and politician
- Moshe Yess (1945–2011), Canadian Orthodox Jewish musician, composer and entertainer
- Moshe Yosef (disambiguation)
- Moshe Zakai (1926–2015), Polish-born Israeli professor of electrical engineering
- Moshe Zar (1937–2025), Israeli religious Zionist, settlement leader and convicted terrorist
