= Opinion polling for the 2021 Israeli legislative election =

In the run up to the 2021 Israeli legislative election, various organisations carry out opinion polling to gauge voting intention in Israel during the term of the 23rd Knesset. This article lists the results of such polls.

The date range for these opinion polls is from the previous election, held on 2 March 2020, to the present day. Due to the political deadlock which resulted after the previous election, and the possibility of a fourth consecutive snap election, polling for the 2021 election started 10 days after the previous election. The election is scheduled on 23 March 2021. No polls may be published from the end of the Friday before the election (19 March in this case) until the polling stations close on election day at 22:00.

Polls are listed in reverse chronological order, showing the most recent first and using the dates when the survey fieldwork was done, as opposed to the date of publication. Where the fieldwork dates are unknown, the date of publication is given instead. The highest figure in each polling survey is displayed with its background shaded in the leading party's colour. If a tie ensues, this is applied to the highest figures. When a poll has no information on a certain party, that party is instead marked by a dash (–).

== Seat projections ==
This section displays voting intention estimates referring to the 2021 Knesset election. The figures listed are Knesset seat counts rather than percentages, unless otherwise stated.

=== Polling graph ===
This graph shows the polling trends from the 2 March 2020 Israeli legislative election. Scenario polls are not included here.

For parties not crossing the electoral threshold (currently 3.25%) in any given poll, the number of seats is calculated as a percentage of the 120 total seats. Labor-Meretz-Gesher and Labor-Meretz are shown as Labor before the splits; Yesh Atid-Telem is shown as Yesh Atid before the split.

Local regression of polls conducted

=== Polls ===
Poll results are listed in the table below. Parties that fall below the electoral threshold of 3.25% are denoted by the percentage of votes that they received (N%), rather than the number of seats they would have gotten.

61 seats are required for a majority in the Knesset.

Color key:

Exit poll

Date	Polling firm	Publisher	Likud	Yesh Atid	Blue & White	Joint List	Shas	UTJ	Yisrael Beiteinu	Meretz	Ra'am	Yamina	New Hope	Labor	Religious Zionist (Note: Religious Zionist list including Otzma Yehudit and Noam)	New Economic
23 Mar 21	Election results		30	17	8	6	9	7	7	6	4	7	6	7	6	(0.79%)
Pre-election seats			37	16	12	11	9	7	7	4	4	3	2	2	2	–
23 Mar 21	Camil Fuchs	Channel 13	32	16	8	8	8	7	8	7	0	7	5	7	7	0
23 Mar 21	Midgam/iPanel	Channel 12	30	18	7	9	9	6	7	7	0	7	6	8	7	0
23 Mar 21	Kantar	Kan 11	30	18	8	8	9	7	7	6	0	7	6	7	7	0
19 Mar 21	Election silence starting end of Friday before election day															
19 Mar 21	Camil Fuchs	Channel 13	30	18	4	8	8	7	6	4	4	10	10	6	5	(2.1%)
18–19 Mar 21	Midgam/iPanel	Channel 12	32	18	4	8	8	7	7	4	4	9	9	6	4	(1.3%)
18 Mar 21	Panels Politics	Maariv	30	19	5	8	8	6	8	4	4	10	8	5	5	–
17–18 Mar 21	Direct Polls	–	32	17	7	7	9	7	9	4	4	8	7	4	5	(1.3%)
17–18 Mar 21	Kantar	Kan 11	31	19	4	8	8	7	7	4	4	9	9	5	5	(1.4%)
17–18 Mar 21	Smith	Mako	31	19	4	8	8	7	7	4	4	9	9	5	5	(1.4%)
16–18 Mar 21	Maagar Mohot	Israel Hayom	29	18	4	10	9	7	8	5	(1.7%)	10	10	5	5	(1.1%)
16 Mar 21	Midgam/iPanel	Channel 12	30	18	4	8	8	7	7	4	4	10	10	6	4	(1.4%)
15 Mar 21	Panels Politics	103fm	28	20	4	8	7	7	7	4	4	11	10	5	5	(1.5%)
14 Mar 21	Camil Fuchs	Channel 13	28	20	4	8	6	7	7	4	4	11	9	6	6	(2.1%)
11 Mar 21	Maagar Mohot	Israel Hayom	30	18	5	9	8	7	7	4	(1.7%)	11	10	6	5	(2.2%)
11 Mar 21	Panels Politics	The Jerusalem Post/ Maariv	27	20	4 (3.9%)	8	8	7	8	4 (3.6%)	4 (3.5%)	11	10	5	4 (3.4%)	(1.1%)
11 Mar 21	Kantar	Kan 11	29	19	5	8	8	7	7	(2.8%)	4	12	11	6	4	(1.6%)
10 Mar 21	Midgam/iPanel	Channel 12	28	19	4 (3.55%)	9	8	7	7	4 (3.28%)	(3.1%)	13	11	6	4 (3.3%)	(2.1%)
9 Mar 21	Camil Fuchs	Channel 13	29	20	4	8	6	7	7	4	4	11	9	6	5	(1.7%)
8 Mar 21	Panels Politics	103fm	28	20	5	8	8	6	8	4	(2.6%)	12	11	6	4	(1.2%)
4 Mar 21	Midgam/iPanel	Channel 12	29	20	5	9	8	7	7	(3%)	(3%)	12	12	7	4	(1.9%)
4 Mar 21	Panels Politics	Maariv	27	20	4	8	8	7	9	4	(2.4%)	12	12	5	4	(1.2%)
4 Mar 21	Maagar Mohot	Israel Hayom	29	17	5	10	8	7	7	4	4	10	11	4	4	(1.7%)
4 Mar 21	Kantar	Kan 11	29	20	5	8	7	7	7	(3.0%)	4	11	12	6	4	(1.7%)
3 Mar 21	Direct Polls	–	29	18	6	8	8	7	9	(2.1%)	(2.9%)	13	11	6	5	(1.9%)
2 Mar 21	Camil Fuchs	Channel 13	27	19	4	8	7	7	7	4	4	11	11	6	5	(2.1%)
2 Mar 21	Maagar Mohot	Channel 20	29	18	5	10	8	7	7	4	(2.1%)	10	13	5	4	(0.5%)
2 Mar 21	Midgam/iPanel	Channel 12	28	19	5	9	8	6	7	(2.5%)	(2.8%)	12	14	7	5	(1.8%)
28 Feb 21	Panels Politics	103fm	28	19	4	9	8	7	7	4	(2.3%)	11	13	6	4	(1.9%)
25 Feb 21	Panels Politics	Maariv	29	17	5	9	8	7	7	4	(2.2%)	11	14	5	4	(1.6%)
25 Feb 21	Camil Fuchs	Channel 13	27	18	4	8	7	7	6	5	4	11	13	6	4	(1.7%)
23 Feb 21	Kantar	Kan 11	29	18	4	9	8	7	7	4	–	11	13	6	4	(2.2%)
23 Feb 21	Panels Politics	103fm	28	18	4	9	8	7	7	4	(2.0%)	12	13	6	4	(1.3%)
23 Feb 21	Midgam/iPanel	Channel 12	28	18	5	9	8	7	7	4	(2.0%)	11	13	6	4	(2.1%)
18 Feb 21	Panels Politics	Maariv	28	18	(2.5%)	9	8	7	8	5	(2.1%)	12	15	5	5	(1.9%)
16 Feb 21	Midgam/iPanel	Channel 12	29	18	4	9	8	7	7	4	(1.8%)	10	13	6	5	(1.9%)
15 Feb 21	Camil Fuchs	Channel 13	28	17	4	8	7	7	5	5	4	11	13	6	5	(1.8%)
14 Feb 21	Panels Politics	103fm	29	18	(2.2%)	9	8	7	7	4	(2.0%)	13	14	6	5	(2.2%)
11 Feb 21	Maagar Mohot	Israel Hayom	29	16	5	10	9	7	6	5	(1.8%)	10	13	5	5	(2%)
11 Feb 21	Panels Politics	Maariv	28	19	4	8	8	7	7	4	(1.1%)	12	13	6	4	(1.3%)
10 Feb 21	Midgam/iPanel	Channel 12	28	18	4	9	8	7	7	4	(0.9%)	11	13	6	5	(1.7%)
9 Feb 21	Kantar	Kan 11	29	18	4	9	8	7	6	(2.8%)	(1.9%)	13	14	7	5	(2.1%)
8 Feb 21	Maagar Mohot	Channel 20	31	18	5	10	8	7	6	4	(1.3%)	10	11	6	4	(1.6%)
7 Feb 21	Panels Politics	103fm	30	18	4	8	8	7	7	4	(0.9%)	11	14	5	4	(1.1%)
6–7 Feb 21	Direct Polls	–	31	14	4	7	8	7	9	(2.9%)	4	11	14	7	4	(1.1%)
5 Feb 21	Camil Fuchs	Channel 13	30	17	4	7	7	6	5	4	4	11	13	7	5	–
5 Feb 21	Midgam/iPanel	Channel 12	29	17	4	9	8	7	7	4	(1.7%)	11	14	6	4	(2.8%)
4 Feb 21	Panels Politics	Maariv	29	16	–	10	8	7	8	5	(0.9%)	11	16	6	4	(1.1%)
4 Feb 21	Deadline for submitting the lists of candidates															
4 Feb 21	Gesher announces a joint run with Likud															
4 Feb 21	The Israelis, Tnufa and The Jewish Home drop out of the race															

Date	Polling firm	Publisher	Likud	Yesh Atid	B&W	Joint List	Ta'al	Ra'am	Shas	UTJ	YB	Meretz	Yamina	Labor	New Hope	RZ	Otzma Yehudit -Noam	JH	Israelis	NEP
Pre-election seats			36	15	13	8	3	4	9	7	7	4	3	2	2	2	–	1	–	–
3 Feb 21	Panels Politics	103fm	29	17	(2%)	10			8	7	8	5	11	6	14	5		–	(1%)	(2%)
3 Feb 21	Religious Zionist Party announces a joint list with Noam-Otzma Yehudit																			
3 Feb 21	Ta'al rejoins the Joint List; Ra'am confirms independent run																			
2 Feb 21	Panels Politics	Walla!	31	18	(1.9%)	10 (Note: Ra'am and Ta'al as a part of the Joint List)			8	8	7	5	12	6	15	(2%)	(2.2%)	(0.4%)	(0.9%)	(0.8%)
2 Feb 21	Camil Fuchs	Channel 13	29	16	4	10			7	8	7	5	10	8	16	(2%)	(2%)	–	(0.9%)	(2.7%)
1 Feb 21	Panels Politics	103fm	32	19	(2.8%)	10			8	8	7	4	13	5	14	(2.2%)	(2.2%)	–	(1.6%)	(1.6%)
1 Feb 21	Telem drops out of the race																			
1 Feb 21	Maagar Mohot	Channel 20	31	17	4	11			8	8	7	4	12	4	14	(0.7%)	(0.8%)	–	(1.1%)	(2.0%)
31 Jan 21	Midgam/iPanel	Channel 12	30	17	4	9 (Note: Ta'al as a part of the Joint List)		(1.8%)	8	8	7	4	13	6	14	–	–	–	–	–
31 Jan 21	Noam and Otzma Yehudit announce a joint list																			
28 Jan 21	Ra'am and Ta'al officially split from the Joint List																			

Date	Polling firm	Publisher	Likud	Yesh Atid	Joint List	Blue & White	Shas	UTJ	YB	Yamina	Meretz	Labor	Telem	New Hope	RZ	JH	Gesher	OY	Israelis	Tnufa	NEP
Pre-election seats			36	15	15	13	9	7	7	3	3	3	3	2	2	1	1	–	–	–	–
28 Jan 21	Maagar Mohot	Israel Hayom	28	15	11	5	9	7	6	11	6	5	(0%)	13	(2%)	(1.2%)	–	(0.3%)	(0.6%)	(0.5%)	4
28 Jan 21	Panels Politics	Maariv	30	18	10	4	8	8	7	12	5	4	(0.4%)	14	(2.8%)	(0.2%)	–	(1.9%)	(2.6%)	–	(2.2%)
26 Jan 21	Midgam/iPanel	Channel 12	29	16	10	4	8	8	7	14	5	4	(0.3%)	15	(2.2%)	(0.3%)	(0%)	(2.1%)	(2.7%)	(0.4%)	(2.8%)
24 Jan 21	Panels Politics	103fm	31	16	10	4	7	7	7	11	5	(2.4%)	(0.2%)	14	4	–	(0.6%)	(1.8%)	4	(0.7%)	(2.6%)
24 Jan 21	Camil Fuchs	Channel 13	32	18	10	4	6	7	6	10	5	4	(0.4%)	14	(2.6%)	(0.3%)	–	–	4	(0.5%)	(2.8%)
24 Jan 21	Merav Michaeli is elected chairwoman of the Israeli Labor Party																				
21 Jan 21	Panels Politics	Maariv	31	16	10	4	8	8	7	11	5	(0.7%)	–	16	(2%)	–	–	(1.4%)	4	–	(2.1%)
20 Jan 21	Religious Zionist Party officially splits from Yamina																				
19 Jan 21	Hagit Moshe is elected chairwoman of The Jewish Home																				
19 Jan 21	Midgam/iPanel	Channel 12	30	14	10	5	8	8	7	13	6	(1.6%)	(0.4%)	15	(1.9%)	(0.6%)	(0.7%)	(0.5%)	4	(0.4%)	(2.4%)
18 Jan 21	Panels Politics	103fm	30	14	10	4	8	6	7	11	5	(0.7%)	(0.3%)	17	4	(0.4%)	(0.4%)	(2.6%)	4	(0.2%)	(2.3%)
14 Jan 21	Panels Politics	Maariv	32	14	11	5	8	8	7	12	6	(0.9%)	(0.4%)	17	(2.6%)	–	(0.5%)	(1.9%)	(2.5%)	(0.7%)	(1.9%)
14 Jan 21	Maagar Mohot	Channel 20	29	13	12	4	9	7	7	10	5	–	–	14	4	–	–	(0.4%)	6	–	(2.0%)
12 Jan 21	Midgam/iPanel	Channel 12	29	13	10	5	8	8	7	13	5	(1.1%)	(0.7%)	16	(2.5%)	(0.7%)	(0.1%)	(0.7%)	6	(0.3%)	(2.7%)
10 Jan 21	Panels Politics	103fm	27	13	10	4	8	7	7	14	4	–	–	17	4	–	–	–	5	–	–
10 Jan 21	Yesh Atid and Telem split																				

Date	Polling firm	Publisher	Likud	Yesh Atid -Telem	Joint List	Blue & White	Shas	UTJ	YB	Yamina	New Hope	Meretz	Labor	JH	Gesher	OY	Israelis	Tnufa	NEP
Pre-election seats			36	18	15	13	9	7	7	5	2	3	3	1	1	–	–	–	–
8 Jan 21	Camil Fuchs	Channel 13	31	16	10	4	7	7	6	13	16	5	(1.1%)	(1.2%)	(0.4%)	–	5	(0.9%)	(1.3%)
7 Jan 21	Smith	The Jerusalem Post	30	19	11	–	8	8	6	11	18	5	–	–	–	–	4	–	–
7 Jan 21	Panels Politics	Maariv	28	14	10	4	8	7	7	13	18	5	(1.9%)	(0.3%)	(0.3%)	(1.7%)	6	(1.3%)	(1.3%)
5 Jan 21	Midgam/iPanel	Channel 12	27	13	10	5	8	8	6	14	18	5	(1.5%)	(0.3%)	(0.1%)	–	6	(0.3%)	(2.8%)
5 Jan 21	Jewish Home leader, Rafi Peretz, announces his retirement from politics																		
4 Jan 21	Former Mossad head Danny Yatom announces his intention to form a new political party for retirees, later named the Israeli Veterans Party																		
31 Dec 20	Panels Politics	Maariv	29	14	11	(2.6%)	8	8	7	13	17	5	(1.1%)	–	–	–	8	(0.4%)	(2.6%)
30 Dec 20	Midgam/iPanel	Channel 12	28	13	11	4	8	8	6	12	17	5	(1.2%)	(0.4%)	(0%)	–	8	(0.8%)	–
30 Dec 20	Camil Fuchs	Channel 13	29	11	10	5	8	8	6	12	17	5	–	–	–	–	9	–	–
30 Dec 20	Kantar	Kan 11	28	13	11	4	8	7	5	14	18	4	–	–	–	–	8	–	–
30 Dec 20	Former accountant general Yaron Zelekha forms the New Economic Party																		
29 Dec 20	Panels Politics	103fm	26	12	12	4	8	7	8	13	17	5	–	–	–	–	8	–	—N/a
29 Dec 20	Tel Aviv Mayor Ron Huldai forms The Israelis																		
27 Dec 20	Midgam/iPanel	Channel 12	28	16	11	5	8	8	7	13	19	5	(1.5%)	(1%)	(0%)	–	—N/a	(1.3%)	—N/a
24 Dec 20	Panels Politics	Maariv	26	15	11	4	8	7	7	14	21	7	(1.4%)	(0.3%)	(0%)	(1%)	—N/a	(0.8%)	—N/a
24 Dec 20	MK Ofer Shelah leaves Yesh Atid with plans to start his own political party, later named Tnufa																		

Date	Polling firm	Publisher	Likud	Yesh Atid -Telem	Joint List	Blue & White	Shas	UTJ	Yisrael Beiteinu	Yamina	New Hope	Meretz	Labor	Jewish Home	Gesher	Otzma Yehudit
Pre-election seats			36	17	15	14	9	7	7	5	2	3	3	1	1	–
23 Dec 20	Panels Politics	103fm	25	15	11	4	8	7	7	15	22	6	(0.7%)	–	–	–
23 Dec 20	Likud Minister Ze'ev Elkin and MK Sharren Haskel join New Hope															
23 Dec 20	Minister Amir Peretz announces that he will not run for Labor Party leadership															
23 Dec 20	The 23rd Knesset is dispersed															
22 Dec 20	Panels Politics	103fm	28	15	11	5	8	8	7	14	18	6	–	–	–	–
22 Dec 20	Kantar	Kan 11	28	13	11	6	8	7	6	15	20	6	–	–	–	–
22 Dec 20	Midgam/iPanel	Channel 12	29	16	11	5	8	8	7	13	18	5	(1.7%)	(0.1%)	(0.2%)	–
22 Dec 20	Likud MK Michal Shir joins New Hope															
21 Dec 20	Panels Politics	Knesset Channel	29	13	11	6	8	7	7	14	20	5	–	–	–	–
20 Dec 20	Camil Fuchs	Channel 13	28	16	11	5	7	7	6	14	19	7	–	–	–	–
17 Dec 20	Panels Politics	Maariv	29	13	11	7	8	8	7	13	19	5	–	–	–	–
15–16 Dec 20	Maagar Mohot	103fm	27	14	11	7	8	8	8	11	20	6	–	–	–	–
15 Dec 20	Panels Politics	103fm	27	15	11	5	8	8	7	14	20	5	–	–	–	–
15 Dec 20	Midgam/iPanel	Channel 12	27	14	11	6	8	8	6	13	21	6	(2.1%)	(0.5%)	(0.4%)	–
15 Dec 20	Likud MK Yifat Shasha-Biton joins New Hope															
11 Dec 20	Maagar Mohot	Israel Hayom	28	12	13	7	9	7	6	12	20	6	(1.3%)	–	(0.1%)	(0.5%)
9–10 Dec 20	Panels Politics	Maariv	27	13	12	7	9	7	8	16	16	5	(1%)	(0.6%)	(0.7%)	(0.7%)
9 Dec 20	Kantar	Kan 11	25	15	11	7	8	7	6	17	18	6	–	–	–	–
9 Dec 20	Camil Fuchs	Channel 13	28	16	11	6	7	7	7	16	15	7	–	–	–	–
9 Dec 20	Midgam/iPanel	Channel 12	26	15	11	6	8	8	6	18	16	6	–	–	–	–
9 Dec 20	Derekh Eretz MKs Zvi Hauser and Yoaz Hendel join New Hope															
8–9 Dec 20	Direct Polls	–	28	13	11	6	10	8	8	16	16	4	–	–	–	–
8 Dec 20	Panels Politics	103fm	25	14	11	6	9	7	7	19	17	5	–	–	–	–
8 Dec 20	Likud MK Gideon Sa'ar forms New Hope															

Legend

- Gov.
  - — Sum of the 35th government parties: Likud, Blue & White, Shas, United Torah Judaism (UTJ), Labor (not including MK Merav Michaeli), Derekh Eretz, Jewish Home and Gesher.

Date	Polling firm	Publisher	Likud	Yesh Atid -Telem	Joint List	Blue & White	Shas	UTJ	Yisrael Beiteinu	Yamina	Meretz	Labor	Derekh Eretz	Jewish Home	Gesher	Otzma Yehudit	Gov.
Pre-election seats			36	17	15	14	9	7	7	5	3	3	2	1	1	–	72
3 Dec 20	Midgam/iPanel	Channel 12	30	17	12	10	8	8	7	21	7	–	–	–	–	–	56
2 Dec 20	Camil Fuchs	Channel 13	29	19	11	10	7	7	8	22	7	–	–	–	–	–	53
1 Dec 20	Panels Politics	103fm	29	18	12	10	8	7	8	23	5	–	–	–	–	–	54
27 Nov 20	Midgam/iPanel	Channel 12	30	18	13	9	8	8	8	20	6	–	–	–	–	–	55
27 Nov 20	Panels Politics	Maariv	29	19	11	9	8	7	8	23	6	–	–	–	–	–	53
25–26 Nov 20	Maagar Mohot	103fm	30	17	13	9	9	8	7	22	5	–	–	–	–	–	56
24 Nov 20	Kantar	Kan 11	31	17	11	9	9	7	9	21	6	(1.7%)	–	(1.1%)	–	(1.2%)	56
24 Nov 20	Camil Fuchs	Channel 13	27	20	11	10	7	7	8	23	6	–	–	–	–	–	51
19 Nov 20	Panels Politics	Maariv	27	18	11	10	9	7	8	24	6	(0.8%)	(0.5%)	(0.3%)	(0.2%)	(1.5%)	53
17 Nov 20	Camil Fuchs	Channel 13	29	20	11	10	8	6	7	22	7	–	–	–	–	–	53
16 Nov 20	Geocartographia	i24 News	28	15	12	12	9	8	5	25	6	–	–	–	–	–	57
13 Nov 20	Panels Politics	Maariv	30	17	11	9	9	8	8	23	5	–	–	–	–	–	56
11–12 Nov 20	Maagar Mohot	103fm	29	16	15	9	9	8	8	21	5	–	–	–	–	–	55
10 Nov 20	Direct Polls	–	30	18	13	9	8	8	9	20	5	(1.5%)	(1.6%)	–	(0.2%)	(0.3%)	55
7 Nov 20	Midgam/iPanel	Channel 12	28	17	13	11	8	8	7	22	6	(1.8%)	(0.6%)	(0.4%)	(0.2%)	–	55
2 Nov 20	Panels Politics	103fm	29	19	12	9	8	7	8	22	6	–	–	–	–	–	53
1 Nov 20	Camil Fuchs	Channel 13	29	20	12	10	7	7	7	22	6	–	–	–	–	–	53
28–29 Oct 20	Maagar Mohot	103fm	28	17	14	10	9	8	8	20	6	–	–	–	–	–	55
28 Oct 20	Panels Politics	Maariv	28	17	12	10	9	8	9	21	6	(2%)	(0.5%)	(0.5%)	(0.3%)	(1.3%)	55
21–22 Oct 20	Panels Politics	Maariv	30	18	12	9	9	7	8	20	7	(1%)	(0.2%)	(0.5%)	(0.2%)	(1.6%)	55
18 Oct 20	Camil Fuchs	Channel 13	27	21	11	8	8	7	8	24	6	–	–	–	–	–	50
18 Oct 20	Midgam/iPanel	Channel 12	27	17	15	10	9	7	7	22	6	(2%)	(0.5%)	(0.6%)	(0.3%)	–	53
14–15 Oct 20	Maagar Mohot	103fm	28	15	16	9	9	9	7	21	6	–	–	–	–	–	55
11–12 Oct 20	Panels Politics	Maariv	28	17	14	9	9	7	9	21	6	–	–	–	–	–	53
8 Oct 20	Panels Politics	Maariv	27	16	15	10	9	7	9	22	5	(1%)	(0.5%)	(0.5%)	(0%)	(1.5%)	53
7 Oct 20	Maagar Mohot	Channel 20	28	15	16	9	9	9	7	21	6	–	–	–	–	–	55
6 Oct 20	Direct Polls	Ice	31	18	13	7	9	7	9	20	6	(0.7%)	(2.5%)	(0.3%)	(0.2%)	(0.6%)	54
6 Oct 20	Midgam/iPanel	Channel 12	26	18	15	9	9	7	8	23	5	(2%)	(0.1%)	(0.8%)	(0.5%)	–	51
23 Sep 20	Midgam/iPanel	Channel 12	29	17	15	9	9	7	8	21	5	(1.8%)	(0.6%)	(0.6%)	(0.5%)	–	54
16 Sep 20	Direct Polls	Arutz Sheva	30	17	14	8	9	7	9	20	6	(1.1%)	(1%)	(0.4%)	(0.3%)	(0.3%)	52
16 Sep 20	Camil Fuchs	Channel 13	30	18	12	8	7	7	8	22	8	–	–	–	–	–	52
11–12 Sep 20	Panels Politics	103fm	30	16	15	8	9	7	8	21	6	–	–	–	–	–	54
11 Sep 20	Maagar Mohot	Israel Hayom	31	13	17	10	9	7	8	20	5	–	–	–	–	–	57
7 Sep 20	Camil Fuchs	Channel 13	31	18	13	11	7	7	6	21	6	–	–	–	–	–	56
4 Sep 20	Midgam/iPanel	Channel 12	31	15	15	11	8	7	8	19	6	–	–	–	–	–	57
27 Aug 20	Panels Politics	Maariv	28	20	14	10	8	7	9	17	7	(1.9%)	(0.2%)	(0.7%)	(0.4%)	(1.2%)	53
23 Aug 20	Camil Fuchs	Channel 13	31	19	13	11	7	7	8	18	6	–	(0%)	(0%)	(0%)	–	56
21 Aug 20	Maagar Mohot	103fm	32	19	15	10	8	8	8	15	5	–	–	–	–	–	58
20 Aug 20	Direct Polls	Israel Hayom	31	19	14	8	10	7	9	16	6	–	–	–	–	–	56
19 Aug 20	Panels Politics	Maariv	29	20	14	9	8	7	9	19	5	(2.1%)	(0.2%)	(0.2%)	(0.3%)	(1.9%)	53
16 Aug 20	Camil Fuchs	Channel 13	33	20	12	10	7	6	7	19	6	–	–	–	–	–	56
16 Aug 20	Midgam	Channel 12	30	16	15	12	7	8	8	18	6	(1.8%)	(0.5%)	(0.2%)	(0.2%)	–	57
13 Aug 20	Panels Politics	Maariv	27	20	15	9	8	7	9	18	7	–	–	–	–	–	51
12 Aug 20	Direct Polls	Makor Rishon	32	18	15	10	9	8	9	14	5	–	–	–	–	–	59
10 Aug 20	Geocartographia	Maariv	29	19	14	13	7	9	7	14	8	–	–	–	–	–	58
6–7 Aug 20	Midgam	Channel 12	31	18	15	11	8	8	7	16	6	(1.9%)	(0.6%)	(0.4%)	(0%)	–	58
6 Aug 20	Camil Fuchs	Channel 13	29	19	15	8	8	7	8	19	7	–	–	–	–	–	52
6 Aug 20	Kantar	Kan 11	30	17	16	12	9	8	7	15	6	(1.1%)	(1.2%)	(0.9%)	(0.1%)	(1%)	59
5–6 Aug 20	Maagar Mohot	103fm	32	18	16	11	10	8	8	12	5	–	–	–	–	–	61
4 Aug 20	Direct Polls	Srugim	35	18	16	9	10	7	8	12	5	–	–	–	–	–	61
30 Jul 20	Maagar Mohot	Israel Hayom	33	17	16	12	9	8	8	12	5	–	–	–	–	–	62
28 Jul 20	Panels Politics	103fm	31	19	16	10	9	7	8	13	7	–	–	–	–	–	57
23 Jul 20	Camil Fuchs	Channel 13	31	19	15	11	6	7	8	16	7	–	–	–	–	–	55
23 Jul 20	Midgam	Channel 12	32	18	15	9	8	8	7	15	8	(1.8%)	(0.3%)	(0%)	(0.2%)	–	57
22–23 Jul 20	Panels Politics	Maariv	32	18	15	9	10	8	9	12	7	(1.2%)	(0.5%)	(0.8%)	–	(1.8%)	59
22–23 Jul 20	Maagar Mohot	103fm	35	17	15	12	9	8	8	11	5	–	–	–	–	–	64
22 Jul 20	Direct Polls	–	35	18	16	12	9	7	8	11	4	–	–	–	–	–	63
14 Jul 20	Panels Politics	103fm	34	16	15	9	9	7	9	14	7	–	–	–	–	–	59
14 Jul 20	The Jewish Home splits from Yamina																
12 Jul 20	Camil Fuchs	Channel 13	33	19	16	9	7	8	8	13	7	–	–	–	–	–	57
9 Jul 20	Panels Politics	Maariv	36	16	15	10	9	7	9	12	6	–	–	–	–	–	62
8 Jul 20	Direct Polls	–	36	17	16	9	10	7	8	11	6	(1.7%)	(2.4%)	(0.5%)	(0.6%)	(0.6%)	62
6 Jul 20	Midgam	Channel 12	37	15	15	11	9	7	8	11	7	(2.1%)	(0.4%)	(0.9%)	(0.2%)	–	64
3 Jul 20	Maagar Mohot	103fm	38	17	15	10	9	8	8	9	6	–	–	–	–	–	65
28 Jun 20	Camil Fuchs	Channel 13	38	16	16	9	8	7	8	11	7	–	–	–	–	–	62
17 Jun 20	Direct Polls	–	41	15	16	11	10	7	8	7	5	(1.1%)	(1.6%)	(0%)	(0.2%)	(0.5%)	69
17 Jun 20	Smith	The Jerusalem Post	41	15	16	10	9	7	8	8	6	(2.3%)	(1.5%)	(0%)	(0.2%)	(1.4%)	67
10–11 Jun 20	Maagar Mohot	103fm	41	16	15	13	9	8	7	6	5	–	–	–	–	–	71
8 Jun 20	Midgam	Channel 12	40	14	15	12	9	7	9	8	6	(1.9%)	(0.4%)	(0.4%)	(0.5%)	–	68
26 May 20	Panels Politics	103fm	41	14	15	12	9	8	6	9	6	(1.5%)	–	–	(0.9%)	(1.3%)	70
17 May 20	New government is formed																
14 May 20	The Jewish Home unofficially splits from Yamina																

Date	Polling firm	Publisher	Likud	Yesh Atid -Telem	Blue & White	Joint List	Shas	UTJ	Yisrael Beiteinu	Yamina	Labor	Meretz	Derekh Eretz	Gesher	Otzma Yehudit
Pre-election seats			36	16	15	15	9	7	7	6	3	3	2	1	–
30 Apr 20	Direct Polls	–	41	11	16 (Note: Merger of Blue and White and Labor.)	15	9	8	8	7		5	(2%)	(1.8%)	(0.8%)
22-23 Apr 20	Smith	–	41	11	17	16	10	7	6	7		5	(0.4%)	(0.4%)	(0.4%)
13 Apr 20	Midgam	Channel 12	40	10	19	15	9	7	7	8	(1.1%)	5	(1.4%)	(1.4%)	(1.9%)
12 Apr 20	Direct Polls	–	38	14	16	15	9	8	8	7		5	(2.85%)	(0.93%)	(0.60%)
7 Apr 20	Smith	The Jerusalem Post	42	9	18	16	8	7	6	7	(2.2%)	7	(0.3%)	(0.9%)	(0.9%)
6 Apr 20	Labor splits from Meretz														
29-30 Mar 20	Smith	–	40	11	15 (Note: Merger of Blue and White and Derekh Eretz.)	16	9	7	6	7	9			–	–
29 Mar 20	Israel Resilience Party and Derekh Eretz split from Yesh Atid and Telem, and keep the name Blue and White														
27 Mar 20	Direct Polls	Arutz Sheva	38	16	15	15	8	7	6	7	8			(1.3%)	(0.65%)
26 Mar 20	Yesh Atid and Telem unofficially split from Blue and White														
23 Mar 20	Gesher splits from Labor and Meretz														

Legend

- Gov.
  - — Sum of the 34th government parties: Likud, Shas, United Torah Judaism (UTJ), and Yamina.

61 seats are required for a majority in the Knesset.

Note: The composition of the current government does not necessarily determine the exact makeup of the post-election government.

Date	Polling firm	Publisher	Likud	Blue & White	Joint List	Shas	UTJ	Labor- Meretz	Gesher	Yisrael Beiteinu	Yamina	Otzma Yehudit	Gov.
19 Mar 20	Direct Polls	–	40	30	15	8	7	6	(0.41%)	7	7	(0.30%)	62
14–16 Mar 20	Direct Polls	–	39	30	16	8	8	7	(1.75%)	6	6	(0.34%)	61
12 Mar 20	Midgam	Channel 12	37	33	15	9	7	6		7	6	(0.7%)	59
10 Mar 20	Gesher unofficially splits from Labor and Meretz												
2 Mar 20	Election results		36	33	15	9	7	7		7	6	(0.42%)	58

== Scenario polls ==
Most often, opinion polling about hypothetical scenarios is done in the same survey as for the regular polling. This is why these scenario polls are paired for comparison purposes.

Regular poll
Scenario poll

Labor, The Israelis & Tnufa merger

Date	Polling firm	Publisher	Likud	Yesh Atid	Joint List	B&W	Shas	UTJ	YB	Meretz	Yamina	New Hope	Labor+ Israelis+ Tnufa
Pre-election seats			36	15	15	13	9	7	7	4	3	2	2
2 Feb 21	Camil Fuchs	Channel 13	29	16	10	4	7	8	7	5	10	16	8
2 Feb 21	Camil Fuchs	Channel 13	29	15	10	4	7	8	6	4	11	15	11

Religious Zionist Party, The Jewish Home & Otzma Yehudit merger and Ra'am split from the Joint List

Date	Polling firm	Publisher	Likud	Yesh Atid	B&W	Joint List	Ra'am	Shas	UTJ	YB	Meretz	Yamina	RZ+ JH+ OY	NH	Labor
Pre-election seats			36	15	13	11	4	9	7	7	4	3	3	2	2
2 Feb 21	Camil Fuchs	Channel 13	29	16	4	10		7	8	7	5	10	(4%)	16	8
2 Feb 21	Camil Fuchs	Channel 13	27	15	4	8	4	7	8	7	5	8	6	14	7

Religious Zionist Party, Otzma Yehudit & Noam merger and Joint List reunification

Date	Polling firm	Publisher	Likud	Yesh Atid	Joint List	Shas	UTJ	YB	Meretz	Yamina	New Hope	Labor	RZ +Otzma +Noam
Pre-election seats			36	15	15	9	7	7	4	3	2	2	2
1 Feb 21	Panels Politics	103fm	32	19	10	8	8	7	4	13	14	5	(4.4%)
1 Feb 21	Panels Politics	103fm	30	18	10	8	8	7	4	12	13	5	5

Labor & Israelis merger and Joint List reunification

Date	Polling firm	Publisher	Likud	Yesh Atid	Joint List	Blue & White	Shas	UTJ	YB	Meretz	Yamina	New Hope	Labor+ Israelis
Pre-election seats			36	15	15	13	9	7	7	4	3	2	2
1 Feb 21	Panels Politics	103fm	32	19	10	(2.8%)	8	8	7	4	13	14	5
1 Feb 21	Panels Politics	103fm	32	18	10	–	8	8	7	4	13	13	7
31 Jan 21	Midgam/iPanel	Channel 12	30	17	9	4	8	8	7	4	13	14	6
31 Jan 21	Midgam/iPanel	Channel 12	30	16	10	4	8	8	6	4	13	14	7

Religious Zionist Party & The Jewish Home merger and Joint List reunification

Date	Polling firm	Publisher	Likud	Yesh Atid	Joint List	Blue & White	Shas	UTJ	YB	Meretz	Yamina	RZ +JH	Telem	New Hope	Labor	Gesher	OY+N	Israelis	Tnufa	NEP
Pre-election seats			36	15	15	13	9	7	7	4	3	3	3	2	2	1	–	–	–	–
31 Jan 21	Midgam/iPanel	Channel 12	30	17	9	4	8	8	7	4	13	–	–	14	6	–	–	–	–	–
31 Jan 21	Midgam/iPanel	Channel 12	30	17	10	4	8	8	7	4	13	(2.1%)	(0.2%)	14	5	(0.2%)	(1.2%)	(1.2%)	(0.3%)	(2.9%)

Labor, The Israelis, Tnufa, New Economic Party & Telem merger

Date	Polling firm	Publisher	Likud	Yesh Atid	Joint List	Blue & White	Shas	UTJ	YB	Labor +Israelis +Tnufa +NEP +Telem	Yamina	Meretz	New Hope
Pre-election seats			36	15	15	13	9	7	7	6	3	3	2
28 Jan 21	Maagar Mohot	Israel Hayom	28	15	11	5	9	7	6	9	11	6	13
28 Jan 21	Maagar Mohot	Israel Hayom	28	14	10	4	9	7	6	13	12	5	12

Yesh Atid & The Israelis merger

Date	Polling firm	Publisher	Likud	Yesh Atid +Israelis	Joint List	B&W	Shas	UTJ	YB	Yamina	Meretz	Labor	New Hope	NEP
Pre-election seats			36	15	15	13	9	7	7	3	3	3	2	–
28 Jan 21	Maagar Mohot	Israel Hayom	28	15	11	5	9	7	6	11	6	5	13	4
28 Jan 21	Maagar Mohot	Israel Hayom	27	19	10	4	8	7	7	10	8	5	11	4
26 Jan 21	Midgam/iPanel	Channel 12	29	16	10	4	8	8	7	14	5	4	15	(2.8%)
26 Jan 21	Midgam/iPanel	Channel 12	29	18	10	4	8	8	6	14	4	4	15	–
24 Jan 21	Camil Fuchs	Channel 13	32	22	10	4	6	7	6	10	5	4	14	(2.8%)
24 Jan 21	Camil Fuchs	Channel 13	32	24	9	5	7	7	6	11	5	–	14	–

Yamina-New Hope merger

Date	Polling firm	Publisher	Likud	Yesh Atid	Joint List	Blue & White	Shas	UTJ	Yisrael Beiteinu	Meretz	Labor	Yamina	New Hope	Israelis	NEP
Pre-election seats			36	15	15	13	9	7	7	3	3	3	2	–	–
28 Jan 21	Maagar Mohot	Israel Hayom	28	15	11	5	9	7	6	6	5	11	13	(0.6%)	4
28 Jan 21	Maagar Mohot	Israel Hayom	27	15	10	4	9	7	7	6	5	25		–	5
12 Jan 21	Midgam/iPanel	Channel 12	29	13	10	5	8	8	7	5	(1.1%)	13	16	6	(2.7%)
12 Jan 21	Midgam/iPanel	Channel 12	30	15	10	5	8	8	7	6	–	25		6	–

Date	Polling firm	Publisher	Likud	Yesh Atid -Telem	Joint List	Blue & White	Shas	UTJ	Yisrael Beiteinu	Yamina	New Hope	Meretz
Pre-election seats			36	17	15	14	9	7	7	5	2	3
9 Dec 20	Midgam/iPanel	Channel 12	26	15	11	6	8	8	6	18	16	6
9 Dec 20	Midgam/iPanel	Channel 12	26	15	11	7	8	8	6	32		7

Religious Zionist Party, The Jewish Home & Otzma Yehudit merger

Date	Polling firm	Publisher	Likud	Yesh Atid	Joint List	B&W	Shas	UTJ	YB	Yamina	Meretz	Labor	RZ+ JH+ OY	New Hope
Pre-election seats			36	15	15	13	9	7	7	3	3	3	3	2
26 Jan 21	Midgam/iPanel	Channel 12	29	16	10	4	8	8	7	14	5	4	(4.6%)	15
26 Jan 21	Midgam/iPanel	Channel 12	27	16	10	4	8	8	7	12	5	4	5	14

The Israelis & Labor merger

Date	Polling firm	Publisher	Likud	Yesh Atid	Joint List	B&W	Shas	UTJ	YB	Yamina	Meretz	Israelis +Labor	New Hope	RZ
Pre-election seats			36	15	15	13	9	7	7	3	3	3	2	2
26 Jan 21	Midgam/iPanel	Channel 12	29	16	10	4	8	8	7	14	5	4	15	(2.2%)
26 Jan 21	Midgam/iPanel	Channel 12	29	14	10	4	8	8	7	14	4	7	15	–
24 Jan 21	Panels Politics	103fm	31	16	10	4	7	7	7	11	5	4	14	4
24 Jan 21	Panels Politics	103fm	31	15	10	4	7	7	7	11	4	7	13	4

Tzipi Livni joining Yesh Atid and The Israelis, Labor, Telem & Tnufa merger

Date	Polling firm	Publisher	Likud	Yesh Atid	Joint List	B&W	Shas	UTJ	YB	Israelis +Labor +Telem +Tnufa	Yamina	Meretz	New Hope
Pre-election seats			36	15	15	13	9	7	7	6	3	3	2
24 Jan 21	Camil Fuchs	Channel 13	32	18	10	4	6	7	6	8	10	5	14
24 Jan 21	Camil Fuchs	Channel 13	31	22	9	4	6	7	5	9	9	4	14

Religious Zionist Party & Otzma Yehudit merger

Date	Polling firm	Publisher	Likud	Yesh Atid	Joint List	B&W	Shas	UTJ	YB	Yamina	Meretz	New Hope	RZ +OY	Israelis
Pre-election seats			36	15	15	13	9	7	7	3	3	2	2	–
19 Jan 21	Midgam/iPanel	Channel 12	30	14	10	5	8	8	7	13	6	15	(2.4%)	4
19 Jan 21	Midgam/iPanel	Channel 12	29	14	10	5	8	8	7	11	6	14	4	4

Labor with The Israelis, Yesh Atid, Blue & White, New Economic Party and Tnufa

Date	Polling firm	Publisher	Likud	Yesh Atid +Labor +Israelis +Tnufa +NEP +B&W	Joint List	Shas	UTJ	Yisrael Beiteinu	Yamina	Meretz	New Hope
Pre-election seats			36	31	15	9	7	7	3	3	2
19 Jan 21	Midgam/iPanel	Channel 12	30	23	10	8	8	7	13	6	15
19 Jan 21	Midgam/iPanel	Channel 12	30	27	10	8	8	7	12	5	13
12 Jan 21	Midgam/iPanel	Channel 12	29	24	10	8	8	7	13	5	16
12 Jan 21	Midgam/iPanel	Channel 12	30	28	10	8	8	7	12	4	13

Ehud Barak leading Labor

Date	Polling firm	Publisher	Likud	Yesh Atid -Telem	Joint List	Blue & White	Shas	UTJ	Yisrael Beiteinu	Yamina	New Hope	Meretz	Labor	Israelis
Pre-election seats			36	16	15	15	9	7	7	5	2	3	3	–
8 Jan 21	Camil Fuchs	Channel 13	31	16	10	4	7	7	6	13	16	5	(1.1%)	5
8 Jan 21	Camil Fuchs	Channel 13	31	15	9	4	7	7	5	12	16	5	5	4

Yesh Atid-Telem & The Israelis merger and New Hope & Yamina merger

Date	Polling firm	Publisher	Likud	Yesh Atid- Telem +Israelis	Joint List	Blue & White	Shas	UTJ	Yisrael Beiteinu	New Hope +Yamina	Meretz
Pre-election seats			36	17	15	14	9	7	7	7	3
7 Jan 21	Smith	The Jerusalem Post	30	23	11	–	8	8	6	29	5
7 Jan 21	Smith	The Jerusalem Post	31	22	11	–	8	8	6	29	5

Religious Zionist Party split from Yamina

Date	Polling firm	Publisher	Likud	Yesh Atid -Telem	Joint List	Blue & White	Shas	UTJ	Yisrael Beiteinu	Meretz	Yamina	Religious Zionist	New Hope	Israelis
Pre-election seats			36	16	15	15	9	7	7	3	3	2	2	–
5 Jan 21	Midgam/iPanel	Channel 12	27	13	10	5	8	8	6	5	14		18	6
5 Jan 21	Midgam/iPanel	Channel 12	26	13	10	5	8	8	6	5	16	(2.3%)	17	6

Yesh Atid-Telem & The Israelis merger

Date	Polling firm	Publisher	Likud	Yesh Atid- Telem +Israelis	Joint List	Blue & White	Shas	UTJ	Yisrael Beiteinu	Yamina	New Hope	Meretz
Pre-election seats			36	17	15	14	9	7	7	5	2	3
30 Dec 20	Midgam/iPanel	Channel 12	28	21	11	4	8	8	6	12	17	5
30 Dec 20	Midgam/iPanel	Channel 12	28	21	11	4	8	8	6	12	17	5

Labor with The Israelis, Yesh Atid, Meretz and Ofer Shelah

Date	Polling firm	Publisher	Likud	Yesh Atid +Labor +Shelah +Israelis +Meretz	Joint List	Blue & White	Shas	UTJ	Yisrael Beiteinu	Yamina	New Hope
Pre-election seats			35	23	15	14	9	7	7	5	3
29 Dec 20	Panels Politics	103fm	26	25	12	4	8	7	8	13	17
29 Dec 20	Panels Politics	103fm	27	25	11	4	8	7	8	14	16

Labor with Ofer Shelah, Ron Huldai and Avi Nissenkorn

Date	Polling firm	Publisher	Likud	Yesh Atid -Telem	Joint List	Blue & White	Shas	UTJ	Yisrael Beiteinu	Yamina	New Hope	Meretz	Labor +Shelah +Huldai +Nissenkorn
Pre-election seats			35	17	15	14	9	7	7	5	3	3	3
27 Dec 20	Midgam/iPanel	Channel 12	28	16	11	5	8	8	7	13	19	5	(2.8%)
27 Dec 20	Midgam/iPanel	Channel 12	28	14	11	4	8	8	6	12	18	4	7

Blue and White without Benny Gantz and Gabi Ashkenazi

Date	Polling firm	Publisher	Likud	Yesh Atid -Telem	Joint List	Blue & White	Shas	UTJ	Yisrael Beiteinu	Yamina	New Hope	Meretz
Pre-election seats			35	17	15	14	9	7	7	5	3	3
22 Dec 20	Midgam/iPanel	Channel 12	29	16	11	5	8	8	7	13	18	5
22 Dec 20	Midgam/iPanel	Channel 12	30	19	11	(2.4%)	8	8	7	13	18	6

Ron Huldai party and Ra'am split from Joint List

Date	Polling firm	Publisher	Likud	Yesh Atid -Telem	Blue & White	Joint List	Ra'am	Shas	UTJ	Yisrael Beiteinu	Yamina	New Hope	Meretz	Huldai
Pre-election seats			35	17	14	11	4	9	7	7	5	3	3	N/A
22 Dec 20	Midgam/iPanel	Channel 12	29	16	5	11		8	8	7	13	18	5	N/A
22 Dec 20	Midgam/iPanel	Channel 12	29	14	4	11	(1.1%)	8	8	7	13	16	4	6

Ron Huldai party

Date	Polling firm	Publisher	Likud	Yesh Atid -Telem	Joint List	Blue & White	Shas	UTJ	Yisrael Beiteinu	Yamina	Meretz	New Hope	Huldai
Pre-election seats			35	17	15	14	9	7	7	5	3	3	N/A
15 Dec 20	Midgam/iPanel	Channel 12	27	14	11	6	8	8	6	13	6	21	N/A
15 Dec 20	Midgam/iPanel	Channel 12	27	12	11	5	8	8	5	13	5	22 (Note: including Gadi Eizenkot)	4
15 Dec 20	Midgam/iPanel	Channel 12	28	13	11	6	8	8	6	13	6	17	4

Date	Polling firm	Publisher	Likud	Yesh Atid -Telem	Joint List	Blue & White	Shas	UTJ	Yisrael Beiteinu	Yamina	Meretz	Huldai
Pre-election seats			36	17	15	14	9	7	7	5	3	N/A
1 Nov 20	Camil Fuchs	Channel 13	29	20	12	10	7	7	7	22	6	N/A
1 Nov 20	Camil Fuchs	Channel 13	30	17	11	8	7	7	7	22	4	7
28–29 Oct 20	Maagar Mohot	103fm	28	17	14	10	9	8	8	20	6	N/A
28–29 Oct 20	Maagar Mohot	103fm	28	14	14	9	9	8	7	20	4	7
18 Oct 20	Midgam/iPanel	Channel 12	27	17	15	10	9	7	7	22	6	N/A
18 Oct 20	Midgam/iPanel	Channel 12	27	16	15	8	9	7	6	22	4	6
6 Oct 20	Midgam/iPanel	Channel 12	26	18	15	9	9	7	8	23	5	N/A
6 Oct 20	Midgam/iPanel	Channel 12	26	16	15	7	9	7	7	23	4	6

Gadi Eizenkot joining New Hope

Date	Polling firm	Publisher	Likud	Yesh Atid -Telem	Joint List	Blue & White	Shas	UTJ	Yisrael Beiteinu	Yamina	Meretz	New Hope
Pre-election seats			36	17	15	14	9	7	7	5	3	2
11 Dec 20	Maagar Mohot	Israel Hayom	28	12	13	7	9	7	6	12	6	20
11 Dec 20	Maagar Mohot	Israel Hayom	26	12	12	8	9	6	6	13	6	22

Ron Huldai, Gadi Eizenkot & Moshe Ya'alon party

Date	Polling firm	Publisher	Likud	Joint List	Yesh Atid	Blue & White	Shas	UTJ	Yisrael Beiteinu	Yamina	Meretz	Huldai, Eizenkot & Ya'alon	New Hope
Pre-election seats			36	15	14	14	9	7	7	5	3	3	2
11 Dec 20	Maagar Mohot	Israel Hayom	28	13	12 (Note: including Ya'alon's Telem)	7	9	7	6	12	6	N/A	20
11 Dec 20	Maagar Mohot	Israel Hayom	26	12	12	7	9	6	6	12	5	9	16

Blue and White & Yesh Atid-Telem reunification

Date	Polling firm	Publisher	Likud	Yesh Atid -Telem	Blue & White	Joint List	Shas	UTJ	Yisrael Beiteinu	Yamina	Meretz	New Hope
Pre-election seats			36	17	14	15	9	7	7	5	3	2
11 Dec 20	Maagar Mohot	Israel Hayom	28	12	7	13	9	7	6	12	6	20
11 Dec 20	Maagar Mohot	Israel Hayom	28	18		13	9	7	7	13	6	19

Date	Polling firm	Publisher	Likud	Yesh Atid -Telem	Blue & White	Joint List	Shas	UTJ	Yisrael Beiteinu	Yamina	Meretz
Pre-election seats			36	17	14	15	9	7	7	5	3
3 Dec 20	Midgam/iPanel	Channel 12	30	17	10	12	8	8	7	21	7
3 Dec 20	Midgam/iPanel	Channel 12	31	25		12	8	8	7	22	7

Gadi Eizenkot & Yifat Shasha-Biton joining New Hope

Date	Polling firm	Publisher	Likud	Yesh Atid -Telem	Joint List	Blue & White	Shas	UTJ	Yisrael Beiteinu	Yamina	Meretz	New Hope
Pre-election seats			35	17	15	14	9	7	7	5	3	3
9–10 Dec 20	Panels Politics	Maariv	27	13	12	7	9	7	8	16	5	16
9–10 Dec 20	Panels Politics	Maariv	27	11	12	6	9	7	8	15	5	21
9 Dec 20	Kantar	Kan 11	25	15	11	7	8	7	6	17	6	18
9 Dec 20	Kantar	Kan 11	23	15	11	7	8	7	6	17	6	21
9 Dec 20	Midgam/iPanel	Channel 12	26	15	11	6	8	8	6	18	6	16
9 Dec 20	Midgam/iPanel	Channel 12	26	13	11	5	8	8	5	16	6	22

Ron Huldai joining Yesh Atid-Telem

Date	Polling firm	Publisher	Likud	Yesh Atid -Telem	Joint List	Blue & White	Shas	UTJ	Yisrael Beiteinu	Yamina	Meretz
Pre-election seats			36	17	15	14	9	7	7	5	3
3 Dec 20	Midgam/iPanel	Channel 12	30	17	12	10	8	8	7	21	7
3 Dec 20	Midgam/iPanel	Channel 12	30	21	12	7	8	8	7	21	6

Gadi Eizenkot & Ron Huldai party

Date	Polling firm	Publisher	Likud	Yesh Atid -Telem	Joint List	Blue & White	Shas	UTJ	Yisrael Beiteinu	Yamina	Meretz	Eizenkot & Huldai
Pre-election seats			36	17	15	14	9	7	7	5	3	N/A
2 Dec 20	Camil Fuchs	Channel 13	29	19	11	10	7	7	8	22	7	N/A
2 Dec 20	Camil Fuchs	Channel 13	27	14	9	8	6	7	7	21	6	15
14–15 Oct 20	Maagar Mohot	103fm	28	15	16	9	9	9	7	21	6	N/A
14–15 Oct 20	Maagar Mohot	103fm	27	12	16	7	9	9	7	21	4	10
8 Oct 20	Panels Politics	Maariv	27	16	15	10	9	7	9	22	5	N/A
8 Oct 20	Panels Politics	Maariv	28	13	14	8	9	7	8	20	5	8
7 Oct 20	Maagar Mohot	Channel 20	28	15	16	9	9	9	7	21	6	N/A
7 Oct 20	Maagar Mohot	Channel 20	27	11	16	8	10	9	5	19	4	11
6 Oct 20	Direct Polls	Ice	31	18	13	7	9	7	9	20	6	N/A
6 Oct 20	Direct Polls	Ice	30	13	13	6	9	7	9	19	6	8
11 Sep 20	Maagar Mohot	Israel Hayom	31	13	17	10	9	7	8	20	5	N/A
11 Sep 20	Maagar Mohot	Israel Hayom	32	9	17	6	10	7	7	18	3	11

Gadi Eizenkot party

Date	Polling firm	Publisher	Likud	Yesh Atid -Telem	Joint List	Blue & White	Shas	UTJ	Yisrael Beiteinu	Yamina	Meretz	Eizenkot
Pre-election seats			36	17	15	14	9	7	7	5	3	N/A
1 Dec 20	Panels Politics	103fm	29	18	12	10	8	7	8	23	5	N/A
1 Dec 20	Panels Politics	103fm	28	18	12	8	8	7	8	22	5	4

Gadi Eizenkot & Ron Huldai party and Yifat Shasha-Biton party

Date	Polling firm	Publisher	Likud	Yesh Atid -Telem	Joint List	Blue & White	Shas	UTJ	Yisrael Beiteinu	Yamina	Meretz	Shasha- Biton	Eizenkot & Huldai
Pre-election seats			35	17	15	14	9	7	7	5	3	1	N/A
27 Nov 20	Midgam/iPanel	Channel 12	30	18	13	9	8	8	8	20	6	N/A	N/A
27 Nov 20	Midgam/iPanel	Channel 12	28	15	13	7	8	8	8	18	4	5	7
7 Oct 20	Smith	Likud											
7 Oct 20	Smith	Likud	29	12	17	7	9	8-7	6	17	–	5-4	12

Yifat Shasha-Biton party

Date	Polling firm	Publisher	Likud	Yesh Atid -Telem	Joint List	Blue & White	Shas	UTJ	Yisrael Beiteinu	Yamina	Meretz	Shasha- Biton
Pre-election seats			35	17	15	14	9	7	7	5	3	1
18 Oct 20	Midgam/iPanel	Channel 12	27	17	15	10	9	7	7	22	6	N/A
18 Oct 20	Midgam/iPanel	Channel 12	26	16	15	8	9	7	6	21	6	6
23 Sep 20	Midgam/iPanel	Channel 12	29	17	15	9	9	7	8	21	5	N/A
23 Sep 20	Midgam/iPanel	Channel 12	26	16	15	7	9	7	8	19	5	8

Ofer Shelah leading Yesh Atid

Date	Polling firm	Publisher	Likud	Yesh Atid -Telem	Joint List	Blue & White	Shas	UTJ	Yisrael Beiteinu	Yamina	Meretz
Pre-election seats			36	17	15	14	9	7	7	5	3
11 Sep 20	Maagar Mohot	Israel Hayom	31	13	17	10	9	7	8	20	5
11 Sep 20	Maagar Mohot	Israel Hayom	33	11	17	11	9	7	8	19	5
4 Sep 20	Midgam	Channel 12	31	15	15	11	8	7	8	19	6
4 Sep 20	Midgam	Channel 12	31	13	15	11	8	7	9	19	7

Gabi Ashkenazi leading Blue & White

Date	Polling firm	Publisher	Likud	Yesh Atid -Telem	Joint List	Blue & White	Shas	UTJ	Yisrael Beiteinu	Yamina	Meretz
Pre-election seats			36	17	15	14	9	7	7	5	3
11 Sep 20	Maagar Mohot	Israel Hayom	31	13	17	10	9	7	8	20	5
11 Sep 20	Maagar Mohot	Israel Hayom	32	13	17	11	9	7	8	19	4

Gadi Eizenkot leading Blue & White

Date	Polling firm	Publisher	Likud	Yesh Atid -Telem	Joint List	Blue & White	Shas	UTJ	Yisrael Beiteinu	Yamina	Meretz
Pre-election seats			36	17	15	14	9	7	7	5	3
6–7 Aug 20	Midgam	Channel 12	31	18	15	11	8	8	7	16	6
6–7 Aug 20	Midgam	Channel 12	31	17	15	12	8	8	7	16	6

Shulman party

Date	Polling firm	Publisher	Likud	Yesh Atid -Telem	Joint List	Blue & White	Shas	UTJ	Yisrael Beiteinu	Yamina	Meretz	Shulman
Pre-election seats			36	17	15	14	9	7	7	5	3	N/A
17 Jun 20	Smith	The Jerusalem Post	41	15	16	10	9	7	8	8	6	N/A
17 Jun 20	Smith	The Jerusalem Post	40	14 (Note: In case where Gadi Eizenkot runs as Yesh Atid's No. 2 candidate)	16	10	9	7	7	7 (Note: In case where Yoaz Hendel runs as part of Yamina)	6	4
8 Jun 20	Midgam	Channel 12	40	14	15	12	9	7	9	8	6	N/A
8 Jun 20	Midgam	Channel 12	38	13	15	11	9	7	8	8	6	5

== Prime minister ==
Due to the political deadlock, Shas chairman and Interior Minister Aryeh Deri suggested direct elections for prime minister. Some opinion pollsters have asked voters which party leader they would prefer as prime minister. Their responses are given as percentages in the graphs and tables below.

=== Graphs ===
Included below are polls including Netanyahu, Lapid, Gantz and Bennet. Only such polls which distinguish undecided voters from those who support other candidates affect the "None" and "Don't know" values.

This graph shows the polling trends from the 2 March 2020 Israeli legislative election until the next election day using 4-poll moving average.

=== Polls ===
Various candidates

Date	Polling firm	Publisher	Netanyahu	Lapid	Gantz	Bennett	Sa'ar	Huldai	Eizenkot	None	Don't Know
19 Mar 21	Camil Fuchs	Channel 13	38	22	–	11	11	–	–	–	–
18–19 Mar 21	Midgam/iPanel	Channel 12	36	23	–	7	12	–	–	15	7
16–18 Mar 21	Maagar Mohot	Israel Hayom	45	25	5	12	13	–	–	–	–
16 Mar 21	Midgam/iPanel	Channel 12	37	21	–	10	9	–	–	16	7
14 Mar 21	Camil Fuchs	Channel 13	35	21	–	10	12	–	–	–	–
11 Mar 21	Maagar Mohot	Israel Hayom	37	19	4	9	10	–	–	–	21
10 Mar 21	Midgam/iPanel	Channel 12	35	20	–	10	12	–	–	15	8
9 Mar 21	Camil Fuchs	Channel 13	35	20	–	12	13	–	–	–	–
4 Mar 21	Maagar Mohot	Israel Hayom	36	19	3	9	12	–	–	–	21
2 Mar 21	Camil Fuchs	Channel 13	36	19	–	12	13	–	–	–	–
2 Mar 21	Maagar Mohot	Channel 20	36	17	4	8	13	–	–	–	–
25 Feb 21	Camil Fuchs	Channel 13	37	21	–	9	14	–	–	–	–
23 Feb 21	Midgam/iPanel	Channel 12	31	20	–	13	15	–	–	15	6
16 Feb 21	Midgam	Channel 12	32	20	–	8	13	–	–	18	9
15 Feb 21	Camil Fuchs	Channel 13	34	17	–	10	18	–	–	–	–
11 Feb 21	Maagar Mohot	Israel Hayom	32	14	4	11	13	–	–	–	26
10 Feb 21	Midgam/iPanel	Channel 12	30	23	–	10	12	–	–	16	9
8 Feb 21	Maagar Mohot	Channel 20	46	25	5	8	16	–	–	–	–
5 Feb 21	Camil Fuchs	Channel 13	37	15	5	10	13	–	–	–	–
2 Feb 21	Camil Fuchs	Channel 13	35	14	7	9	16	–	–	–	–
28 Jan 21	Maagar Mohot	Israel Hayom	33	14	3	10	12	5	–	–	23
26 Jan 21	Midgam/iPanel	Channel 12	28	12	–	12	14	8	–	18	8
24 Jan 21	Panels Politics	103fm	32	12	3	11	21	–	–	11	10
14 Jan 21	Maagar Mohot	Channel 20	33	12	3	9	12	5	–	–	26
8 Jan 21	Camil Fuchs	Channel 13	37	12	5	11	17	–	–	–	–
5 Jan 21	Midgam/iPanel	Channel 12	27	14	6	13	16	–	–	14	10
30 Dec 20	Camil Fuchs	Channel 13	38	12	4	9	18	–	–	–	–
24 Dec 20	Panels Politics	Maariv	33	9	4	10	17	–	–	–	–
22 Dec 20	Kantar	Kan 11	39	–	–	23	36	–	–	–	–
22 Dec 20	Midgam/iPanel	Channel 12	33	12	4	8	16	–	–	18	9
20 Dec 20	Camil Fuchs	Channel 13	32	12	8	12	15	–	–	–	–
17 Dec 20	Panels Politics	Maariv	37	10	–	10	16	–	–	–	–
15 Dec 20	Panels Politics	103fm	31	10	4	11	17	–	–	–	–
15 Dec 20	Midgam/iPanel	Channel 12	33	8	7	9	18	–	–	18	7
11 Dec 20	Maagar Mohot	Israel Hayom	38	15	8	13	18	6	2	–	–
9 Dec 20	Camil Fuchs	Channel 13	31	11	8	12	16	–	–	–	–
9 Dec 20	Midgam/iPanel	Channel 12	29	10	5	13	16	–	–	16	–
3 Dec 20	Midgam/iPanel	Channel 12	33	13	7	18	–	–	–	–	–
2 Dec 20	Camil Fuchs	Channel 13	34	14	13	19	–	–	–	–	–
24 Nov 20	Kantar	Kan 11	36	11	6	19	–	–	–	20	–
24 Nov 20	Camil Fuchs	Channel 13	32	15	12	21	–	–	–	–	–
17 Nov 20	Camil Fuchs	Channel 13	33	16	13	18	–	–	–	–	–
11–12 Nov 20	Maagar Mohot	103fm	32	8	7	21	–	–	–	–	–
1 Nov 20	Camil Fuchs	Channel 13	36	15	11	21	–	–	–	–	17
18 Oct 20	Camil Fuchs	Channel 13	36	19	15	25	–	–	–	–	–
18 Oct 20	Midgam/iPanel	Channel 12	32	9	6	21	–	–	–	22	–
16 Sep 20	Camil Fuchs	Channel 13	31	13	10	18	–	–	–	–	28
11 Sep 20	Maagar Mohot	Israel Hayom	32	12	10	17	–	–	–	–	29
7 Sep 20	Camil Fuchs	Channel 13	32	13	10	18	–	–	–	–	27
4 Sep 20	Midgam	Channel 12	37	16	18	28	–	–	–	–	–
2–3 Sep 20	Maagar Mohot	103fm	31	13	9	11	–	–	–	–	36
23 Aug 20	Camil Fuchs	Channel 13	38	15	9	17	–	–	–	–	21
16 Aug 20	Camil Fuchs	Channel 13	36	16	10	15	–	–	–	–	26
6 Aug 20	Kantar	Kan 11	37	15	10	19	–	–	–	20	–
30 Jul 20	Maagar Mohot	Israel Hayom	33	13	11	12	–	–	–	–	31
23 Jul 20	Camil Fuchs	Channel 13	44	16	11	–	–	–	–	–	30
23 Jul 20	Midgam	Channel 12	34	15	10	14	–	–	–	22	5
22 Jul 20	Direct Polls	–	29.1	22.6	11	19.2	–	–	–	14.2	–

Netanyahu vs. Sa'ar

Date	Polling firm	Publisher	Netanyahu	Sa'ar	Neither	Don't Know
18 Mar 21	Panels Politics	Maariv	45	41	–	–
17–18 Mar 21	Kantar	Kan 11	44	27	–	–
15 Mar 21	Panels Politics	103fm	44	43	–	–
11 Mar 21	Panels Politics	Maariv	44	40	–	–
11 Mar 21	Kantar	Kan 11	41	28	–	–
4 Mar 21	Panels Politics	Maariv	42	41	–	17
28 Feb 21	Panels Politics	103fm	43	42	–	15
25 Feb 21	Panels Politics	Maariv	45	36	–	–
11 Feb 21	Panels Politics	Maariv	44	41	–	15
9 Feb 21	Kantar	Kan 11	38	33	29	–
7 Feb 21	Panels Politics	103fm	45	41	–	–
5 Feb 21	Midgam/iPanel	Channel 12	34	31	27	8
4 Feb 21	Panels Politics	Maariv	47	42	–	–
28 Jan 21	Panels Politics	Maariv	46	41	–	13
21 Jan 21	Panels Politics	Maariv	43	40	–	–
8 Jan 21	Camil Fuchs	Channel 13	42	36	15	–
30 Dec 20	Midgam/iPanel	Channel 12	34	32	28	–
30 Dec 20	Kantar	Kan 11	41	33	–	–
9 Dec 20	Kantar	Kan 11	40	32	–	–

Netanyahu vs. Lapid

Date	Polling firm	Publisher	Netanyahu	Lapid	Neither	Don't Know
18 Mar 21	Panels Politics	Maariv	51	37	–	–
17–18 Mar 21	Kantar	Kan 11	47	30	–	–
15 Mar 21	Panels Politics	103fm	49	40	–	–
11 Mar 21	Panels Politics	Maariv	49	40	–	–
11 Mar 21	Kantar	Kan 11	46	29	–	–
4 Mar 21	Panels Politics	Maariv	48	41	–	11
28 Feb 21	Panels Politics	103fm	50	37	–	13
25 Feb 21	Panels Politics	Maariv	55	32	–	–
11 Feb 21	Panels Politics	Maariv	55	37	–	8
9 Feb 21	Kantar	Kan 11	45	28	27	–
7 Feb 21	Panels Politics	103fm	54	37	–	–
5 Feb 21	Midgam/iPanel	Channel 12	42	25	26	7
4 Feb 21	Panels Politics	Maariv	56	36	–	–
28 Jan 21	Panels Politics	Maariv	56	34	–	10
21 Jan 21	Panels Politics	Maariv	54	32	–	–
30 Dec 20	Midgam/iPanel	Channel 12	38	22	–	–
7 Nov 20	Midgam/iPanel	Channel 12	40	20	–	–
16 Aug 20	Midgam	Channel 12	46	22	–	–
6-7 Aug 20	Midgam	Channel 12	45	21	27	7

Netanyahu vs. Bennett

Date	Polling firm	Publisher	Netanyahu	Bennett	Neither	Don't Know
18 Mar 21	Panels Politics	Maariv	41	41	–	–
17–18 Mar 21	Kantar	Kan 11	42	21	–	–
15 Mar 21	Panels Politics	103fm	40	36	–	–
11 Mar 21	Panels Politics	Maariv	39	37	–	–
11 Mar 21	Kantar	Kan 11	41	21	–	–
4 Mar 21	Panels Politics	Maariv	39	38	–	23
28 Feb 21	Panels Politics	103fm	40	36	–	24
25 Feb 21	Panels Politics	Maariv	43	33	–	–
11 Feb 21	Panels Politics	Maariv	42	34	–	24
7 Feb 21	Panels Politics	103fm	43	35	–	–
5 Feb 21	Midgam/iPanel	Channel 12	33	24	36	7
4 Feb 21	Panels Politics	Maariv	43	39	–	–
28 Jan 21	Panels Politics	Maariv	42	36	–	22
21 Jan 21	Panels Politics	Maariv	41	33	–	–
30 Dec 20	Midgam/iPanel	Channel 12	33	23	39	–
9 Dec 20	Kantar	Kan 11	39	25	–	–
7 Nov 20	Midgam/iPanel	Channel 12	32	28	–	–
28–29 Oct 20	Maagar Mohot	103fm	65	35	40	–
16 Aug 20	Midgam	Channel 12	39	24	–	–
6-7 Aug 20	Midgam	Channel 12	36	26	32	6

Netanyahu vs. Gantz

Date	Polling firm	Publisher	Netanyahu	Gantz	Neither	Don't Know
5 Feb 21	Midgam/iPanel	Channel 12	40	18	37	5
30 Dec 20	Midgam/iPanel	Channel 12	37	17	–	–
7 Nov 20	Midgam/iPanel	Channel 12	36	15	42	–
16 Aug 20	Midgam	Channel 12	43	16	–	–
6-7 Aug 20	Midgam	Channel 12	38	19	36	5
13 Mar 20	Maagar Mohot	Israel Hayom	47	36	–	17
12 Mar 20	Midgam	Channel 12	45	33	14	8

Netanyahu vs. Huldai

Date	Polling firm	Publisher	Netanyahu	Huldai	Neither	Don't Know
30 Dec 20	Midgam/iPanel	Channel 12	37	22	–	–

Netanyahu vs. Eizenkot

Date	Polling firm	Publisher	Netanyahu	Eizenkot	Neither	Don't Know
6-7 Aug 20	Midgam	Channel 12	43	18	27	12

== Coalition ==
Some opinion pollsters have asked voters which coalition they would prefer. The tables below list their responses as percentages.

Minority government backed by the Joint List

Date	Polling firm	Publisher	Support	Oppose	Don't Know
13 Mar 20	Maagar Mohot	Israel Hayom	31	55	14

General

Date	Polling firm	Publisher	National unity government		Right	Left	Don't Know
Date	Polling firm	Publisher	Likud-B&W only	w/ more parties	Right	Left	Don't Know
13 Mar 20	Maagar Mohot	Israel Hayom	17	31	26	17	9
