= Yesh Atid–Telem =

Israeli political party

Yesh Atid–Telem יש עתיד-תל״ם
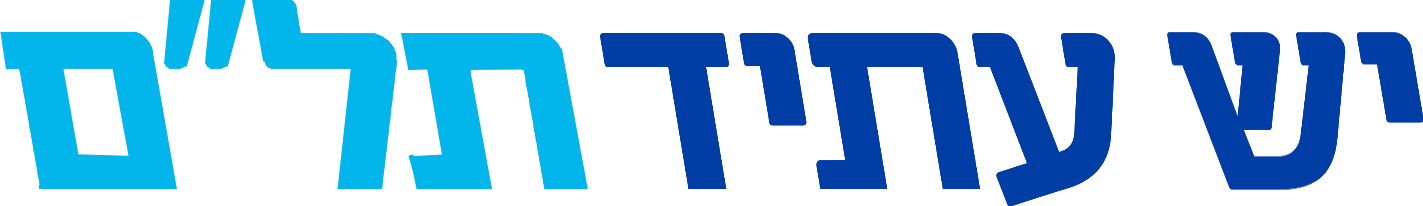
- Leader: Yair Lapid
- Founded: 29 March 2020
- Dissolved: 9 January 2021
- Split from: Blue and White
- Ideology: Zionism; Liberalism; Secularism; Economic liberalism Anti-corruption; Factions: National liberalism Two-state solution
- Political position: Centre
- Member parties: Yesh Atid; Telem
- Colours: Blue; Sky blue
- Slogan: "We are here to change"
- Most MKs: 16 (2020)

Yesh Atid–Telem (Hebrew: יש עתיד-תל״ם) was a centrist parliamentary faction in Israel. It was formed in March 2020 by Yair Lapid's Yesh Atid party and Moshe Ya'alon's Telem party after the dissolution of the larger Blue and White alliance.

== History ==
Ahead of the April 2019 election, the leader of the Yesh Atid party, Yair Lapid, and the leader of the Israel Resilience Party, Benny Gantz, announced the formation of a joint list known as "Blue and White", which also included the Telem party, led by Moshe Ya'alon, and Independent politician Gabi Ashkenazi. It was decided that Gantz and Lapid would run together as candidates for prime minister, and would rotate the role between themselves. Blue and White came in second place in the April election, receiving 26.13% of the vote, and tying with the rival Likud party in the number of Knesset seats, with both getting 35.

However, the term of the twenty-first Knesset was short-lived, as a majority of MKs voted to dissolve the Knesset following the failure of the Likud leader, Benjamin Netanyahu, to form a governing coalition. A snap election took place on 17 September 2019, resulting in Blue and White coming in first with 33 Knesset seats and 25.95% of the vote. After failing to form a coalition once again, Netanyahu returned the mandate to form a government back to President Reuven Rivlin, who, in turn, bestowed it on Gantz. After the mandate expired, Gantz was similarly unable to form a government. After a two-week period passed, (in which any Member of the Knesset could be chosen to form a coalition) the twenty-Second Knesset was dissolved and an unprecedented third snap election was called for March 2020.

In December 2019, ahead of upcoming elections for the twenty-third Knesset, it was agreed that Gantz would be Blue and White's sole candidate for prime minister. In the election, Blue and White lost their top position to a resurgent Likud party, with B&W keeping its 33 seats and Likud receiving 36 seats. However, Gantz received more recommendations than Netanyahu and was given the mandate to form a government. Gantz began negotiations to form a unity government with incumbent Prime Minister Benjamin Netanyahu and his Likud party. In response to this development, Yair Lapid and his Yesh Atid party, along with Moshe Ya'alon's Telem party, applied to split their factions from Blue and White. This split was officially ratified by the House Committee of the Knesset on 29 March 2020, after which Yesh Atid and Telem formed a joint parliamentary faction known as Yesh Atid–Telem.

Yesh Atid and Telem split in January 2021.

== Composition ==
Yesh Atid–Telem consisted of two political parties which held a combined 16 seats in the Knesset.

Name	Ideology	Position	Leader	MKs in 23rd Knesset
Yesh Atid	Liberalism	Centre	Yair Lapid	13 / 120
Telem	National liberalism	Centre-right	Moshe Ya'alon	3 / 120

== Leaders ==
Leader	Took office	Left office
Yair Lapid	2020	2021

== Election results ==
Election	Leader	Votes	%	Seats	+/–	Status
2020	Yair Lapid; Moshe Ya'alon	Part of Blue and White		16 / 120	–	Opposition

== Knesset members ==
Knesset term	Seats	Faction	Members
23rd (2020–2021)	13	Yesh Atid	Yair Lapid, Meir Cohen, Ofer Shelah, Orna Barbivai, Yael German, Karin Elharar, Yoel Razvozov, Elazar Stern, Mickey Levy, Pnina Tamano-Shata, Ram Ben Barak, Yoav Segalovitz, Boaz Toporovsky
23rd (2020–2021)	3	Telem	Moshe Ya'alon, Orly Fruman, Andrey Kozhinov (Note: After the dissolution of the Blue and White alliance, Yoaz Hendel and Zvi Hauser separated from Telem to form their own faction called Derekh Eretz.)
