= Moshe Tamir =

Moshe Tamir may refer to one of the following people:

- Moshe Tamir (general) (Hebrew: משה תמיר), an Israeli brigadier general
- Moshe Tamir (painter) (Hebrew: משה טמיר), an Israeli painter
