= Moshe Yosef =

Moshe Yosef may refer to:

- Moshe Yosef (footballer), Israeli footballer
- Moshe Yosef (rabbi)
