= Moshe Tamir (painter) =

Russian-born Israeli painter

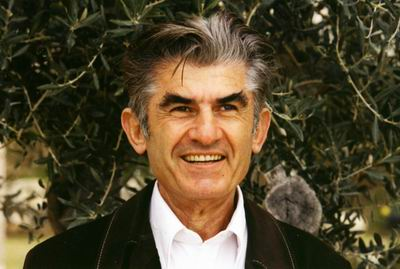
Moshe Tamir

Moshe Tamir (Hebrew: משה טמיר; 1924 – 13 November 2004) was a Russian-born Israeli painter.

== Education ==
After leaving the Bezalel Academy of Arts and Design in Jerusalem in 1944, he moved to the Fine Arts Academy in Rome, Italy, graduating in 1952. He completed his Advance studies at the École des Beaux-Arts, Paris, in 1955.

== Awards and commemoration ==
- 1947 Award of Bezalel's Struck prize
- 1949 "young Israeli Artists", Tel Aviv Artist's House, winning an award for his painting "Wounded Amnon"
- Chosen among the 20 best young artists in Europe participating in the Exhibition of the Museum of Modern Art in Paris
- 1961 First prize of the Museum of Rio de Janeiro for his graphic work at the Biennale of São Paulo, Brazil
- 1961 Director of "New Bezalel", Jerusalem
- 1963 National inspector of the Art Studies, and Art Advisor to the Minister of Culture and Education in Jerusalem
- 1980 Interior planning and fresco paintings at the Convention Hall (Palazzo Vecchio)

== Collections ==
- Moshe Tamir Collection at Presler Private Museum, Tel Aviv, Israel
- "Wounded Amnon" Fresco, collection of the Tel Aviv Museum of Art
- Museums of Jerusalem, Tel Aviv, Haifa and Ein Harod, Israel
- Victoria and Albert Museum, London, Amsterdam, Bogota, Caracas, Rio de Janeiro, New York, Chicago, San Francisco, Baltimore, Philadelphia. Denver Art Museum, State Museum of Belgium, SA Private Collection of the Queen Mother of Belgium and many private collections in Israel, Europe, America, South America and Canada

== Bibliography ==
- Moshe Tamir, Guy Pieters, 1999
- Moshe Tamir: The Epos and the Myth, Gideon Ofrat.
