= Moshe Peled =

Moshe Peled may refer to:

- Moshe Peled (politician), Israeli politician, Knesset member between 1992 and 1999
- Moshe Peled (soldier) (1926–2000), Israeli general
