= Orly Fruman =

Israeli politician

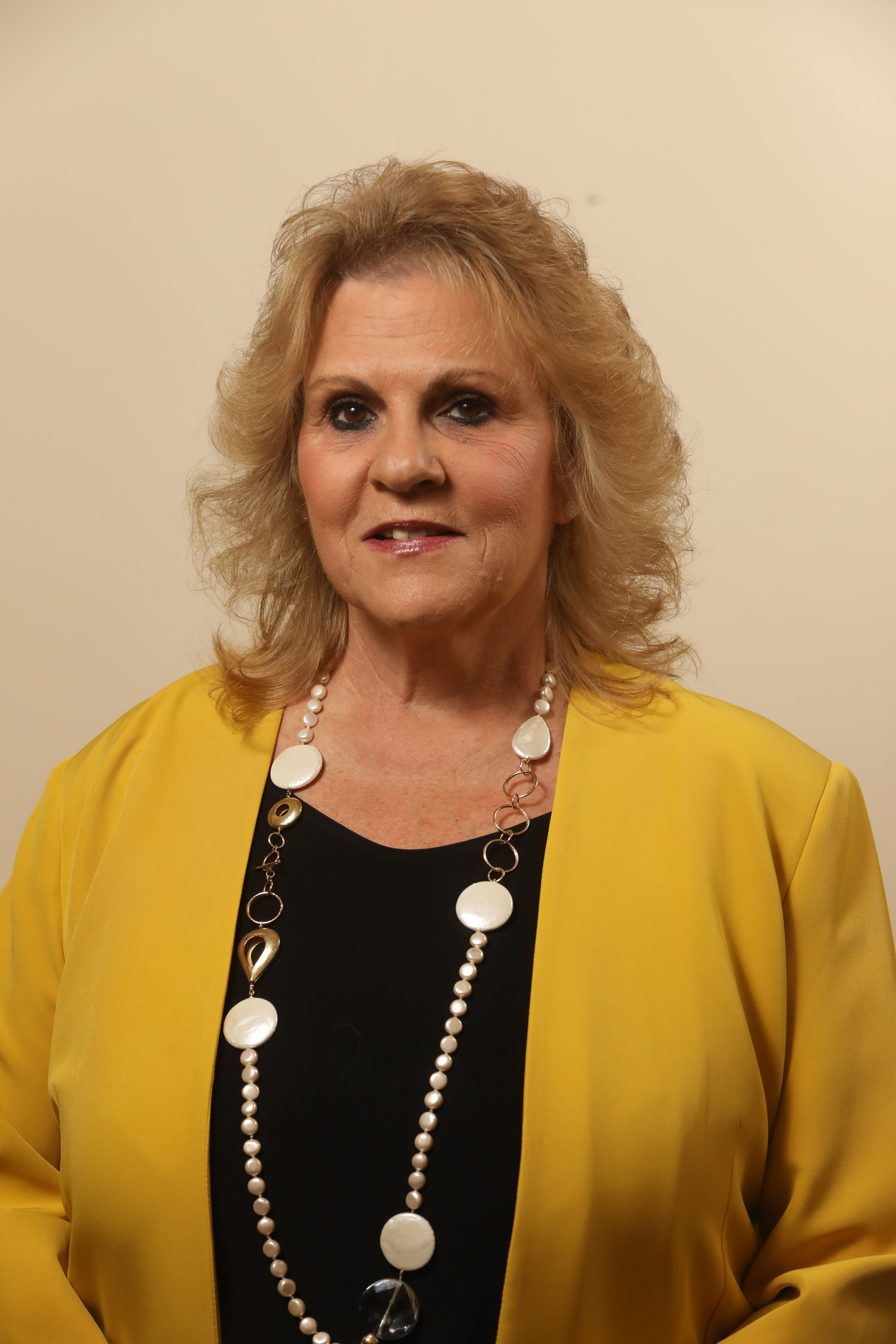

Faction represented in the Knesset
- 2019–2020: Blue and White
- 2020–2021: Telem

Personal details
- Born: 14 June 1955 (age 71) Rishon LeZion, Israel

Orly Froman (Hebrew: אורלי פרומן; born 14 June 1955) is an Israeli politician. She served as a member of the Knesset for Telem between 2019 and 2021.

== Biography ==
Froman was born and grew up in Rishon LeZion, the daughter of Israel Lolek Pupko and Dvora Popko. She was educated at Haviv elementary school and Gymnasia Realit and was a member of the Maccabi Hatzair youth movement. She began playing handball at school and later played for Maccabi Rishon LeZion and the Israel women's national handball team.

During her national service in the Israel Defense Forces she was commander of a training base and an instructor for an officers' course, reaching the rank of lieutenant by the time she completed her service. She studied mathematics and computer science at Ben-Gurion University of the Negev, earned a mathematics teaching certificate and gained a master's degree in communications from the Clark University in Israel. In 1976 she started working as a research assistant in the Department of Education at Ben-Gurion University, and became deputy head of schools in Beersheba and Givatayim. After helping establish a new school in Ramat Gan, she was its head from 1990 until 1996.

In 1997 Froman was appointed deputy head of the Education Division and Director of Education at Ramat Gan city council. In 2001 she became head of the Tel Aviv District branch of the Ministry of Education, a post she held until being appointed Director-General of the Ministry of Culture and Sport by Minister Limor Livnat in 2009. She remained at the ministry until 2015, when Livnat stepped down. In 2016 Froman became Director of Education at Kfar Saba city council.

In 2019 Froman joined the new Telem party. After the party became part of the Blue and White alliance, she was given the thirty-first slot on the joint list for the April 2019 elections, and was subsequently elected to the Knesset as the alliance won 35 seats. She was re-elected in September 2019 and March 2020. When Blue and White split, she became a member of the Yesh Atid–Telem faction. She lost her seat in the 2021 elections, which Telem did not contest.

Froman is married with three children.
