= Moshe Teitelbaum =

Moshe Teitelbaum may refer to:

- Moshe Teitelbaum (Ujhel) (1759–1841), Hasidic Rebbe
- Moshe Teitelbaum (Satmar) (1914–2006), Hasidic Rebbe
