= Moshe Katz =

Moshe Katz may refer to:

- Moshe Katz (editor, born 1864) (1864–1941), American editor and activist
- Moyshe Katz (writer, born 1885) (1885–1960), Russian–American writer, Zionist, and proponent of Yiddish culture
- Morris Katz (1932–2010), American painter
