= Andrey Kozhinov =

Israeli politician

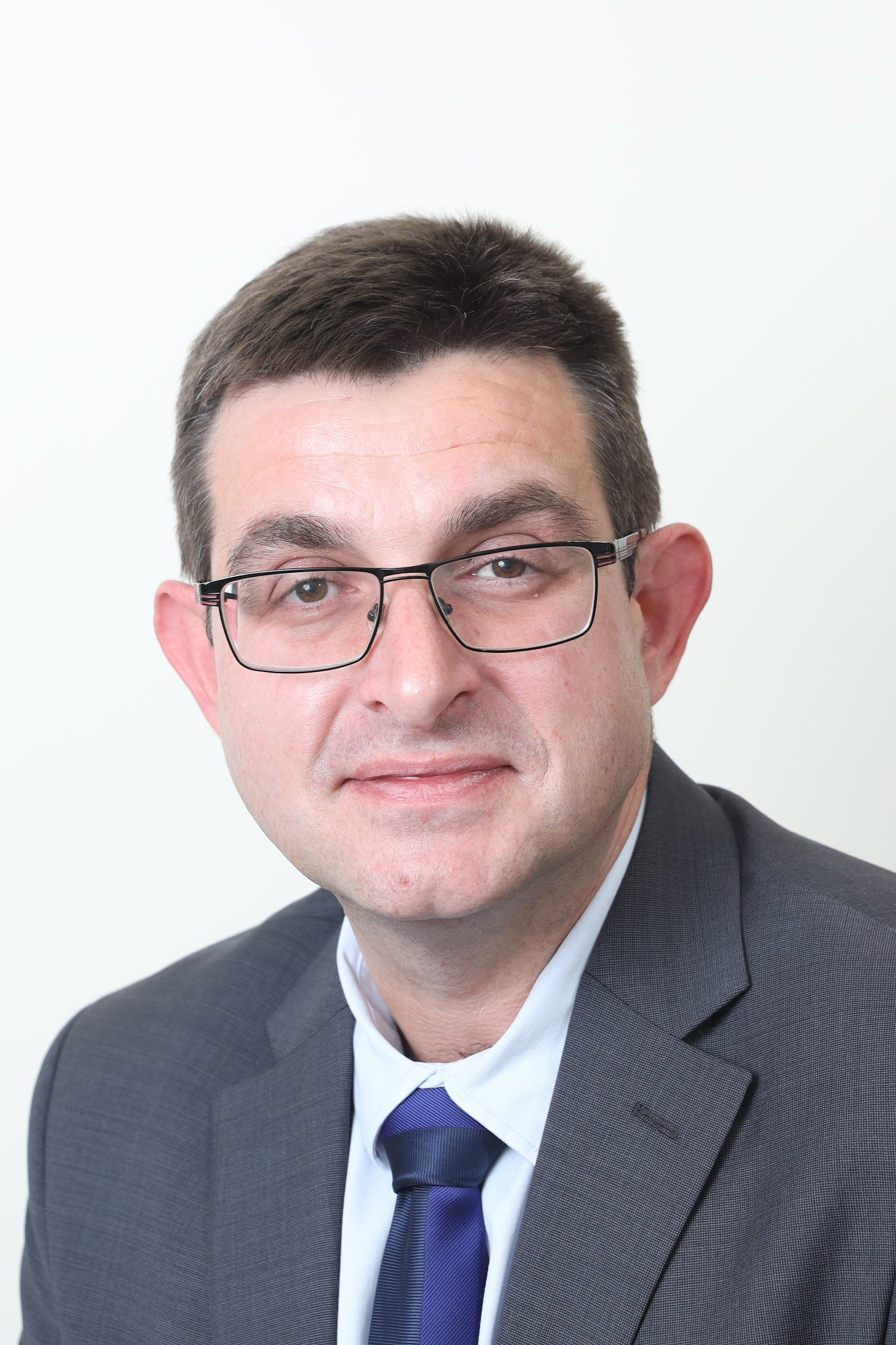
- Kozhinov in 2020

Faction represented in the Knesset
- 2020: Blue and White
- 2020–2021: Telem

Personal details
- Born: 28 December 1979 (age 46) Kazan, Soviet Union

Andrey Kozhinov (Hebrew: אנדריי קוז'ינוב; born 28 December 1979) is an Israeli journalist, researcher and politician. He served as a member of the Knesset for Telem between 2020 and 2021.

== Biography ==
Kozhinov was born in Kazan in the Soviet Union. After immigrating to Israel, he served in the IDF Spokesperson's Unit as head of the Russian media desk during his national service. He earned a bachelor's degree in international relations and a master's degree in social sciences at the Hebrew University of Jerusalem. He worked as a researcher at MEMRI and for Channel 9 as its military correspondent.

After joining the new Telem party, Kozhinov was placed eighty-third on the Blue and White list for the April 2019 Knesset elections. However, the alliance only won 35 seats. He was placed ninety-third for the September 2019 elections, again failing to be elected. However, after being moved up to thirty-third place on the list for the March 2020 elections, he was elected to the Knesset as the alliance won 33 seats. He lost his seat in the March 2021 elections, which Telem did not contest.
