= Moshe Bar =

Moshe Bar may refer to:

- Moshe Bar (investor) (born 1971), Israeli/American technologist and author, and founder of Qumranet
- Moshe Bar (neuroscientist) (born 1964), scientist at Bar-Ilan University and previously at Harvard Medical School
- Moshe Bar-Asher (born 1939), Israeli linguist
