= Moshe Ya'alon =

Israeli general and politician (born 1950)

- משה יעלון
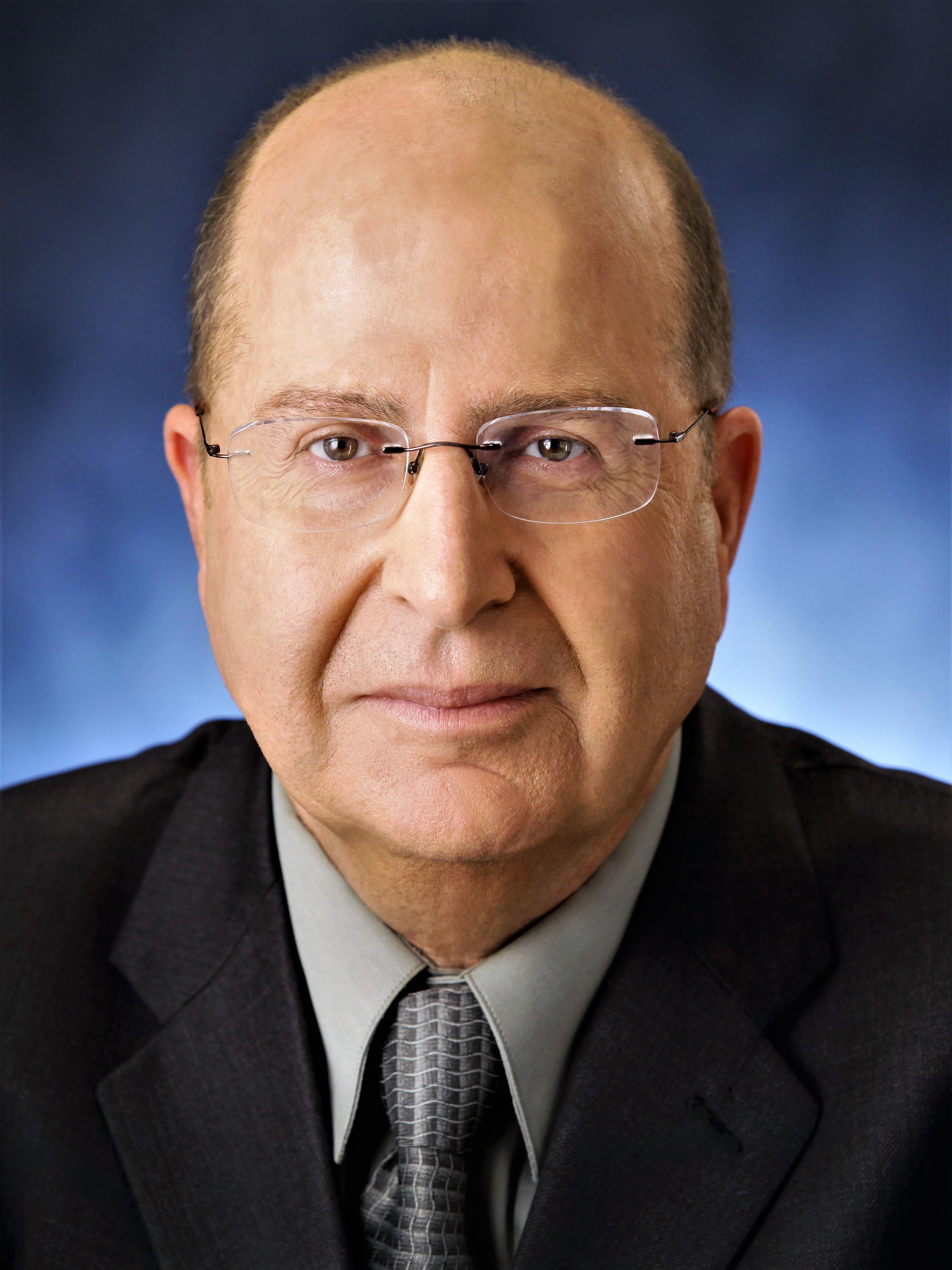

Ministerial roles
- 2009–2013: Vice Prime Minister
- 2009–2013: Minister of Strategic Affairs
- 2013–2016: Minister of Defense

Faction represented in the Knesset
- 2009–2016: Likud
- 2019–2020: Blue and White
- 2020–2021: Telem

Military roles
- 1995–1998: Head of Aman
- 1998–2000: Head of Central Command
- 1999–2002: Deputy Chief of the General Staff
- 2002–2005: Chief of the General Staff

Personal details
- Born: 24 June 1950 (age 76) Kiryat Haim, Haifa, Haifa District, Israel
- Awards: Legion of Merit
- Nickname: Bogie

Military service
- Allegiance: Israel
- Branch/service: Israel Defense Forces
- Years of service: 1968–2005
- Rank: Rav Aluf
- Commands: Sayeret Matkal; AMAN; Central Command; Chief of the General Staff; Paratroopers Brigade; West Bank Division
- Battles/wars: War of Attrition; 1982 Lebanon War; South Lebanon conflict; First Intifada; Operation Litani; Operation Protective Edge; Second Intifada; Yom Kippur War

Moshe "Bogie" Ya'alon (Hebrew: משה יעלון; born Moshe Smilansky; 24 June 1950) is a retired Israeli politician and former Chief of the General Staff of the Israel Defense Forces. He served as Israel's Defense Minister under Benjamin Netanyahu from 2013 to 2016.

He was elected in the April 2019 Israeli election as part of the Blue and White list, and served in the Knesset as a member of the faction until joining the Yesh Atid-Telem created following the 2020 election. Ya'alon retired from politics in the lead up to the 2021 election after splitting his Telem party from Yesh Atid.

== Early life ==
Ya'alon was born Moshe Smilansky, the son of David Smilansky and Batya Silber. His father, a factory worker, had moved to Mandatory Palestine with his parents from Soviet Ukraine in 1925, and was a veteran of the Haganah and Jewish Brigade. His mother was a Holocaust survivor from Galicia who had fought against the Nazis with partisans during World War II. She came to Palestine in 1946. Ya'alon grew up in Kiryat Haim, a working-class suburb of Haifa. He was active in the Labor Zionist youth movement "HaNoar HaOved VeHaLomed" and joined a Nahal group named Ya'alon, a name he later adopted. He later moved to kibbutz Grofit, in the Arava region near Eilat, where he worked in the cowshed and as a tractor operator.

== Military career ==
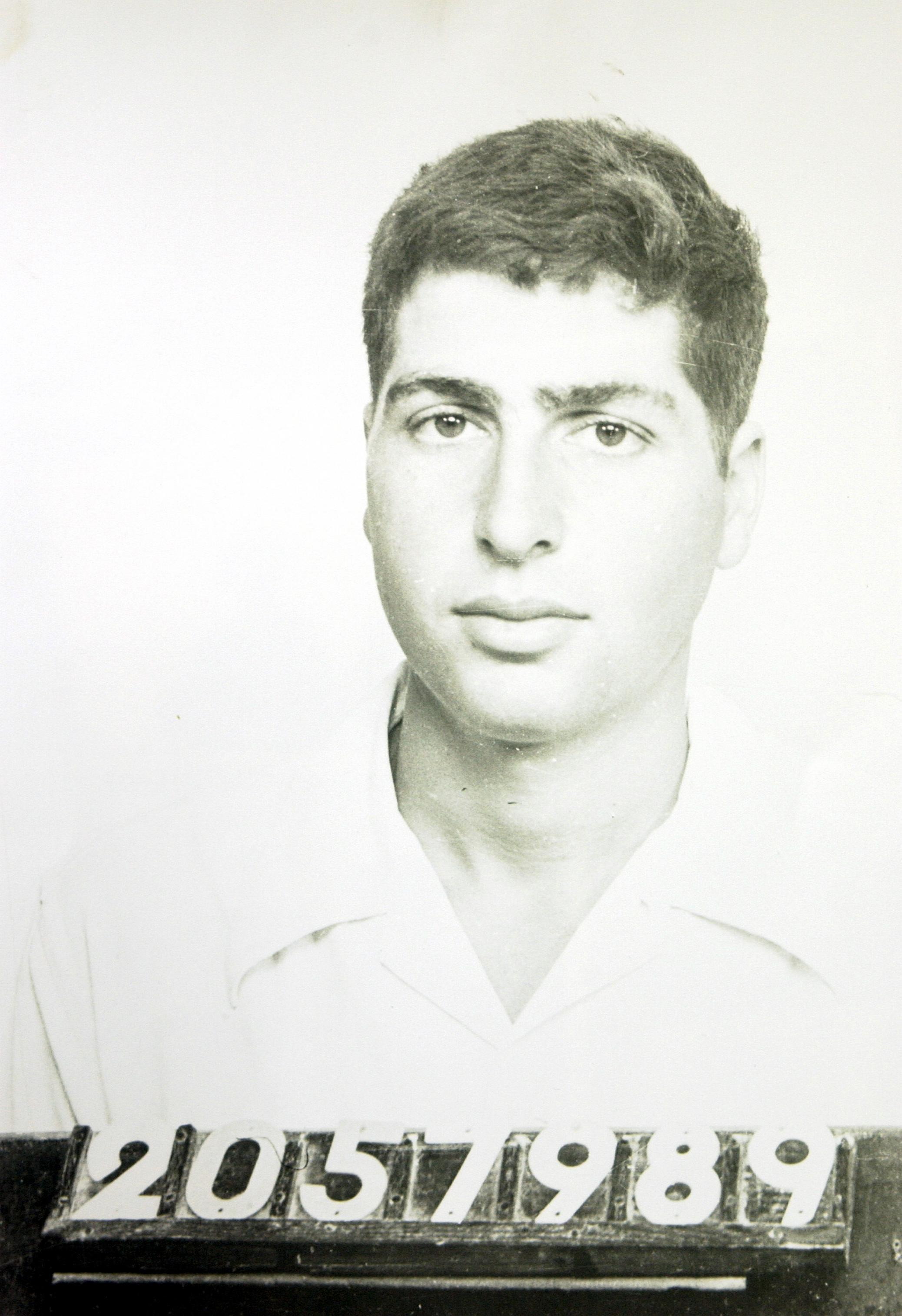
Moshe Ya'alon's IDF induction photo, 1967

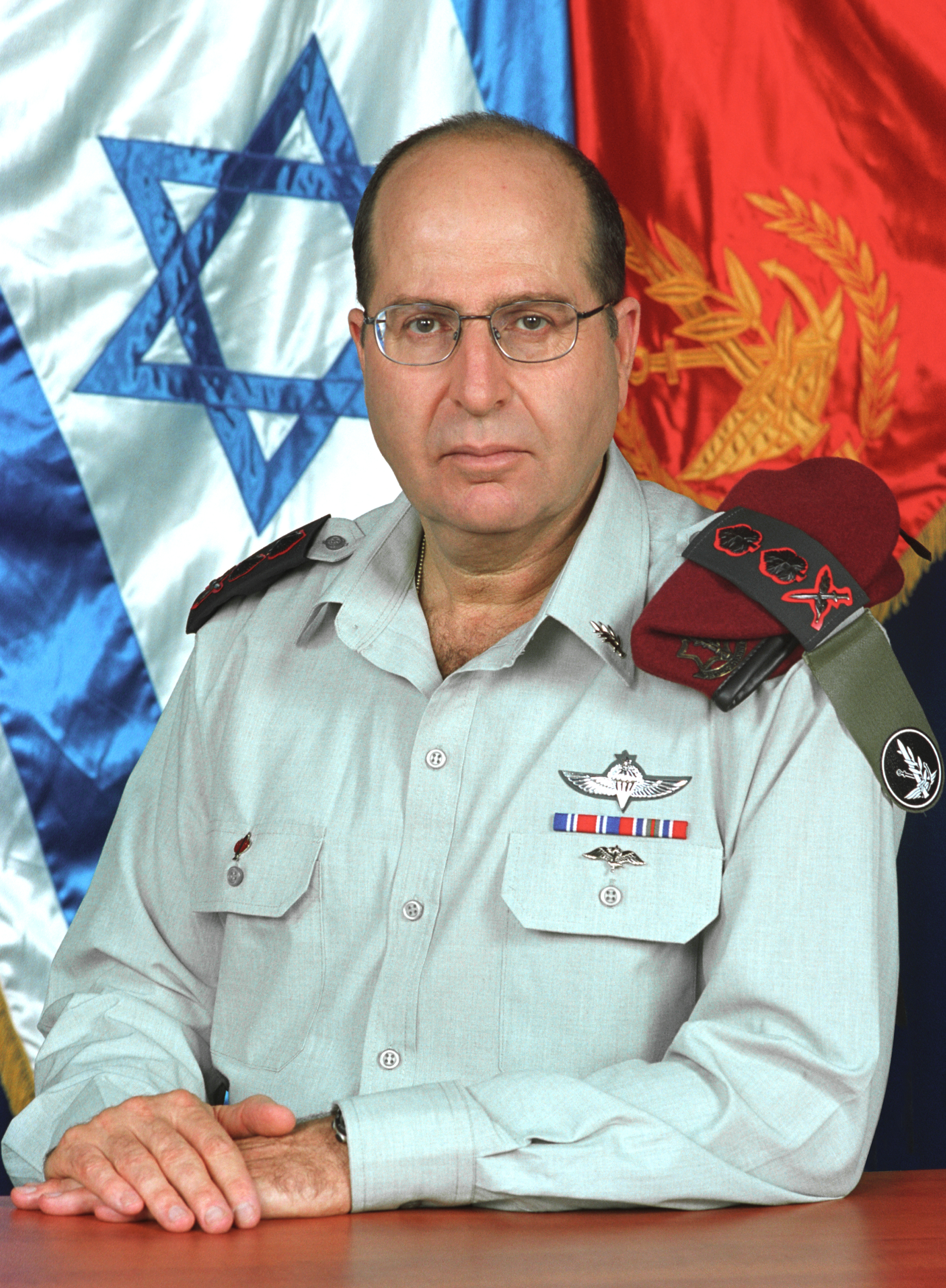
Moshe Ya'alon as Chief of the General Staff

In 1968, Ya'alon was conscripted into the Israel Defense Forces, and volunteered as a paratrooper in the Paratroopers Brigade. He served as a soldier and a squad leader in the brigade's 50 battalion and fought in the War of Attrition. He was discharged in 1971.

In 1973, he was called up as a reservist during the Yom Kippur War. On 15 October 1973, his unit, the 55th Paratroopers Brigade, became the first IDF unit to cross the Suez Canal into mainland Egypt. He continued fighting as part of the Israeli drive into the Egyptian mainland; he participated in the encirclement of the Egyptian Third Army. Following the war, he rejoined the IDF as a career soldier, and became an infantry officer after completing Officer Candidate School. He then returned to the Paratroopers Brigade as a platoon leader. Later on he served as a company commander in the brigade's 50 battalion and led the brigade's Reconnaissance company in several special operations and during Operation Litani.

During the 1982 Lebanon War, Ya'alon joined the Sayeret Matkal commando unit as a commander. He then rejoined the Paratroopers Brigade and was appointed as the commander of its 890 "Efe" (Echis) paratroop battalion. During this time, he was wounded in the leg while leading a pursuit of Hezbollah fighters in Lebanon.

Ya'alon took a sabbatical to the United Kingdom to study at the British Army's Camberley Staff College. Upon his return to Israel, he was promoted to the rank of colonel and appointed commander of Sayeret Matkal. Ya'alon led it to many notable achievements, for which the unit received four recommendations of honor. After his tenure as commander was finished, Ya'alon studied at the University of Haifa, obtaining a BA in Political Science, and took an Armored Corps course. In 1990, Ya'alon was appointed commander of the Paratroopers Brigade, and two years later, became commander of the Judea and Samaria Division. On 10 December 1992, Ya'alon killed a militant from the Islamic Jihad Movement in Palestine with a hand grenade after the militant had shot dead a Yamam operative attempting to arrest him. In 1993, he was appointed commander of an IDF training base, and commander of an armored division. In 1995, Ya'alon was promoted to major general and appointed head of Military Intelligence. In 1998, he was appointed commanding officer of Israel's Central Command. He was serving in this position when the Second Intifada was launched in September 2000.

Ya'alon was appointed Chief of the General Staff of the Israel Defense Forces (IDF) on 9 July 2002, and served in that position until 1 June 2005. The major focus throughout his tenure as chief of the general staff was the army's effort to quell the Second Intifada. Under his watch, the IDF conducted Operation Defensive Shield.

In February 2005, Defense Minister Shaul Mofaz decided not to extend Ya'alon's service as chief of the general staff for another year. This marked the climax of tensions between Mofaz and Ya'alon, which had arisen partly through Ya'alon's objection to the Gaza disengagement plan. On 1 June 2005, Ya'alon retired from the army, and Dan Halutz, his successor as chief of the general staff, oversaw the disengagement.

In December 2005, relatives of the victims of the 1996 shelling of Qana filed a suit against Ya'alon in Washington, D.C., for his alleged role in their deaths. In late 2006, while Ya'alon was in New Zealand on a private fund-raising trip for the Jewish National Fund, Auckland District Court judge Avinash Deobhakta issued a warrant for his arrest for alleged war crimes arising from his role in the 2002 assassination of Hamas commander Salah Shehade, who was killed in a targeted assassination, when an Israeli warplane bombed his home in Gaza City. About 14 Palestinian civilians were also killed in the airstrike. Deobhakta stated that New Zealand had an obligation to prosecute him under the Geneva Convention. Attorney-General Michael Cullen ordered a stay in the warrant after advice from the Crown Law office that there was insufficient evidence to prosecute, and the warrant was cancelled after Ya'alon left New Zealand.

He was appointed Minister of Defense on 17 March 2013. During his tenure, the IDF conducted Operation Protective Edge. He resigned on 20 May 2016, citing "difficult disagreements on moral and professional matters" with prime minister Netanyahu and warning that "extreme and dangerous elements have taken over Israel and the Likud Party".

== Political career ==
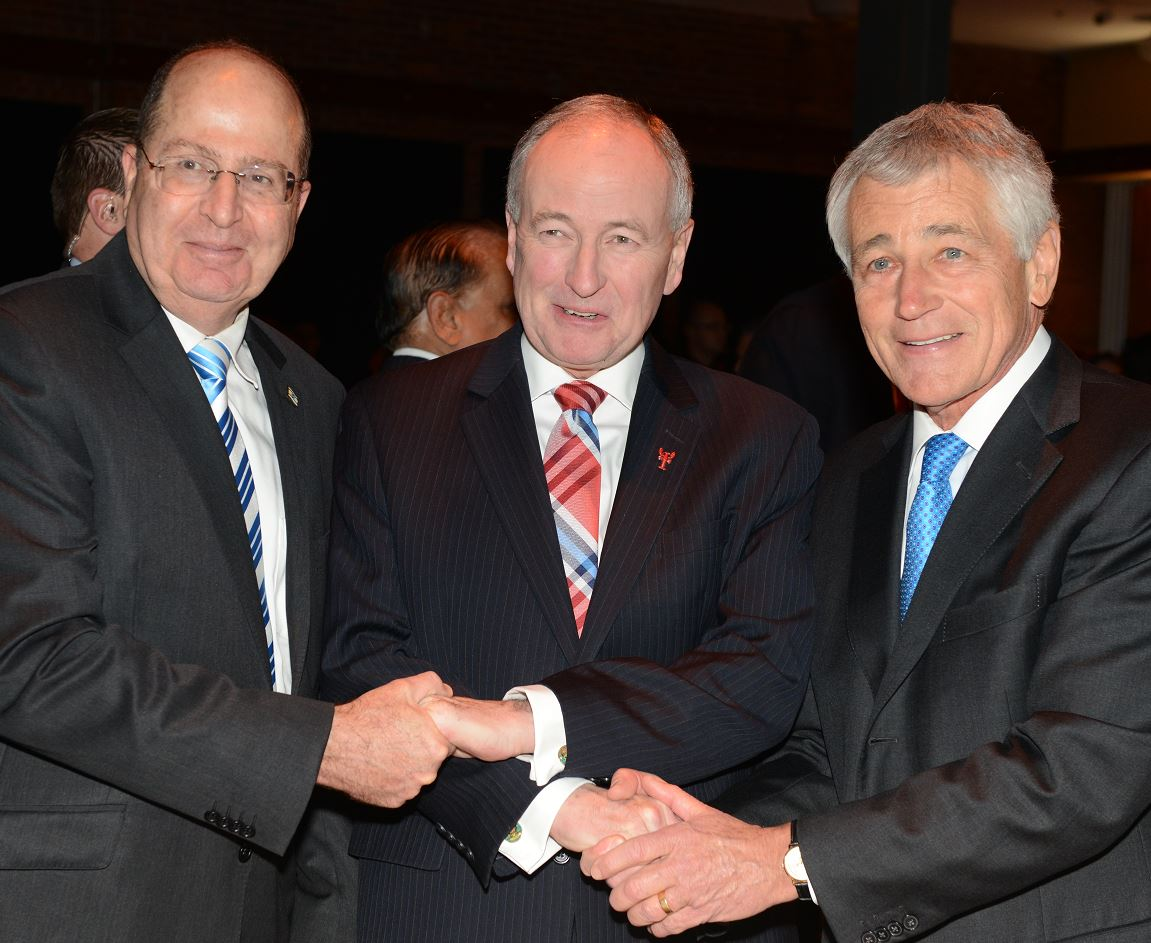
Ya'alon with Rob Nicholson, Canadian Minister of National Defence, and Chuck Hagel, US Secretary of Defense, at the Halifax International Security Forum 2013

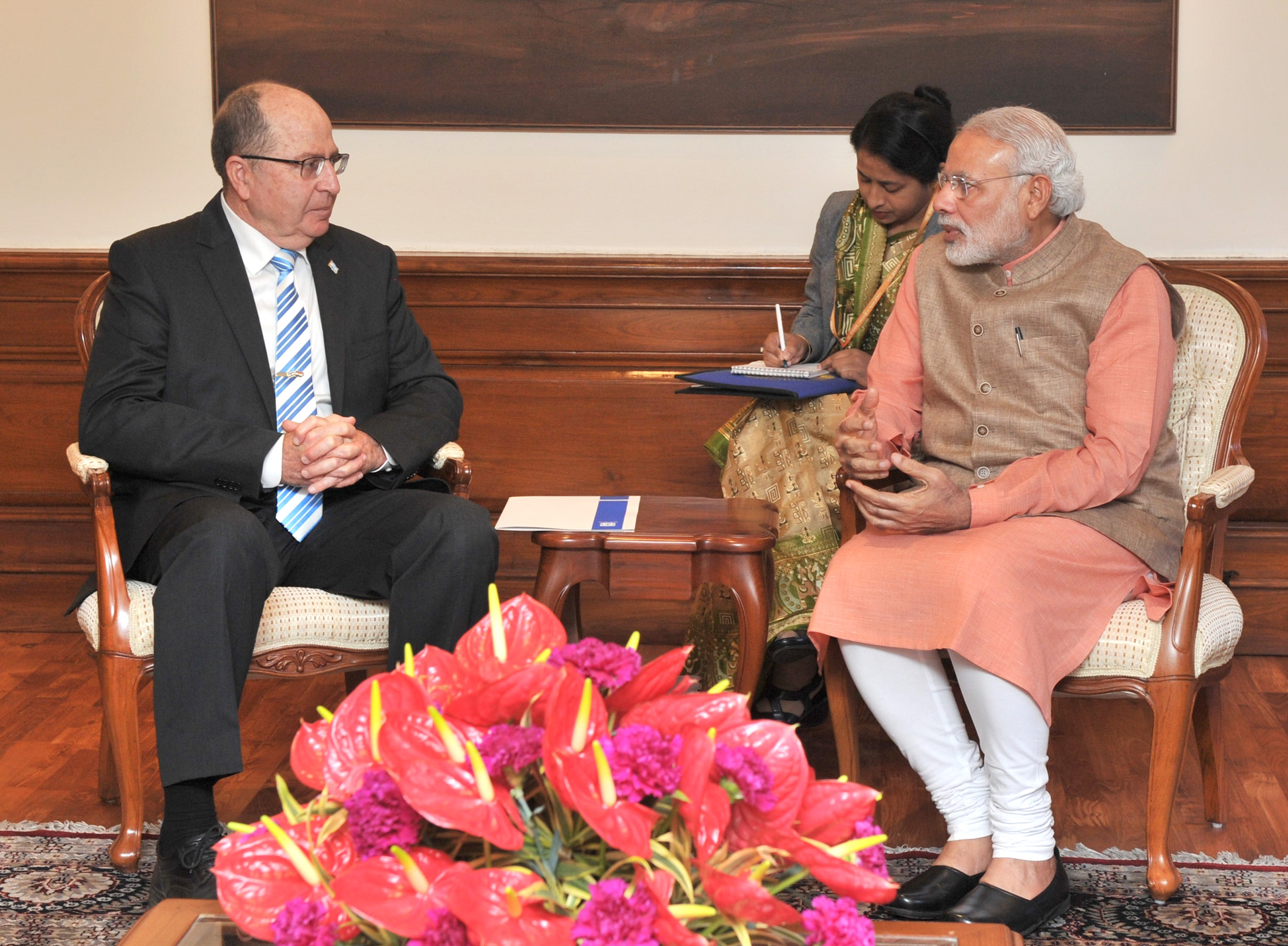
Ya'alon meeting with Indian Prime Minister Narendra Modi, 2015

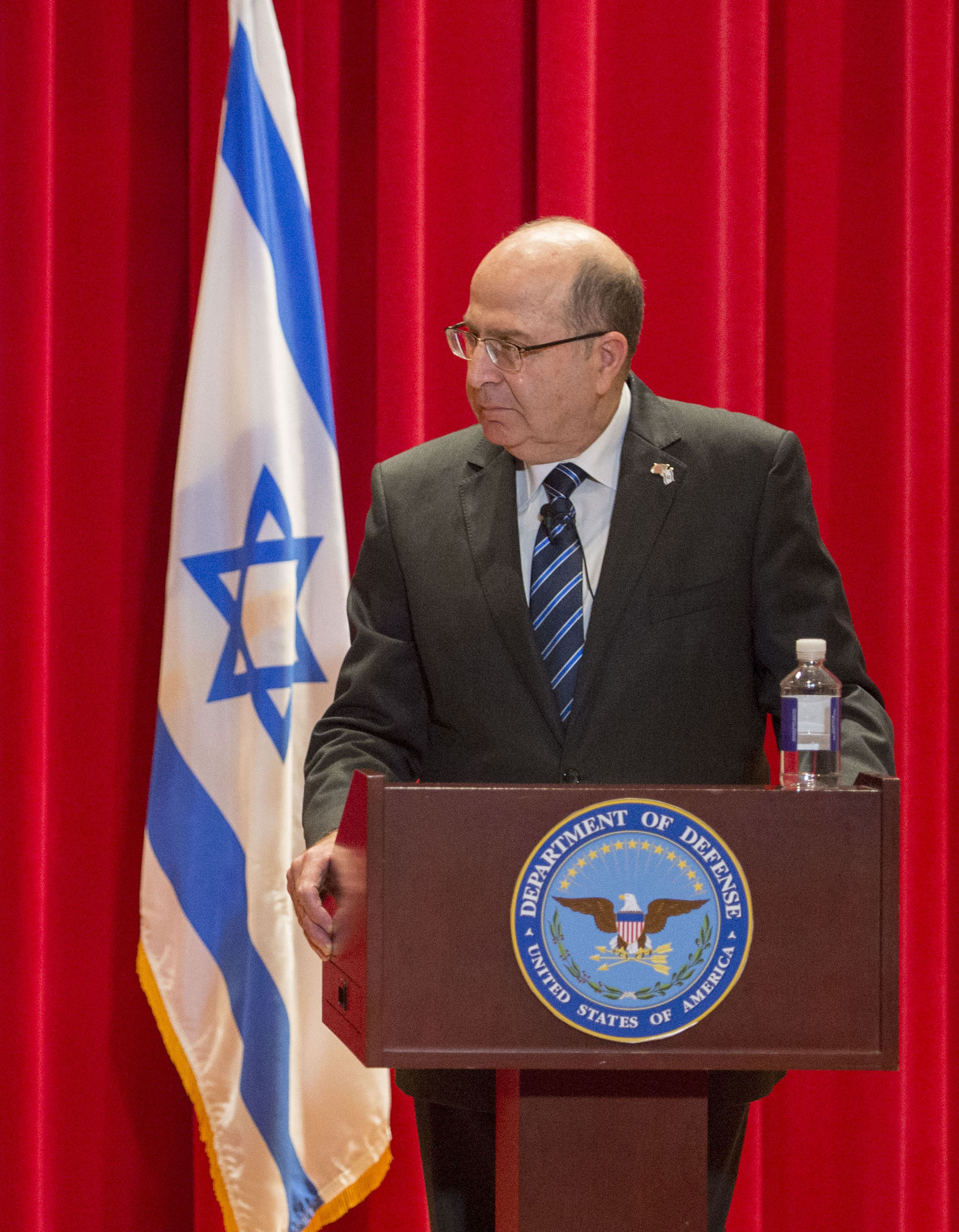
Israeli Minister of Defense Moshe Ya'alon speaks after meeting Ash Carter, 2015

Ya'alon backed the Oslo Accords, but later he "admitted his mistake." On 17 November 2008, Ya'alon announced that he was joining Likud and that he would participate in the primaries which would determine the Likud candidates for the 2009 elections. He won eighth place on the party's list, and entered the Knesset as Likud won 27 seats. Upon the formation of the Netanyahu government, he was appointed Vice Prime Minister (alongside Silvan Shalom) and Minister of Strategic Affairs. In March 2013, he replaced Ehud Barak as Defense Minister.

In January 2015, the leader of Lehava anti-assimilation group, Ben-Zion Gopstein, voiced harsh criticism against Ya'alon after Channel 2 reported that he was expected to categorize Lehava as a terrorist organization. Ya'alon ordered the Shin Bet and the Defense Ministry to assemble evidence required for the classification. Lehava promotes the ideology of the late Jewish Defense League leader Meir Kahane. Three members of Lehava were arrested and indicted in 2014 for committing arson and spray-painting anti-Arab graffiti at the Max Rayne Hand in Hand (Yad B'Yad) Bilingual School in Jerusalem and Lehava's leader Ben Zion Gopstein along with other group members were arrested shortly thereafter for incitement. The arson incident received international attention. Gopstein said "I suggest that [Ya'alon] aim to outlaw the Islamist Movement and then preoccupy itself with an anti-assimilation group... Instead of taking care of an enemy of Israel, the defense minister is trying to win over votes from the Left [by] taking on Lehava. The group acts to save the daughters of Israel [Jewish women] and deserves the Israel Prize."

In February 2015 Ya'alon took a political stand on gay marriage. In a speech he promised to help promote LGBT rights in Israel, and in particular noted he would support the establishment of civil marriage laws in Israel that would allow same-sex couples to be recognized as a family unit.

Following the 2016 shooting by an Israeli soldier of a wounded Palestinian assailant, Ya'alon said that the soldier's action "completely contradicts IDF values and its battle ethics; even in a moment of great anger we must not permit such unbridled and uncontrolled behavior." This statement was viewed by many Israelis as prejudging the case.

Ya'alon formed Telem on 2 January 2019.

On January 29, 2019, Ya'alon announced a political alliance with Benny Gantz, a former chief of the general staff. Ya'alon was in the number two position on Gantz's Israel Resilience Party list. Ya'alon reiterated his opposition to a "two states for two peoples" solution to the Israeli-Palestinian conflict. On 21 February 2019, the Israel Resilience Party and Telem merged with Yesh Atid. Ya'alon became the number three candidate on the united list, known as the "Blue and White" party. Following the party's split after the 2020 Israeli legislative election, Ya'alon's party aligned with Yair Lapid to form the Yesh Atid-Telem alliance and became second in the list.

In the run up to the 2021 Israeli legislative election, Ya'alon's party split from Yesh Atid. After multiple polls showing the party unable to pass the 3.25 percent election threshold, Ya'alon decided to quit the race.

In 2023, Ya'alon called the Israeli government a "dictatorship of criminals", due to the national security minister Itamar Ben Gvir calling on the police to "strike protestors" as well as proposed judicial reforms that would give the government more control over judicial appointments.

In 2024, Ya'alon accused the Israeli government of committing ethnic cleansings in the Gaza Strip, and said that the IDF is no longer the most moral army in the world.

== Controversial statements ==
=== Palestinian threat as 'cancer' ===
On 27 August 2002, Ya'alon told Haaretz: "The Palestinian threat harbors cancer-like attributes that have to be severed. There are all kinds of solutions to cancer. Some say it's necessary to amputate organs but at the moment I am applying chemotherapy."

In January 2004, Ya'alon publicly stated that the thirteen Sayeret Matkal soldiers who refused to serve in the Israeli-occupied territories were taking the unit's name in vain.

=== Iran ===
In January 2008, during a discussion at IDC Herzliya, Ya'alon said "There is no way to stabilize the situation all over the world and especially in the Middle East without confronting Iran." According to The Sydney Morning Herald Ya'alon said: "We have to confront the Iranian revolution immediately. There is no way to stabilize the Middle East today without defeating the Iranian [government]. The Iranian nuclear program must be stopped."

When asked whether "all options" included a military deposition of Mahmoud Ahmadinejad and the rest of Iran's current leadership, Ya'alon told The Herald: "We have to consider killing him. All options must be considered."

=== The peace now/'virus' incident ===
In August 2009, Ya'alon visited the ruins of Homesh, a settlement that was destroyed in Israeli disengagement from Gaza in 2005 and toured Israeli settlements in the north of the West Bank, considered as un-authorized outposts. He said that these communities are all legitimate and should not be called "illegal." In addition, he participated in a convention of Manhigut Yehudit ("Jewish Leadership"), the more right-wing Settlers' segment within the Likud right-wing Party, in which he condemned the disengagement plan, called Peace Now a "virus" and said that "We become accustomed to Arabs being permitted to live everywhere, in the Negev, Galilee, Nablus, Jenin, and [on the other hand] there are areas where Jews are not allowed to live. We caused this." He also stated that, "regarding the issue of the settlements, in my opinion Jews can and should live everywhere in the Land of Israel. Now, ... first of all, every settlement needs to get the approval of the authorities, and what goes up on the spot, in contradiction to these decisions and so on is not legitimate. It's against the law".

Later, after meeting with Netanyahu, Ya'alon retracted parts of his statements and said that he "recognized the importance of democratic discourse and respecting other opinions." Ya'alon explained that, indeed, all Israelis want peace, now. He stressed, however, the need to accept the fact that peace will not come immediately, otherwise it "hurts Israel." Ya'alon stated that, in his view, the way of thinking that Israel just needs to give one more piece of land and then it will have peace is a kind of "virus."

=== U.s. Secretary of State John Kerry and U.s. engagement in the peace process ===
In January 2014, Ya'alon was quoted in an Israeli newspaper calling U.S. Secretary of State John Kerry "obsessive" and "messianic," and claiming that the "only thing that can save us is if Kerry wins the Nobel Prize and leaves us alone." The remarks attributed to him precipitated a diplomatic row with the U.S. State Department and elicited criticism of members of Israel's government. In October 2014, during a visit to the U.S. Ya'alon met with his counterpart, Defense Secretary Chuck Hagel, but was denied requests to meet with then-Vice President Joe Biden and Kerry. A U.S. official told The Jerusalem Post that the snub should come as no surprise.

=== Segregation of buses ===
In October 2014, Ya'alon supported a plan that would effectively ban Palestinian workers from buses used by Jewish settlers. Ya'alon said that his plan was based on security needs. The IDF said that there was no security issue with integrated buses given that all West Bank Palestinian workers go through security checkpoints. When Ya'alon's move was criticized as being a form of apartheid, Yehuda Weinstein, Israel's Attorney General, demanded that Ya'alon explain his rationale.

=== Resumption of settlement construction ===
In late 2014 at a meeting with Jewish settlers on the West Bank who questioned Israel's apparent delay in settler construction, Ya'alon said that settlement construction represented the greatest growth in Israel and with regard to any apparent slowdown, he declared, "It's temporary. There is a certain administration now in the United States Obama administration, which is leading this policy. This administration will not stay forever and I hope it's temporary." He commented that it is important for Israel not to antagonize the U.S. at the moment, because American support is needed in countering diplomatic undertakings at the U.N. that he claimed were "anti-Israel." "The publication of construction plans, even in Jerusalem, draws a response from various bodies, including our friends, that attack us," he said. But he noted that he very much wanted to approve construction plans. Ya'alon's remarks about not antagonizing the U.S. came at a time when an opinion poll showed that the "overwhelming majority" of Israelis believe their country's relationship with the U.S. has been hurt as a result of the poor relationship between Obama and Netanyahu. In response to the Ya'alon's remarks, which were broadcast of Israeli Army Radio, a spokesperson for Ya'alon claimed, "this does not diminish in any way the appreciation and esteem Minister Ya'alon has for the contribution of the U.S. and its government to the security of Israel and the fact that the U.S. is Israel's best friend and strategic anchor." Responding to the latest of Ya'alon negative comments about the Obama administration, U.S. State Department spokeswoman Jen Psaki said, "This administration's opposition to settlements is fully consistent with the policies of administrations for decades, including of both parties. So the notion that that would change is not borne out by history."

=== Israel–Hamas war ===
In an interview on November 30, 2024, Ya'alon stated, "We are being dragged into annexation and ethnic cleansing in the Gaza Strip." When asked to clarify his use of the phrase "ethnic cleansing" and if he believed that was the direction the war was heading, Ya'alon replied, "Why say 'heading'? What's happening there right now? Beit Lahiya is gone, Beit Hanoun is gone. Operations are underway in Jabalya, essentially clearing the area of Arabs."

The next day Ya'alon reasserted his comments during multiple interviews. When speaking about the government during an interview, he stated: "At the end of the day, they're perpetrating war crimes."

=== Netanyahu-Qatar incident ===
On March 9, 2025, Ya'alon said in a radio interview on the Kan Bet channel hosted by Arieh Golan, that Prime Minister Benjamin Netanyahu received tens of millions of dollars from Qatar. Following the interview, Netanyahu filed a defamation lawsuit against Ya'alon on March 11, 2025, stating that Ya'alon's claims are false and constitute "Horrific, ugly, malicious and baseless lies". In the lawsuit, Netanyahu is seeking 160,000 NIS in damages.

In response to the lawsuit, Ya'alon posted on his X account that "I hear that Hamas's financier intends to sue me. Bring it on! Maybe this will be an opportunity for him to explain the suitcases of cash sent from Qatar to Hamas. Maybe he can address the fact that three of his closest aides were funded by Qatar".

== Personal life ==
Ya'alon is married with three children. He and his wife live in Modi'in-Maccabim-Re'ut.

== See also ==
- Media coverage of the Arab–Israeli conflict

== Bibliography ==
- "The IDF and the Israeli Spirit", by Moshe Ya'alon, Azure magazine, Spring 2006, no. 24
- "Israel and the Palestinians: A New Strategy" by Moshe Ya'alon, Azure magazine, Autumn 2008, no. 34
- "A New Strategy for the Israeli-Palestinian Conflict", by Moshe Ya'alon, Jerusalem Center for Public Affairs, Vol. 8, No. 10, 2 September 2008
