= Telem (2019 political party) =

Israeli political party

Telem תל״ם
- Leader: Moshe Ya'alon
- Founded: 2 January 2019
- Split from: Likud
- Ideology: Liberal Zionism; Economic liberalism; National liberalism; Conservative liberalism
- Political position: Centre to centre-right
- National affiliation: Blue & White (2019–2020)
- Colours: Dark blue
- Slogan: Choosing responsibility
- Most MKs: 5

Website
- www.telem-il.org

Telem (Hebrew: תל״ם, an acronym for Tnua Leumit Mamlakhtit, lit. 'National Statesman-like Movement') was a centrist to centre-right political party in Israel. The party was formed by former Defense Minister Moshe Ya'alon and registered on 2 January 2019 in order to contest the April 2019 Knesset elections. It subsequently joined the Blue & White alliance. Yesh Atid and the party left the alliance on 29 March 2020 after Blue and White joined the government and instead formed an independent faction in the Knesset called Yesh Atid-Telem. Telem left the short lived alliance with Yesh Atid soon after. The party dropped out of the 2021 Knesset elections on 1 February 2021.

== History ==
In the wake of conflicts with Prime Minister Benjamin Netanyahu over the Hebron shooting incident and Yisrael Beiteinu joining Netanyahu's coalition, Moshe Ya'alon left his defense minister post in May 2016 "amidst wide-spread speculation that he would be fired by Netanyahu". On 12 March 2017, Ya'alon officially relinquished his membership of Likud, announcing that he will form a new party to challenge Netanyahu in the upcoming 2019 election. Ya'alon said "he was a soldier for Israel for decades, and he would continue to serve the public in his new party".

The party was named in remembrance of former Defense Minister Moshe Dayan and his party, Telem, and registered on 2 January 2019 in order to contest the April 2019 Knesset elections.

In advance of the April 2019 Knesset elections, Telem merged with the Israel Resilience Party and Yesh Atid. Ya'alon was positioned third on the new united list, known as the Blue & White alliance. The party received five seats in the April 2019 Knesset elections, out of 35 seats that the entire alliance received. In the subsequent September 2019 Knesset elections, the party ran again as part of the Blue & White alliance and retained their five seats out of the 33 seats that the entire alliance received.

Yesh Atid and the party left the alliance on 29 March 2020 following the 2020 Israeli legislative election after the Israel Resilience Party (keeping the alliance name Blue and White) joined the government, while the two former Blue and White factions formed an independent faction in the Knesset called Yesh Atid-Telem.

Yesh Atid-Telem split in January 2021, in advance of the 2021 Knesset elections, though Ya'alon and his party dropped out of the race on 1 February.

== Party goals ==
Original logo introduced in 2019

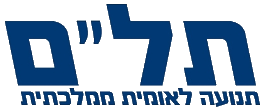
Alternative logo introduced in late 2019

The party's goals as laid out by its registration papers are:

- Strengthening and fortifying the State of Israel in the Land of Israel as a Jewish, democratic, secure, prosperous and moral state, while fostering Jewish-Zionist education and values and electing honest leadership committed to the welfare of the State and its citizens irrespective of religion, race, sex or gender.
- Ensuring the sovereignty and security of the State of Israel and the security of all its citizens. The party will strive to achieve true peace between the State of Israel and its neighbors.
- Supporting a free and open economy.
- Working to improve the development of the state's infrastructure and services and the welfare of the country's citizens and to reduce bureaucracy and regulation for the welfare of the citizens of Israel in all areas of life: health, education, housing, transportation, national infrastructure, settlement, agriculture, welfare, personal security and industry.
- Acting to redetermine national priorities in planning and financing, while maximizing the utilization of national resources and working to meet goals.
- Cultivating culture and sports in an egalitarian and representative manner, giving priority to the allocation of resources and investment in populations with disabilities, elderly and the youth.

The party emphasized increasing settlement in Israel's disputed areas. During a visit to the West Bank settlement Leshem, The party's leader Moshe Ya'alon said: "It is our right to settle in the entire land of Israel". Zvi Hauser, one of the party's former MKs, was the head of the Israeli Golan Coalition, an organisation which works for increasing Jewish settlement in the Golan Heights.

== Leaders ==
Leader	Took office	Left office
Moshe Ya'alon	2019	Incumbent

== Election results ==
Election	Leader	Votes	%	Seats	+/–	Status
April 2019	Moshe Ya'alon	Part of Blue and White		5 / 120	Steady	Snap election
September 2019	Moshe Ya'alon	Part of Blue and White		5 / 120	Steady	Snap election
2020	Moshe Ya'alon	Part of Blue and White		5 / 120	Steady	Opposition
2021	Moshe Ya'alon	Did not contest				Extraparliamentary
2022	Moshe Ya'alon	Did not contest				Extraparliamentary

== Knesset members ==
Knesset term	Members	Total
2019	5	Moshe Ya'alon, Yoaz Hendel, Zvi Hauser, Orly Fruman, Gadi Yevarkan
2019–2020	5	Moshe Ya'alon, Yoaz Hendel, Zvi Hauser, Orly Fruman, Gadi Yevarkan (until 15 January 2020)
2020	5	Moshe Ya'alon, Yoaz Hendel, Zvi Hauser, Orly Fruman, Andrey Kozhinov
2020-2021	3	Moshe Ya'alon, Orly Fruman, Andrey Kozhinov
