= Ofer Shelah =

Israeli journalist and politician

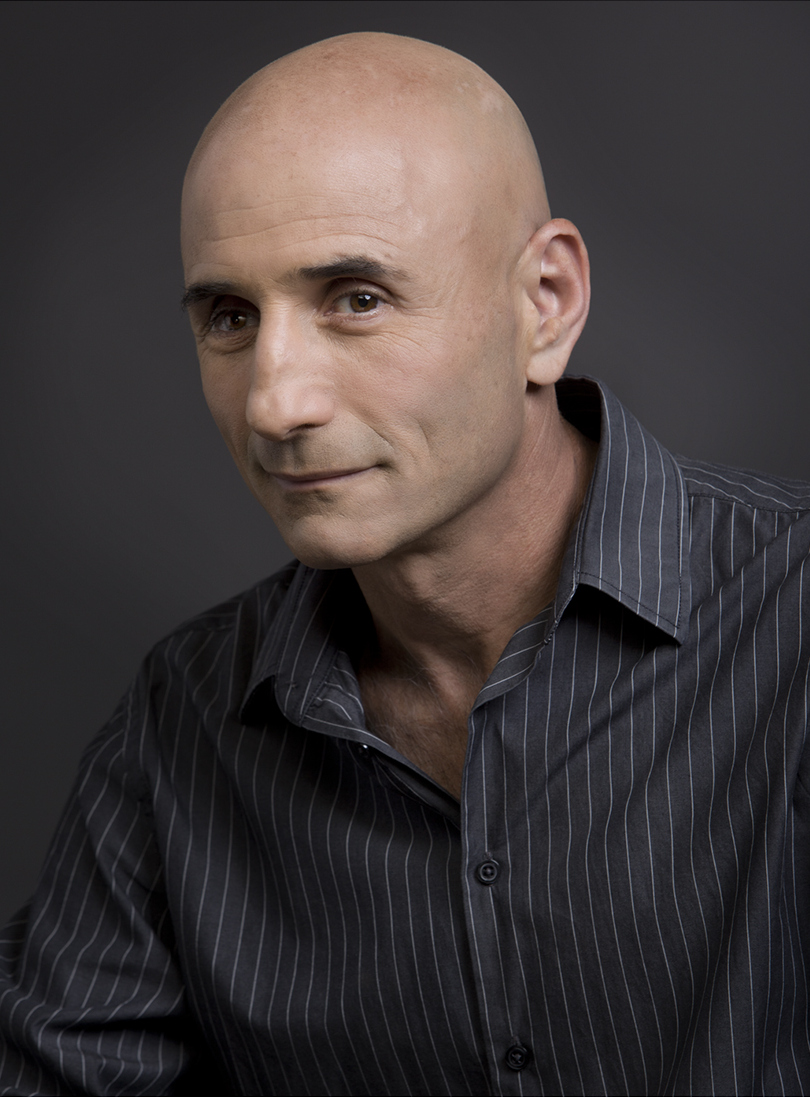
- Shelah in 2012

Faction represented in the Knesset
- 2013–2019: Yesh Atid
- 2019–2020: Blue and White
- 2020: Yesh Atid

Personal details
- Born: 9 February 1960 (age 66) Kiryat Bialik, Israel

Ofer Shelah (Hebrew: עֹפֶר שֶׁלַח; born 9 February 1960) is an Israeli journalist and politician. He served as a member of the Knesset for Yesh Atid from 2013 until 2020.

== Early life and military service ==
Shelah was born in Kiryat Bialik. He enlisted in the Israel Defense Forces in 1977 as a soldier in the Paratroopers Brigade, and in 1979 became an officer. He served as a platoon leader and as an executive officer in the paratroopers, and took part in various raids against PLO camps in Lebanon. After he was honourably discharged he fought as a platoon leader and as company commander in the reserve Paratroopers Brigade in the 1982 Lebanon War and lost an eye in Lebanon in 1983. He later published a book about his experiences, Guf Sheni (Hebrew: Second Person; lit. second body).

== Education ==
Shelah subsequently completed a BA in Economics and English Literature at Tel Aviv University and an MA in Literature and Creative Writing at New York University.

== Career ==
He started working as a journalist for Maariv and then for Yedioth Ahronoth.

== Political career ==
Prior to the 2013 Knesset elections, Shelah joined the new Yesh Atid party, and was placed sixth on its list. He was elected to the Knesset as the party won 19 seats. During his first time, he was a member of the Foreign Affairs and Defence Committee. In a 2013 speech at an event for Molad: The Center for the Renewal of Israeli Democracy, Shelah called Israeli settlements in the West Bank a key obstacle to resolving the Israeli–Palestinian conflict, saying that "The settlements are an obstacle that just keeps growing. Israel is rapidly reaching the status of a South Africa." Shelah added that "the occupation corrupts Israeli society, the IDF, Israeli justice, Israeli media, Israeli psyche and Israeli mode of speech." He was placed sixth on the party's list for the 2015 elections, and was re-elected as the party won 11 seats.

In 2020, Shelah was elected head of the State Audit Committee. He also heads a special Knesset committee on the COVID-19 pandemic in Israel. He has criticized Prime Minister Benjamin Netanyahu for his handling of the virus and has called him "morally rotten." He has also pressed for a state comptroller investigation into the submarine graft scandal (Case 3000). Shelah also condemned Netanyahu for suggesting that the majority Israeli Arab Joint List is illegitimate and should not be countered in determining the next government, likening Netanyahu's stance to Kahanism and calling it "an official declaration of war on the Jewish and democratic state." Shelah also criticized Netanyahu's coalition partner and Alternate Prime Minister, Benny Gantz, as "weak" and "simply Netanyahu's clerk," pointing to Gantz's lack of input in the government's West Bank annexation plans.

Tnufa party logo

In December 2020, Shelah announced that he would leave Yesh Atid to establish his own political party, which was named Tnufa (Momentum). However, the party pulled out of the election race on 4 February 2021 amid failed talks to run alongside the Israeli Labor Party.

== Personal life ==
Shelah lives in Moshav Ginaton, and is widowed with two children.
