= Anat Guetta =

Israeli economist

- ענת גואטה
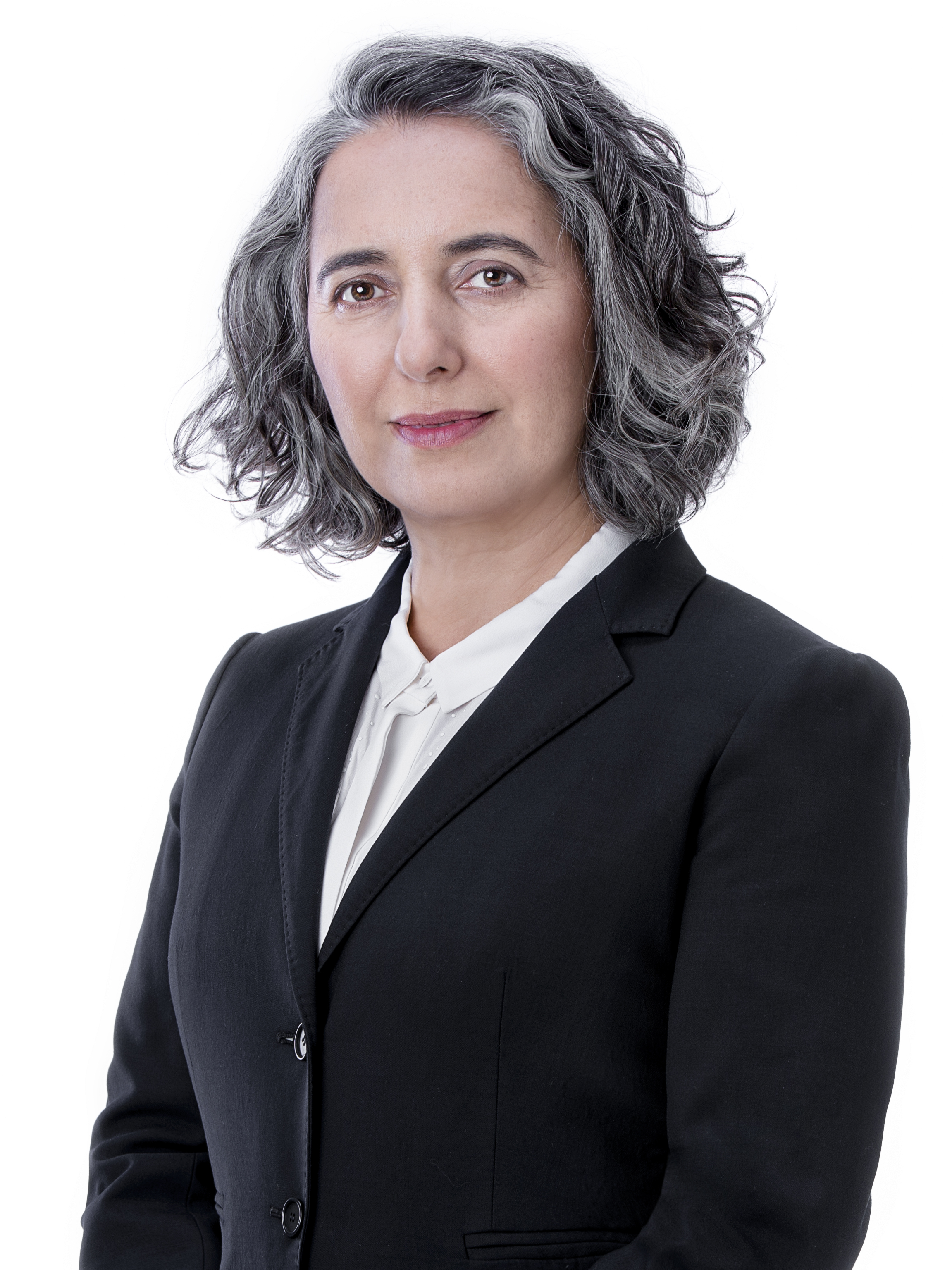

Chair of the Israel Securities Authority
- Incumbent
- Assumed office 2018
- Preceded by: Shmuel Hauser

Personal details
- Born: 1967 (age 58–59)
- Education: Bar-Ilan University (B.A.); Netanya Academic College (M.A.)
- Profession: Economist

Anat Guetta (Hebrew: ענת גואטה; born 1967) is an Israeli economist and public official. Since 2018, she has served as chair of the Israel Securities Authority (ISA).

== Education ==
In 1993, Guetta received a bachelor's degree in political science and economics from Bar-Ilan University in 1993. She received a master's degree in business administration with a specialty in finance from the Netanya Academic College in 2005.

== Career ==
From 1993 to 2005, Guetta worked at Bank-Mizrahi-Tefahot in various positions. As an economist in the bank's business division, Guetta worked in the field of credit derivatives and sales to institutional investors, as well as complex financing transactions.

In 2005, Guetta became the first general manager of Elco Ltd., serving in the position until 2008. In December 2010, Guetta became a partner at the newly-established Entropy Economic Research Services. The firm advises institutional investors on corporate governance and capital market activities. From its founding in 2010 until August 2017, Guetta also served as the company's general manager.

=== Israel Securities Authority (ISA) ===
After Shmuel Hauser announced his decision to resign as chair of the Israel Securities Authority (ISA), Guetta was chosen by Minister of Finance Moshe Kahlon to succeed him.
