= Bar-Ilan University =

Public research university in Ramat Gan, Israel

- אוניברסיטת בר-אילן (Hebrew)
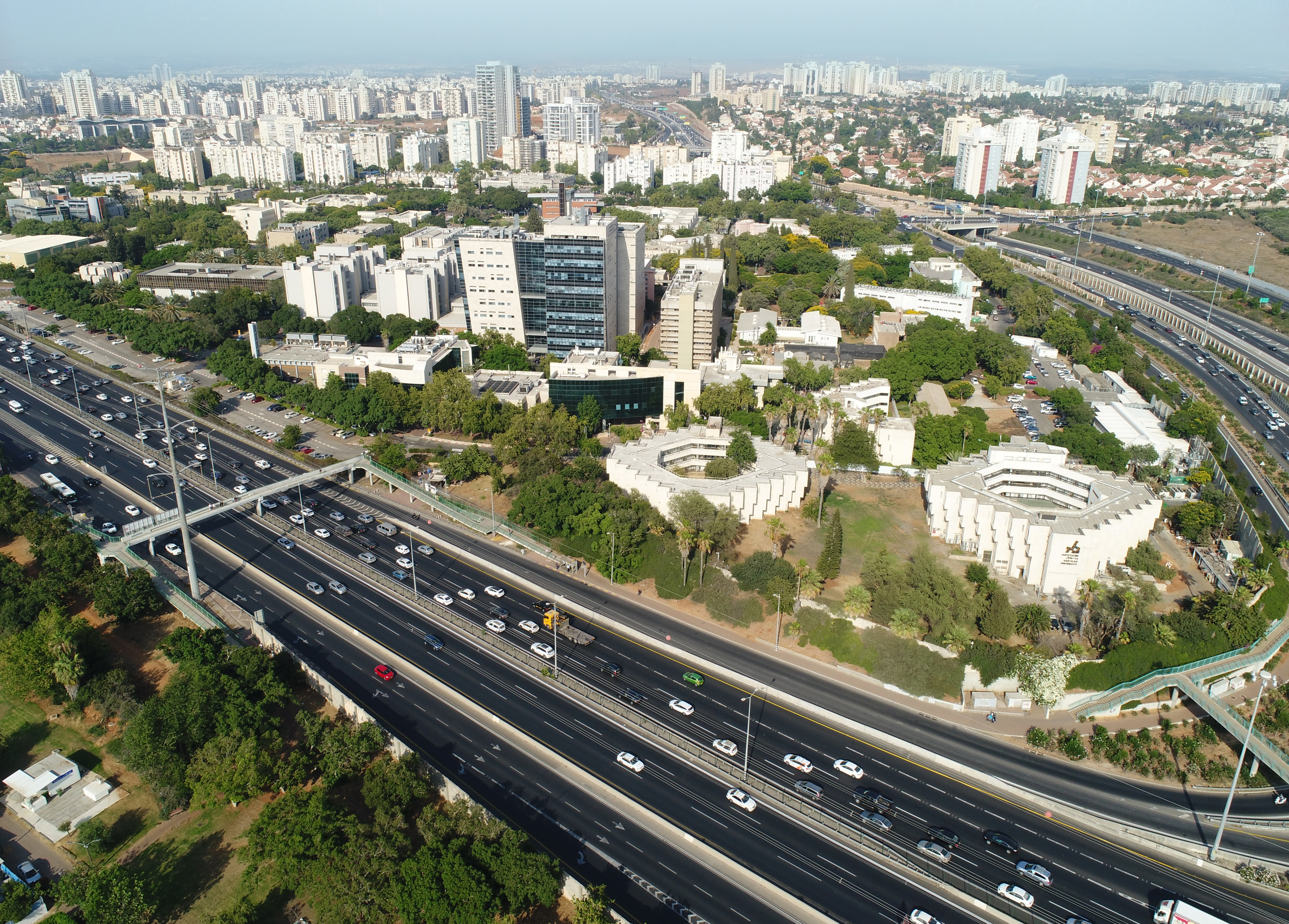
- Aerial view of Bar-Ilan University
- Other name: BIU
- Motto: Impacting tomorrow, today
- Type: Public research
- Established: 1955
- President: Arie Zaban
- Rector: Amnon Albeck
- Principal: Zohar Yinon
- Administrative staff: 1,250
- Students: 20,000
- Doctoral students: 2,200+
- Location: Ramat Gan, Tel Aviv District, Israel; 32°4′4″N 34°50′33″E
- Campus: Urban
- Colors: Dark green and sky blue
- Website: www.biu.ac.il

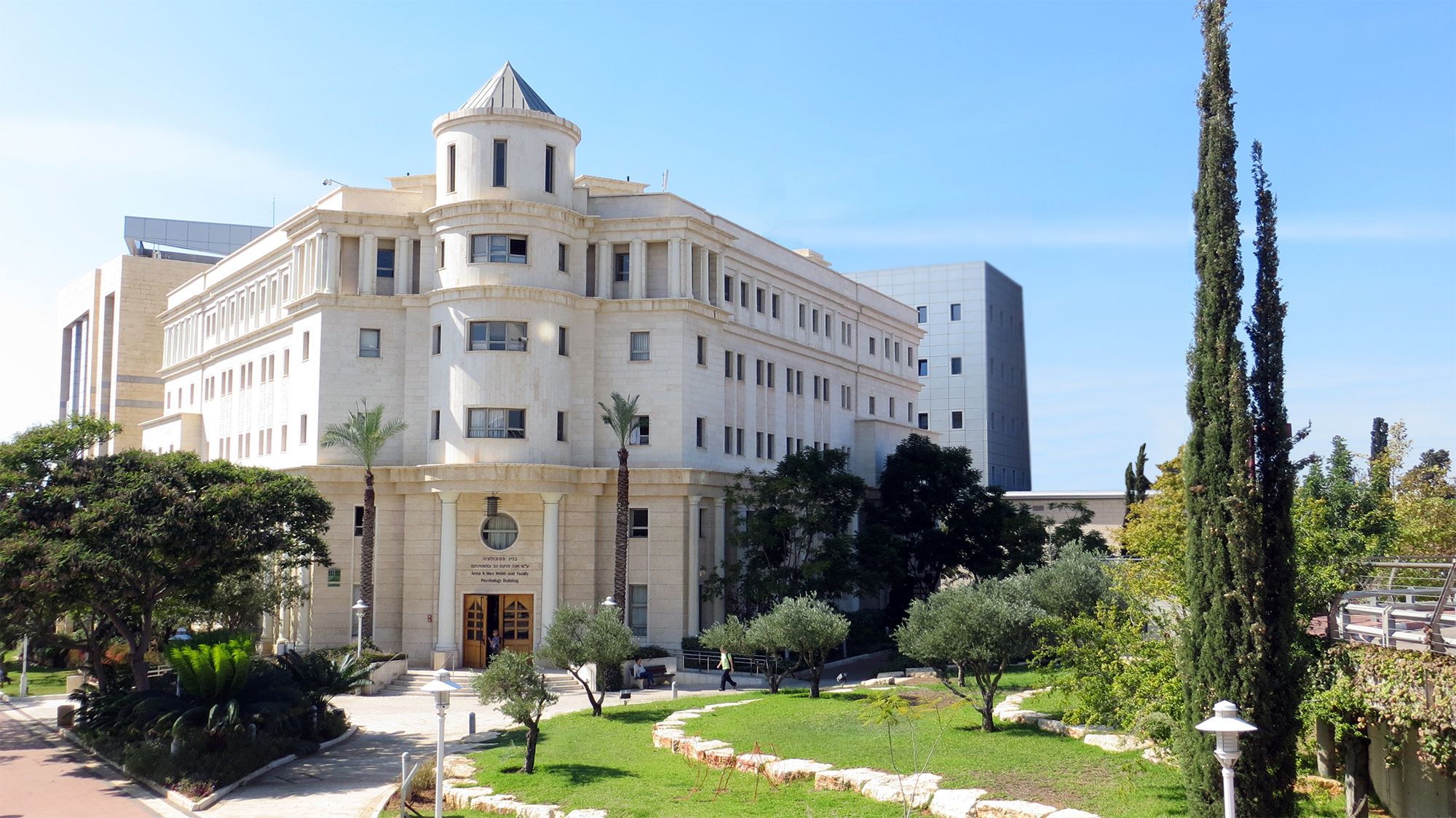
Anna & Max Webb and Family Psychology Building at the Bar-Ilan University, Ramat-Gan, Israel

Bar-Ilan University (BIU, Hebrew: אוניברסיטת בר-אילן, Universitat Bar-Ilan) is a public research university in the Tel Aviv District city of Ramat Gan, Israel. Established in 1955, Bar Ilan is Israel's second-largest academic university institution. It has 20,000 students and 1,350 faculty members.

Bar-Ilan's mission is to "blend Jewish tradition with modern technologies and scholarship and the university endeavors to ... teach the Jewish heritage to all its students while providing [an] academic education." The university is among the best in the Middle East in the fields of computer science, engineering, engineering physics and applied physics. In 2024, the university received a donation of $260 million, one of the biggest donations to a university in Israeli history, for investment in science. The donor wished to remain anonymous.

== History ==
Bar-Ilan University has Jewish-American roots; it was conceived in Atlanta in a meeting of the American Mizrahi organization in 1950, and was founded by Professor Pinkhos Churgin, an American Orthodox rabbi and educator, who was president from 1955 to 1957 where he was succeeded by Joseph H. Lookstein who was president from 1957 to 1967. When it was opened in 1955, it was described by The New York Times "as Cultural Link Between the [Israeli] Republic and America". Presidents who followed were Max Jammer (1967–77), Emanuel Rackman (1977–86), Michael Albeck (1986–89), Ernest Krausz (1989), Zvi Arad (1989–92), and Shlomo Eckstein (1992–96).

The university was named for Rabbi Meir Bar-Ilan (né Meir Berlin), a Religious Zionist leader who served as the inspiration for its establishment. Although he was trained in Orthodox seminaries in Berlin, he believed there was a need for an institution providing a dual curriculum of secular academic studies and religious Torah studies.

BIU's student population is diverse and includes both Jewish and non-Jewish students.

Jewish students must take at least five courses in Jewish studies in order to graduate; non-Jewish students can choose general courses instead. These are available as academic Jewish studies courses, as well as through more traditional Torah study, offered primarily by the Machon HaGavoah LeTorah, established in the 1970s. The "Machon" operates a Kollel / Bet midrash for men, and a Midrasha for women. The Kollel offers traditional yeshiva studies with an emphasis on Talmud and Halakha (Jewish law), while the midrasha offers courses in "Tanakh" (The Bible), practical Halakha, and Machshavah (Jewish philosophy). The Midrasha is the largest in Israel. These programs are open to all students free of charge.

Yitzhak Rabin's convicted assassin, Yigal Amir, was a student of law and computer science at Bar-Ilan, prompting charges that the university had become a hotbed of political extremism. One of the steps taken by the university following the 1995 assassination was to encourage dialogue between left-wing and right-wing students.

Bar-Ilan's Faculty of Law made headlines in 2008 by achieving the highest average Israeli bar exam grade of 81.9 by its graduates.

Under university President Moshe Kaveh (1996–2013), Bar-Ilan underwent a major expansion, with new buildings added on the northern side of the campus. New science programs have been introduced, including a multidisciplinary brain research center and a center for nanotechnology. The university has placed archaeology as one of its priorities, and this includes excavations such as the Tell es-Safi/Gath archaeological excavations and the recently opened Bar-Ilan University/Weizmann Institute of Science joint program in Archaeological Sciences.

In 2011, during President Kaveh's term, Bar-Ilan University opened the Azrieli Faculty of Medicine in Zefat in Northern Israel. The Israeli Government awarded Bar Ilan the tender to open Israel's 5th medical school and the first in the Galilee region in order to address the shortage of physicians and improve health care to its population.

Daniel Hershkowitz was university President from 2013 to 2017.

Arie Zaban was elected as the President of the university in 2017.

In June 2024, the university received a $260 million donation from the estate of an anonymous American donor, the largest bequest in the university's history and the second largest ever to an Israeli university. The donation is earmarked for science and technology, specifically to recruit researchers, build laboratories, and create partnerships.

In June 2025, the Israel National Institute for Energy Storage was established at the university at a dedicated energy complex, at the direction of the Ministry of Energy and Infrastructure, in academic collaboration with the Technion – Israel Institute of Technology.

Bar-Ilan's first graduation ceremony in 1959

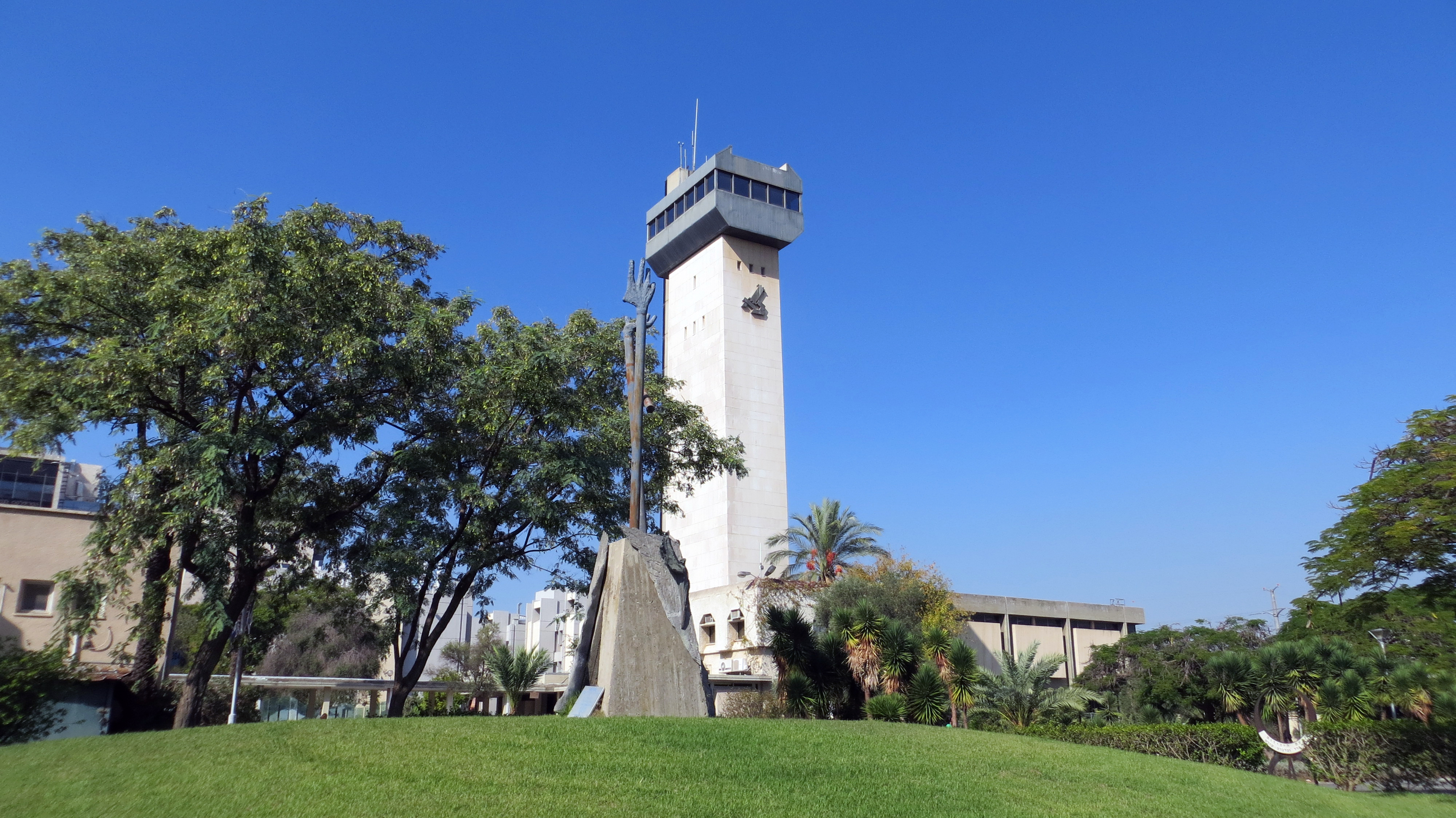
Wengrowsky Family Lookout and Visitors' Center a.k.a. Lev HaCampus (lit. heart of the campus)

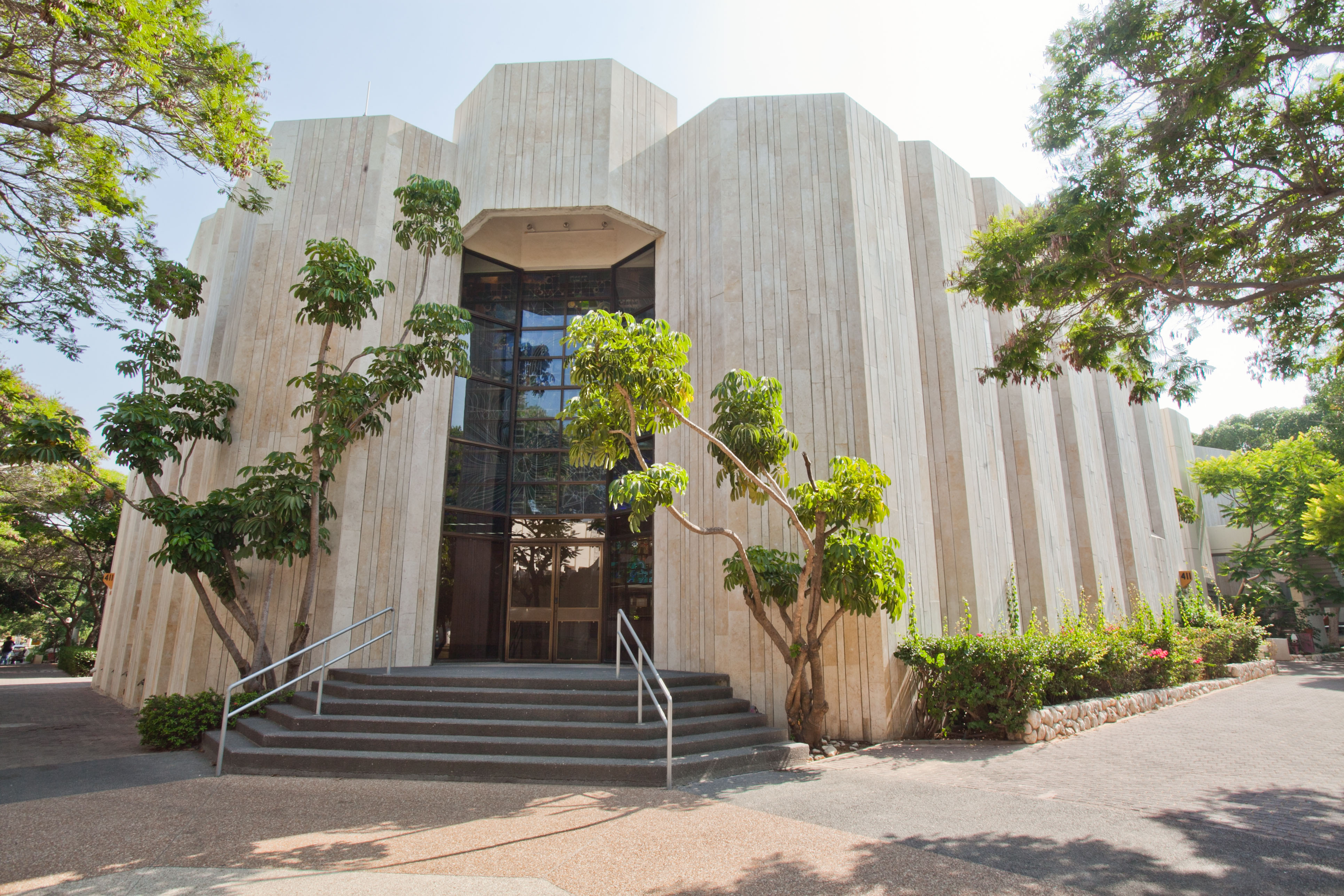
HaMachon HaGavoah LeTorah campus bet midrash and midrasha

== Academics ==
Bar-Ilan University has nine faculties: Exact Sciences, Life Sciences, Social Sciences, Education, Humanities, Jewish Studies, Medicine, Engineering, and Law. There is also a special Unit of Interdisciplinary Studies. At the undergraduate level, as mentioned, ten courses in Jewish studies related subjects are required from all students.

Bar-Ilan offers several special programs, including its international B.A. program, taught entirely in English, and is the first university in Israel to offer a full undergraduate program taught entirely in English. Currently, students can choose between a B.A. degree in interdisciplinary social sciences, where students can choose between a macro track in economics, political sciences, and sociology, or the Micro Track in Criminology, Psychology, and Sociology, or a major in communications, with a minor in either English literature or political science. The degrees are internationally recognized, and are open to students from all over the world.

In addition, Bar-Ilan offers a preparatory program that readies new immigrants for Israeli colleges. The university also runs a one-year overseas program called Torah Im Derech Eretz Program, which combines traditional Kollel Torah studies in the morning, separate for men and women, as well as co-ed general university studies and Jewish history classes in the afternoon. Many American students enrolled in regular programs of study in the university also take these Jewish history classes to fulfill their Jewish studies requirements.

Bar-Ilan also houses several research institutions, such as the above-mentioned Gonda Multidisciplinary Brain Research Center, focused on neuroscience, which may have their own requirements.

== Awards and recognition ==
University rankings

Global – Overall
- ARWU World: 401–500 (2024)
- QS World: =660 (2025)
- THE World: 601–800 (2025)
- USNWR Global: 802 (2025)

The Bar Ilan Responsa Project was awarded the Israel Prize in 2007. The university's Bible project, in danger of being eliminated by continued budget cuts, was saved at the last minute by an anonymous donor.

In its capacity as a business school, Bar-Ilan was placed as the fourth best business school in Africa and the Middle East in the 2010 QS Global 200 Business Schools Report.

== Notable alumni ==
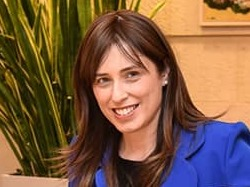
Tzipi Hotovely

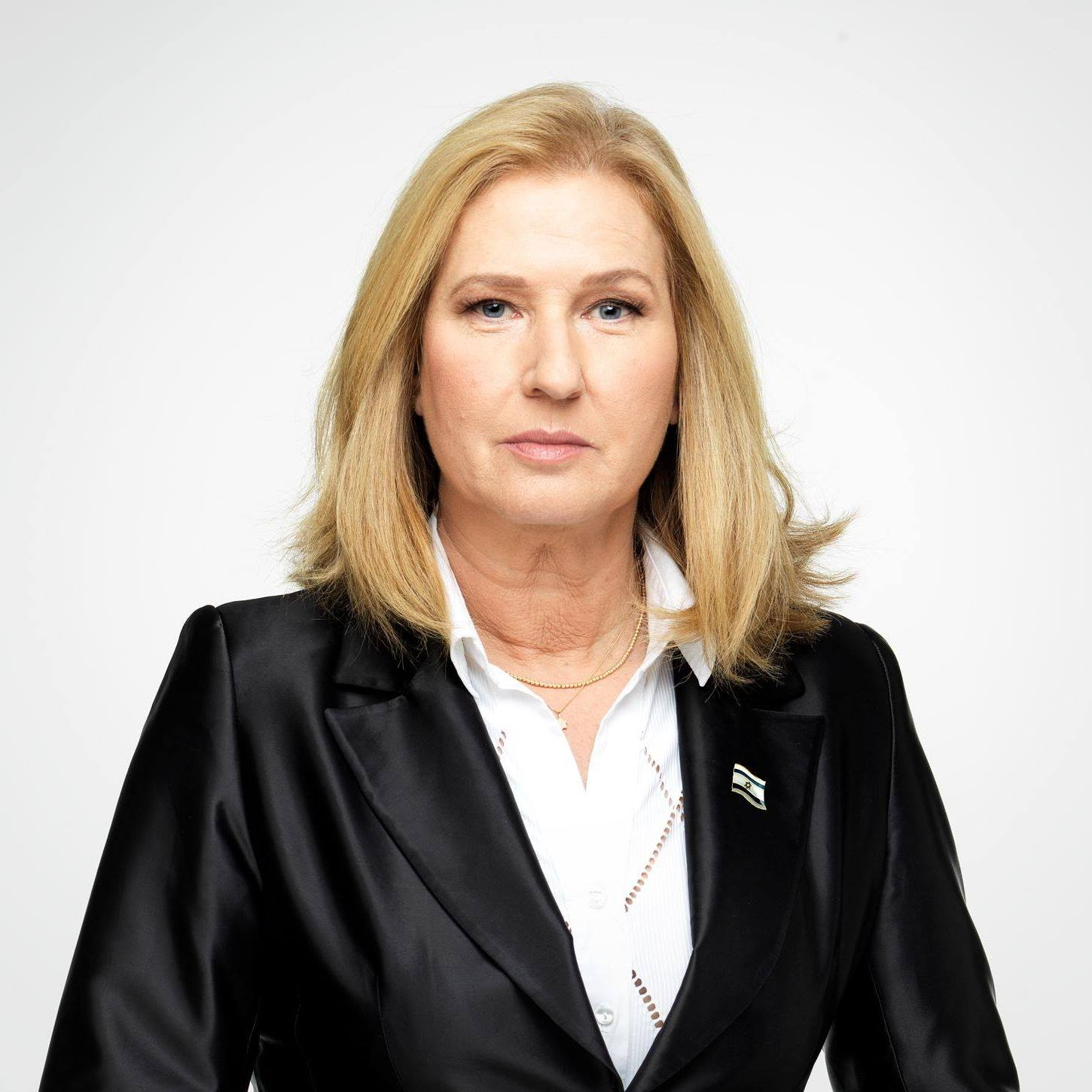
Tzipi Livni

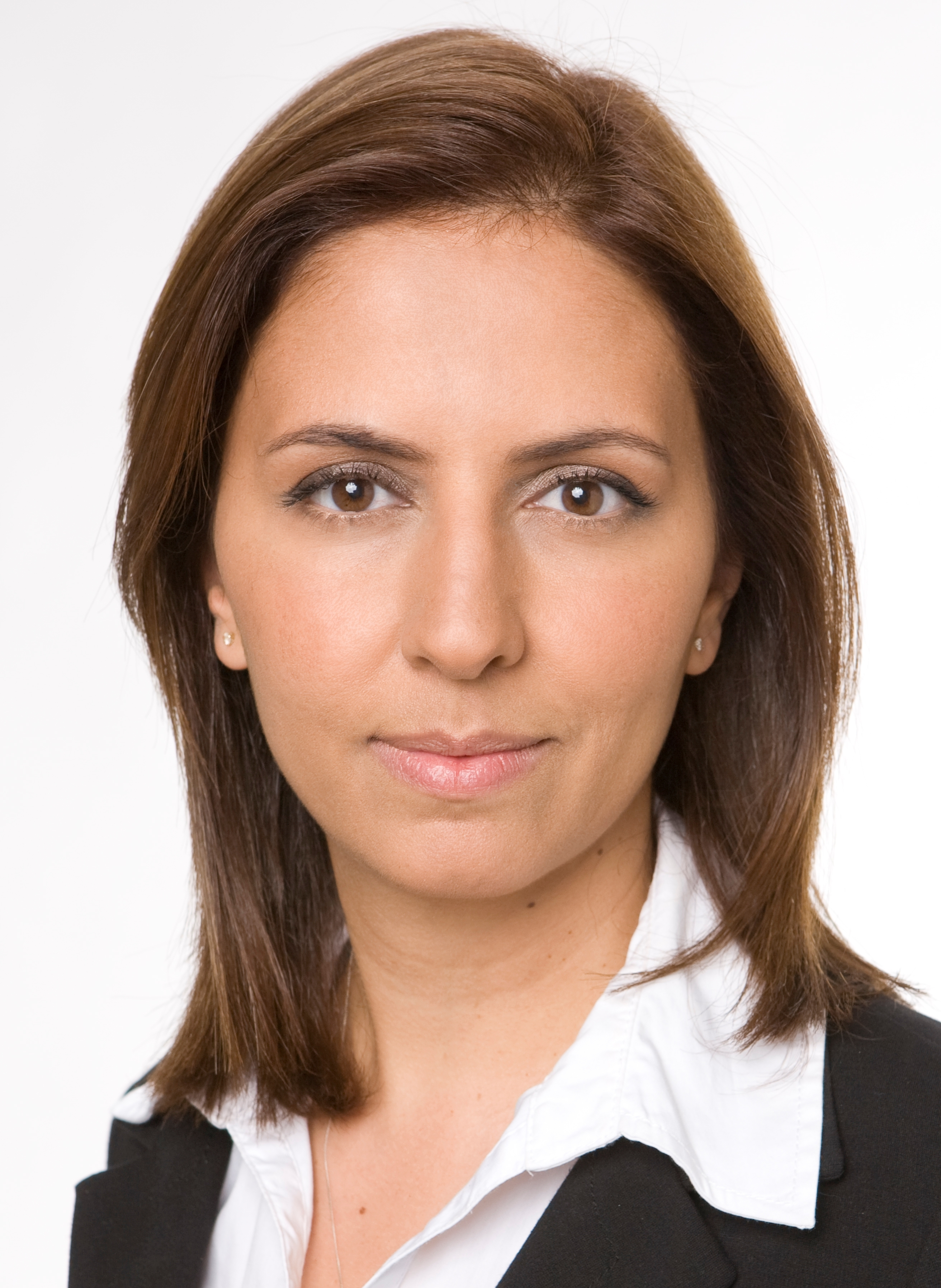
Gila Gamliel

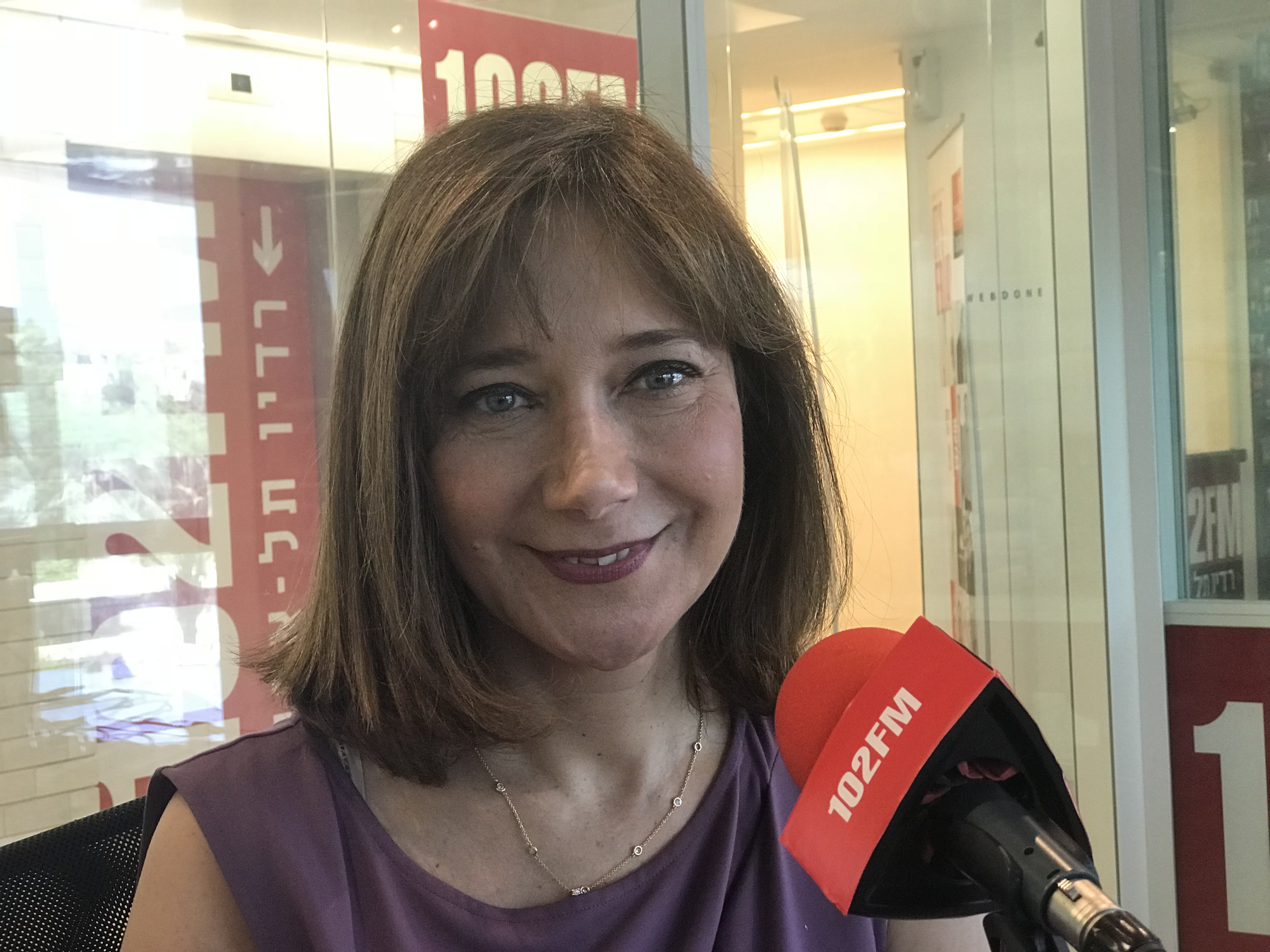
Revital Swid

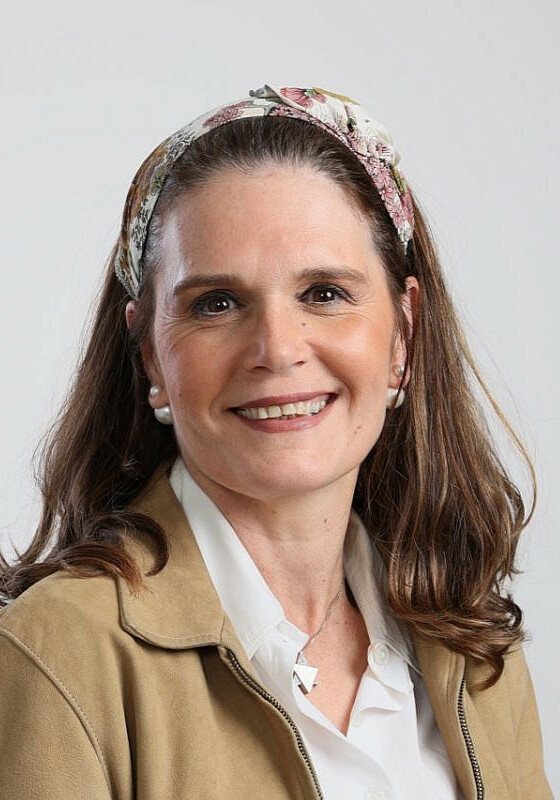
Michal Waldiger

- Zvi Arad (1942–2018) – mathematician, former president of Bar-Ilan University and of the Netanya Academic College
- Ami Ayalon – former head of the Shin Bet and member of the Knesset for the Labor Party.
- Michael Ben-Ari – Israeli politician and formerly a member of the Knesset for the National Union Party.
- Kotel Da-Don – Croatian Orthodox rabbi of the Bet Israel community in Zagreb.
- Avi Dichter – former minister of home front defence. Former Shin Bet director.
- Yuval Diskin – 12th director of the Israeli Internal Security Service Shin Bet.
- Esther Farbstein – Holocaust scholar
- Baruch Fischer – Professor Emeritus in the Andrew and Erna Viterbi Faculty of Electrical and Computer Engineering at the Technion
- Tzipi Hotovely – Israeli diplomat and former politician who serves as the current ambassador of Israel to the United Kingdom. Formerly deputy minister of foreign affairs, minister of diaspora affairs, minister of settlement affairs, and as a member of the Knesset for the Likud Party
- Gila Gamliel – Israeli politician for the Likud Party. Formerly minister for social equality, and minister of environmental protection
- Anat Guetta – chair of the Israel Securities Authority (ISA) since 2018
- Michael Harris – named the best Israeli in the field of academics, as one of "The 10 Most Successful Israelis in 10 Different Fields in the World" by Maariv in April 2012.
- Joseph Klafter – chemical physics professor, the eighth president of Tel Aviv University
- Joshua Kulp – Talmudic scholar
- Norman Lebrecht (born 1948) – British commentator on music and cultural affairs, and novelist
- Tzipi Livni – Israeli lawyer and politician, head of the Opposition from 2009 to 2012. Formerly minister of justice, and in charge of negotiations with the Palestinians
- Gadeer Mreeh (born 1984) – first woman of Druze descent to become a member of the Knesset
- Orit Peleg – professor of biophysics at the University of Colorado
- Zehorit Sorek (born 1975) – LGBTQ rights activist

== Notable faculty ==
- Doron Aurbach
- Nathan Aviezer
- Moshe Bar
- Avi Bell
- Pinkhos Churgin
- Cyril Domb
- Shlomo Eckstein
- Avraham Faust
- Adam Ferziger
- Jonathan Fox
- Hillel Furstenberg
- Ruth Halperin-Kaddari
- Oren Harman
- Shlomo Havlin
- Arye L. Hillman
- Max Jammer
- Efraim Karsh
- Mordechai Kedar
- Sarit Kraus
- Ernest Krausz
- Baruch Kurzweil
- Aren Maeir
- Nina Pinto-Abecasis
- Arie Reich
- Tamar Ross
- Mary Schaps
- Daniel Sperber
- Avraham Trahtman
- Eli Vakil
- Zeev Zalevsky

== Gallery ==
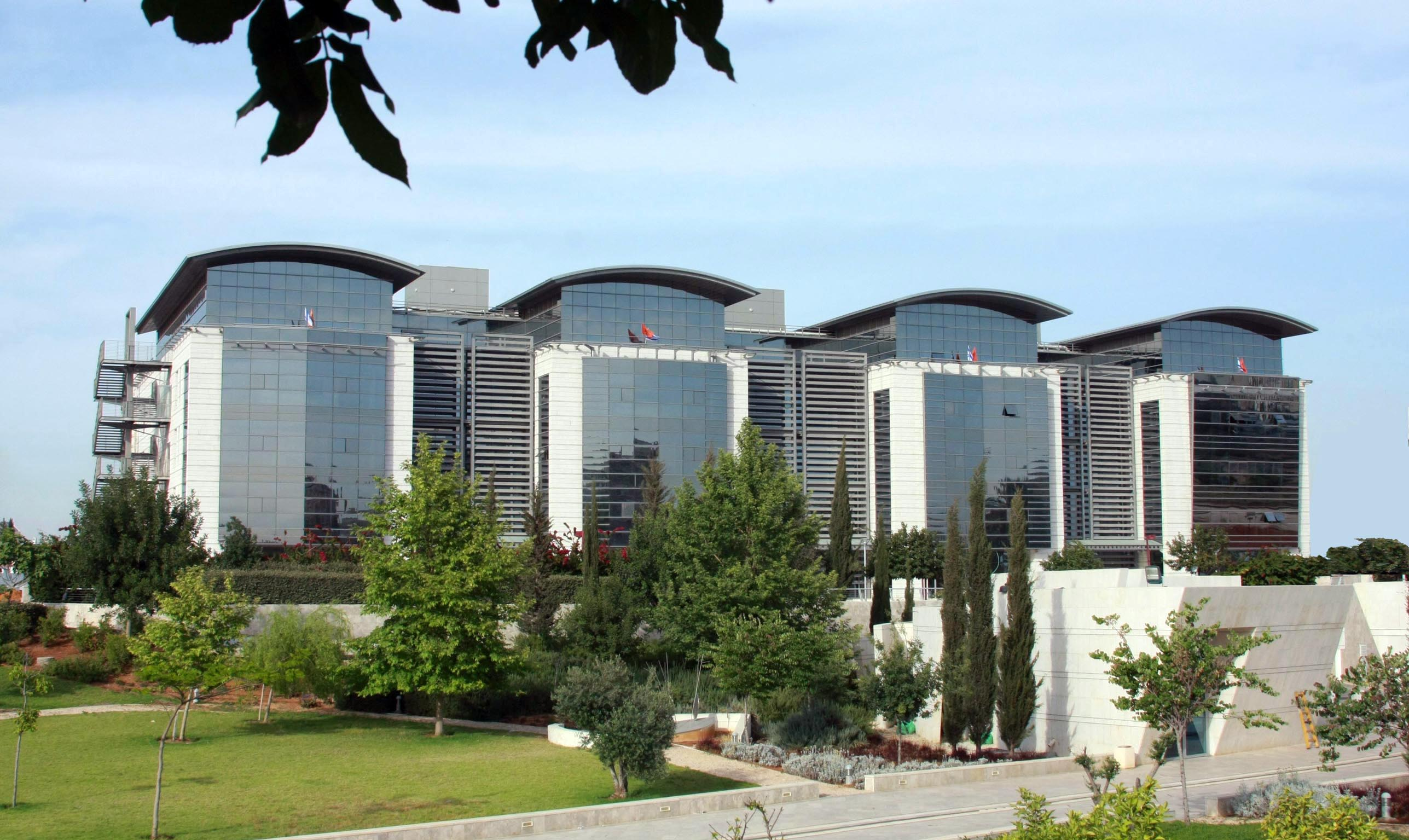
Faculty of engineering

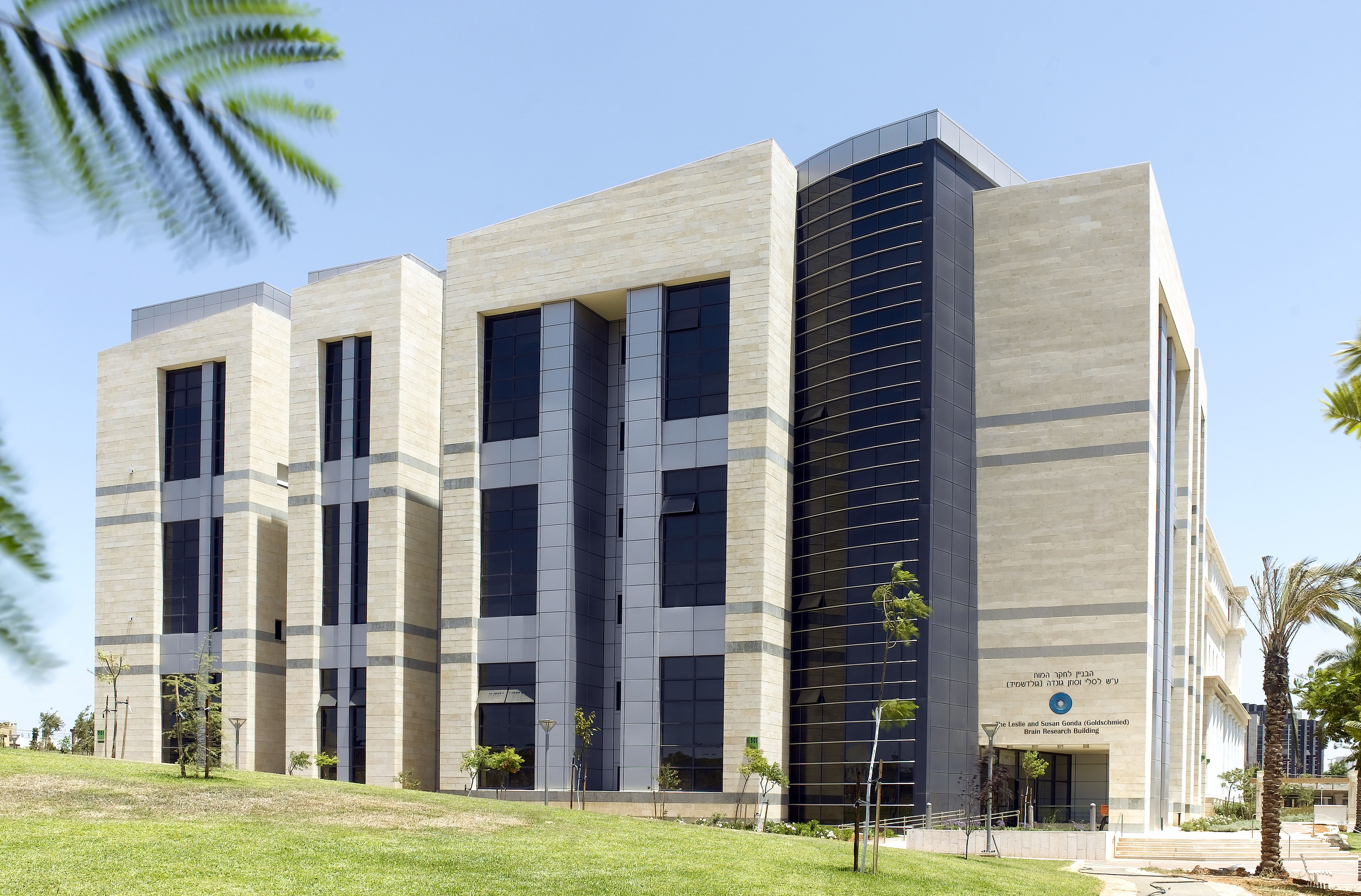
Multidisciplinary Brain Research Center

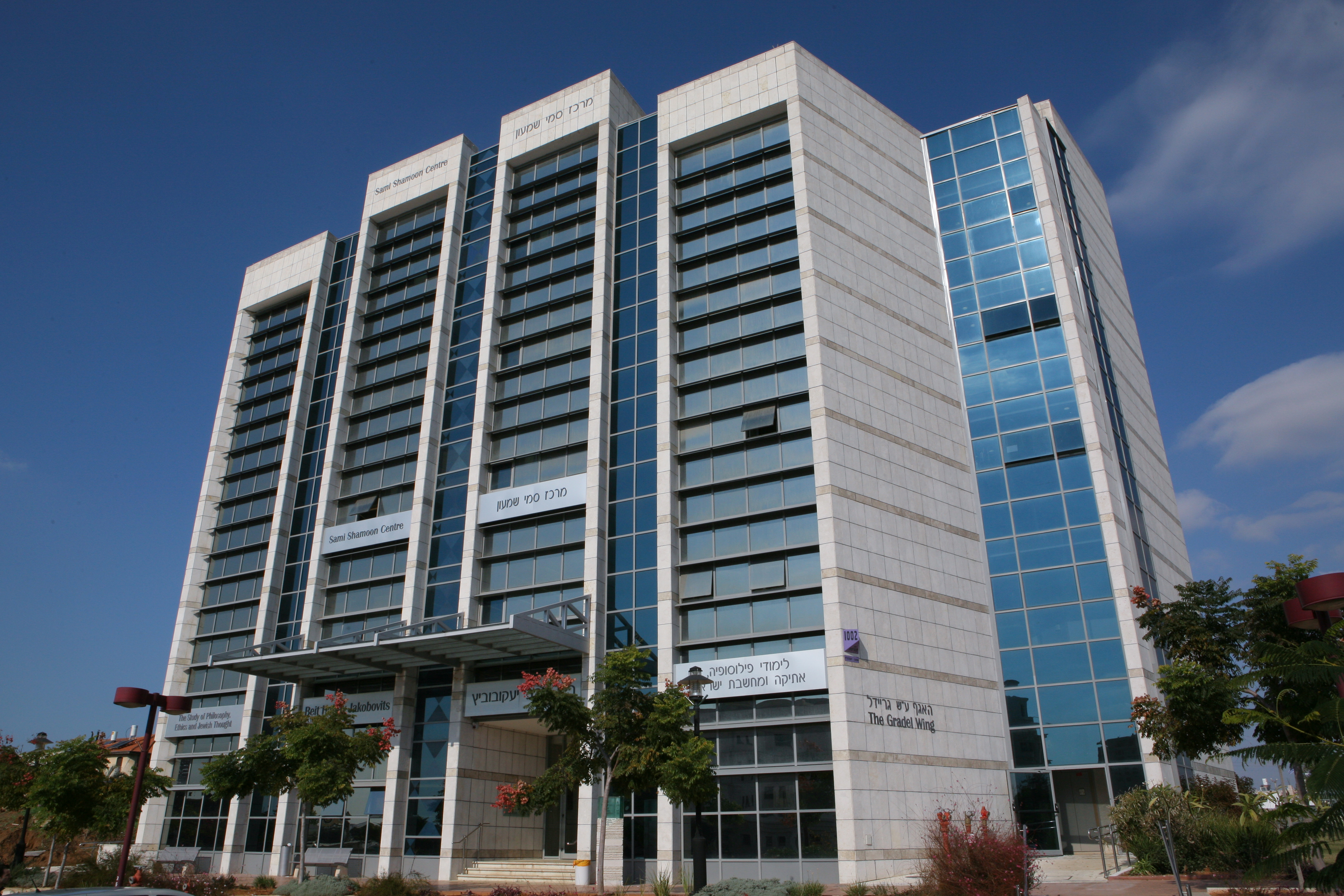
Centre for the study of philosophy, ethics and Jewish thought

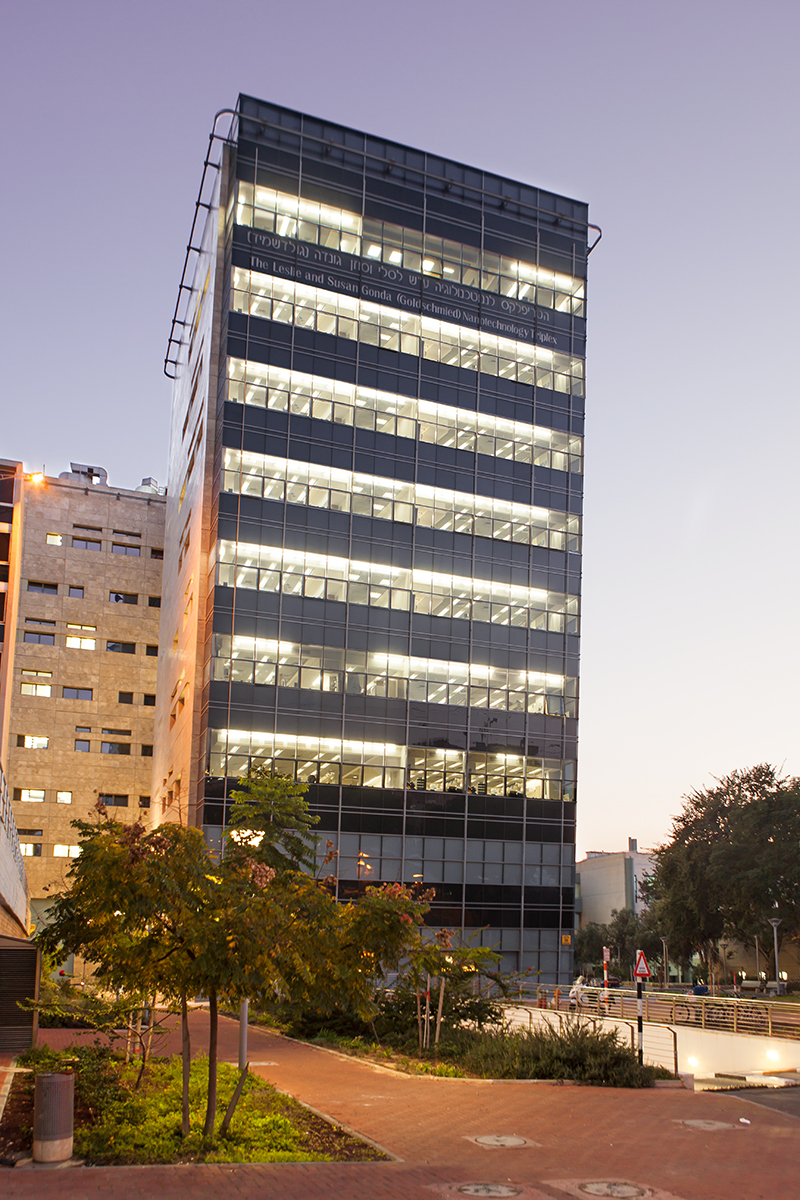
Nanotechnology building

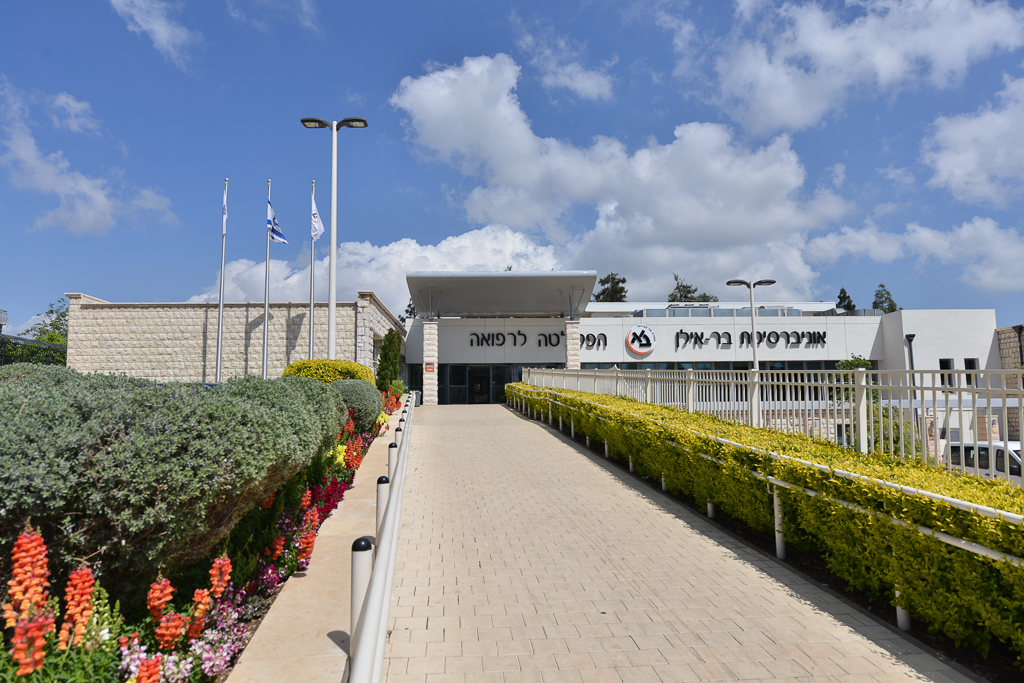
Bar-Ilan Faculty of Medicine

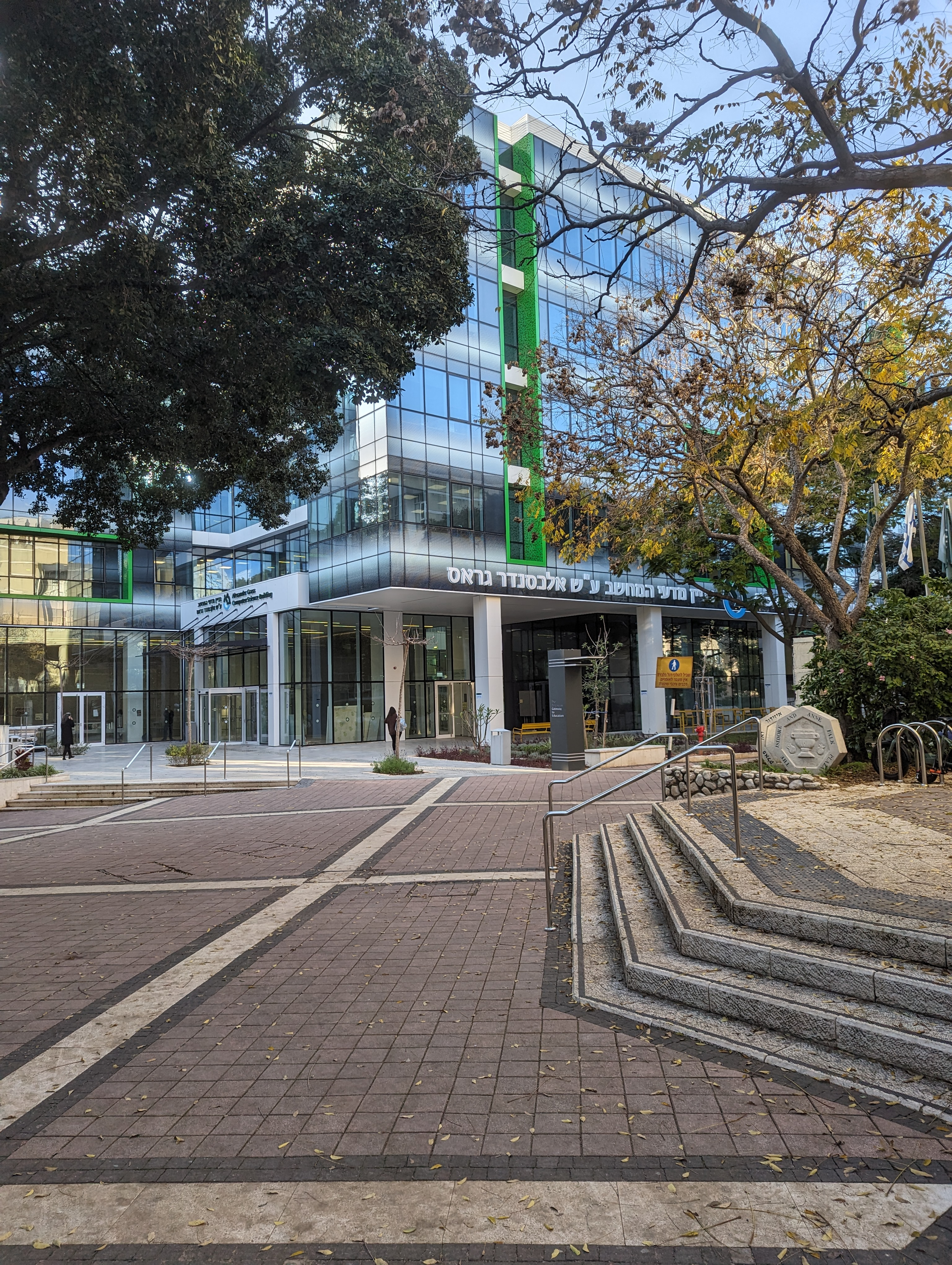
Bar-Ilan Faculty of Mathematics and Computer Science

== See also ==
- Ashkelon Academic College
- Kinneret College
- List of universities in Israel
