= Baruch Fischer =

Israel professor of electrooptics

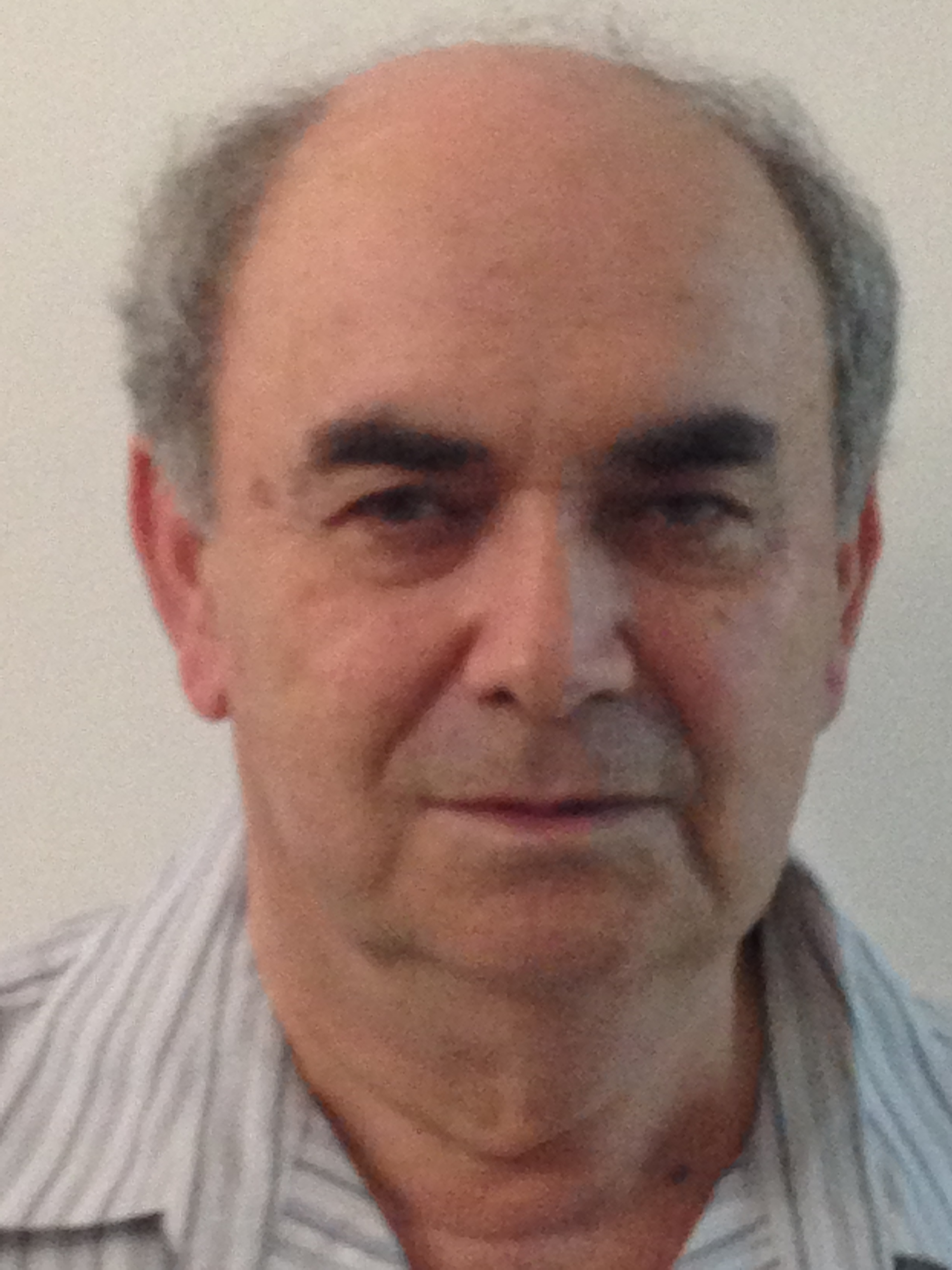
- Education: Bar-Ilan University, Caltek
- Children: 4
- Awards: Optica Fellow
- Scientific career
- Fields: ElectroOptics
- Workplaces: Techneon

Baruch Fischer (Hebrew: ברוך פישר) is an Israeli optical physicist and Professor Emeritus in the Andrew and Erna Viterbi Faculty of Electrical and Computer Engineering of the Technion, where he was the Max Knoll Chair in Electro-Optics and Electronics.

He is a fellow of Optica (formerly known as the Optical Society of America) from 1996 "For contributions to photorefractive nonlinear optics, including development of the double phase conjugate mirror".

== Early life and education ==
Baruch Fischer received his B.Sc. in 1973 in Physics from Bar-Ilan University. He continued his studies in Bar-Ilan, earning M.Sc. in 1975 and Ph.D. in 1980 (with "highest distinction").

== Career ==
Fischer was a Weizmann Postdoc Research Fellow at the California Institute of Technology (Caltech) from 1981, and joined the Technion in 1983 as a Senior Lecturer at the Department of Electrical Engineering. He was promoted to an Associate Professor in 1987 and to full professor in 1991.

Fischer served as the Dean of the Andrew and Erna Viterbi Faculty of Electrical and Computer Engineering during 1999–2004. In his Deanship period he conceived and founded the Moshe and Sara Zisapel Nano-Electronics Center and built the Viterbi Computech Center. He was the Head of the Micro-Electronics Research Center during 1993–2001, and the Opto-Electronics Research Center during 2008–2017. He retired in 2017 as an Emeritus Professor.

During the years, Fischer was a Topical Editor for Optics Letters, and on the editorial board of the Journal of Nonlinear Optical Physics and Materials. He was a Director of the Board of MRV Communications, Inc. (Chatsworth, CA), and was a member of the Technion Board of Governors. He founded in 2000 the start-up company "All-Optical".

Fischer was a visiting scholar and professor in Caltech, USC, Bell Labs, the University of Illinois, Tufts university, MIT and Bar-Ilan University.

He has supervised graduate students and postdocs. Among them (in academia): Shmuel Sternklar (now in Ariel University), Shimon Weiss (now in UCLA), Mordechai Segev (now in Technion), Moshe Horowitz (now in Technion), Omri Gat (now in the Hebrew University), and Gilead Oren (now in Soreq SNRC).

== Research ==
His research included: Dipole and strain glasses (à la spin glass) and magnetic and electric impurities in 2D metals, nonlinear-optics, where in the past he worked on photorefractive and phase conjugate optics (imitates "time reversal"), formulated and solved the full basic photorefractive four-wave mixing nonlinear equations, invented the first passive (self-pumped) phase-conjugate mirrors, the double phase conjugation, photorefractive self-trapping and photorefractive spatial solitons.

He demonstrated fixing information (images and gratings) in photorefractive crystals, the first transverse modes locking phenomenon and synthetic dimensions that can be lower or higher than 3 (hyper-combs) in mode-locked lasers.

He also worked on wave mixing in Bacterio-Rhodopsin, fiber-optics and fiber-optic communications, pulse optics, a new tunable laser, and localization effects in fibers and lasers.

Recently, he developed the approach of many-body photonics, showing a new view and use of statistical-mechanics based study in optics and lasers. It included phase-transitions and critical phenomena in lasers and light, noise-mediated Casimir-like pulse interactions mechanism in lasers, new classical laser light condensation effects, and the first observation of thermalization and quantum-statistical-based Bose-Einstein Condensation (BEC) of photons in fibers.

== Personal life ==
Fischer is married to Esther and the father of Oded, Renana (Fischer-Weinberger) and Miriam (Fischer-Horowitz).
