= Mishkenot Zevulun, Netanya =

Mishkenot Zevulun משכנות זבולון
- Neighborhood
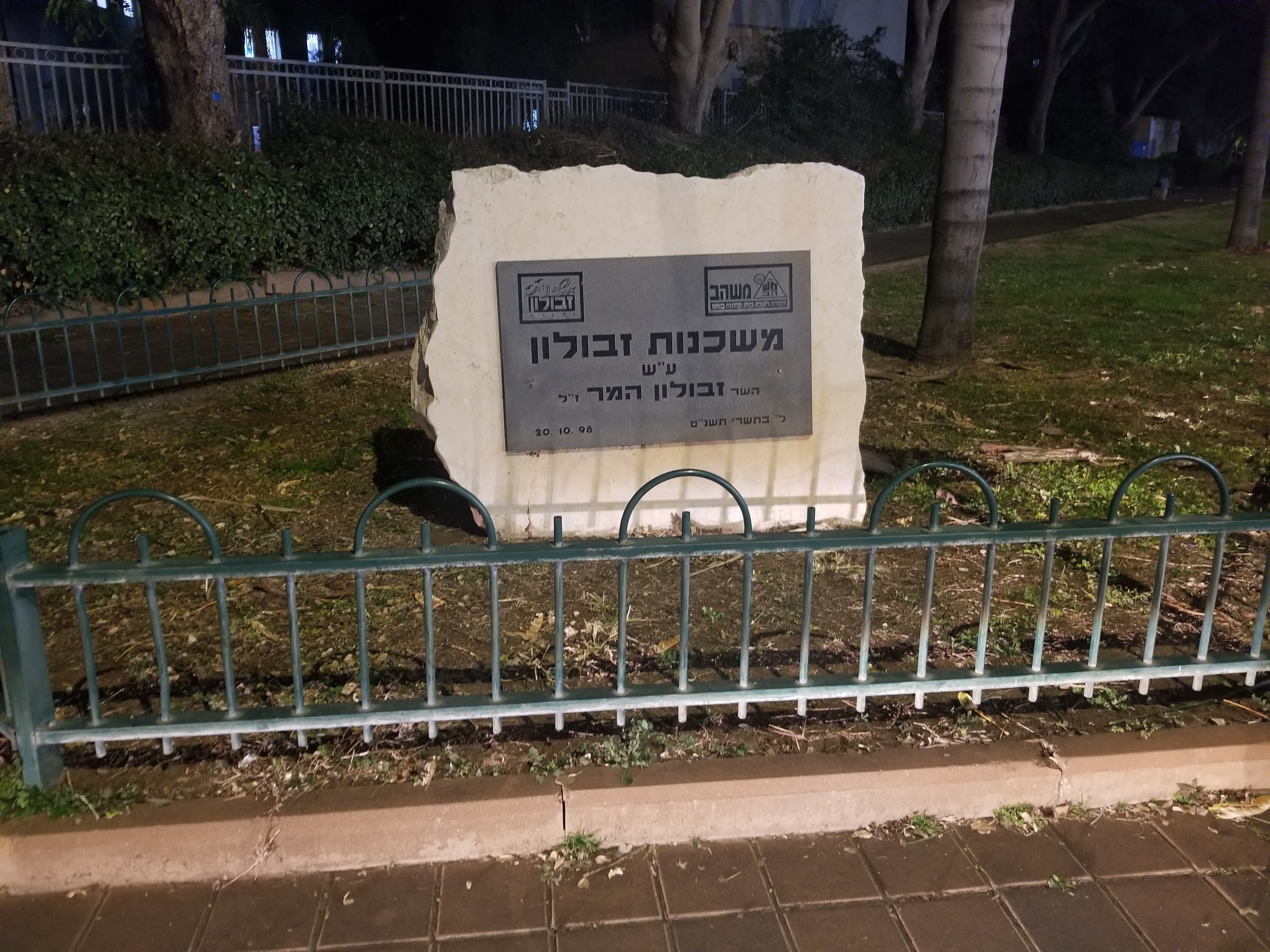
- Interactive map of Mishkenot Zevulun
- Location within Israel
- Coordinates: 32.3093510°N 34.8788445°E,
- Established: April 1957

Government
  - Eastern District Manager: Gan Whitman (גאן ויטמן)

Mishkenot Zevulun (Hebrew: משכנות זבולון) is a neighborhood located in eastern Netanya and named after Zevulun Hamer, Israel's Minister of Education in the 1970s and 80s. The neighborhood is also known as Mashahav (the name of the company that built the neighborhood's houses).

== History ==
In the 1950s and 60s, apartments in the area began being built to accommodate new immigrants. Those that moved here constituted a relatively low socioeconomic level. It also was intended to serve as a residential solution for families from the Dati leumi sector. In 1994, the Netanya Academic College was established in this neighborhood by Zvi Arad at the request of Mayors of Yoel Elroi and Zvi Poleg. Families who have made aliyah to Mishkenot Zevulun from 26 countries have been documented.

== Education ==
The religious state school in the neighborhood is named after Roi Klein, a major who jumped on a grenade to save nearby soldiers in the 2006 Lebanon War. The commercial center in the heart of the neighborhood, "Mercaz David," is named after Klein's grandfather, David Moshavitz.

Mishkenot Zevulun is home to the Netanya Academic College. in 2008, 3000 students studied at the college.

== Housing ==
From 1995 to 2008, there was an increase from 7% to 24.4% in the number of renters in Mishkenot Zevulun. Noam Cohen, director of the economic department at Geocartography, explained that the increase in demand for rental properties is correlated with the opening of colleges nearby those areas.
