= Elihu Ben-Onn =

Israeli journalist

Brigadier General Elihu Ben-Onn
- אליהוא בן-און
- Elihu Ben-Onn
- Born: July 18, 1954 (age 72); Jerusalem, Israel
- Education: Hebrew University of Jerusalem
- Occupations: Journalist, radio broadcaster, talk-show host
- Known for: Editor-in-chief of Yoman Haboker, Host of HaKesher HaYisraeli
- Awards: B'nai B'rith World Centre Award for Journalism (2006)

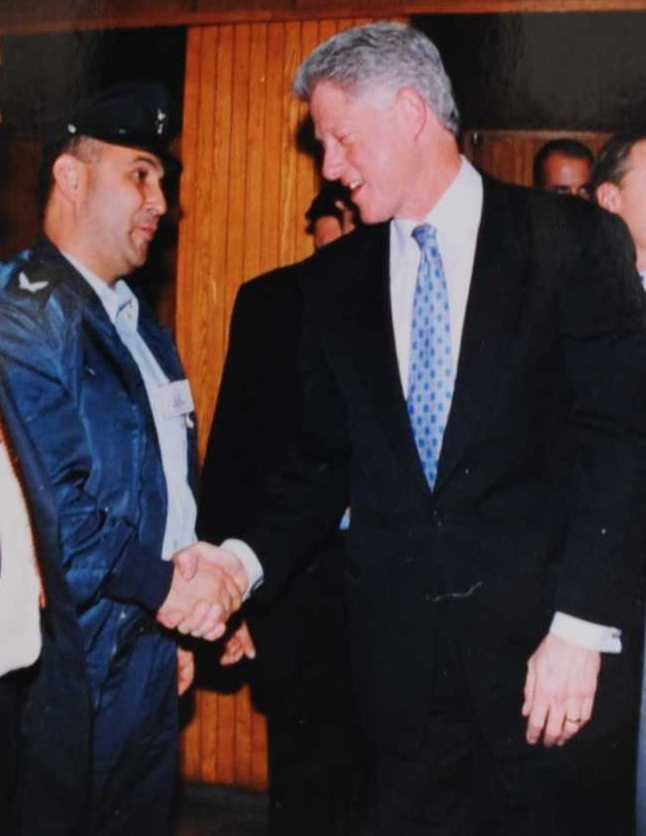
Brig. Gen Elihu Ben-Onn as Israeli Police Spokesman, with US President Bill Clinton, Jerusalem, December 1998.

Elihu Ben-Onn (Hebrew: אליהוא בן-און; born July 18, 1954) is a retired Israeli brigadier general, former Israel Police spokesman and a senior National Radio broadcaster, international talk-show host and journalist in Kol Yisrael.

Ben-Onn was born in Jerusalem and served in the Israel Defense Forces as an officer and the assistant to the Commander of the Armoured Corps, reaching the rank of lieutenant-colonel. During the Yom Kippur War, Ben-Onn was a tank gunner in the Suez Canal region.

Ben-Onn has a degree from the Hebrew University in international relations and history. He is also a graduate of the Israel Broadcasting Authority's school of journalism.

Ben-Onn has covered wars, elections and many facets of the Arab-Israeli conflict and Peace Process. He has served as the editor-in-chief of Kol Yisrael's Yoman Haboker (Morning news magazine), Israel's highest-rated radio news magazine. He also hosts call-in programs and talk shows.

He is well known in Israel for his coverage of the Israeli Premier Soccer League and specifically for being the play-by-play announcer of the games of Beitar Jerusalem.

In 1999, Ben-Onn started a weekly international call-in program called HaKesher HaYisraeli (The Israeli Connection), geared toward Israelis, Jews and Hebrew speakers abroad. The show has earned an honorable mention by the American Jewish Joint Distribution Committee and won the B'nai B'rith World Centre Award for Journalism in 2006.

In 1997, Ben-Onn served as the spokesman of the Israel National Police, holding the rank of brigadier general. From 1989 to 1991 Ben-Onn was the spokesman for the Israeli Ministry of Energy and Infrastructure.

Since 1984, Ben-Onn lectures in Jewish communities across the world about subjects related to his work as a journalist and his military background.
