= Optik =

Optik may refer to:

- Optik (journal), a scientific journal of optics
- Optik Software, a game developer
- Optik TV from Telus.
