= Orit Peleg =

Israeli biophysicist

- אורית פלאג
- Born: 1983 (age 42–43)
- Education: Bar-Ilan University; ETH Zurich
- Scientific career
- Fields: Biophysics
- Workplaces: Harvard University; University of Colorado Boulder; Santa Fe Institute
- Thesis: Coarse-grained models of competitive interactions in biophysical systems from chains and fibrillar networks to hairy surfaces (2012)
- Doctoral advisor: Martin Kroger Viola Vogel Yitzhak Rabin
- Other academic advisors: L. Mahadevan Eugene Shakhnovich
- Website: http://peleglab.com

Orit Peleg (Hebrew: אורית פלג; born 1983) is an Israeli computer scientist, biophysicist and Associate Professor in the Computer Science Department and the BioFrontiers Institute at the University of Colorado Boulder in Boulder, CO. She is also an External Professor of the Santa Fe Institute. She is known for her work on collective behavior of insects and the biophysics of soft living systems, including honeybees and fireflies. Applications of her work range from human communication, smart-material design, and swarm robotics. She has won national and international awards and prizes, including a Sloan Research Fellowship in Physics in 2023, a National Science Foundation CAREER Award in 2022, a Cottrell Scholars Award in 2022 and being named a National Geographic Explorer in 2021.

== Education and academic career ==
Peleg completed her Bachelor's and Master's degrees in Physics and Computer Science at Bar-Ilan University in Ramat Gan, Israel in 2007. She received her PhD in 2012 from ETH Zurich, where she studied competitive interactions in biological systems. Her doctoral research considered the physics of biological nanopores. Peleg then moved to Harvard University, where she was a postdoctoral fellow in the Department of Chemistry and Chemical Biology and then the School of Engineering and Applied Sciences. There she worked on the evolution of protein interactions and the morphology of honeybee swarms.

== Research and career ==
In 2018, Peleg joined the faculty of the University of Colorado Boulder in the Computer Science Department and the BioFrontiers Institute. In 2019 she was appointed to the Santa Fe Institute. Her research considers how living organisms generate and interpret signals for the purpose of communication.

=== Fireflies ===
Peleg revealed that fireflies synchronize their flashing and that there is a critical density that must be reached before the fireflies can get in rhythm with one another. This work was covered by popular news outlets, including National Geographic, NPR, Smithsonian Magazine, Harper's Magazine, and The New York Times.

=== Honey bee communication ===
Peleg is interested in the communication of honey bees, which can aid the conservation of pollinating insects. She uncovered how swarms of honey bees communicate through scenting to create scent "maps" so that the swarm can locate the queen bee. Peleg demonstrated that honey bees collaborate in clusters to respond to mechanical forces when the swarm is shaken, and that honey bees collaborate to create air ventilation in congested nest cavities. This work was also covered in the popular media, including ABC News, Discover Magazine, and Forbes.

== Awards and honors ==
- 2023 Sloan Fellowship in Physics from the Alfred P. Sloan Foundation.
- 2022 CAREER Award from the National Science Foundation for "Principles of Firefly Rhythmic Synchronization".
- 2022 Cottrell Scholar Award from Research Corporation for Science Advancement for "The Physics of Firefly Communications: Principles and Predictions".
- 2021 Junior Scientific Award of the Complex Systems Society "for her contributions to the understanding of collective dynamics".
- 2021 National Geographic Explorer Grantee for "High-throughput Automatic Monitoring Tools for Firefly Conservation".
- 2019 Appointed as External Faculty at Santa Fe Institute
- 2019 Elected as Member–at–Large at the Executive Committee of the Division of Biological Physics, American Physical Society
- 2016 Selected for Rising Stars in Physics at MIT

== Select publications ==
- Sarfati, Raphael; Joshi, Kunaal; Martin, Owen; Hayes, Julie C.; Iyer-Biswas, Srividya; Peleg, Orit (2023-03-13). "Emergent periodicity in the collective synchronous flashing of fireflies". eLife. 12 e78908. doi:10.7554/eLife.78908. PMID 36912783.
- Fard, Golnar G; Zhang, Daisy; Jiménez, Francisco L; Peleg, Orit (2022-11-23). "Crystallography of honeycomb formation under geometric frustration". Proceedings of the National Academy of Sciences. 119 (48) e2205043119. Bibcode:2022PNAS..11905043F. doi:10.1073/pnas.2205043119. PMC 9860281. PMID 36417443.
- Sarfati, Raphaël; Peleg, Orit (2022-11-16). "Chimera states among synchronous fireflies". Science Advances. 8 (46) eadd6690. Bibcode:2022SciA....8D6690S. doi:10.1126/sciadv.add6690. PMC 9668303. PMID 36383660.
- Shishkov, Olga; Chen, Claudia; Madonna, Claire A.; Jayaram, Kaushik; Peleg, Orit (2022-10-17). "Strength-mass scaling law governs mass distribution inside honey bee swarms". Scientific Reports. 12 (1): 17388. Bibcode:2022NatSR..1217388S. doi:10.1038/s41598-022-21347-5. PMC 9576786. PMID 36253489.
- Sarfati, Raphaël; Gaudette, Laura; Cicero, Joseph M.; Peleg, Orit (2022-03-23). "Statistical analysis reveals the onset of synchrony in sparse swarms of Photinus knulli fireflies". Journal of the Royal Society Interface. 19 (188) 20220007. doi:10.1098/rsif.2022.0007. PMC 8941412. PMID 35317654.
- Sarfati, Raphaël; Hayes, Julie C.; Peleg, Orit (July 2021). "Self-organization in natural swarms of Photinus carolinus synchronous fireflies". Science Advances. 7 (28) eabg9259. Bibcode:2021SciA....7.9259S. doi:10.1126/sciadv.abg9259. PMC 8262802. PMID 34233879.
- Nguyen, Dieu My T.; Iuzzolino, Michael L.; Mankel, Aaron; Bozek, Katarzyna; Stephens, Greg J.; Peleg, Orit (2021-03-30). "Flow-mediated olfactory communication in honeybee swarms". Proceedings of the National Academy of Sciences. 118 (13) e2011916118. Bibcode:2021PNAS..11811916N. doi:10.1073/pnas.2011916118. ISSN 0027-8424. PMC 8020754. PMID 33758099.
- Peters, Jacob M.; Peleg, Orit; Mahadevan, L. (2019). "Collective ventilation in honeybee nests". Journal of the Royal Society Interface. 16 (150) 20180561. doi:10.1098/rsif.2018.0561. ISSN 1742-5689. PMC 6364655. PMID 30958168.
- Peleg, Orit; Peters, Jacob M.; Salcedo, Mary K.; Mahadevan, Lakshminarayanan (December 2018). "Collective mechanical adaptation of honeybee swarms". Nature Physics. 14 (12): 1193–1198. Bibcode:2018NatPh..14.1193P. doi:10.1038/s41567-018-0262-1. S2CID 256708098.
- Tagliazucchi, Mario; Peleg, Orit; Kröger, Martin; Rabin, Yitzhak; Szleifer, Igal (2013-02-26). "Effect of charge, hydrophobicity and sequence of nucleoporins on the translocation of model particles through the nuclear pore complex". Proceedings of the National Academy of Sciences. 110 (9): 3363–3368. Bibcode:2013PNAS..110.3363T. doi:10.1073/pnas.1212909110. PMC 3587244. PMID 23404701.
- Peleg, Orit; Tagliazucchi, Mario; Kröger, Martin; Rabin, Yitzhak; Szleifer, Igal (2011-06-28). "Morphology control of hairy nanopores". ACS Nano. 5 (6): 4737–4747. doi:10.1021/nn200702u. PMID 21524134.
