= Ernest Krausz =

Israeli Professor of Sociology, Rector (1931–2018)

- ארנסט קראוס
- Born: Ernest (Kopul) Krausz; August 13, 1931; Alba Iulia, Romania
- Died: December 10, 2018 (aged 87); Tel Aviv, Israel
- Known for: Professor of Sociology, Rector, and Acting President at Bar Ilan University; Professor at the Netanya Academic College

Ernest (Kopul) Krausz (Hebrew: ארנסט קראוס; August 13, 1931 - December 10, 2018) was an Israeli professor of sociology who served as rector and Acting President of Bar Ilan University. He also taught at Netanya Academic College.

== Biography ==
Ernest Krausz was born in Romania. His parents were Rabbi Moshe Eliezer Krausz and Beila (née Gottlieb), and he and his two sisters were raised in Alba Iulia, where his father was Chief Rabbi.

He arrived in Britain from Romania two years after the end of World War Two, at 17 years of age. In England his father served in rabbinical positions in Leeds and London.

Krausz attended Etz Chaim Yeshiva in London for four years. He was a graduate of the University of London (B.Sc.(Econ.), M.Sc.), and then graduated from the London School of Economics with a PhD in sociology. He then taught at various colleges, and finally as a professor at City University, London. In 1962, he married Gillian Collins and they settled in Golders Green.

== Academic career ==
In 1972 Krausz was appointed Professor of Sociology at Bar Ilan University. He became Dean of the Social Science Faculty (1973 to 1976), then Rector (1986 to 1989), and then served as Acting President of the university in 1989, succeeding Michael Albeck and followed by Zvi Arad. From 1991 to 1997 Krausz was a member of the Planning and Budgeting Committee of the Council for Higher Education in Israel.

After he retired from Bar Ilan University in 2001, he taught for 12 years as a professor in the School of Behavioral Sciences at the Netanya Academic College.

== Published works ==
Among the books he wrote were Leeds Jewry: Its History and Social Structure (Jewish Historical Society of England, 1964), Sociology in Britain: A Survey of Research (Columbia University Press, 1969), Ethnic Minorities in Britain (MacGibbon and Kee, 1971), Studies of Israeli Society: Migration, Ethnicity and Community (Transaction Pub, 1980), Migration, ethnicity and community (Transaction, 1981), The Sociology of the Kibbutz (Transaction Books, 1983), Education in a Comparative Context (Transaction Publishers, 1989), The Limits of Science (Peter Lang, 2000), Education, Nihilism, and Survival (Routledge, 2017), and Politics and Society in Israel (Routledge, 2017).
