= Netanya Academic College =

Private college based in Netanya, Israel

Coordinates: 32°18′26.02″N 34°52′47.32″E

- האקדמית נתניה
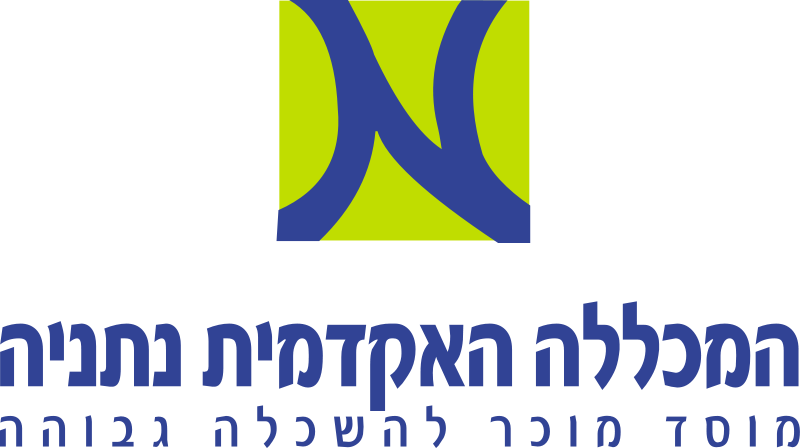
- Type: Private college
- Established: 1994
- Students: 4,000
- Location: Netanya, Israel
- Website: www.netanya.ac.il

Netanya Academic College (Hebrew: האקדמית נתניה, romanized: HaAkademit Netanya) is a private college based in Netanya, Israel. Established in 1994 by a team from Bar-Ilan University, it has an enrollment of around 4,000 undergraduate students. It was founded by Zvi Arad, who served as its president for 24 years.

== History ==
The college was established in the Mishkenot Zevulun neighborhood in 1994 by Zvi Arad at the request of the mayors of Netanya, Yoel Elroi and Zvi Poleg. A partner in the initiation and establishment of the college was Miriam Feirberg, who at that time served as head of the Education Department of Netanya. Today the college is an accredited institute of higher education that grant first and second academic degrees in a variety of fields.

The college offers Bachelor's and Master's degrees in several subjects, focusing on law, business administration, finance and computer science.

In 2023, Netanya made international news after a mob of Jewish Israelis chanted "death to Arabs" at Palestinian students living in the campus dorms. Roi Amgar, the head of the local Garin Torani, posted on X, "In Netanya we are not going to give up until they kick out the Arabs who are at Netanya College! The police will not stop us, nor the municipality, nor the state!" Israeli Police dispersed the crowd and took the students out of the dorms.

== Tuition ==
The Netanya Academic College is a nonprofit college and does not receive funding from the State of Israel. The college relies primarily on tuition fees paid by students and donations. Tuition amounts to approximately 30,000 NIS per year, with numerous scholarships available for Arab and Druze students.

== Notable alumni ==
- Anat Guetta (born 1967), economist and chair of the Israel Securities Authority (ISA)
- Moshe Kahlon (born 1960), politician
- Esther Salmovitz (born 1948), lawyer and member of the Knesset

== Notable faculty ==
- Zvi Arad (1942–2018), mathematician, acting president of Bar Ilan University, and president of Netanya Academic College
- Yuval Dror (born 1971), specialist in sociology of technology
- José Faur (1934–2020), Sephardic Hakham (rabbi), teacher, and scholar
- Yehuda Kahane (born 1944), businessman and academic
- Ernest Krausz (1931–2018), Israeli professor of sociology and President of Bar Ilan University
- Ron Malka, diplomat and economist who served as ambassador of Israel to India
- Jacob Turkel (1935–2023), Justice of the Supreme Court of Israel

== See also ==
- Netanya Academic College alumni
- Academic staff of Netanya Academic College
- List of universities and colleges in Israel
- Education in Israel
