= Arie Zaban =

Israeli professor of chemistry (born 1961)

- אריה צבן
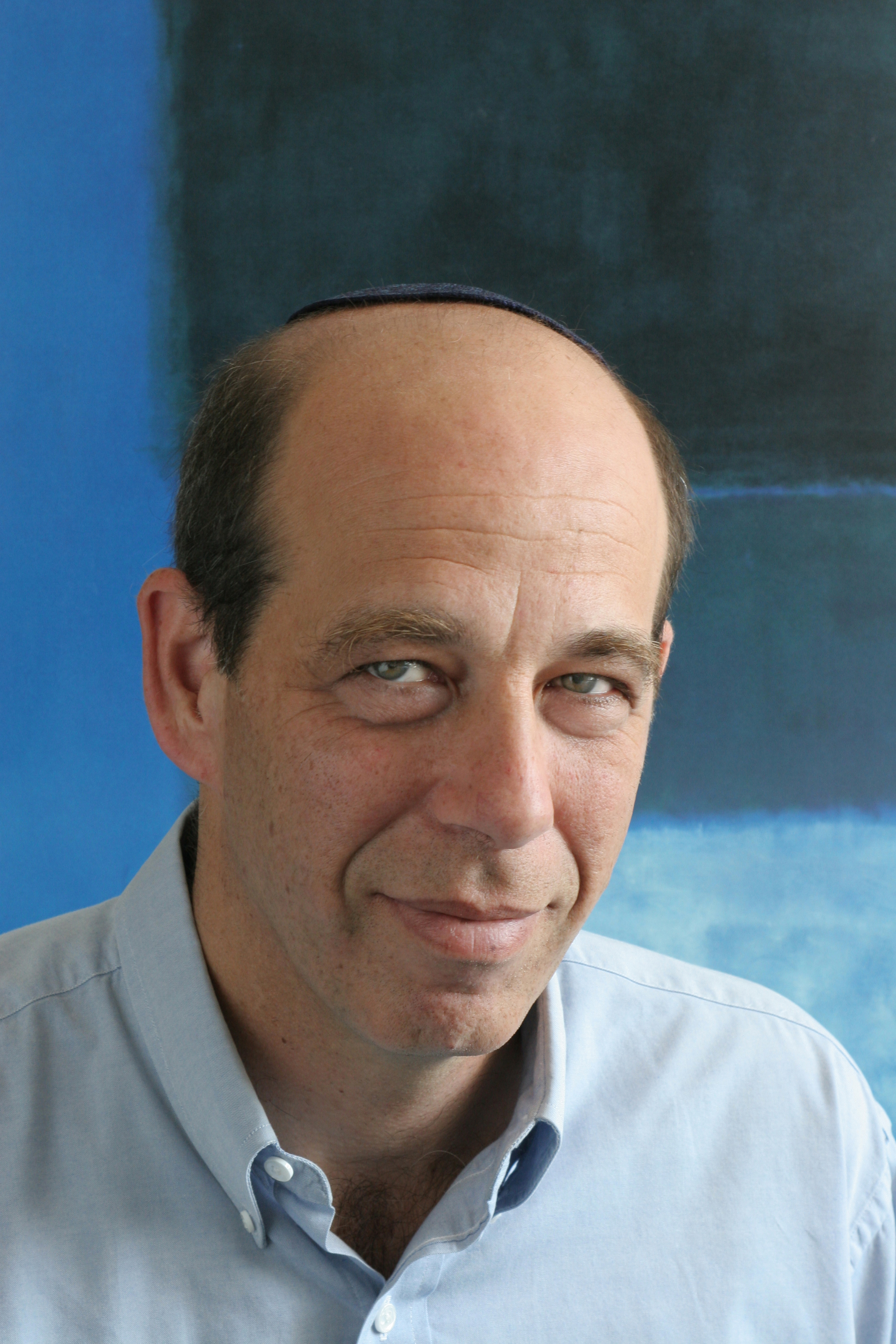
- Arie Zaban (2005)
- Born: 1961 (age 64–65); Israel
- Occupation: Professor of Chemistry
- Known for: President of Bar-Ilan University

Arie Zaban (Hebrew: אריה צבן; born in 1961) is an Israeli professor of chemistry. He is President of Bar-Ilan University.

== Biography ==
Arie Zaban was born in Israel. He served in the Israel Air Force as a Phantom pilot. He earned a B.Sc. in Chemistry and a Ph.D. in Electrochemistry from Bar-Ilan University. He spent two years of postdoctoral work at the United States National Renewable Energy Laboratory in Colorado.

== Academic career ==
He returned to Bar-Ilan, becoming a professor of chemistry. He was a founding director of the Bar-Ilan’s Institute of Nanotechnology and Advanced Materials for seven years, and was elected to be Bar-Ilan's Vice President of Research in 2014. In 2017 Zaban was elected to be Bar-Ilan's eighth president, succeeding Daniel Hershkowitz.

== See also ==
- Education in Israel
