= Shlomo Eckstein =

Israel economist (1929–2020)

- שלמה אקשטיין
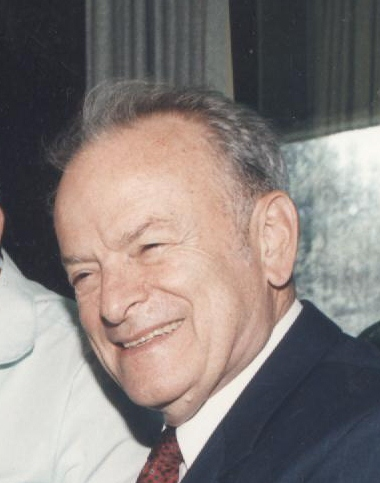
- Born: Shlomo Raber Eckstein; 1 November 1929; Wiesbaden, Hesse-Nassau, Prussia
- Died: 12 January 2020 (aged 90)
- Occupation: Economist
- Known for: President of Bar-Ilan University

Shlomo Raber Eckstein (Hebrew: שלמה אקשטיין; 1 November 1929 – 12 January 2020) was an Israeli economist, and President of Bar-Ilan University.

== Biography ==
Eckstein was born in Wiesbaden, Germany. His family emigrated from Germany before World War II to Mexico, which is where he was raised.

He earned a degree in Economics at the National University of Mexico in 1957, and earned a Ph.D. in Economics from Harvard University in 1964. His 1963 dissertation was on "Collective Farming In Mexico."

== Academic career ==
Later, he made aliyah to Israel, becoming an Israeli citizen, and became a professor of Economics and founded the Department of Economics at Bar-Ilan University in 1960. He was Chairman of the Department from 1961 to 1965, and from 1968 to 1971. He was the Rector at the university from 1978 to 1982. He was the university's President from 1992 to 1996, succeeding Zvi Arad and followed by Moshe Kaveh.

He died on 12 January 2020 at the age of 90.
