= Arie Reich =

Israeli legal scholar

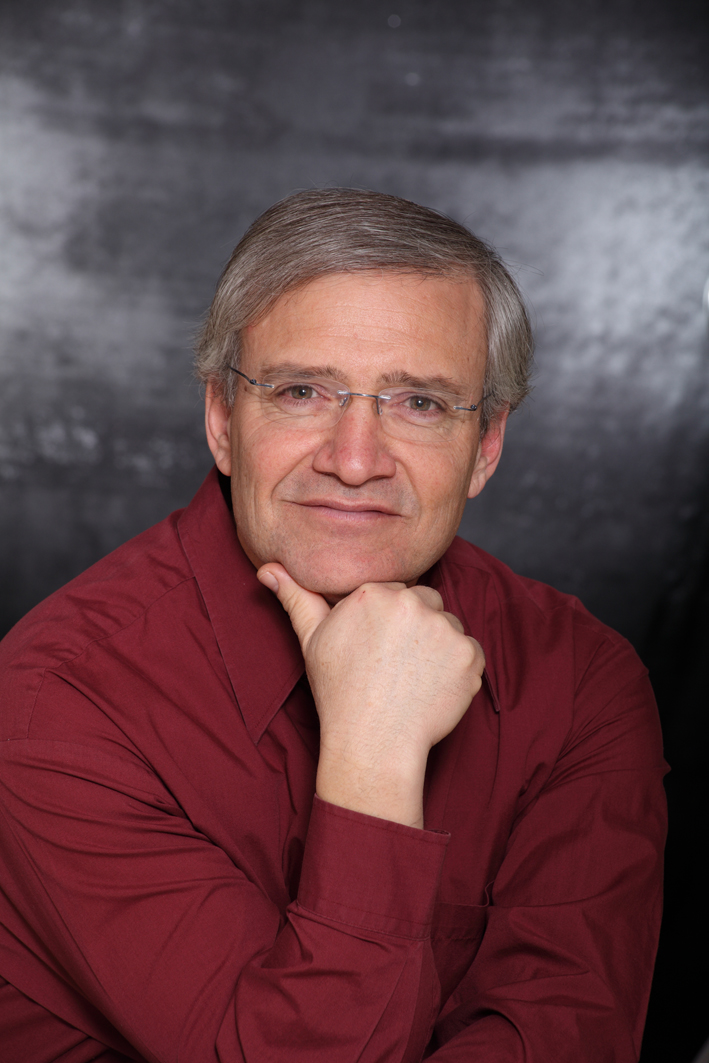
Reich in 2014

Arie Reich (Hebrew: אריה רייך; born September 23, 1959) is an Israeli legal scholar specializing in international trade law and European Union Law. He is a full professor at the Bar-Ilan University Faculty of Law, and serves as the Vice Rector of the university. He previously served as the Dean of the Faculty of Law and Dean of students.

== Biography ==
Reich was born in Göteborg, Sweden. In 1973 his family made Aliyah and moved to Herzliyah Pituach, Israel. Following high school, Reich joined a group of students under the tutelage of Rabbis Haim Sabato and Yitzhak Shilat as part of the founding class of Yeshivat Hesder Birkat Moshe in Maale Adumim. In 1978 Reich was drafted into the Armored Corps of the IDF where he served as a tank gunner. Concurrent to his studies in Yeshiva Reich received a teaching license specializing in Judaic studies from the Lifshitz Teachers College in Jerusalem. Following completion of a L.L.B (cum laude) from Bar-Ilan University, he clerked for a year under the Honourable Mr. Justice Abraham Meyshar o.b.m. of the Tel-Aviv District Court. Reich then worked as an associate lawyer in the law offices of Miron, Bension & Prywes, Advocates & Notaries, in Tel-Aviv, Israel. In 1989 Reich and his family moved to Toronto, Canada, where he received his L.L.M and S.J.D. from the University of Toronto. He wrote his thesis under the supervision of Michael Trebilcock titled "Toward Free Trade in the Public Sector: A Comparative Study of International Agreements on Government Procurement". In 1991 Reich returned to Israel to take a position on the Faculty of Law at the Bar Ilan University.

== Professional career ==
Reich filled many positions at Bar Ilan University, including director of the Center for Commercial Law, chairman of the Students Discipline Committee (2007–2008), vice dean of the Law Faculty (2003–2007), dean of the Law Faculty (2008–2012), the dean of students (2018-2020) and currently the Vice Rector (2020-). He also holds the Jean Monnet Chair for European Union Legal Studies.

Reich has also held many public positions, including chairman of the Trade Levies Commission, Israel's anti-dumping and countervailing duty tribunal (1996–2002), member of the advisory council of Israel's Industrial Cooperation Authority (ICA). Appointed by the Minister of Industry, Trade and Employment. (2009–present), member of the World Trade Organization dispute settlement panel on European Union – Definite Anti-Dumping Measures on Certain Iron or Steel Fasteners from China (2010), member of the World Trade Organization dispute settlement panel on United States – Countervailing and Antidumping Measures on Certain Products from China (DS449) (2013), and member of the World Trade Organization dispute settlement panel on European Union – Definitive Anti-Dumping Measures on Certain Iron or Steel Fasteners from China: Recourse to Article 21.5 of the DSU by China (DS397) (2014).

Reich has also served as visiting professor at UCLA (1999), University of Toronto (2005–2006), University of Pennsylvania- Bok Visiting International Professor (2011), Columbia University (2013), University of Luxembourg (2013), Monash University (2013), University of International Business and Economics, Beijing China (2014), as a visiting scholar in Columbia University in New York, and as a Fernand Braudel Senior Scholar in European University Institute in Florence, Italy.

== Publications ==
=== English ===
==== Books (author) ====
1. The Impact of the European Court of Justice on Neighbouring Countries (A. Reich, H.W. Micklitz, eds) (Oxford University Press, 2020).
2. Transnational Commercial and Consumer Law: Current Trends in International Business Law (Springer, 2018)(T. Kono, M. Hiscock, A. Reich, eds.).
3. International Public Procurement Law: The Evolution of International Regimes on Public Purchasing (London: Kluwer Law International, 1999); with a preface by Lord Slynn of Hadley, House of Lords, formerly judge of the European Court of Justice.

==== Book chapters ====
1. "The Effectiveness of the WTO Dispute Settlement System: A Statistical Analysis", in Transnational Commercial and Consumer Law, ibid., p. 1.
2. "Israel: A Comparative Study of Two Models", Domestic Judicial Review of Trade Remedies: Experiences of the Most Active Users" (Cambridge University Press, 2013), pp. 221–245 (with Gill Nadel).
3. "EU-Israel Trade in the Automobile Sector: Is Israel's High Taxation of Cars Legal under the Association Agreement?", in Integrating with the European Union: Accession, Association and Neighbourhood Policy (L. Cabada & M. Mravinac, eds.) pp. 238–255 (2008).
4. Core Labour Standards and the WTO: Beware of Unilateralism!- A Response to Werner Meng, in The Welfare State, Globalization, and International Law 395 (Springer Verlag, Benvenisti & Nolte eds. 2004).
5. The New GATT Agreement on Government Procurement: The Pitfalls of Plurilateralism and Strict Reciprocity, in Public Procurement - The International Library of Critical 65 Writings in Economics (Edward Elgar Publishing, S. Arrowsmith & K. Hartley eds, 2001)
6. The New GATT agreement on Government Procurement - Impressive Achievements but a Setback for Multilateralism, in New Developments in International Commercial and Consumer Law 317 (Oxford, UK: Hart Publishing, 1998).

==== Articles ====
1. "Israel's Foreign Investment Protection Regime in view of Developments in its Energy Sector", European University Institute Working Papers, Law 2017/02.
2. "The EU, UK and Israel: What to 'Brexpect'?" Israel Journal of Foreign Affairs, Volume 10, 2016 – Issue 2.
3. "The 2009 Reforms of Israel's Mandatory Tendering Regulations: One Step Forward, Two Steps Backward?" Public Procurement Law Review vol. 24, issue 6, 193–219 (2015).
4. "The European Neighbourhood Policy and Israel: Achievements and Disappointments", forthcoming in Journal of World Trade Volume 49:4 (2015).
5. "The Remedy of Damages in Public Procurement in Israel and the EU: A Proposal for Reform" (with Oren Shabat), Public Procurement Law Review 2014,2, 50–77. (Quoted by the Supreme Court of Israel in Administrative Appeal 10065/08 Atir v. State of Israel; and in A.A. 3879/09 Yahalomit Peretz v. Finance Ministry)
6. "Bilateralism v. Multilateralism in International Economic Law: Applying the Principle of Subsidiarity", 60 University of Toronto Law Journal 263-287 (2010).
7. "European Union-Israel Trade in the Automobile Sector", 32 The Comparative Law Yearbook of International Business 593-614 (2010).
8. "The New Text of the Agreement on Government Procurement: An Analysis and Assessment", 12 Journal of International Economic Law 989-1022 (2009).
9. "Is it Time to Update the 1985 US-Israel Free Trade Agreement, in view of EU Neighborhood Policy?", Begin-Sadat (BESA) Center Perspectives Papers No. 84, June 29, 2009.
10. "International Sales Transactions - A Series of Simulated Negotiation and Drafting Exercises"
11. "The Agricultural Exemption in Antitrust Law: A Comparative Look at the Political Economy of Market Regulation", 42 International Law Journal 843 (2007).
12. The World Trade Organization at a Crossroads, Foreword to Winter 2005 Issue of the University of Pennsylvania Journal of International Economic Law (2005) (with Oren Perez).
13. The Threat of Politicization of the World Trade Organization, 26 University of Pennsylvania Journal of International Economic Law 779 (2005).
14. Privately Subsidized Recycling Schemes and their Potential Harm to Developing Countries: Does International Trade Law Have a Solution? 23 Virginia.Environmental Law Journal 204 (2004).
15. The World Trade Organization as a Law-Harmonizing Institution,25 University of Pennsylvania Journal of Int'l Economic Law 321 (2004).
16. Institutional and Substantive Reform of the Antidumping and Subsidy Agreements: Lessons from the Israeli Experience, 37 Journal of World Trade (Vol. 6) 1037 (2003).
17. The New GATT Agreement on Government Procurement: The Pitfalls of Plurilateralism and Strict Reciprocity, 31 Journal of World Trade 125 (1997); also published in New Developments in International Commercial and Consumer Law (Oxford: Hart Publishing, 1998), p. 317-343; and in Public Procurement, (S. Arrowsmith & K. Hartley, eds) The International Library of Critical Writings in Economics (Edward Elgar Publishing, 2001) 65–91. Also translated into Chinese and published in a Chinese textbook on public procurement.
18. From Diplomacy to Law: The Juridicization of International Trade Relations, 17 Northwestern Journal of Int'l Law & Business 775 (1997). Hebrew version: 22 Tel-Aviv University Law Review, 1–75 (1998).
19. Major Developments in Israel's Public Procurement Law: A New Era in International Tendering, 9 Justice 25 (June, 1996).
20. On Procurement, Protectionism and Protests: A Survey among Canadian Procurement Officers, 23 Canadian Business Law Journal 107 (1994).
21. Government Procurement and Bid Challenging in Canada After the Free Trade Agreement, 18 Canadian Business Law Journal 195 (1991).
22. Articles on international trade law issues in the daily financial press.

==== Work in progress ====
Should Israel Join the Energy Charter Treaty?

=== Hebrew ===
==== Books (editor) ====
1. The World Trade Organization and Israel: Law, Economics and Politics (Bar Ilan University Press, 2006).

==== Book chapters ====
1. The Law of the European Union: Principles and Institutions, in International Law 159 (2nd Ed.) (Hebrew University Press, Robbie Sabel and Yael Ronen eds., 2010).
2. The World Trade Organization: From GATT to the WTO, in The World Trade Organization and Israel Law, Economics and Politics (Bar Ilan University Press, Arie Reich ed., 2006).
3. The History of Israel's Participation in the GATT and the World Trade Organization, in The World Trade Organization and Israel, Law, Economics and Politics (Bar Ilan University Press, Arie Reich ed., 2006).
4. The European Union, in International Law 121 (Hebrew University Press, Robbie Sabel ed., 2003).
5. Globalization & Law: The Future Impact of International Law on Israel's Commercial Law in The Israeli Law: A Look at the Future,271 (Bar-Ilan University Press, 2003.)

==== Articles ====
1. Arie Reich, "Why Israel Should Adopt the UNCITRAL Model Law on International Commercial Arbitration", forthcoming in Bar-Ilan L. Stud.
2. Arie Reich & Sharon Goldenberg, Computer Intrusion as a Civil Wrong, 10 Shaarey Mishpat 415 (2006).
3. Arbitration in International Investment Disputes, in Arbitration and Mediation in International Business, ICC-Israel (May, 2007).
4. "Does Money Talk? European (Unsuccessful) Attempts to Use Trade Policy to Further Foreign Policy Goals in the Middle East",12 Newsletter of Israeli Association for the Study of European Integration (November 2005), 5-8
5. Are there any Lessons for Israel from the (Temporary?) Failure of Europe's Constitution Project?, 17 Newsletter of the Israeli Association for the Study of European Integration 55 (2005).
6. Reform of the Antidumping and Subsidies Agreements,3 Kiryat HaMishpat (2003) 391.
7. Globalization & Law: The Future Impact of International Law on Israel's Commercial Law, 17 Bar-Ilan L. Stud.17 (2001). Quoted by the Israel Supreme Court in CA 7833/06 Pamesa Ceramica v. Yisrael Mendelson Ltd.
8. From Diplomacy to Law: The Juridicization of International Trade Relations, 22 Tel-Aviv U.L Rev. 351 (1999).
9. Regulating Competition in the Insurance Sector: Lessons from the European Community, 16 Bar-Ilan L. Stud.301 (2001). Quoted extensively by the Israel Supreme Court in its judgment: Cr.A. 4485/02 The State of Israel v. Borowitz P.D. 59(6)776, at 863–867.
10. The Uniform Law on International Sales: A Need for Revision, 14 Bar-Ilan L. Stud. 127 (1997). Quoted by the Israel Supreme Court in CA 7833/06 Pamesa Ceramica v. Yisrael Mendelson Ltd.
11. Opening up of Public Tenders to Competition in the EU: A Success or Failure?, 5 Newsletter of the Israeli Association for the Study of European Integration 8 (1998).
12. The Impact of the GATT Agreement on Government Procurement on the Israeli Law of Public Tenders, 12 Bar-Ilan L. Stud. 419 (1995).
13. The Punishment of "Kipah" (Imprisonment) in Jewish Law, 7 Me'aliyot 31 (1986). Accompanied with a response by The Hon. Justice Prof. Menachem Elon, Deputy Chief Justice of the Israel Supreme Court.
