= Moshe Kaveh =

Israeli physicist

- משה קוה
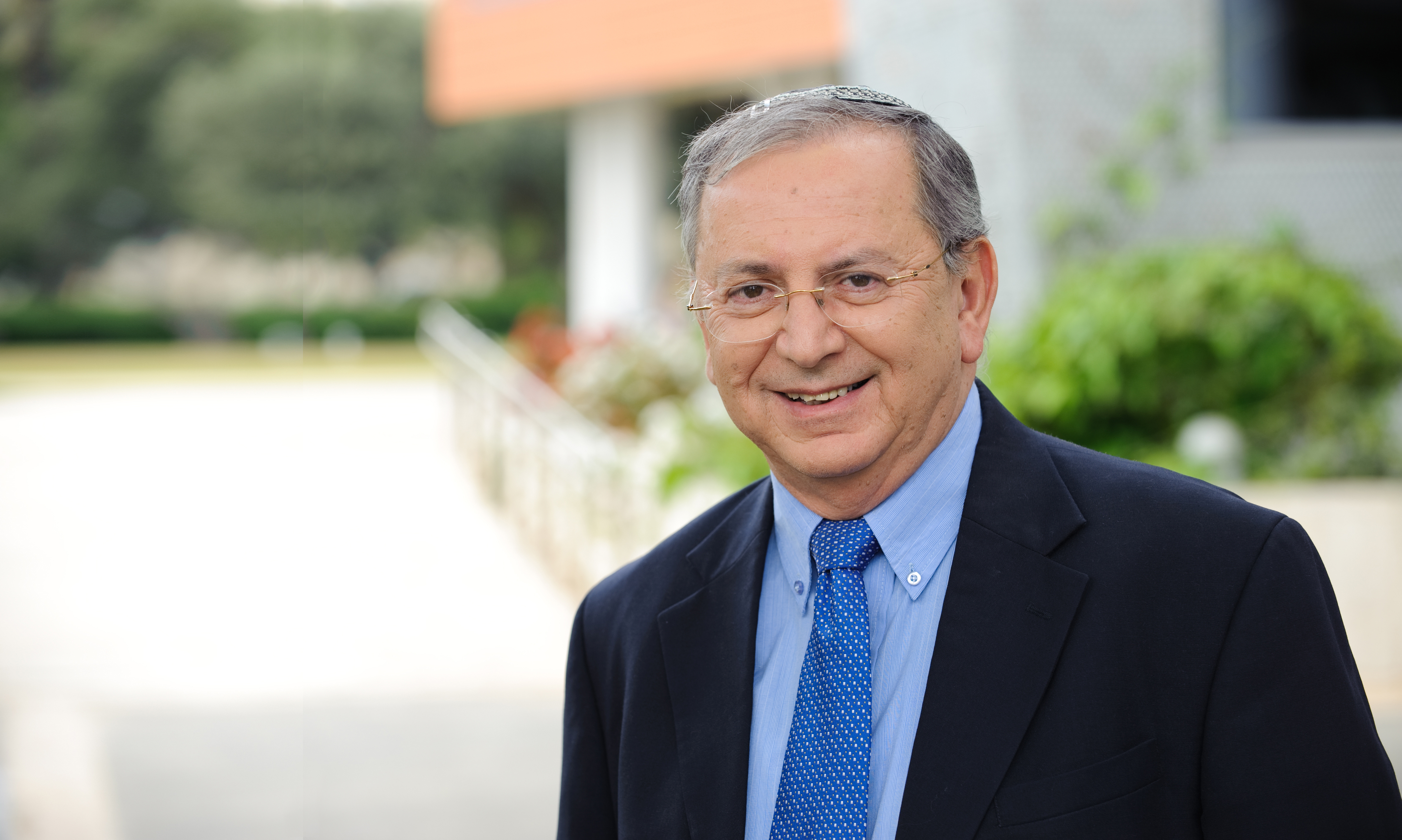
- Born: 1943 (age 82–83); Tashkent, Soviet Union
- Occupation: physicist
- Known for: President of Bar-Ilan University

Moshe Kaveh (Hebrew: משה קוה; born 1943) is an Israeli physicist and former President of Bar-Ilan University.

== Biography ==
Kaveh was born in Tashkent, Uzbek SSR, Soviet Union where his parents sought safety after fleeing from Poland. All of his father (Rabbi David Kaveh)'s ten siblings perished in the Holocaust. The Kaveh family immigrated to Israel in 1950.

He is a Professor in the Department of Physics at Bar-Ilan University. He has published over 300 articles on physics. Kaveh was Chairman of the Department, Dean of the school's Faculty of Natural Sciences, and Rector of Bar-Ilan. He completed his bachelors, masters, and doctoral degrees at Bar-Ilan University.

Kaveh was President of Bar-Ilan University from 1996 to 2013, succeeding Shlomo Eckstein and followed by Daniel Hershkowitz. In 2013 he resigned. Kaveh was chairman of Israel's Committee of University Presidents.

In 2008, the Israel Council for Higher Education awarded Kaveh its Prize for Higher Education.
