= Optik (journal) =

- Discipline: Optics
- Language: English
- Edited by: Jer-Shing Huang

Publication details
- History: 1946–present
- Publisher: Urban and Fischer
- Frequency: 18/year
- Impact factor: 3.1 (2021)

Standard abbreviations
- ISO 4: Optik

Indexing
- ISSN: 0030-4026
- OCLC no.: 1761348

Links
- Journal homepage; Online access (2001-present)

Optik: International Journal for Light and Electron Optics, or simply Optik (German for Optics) is a peer-reviewed scientific journal covering the optics of light and electrons. According to the Journal Citation Reports, the journal has a 2021 impact factor of 3.1.

In 2023, the journal had been delisted from the Web of Science for accepting papers produced by alleged paper mills. Jer-Shing Huang became Editor-in-Chief in 2023, inheriting the role from Theo Tschudi. Following this, the rate of rejection for papers increased, many pending publications were withdrawn, and several previously published papers have been retracted. Policies requiring supervision of guest and invited authors have also been enacted. Huang has indicated that many more publications are expected to be flagged in the future.

== See also ==
- Journal of the Optical Society of America B
- Journal of Lightwave Technology
- Journal of Nonlinear Optical Physics & Materials
