= Zehorit Sorek =

Israeli LGBTQ rights activist

- זהורית שורק
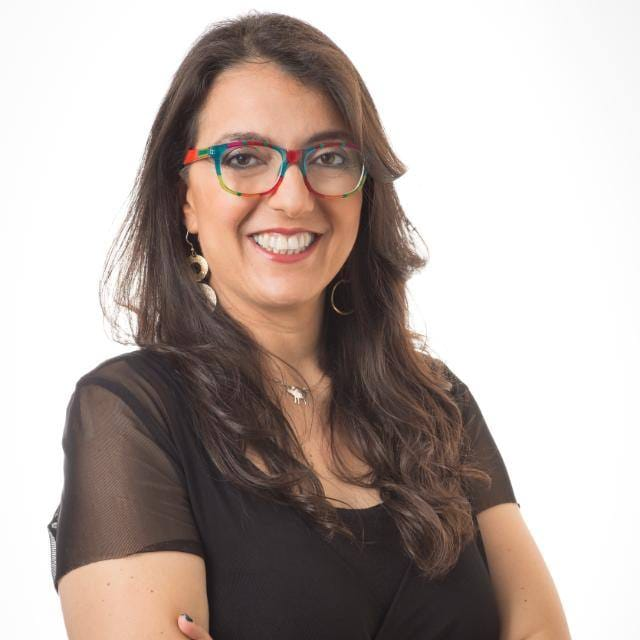
- Sorek in 2018

Personal details
- Born: 1975 (age 50–51) Bnei Darom, Israel
- Party: Yesh Atid
- Spouse: Limor Keren (m. 2009)
- Children: 2
- Education: Bar-Ilan University
- Occupation: activist
- Website: zehorit.co.il

Zehorit Sorek (Hebrew: זהורית שורק; born 1975) is an Israeli LGBTQ rights activist.

== Early life ==
Sorek was born in 1975 in Bnei Darom, a Moshav shitufi in Israel's Central District. She is from a Mizrahi Orthodox Jewish family of Moroccan descent. She was raised in Jerusalem, where she "studied at the top religious Zionist schools".

Sorek attended Bar Ilan University, where she earned a master's degree in the History and Archeology of Israel.

== Career ==
Sorek is one of the founders of the Proud (LGBTQ) Religious Community in Israel.

She has volunteered with various LGBTQ rights organizations in Tel Aviv and, in 2009, founded the Pride Minyan Group for LGBT Israelis after her synagogue's leadership prohibited her from celebrating her marriage in their building. She serves as the chairwoman of Havruta: Religious Gays, an organization founded in 2007 to support gay men in Jewish religious communities and to educate the public about LGBT issues. She also heads the LGBTQ Department of the Ramat Gan municipality.

She is a member of the lesbian rights campaign group Bat Kol.

Sorek visited the United States in conjunction with the LGBTQ organization A Wider Bridge.

In 2012, she was given an award in recognition of her activism.

In 2015, Sorek ran for the Knesset as a member of Yesh Atid.

Sorek was a member of the 2018 Gvanim cohort. Gvanim is a program run by the Jewish Federation which "works to strengthen Israel’s democracy by creating a cadre of leaders to spread the message of Jewish pluralism to ever-widening circles of Israelis".

== Personal life ==
Sorek is a lesbian. She first became aware of her attraction to women while studying in girls-only schools, but chalked it up to a phase brought on by the single-sex environment. She married a man at age 20, with whom she had two children. She came out as a lesbian at age 29, and divorced her husband in 2006, when she was 31.

Sorek married her wife, Limor Keren, in a civil ceremony in 2009. The couple and Sorek's two children live in Tel Aviv, where they attend a liberal Orthodox synagogue. She is an Orthodox Jew.

Sorek visited Morocco for the first time in 2017.
