= Jonathan Fox (professor of politics) =

Jonathan Fox (Hebrew: יונתן פאקס) is the Yehuda Avner Professor of Religion and Politics in the Department of Political Science at Bar-Ilan University in Ramat Gan, Israel. He has authored, co-authored, or edited 13 books and over 120 journal articles and book chapters on domestic and international ethnic and religious conflict and the role of religion in politics. He is also the director of the Religion and State project.

== Awards ==
- August, 2019: The Politics and Religion Distinguished Reviewer Reward, given by the Politics and Religion section of the American Political Science Association “to recognize the important work of peer reviewers”
- February 2017: The Distinguished Scholar Award, given by the Religion and International Relations section of the International Studies Association (ISA) at the ISA annual convention in Baltimore Maryland
- 2009: Distinguished article of the year, 2009 award from the Society for the Scientific Study of Religion for Jonathan Fox & Ephraim Tabory “Contemporary Evidence Regarding the Impact of State Regulation of Religion on Religious Participation and Belief” Sociology of Religion, 69 (3), 2008, 245-271.

== Education and career ==
Fox obtained a Ph.D. in Government and Politics at the University of Maryland 1997. Since 1997 he is a member of the Political Studies faculty at Bar Ilan university in Ramat Gan, Israel.

== Selected publications ==
- Thou Shalt Have No Other Gods Before Me: Why Governments Discriminate against Religious Minorities, (New York, NY: Cambridge University Press, 2020).
- The Correlates of Religion and State, (New York, NY: Routledge, 2019)
- The Unfree Exercise of Religion: A World Survey of Religious Discrimination against Religious Minorities, (New York, NY: Cambridge University Press, 2016).
- Political Secularism, Religion and the State: A Time Series Analysis of World Data (New York: Cambridge University Press, 2015). ISBN 9781107433915
- Religion in International Relations Theory: Interactions and Possibilities (London: Routledge, 2013) with Nukhet Sandal. ISBN 978-0415662628.
- An Introduction to Religion and Politics: Theory and Practice (London: Routledge, 2013). ISBN 978-041-567632-8
- Religion Politics Society and the State (New York: Oxford University Press, 2012). ISBN 978-0-199-94923-6.
- A World Survey of Religion and the State (New York: Cambridge University Press, 2008). ISBN 978-0-521-88131-9
- Religion in World Conflict (London: Routledge, 2006), edited with Shmuel Sandler. ISBN 0-415-37167-8.
- Bringing Religion into International Relations (New York: Palgrave-Macmillan, 2004), with Shmuel Sandler. ISBN 1-4039-6551-X.
- Religion, Civilization and Civil War: 1945 Through the New Millennium (Lanham, MD: Lexington Books, 2004). ISBN 0-7391-0744-5.
- Ethnoreligious Conflict in the Late Twentieth Century: A General Theory (Lanham, MD: Lexington Books, 2002). ISBN 0-7391-0418-7.
