= Israel National Institute for Energy Storage =

Israeli governmental research institute

- המכון הלאומי לאגירת אנרגיה
- Formation: June 3, 2025; 10 months ago
- Headquarters: Bar-Ilan University
- Location: Ramat Gan, Israel
- Parent organization: Ministry of Energy and Infrastructure
- Website: inies.org.il

The Israel National Institute for Energy Storage (Hebrew: המכון הלאומי לאגירת אנרגיה, romanized: HaMakhon HaLe'umi LeAgirat Energia) is an Israeli governmental research institute based at Bar-Ilan University, Ramat Gan. The institute specializes in the research and development (R&D) of energy storage technologies and was established as an academic collaboration between Bar-Ilan University and the Technion – Israel Institute of Technology. It operates under the auspices of the Ministry of Energy and Infrastructure, to which it is formally affiliated.

The institute was officially inaugurated on 3 June 2025.

== History ==
On 2 January 2023 the Ministry of Energy and Infrastructure announced that Bar-Ilan University and the Technion had won the tender to establish a national institute for energy storage. The institute's primary objectives are to strengthen Israel's global standing in the field, train specialized personnel, and facilitate the transfer of energy storage technologies from academia to industry. The institute is designed to operate across all stages of the technological development chain, from fundamental research to prototype development and commercial collaboration. This initiative is part of the Ministry of Energy and Infrastructure's roadmap to achieve net-zero emissions by 2050 – a plan published in August 2024 that emphasizes distributed storage and renewable energy.

The establishment of the institute was supported by an allocated budget of 130 million NIS over five years, with 100 million NIS funded by the Ministry of Energy and Infrastructure and the remainder provided by the partner institutions. These funds were designated for research, equipment procurement, and the upgrading of existing laboratory facilities.

The institute was officially inaugurated on 3 June 2025, during a ceremony held at the Energy Center at Bar-Ilan University. At the time of its opening, 6 private technology companies were already operating within the complex. During the inauguration, the institute launched its prototype laboratories, established with the support of the Leona M. and Harry B. Helmsley Charitable Trust, and announced the first 6 research proposals selected to receive funding from the institute.

== Structure and activities ==
The institute promotes fundamental and applied scientific research in the fields of energy conversion and storage by issuing calls for proposals and publishing findings in scientific journals.

The institute's faculty is shared between Bar-Ilan University and the Technion. Its governing bodies – the scientific and steering committees – also include researchers from other academic institutions, including Tel Aviv University, the Hebrew University of Jerusalem, Ariel University, Ben-Gurion University of the Negev, Reichman University, and the Weizmann Institute of Science.

== See also ==
- Renewable energy in Israel
- Israel Institute for Biological Research
