= Shmuel Hauser =

Israeli economist

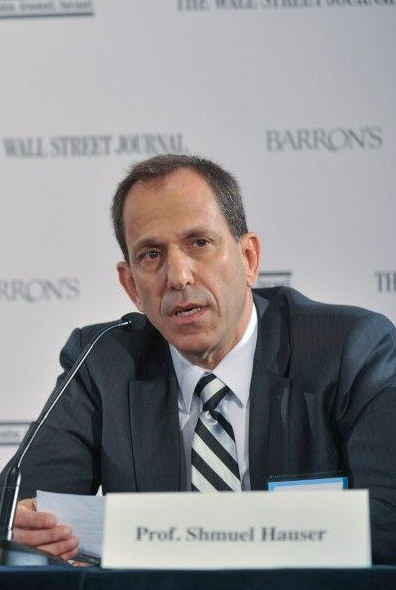
Shmuel Hauser at the Wall Street Journal Conference, New-York, 10.09.2012

Shmuel Hauser (Hebrew: שמואל האוזר) is an Israeli economist, a Full Professor of Finance at Ono Academic College and of Ben-Gurion University of the Negev. Former dean of the Business Administration Faculty at Ono Academic College. Hauser served as chairman of the Israel Securities Authority (ISA) between 2011 and 2018.

== Biography ==
Hauser was born in 1955 in the city of Ramle, where he grew up. He joined the Israel Defense Forces (IDF) in 1973 to the Paratroopers Brigade and served in the 890th Battalion. He left the army in 1977 as an officer.

In 1980 Hauser received his B.A in statistics and economics and in 1982 his MBA in finance, both from the Hebrew University of Jerusalem. 4 years later, he completed his Ph.D. at Temple University, Philadelphia.

Between the years 1987 to 1988 Hauser was employed as a senior economist in the Bank of Israel.

In 1989 he became the chief economist of the Israeli Securities Authority, a position he held for 17 years. During that time, he served as a:

- Member of a public committee, led by Uriel Procaccia, that recommended how to regulate alternative trading systems in the capital market (2001).
- Chairman of two public committees – the first recommended how to regulate the activities of market makers in the Tel Aviv Stock Exchange (2002), and the second recommended how to minimize manipulations in the capital market (2004).
- Consultant to the Knesset Economic Committee, chaired by MK Moshe Kahlon, regarding bank fees reform.

After leaving the ISA in 2005, Hauser established and headed a capital market consulting company named "Narrative". He also served as the chairman of "Gaon Meah-Net", a market making company, in addition to being a chairman of a risk capital raising company and a director in 3 major financial bodies.

Professor Hauser was a member of the committee on Increasing Competitiveness in the Economy (2011), which addressed the issue of centralization in the Israeli economy. He also served as a member of the Debt Settlement Committee (2014).

From 2011 to 2018, Hauser served as joint-chairman of Israel's Accounting Standards Board (IASB) and a member of an advisory committee to the Banks supervisor at the Bank of Israel.

In early 2017, he became a member of an advisory committee to Israel's Capital Market, Insurance and Savings Authority.

From 2019 to 2020, he served as Member of the Advisory Committee of CyberRight Tech. Prof. Hauser has also served as an external director in Gazit Globe Ltd, as an independent director in Alrov Group, Senior Advisor for eToro, member of Board of Directors of Cellcom, and member of the Investments Committee of the Israel Democracy Institute.

== Academic career ==
Concurrent with his work at the Securities Authority, Hauser developed an academic career as a lecturer and researcher in the fields of: Corporate Finance, Capital Market Regulations, Trading Strategy, Options and Future contracts, and International Financing.

Between 1987 and 1991 he was a visiting professor at the Hebrew University School of Administration. Between 1987 and 2006, Hauser was a visiting professor at Temple University and Rogers University in the US.

Hauser has been a member of the Faculty of Business Administration at Ben-Gurion University of the Negev since 1995: first as a senior lecturer, later as an associate professor and since 2005 as a full professor. He teaches there doctoral programs in the field of financing and numerous research students.

Hauser was appointed dean of the Faculty of Business Administration at the Ono Academic College, concurrent with his tenure as professor at Ben-Gurion University.

From 2012 to 2017, he served as a member of the Israeli Council for Higher Education.

Hauser has published dozens of research studies and articles on the Israeli capital market in leading academic journals throughout the world such as: The Journal of Finance, Journal of Financial Economics, The Review of Financial Studies, The Journal of Business and others. Among his most renowned articles:

- "The Price of Options Illiquidity".
- "The Value of Voting Rights to Majority Shareholders: Evidence from Dual Class Stock Unifications".
- "Allocations, Adverse Selection and Cascades in Ipos: Evidence from Israel".

Before being appointed chairman of the Israeli Securities Authority, Hauser was the dean of the Faculty of Business Administration at the Ono Academic College, and a full professor at Ben-Gurion University.

== Chairman of the Israel Securities Authority ==
In May 2011, Hauser was appointed chairman of the Israeli SecuritiesAuthority by Israel's Minister of Finance, Yuval Steinitz.

Professor Hauser's term is characterized by activism, increased enforcement and the opening of criminal investigations against senior executives.

He ordered to open in a criminal investigation against Nochi Dankner, the controlling shareholder of IDB Holding Corp. LTD, regarding a possible market manipulation (pump and dump). After the court ruling in which judge Khaled Kabub determined that Dankner was guilty, Hauser said: "I believe in uncompromising enforcement that creates deterrence". In 2017 he ordered opening of another criminal high-profile investigation against Bezeq Officials.

On taking up his post in May 2011, prof. Hauser proposed installing an electronic voting system to allow holders of securities to vote via the internet at meetings at which they are entitled to vote. The system became operational in June 2015.

In 2012, Hauser presented a road map for the Securities Authority, which included deregulation and removal of barriers during its process on one hand, and uncompromising enforcement on the other hand. The plan was fully approved in legislation in May 2016.

In 2013, Hauser led several actions which were aimed to protect the investors in the capital market along with the facilitation of regulation in order to help the companies in the market. Among these actions:

- A law promoting deregulation for the companies.
- Launching the CMMF (Conservative Money Market Fund) aimed at promoting the public's involvement and investment in the capital market.
- Reduction in distribution fees.

In that year, Hauser appointed two committees: the first was aimed to encourage investments in public companies operating in the field of research and development, and the second was aimed to improve trading and encourage liquidity in the Tel Aviv Stock Exchange. In 2016, the second committee's conclusions were translated into "The Research and Development" legislation that eased on high-tech companies to issue shares in Tel Aviv Stock Exchange, and therefore encouraged them to do so.

In 2015–2017, following the collapse of alleged Ponzi schemes, namely Hilik Tapiro's Or Fund and Amir Bramly's Kela Fund, and a boom in unregulated activity due to harsh regulation on the one hand and the low interest rate on the other Hauser has taken steps to prevent unregulated offerings to the public. These including warning the public of risks, stern public speeches likening unregulated investment to a jungle, and prohibiting publication of financial details, including expected return, on any unregulated investment without issuing a prospectus

In 2017, Hauser nominated two another committees – on the need to regulate ICO's. He himself was appointed to co-chair a committee by the Minister of Finance and Minister of Justice on the need of a secondary exchange in Israel for SMEs.

Prof. Hauser also instigated reliefs on IPOs, giving companies issuing for the first time on the Stock Exchange a "Joining Basket", a 5-year benefits plan from the date of issue. During that time, these companies would enjoy considerable regulatory reliefs in order to make it easier for them to adapt to the process of becoming a reporting corporation. He also initiated another reform of regulation to encourage IPO's of High tech firms and another reform to encourage public financing SMEs.

In February 2016 Hauser's term was extended by the Minister of Finance, Moshe Kahlon, with additional three years.

In March 2016, the Securities Authority under prof. Hauser initiated prohibition of offering Binary Options to local Israeli investors. Hauser expressed his disgust at the phenomena and called on the Attorney General of Israel to act. In the wake of these regulatory measures, a number of companies trading abroad closed down their operations in Israel. Meanwhile, the ISA drafted a law in early 2017 that was approved by Israel's cabinet in June 2017, banning the sale of binary options overseas by online trading firms based in Israel. The law was finally approved by the Knesset in October 2017.

In 2017, professor Hauser led a process to demutualize at the Tel-Aviv Stock Exchange, in accordance to the structural change undergone by all Stock Exchanges around the world in modern times. Hauser is also promoting the supervision upon electronic trading systems. Recently, The Knesset approved a bill aimed to ensure that operating and marketing of trading systems. would be conducted fairly, while the customers' money would be safeguarded. By 2016, the licensing process has ended and today there are six companies with a license for a forex trading platforms.

In November 2017, he announced he would step down for his role in ISA in the beginning of 2018.

In December 2017 Hauser said ISA is considering the ban of cryptocurrency related companies from the Tel-Aviv Stock exchange.

== Recognition and awards ==
In 2006, he won the Ben-Gurion University outstanding scientist award.

Hauser was chosen by Globes as one of the ten most influential people on Israeli economy for 2013.

During his term, the ISA was awarded with the Minister of Justice prize for Governmental Transparency in 2015. During the ceremony, the Minister Ayelet Shaked said: "The Securities Authority, under the leadership of prof. Hauser, demonstrates to us all how a public authority can embed profound principles of transparency and conduct itself constantly and systematically with transparency of the highest standard".

Hauser was ranked 8th among the 100 most influential people of 2017 in Israel by TheMarker newspaper.
