= Zvi Arad =

Israeli mathematician

- צבי ארד
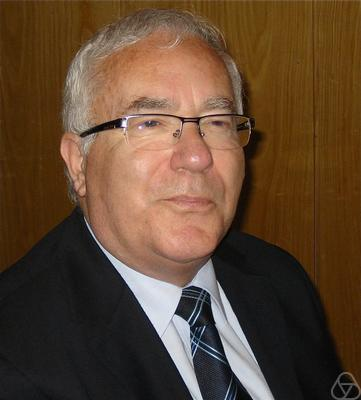
- Zvi Arad (2008)
- Born: April 16, 1942; Petah Tikva, Mandatory Palestine
- Died: February 4, 2018 (aged 75); Petah Tikva, Israel
- Occupation: mathematician
- Known for: Acting President of Bar-Ilan University; President of Netanya Academic College

Zvi Arad (Hebrew: צבי ארד; 16 April 1942, in Petah Tikva, Mandatory Palestine – 4 February 2018, in Petah Tikva, Israel) was an Israeli mathematician, acting president of Bar-Ilan University, and president of Netanya Academic College.

== Biography ==
Zvi Arad began his academic studies in the Mathematics Department of Bar-Ilan University. He received his first degree in 1964 and after army service went on to complete a second and third degree in the Mathematics Department of Tel Aviv University.

== Academic career ==
In 1968 Arad joined the academic staff at Bar-Ilan University as an assistant and in 1983 was appointed a full professor. During the years 1978/9 he held the position of visiting scientist at the University of Chicago, and from 1982 to 1983 held the position of visiting professor at the University of Toronto.

Arad held a variety of senior academic posts at Bar-Ilan University. He served as chairman of the Mathematics and Computer Science Department, dean of the Faculty of Natural Sciences and Mathematics, rector and president of the university (succeeding Ernest Krausz, and followed by Shlomo Eckstein). Together with Professor Bernard Pinchuk he founded Gelbart Institute, an international research institute named after Abe Gelbart, and the Emmy Noether Institute (Minerva Center). Together with colleagues he established a journal, the Israel Mathematics Conference Proceedings, distributed by the American Mathematical Society (AMS). From 1984–1985 he served as a member of the Council for Higher Education of the State of Israel. In 1982 he was elected a member of Russia's Academy of Natural Sciences.

From 1994 he served on the editorial board of the Algebra Colloquium, a journal of the Chinese Academy of Sciences published by Springer-Verlag. He also serves on the editorial board of various international publications: South East Asian Bulletin of Mathematics of the Asian Mathematical Society, the IMCP of Contemporary Mathematics published by the American Mathematical Society, and the publication Cubo Matemática Educacional, Temuco, Chile.

He initiated numerous agreements of cooperation with universities and institutions throughout the world including academic institutes in the former Soviet Union, universities and research centers in America, Canada, Germany, the United Kingdom, Italy, Russia, China, South Africa, etc.

He was a member of Israel's first official delegation to the former USSR, under the leadership of President Ezer Weizman. In an official address, President Mikhail Gorbachev mentioned Professor Arad's contributions towards the establishment of scientific communications between Israel and the former USSR. In an effort to advance cooperation in research he has headed delegations of scientists to Russia, China, and East Germany.

Haaretz newspaper (January 21, 1998) described him as one of the pioneers of higher education reform in Israel. The Encyclopaedia Hebraica lists Zvi Arad as "fulfilling a key role in the development and advancement of Bar-Ilan University and in the establishment of the University's regional colleges in Safed, Ashkelon and the Jordan Valley)." For this achievement he was awarded a certificate of honor by the mayor of each city. The establishment of these colleges began in 1985 and went on to affect the whole of Israel. These colleges advanced the Galilee and Southern Israel and brought higher education to the peripheries of Israel.

== Netanya Academic College ==
In 1994, at the request of the mayors of the city of Netanya, Yoel Elroi and Zvi Poleg, Arad established the Netanya Academic College. He served as president of the college for 24 years. A partner in the initiation and establishment of the college was Miriam Feirberg, who at that time served as head of the Education Department of the City of Netanya. Today the college is an accredited institute of higher education that grant first and second academic degrees in a variety of fields.

== Published works ==
Together with his colleague Professor Marcel Herzog, Arad wrote Products of Conjugacy Classes, published by Springer-Verlag. The book facilitated the basis of the establishment of mathematical theory and today forms part of the branch of abstract algebra known as Table Algebras, and is attached to central branches in mathematics: Graph theory, algebra combinations, and theory presentation. Arad coauthored two other books on the subject of table algebra. In 2000 his book was published in the series American Mathematical Society Memoirs and in January 2002 another book on table algebras was published in the international publication, Springer. Arad was the editor of Contemporary Mathematics, Volume 402.

== See also ==
- Education in Israel
