= Journal of Nonlinear Optical Physics & Materials =

Peer-reviewed scientific journal

- Discipline: Optics, materials science
- Language: English
- Edited by: Xianfeng Chen

Publication details
- History: 1992–present
- Publisher: World Scientific
- Frequency: Quarterly
- Impact factor: 2.7 (2022)

Standard abbreviations
- ISO 4: J. Nonlinear Opt. Phys. Mater.

Indexing
- CODEN: JNOMFV
- ISSN: 0218-8635 (print); 1793-6624 (web)
- LCCN: 95648302
- OCLC no.: 634774624

Links
- Journal homepage

The Journal of Nonlinear Optical Physics & Materials is a quarterly peer-reviewed scientific journal that was established in 1992 and is published by World Scientific. It covers developments in the field of nonlinear interactions of light with matter, guided waves, and solitons, as well as their applications, such as in laser and coherent lightwave amplification, and information processing.

== Abstracting and indexing ==
The journal is abstracted and indexed in:

- Astrophysics Data System
- Chemical Abstracts Service
- Current Contents/Physical, Chemical & Earth Sciences
- EBSCO databases
- Ei Compendex
- Inspec
- ProQuest databases
- Science Citation Index Expanded
- Scopus
