= Ministry of Energy and Infrastructure (Israel) =

Government ministry of Israel

- משרד האנרגיה והתשתיות
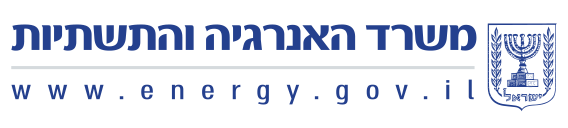

Agency overview
- Formed: 1977
- Jurisdiction: Government of Israel
- Minister responsible: Eli Cohen
- Agency executive: Yossi Dayan, Director-General
- Child agency: National Institute for Energy Storage
- Website: www.energy.gov.il

The Ministry of Energy and Infrastructure (Hebrew: משרד האנרגיה והתשתיות) is the Israeli government ministry responsible for energy and water infrastructure. The ministry has changed names several times since its establishment.

The ministerial post was established in 1977, succeeding the position of Development Ministry, which had been abolished three years earlier.

== Names ==
The Ministry of Energy has been called the following names:

- Ministry of Energy and Infrastructure (משרד האנרגיה והתשתיות) – 1977–1996
- Ministry of National Infrastructures (משרד התשתיות הלאומיות) – 1996–2011
- Ministry of Energy and Water Resources (משרד האנרגיה והמים) – 2011–2013
- Ministry of National Infrastructures, Energy and Water (משרד התשתיות הלאומיות, האנרגיה והמים) – 2013–2017
- Ministry of Energy (משרד האנרגיה) – 2017–2023
- Ministry of Energy and Infrastructure (משרד האנרגיה והתשתיות) – 2023–

== List of ministers ==
#	Minister	Party	Governments	Term start	Term end
Ministry of Energy and Infrastructure
1	Yitzhak Moda'i	Likud	18	June 20, 1977	August 5, 1981
2	Yitzhak Berman	Likud	19	August 5, 1981	September 30, 1982
–	Yitzhak Moda'i	Likud	19–20	October 19, 1982	September 13, 1984
3	Moshe Shahal	Alignment	21–23	September 13, 1984	March 15, 1990
4	Yuval Ne'eman	Tehiya	24	June 11, 1990	January 21, 1992
5	Yitzhak Shamir	Likud	24	January 21, 1992	July 13, 1992
6	Amnon Rubinstein	Meretz	25	July 13, 1992	June 7, 1993
–	Moshe Shahal	Labor Party	25	July 13, 1992	January 9, 1995
7	Gonen Segev	Yiud	25, 26	January 9, 1995	June 18, 1996
Minister of National Infrastructure
8	Yitzhak Levy	National Religious Party	27	June 18, 1996	July 8, 1996
9	Ariel Sharon	Likud	27	July 8, 1996	July 6, 1999
10	Eli Suissa	Shas	28	July 6, 1999	July 11, 2000
11	Avraham Shochat	One Israel	28	October 11, 2000	March 7, 2001
12	Avigdor Lieberman	Yisrael Beiteinu	29	March 7, 2001	March 14, 2002
13	Effi Eitam	National Religious Party	29	September 18, 2002	February 28, 2003
14	Yosef Paritzky	Shinui	30	February 28, 2003	July 13, 2004
15	Eliezer Sandberg	Shinui	30	July 19, 2004	December 4, 2004
16	Binyamin Ben-Eliezer	Labor Party	30	January 10, 2005	November 23, 2005
17	Roni Bar-On	Kadima	30	January 18, 2006	May 4, 2006
–	Binyamin Ben-Eliezer	Labor Party	31	May 4, 2006	March 31, 2009
Minister of Energy and Water
18	Uzi Landau	Yisrael Beiteinu	32	31 March 2009	18 March 2013
Minister of National Infrastructure, Energy, and Water
19	Silvan Shalom	Likud	33	18 March 2013	14 May 2015
20	Yuval Steinitz	Likud	34, 35	14 May 2015	13 June 2021
21	Karine Elharrar	Yesh Atid	36	13 June 2021	29 December 2022
22	Israel Katz	Likud	37	29 December 2022	1 January 2024
23	Eli Cohen	Likud	37	1 January 2024	

=== Deputy ministers ===
#	Minister	Party	Governments	Term start	Term end
1	Naomi Blumenthal	Likud	29	7 March 2001	1 January 2003
