= Albeck (surname) =

Albeck is a surname. Notable people with the surname include:

- Amnon Albeck, (born 1958) Israeli chemist
- Andy Albeck (1921–2010), American film studio executive
- Hanoch Albeck (1890–1972), Israeli Talmudist
- Michael Albeck (born 1934), Israeli chemist; President of Bar-Ilan University
- Stan Albeck (1931–2021), American basketball coach

== See also ==
- Rachel Albeck-Gidron (born 1960), Israeli multidisciplinary researcher
