= Tehila Matmon =

Israeli attorney, publisher, and women's rights activist (1899–1974)

- תהלה מטמון
- Born: April 1, 1899; Rudky, Kingdom of Galicia and Lodomeria, Austria-Hungary
- Died: March 1974 (aged 74)
- Occupation: Attorney

Tehila Matmon (Hebrew: תהלה מטמון; April 1, 1899 – March 1974) was an Israeli attorney, publisher, and women's rights activist.

Tehila Matmon was born on April 1, 1899, in Rudky, Austrian Galicia (present-day Ukraine). After completing her secondary education, she worked as a clerk and studied law and economics in Lwów, Poland (present-day Lviv, Ukraine). Emigrating to Palestine in 1933, Matmon was a member of several organizations, including the Haganah, and represented mostly women in legal proceedings. In 1934, she married the sexologist Avraham Matmon. The Matmons worked out of their home in Tel Aviv, practicing law and medicine from different rooms.

Matmon published The Woman in the State (Hebrew: האשה במדינה, romanized: Ha'ishah bamedinah), one of the first Hebrew-language journals advocating for Israeli women's rights, from 1949–1953. The journal included "news items, reports and articles on the legal and judicial status of women". It also featured editorials by Matmon.

Matmon died in March 1974.

== Sources ==
- Geva, Sharon (2019). "Ahead of its Time: Ha'ishah bamedinah—The Story of a Forgotten Women's Journal in Israel". Nashim (34): 98–122. JSTOR 10.2979/nashim.34.1.05.
- Tidhar, David (1961). "עו"ד תהלה מטמון" [Attorney Tehila Matmon]. Encyclopedia of the Founders and Builders of Israel (in Hebrew). Vol. 11. New York, NY: Touro University. p. 3722. Archived from the original on January 14, 2026.
