= Pinchas Kehati =

Polish-Israeli Orthodox rabbi and educator

Rabbi Pinchas Kehati
- פנחס קהתי
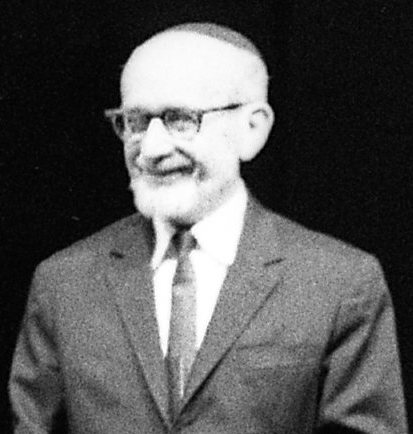
- Pinchas Kehati, 1969

Personal life
- Born: 1910 Near Rivne, Volhynia, Poland
- Died: December 21, 1976 (aged 65–66) Israel
- Parent(s): Kehat and Malka Gechtman
- Known for: Mishnayot Mevoarot ("Kehati Mishnayot"), commentary on the Mishnah
- Occupation: Rabbi, teacher, author

Religious life
- Religion: Judaism
- Denomination: Orthodox

Jewish leader
- Awards: Rav Kook Prize (1967)

Pinchas Kehati (Hebrew: פינחס קהתי; 1910 – December 21, 1976) was a Polish-Israeli rabbi, teacher, and author. He is best known as the author of Mishnayot Mevoarot (Hebrew: משניות מבוארות, "Explained Mishnayot", popularly known as "the Kehati Mishnayot") which is a commentary and elucidation on the entire Mishnah written in Modern Hebrew.

== Biography ==
Kehati was born Pinchas Gechtman in a village near Rivne in Volhynia, Poland. His parents Kehat and Malka Gechtman were killed in the Holocaust. In his youth he studied in religious and religious Zionist schools, and received rabbinical ordination from the "Tachkemoni" rabbinical school in Warsaw; he was also a leader of the Zionist youth movement Hashomer Hadati in Warsaw.

He made aliyah in 1935 (or 1936) and began studies of mathematics, Physics, Religious philosophy and Kabbalah at Hebrew University, but was forced to abandon them due to financial difficulties. He initially worked as a teacher and with HaPoel HaMizrachi. Later, for many years, he worked as a teller in Bank Mizrachi. He was very involved with Bnei Akiva (successor to Hashomer Hadati) and published guidance booklets for them.

In 1953, he was appointed to a working committee for Hapoel HaMizrachi and took responsibility for its youth division, along with his responsibilities for guiding youth for Bnei Akiva organization. He had the idea to publish a daily pamphlet with commentary on the day's Mishnah being studied as part of the Mishna Yomit cycle (two mishnayot per day). He originally asked several other people to write the commentary, but was dissatisfied with the results. On his wife's suggestion, Kehati began to write the commentary himself.

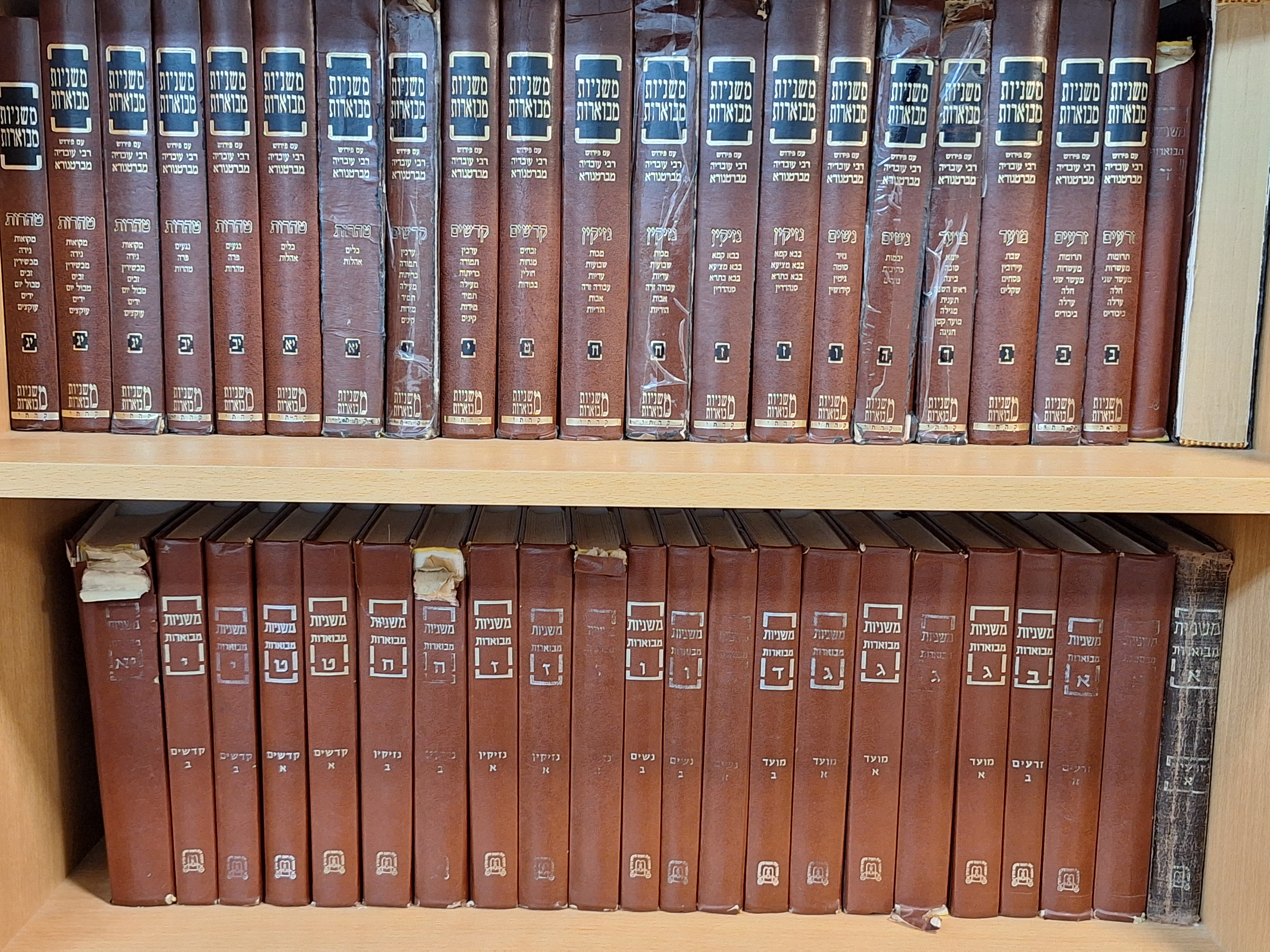
Set of Mishna Kehati: modern print on top row; old format beneath

The commentary was printed beginning in early 1955. Initially a single page was printed each day, covering two mishnayot. Later, the format switched to a weekly pamphlet covering 14 mishnayot. Initially, Kehati bore all the costs with no external funding. However, after eight months this became overwhelming, and he was forced to stop. Soon external donors appeared to support the project. Work resumed, and the commentary to the entire Mishnah was finished in 1963. In 1967, he was awarded the Rav Kook Prize from the Tel Aviv-Yafo Municipality for his commentary on the Mishnah.

The religious Zionist organization Ne'emanei Torah Va'Avodah has encouraged the Israeli religious schools administration to have Kehati's life studied by students in primary schools, as in their opinion he would serve as a great role model for young Israeli children.

The Kehati commentary has had a tremendous impact on the modern study of Mishnah in Jewish communities, as his commentary has been used in many different settings. It provides detailed notes for beginners that are lucid in Hebrew and have been translated into English. By continuing to work in a bank as he composed his commentary on the Mishna, Kehati stayed true to the fundamental Bnei Akiva Zionist ideology of Torah and Avodah, or Torah and Work, which was a fundamental tenet of early religious Zionists.

On the encouragement of the Lubavitcher Rebbe, he began to produce a similar commentary on the Torah, but this did not succeed.

Kehati also composed tunes for traditional Jewish songs.

He died in 1976.

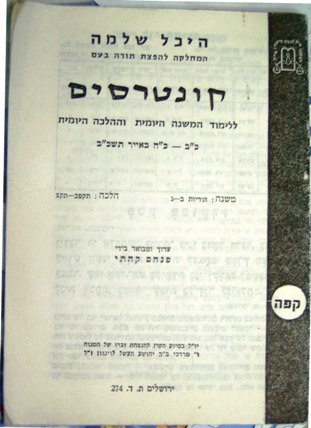
Original Kehati pamphlet for learning Mishanayot

== Commentary ==
In response to the growing demand for a commentary of the Mishnah in Modern Hebrew, Kehati was sponsored by the Bnei Akiva of Bnei Brak to develop a commentary. Kehati wanted to spread Torah throughout the world, so he sought to write a clear, concise, and easy-to-read commentary and elucidation on the entire Mishnah.

Photocopy of the Kehati First Edition with attribution to the co-author

Between 1955 and 1964, Kehati published a weekly pamphlet which was hand-delivered to 5,000 subscribers. In each pamphlet, he explicated 14 Mishnayot (two per day), two laws from the Shulchan Aruch, two laws from Maimonides, and a selection from Tanakh. The first pamphlets contained commentaries that Kehati compiled from local yeshiva students. Frustrated at the inconsistencies in the commentary quality and approach, Kehati hired Rabbi Zvi A. Yehuda, who taught Mishnah on an Israel Broadcasting Service (Kol Israel) radio program, to help develop a consistent approach to his commentary. Between 1956 and 1959, approximately 150 of pamphlets included attribution to his co-author. The first book-edition of the Kehati Mishnah includes this attribution (see image). Many editions have since been published after Kehati's death in 1976. Recent editions also include the traditional Bartenura commentary, improving its appeal to the Haredi community. Even though Kehati was a Religious Zionist, his works can be found in many Haredi homes and synagogues.

This work was translated into English and published in 1994 as The Mishnah, a new translation with a commentary by Pinhas Kehati (edited by Avner Tomaschoff).

=== Comparison to other commentaries ===
Kehati's Mishnah commentary was written in Modern Hebrew, the book cover design used a modish font and color, and it lacked decorative edge-marbling. The page layout of the Kehati commentary mimics the layout found in Dr. Symcha Petrushka's Yiddish Mishnah commentary (published in Montreal, 1946). It has also been observed that entire sections of Kehati's commentary amount to a word-for-word Hebrew translation of Petrushka, without attribution. Both Kehati and Petrushka were raised in Warsaw and became involved with Religious Zionism.

== External links and References ==
- Tidhar, David (1947). "Pinchas Kehati (Gechnman) [misspelled]" פנחס קהתי (גכנמן). Encyclopedia of the Founders and Builders of Israel (in Hebrew). Vol. 18. Estate of David Tidhar and Touro College Libraries. p. 5419.
- Retrospective on the 30th year since his passing (Hebrew), kipa.co.il
- . Published online as part of a study program of two Mishnayot per day. Currently inactive, but archives contain the complete text of Kehati in English for Moed, Nashim, Nezikin, and about half of Kodashim.
