= Sender Trovitz =

Community leader in Safed

- סנדר טרוביץ
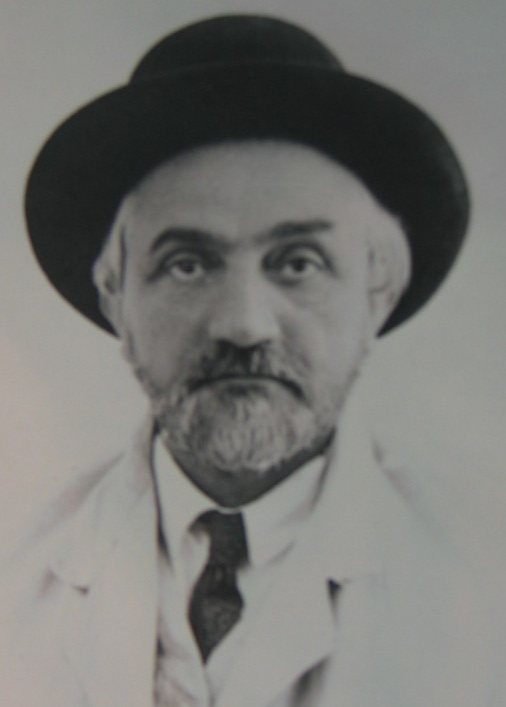
- Born: December 15, 1877 (30 Kislev 5638); Uman, Russian Empire
- Died: April 29, 1940 (21 Nissan 4700); Safed, Mandatory Palestine
- Occupations: Merchant, civic leader
- Known for: First Jewish Hospital in Safed; Food Kitchen and Orphanage for the poor; citizen representative to the British and Ottoman Turkish authorities
- Spouse: Feiga "Tzippora" Constantiner
- Children: 7
- Parent(s): Rabbi Natan and Leah Trovitz

Sender Trovitz (Hebrew: סנדר טרוביץ) was a merchant, civic leader and philanthropist in Safed in the 1900s. He was a founder and trustee of Safed’s first modern hospital. He represented Jewish community interests to the Ottoman Empire and British Mandate authorities.

== Early life and emigration to Safed ==
Sender Trovitz was born in 1877. His parents, Rabbi Natan and Leah Trovitz, lived in Uman, then part of the Russian Empire (now in Ukraine), the birthplace of Rabbi Nachman of Breslov, and the center of their Breslov Hasidic community. When he was two months old, his parents undertook a six-month journey to make Aliyah to Safed, then part of the Ottoman Empire.

== Merchant and civic leader ==
He became a businessman, banker, and civic leader of Safed. He served as chair of the Jewish Store Owners Committee. Fluent in Hebrew, Arabic and English, he represented the Safed community to the Ottoman and British authorities during the British Mandate period. He was a founder of Hevrat Harchavat Hayishuv (Hebrew: 'The Settlement Expansion Company') a local settlement and construction association which helped establish new communities in the Upper Galilee and was part of the group that established the agricultural community of Ein Zeitim. He participated in the founding and management of the Ezrat HaGalil ('Hebrew: Aid to the Galil) Free Kitchen and Orphanage to help the poor Jewish, Christian and Muslim children of Safed and the region.

== Founder and trustee of the Rothschild Hospital ==
In the early 1900s, the only source of inpatient care for Safed and the surrounding community was the small Scottish Hospital which was owned and staffed by Christian missionary physicians. Trovitz was among the leaders of Safed who helped convince the Rothschild family to jointly finance with the city its first modern, Jewish-owned and operated hospital. With the approaching first World War, the remaining Christian missionary physicians began departing. In 1909, construction began on the Rothschild Hospital accompanied by municipal fundraising. Those who contributed received a hospital donation certificate which included the name of Sender Trovitz as one of its founders and trustees.

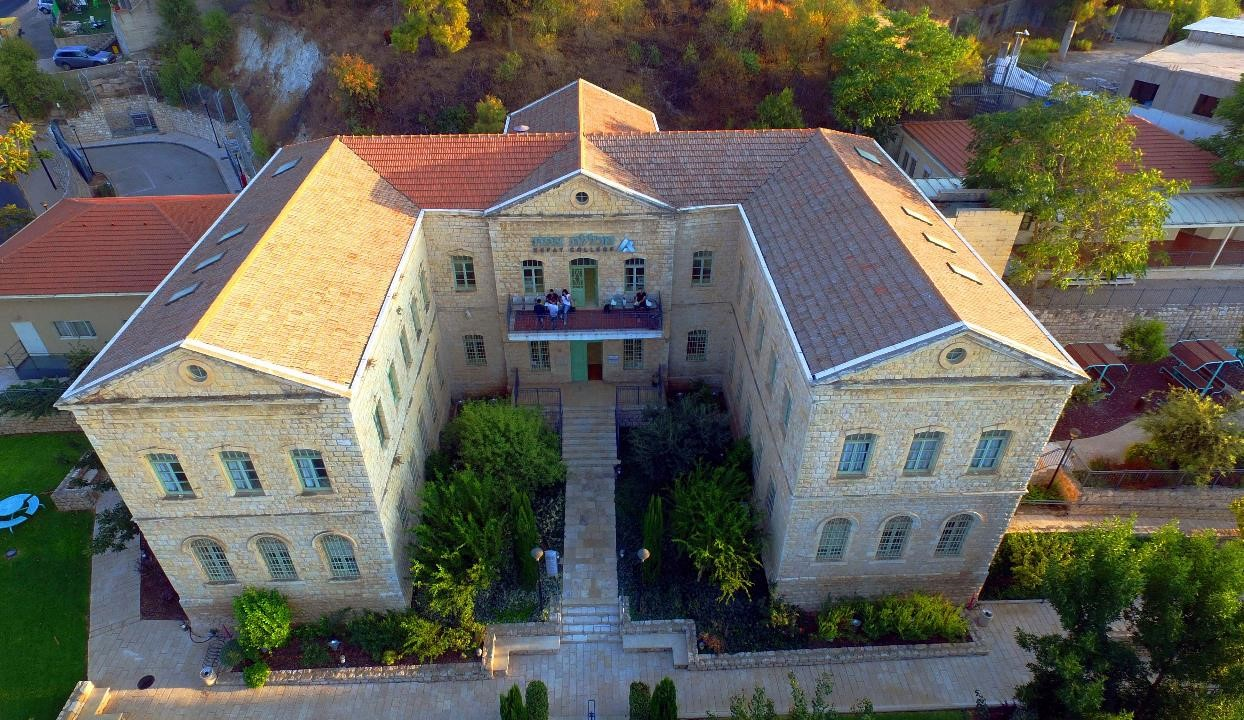
The Rothschild Hospital, now part of the Zefat Academic College

The Rothschild Hospital opened in 1912, just as the Scottish hospital closed its doors. During World War I, the hospital served the residents of Safed and surrounding communities as local battles, typhus epidemics, and severe food shortages impacted the Northern Galilee. The Hadassah organization assumed responsibility for the hospital’s operation from the end of World War I through the 1948 War of Independence, until the Rothschild-Hadassah Hospital was replaced by Safed’s Ziv Medical Center and Regional Hospital in 1973.

== Life and the later years in Safed ==
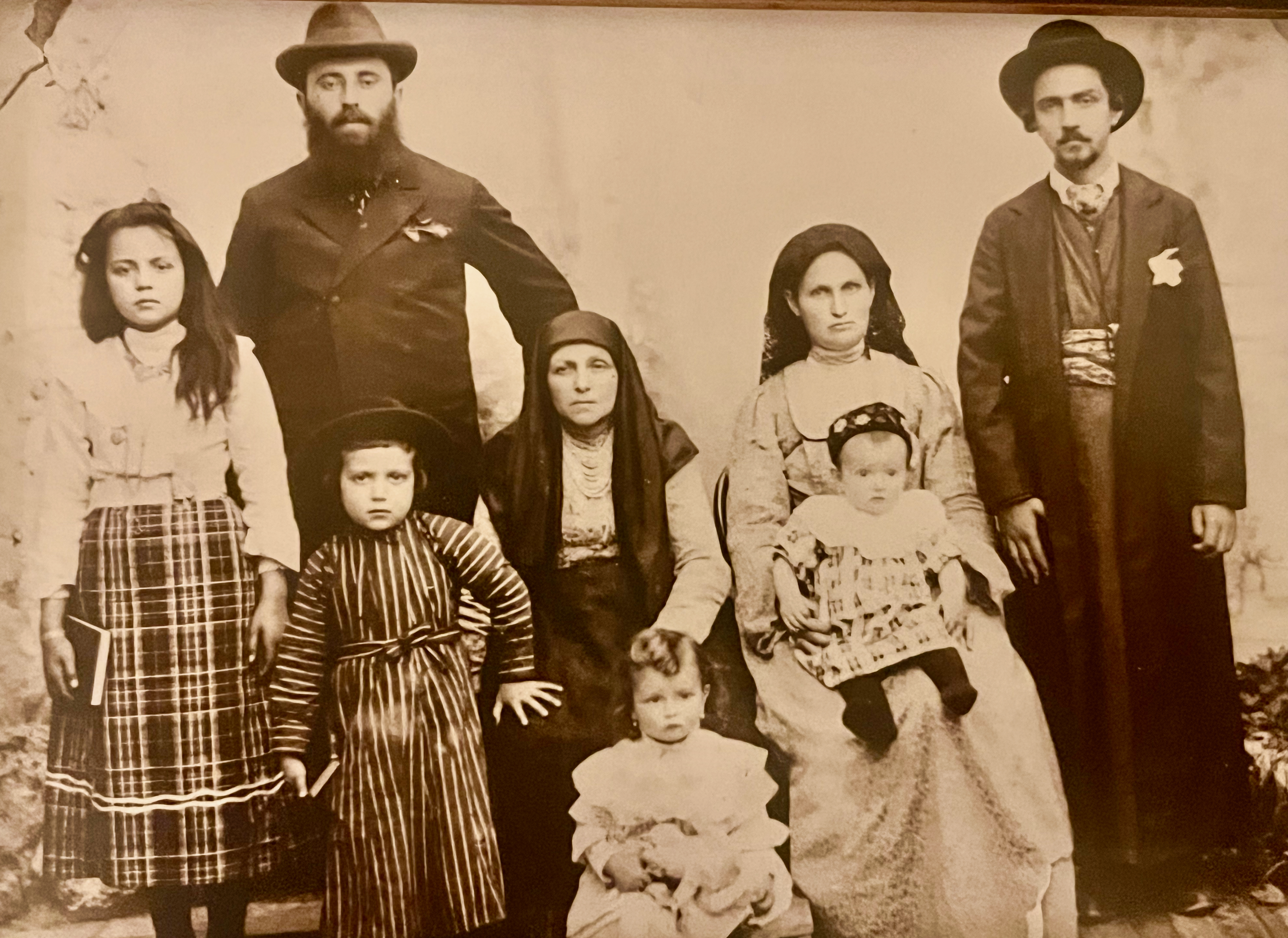
The Trovitz Family in Safed, c. 1906. Sender Trovitz (29) on the right with his wife Feiga (seated). His father Natan and mother Leah (seated). Sender and Feiga's children Chana Rahel, Menachem, Esther and Devorah (on Feiga's lap).

Trovitz formed an alliance between the merchant leaders and the Religious Zionists of Safed to develop the future state of Israel by building new communities around Safed and the Northern Galilee. His main religious partner was Nachum Etrog, the Chief Ashkenazi Rabbi of Safed, who was close friends and a Religious Zionist political ally of Abraham Isaac Kook, the Chief Rabbi of Palestine during the British Mandate.

He and his wife Feiga raised seven children. The Trovitz home by the Kikar Miginim ("Defenders Square") and the Ari Ashkenazi Synagogue served as a guest house, community meeting place, and early Breslov Hasidic synagogue. He died in 1940, during World War II. He was buried with Feiga and his parents in Safed’s historic cemetery.

In 2009, a permanent exhibit with archives on the Etrog - Trovitz family was opened at the Beit Hameiri Historical Museum in Safed. Trovitz was selected for inclusion in the Encyclopedia of the Founders and Builders of Israel.
