= Albeck =

Albeck may refer to:

- Albeck (surname)
- Albeck, Carinthia, a town in Austria
