= Moshe ben Machir =

Rabbi and kabbalist of Safed

Moshe ben Machir (or Moshe ben Yehudah haMachiri; Hebrew: משה בן מכיר) was rabbi and kabbalist of Safed who lived in the 16th century. He is primarily known as the author of the book Seder haYom, source of the Modeh Ani prayer.

== Biography ==
He was the head of a yeshiva in Ein Zeitim, just north of Safed. There survive fundraising letters the yeshiva sent abroad between 1598 and 1601, which show it to have the typical structure of a Sephardic yeshiva from this period, with a circle of talmidei hachamim led by a rabbi known as the "Rishon" (first) or "Hacham" (wise one). From the letters and from a manuscript of the yeshiva's rules, it can be seen that the yeshiva was influenced by the intensely spiritual atmosphere and messianic tension which prevailed among the Jews of Safed in that period, and put a focus on repentance and ascetic practices. Unlike other nearby scholarly circles (like those of rabbis Shlomo Alkabetz, Isaac Luria, Hayyim Vital, and Elazar Azikri), his yeshiva focused on traditional study of Talmud and halacha rather than mystical secrets.

The manuscript of the yeshiva's rules contains ten rules. One rule established shifts so that Torah would be studied in the yeshiva at all hours of day and night. Another specified regular visits to the grave of Rabbi Judah bar Ilai to pray "for all Israel".

The yeshiva apparently was located in Ein Zeitim starting in the Hebrew year 5342 (1582), and relocated to Safed after being threatened by a "band of Ishmaelites" in 1601.

== Seder haYom ==
Seder haYom is a halachic-kabbalistic work which describes, according to its introduction, "the order one should follow in his days and nights, on Shabbats and holidays, the order of the entire year when sitting at home and walking on the way, when retiring and rising". It was first printed in 1599 in Venice, and again in 1605 in Venice. It is the source of many currently practiced customs, including the Modeh Ani prayer.
