= Mishnah =

First major written collection of the Oral Torah

The Mishnah (/ˈmɪʃnə/; Hebrew: מִשְׁנָה, romanized: mišnā, lit. 'study by repetition', from the verb לִשְׁנוֹת lišnot, "to repeat") is the first written collection of the Jewish oral traditions. These oral traditions are known as the "Oral Torah", to differentiate them from the (written) Torah, and both are believed in rabbinic tradition to have been revealed alongside each other to Moses at Mount Sinai. While the Torah was passed down in writing, the Oral Torah is believed to have been transmitted by Jewish scholars until the compilation of the Mishnah in the late second or early third century CE. The Mishnah is viewed as authoritative and binding revelation by most Orthodox Jews and some non-Orthodox Jews. The Mishnah is also the basis of the Babylonian Talmud and the Jerusalem Talmud, which are both commentaries on the Mishnah.

According to tradition, the Mishnah arose during the persecution of Jews in the late second or early third century. Fearing that these events would lead to the oral traditions of the Second Temple period (516 BCE – 70 CE) being forgotten, Judah ha-Nasi compiled the Mishnah in its current form, either in Beit Shearim or in Sepphoris. It was mainly written in Mishnaic Hebrew, but some parts are also in Jewish Aramaic. The oldest surviving physical fragments are from the 6th to 7th centuries.

== Etymology ==
Mishnah comes from the verb shanah, which means "to repeat", "to study", "to heed oral instruction", or "to teach".

== Authorship ==
Traditional accounts, especially the Iggeret of Sherira Gaon, credit Judah ha-Nasi ("Judah the Prince") with the final redaction and publication of the Mishnah, including arranging the Mishnah from earlier tannaitic traditions. Modern scholarship likewise treats the Mishnah as a redacted collection rather than a work composed at a single moment. Although Judah's redaction became authoritative, the received text appears to contain some later additions or supplements. Examples commonly cited include the end of tractate Sotah, which refers retrospectively to Judah ha-Nasi’s death, and traditions associated with Judah II, Judah ha-Nasi’s grandson, such as the ruling permitting oil prepared by non-Jews.

The Babylonian Talmud preserves a tradition that the anonymous rulings in the Mishnah can be attributed to the school of Rabbi Akiva, especially his pupil Rabbi Meir. This tradition was cited by Sherira Gaon's account of the development of the Mishnah. However, modern scholars treat this tradition as evidence for earlier collections and schools of thought, instead of proof of authorship going back to individual rabbis.

Scholars have also debated the relative role of written aides and oral traditions in the formation of the Mishnah; these modes were not necessarily mutually exclusive.

== Structure ==
=== Division ===
The Mishnah is arranged by subject matter, and is divided into six "orders" (sedarim, singular seder סדר). More often referring to the entire Talmud, the Mishnah may also be called the Shas (meaning "Six Orders"). Tradition attributes this division back to its author, Judah Ha-Nasi.

Except for Zeraim, the orders are arranged from longest (in number of chapters) to shortest. A popular mnemonic for these orders is the acronym "Z'MaN NaKaT".

Each order contains 7–12 tractates (masechtot, singular masechet מסכת; lit. "web"), 63 in total. Tractates are divided into chapters (perakim, singular perek) and then paragraphs (mishnayot, singular mishnah). In this last context, the word mishnah means a single paragraph of the work, i.e. the smallest unit of structure, leading to the use of the plural, "Mishnayot", for the whole work.

According to the Babylonian Talmud, Hagigah 14a:9, there were originally six to seven hundred orders of the Mishnah, with only six surviving to the present.

=== The Six Orders ===
- Order 1: Zeraim (Seeds)
  - dealing with prayer and blessings, tithes and agricultural laws (11 tractates)
- Order 2: Moed (Festival)
  - about the laws of the Sabbath and the Festivals (12 tractates)
- Order 3: Nashim (Women)
  - concerning marriage and divorce, some forms of oaths and the laws of the nazirite (7 tractates)
- Order 4: Nezikin (Damages)
  - dealing with civil and criminal law, the functioning of the courts and oaths (10 tractates)
- Order 5: Kodashim (Holy items)
  - regarding sacrificial rites, the Temple, and the dietary laws (11 tractates) and
- Order 6: Tohorot (Purities)
  - pertaining to the laws of purity and impurity, including the impurity of the dead, food purity, and bodily purity (12 tractates)

== Content and purpose ==
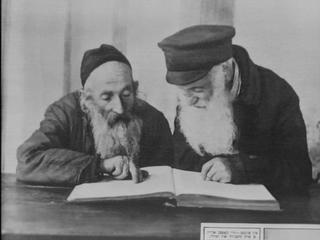
Mishna study, Pinsk 1924

The goal of the Mishnah is to enable the everyday practice of the 613 Commandments of the Torah and allow them to guide all aspects of human living, a task that became increasingly needed in Jewish life since the destruction of the Second Temple in 70 CE.

=== Oral law ===
Before the publication of the Mishnah, Jewish scholarship and judgement were predominantly oral, as according to the Talmud, it was not permitted to write them down. The earliest recorded oral law may have been of the midrashic form, in which halakhic discussion is structured as exegetical commentary on the Torah, with the oldest surviving written material dating to the 6th to 7th centuries CE. Rabbis expounded on and debated the Tanakh without the benefit of written works (other than the Biblical books themselves). However, some may have made private notes (מגילות סתרים) for example of court decisions. The oral traditions were far from monolithic and varied among various schools, the most famous of which were the Houses of Hillel and Shammai.

After the First Jewish–Roman War in 70 CE, with the end of the Second Temple center in Jerusalem, Jewish social and legal norms were in upheaval. The rabbis faced the new reality of Judaism without a Temple to serve as the center of teaching and study and a Judea without autonomy. During this period, Rabbinic discourse began to be recorded in writing. The possibility was felt that the details of the oral traditions of the Pharisees from the Second Temple period (530s BCE / 3230s AM – 70 CE/ 3830 AM) would be forgotten, so the justification was found to have these oral laws transcribed.

Over time, different traditions of the Oral Law came into being, raising problems of interpretation. According to the Mevo Hatalmud, many rulings were given in a specific context but would be taken out of it, or a verdict was revisited, but the second ruling would not become popularly known. To correct this, Judah the Prince took up the redaction of the Mishnah. If a point was of no conflict, he kept its language; where there was conflict, he reordered the opinions and ruled and clarified where context was not given. The idea was not to use his discretion but to examine the tradition as far back as he could and only supplement as required.

=== The Mishnah and the Torah ===
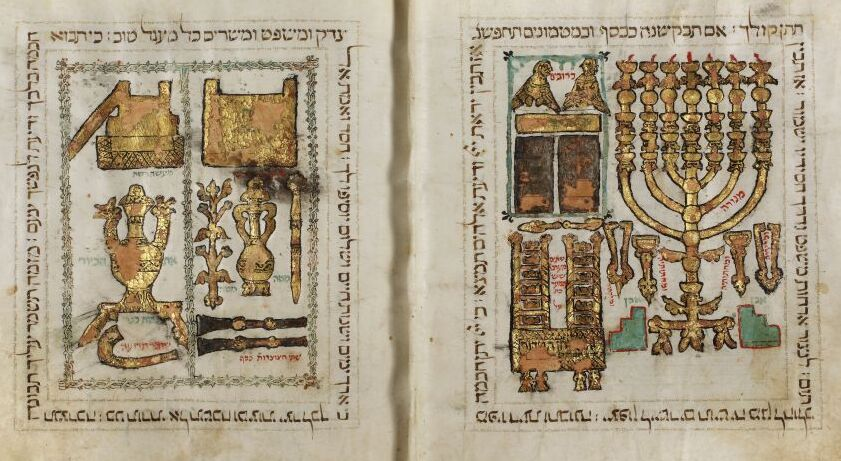
11th century mishnah codex, Biblioteca Palatina, Parma

According to Rabbinic Judaism, when the Written Torah was revealed to Moses at Mount Sinai, it was also accompanied by an Oral Torah, an authoritative oral tradition transmitted through the ages by the sages. Rabbinic sources present this oral tradition as the basis for interpreting and applying the Written Torah, and sometimes as necessary even for its proper reading and liturgical performance. Later rabbinic teaching could also be conceptualized as part of what had already been revealed at Sinai, even when articulated by sages of subsequent generations.

Much of the Mishnah formulates rabbinic law connected with biblical commandments, but it usually presents its rulings as independent legal traditions rather than deriving them explicitly from biblical verses. For this reason, the Mishnah is arranged topically, by orders and tractates, rather than as a running commentary on Scripture. By contrast, the tannaitic halakhic midrashim organize legal material according to the sequence of biblical verses and present many laws as arising from scriptural interpretation, although the distinction between the two genres is not absolute. Some rabbinic laws were understood as received traditions rather than as laws derived directly from Scripture, including the special category known as halakhah le-Moshe mi-Sinai ("Law given to Moses at Sinai").

== Mishnah studies ==
=== Manuscripts ===
Mostly-complete manuscripts (mss.) bolded. Each is missing pages, some of which have been replaced by later hands. The earliest extant material witness to rabbinic literature of any kind is dated to the 6th to 7th centuries CE, see Mosaic of Rehob.

Usual name	Formal designation	Place written	Period written	Description
**Kaufmann**	Hungarian Academy of Sciences Library Kaufmann ms. A50	Italy	12th–13th C.	Considered the best manuscript, it forms the base text of all critical editions. Vocalization is by a different, later hand.
**Parma A**	Biblioteca Palatina ms. Parm. 3173	Otranto, Italy	Late 11th C. Partially the work of MS Vat. ebr. 31's scribe, which MS was copied in 1072–3.	Probably the oldest mostly-complete manuscript. Palestinian-tradition orthography. About half is vocalized in the Babylonian tradition (not Babylonian diacritics).
**Cambridge / Lowe**	Cambridge University Library ms. Add. 470 (II)	Byzantine	c. 1465	A very careless copy, it is nonetheless useful where the Kaufmann text is corrupt.
Parma B	Biblioteca Palatina ms. Parm. 2596	North Africa(?)	12th C.	Tohorot only. Fully vocalized by the original scribe and contains teamim, including an early question mark.
MS "A" etc.	Scattered geniza fragments	Middle East	10th C.	The earliest manuscript fragments of the Mishna, which date to the 10th century, were discovered in the Cairo Geniza. Judith Olszowy-Schlanger has claimed that some are 9th century, but this is not generally accepted.
Yemenite ms.	National Library of Israel quarto 1336	Yemen	17–18th C.	Nezikin to Tohorot. The consonant text is dependent on early printed editions. The value of this ms. lies exclusively in the vocalization.

=== Printed editions ===
The first printed edition of the Mishnah was published in Naples. There have been many subsequent editions, including the late-19th-century Vilna edition, which is now the most widely available edition.

Several vocalized editions of the Mishnah were printed in early modern Italy, including the Venice 1737 edition of David ben Solomon Altaras, which became influential in later Italian and Sephardic printings. The Livorno editions in particular are important evidence for Sephardic traditions of Mishnah vocalization and recitation.

In printed editions of the Babylonian and Jerusalem Talmuds, the Mishnah is printed together with the corresponding Gemara, which comments on and discusses its rulings. The Mishnah text transmitted in the Talmuds is not always identical with the text transmitted in independent Mishnah manuscripts and editions; citations and discussions in the Gemara may preserve variant readings, some of which are important for reconstructing the history of the Mishnah text.

=== Critical editions ===
The nearest approach to a critical edition is that of Hanoch Albeck. There is also an edition by Yosef Qafiḥ of the Mishnah together with the commentary of Maimonides, which compares the base text used by Maimonides with the Napoles and Vilna editions and other sources.

=== Oral traditions and pronunciation ===
Many medieval manuscripts of the Mishnah are vowelized, and some of these, especially some fragments found in the Genizah, are partially annotated with Tiberian cantillation marks.

The Mishnah has also been transmitted through oral reading traditions, some of which include unique melodies or intonations. Frank Alvarez-Pereyre published a book-length ethnomusicological and linguistic study of the Aleppo tradition of Mishnah recitation, based on recorded oral performances and concerned with the rules and parameters of its oral transmission. Similar evidence for this character of rabbinic study traditions appears for Ashkenazic Talmud study, where modern Yalmudic chant has been compared with practices recorded in the in rabbinic documents found among the Cairo Genizah manuscripts.

The vocalization of the Mishnah has also been the subject of contemporary scholarship. Hanoch Yalon vocalized the Mishnah text in Hanoch Albeck's edition and later set out the principles of his vocalization in Mavo le-nikkud ha-Mishnah. Yalon's work also drew some attention to the linguistic value of vocalized manuscripts, as well as the living oral reading traditions, in the study of the Mishnaic Hebrew dialect.

Two institutes at the Hebrew University in Jerusalem, the Jewish Oral Traditions Research Center and the National Voice Archives, have collected major oral archives which hold extensive recordings of Jews chanting the Mishnah using a variety of melodies and many different kinds of pronunciation.

=== As a historical source ===
Both the Mishnah and Talmud contain little serious biographical studies of the people discussed therein, and the same tractate will conflate the points of view of many different people. Yet, sketchy biographies of the Mishnaic sages can often be constructed with historical detail from Talmudic and Midrashic sources.

It is accepted that Judah the Prince added, deleted, and rewrote his source material during the process of redacting the Mishnah between the ending of the second century and the beginning of the 3rd century CE.

Following Judah the Prince's redaction there remained a number of different versions of the Mishnah in circulation. The Mishnah used in the Babylonian rabbinic community differing markedly from that used in the Palestinian one. Indeed, within these rabbinic communities themselves there are indications of different versions being used for study. These differences are shown in divergent citations of individual Mishnah passages in the Talmud Yerushalmi and the Talmud Bavli, and in variances of medieval manuscripts and early editions of the Mishnah. The best known examples of these differences is found in J.N.Epstein's Introduction to the Text of the Mishnah (1948).

Epstein has also concluded that the period of the Amoraim was one of further deliberate changes to the text of the Mishnah, which he views as attempts to return the text to what was regarded as its original form. These lessened over time, as the text of the Mishnah became more and more regarded as authoritative.

Many modern historical scholars have focused on the timing and the formation of the Mishnah. A vital question is whether it is composed of sources which date from its editor's lifetime, and to what extent is it composed of earlier, or later sources. Are Mishnaic disputes distinguishable along theological or communal lines, and in what ways do different sections derive from different schools of thought within early Judaism? Can these early sources be identified, and if so, how? In response to these questions, modern scholars have adopted a number of different approaches.

- Some scholars hold that there has been extensive editorial reshaping of the stories and statements within the Mishnah (and later, in the Talmud). Lacking outside confirming texts, they hold that we cannot confirm the origin or date of most statements and laws, and that we can say little for certain about their authorship. In this view, the questions above are impossible to answer. See, for example, the works of Louis Jacobs, Baruch M. Bokser, Shaye J. D. Cohen, Steven D. Fraade.
- Some scholars hold that the Mishnah and Talmud have been extensively shaped by later editorial redaction, but that it contains sources which we can identify and describe with some level of reliability. In this view, sources can be identified to some extent because each era of history and each distinct geographical region has its own unique features, which one can trace and analyze. Thus, the questions above may be analyzed. See, for example, the works of Goodblatt, Lee Levine, David C. Kraemer and Robert Goldenberg.
- Some scholars hold that many or most of the statements and events described in the Mishnah and Talmud usually occurred more or less as described, and that they can be used as serious sources of historical study. In this view, historians do attempt to tease out later editorial additions leaving behind a possible historical text. See, for example, the works of Saul Lieberman, David Weiss Halivni, Avraham Goldberg and Dov Zlotnick.

== Criticism ==
Herbert Danby, the translator of the Mishnah into English, argues that the historical value of the traditions preserved in the work is debatable:

It is a matter of extreme difficulty to decide what historical value we should attach to any tradition recorded in the Mishnah. The lapse of time which may have served to obscure or distort memories of times so different; the political upheavals, changes, and confusions brought about by two rebellions and two Roman conquests; the standards esteemed by the Pharisean party (whose opinions the Mishnah records) which were not those of the Sadducean party (whose standards chiefly prevailed during the century before the destruction of Jerusalem) — these are factors which need to be given due weight in estimating the character of the Mishnah’s statements. Moreover there is much in the contents of the Mishnah that moves in an atmosphere of academic discussion pursued for its own sake, with (so it would appear) little pretence at recording historical usage: what was ideally true had a higher value in the eyes of the disputants than what once may have been actual but mistaken usage.

— Herbert Danby, "Introduction", The Mishnah (1954)

== Commentaries ==
Maimonides' Mishnah commentary in Judeo-Arabic

Bartenura Mishna commentary

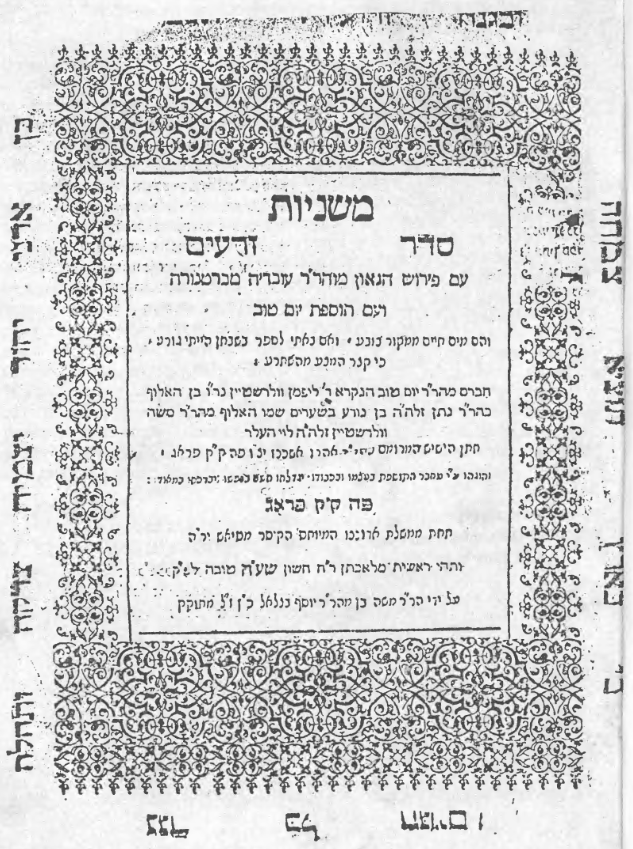
Title page of the Mishna with the Tosefet Yom Tov

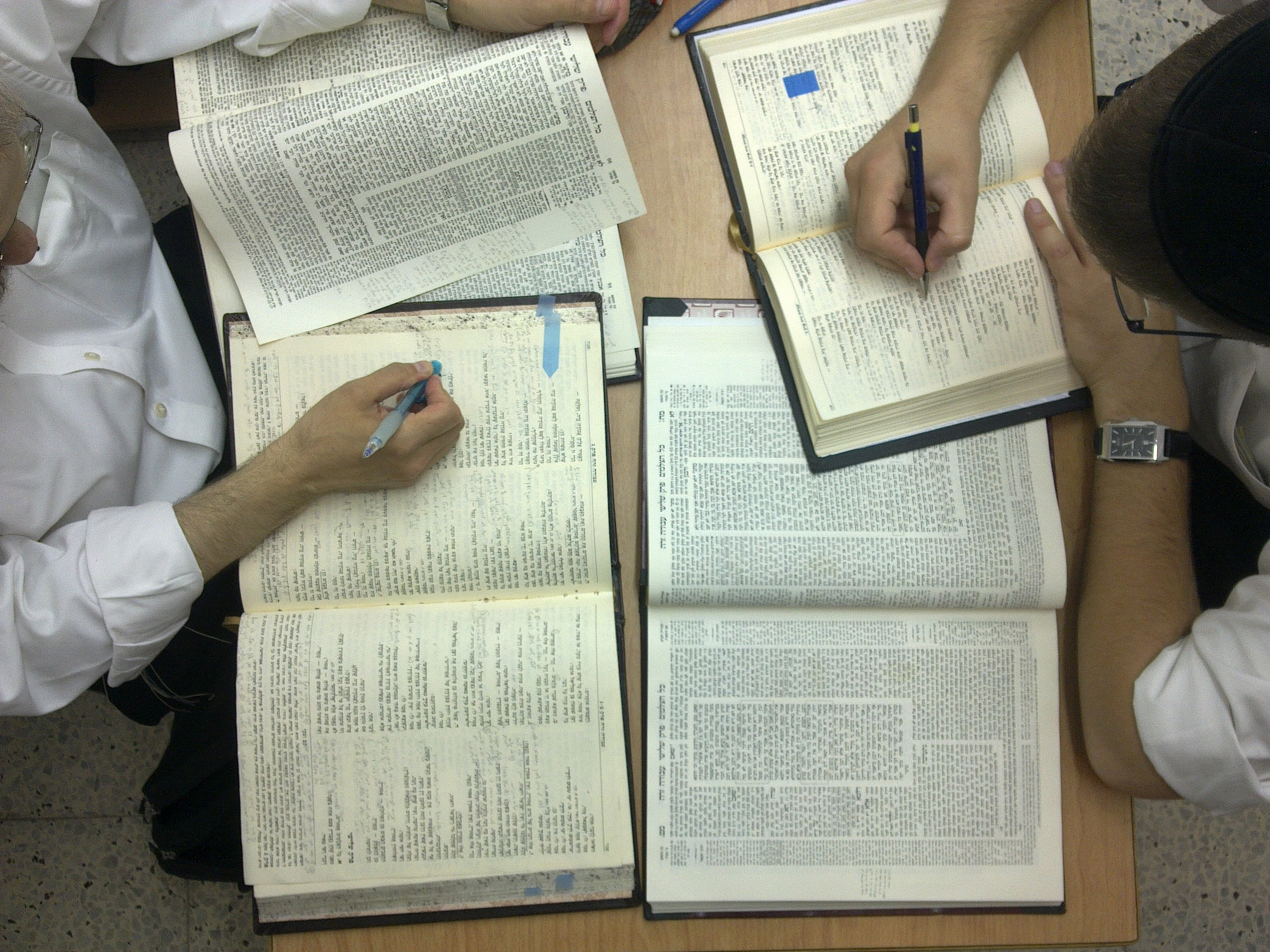
Gemara students using the Mishnah Sdura to note their summary of each sugya alongside its Mishnah

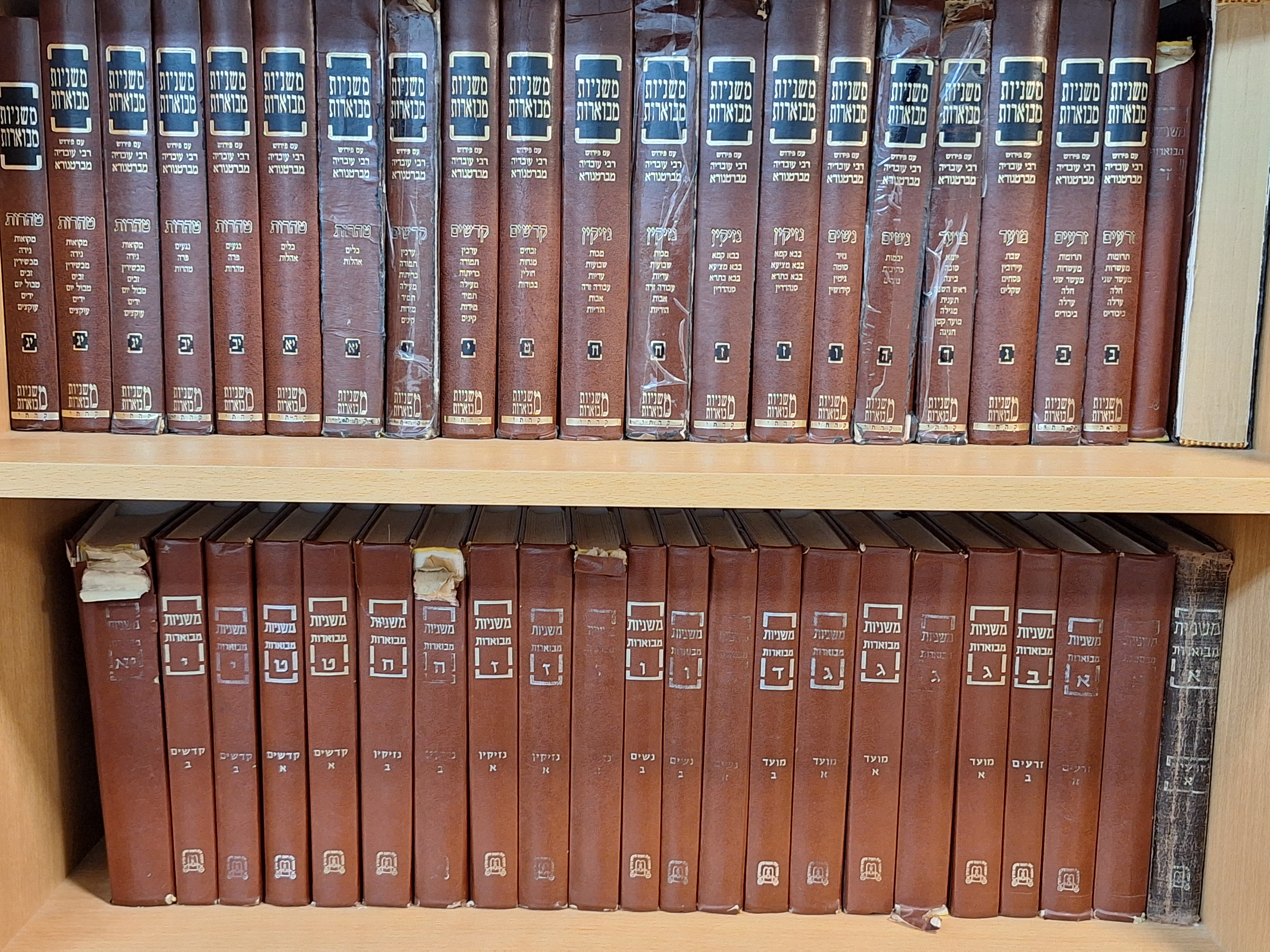
Set of Mishna Kehati: modern print on top row; old format beneath

The main work discussing the Mishnah is the Talmud, as outlined. However, the Talmud is not usually viewed as a commentary on the Mishnah per se, because: the Talmud also has many other goals; its analysis – "Gemara" – often entails long, tangential discussions; and neither version of the Talmud covers the entire Mishnah (each covers about 50–70% of the text). As a result, numerous commentaries-proper on the Mishna have been written, typically intended to allow for the study of the work without requiring direct reference to (and facility for) the Gemara.

=== List of commentaries ===
Commentaries by Rishonim:

- In 1168, Maimonides published Kitab as-Siraj "Book of the Lantern" (Arabic: كتاب السراج) a comprehensive commentary on the Mishnah. It was written in Judeo-Arabic and was one of the first commentaries of its kind. In it, Maimonides condensed the associated Talmudic debates, and offered his conclusions on a number of undecided issues. Of particular significance are the various introductory sections – as well as the introduction to the work itself – these are widely quoted in other works on the Mishnah, and on the Oral law in general. Perhaps the most famous is his introduction to the tenth chapter of tractate Sanhedrin where he enumerates the thirteen fundamental beliefs of Judaism. An (incomplete) Hebrew translation was composed by the ibn Tibbon family; a modern Hebrew translation is by Yosef Qafih.
- Samson of Sens was, apart from Maimonides, one of the few rabbis of the early medieval era to compose a Mishnah commentary on some tractates. It is printed in many editions of the Mishnah. It is interwoven with his commentary on major parts of the Tosefta.
- Asher ben Jehiel's commentary on some tractates
- Menachem Meiri's commentary on most of the Mishnah, Beit HaBechirah, providing a digest of the Talmudic discussion and Rishonim there
- An 11th-century CE commentary of the Mishnah, composed by Nathan ben Abraham, President of the academy in Eretz Israel. This relatively unknown commentary was first printed in Israel in 1955.
- A 12th-century Italian commentary of the Mishnah, made by Isaac ben Melchizedek (only Seder Zera'im is known to have survived)

Prominent commentaries by early Acharonim:

- Obadiah ben Abraham of Bertinoro (15th century) wrote one of the most popular Mishnah commentaries. He draws on Maimonides' work but also offers Talmudical material (in effect a summary of the Talmudic discussion) largely following the commentary of Rashi. In addition to its role as a Mishnah commentary, this work is often used by students of Talmud as a review-text and is often referred to as "the Bartenura" or "the Ra'V".
- Yomtov Lipman Heller wrote a commentary called Tosefet Yom Tov. In the introduction, Heller says that his aim is to add a supplement (tosefet) to Bertinoro's commentary in the style of the Tosafot. The glosses are sometimes quite detailed and analytic. In many compact Mishnah printings, a condensed version of his commentary, titled Ikar Tosefot Yom Tov, is featured.

Other commentaries by early Acharonim:

- Melechet Shlomo (Solomon Adeni; early 17th century)
- Kav veNaki (Amsterdam 1697) by R. Elisha en Avraham, a brief commentary on the entire Mishnah drawing from "the Bartenura", reprinted 20 times since its publication
- Hon Ashir by Immanuel Hai Ricchi (Amsterdam 1731)
- The Vilna Gaon (Shenot Eliyahu on parts of the Mishnah, and glosses Eliyaho Rabba, Chidushei HaGra, Meoros HaGra)

19th century:

- A (the) prominent commentary here is Tiferet Yisrael by Israel Lipschitz. It is subdivided into two parts, one more general and the other more analytical, titled Yachin and Boaz respectively (after two large pillars in the Temple in Jerusalem). Although Lipschutz has faced some controversy in certain Hasidic circles, he was greatly respected by such sages as Akiva Eiger, whom he frequently cites, and is widely accepted in the Yeshiva world. The Tiferet Yaakov is an important gloss on the Tiferet Yisrael.
- Others from this time include:
  - Akiva Eiger (glosses, rather than a commentary)
  - Mishnah Rishonah on Zeraim and the Mishnah Acharonah on Tohorot (Rav Efrayim Yitzchok from Premishla)
  - Sidrei Tohorot on Kelim and Oholot (the commentary on the rest of Tohorot and on Eduyot is lost) by Gershon Henoch Leiner, the Radziner Rebbe
  - Gulot Iliyot on Mikvaot, by Rav Dov Ber Lifshitz
  - Ahavat Eitan by Rav Avrohom Abba Krenitz (the great-grandfather of Rav Malkiel Kotler)
  - Chazon Ish on Zeraim and Tohorot

20th century:

- Hayim Nahman Bialik's commentary to seder Zeraim with vocalization (partially available here) in 1930 was one of the first attempts to create a modern commentary on Mishnah. His decision to use the Vilna text (as opposed to a modern scholarly edition), and to write an introduction to every tractate describing its content and the relevant biblical material, influenced Hanoch Albeck, whose project was considered a continuation and expansion of Bialik's.
- Hanoch Albeck's edition (1952–59) (vocalized by Hanoch Yelon), includes Albeck's extensive commentary on each Mishnah, as well as introductions to each tractate (Masekhet) and order (Seder). This commentary tends to focus on the meaning of the mishnayot themselves, with less reliance on the Gemara's interpretation and is, therefore, considered valuable as a tool for the study of Mishnah as an independent work. Especially important are the scholarly notes in the back of the commentary.
- Symcha Petrushka's commentary was written in Yiddish in 1945 (published in Montreal). Its vocalization is supposed to be of high quality.
- The commentary by Pinhas Kehati, which uses the Albeck text of the Mishnah, is written in Modern Israeli Hebrew and based on classical and contemporary works, has become popular in the late 20th century. The commentary is designed to make the Mishnah accessible to a wide readership. Each tractate is introduced with an overview of its contents, including historical and legal background material, and each Mishnah is prefaced by a thematic introduction. The current version of this edition is printed with the Bartenura commentary as well as Kehati's.
- The encyclopedic editions put out by Mishnat Rav Aharon (Beis Medrosho Govoah, Lakewood) on Peah, Sheviit, Challah, and Yadayim.
- Yehuda Leib Ginsburg wrote a commentary on ethical issues, Musar HaMishnah. The commentary appears for the entire text except for Tohorot and Kodashim.
- Shmuel Safrai, Chana Safrai and Ze'ev Safrai have half completed a 45 volume socio-historic commentary "Mishnat Eretz Yisrael".
- Mishnah Sdura, a format specially designed so as to facilitate recital and memorization, published by E. Dordek in 1992. The layout is such that an entire chapter and its structure is readily visible, with each Mishnah, in turn, displayed in its component parts using line breaks (click on above image to view); includes tables summarizing each tractate, and the Kav veNaki commentary.
- ArtScroll's "Elucidated Mishnah", a phrase-by-phrase translation and elucidation based on the Bertinoro - following the format of the Schottenstein Edition Talmud. Its "Yad Avraham" commentary comprises supplementary explanations and notes, drawing on the Gemara and the other Mishnah commentaries and cross referencing the Shulchan Aruch as applicable. The work also includes a general introduction to each tractate. The Modern Hebrew (Ryzman) edition includes all these features.

== See also ==
- Baraita
- Jewish commentaries on the Bible
- List of tractates, chapters, mishnahs and pages in the Talmud
- Mishnah Yomis – daily cycle of Mishna studying
- Mishneh Torah
- Tosefta
- Mishnaic Hebrew

== Sources ==
- Howland, Jacob (2010). Plato and the Talmud. Cambridge University Press.

== Resources ==
=== English translations ===
- Shaye J. D. Cohen, Robert Goldenberg, Hayim Lapin (eds.), The Oxford Annotated Mishnah: A New Translation of the Mishnah With Introductions and Notes, New York, Oxford University Press, 2022.
- Philip Blackman. Mishnayoth. The Judaica Press, Ltd., reprinted 2000 (ISBN 978-0-910818-00-1). Online PDF at HebrewBooks: Zeraim, Moed, Nashim, Nezikin, Kodashim, Tehorot.
- Herbert Danby. The Mishnah. Oxford, 1933 (ISBN 0-19-815402-X).
- Jacob Neusner. The Mishnah: A New Translation. New Haven, reprint 1991 (ISBN 0-300-05022-4).
- Isidore Epstein (ed.). Soncino Talmud. London, 1935–1952. Includes Mishnah-translations for those tractates without Gemara.
- Various editors. The Mishnah, a new translation with commentary Yad Avraham. New York: Mesorah Publications, since the 1990s. (ArtScroll mentioned above)
- Yoseph Milstein, et al. The Mishnah, a new integrated translation and commentary based on Rabbeinu Ovadiah M'Bartenurah, Machon Yisrael Trust, available online at eMishnah.com (archived).
- Various editors. Sefaria full text of the Mishnah with various open-source English translations.

=== Historical study ===
- Shalom Carmy (Ed.) Modern Scholarship in the Study of Torah: Contributions and Limitations Jason Aronson, Inc.
- Shaye J.D. Cohen, "Patriarchs and Scholarchs", Proceedings of the American Academy for Jewish Research 48 (1981), pp. 57–87
- Steven D. Fraade, "The Early Rabbinic Sage", in The Sage in Israel and the Ancient Near East, ed. John G. Gammie and Leo G. Perdue (Winona Lake, Indiana: Eisenbrauns, 1990), pp. 417–23
- Robert Goldenberg The Sabbath-Law of Rabbi Meir (Missoula, Montana: Scholars Press, 1978)
- John W McGinley 'The Written' as the Vocation of Conceiving Jewishly ISBN 0-595-40488-X
- Jacob Neusner Making the Classics in Judaism (Atlanta: Scholars Press, 1989), pp. 1–13 and 19–44
- Jacob Neusner Judaism: The Evidence of the Mishnah (Chicago: University of Chicago Press, 1981), pp. 14–22.
- Gary Porton, The Traditions of Rabbi Ishmael (Leiden: E.J. Brill, 1982), vol. 4, pp. 212–25
- Dov Zlotnick, The Iron Pillar Mishnah (Jerusalem: Bialik Institute, 1988), pp. 8–9
- Reuvein Margolies, Yesod Ha-Mishnah V'Arichatah (Heb.)
- David Tzvi Hoffman, Mishnah Rishonah U'flugta D'tanna'e (Heb)
- Hanokh Yalon, Mavo le-nikud ha-Mishnah [Introduction to the vocalization of the Mishnah] (Jerusalem 1964) (Heb)
- Robert Brody, Mishna and Tosefta Studies (Jerusalem 2014)

=== Recitation ===
- Frank Alvarez-Pereyre, La Transmission Orale de la Mishna. Une methode d'analyse appliquee a la tradition d'Alep: Jerusalem 1990
