= Avraham Goldberg =

Israeli Talmud scholar

- אברהם גולדברג
- Born: 22 January 1913; Pittsburgh, United States
- Died: 13 April 2012 (aged 99); Jerusalem, Israel
- Education: Hebrew University of Jerusalem
- Awards: Rav Kook Prize (1955); Israel Prize (2000)
- Scientific career
- Fields: Talmudic Studies
- Thesis: Critical edition of Massechet Ohalot
- Doctoral advisor: Nahum Epstein Hanoch Albeck

Avraham Goldberg (Hebrew: אברהם גולדברג, January 22, 1913 – April 13, 2012) was an Israeli Talmud scholar.

== Life ==
Goldberg was born in Pittsburgh, and was educated at yeshivot Torah V'Daat and Chafetz Chaim, as well as at the University of Pittsburgh, where he studied English literature. He was ordained at the Jewish Theological Seminary in 1941.

After serving as a chaplain in the United States armed forces during World War II, Goldberg moved to Israel to study at the Hebrew University in Jerusalem, where he remained until his retirement. He volunteered for Mahal and served in the IDF during the War of Independence. In 1952 Goldberg received a PhD in Talmud from Hebrew University, with a critical edition of Massechet Ohalot serving as his dissertation. He completed his doctoral dissertation under the supervision of Nahum Epstein; following Epstein’s death, Hanoch Albeck succeeded him as supervisor.

After graduation, Goldberg served at the Hebrew University as professor and professor emeritus of Talmud, as well as chair of the Talmud department. He also served as visiting professor at the Jewish Theological Seminary and University of Pennsylvania.

Goldberg was married to Rivka Abramowitz and they had four daughters.

== Published works ==
=== Books ===
Goldberg published four books: Critical editions of the Mishnah for Massechtot Oholot, Shabbat, Eruvin, and an analytic study of Tosefta Bava Kamma. A collection of his essays in Hebrew entitled “Literary Form and Composition in Classical Rabbinic Literature” was published by Magnes Press.

=== Articles ===
He also published many articles in scholarly journals.

- Abraham Goldberg. “The Sources and Development of the Sugya in the Babylonian Talmud” Tarbiz, no. 32 (1963): 143–52. JSTOR http://www.jstor.org/stable/23590953
- Abraham Goldberg. “Rabbi Ze’ira and Babylonian Custom in Palestine.” Tarbiz, no. 36 (1967): 319–41. JSTOR http://www.jstor.org/stable/23593011
- Abraham Goldberg. “On the Authenticity of the Chapters ‘Vayehi Baḥaẕi Hallayla’ (Ex. XII, 29) and ‘Shor O Kesev’ (Lev. XXII, 27) in the Pesiqta.” Tarbiz, no. 38 (1968): 184–85. JSTOR http://www.jstor.org/stable/23722012
- Abraham Goldberg. “‘All Base Themselves upon the Teachings of Rabbi 'Aqiva’.’” Tarbiz / no. 38 (1969): 231–54. JSTOR http://www.jstor.org/stable/23593039
- Abraham Goldberg. “The Use of the Tosefta and the Baraitha of the School of Samuel by the Babylonian Amora Rava for the Interpretation of the Mishna.” Tarbiz, no 40. (1971): 144–57. JSTOR http://www.jstor.org/stable/23593595

==== Reviews on his books ====
- Schlüter, Margarete. [Review of The Mishna Treatise Eruvin, by A. Goldberg], Journal for the Study of Judaism in the Persian, Hellenistic, and Roman Period 19, no. 1 (1988): 112–15. JSTOR http://www.jstor.org/stable/24658151
- Segal, Eliezer. [Review of Tosefta Bava Kamma: A Structural and Analytic Commentary with a Mishna-Tosefta Synopsis, by A. Goldberg] ,Journal of the American Oriental Society 123, no. 3 (2003): 662–64. JSTOR https://doi.org/10.2307/3217767
- Goldin, Judah. Review of On the Editing of Mishna Eruvin, by Abraham Goldberg. Journal of the American Oriental Society 108, no. 3 (1988): 471–74. JSTOR https://www.jstor.org/stable/3217767

== Awards ==
- In 1955, Goldberg was awarded the Rav Kook Prize from the city of Tel Aviv for his dissertation.
- In 2000, he was awarded the Israel Prize in Talmudic studies.

== See also ==
- List of Israel Prize recipients
