= Modeh Ani =

Jewish morning prayer

Modeh Ani (Hebrew: מודה אני; "I give thanks") is a short Jewish prayer that observant Jews recite daily upon waking, while still in bed, thanking God for returning the person's soul to them.

== Text ==
Gender of speaker	Hebrew	Transliteration	English
Male	מוֹדֶה אֲנִי לְפָנֶֽיךָ מֶֽלֶךְ חַי וְקַיָּים. שֶׁהֶֽחֱזַֽרְתָּ בִּי נִשְׁמָתִי ,בְּחֶמְלָה. רַבָּה אֱמֽוּנָתֶֽךָ׃	Modeh ani lefanekha melekh cḥai vekayam sheheḥezarta bi nishmati b'ḥemlah, rabah emunatekha.	I give thanks before you, King living and eternal, for You have returned within me my soul with compassion; abundant is Your faithfulness.
Female	מוֹדָה אֲנִי לְפָנֶֽיךָ מֶֽלֶךְ חַי וְקַיָּים. שֶׁהֶֽחֱזַֽרְתָּ בִּי נִשְׁמָתִי ,בְּחֶמְלָה. רַבָּה אֱמֽוּנָתֶֽךָ׃	Modah ani lefanekha melekh cḥai vekayam sheheḥezarta bi nishmati b'ḥemlah, rabah emunatekha.	I give thanks before you, King living and eternal, for You have returned within me my soul with compassion; abundant is Your faithfulness.

== Tradition ==
Lamentations states that "The Lord's mercies are not consumed, surely His compassions do not fail. They are new every morning; great is Your faithfulness." From this, the Shulchan Aruch deduces that every morning, God renews every person as a new creation. This prayer serves the purpose of expressing gratitude to God for restoring one's soul each morning.

The specific prayer Modeh Ani, however, is not mentioned in the Talmud or Shulchan Aruch, and first appears in the work Seder haYom by the 16th century rabbi Moshe ben Machir.

As this prayer does not include any of the names of God, observant Jews may recite it before washing their hands. According to the Kitzur Shulchan Aruch, one should pause slightly between the words "compassion" and "abundant".

In Talmudic times, Jews traditionally recited Elohai Neshamah (Hebrew: אֱלהַי נְשָׁמָה, "My God, the soul") upon waking. The prayer was later moved to the morning synagogue services.

== Interpretations and symbolism ==
Various interpretations have been offered to explain the significance of the prayer. Some categorize the interpretations into the four modes of Biblical interpretation, Pardes, and add a fifth mode, Hasidut.

=== Straightforward, Peshat ===
Modeh Ani is said to thank G-d for returning one's soul just as one thanks God for anything from which pleasure is derived. It is the only blessing that can be said immediately upon awakening, even before cleaning one's hands, since it does not contain God's name. In Talmudic times, they had cleaner bodies, and were able to recite the full blessing with God's name, immediately upon awakening.

=== Allusion, Remez ===
The theme of Modeh Ani, the return of the soul to the body, is an allusion to the idea of the Resurrection of the dead, following the Babylonian Talmud that sleep is 1/60th of death. Thus, thanking God for returning the soul is an indirect affirmation of the future Resurrection.

=== Comparative, Derash ===
The return of the soul to the body can be compared to an object entrusted in safekeeping. God is the guardian of the soul and returns it faithfully. Thus, the moral of Modeh Ani according to this mode of expounding is to be faithful in guarding and returning loans or an object given into one's trust.

=== Esoteric, Sod ===
The reference to God in Modeh Ani, "living and eternal king," indicates that the specific formula through which the soul is returned to the body is through the Sefirot of Malchut and Yesod. This is interpreted to mean that the creation and instilling of the soul in the body is a combination of God's infinite power to create ex nihilo and God's limiting power to not comletely overwhelm independent existence.

=== Hasidut ===
Said to be the essence of Torah like the soul's essence, Hasidut sees in Modeh Ani an affirmation of a person's essential connection to God. At the point where the person is still unclean and unable to pronounce any names of God, the essence of the soul is still able to address God and thank Him.

== See also ==
- Shulchan Aruch
- Shacharit
- Jewish services
- List of Jewish prayers and blessings
