= Hanoch Albeck =

Austrian/Israeli Professor of Talmud (1890–1972)

- חנוך אלבק
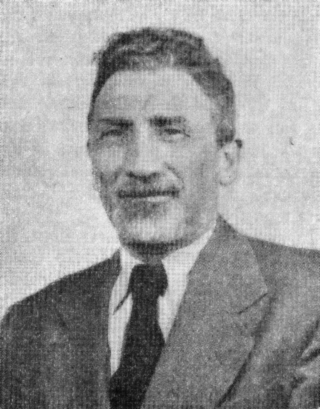
- Born: August 7, 1890; Łowicz, Congress Poland
- Died: January 9, 1972 (aged 81); Jerusalem
- Known for: Mishna scholarship
- Awards: Bialik Prize for Jewish thought (1969)

Academic background
- Education: University of Vienna

Academic work
- Discipline: Talmudic studies
- Institutions: Hebrew University of Jerusalem
- Notable students: Avraham Goldberg, Abraham Joshua Heschel

Hanoch Albeck (Hebrew: חנוך אלבק; August 7, 1890 - January 9, 1972) was a professor of Talmud at the Hebrew University of Jerusalem. He was a foremost scholar of the Mishna and one of the pioneers of the scientific approach to Mishna study.

== Education ==
Hanoch's father Shalom Albeck was the editor of several works by Rishonim including Raavan, Meiri on tractate Yevamot, and Ha-Eshkol (The Cluster) by Abraham ben Isaac of Narbonne. Hanoch studied at the Vienna rabbinical academy, and he received rabbinical ordination in 1915. In 1921, he received a degree from the University of Vienna.

== Career ==
Between 1926 and 1936 Albeck taught in the Hochschule für die Wissenschaft des Judentums ('College for Jewish Studies') in Berlin. Albeck married Hendel Weiss, the sister of Abraham Weiss, and the two had three children. Two of his children are teaching at Bar Ilan University - Michael Albeck, a lecturer in organic chemistry, and Shalom Albeck, professor in Jewish law and husband of legal scholar Plia Albeck. His grandson is Amnon Albeck, a professor of chemistry and rector at Bar-Ilan University. Albeck's son-in-law, Yoseph Aryeh Bachrach, was killed in the 1948 Arab–Israeli War in the battle for Jerusalem, leaving behind a wife and two children. His granddaughter, Rachel Albeck-Gidron, is a professor of Jewish studies at Bar-Ilan University.

== Academic career ==
In 1935, Albeck immigrated to Mandatory Palestine where he was appointed as professor and head of the Talmud department at the Hebrew University in Jerusalem, a position he held for 25 years.

Albeck, a religiously observant Jew, published a number of books in Hebrew and German on rabbinical literature, including "Introduction to the Mishna", "Studies in Baraita and Tosephta", "Introduction to the Talmuds", and others. In addition, he published numerous articles in the journal Tarbiẕ. Albeck also wrote a simple and concise commentary on the Mishna, appending longer footnotes at the ends of each volume. Pinchas Kehati sometimes quotes this work in his own commentary on the Mishna. While the vocalization (niqqud), vocalized by Hanoch Yelon, received special attention in Albeck's edition, the text did not, and therefore Albeck's Mishna is not a fully scientific version of the latter. Albeck's version was written, both stylistically and in its use of the Vilna text, as a continuation and expansion of the uncompleted earlier work of Hayyim Nahman Bialik. Albeck's commentary to the Mishna received wide acclaim, however, Albeck's overall approach to the commentary was criticized by Ephraim Urbach. The authorship of the commentary to Seder Nezikin was the subject of controversy, as Dr. Mordecai Margalioth claimed he was the author of the commentary and Albeck served as the editor. Following a lawsuit, a compromise was reached in which a notice was put in the newer editions of the commentary acknowledging Margulies' contribution.

Albeck's teachers include David Zvi Miller and Avigdor Optowitzer. His students include Avraham Goldberg and Abraham Joshua Heschel, one of the foremost Jewish thinkers in the 20th century.

== Awards and recognition ==
In 1957 it was announced that Albeck was to receive the Israel Prize; however, as a matter of principle Albeck refused to accept the award.

In 1959 Albeck was elected as a member of the Israel Academy of Sciences and Humanities.

In 1969 Albeck was awarded the Bialik Prize for Jewish thought.

== Published works ==
- "Introduction to the Mishna", Bialik Institute, reprinted in 2005.
- "Introduction to the Talmuds", Dvir (1987)
- "Studies in Baraita and Tosephta", Mossad Harav Kook, Jerusalem (1969)
- "The Six Orders of the Mishna", Bialik Institute, last reprinted in 2008
- "Sefer Haeshkol by Abraham ben Isaac of Narbonne", edited by Shalom and Hanoch Albeck, Wagshall, Jerusalem, reprinted in 1984

== See also ==
- List of Bialik Prize recipients
