= Zefat Academic College =

Israeli public college

Coordinates: 32.9711°N 35.495°E

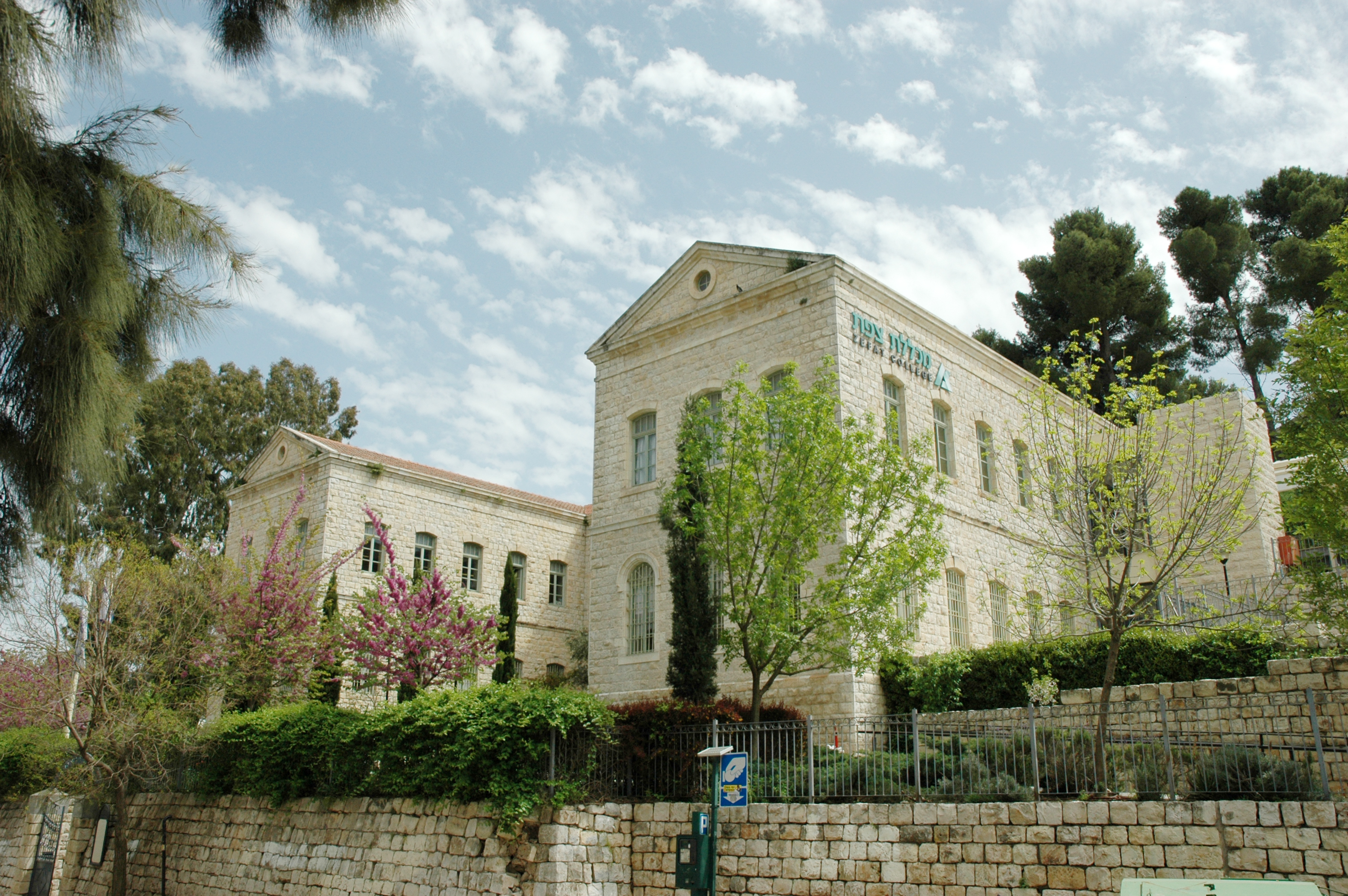
Zefat Academic College

Zefat Academic College (Hebrew: המכללה האקדמית צפת; abbreviated ZAC) is a public college that operates in the city of Zefat (Safed) in the upper Galilee in Israel.

== History ==
The college was established under the academic auspices of Bar-Ilan University. in 1970, established as a separate non-governmental organization in 2000, and was granted independent accreditation by Israel's Council of Higher Education in 2007. As of the 2007/8 school year, the college has begun independent academic study programs for a bachelor's degree in several tracks.

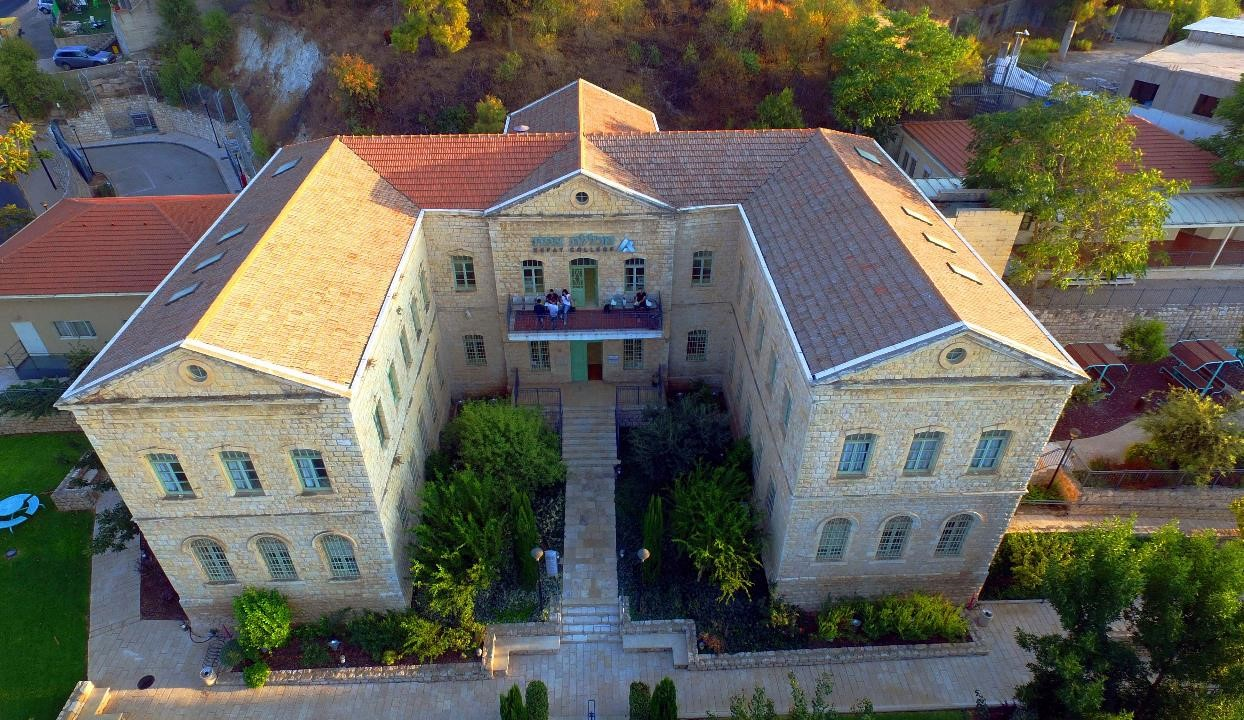
Zefat Academic College - Rothschild-Hadassah Hospital building

Part of the Zefat Academic College campus includes the original building and grounds of the historic Rothschild-Hadassah Hospital. In the early 1900s, Sender Trovitz and the leaders of Zefat persuaded the Rothschild family to help finance the first modern Jewish-owned hospital in the city. Construction began in 1909 and the Rothschild hospital opened in 1912. That same year, the only previous source of inpatient care, the Scottish Hospital which was owned and staffed by Christian missionary physicians, closed its doors. The Rothschild Hospital served the residents of Zefat during the Typhus epidemics, food shortages and local skirmishes of World War I. In 1919, the Hadassah organization assumed responsibility for the hospital's operation. The hospital served the residents of Zefat and surrounding communities through Israel's 1948 War of Independence and until 1973, when the larger, new Ziv Regional Hospital and Medical Center opened in the Southern part of the city.

== The college ==
Zefat Academic College is an independent public institution of higher education in the Galilee region, with 3,000 students enrolled in pre-academic courses and in baccalaureate programs in law, health sciences, social sciences, and the humanities.

In 2018, the college had 705 graduates, who successfully completed their studies. This is the largest number of students completing their studies since Zefat Academic College was granted independent accreditation in 2007.

Academic programs:

- Law: LL.B. bachelor's degree
- Nursing: B.S.N. bachelor's degree and an M.SN master's degree program which opened in 2018
- Physical Therapy: B.P.T. bachelor's degree
- Medical Laboratory Science: B.Sc. bachelor's degree
- Emergency Medical Services: B.EMS bachelor's degree
- Behavioral Sciences: B.A. bachelor's degree
- Social Work: B.A. bachelor's degree
- Academic Retraining for B.A. in social work
- Community Information Systems: B.A. bachelor's degree
- Interdisciplinary Studies: B.A. bachelor's degree
- Literature, Art and Music: B.A. bachelor's degree
- Mysticism and Spirituality: B.A. bachelor's degree

== Multiculturalism ==
Zefat Academic College student body is highly diverse and multi-cultural. This diversity includes students who are Jewish secular, religious and ultra-orthodox, whose families have been in the Zefat region for generations, as well as new immigrants from the former USSR and Ethiopia, together with Muslims, Druze and Christian Arabs and Circassians. This mirrors the demographics of the northern periphery of Israel, with about 60% non-Jewish students.

== Physical development ==
Zefat Academic College's main building is the Rothschild-Hadassah hospital building. Its renovation was funded by the Higher Education

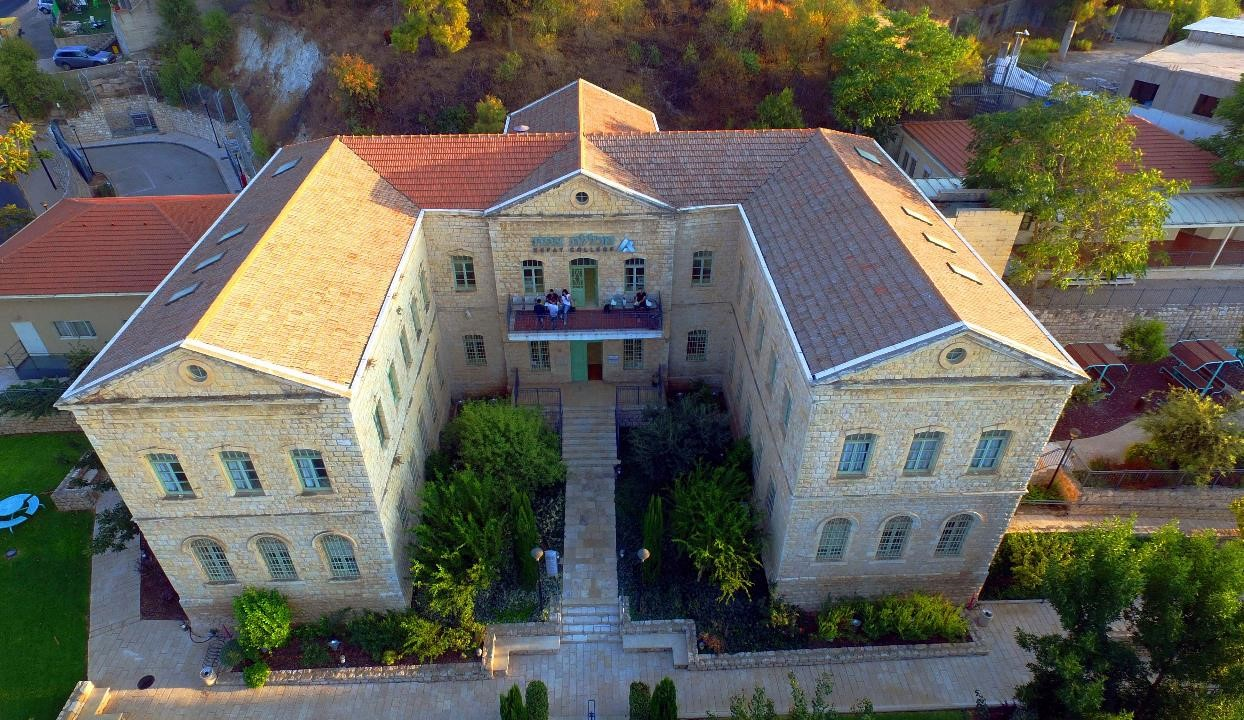
Zefat Academic College - the renovated Rothschild-Hadassah building

Council of Israel's Planning and Budgeting Committee and Zefat Academic College.

Zefat Academic College purchased "Beit Bussel" compound, established in the late 19th century.

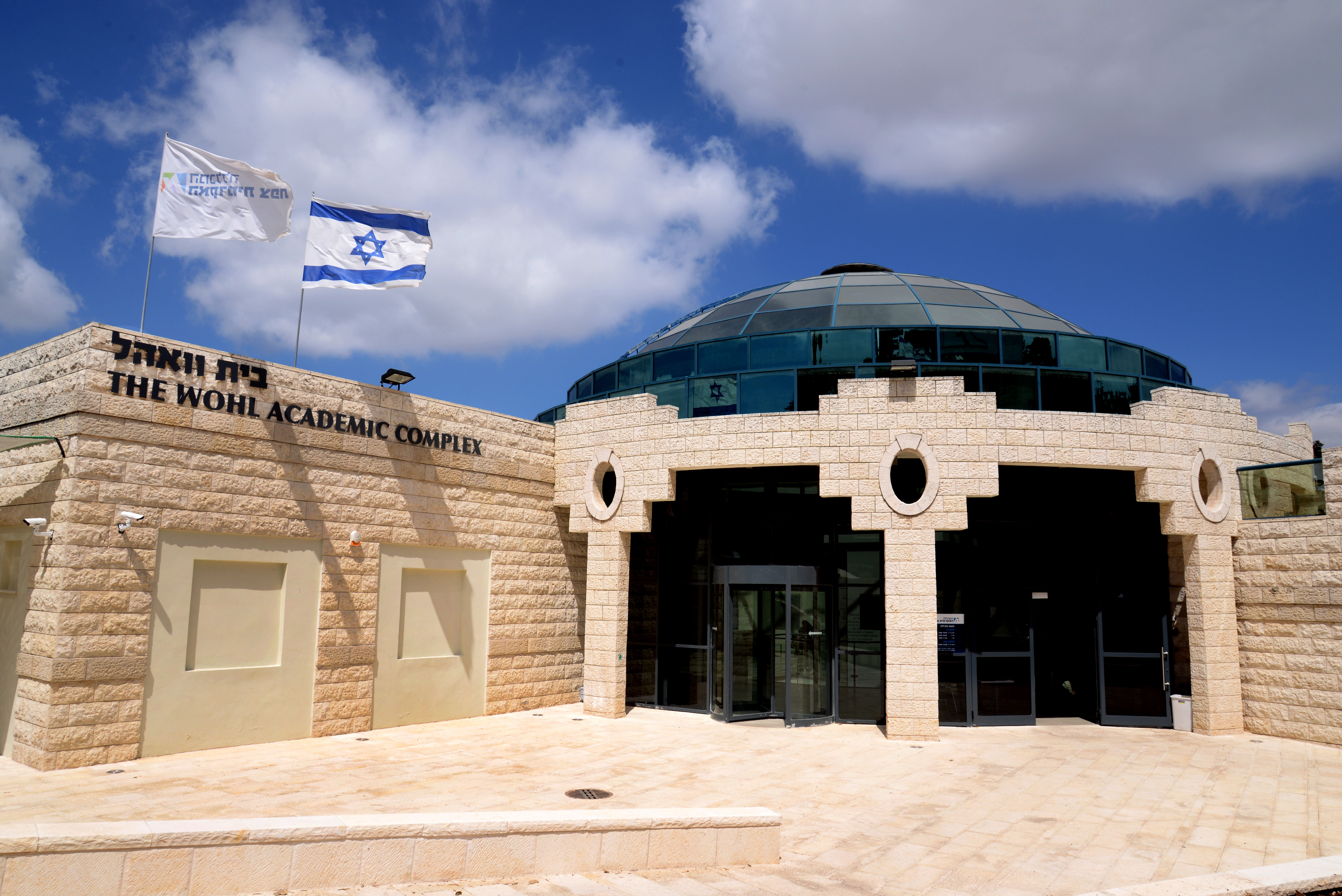
Wohl Academic Complex at Zefat Academic College

In 2014, the college renovated the "Palatin Hall" with the support of the Maurice and Vivienne Wohl Philanthropic Foundation and opened the "Wohl Academic Complex", which includes an academic library, auditorium, support center for students and cafeteria.

In 2017, the college inaugurated the renovated gatehouse structure at the entrance to the compound. Today, the structure houses the offices of the college's school of law.

Currently, the college is renovating the signature structure of the "Beit Bussel" compound: the English Mission Hospital building. In addition, constructions are underway for three new buildings around it, which will house the Medical Simulation & Training Center, the school of nursing, the school of physical therapy and teaching labs. This complex will be the center for medical training and teaching that will house academic staff, students and doctors from the Galilee.

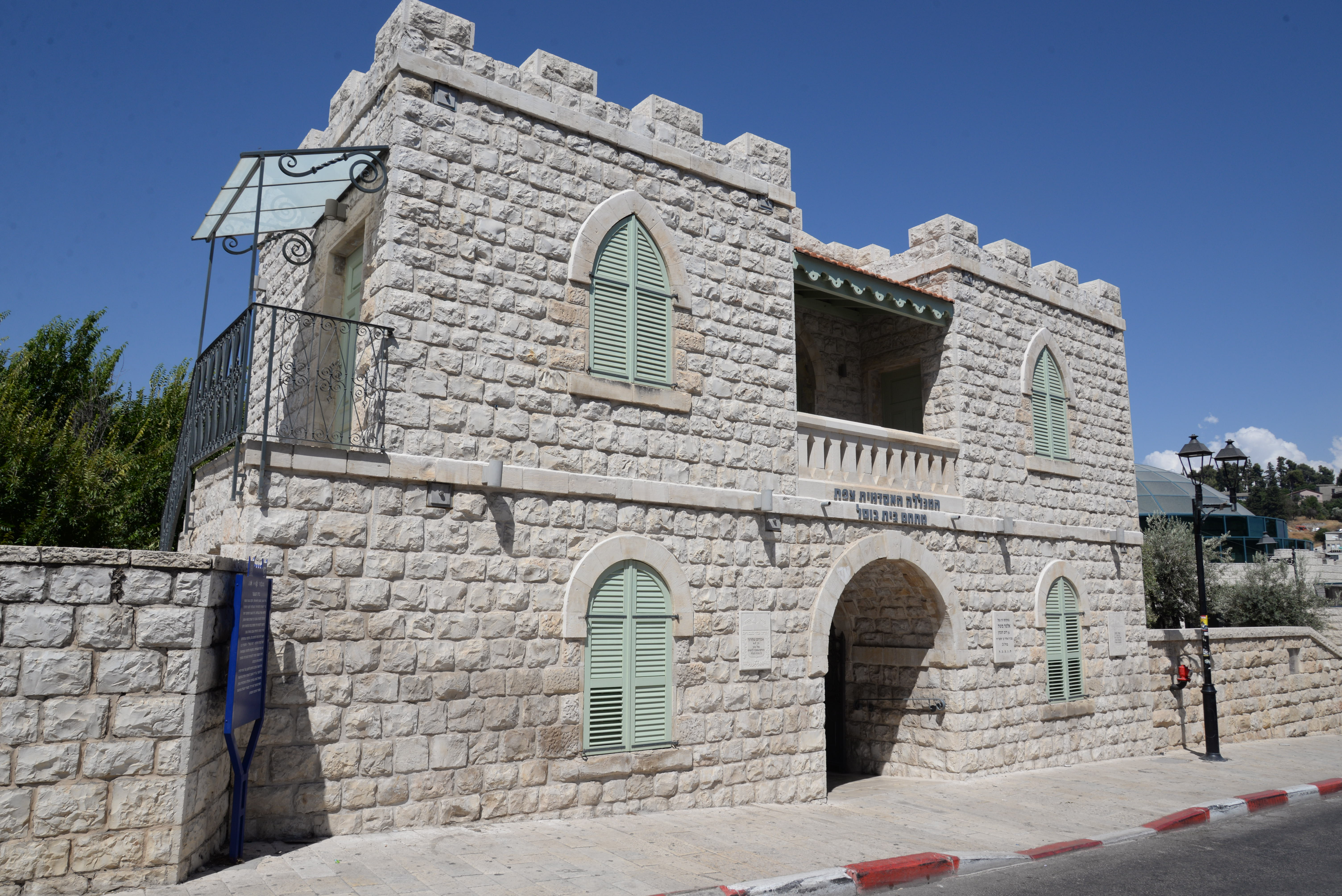
The renovated gatehouse

== Awards ==
In 2018 Zefat Academic College received the Yitzhak Rabin National Award for Quality and Excellence in the Public Sector. (The award ceremony)

In 2012, Zefat Academic College received an honorable mention at the Yitzhak Rabin National Award for Quality and Excellence in the Business Sector
