= Amnon Albeck =

Israeli organic and bioorganic chemist

- אמנון אלבק
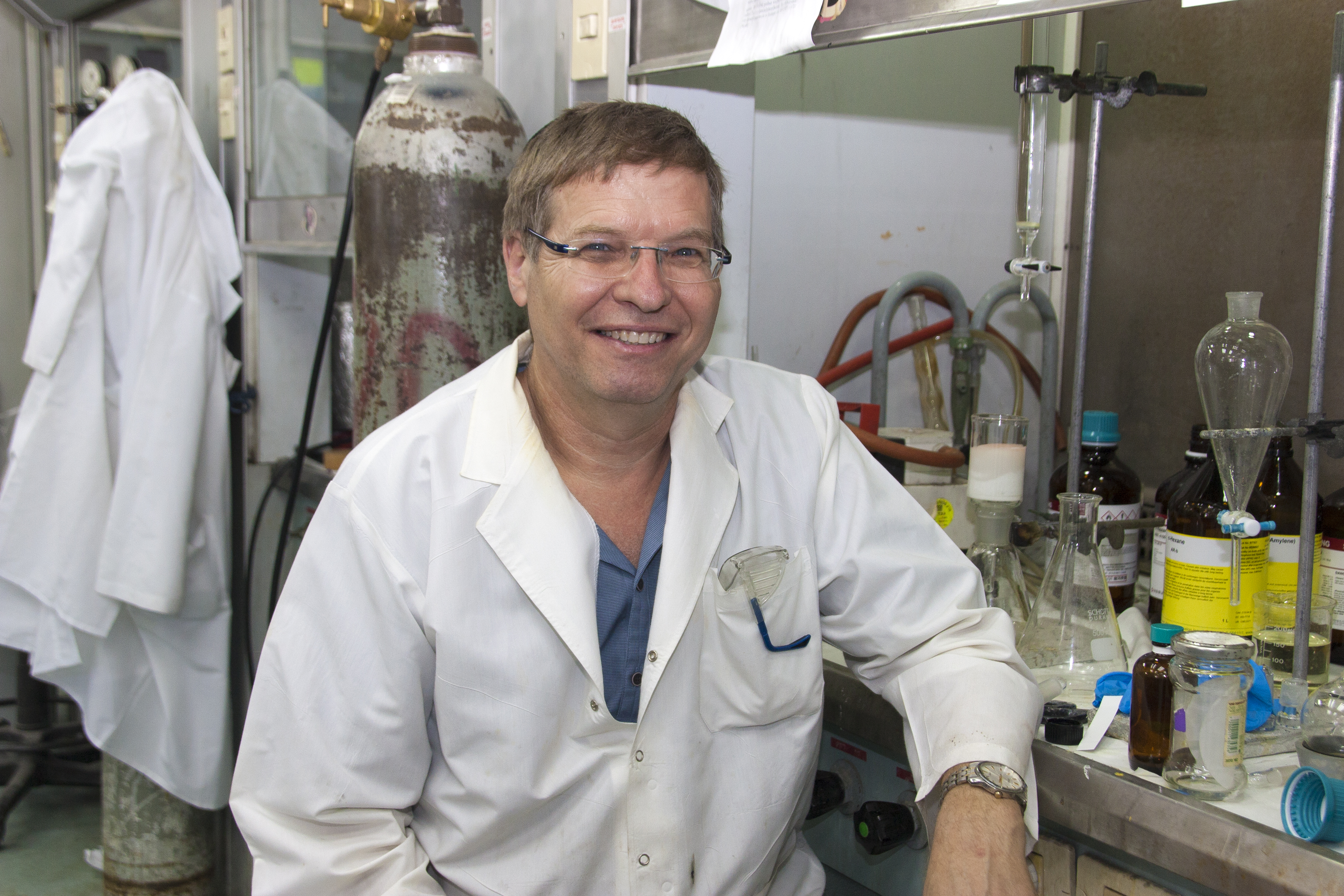
- Born: August 1, 1958 (age 68); Jerusalem
- Citizenship: Israeli
- Education: Bar Ilan University; Weizmann Institute of Science
- Known for: Chemistry of peptides and peptidomimetics, Protease mechanism and inhibition
- Scientific career
- Fields: Chemistry, Biochemistry
- Workplaces: Bar Ilan University
- Doctoral advisor: Mordechai (Mudi) Sheves
- Other academic advisors: Robert H. Abeles

Amnon Albeck (Hebrew: אמנון אלבק; born August 1, 1958) is an organic and bioorganic chemist.

== Biography ==
Amnon Albeck was born in Jerusalem, Israel, to Michael and Shulamit Albeck on August 1, 1958. Amnon's father is the chemist Prof. Michael Albeck, the fifth president of Bar Ilan University (1986-1989) and former president of The Israel Chemical Society (1977-1980). His grandfather, Hanoch Albeck was a professor of Talmud at the Hebrew University of Jerusalem who was one of the founders of the scientific approach to the study of the Mishna.

Albeck graduated from Bar Ilan University (Ramat Gan, Israel) with a BSc in chemistry in 1982, and earned his PhD from The Weizmann Institute of Science (Rehovot, Israel), under the supervision of Mordechai (Mudi) Sheves, in 1988. He then spent two years as a post-doctoral Fellow with Robert H. Abeles at Brandeis University in Massachusetts, USA.

In 1990 he returned to Bar Ilan University as a faculty member at the Department of Chemistry, where Albeck is now a Professor and the head of The Julius Spokojny Bioorganic Chemistry Laboratory. He is also a member of The Marcus Center for Medicinal Chemistry at Bar Ilan University. Albeck served as The Department of Chemistry Chairman in 2008-2011, and he is Bar Ilan University's Vice-Rector since 2014. In July 2020 he was elected Rector of Bar-Ilan University, due to replace Prof. Miriam Faust in office.

Amnon and his wife Shira, who is a staff scientist at the Weizmann Institute of Science, have five children and seven grandchildren.

== Scientific interests and publications ==
Albeck's research interests include: (1) Organic chemistry of peptides and peptidomimetics; (2) Enzyme mechanisms and inhibition, in particular the study of proteases; (3) Drug development and drug delivery; (4) Development of computational tools for the study of enzyme mechanisms and for drug development; (5) Chemistry and biological activity of tellurium compounds.
