= Ein Zeitim =

Agricultural settlement north of Safed

Ein Zeitim עין זיתים Spring of Olives
- Agricultural settlement
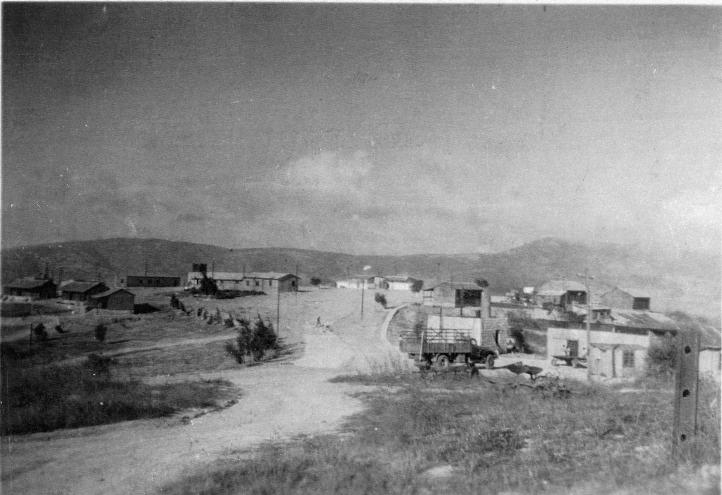

- Location within Northeast Israel
- Coordinates: 32°59′50″N 35°29′9″E
- Country: Ottoman Empire (1891–1917)
- Subsequent countries: Mandatory Palestine (1917–1948); Israel (1948–1951)
- First established: 1891
- Founder: Dorshei Zion society from Minsk

Area
  - Total: 4.3 km^{2} (1.7 sq mi)

Population (1947)
  - Total: 100
- Eventually ceased to be populated and became part of a military base.

Ein Zeitim (Hebrew: עין זיתים, lit. Spring of Olives) was a Jewish agricultural settlement about 2 kilometres (1.2 mi) north of Safed established in 1891 that carried on the name of a historic Jewish community dating back to the Middle Ages. The community ultimately faded out, facing a combination of agricultural challenges, a declining population after World War I and the departure of the remaining inhabitants after three residents were killed in the 1929 Palestine riots. An Israel Defense Forces military base was later established at the site.

== History ==
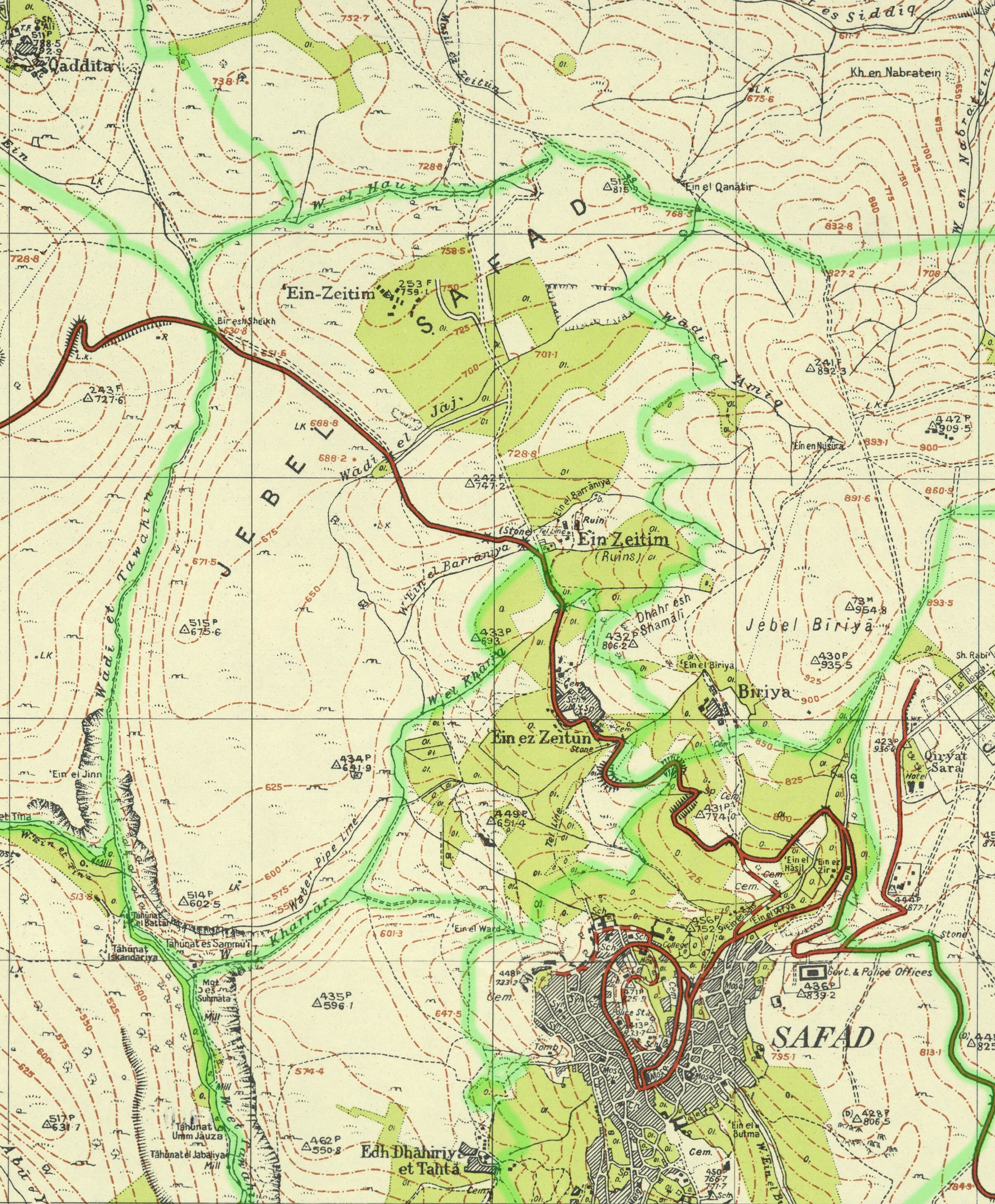
The three locations of Ein Zeitim on a map published in 1952. From bottom to top, medieval ('Ein az-Zeitun), 1891 and 1946. The green highlights show 1940s village boundaries.

The original Ein Zeitim was inhabited by Jews in the 11th century. By the 16th century, 40 Musta'arabi Jewish families lived there, and a yeshiva was founded there by Moshe ben Machir. The town was also visited by Hayyim ben Joseph Vital. Further Jews moved to Ein Zeitim after the damaging 1837 Galilee earthquake.

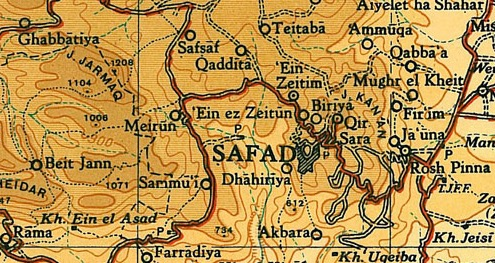
Villages around Safad, 1945

The new Ein Zeitim was founded in 1891 by members of the Dorshei Zion (Seekers of Zion) society, a Zionist pioneer group from Minsk. Sender Trovitz, a merchant and civic leader of nearby Safed, was among those who purchased land and helped develop the Ein Zeitim colony. Despite strong opposition by the government of the Ottoman Empire, the settlers established farms with olive groves, orchards and dairy and poultry.

Ein Zeitim was built 800 metres (2,600 ft) north of the Arab village Ein al-Zeitun, which had commonly been called Ein Zeitim in Hebrew and had been a mixed Arab-Jewish village during the Middle Ages.

A group of laborers bought 430 hectares (1,100 acres) of land about 3 kilometres (1.9 mi) north of Safed from speculators who had first purchased the land in 1891. Unable to work the land properly, the new owners transferred it to Baron de Rothschild, with whose assistance 750,000 vines and many fruit-trees were planted in the course of six or seven years, and during this time a number of houses were built. The population in 1898 was 51.

The village was abandoned during the first World War and only a handful of residents returned at the end of the war. The 1922 census of Palestine recorded a population of 37 inhabitants, consisting of 30 Jews and 7 Muslims. During the 1929 Palestine riots, three residents were killed and the remainder left. Six Muslims and one Jew were recorded there in 1931, living in four houses. An attempt to revive the village in 1933 failed.

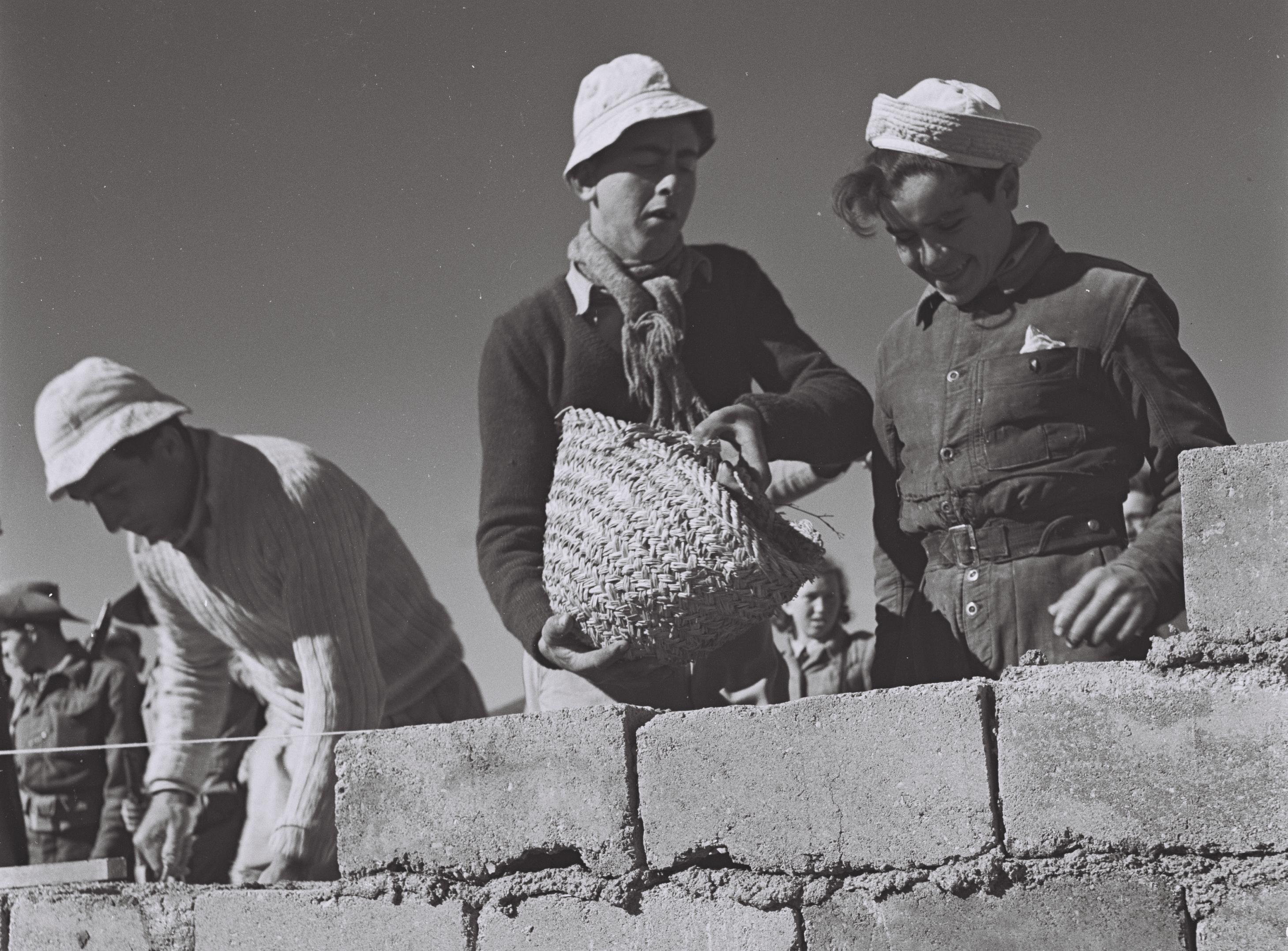
Builders in Kibbutz Ein Zeitim, 1947

In 1946 the village was reestablished after the Jewish National Fund acquired the land. It had a population of 100 in 1947, but by the end of 1951 the population had fallen to 40. Eventually, it ceased to be populated and it became part of a military base.

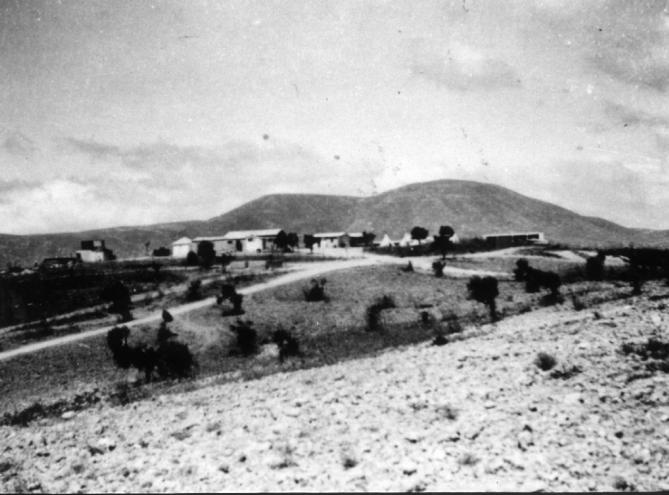
View of Ein Zeitim. 1947
