= Mordecai Margalioth =

20th century Talmudic scholar

- מרדכי מרגליות
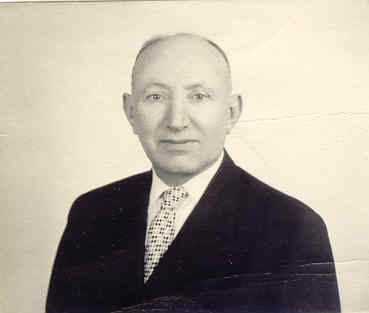
- Born: 13 October 1909; Warsaw
- Died: 24 March 1968 (aged 58); Jerusalem
- Burial place: Har HaMenuchot
- Known for: Talmudic research
- Spouse: Rachel Margolioth
- Awards: Rav Kook prize for Torah literature

Mordecai Margalioth (Margulies) (Hebrew: מרדכי מרגליות; 13 October 1909/28 Tishrei 5670–24 March 1968) was a scholar of the Talmud, Midrash and Geonic literature. He was a professor at the Hebrew University of Jerusalem and at the Jewish Theological Seminary of America.

== Biography ==
Margolioth was born in Warsaw, Poland. His father, Yona, came from a family of rabbis, and his mother Esther Yanish. In 1920, he immigrated to Israel with his parents. He studied at the Tachkemoni High School in Tel Aviv and then at Yeshivot in Jerusalem. He was one of the first graduates of the Hebrew University of Jerusalem.

He edited the “Encyclopedia of Talmudic Sages and Geonim” and the “Encyclopedia of the History of the Gedolim of Israel,” and wrote many of their entries. He also published academic versions of several ancient works with added introductions, notes, and explanations. He published articles and research in various journals.

In 1946, he won the Rabbi Kook Prize for research literature and reference books.

In 1953, he sued Hanoch Albeck and the Devir publishing house, claiming that he was the author of Albeck's Commentary on the Mishnah of the order of Nezikin, and that Albeck only edited it. After several months, a compromise was reached whereby Albeck acknowledged Margolith's help in writing the commentary.

From 1958 until his death, he taught at the Jewish Theological Seminary of America.

He died in Jerusalem from a debilitating illness at the age of 58.

He was married to the biblical scholar Rachel Margolith, and father to five children. His brothers-in-law were Rabbi Yitzhak Kolitz and Chaim Kolitz, and Rabbi Yehuda Kolodetzky.

== Works ==
=== Books he wrote and edited ===
- “Encyclopedia of Talmudic Sages and Geonim,” published by Joshua Chachik, 1947 (two volumes). In 2000, a revised edition of the encyclopedia was released, edited by Dr. Yehuda Eisenberg.
- “Encyclopedia of the History of the Greats of Israel,” published by Joshua Chachik, 1946 (four volumes). Vol. 1; Vol. 2; Vol. 3; Vol. 4.

=== Critical editions he edited ===
- “Halakhot Ketzuvot” - attributed to Rabbi Yehudai ben Nahman (Yehuda Gaon)
- “Midrash Rabba on Leviticus” - one of the earliest Midrashic texts, published by the Rabbinical Seminary in America (two volumes), 1953–1954.
- “Differences Between Bablyonian and Palestinian Jews” - Jerusalem: 1938.
- “Midrash HaGadol” by Rabbi David ben Amram Adani, a Yemenite sage of the 13th century, published by Mossad Harav Kook, Jerusalem: 1947-1957 (Genesis-Exodus).
- “Sefer HaRazim” - a book from the Talmudic period, published by Yedioth Ahronoth, 1967.
- “Halakhot Eretz Israel from the Genizah,” published by Mossad Harav Kook, 1974–1973.
- “Sefer Halakhot HaNagid,” Jerusalem: The Academy for Jewish Studies in the United States, 1962.
