= Michael Albeck =

Israeli chemist (born 1934)

- מיכאל אלבק
- Born: October 1934 (age 91–92); Berlin, Germany
- Education: The Hebrew University of Jerusalem
- Known for: chemistry of tellurium compounds, development of biologically-active tellurium compounds, clinical trials of the tellurium compounds AS101 and SAS; President of Bar-Ilan University
- Scientific career
- Fields: Chemistry, Biochemistry
- Workplaces: Bar Ilan University
- Doctoral advisor: Saul Patai

Michael Albeck (Hebrew: מיכאל אלבק; born October 1934) is an Israeli organic and bioorganic chemist of tellurium compounds. He was President of Bar-Ilan University from 1986 to 1989.

== Early life and education ==
Michael Albeck was born in Berlin, Germany to Hanoch and Henya Albeck in October 1934. His family immigrated to Mandatory Palestine in 1935 and settled in Jerusalem. He earned both MSc in Chemistry (1959) and PhD (1962) from The Hebrew University of Jerusalem.

== Career ==
He worked as Principal Investigator in the Institute for Fiber and Forest Products in Jerusalem in 1962-1964, as the head of the chemical laboratories of Mekorot Water Company in 1964-1965, and then he joined Bar Ilan University as a faculty member at the Department of Chemistry, becoming a Full Professor in 1978. Albeck served as the Dean of The Faculty of Natural Sciences of Bar Ilan University twice (1967-1969 and 1972-1975), as a member of the Board of Governors and the Board of Trustees of the university (1982-1999) and as the university’s Rector (1982-1986) and President (1986-1989; succeeding Emanuel Rackman, and succeeded by Ernest Krausz). Since 2003, he is a Professor Emeritus at Bar Ilan.

Albeck assumed many scientific duties outside Bar Ilan University, including member of the boards of The Weizmann Scientific Press, Dead Sea Works, The German-Israel Binational Foundation (GIF), Teva Pharmaceuticals, and as the President of The Israel Chemical Society. Albeck is the son of the late Prof. Hanoch Albeck, who was a Professor of Talmud at the Hebrew University of Jerusalem and one of the foremost scholars of Judaic studies. Michael and his wife Shulamit, a retired Faculty member of the School of Social Work at Bar Ilan University, have four children, including chemistry professor Amnon Albeck, grandchildren and great grandchildren.

== Scientific interests and publications ==
Albeck’s main scientific interests are in the chemistry and biological activity of organic and inorganic tellurium compounds. Two of these compounds, AS101 and SAS, exhibit immuno-modulating, antiviral and anticancer activity. They are now in various clinical trials. He published over 120 scientific publications and patents.
