= Hanoch Yelon =

Israeli writer

Hanoch Yelon חנוך ילון
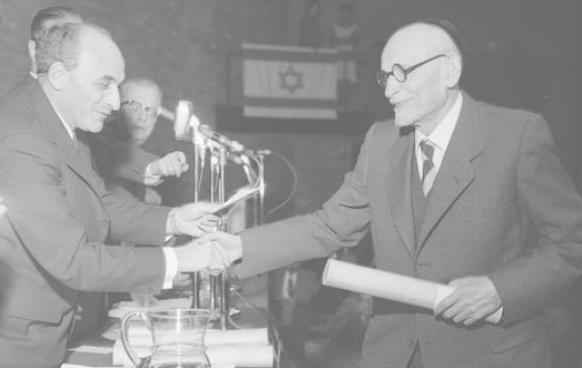
- Born: 1886; Galicia, Austria-Hungary (now Ukraine)
- Died: January 18, 1970 (aged 83 or 84); Israel
- Citizenship: Israeli
- Occupation: historian
- Writing career
- Language: Hebrew
- Notable awards: Israel Prize (1962)

Hanoch Yelon (Hebrew: חנוך ילון; born 1886; died 18 January 1970) was an Israeli linguist and leading Talmudic researcher.

== Biography ==
Yelon was born in 1886 in a small village in Galicia, then part of Austria-Hungary (later part of Poland and now in Ukraine).

Following the end of World War I, he moved to Vienna and in 1921, he emigrated to Mandate Palestine, living in Jerusalem.

Yelon, an expert in Mishnaic Hebrew and grammar, vocalized the text in Hanoch Albeck's edition of the Mishnah.

== Awards ==
- In 1962, Yelon was awarded the Israel Prize for Jewish studies.

== See also ==
- List of Israel Prize recipients
