= David Tidhar =

Israeli writer (1897–1970)

- דוד תדהר
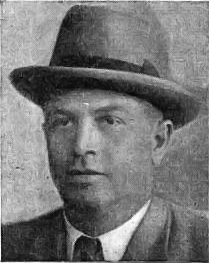
- David Tidhar (before 1950)
- Born: David Todrosovitz; June 7, 1897; Jaffa, Ottoman Empire
- Died: December 15, 1970 (aged 73)
- Resting place: Kiryat Shaul cemetery
- Spouse: Rebecca (Rivka) Tidhar
- Children: Bezalel Tidhar and Esther-Rachel Weitz.
- Writing career
- Genres: Detective fiction Encyclopedia
- Notable works: Encyclopedia of the Founders and Builders of Israel (19 vol.)
- Notable awards: World Association of Detectives Annual Award (1970)

Signature
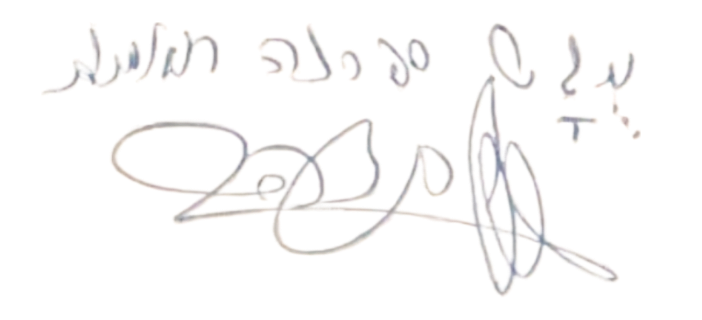

David Tidhar (Hebrew: דוד תדהר; 1897–1970) is most noted as the editor of the 19-volume Encyclopedia of the Founders and Builders of Israel compiled from 1947 until his death. His career included the police - during the British mandate of Palestine, a private detective, a communal leader and an author of detective stories.

== Early life ==
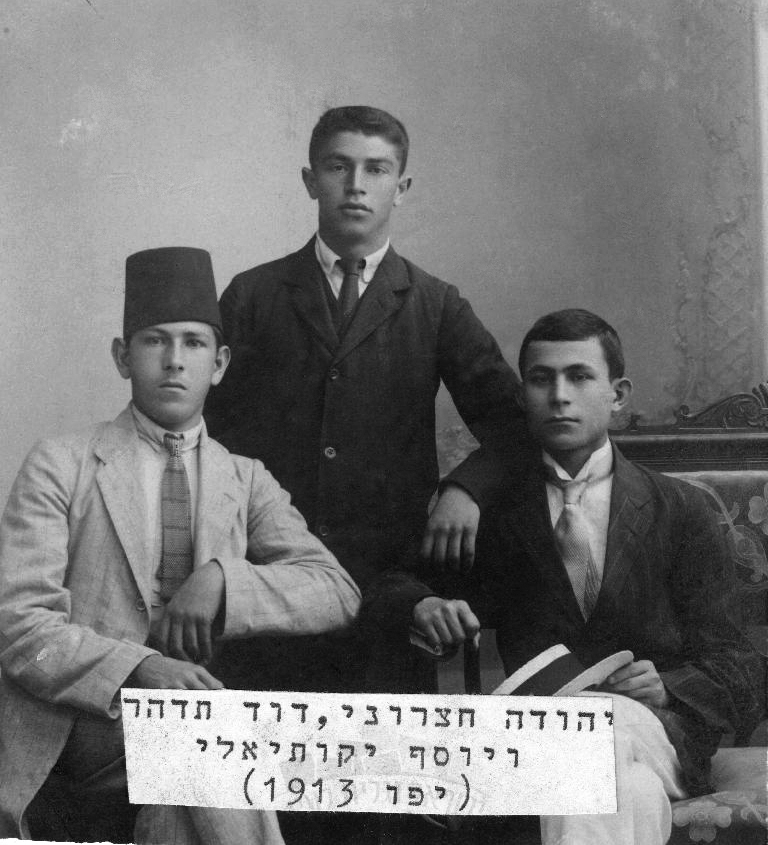
David Tidhar in the center with his friends Yosef Yekutieli and Yehuda Hezroni on the Maccabi Tel Aviv football team, 1913

Tidhar was born in Jaffa in 1897, his parents’ seventh child but the first to survive. He attended a religious school in Jaffa's Neve Shalom district that was founded by his father, Moshe Bezalel Todrosovitz. (Moshe Todrosovich was a philanthropist who had been instrumental in bringing Abraham Isaac Kook to serve as a rabbi in Jaffa - and Rabbi Kook later expressed admiration for his son, saying he had zekhut avot i.e. that he took after his father). Tidhar would later recall his childhood in Jaffa's pre-Tel Aviv era in his memoirs.

Tidhar was involved in community affairs from an early age, including preventing Christian missionary activity during the British mandate period. However his main early passion was football. In 1913 he became the initiator and player of the Maccabi Tel Aviv football team.

Communal activity included founding a charitable organisation (gemach) to provide clothing and shoes to the poor and also to provide advice on avoiding cholera during an epidemic in 1916. In 1918 he volunteered for the Jewish legion, and was involved in the defence of Jaffa's Jews during the 1921 Jaffa riots.

== Early career ==
Tidhar was among the first people to join the Haganah self-defense group and in 1921, he joined and served in the British-run Palestine Police Force, where he initially served in Jaffa but soon moved and became commanding officer in West Jerusalem until 1925. Tidhar was instrumental in helping Jews in awkward situations (for example, the wife of a man who refused to give his wife her divorce papers, and once having to work on Yom Kippur to help some refugees - where he dressed as an Arab so as not to distress his fellow Jews). Rabbi Kook said "There are two men who assist me in maintaining order in religious affairs in Jerusalem. The first is the British High Commissioner, Herbert Samuel. And the second is police officer David Tidhar. However, there is a difference between the two. The commissioner always confers first with his legal advisor, so his assistance is often delayed. Officer Tidhar, on the other hand, is diligent and energetic. He does whatever he promises, quickly overcoming all obstacles."

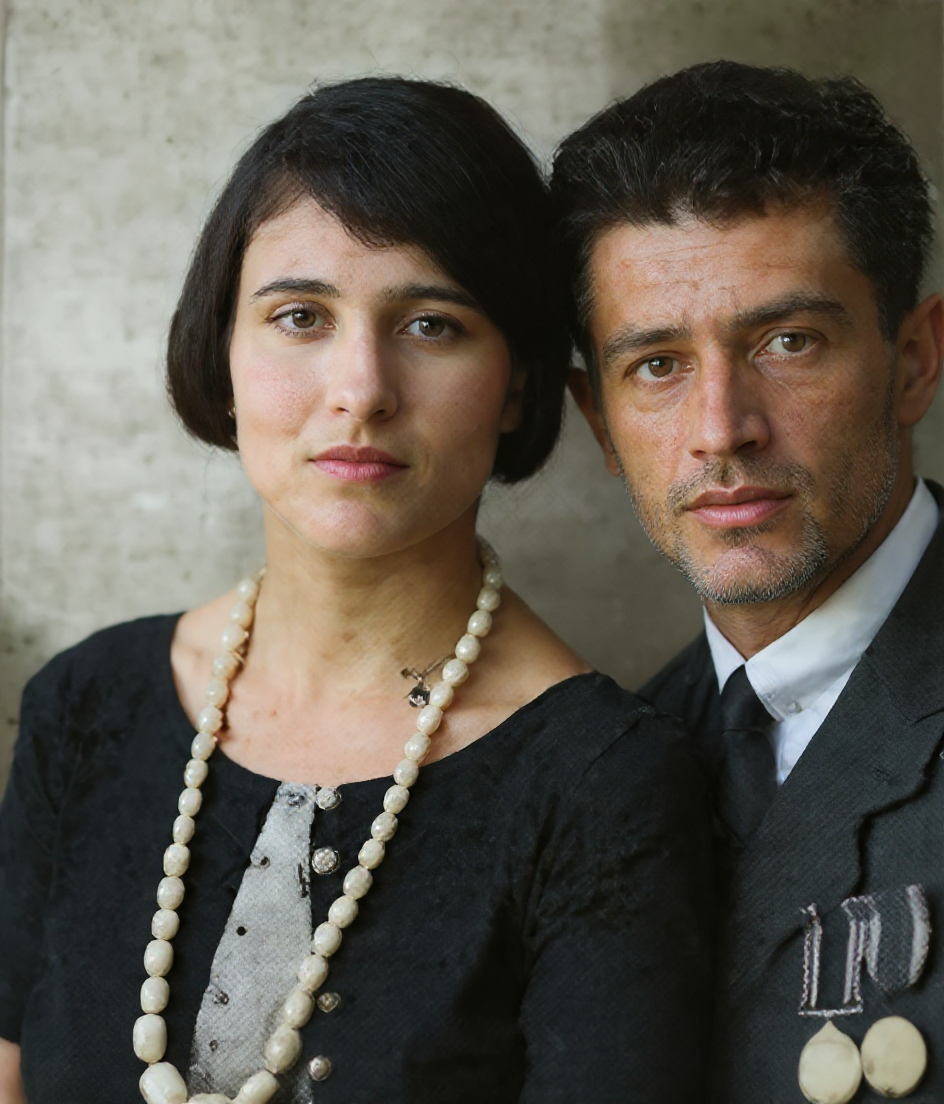
Rebecca and David Tidhar - photo taken between 1924-1926

In response Tidhar acknowledged, "The British officers thought that they were my commanding officers. But my true commanding officer was Rav Kook. For me, any request of the rabbi was an order, which I tried to carry out to the best of my ability. I considered it a great privilege to fulfill the Chief Rabbi's wishes." When, in 1924, Tidhar became engaged to Rebecca Kapiluto of Hebron Rav Kook insisted the wedding be held in his own residence and that he would provide the wedding meal.

In 1924, during a demonstration in Jerusalem, Tidhar accosted the Grand Mufti of Jerusalem, Amin al-Husseini, telling him to stop the provocations that were leading to bloodshed.

In 1926 he opened a private investigation bureau in Tel Aviv. The firm specialized in commercial investigations for local banks and companies. In December 1926, he published an article in a Tel Aviv weekly criticizing the commander-in-chief of the Mandatory police force. Realizing that he was liable to be tried and possibly imprisoned for it, he moved to Cairo with his wife and their infant daughter. He returned to Tel Aviv in 1931 and reopened his bureau. Throughout the years he put his particular knowledge of Arab affairs and of the Mandatory government at the disposal of the yishuv institutions and of the Jewish Agency.

== Later career ==
Tidhar was never involved with any political party - staying friends with all factions. He started publishing books and articles - with a first work, while still a police officer: Criminals and Crimes in Erets-Yisrael - later translated into English and Arabic.

In the 1930s, Shlomo Ben-Yisrael, who founded The Detective Library, wrote a series of weekly chapbooks with Tidhar as the protagonist - seen now as the progenitor of Hebrew detective literature. This character, appeared in 28 short detective novels that created quite a stir in the local community in the 1930s.

David Tidhar with first 10 volumes Encyclopedia of the Founders and Builders of Israel volumes from 1960 (Volume 10 appeared in 1959)

Tidhar's magnum opus is his monumental 19-volume Encyclopedia of the Founders and Builders of Israel that gives biographical detail on many of the people involved in the first aliyah and subsequent Aliyot and is a "Who's W ho" of the Jewish Community in Israel. This work was started in 1947 and continued for 23 years until his death in 1970. On the day of his death, he had gone to the printer with new material. He suffered a heart attack and died aged 73.

Tidhar requested information about, and photographs of the early founders of Israel from relatives and friends, and used this to compile around 6000 biographies (5816 pages) - many of whom do not appear in any other source. To collect materials, Tidhar compiled and sent out thousands of questionnaires, which, at his request, were filled out by the characters of interest to him or their descendants. (His document collection and photographs is now at the Archives Department of the National Library of Israel in Jerusalem as the David Tidhar archive, ARC. 4º 1489.) The encyclopedia itself has now been put online by Touro College with permission of the Tidhar family.

Following the success of this work, Tidhar became a full time writer. Other published work includes Between Hammer and Anvil (1932), a collection of articles; In and Out of Uniform, memoirs of his public activity from 1912 until 1937; The Maccabi Album, Jaffa-Tel-Aviv (1906-1956) and In the Service of My Country, containing memoirs, documents, and photographs from 1912-1960. In 1966, Tidhar published a book dedicated to the Israeli Masonic lodge Barkai, of which he had been a member since 1926.

== Commemoration and Awards ==
In September 1970, three months before his death, the World Association of Detectives awarded the association's annual award to David Tidhar for his activities in the field of detectives. The organization awarded him the prize for being the “father of Hebrew detectives” and the pioneer of Hebrew detective literature.

In 2016, Eli Eshed (editor of Yekum Tarbut) and the Ramat Hasharon Municipality, established the Tidhar Citation Award for Detective Fiction in Israel, with Aryeh Sivan as the first winner.

In 2024, a documentary film "רצח במגדל המים" ("Murder in the water tower") was released in Israel looking at his life through one of the murder cases he investigated.

Streets named after him are currently in Jerusalem, Tel Aviv, Rishon LeZion and Petach Tikva.

== Family ==
Tidhar married Rebecca nee Kapiluto in 1924. The couple had two children, Bezalel Tidhar and Esther-Rachel Weitz.

== External Sources ==
National Library of Israel Collection of David Tidhar's papers
