= Encyclopedia of the Founders and Builders of Israel =

The Encyclopedia of the Founders and Builders of Israel contains 19 volumes and 6,000 biographies of Jewish leaders and settlers in Palestine from the 19th century up to the year 1970. The editor, David Tidhar compiled this encyclopedia over a 23 year period from 1947 until his death in 1970. Touro College, together with the Tidhar family, established a website containing the Encyclopedia and made it freely available to the public.

== Life of the Editor David Tidhar ==
David Tidhar was born in 1897 in Jaffa, Palestine.

== Description of the Encyclopedia ==
This encyclopedia is mainly a "Who's Who" encyclopedia of the yishuv and the first 22 years of the state of Israel.
