= Yated Ne'eman =

Yated Ne'eman refers to

- Yated Ne'eman (Hebrew), an Israeli newspaper published in Hebrew
- Yated Ne'eman (English), an American newspaper published in English

== See also ==
- Yated (moshav)
- Ne'eman (disambiguation)
