= Rackman =

Rackman may refer to:

== People ==
- Emanuel Rackman, American rabbi
- Steve Rackman, Australian actor and professional wrestler

== Other ==
- The Rackman Center, research institution, think tank, and legal aid clinic

== See also ==
- Peter Rachman, Polish-born landlord
- Arthur Rackham, English illustrator
