= Ne'eman =

Ne'eman may refer to:

== People ==
- Ari Ne'eman (born 1987), American autism rights activist
- Ya'akov Ne'eman (born 1939), Israeli lawyer and Minister of Justice
- Yuval Ne'eman (1925–2006), Israeli soldier, physicist, politician, and President of Tel Aviv University

== Places ==
- Migdalei Ne'eman, residential neighborhood of Tel Aviv, Israel

== Newspapers ==
- Yated Ne'eman (Israel), Israeli newspaper
- Yated Ne'eman (United States), weekly Haredi newspaper/magazine based in Monsey, New York

== Law firms ==
- Herzog, Fox & Ne'eman, Israeli law firm
