= Feminism in Israel =

Feminism in Israel is a complex issue in contemporary Israeli society due to the varied demographic makeup of the country and the country's particular balance of religion and state issues. For secular Israeli women, the successive campaigns for women's rights and equality reflect a similar timeline and progression as Western democracies. For Israeli Arabs, however, the issue of feminism is strongly linked to Palestinian causes. And for Orthodox Jews, selected women's rights and women's representation in the Israeli Parliament are recently debated issues.

== Historical development ==
=== First-wave ===
The manifestations of first-wave feminism in Israel began before statehood, during the Yishuv period. These early campaigns were rooted in the ideology of Israeli socialism. A feature of this era is the women who sought to be treated as equals, chiefly in the areas of agricultural labor in the kibbutzim and within the workers' parties. While the first wave of Israeli feminism didn't reach its peak until the 1920s, efforts such as those made in the Revolution of 1886, in which local women worked to gain suffrage in Yishuv institutions are said to have ignited the rise of feminism in the area. It was not until 1927 that women gained the right to vote in Jewish communities and the ability to be elected and serve in the local government.

=== Second-wave feminism ===
Second-wave feminism took somewhat longer to manifest in Israel. Questions concerning the need for a new women's rights movement began in the early 1970s, and in 1972, Israel's first radical women's movement was established. Notable events during that era include the establishment of the Ratz political party ("Movement for Civil Rights and Peace") which won four seats in the 1973 Israeli legislative election.

During this period, key early activists were American Jews living in Israel who organized consciousness-raising meetings in Israel's major cities.

=== In contemporary Israeli society ===
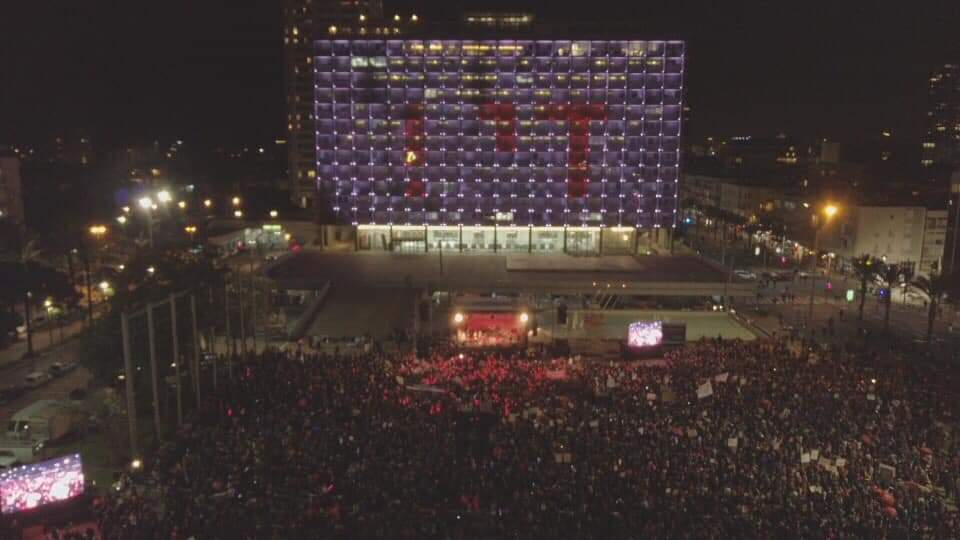
In 2018, 30,000 women protesters gather in Tel Aviv to respond to the issue of domestic violence.

==== Arab Israeli feminism ====
Arab Israeli feminism emerged following Israel's second-wave feminism, criticizing the dominant discourse as ignoring the double discrimination experienced by the Palestinians of Israel, and demanded their path to emancipation. Their initial actions concerned work, education, domestic violence. The general stance of Israeli Arab feminists is anti-colonial and sympathetic to Palestinian nationalism, however, no feminist "movement" has been constituted due to internal organizational fragmentation. In Arab feminist literature, a common theme of discrimination concerns the childhood experiences of boys and girls in the family.

Writings on this trend of feminism tend to neglect the impact on the Israeli Druze community.

==== Mizrachi feminism ====
As feminism in Israeli society developed, a distinction began to form between Ashkenazi (Jews of European origin) and Mizrachi (Jews of Middle Eastern origin) forms of feminism. A rift formed along ethnic lines, as Mizrachi activists felt excluded and marginalized from mainstream women's movements. The First Mizrahi Feminist Annual Conference was held in 1995, representing the formal recognition of Mizrachi feminism in Israel.

==== Orthodox and Haredi feminism ====
In 1981, Chana Safrai, established the first institution for advanced study of Talmud by women, where such illustrious teachers as Dr. Nehama Leibowitz and Rabbi Dr. Binyamin Lau were among the faculty. Following the opening of this school, higher Torah learning institutions for women proliferated in Israel over the next four decades. In 1982 a halakhic study was published highlighting that it was appropriate for religious women to serve in the IDF. In 2002 Aluma was established, which assists religious girls to attain meaningful service in the IDF. In 1987, a legal case was brought before the Supreme Court of Israel arguing that Leah Shakdiel must be allowed to serve on local religious councils. The case was brought after the Israeli Minister of Religious Affairs canceled Shakdiel's appointment to the religious affairs committee in Yeruham. After the court ruled in her favor, Leah Shakdiel became the first woman to serve on a religious council in Israel.

In Haredi Jewish communities, one of the first substantive attempts by religious women to organize along political lines was the establishment of the Lo Nivcharot, Lo Bocharot ("not elected, no vote") in 2012 which campaigned for the Haredi political parties to allow women to join the party. A subsequent initiative was the establishment of the political party U'Bizchutan organized by Haredi women.

A major issue prompting efforts for Orthodox women's rights is the issue of agunot, women whose husbands refuse to divorce under Jewish law.

Haredi feminism is still a slowly emerging trend but it is distinct from modern Orthodox approaches. Modern Orthodox and Religious Zionist efforts include issues relating to religious law such as the question of women's prayer groups and access to public rituals such as dancing with the Torah scroll on Simchat Torah. By contrast, Haredi feminism has been concerned with the political sphere and does not address restrictions in religious ritual areas.

== Legislative responses ==
The Israeli government marks International Women's Day, as marked by the United Nations and other countries around the world, to commemorate the struggle for women's equality under the law. The Knesset has established a Committee on the Status of Women and Gender Equality which is responsible for promoting the status of women in social, economic, and political affairs, and addressing gender-based discrimination in Israeli society.

== See also ==
- Women in Israel
- Jewish feminism
