= Ladányi =

Ladányi or Ladanyi is a Hungarian surname. Notable people with the surname include:

- Andrea Ladányi (born 1969), Hungarian gymnast
- Balázs Ladányi (born 1976), Hungarian ice hockey player
- Branka Ladanyi (1947–2016), American physical chemist
- Ferenc Ladányi (1909–1965), Hungarian actor
- Gedeon Ladányi (1914–1990), Hungarian speed skater
- Greg Ladanyi (1952–2009), American record producer
- László Ladányi (1907–1992), Hungarian writer
- Piroska Jancsó-Ladányi (1934–1954), Hungarian serial killer
- Tibor Ladányi (born 1991), Hungarian footballer

== See also ==
- Ladany
- 181298 Ladányi
