= Yated =

Yated, meaning "peg" in Hebrew, can refer to:

- Two Haredi newspapers:
  - Yated Ne'eman (Israel), an Israeli newspaper published in Hebrew.
  - Yated Ne'eman (United States), an American newspaper published in English.
- Yated, Israel, an Israeli moshav
