= Ladani =

Ladani is a surname. Notable people with the surname include:

- Arvindbhai Ladani (fl. 2022), Indian politician
- Leila Ladani (fl. 2007), Iranian-American engineer

== See also ==
- Ladany
