= Jancsó =

Jancso or Jancsó is a Hungarian surname. Notable people with the surname include:

- András Jancsó (born 1996), Hungarian footballer
- Annie Jones (actress) (born Annika Jancsó; 13 January 1967), Australian actor
- Antal Jancsó (1934–2023), Hungarian tennis player
- Miklós Jancsó (1921–2014), Hungarian film director and screenwriter
- Piroska Jancsó-Ladányi (1934–1954), Hungarian serial killer
