= U'Bizchutan =

Israeli political party (2015-)

U'Bizchutan ובזכותן
- Leader: Ruth Colian
- Founded: 2015
- Split from: Shas
- Ideology: Orthodox Jewish feminism
- Political position: Centre-left
- Knesset: 0 / 120

Election symbol
- נז

U'Bizchutan (Hebrew: ובזכותן, lit., and by their [f.] merit) (also referred to as Bezchutan, 'B’Zhutan, and U'Bezchutan) is an Israeli political party formed in early 2015 by social activist Ruth Colian. It is the first political party in Israel focused on Orthodox Jewish women. The two previously existing Haredi Israeli parties, Shas and United Torah Judaism, do not allow female candidates to run on their election slates. Colian says the party will represent all women who are dissatisfied with the current state of Israel's religious establishment. In the 2015 election, the party failed to pass the electoral threshold necessary to win seats in the Knesset, receiving only 1,802 votes (0.04%).

== History ==
Colian, the founder of the party, had been associated with the Shas party, but the party refused to allow her to run on its ticket in the municipal elections in 2013. When she petitioned to have gender exclusion in political parties declared illegal, the Israeli High Court denied her bid to have funding to political parties cut if they discriminate against women. As of 2015, no female candidates have ever run on the Haredi parties' candidate lists: Tzvia Greenfield, a Haredi Jewish woman, did become the first female Haredi Knesset member in 2008, standing for the left-wing Meretz party.

Although both organizations protest gender discrimination and exclusion in Shas and United Torah Judaism, U'Bizchutan has no official connection with Lo Nivchharot Lo Bocharot, a campaign promoted by Esty Reider-Indorsky and Racheli Ibenboim to encourage refusal of Orthodox women to vote for a party that does not include women on its lists.

Elana Maryles Sztokman, an Israeli author and women's rights activist, notes: "Considering that these women are coming from a world where they have been prohibited from holding public office, the new Haredi feminist movement is radical and revolutionary. It's creating a buzz both within and outside the community." While it is not expected that the party will win any seats in the upcoming election for the Knesset, it expects to make progress in having their demands heard for the Israeli government and rabbis to provide Haredi women the same rights as other Israeli citizens. About 12% of the Israeli electorate is Haredi, and rabbis and husbands expect women to vote the way they are told, even though women are often the only household member who is employed. The new political voice of Haredi women may cause shifts in the future. "In theory, a Haredi woman votes according to what her husband tells her, which is based on what the rabbi tells him", said Colian. "But we know that in the voting booth, that decision is between the woman and God."

Attorney Dov Halbertal condemned U'Bizchutan in radio interview and told founder Ruth Colian, "You will be excommunicated for generations." After threatening comments from religious leaders, Deputy Attorney General Dina Zilber sought to protect the rights of party members and voters. In a letter to the Central Elections Committee, Zilber noted that such statements were formulated to prevent Haredi women from voting freely and running in a Knesset party. Women were thereby being denied their rights as citizens, and denied representation in their government. She added that the statements constitutes threats and exclusion, "a serious phenomenon characterized by discrimination of women only due to their being women".

The founding of the party has created conflict in the Haredi community. Rabbis have threatened the women in the party, and caused party leader Ruth Colian to ask for protection from the government after her 10-year-old daughter was pulled out of class and questioned about party activities.

=== Electoral history ===
The party has only run in one national election. During the 2015 Israeli legislative election the party received only a total of 1,802 votes or 0.04% of the electorate. The party has not run in subsequent Israeli national elections.

== Issues ==
U'Bizchutan's nine candidates, including two men, running in the Israeli legislative election in March 2015, promoted progress on women's issues, particularly education, employment and health issues. U'Bizchutan used social media to reach voters, in part because traditional Haredi publications refuse to accept advertisements from the party. This lack of inclusion of women candidates is consistent with Haredi practices in Israel that include relegating "women to the back of the bus, a separate room at a wedding and even a separate side of the street in some neighborhoods".

The party's advertisements for the March 2015 campaign were initially rejected by some Haredi newspapers, including Yated Ne'eman and Yom Le'yom. Colian then petitioned the court to stop the discriminatory practice. With assistance of the Center for the Advancement of the Status of Women and the Center for Women's Justice, the party prevailed and the court ordered the two newspapers in the complaint to accept the advertisements. The court rejected the claims made by the news organizations that they might offend customers by publishing ads for the Haredi women's party. The head of the Rackman Center for the Advancement of the Status of Women at Bar-Ilan University's Law Faculty, Prof. Ruth Halperin-Kaddari, called the court decision "a historic legal precedent which determines that in certain circumstances, considerations of equality for women and election equality, as well as preventing discrimination against women and their preventing their exclusion, surpass property rights of commercial bodies like newspapers. This is the height of women's exclusion. Haredi women are not only prevented in practice from realizing the basic human right of running and being elected for Knesset, they are also denied the equal opportunity to inform their potential voters that they are running independently." However, Yated Ne'eman then filed an appeal, and Supreme Court Justice Neal Hendel ruled that it would not be required to run these advertisements. Yated Ne'eman, which was started by the founder of the Degel HaTorah political party, one of the parties in United Torah Judaism, claimed that the initial ruling "constituted unlawful coercion and impinged on cultural and religious freedoms".

A last-minute candidate, Gila Yashar, was added to party's list for the March 2015 election. She is a Haredi woman whose situation made Israeli newspaper headlines after a rabbinical court labelled her a "get refuser" and ordered her to be detained, leaving her handcuffed to a hospital bed. MK Aliza Lavie, chair of the Knesset's committee on the Status of Women and Gender Equality, who had helped Yashar with her struggle, commented on Yashar's candidacy with U'Bizchutan to promote the interests of Haredi women: "Those who are supposed to be representing them in the Knesset today do not represent them in many cases. I hope that in the next Knesset, we will get to work side by side, and continue advancing and leading a policy which empowers women from all sectors in Israel."
