= Herzl Award (Hungarian Jewry) =

- Type: Civil honor
- Awarded for: Professional excellence and contribution to Israel and the Jewish people
- Description: Given by the Bnei Herzl Association to outstanding representation of Hungarian Jewry in Israel and abroad
- Country: Israel
- Presented by: Bnei Herzl Association
- First award: 1966; 60 years ago
- Final award: 1982; 44 years ago

The Herzl Award was awarded sporadically by the Bnei Herzl association to representatives of Hungarian Jewry in Israel and in the diaspora, for their excellence in various professional fields for the benefit of Israel and the Jewish people.

== Background ==
Theodore Herzl was a native of Budapest the father of political Zionism.

In 1952, the Bnei Herzl association was formed in Israel, aimed at "continuing the national ideals of Herzl in Israel and promoting Jewish tradition and Culture in accordace with those ideals, particularly among immigrants from Herzl's homeland and the absorption of Hungarian Jews in Israel". In 1966, the Herzl Award was given for the first time.

== Recipients ==
Year	Recipients	Professional field
1970	(Israel) Zvi Bar-Meir	Literary translation
1970	(Israel) Menachem Zvi Kaddari	Jewish studies
1970	(Israel) Ephraim Kishon	Literature
1970	(Israel) Hannah Semer	Journalism
1970	(Israel) Yehzekel Singer	Holocaust literature
1971	(Israel) Dr. Ezra Fleischer	Literature
1971	(Israel) József Gréda	Literary translation
1971	(Israel) Prof. Netanel Katzburg	History
1971	(Israel) László Ladányi	Literature
1971	(Israel) Tommy Lapid	Journalism
1971	(Israel) Hanna Maron	Arts
1973	George Agaryi	Journalism
1973	(Israel) Gidon Arad	Journalism
1973	(Israel) Prof. Pinchas Artzi	Jewish thought
1973	(Israel) Yosef Cohen	Bibliography
1973	(Israel) Yaakov Farkash	Caricature
1973	Andor Gluck	Journalism
1973	(Israel) Moshe Ishbethy	Hebrew linguistics
1973	(Israel) Prof. Ilona Krausz	Arts and music
1973	(Israel) Moshe Sanbar	Economics
1975	(Israel) Yohanan Carmel	Journalism
1975	(Israel) Dr. Arieh Keidar	Journalism
1975	(Israel) Dr. Yehuda Morton	History
1975	(Israel) Prof. Ruben Pauncz	Chemistry
1975	(Israel) Mordechai Rossel	Journalism
1975	(Israel) Al Schwimmer	Contribution to Israel's security and economy
1975	(Israel) Dr. Eliyahu Yeshurun	
1975	Endre Zoltos	Poetry
1978	(Israel) Sarah Frenkel	Journalism
1978	(Canada) Thomas Hecht	
1978	(Israel) Ralph Klein	Sports
1978	(Israel) General Menachem Meron	National security
1978	(United States) János Starker	Music
1978	(Israel) Yossi Stern	Painting
1978	(United States) Prof. Edward Teller	Physics
1978	(Israel) Prof. Yeshayahu Tishbi	
1981	(Israel) Emil Feuerstein	Literature and Journalishm
1981	(Israel) Lea Gottlieb and Armin Gottlieb	Contribution to Israel's export
1981	(France) Michel Gyarmathy	Theatre
1981	(Israel) Fritz Nashitz	Literary translation
1981	(Israel) Dan Reisinger	Painting
1981	(Israel) Zvi Yair	Poetry
1982	(Israel) Hillel Danzig	Journalism
1982	(Israel) Ágnes Keleti	Sports
1982	(Israel) Amos Manor	National security
1982	(United States) Prof. Eugene Wigner	Physics
