= Shas =

Israeli political party

Shas ש״ס
- Leader: Aryeh Deri
- Spiritual Leader: Yitzhak Yosef
- Founders: Elazar Shach; Ovadia Yosef
- Founded: 1984
- Split from: Agudat Yisrael
- Headquarters: Jerusalem
- Newspaper: HaDerech
- Ideology: Social conservatism; Religious conservatism; Social democracy; Sephardic and Mizrahi interests; Haredi interests; Religious Zionism (since 2010); Formerly; Haredi non-Zionism (until 2010)
- Political position: Fiscal: Centre-left; Social: Right-wing
- Religion: Haredi Judaism (Sephardic)
- International affiliation: World Zionist Organization
- Colours: Black, Gold; Azure (historically)
- Ballot letters: Hebrew: שס; Arabic: ش‌س
- Knesset: 6 / 120

Website
- shas.org.il

Shas (Hebrew: ש״ס) is a Haredi religious political party in Israel. Founded in 1984 by Rabbi Ovadia Yosef, a former Israeli Sephardi chief rabbi, who remained its spiritual leader until his death in October 2013, it primarily represents the interests of Sephardic and Mizrahi Haredi Jews.

Shas is the third-largest party in the Knesset as of 2024. Since 1984, it has been part of most governing coalitions, whether the ruling party was Labor or Likud.

== Name ==
The party was originally called Shom'rei Torah ("Guardians of the Torah"), with the acronym ש״ת, pronounced "Shat" or "Shas". However, Israeli election law requires a party wishing to use letters for their acronym that already appear in the acronym of an existing party to first obtain permission from that party, and the Israeli Labor Party, whose letters are אמת, refused to grant Shas permission to use the ת. Instead, it was named ש״ס, Shas, an acronym for Shomrei S'farad, meaning "Sephardic Guardians". The name is also a reference to the six orders (Shisha S'darim) of the Mishnah and the Talmud, both of which are often referred to by the same acronym, "Shas". The party's legal name is "Hit'akhdut ha-S'pharadim ha-Olamit Shom'rei Torah" (התאחדות הספרדים העולמית שומרי תורה), meaning "International Union of the Sepharadim, Guardians of the Torah".

== History ==
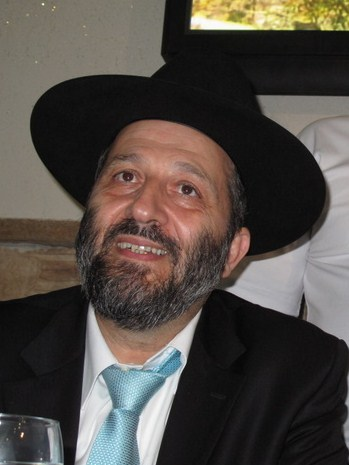
Aryeh Deri, chairman of Shas

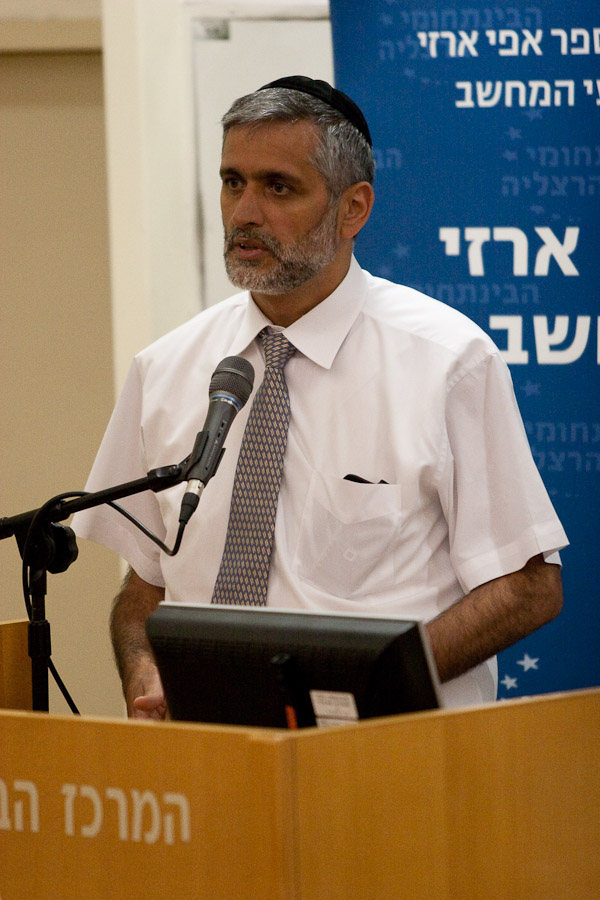
Eli Yishai in 2009

Shas was founded in 1984, prior to the elections to the eleventh Knesset in the same year, in protest against the small representation of Sephardim in the largely Ashkenazi Agudat Yisrael, through the merger of regional lists which were compiled in 1983. It was originally known as the Worldwide Sephardic Association of Torah Keepers (Hebrew: הִתְאַחֲדוּת הַסְּפָרַדִּים הָעוֹלָמִית שׁוֹמְרֵי תּוֹרָה, Hitahdut HaSfaradim HaOlamit Shomrei Torah). The party was formed under the leadership of former Israeli Chief Sephardi Rabbi Ovadia Yosef, who established a four-member (including himself) Council of Torah Sages and remained the party's spiritual leader until his death. In founding the party, Yosef received strategic help and guidance from Rabbi Elazar Shach, leader of Israel's non-Hasidic Haredi Ashkenazi Jews. Yosef founded the party in 1984 on the platform of a return to religion and as a counter to an establishment dominated by Ashkenazi Jews of European extraction.

In the 1984 Knesset elections Shas won four seats. Following Aryeh Deri's conviction on corruption charges in 1999 Shas won 17 seats in the 1999 elections, its strongest showing since its formation. Although 26 seats were projected for the following election had it run in 2001, Shas was reduced to eleven seats in the 2003 election because the two-ballot system was amended.

In the 2006 elections it gained one more seat, after running what the BBC called "an aggressive campaign that targeted the neo-conservative economic policies of the previous government", and joined Ehud Olmert's coalition government, alongside Kadima, Labor, Gil and, between October 2006 and January 2008, Yisrael Beiteinu. In the government, Shas party leader Yishai was Minister of Industry, Trade and Labor and Deputy Prime Minister, while Ariel Atias was Minister of Communications and Meshulam Nahari and Yitzhak Cohen were Ministers without Portfolio.

Following the 2009 elections, in which Shas won eleven seats, it joined Benjamin Netanyahu's coalition government and held four cabinet posts. Eli Yishai, who led the party at that time, was one of four Deputy Prime Ministers and Minister of Internal Affairs. On 4 December 2011 Shas launched its United States affiliate, American Friends of Shas, based in Brooklyn, New York.

Shas won eleven seats in the 2013 elections, but chose to form part of the Labor opposition to Netanyahu's new government. Yair Lapid of the Yesh Atid party and Naftali Bennett of The Jewish Home, who had won more seats and joined the coalition, both favored conscription of the previously exempt Haredi men into Israel's national service and a reduction in state financial support for Haredi families, policies Shas opposes.

In December 2014 Eli Yishai left the Shas party, which he had led for more than a decade. He said he would lead a new religious party in the election scheduled for March 2015. His departure from Shas and Aryeh Deri did not come as a surprise. The party that he formed, Yachad, failed to pass the election threshold. In the ensuing election, Shas was accused of tampering with Yachad ballots. They were also accused of creating a straw party with the symbols of Otzma Yehudit, which was running on a joint list with Yachad during the election. Shas won seven seats in the election.

In 2017 opinion polling showed Shas falling under the election threshold of 3.25%. In response, Shas leaders said that there was a coup attempt in the party. In the same year, a tape was leaked of the party's former spiritual leader, criticizing Jerusalem Chief Rabbi Shlomo Amar.

The party won eight seats in the April 2019 election and nine seats in September 2019. Both elections were inconclusive and resulted in a third election in 2020, in which Shas won nine seats. After the election, a senior Likud minister anonymously told Al-Monitor that Deri was mediating political coalition talks between Netanyahu and Blue and White leader Benny Gantz. It was also reported that Deri "might even be open to a new alliance with Blue and White" after the anti-clerical Yesh Atid split from the alliance. Negotiations subsequently resulted in the formation of a rotation government between Netanyahu and Gantz, which included Shas. The government collapsed in December 2020 due to failed budget negotiations, resulting in another snap election in 2021.

Shas won nine seats in the 2021 elections, but remained out of government for the first time since 2013. Later that year, Deri resigned from the Knesset as part of a plea bargain for alleged tax evasion. The new government collapsed after a year, and elections were held in 2022, Shas won 11 seats. Shas returned to government, with Deri becoming Interior Minister, Health Minister and Vice Prime Minister. In early 2023, Deri was required to relinquish his ministerial posts due to the plea bargain after a ruling by the Supreme Court. He remained a member of the Knesset and the leader of Shas. Shas' ministers resigned from government in July 2025 over the government's failure to pass a law excluding ultra-Orthodox youth from the draft, but remain part of the coalition. The party won six seats in the 2026 elections. Deri announced on 8 November that he would not take his seat in the Knesset following the party's poor election result. Moshe Abutbul and Dror Amos also withdrew from the list, allowing Uriel Buso and Yosef Taieb to become MKs. Deri called for a "thorough" analysis into the party's weakening.

== Voter base ==
Not all Shas voters are ultra-Orthodox Jews. Many of its voters are Modern Orthodox and traditional Mizrahi and Sephardi Jews, due to its alignment with the promotion of an "authentic Middle Eastern" Israeli culture, which fits with traditional Zionist beliefs of a revival of authentic, non-Europeanized Jewish culture. However, it still represents the Sephardi and Mizrahi Haredi Jewish sectors in the Knesset. Shas has at times been able to exert disproportionate influence by gaining control of the balance of power in the Knesset within the context of the traditionally narrow margin between Israel's large parties. Like its Labor Zionist counterparts (i. e., Labor and Meretz) that gain votes from the kibbutz movement, Shas gains votes and supports from moshavim that are inhabited by Mizrahi and Sephardi Jews, either Orthodox or non-Orthodox. Also, since it became a member of the World Zionist Organization, it gains votes from Orthodox settlers in the West Bank.

== Ideology ==
The stated purpose of the party is to "return the crown to the former glory", meaning to protect the religious and cultural heritage of Sephardic Jewry and rectify what it sees as the "continued economic and social discrimination against the Sephardic population of Israel". Focusing on the needs of Sephardic Orthodox Israelis, Shas established its own government-funded religious education system called MaAyan HaHinuch HaTorani, which became popular in poor Sephardic towns, increasing the party's popular support.

Shas advocates for the increased influence of Halakha, the Jewish religious law, in Israeli society, and actively engages in the Baal teshuva movement, encouraging non-Orthodox Israelis of Sephardic and Mizrahi-Jewish heritage to adopt an Orthodox Jewish lifestyle. Shas is a Haredi religious party, but it has participated in left-wing governments and is often willing to compromise on both religious and economic issues.

At first Shas followed a moderate policy on the Israeli–Palestinian conflict, after Yosef had declared that lives were more important than territories, but by the 2010s it had moved to the right, opposing any freeze in Israeli settlement activity in the West Bank. In addition, it was skeptical towards the U.S. Obama Administration's intentions regarding the Israeli–Palestinian peace process and began to support a consolidation of Israeli settlement interests, especially regarding yeshivas and Jewish holy sites in the West Bank. It further believes in a "United Jerusalem" and supports the Greater Jerusalem plan. In 2010, Shas joined the World Zionist Organization, having made significant changes to its charter.

One of Shas's demands is a compensation package for Sephardi and Mizrahi Jews who were forced to flee their home countries and leave their property behind.

Shas opposes any form of public expression of homosexuality, including Gay Pride parades, especially in Jerusalem. Shas MK Nissim Ze'ev accused the homosexual community of "carrying out the self-destruction of Israeli society and the Jewish people", calling homosexuality "a plague as toxic as bird flu". However, the party condemns any form of violence against gay people.

== Controversies ==
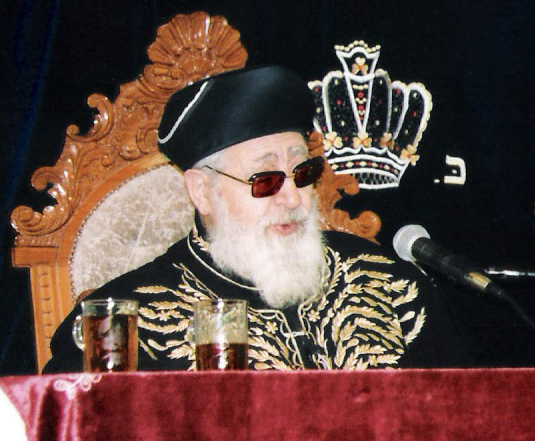
Ovadiah Yosef, long-time spiritual leader of Shas

Several Shas MKs, including Aryeh Deri, Rafael Pinhasi, Yair Levy, Ofer Hugi and Yair Peretz, have been convicted of criminal offenses that include fraud and forgery. In addition, MK Shlomo Benizri was convicted of bribery, conspiring to commit a crime and obstruction of justice on 1 April 2008.

In 2010 Ovadia Yosef cursed the Palestinians as "evil, bitter enemies of Israel" and said that, "Abu Mazen and all these evil people should perish from this world. God should strike them with a plague." Saeb Erekat of the PLO said Yosef's remarks were tantamount to a call for "genocide against Palestinians". Yosef later apologized and wrote to Egyptian President Hosni Mubarak: "I support your efforts and praise all the leaders and the peoples — Egyptians, Jordanians and Palestinians — who are partners and wish the success of this important process of achieving peace in our region, and preventing bloodshed. May God grant you longevity and may you succeed in your efforts for peace and may there be peace in our region." Previously, Yosef had called Arabs "vipers" and called for Israel to "annihilate" them. "It is forbidden to be merciful to them. You must send missiles to them and annihilate them. They are evil and damnable." A spokesman later clarified that his comments were only aimed at murderers and terrorists and not the entire Arab world.

In 2020 the party was fined ₪7,500 by the Central Elections Committee for handing out prayer cards at polling stations during the 2020 Knesset elections, which were claimed to cure "Corona and every illness and pestilence".

== Women's campaign ==
Women activists protested the lack of female representation in Shas by organizing a "No Female Candidate, No Female Vote" campaign. The women said they would not vote for a party that does not include women candidates on its slate and sent an open letter to the Knesset representatives of ultra-Orthodox parties, which was also circulated on social media. Rabbi Mordechai Blau, a senior party member, threatened that women participating in the movement or bucking the party leadership would find their children "banned from Haredi schools" and their employers "boycotted by the community". Shas announced that it would create a women's council within the movement, a step that was welcomed by the campaigners. At the same time, they said: "We will move forward and call on the Haredi factions to enable women to serve as MKs in the Knesset." Eli Yishai said on Israel Radio: "There is nothing in Jewish law that says you can't have a woman as a Knesset member. But our rabbis decide what they decide on every subject and the same goes for this."

When a group of ultra-Orthodox women created their own party, U'Bizchutan, Isaac Bezalel, the Shas spokesman, said: "The Haredi public is not yet open to women serving in the Knesset."

== Current Knesset members ==
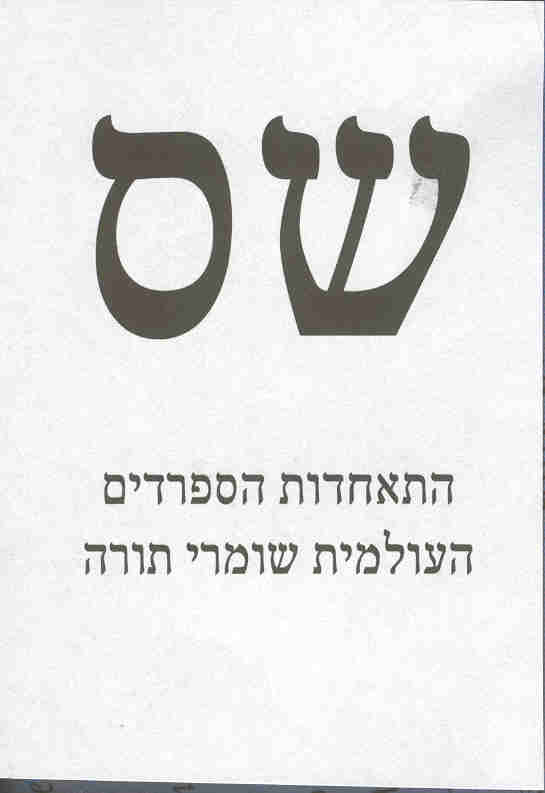
Shas party ballot 2009

Six men serve as members of the Knesset for Shas in the twenty-sixth Knesset:

1. Yinon Azulai
2. Michael Malchieli
3. Yoav Ben-Tzur
4. Haim Biton
5. Uriel Buso
6. Yosef Taieb

== Party leaders ==
Leader		Took office	Left office	Spiritual Leader	Took office	Left office
1	Nissim Ze'ev	1982	1984	Ovadia Yosef	1982	2013
2	Yitzhak Peretz	1984	1990	Ovadia Yosef	1982	2013
3	Aryeh Deri	1990	1999	Ovadia Yosef	1982	2013
4	Eli Yishai	1999	2012	Ovadia Yosef	1982	2013
5	Triumvirate (Note: Aryeh Deri, Eli Yishai and Ariel Atias)	2012	2013	Ovadia Yosef	1982	2013
(3)	Aryeh Deri	2013	Incumbent	Shalom Cohen	2013	2022

== Election results ==
=== Knesset ===
Election	Leader	Votes	%	Seats	+/–	Status
1984	Yitzhak Haim Peretz	63,605	3.07	4 / 120	New	Coalition
1988	Yitzhak Haim Peretz	107,709	4.72	6 / 120	▲2	Coalition
1992	Aryeh Deri	129,347	4.94	6 / 120	0	Coalition (1992–1993)
1992	Aryeh Deri	129,347	4.94	6 / 120	0	Opposition (1993–1996)
1996	Aryeh Deri	259,796	8.51	10 / 120	▲4	Coalition
1999	Aryeh Deri	430,676	13.01	17 / 120	▲7	Coalition
2003	Eli Yishai	258,879	8.22	11 / 120	▼6	Opposition
2006	Eli Yishai	299,054	9.53	12 / 120	▲1	Coalition
2009	Eli Yishai	286,300	8.49	11 / 120	▼1	Coalition
2013	Eli Yishai	331,868	8.75	11 / 120	0	Opposition
2015	Aryeh Deri	241,613	5.73	7 / 120	▼4	Coalition
Apr 2019	Aryeh Deri	258,275	5.99	8 / 120	▲1	Snap election
Sep 2019	Aryeh Deri	329,834	7.44	9 / 120	▲1	Snap election
2020	Aryeh Deri	352,842	7.69	9 / 120	0	Coalition
2021	Aryeh Deri	316,008	7.17	9 / 120	0	Opposition
2022	Aryeh Deri	392,644	8.24	11 / 120	▲2	Coalition
2026	Aryeh Deri	299,533	5.26	6 / 120	▼5	TBA
