= Ladany =

Ladany is a surname. Notable people with the surname include:

- László Ladány (1914–1990), Hungarian sinologist
- Nicolas Ladany (1889–?), Hungarian football coach
- Shaul Ladany (born 1936), Israeli racewalker

== See also ==
- Ladányi
- Ladani
