= Ze'ev (caricaturist) =

Israeli caricaturist and illustrator

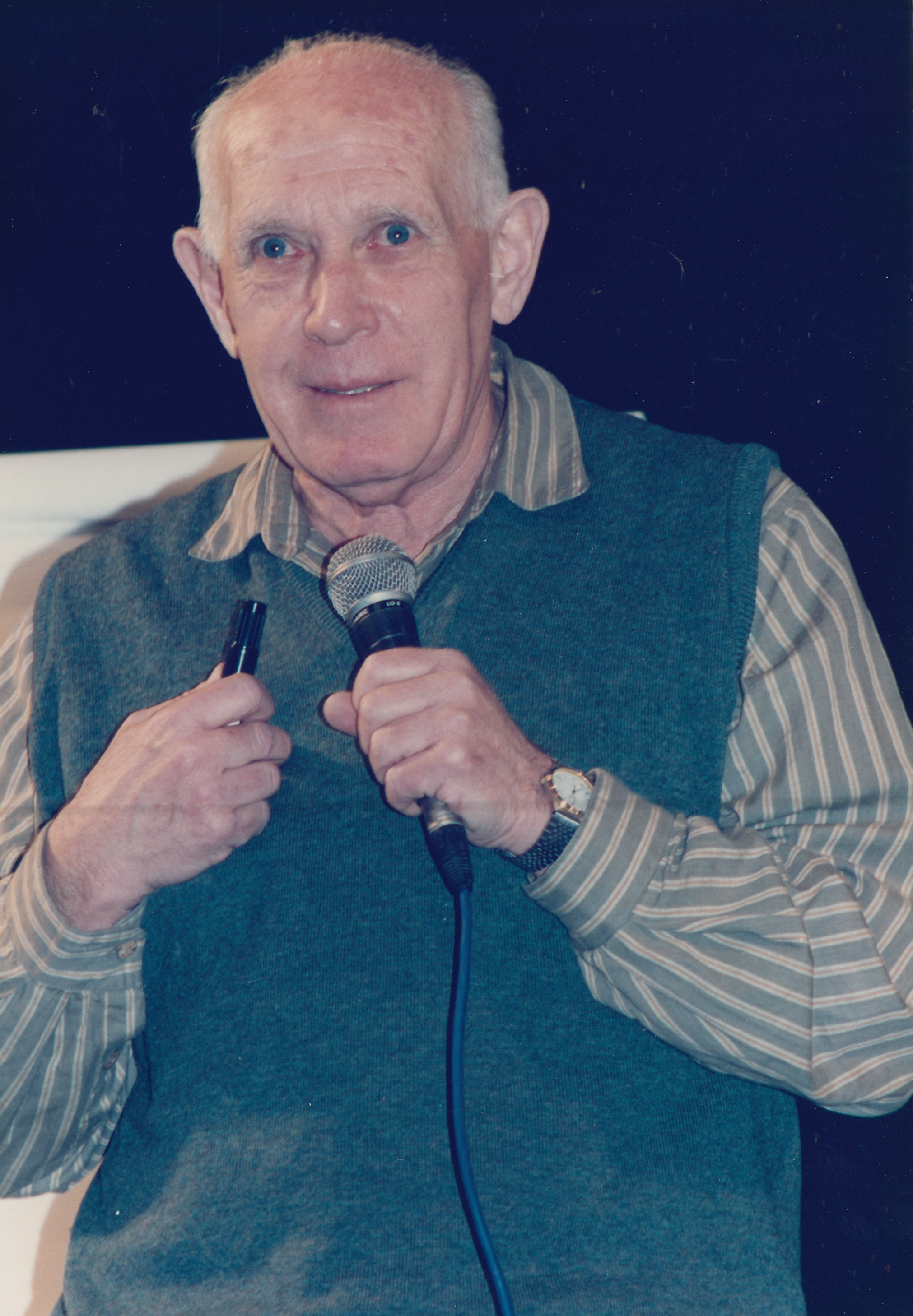
- Born: Yaakov Farkash; 1923; Budapest, Hungary
- Died: 15 October 2002 (aged 78–79)
- Known for: caricaturist and illustrator

Yaakov Farkash (Hebrew: יעקב פרקש; born 31 January 1923, died 15 October 2002), better known by the pen name Ze'ev (Hebrew: זאב), was an Israeli caricaturist and illustrator.

== Biography ==
=== Early life and World War II ===
Farkash was born in Budapest, Kingdom of Hungary, in 1923. At an early age Farkash became interested in painting and at the age of 12 drew caricatures which he published in a newspaper he distributed in his neighborhood. At first he did not foresee himself drawing professionally, in part because he was color blind. In addition, his high school art teacher was not particularly impressed with his ability, calling him "the worst painter in class." Nevertheless, Farkash continued to draw, and in his last year in school drew caricatures of his classmates.

When he finished high school, Farkash wanted to study journalism, but as Jews in Hungary were at that time banned from joining the university, he turned to carpentry instead. In retrospect, the carpentry skills he later acquired saved Farkash from serving in the Russian front during World War II, and instead he was assigned to work as a carpenter in a military camp. Farkash was then sent to the Buchenwald concentration camp and from there to the Dachau concentration camp. After the war Farkash tried to immigrate to Palestine illegally, but was caught by the British forces in Palestine and sent to prison in Cyprus. Throughout this period Farkash continued drawing caricatures in his private diary. He finally managed to immigrate to Israel in 1947 and was recruited to the 7th Armored Brigade, participating in the Battles of Latrun during the 1948 Arab–Israeli War.

=== Early career in the Israeli press ===
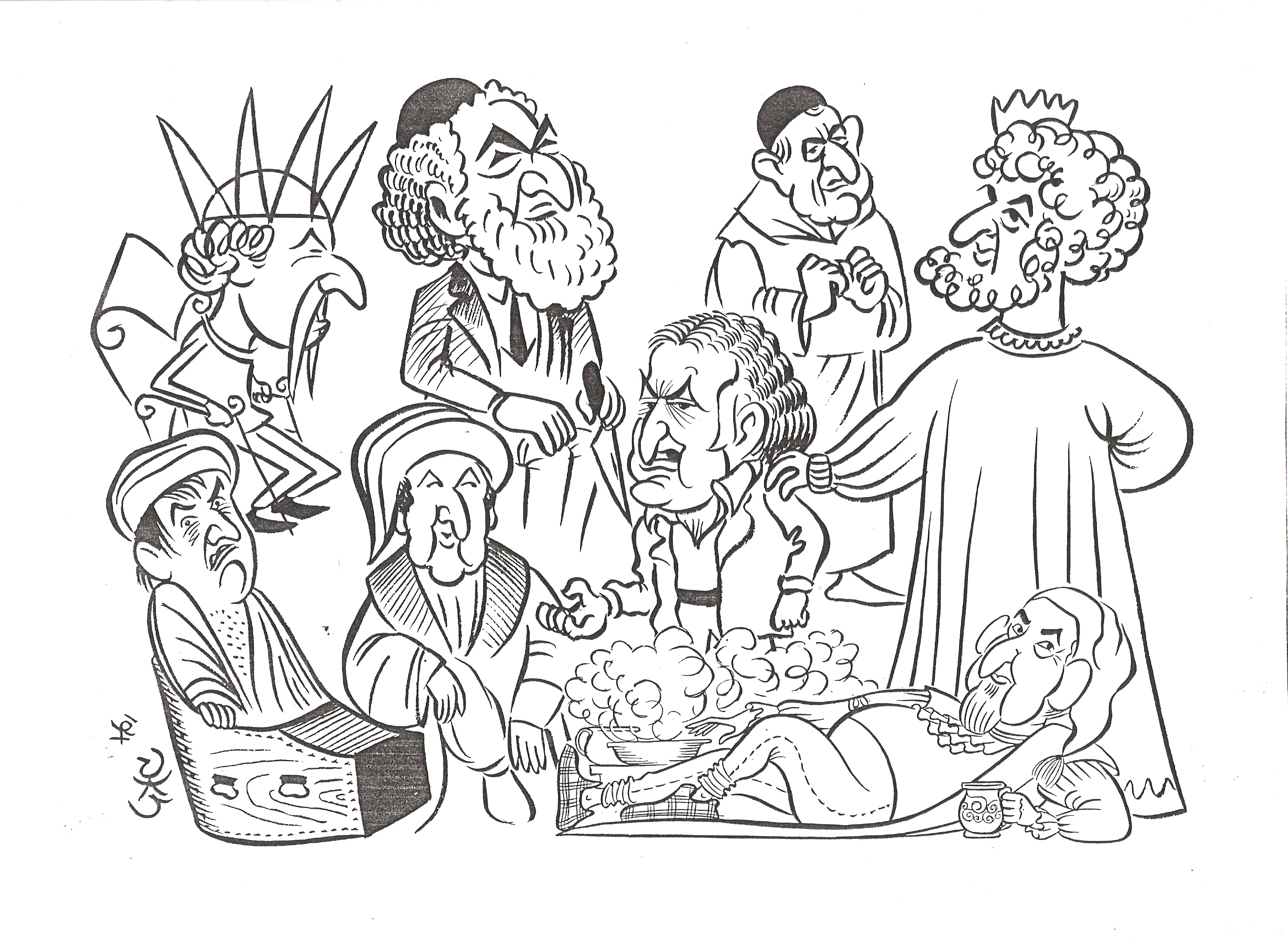
Avner Chiskiyahu, by Ze'ev

During his first years in Israel Farkash worked as a construction worker, building buildings and roads. In addition, Farkash tried selling his drawings, and eventually managed to sell his first caricature to the Israeli newspaper Omer. He then turned to Ephraim Kishon, also born in Hungary, who at the time worked for the Israeli Hebrew-language daily tabloid Ma'ariv. Farkash was hired as a caricaturist by Ma'ariv in 1952, where he used to draw a daily caricature, a new thing in the Israeli press at the time. The newspapers' editors eventually decided that the experiment was not successful, and after a few months Farkash was transferred to work as an illustrator. During this period Farkash began signing his drawings under the pen name "Ze'ev", which derives from his family name ("Farkas" in Hungarian means "Wolf", "Ze'ev" in Hebrew). This followed advice given to him by Ephraim Kishon, who encouraged him to choose a short and sweet name, though it was also a natural pick: as a student in Hungary was called "Lupus", the Latin word for wolf, by his teachers. Later, when he tried to emigrate, he registered under, and went by the name of, "Jonah Wolf" when he was detained in Cyprus.

During the late fifties and early sixties Farkash worked as a caricaturist for the Israeli magazine Davar HaShavua where he used to draw daily caricatures.

=== 1960s until his death ===
In 1962 the Israeli daily newspaper Haaretz hired him to draw daily caricatures. A year later, he was given his own a permanent section in the Friday edition of the newspaper. This section used to feature one big caricature which extended across the whole page, and which included several different current events which were connected under one motif. These caricatures were always accompanied by his own little self-portrait in which he was holding a brush with dripping ink. Farkash continued to work for Haaretz another forty years, until a few months before his death.

Later on Farkash's caricatures were also published in foreign newspapers, including the New York Times and Le Monde, the American magazines Time and Newsweek, and the German magazine Der Spiegel.

Beyond his work as a caricaturist, Farkash also worked as an illustrator, and illustrated through his career dozens of books published in Israel.

Farkash had a great impact on Israeli caricaturists and is widely considered to be one of the greatest political cartoonists in Israel. Through the years Farkash supported and encouraged many young Israeli artists who attempted to enter this field, particularly children and teenagers. Among those whom he encouraged is the successful Israeli cartoonist and caricaturist Michel Kichka.

Farkash died on 15 October 2002.

== Awards ==
Farkash won numerous awards over the years, including the following awards:

- In 1960, the Nordau Prize.
- In 1971, the Schwimmer Prize for Journalism.
- In 1973, the Hertzl Prize.
- In 1981, the Israeli Sokolov Award in the field of Journalism.
- In 1993, the Israel Prize in the field of communications and journalism.

== See also ==
- List of Israel Prize recipients
