= Menachem Zvi Kaddari =

Israeli Hebrew linguist and scholar (1925–2011)

- מנחם צבי קדרי
- Born: Schwarcz Ernő; 18 May 1925; Mezőkövesd, Hungary
- Died: August 17, 2011; Israel
- Education: Pázmány Péter University, Budapest; Rabbinical Seminary of Budapest; Hebrew University of Jerusalem
- Occupations: Linguist, lexicographer, scholar of Hebrew and Semitic languages
- Employer: Bar-Ilan University
- Known for: A Dictionary of Biblical Hebrew; rector of Bar-Ilan University
- Awards: Israel Prize (1999)

Menachem Zvi Kaddari (מנחם צבי קדרי; born Schwarcz Ernő; 18 May 1925 – 17 August 2011) was an Israeli Hebrew linguist and lexicographer, widely regarded as one of the leading scholars of Hebrew linguistics of his generation. He spent five decades at Bar-Ilan University, where he served as a full professor, dean of the Faculty of Humanities, and rector of the university. His most significant work, A Dictionary of Biblical Hebrew (Otzar Leshon ha-Mikra), published by Bar-Ilan University Press in 2006–2007, was the first comprehensive modern Hebrew dictionary of the Hebrew Bible.

== Early life and education ==
Kaddari was born in 1925 in Mezőkövesd, Hungary. He studied philosophy and Semitic languages at the Pázmány Péter University in Budapest, and Jewish bibliography, Bible, and Jewish philosophy at the Rabbinical Seminary of Budapest (1945–46). During World War II he was active in the clandestine pioneering Zionist movement in Hungary, specifically with Bnei Akiva, helping to smuggle and rescue Jews between 1943 and 1946. Following the war he was active in the Jewish internment camps in Cyprus (1946–47) before immigrating to Israel, where he participated in the fighting in Gush Etzion and Jerusalem during the Israeli War of Independence.

After the war he pursued his academic studies in Hebrew, Bible, Jewish philosophy, and Kabbalah at the Hebrew University of Jerusalem (1947–50). In 1953 he submitted his doctoral thesis on the grammar of the Aramaic language of the Zohar, which was subsequently published in 1971.

== Academic career ==
Kaddari joined the faculty of Bar-Ilan University in 1961, where he would remain for the rest of his academic career. He was appointed full professor in 1970. He served as dean of the Faculty of Humanities from 1967 to 1970, and as rector of the university from 1971 to 1974.

He also held visiting positions at several universities abroad, including UCLA (1967), the University of Leeds (1978), and the University of the Witwatersrand in Johannesburg (1979–81).

His major fields of research were Aramaic, Hebrew syntax, Biblical Hebrew, Rabbinic Hebrew, and Modern Hebrew. He was elected a member of the Academy of the Hebrew Language in 1973 and served as its vice president from 1994. He received the Israel Prize for Hebrew linguistics in 1999. A full bibliography of his works and scientific publications appeared in Meḥkarim ba-Lashon ha-Ivrit ha-Attikah ve-ha-Ḥadashah li-Khevod Menachem Zevi Kaddari (Studies in Ancient and Modern Hebrew in Honor of Menachem Zevi Kaddari), edited by S. Sharvit and published in 1999.

== Major works ==
Kaddari's most significant contribution to scholarship is A Dictionary of Biblical Hebrew (אוצר לשון המקרא, Otzar Leshon ha-Mikra), published by Bar-Ilan University Press in 2006–2007. Described as the first modern Hebrew dictionary of the Hebrew Bible, the work spans 1,258 pages and covers the full range of Biblical Hebrew vocabulary from alef to tav. It was preceded by a three-volume partial edition published some twenty years earlier. The dictionary provides etymological notes, comparisons with parallel Semitic languages, and extensive citation of scholarly opinion on grammatical issues.

His other major works include:

- Grammar of the Aramaic Language of the Zohar (PhD thesis, 1953; published 1971)
- Post-Biblical Hebrew Syntax and Semantics: Studies in Diachronic Hebrew (2 vols., Bar-Ilan University Press, 1991 and 1995)

== Personal life ==
Kaddari was the father of Ruth Halperin-Kaddari, professor of law at Bar-Ilan University, founding academic director of the Ruth and Emanuel Rackman Center for the Advancement of the Status of Women, and former vice-chair of the UN Committee on the Elimination of Discrimination Against Women (CEDAW).

== See also ==
- Biblical Hebrew
- Bar-Ilan University
- Hebrew linguistics
- Academy of the Hebrew Language
- Israel Prize
- Ruth Halperin-Kaddari
