= Yated Ne'eman (Hebrew) =

Hebrew-language daily newspaper based in Bnei Brak for a Haredi readership

- Type: Daily newspaper
- Format: Tabloid
- Founded: 1985; 41 years ago
- Political alignment: Haredi
- Country: Israel

Yated Ne'eman (Hebrew: יָתֵד נֶאֱמָן, lit. 'Faithful Stake') is a semi-major Israeli daily Hebrew language newspaper based in Bnei Brak. The Hebrew edition is published daily except on the Jewish Sabbath. A weekly English language edition was published in Israel and distributed in Israel, South Africa and the United Kingdom until December 2006.

An English language newspaper by the same name is published in New York. It was formerly affiliated with the Israeli newspaper, then independent. This article concentrates on the Israeli Yated Ne'eman.

== History ==
The paper was founded in 1985 by Rabbis Elazar Shach (1898–2001) and Yaakov Yisrael Kanievsky (1899–1985). In 1988 Rabbi Shach went on to found the Degel HaTorah political party that later joined forces with Agudath Israel and is called United Torah Judaism. Yated, whose first editor was Rabbi Moshe Grylak, was founded as part of a broad initiative to have a full range of social and communal organizations that specifically serve the Lithuanian Torah community, after it was felt that Agudat Israel, its institutions, and their paper Hamodia no longer represented their point of view.

Yated Ne'eman is controlled by its rabbinic board which had deferred to Rabbis Nissim Karelitz and Aharon Leib Shteinman on all matters pertaining to the content of the newspaper. In the spirit of Rabbi Shach, its ideology is non-Zionist, with strong opposition to both religious Zionism as well as secular Zionism. In May 2016, it opined that Israel is responsible for antisemitism throughout the world, writing that "The State of Israel, which was established to solve the problem of anti-Semitism, has become the main cause of anti-Semitism. The Jews of the world are suffering not because of their religion, but because of the State of Israel and its policies!" and "The natural state of the Jewish people is exile! Its normality is in the pressure cooker of hatred and persecution." In practice, these particular views are reflected in only a handful of articles each year. Most of the content reports news related to the religious community and articles supporting their ideology which is based on Torah study and mitzvah observance and does not define its basic identity in political terms.

Since December 2006, the Chareidi Dei'ah Vedibur website has continued offering weekly news coverage and occasional religious content in English. The website is edited by the publicist Mordecai Plaut.

The Yated Neeman newspaper published in New York was originally affiliated with the Jerusalem paper of the same name, but is no longer affiliated due to a schism.

== Censorship ==
On April 3, 2009, the paper published a manipulated picture of Israeli cabinet ministers to conform to Religious sensitivities of its readers. Female cabinet ministers Limor Livnat and Sofa Landver were digitally removed from the published picture and replaced with male ministers Ariel Atias and Moshe Kahlon.

In 2015, the newspaper refused to print advertisements for the political campaign of U'Bizchutan, a newly formed political party dedicated to the needs of Haredi women and including female candidates on its slate. Ruth Kolian, head of the party, then petitioned the court to stop the discriminatory practice. The party prevailed and the court ordered the newspaper to accept the advertisements. The court rejected the claims made by the news organizations that they might offend customers by publishing ads for the Haredi women's party. The head of the Rackman Center for the Advancement of the Status of Women at Bar-Ilan University's Law Faculty, Professor Ruth Halperin-Kaddari, called the court decision "a historic legal precedent which determines that in certain circumstances, considerations of equality for women and election equality, as well as preventing discrimination against women and their preventing their exclusion, surpass property rights of commercial bodies like newspapers. Haredi women are not only prevented in practice from realizing the basic human right of running and being elected for Knesset, they are also denied the equal opportunity to inform their potential voters that they are running independently." Nevertheless, the paper still refused to publish the advertisement and it never ran.

== See also ==
- List of Israeli newspapers
- Lithuanian Judaism
