= Leila Ladani =

Iranian-American mechanical engineer

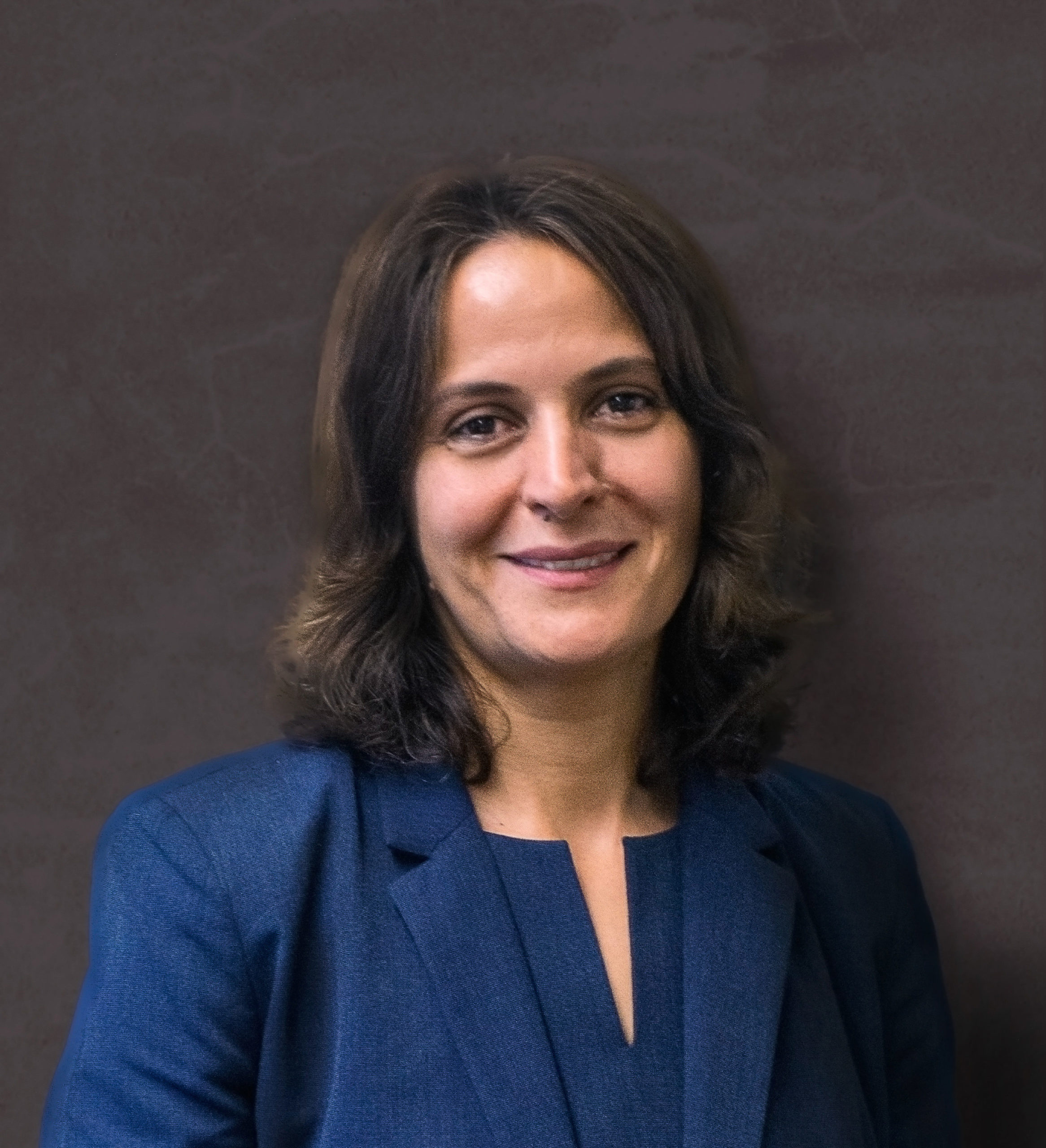

Leila Jannesari Ladani is an Iranian-American scientist, engineer and professor of mechanical engineering specializing in the manufacturing engineering of additive manufacturing through laser sintering and laser melting, including the computer modeling of these processes and the mechanical and thermal reliability of the resulting products. She has also researched in the area of biomedical devices design and manufacturing. She is a professor in the Department of Aerospace and Mechanical Engineering, in the Ira A. Fulton Schools of Engineering of Arizona State University. She is internationally recognized for her research on advanced and multi-scale manufacturing and mechanics of materials. She is involved in graduate education and is an active player in the areas of graduate education at the interface of STEM Science, technology, engineering, and mathematics and Medicine.

== Education and career ==
Leila Ladani received her doctorate in mechanical engineering from University of Maryland at College Park, in 2007. Prior to that she received her master's degree in mechanical engineering in heat and fluid (with honor) and another master's degree in solid mechanics and her bachelor's degree in mechanical engineering..

She has held faculty positions at Utah State University, the University of Alabama, the University of Connecticut, and the University of Texas at Arlington, before moving to Arizona State University in 2019 to direct The Polytechnic School, one of six component schools of the Ira A. Fulton Schools of Engineering. She is currently professor of Mechanical and Aerospace Engineering. She is the editor of Journal of Materials Science and Engineering A.

== Book ==
Ladani is the author of Additive Manufacturing of Metals: Materials, Processes, Tests, and Standards (DEStech, 2021).

== Recognition ==
Ladani has received numerous awards and recognitions for her work including Surface Mount Technology Association Hutchins Grant, and Zonta International Amelia Earhart award. Ladani was the 2015 recipient of the Women In Engineering Award of the ASME Electronic & Photonic Packaging Division. She was named an ASME Fellow in 2020.
