= Lo Nivcharot, Lo Bocharot =

Israeli feminist movement

Lo Nivcharot, Lo Bocharot (Hebrew: לא נבחרות, לא בוחרות, lit., Not elected, won't vote) is a Haredi feminist movement in Israel. The movement is also known as LoNiLoBo or Nivcharot (Hebrew: feminine form of "elected").

The movement started as a Facebook page launched by Esty Shushan in October 2012, to protest the exclusion of Haredi women from Haredi political parties and from the Haredi public sphere in general. The Facebook page called upon Haredi women and men to refrain from voting to parties that exclude women, i. e., Shas and United Torah Judaism.

The protest was extensively covered by various media outlets, but was received with intense criticism by mainstream Haredi public figures.

== Historical background ==
The struggle for women's suffrage in Israel started in 1918, following the Balfour Declaration, when the women of the Yishuv (the pre-state Jewish community) sought to take on an active role in public institutions – as voters and representatives. The women's wishes were met with harsh resistance. At the heart of the struggle stood the question of whether women are indeed entitled to vote and run for office. The counter-campaign was primarily conducted by the members of the old Yishuv in Jerusalem, Haredi communities and even the Mizrahi movement. After a prolonged struggle, women in Israel received the right to vote and run for office.

However, in the years that passed, Haredi women remained excluded from the public and political arenas. It was assumed that they do not wish to demand political representation for women, or to run for office and represent the public. The Haredi parties – Agudat Yisrael, and later on Shas and United Torah Judaism – have never included women on their candidate lists for the general and municipal elections.

== Protest ==
In October 2012, a few months ahead of the elections for the 19th Knesset, Esty Shushan – a Haredi publicist and filmmaker – opened a Facebook page urging Haredi women not to vote for the Haredi parties to which they are accustomed to give their voice, as a first step on the path to integrating Haredi women into the public and political Haredi institutions in Israel.

Following this protest, pioneering attempts were made by Haredi women to run for municipal posts in the municipal elections that were held in October 2013. One of the most prominent attempts was the women's party Ir V'em, headed by Michal Zernowitski, in El'ad.

The protest campaign continued during the elections for the 20th Knesset in 2015. It was led by Esty Shushan, Estee Rieder Indursky, Tali Farkash, Michal Zernowitski, and Racheli Ibenboim. In December 2014, they sent a public letter to the Haredi Members of Knesset, in which they laid out their request to have women representatives in Shas and United Torah Judaism. The campaign garnered extensive media coverage and contributed to the discussion among the general and Haredi society concerning the rights and status of Haredi women in their community, and the Israeli society as a whole. A Haredi women's party called "Bizchutan" even ran in this election campaign, headed by Ruth Colian. However, the women of Nivcharot did not support it, arguing that a Haredi women's party is irrelevant, and that women can only have an impact from within the established Haredi parties.

Nivcharot executed various public actions, such as posting pashkvils (Haredi posters) in Haredi neighborhoods throughout Israel and distributing pamphlets containing an halachic discussion about women's representation. The pamphlets were distributed in Haredi neighborhoods and yeshivas, and even given to the MKs of the United Torah Judaism party during their election assembly. The members of Nivcharot have also published numerous articles regarding this issue, and have been interviewed by Haredi and general media outlets in Israel and other countries.

== Reactions ==
Despite the extensive and positive coverage garnered by the protest movement in the general media, it was received with harsh criticism by the Haredi mainstream. For example, in a video lecture published on YouTube in December 2014, Rabbi Mordechai Neugroschel stated that the essence of Haredi Judaism is wishing to live by the will of God, not only by His commandments written down in the Torah, but also their spirit as understood by Torah scholars. Therefore, he claimed, the attempt to force the individual's will for representation upon Torah scholars, under the title "Haredi women", is somewhat "schizophrenic". Following that, he presented the halachic prohibition that prevents, in the eyes of key religious scholars, the appointing of women to public positions.

The women of Nivcharot have even received various threats, including a declaration made by Mordechai Bloy, number 48 on United Torah Judaism's Knesset candidate list, who wrote in an internal pamphlet that "any woman who comes near a party that is not guided by the leading rabbis – will receive no ketubah, and it is prohibited to study in her educational institutions, or to purchase any product from her, and it is a mitzvah to remove all of her children from the institutions [...], and the same applies also to men". This pamphlet has led the Deputy Attorney General, Dina Silber, and the Chair of the Israeli Central Elections Committee, Justice Salim Joubran, to send a harsh letter condemning this statement to the heads of all parties registered in Israel, threatening legal sanctions.

Contrary to this criticism, Yitzhak Ravitz, the chairman of Degel HaTorah party in Beitar Illit, stated in January 2015 that if an halachic permission is granted, there appears to be no reason why women cannot conduct parliamentary work as well. His statement raised a public storm, and he wrote a clarification letter in which he emphasized that according to Halacha, women are prohibited from serving as public representatives. In addition, ahead of the elections for the 20th Knesset, the Chairman of Shas, Aryeh Deri, announced – in a joint press conference with Adina Bar Shalom – the establishment of a "women's council" that will advise the party and will be headed by Bar Shalom and Yaffa Deri.

== After the 2015 elections ==
In 2015, Lo Nivcharot, Lo Bocharot was registered as an association under the name Nivcharot. The movement states that its goal is the inclusion of women in existing Haredi political institutions, and it opposes the establishment of women-only parties.
