= Migdalei Ne'eman =

Coordinates: 32°8′14.48″N 34°47′38.87″E

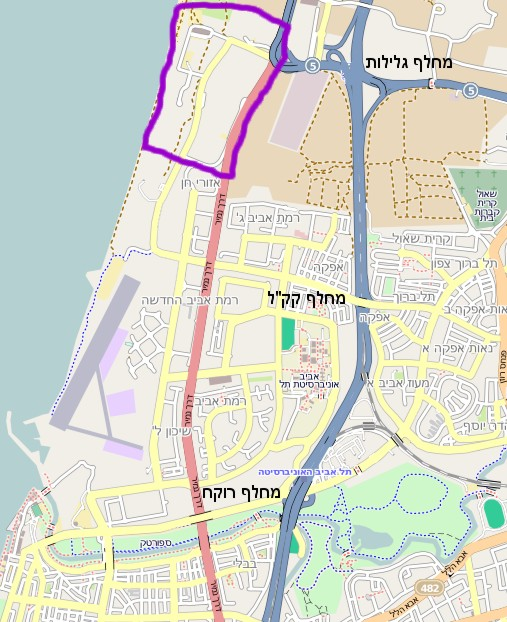

Migdalei Ne'eman is a residential neighborhood of Tel Aviv, Israel. It is located in the northwestern part of the city.

The neighborhood is exclusive high rise and is near the sea. It is built in phases since the 1990s. Construction has been plagued by some land ownership disputes.

== See also ==
- History of Tel Aviv
