= Ruth Halperin-Kaddari =

Israeli legal scholar and international women's rights advocate

Professor Ruth Halperin-Kaddari
- רות הלפרין-קדרי
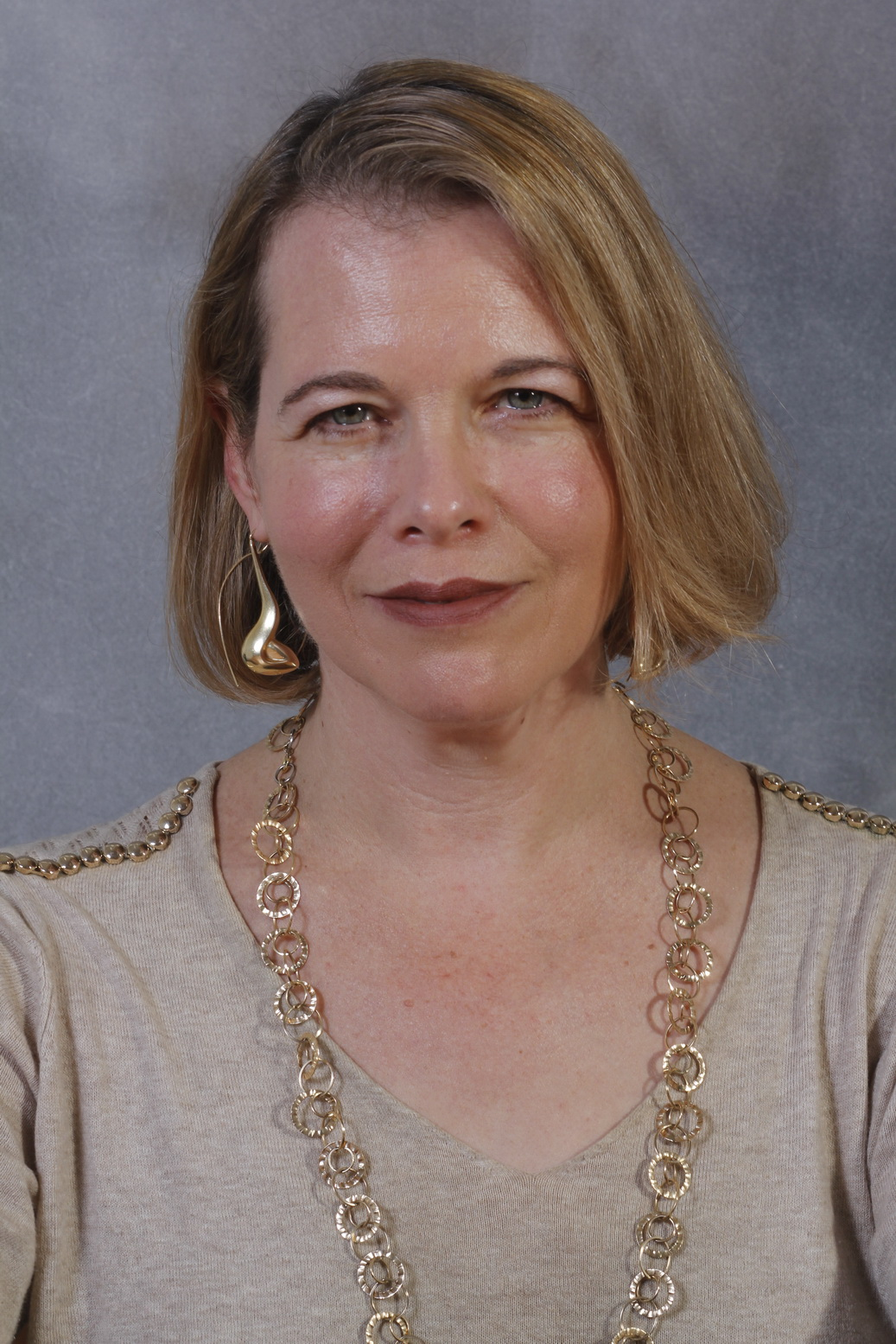
- Halperin-Kaddari in 2015

Member of the United Nations Committee on the Elimination of Discrimination against Women
- In office 2006–2018

Personal details
- Born: 15 May 1966 (age 60)
- Education: Yale Law School
- Occupation: Law professor
- Awards: International Women of Courage Award

Ruth Halperin-Kaddari (רות הלפרין-קדרי; born 15 May 1966) is an Israeli legal scholar and women's rights advocate specializing in family law, feminist legal theory, and international women's rights. She is a full professor at the Bar-Ilan University Faculty of Law and the founding academic director of the Ruth and Emanuel Rackman Center for the Advancement of the Status of Women. From 2006 to 2018 she served on the United Nations Committee on the Elimination of Discrimination Against Women (CEDAW), twice as its Vice-Chair. She was among the first recipients of the U.S. Secretary of State's International Women of Courage Award in 2007.

== Early life and education ==
Halperin-Kaddari is the daughter of Menachem Zvi Kaddari, a noted linguist and expert on ancient Semitic languages who served as rector of Bar-Ilan University. She studied law at Bar-Ilan University, graduating with an LL.B. in 1989. She subsequently earned an LL.M. in 1990 and a Doctor of Juridical Science (J.S.D.) in 1993, both at Yale Law School, where her doctoral dissertation examined the interaction between religious systems of adjudication and the secular legal system.

== Academic career ==
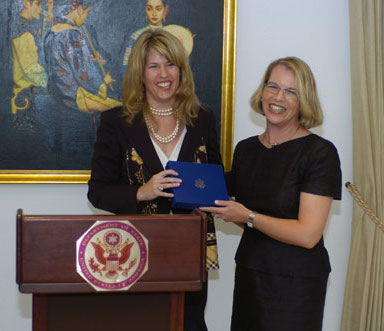
Director Andrea Bottner (left) of the U.S. State Department presenting the Secretary of State's International Women of Courage Award to Professor Ruth Halperin-Kaddari (right)

Halperin-Kaddari joined the Bar-Ilan University Faculty of Law, where she has taught family law, feminist perspectives on law, women and religion, and international women's rights. She served as an advisor to the Prime Minister's Office on the status of women in Israel, and as a member of the Committee on Family and Rabbinical Courts' Jurisdiction at the Ministry of Justice.

In December 2024 she received an honorary degree from Brandeis University.

== The Rackman Center ==
In 2001 Halperin-Kaddari founded the Ruth and Emanuel Rackman Center for the Advancement of the Status of Women at Bar-Ilan University's Faculty of Law, named in part after Rabbi Emanuel Rackman, the Modern Orthodox scholar and former Bar-Ilan chancellor who had championed the cause of agunot — women unable to remarry because their husbands refuse to grant a religious divorce. The Center operates as a research institute, legal aid clinic, and advocacy organization, and has served as the primary vehicle for Halperin-Kaddari's work at the intersection of Israeli civil law and Jewish religious law.

The Center's original mandate focused on agunot advocacy and legal representation of women in the rabbinical courts, working within the framework of Jewish law. Over time its scope expanded significantly into civil rights advocacy, domestic violence legislation, and structural reform of Israeli religious institutions. It drafted the electronic monitoring bill that became law in 2023, allowing Israeli courts to electronically track potentially violent domestic partners. It has also petitioned the Israeli Supreme Court successfully on the composition of the Chief Rabbinate's Electoral Assembly and on access to rabbinical certification examinations for women, with the latter resulting in a unanimous 2025 ruling requiring the Chief Rabbinate to open its exams to women on equal terms.

The Center publishes HaDin VeHaDayan (הדין והדיין, "The Law and Its Decisor"), a journal devoted to halakhic and legal issues relating to women in the rabbinical court system, and holds an annual conference on Jewish law and women's status.

== CEDAW ==
Halperin-Kaddari was elected by the state parties to a four-year term on the United Nations Committee on the Elimination of Discrimination Against Women (CEDAW) in 2006, at the time its youngest member. She was reelected in 2010 and again in 2014, completing three full terms in December 2018. She served twice as Vice-Chair of the Committee and as the first Chair of its Working Group on Inquiries.

During her tenure on CEDAW she led two significant initiatives. In 2013 she initiated and led the adoption of General Recommendation No. 29 on the economic consequences of marriage, family relations, and their dissolution — a landmark interpretive instrument applied internationally in family law reform. In 2017–2018 she conducted CEDAW's official inquiry into Northern Ireland's restrictive abortion laws, co-authoring the UN report that concluded the legal prohibition on abortion constituted a form of violence against women. The report's findings contributed to the decriminalization of abortion in Northern Ireland in 2019, which was described as an unprecedented outcome in international human rights law.

She served on the committee alongside former French minister of gender equality Nicole Ameline and UN Under-Secretary-General Pramila Patten.

== The Dinah Project ==
Following the sexual violence of the October 7, 2023 Hamas attacks, Halperin-Kaddari co-founded The Dinah Project with military prosecutor Sharon Zagagi-Pinhas and lawyer and judge Nava Ben-Or, to document and pursue justice for victims of sexual violence committed during the attacks.

== Selected publications ==
=== Books ===
- Women in Israel: A State of Their Own. University of Pennsylvania Press, 2004.
- The UN Convention on the Elimination of All Forms of Discrimination Against Women: A Commentary (2nd ed., co-edited with Patricia Schulz, Beate Rudolf, and Marsha A. Freeman). Oxford University Press, 2022.
- The Dinah Project (with Sharon Zagagi-Pinhas and Nava Ben-Or). Jerusalem, 2025.

=== Selected articles ===
- "Women, Religion and Multiculturalism in Israel," 5 UCLA Journal of International Law and Foreign Affairs 339 (2000).
- "Towards Concluding Civil Family Law — Israel Style," 17 Mehkarei Mishpat (Bar-Ilan Law Studies) 105 (2001).
- "Co-Optation, Competition and Resistance: Mediation and Divorce Professionals in Israel," 14 International Journal of the Legal Profession (2007).
- "Economic Consequences of Marriage and Its Dissolution: Applying a Universal Equality Norm in a Fragmented Universe," 13 Theoretical Inquiries in Law (2012).
- "Backlash Goes Global: Men's Groups, Patriarchal Family Policy, and the False Promise of Gender-Neutral Laws," 28 Canadian Journal of Women and the Law (2016).
- "The Growing Trend of Divorcés without Divorce," Iunei Mishpat (2020).

== Recognition ==
Halperin-Kaddari was among the first recipients of the U.S. Secretary of State's International Women of Courage Award in 2007. In 2016 she received the Rappaport Prize for Women Generating Change in Israeli Society. In 2018 she was named on Apolitical's list of the 100 most influential people in gender policy worldwide. She received an honorary degree from Brandeis University in December 2024.

In 2025 she was awarded the Shield of Transparency Award by Transparency International Israel for the Dinah Project.

== See also ==
- The Rackman Center
- Agunah
- Committee on the Elimination of Discrimination Against Women
- Get (divorce document)
- The Dinah Project
