= László Ladányi =

Hungarian writer (1907–1992)

- לאסלו לדאני
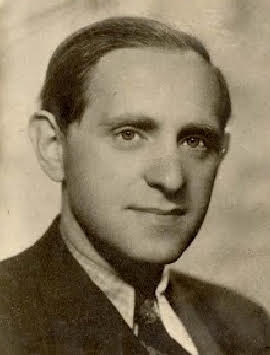
- Born: October 24, 1907; Budapest, Hungary
- Died: January 8, 1992 (aged 84); Tel Aviv, Israel
- Occupations: Poet, author, dramatist and reporter
- Spouse: Edit Utassy
- Children: Éva (Ladányi) Dori
- Awards: 1971 - Herzl Prize; 1975 - Nordau Prize

Signature
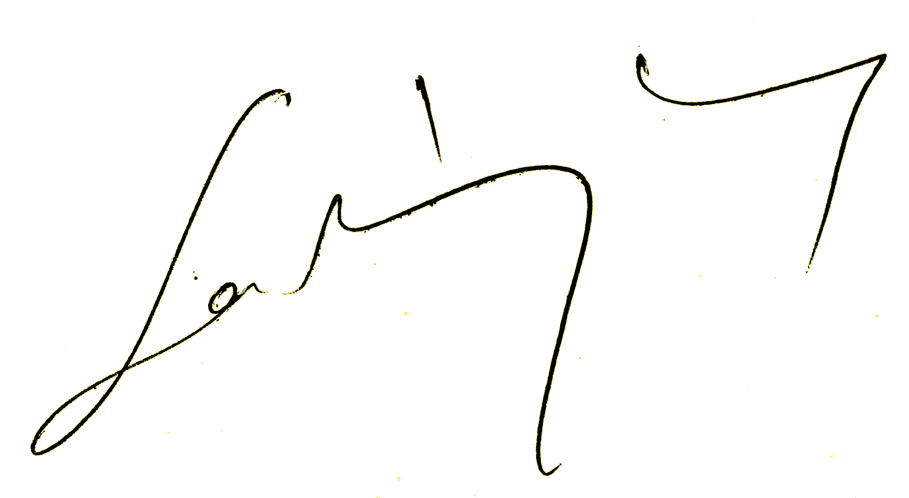

László Ladányi (Hungarian pronunciation: [ˈlaːsloː ˈlɒdaːɲi]; Hebrew: לאסלו לדאני; October 24, 1907, in Budapest – January 8, 1992, in Tel Aviv) was a poet, author, dramatist and reporter.

== Biography ==
As a young man, László Ladányi was already a recognized author in Hungary. After emigrating to Israel at the age of 50, he continued writing in Hungarian. His writings appeared in the press, both in Israel and abroad. While living in Hungary, he wrote mostly poetry and drama but after moving to Israel, he discovered a new writing genre and started creating prose: short stories and short novels.
His critics attest to his short stories, diverse style, a realistic vision combined with poetic symbolism, dealing with lyrical and philosophical themes. A recurring motif in many of his stories is the eternal longing of man for joy and beauty, while helplessly swept in the torrent of blind fate, in the terrifying shadow of war. At the same time, his satirical writings, interspersed with fine humor, bear testimony to Ladányi's zest for life and to his faith in the victory of humanism and common sense.

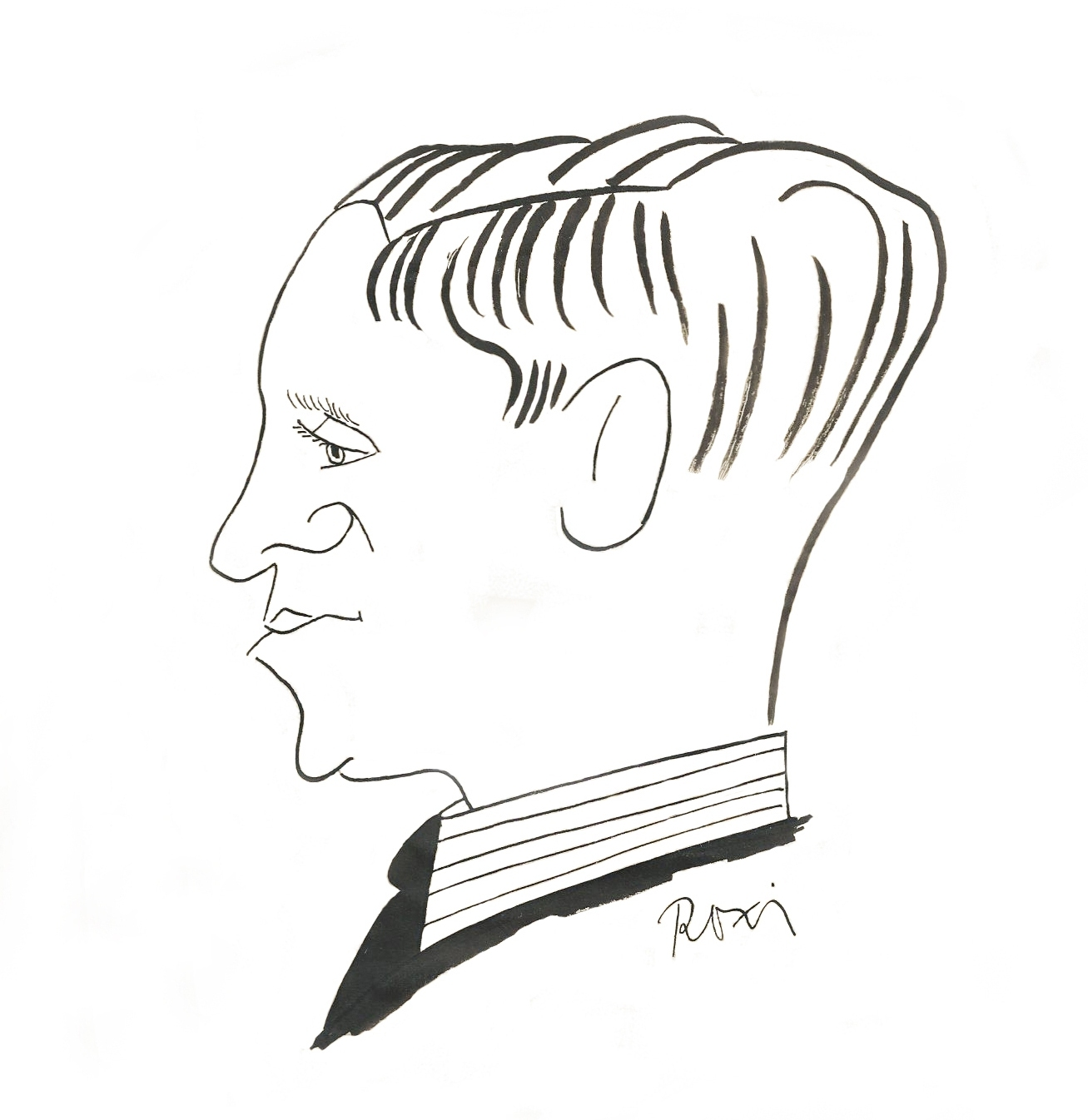
Caricature of László Ladányi

=== His life and work in Hungary ===
In 1925, Ladányi graduated from the high school of the Budapest Academy of Commerce. His writing talent became evident in his early youth. He published his first poem in 1923 in the literary paper "Új Századok" (New Centuries), after which his poems were frequently printed in the Budapest periodicals. Between 1936 and 1949 he became a regularly published poet in the literary weekly (Note: Hungarian art and literature weekly, first published in 1894. Became the most widely distributed literary periodical in Hungary. It printed the works of some of the best Hungarian authors and poets. It closed down in 1949.) "Új Idők (1894-1949)" (New Times) and was included in several anthologies.
Ladányi's first volume of poems, "Az éjszaka csodája" (Mystery of the Night) came out in 1940. In the same year, he was forced to join the Hungarian labour service, where he languished almost continuously until 1944. In February 1943 he received a one-day leave to marry Edit Utassy, with whom he lived until his death. He described these hard times in his autobiographical novel "My Life’s Carousel", as well as in numerous poems. While yearning for home and his wife – the love of his life – he was subjected to years of humiliation by his commanders, to hard labour, hunger and devastating cold. At the end of 1944, after the Nazis had occupied Hungary and his company was stationed in Romania, he managed to escape and hide in Romanian villages, thereby saving his life. Upon returning home in 1945 after the war, he found out that his parents and many of his relatives had been murdered. Only his sister and wife survived.
In 1945 Ladányi became a member of the newly established Hungarian Writers’ Association. He published poetry, articles, plays and children's stories. His three-act rhymed play was successfully produced in a Budapest theatre in 1953. The radio broadcast many of his works, including a three-act musical play, a rhymed satirical drama, several short plays, poems and dramatized stories.
In May 1957, in the wake of the Hungarian Revolution, he emigrated to Israel with his wife and daughter and lived there until his death.

=== The Israeli period ===
During his first years in Israel, Ladányi made a living as a photographer. His photos won prizes and participated in exhibitions in the building of the Israeli Journalists’ Association. Between 1967 and 1977 he worked at the Ministry of Communications as a technical draftsman.
At the same time, he continued writing in Hungarian. His short stories and serial novels were regularly published in the Israeli Hungarian press: the daily "Új kelet" (New East), the weekly "A hét" (The week) and the literary quarterly "Kútfő" (Source). (Note: Periodical review of literature, art and society) He also translated short stories from Hebrew and English for the Hungarian press.
In 1957 he became a member of the London-based Hungarian Writers’ Association Abroad. For 25 years he published short stories, poems and articles in the emigrant Hungarian writers’ literary gazette "Irodalmi Újság". (Note: Hungarian Literary Gazette, first printed in Hungary in 1950. For spiritually pioneering the 1956 Hungarian revolution, it was closed down and its editors, together with many other writers, had to relocate to Western Europe and continue their activities in exile. In 1957 the periodical was resumed first in Vienna, later in London, supported by the American Congress for Cultural Freedom. It became the mouthpiece of the Hungarian writers in exile. In 1962 it moved to Paris. In 1989 it was published in Budapest again but closed down after two issues.) As a foreign correspondent of the periodical, in 1961 he documented the Eichmann Trial in a series of articles. His short stories were also printed in the London "Népszava" (People's Voice), (Note: Hungarian paper published in London. Edited by emigrated politician Kéthly Anna between 1957-1964.) and in the Munich-based Hungarian language monthly (1957-1961) "Látóhatár" (Horizon).
In recognition of his literary activities, Ladányi won the Herzl Prize (1971) and the Nordau Prize (1975). In 1970 he became a member of the Israeli Writers’ Association. Many of his stories were translated to Hebrew and published in the Israeli Hebrew press, some of them were also included in anthologies. His books were published in both Hungarian and Hebrew.
Died at the age of 84.

== Selected works ==
- Az éjszaka csodája (Mystery of the Night), Poems; Budapest 1940.
- Élet és halál között (Between Life and Death), Poem in prose; 1962.
- Tűzözön (Fireflood), Short stories, illustrated by his daughter Éva Ladányi; Tel Aviv 1968.
- Halon Barakia (Window in the Sky), Short stories in Hebrew translation, illustrated by his daughter Éva Ladányi; Tel Aviv 1974.
- A lángoló özvegy (Hot Widow), Humoristic novel and short stories, illustrated by his daughter Éva Ladányi Dori; Tel Aviv 1980.
- Őszi verőfény (Bright Autumn Sun), Poems; Tel Aviv 1982.
- Látomás a falnál (Vision at the Wall), Novel and short stories; Tel Aviv 1984.
- Barátom a dzsinn (My Friend the Jinn), Humorous sketches, short stories and poems; Tel Aviv 1985.
- Életem körhintája (My Life's Carousel), Novel and short stories; Tel Aviv 1987.
- Francia négyes (French quartet), Short stories and poems; Tel Aviv 1989.
- A lángoló özvegy (Hot Widow), Novel and short stories; Budapest 1990.
- Gan haprahim shel Alex (Alex's Garden), Short stories in Hebrew translation; Tel Aviv 1994.

== Awards ==
1971 - Herzl Prize for literature and poetry
1975 - Nordau Prize for literature

== See also ==
- Petőfi Literary Museum - Biographical index
- Petőfi Literary Museum – List of works of Ladányi László
- Hungarian Electronic Library
- Hungarian Archive - About Ladányi László
- Hungarian Archive - List of works of Ladányi László
- National Széchényi Library catalogue
