= Piroska Jancsó-Ladányi =

Hungarian serial killer (1934–1954)

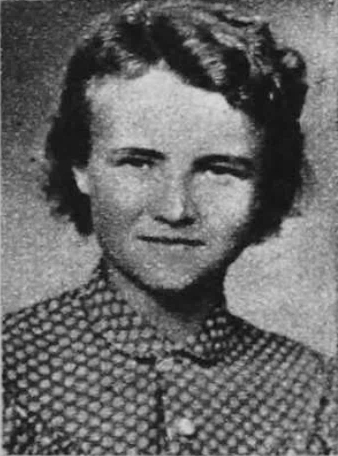
- Portrait of Piroska Jancsó-Ladányi
- Born: Piroska Mária Ladányi; 15 January 1934; Törökszentmiklós, Hungary
- Died: 12 December 1954 (aged 20); Szolnok Prison, Szolnok, Hungary
- Cause of death: Execution by hanging
- Motive: Sexual gratification • Necrophilia • Robbery
- Convictions: Murder x5 Attempted murder x1 Fraud x5 Theft x1
- Penalty: Death

Details
- Victims: 5
- Span of crimes: 1953–1954
- Country: Hungary
- State: Jász–Nagykun–Szolnok
- Date apprehended: 2 September 1954

Piroska Jancsó-Ladányi (born Piroska Mária Ladányi; 15 January 1934 – 12 December 1954) was a Hungarian serial killer who killed five teenage girls in Törökszentmiklós between 1953 and 1954 in order to satisfy her sexual urges. Hanged in 1954, she remains one of the most infamous and insidious killers in Hungarian criminal history, with her case covered extensively in the novel Little Saints by author Szilárd Rubin.

== Family history and early life ==
Piroska's mother, Borbála, was born on 1 May 1909, as one of 16 children of postman János and street sweeper Mária. Twelve of her siblings died in infancy, while two of her sisters would later commit suicide. Borbála lost her father at age 8, leaving the family without any income, resulting in her dropping out of school. At age 16, due to her desperate financial situation, Borbála began to offer sexual services, for which she was shunned by her peers. Officially, she worked as a maid for male farmers who paid off her living and housing expenses. As a result of these liaisons, Borbála gave birth to five children to four different fathers.

Piroska Mária was born on 15 January 1934 in Törökszentmiklós, the offspring of Gyula Ladányi, a local farmer; her half-brother, József, was born on 5 August 1943 to Jewish merchant Lipót Weisz. Neither man recognized their paternity at first, but Ladányi was eventually pressured to do so in 1949, paying off an alimony of 600 forints to never deal with his daughter again. Weisz was deported to a concentration camp, and never returned. Due to change in legislation at the time, József became an heir to Weisz's fortune, with the family being given a building at 171 Red Army Road (present-day Széchenyi Street).

The building was regarded as a brothel by local villagers. In a contemporary report, the house was described as a "simple farmhouse, painted in yellow, consisting of three rooms. The two windows of the room faced the street and the kitchen and the pantry looked out onto the porch. The fence was set in the winter, in the summer they just cut through their yard, trampling between meters of weeds on the path, to the kitchen door. The two street windows were covered with tar paper."

Borbála and Piroska were often visited by men to satisfy their sexual needs, for which they were paid in cash, bread or tallow. It was also reported that both had contracted STDs from their casual partners. While Borbála often had sex with the Hungarians, 14-year-old Piroska serviced the Soviet soldiers from the local garrison at the telephone station on the Czégény farm. In her free time, she would wander around the area, stealing and getting drunk. She had attempted to take on several honest jobs, but often quit.

Jancsó-Ladányi finished her education up to the 5th grade, but was noted for reading books and novels about human anatomy. According to one psychiatrist, she had above-average intelligence compared to her peers, wrote poems and spoke fluent Russian. By 1952, she had been prosecuted for a theft, and police had arrested her in several cities. One police officer later claimed that "[Jancsó-Ladányi] lives an immoral lifestyle, and if she could, she would go to the Soviet soldiers, doesn't usually stay at her parents' house, goes out and lives like a tramp rather live a normal life." She also had to undergo treatment for her STDs on three separate occasions.

== Murders ==
In the summer of 1953, Jancsó-Ladányi first met 11-year-old Marika Komáromi, who herded cows in the city's outskirts. A few months later, on 13 October, she met her again in front of the vegetable shop in Törökszentmiklós, standing in line for some fries. It was then that she decided to lure the little girl to her house by promising that there were more fries there. When they reached the house, Jancsó-Ladányi gave her a novel to read, and while Komáromi was reading, she was strangled from behind with an electric wire. After strangling the girl, Jancsó-Ladányi undressed the corpse and then rubbed herself against it. She then covered it up with a blanket, tied a noose around the neck and dragged it out of the house, dumping it down a well.

Based on initial testimonies, it was claimed that the little girl had disappeared near the Czégény farm populated by the Soviets, but nobody present there was questioned by local police. According to one researcher, Tibor Legát, this was a result of the fear the police department felt from the invading forces, and the contemporary belief that no violent crime occurred in socialist countries.

At a witness hearing in the fall of 1954, 13-year-old Mária Markoth testified that the Soviet soldiers did indeed solicit young girls for sex, which was backed up by Ilona Czene, who admitted to prostituting herself to them. However, Czene also claimed that on 27 August 1954, a drunken Jancsó-Ladányi had confessed to her about killing the Komáromi girl with the help of her mother. This account was backed up by yet another witness, Rozália Lajkó, who had come across the pair near the Czégény farm. She had asked them what were they gonna do there, to which little Marika replied to "talk to the Russians", but when queried about what for, she just shrugged. Lajkó parted with them shortly after they reached the homestead, but had seen a soldier come out and greet them. When she went to the authorities, they advised her to remain quiet on the matter, and thereafter suspended the investigation out of fear for repercussions from the soldiers. Jancsó-Ladányi's presence was completely ignored, despite her known association with the troops and the fact that both of her children were born to different fathers serving in the garrison.

On 9 June 1954, Jancsó-Ladányi came across 13-year-old Piroska Hóppal, who was selling chickens at the Törökszentmiklós market. Sensing an opportunity, she lured the girl to the farmhouse, ostensibly to sell her some chickens, but when they arrived, she gave her a book to distract her. While Hóppal was reading, Jancsó-Ladányi strangled her with a wire. Then, according to her later confessions, "[she] looked at the corpse's genitalia, licked it, and then stuck a carrot in her own genitalia, causing her to ejaculate. She then inserted a long broomstick into her vagina. Later, she licked Hóppal's genitalia with her tongue while holding on to her corpse, causing her to ejaculate again". In addition, she stole 200 forints that the girl had on her.

In the spring of 1954, Jancsó-Ladányi became acquaintances with 17-year-old factory worker Irén Simon, who came from Budapest. According to her, Simon was also secretly a lesbian, but rebuffed her advances, as she was afraid of somebody finding out about their intimate relationship. On 9 August 1954, Jancsó-Ladányi lured Simon to the farmhouse, where she strangled her with the electric wire. She undressed her body, but noticed that she was suffering from a venereal disease and refrained from performing any sexual acts with her corpse. She instead dragged the victim's body to the well and dumped it there, before rummaging through her clothes' pockets, stealing 30 forints and then throwing the clothes away.

Two days later, she intercepted 12-year-old Marika Botos at the bus stop in front of the Törökszentmiklós council house. The girl, who came from Mezőtúr, told that she was visiting her godmother for the holidays. Jancsó-Ladányi offered to escort her there, but on the way, she asked Botos to help deliver a package to her farm. When they reached the farmhouse, Jancsó-Ladányi strangled her with a cotton cord. After satisfying her sexual urges with the little girl's naked body, she dragged it to the well and threw it in. She then hid Botos' clothes under her bed, stealing the 7 forints she found on them.

On 14 August, Jancsó-Ladányi approached her fifth victim, 12-year-old Katóká Szőke, on the railway, luring her to the farmhouse under the pretext of helping to carry a package. When they entered the farmhouse, Szőke was given a book to read, while Jancsó-Ladányi snuck up behind her and strangled her with a trouser strap. She then undressed the body, mutilated it and then threw it into the well, keeping the girl's clothes. She then went to the market, selling her victims' clothes and shoes for 15-20 forints a piece. She got the most out of Hóppal's jacket, shirt and sandals, for which she was paid 45 forints.

== Panic, attempted murder and arrest ==
As the disappearances continued, locals began to panic, with parents refusing to allow their children to go out without supervision. The cases were reported to the crime department of the Szolnok Police Headquarters, with some people suggesting that the Soviets were responsible for the abductions. Despite this, no patrols were dispatched and authorities did not ask the parents for photographs of the children, ordering only that a car with a loudspeaker drive around the town and describe the victims.

In 1954, two teenage boys disappeared: Albert Kenyeres on 2 February, and Imre Vígh on 21 June, but it later turned out that both of them had run away from home. The population became increasingly suspicious towards outsiders, especially travelling gypsies and motorists passing through the city, eventually leading to more than a thousand residents of Törökszentmiklós protesting in front of the police station, demanding that the kidnappers be apprehended. There were also rumors that local Jews were kidnapping the children to "use their blood to rebuild the synagogue", and that a local funeral company director was abducting them in his company car.

On 2 September 1954, at 9 o'clock in the evening, Istvánné Balászi, a 21-year-old resident of Pusztakengyel, reported to the Törökszentmiklós police that Jancsó-Ladányi had attempted to rob and then strangle her with a wire. According to her, the two met at the Szolnok-Alcsi railway station, where they got acquainted over their mutual search for a job. The two of them discussed going to the amusement park in Tiszaliget to have some fun, for which they were joined by a man who was carrying Piroska's suitcase. The next morning, Balászi realized that her new companion had stolen her package. Knowing that she worked as a maid, she notified authorities, who found her on a construction site. In the end, Balászi did not make a complaint, as Piroska promised that she would return the suitcase if she accompanied her to Törökszentmiklós. When the pair arrived there, Jancsó-Ladányi gave her some brandy, causing Balászi to feel sleepy and fall asleep in the yard, since the room was dirty and the three small children were scattered around the house. In the evening, she woke up to Jancsó-Ladányi trying to strangle her with a wire, and in her fear, she wrestled off her assailant and escaped. Balászi told a friend working at the police station about the attack, who, together with two of his colleagues, brought Jancsó-Ladányi for interrogation. Since she refused to admit whether she was guilty or not, the authorities went to the farmhouse to find the stolen clothes.

== Investigation ==
While exploring the farmhouse, police found clothing belonging to the girls that had gone missing in recent months, but were unable to find Balászi's property. One of the officers reported to his superior that he had found a mineshaft with a metal cover on the porch behind the gate. When he opened it, he found a 10-12 meter deep well, supposedly built when the older house had been demolished. They lit up the mine to examine it further, only to find human remains covered in water and mud at the bottom. The first officer to go down the well reported that "Down there, in a roughly sitting position, one could see the body of a girl. She was completely naked. Her head leaned to the side, half of her mutilated face protruding from the water. Next to her head was a sole, tossed on the corpse, and a military belt." It took several hours to remove all the corpses, with assistance from firefighters. The discoveries shocked the nation, with even senior military and police officers, as well as ministers, arriving at the crime scene. The police believed that it was improbable that Piroska had managed to commit the murders without the knowledge of her mother, Borbála, she was detained as well.

A report from the on-site inspection described the conditions in the farmhouse: "The building consists of two parts, a kitchen with two beds and a table. [...] There are two pillows on the bed, the color of which could not be determined due to the amount of dirt. The apartment in earthy, including the living room and kitchen. [...] In the middle of the room, there are tables, while behind the back door, there's a 5-pattern cast iron stove set on three bricks. [...] Both rooms are filthy, while the wall, which was once colored white, now cannot be distinguished due to dust and dirt. Both rooms house mice and fleas. The clothing and beddings are unwashed and dirty, as is the cutlery. [...] A side chamber is built near the building... There are two used perforated logs in the side chamber, in addition to human feces."

As the public wasn't informed on the case by officials, there were all sorts of rumors about the number of victims. Among the women gathering round the Törökszentmiklós market, there were claims that there were more girls killed elsewhere and that a boy who had been kidnapped from a cornfield recently was also the victim of the same killer.

The investigation was marred by errors, with the authorities ignoring material signs of guilt (the rope, wire and leather strap). The corpses were placed in five cinnamon-lined wooden crates and shipped to Szolnok, but the stench from the decomposition spread over the area, which later had to be sprayed with chloride. When given to the coroners, the bodies were in very poor condition and it was hard to establish their identity, with the additional difficulty of determining whether the victims had died virgins, as it was known that Jancsó-Ladányi had sodomized them with the broom post-mortem. The parents, who were either unwilling or unable to identify their own children, refused to repatriate the bodies, all of which were buried at Körösi Cemetery in Szolnok on 7 September 1954 in an ornamental tomb, with each grave marked with a wooden cross.

Following the arrest of Piroska and Borbála, the remaining Jancsó children (József, Piros and Mihály) were taken to a child protection institute in Szolnok, and all were later adopted. The farmhouse was left abandoned for a few years, then bought by a new owner, who demolished it and built a new one in its place.

== Confessions ==
The Sunday issue of the newspaper 'Free People', dated 3 October 1954, gave a report on the case: "A multiple child murderer was sentenced to death. On September 29, the Szolnok County Court heard the case of Piroska Jancsó-Ladányi, a resident of Törökszentmiklós, who was accused of fivefold murder, one attempted murder, fivefold fraud and one theft. The investigation and the county court found that Piroska Jancsó-Ladányi - the daughter of kulaks who owned 40 acres - was a morally depraved woman who began her immoral life as a child. Piroska Jancsó-Ladányi committed the most serious crime: she killed children. The county court sentenced Piroska Jancsó-Ladányi to death as a final sentence. Along with her case, the court also discussed the case of her mother, Borbála Jancsó, who was accused of committing the crime of prostitution, crimes against the youth and theft of social property. She was sentenced to two years and six months in prison and banned from exercising her civil rights for another three years."

Due to the nature of her crimes, Jancsó-Ladányi's trial was held in private, attended only by the parents of the murdered girls. She was initially brought on charges of theft, public endangerment and selling stolen property. Throughout the trial, she gave several conflicting confessions, first claiming that she had three accomplices, naming 45-year-old Józsefine Raffael, 23-year-old suitor Sándor Fekete and a Russian soldier. The former two were arrested, but later released as it was verified that neither were in Törökszentmiklós at the time of the murders (Raffael was out of town, while Fekete was serving a prison sentence).

When her mother was brought in to testify, she claimed that Piroska had been a problematic child who often quarreled with other children. According to her, she would attack other children, cutting them in the face and back for no apparent reason, appearing seemingly joyful when she did so. At age 10, on Christmas, she fled from home, a practice she often repeated as a teenager, and in 1951, she attempted to board a train bound for the Soviet Union from Nyíregyháza. She had been prosecuted several times for theft, and in 1953, she was convicted and sentenced to serve six months, but managed to serve only one before she was released under general amnesty. By the age of 13–14, she was already hanging around Soviet soldiers and having sex with them, something Borbála disapproved of and often quarreled with her daughter for. She also said that Piroska loved to eat raw meat, which she suspected got a taste for after killing stray dogs and cats in the neighborhood. The most harrowing revelation from Borbála's testimony was that in 1950, while she was visiting a neighbor, her sister told her that she had forgotten something and returned to the farmhouse to pick it up. When she entered, she found Piroska naked, on all fours, on the floor, forcing her then-7-year-old brother to lick her genitalia. Her sister scolded the girl, who then took a bottle of medicine and attempted to overdose on the pills. During her interrogation, Piroska herself confirmed that she "felt a pleasant feeling" while having intercourse with her half-brother.

At the second interrogation, Jancsó-Ladányi gave another account, naming several Soviet soldiers as the main culprits. In particular, she blamed Nikolai Bogachov, claiming that he had taken a liking to Marika Komáromi, wanting to marry her and bring her back to the Soviet Union with him, promising Piroska that she could join them and father his second child. According to this claim, Bogachov raped Komáromi in the farmhouse while she had gone out for a drink, with the soldier promptly leaving after she returned. The little girl began to threaten to tell her parents, so Piroska, afraid that she would get in trouble, decided to kill Marika. She then said that she strangled the girl for about 10–15 minutes, before throwing her body down in the well. For the second murder, Jancsó-Ladányi claimed that she lured Hóppal to the farmhouse from the market, where she let her be raped by a soldier named Andrei, who subsequently strangled her and threw her body in the well. When it came to the rest of the murders, she claimed that Bogachov committed all of them using his belt, but added that at the final murder, another man, Sgt. Hammelzanov, was also present. In her defense, Jancsó-Ladányi claimed that she helped in the murders because of Bogachov's promise to take her to the Soviet Union, as she wanted to keep in contact with her child's father, fulfilling his demands for her to bring "untouched little girls" for him.

On the next day, Jancsó-Ladányi changed her confession yet again. She now admitted that no Soviets were involved, and that she had committed the crimes due to her attraction towards women. In this account, she claimed to have realized this at the age of 15, when she read a book bought at the market, featuring graphic illustrations of sexual acts between women, including one in which a dog was licking a woman's genitals. Jancsó-Ladányi explained that the earlier confessions were an attempt to hide her unnatural inclinations, of which she was ashamed. Allegedly, she changed her confessions when she was informed by investigators that Bogachov had left Hungary in the summer of 1954, but it is unclear where this information originated from, and whether it was truthful.

The case was forwarded to the Curia of Hungary on 14 October 1954, during which the defendants maintained their previous testimonies. The prosecutor called for a heavier sentence against Borbála Jancsó, on account of her complicity, while Piroska's attorney asked for a pardon, claiming that the girl's upbringing merited leniency. When asked to address the court for her last words, Jancsó-Ladányi said that she wished her sentence be changed, despite acknowledging the gravity of her actions, as she wanted to raise her child. Following the break before the verdict was announced, Piroska told that she wanted to change some details of her previous testimony, confirming that her mother did indeed know about her deeds, and that for the second murder, she had asked her to "bring one from the market with good clothes and money if possible", while the others were committed due to her need for money and to satisfy her sexual needs. She claimed that she was forced into committing more murders, as her mother constantly spent the money on men, confectionaries and alcohol. As a result, the Curia reversed the initial sentence of the Szolnok County Court and sentenced both Piroska and Borbála to death, despite no additional evidence being uncovered in the latter's alleged crimes. Borbála's sentence was eventually commuted to life imprisonment, after a request for pardon was submitted to the Presidential Council of the Hungarian People's Republic. She was initially detained at a prison in Kalocsa, but due to her degrading mental and physical health, she was transferred to the prison hospital in Zalaegerszeg. Borbála died at Kozma Street Prison in Budapest on 10 March 1969.

Several world-famous psychiatrists were recorded as attending the court hearings. Famous Hungarian actor László Mensáros was also present, as he was interested in the case.

== Execution ==
A briefing was ordered in the case, and on 12 December 1954, Piroska Jancsó-Ladányi was hanged in Szolnok Prison. Early in the evening, people gathered in front of the prison, hoping to see the execution when the gates opened. The judges, prosecutors, lawyers and doctors were seated behind a table, joined by the executioner, his assistants and the investigators in the back. Dozens of people were transported by truck from Törökszentmiklós, with the victims' family members being offered a place not far from the execution site. Jancsó-Ladányi's final wish to see her son Mihály was not granted, and shortly after 10 PM, she stepped on the gallows and was summarily hanged. The only record of this event was a short notice that the hanging was successful.

Jancsó-Ladányi was buried in Körösi Cemetery in Szolnok, behind the old funeral home. Her unmarked grave was erected in a plot which, until the late 1950s, was reserved for people who died of suicide, considered a 'non-Christian' death, as well as murderers.

== See also ==
- List of serial killers by country
