= Emanuel Rackman =

American rabbi (1910–2008)

Rabbi Emanuel Rackman
- מנחם עמנואל רקמן
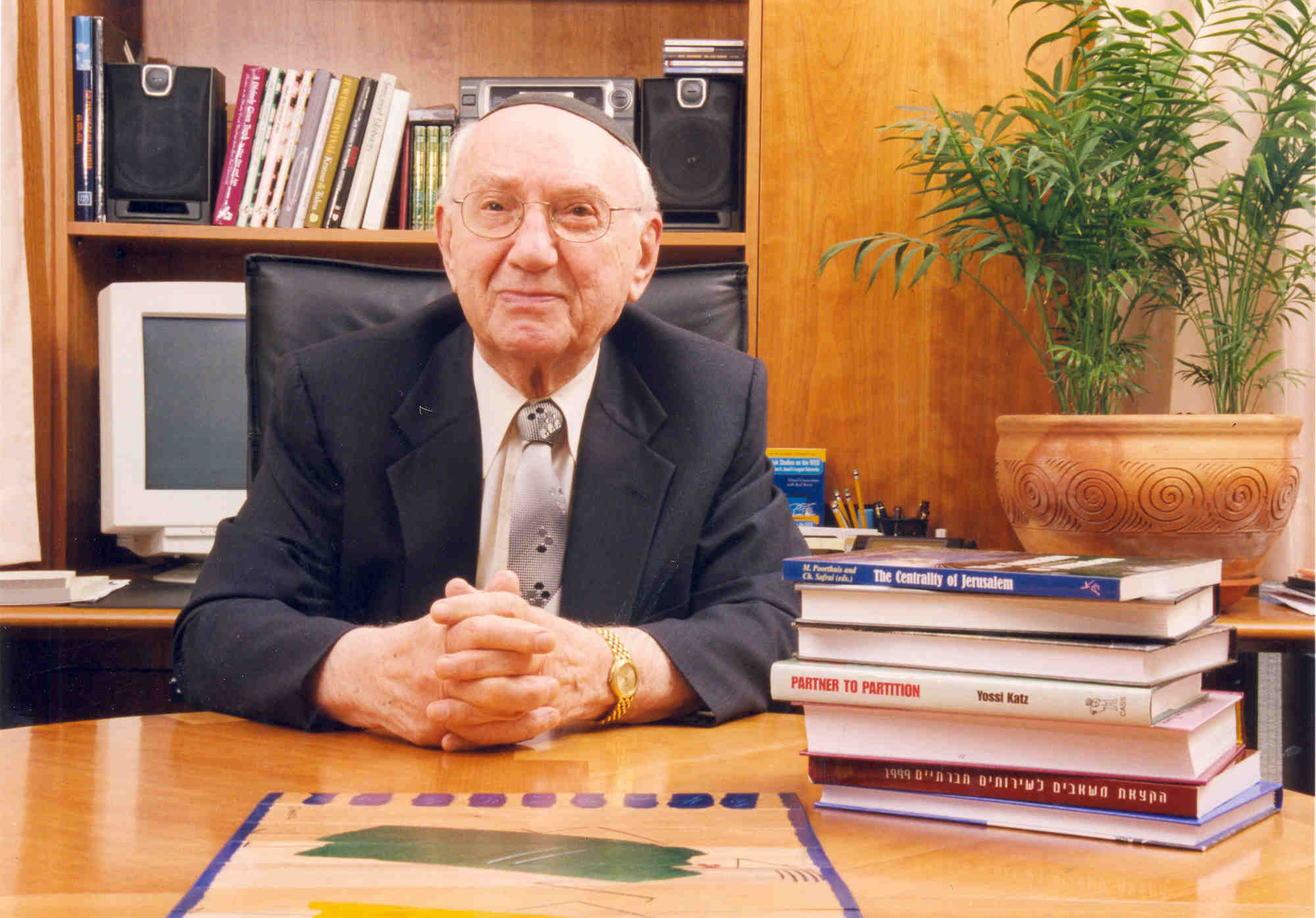

President of Rabbinical Council of America

President of New York Board of Rabbis
- In office 1955–2008

President of Bar-Ilan University
- In office 1977–1986

Chancellor of Bar-Ilan University
- In office 1986–2008

Personal life
- Born: June 24, 1910 Albany, New York
- Died: December 1, 2008 (aged 98) New York, United States
- Spouse: Ruth Fishman
- Children: Rabbi Bennett Rackman
- Education: Columbia University, Rabbi Isaac Elchanan Theological Seminary
- Known for: President of Bar-Ilan University
- Other names: (Menachem) Emanuel Rackman מנחם עמנואל רקמן
- Occupation: Rabbi, educator

Religious life
- Religion: Judaism
- Denomination: Modern Orthodox

Rabbi (Menachem) Emanuel Rackman (Hebrew: מנחם עמנואל רקמן Menachem 'immanuel Raqman; June 24, 1910 in Albany – December 1, 2008) was an American Modern Orthodox Rabbi, president of the RCA, vice-president of Yeshiva University. President of Bar-Ilan University from 1977 to 1986. He held pulpits in major congregations and helped draw attention to the plight of Refuseniks in the then-Soviet Union and attempted to resolve the dilemma of the Agunah, a woman who cannot remarry because her husband will not grant a Get, the required religious divorce decree that would free her to remarry under Halacha.

== Biography ==
Rackman was born in Albany, New York on June 24, 1910. He graduated from the Talmudical Academy in 1927, as its valedictorian. Rackman asked for a one-year deferral from Columbia University, and spent the entire year working towards semicha at Yeshiva University (YU), where he was in the shiur of Rabbi Moshe Soloveichik. The following year he started splitting his time, spending half of each day at Columbia and the other half at YU. He earned a bachelor's degree from Columbia University in 1931 and was awarded a Bachelor of Laws degree in 1933; He was awarded a Doctor of Philosophy from Columbia in 1953. During that time, he also studied for and received his semicha from the Rabbi Isaac Elchanan Theological Seminary of Yeshiva University, which was awarded in 1934, signed by Rabbis Bernard Revel and Moshe Soloveichik.

Rackman practiced law for nine years before his religious service in the military. During that period, he would serve for occasional weekends as a rabbi at communities in Glen Cove and Lynbrook, New York. Rackman entered service during World War II in the United States Army Air Forces in 1943 as a chaplain. He served as a military aide to the European Theater of Operations special adviser on Jewish affairs, where his experiences with survivors of the Holocaust influenced his decision to pursue the rabbinate.

Rackman was the eighth in as many generations to earn rabbinic ordination, but the first to earn a living as a rabbi. He said that "it was my father's hope that I would continue the family tradition, insofar as I could be both learned in the Jewish tradition while making a living in another way".

In the 1950s, the United States Air Force Reserve denied Rabbi Rackman's security clearance, citing him as a "bad risk". In a 1977 profile in The New York Times, Rackman cited his opposition to the death penalty for Julius and Ethel Rosenberg and his support for Paul Robeson as factors behind the decision. Offered the opportunity to resign or face a military tribunal, the Rabbi chose a court martial, where he was acquitted and was shortly thereafter promoted from major to lieutenant colonel.

Rackman served as Rabbi at Congregation Shaarey Tefila, then in Far Rockaway, Queens, which granted him a lifetime contract in 1952. In 1967, after 20 years at Shaarey Tefilla, he accepted a position as Rabbi of the Fifth Avenue Synagogue in Manhattan to succeed Rabbi Immanuel Jakobovits, who had been elected to serve as Chief Rabbi of the United Hebrew Congregations of the Commonwealth. He was elected by his peers as president of the New York Board of Rabbis in 1955. He also served as president of the Rabbinical Council of America.

After a trip to Eastern Europe and the Soviet Union in 1956 as part of a group from the Rabbinical Council of America, Rackman was part of a group of New York-area Rabbis who reported that their experience "leads us to the melancholy conclusion that Judaism in Russia is seriously threatened with extinction", despite improvements in the preceding years for Soviet Jewry. The group noted that the conditions for Jews in Poland were far better, with a government that was actively friendly with the Jewish community there.

Following the publication of Philip Roth's short story "Defender of the Faith" in The New Yorker in 1959, Rackman wrote a letter to the Anti-Defamation League accusing Roth of promoting antisemitism and asking "What is being done to silence this man?"

In 1969, Rackman praised the JDL, claiming that in many instances "the Jewish Defense League has demonstrated its ability to be the instrument presently required by the Jewish community."

In 1970, he was named as provost of Yeshiva University. He was the president of Bar-Ilan University from 1977 until 1986, succeeding Max Jammer and succeeded by Michael Albeck, and served as the school's chancellor until his death.

Rackman worked to address the situation of agunot through the establishment in the early 1990s of the Beit Din L'Ba'ayot Agunot (Court for the Problems of Chained Women), which annulled the marriages of hundreds of women, freeing them to remarry. The court, and its methodology, was widely criticized by other Orthodox rabbis, many of whom would refuse to officiate at the marriage ceremonies of women whose prior marriage had been ended by this form of annulment. Criticism came from across the Orthodox spectrum, with the Haredi Agudath Israel of America calling the court's halachic basis "spurious" and British Chief Rabbi Jonathan Sacks claiming that Rackman's solution exacerbated the problem it was trying to solve.

== Personal ==
Rackman married the former Ruth Fishman in 1930. Rabbi Leo Jung, the bride's uncle, officiated at the ceremony, held at the Jewish Center in Manhattan. His son, Rabbi Bennett Rackman, serves as chaplain at JFK Airport.

Rackman died at age 98 on December 1, 2008.
