= Yated Ne'eman (English) =

Jewish American newspaper

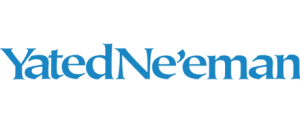
- Type: Weekly newspaper
- Publisher: Pinchos Lipschutz
- Founded: 1987
- Language: English
- Headquarters: Brick, New Jersey
- Circulation: 20,000
- Website: www.yated.com

Yated Ne'eman is an American weekly newspaper and magazine. Published in the English-language, it is a Haredi publication based in Brick, New Jersey, and distributed in most large metropolitan areas where Orthodox Jews reside.

A Hebrew language newspaper by the same name is published in Israel. While the two newspapers were originally affiliated, they are currently operating independently.

== History ==
The American Yated Ne'eman was founded as a spinoff of its Israeli parent, also named Yated Ne'eman, which itself was established in 1985 by Elazar Shach over differences of editorial opinion with Hamodia. This was a result of American Haredi rabbis seeking an alternative outlet for their views, since the widely read Orthodox Jewish weekly in the New York area, The Jewish Press, was privately owned, too independent, and expressed more of a Modern Orthodox and Religious Zionist point of view. The UJA-supported Jewish Week was similarly considered inappropriate.

The publication's name, supposedly attributed to Yaakov Yisrael Kanievsky, is derived from a phrase in Hebrew scripture which translates as 'a peg strongly anchored in terra firma'. It is meant to figuratively describe a secure connection or something which can be relied upon.

In the 1990s, the American Yated severed its relationship with the Israeli edition over perceived complex religious leanings there.

The current publisher is Pinchos Lipschutz, who resides in Lakewood Township, New Jersey.

== Editorial policy ==
Yated Ne'eman's opinions generally reflect the positions and policies of Agudath Israel of America and its leadership body, the American Moetzes Gedolei HaTorah (Council of Torah Sages). Its views on Orthodox Jewish education for example are based upon the educational policies of the rabbis that guide Torah Umesorah - National Society for Hebrew Day Schools. However, its right-wing tendency is sometimes at odds with the rabbinic leadership of Haredi Judaism, who often prefer a more pragmatic, nuanced approach to political issues. The publication, as do most of those within its genre, adhere to a strict interpretation of tzniut that prohibits photographs of women on its pages and website.

=== Israeli politics ===
Yated Ne'eman reports Israeli news extensively, keeping track of social trends, political developments, and military affairs. Its political stance tends to toe the party line of Degel HaTorah, as can be evidenced by the frequent publication of photos extolling the activities of Degel's leaders, such as Chaim Kanievsky.

== Significance ==
The growth of Yated Ne'eman reflects the emergence of a uniquely English-speaking Yeshiva community in the United States that sees itself as independent from the non-Orthodox institutions of earlier generations. Its articles, editorials, photos and advertisements are strictly controlled by the editorial board to reflect the religious mores of the American yeshiva world, as practiced in institutions such as New Jersey's Beth Medrash Govoha, New York's Yeshiva Torah Vodaas and Yeshiva Rabbi Chaim Berlin, and Maryland's Yeshivas Ner Yisroel.

== See also ==
- Haredi news hotlines
