= The Rackman Center =

The Ruth and Emanuel Rackman Center for the Advancement of the Status of Women
- מרכז רקמן לקידום מעמד האשה
- Abbreviation: Rackman Center
- Formation: 2001
- Type: Research institute, legal aid clinic, think tank
- Purpose: Advancing women's rights in Israeli family law and society
- Headquarters: Bar-Ilan University, Ramat Gan, Israel
- Key people: Prof. Ruth Halperin-Kaddari (Founding Academic Director)
- Parent organization: Bar-Ilan University Faculty of Law
- Website: rackmancenter.com

The Ruth and Emanuel Rackman Center for the Advancement of the Status of Women (מרכז רקמן לקידום מעמד האשה), commonly known as the Rackman Center, is an Israeli research institution, think tank, and legal aid clinic at the Faculty of Law of Bar-Ilan University in Ramat Gan. Founded in 2001, it works to eliminate gender discrimination and advance women's rights in Israeli family law and society. The Center takes its name in part from Rabbi Emanuel Rackman, the American-Israeli Orthodox rabbi and scholar who served as Chancellor of Bar-Ilan University and spent decades fighting for the rights of agunot, Jewish women whose husbands refuse to grant them a religious divorce.

The Center was founded by Ruth Halperin-Kaddari, a Bar-Ilan law professor and Yale-trained expert in family law and Jewish law, who remains its Founding Academic Director.

== Background and founding ==
Rabbi Emanuel Rackman (1910-2008) was one of the most prominent figures in Modern Orthodox Judaism in both the United States and Israel. He served as rabbi of the Fifth Avenue Synagogue in New York, president of the Rabbinical Council of America, and later as president and then chancellor of Bar-Ilan University. The problem of agunot was a cause he returned to throughout his career. In 1996 he was the driving force behind a private beit din in the United States set up specifically to free women trapped in failed marriages. His halakhic methods were contested within Orthodox circles, but the commitment behind them was not in doubt.

The Rackman Center opened in 2001 at Bar-Ilan's Faculty of Law. Its stated mission was to eradicate discrimination against women and strengthen their standing in Israeli society by turning academic research into practical legal and policy work. Its founding director, Prof. Ruth Halperin-Kaddari, holds a J.S.D. from Yale Law School and specializes in family law, feminist legal theory, and Jewish law. She went on to serve three terms (2006-2018) on the United Nations Committee on the Elimination of Discrimination Against Women (CEDAW), twice as its Vice-Chair.

== Programs and activities ==
=== Legal aid clinic ===
The Center runs a legal aid program offering free or low-cost representation and advice to women in family law matters. It focuses in particular on women with limited means who are navigating proceedings in both the civil family courts and the rabbinical courts (batei din). The clinic also connects clients with emotional support services, including short-term therapy from social work students and a volunteer accompaniment program for women going through divorce.

=== Agunot advocacy ===
The Center is best known for its work on behalf of agunot, Jewish women whose husbands will not grant a get, the religious bill of divorce that Jewish law requires before a woman can remarry. Israeli law gives the rabbinical courts exclusive jurisdiction over Jewish marriage and divorce, which means a husband's refusal can trap a woman in legal and personal limbo indefinitely.

The Center pursues relief through several channels: direct representation in rabbinical court, pushing for legislation that increases pressure on recalcitrant husbands, and participation in halakhic conferences looking for solutions within Jewish law itself. One approach it has convened discussion around is the conditional marriage agreement (kiddushei ta'ut), under which a marriage could be declared retroactively void under certain conditions. Some Orthodox decisors have endorsed variations of this approach; the Chief Rabbinate of Israel and mainstream rabbinical courts have not.

The Center publishes HaDin VeHaDayan (הדין והדיין, "The Law and Its Decisor"), a journal issued three times a year on halakhic and legal questions relating to women in the rabbinical court system. It also holds an annual conference on Jewish law and women's status.

=== Domestic violence legislation ===
The Center began pushing for electronic monitoring of domestic abusers in 2015. In 2020 it drafted a bill on the subject, which then-MK Keren Barak brought to the Knesset. The legislation spent years in limbo, including a period in which then-National Security Minister Itamar Ben Gvir pushed through changes he framed as adding "balance." The Knesset eventually passed the law in July 2023, and an amendment enabling courts to order electronic bracelets under protection orders took effect in August 2024.

The Center has also pushed for a statutory definition of domestic violence broad enough to cover emotional, economic, verbal, and coercive abuse, not just physical harm, and has called on Israel to ratify the Istanbul Convention on violence against women.

== Expansion into religious institutional reform ==
From roughly the mid-2010s onward the Center moved beyond family law litigation and halakhic advocacy into direct challenges to the structure of Israeli religious institutions, using civil and constitutional law. This brought it into open conflict with the Orthodox establishment.

=== Women in the Chief Rabbinate Electoral Assembly ===
In 2018 the Center joined the religious-Zionist group Ne'emanei Torah Va'Avodah in petitioning the Israeli Supreme Court over the composition of the Chief Rabbinate's Electoral Assembly, the 150-member body that elects the Chief Rabbis of Israel. Under a 1980 law, 80 of those seats were reserved for "rabbis," a category that had always been interpreted to mean men. The Center argued that since many men in those seats held private or communal ordination rather than formal Chief Rabbinate ordination, there was no consistent basis for excluding women with comparable knowledge.

In January 2024 the High Court ruled for the Center, holding that excluding women from the "rabbi" seats constituted illegal gender discrimination. Both outgoing Chief Rabbis opposed the ruling, as did the major ultra-Orthodox parties. Critics in the Orthodox world argued that a secular court had no business imposing anti-discrimination law on a religious institution. The Court itself noted that the Rabbinate was unlikely to actually appoint women to those positions anytime soon.

=== Rabbinical certification exams ===
In July 2025 the High Court ruled unanimously, on a petition from the Rackman Center along with ITIM and Kolech: Religious Women's Forum, that the Chief Rabbinate must open its rabbinical certification exams to women on equal terms with men. The Court found that barring women from the exams was prohibited discrimination. It noted that the exams test halakhic knowledge rather than conferring rabbinic status, and that the state uses the resulting certificates as a condition of employment and pay in certain roles. In February 2026 the Chief Rabbinate announced that registration for all ordination exams, covering Shabbat, kashrut, family purity law, and marriage, would be open to men and women alike.

=== Opposition to expanded rabbinical court jurisdiction ===
Since 2023 the Center has also fought Knesset bills that would expand rabbinical court jurisdiction, arguing that giving the rabbinical courts broader authority puts more women into a legal system where they are structurally disadvantaged. This puts the Center in the position of opposing rabbinical court power rather than trying to reform it from within, a notable departure from where it started.

== Reception and tensions ==
The Center's move from agunah advocacy into broader institutional reform has not gone unremarked in observant Jewish communities. Its founding mandate was explicitly framed around Rabbi Rackman's vision of advancing women's rights within Jewish law. Supporters say that using Israel's civil legal system was forced on the Center by the rabbinical establishment's unwillingness to reform itself, and point out that many of the barriers it challenges, such as the exclusion of women from Chief Rabbinate bodies, rest on institutional custom rather than explicit Torah prohibition.

=== The get coercion problem ===
A harder halakhic objection concerns the Center's core agunah work. Jewish law requires that a get be given freely by the husband. A get obtained through improper coercion is a get meusah, a coerced get, and may be invalid under halakha. If invalid, the marriage is not dissolved, and any subsequent remarriage could carry severe religious consequences. This is not a question of rabbinic custom. It goes to Torah-level obligations around marriage and divorce.

The concern is that civil court pressure, precisely what the Center's legislative advocacy is designed to create, may be the kind of coercion that makes a get invalid. Rabbi Hershel Schachter, one of the most widely cited Orthodox halakhic authorities in America, argued in a well-known essay that the kiddushei ta'ut framework Rabbi Rackman championed set too low a threshold for annulment. He noted that the Talmud itself calls for a get even in cases that would seem to qualify for annulment on ta'ut grounds. A range of Orthodox organizations took a similar position when Rabbi Rackman's private beit din was operating in the 1990s, condemning its approach even while acknowledging the problem it was trying to solve.

The underlying tension, between getting women out of bad marriages and ensuring the get is halakhically valid when they do, has not been resolved in Orthodox jurisprudence. Opinions differ on how much communal or civil pressure crosses the line into invalidating coercion.

=== Institutional reform and religious self-governance ===
The Chief Rabbinate petitions have drawn a different kind of criticism: that Israeli civil courts are applying secular anti-discrimination law to a religious institution in ways that override its own understanding of its halakhic mandate. After the 2024 Electoral Assembly ruling the outgoing Chief Rabbis obtained a formal ruling from the Chief Rabbinate Council declaring that appointing women to seats designated for rabbis was halakhically forbidden.

The Center says it pursues a two-track approach, pushing back hard where it believes government policy harms women and looking for common ground where it can find it.

== See also ==
- Agunah
- Emanuel Rackman
- Ruth Halperin-Kaddari
- Chief Rabbinate of Israel
- Get (divorce document)
- Committee on the Elimination of Discrimination Against Women
