= List of Netanya neighborhoods =

Neighbourhoods in Netanya

This is a list of neighborhoods in the Israeli city of Netanya.

- Ben Zion
- Ein Hatchelet
- Galy Hayam
- Gan Bracha
- Givat Hairusim
- Ir Yamim
- Kiryat Eliezer
- Kiryat Hasharon
- Kiryat Nordau
- Kiryat Oved
- Kiryat Sanz
- Kiryat Sapir
- Kiryat Rabin (Amalia)
- Mahane Ya’akov
- Mishkenot Zevulun
- Neot Begin
- Neot Ganim (Shikun Vatikim)
- Neot Golda
- Neot Herzl
- Neot Shaked (Azorim)
- Neve Itamar
- Neve Oz
- Nof Hatayelet (NT/600 North)
- Pardes Hagdud
- Ramat Efraim
- Ramat Hen
- Ramat Poleg
- Ramat Yadin (Dora)
- Sela
- Tubruk
- Umm Khalid (ruined)
