= Hapoel Netanya =

Hapoel Netanya
Founded	1980s
Full Name	Hapoel Netanya
Arena	Naomi Shemer hall
Club Colours	Black & White
president	Uri Rafael
manager	Uri Rafael
owner	Voluntary association
league	Liga Artzit
season	2015-16
position	7

Hapoel Netanya is a handball team from the city of Netanya, Israel. The team's colors are black and white, and it hosts its home games in Ben Gurion hall in the north side of the city.

The team was founded in the early 1980s and was a regular member of the first division until the late 1990s when the team collapsed.

In 2005 former player Uri Rafael decided to revive the team, and in the 2007-08 season the team won the third division and are now playing the second division in hope to return to the top division.

== Titles ==
- 3rd Division Champions:
  - 2007-08
