= Avi Alfasi =

Israeli footballer

Avi Alfasi אבי אלפסי
Personal information
- Full name: Avi Alfasi
- Date of birth: December 18, 1980 (age 45)
- Place of birth: Netanya, Israel

Youth career
- Maccabi Netanya

Senior career*
Years	Team	Apps	(Gls)
2000–2005	Maccabi Netanya	51	(2)
2000–2001	→ Ironi Ramat HaSharon (loan)		
2005–2006	Hapoel Kfar Saba	3	(0)
2006–2007	Ironi Ramat HaSharon	29	(1)
2007–2010	Hapoel Acre	55	(1)
2010–2012	Maccabi Umm al-Fahm	43	(2)
2012–2013	Maccabi Kfar Yona	23	(0)
2013–2014	Hapoel Morasha Ramat HaSharon	13	(0)
- * Club domestic league appearances and goals

Avi Alfasi (Hebrew: אבי אלפסי; born December 18, 1980) is a former Israeli footballer.

== Honours ==
- Toto Cup (Leumit) (1):
  - 2004-05
- Liga Alef (1):
  - 2010-11
- Liga Leumit:
  - Runner-up (2): 2004–05, 2008–09
