= Amos Neheysi =

Israeli footballer

Amos Neheysi עמוס נהייסי
Personal information
- Full name: Amos Neheysi
- Date of birth: December 6, 1979 (age 46)
- Place of birth: Netanya, Israel

Youth career
- Maccabi Netanya

Senior career*
Years	Team	Apps	(Gls)
1998–2004	Maccabi Netanya	102	(0)
2004–2006	Hakoah Amidar Ramat Gan		
2006–2007	Maccabi Kafr Kanna	16	(1)

International career
2000–2001	Israel U-21	6	(0)
- * Club domestic league appearances and goals

Amos Neheysi (Hebrew: עמוס נהייסי) is a former Israeli footballer.
