= Kiryat Nordau, Netanya =

Kiryat Nordau קריית נורדאו
- Neighborhood
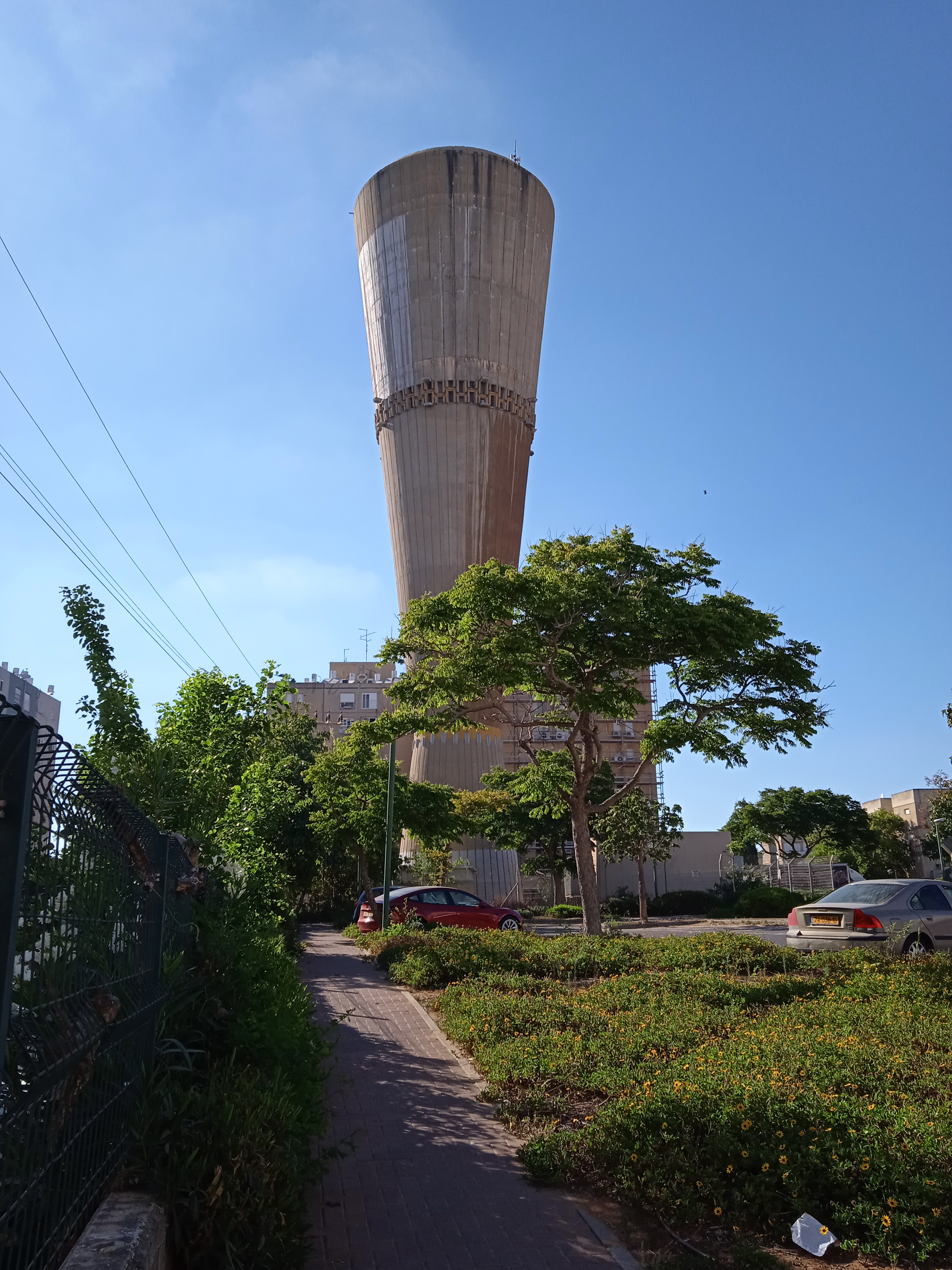
- The Kiryat Nordau water tower
- Interactive map of Kiryat Nordau
- Location within Israel
- Coordinates: 32.28405°N 34.85267°E
- Established: April 1957

Government
  - Southern District Manager: Claudine Maimoni (קלודין מימוני)

Kiryat Nordau (Hebrew: קריית נורדאו) is a residential neighborhood named after Max Nordau in southern Netanya.

The neighborhood is located northeast of the Ir Yamim and Ramat Poleg neighborhoods. It is also adjacent to a smaller, newer neighborhood called Giv'at Ha'Irusim.

== History ==
In the summer of 1919, the Zionist General Council, headed by Chaim Weizmann and Nahum Sokolow, decided to establish a garden city in Israel named after Max Nordau. The Jewish National Fund (JNF) began collecting funds to realize this goal, but following various upheavals in the JNF's management, implementation of the decision was postponed. In early 1924, Menachem Ussishkin published an advertisement calling for donations to finance the establishment of the city, as only 22,000 £P had been collected out of the 50,000 required for the project. In 1947, architect Alexander Klein began planning a garden city in the Wadi Falik area on an area of 6,000 dunams for 40,000-50,000 people. At the end of 1949, Maxa Nordau visited the site, in preparation for the establishment of the garden city. However, the planning department opposed the plan. A committee of the Ministry of the Interior decided, despite the opposition of the JNF, to annex the area to Netanya, claiming that there was no room for two separate and neighboring cities. The Netanya Municipality invested in the development of the area and the plan for the camp was included in the Netanya city building plan, but the construction of the camp was delayed due to IDF firing ranges in the area.

In April 1957, construction of the neighborhood began by the "Housing for Immigrants" company, which erected 400 shacks on the site. In 1958, the Netanya Municipality connected the neighborhood to the electricity grid. In 1962, the neighborhood began to be expanded with approximately 600 housing units. Alongside them, the Netanya South industrial zone was established east of the coastal road.

In the early 1970s, the Kiryat Nordau Development Company, headed by Naftali Rabin and owned by Shikun and Pituh, Solel Boneh and Shikun Ovdim, worked to build 10,000 housing units in the neighborhood. For this purpose, it was decided to build the Poleg Interchange with joint funding from the company, the Netanya Municipality and Ma'atz.

== Education ==
The neighborhood is home to the Tzlil Elementary School, the Orot Rashi School, the Eldad School, and Ort Gutman Middle and High Schools.

Several youth clubs are active in the neighborhood including: the local branch of the HaNoar HaOved VeHaLomed, "Café L'Noar," from which the band Strong Black Coffee emerged, a branch of the Bnei Akiva movement that is active in Dati Leumi schools, and a branch of the Ariel movement.

The neighborhood also has a community center and the Bar Yehuda Youth Club.

== Culture ==
In the 1970s, the members of the band Gan Eden lived in a shack in the neighborhood. Director Uri Barbash documented them in his film "Gan Eden" (1977).

The members of the band Strong Black Coffee grew up in the neighborhood, and it influenced the music they create.
