= Gabi Packer =

Israeli footballer

Gabi Packer גבי פקר
Personal information
- Full name: Gabi Packer
- Date of birth: 3 May 1969
- Place of birth: Netanya, Israel
- Position: Left back

Youth career
- Maccabi Netanya

Senior career*
Years	Team	Apps	(Gls)
1987–1994	Maccabi Netanya	236	(14)
1994–1995	Maccabi Petah Tikva	21	(3)
1995–1996	Maccabi Netanya		
1996–1997	Maccabi Ironi Ashdod	17	(0)
1997–1998	Hapoel Tzafririm Holon		
1998–1999	Maccabi Netanya		
- * Club domestic league appearances and goals

Gabi Packer (Hebrew: גבי פקר) is a former Israeli footballer who is mostly known for playing in Maccabi Netanya for 14 seasons.

== Honours ==
- Championships
  - Runner-up (1): 1987–88
- Toto Cup
  - Runner-up (2): 1986–87, 1988–89
- Second Division
  - Winner (1): 1998–99
  - Runner-up (1): 1996-97
