= Kiryat Hasharon, Netanya =

Kiryat Hasharon קריית השרון
- Neighborhood
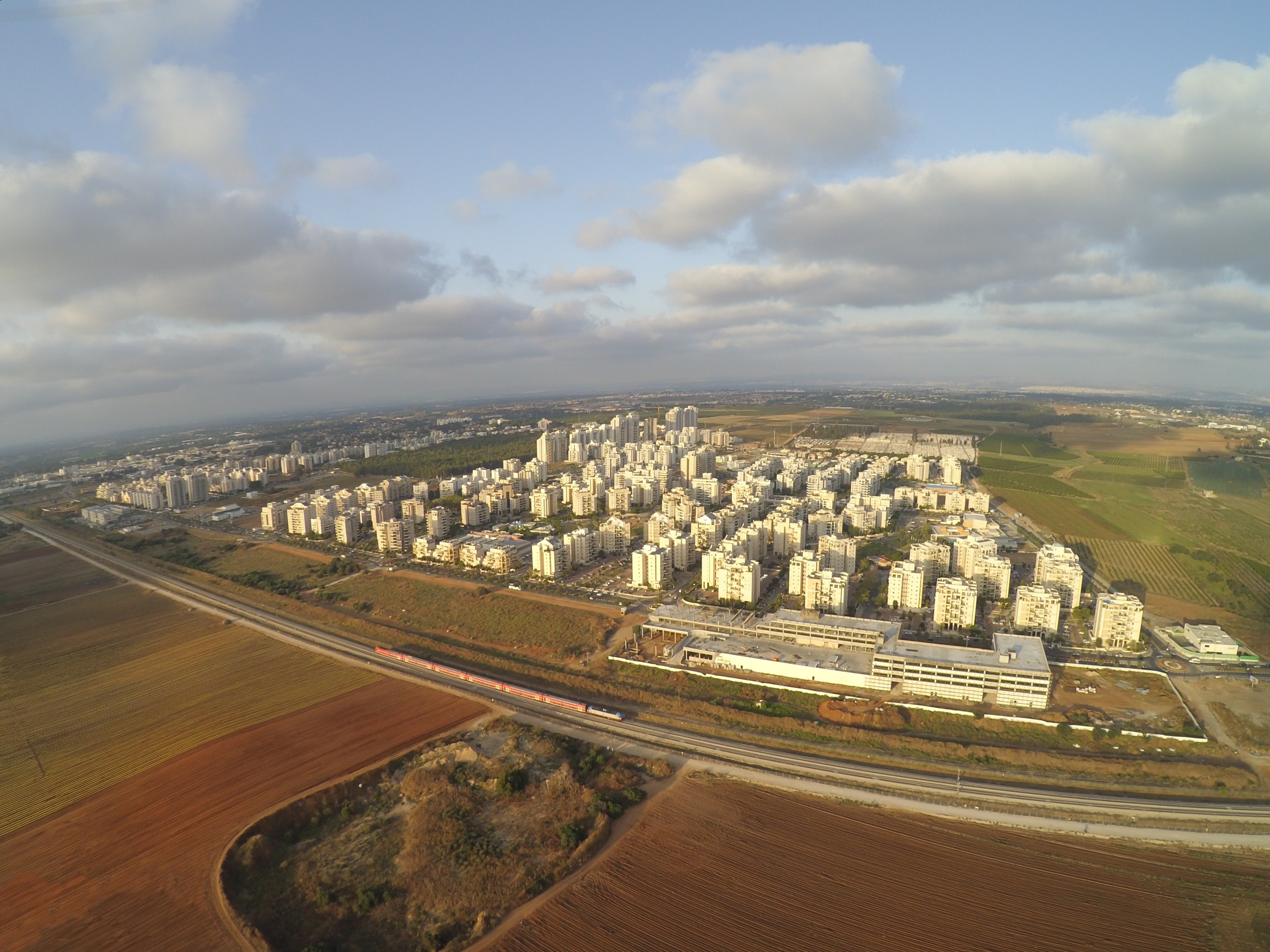
- Interactive map of Kiryat Hasharon
- Location within Israel
- Coordinates: 32.3044180°N 34.8732309°E
- Established: 2006

Kiryat Hasharon (Hebrew: קריית השרון) is a residential neighborhood in Netanya. It is bordered on the northeast by the Sargent's Grove and Mishkenot Zevulun and on the west by Highway 2.

== History ==
Netanya officially opened Kiryat Hasharon in 1997–1999 as the city released eastern land for development. In the early 2000s, the cost of living and proximity to the coastal road encouraged people to move to the neighborhood. As of 2015, Kiryat Hasharon is the second largest neighborhood in Netanya by number of people.

== Housing ==
Kiryat Hasharon has a generally dense housing layout. Buildings average 8-10 stories but there are a few buildings that reach 20 stories. As of 2015, the average 3 bedroom in the neighborhood cost 1.3 million NIS, 4 bedrooms average 1.7 million NIS, and 5 bedroom average 2 million NIS. Rental costs for a 3 bedroom average 4000 NIS per month, 4 bedrooms average 5000 NIS per month, and 5 bedrooms average 6000 NIS per month. Private houses cost on average 8000 NIS per month to rent.

== Demographic ==
The neighborhood has about 16,000 residents. The age distribution in the neighborhood indicates a high percentage of the population in their 30s and children in kindergarten and elementary school. The economic index in the neighborhood is medium-high, about 7 out of 10, and the population is generally young couples with 1-3 children.

The neighborhood has a growing Anglo modern orthodox community, upwards of 70 families as of 2025.
