= Ir Yamim, Netanya =

Ir Yamim עיר ימים
- Neighborhood
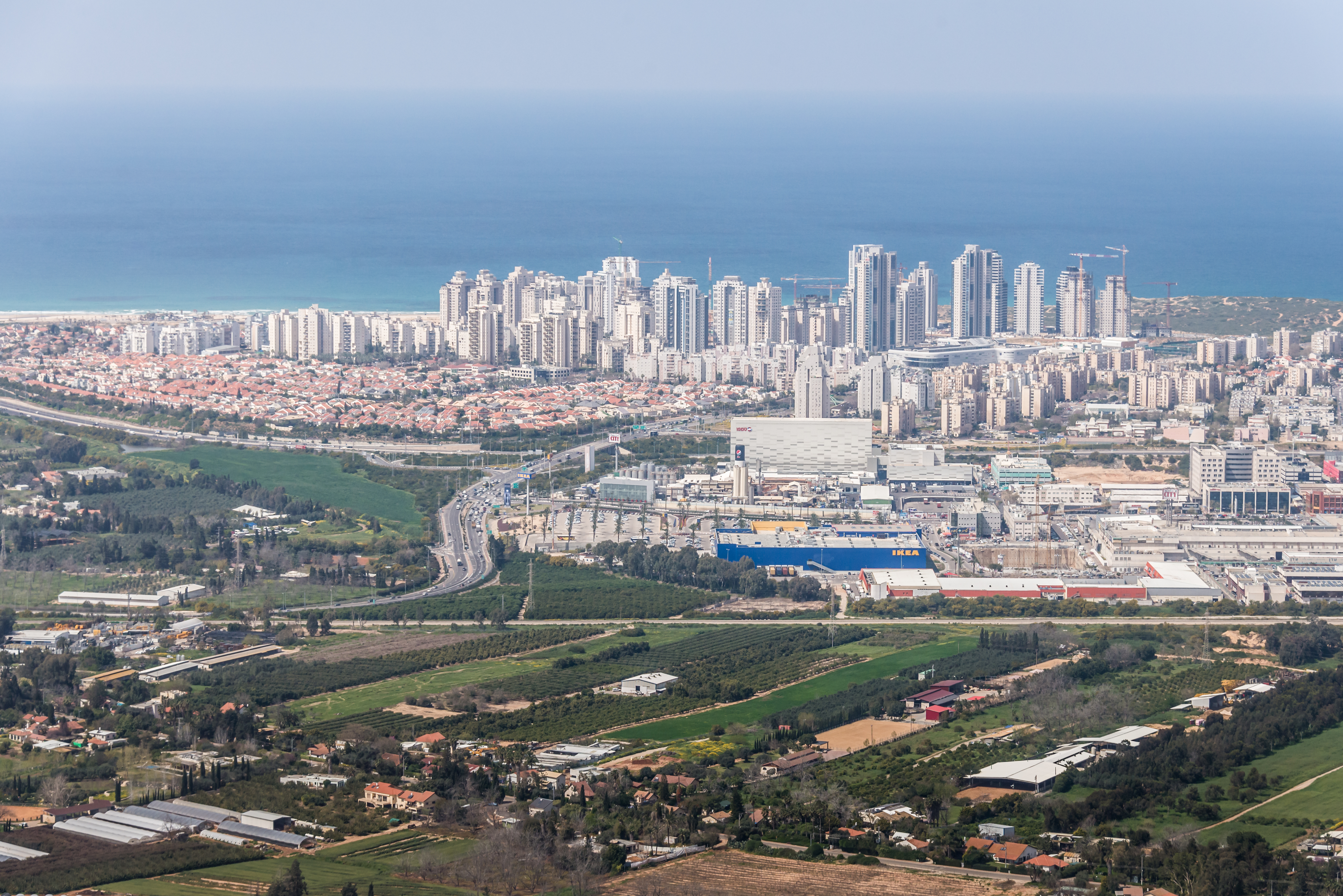
- Interactive map of Ir Yamim
- Location within Israel
- Coordinates: 32.278182°N 34.842484°E
- Established: 2006

Ir Yamim is a residential neighborhood in southwestern Netanya, spanning 1,140 dunams along the Netanya beach, between Givat Ha'Irosim to the north, Kiryat Nordau to the east, and Ramat Poleg to the south.

== History ==
Ir Yamim was established in 2006. A decade later, most of the residential buildings in the neighborhood were built, although the construction boom in the neighborhood continues to this day. The neighborhood has built 4,510 housing units, 3,150 hotel rooms, and approximately 34,000 square meters of commercial space.

Ir Yamim, characterized by its many high-rise buildings and luxury towers, is considered the most prestigious neighborhood in Netanya and the most sought-after in the Sharon region. The street names and statues located in the neighborhood are named after and dedicated to various poets and musicians.

In 2011, the Ir Yamim Mall was built and became the largest mall in Netanya and one of the largest in Israel. In 2018, extension renovations allowed dozens of new stores to open. In the center of the neighborhood is a plaza named "the Piano", which an outdoor entertainment and commercial center that opened in March 2020. The complex provides restaurants, shopping and outdoor seating.

== Urban Planning ==
When planning the neighborhood, emphasis was placed on incorporating green spaces to improve quality of living. In the center of the neighborhood is a large park, with underground paths for pedestrians and cyclists, alongside commercial and entertainment centers. The neighborhood also has state educational institutions and public parks, and there is a direct walking connection to Poleg Beach.

Many people have positively criticized the neighborhood's urban planning, given its proximity to places of entertainment, leisure, and employment. On the other hand, some argue that the architecture of the buildings is banal and that the neighborhood was designed as a "kind of fortress" from the rest of the city.

In addition, there is widespread controversy regarding the construction of hotels along Poleg Beach, the adjacent neighborhood. Residents of Ir Yamim who oppose the move claim that the construction of the hotels will harm the standard of living in their neighborhood and that as a result, the nature plots next to the Iris Reserve will be completely destroyed.

== Transportation ==
The neighborhood is a short drive from the Poleg Interchange and the coastal road, which allows for quick exit from the city towards the north and south of the country, as well as to the Tel Aviv metropolitan area.

Public transportation in the neighborhood is not developed compared to other neighborhoods in the city. There is, however, a regular network of bus lines to the rest of the city, a direct bus line to Tel Aviv, and bus lines that connect Ir Yamim to the Beit Yehoshua train station, where Israel Railways trains reach many areas of the country.
