= Netanya =

Netanya נְתַנְיָה (Hebrew)
- City

Hebrew transcription(s)
  - ISO 259: Netanya
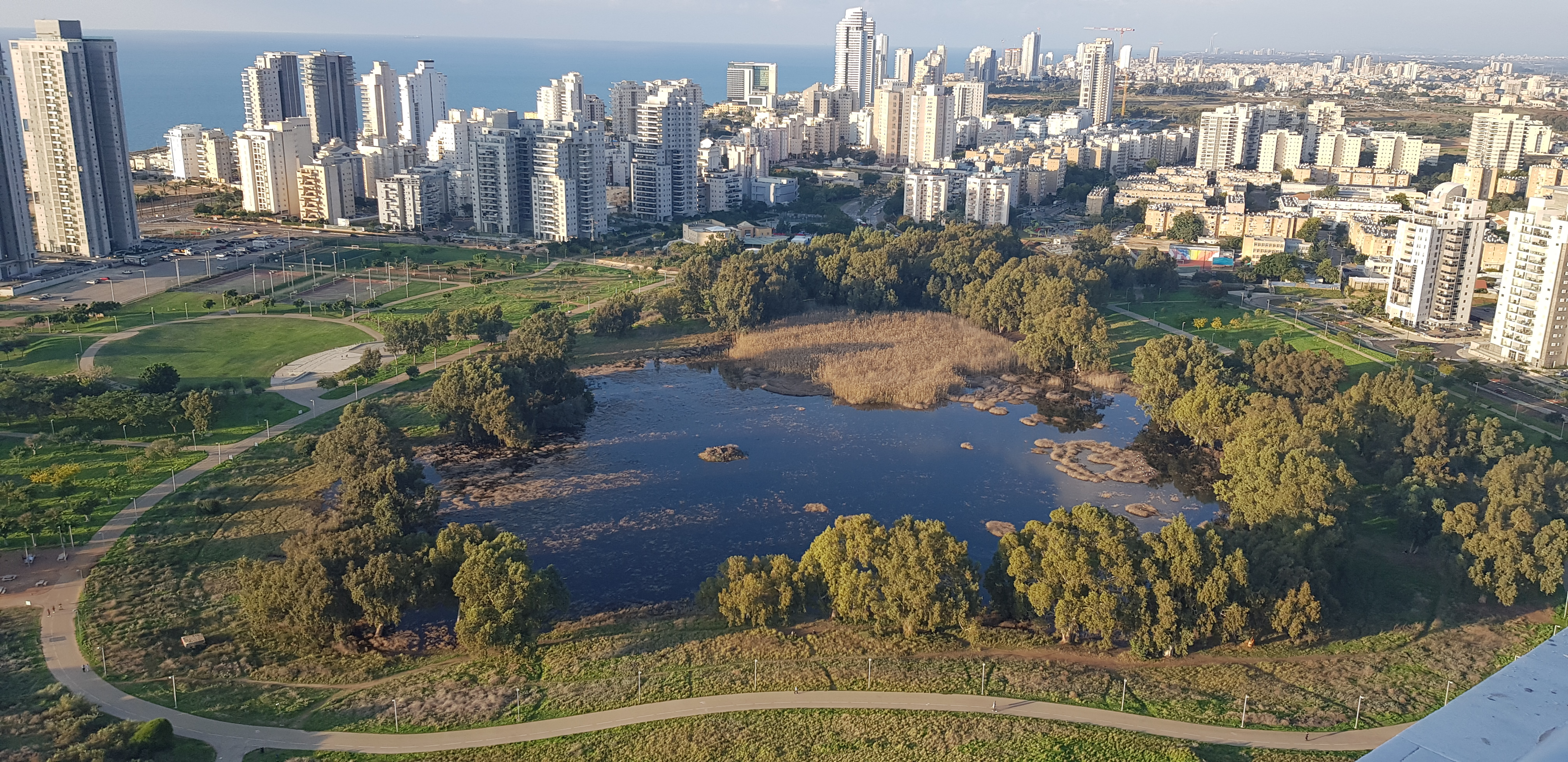
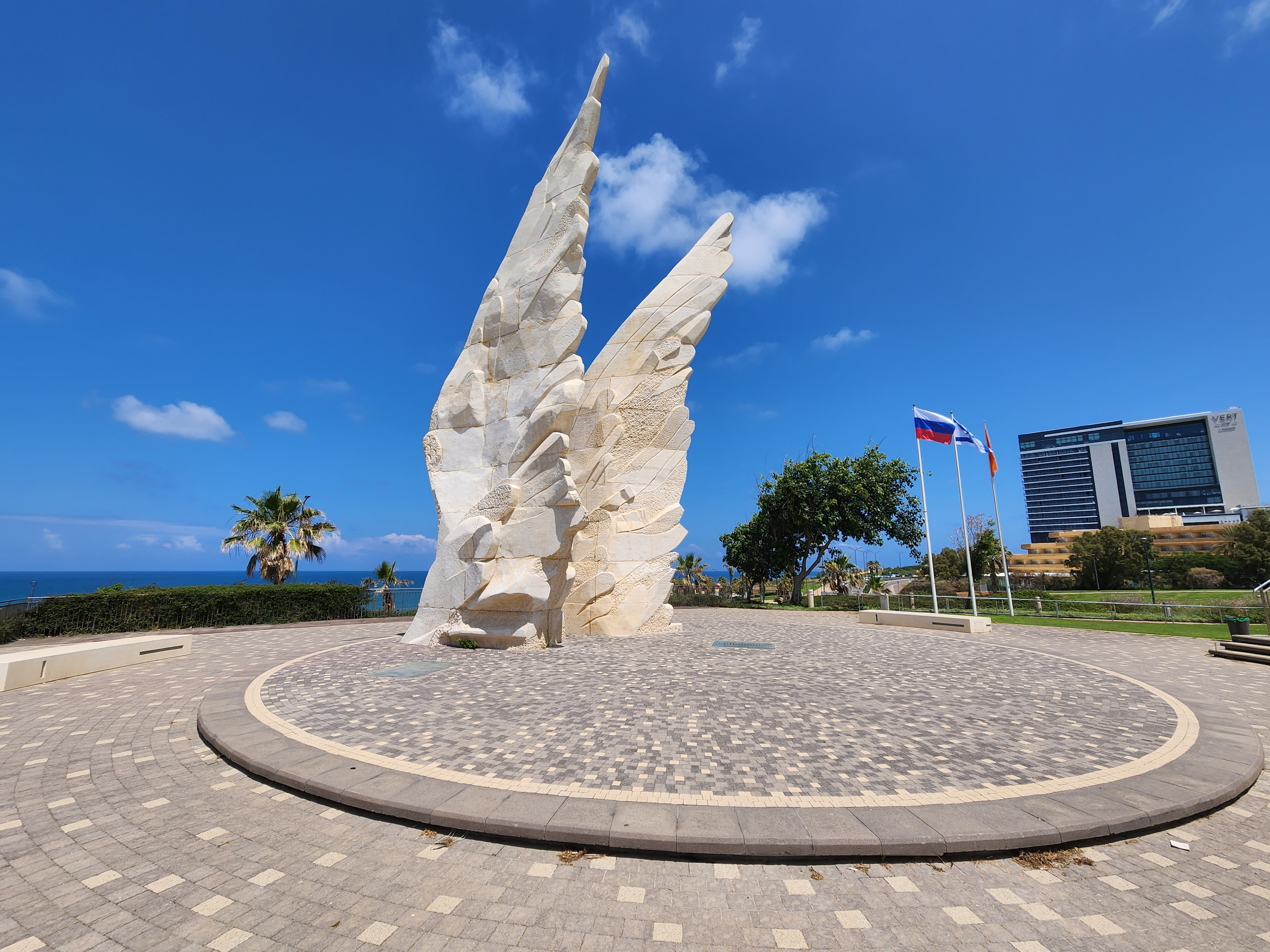
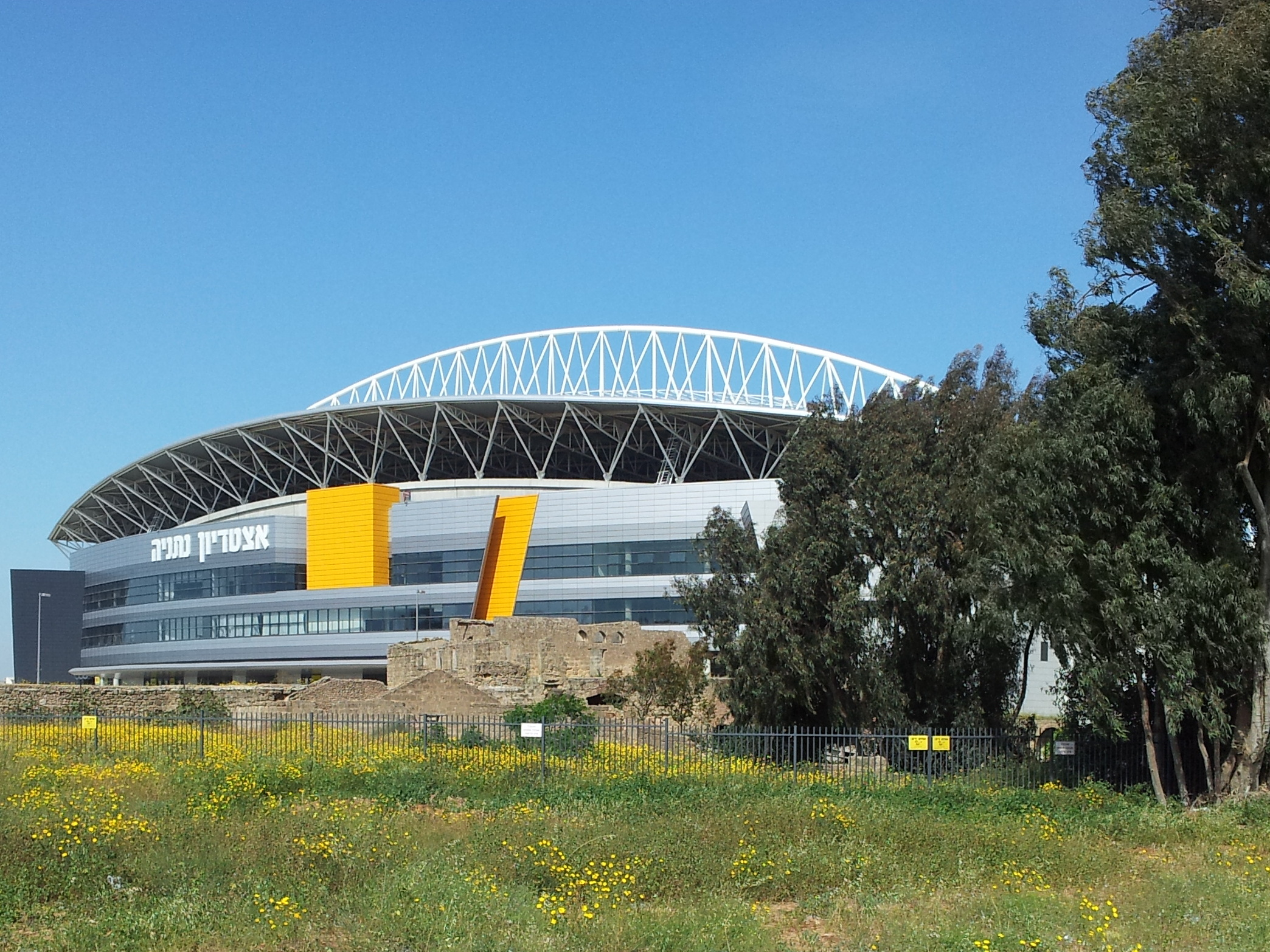
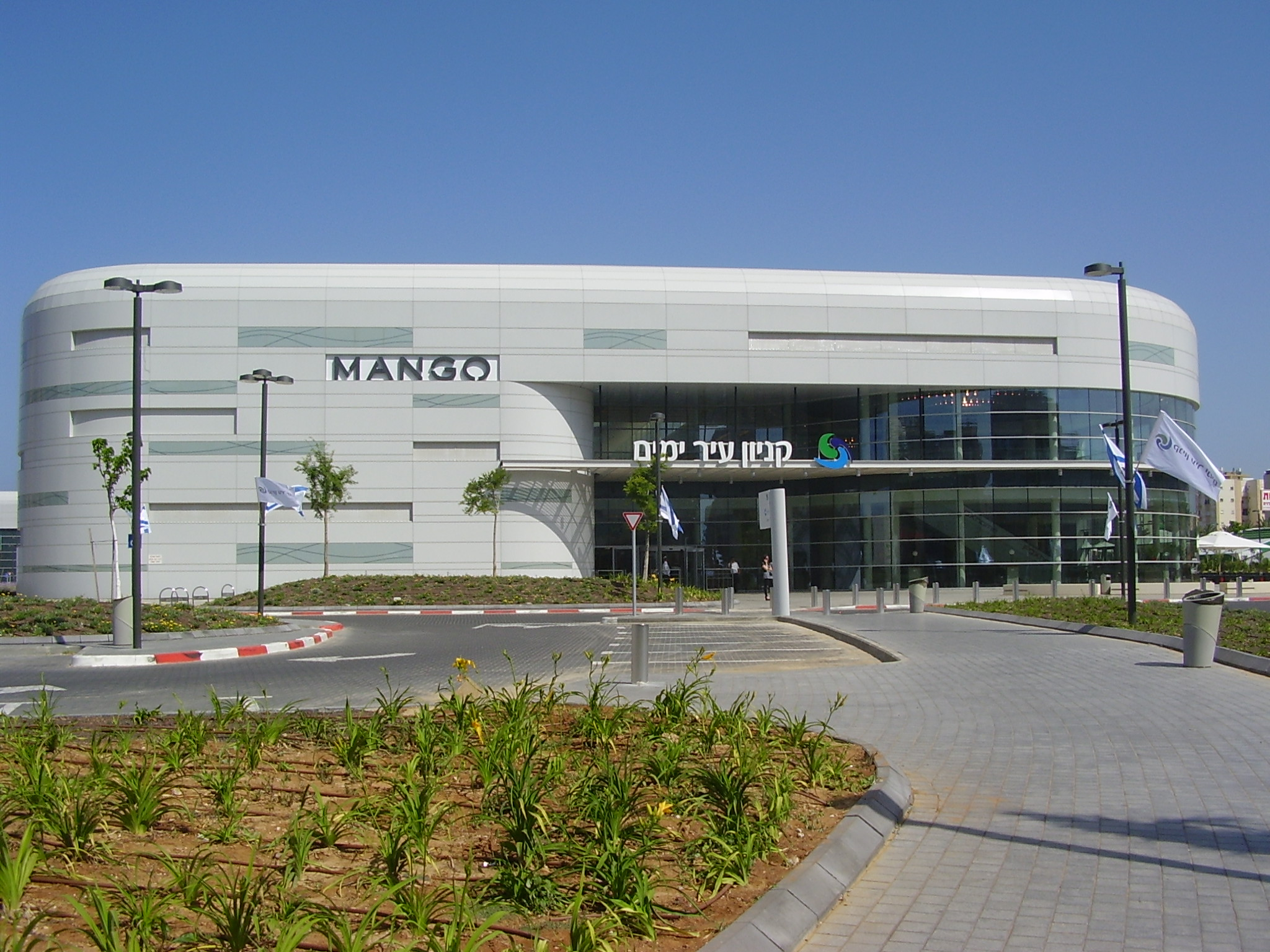
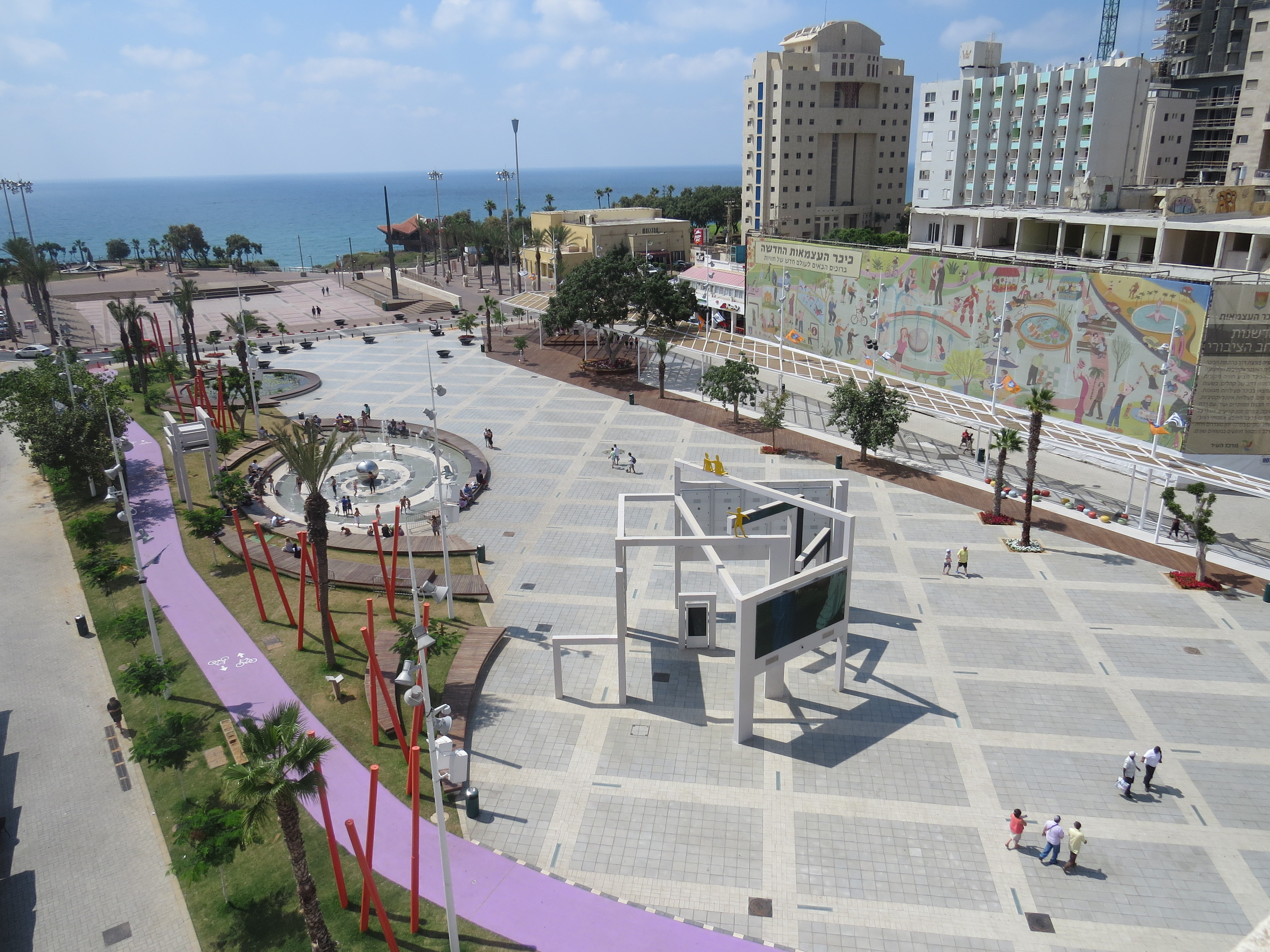
- Netanya skyline Victory Monument Netanya Stadium Ir Yamim Mall Independence Square

- Flag Coat of arms

- Location within Israel Netanya (Israel)
- Coordinates: 32°19′43″N 34°51′24″E
- Country: Israel
- District: Central
- Subdistrict: HaSharon
- Natural Region: Western Sharon
- Founded: 18 February 1929

Government
  - Type: Mayor–council
  - Body: Municipality of Netanya
  - Mayor: Avi Slama

Area
  - Total: 34,750 dunams (34.75 km^{2}; 13.42 sq mi)

Population (2024)
  - Total: 234,813
  - Density: 6,757/km^{2} (17,500/sq mi)

Ethnicity
  - Jews: 88.0%
  - Arabs: 0.3%
  - Others: 11.7%
- Time zone: UTC+2 (IST)
  - Summer (DST): UTC+3 (IDT)
- Name meaning: Named after Nathan Straus
- Website: www.netanya.muni.il

Netanya (Hebrew: נְתַנְיָה, IPA: [netanˈja]), or Natanya (IPA: [naˈtanja]), is a city in the Central District of Israel, and is the capital of the surrounding Sharon plain. It is 30 kilometres (20 mi) north of Tel Aviv, and 56 km (35 mi) south of Haifa, between the Poleg stream and the Wingate Institute in the south and the Avihayil stream in the north. The 14 km (8 1/2 mi) of beaches have made the city a popular tourist resort.

Founded in 1929 by deed of a coastal land purchase in the Arab village of Umm Khalid, Netanya was named in honor of Nathan Straus, a prominent Jewish American merchant and philanthropist in the early 20th century, who was the co-owner of the Macy's department store chain. In 1948, the remaining land of Umm Khalid was deserted by its inhabitants during the Arab-Israeli 1948 war, after which Netanya started further expanding eastwards.

In the 1990s, the city absorbed a large amount of immigrants from the former Soviet Union as well as from Ethiopia. As a result, 1 out of 4 inhabitants speaks Russian and the city's Ethiopian community is the largest in Israel, numbering over 12,000 citizens.

In 2024, Netanya had a population of 234,813, ranking it as the 7th-largest city in Israel by population. An additional 150,000 people live in the local and regional councils within ten kilometres (six miles) of Netanya, which serves as a regional center for them.

== History ==
Before the 20th century, parts of Netanya belonged to the Forest of Sharon, a hallmark of the region's historical landscape. It was an open woodland dominated by Mount Tabor Oak (Quercus ithaburensis), which extended from Kfar Yona in the north to Ra'anana in the south. Arabs who lived in the area used it for pasture, firewood and intermittent cultivation. The intensification of settlement and agriculture in the coastal plain during the 19th century led to deforestation and subsequent environmental degradation known from Hebrew sources.

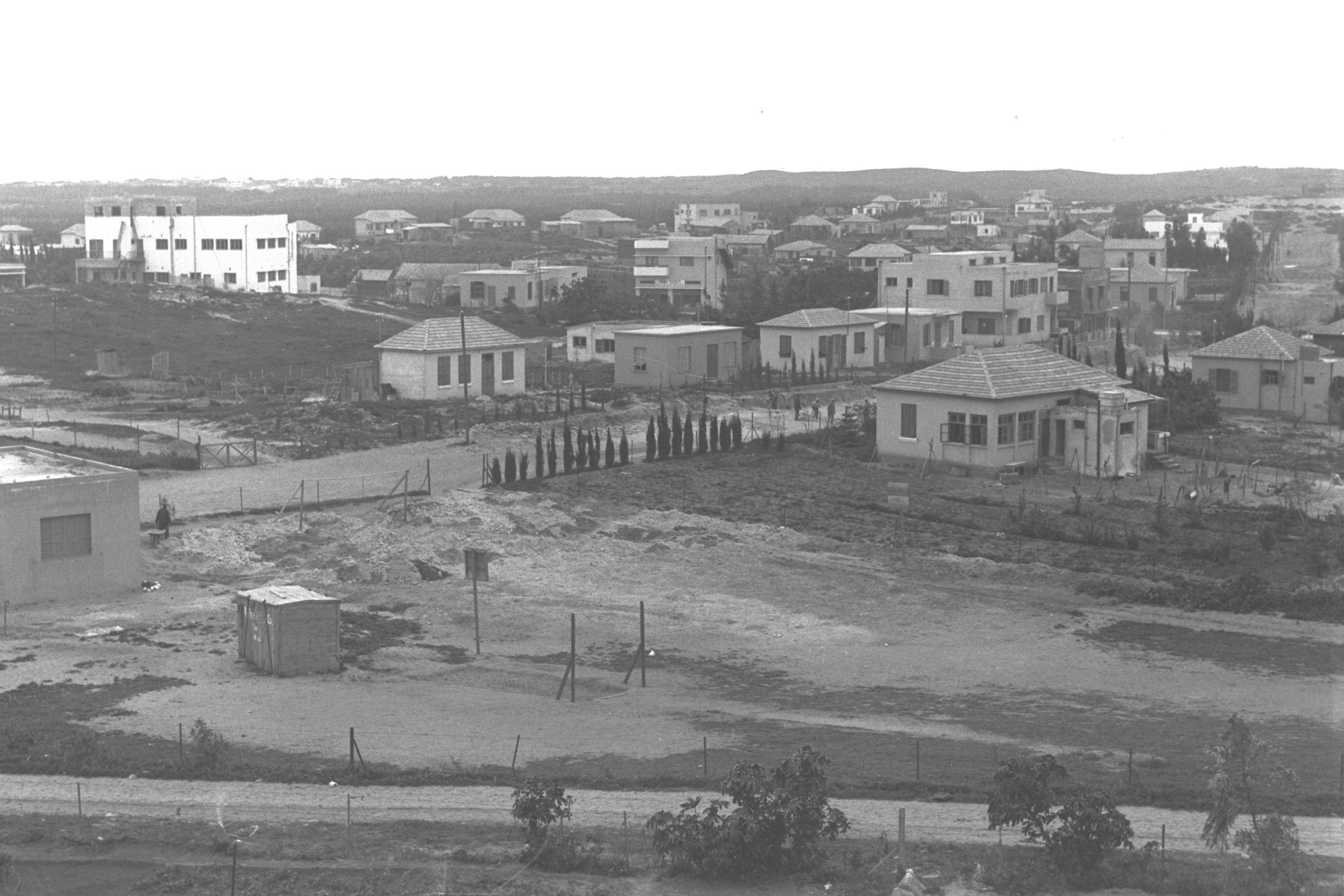
Netanya in 1936

Netanya was established near the ancient site of Poleg by the Bnei Binyamin association in Zikhron Ya'akov. It was named in honor of Nathan (Hebrew: Natan) Straus (1848–1931), co-owner of Macy's department store, New York City Parks Commissioner, and president of the New York City Board of Health, who gifted two-thirds of his personal fortune to projects benefiting Jews and Arabs in Mandatory Palestine. "Netanya...was named for Straus in the hope he would donate money to them. When he told them he had no more money to give, they were disappointed, but decided to keep the city's name anyway."

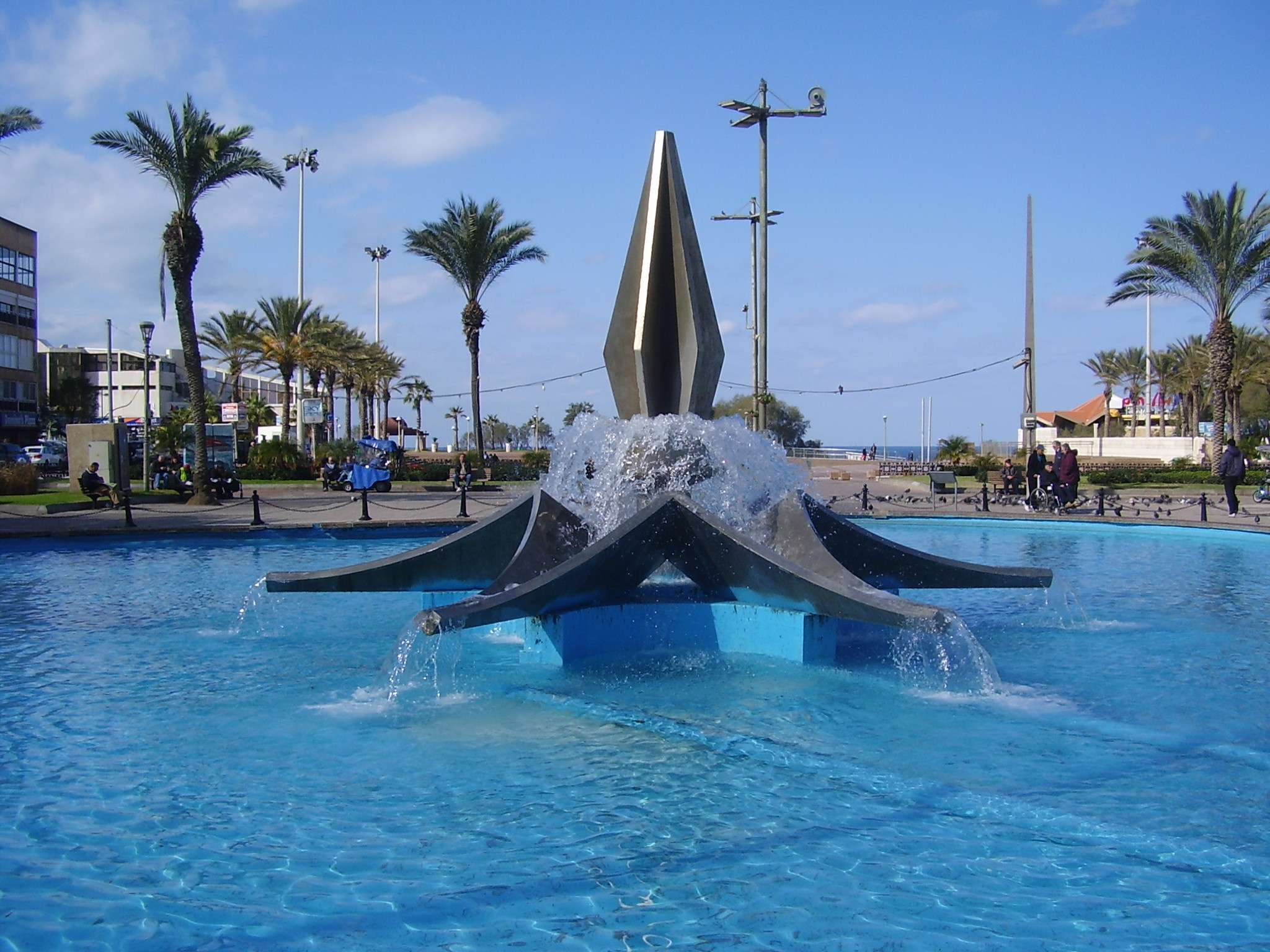
The fountain in the Independence Square. In 2012 it was moved to the west and an interactive electronic fountain was erected in its place

The funds for the project of building Netanya were raised by Itamar Ben-Avi and Oved Ben-Ami, who embarked on a fundraising trip to the United States to raise the money. In 1928 members of Bnei Binyamin and Hanotea, an organisation set up after Straus was informed of the establishment of the settlement, purchased 140 hectares (350 acres) of Umm Khaled lands. On 14 December 1928, a team led by Moshe Shaked began digging for water at the site. After water was discovered in February 1929, the first five settlers moved onto the land. In the weeks that followed, more settlers began arriving. Development was set back due to the 1929 Palestine riots and massacre of Jews. By September, however, development was back on track with the cornerstones for the first 10 houses being laid on Sukkot.

The first kindergarten opened in 1930 and the first school in 1931. In the 1931 census of Palestine, Netanya was recorded as having 253 residents. In 1933, the British architect Clifford Holliday drew up a plan for Netanya as a tourist resort. Holliday also designed urban projects in Jaffa, Tiberias, Lydda and Ramla. The first urban plan divided the city into three sections with a tourism district along the coastline, housing, farms and commerce in the center, and agriculture and industry to the east. That year also saw the completion of the Tel Aviv Hotel, the first hotel in Netanya, as well as the establishment of two new neighborhoods, Ben Zion and Geva.

In 1934, the first Aliyah Bet ship arrived at the shores of Netanya, carrying 350 immigrants. By 1939, over seventeen more ships had followed. An industrial zone was established, and the first synagogue and school was built.

In 1937 the cornerstone was laid for a new commercial center and the connection of Netanya to the Tel Aviv-Haifa road. In 1939, the Ophir diamond polishing plant, the first diamond polishing plant in Palestine, was opened by Asher Daskall and Zvi Rosenberg. In 1940, the British Mandate government defined Netanya as a local council of which Oved Ben-Ami was elected head. In 1944, Netanya had a population of 4,900. The first high school in Netanya opened in 1945.

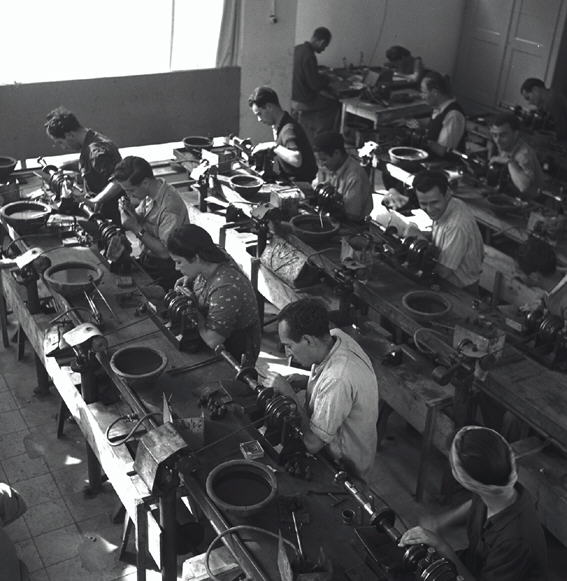
Netanya Diamond polishing factory in 1945

During the Jewish insurgency in Palestine, the Jewish underground group Irgun launched several attacks against British military and police forces in the Netanya area. The town itself was a bastion of support for the Irgun. The most infamous incident happened in July 1947, in what became known as the Sergeants affair. After three Irgun fighters had been sentenced to death by the British, the Irgun abducted two British sergeants on a Netanya street, and hid them in an abandoned factory. The British responded by declaring martial law and placing Netanya and the surrounding area under curfew. The British Army searched the town and interrogated residents, but did not find the sergeants. After the three Irgun fighters were hanged, the Irgun hanged the two sergeants in the factory and re-hanged and booby-trapped their bodies in an orange grove.

In November 1947, an Egged bus driving from Netanya to Jerusalem was attacked in Petah Tikva. In 1948, following the withdrawal of British forces from Netanya and the 1948 Arab-Israeli War, a large military base was established in the city.

On 3 December 1948, Netanya was declared a city in the newly established State of Israel. Ramat Tiomkin, Ein Hatchlelet, Pardes Hagdud, and Ramat Ephraim were annexed to Netanya. At this time, Netanya had a population of 11,600.

The Kiryat Eliezer Kaplan Industrial Zone was inaugurated in 1949 and Neve Itamar, founded in 1944, was annexed to Netanya. The Netanya railway station opened in 1953.

With Israel experiencing a wave of Jewish immigration from Europe, elsewhere in the Middle East, and North Africa, Netanya's population expanded. In the years following independence, approximately 14,000 Libyan Jewish immigrants settled in Netanya. The population reached 31,000 in 1955. To accommodate the influx of newcomers, the Israeli Housing Ministry built housing units of 50 square meters. The cornerstone of Kiryat Sanz, a religious neighborhood was laid in 1956. The first stock exchange built in Israel was built in Netanya. By 1961, the city's population had grown to 41,300.

During the Six-Day War in 1967, Netanya was hit by Jordanian artillery, and Jordanian planes made sorties near Netanya, but failed to cause major damage. A lone Iraqi bomber attacked Netanya, dropping several bombs which damaged a factory and caused some casualties, shortly before being shot down. In 1972, Netanya had a population of 71,100.

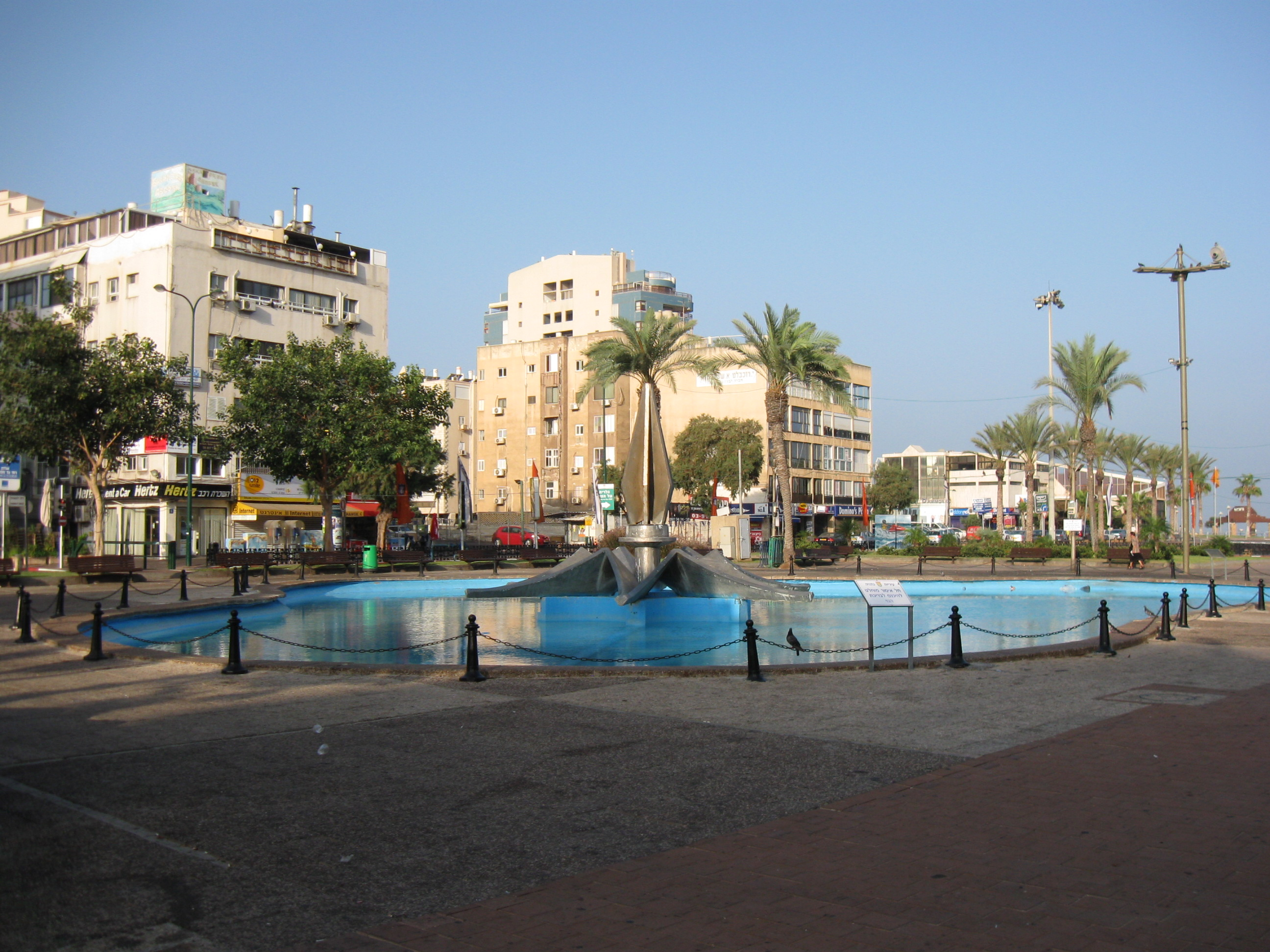
The Lily Fountain in Ha'Atsmaout Square in its first location (2010)

In the 1990s, large numbers of immigrants from the former Soviet Union settled in Netanya, greatly expanding the city's population and resulting in large-scale housing construction.

Netanya suffered from several Palestinian bombings during the Second Intifada, including the Netanya Market bombing and, in the same month, the Passover massacre which caused the death of 29 people. Such attacks were cited as justification for the construction of the Israeli West Bank barrier which has proved effective in stemming suicide attacks.

Miriam Feirberg was elected mayor of Netanya in 1998 and was re-elected five times, most recently in February 2024. In her early years in office she took action against organized crime in the city, closing many illegal businesses. She died in office in November 2025, after 27 years as mayor. In a special election held about two months later, in January 2026, Avi Slama was elected mayor.

In the 2000s and 2010s, Netanya became one of the primary destinations of French Jewish aliyah. Thousands of French immigrants settled in Netanya, influencing the local culture.

== Geography ==
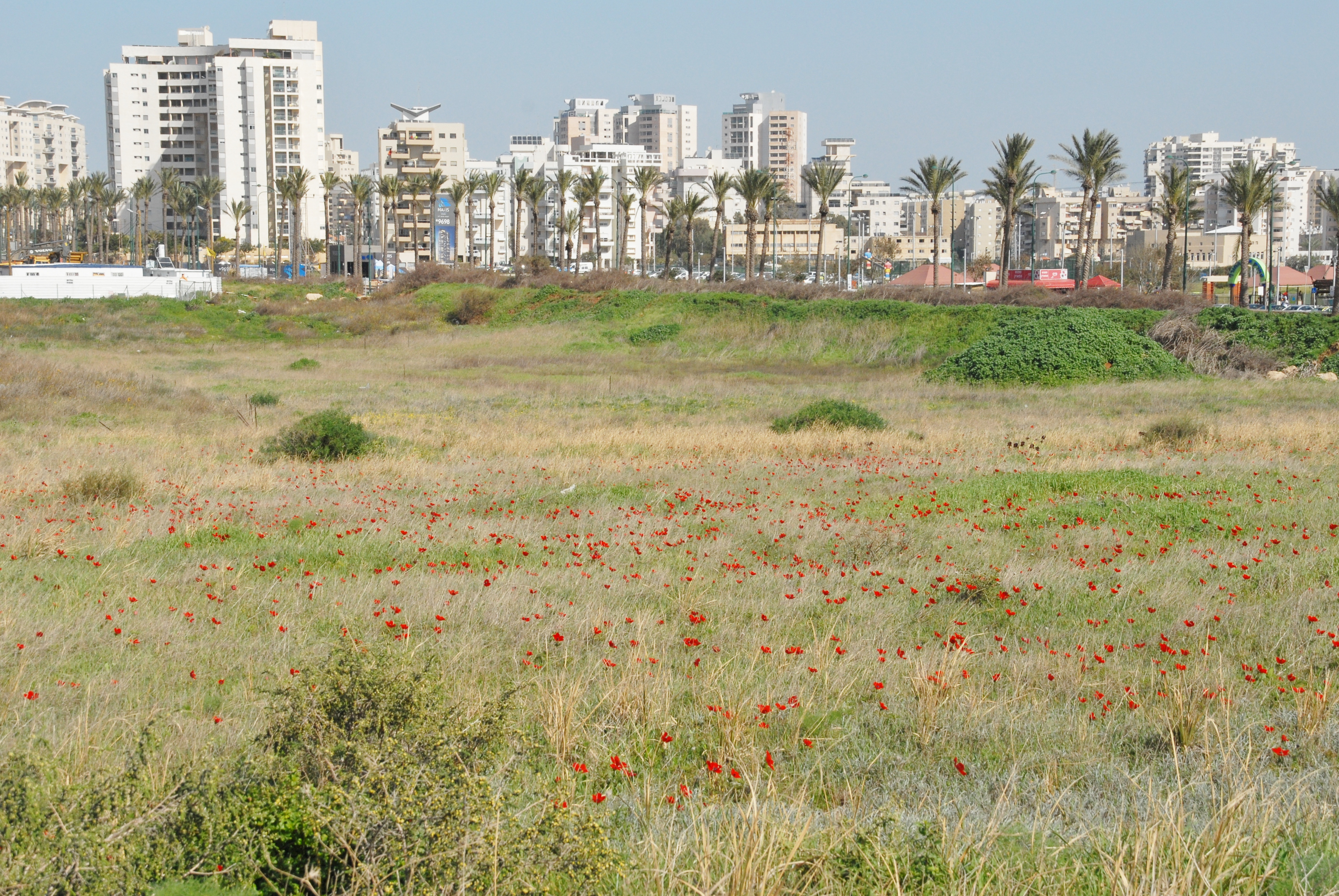
Iris Nature Reserve

Netanya is located on the Israeli Mediterranean Coastal Plain, the historic land bridge between Europe, Africa, and Asia. The city is the capital of the Sharon plain, a geographic region stretching from the Mediterranean in the west to the Samarian hills in the east, and the modern-day Gush Dan metropolitan area in the south northwards to Mount Carmel. Although the capital of a densely populated region, Netanya itself is relatively separate from settlements to the north, south, and east, although, over time, growth has incorporated some into what makes up modern-day Netanya.

Apart from some small moshavim and kibbutzim, south of Netanya is relatively clear of settlement until Herzliya and the start of the Gush Dan metropolitan area. Likewise, to the north is clear of large settlement until Hadera, and to the east until Tulkarm in the West Bank. The area to the east of Netanya does, however, have a large concentration of kibbutzim and moshavim in the Hefer Valley Regional Council and local councils of Kfar Yona, Kadima-Tzoran and Even Yehuda.

Netanya itself is divided into a large number of neighborhoods (see Neighborhoods of Netanya), recently growing southwards out of the city to create several high-end coastal neighborhoods with industrial areas inland. Netanya is home to the Poleg nature reserve and the Irises Dora Rainpool nature park containing the world's largest population of iris atropurpurea. At the center of the park is a rainpool which fills up with water in the winter months, and dries up over the summer months. Signs along the rain pool include information on the types of flora and fauna that populate the ecosystem.

== Demographics ==
Historical population
| Year | Pop. | ±% p.a. |
|---|---|---|
| 1929 | 5 | — |
| 1931 | 100 | +347.21% |
| 1948 | 11,600 | +32.26% |
| 1955 | 31,000 | +15.08% |
| 1961 | 41,300 | +4.90% |
| 1972 | 71,100 | +5.06% |
| 1983 | 102,300 | +3.36% |
| 1995 | 146,100 | +3.01% |
| 2008 | 179,000 | +1.57% |
| 2012 | 192,200 | +1.79% |
| 2015 | 207,946 | +2.66% |
| 2022 | 233,104 | +1.64% |
| 2024 | 234,812 | +0.37% |

In 2024, Netanya was home to 234,813 people. According to the Israel Central Bureau of Statistics (CBS), at the end of 2022, 88.3% of residents were Jewish and 11.7% were classified as "others", and about 31% of the population had immigrated to Israel since 1990. That year the population grew by 4.0%, and the population density was 7,526 people per square kilometer. About 19% of residents were aged 65 or older, and life expectancy at birth (2018–2022) was 83.1 years. The city is ranked 6 out of 10 on the CBS socio-economic index. The population is expected to be around 320,000 in 2035.

In 2008, by origin, 63,800 residents originated from Europe and America, 30,200 from North Africa, 18,100 from Asia, 10,500 from Ethiopia and 38,100 from Israel. That same year, 90,200 of the residents of Netanya were born in Israel, while 71,300 were born abroad. According to the 2022 census, among Netanya's Jewish and other non-Arab population, 38.9% were of European origin (including the former Soviet Union), 31.1% were born in Israel to Israeli-born fathers, 19.6% were of African origin (including North African countries), 7.7% were of Asian origin (including Yemen), and 2.6% were of American or Oceanian origin. These classifications are based on the country of birth of foreign-born residents or their father's country of birth for those born in Israel.

Netanya is home to Jewish communities of diverse backgrounds, including those of French, Libyan and Yemenite origin. Yemenite Jews were among the city's earliest settlers, arriving in 1929 and establishing the Ben Zion neighborhood in 1934. The city also has an established Libyan Jewish community and has attracted substantial immigration from France in recent decades. Netanya has the largest community of Ethiopian Jews in Israel, numbering over 12,000 in 2023. Netanya is also the center of the Persian Jewish community of Israel.

According to a 2025 study by political scientist Yoav Peled, Mizrahi Jews, including Sephardi Jews of Middle Eastern and North African origin, accounted for approximately 46% of Netanya's population in 2022.

According to municipal statistics published in 2023, the city had 83,516 immigrants who had arrived since 1990, including 21,891 from Russia, 17,889 from Ukraine, 15,622 from France, 11,110 from the United States and 4,824 from Ethiopia.

About half of Netanya's Jewish residents are secular. It is also the home of the Sanzer dynasty and has a large Chabad Lubavitch presence.

According to the 2022 census, approximately 88% of Netanya's population was Jewish, 10.8% belonged to other religious categories or were not classified by religion, 0.5% were Christian (approximately 1,165 people), and 0.3% were Muslim (approximately 699 people). The same census found that 43.7% of the city's Jewish population identified as Hiloni (secular), 30.7% as Masorti (traditional), 17.4% as Dati (religious), and 4.8% as Haredi (ultra-Orthodox).

== Neighborhoods ==
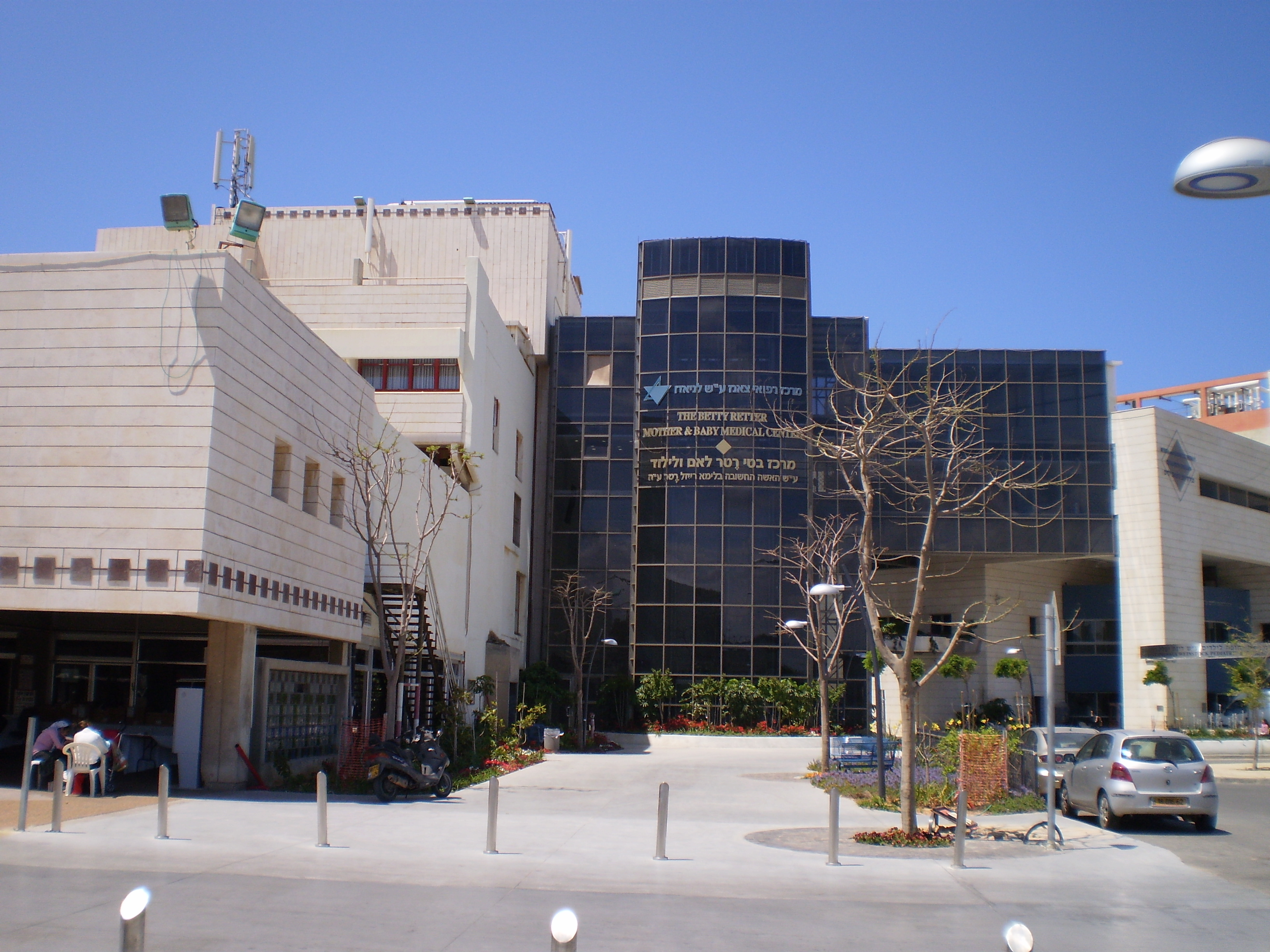
Laniado Hospital

=== Kiryat Eliezer ===
Kiryat Eliezer (Hebrew: קריית אליעזר) is an industrial neighborhood named after Eliezer Kaplan in eastern Netanya. It is also known as Kiryat Eliezer Kaplan Industrial Zone and the Old Industrial Zone. It was established in 1950 when units built for packing produce were set up to support the surrounding orchards. Later, large factories and workshops were established to provide jobs for the city's residents and new immigrants. The Ort Leibowitz Vocational School was established in Kiryat Eliezer. In the 1960s, students from African countries studied there, as part of Israel's cooperation with developing countries.

=== Kiryat Sanz ===
In 1956, a beachfront in northern Netanya was selected as a home base for the Sanzer Hasidim by its leader, Rabbi Yekusiel Yehudah Halberstam. Halberstam established kindergartens, boys' and girls' schools, yeshivas, seminaries, synagogues, a children's home for orphaned and needy girls, an old-age home, and a hospital. In addition to religious services, Kiryat Sanz had a diamond polishing factory built by a New York diamond merchant. Halberstam established his court here in 1960. Following his death in 1994, his eldest son, Rabbi Zvi Elimelech Halberstam, known as the Sanzer Rebbe, became the spiritual leader of the Sanz community in Israel. In 2010, Kiryat Sanz had a population of approximately 1000 families. Most of the older generation are Holocaust survivors. Besides its educational facilities for boys and girls from elementary to post-graduate, there are five synagogues, a mikveh, a printing house, a religious hotel, a religious nursing school, and the Laniado Hospital, which encompasses two medical centers, a children's hospital, a geriatric center and a nursing school, serving a regional population of over 450,000.

=== Neot Herzl ===
Located in the center of Netanya, near the Netanya interchange. It is a unification of four neighborhoods: Shikkun Sela, Gan Beracha, Amidar and Ramat Herzl. The neighborhood, like the main street of the city that runs nearby, was named after Theodor Herzl. The old settlement of Umm Khalid is also located in this neighborhood.

=== Tobruk ===
Lies west of the Ramat Hen neighborhood. The neighborhood was established during the Second World War and is named after the port city of Tobruk in Libya. It used to be a center of Diamond cutting. In 1947, two British Army Sergeants were hanged in the inactive "Feldman" diamond polishing plant in this neighborhood.

=== Nof Hatayelet ===
A comparably new neighborhood, established in 2000, along the cliff promenade, south of the "Carmel" hotel. A paragliding site is located near the neighborhood.

=== Ein Hatkhelet ===
A neighborhood of about 2,500 residents located in the north of Netanya, on the shores of the Mediterranean Sea near Avihayil. Ein Hatkhelet was established as a working-class neighborhood in Emek Hefer in 1936. In 1948 it became part of the city of Netanya.

=== Ramat Ephraim ===
Named after Ephraim Aaronsohn. Part of it is the Moshav Ramat Tiomkin which was established in 1932 and over time was incorporated into Netanya. The moshav was founded by the people of Betar, and a Kvutza named Menorah. It was named after Ze'ev Vladimir Tiomkin.

=== Ramat Chen ===
One of the southern neighborhoods of the city, near Gesher HaAchdut. Previously called Pagi neighborhood, since it was founded by Poalei Agudat Yisrael (Pagi is the Hebrew acronym of it).

=== Neot Ganim ===
Previously called "Shikkun Vatikim", this neighborhood is one of the first neighborhoods in the city and it was established in the location of the city's immigrant camp used to be. At its southern end is the cemetery of the city of Netanya.

=== Neve Itamar ===
The neighborhood was established in 1944 as an independent settlement and was annexed to Netanya in 1949. It is named after Itamar Ben-Avi, who has been an important figure in the story of the establishment of Netanya.

=== Ramat Poleg ===
Ramat Poleg was built in the late 1970s. It is the southernmost neighborhood in Netanya.

=== Ir Yamim ===
Established in 2006. This neighborhood is located along the shoreline at the southern part of Netanya. The neighborhood borders Ramat Poleg (to its south) and the Irus nature reserve (to its north).

=== Agamim ===
Established in 2013, and still in construction. It is located next to the Vernal pool of Netanya. The neighborhood is divided into three sections, A B & C. Section C is currently in construction (as of October 2023).

== Economy ==
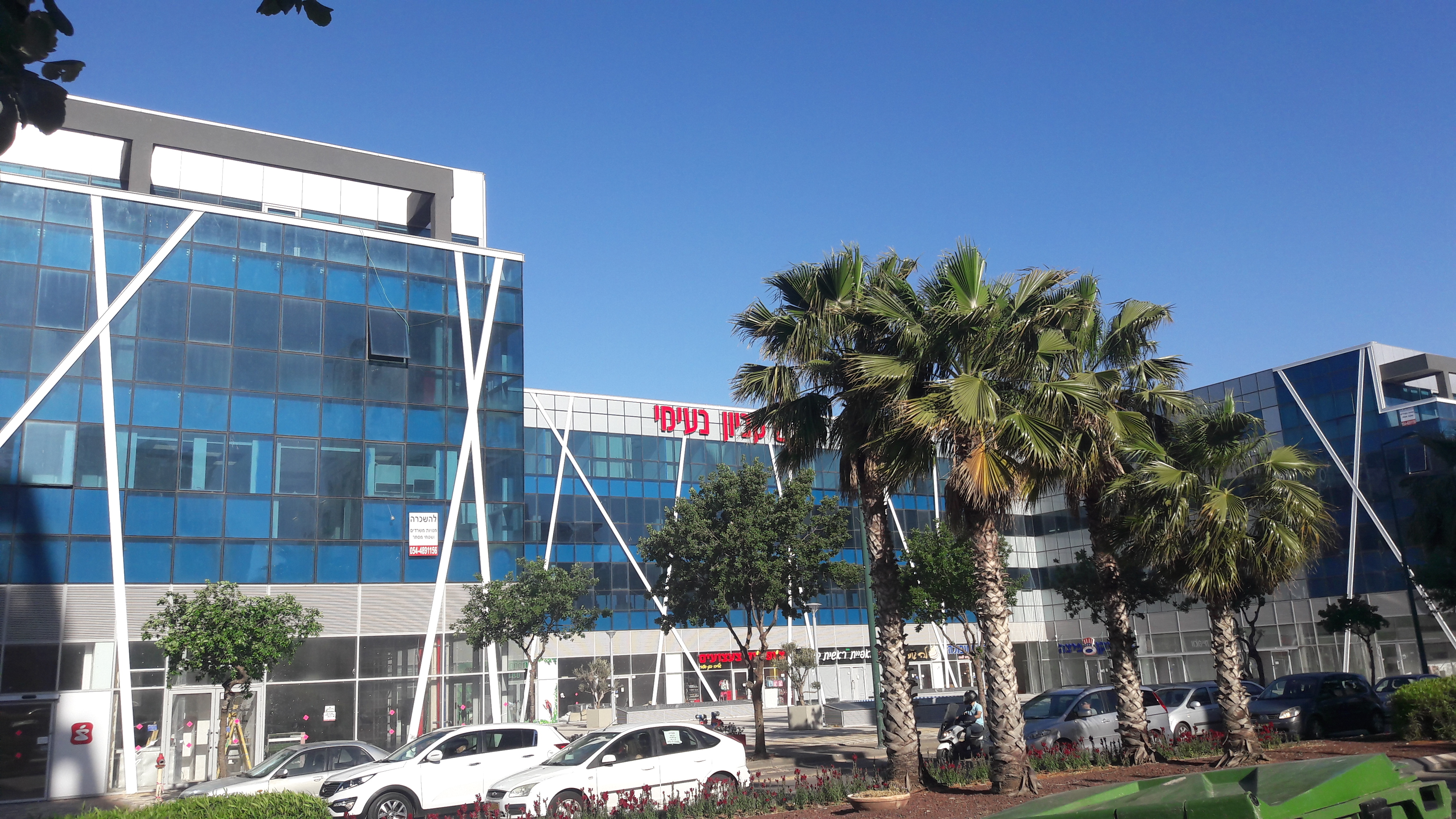
Naimi Shopping Mall

In its early years, Netanya's economy was based on citrus groves. In the 1940s, as the diamond industry moved from Nazi-occupied Belgium to Mandatory Palestine, Netanya became the country's center of diamond polishing. The center of the industry later shifted to the Tel Aviv area, and most of the city's workshops closed.

Industry is concentrated in two industrial zones: the older Kiryat Eliezer zone in the east of the city and the Pinchas Sapir (Poleg) zone in the south. Sectors represented include high-tech, steel, pharmaceuticals, food, textiles, rubber, furniture and electronics. One of Israel's largest breweries is located just south of the city. In April 2001, Israel's first IKEA store, covering 23,000 square metres (250,000 sq ft), opened in Netanya. The store was destroyed by fire in February 2011; the rebuilt store was scheduled to reopen in March 2012.

Tourism also plays a major part in the economy, and Netanya is one of Israel's leading seaside resorts. Several hotels opened or were renovated in the late 2010s, including the Tamares West Lagoon, which opened in 2017 and, with more than 270 rooms, became the city's largest hotel.

== Transportation ==
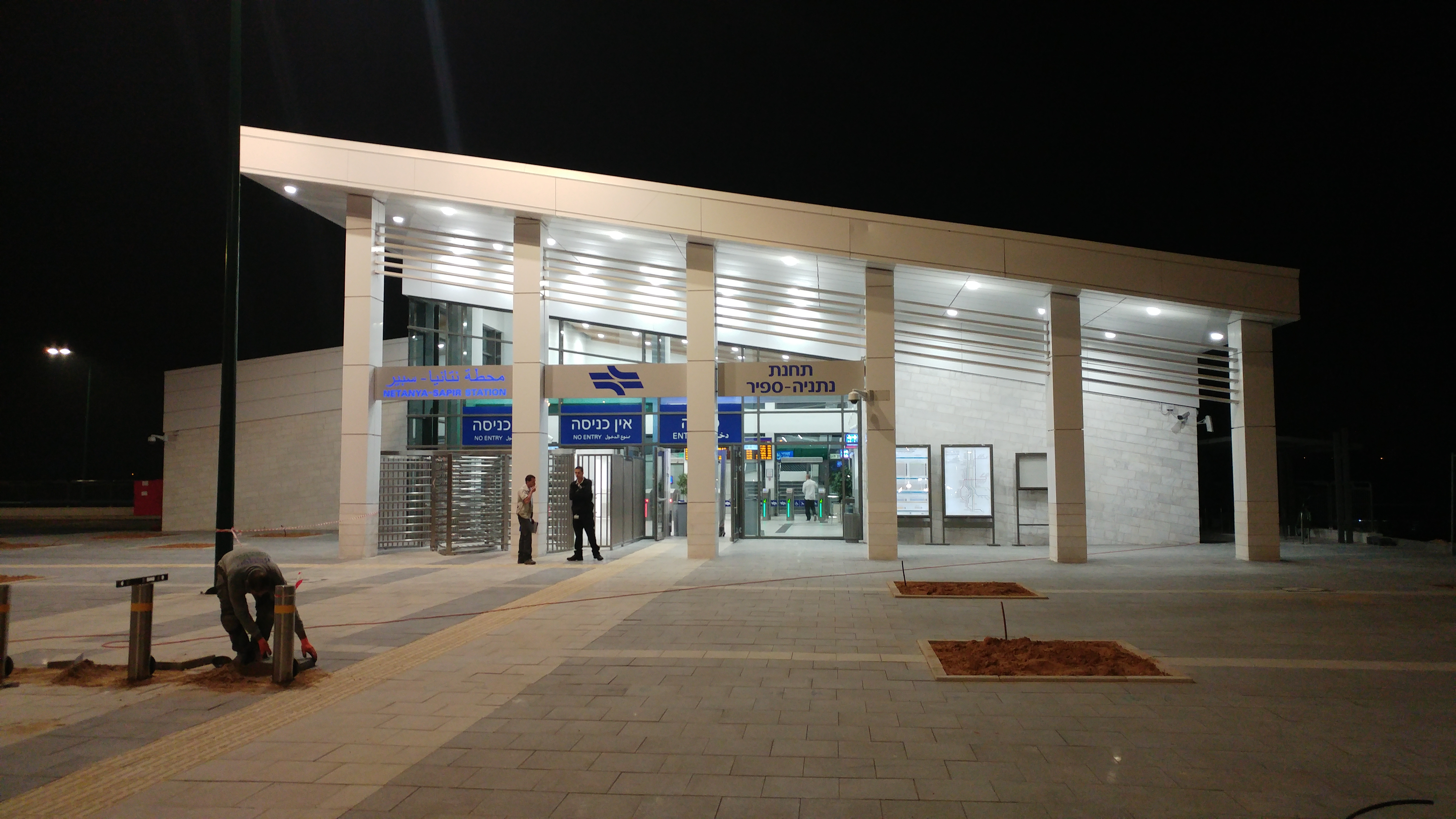
Netanya Sapir Railway Station

The public transportation in Netanya is based on buses, railways and service taxis.

=== Train ===
The Netanya railway station is located near the city center, on the east side of Highway 2. Netanya Sapir railway station is located in the Poleg Industrial Area. Beit Yehoshua railway station, located in the moshav of Beit Yehoshua, immediately south of Netanya, is convenient for getting to southern Netanya and to the Poleg Industrial Area. These stations are connected to the city by Egged bus service, although Shay Li service taxis are highly predominant at the Beit Yehoshua station. There are direct trains from Netanya and Beit Yehoshua to Tel Aviv, Binyamina, Hadera, Herzliya, Lod, Rehovot, Ashdod, Ashkelon and other towns. All Israel Railways stations, including Ben Gurion Airport, can be accessed from Netanya by means of transfer stations such as Binyamina and Tel Aviv.

=== Bus ===
Egged buses run from the Netanya central bus station to Jerusalem, Haifa, Eilat and other destinations. Many neighborhoods have a direct connection to Tel Aviv without the need to pass through the central bus station. In addition, many Egged lines connecting Tel Aviv with the north of the country stop at the Netanya Interchange on Highway 2, giving Netanya a direct connection with Nazareth, Tiberias, Kiryat Shmona and many other northern destinations. Metropoline operates bus services to Tel Aviv, Bnei Brak and the surrounding communities, including the city of Hadera. Some regional lines are still operated by Egged. The intracity transportation is based on Egged Ta'avura bus lines and Shay Li service taxis.

== Culture ==
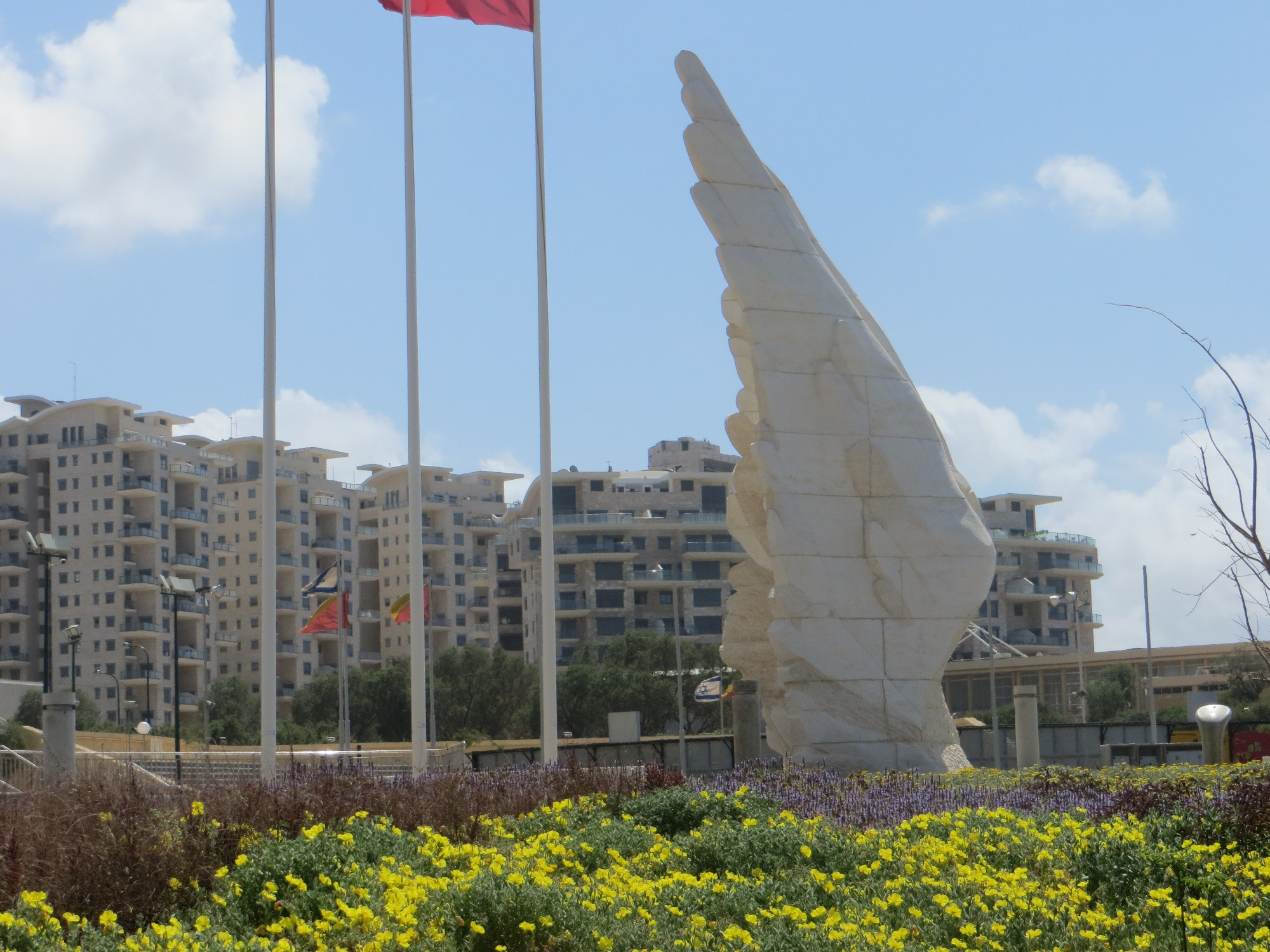
Victory Monument in Netanya, dedicated to the victory of the Soviet Union in WW2

The Well House is a museum documenting the early history of Netanya. It is located in a historic building dating from 1928. Other museums are the Tribes of Israel Pearl Museum of Yemenite Jewish Heritage, the Shlomo Dror Art Institute, and the Diamimon Diamond Museum. The Cliff Gallery, Gosher Gallery, Abecassis Gallery and Fourth Gallery are all located in the city.

War memorials include the Holocaust Train Car, Beit Yad Lebanim, a memorial to fallen IDF soldiers from Netanya, the National Memorial for Fallen Ordnance Corps, the Alexandroni Brigade Memorial, the National Victory Monument, dedicated to the Soviet Red Army victory over Nazi Germany, and the Memorial to Victims of Acts of Terror.

In June 2016, a street in Netanya was named for Japanese diplomat Chiune Sugihara, who was responsible for saving Lithuanian Jews from Nazi persecution early in World War II by providing visas allowing travel eastwards, beyond the reach of the Third Reich's genocidal grasp.

== Education ==
According to the Netanya Municipality, the city has 36,544 students including 5,351 pupils in 186 kindergartens, 16,748 in 46 elementary schools, and 14,445 in 16 high schools. Education in the city is controlled by the municipality's Education Administration. 52.7% of 12th grade students were entitled to a matriculation certificate (Bagrut) in 2001.

Netanya Academic College offers Bachelor's and master's degrees, and a unique program for high-school students. Other institutions of higher education in the city are Ort Hermelin College of Engineering, Zinman College of Physical Education and Sport Sciences, Lesley College, and Tesler School for Nursing. The Wingate Institute, Israel's National Centre for Physical Education and Sport, is located just south of the city.

== Sports ==
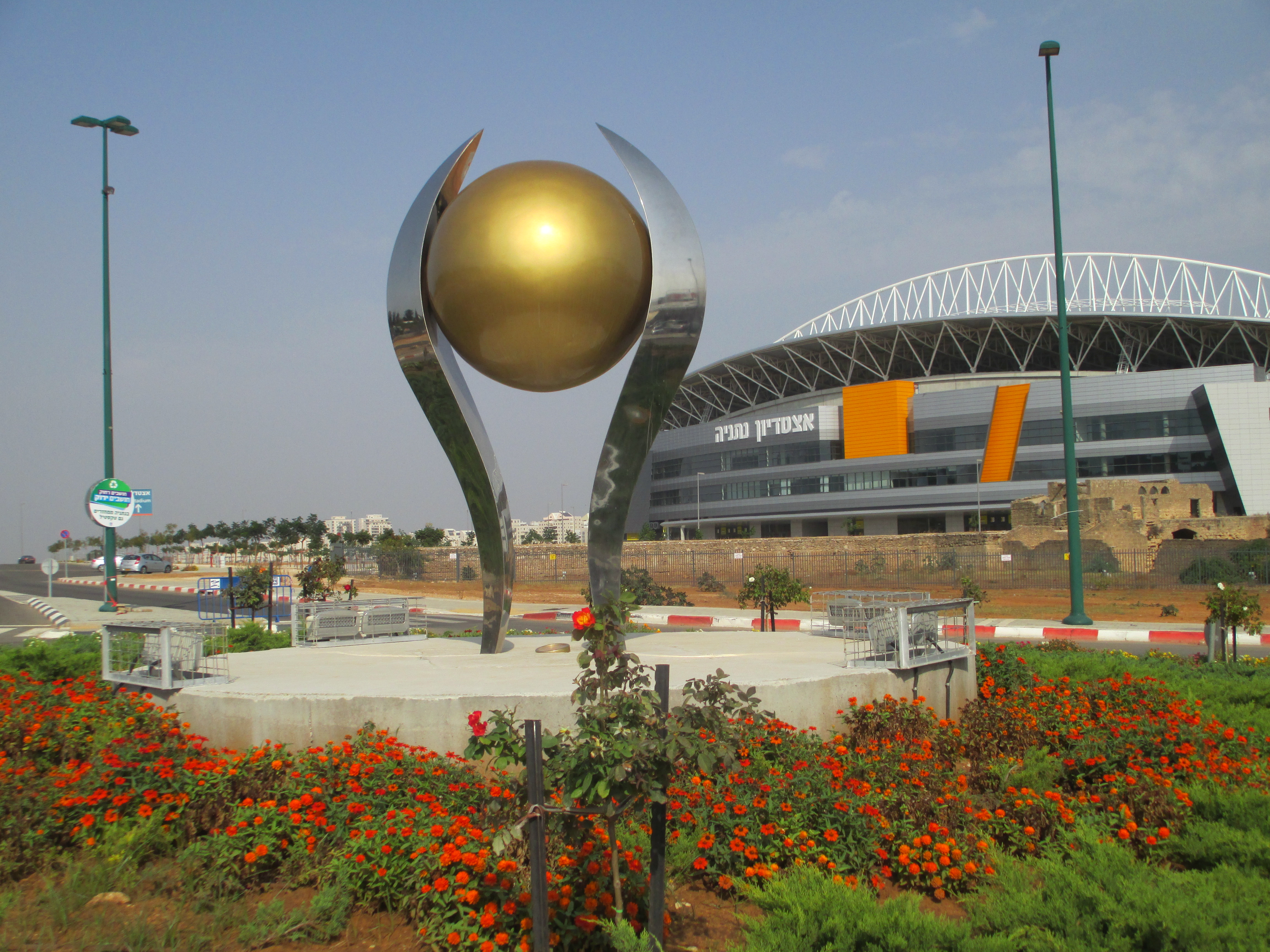
Netanya Stadium and the Golden Ball sculpture

The city's main stadium is the 13,610-seat Netanya Stadium, which opened in November 2012, replacing the older Sar-Tov Stadium, which was sold to help fund the roughly $60 million project. Netanya has three football teams, the main being Maccabi Netanya, whose main local rival is Beitar Nes Tubruk. The third is Maccabi HaSharon Netanya, though the team has been limited to fourth-tier football in the Liga Bet. Elitzur Netanya represents the city in the first tier of Israeli basketball. In handball, the city is represented by Hapoel Netanya in the 2nd tier of the Israeli handball. In baseball, the city was represented by the Netanya Tigers of the Israel Baseball League. As part of the "Netanya – city of sport" program the beach soccer stadium was established and it currently hosts Israeli championship and international "Diamond tournament" games.

Aside from the professional sports teams, Maccabi Netanya also has a boxing and fencing club while Hapoel Netanya has judo and gymnastic clubs, and Elitzur Netanya has a lacrosse club.

The founder of Krav Maga, Imi Lichtenfeld opened a sports academy in Netanya for the continuation of his way and his martial art.

Netanya is a center of paragliding in Israel; the coastal cliffs and offshore breeze allow gliders to fly along the cliff line above the beach.

Netanya hosted the 2015 European Short Course Swimming Championships in December 2015 at the new swimming complex of the Wingate Institute. The complex features an Olympic-size pool with 10 lanes and 3m depth, backed by the latest built-in filtration systems, an 8-lane 50m pool and a 6-lane 25m pool.

Netanya hosted the World Lacrosse Championship tournament on 12–21 July 2018, making Israel the first country where English is not the primary language to host the event. Forty-six nations from around the world sent teams.

The city hosted the 2021 FINA Junior Water Polo World Championships.

== Urban development ==
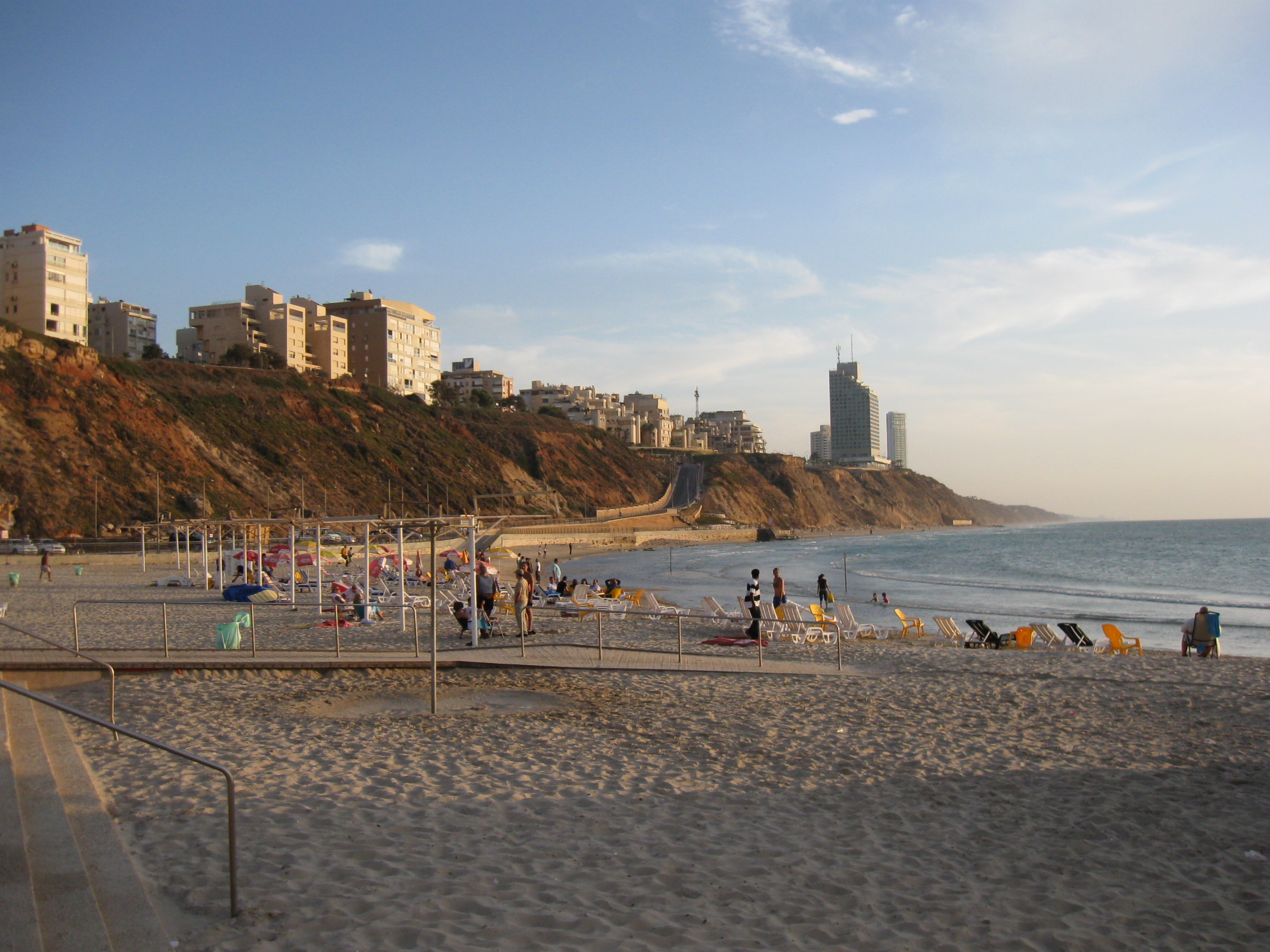
Beach promenade of Netanya

Several of the tallest buildings in Israel are located in Netanya. The construction of eight new skyscrapers, six of them over 30 stories, was approved in 2011. Dozens of 40–42-story skyscrapers have been planned, many of them along the shore.

Netanya is developing according to master plans for 2035 which seek to massively increase residential units and office space in the city, as well as a new marina and piers. As part of the plan, the intention of the municipality is for the city's population to reach 320,000 by 2035.

The city seeks to become a major tourist hub for local and overseas tourism, with an "Israeli Riviera" on the shore. Among the projects planned in 2013 was the construction of 2,062 housing units and 1,100 hotel rooms while leaving much of the land as open space. The city has set itself a goal to expand open space from 56 to 70 percent. The plan is expected to attract more residents, boost hotel development, and increase the number of gardens and green spaces. It has been suggested that as the city's population expands, a light rail system may be built there in the future.

== Voting patterns ==
In the 2022 election, 62 percent of voters in Netanya voted for the parties of the right-wing coalition led by Benjamin Netanyahu, while 35 percent voted for the parties of the center-left coalition led by Yair Lapid and 0.1 percent voted for the Arab parties.

In the 2026 election, 57 percent of voters in Netanya voted for the parties of the right-wing coalition led by Benjamin Netanyahu, while 36 percent voted for the parties of the center-left coalition led by Gadi Eisenkot and 0.1 percent voted for the Arab parties. An additional 3.7 percent voted for the Reservists, and 1.9 percent voted for Amcha Yisrael. Voter turnout increased 15 percent from the 2022 election.

== Twin towns – sister cities ==
Netanya is twinned with:

- (Georgia (country)) Batumi, Georgia
- Bournemouth, United Kingdom
- Como, Italy
- Dortmund, Germany
- Gelendzhik, Russia
- Giessen, Germany
- Gold Coast, Australia
- Nice, France
- Nowy Sącz, Poland
- Poděbrady, Czech Republic
- Sarcelles, France
- Siófok, Hungary
- Stavanger, Norway
- Sunny Isles Beach, United States
- Xiamen, China

== Notable people ==
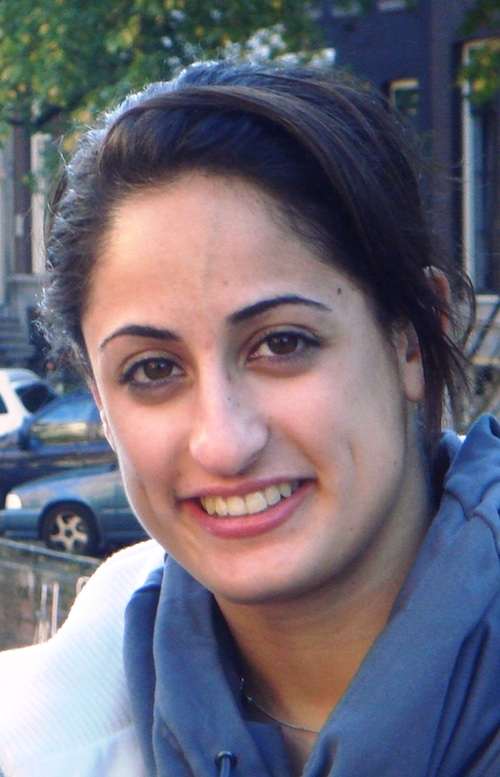
Yarden Gerbi

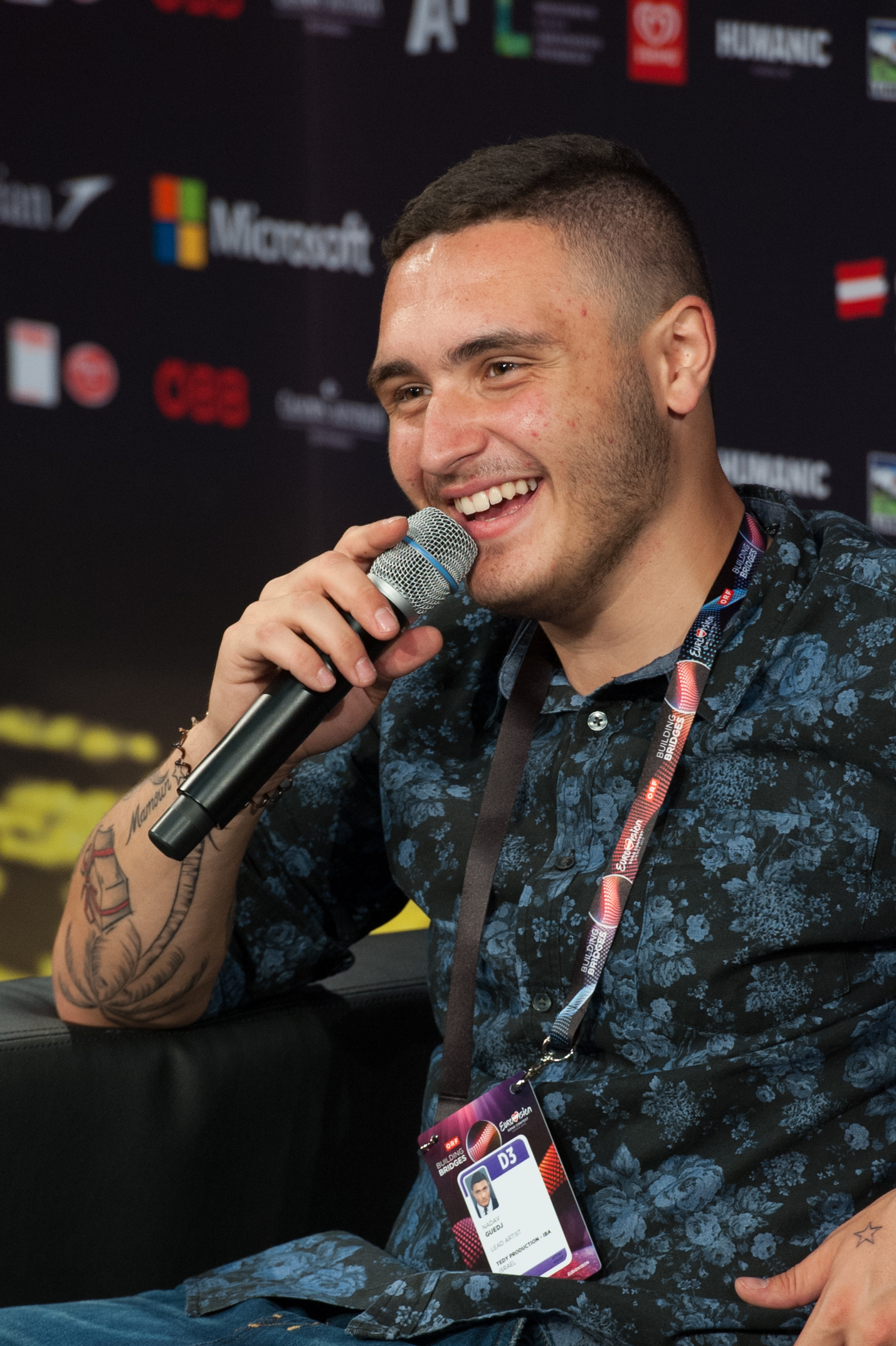
Nadav Guedj

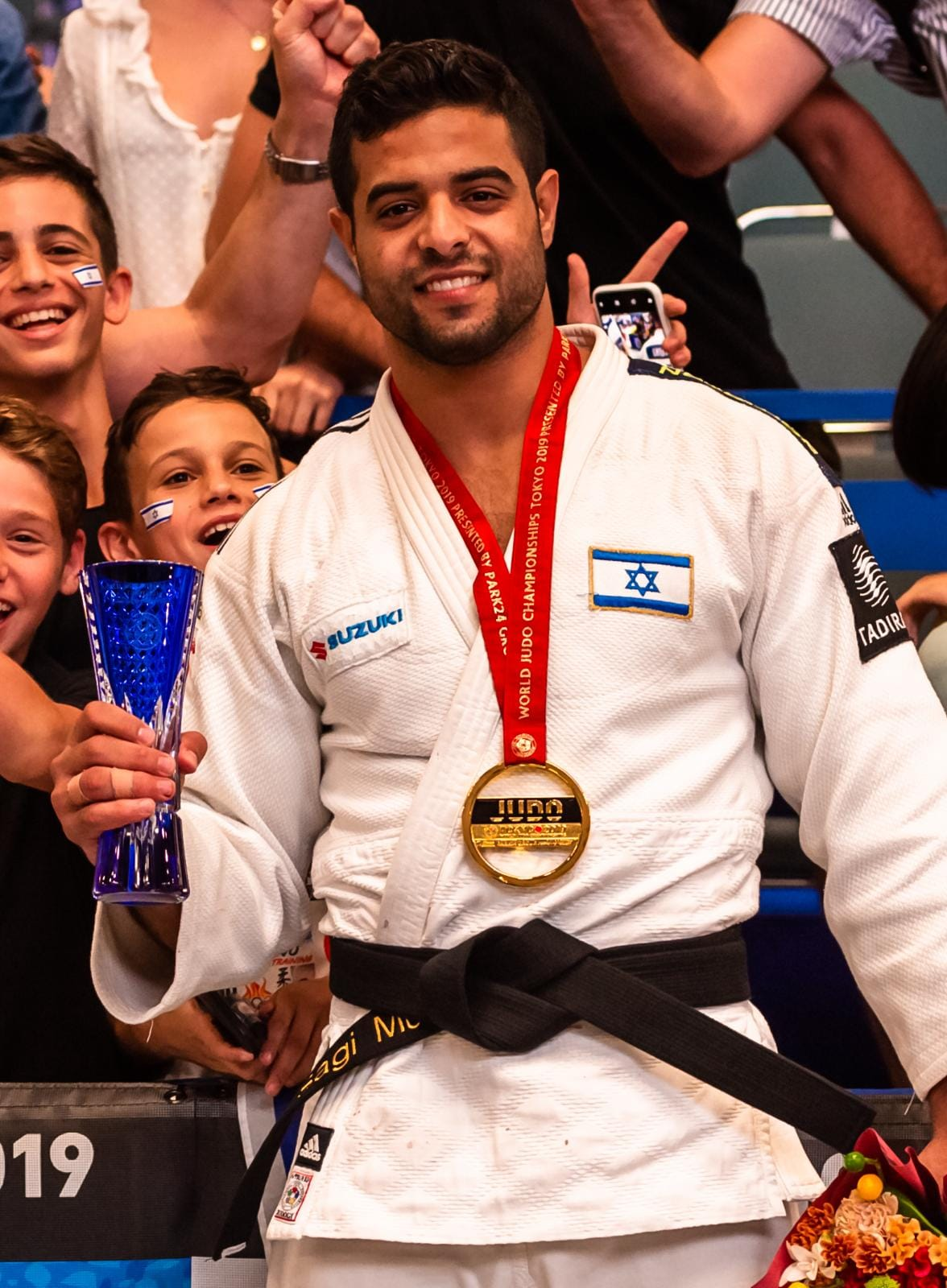
Sagi Muki

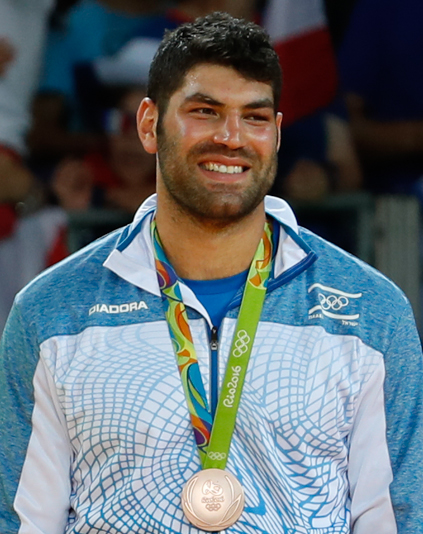
Or Sasson

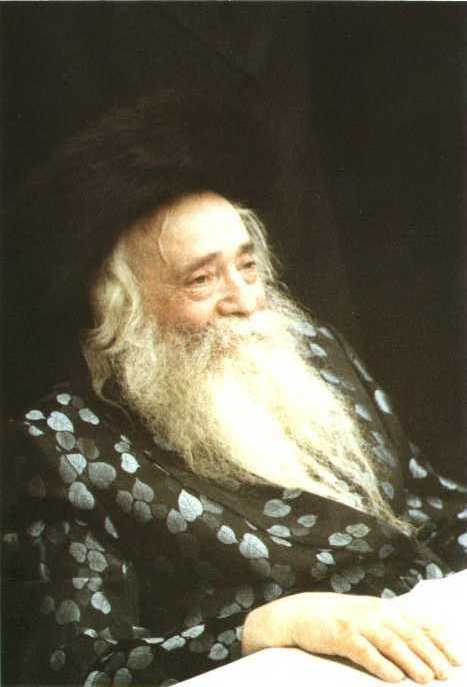
Yekusiel Yehudah Halberstam

- Linor Abargil (born 1980), attorney, actress and model, winner of the Miss World 1998
- Eduard Akuvaev (1945–2015), Russian-Israeli artist and teacher
- Avi Alfasi (born 1980), former football player
- Tova Ascher, Israeli film editor, director, and screenwriter
- Yityish Titi Aynaw (born 1991), model and television personality, winner of the Miss Israel 2013
- Orit Bar-On (born 1975), Olympic judoka
- Yehuda Barkan (1945–2020), actor and filmmaker
- Edith Hahn Beer (1914–2009), Austrian Jewish woman who survived the Holocaust by hiding her Jewish identity and marrying a Nazi officer
- Cheryl Bentov (born 1960), American real estate agent and former Israeli Mossad agent
- Tamir Blatt (born 1997), basketball player in the Israel Basketball Premier League
- Maya Bouskilla (born 1977), singer and songwriter
- Noah Brosch (born 1948), astronomer, astrophysicist and space researcher
- Yonatan "Yoni" Chetboun (born 1979), member of the Knesset
- Eli Dasa (born 1992), footballer for Dynamo Moscow and the Israel national team
- Artem Dolgopyat (born 1997), Olympic champion and world champion gymnast
- Jacko Eisenberg (born 1980), singer
- Eva Fabian (born 1993), American-Israeli world champion swimmer
- Ilay Feingold (born 2004), footballer for the Major League Soccer club New England Revolution
- Eli Finish (born 1975), actor and comedian
- Yarden Gerbi (born 1989), world champion and Olympic bronze medalist judoka
- Haim Gidon (born 1944), martial artist
- Moshe Glam (born 1968), football player
- Ageze Guadie (born 1989), Olympic marathon runner
- Nadav Guedj (born 1998), singer and actor, Israeli Eurovision Song Contest 2015 entrant
- Nikita Haikin (born 1995), professional football player
- Yekusiel Yehudah Halberstam (1905–1994), Klausenburger Rebbe
- Zvi Elimelech Halberstam (born 1952), Sanzer Rebbe
- Yitzhak "Haki" Harel (born 1957), civil servant and army general
- Raz Hershko (born 1998), Olympic silver medalist and European champion judoka
- Mariano Idelman (born 1974), actor and comedian
- Silvi Jan (born 1973), female professional and Israeli team footballer
- Deniz Khazaniuk (born 1994), tennis player
- Baruch Kimmerling (1939–2007), scholar and professor of sociology
- Moti Kirschenbaum (1939–2015), television presenter and filmmaker
- Elad Koren (born 1968), former professional footballer
- Aliza Lavie (born 1964), academic and politician
- David Levin (born 1999), ice hockey player
- Ronny Levy (born 1966), football player and now a manager
- Imi Lichtenfeld (1910–1998), martial artist, founded Krav Maga
- Nili Lotan, Israeli-American fashion designer
- Oded Machnes (born 1956), football player
- Yossi Malka (born 1974), football player
- Baruch Mizrachi (1926–1948) Arab-Jewish militant (1926–1948)
- Tesama Moogas (born 1988), Olympic marathon runner
- Sagi Muki (born 1992), Olympian and world champion judoka
- Andrea Murez (born 1992), Israeli–American Olympic swimmer for Israel
- Amos Neheysi (born 1979), former football player
- Gabi Packer (born 1969), former football player
- Romi Paritzki (born 2004), world champion rhythmic gymnast
- Or Sasson (born 1990), Olympic bronze medalist judoka
- Stav Shaffir (born 1985), activist, journalist, and politician
- Arik Shivek (born 1956), professional basketball coach
- Mordechai Spiegler (born 1944), football player
- Shiraz Tal (born 1974), model
- Shalom Tikva (born 1965), football player
- Margalit Tzan'ani (born 1948), singer and television personality
- Meir Wieseltier (born 1941), poet, translator and journalist
- Ehud Yatom (born 1948), Shin Bet agent and Knesset member
- Ron Yosef (born 1974), openly gay Orthodox Jewish rabbi

== Gallery ==
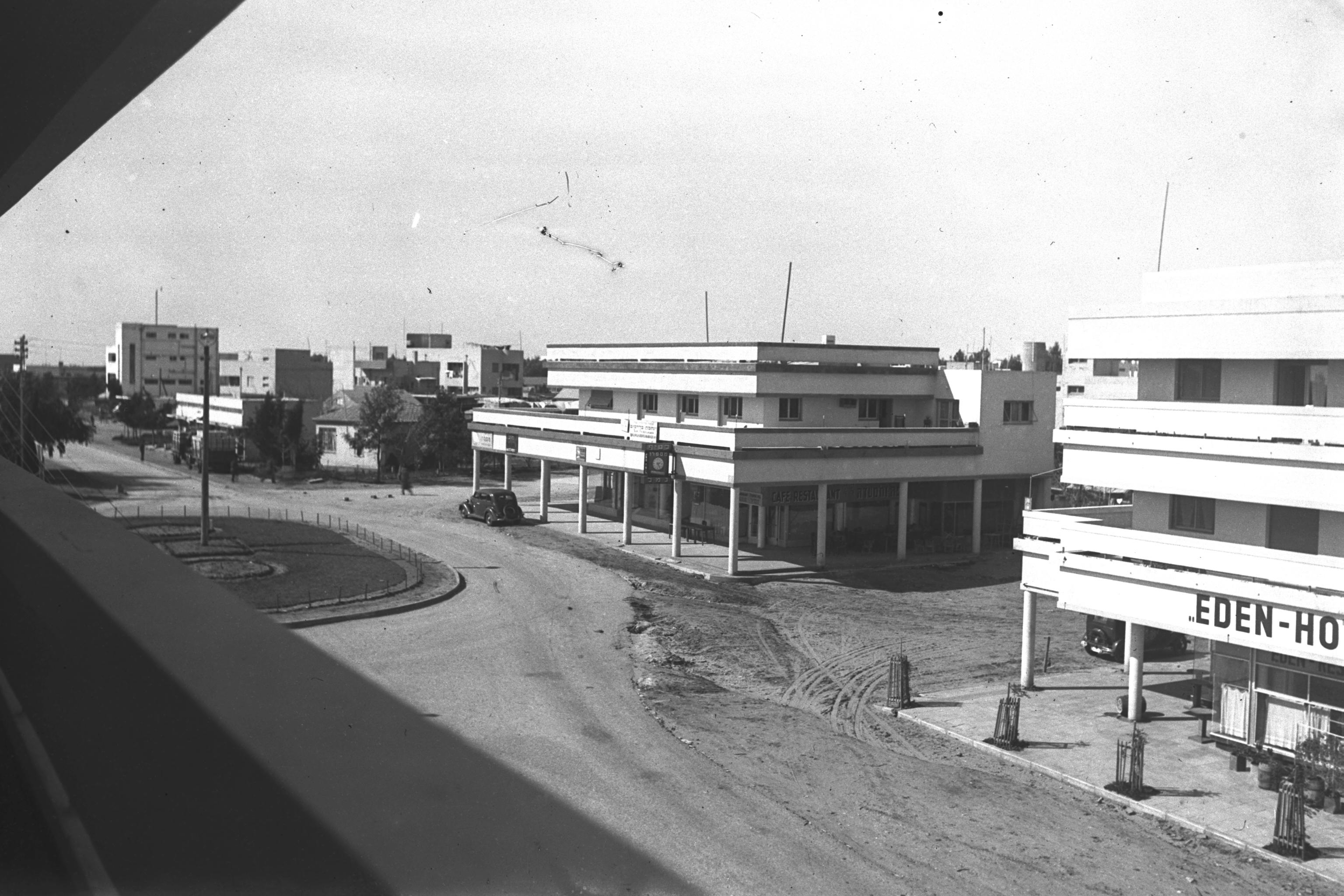
Zion Square, Netanya, 1939

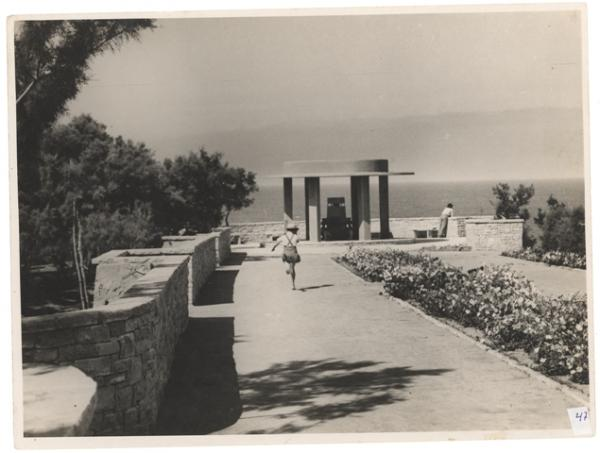
Gan Hamelech, 1940

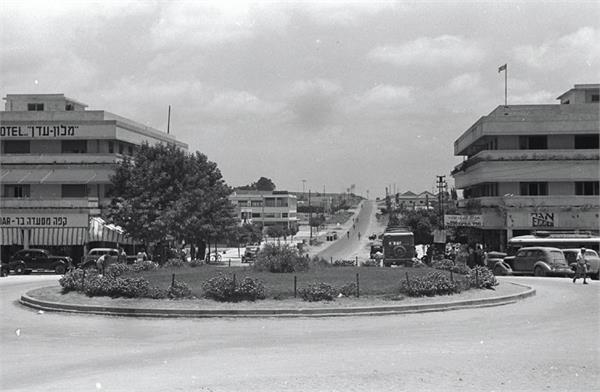
Netanya 1947

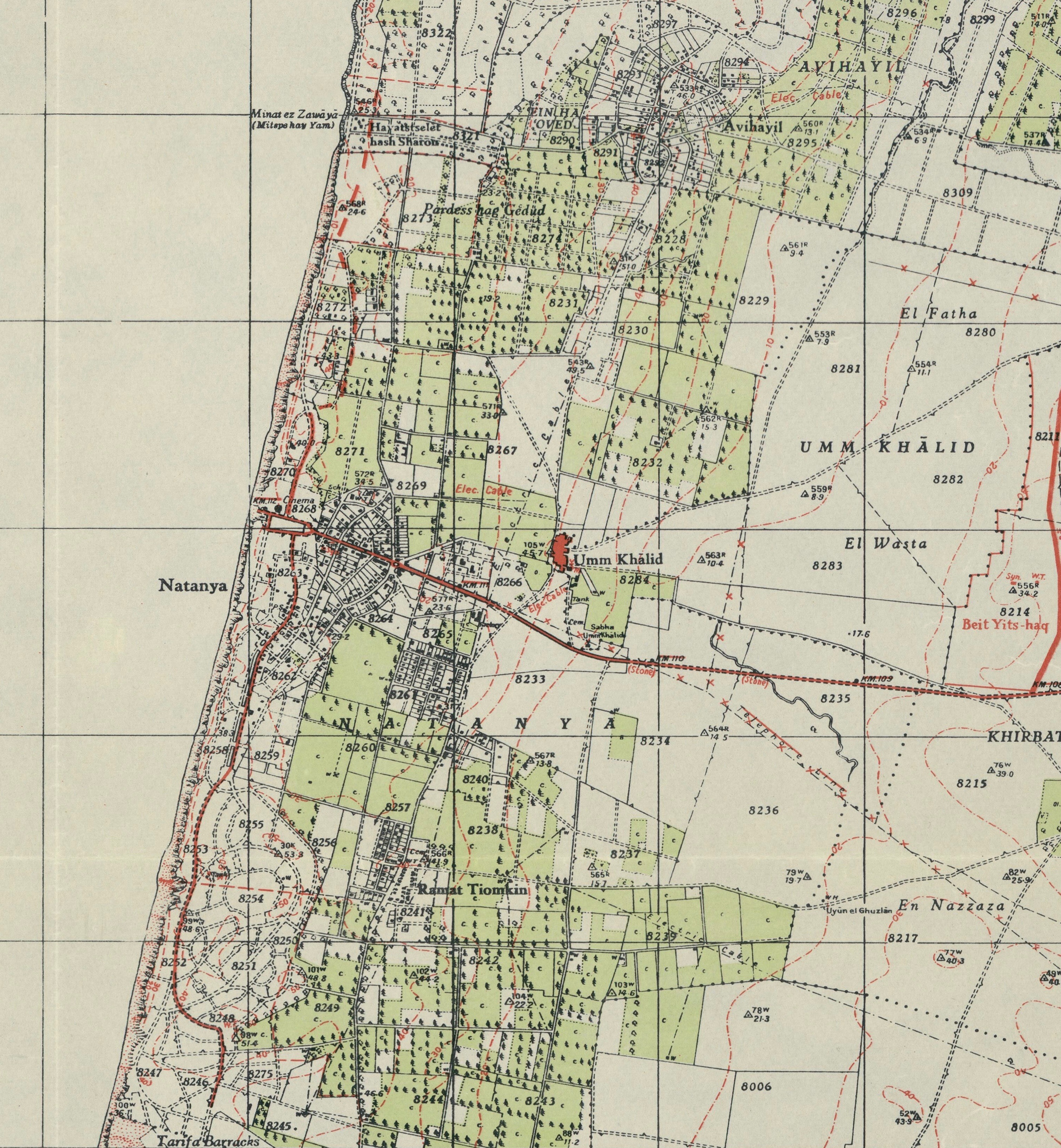
Natanya 1939 1:20,000

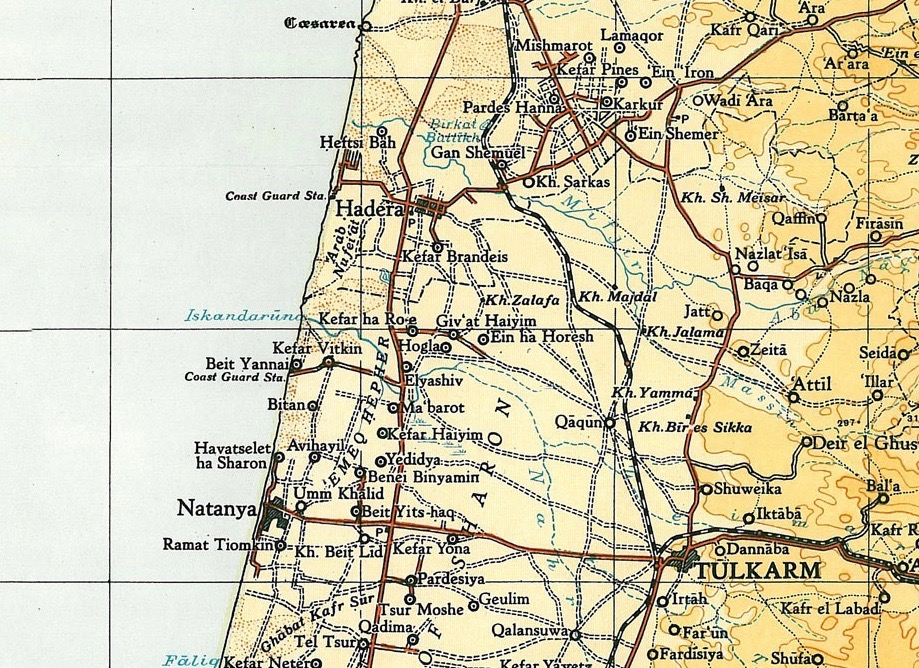
Natanya 1945 1:250,000

== See also ==
- List of Netanya neighborhoods
